= The Southern Daily Argus (Goulburn, 1881) =

19th-century Australian newspaper

Front page, The Southern Argus, 11 June 1881

The Southern Daily Argus was an English language newspaper published in Goulburn, New South Wales, Australia.

== History ==
The Southern Daily Argus ran from 11 June 1881 until 13 October 1885. The paper was published daily and for sold for a penny.

== Digitisation ==
The Southern Daily Argus has been digitised as part of the Australian Newspapers Digitisation Program by the National Library of Australia.

== See also ==
- List of newspapers in New South Wales
