= Party Builder =

Party Builder, also published as Party, was a monthly English language newspaper published in Sydney, by the Communist Party of Australia from June 1942.

Front page of Party Builder, No. 2, July 1942

== Newspaper history ==
The first issue, printed on 1 June 1942, was titled Party. Subsequent issues were published as Party Builder up until 1 July 1965. It was published as an internal newspaper for the Central Committee of the Communist Party of Australia.

== Digitisation ==
The paper has been partially digitised as part of the Australian Newspapers Digitisation Program of the National Library of Australia.

== See also ==
- List of newspapers in Australia
- List of newspapers in New South Wales
