= The Temora Telegraph and Mining Advocate =

The Temora Telegraph and Mining Advocate was an English language newspaper published in Temora, New South Wales, Australia.

Front page of The Temora Telegraph and Mining Advocate, 29 July 1880

== History ==
The Temora Telegraph and Mining Advocate consists of only one volume published on 29 July 1880 by Thomas Head in Temora, New South Wales, Australia.

Volume one, number one of the newspaper consists of just one page with an editorial titled "Ourselves". The editorial promised subsequent issues of four pages to be published weekly until 14 August 1880 after which the newspaper would then become a tri-weekly publication.

The editorial of The Temora Telegraph and Mining Advocate also declares the newspaper to be an advocate for the "material and moral development" of the rapidly growing mining districts in and around Temora. It further states the newspapers' intention to agitate for the Government to "undertake some scheme by which a large and permanent Supply of Water may be conserved for the use of the present and future dwellers on this... great goldfield".

== Digitisation ==
The first and only issue of The Temora Telegraph and Mining Advocate has been digitised as part of the Australian Newspapers Digitisation Program project hosted by the National Library of Australia.

== See also ==
- List of newspapers in New South Wales
- List of newspapers in Australia
