= The Chronicle (Katoomba) =

Former Australian newspaper

The Chronicle began publication on Thursday 15 August 1929, it circulated in Katoomba, Blackheath and Leura for only nine issues.

== History ==
The Chronicle was published weekly by Joseph Bennett and Edmund Collins (late editor of The Katoomba Daily) at Bennett's office and printery on the corner of Bathurst Road and Cascade Street, Katoomba. Beginning publication on Thursday 15 August 1929, it circulated in Katoomba, Blackheath and Leura for only nine issues. The editors spoke in their closing remarks of a "bitter campaign" waged against them from the start. The Katoomba Daily, it seems, lowered the cost of advertising to levels The Chronicle could not match.

== Digitisation ==
The Chronicle has been digitised as part of the Australian Newspapers Digitisation Program project of the National Library of Australia.

== See also ==
- List of newspapers in New South Wales
- List of newspapers in Australia
