= Camden News =

Defunct Australian newspaper

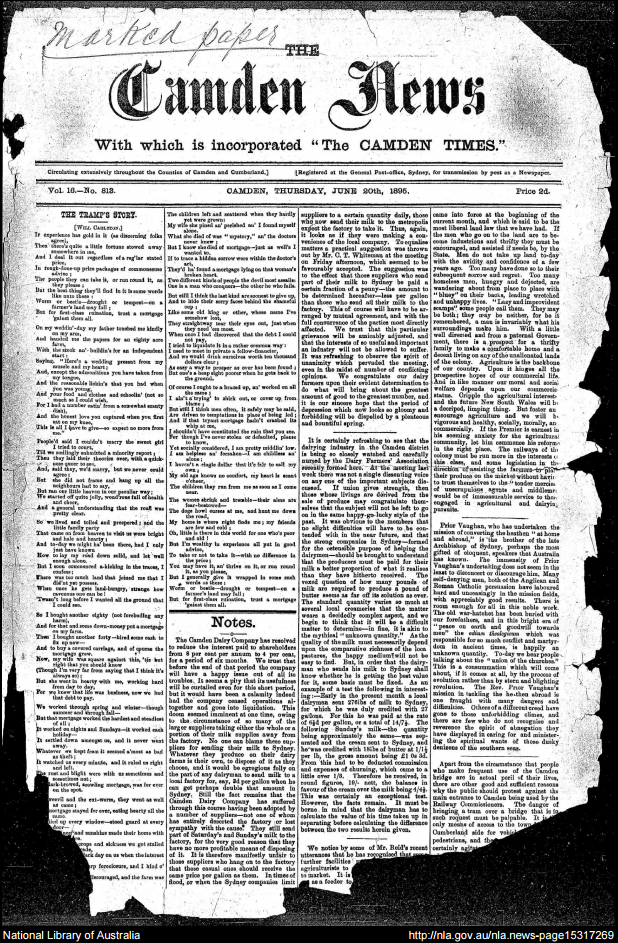
Front page of the Camden News on 20 July 1895.

The Camden News was a weekly newspaper published in Camden, New South Wales, Australia from 1881 to 1982.

== History ==
The Camden News was first published in 1881 by William Sidman and Frank Campbell. The publication of the Camden News ceased with the 2 June 1982 issue.

== Digitisation ==
The paper has been digitised as part of the Australian Newspapers Digitisation Program project of the National Library of Australia.

== See also ==
- List of newspapers in Australia
- List of newspapers in New South Wales
