= The Blackheath Bulletin =

Australian newspaper published 1920s

A paper known as The Blackheath Bulletin was published for a short period in the early 1920s and appears to have ceased publication by the end of 1929.

== History ==
A paper known as The Blackheath Bulletin was published for a short period in the early 1920s (Vol.1, No.1 issued 1 May 1923) under the wing of The Blue Mountain Echo. In 1929 it was resurrected by Blue Mountains Newspapers Ltd. and printed at The Star office in Katoomba. There seems to have been two distinct runs of this paper. The first, under the editorship of Victor Yeoman Mathias, appears to have been free and to have ceased publication by the end of 1929. The second, edited by W. E. Vincent, who had earlier been associated with the Echo's Bulletin, began publication on 13 November 1930. Its thirteenth and final issue appeared on 5 February 1931. The offices of Vincent's Bulletin were in "Oakdene", Govetts Leap Road, Blackheath.

== Digitisation ==
The Blackheath Bulletin has been digitised as part of the Australian Newspapers Digitisation Program project of the National Library of Australia.

== See also ==
- List of newspapers in New South Wales
- List of newspapers in Australia
