= The Bathurst Post =

Former newspaper in New South Wales

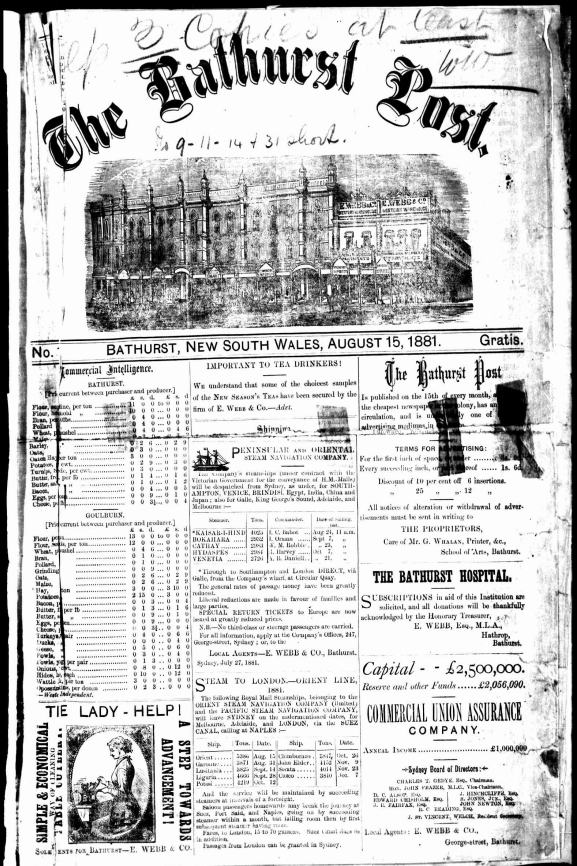
The Bathurst Post, 15 August 1881

The Bathurst Post was a newspaper published in Bathurst, New South Wales, Australia from 1881 until 1922.

== History ==
The Bathurst Post was first published on 15 August 1881 and printed by Glyndwr Whalan. It ceased publication on 15 March 1922, with issue number 486. The publication was distributed free of charge, supported by advertising, and was intended by the proprietors to summarise news and other matters of interest for both a local and potentially wider audience.

== Digitisation ==
The paper has been digitised as part of the Australian Newspapers Digitisation Program project of the National Library of Australia.

== See also ==
- List of newspapers in Australia
- List of newspapers in New South Wales
