= Australian, Windsor, Richmond, and Hawkesbury Advertiser =

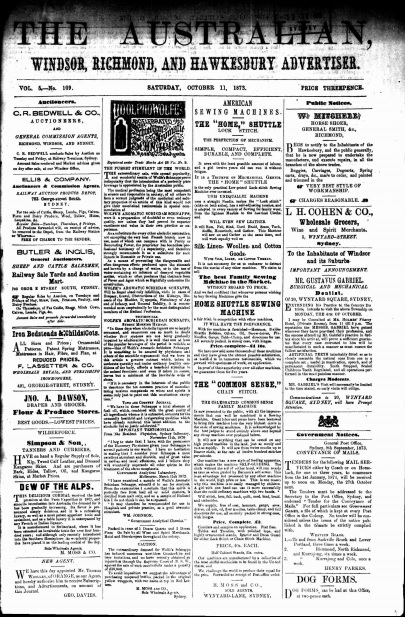
Front page of The Australian, Windsor, Richmond, and Hawkesbury Advertiser, Saturday 11 October 1873

The Australian, Windsor, Richmond, and Hawkesbury Advertiser was an English language newspaper published in Windsor, New South Wales. It commenced publication in 1871, thirty years before the federation of Australia.

== History ==
The newspaper was first published in 1871 before ceasing publication in 1899. The paper was published by printer, George Louis Asher Davies.

== Digitisation ==
The surviving copies of the paper have been digitised as part of the Australian Newspapers Digitisation Program project hosted by the National Library of Australia.

== See also ==
- List of newspapers in Australia
- List of newspapers in New South Wales
