= The Dispatch (Sydney, 1843) =

Front page, The Dispatch, Saturday, 4 November 1843

The Dispatch also known as The Sydney Dispatch was an English language newspaper published in Sydney, New South Wales, Australia.

== Newspaper history ==
No. 1, Vol. 1 of The Dispatch was published on Saturday, 4 November 1843. The paper was printed and published at the Office, Harrington Street, by G. O'Brien. The aim of the paper was to "carefully watch the public interest, to carefully guide the public opinion". The paper ceased publication with Vol. 2, no. 61, 28 December 1844.

== Digitisation ==
The Dispatch has been digitised as part of the Australian Newspapers Digitisation Program by the National Library of Australia.

== See also ==
- List of newspapers in New South Wales
