= The Mountain Daily =

The Mountain Daily was an English language newspaper published in Katoomba, New South Wales, Australia between 1919 and 1920. It was published by Charles Gordon Buchanan.

== History ==
The Mountain Daily was first published in 1919. Microfilm copies of only two issues are held by the Blue Mountains City Library: 26 July 1919 and 7 February 1920. The July 1919 issue was printed and published by Charles Gordon Buchanan at premises in Main Street, Katoomba. Buchanan had previously worked for the Echo. By February 1920 the paper was in the hands of J. M. Bennett.

== Digitisation ==
The Mountain Daily has been digitised as part of the Australian Newspapers Digitisation Program project of the National Library of Australia.

== See also ==
- List of newspapers in New South Wales
- List of newspapers in Australia
