= The Hospital Saturday News =

The Hospital Saturday News was published during 1930 for the Blue Mountains District Anzac Memorial Hospital Board by Charles Lawson Dash.

== History ==
Printed by Joseph Bennett and published for the Blue Mountains District Anzac Memorial Hospital Board by Charles Lawson Dash of Leura, this paper circulated throughout the Blue Mountains. When it began and when it ceased is unknown.

== Digitisation ==
The Hospital Saturday News has been digitised as part of the Australian Newspapers Digitisation Program project of the National Library of Australia.

== See also ==
- List of newspapers in New South Wales
- List of newspapers in Australia
