= The Northern Champion =

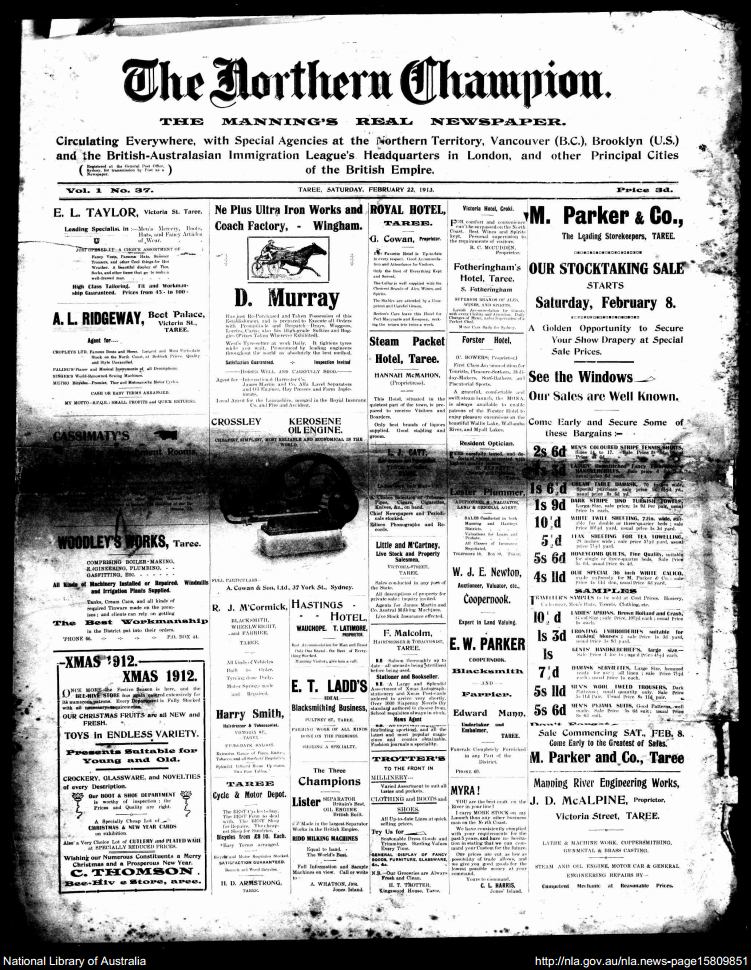
Front cover of The Northern Champion on 22 February 1913.

The Northern Champion was a bi-weekly newspaper published in Taree, New South Wales, Australia from 1912 until 1961.

== History ==
The Northern Champion was first published on 2 February 1912 by David A. Cowan. Mary Lucy Cowan (1872–1950) became proprietor and manager of the Northern Champion after the death of her brother David Cowan in 1922. In 1961 the Northern Champion was absorbed into the Manning River Times.

== Digitisation ==
The paper has been digitised as part of the Australian Newspapers Digitisation Program project of the National Library of Australia.

== See also ==
- List of newspapers in Australia
- List of newspapers in New South Wales
