= The Nowra Leader =

The Nowra Leader was an English language newspaper published between 1909 and 1969 in Nowra, New South Wales, Australia. It continued The Leader and Shoalhaven District Newspaper and was merged with the Nowra and Shoalhaven News to form the Nowra News Leader.

The Nowra Leader, 3 September 1909

== History ==
The Leader and Shoalhaven District Newspaper was founded by Thomas Charles Kennedy. It was first published in 1893 and ceased publication on 27 August 1909. It was continued by The Nowra Leader, which was launched on 3 September 1909 by publisher Herbert James Connolly. After Connolly's death in 1944, his sister Florence A. Connolly ran the paper until it was acquired by Stan Lord in late 1953. Lord later sold his interest in the paper to his nephew, Colin Lord. In 1969, Maxell Newton paid Colin Lord $110,000 for the paper, which he merged with the Nowra and Shoalhaven News on 3 November 1969 to form the bi-weekly Nowra News Leader.

== Digitisation ==
The Nowra Leader has been digitised as part of the Australian Newspapers Digitisation Program of the National Library of Australia.

== See also ==
- List of newspapers in New South Wales
- List of newspapers in Australia
