= Hawkesbury Advocate =

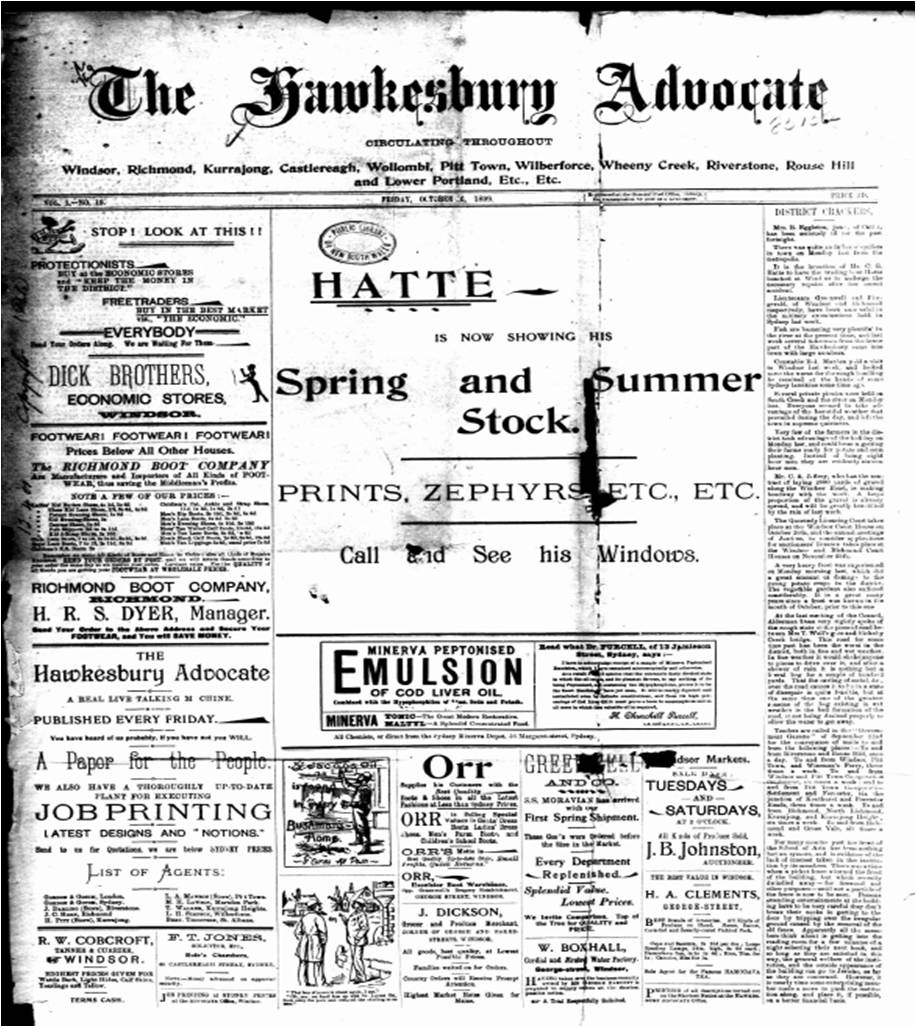
The Hawkesbury Advocate, 6 October 1899

The Hawkesbury Advocate was an English language broadsheet newspaper published in Windsor, New South Wales, Australia.

== History ==
The Hawkesbury Advocate was published from 1899 - 1900. Rod and Wendy Gow created an index to Hawkesbury local newspapers, including Hawkesbury advocate newspaper index 1899 to 1900 / GOW.

== Digitisation ==
The paper has been digitised as part of the Australian Newspapers Digitisation Program project of the National Library of Australia.

== See also ==
- List of newspapers in Australia
- List of newspapers in New South Wales
