= The Protestant Standard =

The Protestant Standard, 15 May 1869

The Protestant Standard, also published as The Protestant Banner, was a weekly English language newspaper published in Sydney, New South Wales, Australia.

== History ==
The newspaper was first published in Sydney on 1 May 1869 by Samuel Goold, under the title of The Protestant Standard. The newspaper changed its name to The Protestant Banner and continued under this later title from 31 August 1895 to 28 July 1906.

== Digitisation ==
The Protestant Standard (1869–1895) has been digitised as part of the Australian Newspapers Digitisation Program of the National Library of Australia.

== See also ==
- List of newspapers in Australia
- List of newspapers in New South Wales
