= The Campbelltown Herald =

The Campbelltown Herald, also published under various other titles, was a weekly English language broadsheet newspaper published in Campbelltown, New South Wales, Australia.

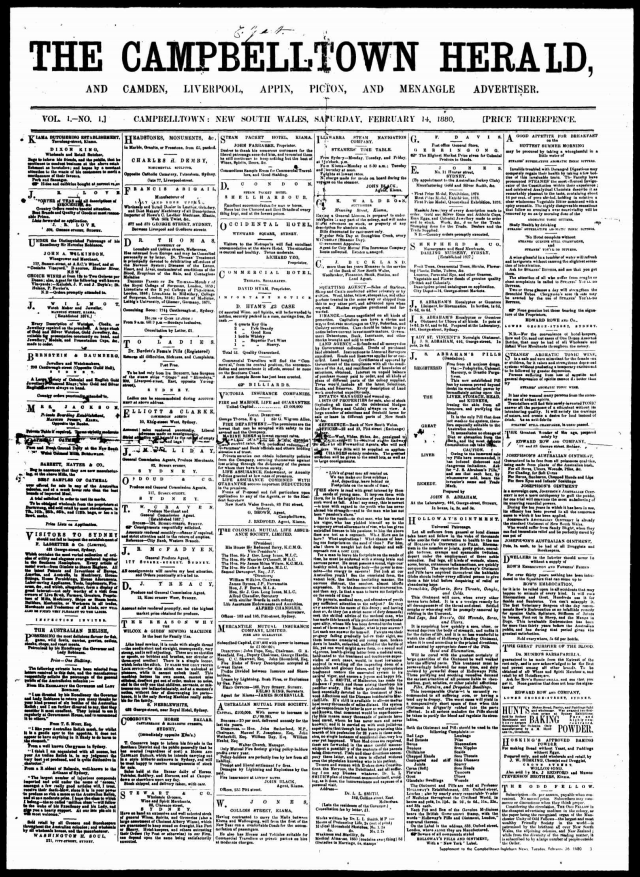
The Campbelltown Herald, 14 February 1880

== History ==
First published on 14 February 1880 by William Webb, The Campbelltown Herald was published between 1880 and 1919. It was the first paper published in the Campbelltown area. Early editions of the paper bore the banner title The Campbelltown Herald and Camden, Liverpool, Appin, Picton and Menangle Advertiser. On 30 March 1898, the banner title of the paper carried the sub-heading "with which is incorporated The Campbelltown Liberal".

In 1886 the editor, William Webb, was charged by Henry Parkes with criminal libel. Webb was found not guilty by the jury who presided at the trial.

In 1919 the paper changed its name to The Campbelltown News, and in 1953 it became The Campbelltown Ingleburn News.

== Digitisation ==
Many issues of the paper have been digitised as part of the Australian Newspapers Digitisation Program, a project of the National Library of Australia in cooperation with the State Library of New South Wales.

== See also ==
- List of newspapers in Australia
- List of newspapers in New South Wales
