= List of newspapers in New South Wales =

This is a list of newspapers in New South Wales in Australia.

== List of newspapers in New South Wales (A) ==
Newspaper	Town / suburb	Sydney region	Status	Years of publication
Adelong and Tumut Express	Tumut	No	defunct	1925–1949
Adelong and Tumut Express and Batlow District News	Tumut	No	defunct	1949–1954
The Adelong and Tumut Express and Tumbarumba Post	Adelong	No	defunct	1900–1925
The Adelong Argus, Tumut and Gundagai Advertiser	Adelong	No	defunct	1888–1925
The advertiser	Cessnock	No	current	1953–
The Advertiser, incorporating the Lake Times	Wollongong	No	defunct	2015–2020
The Advocate	Coffs Harbour	No	current	1985–
The Age	Queanbeyan	No	current	1860–
The Albury Banner and Wodonga Express	Albury	No	defunct	1860–1939
The Albury Banner	Albury	No	defunct	1949–1950
The Albury Banner, Wodonga express and Riverina stock journal	Albury	No	defunct	1939–1949
The Anglican	Sydney	Yes	defunct	1952–1970
The Area News	Griffith	No	current	1971–
Argyle Liberal and District Recorder	Crookwell	No	defunct	1903–1930
Ariah Park News	Temora	No	defunct	1923–1942
The Armidale Chronicle	Armidale	No	defunct	1872–1929
The Armidale Express	Armidale	No	current	1929–
The Armidale Express and New England General Advertiser	Armidale	No	defunct	1856–1929
The Arrow	Sydney	Yes	defunct	1896–1933
Auburn Review	Auburn	Yes	current	2011–
The Australasian Chronicle	Sydney	Yes	defunct	1839–1843
Australasian Muslim Times	Bonnyrigg	Yes	current	2014–
The Australian (1824 newspaper)	Sydney	Yes	defunct	1824–1848
The Australian Abo Call	Sydney	Yes	defunct	1938
The Australian Band of Hope Journal	Sydney	Yes	defunct	N/A
Australian Band of Hope Review, and Children's Friend	Sydney	Yes	defunct	1856
The Australian Communist	Sydney	Yes	defunct	1920–1921
The Australian Home Companion and Band of Hope Journal	Sydney	Yes	defunct	1856–1861
The Australian Jewish News	Darlinghurst	Yes	current	1990–
The Australian Producers' Home Journal	Sydney	Yes	defunct	1910
The Australian Star	Sydney	Yes	defunct	1887–1909
Australian Town and Country Journal	Sydney	Yes	defunct	1870–1919
The Australian, Windsor, Richmond, and Hawkesbury Advertiser	Windsor	Yes	defunct	1871–1899
The Australian Worker : an Australian paper for Australian homes	Killara	Yes	defunct	1913–1993
The Australian Workman	Sydney	Yes	defunct	1890–1897

== List of newspapers in New South Wales (B) ==
Newspaper	Town / suburb	Sydney region	Status	Years of publication	
Ballina Shire Advocate	Ballina	No	defunct	2005–2020	
Balmain Observer and Western Suburbs Advertiser	Balmain	Yes	defunct	1880–1984	
The Band of Hope Journal and Australian Home Companion	Sydney	Yes	defunct	1858	
Barraba Gazette	Barraba	No	defunct	1969–2020	
The Barrier Daily Truth	Broken Hill	No	current	1908–2024	
The Barrier Miner	Broken Hill	No	defunct	1888–1974	
The Bathurst Advocate	Bathurst	No	defunct	1848–1849	
The Bathurst Argus	Bathurst	No	defunct	1904	
The Bathurst Daily Argus	Bathurst	No	defunct	1904–1909	
Bathurst Free Press	Bathurst	No	defunct	1849–1851	
The Bathurst Free Press and Mining Journal	Bathurst	No	defunct	1851–1904	
The Bathurst Post	Bathurst	No	defunct	1881–1922	
The Bathurst Times	Bathurst	No	defunct	1858–1936	
Bay Post	Moruya	No	current	1998–	
The Bega Budget	Bega	No	defunct	1905–1923	
Bega District News	Bega	No	current	1923–	
The Bega Gazette and County of Auckland Advertiser	Bega	No	defunct	1864–1865	
The Bega Gazette and Eden District or Southern Coast Advertiser	Bega	No	defunct	1865–1900	
The Bega Standard and Candelo, Merimbula, Pambula, Eden, Wolumla, and General Advertiser	Bega	No	defunct	1874–1923	
Bell's Life in Sydney and Sporting Chronicle	Sydney	Yes	defunct	1860–1872	
Bell's Life in Sydney and Sporting Reviewer	Sydney	Yes	defunct	1845–1860	
The Bellingen Shire Courier-Sun	Bellingen	No	defunct	2000–2020	
The Bellinger Courier-Sun	Bellingen	No	defunct	1952–2000	
The Bird O' Freedom	Sydney	Yes	defunct	1891–1896	
The Biz	Fairfield	Yes	defunct	1917–1980	
The Blackheath Beacon	Katoomba	No	defunct	1930–1931	
The Blackheath Bulletin	Katoomba	No	defunct	1929–1930	
Blacktown advocate	Blacktown	Yes	defunct	1944–2020	
The Blayney Advocate and Carcoar Herald	Blayney	No	defunct	1898–1904	
The Blayney Advocate and Junction Advertiser	Blayney	No	defunct	1870–1892	
The Blayney Argus	Blayney	No	defunct	1887–1892	
Blayney Chronicle	Blayney	No	current	2003–	
Blayney West Macquarie	Blayney	No	defunct	1930–1973	
Bligh News	Randwick	Yes	defunct	1965	
The Bligh Watchman and Coonabarabran Gazette	Coonabarabran	No	defunct	1885–1910	
The Block	Sydney	Yes	defunct	1896	
The Blue Mountain Echo	Katoomba	No	defunct	1909–1928	
The Blue Mountain Express and Tourists' Guide	Katoomba	No	defunct	1892	
The Blue Mountain Star	Katoomba	No	defunct	1929–1932	
Blue Mountains Advertiser	Katoomba	No	defunct	1939–1978	
The Blue Mountains Courier	Springwood	No	defunct	1947–1960	
The Blue Mountains Daily	Katoomba	No	defunct	1939	
The Blue Mountains Echo	Katoomba	No	defunct	1939	
Blue Mountains Gazette	Springwood	No	current	1979–	
The Blue Mountain Gazette	Katoomba	No	defunct	1903–1904	
Blue Mountains-Lithgow District News	Katoomba	No	defunct	1969–1971	
Blue Mountains Record	Jamisontown	No	current	2006–	
The Blue Mountains Times	Katoomba	No	defunct	1931–1937	
Blue Mountains Whisper	Katoomba	No	defunct	1989–1991	
The Boggabilla Courier	Boggabilla	No	defunct	1899–1901	
The Boggabri Budget	Boggabri	No	defunct	1902–1905	
Boggabri Herald	Manilla	No	defunct	1965–1973	
The Bombala Herald and Delegate, Cooma, Eden and Coast Districts General Advertiser	Bombala	No	defunct	1863–1911	
Boggy Camp, Tingha and Bora Creek Miner	Boggy Camp	No	defunct	1899	
Bombala Times	Bombala	No	defunct	1863–2020	
Bondi View	Bondi Beach	Yes	current	2001–	
The Boorowa news	Boorowa	No	current	1951–	
The Border Mail	Albury	No	current	1988–	
The Border Morning Mail	Albury	No	defunct	1920–1988	
The Border Morning Mail and Riverina Times	Albury	No	defunct	1903–1920	
The Border News	Moree	No	defunct	1989–2020	
The Border Post, and Wodonga Advertiser	Albury	No	defunct	1856–1902	
The Border Post, Echuca, Moama and Murray River Advertiser	Moama	No	defunct	1893–1896	
Bourke Banner and Darling River Representative	Bourke	No	defunct	1897–1923	
Bowral Free Press	Bowral	No	defunct	1883–1906	
Bowraville Guardian and Nambucca Gazette	Bowraville	No	defunct	1917–1958	
The Boxer and Wrestler	Sydney	Yes	defunct	1933–1935	
The Braidwood and Araluen Express	Braidwood	No	defunct	1895–1904	
Braidwood Dispatch	Braidwood	No	defunct	1958–1969	
The Braidwood Dispatch and Mining Journal	Braidwood	No	defunct	1859–1958	
The Braidwood Express and People's Advocate	Braidwood	No	defunct	1904–1907	
Braidwood Independent	Braidwood	No	defunct	1867	
Braidwood Liberal	Braidwood	No	defunct		
The Braidwood News and Goldfields General Advertiser	–	Braidwood	No	defunct	1862–1864
Braidwood Observer and Miners' Advocate	Braidwood	No	defunct	1859–1886	
The Braidwood Review and District Advocate	Braidwood	No	defunct	1915–1954	
	Braidwood Times incorporating the Tallaganda times	Braidwood	No	defunct	2005–2020
The Branxton Advocate: Greta and Rothbury Recorder	Branxton	No	defunct	1916	
The Branxton Greta Vineyards News	Branxton	No	current	2006–	
The Brewarrina Argus and Barwon River Advocate	Brewarrina	No	defunct	1892	
The Brewarrina News	Brewarrina	No	defunct	1958–1975	
The Brewarrina Times and Barwon River Gazette	Brewarrina	No	defunct	1880–1907	
The Bridge	Barham	No	current	1930–	
The Brisbane Water Free Press	Gosford	No	defunct	1932–1933	
The Broadcaster	Fairfield	Yes	defunct	1935–1978	
The Broadcaster	Barmedman	No	defunct	1923–1934	
Broken Hill Age	Broken Hill	No	defunct	1893–1895	
The Broken Hill Argus Willyama	Broken Hill	No	defunct	1888	
The Broken Hill Budget	Broken Hill	No	defunct	1892	
Broken Hill Times	Broken Hill	No	current	2024–	
Broughton Creek Mail	Berry	No	defunct	1880–1907	
The Broughton Creek Register, and Kangaroo Valley and South Coast Farmer	Berry	No	defunct	1886–1890	
Brunswick and Byron Advocate	Mullumbimby	No	defunct	1964–1976	
The Brunswick Byron Echo	Mullumbimby	No	defunct	1987–1993	
The Brunswick Valley Echo	Mullumbimby	No	defunct	1986–1987	
The Budget	Sydney	Yes	defunct	1935–1937	
The Budget and Singleton Advertiser	Singleton	No	defunct	1894–1955	
The Bulletin	Sydney	Yes	defunct	1880–1984	
The Bulli and Clifton Times and Illawarra Miners' Advocate	Bulli	No	defunct	1886–1889	
The Bulli Times	Bulli	No	defunct	1994–1996	
Bulli Times and Shire Advertiser	Bulli	No	defunct	1907	
The Bulli Times and Woronora Advertiser	Bulli	No	defunct	1907	
Bundarra & Tingha Advocate	Bundarra	No	defunct	1900–1932	
The Bundarra Times	Uralla	No	defunct	1930–1931	
Bungendore Bulletin	Bungendore	No	defunct	1990–2007	
The Bungendore Mirror	Bungendore	No	current	1975–	
The Bungendore mirror and Lake George advertiser	Bungendore	No	defunct	1887–1888	
The Burrangong Argus and Burrowa, Murrumburrah, and Marengo General Advertiser	Burrangong	No	defunct	1864–1913	
The Burrangong Chronicle and Young and Lachlan district Advertiser	Burrangong	No	defunct	1873–1902	
The Burrangong Courier and Lambing Flat General Advertiser	Burrangong	No	defunct	1862	
The Burrawang Herald : and Robertson, Wild's Meadow, Yarrunga, and Kangaroo Valley Advertiser	Burrawang	No	defunct	1888–1892	
Burrowa News	Boorowa	No	defunct	1874–1951	
The Burrowa News and Marengo, Binalong, Murrumburrah and Cootamundra Reporter	Boorowa	No	defunct	1873–1951	
The Burrowa Times and Binalong, Frogmore, Reid's Flat and Rye Park Advertiser	Boorowa	No	defunct	1880–1942	
Burwood Scene	Burwood	Yes	current	2006–	
The Bush Telegraph Weekly					
Byron Bay Advocate	Ballina	No	defunct	1992–1995	
The Byron Bay Record	Byron Bay	No	defunct	1902–1924	
The Byron Express	Bangalow	No	defunct	1973	
The Byron Shire Echo	Mullumbimby	No	current	1993–	
The Byron Shire News	Byron Bay	No	current	1992–	

== List of newspapers in New South Wales (C) ==
Newspaper	Town / suburb	Sydney region	Status	Years of publication
Cabramatta Chronicle	Parramatta	Yes	defunct	1974–1975
Cabramatta-Fairfield Guardian	Cabramatta	Yes	defunct	1981
The Call: ha'penny daily	Sydney	Yes	defunct	1914–1914
The Camden Advertiser	Camden	No	defunct	1935–1957
Camden Advertiser	Camden	No	defunct	2003–2010
The Camden & Wollondilly times	Camden	Yes	defunct	1994–1999
Camden Crier	Camden	Yes	defunct	1974–1998
The Camden Haven Courier	Camden Haven	Yes	current	1954–
The Camden News	Camden	Yes	defunct	1881–1982
The Camden Times	Camden	Yes	defunct	1892–1892
The Camden Wollondilly Advertiser	Camden	Yes	defunct	1999–2003
Camden-Narellan Advertiser	Camden	No	current	2010–
Campbelltown-Macarthur Advertiser	Campbelltown	Yes	current	2003–
Campbelltown Camden Chronicle	Campbelltown	Yes	defunct	1985–1992
Campbelltown District Star	St Marys	Yes	defunct	1976–1986
The Campbelltown Herald	Campbelltown	Yes	defunct	1880–1919
Campbelltown Ingleburn news	Camden	Yes	defunct	1951–1982
Campbelltown-Macarthur Advertiser	Camden	Yes	current	2003–
The Campbelltown News	Campbelltown	Yes	defunct	1920–1954
The Campsie News and Lakemba Advance	Randwick	Yes	defunct	1927–1979
Canada Bay & District News	Five Dock	Yes	defunct	2001–2001
Canberra Sunday Life: covering the ACT and Southern Tablelands	Parramatta	Yes	defunct	1977–1978
The Candelo & Eden union and Southern Auckland advocate	Candelo	No	defunct	1882–1904
The Candidate : State Parliament election bulletin	Sydney	Yes	defunct	1901–1901
Canowindra News	Canowindra	No	current	1971–
Canowindra Star	Canowindra	No	defunct	1926–1973
Canowindra Star	Canowindra	No	defunct	1900–1903
Canowindra Star and Eugowra News	Canowindra	No	defunct	1910–1922
Canterbury-Bankstown Express	Bankstown	Yes	defunct	1997–1998
Canterbury express	Parramatta	Yes	defunct	1994–1997
The Cape Hawke Advocate	Forster	No	defunct	1952–1981
Capital Q: news for the queer capital	Rushcutters Bay	Yes	defunct	1992–1993
Capital Q Weekly	Rushcutters Bay	Yes	defunct	1993–2000
The Captain's Flat Mining Record	Captains Flat	No	defunct	1898–1898
The Carcoar Chronicle	Carcoar	No	defunct	1871–1943
Caringbah Pictorial News	Caringbah	Yes	defunct	1954–1955
Casino and Kyogle Courier and North Coast Advertiser	Casino	No	defunct	1904–1932
The Castlereagh	Gilgandra	No	defunct	1905–1929
Catholic Freeman's Journal	Sydney	Yes	defunct	1932–1942
The Catholic Press	Sydney	Yes	defunct	1895–1942
The Catholic Times	Sydney	Yes	defunct	1877–1880
The Catholic Weekly	Sydney	Yes	current	1942–
Central	Sydney	Yes	current	2004–
The Central advocate and Guyra district advertiser	Guyra	No	defunct	1904–1905
The Central Australian, and Bourke telegraph	Bourke	No	defunct	1867–1892
Central Coast Express	Gosford	No	defunct	1946–1995
Central Coast Express Advocate	Gosford	No	defunct	1995–2020
Central Coast Extra	Gosford	No	current	2002–
Central Coast Friday Star	Parramatta	No	defunct	1984–1987
Central Coast Herald	Newcastle	No	defunct	2002–2003
The Central Coast Independent	The Entrance	No	defunct	1987–1988
Central Coast Sun	Gosford	No	current	1949–
The Central Coast Sun Weekly	Erina	No	defunct	2001–2006
The Central Coast Sun Weekly	Gosford	No	defunct	1991–1992
The Central Coast Sun Weekly	Erina	No	defunct	2001–2006
Central Coast Sun Weekly	Gosford	No	defunct	2008–2009
The Central Post	Newcastle	No	defunct	1994–1995
The Central Tablelands Mail	Mudgee	No	defunct	1964–1964
Central West Photo News	Orange	No	current	2007–
Central West Sunday	Orange	No	defunct	1990–1997
Central Western	Orange	No	defunct	1938–1938
The Central Western Daily	Orange	No	current	1945–
Century	Hurstville	Yes	defunct	1938–1976
Cessnock Eagle	Cessnock	No	defunct	1961–1978
The Cessnock Eagle and South Maitland Recorder	Cessnock	No	defunct	1913–1961
The Cessnock Express and Mining & Farming Representative	Gosford	No	defunct	1905–1928
The Cessnock Herald	Cessnock	No	defunct	1988–1991
The Cessnock Post	Newcastle	No	defunct	1994–1995
The Challenge Newspaper	Sydney	Yes	defunct	1933–1933
The Christian Advocate and Wesleyan record	Sydney	Yes	defunct	1858–1877
Champion Post	Parkes	No	current	1934–
The Children's Newspaper	Sydney	Yes	defunct	1899–1900
The Chronicle	Parramatta	Yes	current	–
The Chronicle (Katoomba)	Katoomba	No	defunct	1929–1929
The Chronicle	Wingham	No	defunct	1982–1983
The Chronicle	Parramatta	Yes	current	1998–
The Chronicle and Manning River observer	Wingham	No	defunct	1965–1965
Chronicle extra: Taree, Wingham, Great Lakes	Taree	No	defunct	1983–1990
The Church of England Chronicle	Sydney	Yes	defunct	1856–1865
Church Standard	Sydney	Yes	defunct	1896–1901
Church Standard	Sydney	Yes	defunct	1912–1952
Circular Quay Weekly	Sydney	Yes	defunct	1947–1947
CIS Policy Monographs	St Leonards	Yes	current	1979–
City Express	Waterloo	Yes	defunct	1980–1982
City Extra	Sydney	Yes	defunct	1977–1977
City Hub	Sydney	Yes	current	1995–
City Independent newspaper	Sydney	Yes	defunct	1989–1990
City News	Wollongong	No	defunct	1979–1979
City of Fairfield Advance	Parramatta	Yes	defunct	1979–1989
The City of Liverpool Champion	Bankstown	Yes	defunct	1969–1973
City of Sydney Times	Maroubra	Yes	defunct	1998–2000
The City Post	Newcastle	No	defunct	1994–1995
City Times	Sydney	Yes	defunct	1959–1959
Clarence and Richmond Examiner	Grafton	No	defunct	1889–1915
Clarence and Richmond Examiner and New England Advertiser	Grafton	No	defunct	1859–1889
The Clarence River Advocate	Maclean	No	defunct	1876–1949
Clarence Valley Independent	Yamba	No	current	1994–
The Clarion	South Grafton	No	defunct	1898–1907
The Clarion	Sydney	Yes	defunct	1955–1986
The Clarion	Lithgow	No	defunct	1947–1968
The Clarion	Sydney	Yes	defunct	1925–1927
The Clarion	Chatswood	Yes	defunct	1971–1974
Clear Hills Standard and Daysdale and Saverneke Times	Urana	No	defunct	1906–1921
Coast Community Chronicle	Gosford	No	current	2020–
Coast Community News	Gosford	No	current	1949–
Coast Community Pelican Post	Gosford	No	current	2020–
The Coastal Trader	Gosford	No	defunct	1987–1987
Coastal Views	MacLean	No	defunct	1992–2020
Coastline	Port Macquarie	No	defunct	1993–1994
The Cobar Age	Dubbo	No	Defunct	1963–2012
The Cobar & Louth herald and Nymagee advertiser	Cobar	No	defunct	1892–1892
The Cobar Challenge	Cobar	No	defunct	1980–1983
The Cobar Herald	Cobar	No	defunct	1879–1914
The Cobar Leader	Cobar	No	defunct	1897–1907
The Cobar Weekly	Cobar	No	current	1986–
The Cobargo Chronicle	Cobargo	No	defunct	1898–1964
Cobargo Watch and South Coast journal	Cobargo	No	defunct	1890–1898
The Coffs Coast Advocate	Coffs Harbour	No	defunct	1985–2020
Coffs Coast independent	Coffs Harbour	No	current	2007–
Coffs Coast news of the area	Coffs Harbour	No	current	2020–
The Coff's Harbour Advocate	Coffs Harbour	No	defunct	1907–1972
Coffs Harbour Advocate	Coffs Harbour	No	defunct	1984–1985
The Coffs Harbour & District Independent News	Coffs Harbour	No	defunct	1996–2000
The Coffs Harbour & District Independent Weekly	Coffs Harbour	No	defunct	2002–2007
The Collarendabri Chronicle	Collarenebri	No	defunct	1899–1907
Collarenebri Gazette	Collarenebri	No	defunct	1935–1967
The Collectivist	Sydney	Yes	defunct	1897–1898
The Colonial Observer : or weekly journal of politics, commerce, agriculture, literature, science and religion for the colony of New South Wales	Sydney	Yes	defunct	1841–1844
The Colonist	Sydney	Yes	defunct	1835–1840
The Comic Australian	Waverly	Yes	defunct	1911–1913
Commercial Journal and Advertiser	Sydney	Yes	defunct	1835–1840
Commercial Journal and General Advertiser	Sydney	Yes	defunct	1845–1845
The Commonweal and Peak Hill Advocate	Parkes	No	current	1949–
The Communist: a journal for the theory and practice of Marxism	Sydney	Yes	defunct	1925–1928
The Communist	Sydney	Yes	defunct	1921–1923
Community vVoice	Oak Flats	No	current	1977–
The Condobolin argus	Condobolin	No	current	2001–
The Condobolin Argus and Lachlan Advertiser	Condobolin	No	defunct	1892–1900
Construction: weekly supplement to Building	Sydney	Yes	defunct	1909–1913
Construction and Local Government Journal: the weekly supplement to Building and the Australasian Engineer	Sydney	Yes	defunct	1913–1930
Construction and Real Estate Journal: building, engineering, local government & real estate development	Sydney	Yes	defunct	1930–1938
Construction	Sydney	Yes	defunct	1938–1974
Cooks River Valley Times	Bankstown	Yes	current	1949–
Coolamon Echo	Coolamon	No	defunct	1898–1905
Coolamon Farmers' Review	Coolamon	No	defunct	1910–1917
Coolamon-Ganmain Farmers' Review	Coolamon	No	defunct	1906–1910
Coolamon-Ganmain Farmers' review	Coolamon-Ganmain	No	defunct	1917–1942
Coolamon-Ganmain Review	Coolamon-Ganmain	No	defunct	1942–1951
Coolangatta/Tweed Border Mail	Tweed Heads	No	defunct	2004–2005
Cooma Express	Cooma	No	defunct	1879–1949
The Cooma Gazette, and Monaro Advertiser	Cooma	No	defunct	1873–1875
Cooma Monaro Express	Cooma	No	current	1950–
Coonabarabran Times	Coonabarabran	No	current	1956–
Coonamble Independent and Castlereagh River Advocate	Coonamble	No	defunct	1892–1909
Coonamble Times	Coonamble	No	defunct	1914–1968
Coonamble Times	Coonamble	No	current	1972–
The Coonamble Times and Castlereagh newspaper	Coonamble	No	defunct	1885–1914
Coonamble Times and Collarenebri express	Coonamble	No	defunct	1968–1972
Cootamundra Herald	Cootamundra	No	current	1877–
The Cootamundra liberal	Cootamundra	No	defunct	1888–1906
The Corowa Chronicle	Corowa	No	defunct	1905–1928
The Corowa Free Press	Corowa	No	defunct	1875–2004
Corrimal Post & Northern Suburbs Messenger	Woonona	No	defunct	1997–1998
Corurgan Times	Deniliquin	No	defunct	1981–1981
The Country Independent	Tamworth	No	defunct	2000–2000
Country Leader	Balgowlah	Yes	current	1985–
Country life and stock & station journal	Sydney	Yes	defunct	1924–1978
The Courier	Parramatta	Yes	defunct	1960–1962
The Courier	Hornsby	Yes	defunct	1932–1960
The Courier	Double Bay	Yes	defunct	1956–1960
The Courier	Beverly Hills	Yes	defunct	1949–1960
The Courier	Narrabri	No	current	1982–
The Courier	Narrabri	No	defunct	1967–1976
Cowra Free Press	Cowra	No	defunct	1911–1921
The Cowra Guardian	Cowra	No	current	1984–
Cowra Guardian	Cowra	No	defunct	1943–1980
Cowra Guardian and Lachlan Agricultural Recorder	Cowra	No	defunct	1885–1943
The Critic	Sydney	Yes	defunct	1909–1909
The Critic	Sydney	Yes	defunct	1922–1922
The Cronulla-Sutherland Advocate	Cronulla	Yes	defunct	1926–1939
The Cronulla-Sutherland Weekly	Cronulla	Yes	defunct	1994–1995
The Cronulla Weekly	Cronulla	Yes	defunct	1993–1994
Crookwell Gazette	Crookwell	No	defunct	1885–2020
Crowd Weekly	Sydney	Yes	defunct	1957–1958
The Culcairn Shire Advertiser	Culcairn	No	defunct	1909–1912
Cumberland Argus	Parramatta	Yes	defunct	1950–1962
The Cumberland Argus and Fruitgrowers' Advocate	Parramatta	Yes	defunct	1887–1950
The Cumberland Free Press	Parramatta	Yes	defunct	1895–1898
The Cumberland Herald	Parramatta	Yes	defunct	1902–1903
The Cumberland Independent	Parramatta	Yes	defunct	1883–1883
The Cumberland Mercury	Parramatta	Yes	defunct	1868–1895
Cumberland Times and Western Advertiser	Parramatta	Yes	defunct	1845–1911
The Cumberland Times Special Daily Strike Bulletin	Parramatta	Yes	defunct	1917–1917
The Cumberland Standard	Wentworthville	Yes	defunct	1959–1960
Cumberland Weekly News	Parramatta	Yes	defunct	1903–1904
The Currency Lad	Sydney	Yes	defunct	1832–1833

== List of newspapers in New South Wales (D) ==
Newspaper	Town / suburb	Sydney region	Status	Years of publication
The Daily	Mosman	Yes	defunct	1918–1960
The Daily Advertiser (Wagga Wagga)	Wagga Wagga	No	current	1911–
The Daily Advocate	Bathurst	No	N/A	N/A
Daily commercial news	Sydney	Yes	defunct	1976–1999
Daily commercial news and shipping list	Sydney	Yes	defunct	1891–1975
The Daily Examiner	Grafton	No	defunct	1915–2020
The Daily Express (Wagga Wagga, NSW)	Wagga Wagga	No	defunct	1919–1930
The Daily gazette of Commercial, shipping & customs news	Sydney	Yes	defunct	1879–1880
Daily Guardian	Sydney	Yes	defunct	1923–1931
Daily Liberal and Macquarie Advocate	Dubbo	No	current	1964–
Daily mail	Sydney	Yes	defunct	1922–1924
The Daily Mirror	Sydney	Yes	defunct	1941–1990
Daily News	Murwillumbah	No	defunct	1993–2007
The Daily news	Murwillumbah	No	defunct	1957–1986
Daily news	Sydney	Yes	defunct	1938–1940
Daily News	Tweed Heads South	No	defunct	2011–2014
The Daily news and evening chronicle	Sydney	Yes	defunct	1848
Daily Observer	Tamworth	No	defunct	1917–1920
The Daily post	Sydney	Yes	defunct	1895
Daily shipping news	Sydney	Yes	defunct	1896–1900
The Daily Telegraph (Sydney)	Sydney	Yes	current	1879–
Daily telegraph mirror	Surry Hills	Yes	defunct	1990–1996
Daily telegraph Sunday pictorial	Sydney	Yes	defunct	1927
Daily witness	Young	No	defunct	1923–1931
The Dalgety shire news and Snowy River record	Adaminaby	No	defunct	1937–1938
The Dapto & Wollongong star	Wollongong	No	defunct	1992–1993
Darlinghurst area reporter examiner	Kings Cross	Yes	defunct	1986–1987
The Darlo daily: the official KX4 Darlinghurst/East Sydney Neighbourhood Watch newsletter	Darlinghurst	Yes	defunct	1987–1996
Dawn: a magazine for the Aboriginal people of NSW	Sydney	Yes	defunct	1952–1969
The Dawn (feminist magazine)	Sydney	Yes	defunct	1888–1905
The Dead Bird	Sydney	Yes	defunct	1889–1891
The Deepwater, Vegetable Creek and Castlerag miner, Nine Mile and Torrington advocate	Deepwater	No	defunct	1889–1894
Delegate Argus and Border Post	Delegate	No	defunct	1895–1943
The Democrat	Lithgow	No	defunct	1915–1916
The Democrat: a political journal devoted to the interests of the democracy of NSW	Sydney	Yes	current	1904
The Democrat: an independent representative of labour & the people	Darlinghurst	Yes	defunct	1884–1904
Deniliquin Chronicle and Riverine Gazette	Deniliquin	No	defunct	1864–1936
Deniliquin Independent	Deniliquin	No	defunct	1899–1947
Deniliquin Pastoral Times	Deniliquin	No	current	1995–
Deniliquin Standard	Deniliquin	No	defunct	1991–1995
The Digest	Queanbeyan	No	defunct	1934
The Digger	Bora Creek	No	defunct	1900–1901
Direct action	Sydney	Yes	defunct	1914–1930
Direct action: an organ of industrial unionism	Balmain	Yes	defunct	1921–1922
Dispatch	Dubbo	No	defunct	1932–1933
The Dispatch	Sydney	Yes	defunct	1843–1844
The Dispatch	Padstow	Yes	defunct	1958–1960
The District Bulletin	Bungendore	No	current	2008–
District news	Five Dock	Yes	defunct	2001–2005
The District reporter	Camden	Yes	current	1998–
The District times of the Southern Highlands and Tablelands	Marulan	No	defunct	1993–1996
Dooral Roundup	Dural	Yes	current	1986–
Don Dorrigo Gazette and Guy Fawkes Advocate	Dorrigo	No	current	1910–
Drummoyne-Fivedock and district news	Drummoyne	Yes	defunct	1984–2000
The Dubbo advertiser	Dubbo	No	defunct	1874–1875
Dubbo dispatch	Dubbo	No	defunct	1933–1966
Dubbo dispatch and Wellington independent	Dubbo	No	defunct	1869–1832
Dubbo dispatch news-pictorial	Dubbo	No	defunct	1966–1971
The Dubbo Liberal and Macquarie Advocate	Dubbo	No	defunct	1874–1964
Dubbo Photo News	Dubbo	No	current	2005–
Duncan's weekly register of politics, facts and general literature	Sydney	Yes	defunct	1843–1845
The Dungog Chronicle : Durham and Gloucester Advertiser	Dungog	No	defunct	1893–2020
Durham Chronicle	Dungog	No	defunct	1888–1893

== List of newspapers in New South Wales (E–F) ==
Newspaper	Town / suburb	Sydney region	Status	Years of publication
The Eagle weekender	Cessnock	No	defunct	1978–1981
The Earlwood challenge	Croydon	Yes	defunct	1930–1931
Earlwood review	Earlwood	Yes	defunct	1958–1959
The East Sydney Argus	Sydney	Yes	defunct	1903–1907
Eastern & rail reporter	Kings Cross	Yes	defunct	1980–1981
Eastern express	Double Bay	Yes	defunct	1990–1993
The Eastern Herald	Broadway	Yes	current	1985
Eastern Riverina Chronicle	Cootamundra	No	current	2003–
Eastern Riverina Observer	Henty	No	defunct	1981–2003
The Eastern suburbs messenger	Bondi Junction	Yes	defunct	1996–2000
Eastern suburbs news	Sydney	Yes	defunct	1960–1961
Eastern suburbs observer	Paddington	Yes	current	1894–
The Eastern telegraph	Dungog	No	defunct	1912–1923
Eastern times	Darlinghurst	Yes	current	1995–
Eastland opinion	Coffs Harbour	No	defunct	1978–1982
The Echo	Sydney	Yes	defunct	1875–1893
The Eden free press and Eden district advertiser	Eden	No	defunct	1899
Eden journal	Eden	No	current	1997–
The Eden magnet: the south eastern advocate and advertiser	Eden	No	defunct	1919–1940
The Eden observer and South Coast advocate	Eden	No	defunct	1903–1910
Eden propeller and Twofold Bay advocate	Eden	No	defunct	1902–1903
The Elector	Sydney	Yes	defunct	1900
The Empire gazette	Sydney	Yes	defunct	1931–1940
The Empire	Sydney	Yes	defunct	1850–1875
The Engadine district news	Engadine	No	defunct	1964–2011
The Engadine district pictorial news	Helensburgh	No	current	2012–
The Enterprise	Katoomba	No	defunct	1913
Epic events	Sydney	Yes	defunct	1979
The epoch times	Hurstville	Yes	current	2004–
The Epping and district times	Epping	Yes	defunct	1923–1932
Epping Eastwood express	Auburn	Yes	defunct	1960–1961
The Era	Sydney	Yes	defunct	1856–1858
Euro sun	Batemans Bay	No	defunct	2003–2004
Eurobodalla Shire advertiser	Batemans Bay	No	defunct	1998–2001
Eurobodalla Shire independent	Batemans Bay	No	defunct	2003–2020
Eurobodalla sun	Batemans Bay	No	defunct	2001–2002
Eurobodalla sun	Batemans Bay	No	defunct	2002–2003
The Evening News	Sydney	Yes	defunct	1867–1931
The Evening News	Wagga Wagga	No	defunct	
The Evening post	Sydney	Yes	defunct	1874
Evening post	Goulburn	No	defunct	1957–1982
The Examiner	Sydney	Yes	defunct	1845
Examiner	Kiama	No	defunct	1859–1862
The Examiner	Moruya	No	defunct	1964–1989
The Express	Parramatta	Yes	current	1998–
The Express	Grafton	No	defunct	1976–1978
The Express	Sydney	Yes	defunct	1880–1887
Express	Wagga Wagga	No	defunct	1968–1973
The Express	Hurstville	Yes	defunct	1936–1961
The express	Parramatta	Yes	defunct	1967–1975
Express	Granville	Yes	defunct	1933–1935
Express Advocate Gosford Edition	Gosford	No	current	1995–
Express Advocate Wyong Edition	Wyong	No	current	1995–
Extra: Manning-Great Lakes	Taree	No	defunct	1990–2020
The Fairfax sun	Blacktown	Yes	defunct	1995–1997
The Fairfax sun	Parramatta	Yes	defunct	1995–1997
The Fairfax sun	Parramatta	Yes	defunct	1995–1997
The Fairfax sun	Penrith	Yes	defunct	1995–1997
Fairfield Advance	Fairfield	Yes	defunct	1975–1979
Fairfield advance	Parramatta	Yes	defunct	1989–1994
Fairfield advance	Parramatta	Yes	defunct	1996–2020
The Fairfield-Cabramatta chronicle	Liverpool	Yes	defunct	1966–1974
Fairfield-Cabramatta-Liverpool champion	Hurstville	Yes	defunct	1974–1979
Fairfield city advance	Parramatta	Yes	defunct	1994–1995
Fairfield City Champion	Fairfield	Yes	current	1991
Fairfield City guardian	Cabramatta	Yes	defunct	1982–1983
Fairfield-Liverpool champion	Hurstville	Yes	defunct	1979–1991
Farm and garden	Parramatta	Yes	defunct	1958–1977
Farm & garden	Parramatta	Yes	defunct	1982–1984–
The Farmer and Settler	Sydney	Yes	defunct	1906–1957
The Federal standard and western district advocate	Wentworth	No	defunct	1898–1911
Federal standard, Wentworth, Menindee, Pooncarie, Eustan and Mildura news	Wentworth	No	defunct	1892–1892
The Field	Sydney	Yes	defunct	1891–1892
The Financial and commercial times	Sydney	Yes	defunct	19231924
Finley free press and Tocumwal, Berrigan, Jerilderie and Deniliquin chronicle	Finley	No	defunct	1897–1901
Finley mail	Finley	No	defunct	1928–1970
Finley mail and Southern Riverina gazette	Finley	No	defunct	1897–1913
Finley mail, Tocumwal news and Southern Riverina gazette	Finley	No	defunct	1913–1928
The Five Dock recorder	Parramatta	Yes	defunct	1922–1975
Forbes Advocate	Forbes	No	current	1911–
Forbes and Parkes gazette	Forbes	No	defunct	1872–1899
Forbes gazette	Forbes	No	defunct	1900–1907
Forbes Times	Forbes	No	defunct	1861–1920
Forest & shire news	Frenchs Forest	Yes	current	1976–1983
Forest facts	Brookvale	Yes	defunct	1961–1968
Forward	Sydney	Yes	defunct	1942–1943
The Free people's paper	Surry Hills	Yes	defunct	1976–1977
The free press	Corowa	No	current	2004–
Free press and commercial journal	Sydney	Yes	defunct	1841
Free weekly	Marrickville	Yes	defunct	1842–2008
The Freeman's Journal	Sydney	Yes	defunct	1850–1932
The Freemason	Sydney	Yes	defunct	1892
Freemason's chronicle	Sydney	Yes	defunct	1883–1898

== List of newspapers in New South Wales (G) ==
Newspaper	Town / suburb	Sydney region	Status	Years of publication
The Galston, Glenorie & Hills Rural News	Galston	Yes	current	1971–
The Germanton courier	Balgowlah	Yes	defunct	1915
The Germanton times and Tumbarumba advocate	Balgowlah	Yes	defunct	1884–1885
Gibson's weekly	Marrickville	Yes	defunct	1903
The Gilgandra Weekly	Gilgandra	No	defunct	1911–1929
The Gilgandra Weekly	Gilgandra	No	current	1942–
The Gilgandra Weekly and Castlereagh	Gilgandra	No	defunct	1929–1942
The Girls' companion	Sydney	Yes	defunct	1910
Glad tidings	Marrickville	Yes	defunct	1885–1909
The Gleaner	Sydney	Yes	defunct	1827
The Glebe	Parramatta	Yes	defunct	2004–2009
The Glebe and inner city news	Parramatta	Yes	defunct	1994–1996
Glebe & Inner Western Weekly	Parramatta	Yes	defunct	1996–2004
The Glebe and western weekly	Glebe	Yes	defunct	1979–1994
The Glebe gazette, Forest Lodge, Pyrmont & Ultimo advertiser	Glebe	Yes	defunct	1902–1904
Glebe observer	Bexley North	Yes	defunct	1947–1958
The Glebe weekly	Glebe	Yes	current	1949–
Glen Innes Examiner	Glen Innes	No	current	1908–
Glen Innes Examiner and General Advertiser	Glen Innes	No	defunct	1874–1908
The Glen Innes guardian and central New England miners' advocate	Glen Innes	No	defunct	1892
The Glen Innes guardian, Vegetable Creek, Guyra, and Deepwater advocate	Glen Innes	No	defunct	1875–1906
Glen Innes News	Glen Innes	No	current	2024-
The Globe	Queanbeyan	Yes	defunct	1957
The Globe	Sydney	Yes	current	1949–
Globe	Sydney	Yes	defunct	1885–1887
Globe	Sydney	Yes	defunct	1911–1914
The Globe and Sunday Times War Pictorial	Sydney	Yes	defunct	1914–1917
Gloucester Advocate	Gloucester	No	current	1905–
Gloucester examiner and Lower Hunter advertiser	Raymond Terrace	No	defunct	1893–1912
The Gloucester gazette and Lower Hunter and Williams River advocate	Raymond Terrace	No	defunct	1892
The Golden age	Queanbeyan	No	defunct	1860–1864
Gosford and Peninsula times	Gosford	No	defunct	1984–1986
Gosford-Central Coast star	Parramatta	No	defunct	1983–1987
Gosford Central community news	Gosford	No	defunct	2010–2011
Gosford City sun weekly	Gosford	No	defunct	2006–2008
Gosford star	Parramatta	No	defunct	1962–1983
Gosford star	Gosford	No	defunct	1987–1992
Gosford Times and Gosford & Wollombi Express	Balgowlah	No	defunct	1888–1906
The Gosford Times and Wyong District Advocate	Gosford	No	defunct	1906–1962
Goulburn and Queanbeyan evening penny post	Goulburn	No	defunct	1878–1880
Goulburn and Queanbeyan evening penny post, and Southern counties general advertiser	Goulburn	No	defunct	1876–1878
The Goulburn and Yass argus and advocate for the southern districts of New South Wales	Goulburn	No	defunct	1865–1867
Goulburn Chronicle	Goulburn	No	defunct	
The Goulburn Chronicle and Southern Advertiser	Goulburn	No	defunct	1855–1864
Goulburn Express	Goulburn	No	current	2020–
Goulburn Evening Penny Post	Goulburn	No	defunct	1881–1940
Goulburn evening penny post, and Southern counties general advertiser	Goulburn	No	defunct	1870–1876
Goulburn Evening Post	Goulburn	No	defunct	1940–1957
Goulburn Herald	Goulburn	No	defunct	1860–1864
Goulburn Herald	Goulburn	No	defunct	1881–1908
The Goulburn Herald and Chronicle	Goulburn	No	defunct	1864–1881
The Goulburn Herald and County of Argyle Advertiser	Goulburn	No	defunct	1848–1859
Goulburn post	Goulburn	No	current	1982–
The Grafton argus and Clarence River general advertiser	Grafton	No	defunct	1874–1922
The Granville express and district advocate	Granville	Yes	defunct	1892
Granville independent and Parramatta advertiser	Granville	Yes	defunct	1900–1901
Great lakes advocate	Forster	No	current	1982–
The Great northern	Mosman	Yes	defunct	1918–1972
Greater Sydney daily news	Parramatta	Yes	defunct	1994–1994
Green left weekly	Broadway	Yes	current	1991–
The Grenfell Observer	Grenfell	No	current	1949–
The Grenfell Record	Grenfell	No	defunct	1948–1957
Grenfell Record and Bland Advertiser	Grenfell	No	current	1957–
The Grenfell Record and Lachlan District Advertiser	Grenfell	No	defunct	1876–1948
The Grenfell vedette	Grenfell	No	defunct	1887–1905
Greta and Branxton gazette	Greta	No	defunct	1881–1892
The Griffith times	Griffith	No	defunct	1971–1973
The Grip	Grafton	No	defunct	1887–1904
The guardian	Wyong	Yes	defunct	1929–1973
The guardian	Gorokan	No	defunct	1982–1987
The guardian	Cowra	No	defunct	1980–1984
Guardian	Newtown	Yes	defunct	1980–1984
The Guardian : a weekly journal of politics, commerce, literature, science and arts for the middle and working classes of New South Wales	Sydney	Yes	defunct	1844
Guardian Gazette	Nambucca Heads	No	defunct	1958–1966
Guardian news	Nambucca Heads	No	current	1997–
The Guardian pictorial	Newtown	Yes	defunct	1970–1979
The Guide	Sydney	Yes	defunct	1886–1888
Gulargambone advocate	Gilgandra	No	defunct	1925–1926
The Gulgong advertiser	Gulgong	No	defunct	1898–1919
The Gulgong argus and Home Rule mining record	Gulgong	No	defunct	1875–1876
The Gulgong evening argus and Home Rule mining record	Gulgong	No	defunct	1874–1875
Gulgong guardian and district mining record	Gulgong	No	defunct	1871–1873
The Gulgong mercantile advertiser and general business directory	Gulgong	No	current	1949–
The Gulgong miner and Home Rule and western gold fields advertiser	Gulgong	No	defunct	1873
The Gundagai herald and Clarendon, Tumut and Adelong advertiser	Gundagai	No	current	1949–
The Gundagai Independent	Gundagai	No	current	1928–
The Gundagai Independent and Pastoral, Agricultural & Mining Advocate	Gundagai	No	defunct	1898–1928
Gundagai Times and Tumut, Adelong and Murrumbidgee District Advertiser	Gundagai	No	defunct	1868–1931
Gunnedah advertiser	Gunnedah	No	defunct	1881–1907
The Gunnedah courier and "Boggabri news"	Gunnedah	No	defunct	1901
Gunnedah independent advertiser	Gunnedah	No	defunct	1922–1964
Gunnedah Times	Gunnedah	No	current	2020–
The Gunning times and southern advertiser	Gunning	No	defunct	1888
Guyra Argus	Guyra	No	defunct	1993–2020
Guyra Argus	Guyra	No	defunct	1902–1957
The Guyra Guardian	Armidale	No	defunct	1959–1983
Guyra Shire Chronicle	Guyra	No	defunct	1983–1988
Guyra Weekly News	Guyra	No	defunct	1989–1992
Guyra Gazette	Guyra	No	current	2017–
The Gwydir Examiner and Moree General Advertiser	Moree	No	defunct	1892–1899
The Gwydir News	Bingara	No	defunct	2018–2020

== List of newspapers in New South Wales (H) ==
Newspaper	Town / suburb	Sydney region	Status	Years of publication
Ha! Ha!: a merry newspaper magazine for Australians	Sydney	Yes	defunct	1898
Harbour city times : the newspaper about healthy gay and lesbian identity	Woolahra	Yes	current	1991–1992
Harbour views: midweek community news	Coffs Harbour	No	defunct	1999–2000
Harbour views: your local weekend newspaper	Coffs Harbour	No	defunct	1985–1988
Harden Express	Harden	No	defunct	1917–1947
Harden-Murrumburrah advocate	Harden	No	defunct	1973–1976
The Harden-Murrumburrah Express	Harden	No	current	1947–
Hastings gazette	Wauchope	No	defunct	1980–2006
The Hastings herald	Port Macquarie	No	defunct	1987–1988
Hastings shire gazette	Wauchope	Yes	defunct	1907–1980
Hawkesbury Advocate	Windsor	Yes	defunct	1899–1900
The Hawkesbury Chronicle and Farmer's Advocate	Windsor	Yes	defunct	1881–1888
Hawkesbury courier	North Richmond	Yes	current	1980–
Hawkesbury Courier and Agricultural and General Advertiser	Windsor	Yes	defunct	1844–1846
Hawkesbury District Independent	Windsor	Yes	current	2010–
The Hawkesbury Gazette	Windsor	Yes	current	1983–
Hawkesbury Herald	Windsor	Yes	defunct	1902–1945
Hawkesbury Independent	Windsor	Yes	defunct	1994–2007
Hawkesbury journal	Richmond	Yes	current	1958–1960
Hawkesbury radar	Richmond	Yes	defunct	1982–1983
The Hay Standard	Hay	No	defunct	1871–1900
Haynes' weekly	Sydney	Yes	defunct	1885
The Hebrew Standard of Australasia	Sydney	Yes	defunct	1895–1953
The Helensburgh and district news	Helensburgh	Yes	current	1989–
The Henty Observer and Culcairn Shire Register	Henty	No	defunct	1914–1950
The herald	Newcastle	No	current	2003–
The herald: Central Coast	Newcastle	No	defunct	2003–2004
Highlands district times	Bankstown	Yes	defunct	1996–1998
Highlands post	Goulburn	No	defunct	1984–2020
Hill End and Tambaroora times and miners' advocate	Hill End	No	defunct	1870–1875
The Hillgrove guardian and New England mining gazette	Hillgrove	No	defunct	1889–1906
The Hills District farm & garden	Parramatta	Yes	defunct	1984–1985
Hills District independent	Windsor	Yes	current	2015–
Hills district mercury	Parramatta	Yes	defunct	1990–1995
Hill's life in New South Wales	Sydney	Yes	defunct	1832
Hills News	Kellyville	Yes	current	1942–
Hills Shire Times	Parramatta	Yes	defunct	1985–2020
Hills stand youth newspaper	Castle Hill	Yes	defunct	1992–1993
Hills to Hawkesbury Community News	Castle Hill	Yes	current	1983–
Hillston-Ivanhoe spectator	Hillston	No	current	1997–
The Hillston news and Euabalong, Lake Cudgellico, Booligal, Mossgiel, and Ivanhoe advertiser	Hillston	No	defunct	1882–1883
Hillston spectator	Hillston	No	defunct	1954–1996
The Hillston Spectator and Lachlan River Advertiser	Hillston	No	defunct	1898–1952
The Hillston spectator and Mount Hope, Willanthry, Cudgellico, Booligal, Euabalong, Ivanhoe, Mossgiel, Gunbar and Lachlan River Advertiser	Hillston	No	defunct	1889–1953
Holbrook, Billabong & Upper Murray Chronicle	Holbrook	No	defunct	1989–2003
The Holbrook courier	Holbrook	No	defunct	1916–1966
The Home Rule pilot and western miners' advocate	Home Rule	No	defunct	1874
Hornsby & district times	Hornsby	Yes	defunct	1970–1978
Hornsby and Ku-ring-gai Shires advocate	Hornsby	Yes	defunct	1923–1928
Hornsby & Upper North Shore Advocate	Manly	Yes	defunct	1987–2020
Hornsby district advocate	Hornsby	Yes	defunct	1952–1959
Hornsby Ku-ring-gai Post	Hornsby	Yes	current	2020–
Hornsby Shire advocate	Hornsby	Yes	defunct	1959–1960
The Hospital Saturday News	Katoomba	No	defunct	1930
Howe's weekly commercial express	Sydney	Yes	defunct	1825
Hume herald	Germanton	No	defunct	1903–1907
The Hummer	Wagga	No	defunct	1891–1892
The hunter advocate	Newcastle	No	defunct	2005–2006
Hunter Manning magazine	Maitland	No	defunct	1976–1985
The Hunter River gazette and journal of agriculture, commerce, politics, and news	West Maitland	No	defunct	1841–1842
The Hunter River Times	Singleton	No	current	2020–
Hunter Valley & North Coast town and country	Taree	No	current	2012–
Hunter Valley herald	Newcastle	No	current	1973
Hunter Valley life		No	defunct	1995
Hunter Valley news	Muswellbrook	No	current	1973–
The Hunter Valley star news	Maitland	No	defunct	1995–1997
The Hunter Valley weekend: the Maitland mercury	Maitland	No	current	1992–
The Hustler	Sydney	Yes	defunct	1893

== List of newspapers in New South Wales (I–J) ==
Newspaper	Town / suburb	Sydney region	Status	Years of publication
The Illawarra and Cronulla argus	Cronulla	Yes	defunct	1928
Illawarra banner, central Illawarra & South Coast advertiser	Wollongong	No	defunct	1875
Illawarra Daily Mercury	Wollongong	No	defunct	1950–1955
Illawarra district and south coast advocate	Wollongong	No	defunct	1944–1947
The Illawarra express and southern coast general advertiser	Wollongong	No	defunct	1861–1862
The Illawarra Mercury	Wollongong	No	current	1855–
The Illawarra star	Port Kembla	No	defunct	1937–1938
The Illustrated express	Sydney	Yes	defunct	1886–1887
The Illustrated sporting life	Sydney	Yes	defunct	1866
The Illustrated Sydney advertiser	Sydney	Yes	defunct	185u-185u
The Illustrated Sydney News	Sydney	Yes	defunct	1881–1894
The Illustrated Sydney News	Sydney	Yes	defunct	1853–1872
The Illustrated Sydney News and New South Wales Agriculturist and Grazier	Sydney	Yes	defunct	1872–1881
Imlay magnet	Eden	No	defunct	1971–1993
The Independent (Katoomba)	Katoomba	No	defunct	1930–1931
The Independent	Deniliquin	No	defunct	1899–1947
Independent	Windsor	Yes	defunct	1994–2007
The Independent	Bankstown	Yes	defunct	1969–1971
The Independent	Coffs Harbour	No	defunct	2000–2002
The Independent: Australia's national quality monthly	Surry Hills	Yes	defunct	1993–1996
Independent monthly	Surry Hills	Yes	defunct	1989–1993
Indo post: news, business, arts & entertainment	Ultimo	Yes	current	1998–
Indus age	Marrickville South	Yes	current	200u-
The Industrialist: the official organ of Newcastle Industrial Council	Newcastle	No	defunct	1921–1922
The Inlander	Condobolin	No	defunct	1901–1914, 1992–1993
Inner city guardian	Surry Hills	Yes	defunct	1987–1988
Inner city voice	Darlinghurst	Yes	defunct	1986–1987
Inner Sydney action	Sydney	Yes	defunct	1975
Inner West Courier	Alexandria	Yes	defunct	2003–2020
Inner West Times	Inner West	Yes	defunct	2016–2020
Inner West Independent	Broadway	Yes	current	2009–
Inner-West Weekly	Parramatta	Yes	defunct	2004–2009
Inner western suburbs courier	Alexandria	Yes	defunct	1993–2003
Inner western weekly	Parramatta	Yes	defunct	1994–1996
Intelligence	Bowral	No	defunct	1884
The International Socialist : Official organ of revolutionary socialism in N.S.W.	Sydney	Yes	defunct	1910–1920
The International communist: an organ of the Third Communist International	Sydney	Yes	defunct	1921–1922
The Inverell Argus	Inverell	No	defunct	1874–1925
The Inverell dispatch and central New England advertiser	Inverell	No	defunct	1875
The Inverell Times	Inverell	No	current	1875–
The Irish-Australian	Sydney	Yes	defunct	1894–1895
The Irish-Australian	Tempe	Yes	defunct	1995–1996
Irish echo	Balmain	Yes	current	1992–
The Irish exile	Burwood	Yes	defunct	1988–1992
Irrigation Record	Leeton	No	defunct	1913–1917
The Irrigator	Leeton	No	current	2001–
Jerilderie-Coleambally Herald and Urana Advertiser	Balgowlah	No	defunct	1969–1972
Jerilderie Herald and Urana Advertiser	Jerilderie	No	defunct	1892–1968
Jindabyne and Snowy Mountains news	Cooma	No	defunct	1983–1985
The Junee democrat	Junee	No	defunct	1892–1904
Junee Post	Wagga Wagga	No	defunct	1971–1973
The Junee Southern Cross	Junee	No	current	1902–
Junee Southern Cross and Coolamon Advertiser	Junee	No	defunct	1898–1901
Junior Telegraph	Sydney	Yes	defunct	195–1955
Justice: the people's paper	Narrabri	No	defunct	1891

== List of newspapers in New South Wales (K–L) ==
Newspaper	Town / suburb	Sydney region	Status	Years of publication
The Kangaroo Valley pioneer and farmers' and graziers' advocate	Kangaroo Valley	No	defunct	1892–1892
The Kangaroo Valley times	Kangaroo Valley	No	defunct	1898–1904
Katoomba and district weekly	Katoomba	No	defunct	1971–1971
Katoomba City News	Katoomba	No	defunct	1924–1924
The Katoomba Daily	Katoomba	No	defunct	1920–1939
The Katoomba Times	Katoomba	No	defunct	1889–1894
Kempsey free	Kempsey	No	defunct	1958–1959
Kiama advertiser	Wollongong	No	defunct	2006–2012
Kiama Examiner	Kiama	No	defunct	1858–1862
Kiama Independent	Kiama	No	defunct	1947–2020
The Kiama Independent and Illawarra and Shoalhaven Advertiser	Kiama	No	defunct	1863
The Kiama Independent and Shoalhaven Advertiser	Kiama	No	defunct	1863–1947
The Kiama pilot, Shoalhaven gazette and impartial reporter	Kiama	No	defunct	1867–1868
Kiama Reporter	Kiama	No	defunct	1886–1887
The Kiama Reporter and Illawarra Journal	Kiama	No	defunct	1878–1947
The Kiama sentinel	Berry	No	defunct	1930–1932
King's Cross times	Sydney	Yes	current	
Kings Cross weekly	Edgecliff	Yes	defunct	1962–1962
King's Cross whisper	Sydney	Yes	defunct	1965–1977
King's Cross world	Potts Point	Yes	defunct	1967–1968
The Kingsway news	Miranda	No	defunct	1993–1995
Koori mail: the fortnightly national Aboriginal and Torres Strait Islander newspaper	Lismore	No	current	1991–
The Ku-ring-gai courier	Hornsby	Yes	defunct	1960–1971
The Ku-ring-gai Hornsby recorder	Pymble	Yes	defunct	1950–1961
Ku-ring-gai news	Gordon	Yes	current	1931–
Kurnell lookbox	Sydney	Yes	defunct	1954–1955
Kurri Kurri times and South Maitland coalfields advertiser	Kurri Kurri	No	defunct	1905–1938
Kyogle	Kyogle	No	defunct	1999–2009
The Kyogle examiner	Kyogle	No	defunct	1905–1978
The Kyogle newspaper	Kyogle	No	defunct	1984–1999
Labor Daily	Sydney	Yes	defunct	1922–1938
The Labor News	Sydney	Yes	defunct	1918–1924
Labor News : the voice of the ironworker	Sydney	Yes	defunct	1943–1993
The Labor weekly : official organ of the New South Wales Labor Council and the Australian Labor Party, State of NSW	Sydney	Yes	defunct	1930–1953
The Lachlan leader	Cowra	No	defunct	1937–1943
Lachlan Observer and Miners' Advocate	Forbes	No	defunct	1862
Lachlan reporter	Forbes	No	defunct	1866–1869
The Lachlander	Condobolin	No	current	1952–
Lachlander and Condobolin and Western Districts Recorder	Condobolin	No	defunct	1895–1952
Ladies' own paper	Sydney	Yes	defunct	1904–1905
The Lake Macquarie Advocate	Toronto	No	defunct	1987–1992
The Lake Macquarie Gazette	Belmont	No	defunct	1988–1992
The Lake Macquarie herald	Newcastle	No	defunct	1974
Lake Macquarie News	Parramatta	No	defunct	1992–2008
Lake Macquarie post	Charlestown	No	defunct	1980–1986
The Lake news	Temora	No	current	1928–
Lake times	Kiama	No	current	1979–
The Lakes advocate	Gorokan	No	defunct	1982–1987
Lakes mail	Morisset	No	defunct	1995–2020
The Lakeside post	Newcastle	No	defunct	1994–1995
The Land	Richmond	Yes	current	1911–
The Leader	Balgowlah	No	defunct	1956–1967
The Leader	Wagga Wagga	No	current	2005–
The Leader	Orange	No	defunct	1912–1922
The Leader (Liverpool, New South Wales, newspaper)	Liverpool	Yes	defunct	1951–1977
The Leader and Shoalhaven district newspaper	Nowra	No	defunct	1893–1909
The Leader: the leader in local news in the Liverpool and Ingleburn districts	Liverpool	Yes	current	1981–
Leichhardt and Petersham guardian and suburban advertiser	Petersham	Yes	defunct	1886–1893
Leichhardt district truth	Bankstown	Yes	defunct	1971
Leichhardt-inner western weekly	Leichhardt	Yes	defunct	1976–1978
The Leichhardt local	Glebe	Yes	defunct	1975–1977
Leichhardt-Marrickville weekly	Leichhardt	Yes	defunct	1976–1976
The Liberator	Ashfield	Yes	defunct	1946–1946
The Liberator: a weekly paper devoted to educational advancement, rationalism, political & industrial democracy, social questions, & matters of general interest	Sydney	Yes	defunct	1918
The Licensed victuallers' advocate, and sporting gazette of New South Wales	Sydney	Yes	defunct	1881
The licensing review	Sydney	Yes	defunct	1901–1905
Life: an original weekly journal of politics, sporting, literature, law & the drama	Sydney	Yes	defunct	1878
Lightning flash	Lightning Ridge	No	defunct	1969–1991
The Lightning flash newspaper	Lightning Ridge	No	defunct	1994–1998
The Lightning Ridge news	Lightning Ridge	No	defunct	1994–1996
The Link	Balmain	Yes	defunct	1935–1977
Lismore chronicle and Richmond river courier	Lismore	No	defunct	1892–1907
The Lismore echo	Lismore	No	defunct	1991–1994, 2016–2020
The Lismore post	Lismore	No	defunct	1901
The Lithgow Village Voice	Lithgow	No	current	2014–
The Lithgow argus and Hartley district advertiser	Lithgow	No	defunct	1902
The Lithgow clarion	Lithgow	No	defunct	1932–1947
The Lithgow enterprise, and Australian land nationaliser	Lithgow	No	defunct	1887
Lithgow Mercury	Lithgow	Yes	current	1878–
The Lithgow spade	Lithgow	No	defunct	2008–2008
The Lithgow times and western unionist	Lithgow	Yes	defunct	1892–1895
Liverpool-Cabramatta-Fairfield champion	Hurstville	Yes	defunct	1974–1979
Liverpool, Campbelltown, Macarthur Leader	Liverpool	Yes	defunct	1977–1981
Liverpool City Champion	Liverpool	Yes	current	1991–
Liverpool-Fairfield champion	Hurstville	Yes	defunct	1979–1991
Liverpool-Fairfield champion	Hurstville	Yes	defunct	1973–1974
Liverpool Herald	Liverpool	Yes	defunct	1892–1912
The Liverpool leader	Liverpool	Yes	defunct	1951–1977
Liverpool Leader	Liverpool	Yes	defunct	1981–2020
The Liverpool News	Liverpool	Yes	defunct	1904–1973
Liverpool Times and Liverpool Mercury	Liverpool	Yes	defunct	1898–1912
Lloyd's list Australia : the daily commercial news	Sydney	Yes	current	2011–
Lloyd's list daily commercial news	Sydney	Yes	current	1999–
The Local	Glebe	Yes	defunct	1977
The Local citizen Gordon, Pymble, St Ives	St Ives	Yes	defunct	2006–2007
The Local citizen Northern suburbs	Corrimal	No	defunct	2007
The Local citizen Wollongong	Corrimal	No	current	2007–
Local government and real estate	Sydney	Yes	defunct	1915–1918
The local government journal of Australasia	Sydney	Yes	defunct	1910–1915
The Local leader	Chippendale	Yes	defunct	1968–1970
The Local news	Chippendale	Yes	defunct	1968–1973
The Local's choice newspaper	Engadine	No	defunct	1996–1997
Lockhart leader and Urana gazette	Lockhart	No	defunct	1899–1905
The Lockhart Review and Oaklands Advertiser	Lockhart	No	defunct	1910–1963
The Lone hand	Sydney	Yes	defunct	1907–1921
The Lower Clarence review	Yamba	No	defunct	1994–2004
The Lower Hunter news pictorial	Maitland	Yes	defunct	1982–1983
The Lower Hunter news pictorial	Maitland	No	defunct	1973–1978
Lower Hunter Star	Maitland	No	defunct	1997–2020
The Lower Hunter weekend star	Maitland	No	current	2004–
Lyndhurst Shire Chronicle	Blayney	No	current	1897–

== List of newspapers in New South Wales (M) ==
Newspaper	Town / suburb	Sydney region	Status	Years of publication
The Macarthur advertiser	Campbelltown	Yes	defunct	1972–2003
Macarthur chronicle	Parramatta	Yes	defunct	2002–2006
Macarthur Chronicle	Parramatta	Yes	defunct	1992–1998
Macarthur Chronicle Camden Edition	Camden	Yes	defunct	2006–2014
Macarthur Chronnicle. Camden & Wollondilly Edition	Camden & Wollondilly	Yes	defunct	2014–2020
Macarthur Chronicle Campbelltown Edition	Campbelltown	Yes	defunct	2006–2020
Macarthur Chronicle Wollondilly Edition	Wollondilly	Yes	current	2006–2014
The Macksville elevator	Macksville	No	defunct	1953–1958
The Macleay Argus	Kempsey	No	current	1885–
The Macleay argus and Macleay chronicle: special flood issue	Kempsey	No	defunct	1949
The Macleay Chronicle	Balgowlah	No	defunct	1878–1952
Macleay district advertiser	West Kempsey	No	defunct	1960–1965
The Macleay herald	Kempsey	No	defunct	1875–1888
The Magnet & the voice	Eden	No	defunct	1940–1969
Magnet : Merimbula, Eden, Pambula, Tura Beach	Eden	No	current	1993–
Mailbox shopper	Dubbo	No	current	1995–
The Maitland advertising medium	West Maitland	No	defunct	1870–1877
The Maitland Daily Mercury	Maitland	No	defunct	1894–1939
The Maitland ensign	West Maitland	No	defunct	1861–1868
The Maitland herald	Maitland	No	defunct	1988–1991
The Maitland mail	Maitland	No	defunct	1882–1886
The Maitland Mercury and Hunter River General Advertiser	Maitland	No	defunct	1843–1893
The Maitland Mercury	West Maitland	No	defunct	1939–1960
The Maitland post	Newcastle	No	defunct	1994–1995
The Maitland Weekly Mercury	Maitland	No	defunct	1894–1931
The Maitland weekly post	Maitland	No	defunct	1877–1880
The Maltese herald	Berkley Vale	No	defunct	1991–2013
The Manaro Mercury, and Cooma and Bombala Advertiser	Cooma	No	defunct	1860–1931
Manilla Express	Manilla	No	current	1899–
Manly Daily	Manly	Yes	defunct	1906–2020
Manly gazette and Pittwater express	North Sydney	Yes	defunct	1892–1901
Manly news	Manly	Yes	current	1899–
The Manning and Hastings advocate	Wingham	No	defunct	1882–1892
The Manning River chronicle	Wingham	No	defunct	1886–1887
The Manning River independent and advocate of native industries	Taree	No	defunct	1890–1893
The Manning River news and advocate for the Northern Coast districts of New South Wales	Balgowlah	No	defunct	1865–1873
Manning River News	Cundletown	No	defunct	1874–1887
Manning River Times	Cundletown	No	defunct	1869–1893
Manning River Times	Taree	No	current	1939–
The Manning River Times and Advocate for the Northern Coast Districts of New South Wales	Taree	No	defunct	1869–1968
Marrickville Dulwich times	Marrickville	Yes	defunct	1979–1982
The Marrickville express and Dulwich Hill record	Marrickville	Yes	defunct	1899–1903
Marrickville free press	Newtown	Yes	defunct	1968–1972
Marulan & district times	Marulan	No	defunct	1993
The Mayfield messenger	Mayfield	No	defunct	1963–1964
Menai-Revesby express	Bankstown	Yes	defunct	1994–1997
The Mendooran and Merrygoen news	Gilgandra	No	defunct	1929
The mercury	Maitland	No	defunct	1960–1972
The Mercury news-pictorial	Maitland	Yes	defunct	1978–1982
Merimbula News Weekly	Merimbula	No	current	1996–
The Merriwa & Cassilis news	Muswellbrook	No	defunct	1934–1967
The Merriwa & Cassilis standard	Merriwa	No	defunct	1895–1911
The Messenger	Maroubra	Yes	defunct	1932–1996
The Methodist	Sydney	Yes	defunct	1892–1975
The Methodist and Congregationalist	Balgowlah	Yes	defunct	1976–1977
The Metropolitan	Surry Hills	Yes	defunct	1985
Metropolitan independent	Rockdale	Yes	defunct	1971
Mid coast observer	Kempsey	Yes	current	1986–
The Middle East herald	Parramatta	Yes	defunct	1996–2007; 2009–
Midstate observer	Orange	No	current	1986–
Midweek Xpress : Albury Wodonga's weekly free newspaper	Albury	Yes	defunct	2008–2012
The Million	Sydney	Yes	defunct	1901–1902
Millthorpe post	Millthorpe	No	defunct	1900–1901
The Millthorpe post	Millthorpe	No	defunct	1992–1995
Milton Ulladulla advertiser	Ulladulla	No	defunct	2000–2001
Milton-Ulladulla Express	South Nowra	No	defunct	1988–1998
Milton Ulladulla times	Ulladulla	No	current	1975–
The Miner and general advertiser	Lambing Flat, Burrangong	No	defunct	1861–1862
Miners Advocate and Northumberland Recorder	Newcastle	No	defunct	1873–1876
The Mining Record and Grenfell General Advertiser	Grenfell	No	defunct	1867–1876
Mirage News	Wollongong	No	current	2014–
The Mirror of Australia	Sydney	Yes	defunct	1915–1917
The Mirror	Sydney	Yes	defunct	1917–1919
The Mittagong argus	Mittagong	No	defunct	1901–1904
The Mittagong express	Mittagong	No	defunct	1892–1920
The Mittagong star	Mittagong	No	defunct	1922–1960
Moama Echuca free press	Moama	No	defunct	1981–1982
The Molong Argus	Molong	No	defunct	1890–1934
Molong Express and Western District Advertiser	Molong	No	current	1876–
The Monaro post: the independent paper of the Monaro and surrounding regions	Cooma	No	current	2006–
The Monitor	Sydney	Yes	defunct	1826–1828
Monthly chronicle	Berkley Vale	No	current	1989–
Moree Champion	Moree	Yes	current	1968–
The Moree Examiner and General Advertiser	Moree	No	defunct	1899–1901
Moree Gwydir Examiner and General Advertiser	Moree	No	defunct	1901–1940
The Moree news	Moree	No	defunct	1899–1907
The Morning Chronicle	Sydney	Yes	defunct	1843–1846
The Morpeth and East Maitland want and Hunter River district guardian	Morpeth	No	defunct	1899–1904
The Morpeth gazette and Hunter River district guardian	Morpeth	No	defunct	1904–1909
The Morpeth leader and East and West Maitland gazette	Morpeth	No	defunct	1863–1864
Morpeth times and Hunter Valley representative	Morpeth	No	defunct	1884–1885
The Moruya advertiser	Moruya	No	defunct	1956–1968
Moruya examiner	Moruya	No	current	2001–
Moruya examiner	Moruya	No	defunct	1863–1964
The Moruya examiner: incorporating "Bay post" and "Braidwood dispatch"	Balgowlah	Yes	current	1989–
The Moruya liberal	Moruya	No	defunct	1879–1880
The Moruya-Tilba times	Moruya	No	defunct	1902–1915
Moruya Times and South Coast Journal	Moruya	No	defunct	1888–1915
Mosman Daily	Mosman	Yes	current	2004–
The Mosman and lower North Shore daily	Mosman	Yes	defunct	1974–2004
Mosman daily news pictorial	Mosman	Yes	defunct	1973–1974
The Mosman mail	Mosman	Yes	defunct	1898–1906
The Mosman, Neutral and Middle Harbour resident	Mosman	Yes	defunct	1904–1907
Moss Vale post	Goulburn	No	defunct	1929–1959
The Moss Vale record	Moss Vale	No	defunct	1892–1900
The Moulamein times	Moulamein	No	defunct	1956–1957
The Mountain Daily	Katoomba	No	defunct	1919–1920
The Mountain gazette	Springwood	No	defunct	1963–1978
The Mountaineer (Katoomba)	Katoomba	No	defunct	1894–1908
Mount Druitt – St. Marys Standard	Mount Druitt	Yes	current	1983–
Mudgee guardian and Gulgong advertiser	Mudgee	No	current	1963–
Mudgee guardian and north-western representative	Mudgee	No	defunct	1890–1963
The Mudgee Guardian and The Weekly	Mudgee	No		
The Mudgee independent	Mudgee	No	defunct	1877–1892
The Mudgee liberal	Mudgee	No	defunct	1861–1901
Mudgee mail	Mudgee	No	defunct	1931–1964
Mudgee newspaper and mining register	Mudgee	No	defunct	1858–1861
The Mudgee times	Mudgee	No	defunct	1873–1878
Mullumbimby Brunswick Valley advocate	Ballina	No	defunct	1994–1995
Mullumbimby Star	Mullumbimby	No	defunct	1906–1936
Mullumbimby Star and Byron Bay-Bangalow Advocate	Mullumbimby	No	defunct	1936–1950
The Mungindi news, NS Wales Queensland border record	Mungindi	No	defunct	1898–1907
Murray & Hume times	Wodonga, VIC, Albury	No	defunct	1875–1875
The Murrumbidgee Irrigator	Leeton	No	defunct	1915–2001
Murrumburrah Signal and County of Harden Advocate	Murrumburrah	No	defunct	1881–1947
The Murrurundi Times and Liverpool Plains Gazette	Murrurundi	No	defunct	1871–1933
The Muswellbrook Chronicle	Muswellbrook	No	defunct	pre-1898-2020
The Muswellbrook Chronicle and Upper Hunter advertiser	Muswellbrook	No	current	1872–
mX	Sydney	Yes	defunct	2005–2015
Myall Coast news of the area	Myall Lakes	No	current	2014–
Myall Coast nota	Gloucester	No	current	2000–

== List of newspapers in New South Wales (N–O) ==
Newspaper	Town / suburb	Sydney region	Status	Years of publication
The Nambucca and Bellinger News	Bowraville	No	defunct	1911–1945
The Nambucca District News	Macksville	No	defunct	1945–1966
The Nambucca Guardian News	Macksville	No	defunct	1967–1992
The Nambucca Heads coaster	Macksville	No	defunct	1953–1958
Nambucca News	Bowraville	No	defunct	_1911
The Nambucca Valley Guardian News	Macksville	No	defunct	1992–1993
Nambucca Valley news of the area	Nambucca Valley	No	defunct	2021–
Namoi echo and Wee Waa gazette	Wee Waa	No	defunct	1899–1906
The Namoi independent and advertiser	Gunnedah	No	defunct	1892–1907
The Namoi Valley echo.	Wee Waa	No	defunct	1937–1972
Namoi valley independent.	Gunnedah	No	defunct	1964–2020
Narandera Argus and Riverina Advertiser	Narrandera	No	defunct	1879–1953
Narrandera Argus	Narrandera	No	current	
The Narandera ensign	Narrandera	No	defunct	1888–1913
Narooma area news	Narooma	No	defunct	1989–1994
Narooma examiner	Moruya	No	defunct	1954–1955
Narooma news	Narooma	No	current	1994–
The Narrabri age and Namoi district newspaper	Narrabri	No	defunct	1894–1907
The Narrabri herald and northern districts' advertiser	Narrabri	No	defunct	1873–1913
Narrandera Argus and Riverina Advertiser	Narrandera	No	defunct	1880–1953
Narrandera Argus	Balgowlah	No	current	1954–
Narraweena news	Narraweena	No	defunct	1963–1966
The Narromine News	Narromine	No	defunct	1979–1984
Narromine News and Trangie Advocate	Narromine	No	defunct	1896–1979; 1984–2020
The Nation	Sydney	Yes	defunct	1887–1890
The National advocate	Bathurst	No	defunct	1889–1963
National Indigenous Times	Batemans Bay	No	current	2002–
The National times	Broadway	Yes	defunct	1971–1986
National Times on Sunday	Broadway	Yes	defunct	1986–1986
Nepean Herald	Penrith	Yes	defunct	1968–1975
Nepean Times	Penrith	Yes	defunct	1882–1962
Neucleus	Armidale	No	defunct	1947–2005
The New Beckett's budget weekly	Sydney	Yes		
The New England times.	Armidale	No	defunct	1990–1993
New England weekly survey	Guyra	No	defunct	1957–1958
The New Englander	Armidale	No	defunct	1976–1999
The New Hawkesbury review	Richmond	Yes	defunct	1971–1982
The New look Port Macquarie express	Port Macquarie	No	defunct	1985–1985
The New South Wales Aborigines' advocate : a monthly record of missionary work amongst the Aborigines	Leichhardt	Yes	defunct	1901–1908
The New South Wales examiner	Sydney	Yes	defunct	1842–1842
New South Wales good templar : and sons of temperance journal.	Sydney	Yes	defunct	1888–1888
New Zealand direct	Leichhardt	Yes	defunct	1995–1996
The Newcastle Argus and District Advertiser	Newcastle	No	defunct	1916–1920
The Newcastle Chronicle	Newcastle	No	defunct	1866–1876
The Newcastle Chronicle and Hunter River District News	Newcastle	No	defunct	1858–1866
Newcastle despatch and northern counties general advertiser	Newcastle	No	defunct	1880–1881
The Newcastle evening call	Newcastle	No	defunct	1886
The Newcastle express	Newcastle	No	defunct	1937–1937
The Newcastle Herald	Newcastle	No	current	1980–
Newcastle Morning Herald and Miners Advocate	Newcastle	No	defunct	1876–1980
The Newcastle pilot	Newcastle	No	defunct	1867–1879
The Newcastle post	Newcastle	No	defunct	1981–1987
The Newcastle standard	Newcastle	No	defunct	1901–1903
Newcastle Star	Newcastle	No	defunct	1979–1998
The Newcastle Sun	Newcastle	No	defunct	1918–1980
Newcastle Sunday mirror	Newcastle	No	defunct	1959–1961
Newcastle times	Charlestown	No	defunct	1993–1995
The Newcastle Wallsend sun and district advertiser	Newcastle	No	defunct	1898–1903
Newcastle weekly mail	Newcastle	No	defunct	1903–1904
The News	Balgowlah	No	defunct	1867–1867
The News	Auburn	Yes	defunct	1945–1975
The News-advocate : the Pymble news and northern suburbs advocate	Pymble	Yes	defunct	1903
News leader	Sydney	Yes	current	1969–
News pictorial	Maitland	No	defunct	1983–1995
News weekly	Merimbula	No	defunct	1992–1996
The Newsletter: an Australian Paper for Australian People	Newcastle	No	defunct	1900–1918
The Newspaper	Raleigh	No	defunct	1986–1993
Newtown chronicle and Macdonaldtown, Marrickville, St.Peters, Enmore and Glebe argus	Newtown	Yes	defunct	1899–1907
Nornews rural	Armidale	No	defunct	1988–1999
North Coast Advocate	Mullumbimby	No	defunct	1977–1978
North coast advocate	Ballina	No	defunct	1982–2005
North Coast Advocate and Summerland News	Lismore	No	defunct	1978–1982
The North coast beacon	Ballina	No	defunct	1899–1906
North coast daily news	Lismore	No	defunct	1907–1907
North Coast magazine	Port Macquarie	No	defunct	1983–1987
North coast pilot	Ballina	No	defunct	1963–1966
The North coast times	Fernmount	No	defunct	1888–1889
North Coast town & country.	Taree	No	current	1995–
The North Shoalhaven review	Huskisson	No	defunct	1993–1993
North Shore advocate	Manly	Yes	defunct	1980–1987
The North Shore and Manly times	North Sydney	Yes	defunct	1892–1904
North Shore Friday times	Parramatta	Yes	defunct	1984–1986
North Shore Times	Sydney	Yes	current	1960–
North Shore times and Manly press.	St Leonards	Yes	defunct	1885–1886
North Shore woman's week	Gordon	Yes	defunct	1959–1959
North Side Courier	Alexandria	Yes	defunct	2006–2008
The North Sydney	North Sydney	Yes	defunct	1901–1901
North Sydney recorder and northern suburbs advertiser	North Sydney	Yes	defunct	1892–1892
North west and Hunter Valley magazine	Gunnedah	No	defunct	1975–1988
North West Champion	Moree	No	defunct	1915–1968
North west magazine	Gunnedah	No	current	1989–
The North western courier	Narrabri	No	defunct	1913–1967
The North western courier	Narrabri	No	defunct	1976–1982
The North-western watchman	Coonabarabran	No	defunct	1936–1949
The Northcoaster	Lismore	No	defunct	1987–1988
The Northern advocate	Narrabri	No	defunct	1891
The Northern Beaches weekender	Brookvale	No	defunct	1991–2007
The Northern champion	Taree	No	defunct	1912–1961
The Northern courier and county of Raleigh advocate	Fernmount	No	defunct	1897–1946
The Northern Daily Leader	Tamworth	No	current	1921–
Northern District Times	Eastwood	Yes	defunct	1921–2020
Northern express	West Ryde	Yes	defunct	1961–1961
The Northern free press	Mosman	Yes	current	1931–
Northern herald	Broadway	Yes	defunct	1985–1998
Northern leader	Corrimal	No	defunct	1998–2007
Northern magazine	Tamworth	No	defunct	1973–1986
Northern News	Castle Hill	Yes	defunct	2003–2009
The Northern news	Neutral Bay	Yes	defunct	1977
The Northern people	Newcastle	No	defunct	1897–1898
Northern post	Killarney Heights	No	defunct	1974–1974
The Northern Rivers echo.	Lismore	No	defunct	1995–2020
The Northern Star	Lismore	No	defunct	1876–2020
Northern times	Bulli	No	defunct	1994–1996
The Northern Times (Newcastle)	Newcastle	No	defunct	1857–1918
Northern Times and Newcastle Telegraph	Newcastle	No	defunct	
The Northern weekly	Lismore	No	defunct	1925
Northern Wollongong news	Corrimal	No	defunct	1987–1996
Northside.	Lindfield	Yes	defunct	2008–2012
Now	Potts Point	Yes	defunct	1968–1975
The Nowra colonist	Nowra	No	defunct	1879–1914
The Nowra Leader	Nowra	No	defunct	1909–1969
NSW Government Gazette	Sydney	Yes	current	1832–
The Nyngan advocate	Nyngan	No	defunct	1956–1964
Nyngan news	Nyngan	No	defunct	1980–1990
The Nyngan Observer	Nyngan	No	defunct	1883–1897
Nyngan observer	Dubbo	No	current	1991–2020
Nyngan observer, Bogan River and district representative	Nyngan	No	defunct	1898–1936
Oberon review	Oberon	No	current	1984–
The Observer	Henty	No	defunct	1950–1981
The Observer	Cronulla	Yes	defunct	1939–1976
The Observer	Marrickville	Yes	defunct	1904–1905
The Observer: Coly-Point's own newspaper	Coleambally/Darlington Point	No	defunct	[2013?]-2020
Oceania	Sydney	Yes	defunct	1913–1915
The Oceanside post	Newcastle	No	current	1949–
The Odd fellow	Sydney	Yes	defunct	1845–1846
Off the record	Yamba	No	defunct	1988–1991
The Omnibus and Sydney spectator.	Sydney	Yes	defunct	1841–1843
Once-a-week	Sydney	Yes	defunct	1892
The opal miner	White Cliffs	No	defunct	1903–
Opinion	Coffs Harbour	No	defunct	1961
The Oracle	Sydney	Yes	defunct	1898–1899
The Orange advocate	Orange	No	current	1949–
The Orange Leader	Orange	No	defunct	1891–1899
Orange Leader and Millthorpe Messenger	Orange	No	defunct	1899–1901
Orange star	Orange	No	defunct	1926–1927
Orbit	Chatswood	Yes	defunct	1966–1966
The Orient	Dulwich Hill	Yes	defunct	1999–2001
Our aim : a monthly record of the Aborigines' Inland Mission of Australia.	West Maitland	No	defunct	1907–1961
Our boys' & girls' own newspaper	Summer Hill	Yes	defunct	1893-190u
Out of work : the voice of the unemployed	Sydney	Yes	defunct	1922–1922
The Outrigger	Strawberry Hills	Yes	defunct	1993–1994

== List of newspapers in New South Wales (P) ==
Newspaper	Town / suburb	Sydney region	Status	Years of publication
Pacific Times	Parramatta	Yes	defunct	1961–1975
The Paddington Bearer: a community news service for Paddington, from the Village Community Centre	Paddington	Yes	defunct	1987–1988
The Paddington Paper	Paddington	Yes	current	1949–
Paddington Press	Paddington	Yes	current	1977–
The Palerang and district bulletin	Bungendore	No	defunct	2008–2010
The Pambula Voice	Pambula	No	defunct	1892–1940
The Pambula Voice	Bega	No	current	1949–
Panorama	Ainslie	No	current	1988–
Parkes Champion Post	Parkes	No	current	1946–
The Parkes Examiner: Forbes, Condobolin, Trundle and Peak Hill Advertiser	Parkes	No	defunct	1891–1934
The Parkes Independent and Lachlan and Bogan Advertiser	Parkes	No	current	1949–
The Parkes Independent and Peak Hill Golden Age	Parkes	No	defunct	1900–1901
Parkes Western People	Parkes	No	defunct	1956–1975
Parra News	Parramatta	Yes	current	2020–
Parramatta Advertiser	Parramatta	Yes	defunct	1844–1995
Parramatta Advertiser	Parramatta	Yes	defunct	1995–2020
Parramatta and Hills News	Parramatta	Yes	defunct	1956–1982
Parramatta and Holroyd Mercury	Parramatta	Yes	current	1949–
Parramatta Argus	Parramatta	Yes	defunct	1977
The Parramatta Chronicle and county of Cumberland Advertiser	Parramatta	Yes	defunct	1859–1867
Parramatta Chronicle and Cumberland General Advertiser	Parramatta	Yes	defunct	1843–1845
Parramatta City News	Parramatta	Yes	defunct	1928
The Parramatta Daily Tribune	Parramatta	Yes	defunct	1900–1901
Parramatta-Hills Friday Advertiser	Parramatta	Yes	defunct	1984–1985
Parramatta Mail	Parramatta	Yes		
Parramatta Messenger and Cumberland Express	Parramatta	Yes	current	1949–
The Parramatta Press	Parramatta	Yes	defunct	1949–1957
The Parramatta Press	Parramatta	Yes	defunct	1973
Parramatta Sun	Parramatta	Yes	defunct	1997–2010
Party	Sydney	Yes	defunct	1942
Party Builder	Sydney	Yes	defunct	1942–1965?
Pastoral Times	Deniliquin	No	defunct	1861–1995
Pastoral Times and Deniliquin Telegraph	South Deniliquin	No	defunct	1859–1861
The Pastoralist	Sydney	Yes	defunct	1889–1891
The Pastoralist Weekly	Stanmore	Yes	current	1949–
Peak Hill and district times	Peak Hill	No	current	1955–
The Peak Hill Express	Peak Hill	No	defunct	1902–1956
Peak Hill golden age and Tomingly and McPhail Advertiser	Parkes	No	defunct	1899–1900
Peak Hill Times and Bogan and Macquarie Advertiser	Peak Hill	No	current	1949–
Peninsula Times Weekender	Gosford	No	defunct	1986
Peninsula Community Access News	Woy Woy	No	current	1999–
Peninsular News	Newport	No	defunct	1957–1965
Penrith City Gazette	Penrith	Yes	defunct	2013–2017
Penrith City Star	Bankstown	Yes	defunct	1985–1995
Penrith City Star	Penrith	Yes	current	1997–
Penrith District Star	St Marys	Yes	defunct	1973–1985
Penrith Press	Penrith	Yes	defunct	1947–2020
The People and the Collectivist	Sydney	Yes	defunct	1898–1900
The People: official organ of the Australian Socialist League	Sydney	Yes	defunct	1900–1919
People's Advocate	Sydney	Yes	defunct	1856
The People's Advocate and New South Wales Vindicator	Sydney	Yes	defunct	1848–1856
The People's Weekly	Sydney	Yes	defunct	1923
Photo-news	Dubbo	No	defunct	1955–1962
The Picton Advocate	Picton	No	defunct	1896–1898
The Picton Argus	Picton	No	defunct	1885–1896
Picton News	Picton	No	defunct	1982–1998
The Picton Penny Post	Picton	No	defunct	1896
The Picton Post	Picton	No	defunct	1907–1982
The Picton Post and Advocate	Picton	No	defunct	1899–1907
The Pictorial News	Kirrawee	Yes	defunct	1978–1987
Pictorial News	Caringbah	Yes	defunct	1955–1959
Pictorial News	Caringbah	Yes	defunct	1958–1959
The Pilot	Sydney	Yes	defunct	1901–1902
Pittwater News	Newport	Yes	defunct	1965–1968
The Pittwater Pioneer	Dee Why	Yes	current	1949–
Pix	Sydney	Yes	defunct	1938–1972
Plain Talk	Sydney	Yes	defunct	1929
The Port Hacking Cough			defunct	1918–1919
Port Kembla Bulletin	Port Kembla	No	current	1949–
Port Kembla Pilot	Wollongong	No	defunct	1925
The Port Macquarie Express	Port Macquarie	No	current	1985–
Port Macquarie Independent (now Your Local Independent)	Port Macquarie	No	current	2009–
Port Macquarie News	Port Macquarie	No	current	1951–
The Port Macquarie news and Hastings River advocate	Port Macquarie	No	defunct	1882–1950
Port Stephens Examiner	Port Stephens	No	defunct	1969–1969
Port Stephens Examiner	Port Stephens	No	current	1980–
The Port Stephens Gazette	Port Stephens	No	current	1949–
Port Stephens news of the area	Port Stephens	No	current	2015–
Port Stephens Pictorial Examiner	Port Stephens	No	defunct	1978–1981
The Port Stephens Pilot	Port Stephens	No	defunct	1926–1930
The Port Stephens Times	Port Stephens	No	defunct	1993–1995
The Portland Mercury	Portland	Yes	defunct	1929
The Post	Newcastle	No	defunct	1987–1994
The Post	Newcastle	No	defunct	1994–1996
The Post	Newcastle	No	defunct	1995–1996
The Post	Newcastle	No	current	1995–
The Post	Newcastle	No	defunct	1996–1999
The Post Weekly	Goulburn	No	defunct	1949–[?]; 1997–2020
The Presbyterian and Australian Witness	Surry Hills	Yes	defunct	1888–1892
The Press	Burwood	Yes	defunct	1933
Products, projects and trends in building	Chippendale	Yes	defunct	1971–1972
The Propeller	Hurstville	Yes	defunct	1911–1969
Protest	Sydney	Yes	defunct	1906–1907
The Protestant Banner	Sydney	Yes	defunct	1895–1906
The Protestant Standard	Sydney	Yes	defunct	1869–1895
Punch	Sydney	Yes	current	1856–
The Pymble News	Pymble	Yes	defunct	1901–1902
The Pymble News and Northern Suburbs Advocate	Pymble	Yes	defunct	1902–1903
The Pyrmont and Ultimo Gazette	Ultimo	Yes	defunct	1882

== List of newspapers in New South Wales (Q–R) ==
Newspaper	Town / suburb	Sydney region	Status	Years of publication
Queanbeyan Age	Queanbeyan	No	defunct	1867–1904
Queanbeyan Age	Queanbeyan	No	defunct	1907–1915
The Queanbeyan Age	Queanbeyan	No	current	1927–2016
Queanbeyan Age and General Advertiser	Queanbeyan	No	defunct	1864–1867
Queanbeyan Age and Queanbeyan Observer	Queanbeyan	No	defunct	1915–1927
Queanbeyan Age incorporating The Chronicle	Queanbeyan	No	defunct	2016–2020
Queanbeyan-Canberra Advocate	Queanbeyan	No	defunct	1905–1927
The Queanbeyan Leader	Queanbeyan	No	defunct	1905–1927
The Queanbeyan Observer	Queanbeyan	No	defunct	1884–1915
The Queanbeyan times: Bungendore, Gundaroo, Ginderra, Michelago & Murrumbidgee advertiser	Queanbeyan	No	defunct	1888–1899
The Quirindi Advocate	Quirindi	No	current	1925–
The Quirindi Argus	Quirindi	No	defunct	1892–1897
Quirindi gazette and Liverpool Plains advocate	Quirindi	No	defunct	1898–1925
Quirindi herald and district news	Quirindi	No	defunct	1905–1925
Quirindi magpie	Balgowlah	No	defunct	1899–1905
Quiz	North Sydney	Yes	defunct	1904–1906
The Radical	Hamilton	No	defunct	1887–1888
The Raleigh Sun	Bellingen	No	defunct	1892–1946
The Randwick Coogee Weekly	Coogee	Yes	defunct	1930
The Randwick Rapier	Sydney	Yes	defunct	1973
Raymond Terrace Examiner and Lower Hunter and Port Stephens Advertiser	Raymond Terrace	No	defunct	1912–1967
Raymond Terrace Examiner and Port Stephens Advertiser	Raymond Terrace	No	defunct	1967–1969
Raymond Terrace-Nelson Bay Examiner	Raymond Terrace	No	defunct	1971–1978
Raymond Terrace-Port Stephens Examiner	Raymond Terrace	No	defunct	1969–1977
The Raymond Terrace Weekend Star	Maitland	No	defunct	2006–2007
The Record of the Blue Mountains	Katoomba	No	defunct	1922–1925
The Referee	Sydney	Yes	defunct	1886–1939
Regional Independent	Bungendore	No	current	2020–
Reid standard: official organ of the Reid electorate council of the official A.L.P.	Reid	Yes	defunct	1946–1950
The Reliant	Croydon Park	Yes	defunct	1930
The Reporter and Illawarra Journal	Kiama	No	defunct	1887–1894
The Republican: Australia's national independent weekly	Sydney	Yes	defunct	1997–2000
Review Pictorial	Auburn	Yes	current	1960–
The Revolutionary Socialist	Sydney	Yes	defunct	1919–1930
The Richmond River Express	Casino	No	defunct	1904–1929
The Richmond River Express and Casino Kyogle Advertiser	Casino	No	defunct	1904–1929
The Richmond River Express and Tweed Advertiser	Casino	No	defunct	1873–1904
The Richmond River Express Examiner	Casino	No	defunct	1978–2020
The Richmond River Herald and Northern Districts Advertiser	Coraki	No	defunct	1886–1942
Richmond River Independent	Casino	No	current	2020–
Richmond River Times and Northern Districts Advertiser	Ballina	No	defunct	1898–1906
The Ridge News	Lightning Ridge	No	current	1996–
The Rising Sun	Vaucluse	Yes	defunct	1921
River Times	Ryde	Yes	defunct	1888–1894
The Riverina Advocate	Griffith	No	defunct	1969
The Riverina Daily News	Griffith	No	defunct	1969–1971
The Riverina Express	Griffith	No	defunct	1958–1963
Riverina Leader	Wagga Wagga	No	defunct (continues as The Leader)	1980–2004
Riverina Recorder	Balranald	No	defunct	1887–1965
Riverina Stock and Station Recorder	Wagga Wagga	No	defunct	1956–1957
The Riverina Times	Griffith	No	defunct	2005–2006
Riverina Times, Hay Standard and Journal of Water Conservation	Hay	No	defunct	1900–1902
Riverine Advertiser	Deniliquin	No	defunct	1875–1901
The Riverine Grazier	Hay	No	current	1873–
The Riverine Herald : Echuca and Moama Advertiser	Moama	No	current	1863–
The Riverine Journal	Deniliquin	No	defunct	1899–1901
Riverstone Press	Riverstone	Yes	defunct	1963
The Rivertown Times	Evans Head	No	current	1985–
The Robertson Advocate	Mittagong	No	defunct	1892–1923
The Robertson Argus and Kangaloon, Mount Murray, Pheasant Ground and South Coast Chronicle	Burrawang	No	defunct	1892
The Robertson Mail	Bowral	No	defunct	1924–1930
Robina Mail	Tweed Heads South	Yes No	current	
Rock Mercury	Lockhart	No	defunct	1910–1920
The Rouse Hill-Stanhope Gardens News	Rouse Hill	Yes	defunct	2009–
Rouse Hill Times	Rouse Hill	Yes	defunct	2006–2020
The Rural	Wagga Wagga	No	current	2001–
The Rural News	Wagga Wagga	No	defunct	1990–2001
The Rural Review	Sydney	Yes	defunct	1934–1935
Rural Weekly	Northern NSW	No	defunct	2014–2020
Ryde Electorate Press	Ryde	Yes		
Rylstone Express and electoral representative	Rylstone	No	defunct	1897–1907
Rylstone Star	Rylstone	No	defunct	1903–1904

== List of newspapers in New South Wales (S) ==
Newspaper	Town / suburb	Sydney region	Status	Years of publication
Saturday advertiser	Parramatta	Yes	defunct	1978
Scone Advocate	Scone	No	defunct	1887–1982
Scone Advocate	Scone	No	defunct	1984–2020
Scoop Yass Valley	Yass	No	current	2015–
Scope	Armidale	No	defunct	1968
The Scrutineer	Moss Vale	No	defunct	1891–1892
The Scrutineer and Berrima District Press	Moss Vale	No	defunct	1892–1948
The Scrutineer and West Camden Advocate	Moss Vale	No	defunct	1874–1891
Seaboard Valley Star	Urunga	No	current	1994–
The Sentinel	Sydney	Yes	defunct	1845–1848
The Sentinel	Forest Lodge	Yes	defunct	1927–1928
The Shearer	Sydney	Yes	defunct	1904–1906
Shearer's strike bulletin	Sydney	Yes	defunct	1922
Shellharbour Advertiser	Wollongong	No	defunct	2006–2012
Shipping & Insurance Gazette and Mercantile Gazette	Sydney	Yes	defunct	1934
The Shipping Gazette and Sydney General Trade List	Sydney	Yes	defunct	1844–1860
The Shipping Guide	Sydney	Yes	defunct	1888–1892
The Shipping Magnate and Sydney General Trade List	Sydney			
The Shire Guardian: voice of the Hills district	Castle Hill	Yes	defunct	1971
Shire Pictorial	Caringbah	Yes	defunct	1959–1975
The Shire Sentinel	Engadine	Yes	defunct	1997
The Shoalhaven and Nowra News	Nowra	No	current	1946–
Shoalhaven City Advertiser	Huskisson	No	defunct	1999
Shoalhaven Independent	Nowra	No	defunct	1997–2001
Shoalhaven News	Nowra	No	defunct	1937–1945
Shoalhaven News	Shoalhaven	No	defunct	1971–1990
The Shoalhaven News and South Coast Districts Advertiser	Nowra	No	defunct	1891–1937
Shoalhaven Review	Huskisson	No	defunct	1996–1999
Shoalhaven Sun	Nowra	No	defunct	2001–2002
The Shoalhaven Telegraph	Nowra	No	defunct	1879–1937
The Silver Age	Silverton	No	defunct	1884–1893
The Silver City Age	Broken Hill	No	defunct	1976–1977
Singleton Advocate	Singleton	No	defunct	1892
Singleton Argus	Singleton	No	current	1880–
The Singleton Argus and Upper Hunter General Advocate	Singleton	No	defunct	1874–1880
Singleton Times and Patrick's Plains, Muswellbrook, Scone and Murrurundi Advertiser	Singleton	No	defunct	1861–1867
The Sino-Australasian Times newspaper	Sydney	Yes	defunct	1930
Smith's Weekly	Sydney	Yes	defunct	1919–1950
Snowy-Monaro Weekly	Cooma	No	defunct	1991–1994
The Social Democrat: an exponent of international socialism and industrial unionism: official organ of the Social Democratic league of N.S.W.	Sydney	Yes	defunct	1917–1918
South Coast and Southern Tablelands Magazine	Nowra	No	defunct	1976–1997
South Coast Express	Wollongong	No	defunct	1964–1967
The South Coast Herald	Dapto	No	defunct	1902–1905
The South Coast Herald, Albion Park, Shallharbour and Dapto Guardian	Dapto	No	defunct	1895–1898
The South Coast Herald and Dapto & Albion Park Guardian	Dapto	No	defunct	1905–1906
The South Coast and Illawarra Guardian	Albion Park	No	defunct	1898–1902
South Coast Register	Berry	No	current	1924–
South Coast Times	Wollongong	No	defunct	1959–1968
South Coast Times and Wollongong Argus	Wollongong	No	defunct	1900–1959
South East Magazine	Queanbeyan	No	current	1977–
South Sydney Advertiser	Newtown	Yes	current	1970–
South Sydney Bulletin	Strawberry Hills	Yes	defunct	1996–2000
South Sydney News	Waterloo	Yes	defunct	1992
The South Sydney Observer	Kensington	Yes	defunct	1971
South West Advertiser	Liverpool	Yes	current	2009–
South West District Star	St Marys	No	defunct	1975–1976
South West News Pictorial	Young	No	current	1869–
South Western Rural Advertiser	Liverpool	No	defunct	2005–2009
The Southern Advertiser	Surry Hills	Yes	defunct	1966
The Southern Argus	Goulburn	Yes	defunct	1882–1885
The Southern Argus	Goulburn	No	defunct	1867–1885
The Southern Argus	Goulburn	Yes	defunct	1887–1888
Southern Courier	Alexandria	Yes	current	1996–2020
The Southern Courier	Deniliquin	No	defunct	1860–1861
Southern Courier	Waterloo	Yes	defunct	1982–1989
The Southern Cross	Sydney	Yes	defunct	1859–1861
The Southern Cross	Junee	No	defunct	1884–1887
Southern Cross	Junee	No	defunct	1981–2020
Southern Daily Argus	Goulburn	No	defunct	1881
Southern Daily Argus	Goulburn	No	defunct	1885–1887
Southern Daily Argus	Goulburn	No	current	
Southern Highland News	Bowral	No	current	1961–
Southern Highlands Express	Mittagong	No	current	2020–
Southern News	Randwick	Yes	defunct	1963–1982
The Southern Mail	Mittagong	No	defunct	1887–1961
The Southern Morning Herald	Goulburn	No	defunct	1868–1923
The Southern Queen	Sydney	Yes	defunct	1845
The Southern Record and Advertiser	Candelo	No	defunct	1910–1938
Southern Riverina News	Finley	No	current	1970–
The Southern Rural	Wagga Wagga	No	defunct	1989–1990
The Southern Star (newspaper, Bega, New South Wales)	Bega	No	defunct	1900–1923
Southern Star	Moruya	No	defunct	1970–1989
Southern Star and Bay Advocate	Moruya	No	defunct	1989–1998
Southern Star	Moruya	No	defunct	1998–2002
Southern Sun	Batemans Bay	No	defunct	1985–1990
Southern Weekly Magazine	Cowra	No	defunct	1975–1990
Southern Weekly: number one in the south west and the Riverina	Cootamundra	No	current	1991–
Southern Wollongong News	Corrimal	No	defunct	1993–1996
The Spectator	Sydney	Yes	defunct	1846
The Spectator	Sydney	Yes	defunct	1892
The Spectator	Walgett	No	current	1896–
The Spectator	Wollongong	No	defunct	1922
The Spectator	Bondi Beach	Yes	current	1972–
The Sporting Times	Sydney	Yes	defunct	1848
The Sporting Times	Sydney	Yes	defunct	1929
Sportsman	Surry Hills	Yes	current	1960–
The Sportsman and licensed victuallers' gazette			defunct	1874
Springwood Sentinel	Springwood	No	defunct	1959
St George & Sutherland Shire Leader	Hurstville/Sutherland	Yes	current	1960–
The St George & Sutherland Shire Messenger	Hurstville	Yes	defunct	1997–1998
The St George & Sutherland Shire Pictorial	Caringbah	Yes	defunct	1975
The St. George Call	Kogarah	Yes	defunct	1904–1979
The St George Observer	Kogarah	Yes	defunct	1899
The St Georges Advocate	Rockdale	Yes	defunct	1899–1903
St Ives Community News	Crows Nest	Yes	defunct	1998–1999
St Ives Community News	St Ives	Yes	defunct	1991–1998
St Marys-Penrith Times	Penrith	Yes	defunct	1962–1966
St Marys Star	Parramatta	Yes	current	2000–
Stageland: the official organ and souvenir of the Australian theatrical profession	Sydney	Yes	defunct	1907–1908
The Standard	Leichhardt	Yes	defunct	1893–1904
The Standard of Freedom and Wellington Gazette	Wellington	No	defunct	1892
The Star	Sydney	Yes	defunct	1845–1846
The Star	Sydney	Yes	defunct	1982–1985
Star Advocate	Mullumbimby	No	defunct	1950–1964
The Star and working man's guardian	Parramatta	Yes	defunct	1844–1845
The Star: Chatswood and Northern	Chatswood	Yes	defunct	1977
The Star: Lake Macquarie	Lake Macquarie	No	defunct	2013–2014
The Star: Newcastle	Newcastle	No	defunct	2013–2014
The Star: Newcastle and Lake Macquarie	Charlestown	No	defunct	1998–2013; 2014–2020
The Star Observer	Darlinghurst	Yes	defunct	1985–1986
The Star: the Australian Evening Daily	Sydney	Yes	defunct	1909–1910
Stockton News	Raymond Terrace	No	defunct	1853–1954
The Stockwhip	Sydney	Yes	defunct	1875
The Sturt Recorder, Tibooburra and Mount Browne Advertiser	Milparinka	No	defunct	1893–1899
The Suburban Herald	Crows Nest	Yes	defunct	1925–1938
The Suburban Telegraph	Newtown	Yes	defunct	1878–1882
The Suburban Times and Redfern, Waterloo, Alexandria, Darlington and Botany Gazetteer	Redfern	Yes	defunct	1892–1904
The Sugar Valley Community News	West Wallsend	No	defunct	1992–1996
Summerland News pictorial	Ballina	No	current	1949–
Summerland News triangle	Ballina	No	defunct	1978
The Summit Sun	Jindabyne	No	current	1991–
The Sun	Orange	No	defunct	1899–1901
The Sun	Sydney	Yes	defunct	1910–1988
The Sun and guardian	Sydney	Yes	defunct	1931–1953
The Sun: and New South Wales Independent Press	Sydney	Yes	defunct	1843
The Sun-Guardian	Blacktown	Yes	current	2008–
The Sun-Herald	Sydney	Yes	current	1953–
Sun Holroyd	Parramatta	Yes	current	2010–
The Sun	Parramatta	Yes	current	2010–
The Sun Weekly	Gosford	No	defunct	1992–2001
Sunday	Sydney	Yes	defunct	1977–1979
Sunday	Dubbo	No	defunct	1997–1998
Sunday Advertiser: covering Sydney's westside	Parramatta	Yes	defunct	1975–1976
Sunday Argus	Parramatta	Yes	defunct	1977–1978
Sunday Extra	Parramatta	Yes	defunct	1977–1978
The Sunday Guardian	Sydney	Yes	defunct	1929–1931
The Sunday Herald	Sydney	Yes	defunct	1949–1953
Sunday Life	Sydney	Yes	current	1997–
Sunday Mirror	Sydney	Yes	defunct	1958–1977
Sunday News	Sydney	Yes	defunct	1919–1930
Sunday News	Sydney	Yes	defunct	1967
The Sunday Observer	Sydney	Yes	defunct	1933
The Sunday Pictorial	Sydney	Yes	defunct	1929–1930
Sunday Pictorial: covering Sydney's southern regions	Parramatta	Yes	defunct	1975–1976
Sunday Star: covering Sydney's eastside	Parramatta	Yes	defunct	1975–1976
The Sunday Sun	Sydney	Yes	defunct	1903–1910
The Sunday Telegraph	Sydney	Yes	current	1879–
Sunday Times	Sydney	Yes	defunct	1885–1930
Sunday Times: covering Sydney's northern regions	Parramatta	Yes	defunct	1975–1976
Sunday World	Sydney	Yes	defunct	1979
The Sunny corner, silver press and miners' advocate	Mitchell	No	defunct	1885–1886
Sunny South	Sydney	Yes	defunct	1901
The Surry Cosmopolitan	Darlinghurst	Yes	defunct	1985
Sutherland-Menai Express	Bankstown	Yes	defunct	1997–1999
Sutherland Shire Pictorial	Parramatta	Yes	defunct	1976–1978
Sydney Bulletin	Sydney	Yes	defunct	1880–2008
Sydney Central Courier	Sydney	Yes	defunct	2005–2006
The Sydney Chronicle	Sydney	Yes	defunct	1846–1848
Sydney City Extra	North Sydney	Yes	defunct	1992
Sydney City Hub	Broadway	Yes	defunct	1995–2001
The Sydney Daily Advertiser	Sydney	Yes	defunct	1948
Sydney Dispatch	Sydney	Yes	defunct	1858
The Sydney Evening Mail	Sydney	Yes	defunct	1859
Sydney Free Press	Sydney	Yes	defunct	1841–1842
The Sydney Gazette and New South Wales Advertiser	Sydney	Yes	defunct	1803–1842
Sydney General Trade List	Sydney	Yes	defunct	1828–1829
Sydney General Trade List	Sydney	Yes	defunct	1834–1842
Sydney General Trade List, and Mercantile Advertiser	Sydney	Yes	defunct	1829–1930
Sydney General Trade List, Mercantile Chronicle and Advertiser	Sydney	Yes	defunct	1830
The Sydney Herald	Sydney	Yes	defunct	1831–1842
The Sydney Jewish News	Sydney	Yes	defunct	1939–1973
Sydney Journal and Daily Advertiser	Sydney	Yes	defunct	1847
The Sydney Local	Sydney	Yes	defunct	1987
Sydney Mail	Sydney	Yes	defunct	1860–1871
Sydney Mail	Sydney	Yes	defunct	1912–1938
The Sydney Mail and New South Wales Advertiser	Sydney	Yes	defunct	1871–1912
The Sydney Mercantile Advertiser	Sydney	Yes	defunct	1870
Sydney Midweek News	Sydney	Yes	defunct	1988
The Sydney Monitor	Sydney	Yes	defunct	1828–1838
The Sydney Monitor and Commercial Advertiser	Sydney	Yes	defunct	1838–1841
The Sydney Morning Herald	Sydney	Yes	current	1842–
The Sydney Morning Herald, Daily Telegraph and Daily News, The Sun, Daily Mirror	Sydney	Yes	defunct	1944–1955
The Sydney News	Sydney	Yes	defunct	1850
Sydney News	West Chatswood	Yes	defunct	1993–1995
Sydney Observer Magazine	Killara	Yes	current	2003–
Sydney Pickwick, Sporting Chronicle and Police Gazette	Sydney	Yes	defunct	1849
Sydney Punch	Sydney	Yes	defunct	1864
The Sydney Review	Sydney	Yes	defunct	1988–1996
Sydney Shout	Sydney	Yes	defunct	1978–1981
The Sydney Sporting Life	Sydney	Yes	defunct	1866–1867
Sydney Sportsman	Sydney	Yes	defunct	1900–1960
The Sydney Standard	Sydney	Yes		
The Sydney Standard and colonial advocate	Sydney	Yes	defunct	1839
The Sydney Star	Sydney	Yes	defunct	1979–1982
Sydney Star Observer	Sydney	Yes	current	1987–
The Sydney Stock and Station Journal	Sydney	Yes	defunct	1888–1924
Sydney Times	Sydney	Yes	defunct	1958–1959
Sydney Times	Darlinghurst	Yes	defunct	1985
Sydney Times: a journal for the promotion of Australian literature and the advocacy of encouragement to native industry	Sydney	Yes	defunct	1864
Sydney Town Anchor	Sydney	Yes	defunct	1978
The Sydney Tribune	Sydney	Yes	defunct	1994
Sydney Undercover	Annandale	Yes	defunct	1994
The Sydney Weekly Transcript	Sydney	Yes	defunct	1846
The Sydney Wool and Produce Journal	Sydney	Yes	defunct	1890–1897
The Sydney Wool and Stock journal	Sydney	Yes	defunct	1890–1897
Sydney's Star Observer	Darlinghurst	Yes	defunct	1986–1987
Sydney's Village Voice	Darlinghurst	Yes	defunct	1985–1986
Sydney's Village Voice	Darlinghurst	Yes	defunct	1987–1988

== List of newspapers in New South Wales (T–V) ==
Newspaper	Town / suburb	Sydney region	Status	Years of publication
Table talk	Albury	No	defunct	1893–1895
Tablelands District Times	Bankstown	Yes	defunct	1996–1998
The Entrance Guardian	The Entrance	No	defunct	1934–1990?
The Tablelands Post	Millthorpe	No	defunct	1995–2002
The Tablelands Times	Armidale	No	defunct	1975–1980
The Tablelands Times	Armidale	No	defunct	1980–1985
Tallaganda Times	Braidwood	No	defunct	1972–2005
The Tamworth Advertiser	Tamworth	No	defunct	1967–1969
The Tamworth and District Independent	Tamworth	No	defunct	2000
Tamworth City News	Tamworth	No	current	2007–
The Tamworth City News	Tamworth	No	defunct	1990–2000
Tamworth Daily Observer	Tamworth	No	defunct	1910–1916
Tamworth Examiner and General Advertiser for the Northern Districts of New South Wales	Tamworth	No	defunct	1859–1866
The Tamworth News and Liverpool Plains and Gwydir Districts' Advertiser	Tamworth	No	defunct	1872–1910
The Tamworth Observer and Northern Advertiser	Tamworth	No	defunct	1876–1910
The Tamworth Times	Tamworth	No	defunct	1981–1989
The Tamworth Times	Tamworth	No	current	2000–
Taralga Echo	Crookwell	No	defunct	1924–1927
The Teetotaller and general newspaper	Sydney	Yes	defunct	1842–1843
Telegraph and Shoalhaven Advertiser	Nowra	No	defunct	1879–1881
Telegraph Pictorial	Sydney	Yes	defunct	1857–1958
The Telegraph rotogravure pictorial supplement	Sydney	Yes	defunct	1934
The Temora Advertiser	Temora	No	current	1939–
The Temora Advocate	Temora	No	defunct	1891
Temora Herald and Mining Journal	Temora	No	defunct	1882–1883
The Temora Independent	Temora	No	current	1892–
The Temora Star	Temora	No	defunct	1880–1935
The Temora Telegraph and Mining Advocate	Temora	No	defunct	1880
Temperance Advocate and Australasian Commercial and Agricultural Intelligencer	Sydney	Yes	defunct	1840–1841
The Tenterfield Argus and New England Gazette	Tenterfield	No	defunct	1883–1884
The Tenterfield Chronicle and Northern Mining Journal	Tenterfield	No	defunct	1863
Tenterfield Courier and District Advocate	Tenterfield	No	defunct	1914
Tenterfield Independent and New England Gazette	Tenterfield	No	defunct	1875–1881
The Tenterfield Intercolonial Courier and Fairfield and Wallangarra Advocate	Tenterfield	No	defunct	1891–1914
The Tenterfield News and Farmers and Graziers Advocate	Tenterfield	No	defunct	1924–1925
The Tenterfield Record and Border Advertiser	Tenterfield	No	defunct	1885–1890
The Tenterfield Star	Tenterfield	No	current	1892–
The Tenterfield Star and New England Chronicle	Tenterfield	No	defunct	1875–1892
The Terrigal Times	The Entrance	No	defunct	1987–1996
Thai Media	West Ryde	Yes	current	1999–
Tharunka	Kensington	Yes	current	1953–
Thredbo News	Sydney	No	current	1949–
Tiger	Five Dock	Yes	defunct	1973–1975
Tilba Times and South Dampier Miner	Moruya	No	defunct	1898–1902
The Times	Sydney	Yes	defunct	1934–1949
The Times	Sussex Inlet	No	defunct	1988–2006
The Times-Leader	Temora	No	defunct	1967–1973
Times on Sunday	Broadway	Yes	defunct	1986–1988
Tingha Advocate and North-Western Journal	Tingha	No	defunct	1914–1932
The Tingha Miner and North-Western Advocate	Tingha	No	defunct	1905–1908
The Tocumwal Guardian and Finley Free Press	Tocumwal	No	defunct	1908–1913
Tocumwal Guardian and Riverina Echo	Tocumwal	No	defunct	1913–1918
Tocumwal Guardian and Riverina Stock Journal	Tocumwal	No	defunct	1918–1970
The Toiler: organ of the industrial movement	Newcastle	No	defunct	1920–1921
Top-notch	Chatswood	Yes	defunct	1916–1924
Top weekly	Campsie	Yes	current	1996–
Torch	Bankstown	Yes	defunct	1950–1964
Town and country magazine	Goulburn	No	current	1985–
Town and country magazine	Maitland	No	current	1985–
The Town crier of Sydney town	Sydney	Yes	defunct	1970
Trades & labour advocate, or, Tribune of the People	Sydney	Yes	defunct	1889
The Trangie Advocate and Narromine and Dandaloo Advertiser	Trangie	No	defunct	1905–1907
The Trangie Times and Dandaloo Advertiser	Trangie	No	defunct	1902–1907
Tribune	Sydney	Yes	defunct	1939–1991
Tribune and news of the week	Sydney	Yes	defunct	1882–1889
Tribune International	Sydney	Yes	current	1999–
The Trundle Star	Trundle	No	defunct	1926–1959
The Trundle Star	Trundle	No	current	2012–
Trundle Times: Bogan Gate, Tullamore, Tottenham and Fifield Chronicle	Trundle	No	defunct	1908–1941
The Trundle-Tullamore Star	Condobolin	No	defunct	1959–1980
The Truth	Sydney	Yes	defunct	1879–1880
Truth	Sydney	Yes	defunct	1890–1958
Tuggarah Lakes Advocate	Gorokan	No	defunct	1975–1982
The Tuggerah Lakes News	The Entrance	No	defunct	1987–1994
Tumbarumba	Tumbarumba	No	defunct	1907–1968
Tumbarumba Times	Tumbarumba	No	current	1904–
The Tumut Advocate and Farmers and Settlers Adviser	Adelong	No	defunct	1903–1925
The Tumut and Adelong Times	Tumut	No	defunct	1864–1949
The Tumut and Adelong Times and the Batlow District News	Tumut	No	current	1949–
Tumut-Batlow-Adelong District News	Tumut	No	defunct	1932–1942
Tweed and Brunswick Advocate	Murwillumbah	No	defunct	1903–1905
Tweed and Brunswick Advocate and Southern Queensland record	Murwillumbah	No	defunct	1892–1903
Tweed and Gold Coast Daily News	Murwillumbah	No	defunct	1986–1989
Tweed and South Coast Daily	Murwillumbah	No	defunct	1849–1957
The Tweed Daily	Murwillumbah	No	defunct	1914–1949
Tweed Daily News	Murwillumbah	No	defunct	2007–2011
Tweed Daily News	Murwillumbah	No	defunct	1989–1993
Tweed Daily News	Tweed Heads	No	defunct	2014–2020
The Tweed Guardian	Murwillumbah	No	defunct	1918
Tweed Herald and Brunswick Chronicle	Murwillumbah	No	defunct	1894–1913
Tweed Mail	Tweed Heads	No	defunct	2004–2006
The Tweed Shire Echo	Murwillumbah	No	defunct	2008–2012
Tweed Times	Murwillumbah	No	defunct	2001–2004
Tweed Times and Brunswick Advocate	Murwillumbah	No	defunct	1905–1913
The 2120 and beyond : monthly community news	Thornleigh	Yes	defunct	1989–1994
Twin Cities	Albury	No	defunct	1979–2001
Twin Town Times	Harden	No	current	2014–
Twofold Bay and Maneroo Observer	Twofold Bay	No	defunct	1860–1899
The Twofold Bay and Maneroo Telegraph	Twofold Bay	No	defunct	1860
The Twofold Bay Magnet and South Coast and Southern Monaro Advertiser	Eden	No	defunct	1908–1919
The Twofold Bay Telegraph	Eden	No	defunct	1860
TWT: the weekly times	Ryde	Yes	current	1960–
The Ulladulla and Milton Times	Ulladulla	No	defunct	1878–1969
The Unionist and Gulgong advertiser	Gulgong	No	defunct	1892
Upper Hunter Courier	Murrurundi	No	defunct	1871
The Upper Hunter Standard	Muswellbrook	No	defunct	1888
Upper Mountains News	Katoomba	No	defunct	1968–1969
The Uralla and Walcha Times	Uralla	No	defunct	1876–1895
The Uralla News	Uralla	No	defunct	1904–1915?
Uralla Times	Armidale	No	defunct	1914–1975
The Uralla Times	Armidale	No	defunct	1980–1983
The Uralla Times and People's Advocate	Uralla	No	defunct	1895–1904
The Uralla Times and District Advocate	Uralla	No	defunct	1904–1914
The Urana Independent and Clear Hills Standard	Urana	No	defunct	1913–1921
Urana Shire Advocate	Urana	No	defunct	1920–1950
The Valley Advertiser	Port Macquarie	No	defunct	1971–1977
The Valley Advocate	Muswellbrook	No	defunct	1982–1984
The Valley Plaza Voice	Liverpool	Yes	defunct	1996–1997
The Village Observer	Lane Cove	Yes	current	1993
The Village Paper	Paddington	Yes	defunct	1981
Village Voice	Balmain	Yes	current	
The Village Voice Australia	Surry Hills	Yes	defunct	1988–1990
The Voice	Bankstown	Yes	defunct	1984–1990
The Voice	Eden	No	defunct	1969–1971
Voice Australia	Sydney	Yes	current	1990–
The Voice of the North	Newcastle	No	defunct	1910–1933
The Voice News Weekly	Miranda	Yes	current	1978–
Vision China Times	Sydney	Yes	current	2001–

== List of newspapers in New South Wales (W–Z) ==
Newspaper	Town / suburb	Sydney region	Status	Years of publication
The Wagga Wagga Advertiser	Wagga Wagga	No	defunct	1874–1905
Wagga Wagga Advertiser and Riverine Reporter	Wagga Wagga	No	defunct	1868–1875
The Wagga Evening Post	Wagga Wagga	No	defunct	
The Wagga Wagga Advertiser	Wagga Wagga	No	defunct	1875–1910
The Wagga Wagga Advertiser and Riverine Reporter	Wagga Wagga	No	defunct	1868–1875
Wagga Wagga Express	Wagga Wagga	No	defunct	1875–1919
Wagga Wagga Express	Wagga Wagga	No	defunct	1930–1939
Wagga Wagga Express and Murrumbidgee District Advertiser	Wagga Wagga	No	defunct	1858–1875
Wagga Wagga Progress Weekly	Wagga Wagga	No	defunct	1969
The Walcha News	Walcha	No	defunct	1932–2020
The Walcha News and Southern New England Advocate	Walcha	No	defunct	1904–1932
The Walcha Witness and Vernon County Record	Balgowlah	No	defunct	1895–1906
The Walgett News and North-Western Grazier	Walgett	No	defunct	1883–1901
The Walla Walla Times and Brocklesby, Walbundrie, Burrumbuttock and Balldale News	Walla Walla	No	defunct	1925–1931
The Wallsend and Plattsburg Sun	Wallsend	No	defunct	1886–1896
Gwydir News (formerly The Warialda Standard and Northern Districts' Advertiser)	Warialda	No	current	1894–
The Warialda Watchman	Warialda	No	defunct	1899
The Warren Advocate	Warren	No	defunct	1953–1972
The Warren Advocate	Warren	No	defunct	1979–2011
Warren Herald, Lower Macquarie and Nevertire Advocate	Warren	No	defunct	1890–1900
Warren Weekly	Warren	No	current	1985–
The Warringah Express	Mosman	Yes	defunct	1902
Warringah Pittwater News	Newport Beach	Yes	defunct	1968–1973
Watchman	Sydney	Yes	defunct	1902–1926
Wauchope Gazette	Wauchope	No	defunct	2006–2020
The Waverley Advertiser	Woollahra	Yes	defunct	1894–1896
Waverley Review	Bondi	Yes	defunct	1971
Wee Waa Echo	Wee Waa	No	defunct	1972–1975
The Wee Waa Herald	Wee Waa	No	defunct	1929–1937
The Wee Waa News	Narrabri	No	current	1991–
The Weekly	Mudgee	No	current	2004–
The Weekly Advance	Granville	Yes	defunct	1892–1894
The Weekly Advocate	Balgowlah	No	defunct	1877–1891
The Weekly Courier	Randwick	Yes	defunct	1959–1977
Weekly Dispatch	Sydney	Yes	defunct	1847
The Weekly Flash	Canterbury	Yes	defunct	1953–1971
The Weekly Gazette	Earlwood	Yes	defunct	1946
Weekly Mirror	Sydney	Yes	defunct	1961–1962
Weekly News Pictorial	Newport Beach	Yes	defunct	1958–1960
Weekly News, Sporting and Dramatic Budget	Sydney	Yes	defunct	1895
Weekly Observer	Sydney	Yes	defunct	1832–1833
The Weekly Review	Newtown	Yes	defunct	1899–1900
The Weekly Southern Courier	Alexandria	Yes	defunct	1989–1996
The Weekly Star	Canterbury	Yes	defunct	1951
Weekly Supplement to Building	Sydney	Yes	defunct	1908–1909
Weekly Times	Lismore	No	defunct	1924–1925
The Weekly Times	Ryde	Yes	current	1921–
The Week's News	Sydney	Yes	defunct	1910–1911
The Wellington Gazette and Western Districts Advertiser	Wellington	No	defunct	1874–1907
The Wellington Times	Wellington	No	defunct	1899–2020
The Wellington Times and Australian Industrial Liberator	Wellington	No	defunct	1892–1899
Werriwa Times and Goulburn District News	Werriwa	No	defunct	1901
The Wentworth Advocate	Wentworth	No	defunct	1888
Wentworth Courier	Randwick	Yes	current	1961–
Wentworth Courier	Bondi Junction	Yes	current	1947–
Wentworth Courier Central	Sydney	Yes	defunct	2003–2004
Wentworth News	Rose Bay	Yes	defunct	1957–1960
The Wentworth Telegraph and Murray and Darling News	Wentworth	No	defunct	1878–1885
The Werriwa Times and Goulburn District News	Goulburn	No	defunct	1901
West Macquarie	Blayney	No	defunct	1897–1929
West Pymble Gazette	Pymble	Yes	defunct	1957–1969
The West Wyalong Advocate	West Wyalong	No	current	1928–
Western Advocate	Orange	No	defunct	1874–1904
The Western Advocate	Bathurst	No	current	1963–
Western Age	Dubbo	No	defunct	1899–1932
Western Age	Dubbo	No	defunct	1933–1963
Western Champion	Parkes	No	defunct	1893–1934
Western Daily Advocate	Orange	No	defunct	1904–1907
Western Districts Independent	Liverpool	Yes	defunct	1989
Western Examiner and Orange, Molong, Wellington, Dubbo and Lachlan Advertiser	Orange	No	defunct	1861–1875
Western Express	Rylstone	Yes	defunct	1907
The Western Free Press	Broken Hill	No	defunct	1899
The Western Grazier	Wilcannia	No	defunct	1880–1951
The Western Herald	Bourke	No	current	1887–
Western Life	White Cliffs	No	defunct	1897–1903
Western Magazine	Dubbo	No	current	1973–
Western Mail	Dubbo	No	defunct	1972–1991
The Western People and Nyngan Advocate	Nyngan	No	defunct	1891–1892
The Western Post	Newcastle	No	defunct	1994–1995
The Western Post and People's Representative	Mudgee	No	defunct	1860–1910
Western Press	Smithfield	Yes	defunct	1970–1972
The Western Standard	Parramatta	Yes	defunct	1973–1980
Western Star	Narromine	No	defunct	1984–2001
Western Stock and Station Journal	Orange	No	defunct	1946–1957
The Western Suburbs Courier	Alexandria	Yes	defunct	1884–1993
Western Suburbs Weekly Budget	Leichhardt	Yes	defunct	1886–1903
The Western Sun	Forbes	No	defunct	1928–1936
Western Sunday	Dubbo	No	defunct	1964–1997
The Western Times	Bathurst	No	defunct	1936–1963
Western Times	Bathurst	No	current	1981–
Western Weekender Blacktown City Guardian	Blacktown	Yes	defunct	2001–2007
Western Weekender	Penrith	Yes	current	1991–
Western Weekender – Hawkesbury	Penrith	Yes	defunct	2008–2009
The Westgate Weekly News	Leichhardt	Yes	defunct	1958–1976
The Westlake Courier	Morisset	No	defunct	1987–1994
Westside Friday Extra	Parramatta	Yes	defunct	1984–195
The Whisper	Darlinghurst	Yes	current	1991–
The Wilcannia News	Wilcannia	Yes	current	2003–
The Wilcannia Times	Wilcannia	No	defunct	1874–1888
Will o' the wisp	Sydney	Yes	defunct	1846
Windsor and Richmond Gazette	Windsor	Yes	defunct	1888–1983
Windsor Express and Richmond Advertiser	Windsor	Yes	defunct	1843–1844
Wingecarribee highlands post	Goulburn	No	defunct	1982–1984
Wingecarribee Post	Moss Vale	No	defunct	1981–1982
The Wingham Chronicle	Wingham	No	defunct	1989–2020
The Wingham Chronicle and Manning River Observer	Wingham	No	defunct	1880–1965
The Wingham Chronicle and Manning River Observer	Wingham	No	defunct	1969–1982
The Witness	Sydney	Yes	defunct	1877–1902
The Witness and Australian Presbyterian	Sydney	Yes	defunct	1874–1877
Wollondilly Advertiser	Picton	No	defunct	2003–2020
Wollondilly Crier	Buxton	No	defunct	1973
The Wollondilly Press	Bowral	No	defunct	1906–1914
Wollondilly Times	Buxton	No	defunct	1989
Wollongong Advertiser	Wollongong	No	defunct	1982–2015
Wollongong and Northern Leader	Corrimal	No	defunct	2007–2011
The Wollongong Argus	Wollongong	No	defunct	1876–1899
Wollongong City Trader	Wollongong	No	defunct	1990–1992
Wollongong News and Shopper Guide	Wollongong	No	defunct	1978
Wollongong-South Coast Express	Parramatta	No	current	1975–
Woollahra Voice	Surry Hills	Yes	current	1974–
Woolloomooloo Rag	Kings Cross	Yes	defunct	1979–1987
Woolloomooloo Review	Woolloomooloo	Yes	defunct	1989–2000
The Worker	Wagga Wagga, then Sydney	No	defunct	1892–1913
The Workers' Weekly	Sydney	Yes	defunct	1923–1939
The World	Sydney	Yes	defunct	1931–1932
The World's News	Sydney	Yes	defunct	1901–1955
The Woy Woy and Ocean Beach Chronicle	Woy Woy	No	defunct	1918–1923
Woy Woy District Leader	Woy Woy	No	defunct	1966
The Woy Woy Herald	Gosford	No	defunct	1922–1974
The Wyalong Advocate and Mining, Agricultural and Pastoral Gazette	West Wyalong	No	defunct	1900–1928
The Wyalong Argus	Wyalong	No	defunct	1897–1900
The Wyalong Star and Temora and Barmedman Advertiser	West Wyalong	No	defunct	1894–1930
Wyndham Observer	Wyndham	No	current	1979–
The Wynyard Times	Tumut	No	defunct	1860–1864
Wyong and Lakes Districts Advocate	Wyong	No	defunct	1921–1973
Wyong and Lakes Districts Advocate	Wyong	No	defunct	1973–1974
Wyong Regional Chronicle	Wyong	No	current	2012–
Wyong Shire Advocate	West Gosford	No	current	1987–
Wyong Shire Sun Weekly	Gosford	No	defunct	2006–2008
Wyong-Toukley Advocate	Wyong	No	defunct	1973
Wyong-Toukley-Entrance Advocate	Gorokan	No	defunct	1974–1975
The Yass Courier	Yass	No	defunct	1854–1929
Yass Evening Tribune	Yass	No	defunct	1879–1929
Yass Post	Yass	No	defunct	1978–
Yass Tribune	Yass	No	current	1955–
Yass Tribune-Courier	Yass	No	defunct	1929–1955
Young Australia	Sydney	Yes	defunct	1937–1938
The Young Chronicle	Young	No	defunct	1902–1947
The Young Times	Young	No	defunct	1985–1993
Young Witness	Young	No	defunct	1913–1923
Young Witness	Young	No	defunct	1931–1961
Young Witness	Young	No	current	1993–
Your Local Independent	Port Macquarie	No	current	2009–
Your Local News	Caringbah	Yes	defunct	1995–1996

== See also ==
- List of newspapers in Australia
- List of student newspapers in Australia
- Media of Australia
- Media in Sydney
