= List of newspapers in South Australia by circulation =

This list includes newspaper currently printed and circulating in South Australia. Circulation data has been sourced from the Audited Media Association of Australia in May 2016 (unless otherwise cited). Many of these newspapers are printed weekly or twice weekly.

Newspaper	Town/region	Circulation	Digital subscribers	Retail price	Owner
Sunday Mail	Adelaide, Statewide	202,567		$2.70	Advertiser Newspapers Ltd (a Newscorp subsidiary)
The Advertiser (Monday-Saturday)	Adelaide, Statewide	132,068		$1.40	Advertiser Newspapers Ltd (a Newscorp subsidiary)
Northern Messenger		86,669		$0.00	Messenger Newspapers Pty Ltd (a Newscorp subsidiary)
Weekly Times Messenger		65,812		$0.00	Messenger Newspapers Pty Ltd (a Newscorp subsidiary)
Guardian Messenger	Adelaide Metropolitan	68,540		$0.00	Messenger Newspapers Pty Ltd (a Newscorp subsidiary)
Southern Times Messenger		65,220		$0.00	Messenger Newspapers Pty Ltd (a Newscorp subsidiary)
Eastern Courier Messenger	Adelaide Metropolitan	48,001		$0.00	Messenger Newspapers Pty Ltd (a Newscorp subsidiary)
Leader Messenger	Adelaide Metropolitan	41,679		$0.00	Messenger Newspapers Pty Ltd (a Newscorp subsidiary)
City North Messenger	Adelaide Metropolitan	36,864		$0.00	Messenger Newspapers Pty Ltd (a Newscorp subsidiary)
Portside Messenger	Port Adelaide	32,050		$0.00	Messenger Newspapers Pty Ltd (a Newscorp subsidiary)
East Torrens Messenger	Adelaide Metropolitan	30,648		$0.00	Messenger Newspapers Pty Ltd (a Newscorp subsidiary)
Mitcham & Hills Messenger	Adelaide Metropolitan	27,182		$0.00	Messenger Newspapers Pty Ltd (a Newscorp subsidiary)
City, The	Adelaide Metropolitan	23,614		$0.00	Messenger Newspapers Pty Ltd (a Newscorp subsidiary)
Barossa & Light Herald	Barossa Valley, Tanunda, Nuriootpa, Angaston and Lyndoch, Gawler, Kapunda, Eudunda, Mount Pleasant, Kersbrook, Williamstown, Roseworthy, Hamley Bridge, Riverton	20,174		$0.00	Barossa News Pty Ltd
Adelaide Hills Herald	Adelaide hills region	15,000		$0.00	
Adelaide East Herald	council areas of Mitcham, Burnside, Unley and Campbelltown	15,000		$0.00	
Flinders News, The	Port Pirie, Mid North, northern Yorke Peninsula, Far North	12,526		$0.00	Northern Argus
Courier, The	Mount Barker, Adelaide Hills	12,000		$1.30	
Stock Journal	Statewide	10,721	0	$3.60	Fairfax Regional Media
Bunyip, The	Gawler	8,750		$1.50	Murray Pioneer group
Leader, The	Barossa Valley	8,030		$1.40	
Yorke Peninsula Country Times	Yorke Peninsula	7,700		$1.50	Yorke Peninsula Country Times
Times, The	Victor Harbor	5,804	51	$1.70	Fairfax Regional Media
The Border Watch	Mount Gambier	5,803	115	$1.20	Border Watch Pty Ltd
Murray Pioneer, The	Renmark, Riverland, Northern Mallee	5,550		$1.40	Murray Pioneer group
Port Lincoln Times	Port Lincoln	4,639	153	$1.70	Fairfax Regional Media
Northern Argus	Balaklava, Burra, Clare, Jamestown, Peterborough, Riverton	3,814		$1.50	
Transcontinental, The	Port Augusta, Quorn, Flinders Ranges	3,295		$1.50	Fairfax Regional Media
Monitor, The	Roxby Downs, Olympic Dam, Andamooka, Woomera	3,000		$0.00	The Monitor
Recorder, The	Port Pirie	2,817	26	$1.70	Fairfax Regional Media
Southern Argus, The	Strathalbyn, Alexandrina, Victor Harbor, Mount Barker, Murray Bridge, Onkaparinga, Yankalilla	2,800		$1.00	
Murray Valley Standard, The	Murray Bridge	2,752	47	$1.70	Fairfax Regional Media
Whyalla News	Whyalla	2,559	52	$1.70	Fairfax Regional Media
Naracoorte Herald, The	Naracoorte	2,433	39	$1.70	SA Regional Media t/a Naracoorte Herald Pty Ltd
South Eastern Times, The	Millicent, Tantanoola, Beachport, Robe	2,300		$1.10	
Loxton News, The	Loxton	2,300		$1.50	Murray Pioneer group
Plains Producer, The	Balaklava	2,300		$1.50	
River News, The	Waikerie	2,250		$1.40	Murray Pioneer group
West Coast Sentinel	Ceduna, Streaky Bay, Elliston, Wudinna	2,024		$1.50	
Border Chronicle	Bordertown	1,480	15	$1.70	SA Regional Media t/a Naracoorte Herald Pty Ltd
Islander, The	Kangaroo Island	1,484	65	$1.70	Fairfax Regional Media
Eyre Peninsula Tribune	Cleve, Kimba, Lock, Arno Bay, Cowell, Port Neill	1,293	47	$1.70	Fairfax Regional Media
Pennant, The	Penola, Coonawarra	1,000		$1.10	
Coastal Leader	Kingston, Robe and Coorong	953	0	$1.70	SA Regional Media t/a Coastal Leader Pty Ltd
