= Star News Group =

Australian media company

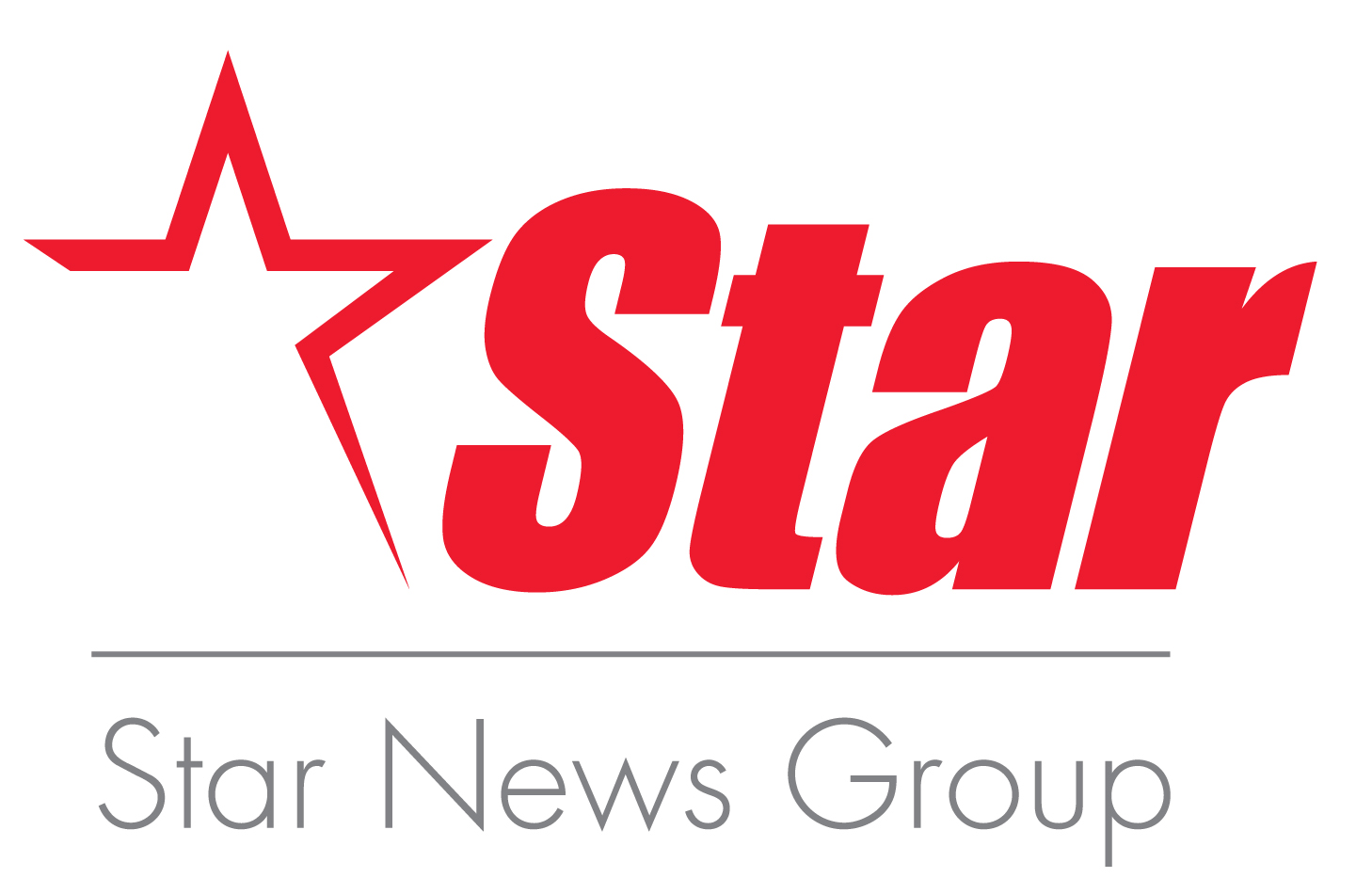
Star News Group logo

Star News Group is a media company based in Pakenham, Victoria, in Australia. Star publishes many community newspapers in the Melbourne area and other parts of Victoria. It also has publications in Queensland and South Australia. Star also publishes a number of parenting magazines under the masthead Kids Today.

Star operates Network Classifieds Pty Ltd, a contact centre in Pakenham that provides classified advertising and display advertising services for print and online. Star is also a founder and partner of the Today News Group with operations in Queensland and South Australia.

== History ==
Star News Group was founded by Albert Edward Thomas in 1909 as the Berwick Shire News and Pakenham and Cranbourne Gazette. Star News is still owned by the Thomas family and the company is managed by Paul Thomas, a fourth-generation family member. The company changed its name from South East Newspapers to Star News Group in August 2005 to reflect the growth of the company and the diversity of regions that the company covers. In December 2022, it agreed terms to purchase 14 publications from Australian Community Media.

== Publications ==
Star News Group's 80 or so community newspapers have a combined circulation of more than 500,000 copies per week. In addition, Star produces a number of niche education, wedding, tourism, real estate, kids, seniors and lifestyle magazine titles.

=== Children's ===
Kids Today magazines include: Bayside Glen Eira Kids Today, Casey Cardinia Kids Today, Stonnington Boroondara Kids Today, Geelong Coast Kids Today, Sunshine Coast Kids Today, Knox Monash Kids Today, and Yarra Ranges Kids Today. Education titles include Victoria School Guides.

=== Northern Territory ===
In the NT, the company publishes The Centralian Today and Tennant Creek Today.

=== Queensland ===
Star publishes 20 titles here including Warwick Today, Stanthorpe Today and, in Noosa, Noosa Today. The company is also involved in publishing CQ Today, Gladstone Today, Bundaberg Today, Gympie Today, South Burnett Today, Central & North Burnett Today, Maranoa Today, Ipswich News Today, Longreach Leader, and Central West Leader.

=== South Australia ===
Star publishes 17 titles in SA, including Border Watch, South Eastern Times, and Penola Pennant on the Limestone Coast in South Australia. These publications all closed in August 2020 during the COVID19 pandemic. Border Watch was relaunched in November 2020 and the other two in March 2022. Another newspaper, Barossa and Light Herald, was not relaunched after shuttering, however.

As of 2025, it also manages several other regional SA newspapers: Border Chronicle, Bunyip, Coastal Leader, Eyre Peninsula Advocate, Fleurieu Sun, Plains Producer, Port Lincoln Times, The Islander, The Murray Valley Standard, The Naracoorte Herald (Limestone Coast Today), The Recorder, South Eastern Times, The Times, The Transcontinental, Two Wells & Districts Echo, and Whyalla News.

=== Victoria ===
Star’s main holdings are in Victoria where it currently manages 34 titles. In Melbourne's South East, the company produce the following newspaper titles; Pakenham Gazette, Berwick Gazette, Pakenham Officer Star News, Berwick Star News, Cranbourne Star News, Dandenong Star Journal, Endeavour Hills Hallam Doveton Star Journal and online provide Star Community. Star also owns and operates Star Weekly titles in Melbourne's West as MMP Star Pty Ltd and they include; Brimbank & Northwest Star Weekly, Maribyrnong & Hobsons Bay Star Weekly, Melton & Moorabool Star Weekly, Northern Star Weekly, Sunbury & Macedon, Ranges Star Weekly, and Wyndham Star Weekly.

In Healesville, in the Yarra Valley and the Dandenong Ranges of Victoria, Star publishes the Ferntree Gully Belgrave Star Mail, Mount Evelyn Star Mail, Mountain Views Star Mail, Ranges Trader Star Mail, Upper Yarra Star Mail as well as the region's web site Star Mail Community.

In the Greater Geelong region, Star produces newspapers the Geelong Independent and Ocean Grove Voice as well as Geelong Coast Magazine.
