= The Whyalla News =

- Type: Weekly newspaper
- Owner: Australian Community Media
- Founder: Jock Willson
- Founded: 1940
- Language: English
- City: Whyalla, South Australia
- Website: whyallanewsonline.com.au

The Whyalla News is a newspaper serving the town of Whyalla on Eyre Peninsula, South Australia since 1940. It was later sold to Rural Press, previously owned by Fairfax Media, but now an Australian media company trading as Australian Community Media.

== History ==
The Whyalla News was first published on 5 April 1940 by Jock Willson and trading as Northern Newspapers. In 1950, the newspaper's editor was J. E. Edwards. As of January 2015, the newspaper's editor is Eli Gould. Gould was preceded by Kate Bilney. In November 1960, the Whyalla News became a biweekly newspaper, before it became a triweekly in October 1968. The newspaper chronicled the development of the town from its infancy as a BHP company town through the establishment of the Whyalla steelworks, autonomous local government in 1970, and the closure of the shipyard in 1978.

Other Northern Newspapers holdings included the Transcontinental, the Spencer Gulf Pictorial (1970-1992), the Recorder, the Flinders News, Eyre Peninsula Tribune, the Barossa Herald, and the Times, as well as a printing company. In 1991, it was sold to Rural Press, which merged with Fairfax Media in 2006–2007.

== Distribution ==
Today, its reportage includes any news relevant to the people of Whyalla and neighbouring towns of Cowell, Kimba and Iron Knob. During the half-year ending December 2015, average circulation was 2,559. Like other Rural Press publications, the newspaper is also available online.
