= Samuel W. Osborne =

Samuel Watts Osborne (1868 – 7 March 1952) was founder and editor of the Advertiser of Port Pirie, South Australia, brother of Robert M. Osborne, founder of the Petersburg Times.

== History ==
Samuel was born at Uley, Gloucestershire, the younger son of Rev. Robert Ivey Osborne, and was educated at a boarding school. He began his journalistic career with the Dursley Gazette of Gloucester, then worked with other newspapers and the publishing firm of John Bellows.

In 1896 he left England to join his brother, who had recently left Petersburg to establish a printing business in Adelaide, sailing in the P. & O. liner RMS Ophir. Sam left Adelaide that same year for Quorn to establish there a newspaper The Mercury for his brother. He was joined there by his wife and daughter, who had travelled out on a later voyage of the Ophir. The transition from lush green England to the harsh climate of the mid-north of South Australia, which was then in drought, came as a rude shock to the young lady. Two years later the Osborne family was on the move again; this time to Port Pirie, to found the Port Pirie Advertiser for his brother. Around 1925 Robert Osborne left for Launceston and divested himself of his South Australian assets, and the Port Pirie Advertiser ceased publication.

Sam Osborne joined with William Hancock in producing the Wooroora Producer in Balaklava and the Areas Express at Gladstone. He acted as the country correspondent for The Register then The Advertiser. He also wrote for English newspapers. He had a remarkable memory, and had kept a comprehensive set of records, which he used for his weekly "Personal Reminiscences" column in the Port Pirie Recorder from 1920 to October 1950, when he was obliged to discontinue writing – his mind was still clear, but he was no longer able to hold a pen. He died in Port Pirie Hospital and was buried in the local cemetery.

== Family ==
He married Miss Emily Cullimore at Gloucester in April 1892, and their first daughter was born before they left for Australia. They lived at 111 Gertrude street, Port Pirie. Emily Osborne and two daughters survived him: Doris (Mrs. J. Hoar of Port Pirie) and Ivey (Mrs. H. C. Vianello, of Semaphore).
