= Holly Hill =

Holly Hill may refer to:

persons

- Holly Hill (author) (born 1966), Australian author

places

- Holly Hill, Florida, a city
- Holly Hill, Hampstead, street in London, England
- Holly Hill (Roswell, Georgia), included in Roswell Historic District (Roswell, Georgia)
- Holly Hill (Friendship, Maryland), a historic house
- Holly Hill, Columbus, Ohio, a neighborhood
- Holly Hill, South Carolina, a town
- Holly Hill (Aylett, Virginia), a historic plantation

== See also ==
- Holly Hills (disambiguation)
