= Holly Hills =

Holly Hills may refer to:

- Holly Hills, Colorado, an enclave in Denver
- Holly Hills, St. Louis, a neighborhood in Missouri
- Holly Hills, Virginia, a community
- Holly Hills, a character in Diary of a Wimpy Kid

== See also ==
- Holly Hill (disambiguation)
