= Braemar Alliance =

The Braemar Alliance is a group of ASX-listed public and private mining and exploration companies with projects located in the Braemar region between Peterborough in South Australia and Broken Hill in neighboring New South Wales. The group was formed in 2011 with the intention of devising shared infrastructure solutions to provide water, power and freight corridors for the benefit of all members' projects. The Alliance's member companies have considered using existing outports and developing new ones on the eastern coast of Spencer Gulf to facilitate bulk exports, chiefly of iron ore. These include developing transshipping facilities at Port Pirie and building entirely new facilities at Myponie Point and south of Wallaroo (provisionally called Port Havilah). In July 2011, the Braemar Alliance had determined that its magnetite processing would require 50 gigalitres of water per year (135 megalitres per day) and that the water would be provided via a yet-to-be-constructed seawater desalination plant to be located on Spencer Gulf.

In 2011, the Braemar Alliance's membership included Carpentaria Exploration, Havilah Resources, Minotaur Exploration, Royal Resources and U_{3}O_{8} and private companies, Sinosteel PepinNini Curnamona Management, Bonython Metals Group and Wentworth Metal Group.

== Braemar Infrastructure ==
In 2012, the private company Braemar Infrastructure Pty Ltd was established. As of 2015, the company intends to developing an iron ore export facility at Myponie Point with up to four slurry pipelines connecting the port to various prospective mine sites in the Braemar region. Braemar Infrastructure is affiliated with Braemar Iron Pty Ltd, Lodestone Equities and Olary Magnetite Pty Ltd which own, hold and operate exploration licenses in the Braemar region.

== Status ==
In 2013, the Braemar bulk export infrastructure proposal received Major Development Status from the Government of South Australia. Braemar Infrastructure's chairman Graham Toll told the media that investment of $3 billion would need to be raised before the project could proceed.
