= Myponie Point =

Coordinates: 33.8303°S 137.6439°E

Myponie Point (also known as Tickera Point) is a geographical feature in the locality of Wallaroo Plain, 10 kilometres north of Wallaroo in South Australia.

The area is dominated by sloping bedrock and its shoreline mounts 10 to 20 metre high bluffs and steep gullies. Adjacent properties have been cleared for agricultural use. Several coastal shacks are present, and the area is used by rock and boat-based fishers. It is considered unsafe for swimming owing to its rockiness.

== Prospective port site ==
Myponie Point has been a prospective port site since 2002, when adjacent land was acquired by a syndicate of farmers and later the Australian Wheat Board for the purpose of developing new grain export facilities. Such facilities were never constructed. In the 2010s, Myponie Point was selected by the Braemar Alliance as their preferred location for an offshore floating port to facilitate future mineral exports. The project was declared a Major Project by the Government of South Australia in 2013. The project is intended to provide an export pathway for bulk commodities from developing mines located between Peterborough (SA) and Broken Hill (NSW).

Prior to its identification as a prospective port site, Myponie Point was occasionally visited by local scouting groups.
