= Max Piggott =

Australian rules footballer

Personal information
- Full name: Maxwell Ian Piggott
- Born: 20 June 1920; Albert Park, Melbourne, Victoria
- Died: 7 July 2010 (aged 90) near Albany, Western Australia
- Original team: Queenscliff / South Sydney
- Height: 183 cm (6 ft 0 in)
- Weight: 78 kg (172 lb)

Playing career^{1}
Years	Club	Games (Goals)
1946–1947	South Melbourne	8 (21)
- ^{1} Playing statistics correct to the end of 1947.

Maxwell Ian Piggott (20 June 1920 – 7 July 2010) was an Australian rules footballer who played with South Melbourne in the Victorian Football League (VFL).

== Early years and military ==
Piggott, the son of a policeman, grew up in the South Melbourne area and started his working life at the age of 14, for a soap manufacturer. He played his early football for Queenscliff and also made some appearances for South Sydney, while in New South Wales, due to his military service. His first overseas posting was in New Guinea, with the 2/5th Commando Unit, but after suffering malaria was sent home. He was also decommissioned, from lieutenant to private, due to conflicts with his commanding officers. Soon after he returned to New Guinea and would fight in the Battle of Wau, with the 2/6th Commando Unit.

== South Melbourne ==
Having returned to Melbourne after the war, Piggott began studying at Burnley Horticultural College. He put in some impressive performances with the South Melbourne seconds and in the 1946 VFL season was selected for his debut, just 10 days shy of his 26th birthday. His debut was against St Kilda at Junction Oval and he performed well at full-forward with four goals, playing on Keith Miller. He played in the opening four rounds of the 1947 season and kicked seven goals in a win over Carlton. An elbow injury then kept him out of the side until he announced his retirement mid year, for business reasons. He then moved to the Mornington Peninsula, where he bought a 64 hectare property.

== Later life ==
In 1967 he relocated to Western Australia and continued farming, in the state's south-west. He began working in the 1970s as a rural affairs writer for the Western Farmer & Grazier newspaper, later named the Farm Weekly.

Piggott was killed in a road accident on 7 July 2010, when the car he was driving was struck by a truck, north of Albany. He had been traveling to cover a field day for the Farm Weekly.
