= Lithgow Plot =

Purported 1970 assassination attempt of Queen Elizabeth II

The Lithgow Plot was a purported assassination attempt of Queen Elizabeth II on 29 April 1970 at Lithgow, New South Wales, while she was undertaking a royal tour of Australia. The Queen and her husband Prince Philip, Duke of Edinburgh were on a train trip from Sydney to Orange. The incident was first reported in January 2009.

== Incident ==
The would-be assassins supposedly rolled a large wooden log onto the tracks when it was dark and wedged it into place. It was meant to de-rail the train and, if it did, it would have smashed into an embankment. It failed because, at the time, the train was travelling unusually slowly when it struck the blockage, though it still slid for 700 metres before coming to a stop. The royal couple were unaware of the attempt.

A train had been through an hour before the Queen's train to check the line but at that time it was clear.

Australian IRA sympathisers were among the suspects, but no one was ever charged.

== Lack of coverage ==
In January 2009, retired Detective Superintendent Cliff McHardy gave the story to the Lithgow Mercury. The story was corroborated by Lithgow Mercury editor Len Ashworth, who said that the decision to not publish the story in 1970 was due to "an arrangement with the police". According to McHardy the government of Australia told the local police to keep quiet about the incident. This purportedly hampered the investigation attempt because people interviewed either couldn't or wouldn't speak about what had taken place.

In 2009, Buckingham Palace declined to comment on the issue but has said that a diary of the trip has shown no record of the train hitting a log. NSW Police's only comment was that they were "no longer actively investigating" the incident.
