= Orroroo =

Orroroo may refer to:

- Orroroo, South Australia, a town and locality
- Orroroo Enterprise, a former newspaper in South Australia
- District Council of Orroroo, a former local government area in South Australia

== See also ==
- District Council of Orroroo Carrieton
