= Milton Ulladulla Times =

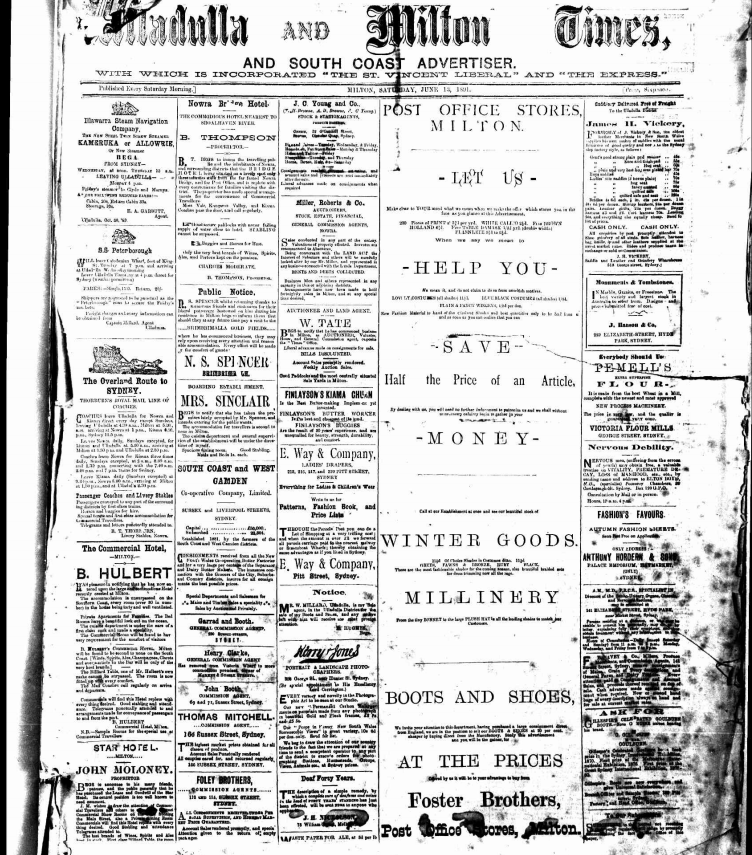
Ulladulla and Milton Times and South Coast Advertiser, 13 June 1891

The Milton Ulladulla Times is a weekly newspaper published in Ulladulla, New South Wales, Australia. It is printed and published by Paul Poulus for the Milton-Ulladulla Publishing Co. Pty. Ltd.

== History ==
The Milton Ulladulla Times is a weekly publication. The publication began as the Ulladulla and Milton Times in 1878 and remained with this title until 1969. It emerged again in 1978 as the Milton Ulladulla Times. The original paper consisted primarily of advertising and community news.

It also absorbed the Milton Ulladulla Express, which was first published in 1981 in Nowra, New South Wales. From 1981 to 1988 it was published as the Milton-Ulladulla on the Premier Coast Express and from 1991, until absorbed by the Times in 1998, as the Milton Ulladulla Express.

In September 2024, Australian Community Media announced it will shutter the paper. However, as of March 2025, the newspaper was still being published every Wednesday.

== Digitisation ==
The various versions of the paper have been digitised as part of the Australian Newspapers Digitisation Program project hosted by the National Library of Australia.

== See also ==
- List of newspapers in New South Wales

== Bibliography ==
- Holden, W Sprague 1961, Australia goes to press, Melbourne University Press, Melbourne.
- Mayer, Henry 1964, The press in Australia, Lansdowne Press, Melbourne.
- Walker, R B 1976, The newspaper press in New South Wales 1803-1920, Sydney University Press, Sydney.
