= The Islander (Australian newspaper) =

Newspaper in Kingscote, South Australia

- Type: Weekly newspaper
- Owner(s): Australian Community Media
- Founded: 1967
- Language: English
- City: Kingscote, South Australia
- Website: theislanderonline.com.au

The Islander is a weekly newspaper published in Kingscote, South Australia, founded in, and published continuously since, 1967. In addition to local news and events, "Council Matters", the Kangaroo Island Council's information to the community, is also published in the newspaper every Thursday It was later sold to Rural Press in 1995, previously owned by Fairfax Media, but now an Australian media company trading as Australian Community Media.

== History ==
Historically, there were several different newspapers issued on Kangaroo Island prior to the Islander. For example, the 4-page Kangaroo Island Courier (1907-1951), a weekly newspaper which was issued on the island on Saturdays. In June 1951, it was incorporated by the Glenelg Guardian, and a later separate insert version of that newspaper, The K.I. Courier (1957-1968) was also published by the Glenelg Guardian.

The first issue of The Islander was on 19 January 1967, continuing weekly until 4 August 1982. The newspaper quickly went on to absorb its main rival publication, The K.I. Courier. Between 11 August 1982 (issue No. 754) and 27 May 1987 (No. 994) it was briefly renamed as the Islander News Pictorial. The newspaper was sold to Rural Press (formerly part of Fairfax Media) in 1995. It celebrated its 50 years in 2017 with a 1960s retro-party event at its main office on Osmond Street, Kingscote.

== Distribution ==
Given Kangaroo Island's population of approximately 4,500 and the paper's weekly circulation of 2,000 copies the average issue readership is calculated to be around 3,200. Like other Rural Press publications, the newspaper is also available online.

== Preservation ==
The South Australian Library carries microfiche versions of the newspaper from the 1960s to 1970s, accessible on-line.
