= Manning River Times =

Regional newspaper in New South Wales, Australia

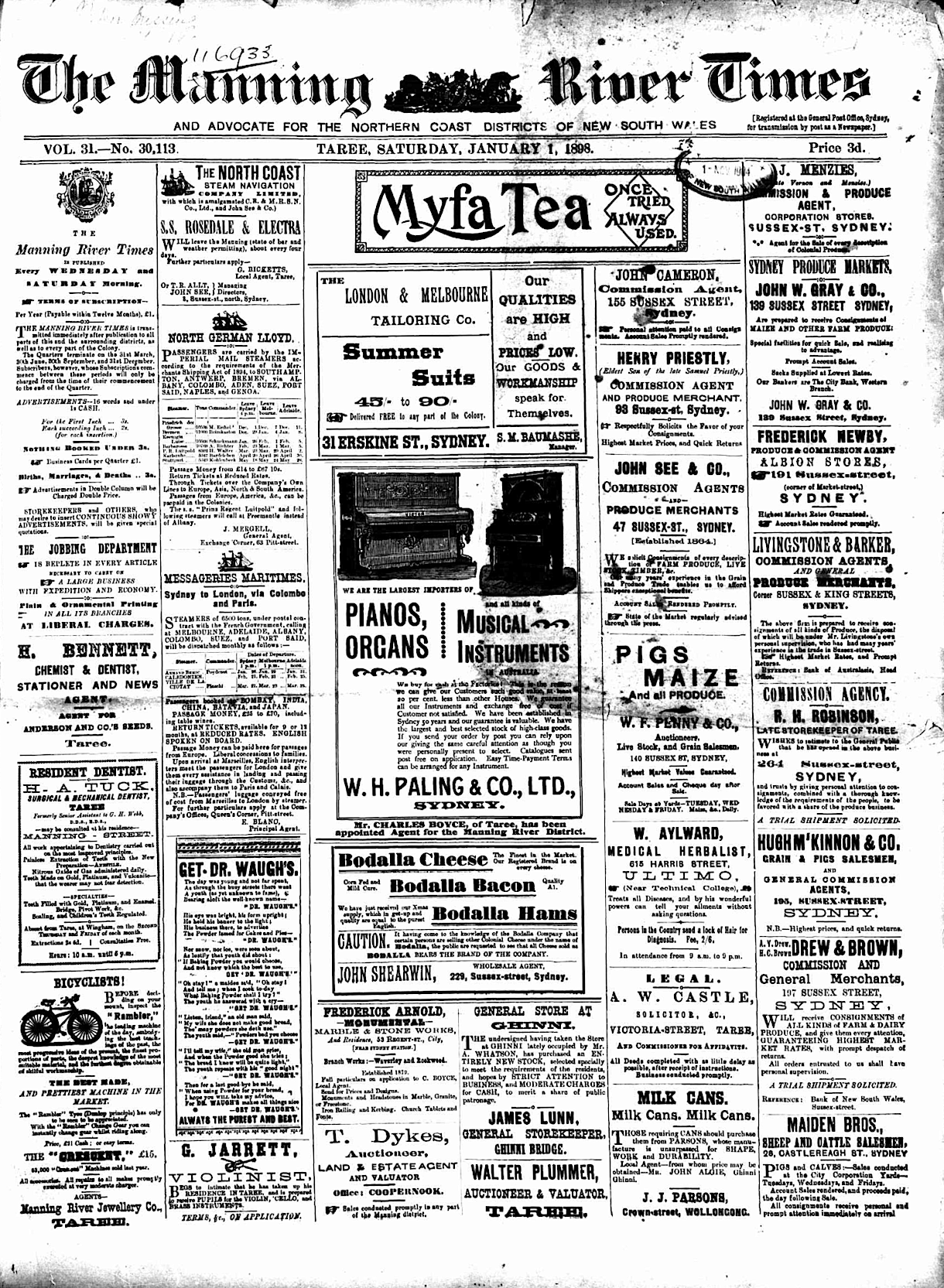
- Front page of The Manning River Times and Advocate for the Northern Coast Districts of New South Wales, 1 January 1898
- Type: Weekly newspaper
- Publisher: Australian Community Media
- Founded: 1952
- Language: English
- City: Taree, New South Wales
- Country: Australia
- Website: Official website

The Manning River Times, also published as The Manning River Times and Advocate for the Northern Coast Districts of New South Wales, is a weekly newspaper published in Taree, New South Wales, Australia.

== History ==
The Manning River Times is currently published in Taree, New South Wales, by Australian Community Media. The newspaper is titled after the Manning River which is a prominent river system near the town of Taree. The Manning River Times started publication in 1952 and is still published currently. Previously to 1952 the newspaper was published as The Manning River Times and Advocate for the Northern Coast Districts of New South Wales. It was first published by William Burnham Boyce (1869-1968) in 1896.

The Manning River Times and Advocate for the Northern Coast Districts of New South Wales was published twice a week on Wednesday and Saturday up until 1954. In 1954 under the title Manning River Times it expanded publication to 3 times a week on Monday, Wednesday and Friday. However the Manning River Times was published twice a week on Wednesday and Friday. In February 2025, Australian Community Media reduced the printed edition to weekly.

== Digitisation ==
The paper has been digitised as part of the Australian Newspapers Digitisation Program of the National Library of Australia.
