= City Messenger =

Newspaper in Adelaide, Australia

- Type: Weekly suburban newspaper
- Format: Tabloid
- Owner(s): News Limited
- Editor: Kara Phillips
- Staff writers: Alice Higgins
- Founded: 1988
- Headquarters: 94 The Parade, Norwood, SA, Australia
- Website: www.citymessenger.com.au

City Messenger is a weekly suburban newspaper in Adelaide, part of the Messenger Newspapers group. The City covers the Adelaide CBD and surrounding suburbs and has recently experimented with targeting public transport commuters, similar to mX, also owned by News Limited.

The newspaper generally reports on events of interest in its distribution area, including the suburbs of Adelaide, North Adelaide, Medindie and Hackney. It also covers the City of Adelaide, Town of Walkerville, City of Prospect and City of Norwood Payneham St Peters councils.

The paper also features South Australia's only remaining anonymous columnist, the shadowy Ray Light.

It has a circulation of 27,999 and a readership of 56,000.

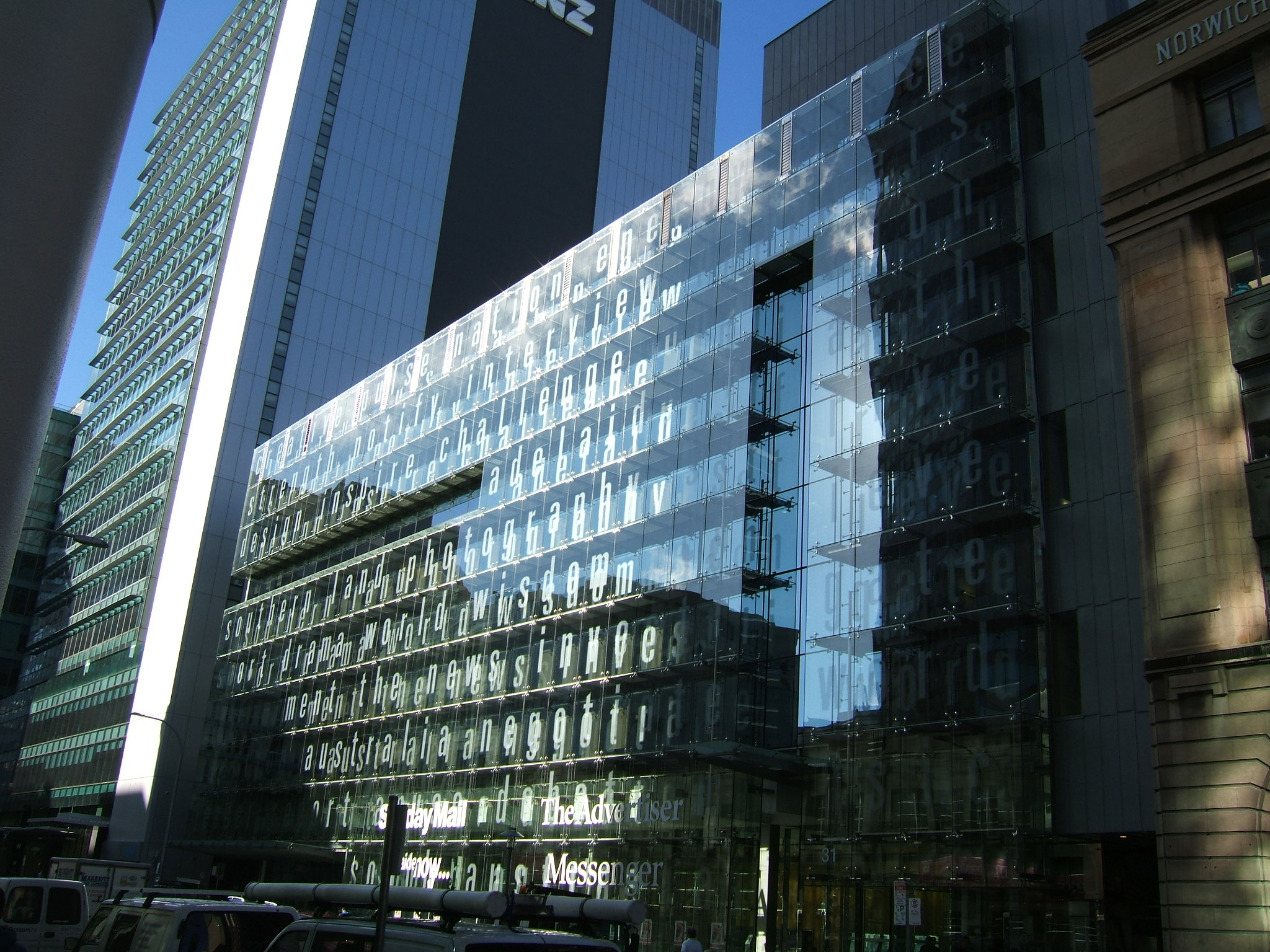
The office of the Messenger group of newspapers in Waymouth St, Adelaide
