= Holly Hill (author) =

Australian author

Holly Hill is the Australian author of the memoirs Sugarbabe and Toyboy, published by Random House Australia in 2007 and 2008. Sugarbabe was later published in New York 2010 by Skyhorse Publishing. It was publicized in the media including guest appearances on CNN, Larry King, Dr Phil, 60 Minutes and Playboy Radio.

== Biography ==
Hill was born in 1966 in Canberra, Australia. She went to public schools and started out as a cadet journalist with the Port Macquarie News. She later went to the University of Southern Queensland in Toowoomba and graduated in 1990 with an Arts degree in Human Behaviour.

Hill moved to Sydney and was the state coordinator of the Schizophrenia Fellowship of New South Wales before stepping sideways into public relations at the University of Sydney and the Australian Financial Markets Association, returning to Port Macquarie in 1998 as a public relations manager for Country Energy.

Geoffrey William Hill, 64, Holly Hill's father, was killed in his Gold Coast home in January 1999 by his estranged wife, Erlinda Rosal Hill, 52, of Surfers Paradise. Holly Hill shattered her right leg and ankle in a skydiving accident on 23 December 2000, and fought much of her father’s case from her hospital bed. Erlinda Hill was found guilty of manslaughter on 29 May 2001, of what she claimed to be a planned double suicide.

Holly Hill spent two years on crutches, becoming employed in May 2003 with her rehabilitator, CRS Australia. She worked with a variety of clients suffering physical and mental injuries, transferring to Blacktown CRS in Sydney’s western suburbs in June 2005. She quit work in December of the same year at the behest of her wealthy lover "John," the ensuing events detailed in Sugarbabe and Toyboy.

Hill's term negotiated infidelity, as used in Sugarbabe, sparked passionate debate on talkback radio and chatrooms, with thousands of comments by enraged monogamists and supporters alike. Hill and Charles Philip Dean, her partner at the time, conducted a four-year ‘road test’ of the lifestyle as research for her third memoir, The Velvet Pouch (HarperCollins, April 2013).
