= Southern Times Messenger =

Newspaper in Adelaide, Australia

- Type: Weekly suburban newspaper
- Format: Tabloid
- Owner(s): News Limited
- Editor: Steph Wilson
- Staff writers: Sarah Garvis & Jane Whitford
- Founded: 1956
- Headquarters: 17 – 19 Stanley Street, Morphett Vale, SA, Australia
- Website: www.messengersouth.com.au

Southern Times Messenger is a weekly suburban newspaper in Adelaide, part of the Messenger Newspapers group. The Southern Times' area stretches from Lonsdale in the north, through to Sellicks Beach in the south, and covers the southern suburbs, accessible from the city via Main South Road and the more recently constructed Southern Expressway. The newspaper generally reports on events of interest in its distribution area, including the suburbs of Morphett Vale, Noarlunga, Reynella and Aldinga. It also covers the City of Onkaparinga council. It has a circulation of 57,690 and a readership of 95,000.

== History ==
The publication began life as the Seasider (August 1956 – 19 September 1963). The masthead title stated that it was "Circulating throughout Port Noarlunga, Christies Beach, McLaren Vale, Reynella, Moana, Morphett Vale, McLaren Flat, Willunga, Noarlunga, O'Halloran Hill and Happy Valley." The publication was then renamed to The Southern Times: incorporating the Seasider (26 September 1963 - 30 May 1984), after which it was renamed Southern Times Messenger (6 June 1984 – present).
