= East Torrens Messenger =

Weekly newspaper in Adelaide, South Australia

- Type: Weekly suburban newspaper
- Format: Tabloid
- Owner: News Limited
- Editor: Chantelle Kroehn & Shannon Caton
- Staff writers: Brittany Dupree
- Founded: 1984
- Headquarters: 94 The Parade, Norwood, SA, Australia
- Website: www.messengereast.com.au

East Torrens Messenger is a weekly suburban newspaper in Adelaide, part of the Messenger Newspapers group. The East Torrens' area is bounded by Hackney Road to the west, the River Torrens Valley to the north, Magill Road to the south and the Athelstone foothills in the east.

The newspaper generally reports on events of interest in its distribution area, including the suburbs of Payneham, Magill, Athelstone and Paradise. It also covers the City of Campbelltown and City of Norwood Payneham & St Peters.

It has a circulation of 33,123 and a readership of 44,000.

== History ==
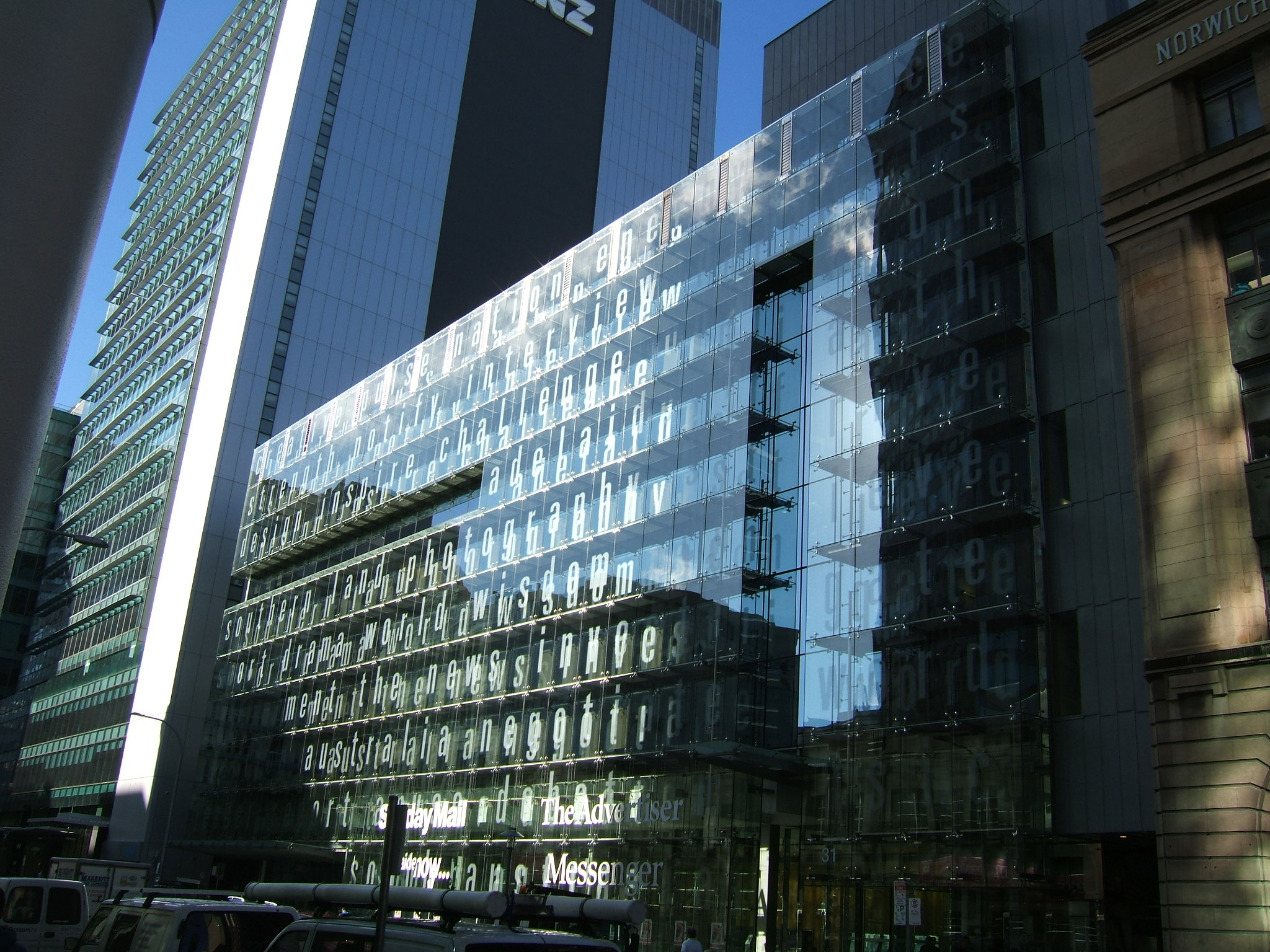
The office of the Messenger group of newspapers in Waymouth St, Adelaide

The Payneham Messenger was established in 1984. In 2000, the paper was renamed the East Torrens Messenger.
