= William H. Bennett (newspaperman) =

Australian newspaper editor and proprietor

William Henry "Dick" Bennett (21 July 1879 – 29 May 1939) was an Australian newspaper editor and proprietor in Peterborough, South Australia.

== History ==
W. H. Bennett was born in Kapunda to Mr. and Mrs. Thomas Bennett, who moved to Petersburg, as Peterborough was then named, when he was six months old. He was educated at the Sisters of St. Joseph School (later named St. Anacletus' Hall), and followed his brother James J. Bennett (c. 1873 – 7 March 1900) in the printing trade with R. M. Osborne at the Petersburg Times in 1894. In September 1899 he was sent to Quorn to manage the Quorn Mercury, which he turned into a prosperous business. In 1908 he purchased the business from Osborne, and almost immediately had a tremendous setback in the destruction of the Peterborough printery by fire. But he persevered and built the business, with the Booleroo Magnet and the purchase of the Orroroo Enterprise from Colonel Tom Hancock and the Weekly Times of Adelaide. He kept himself aware of improvements in printing technology and always had equipment of the most up to date design appropriate to his business.

He was brought up in a good Catholic family. He served as an altar-boy and as an assistant to Father (later Bishop) Norton. He was vice-president of the local Holy Name Society and for many years member of the Hibernian Australian Catholic Benefit Society. He was also highly respected by those of other faiths; high tributes from leaders of many other churches were published after his death.

He was a keen tennis player and an ardent racegoer; he gave unstinting support in his newspapers to coverage of local sport, and was particularly helpful in helping establish baseball and lawn bowls into Peterborough. He was one of the founding members of the S.A. Provincial Press Association and a director almost from its inception. He served as Justice of the Peace and was a shareholder in the Co-operative Society for twenty-four years. He died, some said of overwork, after some months of increasingly poor health and a stroke, in a private hospital in Glenelg. His body was brought back to Peterborough, and his funeral cortege was a mile long.

== Family ==
He married Evangeline Beatrix "Eva" Staer, whose father ran the Petersburg Hotel, on 8 January 1902; they lived at Quorn for seven years before moving to Peterborough. Their children included Moya (Mrs. P. J. Sullivan), Valmai Bennett, Betty Bennett, John Staer "Jack" Bennett (of Peterborough), Harry Staer Bennett (who ran the Orroroo Enterprise), Thomas Staer "Tom" Bennett (in Adelaide) and Frederick Staer "Fred" Bennett of Millicent.
