= Leader Messenger =

Australian weekly newspaper

- Type: Weekly suburban newspaper
- Format: Tabloid
- Owner(s): News Limited
- Editor-in-chief: Jessica Leo
- News editor: Rob Greenwood
- Staff writers: Erin Jones
- Founded: 1965
- Headquarters: 25 Wiltshire St, Salisbury, SA, Australia
- Website: www.leadermessenger.com.au

Leader Messenger is a weekly suburban newspaper in Adelaide, part of the Messenger Newspapers group. The Leader's area covers the outer north-eastern suburbs of Adelaide, extending between Windsor Gardens on the city side and Golden Grove on the hills side.

The newspaper generally reports on events of interest in its distribution area, including the suburbs of Golden Grove, Tea Tree Gully, Modbury and Holden Hill. It also covers the City of Tea Tree Gully council.

It has a circulation of 43,314 and a readership of 65,000.

== History ==
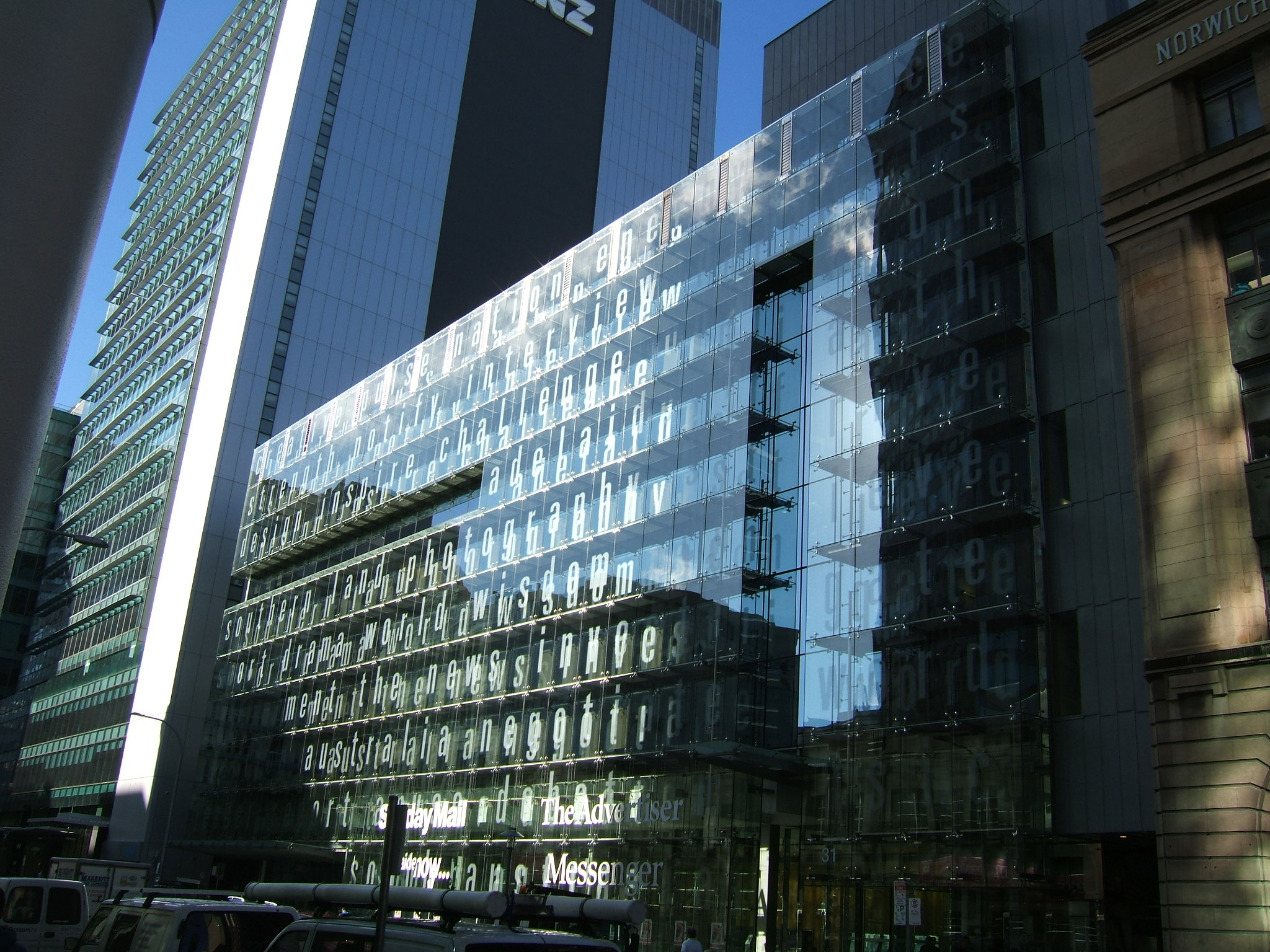
The office of the Messenger group of newspapers in Waymouth St, Adelaide

The North East Leader was established by Messenger in 1965. In 1984, the paper was renamed the Leader Messenger.
