= Robert M. Osborne =

Australian newspaper proprietor and editor

Robert Martin Osborne (c. 1852 – 22 September 1931) was a newspaper editor and proprietor of several newspapers in South Australia, notably the Petersburg Times.

Osborne emigrated to South Australia in 1884. He worked on the Port Augusta Dispatch and ran a newspaper in Teetulpa before he was approached by the mayor of Petersburg about establishing a newspaper. The Petersburg Times, Orroroo Chronicle and Northern Advertiser was established in August 1887. Obsborn was active in the Petersburg community and, for a time, a member of the town council. In 1896, he and his brother Samuel Osborne founded the Quorn Mercury and the Advertiser in Port Pirie, where he remained for many years. In 1897, Robert left Petersburg to establish a printing business in Adelaide. He also founded The Farm for the S.A. Farmers' Co-operative Union, and The S.A. Freemason. He purchased The Garden and Field, edited the Unley Citizen, and for a time ran The Critic. In 1909, Osborne sold the PetersburgTimes and Quorn Mercury to former employee, William Bennett. Robert left for Launceston, Tasmania, where he served as alderman and was elected mayor in 1929.

== Biography ==
Robert was born at Birdbush, Wiltshire, the son of Rev. Robert Ivey Osborne. He was apprenticed to a printer, and had experience in England, Scotland, Ireland and New York before emigrating to South Australia on the steamer John Elder in 1884.

He worked on David Drysdale's Port Augusta Dispatch, and ran a newspaper in Teetulpa before founding The Petersburg Times, Orroroo Chronicle and Northern Advertiser in 1887. He was active in the Petersburg community and, for a time, a member of the town council, helping establish trees and in other ways improving the town. In 1896, his brother Samuel W. Osborne came out from England to assist him and, together, they founded the Quorn Mercury and the Advertiser in Port Pirie, where he remained for many years.

In 1897, Osborne left Petersburg to establish a printing business in Victoria Square, Adelaide, later moving to Currie Street. He founded The Farm for the S.A. Farmers' Co-operative Union, and The S.A. Freemason. He purchased The Garden and Field (edited by Alexis L. Holtze, son of M. W. Holtze), edited the Unley Citizen, and for a time ran The Critic. In 1909, Osborne sold the Times and Quorn Mercury to William H. Bennett, previously an employee. The building, which was still owned by Osborne, was destroyed by fire 23 December 1909, at a great loss to Bennett.

Osborne left for Launceston, where he served as alderman, and was elected mayor in 1929. He died in Sydney in 1931 following a surgical operation.

== Family ==
He married Laura Martha Axford, (c. 1861 – 16 April 1928) on 26 January 1887, who predeceased him as well as an infant son. Osborne was survived by the couple's two daughters, Mrs. L. F. Sutherland, of Sydney, and Miss Dorothy Osborne, of Launceston.

== Writings ==
- "Our Fortieth Birthday 1887-1927: Reminiscences by Robert M. Osborne Esq. JP". The Times and Northern Advertiser, Peterborough, South Australia. 12 Aug 1927. page 3.
