= Burra Record =

Newspaper in Burra, South Australia

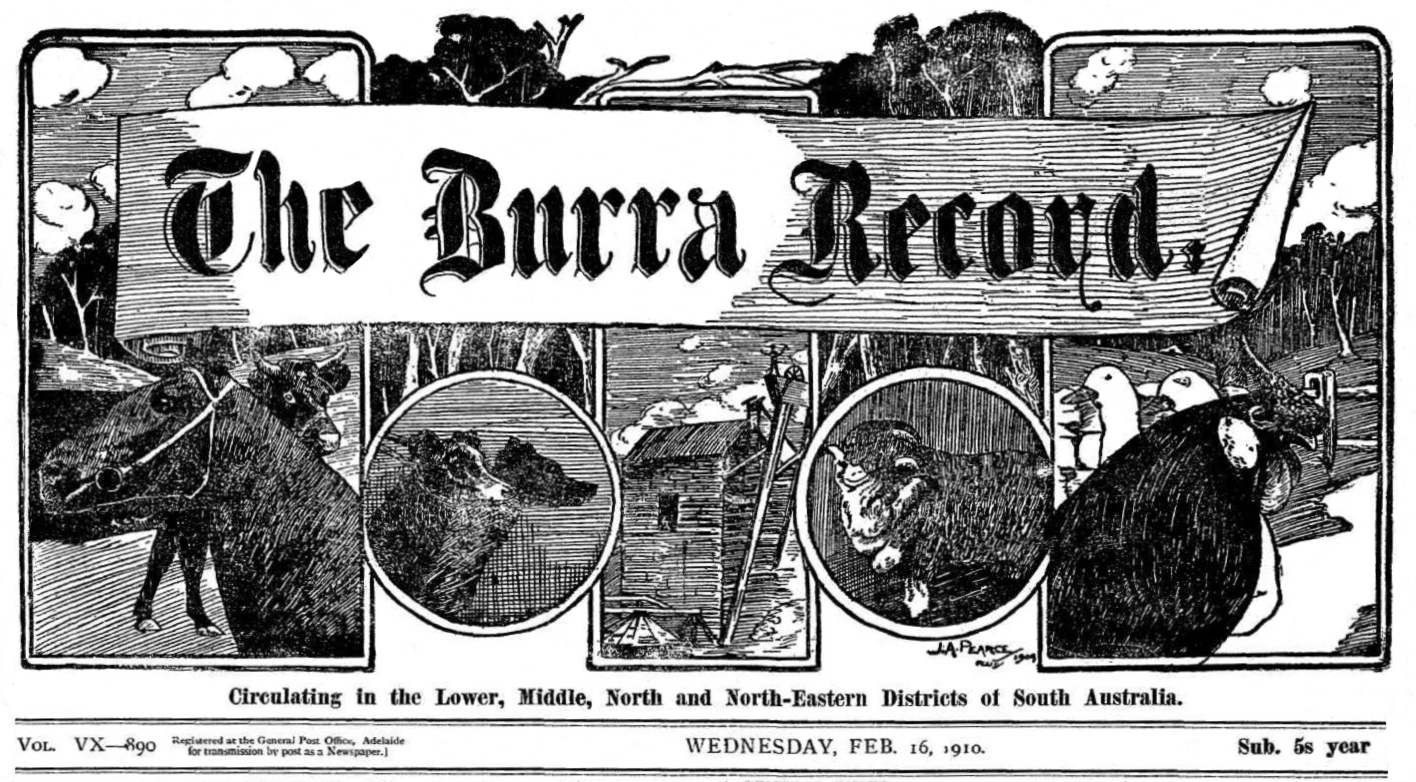
The paper's masthead in 1910

The Burra Record was a newspaper covering Burra and the mid-north eastern area of South Australia that was first printed in June 1876. In 1977, it merged with the Review-Times to form the Review-Times-Record, which in turn became The Flinders News in 1989.

Most issues published between July 1878 and January 1954 are freely available online, via Trove.

== History ==
The Burra Record began life as the Northern Mail which was first published on 30 June 1876 for distribution in Kooringa. After 26 weekly issues, in 1877, it was renamed to Burra News and Northern Mail. After another 77 issues, the newspaper was then purchased by Frederick Holder, future Premier of South Australia, in June 1878. Schoolmaster Holder, newly married and about to become a father, had missed out on the position in charge of the new Burra Model School. He was forced to look for other work, and took over a local store, selling books, wallpapers, and homeopathic medicines. He also became Town Clerk and bought the Record from Henry Pether.

The newspaper was then called The Record, subtitled "a paper for the Burra and north-east" (5 July 1878 - 27 September 1878), continuing previous publication order. From Friday, 4 October 1878, it was renamed The Burra Record. Initially the main newspaper was run by a committee. Holder was managing editor, but three colleagues scrutinised the subject matter. Holder was successful in the new venture, and was one of many newspaper owners who followed their political views in print by standing for Parliament. Holder also organised another publication, the North Eastern Times and Terowie News (7 January 1881 - 29 December 1882) before selling it to a partner. In 1887 Holder was elected the member for Burra, continuing to run the main newspaper until 1891. In 1892 he became premier, having sold the Burra Record to William Jenkin Davey.

The Burra Record continued until March 1977 when, with the Review Times, the newspaper was merged to form the Review-Times-Record. At the time of its demise, the Burra Record was run by R.E. and A.J. Angel.
