= Port Stephens Examiner =

Australian newspaper

- Type: Weekly newspaper
- Format: Tabloid
- Publisher: Australian Community Media
- Launched: 24 November 1893
- Headquarters: William Street; Raymond Terrace; New South Wales 2324
- City: Raymond Terrace
- Country: Australia
- Website: www.portstephensexaminer.com.au

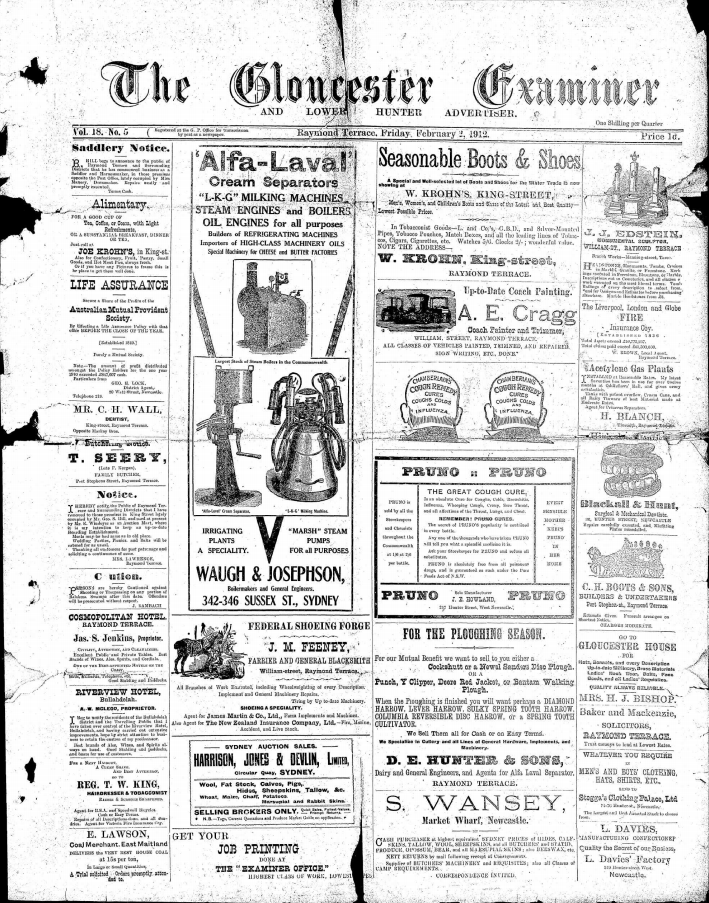
Front page of Gloucester Examiner and Lower Hunter Advertiser, 2 February 1912

The Port Stephens Examiner is a weekly newspaper published in Raymond Terrace, New South Wales, Australia since 1893. The Port Stephens Examiner has also been published as the Gloucester Examiner and Lower Hunter Advertiser and the Raymond Terrace Examiner and Lower Hunter and Port Stephens Advertiser.

== History ==
The Gloucester Examiner and Lower Hunter Advertiser was first published on 24 November 1893 by William Brown. Brown had earlier worked on the Gloucester Gazette and Lower Hunter and Williams River Advocate which had ceased publication earlier in 1893. Brown changed the name of the paper to Raymond Terrace Examiner and Lower Hunter and Port Stephens Advertiser in 1905. In 1981 the name was changed to the Port Stephens Examiner and it continues to be published under this name by Australian Community Media.

== Digitisation ==
The paper has been digitised as part of the Australian Newspapers Digitisation Program project of the National Library of Australia.

== See also ==
- List of newspapers in Australia
- List of newspapers in New South Wales
