= West Coast Sentinel =

Weekly newspaper in Ceduna, South Australia

- Type: Weekly newspaper
- Owner(s): Australian Community Media
- Founded: 1912
- Language: English
- City: Ceduna, South Australia
- Website: westcoastsentinel.com.au

The West Coast Sentinel is a weekly newspaper published Thursdays in Ceduna, South Australia. It was founded in mid-1912, and has been published continuously since then. It was later sold to Rural Press, previously owned by Fairfax Media, but now an Australian media company trading as Australian Community Media.

== History ==
The West Coast Sentinel (subtitled: "circulating throughout the Great West Coast. Eyre's Peninsula") began publication in Streaky Bay on Friday 28 June 1912. At the time, its publishers hoped that the paper's reach would extend beyond its initial region stating, "...although the journal is to be published at Streaky Bay it will serve the whole West Coast, and endeavor to safeguard interests and foster development of the smallest, equally the largest town or settlement".

On 25 April 1925, the title of the newspaper was simplified to West Coast Sentinel, with a subtitle that read "A Weekly Paper alive to the needs of the West Coast." and a subtitle that read: "The only paper published on the great West Coast of S.A." In 1930, due to pressures from the Great Depression, the newspaper absorbed the Western Mail (13 July 1928 - 25 December 1930), which was printed by A.C. Lawrie. In addition, the newspaper also printed the short-lived Eyre Peninsula Rural Chronicle (1987–1990), and a sister publication, the Peninsula Farmer, in conjunction with the Port Lincoln Times.

Alongside many other rural publications in Australia, the newspaper was a member of Fairfax Media Limited.

== Distribution ==
The newspaper is published every Thursday, a print run of approximately 3,000 copies which are sold across the Eyre Peninsula and Far West including: Ceduna, Streaky Bay, Wudinna, Elliston, Yalata, Nundroo, Penong, Thevenard, Smoky Bay, Port Kenny, Venus Bay, Wirrulla, Poochera, Minnipa, and Kyancutta. It has a claimed average weekly readership of 5,600. Like other Rural Press publications, the newspaper is also available online.

== Digitisation ==
Australian National Library carries images and text versions of the newspaper from 1912 to 1954, accessible using Trove, the on-line newspaper retrieval service.
