= Port Lincoln Times =

- Type: Weekly newspaper
- Owner(s): Australian Community Media
- Founded: August 1927
- Language: English
- City: Port Lincoln, South Australia
- Website: portlincolntimes.com.au

The Port Lincoln Times is a newspaper published weekly in Port Lincoln, South Australia. It was first printed in August 1927, and has been published continuously ever since. It was later sold to Rural Press, previously owned by Fairfax Media, but now an Australian media company trading as Australian Community Media.

== History ==
The origins of the Port Lincoln Times began when the Recorder in Port Pirie was taken over by Mrs R.L. McGregor and her two sons. McGregor had worked under David Drysdale at the Port Augusta Dispatch and claims she was instrumental in suggesting that he start a newspaper in Port Lincoln. In 1925, she was approached by another former Dispatch employee, Maurice Hill, to sell the Recorder, but she refused, and as a result, Hill, along with J.E. Edwards, founded the Port Lincoln Times.

The Port Lincoln Times was first published on 5 August 1927, and unlike many newspapers of the time, it did not continue or subsume a previous publication, and used a simple banner title without a definite article or sur- and sub-titles. On page 6 of the first issue, the new publication was introduced as both independent and non-sectarian, alongside an overall aim "to entertain and instruct by giving the whole of the news of the district which it serves, and to give it brightly, briefly, accurately and completely".

It absorbed the West Coast Recorder in 1942 as a result of wartime consolidations. In 1960, it also absorbed the Areas Express (17 September 1959 - 8 September 1960), which had been printed in Cleve.

Since its founding, the company has been situated on the same site on Washington Street, Port Lincoln, since 1927. By the 1960s, the Hill family had modernised the look of the paper (with large front-page headlines, sport action photographs and large advertisements), and in 1990 the newspaper was taken over by Rural Press. Alongside many other rural publications in Australia (e.g. Eyre Peninsula Tribune), the newspaper was a member of Fairfax Media Limited, a national company which has been purchasing and rationalising publication assets across the country.

In addition, the newspaper also printed a short-lived free newspaper, the Eyre Peninsula Rural Chronicle (1987–1990), and a sister publication, the Peninsula Farmer, in conjunction with the West Coast Sentinel.

== West Coast Recorder ==
The West Coast Recorder began printing in 1904 as the Port Lincoln, Tumby and West Coast Recorder which was shortened to the West Coast Recorder in 1909. The Recorder, had absorbed the Streaky Bay Standard and West Coast Advertiser (1912), which was only issued twice by David Drysdale in early April that year, and quickly became a "Supplement to the West Coast recorder". It continued until it combined with the Port Lincoln Times in 1942. It was the first major newspaper established in Port Lincoln. The Port Lincoln History Group was raising funds in 2020 to work with the State Library of South Australia to digitise all editions of the newspaper and make them available on Trove.

== Distribution ==
The Port Lincoln Times is published on Thursdays and is printed in Murray Bridge at the high-tech Rural Press printing centre. It serves the Lower Eyre Peninsula area, namely: Port Lincoln, Arno Bay, Cleve, Coffin Bay, Colton, Coomunga, Coulta, Cowell, Cummins, Darke Peak, Edillilie, Elliston, Karkoo, Kimba, Kyancutta, Lipson, Lock, Louth Bay, Mount Damper, Mount Hope, Mount Wedge, North Shields, Port Neill, Rudall, Sheringa, Talia, Tooligie, Tumby Bay, Ungarra, Wangary, Wanilla, Warramboo, Warrow, Wharminda, Wudinna, Yallunda Flat, and Yeelanna. The current monthly readership is estimated to be 19,000. Like other Rural Press publications, the newspaper is also available online.

== Digitisation ==
Australian National Library carries images and text versions of the newspaper from 1927 to 1954, accessible using Trove, the on-line newspaper retrieval service. In 2020 the Port Lincoln History Group was raising funds to also digitise the West Coast Recorder.
