= Hills Valley Weekly =

- Type: Weekly suburban newspaper
- Format: Tabloid
- Owner: News Limited
- Editor: Steph Wilson
- Staff writers: Nadine Bishop
- Founded: 1973
- Headquarters: 141 Morphett Road, Morphettville, SA, Australia
- Website: http://messenger.smedia.com.au/hills-valley-weekly/

The Hills Valley Weekly (formerly the Hills & Valley Messenger) is a weekly suburban newspaper in Adelaide, part of the Messenger Newspapers group. The Hills & Valley's area is bounded by the Belair National Park in the north-east, and the suburbs of Darlington to the west and Happy Valley to the south. Its western border roughly divides the foothills from the Adelaide plains.

The newspaper generally reports on events of interest in its distribution area, including the suburbs of Belair, Blackwood, Flagstaff Hill and Aberfoyle Park. It also covers the City of Mitcham and City of Onkaparinga councils.

It has a circulation of 19,253 and a readership of 35,000.

The office for the Hills & Valley Messenger has moved in recent times from the Southern Times Office in Morphett Vale to the Guardian Office in Morphettville.

== History ==
The Hills Gazette was established in 1973 and was renamed the Hills Messenger in 1984. In 1990, the paper was merged with the Belair/Blackwood Messenger and renamed Hills & Valley Messenger.
