= Stock Journal =

Australian newspaper

- Type: Weekly newspaper
- Owner: Australian Community Media
- Founded: 1967
- Language: English
- City: Adelaide, South Australia
- Website: stockjournal.com.au

The Stock Journal is a weekly newspaper published in Adelaide, South Australia, and published continuously since 1967. A predecessor publication, the Adelaide Stock and Station Journal, dates back to August 1904. It was later sold to Rural Press, previously owned by Fairfax Media, but now an Australian media company trading as Australian Community Media.

== History ==
The Stock Journal began on 22 August 1904 as the Adelaide Stock and Station Journal (subtitled: containing reports of the Adelaide and country live stock markets, also the wool, grain and produce markets). Printed in Adelaide by Vardon & Pritchard, it concentrated primarily on market reports and advertising. During the 1920s the journal expanded its coverage to include some political and social comment, as well as agricultural subjects. It was later subtitled: official organ of the Adelaide Woolbrokers' Association, the South Australian Stocksalesmen's Association.

On 1 February 1967, the Journal was renamed to its current title. It was previously owned by Fairfax Media, with its main office on Greenhill Road in Eastwood, South Australia.

=== Pastoral Pioneers ===
An article series within the newspaper, called Pastoral Pioneers and written by Advertiser journalist Rodney Cockburn, was printed in 1927 as a two-volume book, and later re-released in CD format in 2007. According to the book's original foreword:

This volume represents ... biographical sketches dealing with the achievements of South Australia's Pastoral Pioneers. Publication of the series began in the "Adelaide Stock and Station Journal" on January 10, 1923, and continued weekly until August 10, 1927. During that period a total of 230 articles was published, and the number of pastoralists to receive attention is in the neighbourhood of 300. It may fairly be claimed, therefore, that the two volumes contain the most comprehensive collection of biographies ever produced in Australia in relation to the pastoral industry of any one State. No really representative pioneer sheep-farmer or cattle-breeder who operated in South Australia has been overlooked, and in many cases it has been possible to retrieve from almost complete oblivion the interesting records of lesser lights.

== Distribution ==
According to the Audit Bureau of Circulations, the weekly circulation is around 9600 copies. Like other Rural Press publications, the newspaper is also available online.

== Digitisation ==
Australian National Library and State Library of South Australia carry text and microform versions of the older newspaper from August 1906 to January 1967.
