= The Nambucca and Bellinger News =

The Nambucca and Bellinger News, 24 November 1911

The Nambucca and Bellinger News was a weekly English language newspaper published in Bowraville in the Nambucca Shire of New South Wales, Australia from 1911-1945. It was also published as Nambucca News: Bellingen Chronicle, The Nambucca District News, The Nambucca Guardian News, Guardian Gazette and The Nambucca Valley Guardian News.

== Newspaper history ==
The Nambucca and Bellinger News was published from 1911–1945. Prior to this it was known as the Nambucca News. It was continued by The Nambucca District News (1945-1966), now published in Macksville in the Nambucca Shire, then later merged with The Nambucca Guardian News and the Guardian Gazette (1958-1966) to form The Nambucca Valley Guardian News (1992-1997).

== Digitisation ==
The Nambucca and Bellinger News has been digitised as part of the Australian Newspapers Digitisation Program of the National Library of Australia.

== See also ==
- List of newspapers in Australia
- List of newspapers in New South Wales
