= Guardian Messenger =

Weekly newspaper

- Type: Weekly suburban newspaper
- Format: Tabloid
- Owner(s): News Limited
- Editor-in-chief: Matt Deighton
- News editor: Andrew Spence & Rachel Moore
- Staff writers: Katelin Nelligan & Emma Altschwager
- Founded: 1913
- Headquarters: 141 Morphett Road, Morphettville, SA, Australia
- Sister newspapers: Messenger Newspapers
- Website: www.guardianmessenger.com.au

Guardian Messenger is a weekly suburban newspaper in Adelaide, part of the Messenger Newspapers group. The Guardian's area is bounded by Hallett Cove in the south, Main South Road to the east, the airport, and the coastline. The newspaper generally reports on events of interest in its distribution area, including the suburbs of Glenelg, Marion, Hallett Cove and Morphettville. It also covers the City of Holdfast Bay, City of Marion and City of West Torrens councils.

== History ==
The Glenelg Guardian was established in 1913. For much of this time, it was owned by the Smedley family of Glenelg. One-time editor of the Glenelg Guardian, Alan Smedley, became the Glenelg mayor.

In June 1951, the Glenelg Guardian incorporated the 4-page Kangaroo Island Courier, a weekly newspaper issued on the island on Saturdays. The first issue of the Courier was on 2 November 1907, with the last being 25 May 1951 (Vol. XLIV, No.19), when subscribers were informed of the benefits of the merger. A later insert version, The K.I. Courier (1957–1968), was also published by the Glenelg Guardian, and sold to its rival publication The Islander.

In 1964, the paper was acquired by Messenger owner Roger Baynes and renamed The Guardian and Retailer. In 1984, the paper was renamed Guardian Messenger. By 2007, it has a circulation of 70,162 and a readership of 83,000.
