= The Times and Northern Advertiser =

Former Local Newspaper in St Peterborough, South Australia

The Times and Northern Advertiser (subtitled: Peterborough, South Australia) was a weekly newspaper published in Peterborough, South Australia from 1887 to 1970. The first issue of The Petersburg Times: Orroroo Chronicle and Northern Advertiser appeared on 12 August 1887.

Throughout its run, The Petersburg Times retained it name, although the subtitle changed numerous times. However, in May 1919, the paper's name was changed to The Times and Northern Advertiser, Peterborough, South Australia in response to the government's wish to remove Germanic placenames. In 1946, the newspaper absorbed the Jamestown Star and Farmer's Journal. In 1970, the Times was merged with two other northern newspapers to become the Review-Times, which soon became defunct.

== History ==
=== Establishment ===
Petersburg was a very small town in 1887 when the railway to Broken Hill was being built, and a decision had to be made whether the ore from the mines should be shipped from Port Augusta, Port Pirie or Port Adelaide. If it were to be Port Pirie, the line would pass through Petersburg.

In 1887, anxious to improve the status of the town, particularly as against rival Terowie, the town's mayor, William Thredgold, approached Robert M. Osborne, who had worked on the Port Augusta Dispatch and run a newspaper in Teetulpa, with a view to establishing a newspaper. The old Anglican church building would have been an ideal premises but it could not be got ready soon enough; so an old iron shed near the mill crossing was made available. Osborne found a likely assistant in H. P. Colebatch, who later became Premier of Western Australia.

The first issue of The Petersburg Times (subtitled: Orroroo Chronicle and Northern Advertiser), was a single sheet (four pages), which appeared on 12 August 1887. Barton Pullen was appointed the paper's agent and correspondent in Orroroo. A new building was erected by Osborne in 1891 on the corner of Bismarck and Jervois streets.

=== Through the years ===
The managing editor of the papers from 1896 was James "Jim" Bennett (c. 1873 – 7 March 1900), who was succeeded by Kinso C. H. Ewins, of Burra. In 1909, R. M. Osborne sold The Times and the Quorn Mercury to W. H. Bennett, brother of the late editor who had been successfully managing the Quorn Mercury for the previous nine years. The building, which was still owned by Osborne, was destroyed by fire 23 December 1909, at a great loss to Mr. Bennett, who persisted and built the paper into a thriving business.

Throughout its run, The Petersburg Times retained it name, although the subtitle evolved from Orroroo Chronicle and Northern Advertiser, to Terowie, Yongala, and Northern Advertiser, and finally Northern Advertiser. In May 1919, the name was changed again to The Times and Northern Advertiser, Peterborough, South Australia in response to the government's wish to remove Germanic placenames, but was not done gladly.

Bennett also founded the Booleroo Magnet and purchased the Orroroo Enterprise from Colonel Tom Hancock in 1928 and took over the Weekly Times of Adelaide. He installed up-to-date printing machinery, and had an excellent rapport with the business and sporting people of the area. When he died, the papers remained in the family, with his sons Harry and Jack in charge of the Orroroo and Peterborough businesses respectively. In 1946, the newspaper absorbed the Jamestown Star and Farmer's Journal (23 July 1903 – 28 June 1946).

=== Extinction ===
In 1970, the Times, the Northern Review, and Orroroo Enterprise were merged to become the Review-Times, which shortly became defunct.

== Digitisation ==
The National Library of Australia has made digitised copies of all issues of the Petersburg Times (1887–1919) and The Times and Northern Advertiser (1919–1950), which can be accessed on-line through its Trove service.
