= Eyre Peninsula Tribune =

- Type: Weekly newspaper
- Owner: Australian Community Media
- Founder: Charles Wallace
- Founded: 1910
- Ceased publication: 2020
- Language: English
- City: Cleve, South Australia
- Website: eyretribune.com.au

The Eyre Peninsula Tribune was a weekly newspaper published in Cleve, South Australia, founded in late 1910 and published from March 1911 to April 9, 2020. From 1911 to 1950 it was titled Eyre's Peninsula Tribune, reflecting a time when South Australia's peninsulas were referred to using possessives (e.g. Yorke's Peninsula Advertiser). It was later sold to Rural Press, previously owned by Fairfax Media, but now an Australian media company trading as Australian Community Media.

== History ==
Eyre's Peninsula Tribune was founded in December 1910, with the first issue released on 10 March 1911. The newspaper was founded in Cowell by Charles Wallace, and after his death in 1912 it was managed by George Wallace, and in 1920 it was sold to E.R. Main. In 1941, during wartime rationing, it subsumed the Kimba Dispatch (2 September 1927 - 9 May 1941), which had been founded as a subsidiary by Main. On Thursday 15 May 1941, a subtitle (with which is incorporated the Kimba "Dispatch.") was added, but in January 1951, the title was simplified to Eyre Peninsula Tribune.

After Main's death in 1959, the Tribune was taken over by the Port Lincoln Times, who also owned the Areas Express (1959–1960), combining the two under the Tribune title. In 1963, R.C. Braund of the Port Lincoln Times assumed sole control the newspaper, and In 1982 it was taken over by Northern Newspapers Pty Ltd (winning the Ampol Award for the best country newspaper in Australia, with a circulation of under 5,000 the same year). In 1991 it became owned by the New South Wales based Rural Press, formerly a part of Fairfax Media.

In late 2018, Fairfax Media merged with Nine Network, who then on-sold the newspaper, along with many other state and nationwide titles, to Tony Catalano, rebranding as Australian Community Media. Port Lincoln Times and West Coast Sentinel were also purchased at this time. Restructures within the company stood down the Port Lincoln Times Editor, who oversaw editing for the Tribune.

Initially citing a two-week Easter break, the Tribune printed its last copy on 9 April 2020. Following in-company talks about the developing COVID-19 crisis, ACM later stood-down several non-daily newspapers indefinitely, along with several journalists. In early 2021, it was decided to officially cease publication of the Tribune, along with several other smaller rural publications in South Australia, and many websites were subsequently shut down. ACM has never made an official statement in regards to this.

Following the cessation, the District Council of Cleve began talks with several independent publishers, and committed advertising funds to get a new newspaper started. Several surrounding councils followed suit and a new publication, Eyre Peninsula Advocate, distributed its first edition in September 2021. It is run by Papers and Publications.

== Distribution ==
Its distribution included Cleve, Arno Bay, Butler, Cowell, Darke Peak, Elbow Hill, Kimba, Koppoio, Lock, Midgee, Port Neil, Rudall, Tumby Bay, Ungarra, Verrar, Wharminda, Yallunda Flat, and it was the oldest continually published newspaper serving the Eyre Peninsula region.

== Digitisation ==
Australian National Library carries images and text versions of the newspaper from 1911 to 1950, accessible using Trove, the on-line newspaper retrieval service, under the spelling Eyre's Peninsula Tribune.
