= Farm Weekly =

Western Australian agricultural newspaper

- Categories: Agriculture
- Frequency: Weekly
- Publisher: Australian Community Media
- Founded: 1974
- Country: Australia
- Based in: South Perth, Western Australia
- Language: Australian English
- Website: www.farmweekly.com.au
- ISSN: 1321-7526

Farm Weekly is a newspaper published by Australian Community Media. Founded in 1974 as Elders Weekly, it was renamed Farm Weekly in 1993. It focuses on the agriculture industry in Western Australia. It was published by Fairfax Media until sold to Australian Community Media in 2019.
