= Holly Hills, Virginia =

Unincorporated community in Virginia, US

Coordinates: 37.50570°N 77.75611°W

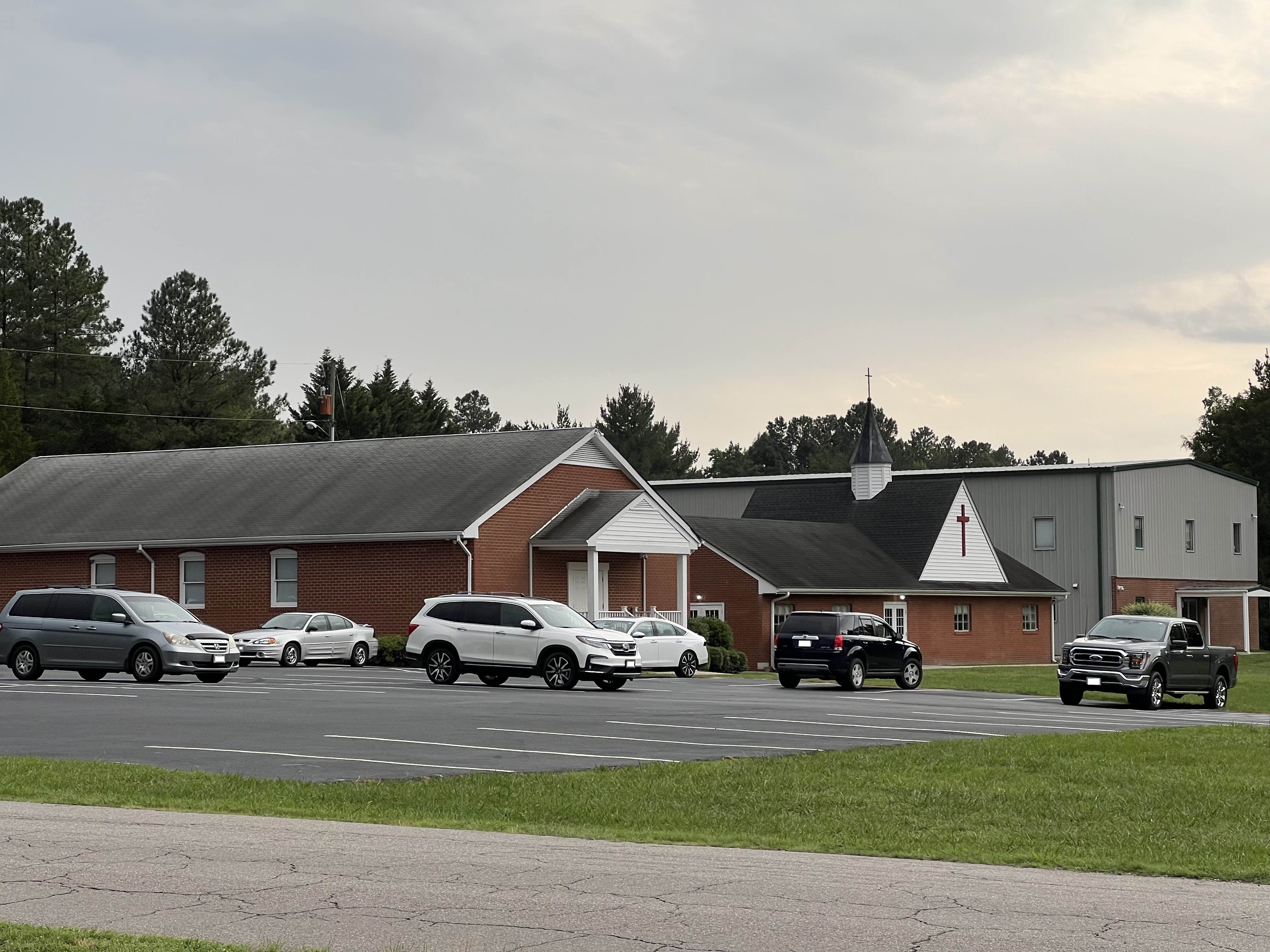
Holly Hills Baptist Church.

Holly Hills is an unincorporated community in Powhatan County, in the U.S. state of Virginia.
