= Messenger Newspapers =

Newspaper publisher

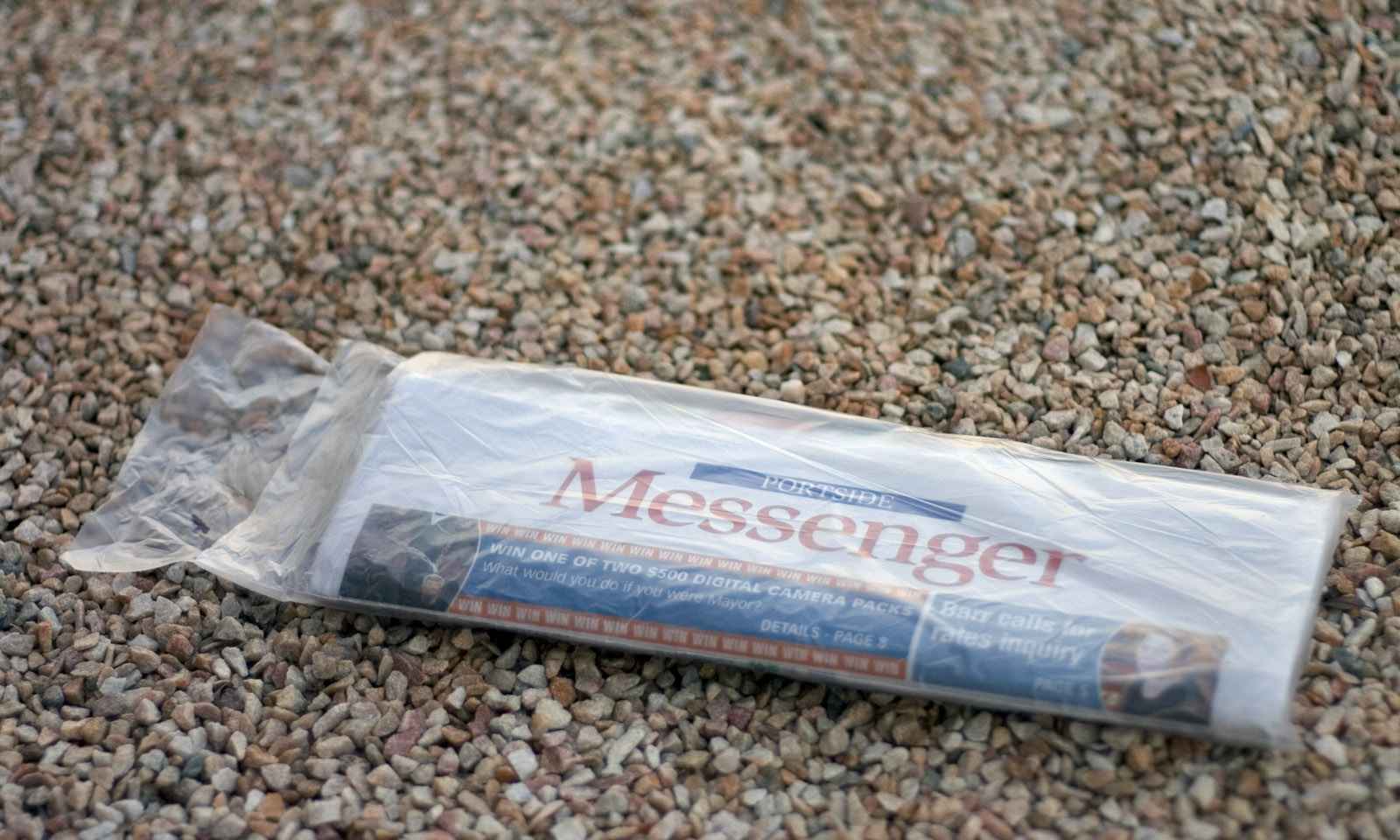
A copy of the Messenger.

Messenger Newspapers is the publisher of 9 free suburban weekly newspapers together covering the Adelaide metropolitan area in South Australia. Established by Roger Baynes in Port Adelaide in 1951, Messenger has since acquired other independent suburban titles to become Adelaide's only suburban newspaper group. The paper is a subsidiary of News Limited and is affiliated with The Adelaide Advertiser. The Messenger is delivered weekly to 9 different suburban areas, each paper targeting content to its distribution area with some shared content.

The newspapers cover events in the distribution area, including local council decisions, controversial developments, local social trends, articles about local volunteers or young people, and local sports clubs. There is an editorial and "letters to the editor" page, as well as significant classifieds and real estate sections. All Messenger titles feature regular sections such as lifestyle, Vibe (entertainment guide), Sport, and Your Garden.

In mid-2009, Messenger Newspapers moved from its headquarters at 1 Baynes Place, Port Adelaide to new offices at Sir Keith Murdoch House, 31 Waymouth St, Adelaide. The Adelaide Advertiser, Sunday Mail and various other News Ltd publications are also based in Sir Keith Murdoch House.

In 2016, News Corp SA announced changes to content and distribution of some of its titles, including renaming several mastheads, followed by additional changes in 2017, including mergers of several mastheads. In May 2020, as a result of issues related to the coronavirus, several News publications (Messenger South Plus; Messenger East Plus, Messenger North, Messenger West, Messenger City, Adelaide Hills, and Upper Spencer Gulf) became digital only.

== History ==
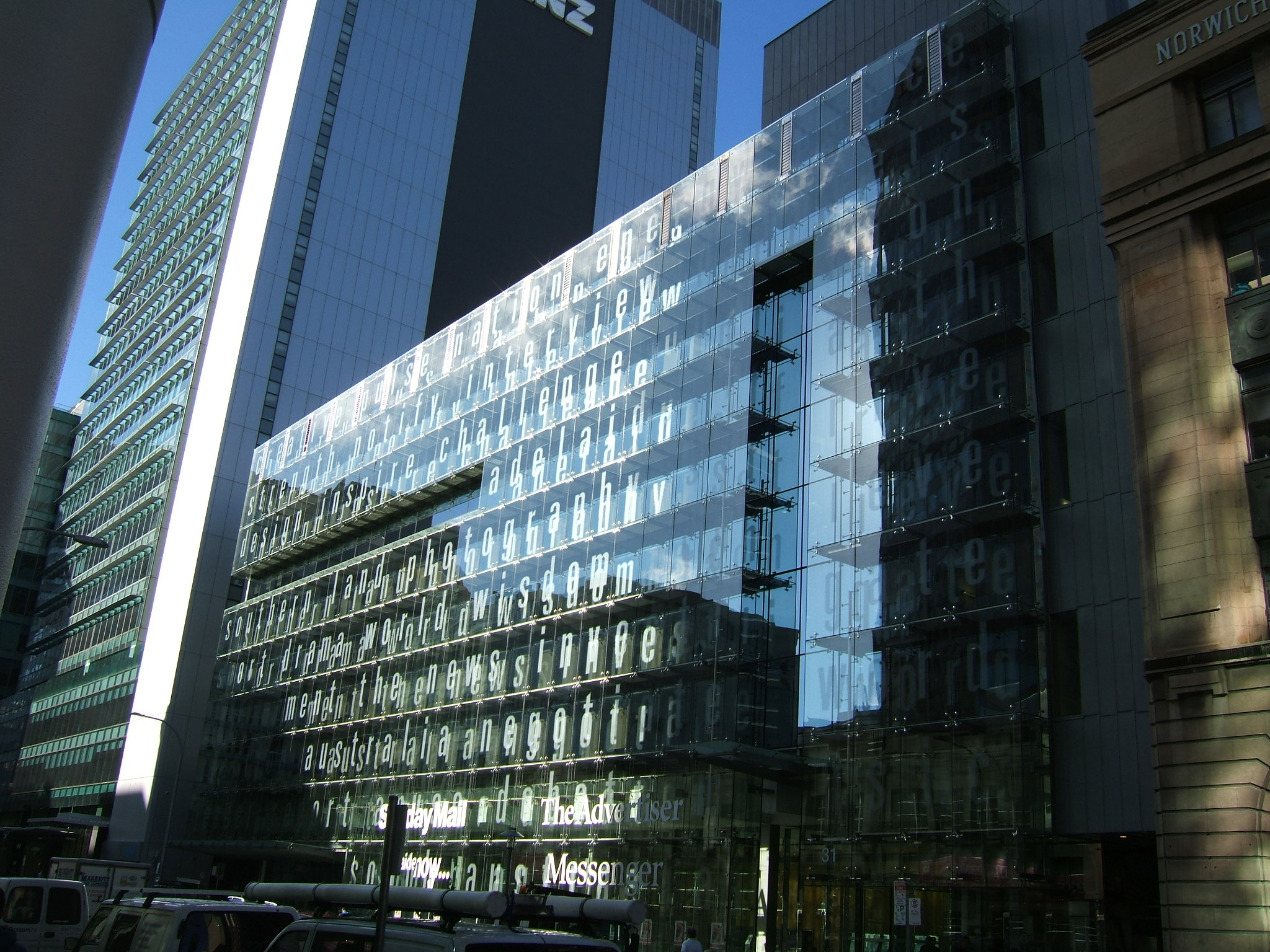
The office of the Messenger group of newspapers in Waymouth St, Adelaide

In 1951, Port Adelaide courier Roger Baynes, in partnership with Len Croker, took over the Largs North Progressive Association's Progressive Times. In March 1951, the Progressive Times was relaunched as the Messenger. The Messenger originally operated out of a small room above a Port Adelaide bicycle shop. The business later moved to an old butcher's shop on Commercial Road, Port Adelaide.

In 1954, Croker left the Messenger to run the Woodville Times. In 1959, Baynes' fellow courier, Ron Mitchell, joined Messenger to run its newest acquisition, the Standard. Messenger Press continued to acquire suburban newspapers across Adelaide and turned them into Messenger titles. Messenger Press acquired John Carroll's four News Review titles, the Edwardstown District Community Centre Newspaper and the Glenelg Guardian, previously run by the Smedley brothers at Glenelg.

By 1962, Messenger Newspapers were being delivered to 250,000 homes across Adelaide. Two years later, Baynes sold nearly half of the company's shares to The Advertiser. In 1983, shortly before his death, Baynes sold his remaining shares to The Advertiser.

In the 1970s and 1980s, newspapers in the Adelaide Hills, south coast and Barossa Valley were added to the Messenger stable. In 1988, the City Messenger was established to cover the Adelaide CBD.

Messenger had several printing firsts, most notably, in 1968, being the first newspaper in the southern hemisphere to own a web offset press - just one year after being the first press to use IBM tape electric typesetting. In 1981, the firm purchased a Mitsubishi L600 colour press, enabling Messenger to print coloured magazines including The Advertiser Magazine, Football Times, South Australian Radio TV Extra and Adelaide Matters. However, from 1988, production moved to The Advertiser. From 1991, all Messenger newspapers were printed by News Limited.

In 2007, Messenger Newspapers began publishing news online and uploaded web videos for the first time. In January 2008, Messenger added a number of online interactive features to its websites, including photo galleries and a breaking news feed from Adelaide Now, the online news service of The Advertiser newspaper.

In October 2009, Messenger Community News re-launched The City Messenger, featuring a new look, improved design and new weekly features, such as the 60 Second News Tour - a quick snapshot of stories across Messenger's 11 titles. Also in October, Messenger relaunched a new look Standard Messenger under the new name City North Messenger. The newly launched publication now takes in North Adelaide, which was previously covered by The City Messenger. The City North was launched with a new emphasis on increased coverage of news, sport and lifestyle content. The Standard Messenger website was rebadged www.citynorthmessenger.com.au to reflect the changes.

In October 2016, News Corp SA announced changes to several mastheads, renaming the Weekly Times Messenger to the Westside Weekly, the Portside Messenger to the Portside Weekly, and the Guardian Messenger to the CoastCity Weekly. The distribution area for the Eastern Courier would be expanded to include Mitcham, Blackwood and Belair. Adelaide Matters would be included as a new section in the other mastheads, and no longer be a stand-alone publication.

In July 2017, additional changes were announced, including the merger of the Leader Messenger and East Torrens Messenger to form the "Northeastern Weekly", and the City North with the City Messenger.

== Local editions ==
Title	Region	Delivery day	Circulation	Readership
News Review	Salisbury, Elizabeth and Gawler	Wednesday	92,000	96,016
Northeastern Weekly	Modbury and Golden Grove	Wednesday	56,000	43,674
Westside Weekly	Woodville, West Lakes, West Beach	Wednesday	65,000	66,461
Portside Weekly	Port Adelaide and Lefevre Peninsula	Wednesday	55,000	33,187
City	Adelaide	Thursday	35,000	19,702
East Torrens	Payneham, Athelstone, Magill	Wednesday	43,000	35,243
Hills & Valley	Aberfoyle Park	Wednesday	29,000	19,597
City North Messenger	Prospect, North Adelaide, Walkerville and Enfield	Wednesday	48,000	38,043
Eastern Courier	Norwood, Burnside, Goodwood, Mitcham, Blackwood, Belair	Wednesday	86,000	62,673
CoastCity Weekly	Glenelg, Marion, Hallett Cove	Wednesday	75,000	71,252
Southern Times	Reynella, Noarlunga, Sellicks Beach	Wednesday	88,000	60,088
Adelaide Matters	Adelaide	Monthly	106,347	127,000

== See also ==
- List of newspapers in Australia
