= The Transcontinental =

- Type: Weekly newspaper
- Owner: Star News Group
- Founder: James Clarence Barclay
- Founded: 1914
- Language: English
- City: Port Augusta, South Australia
- Website: transcontinental.com.au

The Transcontinental is a weekly newspaper published in Port Augusta, South Australia which dates from October 1914. Formerly owned by Rural Press and Australian Community Media, since 2022 it has been owned by the Star News Group.

== History ==
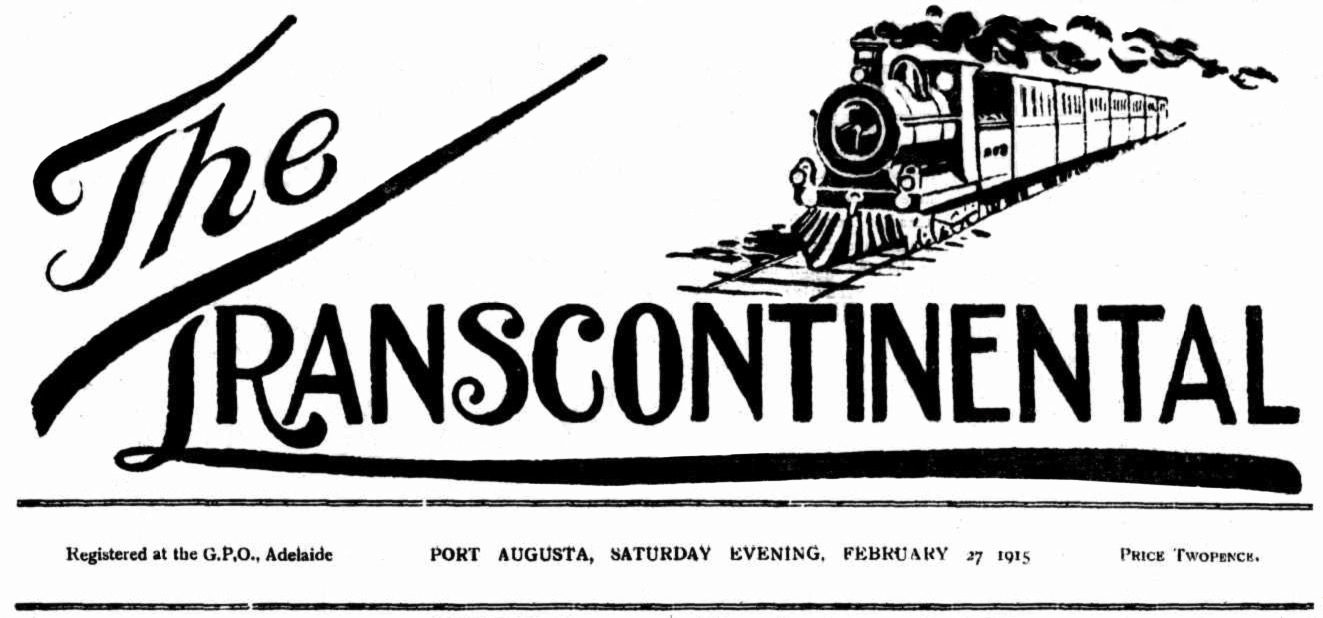
Masthead (nameplate) of The Transcontinental in 1915

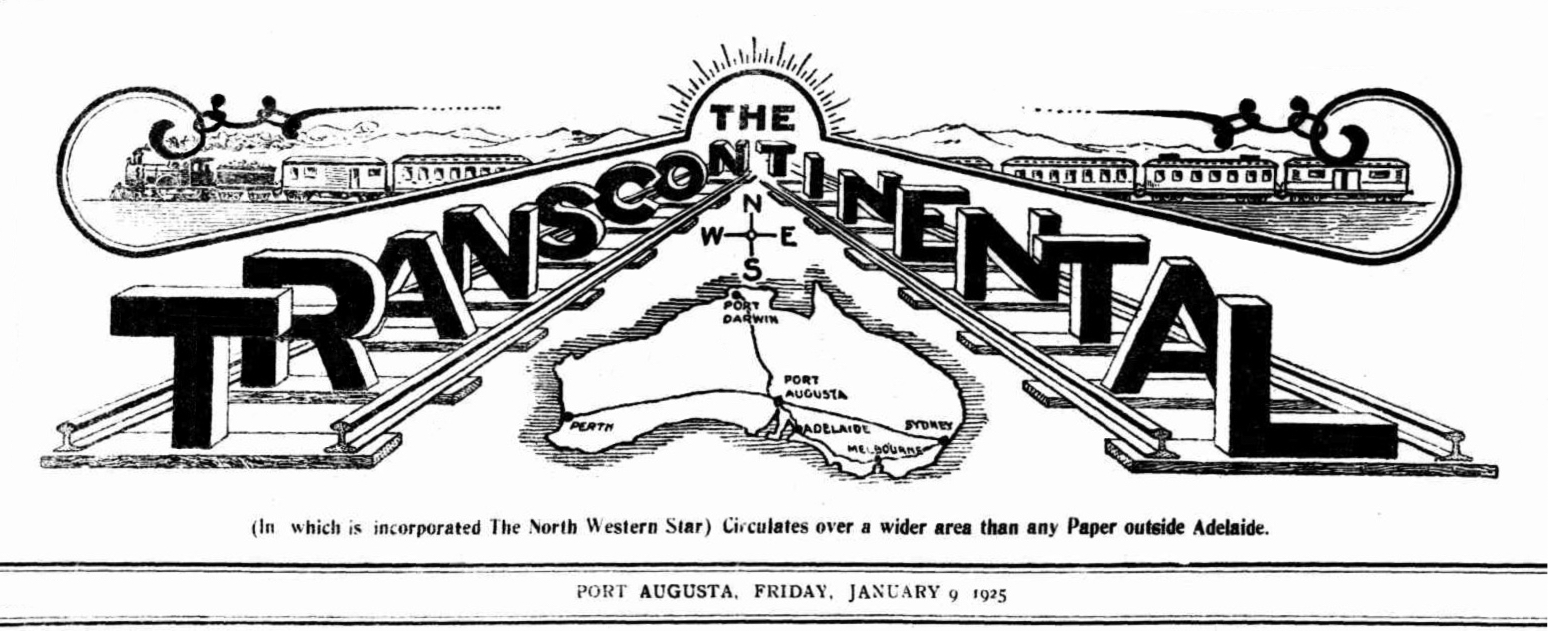
Masthead of The Transcontinental in 1925

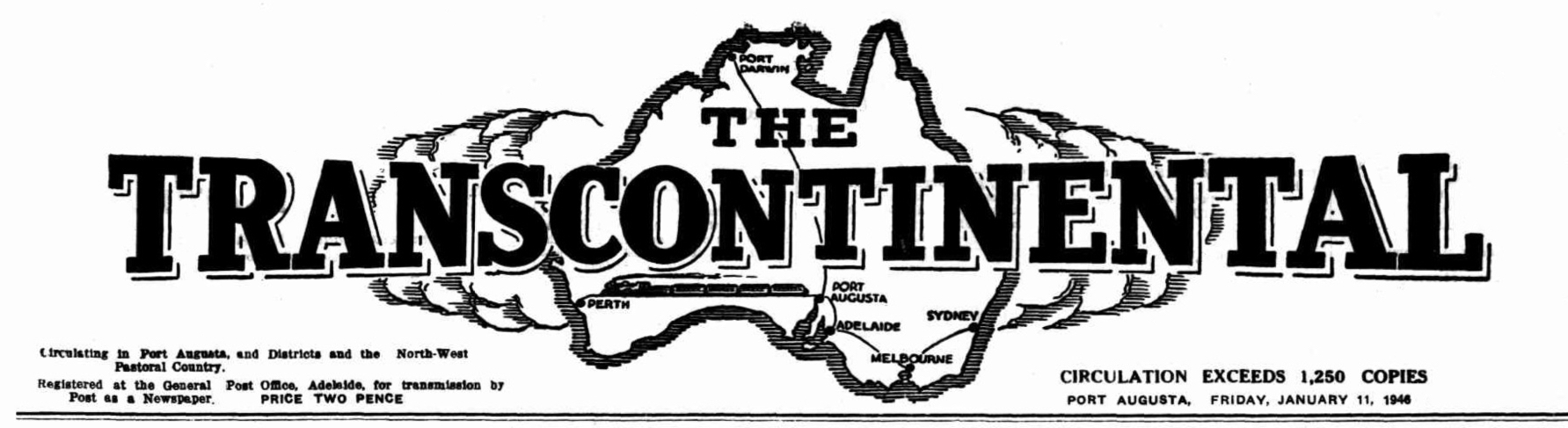
Masthead of The Transcontinental in 1946

The Transcontinental was founded by James Clarence Barclay (1873–before 1929), editor, who with his wife Agnes Fleming Barclay, née Johnstone (1877–1946), were owners and operators of the North Western Star (or North Western Star and Frome Journal) published in Wilmington from 1912 to at least 1916. Agnes Barclay, and perhaps James Barclay, moved to Brisbane, Queensland, where their daughter Dulcie Elma Barclay was crowned "Miss Queensland" by Smith's Weekly in 1926. In 1929, at age 20, she took her own life after being abandoned by her boyfriend. Mrs Barclay was later involved in the death of a man from caustic soda burns received at her home on Hope Street, South Brisbane.

The newspaper was first published on 7 November 1914, and subtitled "The Only Federal Newspaper in the Commonwealth.", reflecting the view that the paper will "work for the development of the north, and for amelioration of the conditions of the workers." From Vol. 1, No.3, the proprietor was John Ernest Edwards (died 1955), previously on the literary staff of The Advertiser and editor was Maurice Henry Hill (died 1957). Lindsay Riches was editor from 1927.

Another newspaper, the North Western Star and Frome Journal (30 August 1912 – 27 July 1917), a sister publication in Wilmington with mirrored content and also run by Barclay, was stopped and replaced by the main publication. In 1945, the newspaper took control of the Quorn Mercury (3 May 1895 – 11 October 1956), and after 1956, it continued by replacing the Quorn column in The Transcontinental.

In 2007, the paper, acquired earlier by Rural Press, was among the stable of publications in a merger between Rural Press and John Fairfax & Sons. Papers from Rural Press were then published under the Fairfax Regional Media brand, which later became Australian Community Media. In December 2022 it was sold to the Star News Group.

== Distribution ==
Like other SA Today publications, the newspaper is available locally in print and by subscription online.

== Digitisation ==
The National Library of Australia has digitised photographic copies of most issues of The Transcontinental from 7 November 1914 (Vol. 1 No.3) to 8 June 1951, which may be accessed via Trove.
