= Alex Waislitz =

Australian businessman (born 1958)

- Born: 16 February 1958 (age 68); Melbourne, Victoria, Australia
- Education: Monash University
- Occupation: Investor
- Organizations: Thorney Investment Group (Founder and CEO); Collingwood Football Club (Vice-President); View Media Group (Founder)
- Spouse: Heloise Pratt (m. 1994; sep. 2015)
- Partner: Rebekah Behbahani (since 2017)
- Children: 4
- Family: Richard Pratt (1934–2009) (father-in-law); Anthony Pratt (brother-in-law)

Alex Waislitz OAM (born 1958) is an Australian investor.

Waislitz was elected to the Collingwood Football Club Board of Directors in 1998, elected as vice-president in 2009, and has provided philanthropic support to the club.

== Early life and education ==
Waislitz was born to a Jewish family. Both his Warsaw-born father, David (1922-2009), and his mother were immigrants from Poland. He graduated from Monash University in 1979 with a Bachelor of Laws and Commerce.

== Career ==
Waislitz has been a member of several Boards of directors. He is director of various Pratt Group and Visy companies. In 1991 he founded Thorney Investment Group and served as inaugural executive director until 2009. Thorney invests in public securities, private companies and property, and has close connection to the Pratt family investments. Thorney specialises in emerging companies across a broad range of industries including manufacturing, technology, mining services and resources. Waislitz has served as a Director of Collingwood Football Club since 1998 and as Vice President of the Club since 2009.

He is also a member of the International Advisory Board for Master of Business Administration (MBA) at Ben-Gurion University School of Management.

In June 2023, Waislitz was awarded a Medal (OAM) of the Order of Australia in the General Division for "service to the community through a range of organisations".

Waislitz is also a movie producer; and has produced movies such as Hotel de Love & Joey.

== Personal life ==
In 1994 Waislitz married Heloise Pratt, daughter of businessman Richard Pratt and his wife, Jeanne. They had three children, Jacob Waislitz, Amelia Waislitz and Joseph Waislitz. Waislitz and his wife separated in 2015. In November 2020, Waislitz announced his engagement to Rebekah Behbahani. They have one child, Storm Waislitz.

=== Net worth ===
Year	Financial Review Rich List		Forbes Australia's 50 Richest	
Year	Rank	Net worth (A$)	Rank	Net worth (US$)
2017		$1.24 billion	not listed	
2018	54	$1.39 billion ▲	not listed	
2019	56 ▼	$1.56 billion ▲	not listed	
2020	65 ▼	$1.49 billion ▼		
2021	77 ▼	$1.50 billion ▲		
2022	82 ▼	$1.51 billion ▲		
2023	101 ▼	$1.41 billion ▼		
2024		$1.50 billion ▲		
2025	115	$1.55 billion ▲		

Legend
Icon	Description
Steady	Has not changed from the previous year
▲	Has increased from the previous year
▼	Has decreased from the previous year
