= Lithgow Mercury =

Lithgow Mercury, front page, 7 January 1898

The Lithgow Mercury, is a tri-weekly English language newspaper first published in 1878 in Lithgow, New South Wales, Australia.

== History ==
The Lithgow Mercury was established in 1878. Initially a weekly publication, the paper was published daily from 1949 to 1986, then tri-weekly. In 1879, the paper was purchased by Walter Scott Targett, who had started work as a compositor on the paper, and who was later elected to the New South Wales Legislative Assembly as the Member for Hartley. J.P.T. Caulfield acquired the paper in 1886. He worked as editor for eighteen months, until late 1887 when he sold the paper to the proprietors of the Lithgow Enterprise and Australian Land Nationaliser. In January 1889, the Lithgow Mercury Newspaper Co., headed by James Ryan, purchased the business and property of the Lithgow Enterprise. Ryan became managing editor of the paper, a position he held for over 37 years. In July 1926, Western Newspapers Ltd, led by L.T. Watson, Hubert Browett Whitham and F.V. Sparrow, purchased the plant and book debts of the paper. The Lithgow Mercury is currently owned by Fairfax Regional Media.

== Digitisation ==
The paper has been partially digitised as part of the Australian Newspapers Digitisation Program of the National Library of Australia.

== See also ==
- List of newspapers in New South Wales
