= The Port Macquarie News and Hastings River Advocate =

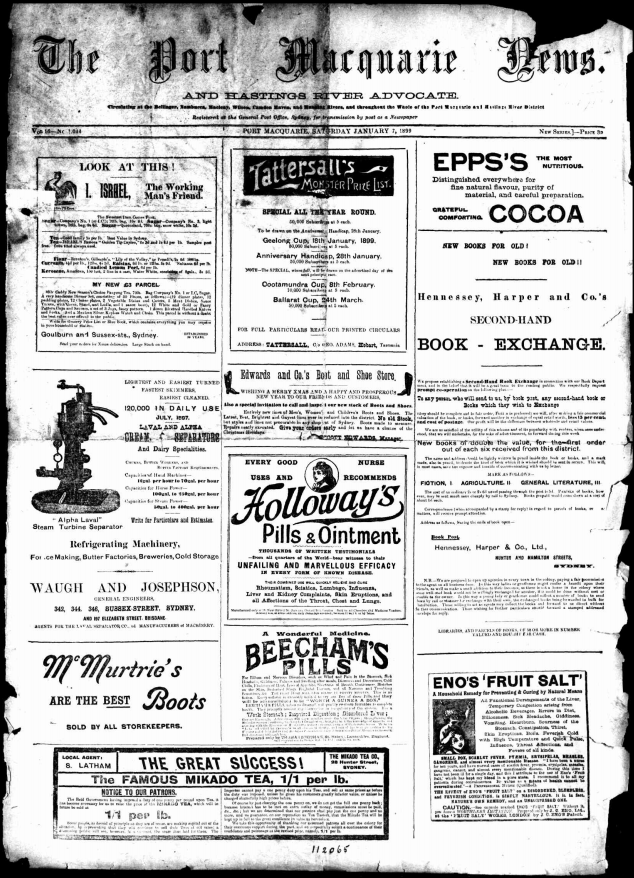
The Port Macquarie News and Hastings River Advocate, 7 January 1899

The Port Macquarie News and Hastings River Advocate was a weekly English language newspaper published in Port Macquarie, New South Wales, Australia.

== History ==
First printed and published on 8 July 1882 by Alfred Edward Pountney, it was published from 1882 to 1950. The paper was circulated in the Bellinger, Nambucca, Macleay, Wilson, Camden Haven, and Manning Rivers, and throughout the whole of the Port Macquarie and Hastings River district.

== Digitisation ==
The paper has been digitised as part of the Australian Newspapers Digitisation Program of the National Library of Australia.

== See also ==
- List of newspapers in Australia
- List of newspapers in New South Wales
