= The Flinders News =

Weekly newspaper published in South Australia

- Type: Weekly newspaper
- Owner: Australian Community Media
- Founded: 1876 (as Northern Mail)
- Language: English
- City: Port Pirie, South Australia
- Website: theflindersnews.com.au

The Flinders News is a weekly newspaper published in Port Pirie, South Australia, formed from the historic mergers of multiple Mid-North publications and representing a combined ancestry of 12 former publications. Its earliest constituent publication, the Northern Mail, was first issued on 30 June 1876, and the newspaper has been published under its current title since 1989. It was later sold to Rural Press, previously owned by Fairfax Media, but now an Australian media company trading as Australian Community Media.

== History ==
The Flinders News originated with the historical mergers of several struggling mid-northern newspapers in 1948, 1970, and 1977:

=== Northern Review ===
The Northern Review was created in 1948 by the merger of:

- Areas' Express (and Farmers Journal) (1877–1948)
- Agriculturist and Review (1881–1948) - formerly known as Jamestown Review (1878–1881)
- Laura Standard and Crystal Brook Courier (1917–1948) - which itself was a 1917 merger of:
  - Laura Standard (and Beetaloo, Wirrabara, Melrose, Booleroo Centre and Yarrowie Advertiser) (1889–1917)
  - Crystal Brook Times (1910–1917)

=== Review-Times ===
The Review-Times was created in 1970 by the merger of:

- Northern Review (1948–1970)
- Times and Northern Advertiser (1919–1970) - formerly known as Petersburg Times (1887–1919)
- Orroroo Enterprise, (1892–1970) - a continuation of Terowie Enterprise (1884–1891), which was formerly the British Australian Federal Standard and the North-Eastern Times (1884), and the North Eastern Times and Terowie News (1881–1882)

=== Review-Times-Record ===
The Review-Times-Record was created in 1977 by the merger of:

- Review-Times (1970–1977) - during this time, an Adelaide version, called Review-Times: City edition (1972–1973), was also briefly published
- Burra Record (1878–1977) - formerly known as Northern Mail (1876–1877), Burra News and Northern Mail (1877–1878), and Record (1878).

In 1989, the title of the Review-Times-Record was changed to its current title, The Flinders News. It was part of the Fairfax Media group.

== Distribution ==
The Flinders News is distributed throughout the mid-north region of South Australia, northern Yorke Peninsula, the Far North, Port Pirie, and Port Augusta, and had a claimed readership of 24,000. Like other Rural Press publications the newspaper is also available online.

== Awards ==
Recently, the Flinders News won an award at the nationwide Fairfax Regional Media Awards for best co-op as well as placing runner-up in best feature and sales team of the year.

== Digitisation ==
Australian National Library carries images and text versions of the newspaper from 1911 to 1950, accessible using Trove, the on-line newspaper retrieval service.
