= Barossa and Light Herald =

Weekly newspaper in South Australia

- Founded: 1863; 162 years ago
- Ceased publication: April 8, 2024
- City: Tanunda, South Australia

The Herald (also styled as Barossa Herald, Barossa and Light Herald, or Barossa & Light Herald) was a weekly newspaper published in Tanunda, South Australia. With its earliest beginnings in 1860, it has been published under the Herald banner since 2005. It was later sold to Rural Press, previously owned by Fairfax Media, later an Australian media company trading as Australian Community Media. The Herald appeared to cease on 8 April 2020.

== History ==
The Barossa and Light Herald began publication on 10 May 1951 after Leslie Tilbrook (who had owned the Kapunda Herald since September 1923) sold the newspaper. A new publication was then created by the merger of:

1. Kapunda Herald (1860-1951): This publication began life as the Northern Star (1860-1863), the first English-language newspaper in regional South Australia. It then transformed into the Kapunda Herald and Northern Intelligencer (1864-1877) when it changed ownership. By 1878, and with another new owner, the title was simplified.
2. Barossa News (1908-1951): The first newspaper to provide any significant local news coverage to the Barossa towns, the Barossa News, was established by John Birdseye Cant, a Western Australian printer and newspaperman. Initially just 500 copies were printed, but after a few years the circulation had risen to 2,500.

In 1981, the newspaper then absorbed the Eudunda Courier (9 February 1922 – 15 April 1981). The newspaper was later taken over by the Rural Press in the 1990s and was a part of the Fairfax Media group. In May 2005 the title was again shortened, this time to simply Herald, though the longer variants of the previous name (Barossa Herald, Barossa and Light Herald, or Barossa & Light Herald) are commonly used as well.

The Herald appeared to cease on 8 April 2020, with a note of not being published on 15 April due to Easter, however further issues are not apparent. However, there has been some coverage of potentially syndicated articles attached to this title, during 2021 in other databases such as NewsBank.

== Distribution ==
In 2012, the Herald claimed the largest circulation for a country newspaper in South Australia at 21,400 copies distributed weekly. By 2018, the average issue readership for the print version was calculated to be 29,000 Like other Rural Press publications, during its life dates, the newspaper was then available online.

== Format availability ==
- The State Library of South Australia carries this title on microfilm reels spanning May 1951-December 1966 and January 1989-April 2005.
- Selected full editions and lift-outs are available on Isuu from 21 October 2010 up to 4 September 2012.
- More recent editions are available in Australian national, state and territory libraries through National edeposit, as listed by the National Library of Australia.
- Selected issues are available through NewsBank.
