= The Recorder (Port Pirie) =

Australian weekly newspaper

- Type: Weekly newspaper
- Owner: Australian Community Media
- Founder(s): Alfred Edward South and Charles Meyrick
- Founded: 21 March 1885; 140 years ago
- Language: English
- City: Port Pirie, South Australia
- Country: Australia
- Website: portpirierecorder.com.au

The Recorder is a newspaper published in Port Pirie, South Australia since 1885. Formed by an amalgamation in 1898, it was also previously known as Port Pirie Recorder and North Western Mail between 1898 and 1918, and as The Recorder from 1919. It was later sold to Rural Press, previously owned by Fairfax Media, but now an Australian media company trading as Australian Community Media.

The Recorder is published once a week, Thursday, and is part of the Australian Community Media (ACN) network. Like other ACN publications, the newspaper is also available online.

== History ==
The town, later city, of Port Pirie had two newspapers, The Port Pirie Advocate and Areas News, published weekly from 21 March 1885, (later simplified to The Port Pirie Advocate (1895-1898)), and The Port Pirie Standard and Barrier Advertiser, published weekly from 4 January 1889. They amalgamated to form The Port Pirie Recorder and North Western Mail, first published on 9 July 1898, appearing on Saturday and Wednesday mornings, printed and published jointly by Alfred Edward South (1861 – 1 January 1934) of the Advocate, and Charles Meyrick (died 3 January 1937) of the Standard. Their office was on Alexander Street, Port Pirie.

Meyrick withdrew from the partnership around 1903 and on 6 April 1914 the paper became a daily. In January 1918, the newspaper was simplified to The Port Pirie Recorder, and in January 1919, South sold the paper to James Edward Davidson and it was simplified again to The Recorder. A few months later, a fire caused considerable damage to its Ellen Street premises, but with help from a local jobbing printer publication continued, albeit in a more modest form. Davidson went on to found News Limited, with The Recorder one of its stable, which included Adelaide's The News, The Barrier Miner (Broken Hill) and Perth's Daily News.

On 1 December 1931 the paper was sold to Horace Yelland (died 27 August 1948) (previously editor of The News and The Sunday Mail) and his company Recorder Proprietary Limited. On 14 August 1934 disaster once again struck when much of Port Pirie, The Recorder's premises included, was inundated by flood. Again, publication was reduced to a single sheet but four days later had returned to full size with graphic photos and descriptions of the episode.

For many years, The Recorder's chief competitor was the Port Pirie Advertiser (1898–1924), published by Samuel W. Osborne. After that paper ceased publication, Osborne contributed a weekly column "Personal Reminiscences" to The Recorder, which continued until 1950, a few years before his death.

The paper's worst disaster struck on 22 January 1941 when Pirie's Central Mission was destroyed by fire, which spread to the Recorder's offices causing immense damage. The paper went to three issues per week, Monday, Wednesday and Friday, which continued to at least 1955.
