= Peterborough, South Australia =

Peterborough formerly Petersburg
- Town
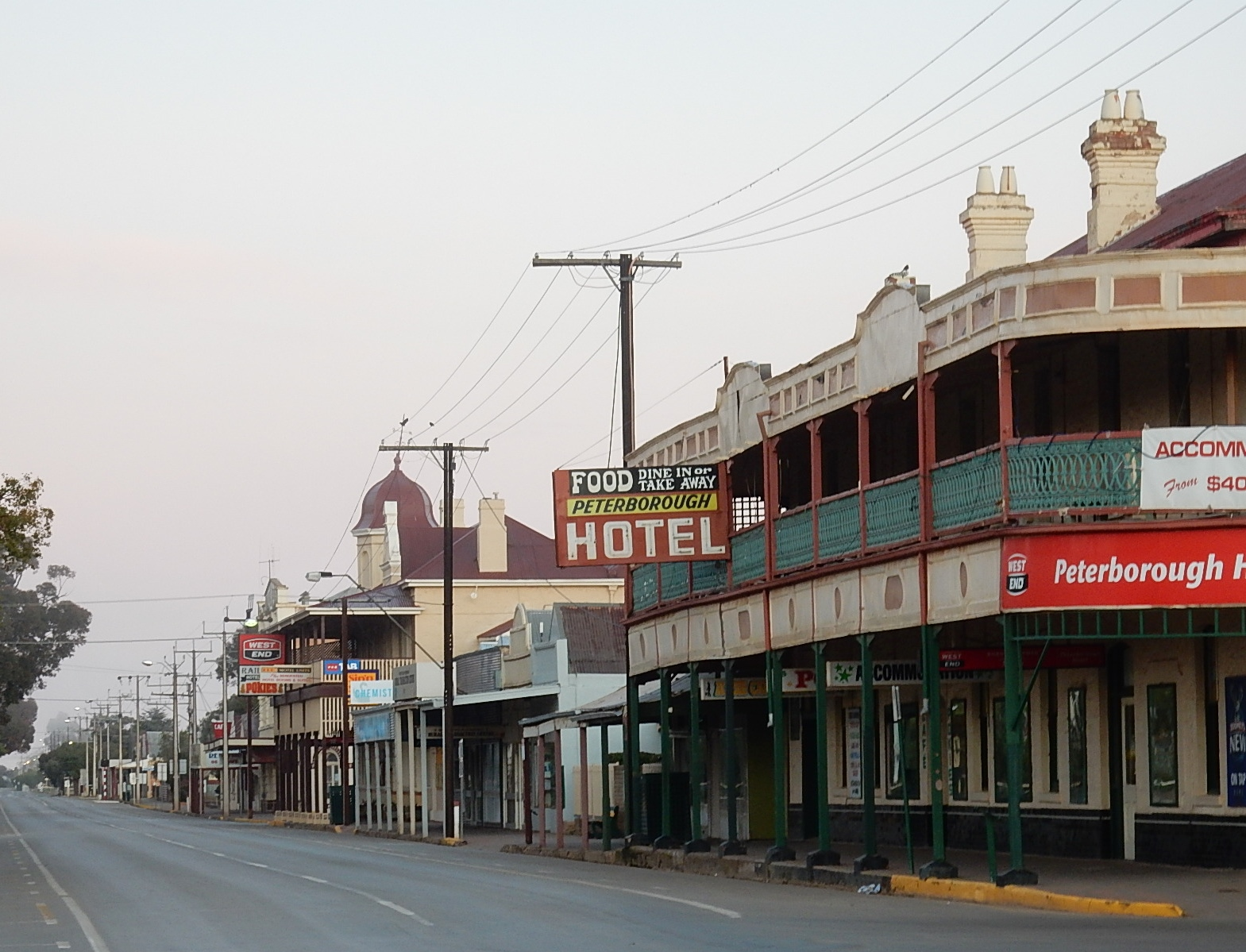
- Main street of Peterborough

- Coordinates: 32°58′S 138°50′E
- Country: Australia
- State: South Australia
- LGA: District Council of Peterborough
- Location: 220 km (140 mi) N of Adelaide; 113 km (70 mi) SE of Port Augusta
- Established: 1869

Government
  - State electorate: Stuart
  - Federal division: Division of Grey
- Elevation: 420 m (1,380 ft)

Population
  - Total: 1,428 (UCL 2021)
- Postcode: 5422
- Website: Peterborough
Localities around Peterborough
Minvalara	Minvalara	Ucolta
Sunnybrae	Peterborough	Ucolta
Sunnybrae	Sunnybrae	Ucolta

Peterborough is a town in the mid north of South Australia, in wheat country, just off the Barrier Highway. It was originally named Petersburg (German: [ˈpeːtɐsˌbʊʁk]) after the landowner, Peter Doecke, who sold land to create the town. It was one of 69 places in South Australia renamed in 1917 due to anti-German sentiments during World War I.

== History ==
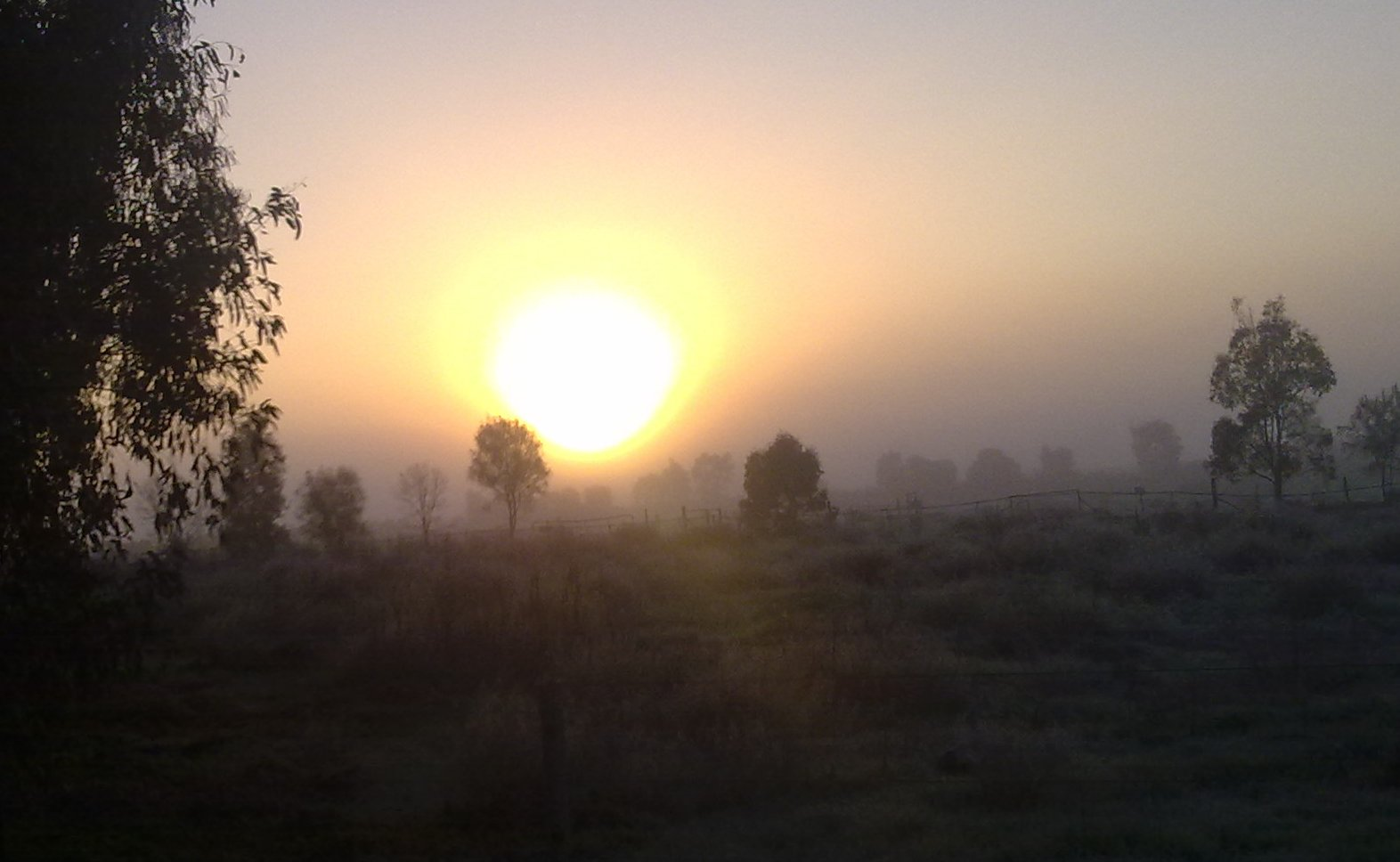
Winter sunrise in Peterborough

The first European settlers in the area purchased land from the government in 1875. The first building in the town was constructed four years later. Settler Peter Doecke transferred his land to J H Koch in 1876, who found out in 1880 that the land would be the site of a railway junction. He subdivided it and sold 33 acres (13 ha) for £1700, after failing to get £500 per acre for it in 1879.

By 1880 a hotel and post office had been erected, followed by a school in 1883, and a town hall in 1884.

At the prompting of mayor W. Thredgold, a newspaper, the Petersburg Times was founded in 1887 by Robert M. Osborne, became The Times and Northern Advertiser in 1919, under the longterm proprietorship of W. H. Bennett and survived as a family business until 1970.

=== Heritage listings ===
Peterborough has a number of heritage-listed sites, including:

- 14 Bourke Street: Koch House
- 2 Callary Street: Bishop's Palace and Convent, Peterborough
- 2 Jervois Street: Peterborough Police Station, Cells and Courthouse
- 77-79 Kitchener Street: Peterborough Power Station
- Main Street: Peterborough Rotunda
- 105-107 Main Street: General Store, Peterborough
- 106 Main Street Peterborough YMCA Hostel
- 108 Main Street: Peterborough Town Hall
- 193-195 Main Street: Peterborough Hotel
- 227-231 Main Street: Capitol Theatre, Peterborough
- Railway Terrace: Peterborough Roundhouse and Turntable
- Tripney Avenue: Peterborough Gold Battery and Office

Historical population
Year	Pop.	±%
1921	2,189	—
1933	3,059	+39.7%
1947	2,890	−5.5%
1954	3,473	+20.2%
1961	3,430	−1.2%
1966	3,117	−9.1%
1971	3,023	−3.0%
1976	2,760	−8.7%
1981	2,575	−6.7%
1986	2,236	−13.2%
1991	2,138	−4.4%
1996	1,855	−13.2%
2001	1,679	−9.5%
2006	1,689	+0.6%
2011	1,486	−12.0%
2016	1,416	−4.7%
2021	1,428	+0.8%
Source: Australian Bureau of Statistics data.

== Government ==
Peterborough is the seat of the District Council of Peterborough, and is the largest town in the council area. It is in the state electorate of Stuart and federal Division of Grey.

Peterborough once had its own town council, the Corporation of the Town of Peterborough. surrounded by the district council.

== Railways ==
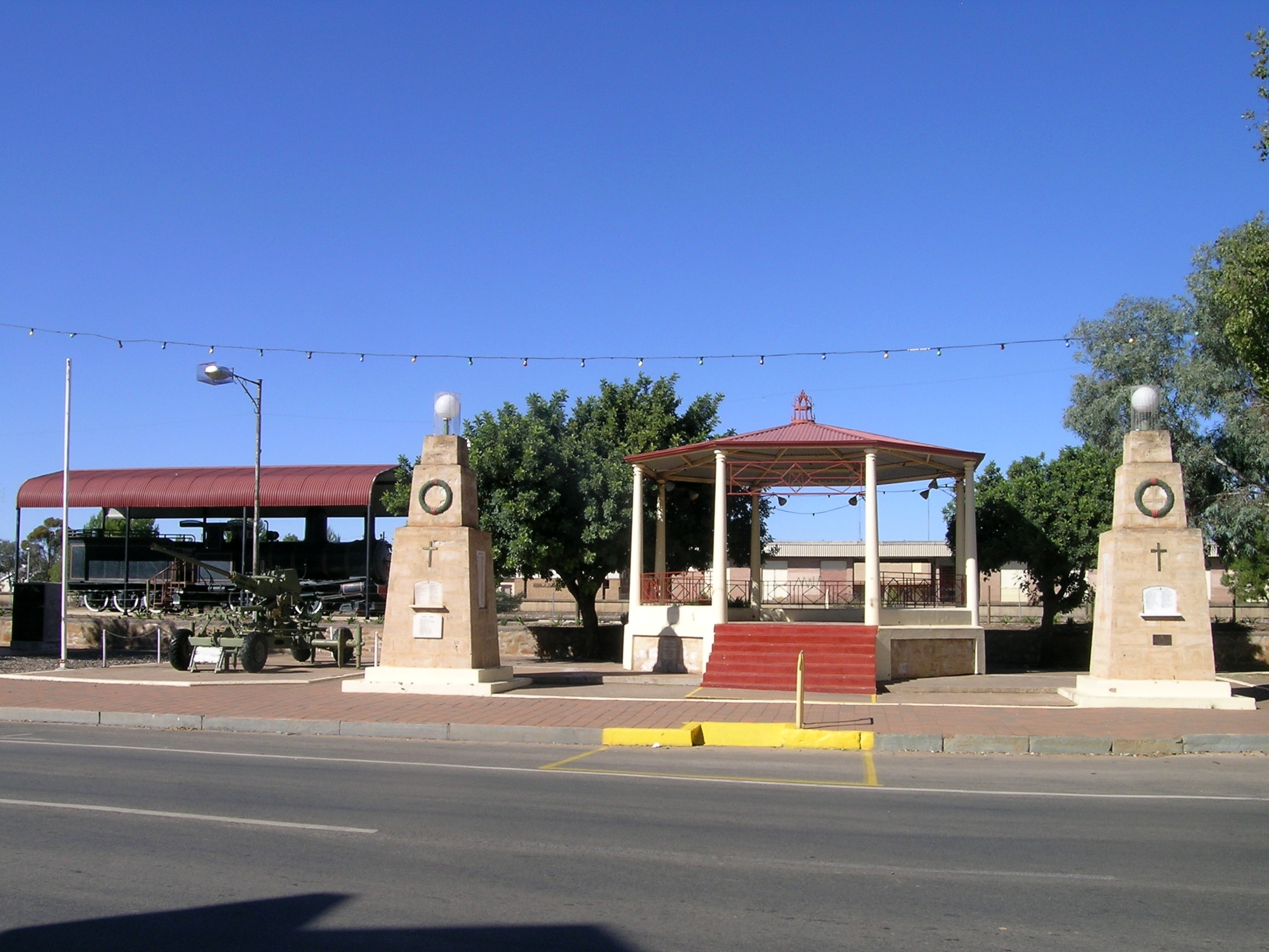
Former South Australian Railways narrow-gauge locomotive, "Y" class no. 82, alongside the rotunda and war memorials in the main street of Peterborough

Peterborough sat on the intersection of the East-West railway linking Port Pirie and Broken Hill, and the North–South railway linking Adelaide eventually to Alice Springs via Quorn, both narrow gauge (1,067 mm (3 ft 6 in)) lines between 1917 (when the Trans-Australian Railway opened across the Nullarbor Plain) and 1937 (when a more direct south–north route bypassed the Peterborough–Quorn railway line by connecting Port Pirie to Port Augusta). The Peterborough railway station is still in operation and was formerly a stop for the weekly Indian Pacific train.

The line from Port Pirie and Jamestown arrived in 1881, followed shortly after by the line from Terowie in the south and north to Quorn. The line to Broken Hill was completed in 1887.

Peterborough was the home town for Bob the Railway Dog, who is remembered by a bronze statue located in the Main Street.

In 1970, the east–west line was converted to standard gauge (1435 mm (4 ft 8 1/2 in)), and the line south of Peterborough to Terowie to broad gauge (1600 mm / 5 ft 3 in). Thus Peterborough became one of two triple-gauge railway junctions in Australia – the other being Gladstone, in the same railway corridor.

The broad-gauge connection to Adelaide, via Burra, was closed on 26 July 1988. The narrow-gauge line north to Quorn carried freight until 1980, and was removed between Eurelia and Bruce in the mid-1980s. Grain trains ran as far as Orroroo into the mid-1980s. In its later years, until 2002, the line was used by tourist trains from Steamtown Peterborough as far as Eurelia.

== Museums ==
Steamtown ceased operations in 2002; however, the roundhouse continued to be used to display its coaches and locomotives. The District Council, with funding from the three tiers of government and recovery of the Eurelia line, subsequently established the Steamtown Heritage Rail Centre. As of August 2025 the Steamtown Heritage Rail Centre and Peterborough Visitor Centre are closed owing to the District Council's financial position.

The historic Radium Hill mine site near Olary is now closed to the public, but the Radium Hill Museum was relocated to the rear of the Peterborough Steamtown Heritage Centre.

== Nova Systems Space Precinct ==
In early 2022, the Nova Systems Space Precinct was officially established on a 21 ha (52-acre) site located just outside of Peterborough. Australian defence engineering and technology group Nova Systems originally purchased the site in 2019, when it contained one ground station terminal belonging to the site's previous owner, Tyvak. The site now hosts several ground stations on behalf of Tyvak (US), RBC Signals (US), and Leaf Space (Italy). Up to 75 more satellite dishes are planned, each with 16 antennae.

== Media ==
The town was home to the Petersburg Times, subtitled: Orroroo Chronicle and Northern Advertiser, (12 August 1887 – May 1919). The Times' subtitle later evolved to Terowie, Yongala, and Northern Advertiser, and finally Northern Advertiser. In 1919, the overall name was changed to The Times and Northern Advertiser, Peterborough, South Australia, in response to the government's wish to remove Germanic placenames.

Peterborough was also home to the short-lived newspaper, Petersburg Enterprise and Northern Advocate (20 January – 2 August 1912), which was printed by William John Myers and Walter A. Wade. Another short-lived publication was Frith's Bulletin (15 April 1913), a monthly magazine published by F.H. Frith, but discontinued after only one issue. A third one at this time was the Sporting Telegraph (3 May – 26 July 1913), which was printed by W.H. Bennett for Pritchard Morgan Hall.

More recently, it was also home to the Peterborough Times (2003–2006), which later became part of the Mid North Broadcaster, a publication released from 2006 to 2013 in Burra. The Broadcaster was formed by the merger of struggling local newspapers, the Peterborough Times, the Burra Broadcaster (1991–2006), and the Eudunda Observer. It was owned by the Taylor group, with editorial control via the Murray Pioneer. Its distribution included the towns of Burra, Eudunda, Jamestown, and Peterborough.

In mid-2021, a Temporary Community Broadcasting Licence (TCBL) was issued by the Australian Communications and Media Authority (ACMA) to Peterborough Community Broadcasting Incorporated. In early 2022, 5PBS commenced broadcasting on 91.1 MHz, servicing Peterborough and surrounding towns including Oodla Wirra, Terowie and Yongala.

== Education ==
Peterborough High School was opened in 1927 and caters for students from years 7 to 12.

Peterborough Primary School was opened in 1883 and caters for students from years reception to 6

St Joseph's School is a reception to Year 7 Catholic primary school which was founded by Mary MacKillop and the Sisters of St Joseph.
