= Australian Community Media =

Australian regional newspaper publisher and media company

- Formerly: Rural Press
- Industry: Media
- Headquarters: Sydney, Australia
- Area served: Regional Australia
- Products: Regional newspapers Websites
- Owner: Antony Catalano (50%); Alex Waislitz (50%)
- Website: acm.media

Australian Community Media (ACM) is a media company in Australia responsible for over 160 regional publications. Its mastheads include the Canberra Times, Newcastle Herald, The Examiner, The Border Mail, The Courier and the Illawarra Mercury along with more than one hundred community-based websites across Australia and numerous agricultural publications including The Land and Queensland Country Life.

The entity was formerly owned by Fairfax Media prior to its merger with Nine Entertainment in 2018. In April 2019, Nine sold the business to former chief executive of real estate platform Domain Antony Catalano and billionaire Alex Waislitz.

In May 2024, one of the lawyers employed by ACM became associated with a plagiarism scandal involving the use of AI. It was discovered that articles from other publications had been rewritten, but not attributed to the original journalists.

== History ==
ACM's origins can be traced back to The Land, founded in Sydney in 1911. In subsequent decades, The Land acquired various other community newspapers. In September 1970, John Fairfax acquired a 25% shareholding. In 1981, the company was renamed Rural Press. In 1985, John Fairfax increased its shareholding from 25% to 45%. In March 1989, Rural Press was listed on the Australian Securities Exchange with Fairfax Holdings having a 51% shareholding.

By the mid-2000s, Rural Press owned approximately 170 newspaper and magazine titles, the Canberra Times being the most prominent. These were predominantly in rural Australia, though it also owned a number of agricultural publications in the United States and New Zealand. It also owned radio stations in regional Queensland, South Australia and Western Australia, a range of Australian classified advertising websites, and Australian commercial printing plants.

On 6 December 2006, it was announced that Rural Press and John Fairfax would merge to form a new company estimated in value at $12 billion. Under the deal, the family company of Rural Press chairman John B. Fairfax (who did not have an interest in the company bearing his family's name) took a 13.5 per cent stake in the merged entity. This was just short of a controlling interest, but gave Fairfax a potential blocking stake if Publishing & Broadcasting Limited, News Corporation, the Seven Network or a private equity raider embarked on a hostile takeover, as had been widely anticipated following the Federal Parliament's passage of new media laws on October 18, 2006.

The merger with Fairfax was completed on 8 May 2007. Papers from Rural Press were published under the Fairfax Regional Media brand, which later became Australian Community Media. Fairfax Media merged with Nine Entertainment in December 2018 and Nine sold ACM to Antony Catalano and Alex Waislitz in April 2019.

In December 2022, management of 14 newspapers in Queensland and South Australia was taken over by Star News Group. ACM closed the Blayney Chronicle and Oberon Review in August 2024 and then a month later announced plans to close another eight papers. The company blamed the closures on Meta Platforms not renewing its $200 million three-year deal with local newspaper publishers. In February 2025, ACM announced that all of its mastheads would move to one printed edition per week by 2032.

== Plagiarism ==
An investigation by Australian Broadcasting Corporation's Media Watch revealed several thousand instances of media plagiarism, described as parasitic content farms, originating from sites such as League Initiative, F1 Initiative, Surf Initiative, and AliaVera. James Raptis, a senior in-house lawyer for ACM, was linked to the cases. His name was listed as the author in the byline of an F1 Initiative site. It was uncovered that he was a director of FlyLearner, which shares an office with AliaVera. On 10 May 2024, Raptis issued a statement admitting to hosting the sites but denying any editorial involvement. The sites were taken down, and Raptis left his position with Australian Community Media.

== CEO ==
Antony Catalano has been placed on leave as CEO due to allegations of serious assault offences involving his wife. Tony Kendall will continue as the day-to-day Managing Director.

== Newspapers ==
=== Regional Daily ===
==== New South Wales ====
- Illawarra Mercury (Wollongong)
- The Newcastle Herald (Newcastle)
- The Daily Advertiser (Wagga Wagga)
- The Northern Daily Leader (Tamworth)

==== ACT ====
- The Canberra Times (Canberra)

==== Tasmania ====
- The Advocate (Burnie) (Devonport)
- The Examiner (Launceston)

==== Victoria ====
- Bendigo Advertiser (Bendigo)
- The Border Mail (Albury-Wodonga)
- The Courier (Ballarat)
- The Standard (Warrnambool)

=== Non-daily ===
==== New South Wales and the Australian Capital Territory ====
===== ACT and Southern Inland NSW =====
- Goulburn Post
- Southern Highland News (Bowral)

===== Illawarra and South East NSW =====
- Bay Post-Moruya Examiner (Batemans Bay and Moruya)
- Bega District News
- South Coast Register (Nowra)

===== New England =====
- The Armidale Express

===== Newcastle and Hunter region =====
- Port Stephens Examiner
- Maitland Mercury
- The Singleton Argus

===== North Coast NSW =====
- Great Lakes Advocate (Forster)
- Guardian News (Nambucca)
- Manning River Times (Taree)
- Port Macquarie News (Port Macquarie)
- The Macleay Argus (Kempsey)

===== South West NSW =====
- The Area News (Griffith)
- The Irrigator (Leeton)

===== Suburban Sydney =====
- St George & Sutherland Shire Leader

===== Western NSW =====
- Blue Mountains Gazette (Katoomba)
- Central Western Daily (Orange)
- Daily Liberal (Dubbo)
- Lithgow Mercury
- Mudgee Guardian and Gulgong Advertiser
- Western Advocate (Bathurst)
- ACM Rural Events

==== Queensland ====
- The North West Star (Mount Isa)

==== Northern Territory ====
- The Katherine Times

==== Tasmania ====
- The Sunday Examiner (Launceston)

=== Agricultural ===
==== Rural Weeklies ====
- The Land
- Queensland Country Life
- Farm Weekly
- Stock & Land
- Stock Journal
- North Queensland Register
- AgTrader

==== Specialty Publications ====
- Alfa Lotfeeding
- Australian Cotton & Grains Outlook
- Good Fruit & Vegetables
- Horse Deals
- The Australian Dairy Farmer

=== Specialty brands ===
==== Targeted brands ====
- The Senior
- Focus
- Rural Bookshop
- The Content Studio
- Chi Squared Research

==== Rural newspaper inserted publications ====
- Country Leader
- Hunter Valley and North Coast Town & Country
- North West Magazine
- The Rural
- The Border News
- Town and Country Magazine
- Western Magazine
