= Electoral results for the district of Tumut =

Election results for Tumut, New South Wales, Australia

Tumut, an electoral district of the Legislative Assembly in the Australian state of New South Wales, was created in 1859 and abolished in 1904.

Election	Member	Party
1859	George Lang	None
May 1860 by	Daniel Deniehy (Note: Daniel Deniehy was declared elected at the by-election in May 1860, however he was also elected at the East Macquarie by-election held on the same day and his election to Tumut was subsequently declared void by the Elections and Qualifications Committee. He took his seat as the member for East Macquarie and doesn't appear in the records kept by the Legislative assembly as a member for Tumut.)	None
Nov 1860 by	Charles Cowper, Jr.	None
1860	Charles Cowper, Jr.	None
1861 by	Charles Cowper, Jr.	None
1863 by	James Martin	None
1864	Charles Cowper, Jr.	None
1866 by	Edward Brown	None
1869	Edward Brown	None
1872	James Hoskins	None
1875	James Hoskins	None
1877	James Hoskins	None
1880	James Hoskins	None
1882 by	Thomas O'Mara	None
1882	Thomas O'Mara	None
1885	Travers Jones	None
1887	Travers Jones	Protectionist
1889	Travers Jones	Protectionist
1891	Edward Brown	Free Trade
1894	Travers Jones	Protectionist
1895	Travers Jones	Protectionist
1898	Robert Donaldson	Independent
1901	Robert Donaldson	Progressive

== Election results ==
=== Elections in the 1900s ===
==== 1901 ====
1901 New South Wales state election: Tumut
Party	Candidate	Votes	%	±%
Progressive	Robert Donaldson	1,127	57.3	+23.6
Labour	James Elphick	740	37.6	+5.6
Liberal Reform	Charles Royle	100	5.1	
Total formal votes		1,967	99.4	+2.5
Informal votes		11	0.6	−2.5
Turnout		1,978	73.8	+1.4
Member changed to Progressive from Independent				

=== Elections in the 1890s ===
==== 1898 ====
1898 New South Wales colonial election: Tumut
Party	Candidate	Votes	%	±%
Independent	Robert Donaldson	530	33.7	
Labour	Robert Joyce	503	32.0	
National Federal	Travers Jones	222	14.1	
Independent Federalist	John Keenan	179	11.4	
Independent Federalist	Daniel O'Brien	139	8.8	
Total formal votes		1,573	97.0	
Informal votes		49	3.0	
Turnout		1,622	72.4	
Independent gain from National Federal				

==== 1895 ====
1895 New South Wales colonial election: Tumut
Party	Candidate	Votes	%	±%
Protectionist	Travers Jones	469	35.6	
Free Trade	John Channon	469	35.6	
Ind. Free Trade	Nathaniel Emanuel	208	15.8	
Ind. Protectionist	Robert Newman	170	12.9	
Total formal votes		1,316	98.6	
Informal votes		19	1.4	
Turnout		1,335	74.7	
Protectionist hold				

As this was a tied result, the returning officer had a casting vote and chose Travers Jones. The Elections and Qualifications Committee conducted a recount with the results as follows.

1895 Tumut re-count
Party	Candidate	Votes	%	±%
Protectionist	Travers Jones	476	36.3	
Free Trade	John Channon	461	35.1	
Ind. Free Trade	Nathaniel Emanuel	204	15.5	
Ind. Protectionist	Robert Newman	172	13.1	
Total formal votes		1,313	97.9	
Informal votes		28	2.1	
Turnout		1,341	75.0	
Protectionist hold				

==== 1894 ====
1894 New South Wales colonial election: Tumut
Party	Candidate	Votes	%	±%
Protectionist	Travers Jones	616	44.8	
Free Trade	Edward Brown	332	24.2	
Independent Labour	Robert Joyce	236	17.2	
Ind. Protectionist	John Downing	153	11.1	
Ind. Protectionist	John Cheney	37	2.7	
Total formal votes		1,374	97.9	
Informal votes		29	2.1	
Turnout		1,403	77.1	
Protectionist gain from Free Trade				

==== 1891 ====
1891 New South Wales colonial election: Tumut Wednesday 24 June
Party	Candidate	Votes	%	±%
Free Trade	Edward Brown (elected)	654	53.0	
Protectionist	Travers Jones (defeated)	581	47.0	
Total formal votes		1,235	98.3	
Informal votes		22	1.8	
Turnout		1,257	68.4	
Free Trade gain from Protectionist				

=== Elections in the 1880s ===
==== 1889 ====
1889 New South Wales colonial election: Tumut Saturday 2 February
Party	Candidate	Votes	%	±%
Protectionist	Travers Jones (elected)	692	58.9	
Free Trade	Walter Vivian	482	41.1	
Total formal votes		1,174	98.2	
Informal votes		21	1.8	
Turnout		1,195	67.6	
Protectionist hold				

==== 1887 ====
1887 New South Wales colonial election: Tumut Saturday 19 February
Party	Candidate	Votes	%	±%
Protectionist	Travers Jones (re-elected)	662	52.2	
Free Trade	Nathaniel Emanuel	607	47.8	
Total formal votes		1,269	98.0	
Informal votes		26	2.0	
Turnout		1,295	74.3	

==== 1885 ====
1885 New South Wales colonial election: Tumut Friday 30 October
Candidate	Votes	%
Travers Jones (elected)	446	36.9
Nathaniel Emanuel	438	36.2
James Hoskins	326	26.9
Total formal votes	1,210	98.8
Informal votes	15	1.2
Turnout	1,233	66.9

The sitting member Thomas O'Mara unsuccessfully contested Monaro.

==== 1882 ====
1882 New South Wales colonial election: Tumut Saturday 9 December
Candidate	Votes	%
Thomas O'Mara (re-elected)	602	53.8
Arthur Renwick	517	46.2
Total formal votes	1,119	98.6
Informal votes	16	1.4
Turnout	1,135	61.2

Arthur Renwick had previously unsuccessfully contested East Sydney.

==== 1882 by-election ====
1882 The Tumut by-election Tuesday 17 October
Candidate	Votes	%
Thomas O'Mara (elected)	527	50.8
Solomon Emanuel	299	28.8
Charles Bardwell	212	20.4
Total formal votes	1,038	100.0
Informal votes	0	0.0
Turnout	1,038	56.0

James Hoskins resigned.

==== 1880 ====
1880 New South Wales colonial election: Tumut Saturday 20 November
Candidate	Votes	%
James Hoskins (re-elected)	564	51.0
William Spicer	542	49.0
Total formal votes	1,106	98.8
Informal votes	13	1.2
Turnout	1,119	58.0
	(new seat)	

=== Elections in the 1870s ===
==== 1877 ====
1877 New South Wales colonial election: The Tumut Monday 5 November
Candidate	Votes	%
James Hoskins (re-elected)	557	60.6
Sir John Robertson	362	39.4
Total formal votes	919	100.0
Informal votes	0	0.0
Turnout	937	42.4

==== 1875 ====
1874–75 New South Wales colonial election: The Tumut Saturday 2 January 1875
Candidate	Votes	%
James Hoskins (re-elected)	590	68.5
Thomas O'Mara	272	31.6
Total formal votes	862	98.3
Informal votes	15	1.7
Turnout	877	44.6

==== 1872 ====
1872 New South Wales colonial election: The Tumut Wednesday 21 February
Candidate	Votes	%
James Hoskins (re-elected)	564	67.5
Edward Brown (defeated)	272	32.5
Total formal votes	836	100.0
Informal votes	0	0.0
Turnout	836	51.6

=== Elections in the 1860s ===
==== 1869 ====
1869–70 New South Wales colonial election: The Tumut Wednesday 22 December 1869
Candidate	Votes	%
Edward Brown (re-elected)	513	61.4
Robert Lynch	321	38.4
J T V Walker	2	0.2
Total formal votes	836	100.0
Informal votes	0	0.0
Turnout	836	68.2

==== 1866 by-election ====
1866 The Tumut by-election Monday 20 August
Candidate	Votes	%
Edward Brown (elected)	286	51.9
George Thornton	265	48.1
Total formal votes	551	100.0
Informal votes	0	0.0
Turnout	551	43.5

Charles Cowper Jr. had been absent from parliament for an entire session and his seat was declared vacant.

==== 1864 ====
1864–65 New South Wales colonial election: The Tumut Saturday 10 December 1864
Candidate	Votes	%
Charles Cowper Jr. (re-elected)	414	54.4
James Martin	347	45.6
Total formal votes	761	100.0
Informal votes	0	0.0
Turnout	761	62.6

==== 1863 by-election ====
1863 The Tumut by-election Monday 16 November
Candidate	Votes	%
James Martin (elected)	393	72.2
C D O'Connell	151	27.8
Total formal votes	544	100.0
Informal votes	0	0.0
Turnout	544	54.0

Charles Cowper Jr. had resigned his seat to successfully challenge James Martin at the Orange by-election.

==== 1861 by-election ====
1861 The Tumut by-election Thursday 26 September
Candidate	Votes	%
Charles Cowper Jr. (re-elected)	324	66.5
Daniel Deniehy	163	33.5
Total formal votes	487	100.0
Informal votes	0	0.0
Turnout	487	51.2

Charles Cowper Jr. had been appointed Clerk of the Executive Council in the third Cowper ministry.

==== 1860 ====
1860 New South Wales colonial election: The Tumut Saturday 8 December
Candidate	Votes	%
Charles Cowper Jr. (re-elected)	unopposed	

==== November 1860 by-election ====
1860 The Tumut by-election Thursday 1 November
Candidate	Votes	%
Charles Cowper Jr. (elected)	show of hands	
John Egan		
Thomas Mate		

The by-election in May 1860 was overturned by the Election and Qualifications Committee due to voting irregularities. Daniel Deniehy had been elected at the East Macquarie by-election and decided to represent that seat.

==== May 1860 by-election ====
1860 The Tumut by-election Thursday 10 May
Candidate	Votes	%
Daniel Deniehy (elected)	172	55.3
John Egan	139	44.7
Total formal votes	311	100.0
Informal votes	0	0.0
Turnout	311	40.0

George Lang resigned. The by-election was overturned by the Election and Qualifications Committee due to voting irregularities.

=== Elections in the 1850s ===
==== 1859 ====
1859 New South Wales colonial election: The Tumut Thursday 30 June
Candidate	Votes	%
George Lang (elected)	259	53.3
John Egan	178	36.6
James Garland	49	10.1
Total formal votes	486	100.0
Informal votes	0	0.0
Turnout	486	62.5
