= November 1860 Tumut colonial by-election =

By-election in New South Wales, Australia

A by-election was held for the New South Wales Legislative Assembly electorate of The Tumut on 1 November 1860 because the by-election in May 1860 was declared void by the Election and Qualifications Committee. Daniel Deniehy was declared elected, however he was also elected at the East Macquarie by-election held on the same day. Deniehy took his seat as the member for East Macquarie and doesn't appear in the records kept by the Legislative Assembly as a member for Tumut.

== Dates ==
Date	Event
10 May 1860	Poll held in majority of electorate
4 June 1860	Poll held in Adelong
18 October 1860	Election and Qualifications Committee declared the by-election to be void.
18 October 1860	Writ of election issued by the Speaker of the Legislative Assembly.
1 November 1860	Nominations.
8 November 1860	Polling day
20 November 1860	Return of writ

== Result ==
1860 The Tumut by-election Thursday 1 November
Candidate	Votes	%
Charles Cowper Jr. (elected)	show of hands	
John Egan		
Thomas Mate		

== See also ==
- Electoral results for the district of Tumut
- List of New South Wales state by-elections
