= October 1863 West Sydney colonial by-election =

By-election in New South Wales, Australia

A by-election was held for the New South Wales Legislative Assembly electorate of West Sydney on 30 October 1863 because Geoffrey Eagar had been appointed Colonial Treasurer in the first Martin ministry. Such ministerial by-elections were usually uncontested and on this occasion, Peter Faucett (Yass), William Forster (East Sydney) and Arthur Holroyd (Parramatta) were unopposed. The other minister Bowie Wilson (Goldfields South) was easily re-elected, with more than 90% of the vote. James Martin had replaced Charles Cowper as Premier and Charles Cowper Jr. resigned his seat of The Tumut to challenge Martin at the Orange by-election. While defeated, Martin promptly returned to parliament, winning the by-election for The Tumut, the seat vacated by Charles Cowper Jr.

Jabex Bunting was a one time candidate. At the declaration of the Poll Eager attributed Bunting's opposition to personal animosity because of a dispute about a claim for expenses of £2 said to have been incurred in the election in January 1863.

== Dates ==
Date	Event
16 October 1863	Geoffrey Eagar appointed Colonial Treasurer.
20 October 1863	Writ of election issued by the Speaker of the Legislative Assembly.
29 October 1863	Nominations.
30 October 1863	Polling day
4 November 1863	Return of writ

== Result ==
October 1863 West Sydney by-election Friday 30 October
Candidate	Votes	%
Geoffrey Eagar (re-elected)	883	95.9
Jabez Bunting	38	4.1
Total formal votes	921	100.0
Informal votes	0	0.0
Turnout	921	12.9

== See also ==
- Electoral results for the district of West Sydney
- List of New South Wales state by-elections
