= Electoral results for the district of Wynyard =

Election results for Wynyard, New South Wales, Australia

Wynyard, an electoral district of the Legislative Assembly in the Australian state of New South Wales was created in 1904 and abolished in 1913.

Election	Member	Party
1904	Robert Donaldson	Progressive
1907	Robert Donaldson	Independent Liberal
1910	Robert Donaldson	Independent Liberal

== Election results ==
=== 1910 ===
1910 New South Wales state election: Wynyard
Party	Candidate	Votes	%	±%
Independent Liberal	Robert Donaldson	2,722	51.0	−6.8
Labour	Walter Boston	2,612	49.0	6.8
Total formal votes		5,334	98.4	+0.4
Informal votes		87	1.6	−0.4
Turnout		5,421	78.6	+0.7
Member changed to Independent Liberal from Progressive (defunct)				

=== 1907 ===
1907 New South Wales state election: Wynyard
Party	Candidate	Votes	%	±%
Former Progressive	Robert Donaldson	2,881	57.8	
Labour	Patrick Sullivan	2,100	42.2	
Total formal votes		4,981	98.0	
Informal votes		101	2.0	
Turnout		5,082	77.9	
Former Progressive hold				

=== 1904 ===
1904 New South Wales state election: Wynyard
Party	Candidate	Votes	%	±%
Progressive	Robert Donaldson	1,877	50.7	
Labour	William Johnson	1,265	34.2	
Liberal Reform	Robert Joyce	561	15.2	
Total formal votes		3,703	98.5	
Informal votes		56	1.5	
Turnout		3,759	58.9	
Progressive win		(new seat)		

Wynyard was a new seat, comprising all of the abolished seat of Tumut and part of the abolished seat of Gundagai. The member for Tumut was Robert Donaldson (Progressive) while the member for Gundagai was John Barnes (Progressive) who unsuccessfully contested Cootamundra.
