= 1861 Tumut colonial by-election =

By-election in New South Wales, Australia

A by-election was held for the New South Wales Legislative Assembly electorate of The Tumut on 26 September 1861 because Charles Cowper Jr., the son of then Premier Charles Cowper had been appointed Clerk of the Executive Council in the third Cowper ministry. Such ministerial by-elections were usually uncontested.

== Dates ==
| Date | Event |
|---|---|
| 1 September 1861 | Charles Cowper Jr appointed Clerk of the Executive Council. |
| 2 September 1861 | Writ of election issued by the Speaker of the Legislative Assembly. |
| 19 September 1861 | Nominations. |
| 26 September 1861 | Polling day |
| 10 October 1861 | Return of writ |

== Result ==
1861 The Tumut by-election Thursday 26 September
| Candidate | Votes | % |
|---|---|---|
| Charles Cowper Jr. (re-elected) | 324 | 66.5 |
| Daniel Deniehy | 163 | 33.5 |
| Total formal votes | 487 | 100.0 |
| Informal votes | 0 | 0.0 |
| Turnout | 487 | 51.2 |

== See also ==
- Electoral results for the district of Tumut
- List of New South Wales state by-elections
