= 1866 Tumut colonial by-election =

By-election in New South Wales, Australia

A by-election was held for the New South Wales Legislative Assembly electorate of The Tumut on 20 August 1866 because the seat of Charles Cowper Jr. had been declared vacant as he was absent from parliament for an entire session.

== Dates ==
Date	Event
25 July 1866	Seat of Charles Cowper Jr. declared vacant due to absence
26 July 1866	Writ of election issued by the Speaker of the Legislative Assembly.
13 August 1866	Nominations.
20 August 1866	Polling day
10 September 1866	Return of writ

== Candidates ==
- Edward Brown was a well-known local who had been a pastoralist in the Tumut region since 1846.
- George Thornton was a merchant from Sydney who had previously been the Mayor of Sydney and a member for East Sydney.

== Result ==
1866 The Tumut by-election Monday 20 August
Candidate	Votes	%
Edward Brown (elected)	286	51.9
George Thornton	265	48.1
Total formal votes	551	100.0
Informal votes	0	0.0
Turnout	551	43.5

== See also ==
- Electoral results for the district of Tumut
- List of New South Wales state by-elections
