= Martin ministry (1863–1865) =

First Martin ministry
- 8th Cabinet of the Colony of New South Wales

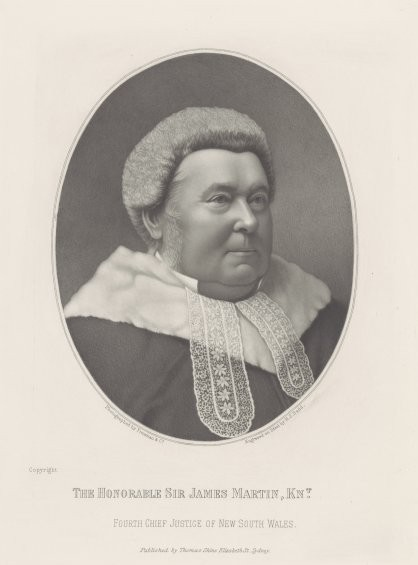
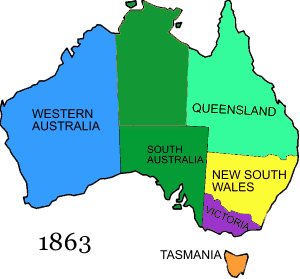
- Premier James Martin and the Colony of New South Wales (1863–1900)
- Date formed: 16 October 1863
- Date dissolved: 2 February 1865

People and organisations
- Monarch: Queen Victoria
- Governor: Sir John Young
- Head of government: James Martin
- No. of ministers: 7
- Member party: unaligned
- Status in legislature: Minority government
- Opposition party: unaligned
- Opposition leader: Charles Cowper

History
- Outgoing election: 1864–65
- Predecessor: Third Cowper ministry
- Successor: Fourth Cowper ministry

The first Martin ministry was the eighth ministry of the Colony of New South Wales, and first occasion of being led by James Martin QC.

Martin was elected in the first free elections for the New South Wales Legislative Assembly held in 1856. He came to power as Premier after Charles Cowper's government fell in October 1863.

The title of Premier was widely used to refer to the Leader of Government, but not enshrined in formal use until 1920.

There was no party system in New South Wales politics until 1887. Under the constitution, ministers were required to resign to recontest their seats in a by-election when appointed. Such ministerial by-elections were usually uncontested and on this occasion, Peter Faucett (Yass Plains), William Forster (East Sydney) and Arthur Holroyd (Parramatta) were unopposed. Two other ministers Geoffrey Eagar (West Sydney) and Bowie Wilson (Goldfields South), were easily re-elected, with more than 90% of the vote. Charles Cowper Jr. resigned his seat of The Tumut to challenge Martin at the Orange by-election. While defeated, Martin promptly returned to parliament, winning the by-election for The Tumut, the seat vacated by Charles Cowper Jr.

This ministry covers the period from 16 October 1863 until 2 February 1865, when Cowper retained government by defeating Martin at the 1864–65 general election.

== Composition of ministry ==
Portfolio	Minister	Term start	Term end	Term length
Premier; Attorney General	James Martin QC	16 October 1863	2 February 1865	1 year, 109 days
Colonial Secretary	William Forster	16 October 1863	2 February 1865	1 year, 109 days
Colonial Treasurer	Geoffrey Eagar	16 October 1863	2 February 1865	1 year, 109 days
Solicitor General	Peter Faucett	16 October 1863	2 February 1865	1 year, 109 days
Secretary for Lands	Bowie Wilson	16 October 1863	2 February 1865	1 year, 109 days
Secretary for Public Works	Arthur Holroyd	16 October 1863	2 February 1865	1 year, 109 days
Vice-President of the Executive Council; Representative of the Government in the Legislative Council	John Plunkett MLC	23 November 1863	2 February 1865	1 year, 71 days

Ministers are members of the Legislative Assembly unless otherwise noted.

== See also ==
- Self-government in New South Wales
- Members of the New South Wales Legislative Assembly, 1860–1864
- Members of the New South Wales Legislative Assembly, 1864–1869
- Second Martin ministry (1866–1868)
- Third Martin ministry (1870–1872)

Preceded by Third Cowper ministry	First Martin ministry 1863–1865	Succeeded by Fourth Cowper ministry
