= 1863 Goldfields South colonial by-election =

By-election in New South Wales, Australia

A by-election was held for the New South Wales Legislative Assembly electorate of Goldfields South on 16 November 1863 because Bowie Wilson had been appointed Secretary for Lands in the first Martin ministry. Such ministerial by-elections were usually uncontested and on this occasion, Peter Faucett (Yass), William Forster (East Sydney) and Arthur Holroyd (Parramatta) were unopposed. Of the other two contested elections, Geoffrey Eagar (West Sydney) was easily re-elected, with more than 90% of the vote, while James Martin was defeated at the Orange by-election. Martin promptly regained a seat in parliament by winning the by-election for The Tumut.

Frederick Cooper had been elected for Braidwood at the 1859 election, resigning in 1860, to accept an appointment as a sub-commissioner of goldfields. He was initially at Kiandra, however an inquiry had found he had committed errors, including illegal acts, as a result of his inexperience. Wilson, as member for Goldfields South, had been critical of the response of the then Secretary for Lands, John Robertson, in moving Cooper to Araluen rather than dismissing him. Cooper resigned as sub-commissioner shortly after Wilson had been appointed Secretary for Lands.

== Dates ==
Date	Event
16 October 1863	Bowie Wilson appointed Secretary for Lands.
22 October 1863	Writ of election issued by the Speaker of the Legislative Assembly.
5 November 1863	Nominations at Adelong.
16 November 1863	Polling day
26 November 1863	Return of writ

== Polling places ==
- Adelong district
- Adelong
- Middle Adelong
- North Gundagai
- Tumberumba
- Braidwood district
- Araluen
- Little River
- Major's Creek
- Mungarlow
- Burrangong district
- Young
- Seven Mile Rush (Note: Near Grenfell.)
- Wombat
- Twelve Mile Rush (Note: Near Lambing Flat.)
- Other
- Kiandra
- Gulf Creek

== Result ==
1863 Goldfields South by-election Monday 16 November
Candidate	Votes	%
Bowie Wilson (elected)	921	91.3
Frederick Cooper	88	8.7
Total formal votes	1,009	100.0
Informal votes	0	0.0
Turnout	1,009	17.1

Returns were only reported for 8 of the 14 polling places.

== See also ==
- Electoral results for the district of Goldfields South
- List of New South Wales state by-elections
