= May 1860 Tumut colonial by-election =

By-election in New South Wales, Australia

A by-election was held for the New South Wales Legislative Assembly electorate of Tumut on 10 May 1860 because of the resignation of George Lang.

== Dates ==
Date	Event
10 April 1860	George Lang resigned.
18 April 1860	Writ of election issued by the Speaker of the Legislative Assembly.
3 May 1860	Nominations
10 May 1860	Polling day
22 May 1860	Writ due to be returned
4 June 1860	Poll held in Adelong

== Result ==
1860 The Tumut by-election Thursday 10 May
Candidate	Votes	%
Daniel Deniehy (elected)	172	55.3
John Egan	139	44.7
Total formal votes	311	100.0
Informal votes	0	0.0
Turnout	311	40.0

The by-election was overturned by the Election and Qualifications Committee due to voting irregularities.

== Aftermath ==
While Daniel Deniehy was declared elected he was also elected at the East Macquarie by-election held on the same day, Deniehy took his seat as the member for East Macquarie and doesn't appear in the records kept by the Legislative Assembly as a member for Tumut.

== See also ==
- Electoral results for the district of Tumut
- List of New South Wales state by-elections
