= 1861 Parramatta colonial by-election =

By-election in New South Wales, Australia

A by-election was held for the New South Wales Legislative Assembly electorate of Parramatta on 10 April 1861 caused by the resignation of sitting member James Byrnes. At the election in December 1860 he gained second place behind a newcomer John Lackey. While still successful, Byrnes took offence at being placed second, stating that the majority of voters had decided that he was not fit to serve them and resigned in March 1861 without taking his seat.

== Dates ==
Date	Event
8 December 1860	Election for Parramatta
26 March 1861	James Byrnes resigned.
27 March 1861	Writ of election issued by the Speaker of the Legislative Assembly.
8 April 1861	Nominations.
10 April 1861	Polling day
13 April 1861	Return of writ

== Candidates ==
- Charles Kemp was a journalist and businessman. He was a former member for Liverpool Plains who had been defeated at the election in December 1860.
- Arthur Holroyd was a barrister and former member for Western Boroughs.
- John Harrington West was a one-time candidate and very little is known about him. His nomination speech was greeted with much laughter, which suggests his candidacy was intended to be humorous. He did however hold a meeting to set out his political principles, and at the nominations the show of hands was declared to be in his favour.

== Results ==
1861 Parramatta by-election Wednesday 10 April
Candidate	Votes	%
Arthur Holroyd (elected)	275	49.1
Charles Kemp	244	43.6
John West	41	7.3
Total formal votes	560	100.0
Informal votes	0	0.0
Turnout	560	45.9

== See also ==
- Electoral results for the district of Parramatta
- List of New South Wales state by-elections
