= Henry Rotton =

English-born Australian politician (1814–1881)

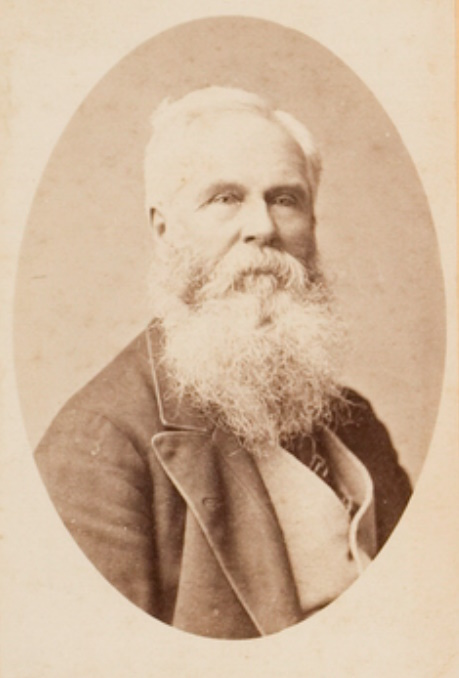

Member for Western Boroughs (NSW Legislative Assembly)
- In office 28 January 1858 – 11 April 1859

Member for Hartley (NSW Legislative Assembly)
- In office 25 June 1859 – 10 November 1860

Member for Hartley (NSW Legislative Assembly)
- In office 14 December 1860 – 10 November 1864

Personal details
- Born: 16 August 1814 Frome Selwood, Somerset, England
- Died: 11 October 1881 (aged 67) Moruya, New South Wales
- Spouse(s): (1) Lorn Jane Macpherson (2) Mary Ann Ford
- Parents: Gilbert Rotton (father); Mary Caroline (née Humphries) (mother)

Henry Rotton (16 August 1814 – 11 October 1881) was an English-born Australian businessman and politician.

Rotton settled in the Bathurst district from 1839, establishing himself as a publican and mail-coach operator. He settled at the 'Blackdown' property near Kelso and was a successful breeder of horses, cattle and sheep. He also invested in other pastoral properties in the colony. Rotton was elected to the New South Wales Legislative Assembly, initially in the electorate of Western Boroughs from January 1858 to April 1859, and for two terms as the member for Hartley from June 1859 to November 1864. Rotton made several unsuccessful attempts at contesting parliamentary seats from the mid-1860s to the mid-1870s.

Henry Rotton had an involvement in a well-known incident of the bushranging era when a gang besieged the homestead of Rotton's daughter and son-in-law, Catherine and Henry Keightley.

== Biography ==
=== Early life ===
Henry Rotton was born on 16 August 1814 at Frome Selwood, county Somerset in England, the only son of Gilbert Rotton and Mary Caroline (née Humphries). His father was a solicitor.

Young Henry received his early education at a school in Frome and afterwards at the nearby city of Wells (west of Frome).

Henry Rotton developed a strong desire to enter the Royal Navy. His father consulted his nephew, naval captain Fairfax Moresby (later an admiral), in the hope of entering his son in the naval service, but he was advised it was not possible. Henry's father then allowed his son "to take a trial trip in a merchant vessel". However, the ship was wrecked in the West Indies. Rotton then joined a vessel bound for the African coast, but he was abandoned by the captain in the British colony of Gold Coast "without friends or resources" and suffering from yellow fever. Rotton recovered from the disease after being cared for by "some negroes" and afterwards became a guest of the Governor of Gold Coast, George Maclean.

=== Sydney ===
From the Gold Coast in West Africa Rotton took a passage on a ship bound for Australia and arrived at Sydney, possibly in November 1833. He found a position as a clerk working for Mr. James, a businessman based at Parramatta, in which position he remained until early 1839.^{[A]}

=== Solitary Creek ===
Early in 1839 Rotton went to live at Solitary Creek (later named Rydal) in the Central West region of New South Wales, its location described as a "purling stream, in a grassy vale". From about February 1839 he leased the Queen Victoria Inn on the Bathurst Road near Solitary Creek, and was granted a license for the public-house. The inn provided accommodation for travellers, with four sitting rooms and five bedrooms, and included stables, paddocks and stockyards. The premises had been opened in July 1838 and was initially leased by Dennis Kenny, who by November 1838 had abandoned the property with rent in arrears.^{[B]}

Henry Rotton and Lorn Jane Macpherson were married in 1839. The couple had two children, born in 1840 and 1841. Lorn Rotton died on 11 September 1842 at Solitary Creek, aged 25.

=== Bathurst district ===
Rotton and his children moved to Bathurst in July 1843. From July 1843 to 1848 Rotton held the publicans' license of the Queen Victoria Inn on the corner of George and Piper streets in Bathurst, named after his previous public-house at Solitary Creek.

Henry Rotton and Mary Ann Ford were married on 18 March 1844 at Kelso (across the Macquarie River opposite Bathurst). The couple had eleven children born from 1846 to 1871.

In 1848 Rotton became a contractor for the conveyance of post office mails. His tender for the amount of £1,200 was accepted in January 1848 for the next twelve months. The contract was for the following routes: between Penrith and Bathurst, via Hartley, "by two or more horse coaches, three times a week, performing the journey in the day"; to and from Bathurst, Molong and Wellington (once a week) and Bathurst and Carcoar (three times a week), by two horse mail cart; to and from Bathurst and O'Connell, twice a week, by one horse mail cart.

By the early 1850s he was operating coaches on seven routes from Bathurst to the district townships of Orange, Wellington, Hartley, Rockley, Ophir, Sofala and Carcoar. In 1854 the Rockley, Ophir, Sofala and Carcoar routes were taken over by other contractors, but Rotton continued to operate the other coachlines until 1857.

Rotton was described as "a man of indomitable pluck and perseverence". In October 1851 James Sutherland and a man named McCann arrived at Bathurst with other passengers on one of Rotton's coaches from the Turon diggings. McCann left thirty pounds in the possession of Mrs. Rotton for safe-keeping "until he left town". On the following night Mary Rotton handed the money to her husband, less one pound for McCann's account, and informed Sutherland of the arrangement (who Mrs. Rotton mistook for McCann as the two closely resembled each other). Sutherland then booked himself on the mailcoach to Sydney for the following morning and requested the money from Rotton, which he received. The following morning, after the coach had departed, McCann approached Rotton and requested his money, at which time the error was discovered. Rotton then started on horseback "in pursuit of the mail" and reached Hartley shortly after its arrival there. He found Sutherland at an accommodation house and demanded the money, but received an evasive answer. Rotton then searched Sutherland and found a total of £22, hidden in the toe of his boot and in his hat. Sutherland was tried at the Bathurst Quarter Sessions in January 1852, indicted "for surreptitiously obtaining the sum of £29 from Mrs. Rotton". The jury returned a verdict of guilty against the prisoner, who was sentenced to "two years' hard labour upon the roads". McCann had left the district after the transaction, leading Rotton to conclude "that the whole affair was a plot" between McCann and Sutherland "to defraud him".

In 1853 Rotton purchased the 'Blackdown' pastoral property, north of Kelso, where he resided with his family. He also became part owner of several stations on the Lachlan and Macquarie rivers, including 'Gungalman' in the Lachlan District. Rotton was a successful breeder of horses, cattle and sheep at 'Blackdown', often winning prizes for his livestock at agricultural shows in the local district and in Sydney.

By the late 1850s Rotton was a justice of the peace and occasionally acted in the role of police magistrate for the district.

=== Political career ===
At the general election held in January and February 1858 Rotton was elected to represent the electoral district of Western Boroughs in the New South Wales Legislative Assembly, an electorate that included Blayney, Carcoar and Rockley. Rotton ran against the sitting candidate, Arthur Holroyd, and was elected with a margin of six votes, polling 230 votes (or 50.7 percent) against Holroyd's 224 votes. At the declaration of the poll on 30 January Rotton declared that "he was no party man", describing the present state of politics in the colony as "one ill defined heterogeneous mass". He described the predominant political faction under Charles Cowper as a liberal one and he himself "would be liberal likewise, if they would consent to enact laws conferring social and religious freedom on all classes of men... such as would promote progress and rational reform, not continuing to tinker up laws which did not require it, but eradicating bad laws wherever they existed".

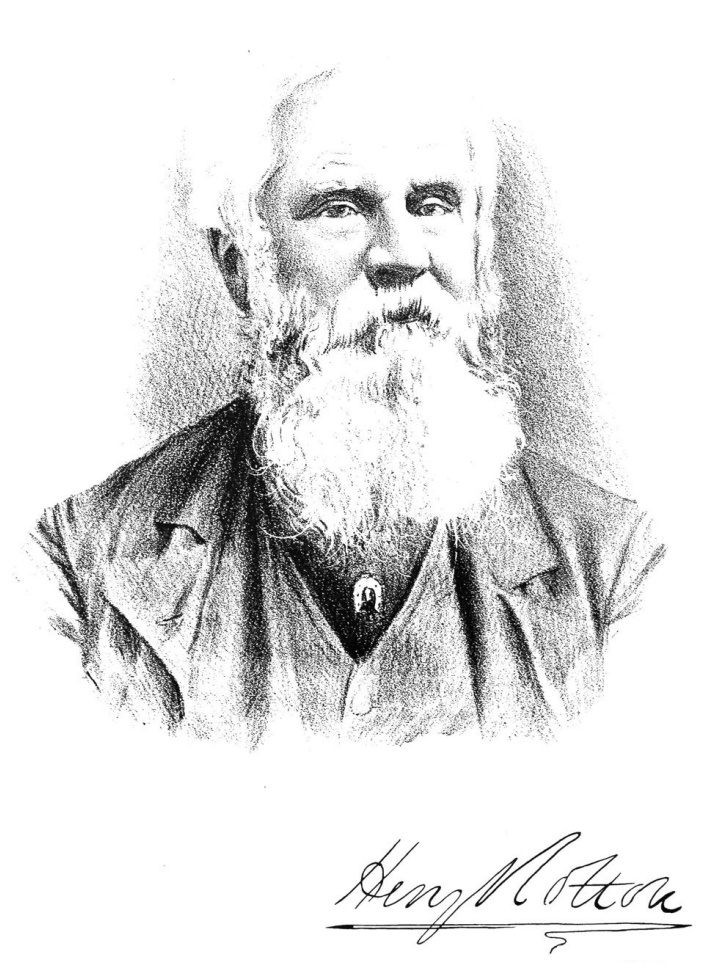
Portrait of Henry Rotton published in Australian Men of Mark, Vol. I (1889).

During his first term in parliament Rotton openly supported aspects of the liberal agenda of John Robertson and Charles Cowper, including the abolition of state aid to religion. He maintained that all the Christian denominations should be treated alike and opposed grants to the Anglican and Catholic churches.

The Legislative Assembly was dissolved on 11 April 1859 and writs were issued by the Governor to proceed with an election. At the general election held in June and July 1859 Rotton decided to contest the rural electorate of Bathurst (County). Rotton and the pastoralist John Clements contested the seat, with Clements taking the conservative position of opposing the abolition of state aid to religion. At the election held on 9 June 1859 Rotton was defeated, attracting only 278 votes (44.4 percent). Rotton then decided to nominate for the electorate of Hartley, a district where he owned property and was known to electors. Nominations for the seat were held on 20 June 1859. The only other candidate was the solicitor John Ryan Brenan, who had previously held the rural seat of Cumberland (South Riding) on Sydney's urban fringe. At the election held five days later Rotton was successfully elected for the seat of Hartley, receiving 281 votes (57.8 percent).

Rotton opposed free selection before survey as proposed in the Land Acts introduced into parliament in 1860 by the Robertson ministry.

At the general election held in December 1860 Rotton was one of three candidates who nominated for the Bathurst electorate (replacing the Western Boroughs electorate). The election was held on 6 December and Rotton polled second, with only 113 votes (23 percent), losing the contest against James Hart (who had previously been the member for New England). Four days later Rotton nominated for the seat of Hartley, of which he was the sitting member. He was elected at the poll on 14 December against one other candidate, attracting 190 votes (54.1 percent). After his defeat in the Bathurst electorate and subsequent nomination and success in the election for the Hartley seat, it was claimed in Freeman's Journal that Rotton had been affiliated with the secretive Constitutional Association, an organisation formed to support candidates who opposed land reform in the New South Wales parliament. The newspaper explained that one of the tactics of the Association was to "send their retained advocates, though beaten in one constituency, to as many others as possible" in order to spread falsehoods about the principles of the Land Bill and "delude and humbug the electors".^{[C]}

During this term of parliament Rotton took a conspicuous part in the railway estimates debate and was successful in his advocacy of having the allocated sum equally divided between the three main railway lines of the colony, rather than being weighed heavily towards extending the Southern line to Albury to connect Sydney with Melbourne.

=== Bushrangers ===
Henry Rotton's eldest daughter Caroline (born in December 1840 at Solitary Creek) had married Henry Keightley in December 1860 at Kelso. Keightley was an assistant Gold Commissioner and the couple lived at 'Dunn's Plains' near Rockley, 29 miles (36 km) south of Bathurst. On the evening of Saturday, 24 October 1863, the bushrangers John Gilbert, John O’Meally, Ben Hall, John Vane and Mick Burke approached the 'Dunn's Plains' homestead. Henry Keightley was about thirty yards from the house when the gang rode up and ordered him to "bail up". Rather than obey the order Keightley ran towards the house with the bushrangers firing at him. When he was inside the house, he and a guest, Dr. W. C. Pechey, guarded the door with a double-barrelled gun and a revolver. Keightley and Dr. Pechey were defending the besieged household when Keightley shot Burke in the abdomen as he tried to rush the house. The siege finally ended when Ben Hall threatened to burn the house if the defenders would not lay down their arms, giving Keightley no choice as his wife and child and two servants were sheltering inside. After he had been wounded Burke made a clumsy attempt to shoot himself in the head with his revolver, leaving himself barely alive and unconscious. With Keightley and Pechey in captivity, several of the angry bushrangers wanted to kill Keightley to avenge the shooting of Burke but eventually Hall and Gilbert decided that the Gold Commissioner's life should be spared for a ransom payment of five hundred pounds (the identical amount of reward offered by the government for the apprehension of each of the bushrangers). In an attempt to treat the mortally wounded Burke, Dr. Pechey was allowed to travel to Rockley to retrieve his instruments, promising he would not raise the alarm, but the bushranger died during his absence.

Caroline Keightley and Dr. Pechey were then allowed to travel to Bathurst by buggy to collect the ransom money, with the bushrangers vowing to shoot Caroline's husband if the police were notified. Their captive was taken to a nearby hill overlooking the Bathurst road, to await their return. Pechey and Mrs. Keightley arrived at 'Blackdown' in the early hours of Sunday morning and roused Caroline's father to advise him of the situation. Henry Rotton and Dr. Pechey then rode to Bathurst and woke the manager of the Commercial Bank so they could procure the required money. The two men arrived at the 'Dunn's Plains' homestead at about mid-morning. Inside the house Rotton hastily recorded the serial numbers on the notes before Dr. Pechey mounted his horse and rode to the bushrangers' camp with the ransom money. After Keightley's liberty was exchanged for the ransom, he and Dr. Pechey returned to the house and the bushrangers hastily left the locality. After his son-in-law had been released Rotton rode into Rockley and gave a report of the events to the police. He returned to 'Dunn's Plains' and then started for Bathurst to alert the police there. However news had already reached Bathurst; near the outskirts of town he was met with a party of mounted troopers on their way to 'Dunn's Plains'.^{[D]}

=== Political attempts ===
At the general election held from late November 1864 to early January 1865 Rotton decided to once again contest the seat of Bathurst, but was defeated by James Kemp in a two-way contest held on 21 December.

Rotton was elected as a director of the Bathurst Sheep Board in 1866 and served as its chairman from 1869 until 1881. He was a member of the local public school board from 1868 and served as chairman from 1874.

Rotton attempted to re-enter politics at the 1872 general election, once again nominating for the Bathurst electorate, but was defeated by Edward Combes. He made another attempt in 1873, contesting the seat of East Macquarie at a by-election held on 1 December 1873, but he finished second in a field of four candidates. He made one further attempt at the general election held from early December 1874 to early January 1875, contesting the seat of seat of West Macquarie against one other candidate, but polled second in the vote held on 4 January.

=== Last years ===
Henry Rotton died on 11 October 1881, aged 67, at 'Mynora', a property he owned near Moruya where his daughter Caroline and son-in-law, Henry Keightley, were living. At that time Keightley was the local Police Magistrate. Rotton was buried in the Baptist cemetery at Bathurst. His possessions were valued for probate at £29,000.

== Notes ==
A.Some references state that Henry Rotton arrived in Australia in 1836, initially arriving at Kangaroo Island, South Australia, as second mate aboard the vessel Emma, after which he made his way to Sydney. In the first report of the South Australian Company, a public corporation formed to purchase land and develop commercial and shipping operations in the new colony of South Australia, it was noted that "the brig Emma has been chartered by the month as a store ship" to supply the company's holdings on Kangaroo Island. The company's chartered brig Emma arrived at Kingscote, Kangaroo Island, on 11 September 1836.

B.In May 1838 Dennis Kenny, a former sergeant of the 17th Regiment of Foot, announced that the Queen Victoria Inn at Solitary Creek, "on the new line of road from Sydney to Bathurst", would be opened on 1 July 1838. The inn was built by Alexander Fraser of Penrith and Kenny had taken on a five-year lease for the building. Kenny probably abandoned the premises with his rental payments in arrears. In November 1838 the proprietor Alexander Fraser had notices published describing Kenny as "my late tenant" and threatening to sell his household furniture by public auction unless Kenny "pays the rent due to me".

C.The Constitutional Association was a secretive organisation formed in Sydney in November 1860, whose members were described by The Empire newspaper as "gentlemen of tory and conservative tendencies" and also as "squatters and their adherents". The organisation was formed in order to support candidates opposed to land reform and the principle of free selection before survey in the upcoming elections.

D.Henry McCrummin Keightley arrived in New South Wales soon after the gold discoveries of 1851 and began working as a clerk in the General Post Office in Sydney. He was commissioned as an ensign in a volunteer regiment, the 1st Sydney Rifles, and was later promoted to lieutenant. In August 1855 Keightley was posted to Tamworth as a clerk of petty sessions, after which he was transferred as an assistant gold commissioner of the Rockley-Abercrombie goldfield, stationed at Rockley. He initially resided with a police escort at the Summer Hill copper mines seven miles south of Rockley. After his marriage to Catherine Rotton in December 1860 the government leased the 'Dunn's Plains' homestead, belonging to William Bowman of Richmond, as his official residence. Keightley was promoted to police magistrate at Wellington in 1870. In 1875 he was appointed as police magistrate at Moruya and in October 1883 at Albury. Henry Keightley died in January 1887 at Sale, in the Gippsland district of Victoria. Keightley's role in the confrontation with the bushrangers at 'Dunn's Plains' in October 1863 was the inspiration for the character of 'Mr. Knightley' in Rolf Boldrewood's novel Robbery Under Arms (published in the 1880s).

New South Wales Legislative Assembly
| Preceded by Arthur Holroyd | Member for Western Boroughs; 1858–1859 | Abolished |
| New seat | Member for Hartley; 1859–1864 | Succeeded by John Lucas |
