= Gundagai Times and Tumut, Adelong and Murrumbidgee District Advertiser =

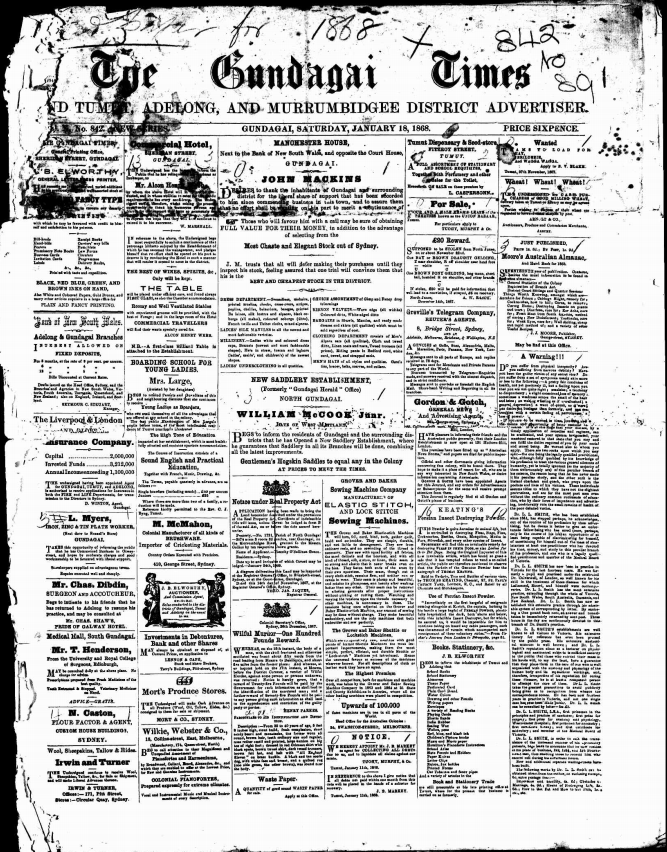
Gundagai Times and Tumut, Adelong and Murrumbidgee District Advertiser, 18 January 1868

The Gundagai Times and Tumut, Adelong, and Murrumbidgee District Advertiser, often referred to as simply the Gundagai Times, was a newspaper published in Gundagai, New South Wales, Australia from 1868 to 1931. It was a direct successor of The Wynyard Times and Tumut and Adelong Advertiser and The Tumut and Adelong Times, published in Tumut, New South Wales, and was absorbed into The Gundagai Independent in 1931.

== History ==
The Wynyard Times or Wynyard Times and Tumut and Adelong Advertiser was first published on 20 November 1860 in Russell Street, Tumut, as a twice-weekly (Tuesdays and Fridays) newspaper by J. B. Elworthy & Co., and was a replacement for the Adelong Mining Journal, published by the defunct firm of Morgan and Elworthy from 1858. The principals of Elworthy & Co. (partnership dissolved August 1862) were James Baker Elworthy, Cornelius Inglis and Thomas Garrett.

In December 1864 Elworthy dropped the reference to the County of Wynyard (which encompasses the parishes of Batlow, South Wagga Wagga, Tumut, Selwyn, Adelong and South Gundagai), and the paper became the Tumut and Adelong Times, with enlarged content, but maintaining the issue sequence from the earlier title.

In January 1868, shortly after the Murrumbidgee bridge at Gundagai was opened, Elworthy shifted his operations there, and relaunched the paper as a weekly, with the new banner on 18 January 1868. It was a large weekly journal, began at Vol X, No. 842 and was priced at sixpence. The impetus for the move was influenced by poor financial returns on subscriptions from the Tumut and Adelong Times, but also the better communications available at Gundagai, both for news gathering and distribution.

The newspaper was published on a Saturday, was four pages long, with six columns across each page. Every issue included two columns of editorial from the owner. Elworthy remained at the helm of the newspaper until his death on 3 March 1889, aged 55. His eldest son Arthur Elworthy (1865 – May 1935), who had worked as a reporter for the paper, inherited the business, and was in active ownership until 1931, when he sold it to the proprietors of The Gundagai Independent, with which it was integrated.

== Digitisation ==
The Tumut and Adelong Times and Gundagai Times and Tumut, Adelong and Murrumbidgee District Advertiser have been digitised as part of the Australian Newspapers Digitisation Program project of the National Library of Australia.

== See also ==
- List of newspapers in Australia
- List of newspapers in New South Wales
