= 1863 Orange colonial by-election =

By-election in New South Wales, Australia

A by-election was held for the New South Wales Legislative Assembly electorate of Orange on 4 November 1863. The by-election was triggered because James Martin had replaced Charles Cowper as Premier, establishing his first ministry. While the title of Premier was widely used to refer to the Leader of Government, it was not a formal position until 1920 and the Premier also held a formal position in the cabinet, in Martin's case this position was Attorney-General. Such ministerial by-elections were usually uncontested and on this occasion, Peter Faucett (Yass), William Forster (East Sydney) and Arthur Holroyd (Parramatta) were unopposed. The two other ministers, Geoffrey Eagar (West Sydney) and Bowie Wilson (Goldfields South) were easily re-elected, with more than 90% of the vote.

Charles Cowper's son, Charles Cowper Jr., was also a member of parliament and resigned from The Tumut to challenge Martin at the by-election.

== Dates ==
Date	Event
16 October 1863	James Martin appointed Attorney-General.
20 October 1863	Writ of election issued by the Speaker of the Legislative Assembly.
2 November 1863	Nominations
4 November 1863	Polling day
11 November 1863	Return of writ

== Results ==
1863 Orange by-election Wednesday 4 November
Candidate	Votes	%
Charles Cowper Jr. (elected)	292	51.4
James Martin (defeated)	276	48.6
Total formal votes	568	100.0
Informal votes	0	0.0
Turnout	568	67.7

== Aftermath ==
While defeated, Martin promptly returned to parliament, winning the by-election for The Tumut, the seat vacated by Charles Cowper Jr. In 1864 Cowper stated that his health prevented him from re-contesting Orange, however he was nominated for The Tumut and again defeated Martin.

== See also ==
- Electoral results for the district of Orange
- List of New South Wales state by-elections
