= 1882 Tumut colonial by-election =

By-election in New South Wales, Australia

A by-election was held for the New South Wales Legislative Assembly electorate of The Tumut on 17 October 1882 because James Hoskins resigned.

== Dates ==
Date	Event
26 September 1882	James Hoskins resigned.
27 September 1882	Writ of election issued by the Speaker of the Legislative Assembly.
12 October 1882	Nominations
17 October 1882	Polling day
24 October 1882	Return of writ

== Result ==
1882 The Tumut by-election Tuesday 17 October
Candidate	Votes	%
Thomas O'Mara (elected)	527	50.8
Solomon Emanuel	299	28.8
Charles Bardwell	212	20.4
Total formal votes	1,038	100.0
Informal votes	0	0.0
Turnout	1,038	56.0

== See also ==
- Electoral results for the district of Tumut
- List of New South Wales state by-elections
