= Pimelea holroydii =

Scientific classification
- Kingdom: Plantae
- Clade: Tracheophytes
- Clade: Angiosperms
- Clade: Eudicots
- Clade: Rosids
- Order: Malvales
- Family: Thymelaeaceae
- Genus: Pimelea
- Species: P. holroydii

Binomial name
- Pimelea holroydii F.Muell.

Synonyms
- Banksia holroydii (F.Muell.) Kuntze; Pimelea holroydi F.Muell. orth. var.

Species of shrub

Pimelea holroydii is a species of flowering plant in the family Thymelaeaceae and is endemic to the north of Western Australia. It is an erect shrub with egg-shaped leaves arranged more or less in opposite pairs, and head-like clusters of white or cream-coloured, tube-shaped flowers.

== Description ==
Pimelea holroydii is an erect shrub that usually grows to a height of 0.3–1 m (1 ft 0 in – 3 ft 3 in) and has a single stem at ground level. The leaves are arranged more or less in opposite pairs, egg-shaped to broadly egg-shaped, 12–37 mm (0.47–1.46 in) long and 6–20 mm (0.24–0.79 in) wide on a petiole 0.5–2 mm (0.020–0.079 in) long. The flowers are arranged in heads on a peduncle usually 5–30 mm (0.20–1.18 in) long, the flowers surrounded by 4 to 7 egg-shaped to broadly egg-shaped, green involucral bracts 9–20 mm (0.35–0.79 in) long and 7–16 mm (0.28–0.63 in) wide. As the flowers develop, the heads become more elongated. The flowers are usually white, sometimes cream-coloured, each flower on a pedicel 0.5–1 mm (0.020–0.039 in) long. The floral tube is 2–3 mm (0.079–0.118 in) long and densely hairy, the sepals 2.5–3.0 mm (0.098–0.118 in) long. Flowering occurs in January and February and from August to October.

== Taxonomy ==
Pimelea holroydii was first formally described in 1868 by Ferdinand von Mueller in Fragmenta Phytographiae Australiae from specimens collected by Charles Harper in the Hamersley Range. The specific epithet (holroydii) honours Arthur Holroyd.

== Distribution and habitat ==
This pimelea grows on red, clayey soil from the Hamersley Range to Mount James Station in the Gascoyne, Murchison and Pilbara bioregions of northern Western Australia.

== Conservation status ==
Pimelea holroydii is listed as "not threatened" by the Government of Western Australia Department of Biodiversity, Conservation and Attractions.
