= 1863 Tumut colonial by-election =

By-election in New South Wales, Australia

A by-election was held for the New South Wales Legislative Assembly electorate of The Tumut on 16 November 1863. The by-election was triggered because of the resignation of Charles Cowper Jr. James Martin had replaced Charles Cowper Sr as Premier, establishing his first ministry, and Cowper Jr. resigned his seat to successfully challenge Martin at the Orange by-election.

== Dates ==
Date	Event
16 October 1863	James Martin appointed Premier and Attorney-General.
24 October 1863	Charles Cowper Jr. resigned his seat.
27 October 1863	Writ of election issued by the Speaker of the Legislative Assembly.
10 November 1863	Nominations
16 November 1863	Polling day
1 December 1863	Return of writ

== Result ==
1863 The Tumut by-election Monday 16 November
Candidate	Votes	%
James Martin (elected)	393	72.2
C D O'Connell	151	27.8
Total formal votes	544	100.0
Informal votes	0	0.0
Turnout	544	54.0

== See also ==
- Electoral results for the district of Tumut
- List of New South Wales state by-elections
