= The Gundagai Independent =

Newspaper in Australia

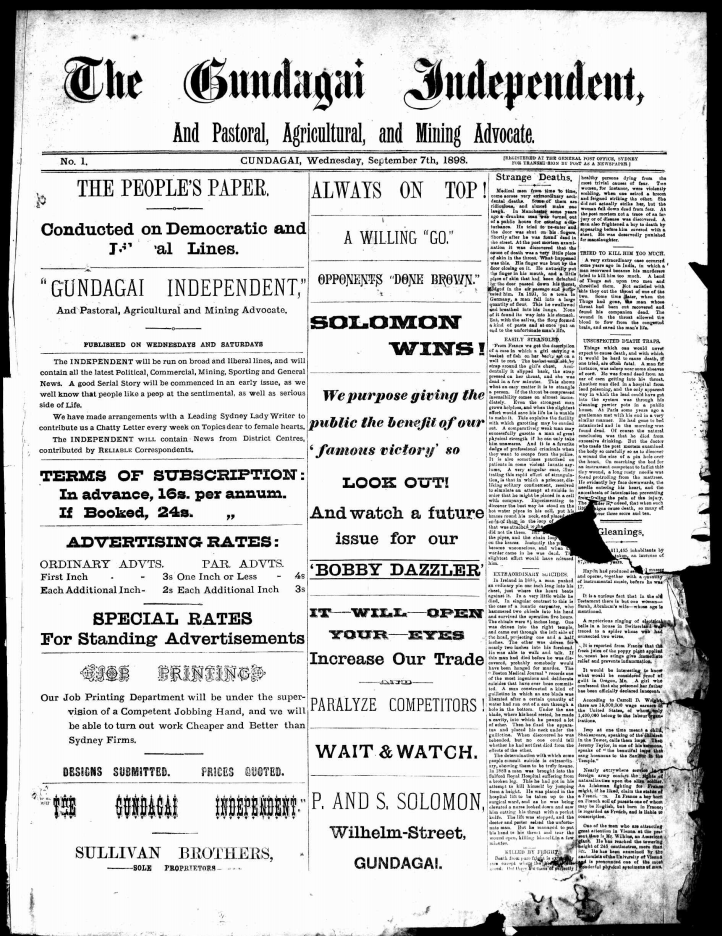
The Gundagai Independent and Pastoral, Agricultural and Mining Advocate, 7 September 1898

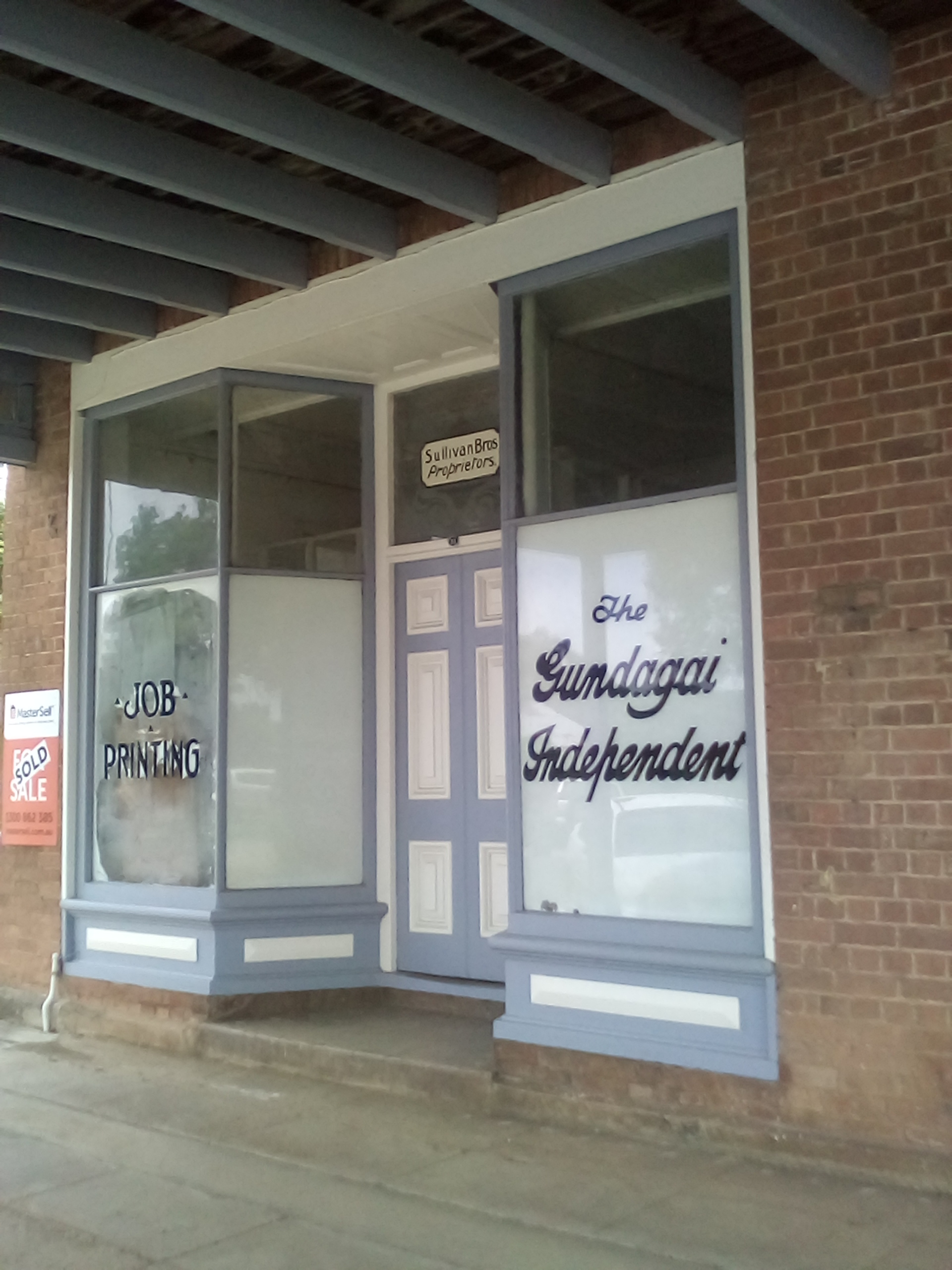
Shopfront on Sheridan Street

The Gundagai Independent is a newspaper published in Gundagai, New South Wales, Australia since 1898. It was previously published as The Gundagai Independent and Pastoral, Agricultural and Mining Advocate.

== History ==
The Gundagai Independent and Pastoral, Agricultural and Mining Advocate was first published on 7 September 1898 by Patrick and James Sullivan as a competitor to The Gundagai Times and Tumut, Adelong, and Murrumbidgee District Advertiser. The first issue proclaimed that it would "be run on truly liberal and democratic lines". The Independent has been continuously published by members of the Sullivan family since its beginning. In 1928 the newspaper shortened its name to The Gundagai Independent and in 1932 it absorbed its competitor.

== Digitisation ==
The paper has been digitised as part of the Australian Newspapers Digitisation Program project of the National Library of Australia.

== See also ==
- List of newspapers in Australia
- List of newspapers in New South Wales
