= Rockley, New South Wales =

Rockley New South Wales
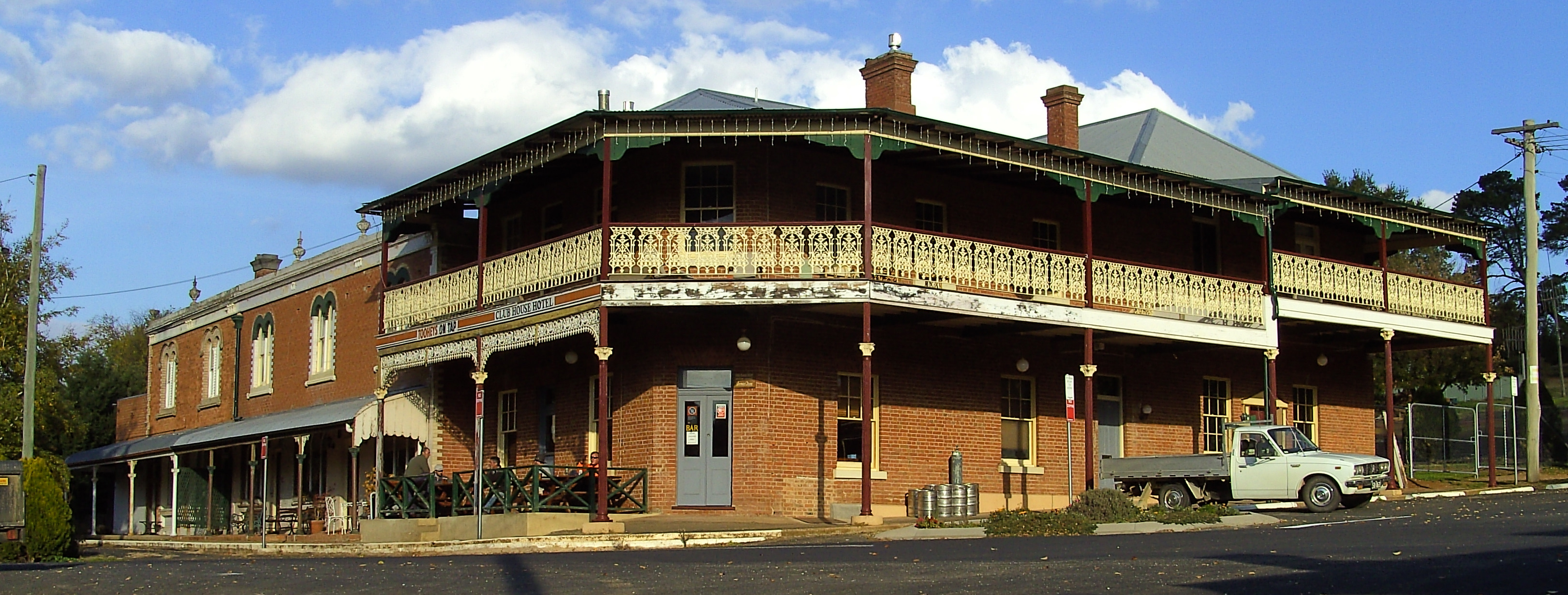
- The Rockley Pub, previously known as the Club House Hotel, Budden Street, Rockley

- Coordinates: 33°42′S 149°34′E
- Population: 180 (2021 census)
- Postcode(s): 2795
- Elevation: 854 m (2,802 ft)
- Location: 235 km (146 mi) from Sydney; 228 km (142 mi) from Canberra; 356 km (221 mi) from Newcastle
- LGA(s): Bathurst Regional Council
Mean max temp	Mean min temp	Annual rainfall
19.1 °C; 66 °F	3.7 °C; 39 °F	705.9 mm 27.8 in

Rockley is a small village in the Central Tablelands region in New South Wales, Australia. At the 2021 census, Rockley had a population of 180 people.

Rockley has a tablelands climate similar to Bathurst. Summers are generally warm and mild. Autumn is generally mild to cool with few frosts at the end of the season. Winter is generally cool to cold with some day times maxima under 5 degrees, there are on average about 3 snowfalls per years. Many days through winter have thick frost and fog. Spring has some late frosts and then days turn warm.

== History ==
Rockley was first opened as a township in 1848 after a copper mine was opened 8 km from the town and gold was also uncovered. However it was first granted as farm land to William Lawson in 1818, then granted to Captain Watson Augustus Steel who named the property after his birthplace in Rockley, Wiltshire, England.

== Buildings ==
Currently the village has two churches, an Anglican church and a Catholic church. There are two recreation halls, the School of Arts Hall and the Sports Oval Hall.

Accommodation is available at a bed and breakfast that was at one time a bank building on Budden Street in the centre of the town.

== Climate ==
Climate data for Rockley post office
Month	Jan	Feb	Mar	Apr	May	Jun	Jul	Aug	Sep	Oct	Nov	Dec	Year
Mean daily maximum °C (°F)	26.7 (80.1)	27.0 (80.6)	23.7 (74.7)	19.7 (67.5)	14.3 (57.7)	11.2 (52.2)	10.1 (50.2)	12.0 (53.6)	15.4 (59.7)	19.1 (66.4)	23.2 (73.8)	25.8 (78.4)	19.0 (66.2)
Mean daily minimum °C (°F)	10.2 (50.4)	10.2 (50.4)	7.2 (45.0)	3.4 (38.1)	1.0 (33.8)	−0.5 (31.1)	−1.0 (30.2)	−1.1 (30.0)	0.9 (33.6)	3.0 (37.4)	5.9 (42.6)	8.1 (46.6)	3.9 (39.1)
Average rainfall mm (inches)	72.0 (2.83)	57.0 (2.24)	57.4 (2.26)	46.6 (1.83)	46.8 (1.84)	55.6 (2.19)	58.3 (2.30)	63.6 (2.50)	55.4 (2.18)	65.8 (2.59)	63.6 (2.50)	63.6 (2.50)	705.7 (27.76)
Average precipitation days (≥ 1 mm)	5.3	4.8	4.5	4.1	5.4	6.4	6.9	7.1	6.3	6.2	5.6	5.1	67.7
