= George Dunmore Lang =

Australian politician

George Dunmore Lang (30 September 1832 – 12 January 1875) was an Australian politician.

Lang was born in Sydney to John Dunmore Lang and Wilhelmina Mackie. He attended the University of Glasgow and the University of Edinburgh, returning to work as a clerk for the Bank of New South Wales. In 1852 he went to Geelong and then Ballarat to work as an accountant. He was arrested in 1854 and sentenced to five years' hard labour, but he was released in 1857 after an enquiry by the parliament. He then worked as a journalist in Brisbane, and in 1859 was elected to the New South Wales Legislative Assembly for Tumut. He resigned in 1860 and travelled to Scotland, where he was an agent for the Moreton Bay Company. From 1866 to 1868 he clerked in the Audit Office. Lang died at Gulgong in 1875.

New South Wales Legislative Assembly
New seat	Member for Tumut; 1859–1860	Succeeded by Charles Cowper, Jr.
