= Edward George Brown =

Australian politician

Edward George Brown (1829 – 3 August 1895) was a Danish-born Australian politician.

He was born in Kokadahl in Denmark to pastoralist John Brown and Charlotte Dowling. The family moved to New South Wales in 1836 and Brown attended The King's School, Parramatta. He settled in the Tumut, where he owned extensive property. On 12 December 1854 he married Amelia Matilda Shelley, with whom he had twelve children. He was a long-serving Tumut alderman, serving five times as mayor.

In 1866 he was elected to the New South Wales Legislative Assembly, winning the by-election for Tumut. He was defeated in 1872, and left colonial politics for a long period. In 1891, almost twenty years after his previous defeat, he was re-elected to Tumut as a Free Trader. He was defeated in 1894.

Brown died in Tumut in 1895.

New South Wales Legislative Assembly
Preceded by Charles Cowper Jr.	Member for Tumut; 1866–1872	Succeeded by James Hoskins
Preceded by Travers Jones	Member for Tumut; 1891–1894	Succeeded by Travers Jones
