= Travers Jones =

Irish-born Australian politician

Travers Jones (2 March 1832 – 9 June 1908) was an Irish-born Australian politician.

He was born in County Westmeath, the son of Gustavus Jones of Belville. He arrived in Port Phillip in 1852 and was a miner and mine manager. He married Emily Crowe on 17 November 1875, with whom he had six children. In 1878 he lost the use of his hands following a mine accident at Rutherglen. He owned mines at Muttama and Adelong. In 1885 Jones was elected to the New South Wales Legislative Assembly as the member for Tumut. A Protectionist, he was re-elected in 1887 and 1889 but defeated in 1891, before returning to the Assembly in 1894. He was defeated again in 1898. Jones died at Camperdown in 1908.

New South Wales Legislative Assembly
Preceded by Thomas O'Mara	Member for Tumut; 1885–1891	Succeeded by Edward Brown
Preceded by Edward Brown	Member for Tumut; 1894–1898	Succeeded by Robert Donaldson
