= Electoral district of Wynyard =

Former state electoral district of New South Wales, Australia

Wynyard was an electoral district for the Legislative Assembly in the Australian State of New South Wales from 1904 to 1913, including the town of Tumut and named after Wynyard County. It replaced all of the abolished district of Tumut and part of the abolished district of Gundagai. Its only member was Robert Donaldson. The Federal Capital Territory was removed from New South Wales in 1911 and Wynyard was abolished in the 1912 redistribution. Most of the district, including the town of Tumut was absorbed by the district of Yass and the balance was distributed between the surrounding districts of Cootamundra, Wagga Wagga and Albury.

== Members for Wynyard ==
| Member | Party | Term |
|---|---|---|
| Robert Donaldson | Progressive | 1904–1907 |
| Robert Donaldson | Independent Liberal | 1907–1913 |

== Election results ==
1910 New South Wales state election: Wynyard
| Party | Candidate | Votes | % | ±% |
|---|---|---|---|---|
| Independent Liberal | Robert Donaldson | 2,722 | 51.0 | −6.8 |
| Labour | Walter Boston | 2,612 | 49.0 | 6.8 |
| Total formal votes | | 5,334 | 98.4 | +0.4 |
| Informal votes | | 87 | 1.6 | −0.4 |
| Turnout | | 5,421 | 78.6 | +0.7 |
| Member changed to Independent Liberal from Progressive (defunct) | | | | |
