= Electoral district of Western Boroughs =

State electorate of New South Wales

Western Boroughs was an electoral district for the Legislative Assembly in the Australian state of New South Wales from 1856 to 1859. It included the towns of Bathurst, Carcoar and Kelso, while the surrounding rural areas were in Bathurst (County) and Cook and Westmoreland. It was replaced by Bathurst and Carcoar.

== Member for Western Boroughs ==
Member	Party	Period
Arthur Holroyd	None	1856–1857
Henry Rotton	None	1858–1859

== Election results ==
=== 1856 ===
1856 New South Wales colonial election: Western Boroughs
Candidate	Votes	%
Arthur Holroyd (elected)	283	66.0
James Byrnes	146	34.0
Total formal votes	429	100.0
Informal votes	0	0.0
Turnout	429	55.7

Polling was conducted on 29 March 1856. Holroyd had represented this district in the old Legislative Council.

=== 1858 ===
1858 New South Wales colonial election: Western Boroughs 28 January
Candidate	Votes	%
Henry Rotton (re-elected)	230	50.7
Arthur Holroyd (defeated)	224	49.3
Total formal votes	454	100.0
Informal votes	0	0.0
Turnout	454	48.3
