= Charles Cowper Jr. =

Australian politician

Charles Cowper
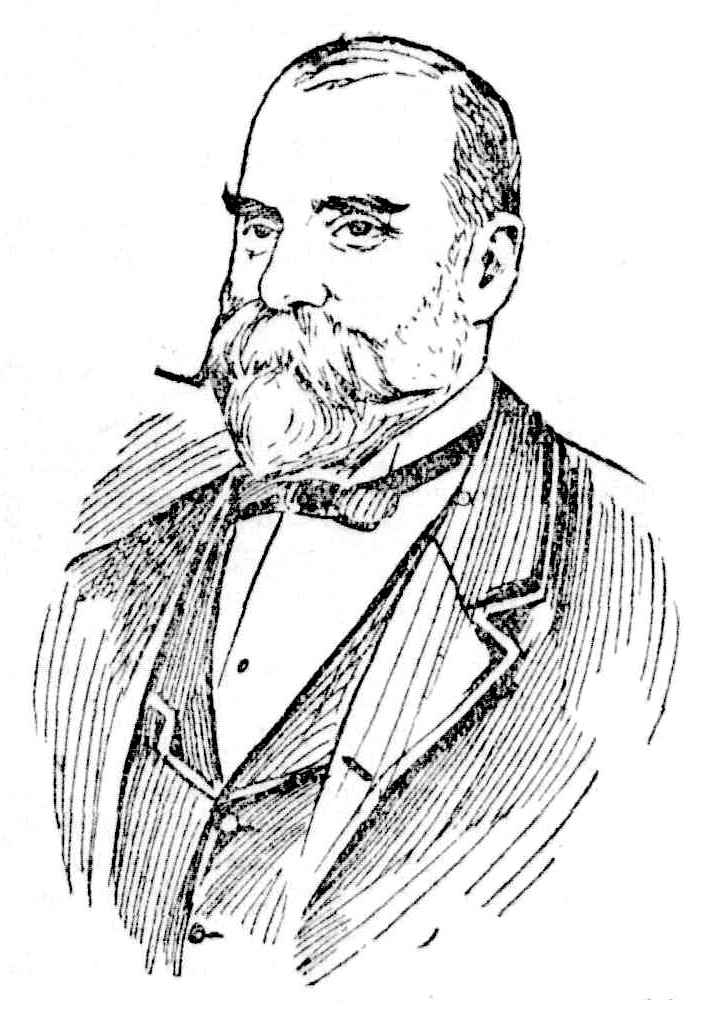

Member for Tumut (NSW Legislative Assembly)
- In office 1 November 1860 – 24 October 1863

Member for Orange
- In office 4 November 1863 – 10 November 1864

Member for Tumut
- In office 10 December 1864 – 25 July 1866

Personal details
- Born: 29 September 1834 Sydney
- Died: 16 November 1911 (aged 77) 'Beulah', Bowral, New South Wales
- Spouse(s): (1) Mary Copland Lethbridge (2) Amy Rose C. Bramley
- Parents: Charles Cowper (father); Eliza (née Sutton) (mother)

Charles Cowper (29 September 1834 – 16 November 1911) was an Australian politician, pastoralist and senior public servant, the son of Sir Charles Cowper who served as Premier of New South Wales on five occasions between 1856 and 1870. During the period 1860 to 1865 Cowper was the elected member of various electorates in support of his father's political faction. In the late 1860s he invested in pastoral runs in south-west Queensland, which ultimately led to financial losses due to prolonged drought conditions. After a short stint as Police Magistrate at Bourke, Cowper was appointed as the Water Police Magistrate in Sydney. In 1874 he was appointed Sheriff of New South Wales, a position he held until his retirement in 1896.

== Early and personal life ==
Charles Cowper was the eldest son of Charles Cowper and Eliza (née Sutton), born on 29 September 1834 at St. Phillip's parsonage in Sydney, the residence of his grandfather, Archdeacon William Cowper. In 1843, when he was aged nine, Cowper was sent to school at Stroud, under the supervision of his uncle, William M. Cowper, then chaplain to the Australian Agricultural Company. He later attended The King's School in Parramatta.

In 1849, when Cowper was aged fifteen, his father arranged for his son to be articled to the solicitor, James Norton. However, during this period the young man's health "broke down", and "eventually he took to station life as a means of restoring his strength".

By the early 1850s, Cowper's father had purchased the lease of 'Burrabogie' pastoral run on the lower Murrumbidgee River, in the Riverina district of New South Wales, which he held for about a year. The price paid for 'Burrabogie' was £500, plus one pound per head for the cattle on the run. Cowper (junior) managed the property for his father. One record states that Cowper managed the run in about 1852 when he was aged seventeen. However, government records indicate that Cowper (senior) held the lease of 'Burrabogie' from September 1853 to September 1854. Following major floods in the Murrumbidgee River in June 1852 and July 1853, Cowper (senior) sold the 'Burrabogie' run, making a profit of four thousand pounds in about twelve months.^{[A]}

By the mid-1850s, Cowper was living at 'Chatsbury' station, a large property north of Goulburn, which he managed for his father. In September 1855 Charles Cowper (junior) of 'Chatsbury' was appointed as a justice of the peace (which entitled him to sit as a magistrate on a local Bench for the dispensation of summary justice).

Charles Cowper and Mary Copland Lethbridge were married on 11 October 1855 at the church of St. Mary Magdalen at South Creek, Parramatta. The bride was a grand-daughter of Philip Gidley King, the third Governor of New South Wales. The couple had eight children, born between 1856 and 1872.

== Career ==
=== Political career ===
In March 1856, when responsible government commenced in the colony, Cowper tried to assist with the organisation of his father's political faction by managing the unsuccessful campaign for John W. Chisholm in the electorate of Argyle. His father, Charles Cowper (senior), who had been a member of the Legislative Council since 1843, was elected to the New South Wales Legislative Assembly in March 1856 and by August that year began serving the first of five terms as Colonial Secretary. The political career of Cowper (senior) continued until 1870.

==== Kiandra ====
After the discovery of gold in November 1859 "on the Snowy Plains, situated upon the Australian Alps", there was a rush to the Kiandra diggings in the Snowy Mountains of New South Wales. In February 1860 Cowper travelled to the Kiandra diggings with goods to sell and to establish a store at the locality. By April 1860 the post-office at Kiandra was temporarily operating out of Cowper's store on New Chum Hill. By May 1860 Cowper and Goulstone's general store had been established at the diggings, described as "undoubtedly the neatest built house in Kiandra". Cowper became a prominent member of the community at the Kiandra diggings, as a magistrate and leading local agitation to improve roads and postal communication. At one stage during 1860 the large body of miners at Kiandra were without police protection. Cowper, as magistrate, took charge of the situation and "swore in special constables, maintained order, and decided disputes, and kept things going till a new staff of officers was sent by the Government". In October 1860 the telegraph line from Tumut to Kiandra was opened, with the telegraphic equipment being temporarily placed in Cowper's store.

==== Member for The Tumut ====
In May 1860, Daniel Deniehy was elected in a by-election as the representative for The Tumut electorate after the resignation of the previous member, but at about the same time he was also elected in a by-election for the East Macquarie electorate. Deniehy opted for the East Macquarie seat, so the Tumut electorate remained vacant. At noon on 1 November 1860, on the verandah of the Tumut Court-house, nominations to represent the Tumut electorate in the New South Wales Legislative Assembly were called for by the local returning-officer. Cowper had earlier arrived from Adelong, accompanied by "a number of gentlemen" from that township and preceded by a brass band playing 'See, the conquering hero comes'. Three candidates were nominated, Cowper, John Egan and Thomas Mate, of which Cowper was the only one present. During the nomination speeches, Cowper was described as "a bustling business man, one who has some stake in the Southern district, and who, to all intents and purposes, may be reckoned one of ourselves". At the conclusion of the speeches, those who had nominated and seconded the two other candidates withdrew their nominations and encouraged support for Cowper. The proceedings concluded with the returning-officer calling for a show of hands for each candidate. No hands were raised for the two absent candidates, so Cowper was declared in the by-election as the member for the Tumut electorate.

Soon after Cowper's appointment as representative of The Tumut electorate, the New South Wales Legislative Assembly was dissolved on the advice of the Colonial Secretary, John Robertson. At the colonial election of December 1860 Cowper was re-elected unopposed for the seat of Tumut. After the December 1860 election, at the first session of the New South Wales parliament on 10 January 1861, the previous Premier, John Robertson, announced that the position of first Minister of the government would be taken by Charles Cowper (senior).

A proclamation dated 29 August 1861 and published in the New South Wales Government Gazette declared that the person holding the office of Clerk of the Executive Council was "capable of being elected a Member of the Legislative Assembly". In late August 1861 Cowper (junior) replaced Edward C. Merewether as Clerk of the Executive Council, a position with a salary of £600 per annum. With Cowper being the son of the Premier and an elected member of the Legislative Assembly, an article in The Sydney Morning Herald made the point that his appointment rendered the previously apolitical administrative position as political, describing it as "a quasi Ministerial position, although not having charge of any public department". Cowper's appointment as Clerk to the Executive Council was the subject of newspaper speculation and criticism, some of which included suggestions of nepotism. The controversial appointment necessitated a by-election, held in September 1861. On this occasion Daniel Deniehy ran against Cowper for the Tumut electorate, but Cowper was again elected. Despite his senior position within the government, Cowper was not a member of the Cabinet.

==== Member for Orange ====
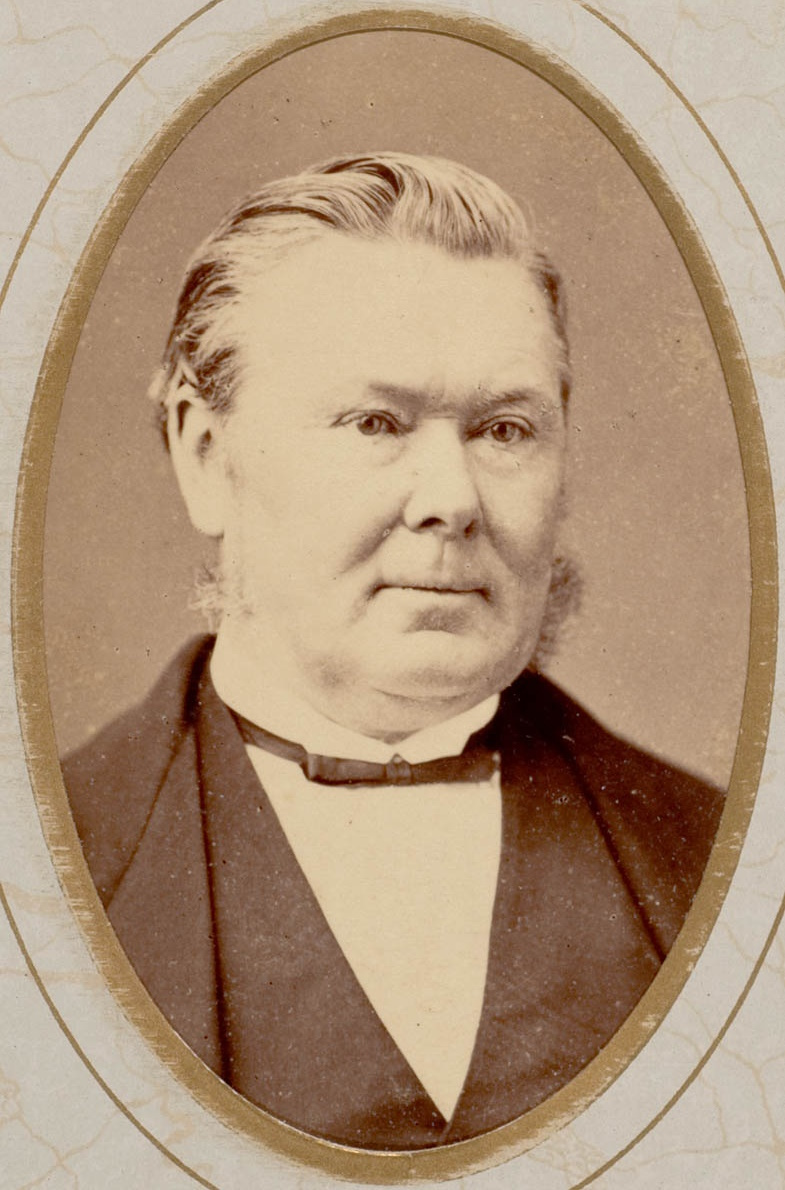
James Martin, defeated by Charles Cowper (junior) in two polls.

In October 1863, the Cowper government was defeated in parliament after criticism of the ministry's financial management. After the defeat of the government, James Martin was able to form a ministry which was sworn in by the Governor on October 16. With the formation of the new ministry, by-elections were required for each of the members of the Legislative Assembly who accepted ministerial positions. Soon after the writs were issued for the by-elections, Cowper (junior) resigned as representative for the Tumut electorate in order to contest the Orange by-election against Martin (his father's political opponent). An editorial in The Sydney Morning Herald was critical of the decision, describing the younger Cowper as "the mere mouthpiece of his parent", adding: "He is merely the representative of the firm of Cowper and Son, and not trading on his own account". The writer accused Cowper (senior) of putting his son in an odious position, permitting him "to sacrifice the duty he owed to the constituency for which he was elected, in order that he might disturb the course of that very representative Government of which Mr. Cowper professes to be the warmest admirer".

On 2 November 1863, at the nominations for the by-election for the seat of Orange, Martin told the assembled voters "I do not regard Mr. Cowper, jun., as my opponent", adding: "He is much too insignificant in every way to be the real opponent, and is merely the catspaw put forward in order to throw impediments in the way of the Ministry". The poll for the seat of Orange was held on November 4, at which Cowper won by a narrow majority of sixteen votes.^{[B]} Six days after the Orange poll, Martin was nominated as a candidate for The Tumut electorate, which had been vacated by Cowper. A second candidate named C. D. O'Connell was also nominated. The by-election was held on November 16, with Martin winning the seat by a sizeable majority.

In early June 1864, it was reported that Cowper had met with a serious accident while travelling to Fort Bourke on the Darling River, resulting in a fractured kneecap. He returned to Orange in an American waggon to obtain medical assistance.

==== Member for The Tumut ====
At the New South Wales colonial election held from late-November 1864 to January 1865, James Martin, the Attorney-General and Premier of New South Wales, was once again defeated by Cowper (junior) in a poll. Cowper went up against Martin for the Tumut electorate. Nominations for the seat of Tumut were called for on 8 December 1864, with both Cowper and Martin put forward as candidates. The polling was held on 10 December 1864, which Cowper won with 54 percent of the votes. After the election the Cowper faction commanded a majority of members in the Legislative Assembly, with Cowper's father forming his fourth government ministry. After the election, Cowper (junior) began a pattern of absence from parliament that became the subject of widespread criticism. Later newspaper commentary asserted that he "was returned to Parliament somewhat against his will, and in a fit of overflowing loyalty" to his father.

==== Parliamentary absences ====
Cowper acquired pastoral properties "in a remote part of Queensland, to which he betook himself". He was principally involved in the acquisition of pastoral land in the Warrego district of southern Queensland, but his activities extended from the Warrego to Cooper's Creek. On 23 September 1865, an editorial in The Burrangong Argus was critical of the "continued absence" of Cowper "from his place in the Assembly", declaring that "the Tumut electorate has been virtually disenfranchised for the past twelve months". In December 1865 the Empire newspaper reported that seventy members were present in the Legislative Assembly, the largest number ever assembled. The only absentees were the members for The Tumut and The Gwydir electorates, Charles Cowper (junior) and Thomas G. Dangar. Cowper had previously been absent for the whole of the previous session of parliament.

Cowper's absence from parliament continued and in April 1866 it was reported that he had resigned as the representative of the Tumut electorate, "having forwarded his resignation from his bush retreat". A parliamentary rule stipulated that absence from the Legislative Assembly "for one session without leave vacates the seat of a member". Cowper's resignation arrived on the last day of the parliamentary session, leaving no opportunity prior to the prorogation of Parliament for the Assembly to declare the seat vacant and the Speaker to issue a writ for a by-election. When parliament resumed on 25 July 1866, the seat held by Cowper (junior) was declared vacant upon the motion of James Martin, "in consequence of the absence of that hon. member for more than twelve months, without leave of the House". The Tumut and Adelong Times published an editorial on the news that the local electorate had been declared vacant. The writer was critical of Cowper and his "apologists", and condemnatory of the electorate "having been virtually disenfranchised for a session", adding: "We might have as well elected his stick or umbrella as himself to represent us".

=== Police Magistrate ===
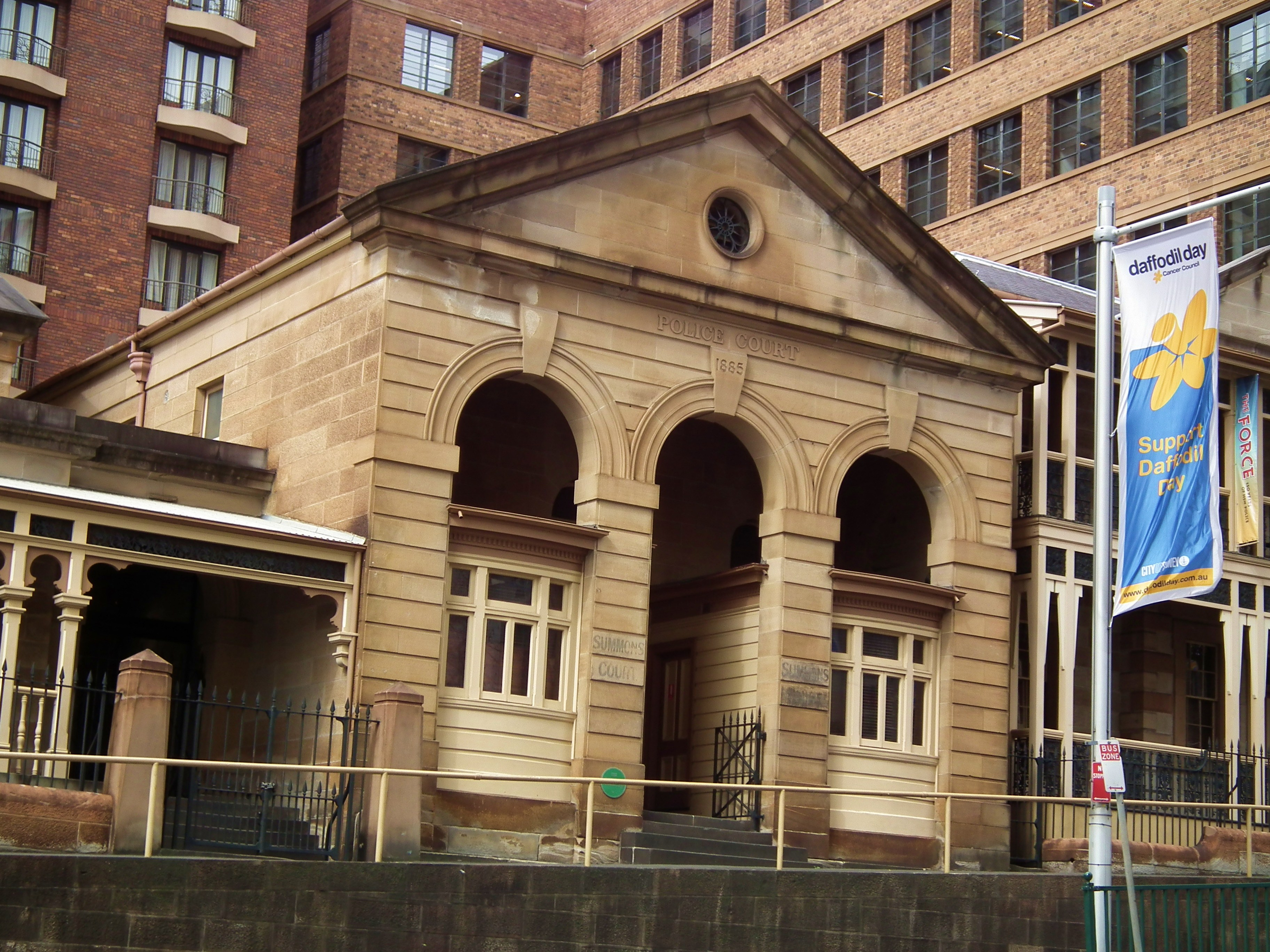
The Justice and Police Museum in Phillip Street, Sydney, previously the Water Police Court.

In January 1867, Charles Cowper (junior), of the Lower Warrego, was appointed as a justice of the peace in the colony of Queensland. In April 1868 Cowper, of 'Wahgoonoorah' station, was appointed as a Sheep Director for the district of Warrego. Cowper's pastoral business pursuits in Queensland led to financial losses due to the prolonged Queensland drought of the 1860s.

In June 1869, Charles Cowper (junior), was appointed as the Police Magistrate at Bourke on a stipend of £500 per annum. He replaced John Garrett, who was transferred to the Upper Hunter region. Cowper accepted the appointment on the condition that he be transferred to Sydney when a suitable vacancy occurred there.

On 23 May 1870, Cowper was appointed as a Water Police Magistrate in Sydney. The Water Police Court was located in Phillip Street, near Circular Quay, a sandstone building completed in 1855.^{[C]}

=== Sheriff of New South Wales ===
In July 1874, Charles Cowper was offered the position of Sheriff of the colony of New South Wales by George Wigram Allen, the Minister of Justice and Public Instruction in the first ministry of Henry Parkes. He was appointed to the position on 12 August 1874.

As Sheriff, Cowper had official chambers at the Darlinghurst Court House, as well as in every Assize Court in the colony.

One of the important duties of the office of Sheriff was the execution of prisoners who had been sentenced to death in the New South Wales court system, with the roles of hangman and assistant hangman being positions within the Sheriff's office. In 1874 the senior hangman in New South Wales was a man named John Franks. In April 1876 Franks was discovered in Hyde Park in a moribund condition; he was taken to the Sydney Infirmary where he died, aged 26 years, from "intermittent fever and debility" brought about by "habits of drunkenness and dissipation". After the death of Franks the assistant hangman, William Tucker, was promoted to senior executioner and Robert Howard was employed in the position of assistant hangman. By May 1877 Howard had been appointed as the principal hangman, a position he held for the remainder of Cowper's tenure as Sheriff. When he retired in 1896, Cowper was complimentary of his hangman: "Howard is a competent man, and everything was carried out all right by him except when he has had a bad assistant".

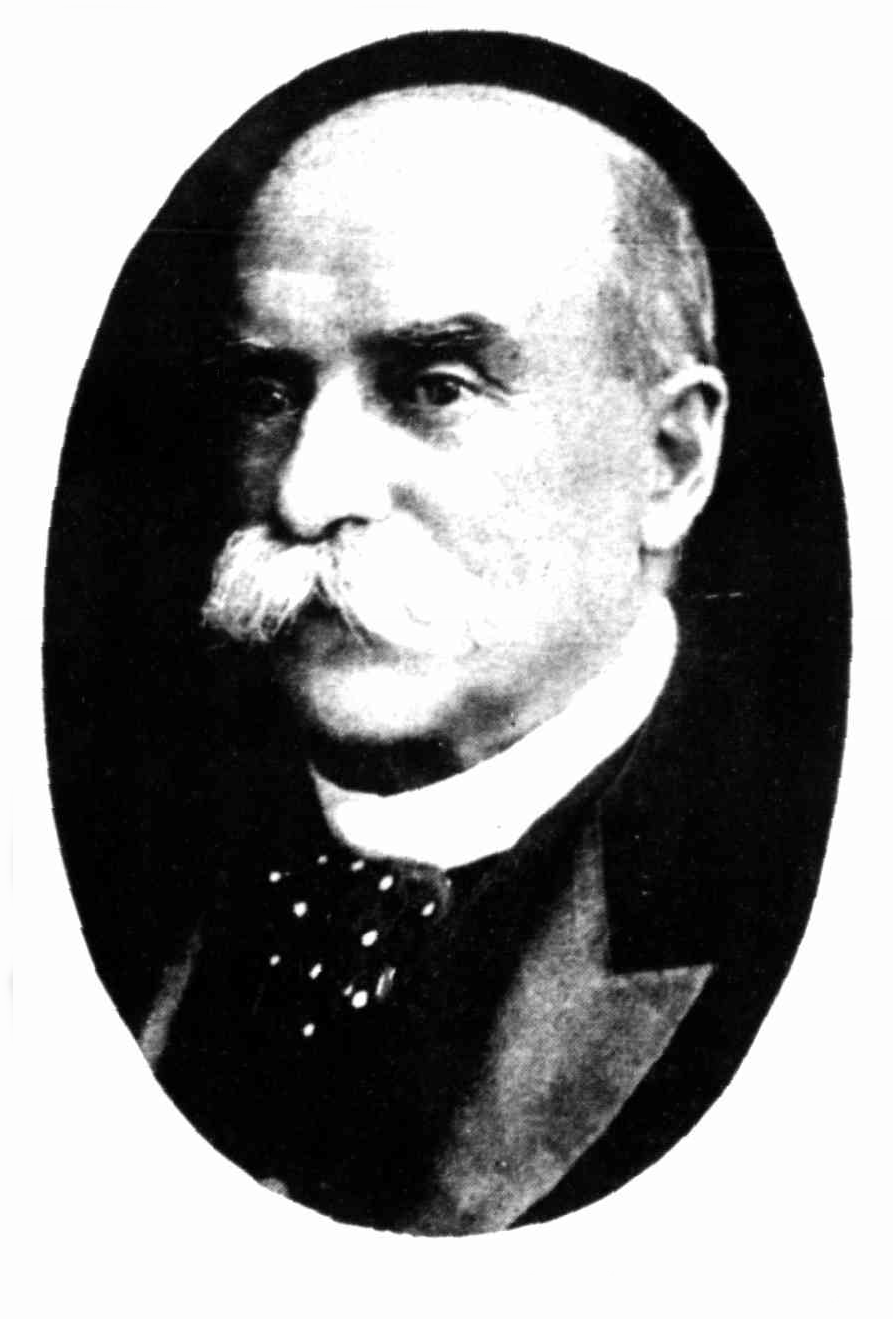
Charles Cowper (1834-1911), published in The Sydney Mail, 13 June 1906.

Cowper oversaw the amalgamation of the positions of sheriff's officer and district court bailiff in provincial towns. These positions were merged at Newcastle, Maitland and Muswellbrook in April 1888.

Cowper's wife Mary died in November 1894 at 'Werrington' in Burradoo (near Bowral), in the Southern Highlands of New South Wales. The cause of her death was "a paralytic stroke".

Cowper retired as Sheriff in July 1896. He was replaced by Cecil E. B. Maybury.

== Later life ==
Charles Cowper and Amy Bramley were married on 11 March 1897 at St. John's Anglican church in Darlinghurst. Cowper's wife was a 27-year-old divorcee, born in the Canterbury region of New Zealand.^{[D]}

In 1899, Charles and Amy Cowper left Sydney for England, where they lived until early 1903. The marriage was later described as "unfortunate", and "evidently a very unhappy one".

In April 1903, the couple arrived at Wellington in New Zealand's North Island and shortly afterwards proceeded to New Plymouth. It was here, in February 1904, that Cowper deserted his wife (as she later alleged). Amy wrote to her husband "asking whether he intended to live with her", to which he replied "that he hadn't enough to keep two, and intended to live by himself".

In May 1907, Cowper's wife Amy, then living at Dunedin, petitioned for a dissolution of her marriage "on the ground of desertion". In the Divorce Court in late March 1908 the judge granted a decree nisi in response to the petitioner, Amy Cowper, whose case had been made by affidavit. In delivering judgment, Justice Simpson expressed satisfaction that desertion had occurred, but was doubtful that it was without the consent of the petitioner or without reasonable cause or excuse. The divorce was finalised in October 1908.

Charles Cowper died on 16 November 1911 at Bowral in the Southern Highlands of New South Wales, aged 77 years, and was buried in the family vault at St. Paul's Church at Cobbitty, near Camden, southwest of Sydney. He was survived by four sons and two daughters..

== Notes ==
A.'Burrabogie' station is a pastoral holding on the lower Murrumbidgee River, in the Riverina district of New South Wales, between the present-day townships of Darlington Point and Hay. The 'Burrabogie' pastoral run, in the Murrumbidgee Pastoral District, was taken up by Chapman and Huon in the mid-1840s. Details from the New South Wales Government Gazette indicate that Charles Cowper (senior) leased 'Burrabogie' for approximately one year, in the early- to mid-1850s. Government records indicate the pastoral run was transferred from Chapman and Huon to Cowper in September 1853 and from Cowper to Walter Clarke in September 1854.

B.The results of the by-election for the seat of Orange on 4 November 1863 was: Charles Cowper, junior – 292 votes; James Martin – 276 votes. Martin won the majority of the votes at four of the five polling stations. The outlier was the Pretty Plains constituency which voted 30 to 93 against Martin, leading to his claim "that in reality he had been defeated by the 'free selection' cry that had been raised".

C.The Water Police was established by legislation in 1840. It was responsible for law enforcement relating to sailors, shipping, wharves and cargoes.

D.Amy Rose Clarissa Bramley was born in June 1869 at Flaxton in the Waimakariri District of New Zealand's South Island (Canterbury region), the daughter of William Bramley and Elizabeth (née Luxton). In December 1888 she married Oscar Stahl at New Plymouth in the Taranaki region of the North Island. Shortly after they were married, Stahl deserted his wife and eventually relocated to Australia, where he "represented himself as a doctor in the German army". Stahl operated a private school at Warren in central New South Wales. In November 1891 Stahl, under the name of Mauritus Lorenzo, married Harriett Davidson at Raglan, near Bathurst. Stahl was later charged with bigamy, for which he pleaded guilty at the Bathurst Quarter Sessions in July 1896. Amy applied for a divorce and a decree nisi was granted in the Sydney Divorce Court in August 1896. The decree absolute was granted in September 1896. After her divorce from Charles Cowper in March 1908, Amy married Sidney Evans later that year in New Zealand. She died in September 1947 at Mount Eden, a suburb of Auckland.

New South Wales Legislative Assembly
Preceded by Daniel Deniehy	Member for The Tumut; 1860–1863	Succeeded by James Martin
Preceded by James Martin	Member for Orange; 1863–1864	Succeeded by William Forlonge
Preceded by James Martin	Member for The Tumut; 1864–1866	Succeeded by Edward Brown

== See also ==
- Members of the New South Wales Legislative Assembly
- 1859–1860
- 1860–1864
- 1864–1869
- Results of New South Wales state elections
- 1860 (Tumut by-election)
- 1860 (Tumut)
- 1961 (Tumut by-election)
- 1863 (Orange by-election)
- 1864 (The Tumut)
