= Tumut & Adelong Times =

Newspaper in New South Wales, Australia

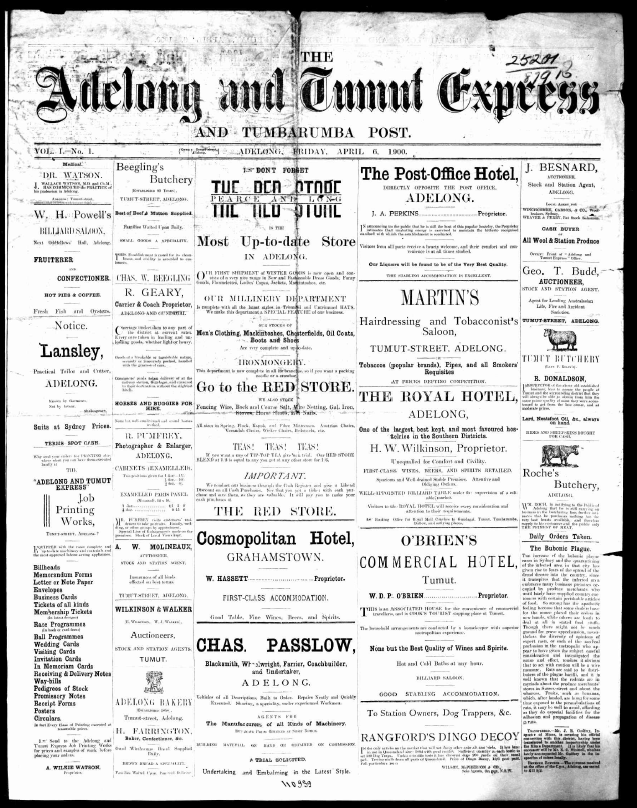
The front page of the Adelong and Tumut Express and Tumbarumba Post on 6 April 1900.

The Tumut and Adelong Times and Batlow District News is an English language newspaper currently published in Tumut, New South Wales. It was first published as The Tumut and Adelong Times and has absorbed Adelong and Tumut Express and Batlow District News, Tumut-Batlow-Adelong District News, The Tumut Advocate and Farmers & Settlers' Adviser and The Adelong Argus, Tumut and Gundagai Advertiser.

== History ==
The Tumut and Adelong Times was first published in 1864 and changed its name to The Tumut and Adelong Times and Batlow District News in 1949. Four other newspapers have served the Riverina of New South Wales over the same period and each has subsequently been absorbed by The Tumut and Adelong Times and Batlow District News.

- 1864 - The Tumut and Adelong Times is first published.
- 1866 - The Tumut and Adelong Times and Gundagai Advertiser - name changed
- 1888 - The Adelong Argus, Tumut and Gundagai Advertiser is first published.
- 1900 - Adelong and Tumut Express and Tumbarumba Post is first published.
- 1903 - The Tumut Advocate and Farmers & Settlers' Adviser is first published.
- 1925 - The Tumut and Adelong Times absorbs The Tumut Advocate and Farmers & Settlers' Adviser.
- 1925 - Adelong and Tumut Express and Tumbarumba Post changes name to Adelong and Tumut express.
- 1925 - Adelong and Tumut Express absorbs The Adelong Argus, Tumut and Gundagai Advertiser.
- 1932 - Tumut-Batlow-Adelong District News is first published.
- 1942 - The Tumut and Adelong Times absorbs Tumut-Batlow-Adelong District News.
- 1949 - The Tumut and Adelong Times changes name to The Tumut and Adelong Times and Batlow District News.
- 1949 - Adelong and Tumut express changes name to Adelong and Tumut Express and Batlow District News.
- 1955 - The Tumut and Adelong Times and Batlow District News absorbs Adelong and Tumut Express and Batlow District News.

== Digitisation ==
The various versions of the paper have been digitised as part of the Australian Newspapers Digitisation Program project hosted by the National Library of Australia.

== See also ==
- List of newspapers in New South Wales
- List of newspapers in Australia

== Bibliography ==
- Country conscience : a history of the New South Wales provincial press, 1841-1995 / by Rod Kirkpatrick, Canberra City, A.C.T. : Infinite Harvest Publishing, 2000
- Looking good : the changing appearance of Australian newspapers / by Victor Isaacs, for the Australian Newspapers History Group, Middle Park, Qld. : Australian Newspaper History Group, 2007.
- Press timeline : Select chronology of significant Australian press events to 2011 / Compiled by Rod Kirkpatrick for the Australian Newspaper History Group
- Australian Newspaper History : A Bibliography / Compiled by Victor Isaacs, Rod Kirkpatrick and John Russell, Middle Park, Qld. : Australian Newspaper History Group, 2004
- Newspapers in Australian libraries : a union list. 4th ed.
