= Robert Donaldson (politician) =

Irish born Australian politician and inspector of Aborigines

Robert Thomas Donaldson (1851 – 5 August 1936) was an Irish-born Australian politician.

He was born in County Westmeath to farmer Thomas Willett Donaldson and Barbara Shafgotch. The family emigrated to Australia around 1863 and Donaldson worked as a station hand and prospector in northern and central Queensland. After a visit to Britain in 1878 he returned to Queensland to become a railway construction inspector. On 25 July 1882 he married Edith Meek in Sydney. He moved to New South Wales permanently in 1883 to become contractors manager in the construction of the Cootamundra-Gundagai railway. He settled in Tumut, where he became alderman and later mayor.

In 1898 he was elected to the New South Wales Legislative Assembly as the independent member for Tumut. He joined the Progressive Party in 1901 and returned to independent status following that party's collapse in 1907. Having transferred to the seat of Wynyard in 1904, he contested Yass in 1913 as the candidate of the Country Party Association, but was defeated.

From 1915 to 1929 he was Inspector of Aborigines, under the auspices of the Board for the Protection of Aborigines, in which he implemented the board's policy of removing Aboriginal children from their families, now known as the Stolen Generations. The Australian Dictionary of Biography describes Donaldson as "feared and hated by two generations of Aboriginals throughout New South Wales. In particular he was never forgiven for the raid on Cumeroogunga Aboriginal station in 1919".

Donaldson died at Randwick in 1936 (aged 85).

New South Wales Legislative Assembly
Preceded by Travers Jones	Member for Tumut; 1898–1904	Abolished
New seat	Member for Wynyard; 1904–1913	Abolished
