= 1860 East Macquarie colonial by-election =

By-election in New South Wales, Australia

A by-election was held for the New South Wales Legislative Assembly electorate of East Macquarie on 10 May 1860 because of the resignation of Thomas Hawkins.

== Dates ==
Date	Event
1 April 1860	Thomas Hawkins resigned.
13 April 1860	Writ of election issued by the Speaker of the Legislative Assembly.
30 April 1860	Nominations
10 May 1860	Polling day
23 May 1860	Return of writ

== Result ==
1860 East Macquarie by-election Thursday 10 May
Candidate	Votes	%
Daniel Deniehy (elected)	496	68.7
John McGuigan	215	29.8
Henry Dangar	11	1.5
Total formal votes	722	100.0
Informal votes	0	0.0
Turnout	722	54.6

== See also ==
- Electoral results for the district of East Macquarie
- List of New South Wales state by-elections
