= Arthur Holroyd =

Australian lawyer and politician

Arthur Todd Holroyd
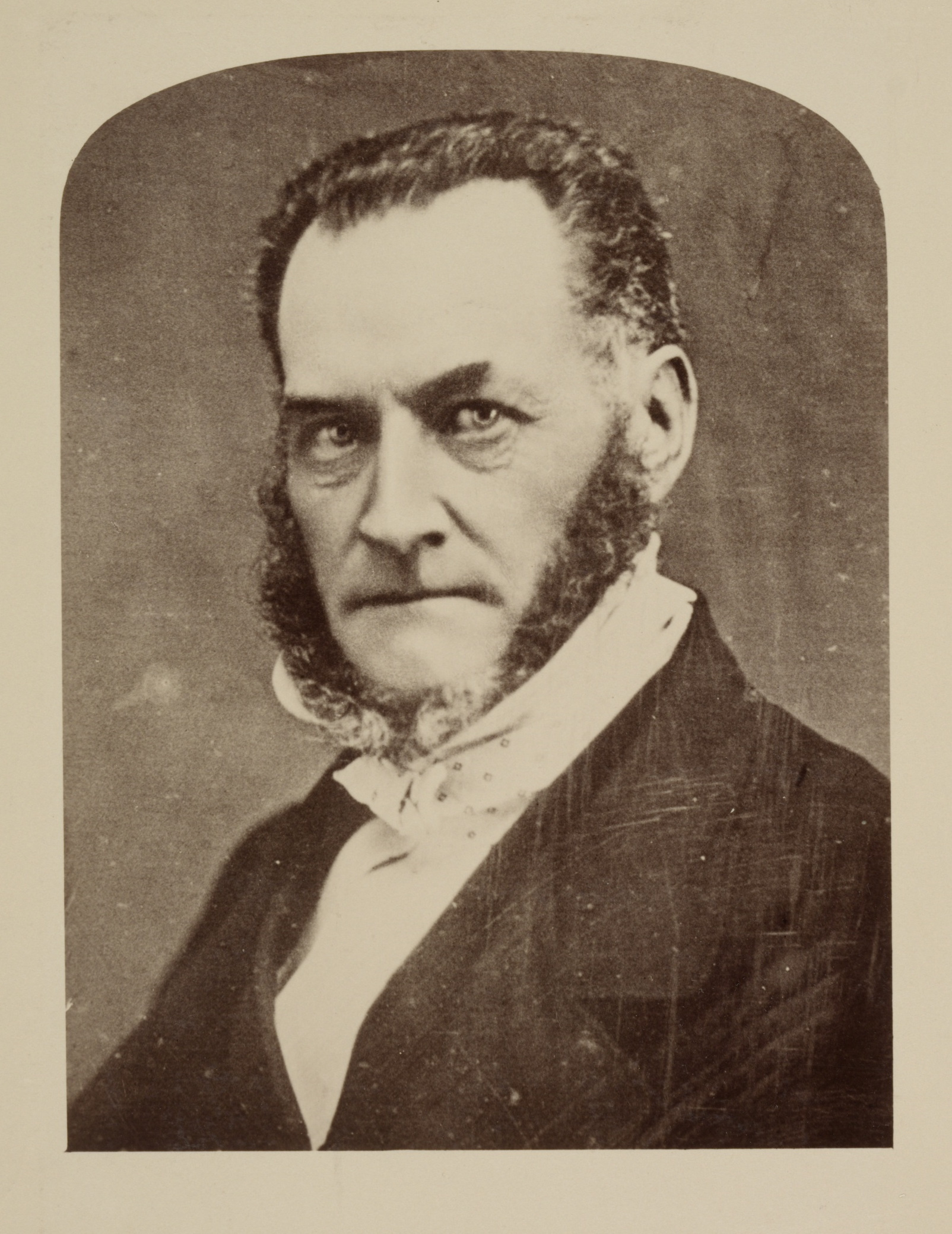

Member for Western Boroughs (New South Wales Legislative Council)
- In office 1 September 1851 – 29 February 1856

Member for Western Boroughs (NSW Legislative Assembly)
- In office 29 March 1856 – 19 December 1857

Member for Parramatta (NSW Legislative Assembly)
- In office 10 April 1861 – 10 November 1864

Secretary for Public Works
- In office 16 October 1863 – 2 February 1865

Personal details
- Born: 1 December 1806 London
- Died: 15 June 1887 (aged 80) Merrylands, New South Wales

Arthur Todd Holroyd (1 December 1806 – 15 June 1887) was an Australian lawyer and politician. He was a member of the New South Wales Legislative Council between 1851 and 1856. He was also a member of the New South Wales Legislative Assembly for two periods between 1856 and 1857 and again between 1861 and 1864.

== Biography ==
=== Early life ===
Arthur Todd Holroyd was born in London on 1 December 1806, the youngest child of the merchant Stephen Holroyd and Elizabeth (née Lofthouse). His father died in January 1810 when Arthur was aged three years.

After a preliminary education in private schools, Arthur Holroyd was sent to Ripon Grammar School, North Yorkshire, "for a couple of years". In 1824 he began to study medicine in Winchester. Shortly afterwards Holroyd became a pupil at the Webb-street School of Anatomy at Southwark, London. In May 1827 he went to Christ's College at the University of Cambridge and then to Edinburgh University, from where attained the Doctor of Medicine degree in 1830.

Arthur Holroyd married Sophia Abbs on 6 June 1830 at Whitburn, county Durham. In May 1831 a daughter, Emily, was born to the couple.

In 1831 Holroyd commenced practice as a physician in London, “but not finding the prospects of the medical profession as lucrative or satisfactory as he had anticipated”, he decided to give up medicine and study as a lawyer. He was admitted to Lincoln's Inn in January 1835. After the first year of his admission, however, Holroyd decided to suspend his legal studies, having "determined to quit England for a time, and travel".

=== Travels on the Upper Nile ===
Holroyd left England in June 1836 and proceeded to Rome, from where, after a short time, he travelled to Alexandria in Egypt. Leaving Alexandria, he travelled up the Nile as far as the Second Cataract (near the border of modern Egypt and Sudan), arriving there in early December 1836 with his interpreter, Hajji Soliman, and Ali, "an inferior domestic". Holroyd took frequent opportunities to inscribe his surname and the year into the ancient monuments he visited. At the rock-cut temples at Abu Simbel, for instance, alongside the Second Nile Cataract (now relocated to the western bank of Lake Nasser), Holroyd inscribed his surname and "1836", enclosed in a rectangular border, at the entrance to the great hall. Beneath Holroyd's graffito at this location is also etched the name "Hajji Soliman" (Holroyd's interpreter). At Wadi Halfa at the Second Cataract, Holroyd decided to continue further south into the region then known in Arabic as Beled-es-Sudan (Land of the Blacks). Holroyd hired camels and travelled along the west bank of the Nile, frequently stopping along the road "to examine all the antiquarian remains".

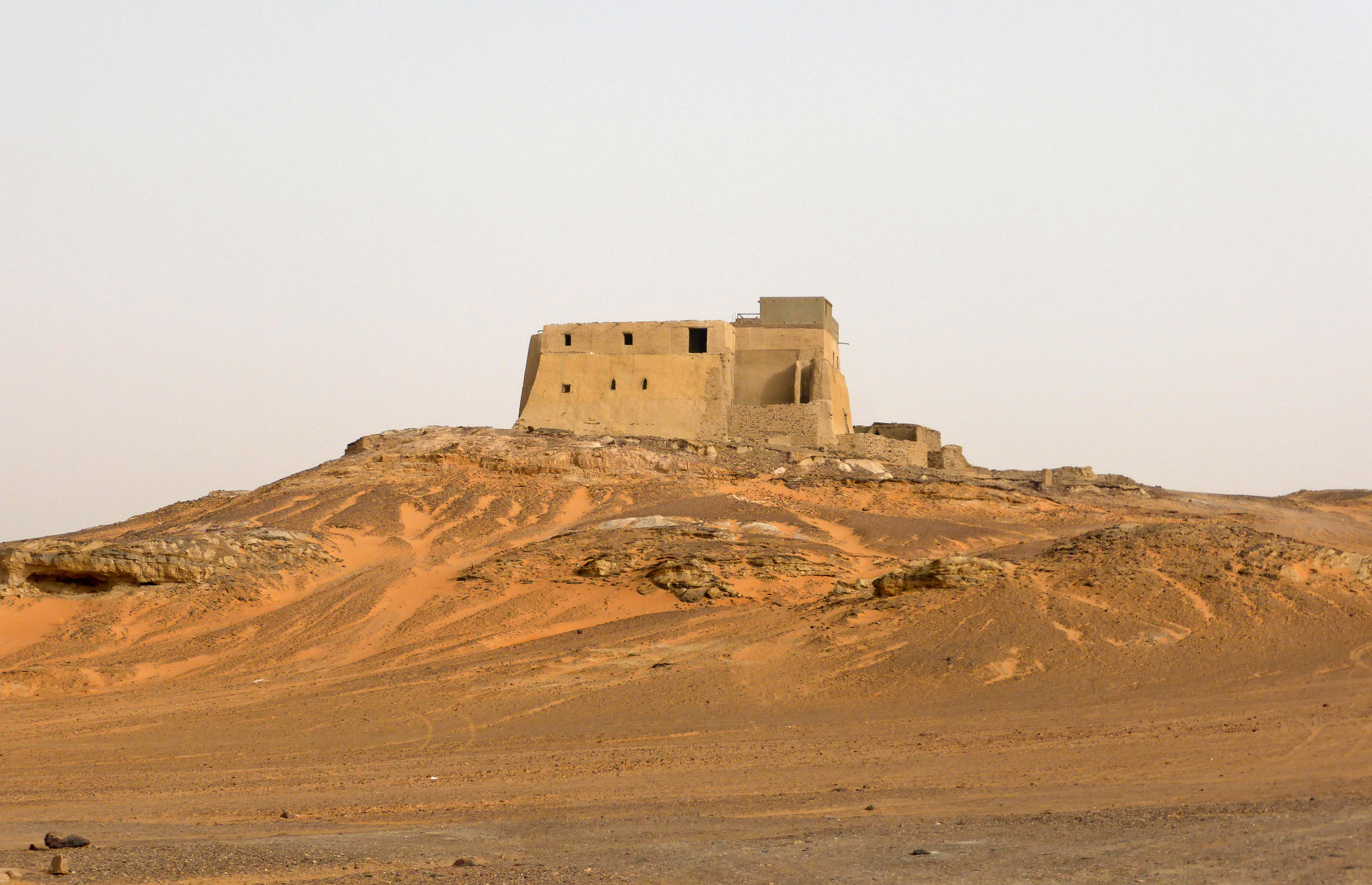
The Throne Hall at Old Dongola, Sudan, overlooking the deserted town and the Nile valley; when Holroyd was there in 1836 this building was being used as a mosque.

In late December 1836 Holroyd and his party arrived at Dongola, an Egyptian outpost with a population of about six thousand (including 800 troops and their wives and families). After procuring a boat Holroyd travelled further up the river, 50 miles south to Old Dongola, once an important city of Nubia but now largely abandoned to the shifting sands. Holroyd recorded that Old Dongola had about 300 inhabitants and "the most striking object here is a mosque on rather an elevated site, from the top of which there is an extensive prospect of the arid Desert and meandering Nile". He then travelled further up the river as it turned towards the east, to Ambukol (near Korti), arriving there on 8 January 1837. At Ambukol Holroyd had “a severe attack of fever” requiring him to rest for several weeks.

Holroyd decided to cross the Bayuda Desert rather than follow the great bend of the Nile, where the route of the river turns to the east and then north-east, before inclining back to the south at Abu Hamad. With hired camels Holroyd and his men crossed the desert in seven days, travelling south-south-east from Ambukol. At the wells of Bayuda, about half-way across, they replenished their water supply. Holroyd commented: "The water which we had brought from the Nile was putrid and nauseous, and we were glad to avail ourselves of the opportunity of procuring a fresh supply". They arrived at El Hajir on Nile (just above the Sixth Cataract) on 31 January. Following the course of the river, the next day Holroyd and his men arrived at Khartoum at the confluence of the White Nile, flowing north from Lake Victoria, and the Blue Nile, flowing west from Lake Tana in Ethiopia.

Khartoum was the administrative centre of Beled-es-Sudan, under the Egyptian governor Khurshid Pasha, and "a place of considerable trade, being convenient as a rendezvous for the slave-caravans from Abyssinia, Sennar and Kordofan". Khartoum's population was about fifteen thousand, including 1,600 soldiers and their families. On 11 February Holroyd left Khartoum to travel up the Blue Nile, “Khurshid Pasha having provided me with an excellent boat for that purpose”. After ten days travel he arrived at Sennar where he remained for nearly a fortnight, in a house in the barracks precinct provided by the local military commandant. On 2 March 1837 Holroyd left Sennar, travelling downstream to Wad Madani, from where he and his men crossed overland from the Blue Nile to the White Nile, 86 miles to the west.

Holroyd reached the White Nile on 15 March. From Kajebi on the west bank, having procured camels and a guide, he headed in a south-west direction to cross the Habshábeh desert to El Obeid, the capital of the Kordofan district. Holroyd and his party arrived at El Obeid on 30 March 1837, remaining there for sixteen days during which time Holroyd recorded detailed observations of the township and its 30,000 inhabitants. He was the first Englishman to visit the Kordofan region. Holroyd particularly noted details of the slave trade being carried out, with troops whose pay was in arrears being compelled to capture and sell slaves in lieu of wages. He described a distribution of slaves he witnessed as “a more heart-rending scene cannot be imagined”. In mid-April he travelled back to the White Nile and followed its course back to Cairo. In Cairo Holroyd protested to the Egyptian Government against the slave-trading he had witnessed during his journey on the Upper Nile and the Kordofan region.

Holroyd was familiar with the Arabic language and travelled through Sinai, Palestine and Syria.

On 25 February 1839 in London Holroyd delivered a paper to the Royal Geographical Society entitled 'Notes on a Journey to Kordofán, in 1836-7'. He was elected a Fellow of the Society and his paper was subsequently published in the Society's journal.

=== Lincoln's Inn ===
Holroyd was called to the bar of Lincoln's Inn in May 1841, immediately after which he attended the West Riding Sessions, and was admitted as a member of the Western Circuit Bar.

=== New Zealand ===
In the early 1840s Arthur Holroyd "determined to emigrate and try his fortune in the colonies". Arthur Holroyd and his daughter Emily departed from London aboard the barque Mary as cabin passengers, arriving at Wellington, New Zealand, on 9 August 1843. Other passengers on the voyage were Robert Hart and his brother George Hart; Holroyd and Robert Hart became partners soon afterwards. Holroyd was admitted as a member of the New Zealand bar shortly after his arrival. By September 1843 he was practising as a solicitor and barrister in the partnership of Messrs. Holroyd and Hart of Te Aro, Wellington. Holroyd remained in New Zealand until September 1845.

=== Australia ===
On 12 October 1845 Holroyd, together with a “man servant” and his daughter Emily, arrived at Sydney aboard the brig Bee from Wellington, New Zealand. When he left New Zealand, Holroyd had intended to proceed to India, planning to remain in Sydney only as long as necessary to procure a passage. After his arrival, however, he decided to remain in the colony. On Friday, 31 October 1845, Arthur Holroyd moved for his own admission as a barrister of the Supreme Court of New South Wales. He submitted an affidavit detailing his career as a barrister in England and New Zealand, after which Holroyd was admitted to the Sydney Bar, the Chief Justice of the Supreme Court commenting that he “had established his claim to admission most satisfactorily”. By December 1845 Holroyd began practicing his profession at Bathurst.

=== Colonial parliament ===
In 1851, prior to the establishment of responsible self-government, Holroyd was elected to the semi-elective Legislative Council. He represented the electorate of Western Boroughs (including Bathurst and Carcoar) until the granting of responsible self-government in 1856. Subsequently, at the first election under the new constitution he was elected to the Legislative Assembly as the member for the same seat. He was defeated by six votes at the next election in 1858. Holroyd re-entered parliament as one of the two members for Parramatta at an 1861 by-election caused by the resignation of James Byrnes. However, Byrnes defeated him at the subsequent general election. He then retired from political life.

In 1855 Holroyd was appointed as a Director of the Australian Mutual Provident Society. Holroyd had been living at Erskineville while he was in Sydney. In March 1855 he purchased the 'Sherwood' estate from Dr. William Sherwin, consisting of 320 acres of land located about two miles from Parramatta (in the present suburb of Merrylands). Holroyd commenced building the house, 'Sherwood Lodge', soon afterwards. The estate was renamed 'Sherwood Scrubs'.

Holroyd was the Secretary for Public Works in the first government of James Martin. He held this position for 15 months but resigned after being accused by William Arnold of accepting a bribe to appoint an associate to the bench of magistrates. A parliamentary commission found no truth in this accusation.

=== Supreme Court ===
Holroyd was appointed as a Master of the New South Wales Supreme Court on 11 May 1866, initially as the master in equity, before adding master in lunacy on 16 May 1879, serving in both roles until 19 January 1885. He was appointed an acting judge of the Supreme Court in April 1879, to preside at civil and criminal trials at Dubbo, only sitting for three days from 2 to 5 April 1879. While on the bench, he was accused of displaying "extraordinary behaviour" but this was considered to be a product of his short temper rather than evidence of misconduct.

=== Private life ===
Holroyd's wife, Sophia, who had remained in England, died in April 1868 at Barnet in north London, aged 58 years. Arthur Holroyd and Elizabeth Armstrong were married on 5 August 1868 in the Parramatta Registry Office.

In about August 1867 a drain pipe and tile manufactory was established at Holroyd's estate, 'Sherwood Scrubs'. In February 1871 the Sherwood Drain and Tile Works employed two men and five boys under the manager Elias Asten.

Holroyd was a prominent Freemason and in 1867-77 was district grand master of the English constitution. He had a notable collection of African and Aboriginal arms and curiosities.

Holroyd was “well known as an enthusiast in farming matters”. By the early 1870s Holroyd had established a herd of Zebu cattle at his estate, as well as Dorking and Toulouse geese and Albert and Berkshire pigs. There were twenty acres of gardens, including a large orchard.

In 1872 he was largely responsible for establishing the municipality of Prospect and Sherwood (Holroyd) and was its first mayor. The Prospect and Sherwood Municipality was incorporated in 1872, with Arthur Holroyd as an alderman and its first mayor.

With a bowling green of his own, Holroyd published a pamphlet on bowling and its rules in 1874 and was patron of the New South Wales Bowling Association.

Holroyd was a trustee of the Agricultural Society of New South Wales and the Sydney Grammar School, an original fellow of St. Paul's College, University of Sydney, and a committee member of the Union Club.

As the area surrounding his estate was opened up for sale and subdivision, Holroyd began to sell of sections of his land. Merrylands railway station opened in July 1878, named at the suggestion of Holroyd after “a family possession on the Guildford Road, England”.

Arthur Todd Holroyd died at his residence, 'Sherwood Scrubs' near Parramatta, on 15 June 1887, aged 80 years. His death was described as being “chiefly from the effects of old age, though he had been ailing for some time previous to his decease”. He was buried at Rookwood cemetery.

In May 1889 the estate of Arthur Todd Holroyd was subject to a Sequestration Order under the Bankruptcy Act. In July 1894 accounts with plans of distribution were filed in the Office of the Registrar in Bankruptcy in Sydney, showing the payment of dividends up to two and a half pence in the pound “on all proved debts”.

== Legacy ==
In October 1926 the Prospect and Sherwood Council voted to change the name of their municipality to 'Holroyd' after Arthur Holroyd, the first Mayor of the municipality. In January 1991 the Municipality of Holroyd became the City of Holroyd. The suburb of Merrylands was named after his former English home.

Parliament of New South Wales
New South Wales Legislative Council
New district	Member for Western Boroughs; September 1851 – February 1856	Succeeded by Bicameral parliament introduced
New South Wales Legislative Assembly
Preceded by Transfer of representation	Member for Western Boroughs; March 1856 – December 1857	Succeeded by Henry Rotton
Preceded by James Byrnes	Member for Parramatta; April 1861 – November 1864; Served alongside: John Lackey	Succeeded by James Byrnes
Political offices
Preceded by William Arnold	Secretary for Public Works; October 1863 – February 1865	Succeeded by William Arnold
Civic offices
New title	Mayor of Prospect and Sherwood; 1872 – 1875	Succeeded by John Good
