= Daniel Deniehy =

Australian politician (1828–1865)

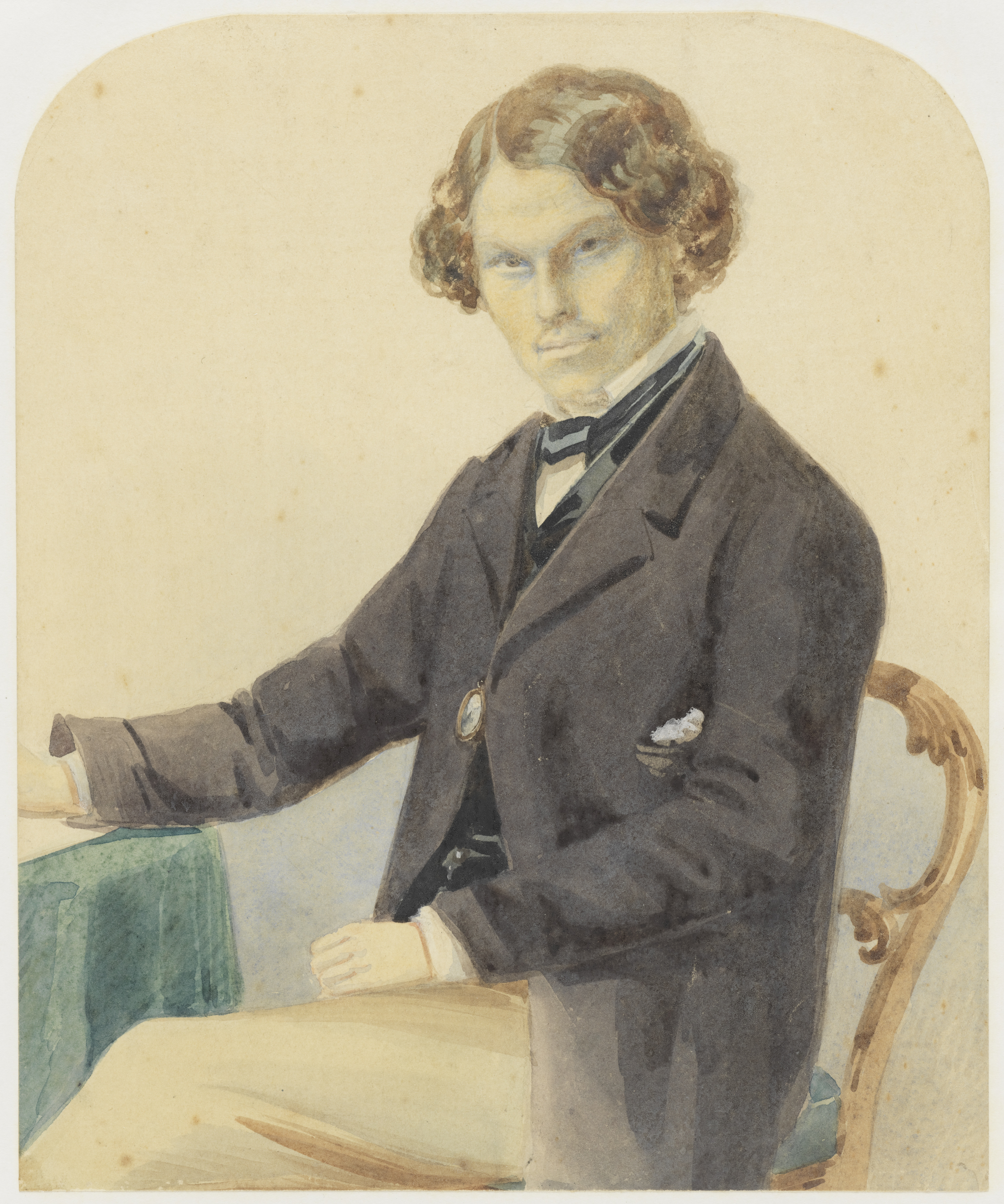

Member of the New South Wales Legislative Assembly for Argyle
- In office 1857–1859

Member of the New South Wales Legislative Assembly for East Macquarie
- In office 1860

Personal details
- Born: 18 August 1828 Sydney
- Died: 22 October 1865 (aged 37) Bathurst, New South Wales
- Occupation: solicitor and journalist

Daniel Henry Deniehy (18 August 1828 – 22 October 1865) was an Australian journalist, orator and politician, and early advocate of democracy in colonial New South Wales.

== Early life ==
Deniehy was born in Sydney, the son of Henry and Mary Deniehy, former convicts of Irish birth who had prospered in the colony after their term had expired. Deniehy was educated at the best schools Sydney then had to offer, including Sydney College, and completed his education in England at his father's expense. He travelled in Europe and visited Ireland, where he met leaders of the Young Ireland party. He was influenced by both English Chartism and Irish nationalism. Returning to Sydney in 1844, he studied law and became a solicitor in 1851.

== Career ==
Meanwhile, Deniehy became a leading figure in Sydney's small but lively literary world and in radical politics; artist Adelaide Ironside was an associate. Deniehy was a follower of the radical leader John Dunmore Lang (despite Lang's violent dislike of the Irish and of Roman Catholicism), and a member of Lang's organisation, the Australian League. He practised law in Goulburn 1854–58, in Sydney 1858–62, in Melbourne 1862–64 and in Bathurst 1865. In all these places he was active in local politics and journalism.

Like Lang, Deniehy was an advocate of extended democracy in the emerging political systems of the Australian colonies. He joined the opposition to the 1853 New South Wales Constitution Bill, which would have created a powerful unelected upper house and limited the franchise for the lower house to those owning substantial property. He was active in the New South Wales Electoral Reform League, which advocated manhood suffrage for the lower house and reduced powers for the upper house.

Deniehy argued that the real issue was control of the vast grazing lands of inland New South Wales, which the squatter class of early settlers had seized for themselves. He accused the conservatives, led by the veteran Sydney politician William Wentworth and what Deniehy called "some dozen of his friends," of wanting to "confiscate for their own uses the finest portions of the public lands, to stereotype themselves into a standing government, so that they may retain, watch over, and protect the booty they wrest."

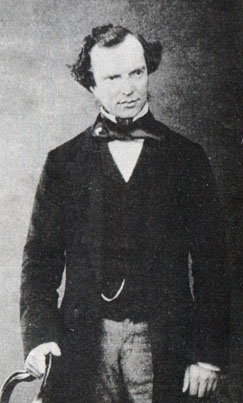
Daniel Deniehy

When Wentworth proposed creating a hereditary peerage in New South Wales, Deniehy savagely satirised it: "Here," he said, "we all know the common water mole was transferred into the duck-billed platypus, and in some distant emulation of this degeneration, I suppose we are to be favoured with a "bunyip aristocracy." (The bunyip is a mythical beast of Aboriginal legend.) His ridicule caused the idea to be dropped.

Deniehy was elected to the New South Wales Legislative Assembly in 1857, representing Argyle (the Goulburn region). In 1859 he stood for West Sydney, but was defeated. However he was successful in 1860 representing East Macquarie (the Bathurst region). As a radical democrat, he should have been an effective supporter of the liberal parliamentary leaders Charles Cowper and John Robertson, but he disliked both these leaders, and was temperamentally unable to work in a parliamentary team. He soon became an isolated loner, and began to drink heavily. With the introduction of manhood suffrage in New South Wales in 1858 his campaign for democracy was fulfilled, and he was out of sympathy with the more advanced radicals.

Members of Parliament were not paid at this time, and Deniehy always earned his living as a barrister and as a journalist. He founded and edited Southern Cross, a radical newspaper, in 1859. Deniehy had opposed the appointment of Lyttleton Bayley as Attorney General and produced a satire How I Became Attorney-General of New Barataria (Sydney, 1860) which was published in the Southern Cross. In Melbourne in 1862 he edited The Victorian for its owner, the Irish-Australian politician Charles Gavan Duffy. In Sydney he became a notable literary critic, and lectured on modern literature at the newly founded Sydney University. He was a regular contributor to the Irish-Australian newspaper The Freeman's Journal and other papers.

== Late life ==
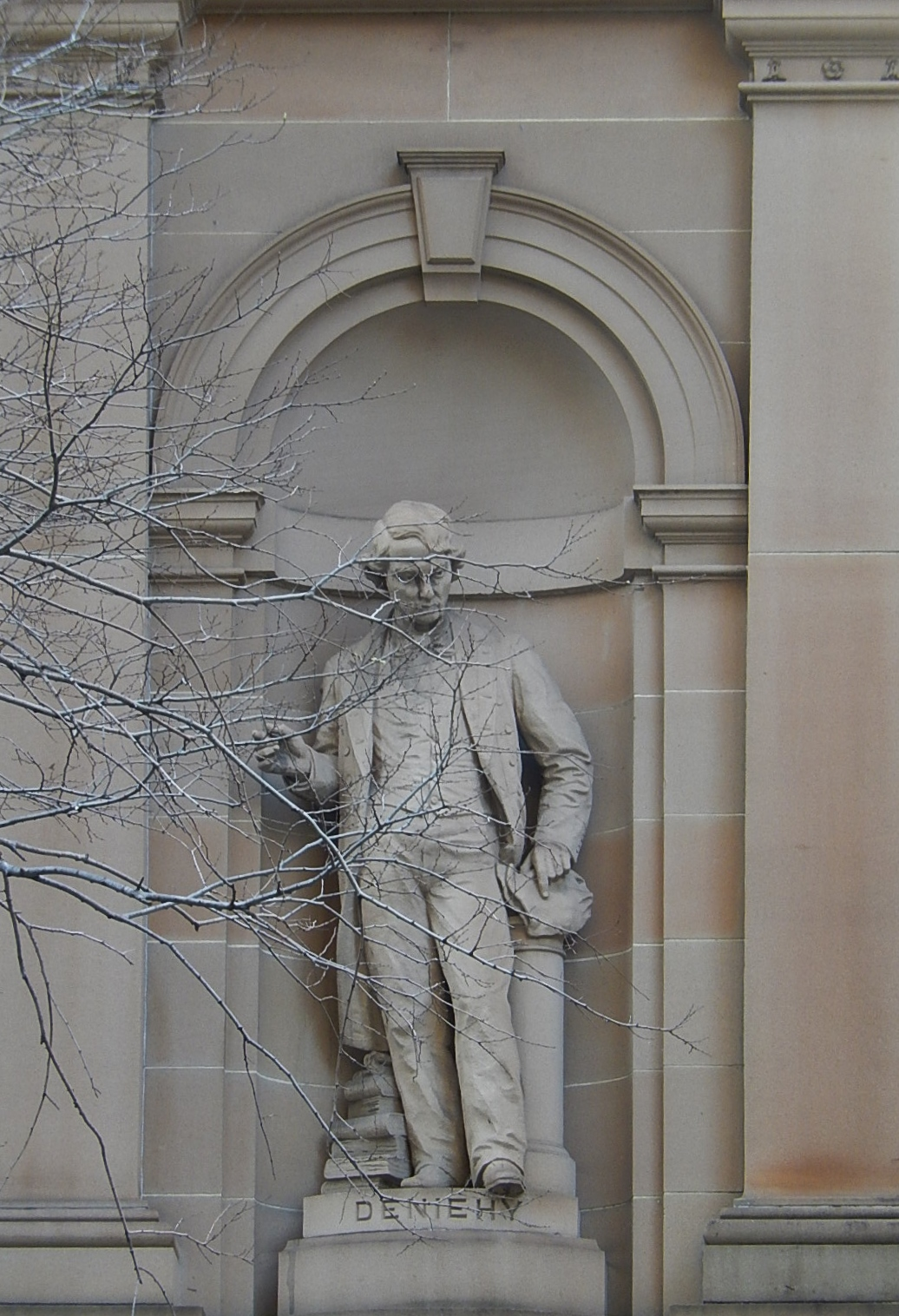
Statue of Deniehy on the Lands Department Building, Bridge Street Sydney.

Only 150 cm (five feet) tall and in poor health throughout his life, Deniehy possessed enormous energy and was a gifted orator. The Australian historian Manning Clark writes of him: "His heart was a battlefield between the cherub and the insect of sensual lust." (He married Adelaide Hoals in 1852 and had seven children in nine years). "At times his face caught a fire and beauty that looked like phases of actual transfiguration. At other times his face was coarsened by days of drunken debauchery." He died of alcoholism in Bathurst, aged only 37. In 1895 his remains were exhumed and reburied in Sydney's Waverley Cemetery, where a monument was erected over the grave. An inscription on it reads:

The vehement voice of the South
Is loud where the journalist lies
But calm hath encompassed his mouth,
And sweet is the peace in his eyes.

A statue of Deniehy, by sculptor James White, stands in a niche of the Department of Lands Building, Sydney.

New South Wales Legislative Assembly
Preceded by John Plunkett	Member for Argyle; 1857–1859	Succeeded by Terence Murray
Preceded by Thomas Hawkins	Member for East Macquarie; 1860; Served alongside: Cummings	Succeeded by William Suttor
