= Electoral district of Tumut =

Former state electoral district of New South Wales, Australia

Tumut was an electoral district for the Legislative Assembly in the Australian state of New South Wales in the Tumut area, one of 62 new districts established under the Electoral Act 1858 (NSW), in the 1858 redistribution. It replaced part of the district of Murrumbidgee which was reduced from 2 to 1 member. It was abolished in 1904 and replaced by Wynyard.

== Members for Tumut ==
Member	Party	Period
George Lang	None	1859–1860
Daniel Deniehy (Note: Daniel Deniehy was declared elected at the by-election in May 1860, however he was also elected at the East Macquarie by-election held on the same day and his election to Tumut was subsequently declared void by the Elections and Qualifications Committee. He took his seat as the member for East Macquarie and doesn't appear in the records kept by the Legislative assembly as a member for Tumut.)	None	1860
Charles Cowper, Jr.	None	1860–1863
James Martin	None	1863–1864
Charles Cowper, Jr.	None	1864–1866
Edward Brown	None	1866–1872
James Hoskins	None	1872–1882
Thomas O'Mara	None	1882–1885
Travers Jones	None	1885–1887
Travers Jones	Protectionist	1887–1891
Edward Brown	Free Trade	1891–1894
Travers Jones	Protectionist	1894–1898
Robert Donaldson	Independent	1898–1901
Robert Donaldson	Progressive	1901–1904

== Election results ==
1901 New South Wales state election: Tumut
Party	Candidate	Votes	%	±%
Progressive	Robert Donaldson	1,127	57.3	+23.6
Labour	James Elphick	740	37.6	+5.6
Liberal Reform	Charles Royle	100	5.1	
Total formal votes		1,967	99.4	+2.5
Informal votes		11	0.6	−2.5
Turnout		1,978	73.8	+1.4
Member changed to Progressive from Independent				
