= Southern Morning Herald =

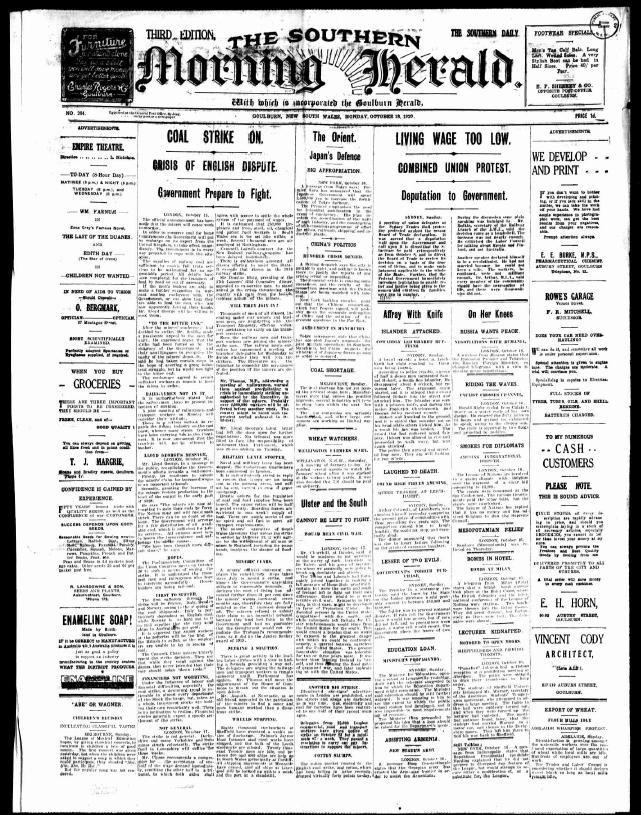
The Southern Morning Herald front page, Monday 18 October 1920

The Southern Morning Herald was an English language newspaper published in Goulburn, New South Wales. It was first published in 1868 before the federation of Australia and later absorbed the Goulburn Herald, a contemporary competitor for many years.

== History ==
The newspaper was first published in 1868 by Frank Hartley and was later absorbed into the Goulburn Evening Penny Post.

== Digitisation ==
The paper has been digitised as part of the Australian Newspapers Digitisation Program project of the National Library of Australia in cooperation with the State Library of New South Wales.

== See also ==
- List of newspapers in Australia
