= The People's Advocate and New South Wales Vindicator =

Newspaper published between 1848 and 1856 in Sydney, New South Wales, Australia

The People's Advocate and New South Wales Vindicator was a Sydney newspaper published between 1848 and 1856.

== History ==
The People's Advocate and New South Wales Vindicator was a newspaper that advocated on issues of importance for the working classes of New South Wales. It played a prominent part of the political scene in Sydney from 1848 until 1856. The appearance of the People’s Advocate in 1848 marked a distinct change in the nature, language and attitude of Australian radical print. It was the first colonial paper to demand that the workers, as producers of all wealth, receive a fairer share of labour's produce, which its banner quote from Alphonse de Lamartine proclaimed every week: "Political economy has hitherto occupied itself about the production of wealth. It must now occupy itself about the distribution of wealth; so that the labourer may no longer be left without his fair share of the produce."

The People's Advocate was established by Edward John Hawksley and the Sydney printer Francis Cunninghame. Cunninghame had previously been the editor of the Sydney Citizen but Hawksley, an English Catholic radical, wrote the majority of the paper's editorial content.

The first issue was published in December 1848. One month earlier, Edward Hawksley, in collaboration with Henry Parkes, Richard Hipkiss, J K Heydon, Francis Cunninghame, Angus Mackay, Benjamin Sutherland and other radicals, formed the Constitutional Association to press for democratic government. David Kemp in his book, Land of Dreams: How Australia Won Its Freedom, notes that the group initially formed to promote Robert Lowe as a "people's candidate" in the Legislative Council elections of that year. Inspired by Chartist ideas, The People's Advocate became the unofficial mouthpiece for the Constitutional Association.

It supported radical voices like Daniel Deniehy, Charles Harpur, Adelaide Ironside, Robert Lowe and John Dunmore Lang. It also acted as a foil to the squatting and mercantile focus of The Sydney Morning Herald. Terry Irving called The People's Advocate "the most famous radical paper of the period". In the tumultuous period between the unrest of 1848 and the establishment of New South Wales' representative government in 1856, it was E.J. Hawksley and The People's Advocate, more than any other paper, that pushed the case for democratic reforms. Don Baker writes that Lang understood the weight that The People's Advocate's reputation carried among the radical constituency. So despite his anti-Catholic rhetoric, it was within its pages that Lang looked to rehabilitate his reputation and to advance his case for election to the NSW Legislative Council. According to Baker, "Hawksley was so completely taken in that his careful, judicious leading article acquitted Lang of all charges against him."

They published at least one literary work under the imprint Hawksley and Cunninghame: Raymond, Lord of Milan, a Tragedy of the 13th Century by Edward Reeve (1851), a play in verse, which was well received by several critics. The play was staged nearly a century later by May Hollinworth at Sydney's Metropolitan Theatre.

The partnership was dissolved in January 1852, although Cunninghame continued to publish the paper from his printery in King Street.

== Hawksley and Cunninghame ==
Edward John Hawksley (1807 – 2 July 1875) was a Unitarian who converted to Catholicism, and fought with the British Legion in the Spanish Carlist Wars. After his arrival in Sydney he was employed as a teacher, became warden of the Sydney Holy Catholic Guild (1848), and wrote religious pamphlets. He edited and published the Sydney Chronicle (1846–1847) and the short-lived Daily News with Charles St Julian before working with Francis Cunninghame on the People's Advocate. From 1863 to 1870 Hawkesley was employed at the Government Printing Office, before retiring to Fiji where he died in 1875. Hawksley's daughter, Eliza, married the widowed St Julian and settled in Fiji too.

Francis Cunninghame (c. 1813 – 14 May 1884) was an Irish printer who emigrated to the colony with his wife, Ellen, and daughter, arriving on the Arkwright on 8 February 1840. His first work was to print the Sydney Morning Herald. Not long after arriving in Sydney, the family settled into rented accommodation at 60 Susannah Place, The Rocks, where their next child, another daughter Ellen, was born in 1844. The family's home has been preserved and now forms part of the Museum of The Rocks, with the living room and bedroom of the dwelling decorated in the style typical of the 1840s.

Before starting The People's Advocate, Francis Cunninghame acted as the shipping reporter at The Australasian Chronicle between 1842 and 1848. In 1847 Cunninghame worked with William Vernon and William Kennedy to publish the radical paper The Citizen, which had begun operation the previous year. With the start of the NSW gold rush, Cunninghame left for the Turong Goldfields. In 1851, in both August and September the Advocate published letters from him on life in the goldfields. After the partnership with Hawksley ended, Cunninghame continued as printer, taking over the premises of Thomas Trood at 113 King Street, Sydney. In 1869 the business became known as Francis Cunnninghame & Co when Ludolf Theodore Mellin joined the firm. Mellin had previously established The Illustrated Sydney News in 1853 with Walter George Mason (1820–1866) and William Edward Vernon. Later in 1855, Ludolf Mellin partnered with William Vernon to establish The Goulburn Chronicle and Southern Advertiser.

== See also ==
- List of newspapers in Australia
