= Hillview, Sutton Forest =

Hillview
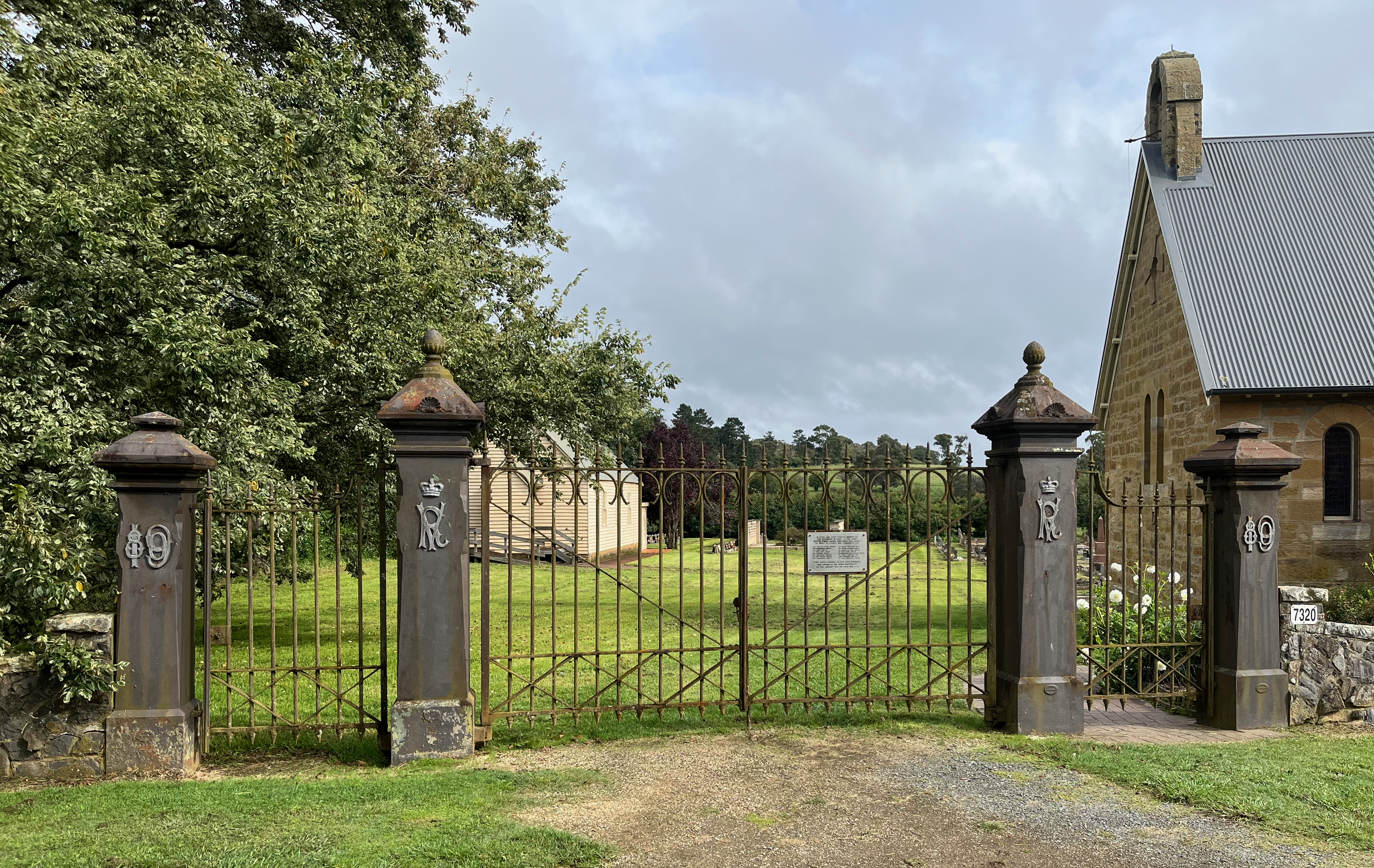
- Hillview gates, installed at All Saints', Sutton Forest in 1959

- Location within New South Wales Location within Australia
- 34.5688°S 150.3300°E
- Location: Old Illawarra Highway, Sutton Forest, New South Wales, Australia

History
- Built: 1872–1899

Site notes
- Owner: Office of Environment and Heritage

New South Wales Heritage Register
- Official name: Hillview; Prospect; Hill View
- Type: state heritage (landscape)
- Designated: 2 April 1999
- Reference no.: 442
- Type: Historic Landscape
- Category: Landscape - Cultural

Hillview is a heritage-listed former residence on the Old Illawarra Highway at Sutton Forest in the Southern Highlands region of New South Wales, Australia. It was the official country residence of the Governor of New South Wales from 1882 to 1957. The house had formerly been known as Prospect. It was added to the New South Wales State Heritage Register on 2 April 1999.

The King's Foundation in Australia launched in October 2024 with a vision to preserve heritage and promote sustainable communities. Their first major initiative is the restoration of the Hillview Estate. This historic property will be transformed into a cultural and educational hub inspired by the successful regeneration of Dumfries House in Scotland.

== History ==
=== Land grants and Richardson ownership ===
In 1819 Governor Macquarie commissioned Charles Throsby to build the first road (Old South Road - now the Illawarra Highway) through the Southern Highlands district and land grants were made to encourage settlement. Early settlers included Benjamin Crew, Charles Wright and John Larkin (or Larkham) who each received 60 acres in 1822. Their grants of neighbouring lands at Sutton Forest were later to become the property of the Queen and the site of the Governor of New South Wales' country residence.

The residence "Hillview" is situated on land granted in two portions of 60 acres by Governor Brisbane on 9 July 1822. These were portions 47 and 48 in the County of Argyle, District of Sutton, granted to Benjamin Crews, Charles Wright and John Larkham respectively.

These properties were eventually owned by Richard Pemberton Richardson. He purchased portion 47 in 1866 but sold it back to the vendor, John Morrice, two years later. On 8 February 1872 Morrice resold a share of the property to Richardson who then gained sole rights to the land in 1875 after Morrice died. Richardson's wife purchased part of portion 48 in 1872, he was a trustee. On 17 December 1878 Richardson purchased the rest of portion 48.

Richardson had come to NSW in 1850 from Liverpool in England, where his father had trained him to be a wool merchant. He joined Mort & Co., the prominent firm of auctioneers and wool brokers in Sydney, where he soon became a valued employee and was promoted in 1855 to land manager. His work brought him to the Sutton Forest district where he met and married Violet Alston of "Woodside", from a prosperous Moss Vale family. They lived in Sydney. At the end of 1857 he resigned from Mort & Co. and set up his own firm, soon building quite a reputation both for his integrity and the sound and efficient manner in which he handled his clients' affairs. In 1860 he took Edward Wrench as a partner. The firm began to specialise in stock and station sales with the emphasis on country estates. In 1866 Richardson acquired Crew's 60 acres and later bought Wright's and Larkham's acres. He called the property "Prospect" and built a house on portion 47, previously Crews'.

It was named after his first residence in Australia, "Prospect Cottage" at Newtown. "Prospect" makes up part of the main house of "Hillview". The date of construction is most likely to date from somewhere between 1872 and 1875. It was a two-storey stone house with detached stables, built from stone quarried on the property. It consisted of three main rooms, three bedrooms, a hallway and rear attached kitchen where the stairs were located. The stairs led to a separate room upstairs. Richardson added a number of extensions in stone and timber prior to the sale to the Crown in 1882.

The garden was not developed until the house was erected (1872–75). So well did Richardson prosper that he retired from his firm in 1875 and took up residence at Prospect. By then the district had become a tourist destination because the Great Southern Railway from 1867 brought visitors attracted by the healthy climate of the highlands. Moss Vale grew into a busy town around its railway station (first called Sutton Forest North).

However, Richardson soon found retirement at Prospect unsatisfying and decided to return to Richardson & Wrench. Richardson sold Prospect (143 acres) to the Government of New South Wales in 1881, returned to active business undertakings and built himself another country residence.

=== Official country residence ===
From the earliest days of the colony, the governors had felt the need for a residence outside Sydney to which they could move for a change of air and relief from summer heat. Port Hacking was considered, being a seaside locale, but was a tedious trip by coach involving two river crossings.

There had been pressure from a number of New South Wales governors to purchase a country property for their use. Government House at Parramatta was used as an alternative country residence until Governor Fitzroy (1846–55). The Earl of Belmore (1868-72) and Sir Hercules Robinson (1872–79) leased residences in the Southern Highlands while in office.

The Earl of Belmore was quick to realise the advantage that the just-opened railway line to Moss Vale provided in terms of access to the Southern Highlands area. Robinson often stayed privately in the highlands.

When Lord Augustus Loftus was appointed in 1879 he immediately requested an alternative summer residence as he suffered from the salt air. Unable to find a suitable residence he suggested Government House at Parramatta. Loftus continued the pressure to purchase a residence but did not have the personal means to purchase a country house. This pressure was heightened in July 1881 when he was forced to extend his hospitality at Government House in Sydney to Prince Albert and Prince George who were visiting with the Royal Navy. The illness of Rear-Admiral Lord Clanwilliam for three weeks extended the visit of the fleet and the princes continued their stay at Government House at additional cost to Lord Loftus. This proved to be a considerable financial strain for him and he wrote to Lord Kimberley in the Gladstone administration requesting action on the matter.

As a result of this and previous agitation, the government purchased "Prospect" at Sutton Forest on 1 February 1882 out of a £100,000 Treasurer's advance account for expenses of an unforeseen nature. The approval of the state parliament for the expenditure was not sought at the time. However, the government changed and vigorous debate took place in March 1883 in which it was claimed that the purchase was unconstitutional and illegal.

Meanwhile, government architect James Barnet was instructed in 1882 to propose plans for substantial additions to the house. In April that year the Under Secretary for Public Works gave his consent for the work to be carried out. This was to take place before October to allow for occupation during the summer season. Tenders were called and results reported on 23 May 1882.

The tenders made were high and a recall was made. The prices were still high and Barnet recommended declining all tenders, demolishing the building and designing a new residence. Several schemes were proposed but do not seem to have taken place. Public Works reports for the years 1881-1883 show no expenditure on "Hillview", the records for 1884-1887 do not itemise expenditure and in 1888 and 1889 show just over 411 pounds spent on repairs and furniture. However, during 1884 the government acquired two land lots located next to "Hillview" from the Church of England. Negotiations for the purchase had begun when the government purchased "Hillview" but had been held up due to some problems, including the extent of land to be purchased.

The house was extensively remodelled, with the staircases and other woodwork being done by William Barnsley of Sutton Forest. When completed in 1883 it had 46 rooms, including 9 bathrooms and over 3 acres of landscaped gardens with many trees and shrubs having been planted. The alterations cost the government 10,000 pounds - a mighty sum in those days, which caused furious debate in the New South Wales Legislative Assembly.

Loftus probably first took up residence at 'Hillview in June 1884 or the following summer.

The major period of extensions to the house appears to have been from 1890-1899.

Further minor additions and alterations were carried out between 1900 and 1957.

=== Hillview's garden; and its impact on the district ===
A huge boost had come to the district when the NSW Governor, the Earl of Belmore decided in 1865 to lease Throsby Park, Moss Vale, as a summer residence, which he did until 1872.

From 1870 onwards the tourist trade (in the Southern Highlands) grew, and by 1890 it was said that Bowral "held its own as a fashionable resort". The picturesque scenery aligned itself more with the idea of the English countryside than did the invigorative and sublime scenery of the Blue Mountains, which were not so "gentrified".

By the mid-1880s the old elitism of the gentrified squattocracy was replaced by the ostentatious extravagance of those previously unaccustomed to wealth. Evidence of prosperity was never more important than in the High Victorian era of the 1880s. Wealthy landowners sought to outdo one another by including every possible urn, fountain or folly, so that by the end of the 1870s garden layouts were starting to display signs of the eclectic fashion of High Victorian taste, made possible by the horticultural and literary boom. The Treseder Brothers of Ashfield, Sydney and W. Adamson in Melbourne, however, continued the work of Thomas Shepherd and appealed for simplicity: "It is the common fault in designing of gardens to attempt too much, to introduce too many flower beds and walks and ornaments, to plant too largely and of kinds attaining too great a size - simplicity of garden design should always be kept in view, and it should be combined with a sufficient amount of intricacy to avoid plainness".

Hillview possessed the simple qualities espoused by the Treseders and Mr Adamson. Picturesque simplicity was associated with the English gentry; the Governor, whose country residence it was, was not compelled to display a lavish and pretentious garden, for his social standing was well recognised.

In 1882 "The Illustrated Sydney News" described it as "on the summit of a hill, which overlooks the village, and hidden from sight by a clump of splendid pines, stands the summer residence of the Governor of NSW, commanding a splendid view to the north. It is no doubt greatly owing to this that Sutton Forest is alive and vigorous". The same article went on to say that the landscape "possesses no picturesque ravines nor thundery waterfalls to make it popular with the tourist."

The grounds were already "beautifully laid out" (1882) when Charles Moore superintended additional planting in keeping with their vice-regal status. Moore provided assistance in designing the garden, which had a simple and uncluttered layout. The main elements were a long serpentine driveway, rose garden and parkland opening out to magnificent views. Moore is likely to have designed the pine avenue lining the driveway which was planted by the Earl of Jersey in the 1890s, in order to harmonise with the predominantly Monterey pine (Pinus radiata) shelter that was well established on the western side of the garden. Previous to this the carriage way was treeless, defined only by a white post and rail fence shown in an etching in an 1882 edition of the Illustrated Sydney News.

The major period of extensions to the house appears to have been from 1890-1899.

Joseph Henry Maiden took over Charles Moore's position as Director of the Sydney Botanic Gardens in 1896, after Moore's long term of 48 years. Maiden was not only responsible for the 40 acres of gardens in Sydney but also for the 763 acres of Centennial Park, 300 acres of the Governor's residence, Hillview at Sutton Forest, the State Nursery at Cambpelltown and sundry other establishments.

After Queen Victoria died in 1901 there was a change in fashion and the pines were removed in favour of elms (Ulmus procera, "English" elm). At this time the gate house stood at the western side of the entrance, which was marked by iron gates displaying the Royal cipher. The gate house was removed by Lord Wakehurst in 1938.

=== Government sale and Klein ownership ===
The Government decided to sell "Hillview" after the governorship of General Northcott in 1957. This decision has been attributed to the high cost of maintenance and the brief periods of occupancy. The property went to auction and was purchased by Edwin Klein in April 1958. Klein was born near Parkes NSW in 1901 and brought up on a small farm. He had made his money as a builder and land developer around Shellharbour on the NSW South Coast. He paid the £35,000 asking price for Hillview in 1958 with the intention of "creating a peaceful retreat for retired senior citizens".

Klein and his partner Walter Winley opened the "Emma Louise Hostel", Hillview in September 1958. However this project failed and the main house was for a time unoccupied, Klein living in an outbuilding that had been the quarters of the governor's aide-de-camp. Klein had reportedly not intended to live at "Hillview", but was so taken with its charm and uniqueness that he decided to use it as his residence. He set about improving the property, including landscaping, some painting and providing lookouts. Little was done to the fabric of the house or outbuildings.

Klein never lived in the main house, preferring the small aide's wing. He was a well-read and largely self taught scholar and philosopher who thought that man's greatest assets were knowledge and wisdom but that intellectual/spiritual development of mankind had not kept pace with the scientific or technological advancement resulting in human discord. He longer for improved human relations on an international scale. It is believed that his obsession with these ideas and concept of "cultural minds wisely balanced in thought and action" was the principal reason for his creative endeavours in the garden at Hillview. He wanted to develop "a garden of the mind for beauty, performance and perception".

In instigating these ideas, Klein set about "improving" the garden. He decided the grounds should be completely re-landscaped. All the unsightly fences were removed with a single skin of flat stones standing on their edges. He hardly altered the existing vice-regal garden, although he did remove 160 trees and shrubs which he considered to be insignificant, including a beautiful cypress hedge on the north-west side of the house. He furiously underplanted all that remained with camellias, azaleas, rhododendrons and oleanders and set out to create his "show garden" with rose beds and huge displays of dahlias - 500 varieties in every conceivable colour, shape and size 'new types being raised from the gardener's own seed'. In c. 1958, he extended the garden from 3.5 to 7 acres to allow for his dream, "a place for contemplation and the getting of wisdom". The design and imagery used in the garden is based on this philosophy, to create spaces and symbols for shelter, repose and to nourish the mind, epitomised by his building of the circular "Treasury of Wisdom" and "The Haven". Other structures include 2 stone archways on the entrance drive, observation/viewing platforms, contemplative pool and fish pond, brick and timber pergolas, concrete urns, low brick and stone walls, rockeries, steps and terraces all linked by concrete paths with a crazy paving motif. A number of small garden sculptures including a sculpture of Pan and various urns and ornaments providing an element of contemplation.

He tilled the 7 acres of garden almost entirely by himself, moving the soil, mulch, plants and implements in the boot of his car. He often worked through the night by lamplight, and it was said that the neighbours always knew which part of the garden was being worked by following the movement of the lamp. Klein did not believe in watering a garden: "survival of the fittest" he said. The present water supply is joined to the local town system but the pipes around the garden are 1940s vintage and water pressure generally low. The system has a restricted life span and taps do not reach all areas of the garden. The existing stonework and embellishments emanate from the Klein era, which ended when Klein gifted Hillview back to the state government (1985).

=== Modern government ownership ===
In 1985 Klein gifted "Hillview" to the NSW Government on condition that he was given tenancy for the term of his life and that if the government wished to dispose of the property prior to 2005, ownership would revert to his family. The resident caretaker, Vic Tatt and his wife Helen who went to Hillview in 1987 and cared for Klein in his last 3 years stayed on and cared for the property. They lived in the cottage, originally the stableman's quarters, 1898, behind the homestead.

In the 1990s Damien Miller became intrigued with Hillview when attending an open garden day. The house was in a dilapidated state, although essential work on the roof and to meet fire safety requirements had been done and a conservation plan had been prepared. In 1999 he responded to a government advertisement calling for expressions of interest in conserving and adapting Hillview. If he undertook certain works within a certain time frame he would be rewarded with a lease. Although initially estimating the restoration would take two years it stretched on until 2005.

By the mid 1990s the garden was showing neglect. All of Klein's garden sculptures were characterised by a very economical use of materials, some of his timber pergolas were constructed from recycled fence posts, the brick structures were single brick-on-edge technique and the stone buildings and walls were a single skin of flat stones standing on their edges fixed together with a minimal use of cement. The condition of structures was very poor and they required reinforcement or removal.

Restoration of the garden included clearing of overgrown areas, moving of underplantings to more suitable areas, improving and mulching soil and replanting appropriate to specific areas i.e. the Vice-Regal area and Klein's area. The Southern Highlands Branch of the Australian Garden History Society decided in 1993 to make the conservation of Hillview's garden their main project, working with the Department of Planning. All trees, shrubs and plants were recorded and assessed and restoration of the garden included clearing of overgrown areas, moving of underplantings to more suitable areas, improving and mulching soil and replanting appropriate to specific areas i.e. the Vice-Regal area and Klein's area. Twice yearly open days were arranged when the Society opened the garden to the public in April and October. Boundary fencing was completed so the property could again be a working farm and stock kept out of the garden. A major hawthorn and Scottish broom infestation was removed from the paddocks and work undertaken restoring the garden. Many of Klein's structures were deteriorated: they were archivally recorded and demolished. It was agreed that Klein's 26 years of ownership and garden philosophy should be recognised and therefore the eastern side of the garden is to be retained as he built and planted it. Restoration works included strengthening of the viewing platforms, retaining Klein's contemplation pool, seats, pergola etc. Klein's plantings in this area were pruned, cleared and tidied up, paths and steps made safe. The rest of the garden was restored as it was in its Vice-Regal days.

In 1997 the Southern Highlands Branch got a $7500 grant for tree care work at Hillview: tree surgery, and the establishment of a guided tree walk with permanent labels for significant trees, creating a level path through the collection, establishing new collections of trees to extend the arboretum and install tree guards for paddock trees. The Branch's working bees and open days at Hillview ceased c. 2003. A plaque mounted on a stone near the driveway "turn" to the house records this involvement.

Miller finally completed the restoration of Hillview in 2005, having taken four years longer than anticipated. He subsequently wound up in a legal dispute with the Heritage Council over whether he could obtain a lease, the Heritage Council having twice ordered him to stop work during renovations over various issues. He initiated a case in the Supreme Court of New South Wales in 2007, which was eventually resolved in 2011, at which time he signed a 40-year lease of Hillview.

The four-roomed Aide-de-Camp (ADC) Quarters was severely damaged by a fallen oak tree in storms early in 2010. The tree has mostly been removed and the building secured and repaired. Miller opened Hillview as a boutique hotel in late 2011. In 2023 the long-term government leasehold was again put on the market for the first time in 24 years. The following year the leasehold was purchased by the King's Foundation Australia.

== Description ==
The residence "Hillview" is located towards the southern portion of its site at the highest point of the 60.4-hectare (149-acre) rural property.

=== Homestead complex ===
Hillview is a late Victorian complex of buildings constructed predominantly of timber and corrugated iron with elements of brick and stone. The existing buildings reflect a variety of styles and design that do not present a consistent appearance. The buildings are fragmented, highly articulated, varied in roof pitch, cladding materials, proportions and details.

The buildings reflect their form in 1899 after completion of a period of vice-regal additions and changes.

There are 38 habitable rooms in the main two storey house and associated staff wings, including 27 bedrooms, and a further 14 ancillary rooms - toilets, bathrooms, laundries and storage. The total floor area is in the order of 940 metres square. A caretaker's house with six rooms is situated south of the main house, with garages and stables completing the complex.

The incremental construction of the main house, built around a smaller brick and stone L-shaped building, has resulted in a structure with a maze of corridors linking rooms and staircases.

The buildings retain the Vice-regal form of 1899 with minor adaptations.

=== Gardens ===
An English elm (Ulmus procera) and Lombardy poplar (Populus nigra 'Italica') tree-lined carriageway follows a drainage depression climbing the hill east and north of and reaching up to the main house through informal parkland before circling behind (west and south of) the house and gardens. The driveway terminates south of the house, adjacent to outbuildings forming a rear courtyard.

A paddock almost encircled by the climbing drive (on its east and south) is planted with Himalayan cedars (Cedrus deodara) and elms.

On the upper drive's slope is a large mature evergreen oak (Quercus sp.) tree (see discussion below). A Camellia japonica cv. (double hot pink) shrub flanks the drive.

The flower garden and shrubbery were sited toward the western side of the house, acting as a transition from the screened service area. The only other plantings were the foundation plantings around the house. A series of intact walkways divided the beds, which were edged with terracotta tiles. The parkland wraps around the garden opening out to a series of vistas.

A second gate indicates the formal house entry as distinct from the servants' entry and the carriage loop sweeps around to the front of the house. The central ground consisted of an island of grass with a bed of roses. Beyond the carriage loop is an expanse of gently sloping lawn with a rose garden that radiates in a fan from a circular bed. An existing bull bay/evergreen magnolia (Magnolia grandiflora) is one of the few remaining specimen trees from the early planting.

The boundaries and curtilage remain in their 1872 form, with cycles of embellishment and neglect reflecting the changing tides of governmental attitude to spending and to the role of the governors. Moore's layout of 1872 is still legible today, not least from its rich plant collection, particularly in tree species, featuring conifers, oak species and some New Zealand plants popular between the 1890s and 1930s. The driveway and pines from the 1890s were replaced with English elms (Ulmus procera) and Lombardy poplars (Populus nigra 'Italica') between 1934 and the 1950s.

New Zealand plants include lemonwood/tarata (Pittosporum eugenioides), flax/harakeke (Phormium tenax) and green and purple forms of cabbage tree/ti kouka (Cordyline australis). Chinese plants are another theme, including Kerria japonica, beauty bush (Kolkwitzia amabilis), honeysuckles (Lonicera spp.), cherry plums (Prunus cerasifera cv.s) and flowering cherries (Prunus serrulata cv.s). The garden makes good use of surrounding views and borrowed landscape and garners shelter with thick planting.

The shrubbery contains other camellia cultivars (formal double pink; and "Roma Risorto" a white double, spotted finely with crimson), Japanese wisteria (Wisteria floribunda), Monterey pines, cypresses and an array of old-fashioned shrubs.

The gardens have been replanned, replanted and extended by Klein and dedicated to the memory of his mother. The property boundaries have remained the same from the early 1870s.

=== Modifications and dates ===
- 1872-5: original "Prospect" house developed along with garden
- c. 1875-1882:
  - Timber sitting room with attached store room added
  - Timber Chapel added
  - Stone single storey extension to kitchen
  - Timber addition to chapel and store room
  - Charles Moore supervised laying out of grounds and garden: its main elements were a long serpentine driveway, rose garden and parkland opening out to magnificent views. The carriage way was (in 1882) treeless, defined only by a white post and rail fence
- 1884-1885: additions
  - Dining room
  - Possibly 3 rooms of the A.D.C. wing
  - Possibly the housekeeper's building
  - Possibly the male servants building
  - Probably the main stairwell, main hall as far as the morning room and store room adjacent to the morning room
  - The detached toilet behind rooms 19 and 23
  - Gatehouse opposite the parsonage
  - A verandah railing and posts on the A.D.C. Wing
  - A return verandah to the first dining room
  - Removal of existing staircase
- 1890s: gates and pines along driveway added - Moore is likely to have designed the pine avenue lining the driveway planted by the Earl of Jersey in the 1890s, in order to harmonise with the predominantly (Monterey) pine (Pinus radiata) shelter that was well established on the western side of the garden.
- 1893:
  - workshops
  - Ladies-in-Waiting wing
  - 2 additional bedrooms to Ladies-in-Waiting wing
  - Scullery adjacent to kitchen
  - Bathroom and laundry behind female servants wing
- 1894:
  - Dining room and verandah
  - Garage adjacent to stone stables
- 1896:
  - Sitting room extension
  - Caretaker's accommodation and verandah
  - Bathrooms adjacent to dining room
  - Entrance to A.D.C. bathroom
  - Garage behind stable
- 1898: Bathroom to Ladies-in-Waiting wing
- 1901: the driveway's avenue of pines were removed in favour of "English" elms (Ulmus procera). At this time the gate house stood at the western side of the entrance, which was marked by iron gates displaying the Royal cipher.
- 1902:
  - Stablemans quarters
  - Addition to garage
  - Fruit room
- 1899-1924:
  - Conversion of bedrooms to day use rooms
  - Conversion of Morning room and store room
- 1924-1934:
  - Conversion of more rooms to other uses
  - Septic system added (1934)
- 1934-1957:
  - Further rooms converted to other uses
  - Kitchen gardens added to the north
  - Gatehouse demolished (c. 1938) and the entrance road reformed
  - Driveway pines replaced by elms
  - Main ground floor rooms redecorated by Lord Wakehurst.
- 1962 - Gardens extended
- 1970 - Top of water tower rebuilt with viewing platforms
- 1957 - 1985:
  - Some sections of house painted an off-white colour
  - Scullery fitted out as coffee bar
- 1958+: size of garden was doubled and completely re-landscaped
- 1994-2003: garden restoration by the Southern Highlands branch of the Australian Garden History Society

=== Governors associated with Hillview and dates of assuming office ===
- 4/8/1889 - Lord Augustus William Frederick Spencer Loftus, PC, GCB.
- 12/12/1885 - Baron Carrington PC, GCMG.
- 15/1/1891 - Earl of Jersey PC, GCMG.
- 29/5/1893 - Sir Robert William Duff, PC, GCMG.
- 22/11/1895 - Viscount Hampden GCMG.
- 18/5/1899 - Earl Beauchamp KCMG.
- 27/5/1902 - Admiral Sir Harry Holdsworth Rawson, GCB.
- 28/5/1909 - Baron Chelmsford, GCMG.
- 14/3/1913 - Sir Gerald Strickland, GCMG.
- 18/2/1918 - Sir Walter Edward Davidson, KCMG..
- 28/2/1924 - Admirl Sir Dudley Rawson Stratford De Chair, KCB, MVO.
- 29/5/1930 - Air Vice Marshall Sir Philip Woolcott Game, CBE, KCB, DSO.
- 21/2/1935 - Sir Alexander Hore-Ruthven, VC, KCMG, CB, DSO afterwards Lord Gowrie, VC, GCMG, CB, DSO.
- 6/8/1936 - Admiral Sir David Murray Anderson, KCB, KCMG, MVO.
- 8/4/1937 - Baron Wakehurst, KCMG.
- 1/8/1946 - General Sir John Northcott, KCMG, KCVO, CB, K St.J.

== Heritage listing ==
Hillview has exceptional significance to the people of New South Wales as the former country home of the governors of New South Wales. The house and its assemblage are a rare surviving collection that not only relates to its gubernatorial occupation but also demonstrates ways of life, taste and decoration from the 1880s to the 1950s. It is the most intact government summer residence to survive and provides insights into the lives and lifestyles of the governors not seen at Government House, Sydney.

Hillview was the Vice Regal country residence for Governors of NSW between 1882 and 1957. Sixteen Governors used it over a period of 75 years. It reflects government policies, attitudes and budgetary considerations from 1882 to 1957. The site retains its curtilage from the early 1870s and the buildings are in the form known in 1899 following the completion of the Vice Regal additions with only minor alterations since. The Vice Regal contents are largely intact and clearly indicate the way the buildings were occupied and used.

Hillview, including the site, buildings, gardens, archaeological features, fittings and contents has exceptional significance to the people of NSW as the former country home of the Governors of NSW.

The house and its assemblage are a rare surviving collection that not only relate to its gubernatorial occupation but demonstrate ways of life, taste and decoration from the 1880s period through to the 1950s period. Their value is enhanced as the place has been largely untouched since 1957 following the departure of the last Governor prior to the sale of the property.

Hillview has been associated with a range of significant people in the history of NSW including Governors, architects and landscapers, as well as numerous visitors during the occupation of the Governors. Hillview is of significance in its relationship to Government House Sydney and other Government houses and country retreats throughout Australia. It is the most intact Government summer residence to survive and provides insights into the lives and lifestyles of the Governors that is not seen at Government House Sydney. Hillview through the buildings, furnishings, gardens and archaeological potential has the ability to reveal new information about the broader history and development of NSW due to the intact form of most parts of the assemblage from its Government occupation.

Hillview was listed on the New South Wales State Heritage Register on 2 April 1999 having satisfied the following criteria:

The place is important in demonstrating the course, or pattern, of cultural or natural history in New South Wales.

The place has been the country or summer home of the Governors from 1882 to 1957. It is the second country home of the Governors preceded only by Old Government House at Parramatta. It has had a continuity of use that has demonstrated a pattern of life esteemed in the community and has been an integral part of the Government of the state and the cultural life of the Governors and their families. It is the only Governor's country residence to survive intact in Australia.

The place demonstrates the development of the state and nation, the role of Governors and broader patterns of settlement within the Southern Highlands area.

The place has a strong or special association with a person, or group of persons, of importance of cultural or natural history of New South Wales's history.

The place has most obviously been the country home of the Governors for 75 years. As a group they are of high significance of the cultural and political development of the history of NSW. The house demonstrates their patterns of occupancy and use, as do surviving contents and furnishings.

Individual Governors are also of significance to the place through their role in either the purchase (Loftus), making a significance impact (Wakehurst) or in the sale of the property (Northcott). Hillview has historical significance, through several of the Governors as significant events related to the Government of the State took place there.

The place is significant for its association with a number of other prominent figures in NSW including Charles Moore, attributed with the garden layout, Professor Waterhouse, attributed with major changes to the garden and James Barnet, attributed with the design of the house.

Prior to its Government acquisition the place was owned by Richardson, who appears to have built the house. As founder of Richardson and Wrench, one of the major real estate and stock and station agents in NSW, his association with the property is strong.

The place is important in demonstrating aesthetic characteristics and/or a high degree of creative or technical achievement in New South Wales.

The house, despite its rambling form and unusual layout, is aesthetically pleasing and is set within an important extensive garden. The house demonstrates Victorian ideals in massing and siting and the ability to adapt to structures in unusual and what now appears as illogical ways.

Hillview is a landmark site within the Southern Highlands, not only for its association with the Governors but also for the buildings and the other major plantings that crown the hilltop and which are viewed from all directions in the district.

The buildings demonstrate a broad range of construction techniques, including the early use of kit buildings, that typify late Victorian construction.

The furniture contents demonstrate high levels of technical and creative achievement, particularly seen in the dining room suite by Verdich and a number of other fine pieces in the collection. The collection of furniture is also of high significance as it is a complete collection of Government furniture made for, acquired for and collected for Hillview between 1882 and 1957.

The close association of the place with Government House, Sydney, and the transfer of furniture between the properties is also of significance as it strongly relates the Hillview furniture collection to the collection at Government House making them collectively one of the major State furniture collections in NSW.

The gardens demonstrate significant aesthetic characteristics both in the Government garden and the Klein additions. The garden appears to contain significant plantings from a range of periods and provides an insight into garden and property management extending back to the occupation of the early Governors.

The property demonstrates patterns of settlement and amalgamation of early grants with the boundaries remaining unchanged since the purchase of the various lots by Richardson. This also reflects the stability of property holdings in the Sutton Forest area since settlement.

Views to and from the garden and buildings into the surrounding countryside are also of significance as they demonstrate Victorian and Edwardian ideals in landscape design and setting.

The place has strong or special association with a particular community or cultural group in New South Wales for social, cultural or spiritual reasons.

'Hillview' was the Vice Regal country residence used by sixteen successive Governors of NSW. It reflects government policies, attitudes and budgetary considerations from 1882 to 1957 in relation to the office of Governor. The buildings retain the form known in 1899 following the completion of the Vice Regal additions. The site retains its curtilage from the early 1870s and the Vice Regal contents are largely intact and clearly indicate the way the buildings were occupied and used. The fabric as a document clearly indicates the successive physical changes reflecting changes of occupant, style and taste.

This occupation makes Hillview important as a social document which has the ability to interpret the changing role of Governor from Colonial times to the Post WW2 period. It retains its Vice Regal character of the late 1950s despite its more recent ownership.

Much of the contents date from the 1880s and 1890s and were either purchased for the property or had come from Government House in Sydney. The contents are a valuable collection in their own right. The collection is unique in maintaining its associations with the Governors who used the residence.

Since Mr Klein's ownership the place has become identified with the local community through charity open days and his hospitality. The residence is a local landmark which is the focus of considerable community interest.

It is the only Governor's country residence of the period with intact contents surviving in Australia.

The place has potential to yield information that will contribute to an understanding of the cultural or natural history of New South Wales.

Hillview has potential to yield information that will contribute to an understanding of NSW's cultural history. As the former home of the governors, Hillview has potential to provide information on their way of life and the role of the Governors in NSW's political and social life. Because the house has been unaltered since its Government ownership and has remained static since 1957, it provides insight into the life of the Governors that is unique.

The understanding and insights from Hillview differ greatly from those available at Government House Sydney, or Old Government House, Parramatta. Government House provides insights into the official life of the Governors as well as some insights into their family life in the city. Old Government House, which has not been occupied by the Governors for over a century no longer contains any elements of the Governors occupation. In contrast Hillview provides insights into the leisure and family life of the Governors through the house, the grounds, the furnishings and the contents. The contents in particular provide evidence of the activities of the Governors families at Hillview.

This is enhanced by the furniture and contents collection which is a collection of items all related to the Governors use of the property and the operation of the property.

The buildings also provide clear evidence of the change and development of the place, principally between 1882 and 1899 when most of the development of the site took place, but also the smaller changes that have taken place this century. The building fabric is capable of a high level of interpretation and understanding that can provide insights into planning, construction and ways of life.

Hillview has research potential through its known and potential archaeological resource. This resource has been clearly established for the occupation of the property following white settlement and has the potential to extend to earlier aboriginal occupation of the site.

The gardens retain trees / species believed to date from 1882 as selected by Mr Charles Moore, Director of the Royal Botanic Gardens, Sydney.

The place possesses uncommon, rare or endangered aspects of the cultural or natural history of New South Wales.

It is only one of two Governors country retreats that have survived in Australia and it is the only one to retain its setting, fitout and furnishings.

The occupancy of the Governors makes Hillview a property where the lives of the Governors can be seen and understood outside the formality of Government House, Sydney.

Despite the sale of the property in 1957 to Edwin Klein and its subsequent 40 years of non-intervention, the place has retained its appearance and general fitout from the period of the Governors occupation. This allows a rare encapsulated view of the Governors and their occupation of the place.

The place is important in demonstrating the principal characteristics of a class of cultural or natural places/environments in New South Wales.

Hillview demonstrates a way of life that has been lost. The survival of the fitout from the time of eth Governors, demonstrates tastes and fashions over a period of 75 years government occupation.

Apart from its connection with the Governors, Hillview is an intact example of a country house in the Southern Highlands area that has not undergone extensive upgrading or refitting.

The place demonstrates Government policy, attitudes and budgetary considerations between 1882 and 1957. This can be seen in the haphazard nature of the alterations and additions and the apparent randomness of maintenance carried out.
