= Golden Vale, Sutton Forest =

Golden Vale
- Location within New South Wales Location within Australia
- 34.5424°S 150.3105°E
- Location: Golden Vale Road, Sutton Forest, Wingecarribee Shire, New South Wales, Australia

History
- Built: 1868–1869

Site notes
- Owner: National Trust of Australia (NSW)

New South Wales Heritage Register
- Official name: Golden Vale; Golden Valley
- Type: state heritage (landscape)
- Designated: 2 April 1999
- Reference no.: 489
- Type: Homestead Complex
- Category: Farming and Grazing

Golden Vale is a heritage-listed farm and country residence at in the Southern Highlands region of New South Wales in Australia. Located on Golden Vale Road, Sutton Forest, it was built from 1868 to 1869. It is also known as Golden Valley. The property is owned by the National Trust of Australia (NSW). It was added to the New South Wales State Heritage Register on 2 April 1999.

== History ==
Golden Vale was originally called Golden Valley by ex-convict Thomas Wilmott when he was granted the land in 1842, a short distance from the west bank of the Medway Rivulet and below the western slopes of Mount Gingenbullen. After receiving his ticket-of-leave in 1822, Wilmott amassed some wealth and was a successful innkeeper in the Berrima district. He also became owner of several properties besides Golden Valley.

It was subsequently purchased by Edward Carter, who had inherited substantial landholdings at Emu Creek from his father, Benjamin Carter in 1857. Edward Carter acquired further holdings, and by 1880 would also own the Bangadilly, Burganglo, Evandale, Joadja, Nandi, The Gap, Tugalong and Golden Vale estates. He also discovered kerosene shale in the Joadja Valley and began mining it c. 1873, selling out in 1878.

Edward Carter built the present Golden Vale homestead c. late 1860s to accommodate his wife and family. His youngest son was born there in 1870.

The Golden Valley property was known for its annual kangaroo hunt which lasted for several days. A newspaper report in 1871 described a kangaroo hunt here: "The annual hunt at Nandi came of fon tuesday, wednesday and thursday last with the greatest success...Edward Carter Esq. of Golden Vale, Sutton, on whose estate this established annual meeting takes place. Thirty-two huntsmen, forty four dogs and forty-eight horses comprised the equipment and the grand total killed in the two and a half days was 76 kangaroos and 15 joeys".

The Carter family had become important leaders in the district by the time Golden Valley homestead was built. In 1879 Alfred, Edward's eldest son, left Golden Vale and moved to the property Lake Edward at Crookwell. Edward and his sons ran sheep and cattle and bred some very fine horses at the Crookwell and Sutton Forest properties over the following years.

By 1898 Alfred had married and managed all the family properties. Edward Carter died in 1903 and was buried at All Saints Church in Sutton Forest. He had seen his family fortune increase over the years and was able to leave each son a sizeable holding.

In 1904 Alfred returned to live at Golden Valley with his wife and small son, Walter. Alfred died in 1922 and Walter left Golden Vale five years later to return to his original home at Crookwell. In 1939 Golden Valley was sold to Sir Phillip Goldfinch who retained the property until his death in 1943.

In 1943 Frank Keighley, of "Myddelton" (Mt.Eymard) in Bowral, purchased Golden Valley from the executors of the Goldfinch estate. This property remained in the Keighley family until 2004. Geoffrey Keighley, international cricketer and later member of the Parliament of New South Wales, bought 400 acres of the farm from his uncle, which he added to, before inheriting the remainder of the land on the uncle's death. Keighley restored the house and filled it with an extensive library.

Following an earthquake in 1961, the building underwent repairs and the chimneys were replaced with concrete covers. The kitchen and wet areas were modernised during the twentieth century, with various details also changed (e.g. the loss of shutters).

In 1984, Geoffrey Keighley requested that the Heritage Council place a heritage order over the property. Keighley was opposing the establishment of a hard rock mine on nearby Mount Gingenbullen, to Golden Vale's immediate north, at the time of his request. One concern was the potential for the impact of blasting to crack the sandstone of Golden Vale's buildings.

The house, kitchen block and laundry/dairy block were restored in 1984 or 1985. The Italian loggia, swimming pool and conservatory were added at this time. The sandstone courtyard was enclosed as a three-sided courtyard by the construction of a sandstone garage on former open space at the rear of the house. The verandah was rebuilt and enclosed along the north wall, and the northern wing was connected to the main homestead by a north-facing conservatory.

In 1990 it comprised 560 hectares and was still run as a cattle enterprise with some sheep.

In 2004, Geoffrey and Karin Keighley gifted the property to the National Trust of Australia, a few months before Geoffrey's death. Karin Keighley continued to live in the property, with her and a manager looking after the day-to-day care of the property and homestead.

On 23 June 2007, the National Trust auctioned 95 of the 300 acres of Golden Vale gifted to them, with the money raised to go into an endowment fund to preserve the homestead and garden.

The property was not open to the public as of 2018.

== Description ==
The homestead group at the farm's core consists of:

- homestead - built c. late 1860s
- stone meathouse
- original, sandstone two-storey barn/stables
- weatherboard woolshed
- several machinery sheds
- a double garage
- a single garage
- carriage house

=== Homestead ===
Golden Vale is a fine two storey sandstone Georgian house facing south-east with a steep iron roof with two chimneys. The house follows the Georgian (Revival) tradition with a symmetrical disposition of its shuttered French doors on the ground floor and twelve-paned windows on the first floor. The lower storey has a substantial verandah across the front which returns half way along either side of the house, supported on timber columns. Very fine red cedar joinery throughout the house is of good quality, most of which is intact.

Internally the arrangement of rooms is not quite so formal. In two rooms corner fireplaces are used. In the front room on the right of the 7'6" (2.3m) wide hall, there is a corner fireplace with a black marble mantelpiece. Strangely, the wall on one side of the fireplace has been opened into the next space by a large flattened arch. A similar arch is used to articulate the hall. The original colour scheme and friezes were discovered by the builder but have not been followed in repainting.

Original floor boards exist in the dining room and rare cedar woodwork and doors are throughout. The building boasts an entry hall, music room, library, drawing room and dining room each of which have beautiful French windows and solid fuel fireplaces. It also features a marble fireplace, slate fireplace, cedar fireplaces, and a cedar staircase.

There are three large bedrooms on the first floor, the main bedroom having the addition of a dressing room and bathroom.

At the rear an enclosed court is formed by the kitchen wings. At the rear of the homestead, a courtyard is formed by the 24' (7.3m) long kitchen block and the wing which contains the meat room and laundry. All three buildings are in sandstone.

The sandstone kitchen block is a separate building accessed by the conservatory. The former servants' room is now the laundry/pantry/meat room block and there is an adjoining meat room.

The additions are generally reasonably sympathetic in manner and have been undertaken in order to make the house comfortable as a 'gentleman's residence'. The single storey verandah across the front and two sides has been continued along the rear (north) wall to give shelter to the kitchen courtyard, and on the east side, the verandah has been extended and enclosed to provide a breakfast room and sheltered access to the kitchen wing. The interior of the kitchen wing has been extensively refurbished and a new double garage has been built on the north side of the courtyard in a style and materials mimicking the laundry/meathouse next to it.

Other homestead group elements include:

- stone footings to the southwest of the stone woolshed (possibly from earlier, 1856 house?), and
- a driveway passing to the rear (western side) of the house. (The site gives no indication that the house has ever been accessible from the front; there seems to be no other alignment for the drive than the present one which passes the rear of the house and ends at the stone footings near the woolshed to the house's north);
- an inner protected courtyard formed by the homestead and the meathouse extended by the addition of new rendered
- walls creating an enclosed walled garden at the side of the house with a newly planted garden within.;
- a couple of weatherboard cottages;
- a stone stables/coach house with a more modern weatherboard shearing shed attached on one side. It is possible that the stables/coach house is older than the main house;
- older picket fences on the north and west of the garden have been replaced by high, stone-capped concrete block walls.

=== Farm ===
The property nestles between Oldbury and Newbury farms at the foot of Mt Gingenbullen (to its south-south-west) near the Medway Rivulet. It is cleared and grazed Southern Tableland country, surrounded by rural properties. The farm is treed and dammed.

=== Garden and grounds ===
The attractive gardens surrounding the homestead have been created in the English style by Karin Keighley. The plants are primarily deciduous trees and shrubs and feature in springtime with drifts of bulbs. Another point of interest is the collection of parrots displayed in aviaries. High stone walls protect part of the garden from the weather. Outside these walls a long, tree lined driveway leads up to the front gates on the Golden Vale Road.

The driveway is lined with Himalayan cedar (Cedrus deodara) interplanted with golden ash (Fraxinus excelsior 'Aurea') trees, is long and straight, curving west around the house, where a greater density of hedges and fences form yards and paddocks at the farm's core.

The service yard behind (west of) the house is gravelled and edged by outbuildings. A single gated entry to the rear of the house leads between outbuildings to it. Other gates are further north on the house's north-western side; around and further along the house garden's northern boundary.

Older picket fences on the north and west of the garden have been replaced by high, stone-capped concrete block walls.

There is also:

- a large Monterey pine (Pinus radiata) located in the centre of the driveway turning circle at the rear of the house;
- some young Quercus robur (European oak trees) planted from acorns reputedly collected in Hyde Park, London.

The oldest mature trees in the garden appear to be a Bhutan cypress (Cupressus torulosa) immediately south-west of the house which shades its small back yard, two or three large old "English" oaks (Quercus robur) in the garden's eastern end, one on the north and southern borders, and two large pin oaks (Quercus palustris) to the north of the swimming pool.

A sweep of lawn runs from the front verandah east and down a slight slope to a swimming pool and pavilion with a colonnade around it. Borders of banks of shrubs and trees flank both sides of this. An open lawn area south of the house runs around to its south-western side where this becomes a small rear yard, flanked by outbuildings.

At the garden's north-eastern corner is a hedge screening a fenced formal vegetable garden with a range of well-kept fruit such as currants, raspberries, strawberries in raised beds and open-ground beds of vegetables.

== Heritage listing ==
The Golden Valley property is significant through its associations with the early settlement of the area and its connection with Benjamin Carter who discovered the Joadja Kerosene Shale deposits. The sandstone homestead, meathouse, barn/stables and woolshed are aesthetically significant because they are well sited within a valley at the base of Ginginbullen Mountain. They are a rare example within the region of such a combination of stone and timber buildings present in a pleasant setting. The group is also significant as a landmark within the important landscape setting of Mt Gingenbullen.

Golden Vale is a two-storey sandstone house with a corrugated iron roof. The lower storey has a verandah across the front which returns halfway along either side of the house. The returns, reveals and front facades are careful masonry. The wall infill particularly at the rear is the work of labourers or apprentices. It is supported by timber columns. At the rear, an enclosed courtyard is formed by the kitchen wings. The cedar joinery throughout the house is of good quality. The house apparently expresses an unfulfilled design. The carefully executed front contrasts with the more utilitarian rear, but although the walled garden is modern there is no indication that the house has ever been accessible from the front.

Golden Valley property settled in 1856 and is an example of late Georgian farmhouse.

The original property owner Benjamin Carter discovered Kerosene Shale in the Joadja Valley in 1852. By 1873 he was mining shale and selling it to the Australian Kerosene Oil and Minerals Company.

Golden Vale was listed on the New South Wales State Heritage Register on 2 April 1999.
