= Mount Broughton =

Historic house in New South Wales, Australia

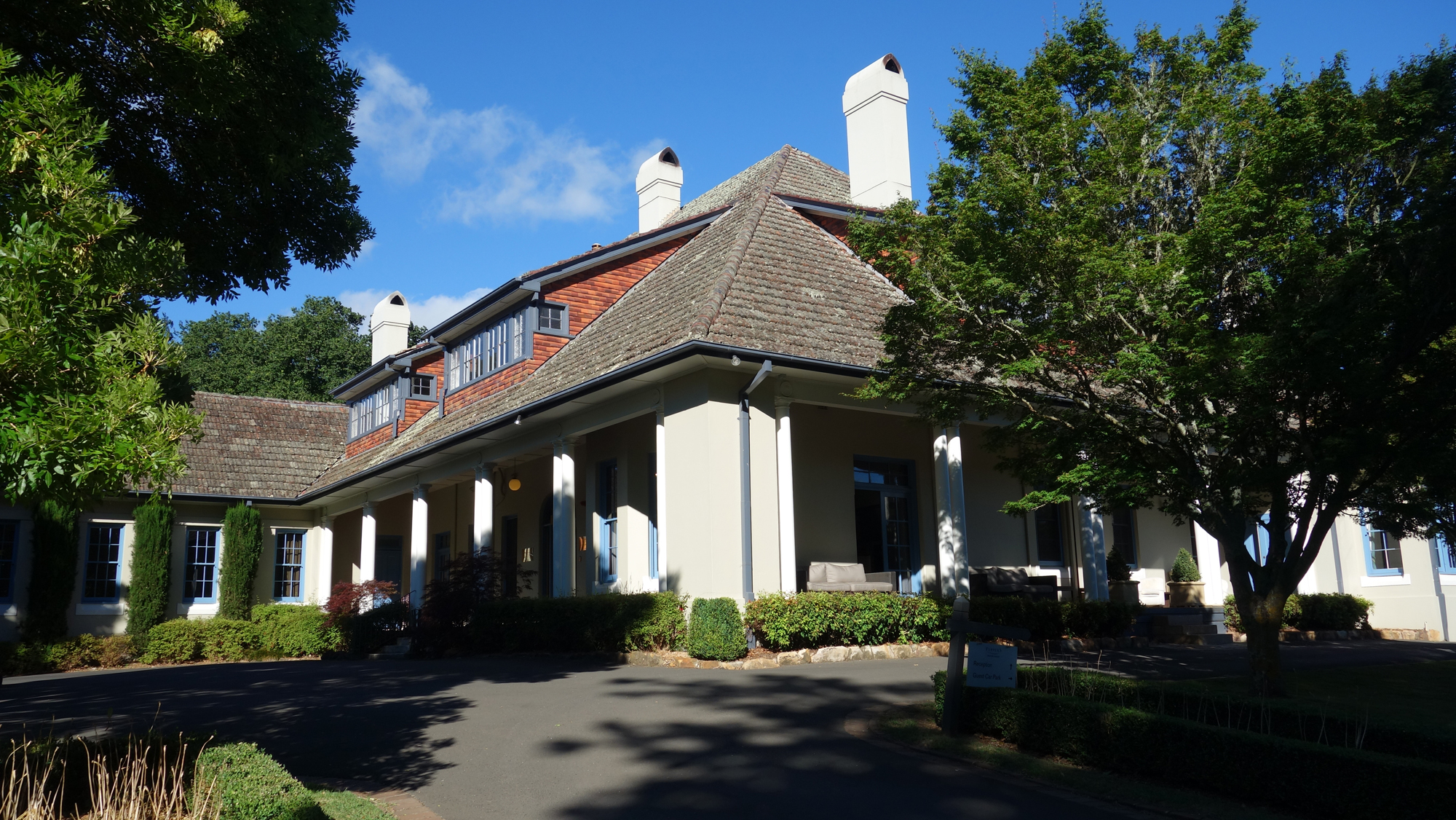
- Peppers Manor House, Sutton Forest
- Interactive map of the Mount Broughton area

General information
- Location: Sutton Forest, New South Wales, Australia
- Coordinates: 34.5714°S 150.3452°E
- Owner: Peppers Group

Website
- Peppers Manor House

Mount Broughton is a historic house located in Sutton Forest, New South Wales, Australia. It is run commercially as Peppers Manor House. The house was built in 1878 by S.C. Pepper and was the rural retreat for the Pepper family for almost one hundred years. In 1978 it was restored and opened as a country house hotel, one of the first such hotels in NSW. Later, extensions were made to convert it to a hotel and conference centre.

== Early history ==
The land surrounding Mount Broughton was originally granted to Dr Charles Throsby in 1822. Dr Throsby arrived in Sydney as a naval surgeon and later joined the famous explorer Hamilton Hume, a family friend in the exploration of the country around Sutton Forest. In 1818 he accompanied James Meehan on a journey from the Cowpastures through Moss Vale to Bundanoon Creek and south-east to Jervis Bay.

Dr Throsby died in 1824 and as he had no children his nephew also called Charles Throsby inherited the land. He named it Mount Broughton after his wife Elizabeth Broughton. After his death in 1854 the land was inherited by his sons. In 1873 Oliver Spencer Throsby advertised the property for sale as the “Mount Broughton Estate”. It was sold in 1874 and then sold again in 1878 to Henry Edward Kater.

== The Kater family ==
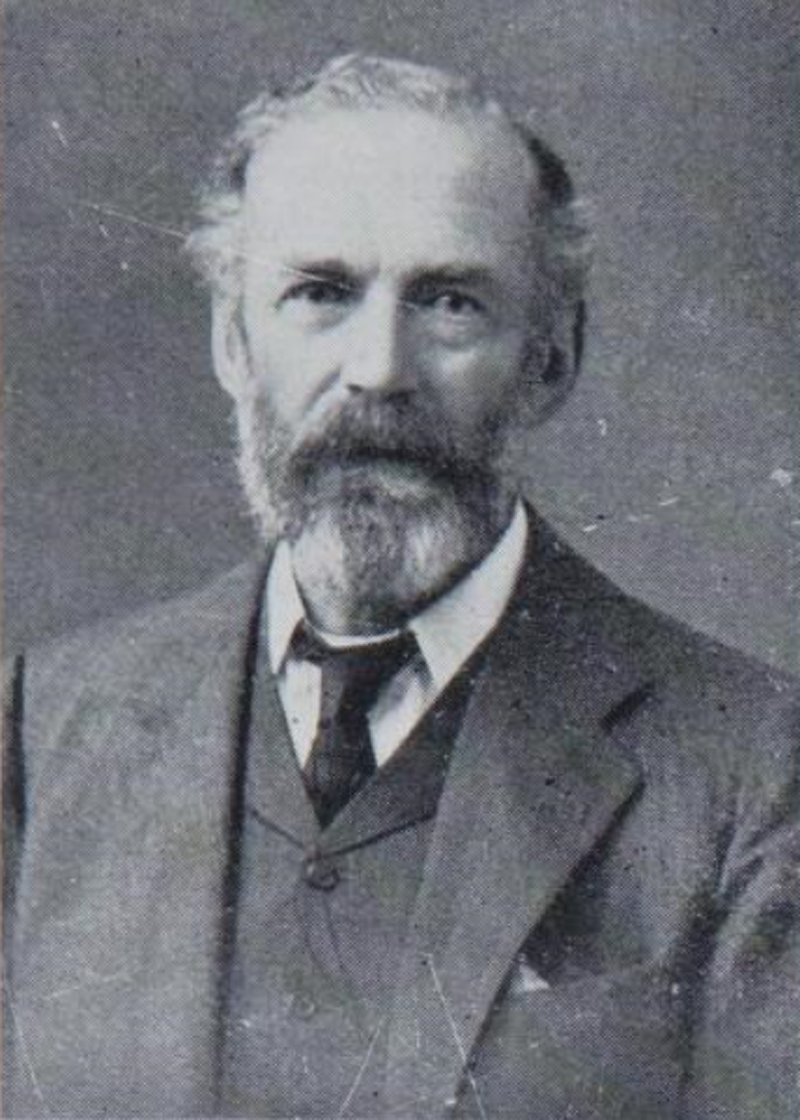
Henry Edward Kater

Henry Edward Kater (1841-1924) built a single story house on the Mount Broughton property in 1878 which was used by the family as a rural retreat and a small pastoral property. Henry was born in 1841 in Penrith. His father was Henry Herman Kater who had emigrated from England to Australia in 1839 bringing with him six thoroughbred horses which subsequently became sires of some of Australia’s famous racehorses. His mother was Eliza Charlotte Darvall, the daughter of Major Edward Darvall whom his father had married in Sydney shortly after his arrival.

In 1870 in Wellington, NSW, Henry married Mary Eliza Forster, who was the daughter of William Forster, a prominent politician and at one time the premier of New South Wales. After his marriage Henry bought a pastoral properties with his brother Edward and they formed a partnership called Kater Bros. In 1889 he became a NSW Member of the Legislative Assembly and remained in this position until his death in 1924.

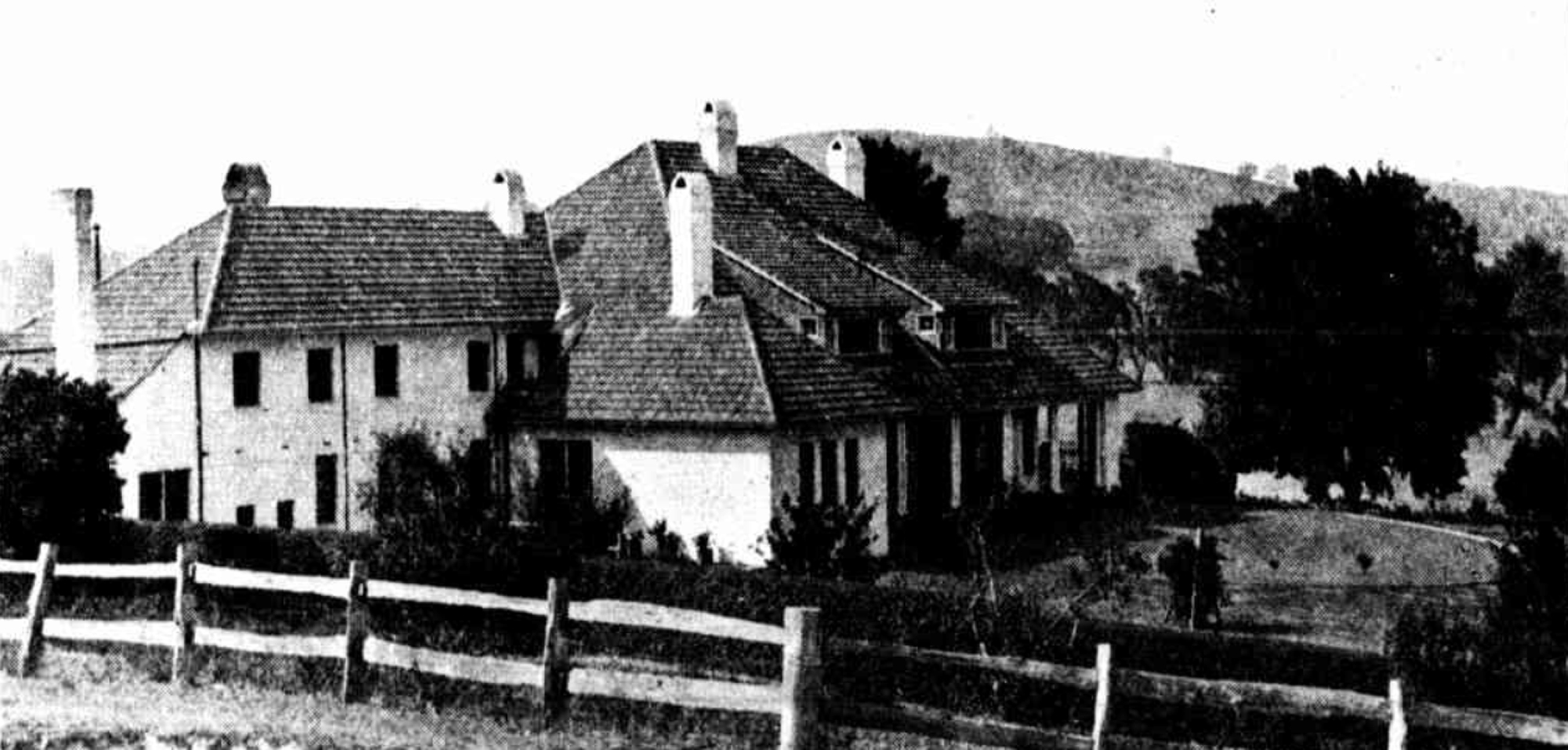
Mount Broughton in 1929

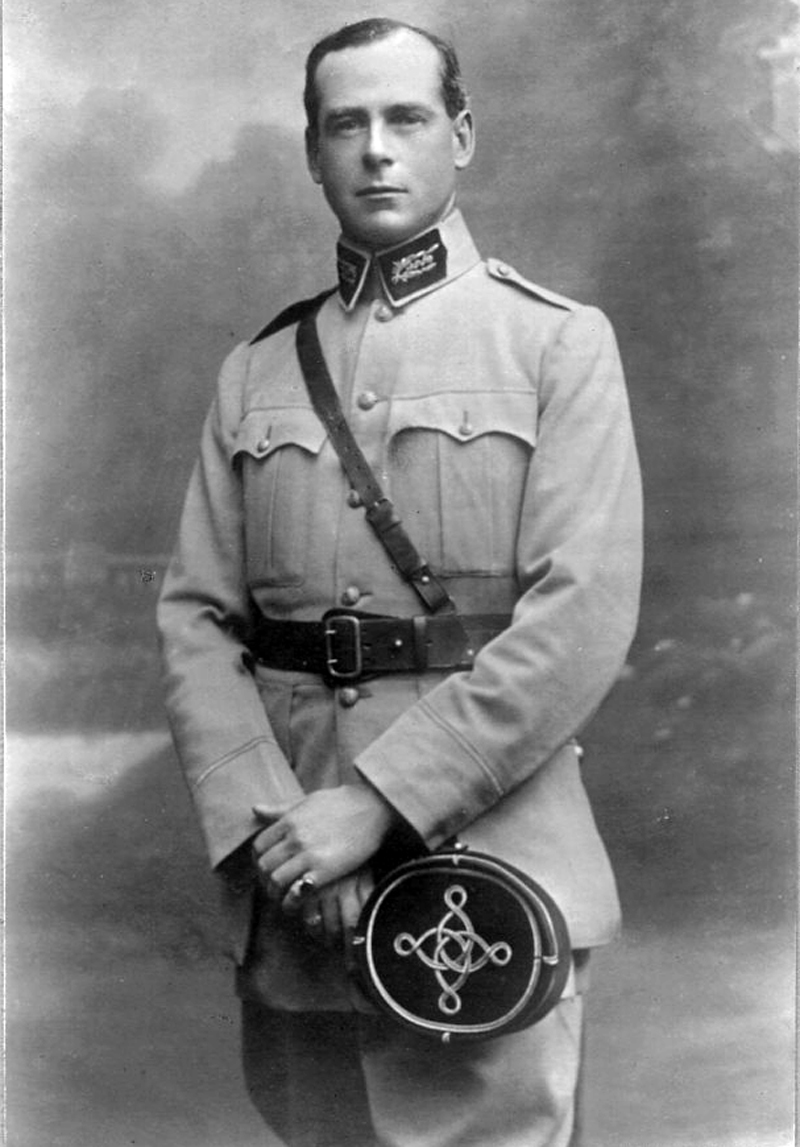
Sir Norman Kater in his French Military uniform during World War I

Between 1892 and 1924 Henry was a director of the Colonial Sugar Refining Co. and chairman in 1901-20. He was also vice-chairman of the Commercial Banking Co. of Sydney and a local director of the Liverpool and London and Globe Insurance Co. His most charitable work was for the Royal Prince Alfred Hospital as he gave the hospital its first X-ray machine and £1000 to endow the H. E. Kater ward.

When he died in 1924 his son Sir Norman Kater inherited Mount Broughton. Norman was born in 1874 in Ryde, NSW. He studied medicine at the University of Sydney and became a doctor. In 1901 he married Jean Gaerloch Mackenzie and the couple had six children four sons and two daughters. He went into partnership with his father running pastoral properties in NSW.

On the outbreak of the War he joined the French Service de Santé Militaire. A photo of him in his French military uniform is shown. He was awarded several medals for his War service.

In 1926 Norman made substantial renovations and additions to the Mount Broughton house. A photo taken after these changes is shown. His modifications transformed the house but there is still significant evidence of the original 1878 building in the Music Room, the Games Room, the north east section of the front verandah, the detached servant’s quarters and Buttery near the new Garden Wing.

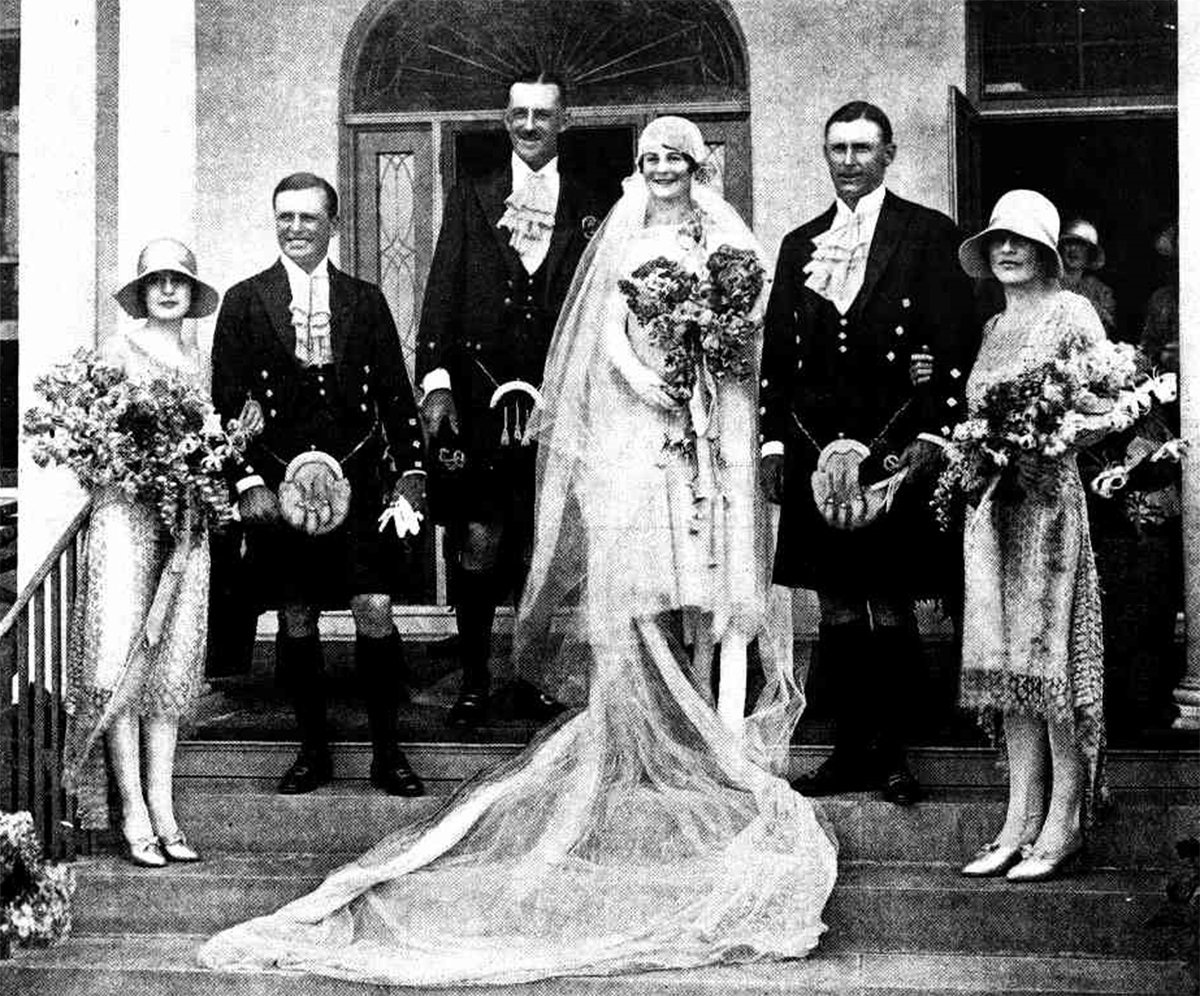
Wedding of Jean Kater at Mount Broughton in 1929.

In 1929 Norman’s daughter Jean married Ranald Munro whose Scottish family owned a sheep property in Dirranbandi in Queensland. The wedding which was held at Mount Broughtn and was described in detail in numerous newspapers throughout the country. One of these descriptions is as follows.

"The bride who was given away by her father wore an old world gown of ivory satin and tulle. The light fitting bodice was of satin and the skirt was composed of layers of tucked tulle over satin and was finished at the side with a crushed bow with long ends. The train was of dull gold tissue veiled in tulle and draped with point de gaze lace. The bride wore a veil of plain cut tulle drawn back from the face and caught with clusters of orange blossoms. She carried a shower of clematis, frangipani and knots of yellow roses."

"After the ceremony the wedding party and guests motored to Mt. Broughton (now Peppers Manor House), Moss Vale, the charming country home of the bride's parents, which was beautifully decorated for the reception, and were received on arrival by the bride's parents, Dr. and Mrs. Kater, the latter wearing a handsome powder blue ensemble and a hat to tone. On the arrival of the bride and bridegroom, a shower of tawny-coloured pansies fell from a huge flora bell as they entered the reception room at Mt. Broughton. The invited guests were over 400, who included the Premier (Mr. T. Bavin) and Mrs. Bavin, and many prominent medical men and well known station people, both in N.S.W. and Queensland."

Norman died in 1965 and the house was sold

== Recent years ==
After its sale in 1965 the house was owned by a succession of people who were interested primarily in the rich pasture land and the house fell into disrepair. The home was opened as a small guest house in the early 1970s. In 1978 Mr Paul and Mrs Diana Davies and their children completed significant conservation and restoration work, opening Mount Broughton as a country house hotel. The house is currently owned by the Peppers Group.

== See also ==
- Australian historic homesteads
