= Whitley, Sutton Forest =

Whitley
- Location within New South Wales Location within Australia
- 34.5453°S 150.3340°E
- Location: 217 Oldbury Road, Sutton Forest, Wingecarribee Shire, New South Wales, Australia

History
- Built: 1887–1892

New South Wales Heritage Register
- Official name: Whitley, outbuildings, entry gate, garden
- Type: state heritage (landscape)
- Designated: 2 April 1999
- Reference no.: 504
- Type: Homestead Complex
- Category: Farming and Grazing

Whitley is a heritage-listed residence at 217 Oldbury Road, Sutton Forest, Wingecarribee Shire, New South Wales, Australia. It was built from 1887 to 1892. It was added to the New South Wales State Heritage Register on 2 April 1999.

== History ==
The main house was erected between 1887 and 1892 as a country retreat for a Sydney judge of the Supreme Court of New South Wales, Sir William Owen. It was built on the slope of what became known as Judge's Hill, in the Tudor Revival style. In 1889 Whitley was subdivided and Oldbury Road was formed around Mount Gingenbullen (prior to this Oldbury was reached along Golden Vale Road and Atkinson's Lane from Sutton Forest).

The Owens and Heneys were responsible for the garden's early planting, and the Owens, who came from Shropshire in England, probably planted the hawthorn hedges. The oaks and elms, as evidenced by the 1896 photographs, must now be approaching ninety years of age.

It remained in the ownership of the Owen family until 1914, when it was purchased by Thomas William Heney, who in 1903 had become the first Australian editor of the Sydney Morning Herald. Heney befriended many young artists, including Ellis Rowan and Elioth Gruner. Gruner came to live at Whitley as a friend of the family.

Heney cultivated native plants in the garden and also collected Australian semi-precious stones. In 1941 the house was purchased by Edward Dryland Hordern, eldest son of Edward Carr Hordern of Wensleydale at Colo Vale. Edward was of the retailing firm Hordern Brothers in Sydney. He owned Whitley until 1947, after which the house passed through several hands until being acquired by John & Robyn Hawkins in 1980.

The oaks and elms, as evidenced in the 1896 photographs, must now be approaching 120 years of age (2018). The hedges were "laid" in the traditional English fashion in 1983 and again in 1986 by Mark Fowles, the champion hedge layer of England, from Bridgnorth in Shropshire. The plane tree (Platanus x hybrida) on the entrance lawn replaced a cherry planted by Edward Hordern about 1930. The garden now serves as a setting for Haddonstone garden ornaments, and the design and layout in its present form is the work of Robyn Hawkins, with the help of local nurserymen and horticulturists.

Several alterations have been made over the years, including the construction and later enclosure in timber shingling (c. 1980s) of wing extensions to the east and west. It is one of these wings that is to be altered to allow the proposed extension.

It was listed for sale in 1998, and in 1999, a 10-hectare holding, known as "The Dairy", was sold off. In 2002, Whitley was purchased by author Jenny Ferguson and her investment banker husband Rob for approximately $6 million. In July 2006, they reacquired "The Dairy" holding.

The Fergusons opened the gardens to the public on occasion for twenty years, ceasing in 2012.

== Description ==
=== Buildings ===
The group consists of:

- the main house, outbuildings and main entrance gates; and
- the garden

Other items include:

- a modern brick and timber garage/stables building
- coach house and other outbuildings.

Whitley is a large, two-storey house with face brickwork to ground floor level in the manner of Victorian Elizabethan/Tudor Revival. The steeply pitched, multi-gabled roof is clad with imported French Marseilles tiles. The numerous externally featured chimneys are finished with "rough cast" render. A picturesque, timber-framed, gabled porch shelters the main entrance. On the northeast elevation is a larger, flat-roofed verandah featuring squat Tuscan style columns supported on a brick balustrade wall. Windows to the main elevations are timber-framed casements and 2×2-pane double-hung sashes. Internally the major feature is an elaborate timber stair of four flights (which return on itself).

Several alterations have been made over the years, including the construction and later enclosure in timber shingling (c. 1980s) of wing extensions to the east and west. It is one of these wings that is to be altered to allow the proposed extension.

The coachhouse/stables complex is located well away from the house and screened by mature hawthorn (Crataegus oxycantha) laid hedges and other planting.

The adjacent outbuildings – including a brickwork (former Groomsman's) cottage, general purpose outbuildings and coach house – are all of face brickwork with rendered and half timbered components and steeply pitched gabled roofs matching the main house. A recent addition – an L-shaped garage/stables building in face brickwork with terracotta tiled roof (a shallow gable) – links the various outbuildings.

The entrance gates to the main drive comprise large squat face brick piers with rendered ball mouldings flanked by semi-circular dwarf walls ending in rendered ball mouldings. The present modern steel gates replace earlier timber gates.

=== Grounds and garden ===
Whitley has a mature garden estate setting for its building group. The garden's other aspects include the use of statues and small built elements. The garden is open, by invitation, to horticulture and garden history groups. The planting pattern is a feature. As you enter the gates, the bright green hedge is leyland cypress (Cuprocyparis leylandii 'Leighton's Green'). Most other hedges are hawthorn (Crataegus oxycantha). On the circular front lawn is a beech (Fagus sylvatica) hedge, and a standard weeping elm (Ulmus scabra 'Pendula'). A hybrid plane tree (Platanus x hybrida) is on the circular lawn.

There is a formal rose garden with a Haddonstone centre piece and bordered by Japanese yew (Cephalotaxus harringtonii). Nearby a grove of silver birch (Betula pendula) underplanted with blue bells. Crab-apples (Malus sp./cv.s) form a walk from the tennis-court. A large sloping flower bed below the terrace is cleverly planted with paeonies (Paeonia suffruticosa cv.s), viburnums, rhododendrons, and purple smoke bush (Cotinus coggygria "Purpurea". Rugosa roses (Rosa rugosa cv.s) form a bank below the terrace, below is "Nevada", others are "Alba" and 'L'Hay'. "Guinea" (a dark red rose) grows on the main pergola. Near the pond are two willow-leafed pear trees (Pyrus salicifolia 'Pendula') and behind the temple at the back of the pool is a semicircle of maidenhair tree (Ginkgo biloba). Many fine old trees are growing on the hill above the house - Monterey cypress (Cupressus macrocarpa]]), English elms (Ulmus procera), Himalayan cedars (Cedrus deodara) and some olives Olea europaea var. europaea cv.).

The garden of Whitley has been immaculately reconstructed, but bears no resemblance to the garden first created there.

== Heritage listing ==
Whitley is significant as it illustrates the historical development of the Sutton Forest and wider Southern Highlands area as the choice location for wealthy and socially prominent families to build their country retreats in the late 19th and early 20th centuries. As an example of Tudor Revival architecture within an Australian context, it demonstrates the overwhelming influence of British "English Countryside" architecture within Australia especially until the turn of the 20th century. By way of their ownership of the residence, it is associated with prominent people such as the Hon. Judge William Owen; Thomas William Heney, first Australian born editor of the Sydney Morning Herald, and Edward Dryland Hordern of the prominent Hordern family of retailers.

Whitley is also significant in that it exemplifies the Tudor Revival architectural style as it was applied in Australia in the late 19th century to a residence constructed for the Hon. Judge Owens as a gentleman's retreat in the Southern Highlands south of Sydney. It has certain key elements of this style such as the half timbering on the upper level of the house. It has landmark qualities due to its position on Mount Gingenbullen and its outstanding garden setting fashioned on the English pleasure ground model including hedges, trees, forest, lily pond, summer house and a commanding view of the surrounding countryside.

Whitley contributes to the identity of the Southern Highlands as an area characterised by grand residences situated on large estates that are still favoured by the wealthy and /or socially prominent as country summer or weekend retreats.

Although it forms part of a group of large highland country retreats, Whitley's Tudor Revival architectural style is distinctive in the area and therefore may contain evidence that is relevant to further understanding the area's cultural history.

Whitley is a good example of the group of large country houses within the Southern Highlands region that were built as gentlemen's residences in the late 19th and early 20th centuries, but is rare in that it is the only example among this group that was constructed in the Tudor Revival style.

The Whitley Group is significant within the local area and region as a substantial and picturesquely located property, representative of the important group of large country residences built in the 1880s and 90s by prominent Sydney families which established the social character of the Bowral-Moss Vale-Sutton Forest area and contributed to the development of the area as a place for rural retreats. The property as a whole with its mature tree plantings and hedges is also significant because of its aesthetic qualities which contribute to the character of the distinctive rural landscape of the Mt Gingenbullen slopes.

Whitley was listed on the New South Wales State Heritage Register on 2 April 1999.
