= Sutton Forest, New South Wales =

Sutton Forest
- Town
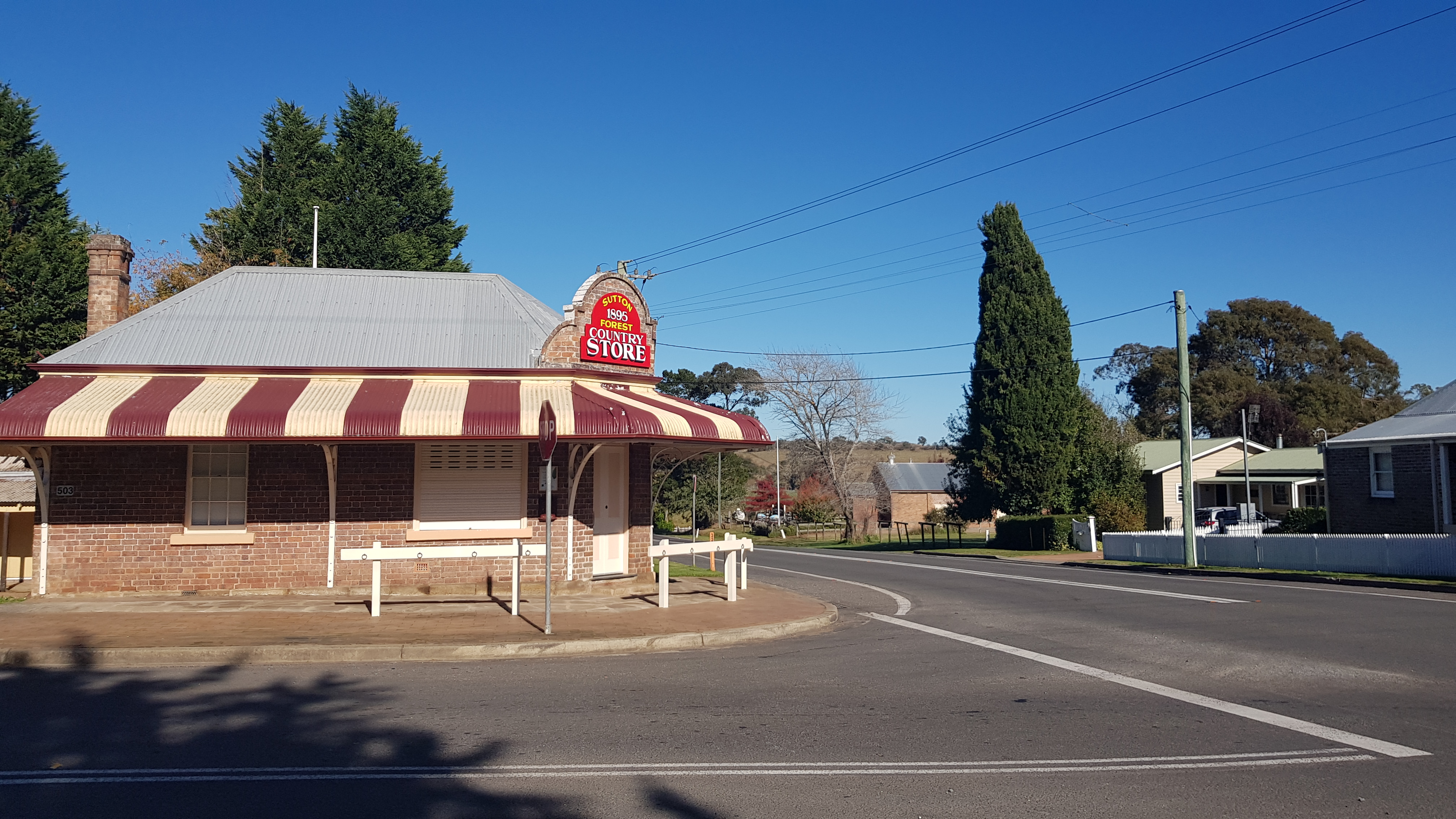
- Sutton Forest Country Store, 2023

- Coordinates: 34°34′S 150°19′E
- Country: Australia
- State: New South Wales
- Region: Southern Highlands
- LGA: Wingecarribee Shire
- Location: 5 km (3.1 mi) W of Moss Vale; 141 km (88 mi) SW of Sydney; 61 km (38 mi) NE of Goulburn

Government
  - State electorate: Goulburn
  - Federal division: Whitlam
- Elevation: 661 m (2,169 ft)

Population
  - Total: 504 (SAL 2021)
- Postcode: 2577
- County: Camden
- Parish: Sutton Forest
Localities around Sutton Forest
Belanglo	Medway	Berrima
Canyonleigh	Sutton Forest	Moss Vale
Marulan	Bundanoon	Exeter

Sutton Forest is a small village in the Southern Highlands, New South Wales, Australia in Wingecarribee Shire. It is located 5 km southwest of Moss Vale on the Illawarra Highway. Sutton Forest was originally granted, then owned by Navy Chief officer, Captain John Nicholson who recently emigrated from Cumbria, England to Australia. This privately owned estate was originally 700 acres, this is where John Nicholson lived and died.

Sutton Forest is located in an agrarian setting and is surrounded by farms, vineyards and is home to manor homes and estates. It is in one of the oldest areas settled by Europeans in Australia after Sydney and is somewhat reminiscent of an English village due to the temperate Southern Highlands climate and high rainfall.

Sutton Forest comprises two churches, an inn, and two specialty shops.

In 2004, a proposal to locate Sydney's second airport in Sutton Forest met with fierce opposition from locals.

It was one of the first colonial settlements outside Sydney and thus has many heritage buildings such as the Hillview Heritage Hotel which was built in 1850s.

It is home to the historical Peppers Manor House, Sutton Forest also known as Mount Broughton.

== Etymology ==
In 1819 it was named by Governor Lachlan Macquarie after Charles Manners-Sutton, 1st Viscount Canterbury, a speaker of the House of Commons. The surrounding area is part of the lands administrative unit of the Sutton Forest Parish.

== Population ==
According to the 2016 census, Sutton Forest had a population of 477. 81.2% of people were born in Australia and 88.4% of people only spoke English at home. The most common responses for religion were Anglican 33.5%, Catholic 23.5% and no religion 22.0%.

At the 2021 census, 504 people were recorded at Sutton Forrest.

== Churches ==
- All Saints' Anglican Church and Churchyard
- St Patrick's Roman Catholic Church and Churchyard
- Peppers Manor House, Sutton Forest also known as Mount Broughton.

== School ==
- Sutton Forest Public School

== Heritage listings ==
Sutton Forest has a number of heritage-listed sites, including:

- Golden Vale Road: Golden Vale
- Old Illawarra Highway: Hillview
- 217 Oldbury Road: Whitley

== Notable residents ==
Nicole Kidman and Keith Urban own Bunya Hill, a 45 hectare estate and cattle stud farm within the village.
