= Adelaide Ironside =

Australian artist (1831–1867)

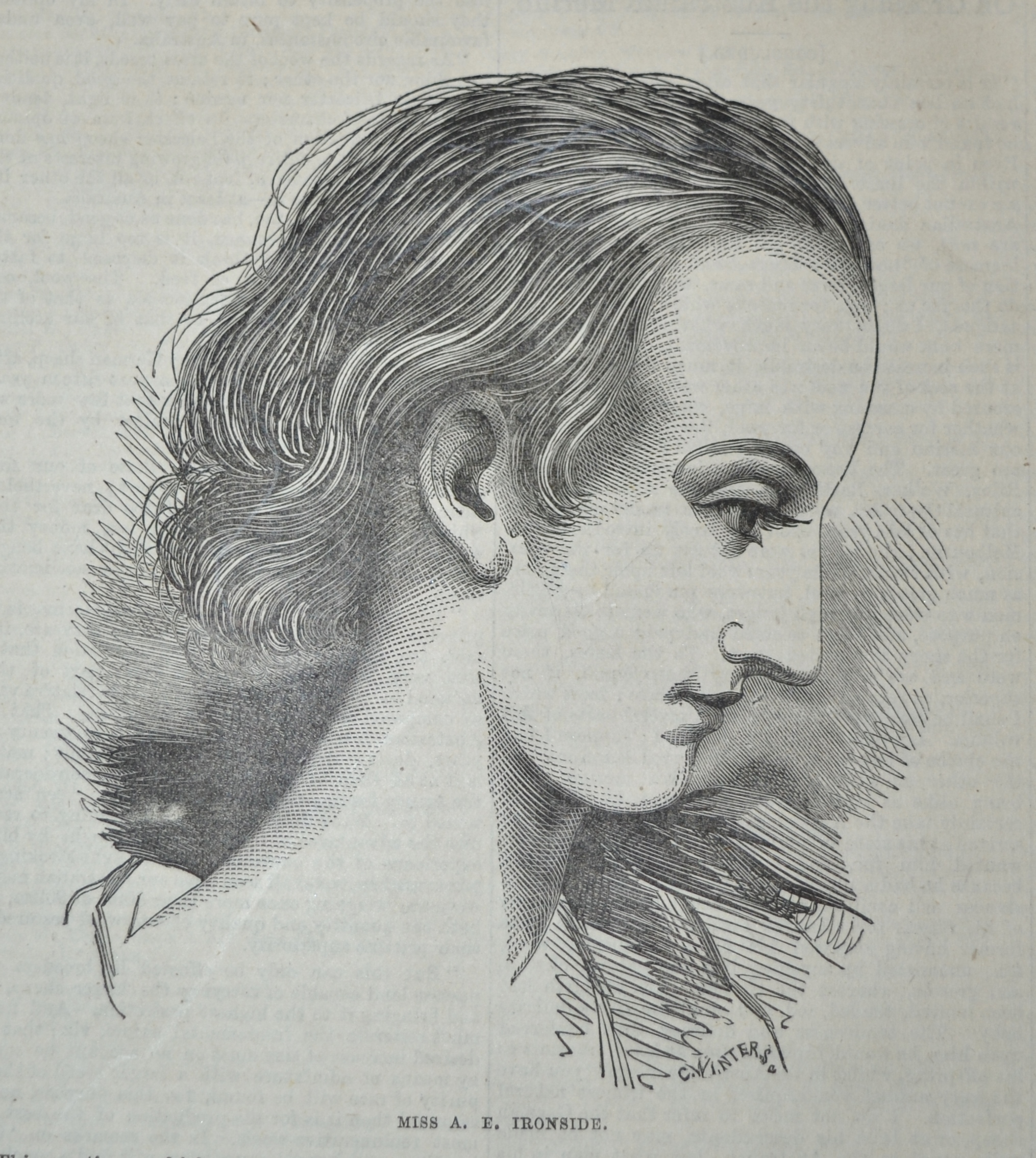
- Portrait from Australian Town & Country Journal
- Born: 17 November 1831; Sydney, Australia
- Died: 15 April 1867 (aged 35); Rome, Italy
- Known for: Painting

Adelaide Eliza Scott Ironside (17 November 1831 – 15 April 1867) was an Australian artist. Born in Sydney in 1831, she developed an early interest in languages and painting. Influenced by the views of her eventual patron, the republican writer and politician John Dunmore Lang, she eventually began publishing radical poetry and articles in local newspapers. At the age of 23, she moved to Italy with her mother to train as an artist. She developed an interest in frescoes and aspired to return to Australia to paint the walls of public buildings. She painted several portraits—her subjects included the Prince of Wales and William Charles Wentworth—along with paintings that drew on Biblical themes and the style of the Pre-Raphaelites and the Nazarene movement. Ironside died of tuberculosis in Italy in 1867 at the age of 35, after which her art largely faded into obscurity; many of her paintings are now lost.

== Life ==
Adelaide Eliza Ironside was born in Sydney on 17 November 1831 to parents James Ironside, a Scottish immigrant who worked as a commission agent, and Martha Rebecca (née Redman). After her parents separated when she was young, she was educated at home by her mother. She developed an interest in art, languages, and literature. Ironside was taught German and Latin by Matthias Goethe, and was likely taught painting by the portrait artist J. A. Wilson. She had a close relationship with the republican writer John Dunmore Lang, who also influenced her political views. She eventually began to write patriotic and republican poetry and articles for local newspapers. She published approximately 20 poems in the radical newspaper The People's Advocate and New South Wales Vindicator. In 1854 she exhibited a series of sketches, a collection of paintings of Australian flowers, and a painting titled Madonna and Child at the Australian Museum Exhibition. The following year, her portfolio of 43 works, titled Australian Wildflowers, was exhibited at the Exposition Universelle in Paris.

In April 1855, at the age of 23, Ironside moved to Europe with her mother to train as a painter. After spending a period in London, they settled in Rome in a neighbourhood near the Spanish Steps that was home to many English-speaking immigrants. Ironside began training as an artist, becoming the first artist born in Australia to train as an artist overseas. In 1858, she began studying fresco painting in Perugia. There, she studied with a Camaldolese monk at the Church of San Severo. She aspired to return to Australia and paint frescoes on the walls of public buildings in Sydney, and was particularly keen to paint the walls of the Great Hall at the newly established University of Sydney. However, efforts by Lang to secure a government subsidy to fund Ironside's studies were unsuccessful; his request for a grant of £200 was rejected by the New South Wales Legislative Assembly in 1860. In 1859 Ironside produced her first major work, a painting titled The Pilgrim of Art Crowned by the Genius of Art.

In 1861, at the invitation of Pope Pius IX, Ironside began studying frescoes painted by Fra Angelico at the Convent of San Marco in Florence. She was also permitted to make copies of artworks held in the Vatican's collections. That year, she completed her next major painting, Marriage at Cana in Galilee. She hoped to sell the painting to an Australia buyer who would exhibit it in a public building, but a subscription organised by Lang raised just £32.10 of the £1000 she had hoped to secure. Ironside expressed frustration towards Australia for its lack of recognition of her art.

The following year, Ironside began a tour of England and Scotland, but began to suffer a decline in her health. In 1863, she was admitted to the Accademia dei Quiriti, and the following year she completed her final painting, Manifestation of Christ to the Gentiles. She died in Rome of tuberculosis on 15 April 1867 at the age of 35.

== Art and legacy ==
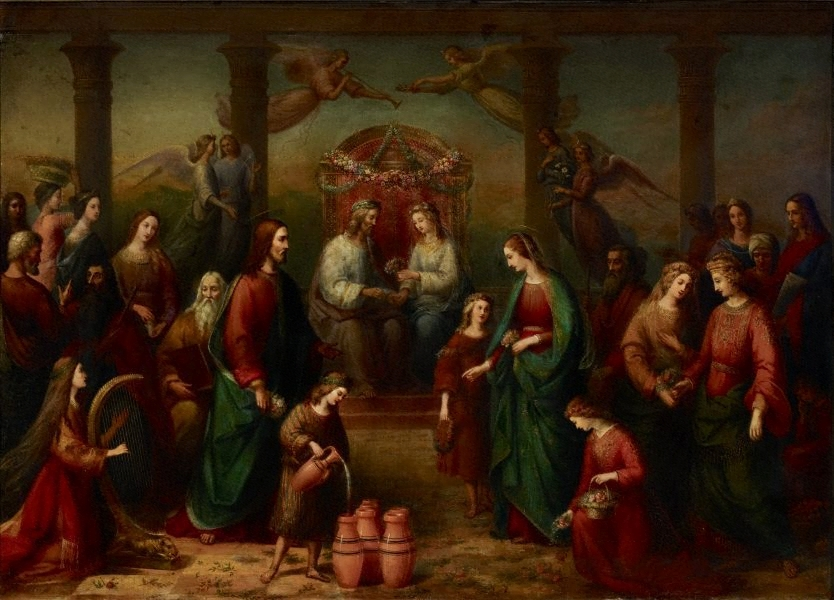
Marriage at Cana in Galilee

The majority of Ironside's paintings centre on religious themes, while others depict what she witnessed during séances as a medium. Her artistic style was influenced by the Nazarenes—a movement of German Romantic painters active in Rome in the early nineteenth century—and by the Pre-Raphaelites. She produced three major works: The Pilgrim of Art Crowned by the Genius of Art (1859), Marriage at Cana in Galilee (1861), and Manifestation of Christ to the Gentiles (1864). The first of these works depicts the "Pilgrim", a representation of Ironside herself, having a crown of thorns and laurels placed upon her head by the "Genius of Art", a representation of her mother. The second, which was influenced by the works of the Renaissance painter Pietro Perugino, depicts Christ's transformation of water into wine at a wedding feast. Ironside modelled her depiction of Christ on the Italian general Giuseppe Garibaldi. In addition to her paintings, Ironside produced frescoes, many of which were inspired by the work of Renaissance painters. She painted portraits of the Prince of Wales and of William Charles Wentworth, who each paid her £500.

While Ironside was praised by some of her fellow artists during her lifetime, her paintings largely faded into obscurity after her death. The historian Ros Pesman writes that her biblical subject matter and Nazarene influences may have contributed to the lack of attention paid to her art, as well as her gender and limited body of work. Pamela Bell points out that by the early 1860s, her Pre-Raphaelite and Nazarene influences and her biblical subject matter were no longer in style. The Pilgrim of Art Crowned by the Genius of Art and The Marriage at Cana in Galilee were exhibited at the National Art Gallery of New South Wales upon its opening, and were included in an exhibition of Ironside's work that was held in Sydney in 1870–1871 upon her death. Her painting The Marriage at Cana in Galilee was displayed at St Paul's College, University of Sydney for more than 100 years, and is now exhibited at the Art Gallery of New South Wales. Her other two major works have been lost.
