= Edward Reeve =

Edward Reeve (1822 – May 1889) was a journalist and public servant in New South Wales, remembered as an art connoisseur and playwright.

== History ==
Reeve was born in Locking, Somerset, the fourth son of lieutenant John Andrewes Reeve, R.N., and educated at Bristol College (Note: This Bristol College was a short-lived (1831–1841) Anglican school. Its first principal was J. H. Jerrard, succeeded by Bromby, and lastly, for a few months, Dr J. Booth.) when J. E. Bromby was principal, with a view to an ecclesiastical career.

Reeve emigrated to New South Wales in 1840. He worked as a clerk in the Central Police Court, then around 1857 joined the literary staff of the Sydney Morning Herald, for many years on the Parliamentary reporting Parliament and the law courts. Around 1860, while holding that post, he was appointed Curator of the Nicholson Museum of Antiquities at the Sydney University, and was energetic and assiduous in documenting the collection. He published its first catalogue, for which he was widely commended, and wrote on the early history of the university, with descriptions of the stained glass windows.

He was the author of an historical drama Raymond, the Lord of Milan, based on Milanese History in the 13th century, which was published by Hawksley and Cunninghame in 1851 and produced in Sydney, starring H. N. Warner, Mrs Charles Poole, and Mr. Burford.

He was author of a Gazetteer of Central Polynesia, published first in the Herald, 14 May 1857 – 7 August 1857 then in booklet form, for which he received a vote of thanks from His Hawaiian Majesty Kamehameha V on 13 September 1858.

He also wrote many unpublished poems and several stories: The Caliph and the Slave, The Holy Child, The Schoolboy's Reverie. He also published a Treatise on Education in New South Wales, held by the Parliamentary Library.

He is acknowledged as the founder (or with E. L. Montefiore (c. 1820 – October 1894) cofounder) in 1871, of the New South Wales Academy of Art, whose patron was the Governor, the Earl of Belmore; president Thomas Sutcliffe Mort; vice-president Montefiore and Reeve himself as secretary. The Council included J. H. Thomas, William Wallis, James A. C. Willis, Thomas Hodgson, Lewis Steffanoni (c. 1836 – 29 May 1880), Professor Charles Badham, and Robert Tooth. Reeve was forced to resign the secretaryship on 7 October 1873, and was succeeded by Eccleston Du Faur. None of these gentlemen was a recognised artist (though J. H. Thomas was a brother of William Cave Thomas); rather they were wealthy collectors who were content to show their collections, and perhaps dispose of some works by means of raffles or art unions. Of ordinary members, one whose name is recognised today as an artist is Conrad Martens. The Academy eventually became the National Art Gallery of New South Wales.

He returned to the Civil Service, and was appointed Police Magistrate at Gosford, and subsequently at Port Macquarie. He died after a long illness.
