= Sutton Forest Public School =

Location
- Sutton Forest, New South Wales; Australia
- 34°34′06″S 150°19′13″E

Information
- Type: Public, co-education, primary, day
- Established: 1871
- Closed: December 2014
- Grades: K-6
- Enrolment: 11
- Colours: Navy blue, royal blue and light blue
- Website: Sutton Forest Public

Sutton Forest Public School was a school in Sutton Forest, New South Wales, Australia operating from 1880 to December 2014. The school emerged from a denominational school operated by the Church of England from ca. 1830. The number of students fluctuated through the years of its existence, but the school was finally closed due to low enrolment and a lack of demand in the area.

== History ==
While the precise date that the school opened is not known, it was in operation by 1830, when it had 18 pupils. A small school, operated by the Church of England under the Denominational Schools Board, it grew to 42 by 1842. By 1846, it consisted of "two neat little whitened cottages" situated next to the Sutton Forest church, according to a Sydney Morning Herald article of the time. Classes were held inside the teacher's house until they outgrew the space; by 1862, when the school had 66 pupils, they were being held in the church itself. Schools Inspector Isaac Coburn recommended constructing additional space that year, but his recommendations were not immediately enacted. Only following the closure of a nearby Roman Catholic school in 1869, when the number of students increased to 72, did the wardens contact the Council of Education to request a new space. The initial offering, into which the school relocated the following year, proved unsatisfactory, and in 1871 the school moved to a new building. The 30 foot by 20 foot school was, according to the inspector, "a commodious and airy weatherboard structure very fairly fitted up but there are no appointments in the playground".

The new building would soon be replaced when in December 1879 a stone school building intended to hold 88 pupils was completed on a lot of over four acres on the main road. The denominational school was closed, with its teacher appointed to preside over the new Sutton Forest Public School. The initial student body of 44 pupils rose rapidly to 80 in 1885; by that time, the school had been expanded to include an assistant teacher, a weather shed, a kitchen, and an extra residence room.

Enrolment fluctuated over subsequent years, with 67 in 1906 followed by a sharp rise in the 1910s and a decline to 30 students in 2013. At the time the school closed in December 2014, it had 11 students.

The land on which the school stands was sold by Auction in May 2016.

== Principals ==
- 1880 to .. .. .. .. John Whitehead
- 1887 to .. .. .. .. George Graham
- 1904 to 1906 .. .. J O Miller
- 1906 to .. .. .. .. Mr Ackman
- 1919 to 1924 .. .. W H Roberts
- to 1939 .. .. Aaron Phillips
- 1941 to 1960s .. .. Stanley Taylor
- 1979 to .. .. .. .. Anthony Hong
- to 1990 .. .. Ross Bull
- 1990 to 1999 .. .. Lawrence Connery
- 2000 to 2005 .. .. Paul Kane
- 2006 to 2014 .. .. Jacqueline Crockford

== See also ==
- List of government schools in New South Wales
- Sutton Forest
