= Goulburn Chronicle and Southern Advertiser =

The Goulburn Chronicle and Southern Advertiser was a weekly English language newspaper published in Goulburn, New South Wales from 1855–1864.

== History ==
The Goulburn Chronicle and Southern Advertiser, made its debut appearance on Saturday 7 July 1855. At this time, it joined the Southern District's only other newspaper, The Goulburn Herald and County of Argyle Advertiser. The Chronicle was a weekly, 8-page paper, angled toward political liberalism and with a particular interest in land issues.

The first number of a weekly newspaper, long promised to the southern district, made its appearance on Saturday morning, and from the opinion generally expressed here of its first issue, we augur for the Goulburn Chronicle and Southern Advertiser great success

— SMH Correspondent, The Sydney Morning Herald, 11 July 1855

The Chronicle ceased independent publication altogether when it was bought out by rival publishers, William Russell Riley and John W Chisholm of The Goulburn Herald. The first issue of the newly incorporated Goulburn Herald and Chronicle appeared on 1 April 1864.

== Editors and apprentices ==
Founders of The Chronicle in 1855 were William Edward Vernon and Ludolf Theodore Mellin, who had begun their working relationship as printers of the Illustrated Sydney News. On announcing the cessation of their "part-proprietorship" with that journal in March 1854, they then approached Goulburn solicitor and political activist Daniel Deniehy to offer him an editorial share in their new venture, The Goulburn Chronicle. Deniehy declined the offer, being unable to afford two hundred pounds for the third share. By July 1855, after some initial setup difficulties, Vernon and Mellins' new paper, The Goulburn Chronicle and Southern Advertiser, was in production.

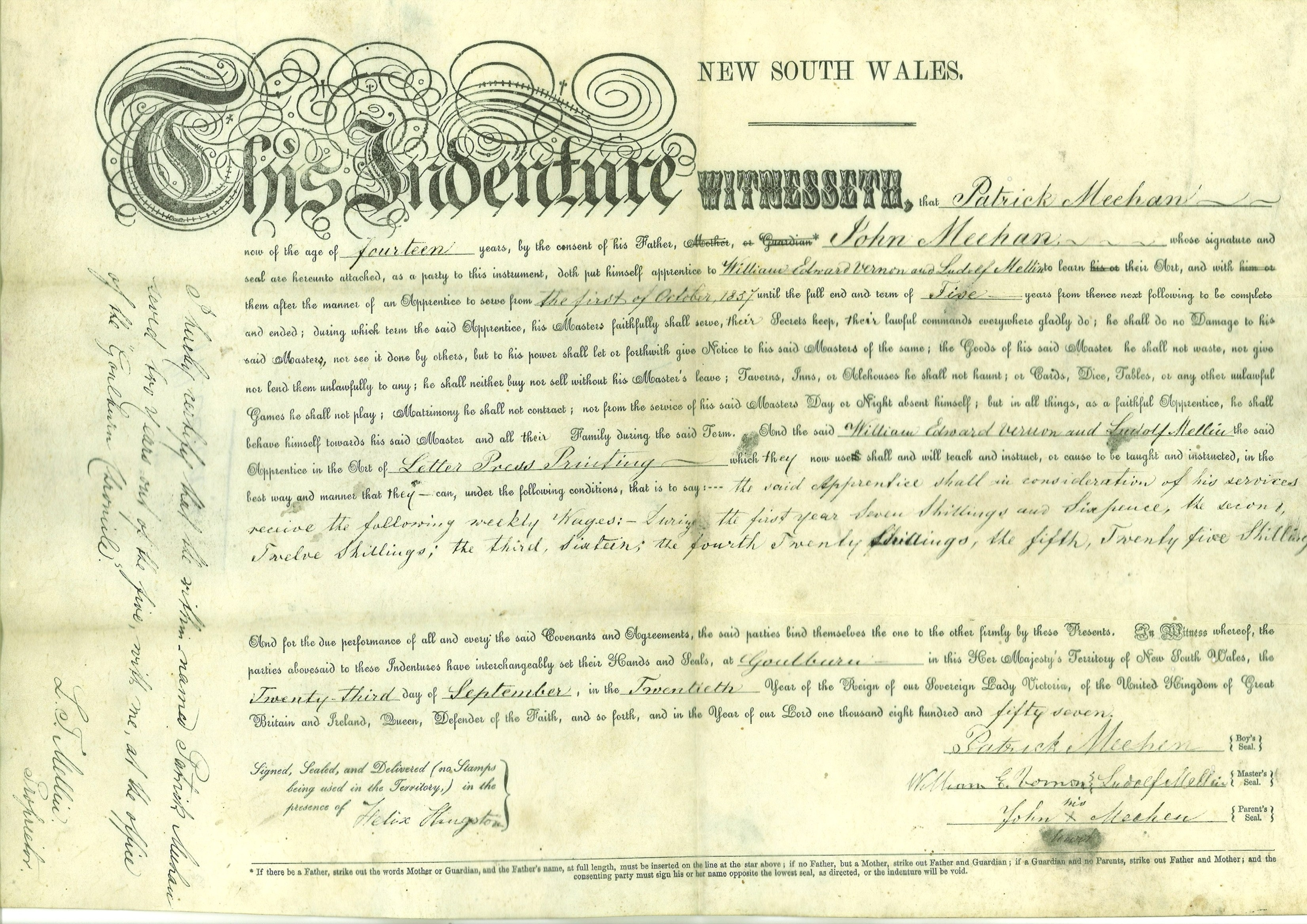
Notice of the indenture of Patrick Meehan as an apprentice in 1857 to the Goulburn Chronicle and Southern Advertiser

In 1857, at the age of 14, Patrick Meehan was taken on for a five-year apprenticeship in letterpress printing at The Chronicle. His indenture continued for two years, until Mellin was charged with Meehan's assault. The case was dismissed, but Meehan's indentures were subsequently cancelled by a court order.

Alfred Ellis, former sub-editor of the Empire, joined The Chronicle in 1860, building its circulation almost equal to that of the Herald. Ellis left The Chronicle in 1863 due to ill health, retiring to nearby Jerrara Creek.

On 2 January 1862, at age 35, Chronicle founder William Edward Vernon died after a lengthy period of suffering from facial cancer in the lower lip. Surviving him were his pregnant wife Margaret, and five children. The sale of Vernon's interests and property from The Chronicle partnership were announced in June 1863. Mellin continued in proprietorship of The Chronicle for a short period following Vernon's death. Shortly thereafter The Chronicle was bought out by rival publishers, William Russell Riley and John W Chisholm of The Goulburn Herald.

Subsequently, Ludolf Mellin returned to Sydney where he progressively took over the control of his father-in-law's printing business, F Cunninghame & Co, which he ran until his death aged 69 in 1895.

== Digitisation ==
The only surviving issues of The Goulburn Chronicle are from 1860 and 1861. These have been digitised as part of the Australian Newspapers Digitisation Program project hosted by the National Library of Australia.
