= Goulburn Evening Penny Post =

1870–1957 Australian newspaper

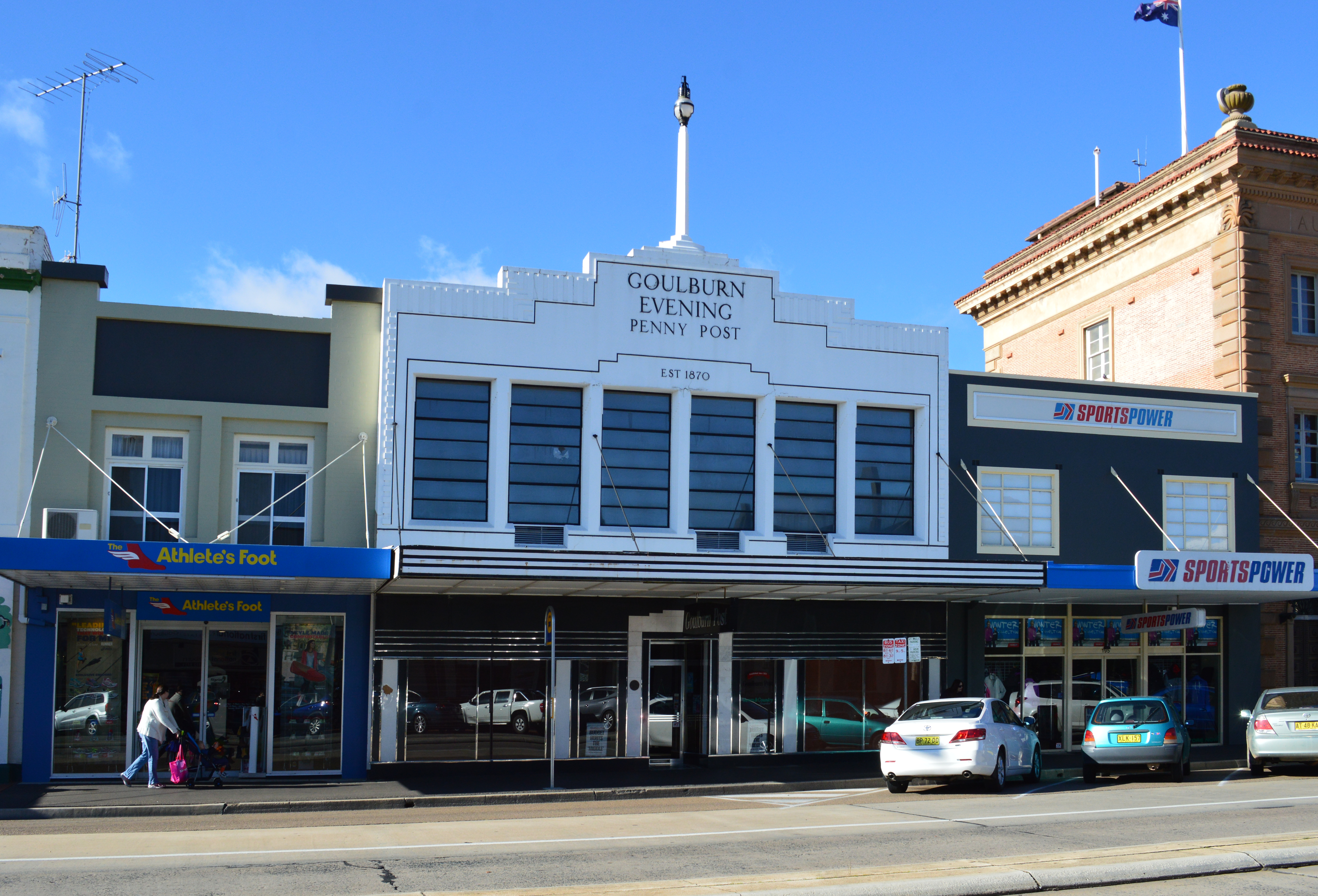
The Penny Post building in Goulburn, built in 1935

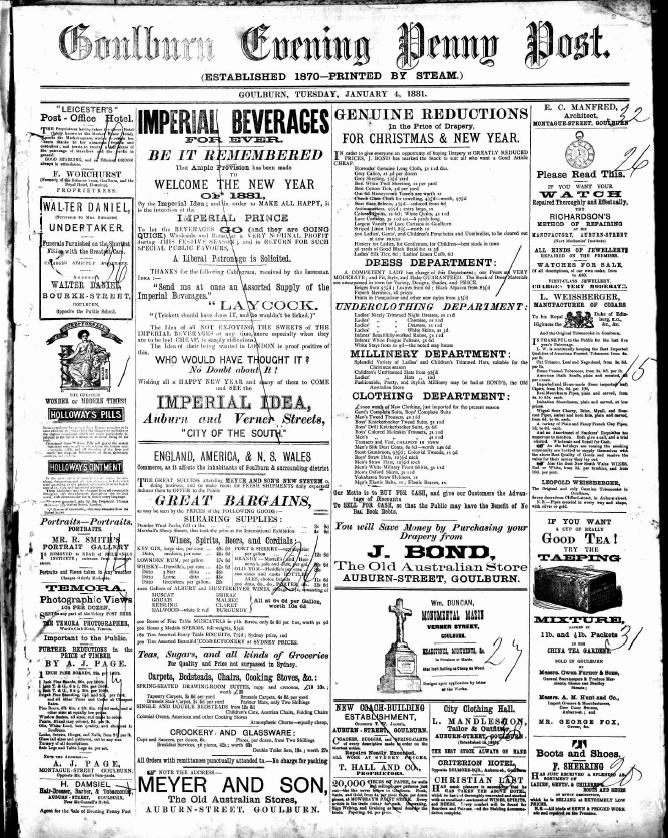
Front page of the Goulburn Evening Penny Post, Tuesday 4 January 1881

The Goulburn Evening Penny Post was an English-language newspaper published in Goulburn, New South Wales, Australia from 1870 until 1957. At various times the paper was known as Goulburn Evening Penny Post, and Southern Counties General Advertiser, Goulburn and Queanbeyan Evening Penny Post and Southern Counties General Advertiser, Goulburn and Queanbeyan Evening Penny Post and Goulburn Evening Post, and later absorbed a rival newspaper, the Goulburn Herald, before finally shortening its name to the Goulburn Post.

== History ==
The newspaper first appeared in 1870 under the masthead Goulburn Evening Penny Post, and Southern Counties General Advertiser and was published three times per week by Thomas Daniel and George Grey. It is one of the earlier newspapers in the colony commencing publication in 1870, thirty years before the federation of Australia. The paper changed names several times:

Masthead	Years of publication
Goulburn Evening Penny Post, and Southern Counties General Advertiser	1870–1876
Goulburn and Queanbeyan Evening Penny Post, and Southern Counties General Advertiser	1876–1878
Goulburn and Queanbeyan Evening Penny Post	1878–1880
Goulburn Evening Penny Post	1881–1940
Goulburn Evening Post	1940–1982
Goulburn Post	1982–present

A special edition of the Goulburn Evening Penny Post was issued on 25 October 1920, to commemorate the 100th anniversary of the founding of the city of Goulburn.

== Digitisation ==
The various versions of the paper have been digitised up until 1953 as part of the Australian Newspapers Digitisation Program project hosted by the National Library of Australia.

== See also ==
- List of newspapers in New South Wales
- List of newspapers in Australia

== Bibliography ==
- Holden, W Sprague 1961, Australia goes to press, Melbourne University Press, Melbourne.
- Mayer, Henry 1964, The press in Australia, Lansdowne Press, Melbourne.
- Walker, R B 1976, The newspaper press in New South Wales 1803–1920, Sydney University Press, Sydney.
