= Medway Rivulet =

Location
- Country: Australia

Physical characteristics
- Source
  - location: New South Wales
  - coordinates: 34°35′07″S 150°22′38″E
- Mouth
  - location: Wingecarribee River
  - coordinates: 34°29′30″S 150°14′37″E

Basin features
- Bridges: Hume Highway, Illawarra Highway

The Medway Rivulet is a river of the state of New South Wales in Australia. It is a tributary of the Wingecarribee River.

== See also ==
- List of rivers of Australia
