= Illustrated Sydney News =

Former Sydney, New South Wales based newspaper

The Illustrated Sydney News
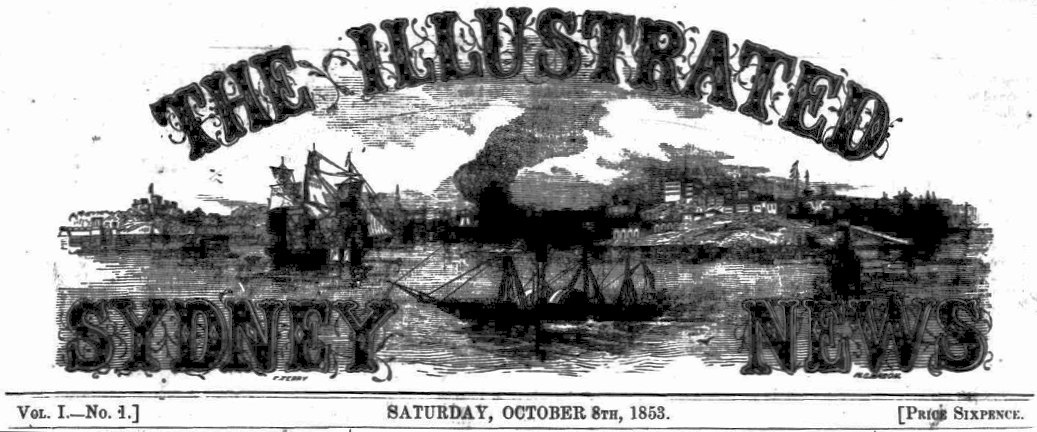

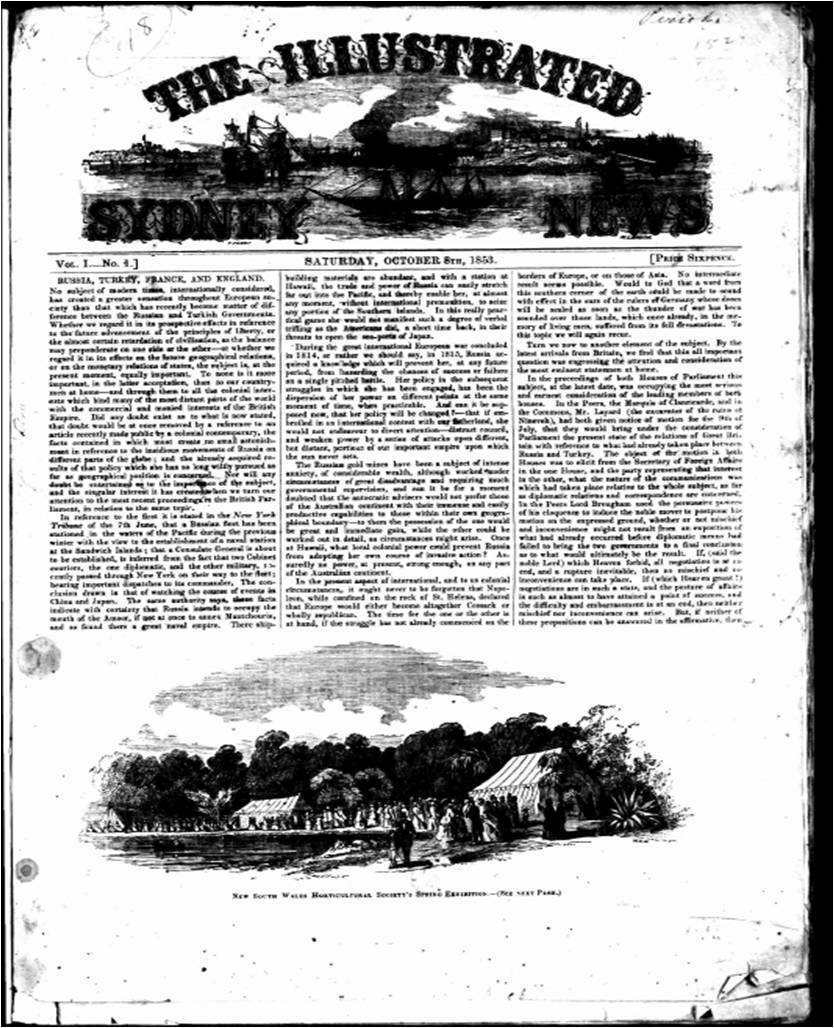
- Front page of the newspaper's first edition
- Type: Monthly newspaper
- Founder(s): Walter George Mason; William Edward Vernon; Ludolf Theodore Mellin
- Editor: Philip Holdsworth
- Founded: 8 October 1853
- Language: English
- Ceased publication: 10 February 1894
- City: Sydney
- Country: Australia

The Illustrated Sydney News was a monthly English language newspaper published in Sydney, New South Wales, Australia.

== History ==
First published on 8 October 1853 by Walter George Mason (1820 – 12 March 1866), William Edward Vernon and Ludolf Theodore Mellin. The Illustrated Sydney News was published from 1853 to 1872. From 1872 to 1881 the title was changed to The Illustrated Sydney News and New South Wales Agriculturist and Grazier and then back to the original shorter title between 1881 and 1894.

The first edition received mixed reviews in the Sydney Morning Herald.

Edward Vernon and Ludolf Mellin sold their shares of the paper within six months of its first publication and embarked on a new publication The Goulburn Chronicle and Southern Advertiser. Vernon had previously collaborated with William Kennedy between 1846–1847 to produce The Citizen in Sydney. Mellin, was a native of Braunschweig in Germany. He was a contemporary of Luise Löbbecke, the German social reformer. He was also the son-in-law of Francis Cunninghame who, with Edward Hawksley, established The People's Advocate and New South Wales Vindicator in 1848.

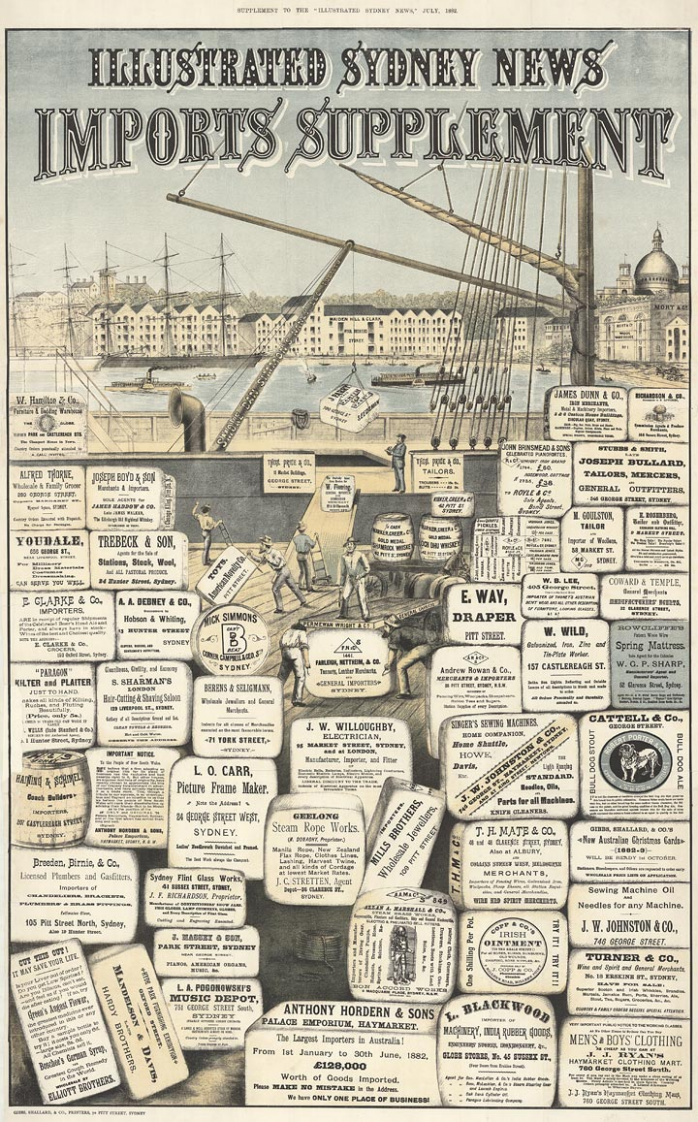
Supplement July 1882

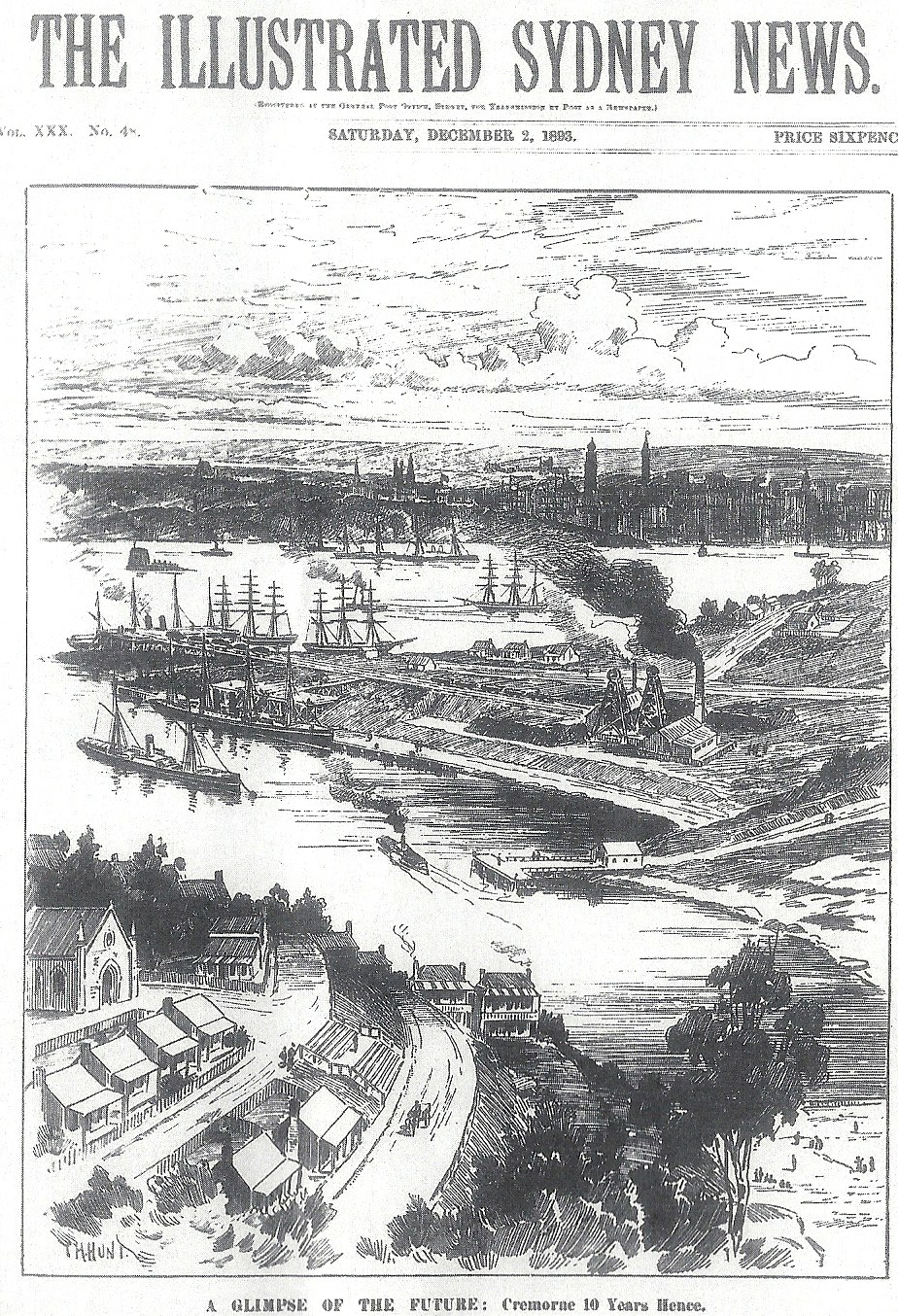
A Glimpse of the Future, 1893

Philip Holdsworth was editor from the 1880s. Until 1888, the illustrations were wood engravings, each printed in black ink and each of which took one engraver about a week to complete. In August 1888, The Illustrated Sydney News became the first Australian paper to reproduce a photograph using the new half-tone process. The slow and expensive wood engraving process was obsolete.

=== Publishing in the NSW colony ===
Most material published in the first twenty years of the New South Wales colony notified soldiers, convicts and private settlers contained "government orders" printed on a portable wooden and iron printing press and displayed or announced aloud in public places and in churches.

== Digitisation ==
The paper has been digitised as part of the Australian Newspapers Digitisation Program project at the National Library of Australia.

A list of illustrations of maritime interest to be found in the Illustrated Sydney News has been made by the Australian National Maritime Museum.

Individual issues can be viewed online at Trove.

== See also ==
- List of newspapers in Australia
