= Goulburn Herald =

Australian periodical

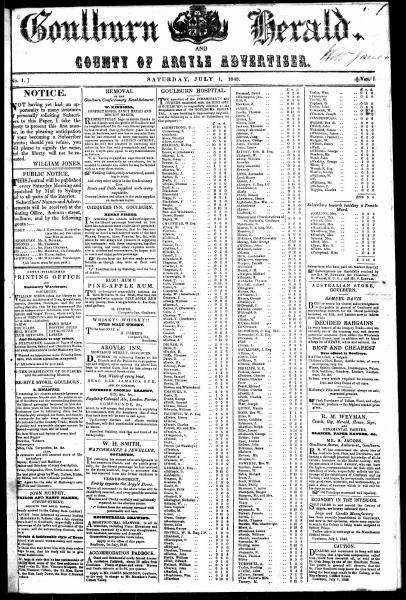
Front page of Goulburn Herald and County of Argyle Advertiser newspaper, Saturday 1 July 1848

The Goulburn Herald was an English-language newspaper published in Goulburn, New South Wales. At various times the paper was known as The Goulburn Herald and County of Argyle Advertiser and The Goulburn Herald and Chronicle. It is one of the earlier newspapers in the colony commencing publication more than fifty years before the federation of Australia.

== History ==
The newspaper was first published on Saturday, 1 July 1848 by William Jones and it passed through a number of name changes in subsequent years until it was absorbed into a competitor, The Southern Morning Herald which was later absorbed into the Goulburn Evening Penny Post. The editor of the Maitland Mercury, another N.S.W. newspaper, described the first issue of the Goulburn Herald as "one of the best first numbers we remember to have seen, inasmuch as it contains a very good amount of local news, a couple of leaders on the topics of the day, and a creditable selection of other matter". In 1850, the Goulburn Herald was one of only four newspapers published in provincial New South Wales, the area known as the Middle District, N.S.W. also included Brisbane at that time.

Masthead	Years of publication
The Goulburn Herald and County of Argyle Advertiser	1848–1859
Goulburn Herald	1860–1864
The Goulburn Herald and Chronicle	1864–1881
Goulburn Herald	1881–1907

== Digitisation ==
The various versions of the paper have been digitised as part of the Australian Newspapers Digitisation Program project hosted by the National Library of Australia.

== See also ==
- List of newspapers in Australia
- List of newspapers in New South Wales
