= Cowper ministry =

Cowper ministry may refer to:

- Cowper ministry (1856), the second ministry of the Colony of New South Wales
- Cowper ministry (1857–59), the fourth ministry of the Colony of New South Wales
- Cowper ministry (1861–63), the seventh ministry of the Colony of New South Wales
- Cowper ministry (1865–66), the ninth ministry of the Colony of New South Wales
- Cowper ministry (1870), the twelfth ministry of the Colony of New South Wales
