= Electoral results for the district of Sydney City =

Election results for Sydney City, New South Wales, Australia

Sydney City, an electoral district of the Legislative Assembly in the Australian state of New South Wales, had two incarnations, from 1950 until 1971 and from 1988 until 1999.

Election	Member	Party	Member	Party	Member	Party	Member	Party
1856	Henry Parkes	None	James Wilshire	None	Robert Campbell	None	Charles Cowper	None
Sep 1856 by	Henry Parkes	None	James Wilshire	None	Robert Campbell	None	Charles Cowper	None
Dec 1856 by	William Dalley	None	James Wilshire	None	Robert Campbell	None	Charles Cowper	None
1858	Robert Tooth	None	George Thornton	None	Robert Campbell	None	Charles Cowper	None

== Election results ==
=== 1858 ===
1858 New South Wales colonial election: Sydney City 15 January
Candidate	Votes	%
George Thornton (elected 1)	3,666	21.4
Robert Tooth (elected 2)	2,411	14.1
Robert Campbell (re-elected 3)	2,158	12.6
Charles Cowper (re-elected 4)	2,099	12.2
William Dalley (defeated)	2,035	11.9
Frank Fowler	1,762	10.3
James Wilshire (defeated)	1,557	18.7
William Allen	1,474	8.6
Total formal votes	17,164	100.0
Informal votes	0	0.0
Turnout	17,164	39.7

Robert Tooth had unsuccessfully contested Sydney Hamlets.

=== December 1856 by-election ===
1856 Sydney City by-election Tuesday 30 December
Candidate	Votes	%
William Dalley (elected)	1,998	57.2
John Fairfax	1,493	42.8
Total formal votes	3,491	100.0
Informal votes	0	0
Turnout	3,491	25.2

The by-election was caused by the resignation of Henry Parkes due to financial difficulties with his newspaper The Empire.

=== September 1856 by-election ===
1856 Sydney City by-election Thursday 4 September
Candidate	Votes	%
Charles Cowper (re-elected 1)	1,993	45.6
Robert Campbell (re-elected 2)	1,831	41.9
Thomas Duigan	542	12.4
Total formal votes	4,366	100.0
Informal votes	0	0.0
Turnout	2,183	15.7

Charles Cowper and Robert Campbell were appointed in the first Cowper ministry.

=== 1856 ===
1856 New South Wales colonial election: Sydney City
Candidate	Votes	%
Charles Cowper (elected 1)	3,073	20.5
Henry Parkes (elected 2)	3,057	20.4
Robert Campbell (elected 3)	3,041	20.33
James Wilshire (elected 4)	2,901	19.4
John Plunkett	2,800	18.7
Thomas Duigan	89	0.6
Total formal votes	14,961	100.0
Informal votes	0	0.0
Turnout	6,007	43.3

Cowper, Parkes, Campbell and Wilshire had been endorsed as a group by a public meeting to be elected to the four vacancies. Parkes, Campbell and Wilshire all represented City of Sydney in the Legislative Council while Cowper represented County of Durham. There were no political parties at the time and the combination of candidates, pejoratively referred to by Plunkett as "The Bunch", was controversial. Plunket, who had been an appointed member of the Council, campaigned on the slogan "plump for Plunket", a reference to the voting practice of voting for a single candidate rather than the four candidates an elector was entitled to vote for.

After his defeat in this seat, Plunkett unsuccessfully contested North Eastern Boroughs, before being elected for both Argyle and Bathurst (County). Plunket chose to represent Argyle and resigned as member for Bathurst (County).
