= September 1856 Sydney City colonial by-election =

By-election in New South Wales, Australia

A by-election was to be held for the New South Wales Legislative Assembly electorate of Sydney City on 4 September 1856 because of the formation of the first Cowper ministry, with Charles Cowper appointed Colonial Secretary and Robert Campbell appointed Colonial Treasurer.

== Dates ==
Date	Event
25 August 1856	Formation of First Cowper ministry.
26 August 1856	Writ of election issued by the Speaker of the Legislative Assembly.
3 September 1856	Nominations
4 September 1856	Polling day
10 September 1856	Return of writ

== Result ==
1856 Sydney City by-election Thursday 4 September
Candidate	Votes	%
Charles Cowper (re-elected 1)	1,993	45.6
Robert Campbell (re-elected 2)	1,831	41.9
Thomas Duigan	542	12.4
Total formal votes	4,366	100.0
Informal votes	0	0.0
Turnout	2,183	15.7

== See also ==
- Electoral results for the district of Sydney City
- List of New South Wales state by-elections
