= Robertson ministry =

Robertson ministry may refer to several governments of the Colony of New South Wales led by John Robertson.

- Robertson ministry (1860–1861), the sixth ministry
- Robertson ministry (1868–1870), the eleventh ministry
- Robertson ministry (1875–1877), the fifteenth ministry
- Robertson ministry (1885–1886), the 22nd ministry
