= Cowper ministry (1861–1863) =

Third New South Wales government ministry led by Charles Cowper

Third Cowper ministry
- 7th Cabinet of the Colony of New South Wales

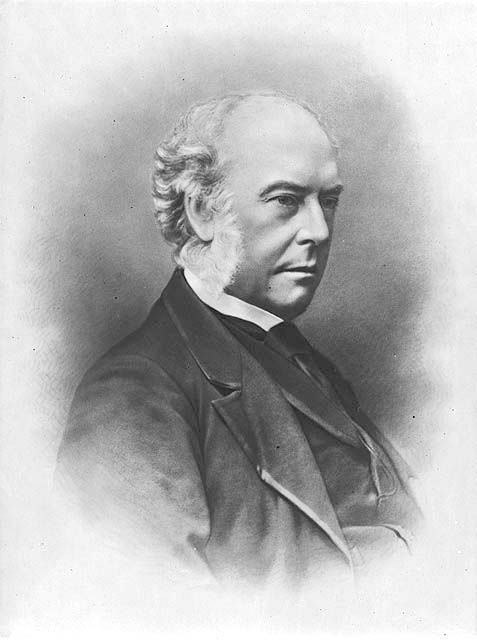
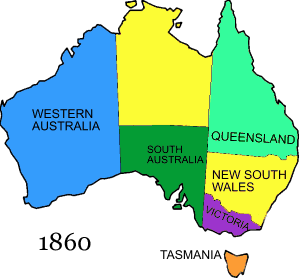
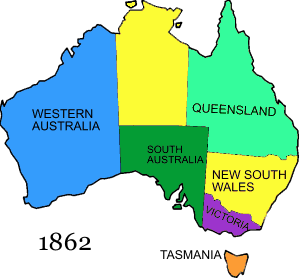
- Premier Charles Cowper and the Colony of New South Wales (1860–1862 and 1862)
- Date formed: 10 January 1861
- Date dissolved: 15 October 1863

People and organisations
- Monarch: Queen Victoria
- Governor: William Denison / Sir John Young
- Head of government: Charles Cowper
- No. of ministers: 7
- Member party: unaligned
- Status in legislature: Minority government
- Opposition party: unaligned
- Opposition leader: James Martin

History
- Predecessor: First Robertson ministry
- Successor: First Martin ministry

The third Cowper ministry was the seventh ministry of the Colony of New South Wales, and third occasion of being led by Charles Cowper.

Cowper was elected in the first free elections for the New South Wales Legislative Assembly held in March 1856, and fought unsuccessfully with Stuart Donaldson to form Government. When Donaldson's Government faltered a little over two months after it was formed, Cowper formed Government on the first occasion, but he also lost the confidence of the Assembly a few months later. Cowper formed Government on the second occasion between 1857 and 1859; but it also lost the confidence of the Assembly. Cowper was again asked to form Government following the decision by Premier John Robertson to step aside and focus on land reform. Each of the ministers retained their portfolios from the first Robertson ministry, with the only change being that Cowper replaced Robertson as the leader.

The title of Premier was widely used to refer to the Leader of Government, but not enshrined in formal use until 1920.

There was no party system in New South Wales politics until 1887. Under the constitution, ministers were required to resign to re-contest their seats in a by-election when appointed, although in general the minister was re-elected unopposed. Because each of the ministers retained their appointments from the Robertson ministry, no by-elections were initially required. Charles Cowper Jr. was opposed at the 1861 by-election for The Tumut, but was comfortably re-elected. Thomas Smart (The Glebe) was re-elected unopposed in May 1863, following his appointment as Colonial Treasurer.

The appointment of John Darvall QC as Attorney General in 1863 however was controversial, not only as he was a conservative appointed to the liberal ministry, but because John Hargrave, who had been Attorney General since March 1860, accepted the lesser role of Solicitor General to allow Darvall to be appointed. Darvall was challenged by his friend Henry Parkes at the East Maitland by-election in a campaign marked by person attacks.

This ministry covers the period from 10 January 1861 until 15 October 1863, when Cowper was defeated amidst criticism of the ministry's financial management.

== Composition of ministry ==
Portfolio	Minister	Term start	Term end	Term length
Premier	Charles Cowper	10 January 1861	15 October 1863	2 years, 278 days
Colonial Secretary	Charles Cowper	10 January 1861 (Note: Continued in role from First Robertson ministry.)	15 October 1863	2 years, 278 days
Colonial Treasurer	Elias Weekes	10 January 1861	20 March 1863	2 years, 69 days
Colonial Treasurer	Thomas Smart	21 March 1863	15 October 1863	208 days
Secretary for Lands	John Robertson MLA / MLC / MLA (Note: John Robertson was appointed to the Legislative Council on 2 April 1861 to promote the Robertson land bills in the council, resigning on 1 October 1861 after they were passed and was re-elected to the Legislative Assembly.)	10 January 1861	15 October 1863	2 years, 278 days
Secretary for Public Works	William Arnold	10 January 1861	15 October 1863	2 years, 278 days
Attorney General	John Hargrave MLC	10 January 1861	31 July 1863	2 years, 202 days
Attorney General	John Darvall QC (Note: John Hargrave accepted the lesser role of Solicitor General to allow John Darvall QC to be appointed Attorney General.)	1 August 1863	15 October 1863	75 days
Solicitor General	John Hargrave MLC	1 August 1863	15 October 1863	75 days
Representative of the Government in the Legislative Council	John Hargrave MLC	10 January 1861	15 October 1863	2 years, 278 days
Clerk of the Executive Council	Charles Cowper Jr.	1 September 1861	15 October 1863	2 years, 44 days

Ministers are members of the Legislative Assembly unless otherwise noted.

== See also ==
- Self-government in New South Wales
- Members of the New South Wales Legislative Assembly, 1860–1864
- First Cowper ministry (1856)
- Second Cowper ministry (1857–1859)
- Fourth Cowper ministry (1865–1866)
- Fifth Cowper ministry (1870)

Preceded by First Robertson ministry	Third Cowper ministry 1861–1863	Succeeded by First Martin ministry
