= Robert Tooth =

Australian politician

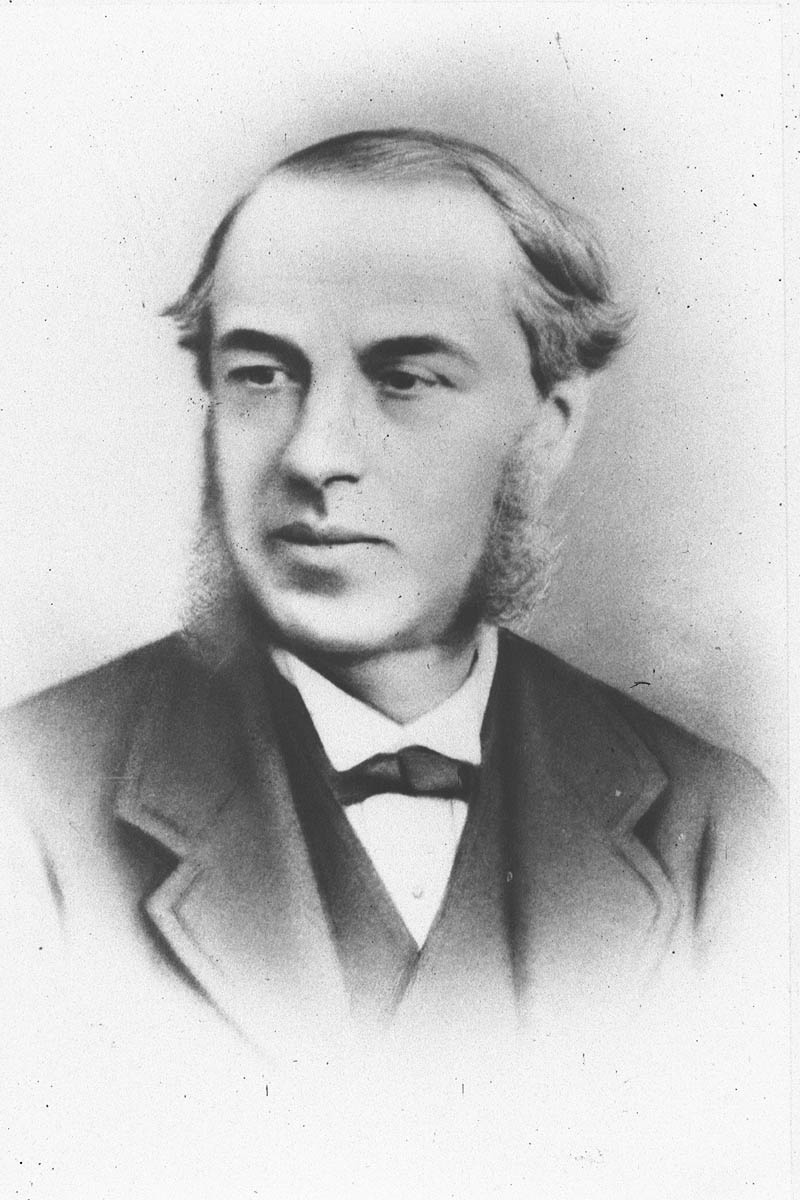
Robert Tooth

Robert Tooth (28 May 1821 in Cranbrook, Kent, England – 19 September 1893 in Bedford, England) was one of three brothers of Sydney's Tooth brewery family. He built two of Sydney's grandest houses, Cranbrook House and The Swifts.

== Early life ==
Robert was the first son of Robert Tooth (b.1799) and Mary Ann (née Reader), a hops merchant of Swifts Park, Cranbrook, Kent, England. His brothers were Edwin (1822–1858), Frederick (1827–1893), Rev Charles Tooth (1831–1894) and Rev Arthur Tooth (1839–1931). His uncle was John Tooth (b. 1803), Cranbrook merchant and brewer, who first migrated to Sydney in the Bencoolen in 1828 and received a 2560-acre (1036 ha) grant in Durham County, New South Wales. After John established himself as a successful merchant he opened the Kent Brewery on Parramatta Road. In August 1843 Robert and Edwin arrived in Sydney on the Euphrates. The enduring merchant and brewing firm of R. and E. Tooth began on 1 September 1843 when John leased them the brewery.

== Business and public life ==
Frederick joined Sydney and the partnership about 1853 and R., E. and F. Tooth became R. and F. Tooth & Co. on 2 January 1860 when J. S. Mitchell became a partner. In 1852 with John Edye, James Alexander and (Sir) William Montagu Manning, Mort, J. Croft and Edwin, Robert formed the Twofold Bay Pastoral Association which acquired some 400,000 acres (161,876 ha) on the south coast and Monaro; Kameruka was the head station. Threatened by (Sir) John Robertson's land bills they bought as much land as possible in their own names and disbanded in 1860.

For 10 months from May 1856 he was an appointed member of the Legislative Council. A large squatter with about 600 employees, at the January 1858 election he stood for seat of Sydney Hamlets in the Legislative Assembly, advocating free selection of land at £1 an acre without auction, tramways instead of expensive railways to bring produce to market and an elective Upper House. He lost, but won a seat representing Sydney City two days later. Questionably claiming to have disposed of all his runs except one on the Queensland border and opposing Robertson's land bill, Robert stood for West Sydney in December 1860 but again was defeated.

Tooth then concentrated on his business interests. Their London house, R. & F. Tooth & Mort, 155 Fenchurch Street, acted also as agents for Smyth's Sydney Marine Assurance Office and the Peak Downs Copper Mining Co. He became a committee-man of the Society for the Suppression of Cattle Stealing in 1861 and of the Agricultural Society of New South Wales. He was a partner of Robert Cran, F. F. Nixon, (Sir) Robert Lucas Tooth and Frederick under the style of Tooth and Cran until March 1872 at Yengarie near Maryborough, Queensland, and in the Wide Bay and Burnett districts. From 1865 they experimented with meat preserving at Yengarie and in 1870 won a prize at the Intercolonial Exhibition, Sydney. In the mid-1860s Robert still nominally held the Lachlan and Wide Bay runs he had leased in the 1850s; he had added Jondaryan and Irvingdale, almost 300 sq. miles (777 km^{2}) on the Darling Downs and some twenty-eight runs, amounting to 700 sq. miles (1813 km^{2}), in the Maranoa District of Queensland. Tooth was also a director of the Bank of New South Wales in the 1850s and 1860s (president in 1862–63) and a director of the Colonial Sugar Refining Co. in 1855–63;

A prominent Anglican layman, he was a director of the Society for the Relief of Destitute Children, a fellow of St Paul's College within the University of Sydney and an original committee-man of the Union Club. He began building his fine residence, Cranbrook, at Rose Bay in 1859 but sold it to Robert Towns in 1864. Robert retired from R. and F. Tooth & Co. in April 1872 and Frederick and R. L. Tooth carried on as F. Tooth & Co. This partnership was dissolved on 31 March 1873 when Frederick retired, Mitchell and R. L. Tooth carrying on as Tooth & Co. Most of the profit from this successful business came from importing wines, spirits and beer, as colonial beer was not widely drunk until the 1880s.

On 1 May 1849 he had married at St Mark's Church, Pontville, Van Diemen's Land, Maria Lisle, daughter of Captain George Brooks Forster, R.N.; on 24 June 1871 he married Elizabeth Mansfield.

In 1880 he became the first President of the New South Wales Gun Club which was based at Mascot where the domestic airport is today. The club is still operational today based in Duffy Forest as it moved there in the 1940s to make way for the second runway at Mascott. The club shoot Clay Targets across all Olympic disciplines.

New South Wales Legislative Assembly
Preceded by Robert Campbell; Charles Cowper; James Wilshire; William Dalley	Member for Sydney City; 1858–1859; With: Robert Campbell; Charles Cowper; George Thornton	District abolished
