= Cowper ministry (1857–1859) =

Second Cowper ministry
- 4th Cabinet of the Colony of New South Wales

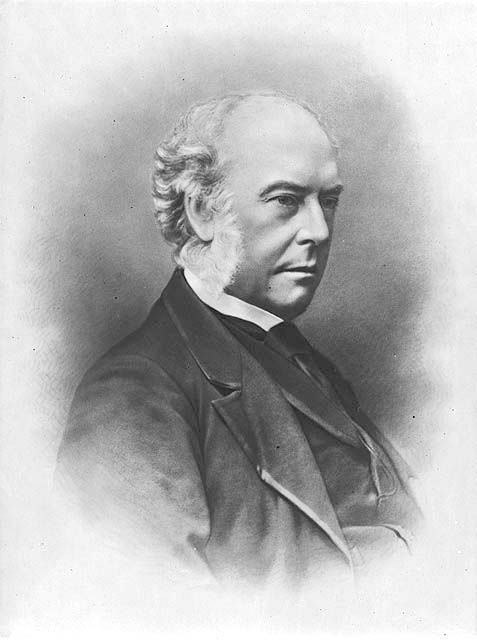
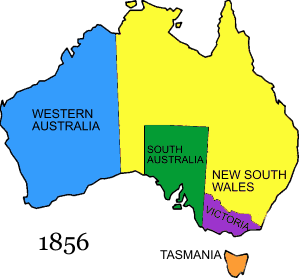
- Premier Charles Cowper and the Colony of New South Wales (1856–1859)
- Date formed: 7 September 1857
- Date dissolved: 26 October 1859

People and organisations
- Monarch: Queen Victoria
- Governor: William Denison
- Head of government: Charles Cowper
- No. of ministers: 6
- Member party: unaligned
- Status in legislature: Minority government
- Opposition party: unaligned
- Opposition leader: Henry Parker; William Forster

History
- Predecessor: Parker ministry
- Successor: Forster ministry

The second Cowper ministry was the fourth ministry of the Colony of New South Wales, and second occasion of being led by Charles Cowper.

Cowper was elected in the first free elections for the New South Wales Legislative Assembly held in March 1856, and fought unsuccessfully with Stuart Donaldson to form Government. When Donaldson's Government faltered a little over two months after it was formed, Cowper formed Government on the first occasion, but he also lost the confidence of the Assembly a few months later. Henry Parker formed Government, lasting a little under twelve months, until it lost an electoral bill, when Cowper was again asked to form Government.

The title of Premier was widely used to refer to the Leader of Government, but not enshrined in formal use until 1920.

There was no party system in New South Wales politics until 1887. Under the constitution, ministers were required to resign to recontest their seats in a by-election when appointed. On this occasion all 4 ministers appointed in September 1857 were re-elected unopposed. Robert Campbell and John Robertson were appointed in January 1858 however no by-elections were held as the Legislative Assembly had been dissolved for the general election which was held between 13 January and 12 February 1858. William Dalley was re-elected unopposed in November 1858. John Hargrave was not a member of parliament at the time he was appointed Solicitor General. Hargrave had resigned as a judge of the District Court and the member for East Camden, Robert Owen, was appointed to replace him. Hargrave won Owen's former seat at the by-election on 21 March 1859. Edward Flood was re-elected unopposed on his appointment in October 1859.

This ministry covers the period from 7 September 1857 until on 26 October 1859, when Cowper resigned his commission, having lost an educational bill. Cowper resigned from the Assembly on the next day. During the period of this ministry, there were many arrangements, with no fewer than 13 men holding the seven positions in its life of just over two years.

== Composition of ministry ==
Portfolio	Minister	Term start	Term end	Term length
Premier; Colonial Secretary	Charles Cowper	7 September 1857	26 October 1859	2 years, 49 days
Colonial Treasurer	Richard Jones	7 September 1857	3 January 1858	118 days
Colonial Treasurer	Robert Campbell	4 January 1858	30 March 1859	1 year, 85 days
Colonial Treasurer	Elias Weekes	18 April 1859	26 October 1859	191 days
Secretary for Lands and Works	Terence Murray	7 September 1857	12 January 1858	127 days
Secretary for Lands and Works	John Robertson	13 January 1858	30 September 1859	2 years, 49 days
Secretary for Lands	John Robertson	1 October 1859	26 October 1859	2 years, 49 days
Secretary for Public Works	Edward Flood	1 October 1859	26 October 1859	25 days
Attorney General	James Martin	7 September 1857	8 November 1858	1 year, 62 days
Attorney General	Alfred Lutwyche MLC	15 November 1858	21 February 1859	98 days
Attorney General	Lyttleton Bayley MLC / MLA	21 February 1859	26 October 1859	247 days
Solicitor General	Alfred Lutwyche MLC	7 September 1857	14 November 1858	1 year, 68 days
Solicitor General	William Dalley	15 November 1858	11 February 1859	88 days
Solicitor General	John Hargrave MLA / MLC	21 February 1859	26 October 1859	247 days
Representative of the Government in the Legislative Council	Lyttleton Bayley MLC	23 February 1859	28 April 1859	64 days
Representative of the Government in the Legislative Council	John Dickson MLC (Note: A member of the government without a seat in the Cabinet.)	30 August 1859	28 September 1859	219 days
Representative of the Government in the Legislative Council	John Hargrave MLC	12 October 1859	26 October 1859	14 days

Ministers are members of the Legislative Assembly unless otherwise noted.

== See also ==
- Self-government in New South Wales
- Members of the New South Wales Legislative Assembly, 1856–1858
- Members of the New South Wales Legislative Assembly, 1858–1859
- First Cowper ministry (1856)
- Third Cowper ministry (1861–1863)
- Fourth Cowper ministry (1865–1866)
- Fifth Cowper ministry (1870)

Preceded by Parker ministry	Second Cowper ministry 1857–1859	Succeeded by Forster ministry
