= December 1856 Sydney City colonial by-election =

By-election in New South Wales, Australia

A by-election was held for the New South Wales Legislative Assembly electorate of Sydney City ion 30 December 1856 because of the resignation of Henry Parkes due to financial difficulties with his newspaper The Empire.

== Dates ==
Date	Event
19 December 1856	Henry Parkes resigned.
22 December 1856	Writ of election issued by the Speaker of the Legislative Assembly.
29 December 1856	Nominations
30 December 1856	Polling day
6 January 1867	Return of writ

== Result ==
1856 Sydney City by-election Tuesday 30 December
Candidate	Votes	%
William Dalley (elected)	1,998	57.2
John Fairfax	1,493	42.8
Total formal votes	3,491	100.0
Informal votes	0	0
Turnout	3,491	25.2

== See also ==
- Electoral results for the district of Sydney City
- List of New South Wales state by-elections
