= Forster ministry =

New South Wales government ministry led by William Forster

- 5th Cabinet of the Colony of New South Wales

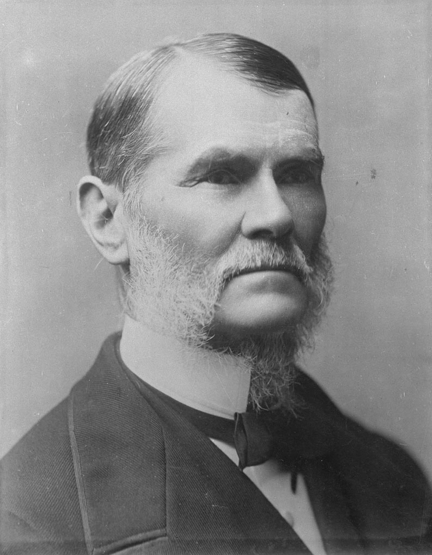
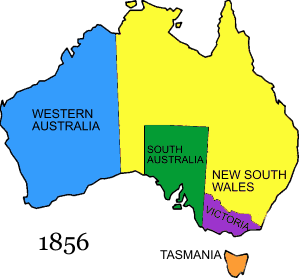
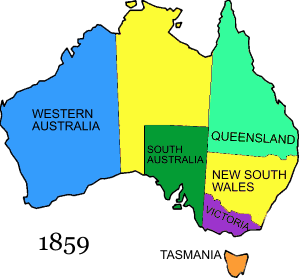
- Premier William Forster and the Colony of New South Wales (1856–1859)
- Date formed: 27 October 1859
- Date dissolved: 8 March 1860

People and organisations
- Monarch: Queen Victoria
- Governor: William Denison
- Head of government: William Forster
- No. of ministers: 6
- Member party: unaligned
- Status in legislature: Minority government
- Opposition party: unaligned
- Opposition leader: Charles Cowper; John Robertson

History
- Predecessor: Second Cowper ministry
- Successor: First Robertson ministry

The Forster ministry was the fifth ministry of the Colony of New South Wales, and was led by William Forster. Forster was elected in the first free elections for the New South Wales Legislative Assembly held in March 1856. He was asked to form Government after the second Cowper ministry lost an educational bill in the Assembly.

The title of Premier was widely used to refer to the Leader of Government, but not enshrined in formal use until 1920.

There was no party system in New South Wales politics until 1887. Under the constitution, ministers were required to resign to recontest their seats in a by-election when appointed. Such ministerial by-elections were usually uncontested and on this occasion William Forster (Queanbeyan) and Saul Samuel (Orange) were re-elected unopposed, while John Black was comfortably re-elected at the East Sydney by-election.

This ministry covers the period of just four months from 27 October 1859 until 8 March 1860, when Forster resigned his commission.

== Composition of ministry ==
Portfolio	Minister	Term start	Term end	Term length
Premier; Colonial Secretary	William Forster	27 October 1859	8 March 1860	133 days
Colonial Treasurer	Saul Samuel	27 October 1859	8 March 1860	133 days
Secretary for Lands	John Black	27 October 1859	8 March 1860	133 days
Secretary for Public Works; Representative of the Government in the Legislative Council	Geoffrey Eagar MLC	27 October 1859	8 March 1860	133 days
Attorney General	Edward Wise MLC (Note: Edward Wise resigned his commission and from parliament in 1860 and was appointed a judge of the Supreme Court.)	27 October 1859	13 February 1860	109 days
Attorney General	Sir William Manning (Note: Sir William Manning had previously been a member of the Legislative Assembly and was subsequently appointed to the Legislative Council, but was not a member of parliament at the time of this appointment.)	21 February 1860	8 March 1860	16 days
Solicitor General	John Hargrave MLC	3 November 1859 (Note: John Hargrave had been Solicitor General since 21 February 1859 in the second Cowper ministry.)	8 March 1860	126 days

Ministers are members of the Legislative Assembly unless otherwise noted.

== See also ==
- Self-government in New South Wales
- Members of the New South Wales Legislative Assembly, 1859–1860

Preceded by Second Cowper ministry	Forster ministry 1859–1860	Succeeded by First Robertson ministry
