= Cowper ministry (1856) =

First New South Wales government ministry led by Charles Cowper

First Cowper ministry
- 2nd Cabinet of the Colony of New South Wales

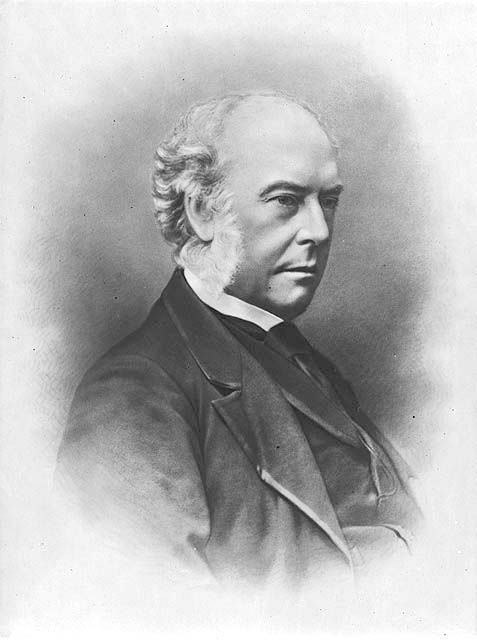
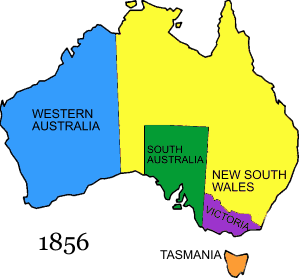
- Premier Charles Cowper and the Colony of New South Wales (1856–1859)
- Date formed: 25 August 1856
- Date dissolved: 2 October 1856

People and organisations
- Monarch: Queen Victoria
- Governor: William Denison
- Head of government: Charles Cowper
- No. of ministers: 6
- Member party: unaligned
- Status in legislature: Minority government
- Opposition party: unaligned
- Opposition leader: Stuart Donaldson; Henry Parker

History
- Predecessor: Donaldson ministry
- Successor: Parker ministry

The first Cowper ministry was the second ministry of the Colony of New South Wales, and was led by Charles Cowper. It was the first of five occasions that Cowper was Leader of the Government. Cowper was elected in the first free elections for the New South Wales Legislative Assembly held in March 1856, and fought unsuccessfully with Stuart Donaldson to form Government. When Donaldson's Government faltered a little over two months after it was formed, Cowper formed Government.

The title of Premier was widely used to refer to the Leader of Government, but not enshrined in formal use until 1920.

There was no party system in New South Wales politics until 1887. Under the constitution, ministers were required to resign to recontest their seats in a by-election when appointed. Charles Cowper and Robert Campbell were comfortably re-elected in the by election for Sydney City. James Martin (Cook and Westmoreland) and Terence Murray (Southern Boroughs) were re-elected unopposed.

This ministry covers the period from 26 August 1856 until on 2 October 1856, when Cowper resigned his commission, having lost the confidence of the Assembly.

== Composition of ministry ==
Portfolio	Minister	Term start	Term end	Term length
Premier; Colonial Secretary	Charles Cowper	26 August 1856	2 October 1856	37 days
Colonial Treasurer	Robert Campbell	26 August 1856	2 October 1856	37 days
Attorney General	James Martin	26 August 1856	2 October 1856	37 days
Solicitor General; Representative of the Government in the Legislative Council	Alfred Lutwyche MLC	26 August 1856	2 October 1856	37 days
Secretary for Lands and Works	Terence Murray	26 August 1856	2 October 1856	37 days
Auditor-General	Terence Murray	26 August 1856	17 September 1856	23 days

Ministers are members of the Legislative Assembly unless otherwise noted.

== See also ==
- Self-government in New South Wales
- Members of the New South Wales Legislative Assembly, 1856–1858
- Second Cowper ministry (1857–1859)
- Third Cowper ministry (1861–1863)
- Fourth Cowper ministry (1865–1866)
- Fifth Cowper ministry (1870)

Preceded by Donaldson ministry	First Cowper ministry 1856	Succeeded by Parker ministry
