= Cowper ministry (1870) =

Fifth New South Wales government ministry led by Charles Cowper

Fifth Cowper ministry
- 12th Cabinet of the Colony of New South Wales

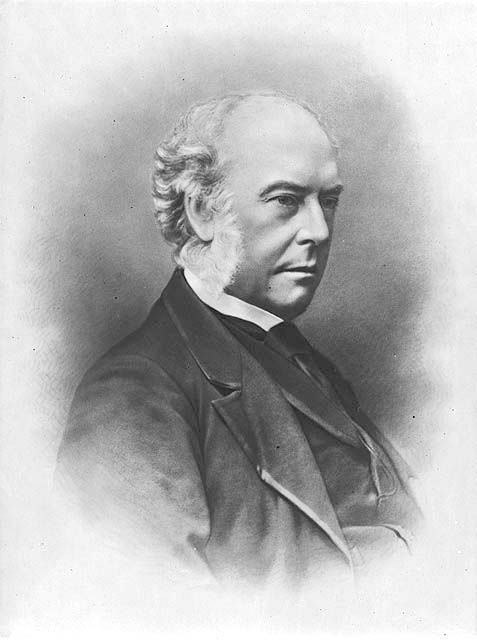
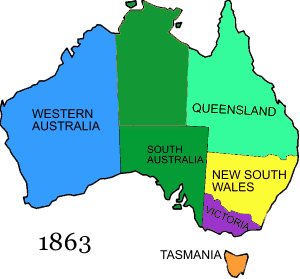
- Premier Charles Cowper and the Colony of New South Wales (1863–1900)
- Date formed: 13 January 1870
- Date dissolved: 15 December 1870

People and organisations
- Monarch: Queen Victoria
- Governor: The Earl Belmore
- Head of government: Charles Cowper
- No. of ministers: 8
- Member party: unaligned
- Status in legislature: Minority government
- Opposition party: unaligned
- Opposition leader: John Robertson; James Martin

History
- Predecessor: Second Robertson ministry
- Successor: Third Martin ministry

The fifth Cowper ministry was the twelfth ministry of the Colony of New South Wales, and the fifth and final occasion of being led by Sir Charles Cowper.

Cowper was elected in the first free elections for the New South Wales Legislative Assembly held in March 1856, and fought unsuccessfully with Stuart Donaldson to form Government. When Donaldson's Government faltered a little over two months after it was formed, Cowper formed Government on the first occasion, but he also lost the confidence of the Assembly a few months later. Cowper formed Government on the second occasion between 1857 and 1859; but it also lost the confidence of the Assembly. On the third occasion, Cowper formed Government following the decision by the Leader of the Government, John Robertson, to step aside and focus on land reform, however Cowper then lost confidence to James Martin. Cowper retained government on the fourth occasion by defeating Martin at the 1864–65 general election. Following the resignation of his colleague, Robertson, who lost the confidence of the Assembly, Cowper became Premier on the fifth and final occasion in 1870.

The title of Premier was widely used to refer to the Leader of Government, but not enshrined in formal use until 1920.

There was no party system in New South Wales politics until 1887. Under the constitution, ministers were required to resign to recontest their seats in a by-election when appointed. Because the majority of the ministers retained their appointments from the Robertson ministry, the only by-election that was initially required was for Liverpool Plains with Charles Cowper comfortably re-elected. When John Robertson was subsequently appointed Secretary for Lands, he was re-elected unopposed.

This ministry covers the period from 13 January 1870 until 15 December 1870, when Martin was asked to form government after Cowper again lost the confidence of the Assembly.

== Composition of ministry ==
Portfolio	Minister	Term start	Term end	Term length
Premier; Colonial Secretary	Sir Charles Cowper	13 January 1870	15 December 1870	336 days
Colonial Treasurer	Saul Samuel (Note: Continued in role from Second Robertson ministry.)	13 January 1870	15 December 1870	336 days
Secretary for Lands	William Forster	13 January 1870	14 April 1870	91 days
Secretary for Lands	John Robertson	13 August 1870	15 December 1870	124 days
Secretary for Public Works	John Sutherland	13 January 1870	15 December 1870	336 days
Attorney General	Sir William Manning MLC (Note: A member of the government without a seat in the Cabinet.)	13 January 1870	15 December 1870	336 days
Solicitor General	Julian Salomons MLC (Note: Julian Salomons was not appointed to the Legislative Council until 11 August 1870, 7 months after his appointment as Solicitor General.)	13 January 1870	15 December 1870	336 days
Postmaster-General	Daniel Egan	13 January 1870	15 December 1870	336 days
Representative of the Government in the Legislative Council	Robert Owen MLC (Note: A member of the government with a seat in the Cabinet.)	13 January 1870	1 August 1870	200 days
Representative of the Government in the Legislative Council	Julian Salomons MLC	11 August 1870	15 December 1870	126 days days

Ministers are members of the Legislative Assembly unless otherwise noted.

== See also ==
- Self-government in New South Wales
- Members of the New South Wales Legislative Assembly, 1869–1872
- First Cowper ministry (1856)
- Second Cowper ministry (1857–1859)
- Third Cowper ministry (1861–1863)
- Fourth Cowper ministry (1865–1866)

Preceded by Second Robertson ministry	Fifth Cowper ministry 1870	Succeeded by Third Martin ministry
