= Premier of New South Wales =

Head of government of New South Wales

- Coat of arms of New South Wales

- Flag of New South Wales

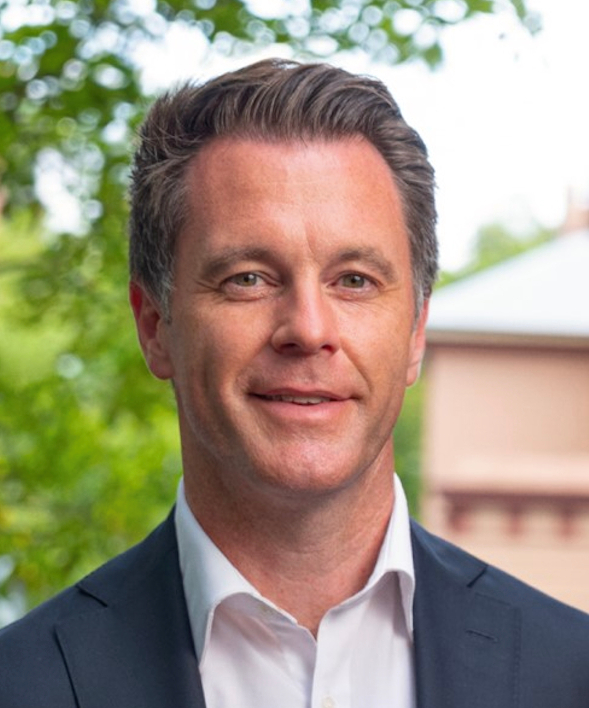
- Incumbent; Chris Minns since 28 March 2023
- Premier's Department; Cabinet Office
- Style: The Honourable (formal); Premier (informal)
- Status: Head of government
- Member of: New South Wales Legislative Assembly
- Reports to: Parliament
- Appointer: Governor of New South Wales by convention, based on appointee's ability to command confidence in the Legislative Assembly
- Term length: At the governor's pleasure contingent on the premier's ability to command confidence in the lower house of Parliament
- Constituting instrument: None (constitutional convention)
- Formation: 6 June 1856
- First holder: Stuart Donaldson
- Deputy: Deputy Premier of New South Wales
- Salary: $416,440

The premier of New South Wales is the head of government in the state of New South Wales, Australia. The Government of New South Wales follows the Westminster Parliamentary System, with the Parliament of New South Wales acting as the legislature. The premier is appointed by the Governor of New South Wales, and by modern convention holds office by their ability to command the support of a majority of members of the lower house of Parliament, the Legislative Assembly.

Before Federation in 1901, the term "prime minister of New South Wales" was also used. "Premier" has been used more or less exclusively from 1901, to avoid confusion with the federal prime minister of Australia.

The current premier is Chris Minns, the leader of the New South Wales Labor Party, who assumed office on 28 March 2023. Minns defeated Dominic Perrottet at the election held on 25 March 2023, after twelve years of Liberal/National Coalition rule.

== List of premiers of New South Wales ==
No.	Portrait	Name Electoral district (Birth–death)	Election	Term of office			Political party	Ministry	Monarch
No.	Portrait	Name Electoral district (Birth–death)	Election	Term start	Term end	Time in office	Political party	Ministry	Monarch
1		Stuart Donaldson; MLA for Sydney Hamlets (1812–1867)	1856	6 June 1856	25 August 1856	80 days	Independent	Donaldson	Victoria (1837–1901); Governor: Sir William Denison (1855–1861); Sir John Young (1861–1867); Somerset Lowry-Corry, 4th Earl Belmore (1868–1872); Sir Hercules Robinson (1872–1879); Lord Augustus Loftus (1879–1885); Charles Wynn-Carrington, 3rd Baron Carrington (1885–1890); Victor Child Villiers, 7th Earl of Jersey (1891–1893); Sir Robert Duff (1893–1895); Henry Brand, 2nd Viscount Hampden (1895–1899); William Lygon, 7th Earl Beauchamp (from 1899)
2		Charles Cowper; MLA for Sydney City (1807–1875)	—	26 August 1856	2 October 1856	37 days	Independent	Cowper I	Victoria (1837–1901); Governor: Sir William Denison (1855–1861); Sir John Young (1861–1867); Somerset Lowry-Corry, 4th Earl Belmore (1868–1872); Sir Hercules Robinson (1872–1879); Lord Augustus Loftus (1879–1885); Charles Wynn-Carrington, 3rd Baron Carrington (1885–1890); Victor Child Villiers, 7th Earl of Jersey (1891–1893); Sir Robert Duff (1893–1895); Henry Brand, 2nd Viscount Hampden (1895–1899); William Lygon, 7th Earl Beauchamp (from 1899)
3		Henry Parker; MLA for Parramatta (1808–1881)	—	3 October 1856	7 September 1857	339 days	Independent	Parker	Victoria (1837–1901); Governor: Sir William Denison (1855–1861); Sir John Young (1861–1867); Somerset Lowry-Corry, 4th Earl Belmore (1868–1872); Sir Hercules Robinson (1872–1879); Lord Augustus Loftus (1879–1885); Charles Wynn-Carrington, 3rd Baron Carrington (1885–1890); Victor Child Villiers, 7th Earl of Jersey (1891–1893); Sir Robert Duff (1893–1895); Henry Brand, 2nd Viscount Hampden (1895–1899); William Lygon, 7th Earl Beauchamp (from 1899)
(2)		Charles Cowper; MLA for Sydney City (until 1859); MLA for East Sydney (from 1859) (1807–1875)	—	7 September 1857	26 October 1859	2 years, 49 days	Independent	Cowper II	Victoria (1837–1901); Governor: Sir William Denison (1855–1861); Sir John Young (1861–1867); Somerset Lowry-Corry, 4th Earl Belmore (1868–1872); Sir Hercules Robinson (1872–1879); Lord Augustus Loftus (1879–1885); Charles Wynn-Carrington, 3rd Baron Carrington (1885–1890); Victor Child Villiers, 7th Earl of Jersey (1891–1893); Sir Robert Duff (1893–1895); Henry Brand, 2nd Viscount Hampden (1895–1899); William Lygon, 7th Earl Beauchamp (from 1899)
(2)		Charles Cowper; MLA for Sydney City (until 1859); MLA for East Sydney (from 1859) (1807–1875)	1858	7 September 1857	26 October 1859	2 years, 49 days	Independent	Cowper II	Victoria (1837–1901); Governor: Sir William Denison (1855–1861); Sir John Young (1861–1867); Somerset Lowry-Corry, 4th Earl Belmore (1868–1872); Sir Hercules Robinson (1872–1879); Lord Augustus Loftus (1879–1885); Charles Wynn-Carrington, 3rd Baron Carrington (1885–1890); Victor Child Villiers, 7th Earl of Jersey (1891–1893); Sir Robert Duff (1893–1895); Henry Brand, 2nd Viscount Hampden (1895–1899); William Lygon, 7th Earl Beauchamp (from 1899)
(2)		Charles Cowper; MLA for Sydney City (until 1859); MLA for East Sydney (from 1859) (1807–1875)	1859	7 September 1857	26 October 1859	2 years, 49 days	Independent	Cowper II	Victoria (1837–1901); Governor: Sir William Denison (1855–1861); Sir John Young (1861–1867); Somerset Lowry-Corry, 4th Earl Belmore (1868–1872); Sir Hercules Robinson (1872–1879); Lord Augustus Loftus (1879–1885); Charles Wynn-Carrington, 3rd Baron Carrington (1885–1890); Victor Child Villiers, 7th Earl of Jersey (1891–1893); Sir Robert Duff (1893–1895); Henry Brand, 2nd Viscount Hampden (1895–1899); William Lygon, 7th Earl Beauchamp (from 1899)
4		William Forster; MLA for Queanbeyan (1818–1882)	—	27 October 1859	9 March 1860	1 year, 165 days	Independent	Forster	Victoria (1837–1901); Governor: Sir William Denison (1855–1861); Sir John Young (1861–1867); Somerset Lowry-Corry, 4th Earl Belmore (1868–1872); Sir Hercules Robinson (1872–1879); Lord Augustus Loftus (1879–1885); Charles Wynn-Carrington, 3rd Baron Carrington (1885–1890); Victor Child Villiers, 7th Earl of Jersey (1891–1893); Sir Robert Duff (1893–1895); Henry Brand, 2nd Viscount Hampden (1895–1899); William Lygon, 7th Earl Beauchamp (from 1899)
5		John Robertson; MLA for Upper Hunter (1816–1891)	—	9 March 1860	9 January 1861	306 days	Independent	Robertson I	Victoria (1837–1901); Governor: Sir William Denison (1855–1861); Sir John Young (1861–1867); Somerset Lowry-Corry, 4th Earl Belmore (1868–1872); Sir Hercules Robinson (1872–1879); Lord Augustus Loftus (1879–1885); Charles Wynn-Carrington, 3rd Baron Carrington (1885–1890); Victor Child Villiers, 7th Earl of Jersey (1891–1893); Sir Robert Duff (1893–1895); Henry Brand, 2nd Viscount Hampden (1895–1899); William Lygon, 7th Earl Beauchamp (from 1899)
(2)		Charles Cowper; MLA for East Sydney (1807–1875)	1860	10 January 1861	15 October 1863	2 years, 278 days	Independent	Cowper III	Victoria (1837–1901); Governor: Sir William Denison (1855–1861); Sir John Young (1861–1867); Somerset Lowry-Corry, 4th Earl Belmore (1868–1872); Sir Hercules Robinson (1872–1879); Lord Augustus Loftus (1879–1885); Charles Wynn-Carrington, 3rd Baron Carrington (1885–1890); Victor Child Villiers, 7th Earl of Jersey (1891–1893); Sir Robert Duff (1893–1895); Henry Brand, 2nd Viscount Hampden (1895–1899); William Lygon, 7th Earl Beauchamp (from 1899)
6		James Martin; MLA for Tumut (until 1864); MLA for Monara (1864); MLA for Lachlan (from 1864) (1820–1886)	—	16 October 1863	2 February 1865	1 year, 109 days	Independent	Martin I	Victoria (1837–1901); Governor: Sir William Denison (1855–1861); Sir John Young (1861–1867); Somerset Lowry-Corry, 4th Earl Belmore (1868–1872); Sir Hercules Robinson (1872–1879); Lord Augustus Loftus (1879–1885); Charles Wynn-Carrington, 3rd Baron Carrington (1885–1890); Victor Child Villiers, 7th Earl of Jersey (1891–1893); Sir Robert Duff (1893–1895); Henry Brand, 2nd Viscount Hampden (1895–1899); William Lygon, 7th Earl Beauchamp (from 1899)
(2)		Charles Cowper; MLA for East Sydney (1807–1875)	1864–65	3 February 1865	21 January 1866	352 days	Independent	Cowper IV	Victoria (1837–1901); Governor: Sir William Denison (1855–1861); Sir John Young (1861–1867); Somerset Lowry-Corry, 4th Earl Belmore (1868–1872); Sir Hercules Robinson (1872–1879); Lord Augustus Loftus (1879–1885); Charles Wynn-Carrington, 3rd Baron Carrington (1885–1890); Victor Child Villiers, 7th Earl of Jersey (1891–1893); Sir Robert Duff (1893–1895); Henry Brand, 2nd Viscount Hampden (1895–1899); William Lygon, 7th Earl Beauchamp (from 1899)
(6)		James Martin; MLA for Lachlan (1820–1886)	—	22 January 1866	26 October 1868	2 years, 278 days	Independent	Martin II	Victoria (1837–1901); Governor: Sir William Denison (1855–1861); Sir John Young (1861–1867); Somerset Lowry-Corry, 4th Earl Belmore (1868–1872); Sir Hercules Robinson (1872–1879); Lord Augustus Loftus (1879–1885); Charles Wynn-Carrington, 3rd Baron Carrington (1885–1890); Victor Child Villiers, 7th Earl of Jersey (1891–1893); Sir Robert Duff (1893–1895); Henry Brand, 2nd Viscount Hampden (1895–1899); William Lygon, 7th Earl Beauchamp (from 1899)
(5)		John Robertson; MLA for Clarence (1816–1891)	—	27 October 1868	12 January 1870	1 year, 77 days	Independent	Robertson II	Victoria (1837–1901); Governor: Sir William Denison (1855–1861); Sir John Young (1861–1867); Somerset Lowry-Corry, 4th Earl Belmore (1868–1872); Sir Hercules Robinson (1872–1879); Lord Augustus Loftus (1879–1885); Charles Wynn-Carrington, 3rd Baron Carrington (1885–1890); Victor Child Villiers, 7th Earl of Jersey (1891–1893); Sir Robert Duff (1893–1895); Henry Brand, 2nd Viscount Hampden (1895–1899); William Lygon, 7th Earl Beauchamp (from 1899)
(2)		Charles Cowper; MLA for Liverpool Plains (1807–1875)	1869–70	13 January 1870	15 December 1870	336 days	Independent	Cowper V	Victoria (1837–1901); Governor: Sir William Denison (1855–1861); Sir John Young (1861–1867); Somerset Lowry-Corry, 4th Earl Belmore (1868–1872); Sir Hercules Robinson (1872–1879); Lord Augustus Loftus (1879–1885); Charles Wynn-Carrington, 3rd Baron Carrington (1885–1890); Victor Child Villiers, 7th Earl of Jersey (1891–1893); Sir Robert Duff (1893–1895); Henry Brand, 2nd Viscount Hampden (1895–1899); William Lygon, 7th Earl Beauchamp (from 1899)
(6)		James Martin; MLA for East Sydney (until 1872); MLA for East Macquarie (from 1872) (1820–1886)	—	16 December 1870	13 May 1872	1 year, 149 days	Independent	Martin III	Victoria (1837–1901); Governor: Sir William Denison (1855–1861); Sir John Young (1861–1867); Somerset Lowry-Corry, 4th Earl Belmore (1868–1872); Sir Hercules Robinson (1872–1879); Lord Augustus Loftus (1879–1885); Charles Wynn-Carrington, 3rd Baron Carrington (1885–1890); Victor Child Villiers, 7th Earl of Jersey (1891–1893); Sir Robert Duff (1893–1895); Henry Brand, 2nd Viscount Hampden (1895–1899); William Lygon, 7th Earl Beauchamp (from 1899)
7		Henry Parkes; MLA for East Sydney (1815–1896)	1872	14 May 1872	8 February 1875	2 years, 270 days	Independent	Parkes I	Victoria (1837–1901); Governor: Sir William Denison (1855–1861); Sir John Young (1861–1867); Somerset Lowry-Corry, 4th Earl Belmore (1868–1872); Sir Hercules Robinson (1872–1879); Lord Augustus Loftus (1879–1885); Charles Wynn-Carrington, 3rd Baron Carrington (1885–1890); Victor Child Villiers, 7th Earl of Jersey (1891–1893); Sir Robert Duff (1893–1895); Henry Brand, 2nd Viscount Hampden (1895–1899); William Lygon, 7th Earl Beauchamp (from 1899)
(5)		John Robertson; MLA for West Sydney (1816–1891)	1874–75	9 February 1875	21 March 1877	2 years, 40 days	Independent	Robertson III	Victoria (1837–1901); Governor: Sir William Denison (1855–1861); Sir John Young (1861–1867); Somerset Lowry-Corry, 4th Earl Belmore (1868–1872); Sir Hercules Robinson (1872–1879); Lord Augustus Loftus (1879–1885); Charles Wynn-Carrington, 3rd Baron Carrington (1885–1890); Victor Child Villiers, 7th Earl of Jersey (1891–1893); Sir Robert Duff (1893–1895); Henry Brand, 2nd Viscount Hampden (1895–1899); William Lygon, 7th Earl Beauchamp (from 1899)
(7)		Henry Parkes; MLA for East Sydney (1815–1896)	—	22 March 1877	16 August 1877	175 days	Independent	Parkes II	Victoria (1837–1901); Governor: Sir William Denison (1855–1861); Sir John Young (1861–1867); Somerset Lowry-Corry, 4th Earl Belmore (1868–1872); Sir Hercules Robinson (1872–1879); Lord Augustus Loftus (1879–1885); Charles Wynn-Carrington, 3rd Baron Carrington (1885–1890); Victor Child Villiers, 7th Earl of Jersey (1891–1893); Sir Robert Duff (1893–1895); Henry Brand, 2nd Viscount Hampden (1895–1899); William Lygon, 7th Earl Beauchamp (from 1899)
(5)		Sir John Robertson; MLA for West Sydney (until November 1877); MLA for East Macquarie (from November 1877); MLA for Lachlan (from November 1877) (1816–1891)	—	17 August 1877	17 December 1877	122 days	Independent	Robertson IV	Victoria (1837–1901); Governor: Sir William Denison (1855–1861); Sir John Young (1861–1867); Somerset Lowry-Corry, 4th Earl Belmore (1868–1872); Sir Hercules Robinson (1872–1879); Lord Augustus Loftus (1879–1885); Charles Wynn-Carrington, 3rd Baron Carrington (1885–1890); Victor Child Villiers, 7th Earl of Jersey (1891–1893); Sir Robert Duff (1893–1895); Henry Brand, 2nd Viscount Hampden (1895–1899); William Lygon, 7th Earl Beauchamp (from 1899)
8		James Farnell; MLA for St Leonards (1825–1888)	1877	18 December 1877	20 December 1878	1 year, 2 days	Independent	Farnell	Victoria (1837–1901); Governor: Sir William Denison (1855–1861); Sir John Young (1861–1867); Somerset Lowry-Corry, 4th Earl Belmore (1868–1872); Sir Hercules Robinson (1872–1879); Lord Augustus Loftus (1879–1885); Charles Wynn-Carrington, 3rd Baron Carrington (1885–1890); Victor Child Villiers, 7th Earl of Jersey (1891–1893); Sir Robert Duff (1893–1895); Henry Brand, 2nd Viscount Hampden (1895–1899); William Lygon, 7th Earl Beauchamp (from 1899)
(7)		Sir Henry Parkes; MLA for Canterbury (until 1880); MLA for East Sydney (1880–1882); MLA for Tenterfield (from 1882) (1815–1896)	—	21 December 1878	4 January 1883	4 years, 14 days	Independent	Parkes III	Victoria (1837–1901); Governor: Sir William Denison (1855–1861); Sir John Young (1861–1867); Somerset Lowry-Corry, 4th Earl Belmore (1868–1872); Sir Hercules Robinson (1872–1879); Lord Augustus Loftus (1879–1885); Charles Wynn-Carrington, 3rd Baron Carrington (1885–1890); Victor Child Villiers, 7th Earl of Jersey (1891–1893); Sir Robert Duff (1893–1895); Henry Brand, 2nd Viscount Hampden (1895–1899); William Lygon, 7th Earl Beauchamp (from 1899)
(7)		Sir Henry Parkes; MLA for Canterbury (until 1880); MLA for East Sydney (1880–1882); MLA for Tenterfield (from 1882) (1815–1896)	1880	21 December 1878	4 January 1883	4 years, 14 days	Independent	Parkes III	Victoria (1837–1901); Governor: Sir William Denison (1855–1861); Sir John Young (1861–1867); Somerset Lowry-Corry, 4th Earl Belmore (1868–1872); Sir Hercules Robinson (1872–1879); Lord Augustus Loftus (1879–1885); Charles Wynn-Carrington, 3rd Baron Carrington (1885–1890); Victor Child Villiers, 7th Earl of Jersey (1891–1893); Sir Robert Duff (1893–1895); Henry Brand, 2nd Viscount Hampden (1895–1899); William Lygon, 7th Earl Beauchamp (from 1899)
9		Alexander Stuart; MLA for Illawarra (1824–1886)	1882	5 January 1883	6 October 1885	2 years, 274 days	Independent	Stuart	Victoria (1837–1901); Governor: Sir William Denison (1855–1861); Sir John Young (1861–1867); Somerset Lowry-Corry, 4th Earl Belmore (1868–1872); Sir Hercules Robinson (1872–1879); Lord Augustus Loftus (1879–1885); Charles Wynn-Carrington, 3rd Baron Carrington (1885–1890); Victor Child Villiers, 7th Earl of Jersey (1891–1893); Sir Robert Duff (1893–1895); Henry Brand, 2nd Viscount Hampden (1895–1899); William Lygon, 7th Earl Beauchamp (from 1899)
10		George Dibbs; MLA for St Leonards (until October 1885); MLA for Murrumbidgee (from October 1885) (1834–1904)	—	7 October 1885	21 December 1885	75 days	Independent	Dibbs I	Victoria (1837–1901); Governor: Sir William Denison (1855–1861); Sir John Young (1861–1867); Somerset Lowry-Corry, 4th Earl Belmore (1868–1872); Sir Hercules Robinson (1872–1879); Lord Augustus Loftus (1879–1885); Charles Wynn-Carrington, 3rd Baron Carrington (1885–1890); Victor Child Villiers, 7th Earl of Jersey (1891–1893); Sir Robert Duff (1893–1895); Henry Brand, 2nd Viscount Hampden (1895–1899); William Lygon, 7th Earl Beauchamp (from 1899)
10		George Dibbs; MLA for St Leonards (until October 1885); MLA for Murrumbidgee (from October 1885) (1834–1904)	1885	7 October 1885	21 December 1885	75 days	Independent	Dibbs I	Victoria (1837–1901); Governor: Sir William Denison (1855–1861); Sir John Young (1861–1867); Somerset Lowry-Corry, 4th Earl Belmore (1868–1872); Sir Hercules Robinson (1872–1879); Lord Augustus Loftus (1879–1885); Charles Wynn-Carrington, 3rd Baron Carrington (1885–1890); Victor Child Villiers, 7th Earl of Jersey (1891–1893); Sir Robert Duff (1893–1895); Henry Brand, 2nd Viscount Hampden (1895–1899); William Lygon, 7th Earl Beauchamp (from 1899)
(5)		Sir John Robertson; MLA for Mudgee (1816–1891)	—	22 December 1885	22 February 1886	62 days	Independent	Robertson V	Victoria (1837–1901); Governor: Sir William Denison (1855–1861); Sir John Young (1861–1867); Somerset Lowry-Corry, 4th Earl Belmore (1868–1872); Sir Hercules Robinson (1872–1879); Lord Augustus Loftus (1879–1885); Charles Wynn-Carrington, 3rd Baron Carrington (1885–1890); Victor Child Villiers, 7th Earl of Jersey (1891–1893); Sir Robert Duff (1893–1895); Henry Brand, 2nd Viscount Hampden (1895–1899); William Lygon, 7th Earl Beauchamp (from 1899)
11		Sir Patrick Jennings; MLA for The Bogan (1831–1897)	—	26 February 1886	19 January 1887	327 days	Independent	Jennings	Victoria (1837–1901); Governor: Sir William Denison (1855–1861); Sir John Young (1861–1867); Somerset Lowry-Corry, 4th Earl Belmore (1868–1872); Sir Hercules Robinson (1872–1879); Lord Augustus Loftus (1879–1885); Charles Wynn-Carrington, 3rd Baron Carrington (1885–1890); Victor Child Villiers, 7th Earl of Jersey (1891–1893); Sir Robert Duff (1893–1895); Henry Brand, 2nd Viscount Hampden (1895–1899); William Lygon, 7th Earl Beauchamp (from 1899)
(7)		Sir Henry Parkes; MLA for St Leonards (1815–1896)	—	25 January 1887	16 January 1889	1 year, 357 days	Free Trade	Parkes IV	Victoria (1837–1901); Governor: Sir William Denison (1855–1861); Sir John Young (1861–1867); Somerset Lowry-Corry, 4th Earl Belmore (1868–1872); Sir Hercules Robinson (1872–1879); Lord Augustus Loftus (1879–1885); Charles Wynn-Carrington, 3rd Baron Carrington (1885–1890); Victor Child Villiers, 7th Earl of Jersey (1891–1893); Sir Robert Duff (1893–1895); Henry Brand, 2nd Viscount Hampden (1895–1899); William Lygon, 7th Earl Beauchamp (from 1899)
(7)		Sir Henry Parkes; MLA for St Leonards (1815–1896)	1887	25 January 1887	16 January 1889	1 year, 357 days	Free Trade	Parkes IV	Victoria (1837–1901); Governor: Sir William Denison (1855–1861); Sir John Young (1861–1867); Somerset Lowry-Corry, 4th Earl Belmore (1868–1872); Sir Hercules Robinson (1872–1879); Lord Augustus Loftus (1879–1885); Charles Wynn-Carrington, 3rd Baron Carrington (1885–1890); Victor Child Villiers, 7th Earl of Jersey (1891–1893); Sir Robert Duff (1893–1895); Henry Brand, 2nd Viscount Hampden (1895–1899); William Lygon, 7th Earl Beauchamp (from 1899)
10		George Dibbs; MLA for Murrumbidgee (1834–1904)	—	17 January 1889	7 March 1889	49 days	Protectionist	Dibbs II	Victoria (1837–1901); Governor: Sir William Denison (1855–1861); Sir John Young (1861–1867); Somerset Lowry-Corry, 4th Earl Belmore (1868–1872); Sir Hercules Robinson (1872–1879); Lord Augustus Loftus (1879–1885); Charles Wynn-Carrington, 3rd Baron Carrington (1885–1890); Victor Child Villiers, 7th Earl of Jersey (1891–1893); Sir Robert Duff (1893–1895); Henry Brand, 2nd Viscount Hampden (1895–1899); William Lygon, 7th Earl Beauchamp (from 1899)
(7)		Sir Henry Parkes; MLA for St Leonards (1815–1896)	1889	8 March 1889	23 October 1891	2 years, 229 days	Free Trade	Parkes V	Victoria (1837–1901); Governor: Sir William Denison (1855–1861); Sir John Young (1861–1867); Somerset Lowry-Corry, 4th Earl Belmore (1868–1872); Sir Hercules Robinson (1872–1879); Lord Augustus Loftus (1879–1885); Charles Wynn-Carrington, 3rd Baron Carrington (1885–1890); Victor Child Villiers, 7th Earl of Jersey (1891–1893); Sir Robert Duff (1893–1895); Henry Brand, 2nd Viscount Hampden (1895–1899); William Lygon, 7th Earl Beauchamp (from 1899)
(7)		Sir Henry Parkes; MLA for St Leonards (1815–1896)	1891	8 March 1889	23 October 1891	2 years, 229 days	Free Trade	Parkes V	Victoria (1837–1901); Governor: Sir William Denison (1855–1861); Sir John Young (1861–1867); Somerset Lowry-Corry, 4th Earl Belmore (1868–1872); Sir Hercules Robinson (1872–1879); Lord Augustus Loftus (1879–1885); Charles Wynn-Carrington, 3rd Baron Carrington (1885–1890); Victor Child Villiers, 7th Earl of Jersey (1891–1893); Sir Robert Duff (1893–1895); Henry Brand, 2nd Viscount Hampden (1895–1899); William Lygon, 7th Earl Beauchamp (from 1899)
(10)		George Dibbs; MLA for Murrumbidgee (1834–1904)	—	23 October 1891	2 August 1894	2 years, 283 days	Protectionist	Dibbs III	Victoria (1837–1901); Governor: Sir William Denison (1855–1861); Sir John Young (1861–1867); Somerset Lowry-Corry, 4th Earl Belmore (1868–1872); Sir Hercules Robinson (1872–1879); Lord Augustus Loftus (1879–1885); Charles Wynn-Carrington, 3rd Baron Carrington (1885–1890); Victor Child Villiers, 7th Earl of Jersey (1891–1893); Sir Robert Duff (1893–1895); Henry Brand, 2nd Viscount Hampden (1895–1899); William Lygon, 7th Earl Beauchamp (from 1899)
12		George Reid; MLA for Sydney-King (1845–1918)	1894	3 August 1894	13 September 1899	5 years, 41 days	Free Trade	Reid	Victoria (1837–1901); Governor: Sir William Denison (1855–1861); Sir John Young (1861–1867); Somerset Lowry-Corry, 4th Earl Belmore (1868–1872); Sir Hercules Robinson (1872–1879); Lord Augustus Loftus (1879–1885); Charles Wynn-Carrington, 3rd Baron Carrington (1885–1890); Victor Child Villiers, 7th Earl of Jersey (1891–1893); Sir Robert Duff (1893–1895); Henry Brand, 2nd Viscount Hampden (1895–1899); William Lygon, 7th Earl Beauchamp (from 1899)
12		George Reid; MLA for Sydney-King (1845–1918)	1895	3 August 1894	13 September 1899	5 years, 41 days	Free Trade	Reid	Victoria (1837–1901); Governor: Sir William Denison (1855–1861); Sir John Young (1861–1867); Somerset Lowry-Corry, 4th Earl Belmore (1868–1872); Sir Hercules Robinson (1872–1879); Lord Augustus Loftus (1879–1885); Charles Wynn-Carrington, 3rd Baron Carrington (1885–1890); Victor Child Villiers, 7th Earl of Jersey (1891–1893); Sir Robert Duff (1893–1895); Henry Brand, 2nd Viscount Hampden (1895–1899); William Lygon, 7th Earl Beauchamp (from 1899)
12		George Reid; MLA for Sydney-King (1845–1918)	1898	3 August 1894	13 September 1899	5 years, 41 days	Free Trade	Reid	Victoria (1837–1901); Governor: Sir William Denison (1855–1861); Sir John Young (1861–1867); Somerset Lowry-Corry, 4th Earl Belmore (1868–1872); Sir Hercules Robinson (1872–1879); Lord Augustus Loftus (1879–1885); Charles Wynn-Carrington, 3rd Baron Carrington (1885–1890); Victor Child Villiers, 7th Earl of Jersey (1891–1893); Sir Robert Duff (1893–1895); Henry Brand, 2nd Viscount Hampden (1895–1899); William Lygon, 7th Earl Beauchamp (from 1899)
13		Sir William Lyne; MLA for Hume (1844–1913)	—	14 September 1899	27 March 1901	1 year, 194 days	Protectionist	Lyne	Victoria (1837–1901); Governor: Sir William Denison (1855–1861); Sir John Young (1861–1867); Somerset Lowry-Corry, 4th Earl Belmore (1868–1872); Sir Hercules Robinson (1872–1879); Lord Augustus Loftus (1879–1885); Charles Wynn-Carrington, 3rd Baron Carrington (1885–1890); Victor Child Villiers, 7th Earl of Jersey (1891–1893); Sir Robert Duff (1893–1895); Henry Brand, 2nd Viscount Hampden (1895–1899); William Lygon, 7th Earl Beauchamp (from 1899)
13		Sir William Lyne; MLA for Hume (1844–1913)	—	14 September 1899	27 March 1901	1 year, 194 days	Protectionist	Lyne	Edward VII (1901–1910); Governor: William Lygon, 7th Earl Beauchamp (until 1901); Sir Harry Rawson (1902–1909); Frederic Thesiger, 3rd Baron Chelmsford (from 1909)
14		Sir John See; MLA for Grafton (1844–1907)	1901	28 March 1901	14 June 1904	3 years, 78 days	Progressive	See	Edward VII (1901–1910); Governor: William Lygon, 7th Earl Beauchamp (until 1901); Sir Harry Rawson (1902–1909); Frederic Thesiger, 3rd Baron Chelmsford (from 1909)
15		Thomas Waddell; MLA for Cowra (1854–1940)	—	15 June 1904	29 August 1904	75 days	Progressive	Waddell	Edward VII (1901–1910); Governor: William Lygon, 7th Earl Beauchamp (until 1901); Sir Harry Rawson (1902–1909); Frederic Thesiger, 3rd Baron Chelmsford (from 1909)
16		Sir Joseph Carruthers; MLA for St George (1857–1932)	1904	29 August 1904	1 October 1907	3 years, 33 days	Liberal Reform	Carruthers	Edward VII (1901–1910); Governor: William Lygon, 7th Earl Beauchamp (until 1901); Sir Harry Rawson (1902–1909); Frederic Thesiger, 3rd Baron Chelmsford (from 1909)
16		Sir Joseph Carruthers; MLA for St George (1857–1932)	1907	29 August 1904	1 October 1907	3 years, 33 days	Liberal Reform	Carruthers	Edward VII (1901–1910); Governor: William Lygon, 7th Earl Beauchamp (until 1901); Sir Harry Rawson (1902–1909); Frederic Thesiger, 3rd Baron Chelmsford (from 1909)
17		Charles Wade; MLA for Gordon (1863–1922)	—	2 October 1907	1 October 1910	2 years, 364 days	Liberal Reform	Wade	Edward VII (1901–1910); Governor: William Lygon, 7th Earl Beauchamp (until 1901); Sir Harry Rawson (1902–1909); Frederic Thesiger, 3rd Baron Chelmsford (from 1909)
17		Charles Wade; MLA for Gordon (1863–1922)	—	2 October 1907	1 October 1910	2 years, 364 days	Liberal Reform	Wade	George V (1910–1936); Governor: Frederic Thesiger, 3rd Baron Chelmsford (until 1913); Sir Gerald Strickland (1913–1917); Sir Walter Davidson (1918–1923); Sir Dudley de Chair (1924–1930); Sir Philip Game (1930–1935); Alexander Hore-Ruthven, 1st Baron Gowrie (from 1935)
18		James McGowen; MLA for Redfern (1855–1922)	1910	21 October 1910	29 June 1913	2 years, 251 days	Labor	McGowen	George V (1910–1936); Governor: Frederic Thesiger, 3rd Baron Chelmsford (until 1913); Sir Gerald Strickland (1913–1917); Sir Walter Davidson (1918–1923); Sir Dudley de Chair (1924–1930); Sir Philip Game (1930–1935); Alexander Hore-Ruthven, 1st Baron Gowrie (from 1935)
19		William Holman; MLA for Cootamundra (1871–1934)	—	30 June 1913	12 April 1920	6 years, 287 days	Labor	Holman I	George V (1910–1936); Governor: Frederic Thesiger, 3rd Baron Chelmsford (until 1913); Sir Gerald Strickland (1913–1917); Sir Walter Davidson (1918–1923); Sir Dudley de Chair (1924–1930); Sir Philip Game (1930–1935); Alexander Hore-Ruthven, 1st Baron Gowrie (from 1935)
19		William Holman; MLA for Cootamundra (1871–1934)	1913	30 June 1913	12 April 1920	6 years, 287 days	Labor	Holman I	George V (1910–1936); Governor: Frederic Thesiger, 3rd Baron Chelmsford (until 1913); Sir Gerald Strickland (1913–1917); Sir Walter Davidson (1918–1923); Sir Dudley de Chair (1924–1930); Sir Philip Game (1930–1935); Alexander Hore-Ruthven, 1st Baron Gowrie (from 1935)
		William Holman; MLA for Cootamundra (1871–1934)	—	30 June 1913	12 April 1920	6 years, 287 days	Nationalist	Holman II	George V (1910–1936); Governor: Frederic Thesiger, 3rd Baron Chelmsford (until 1913); Sir Gerald Strickland (1913–1917); Sir Walter Davidson (1918–1923); Sir Dudley de Chair (1924–1930); Sir Philip Game (1930–1935); Alexander Hore-Ruthven, 1st Baron Gowrie (from 1935)
		William Holman; MLA for Cootamundra (1871–1934)	1917	30 June 1913	12 April 1920	6 years, 287 days	Nationalist	Holman II	George V (1910–1936); Governor: Frederic Thesiger, 3rd Baron Chelmsford (until 1913); Sir Gerald Strickland (1913–1917); Sir Walter Davidson (1918–1923); Sir Dudley de Chair (1924–1930); Sir Philip Game (1930–1935); Alexander Hore-Ruthven, 1st Baron Gowrie (from 1935)
20		John Storey; MLA for Balmain (1869–1921)	1920	13 April 1920	5 October 1921	1 year, 175 days	Labor	Storey	George V (1910–1936); Governor: Frederic Thesiger, 3rd Baron Chelmsford (until 1913); Sir Gerald Strickland (1913–1917); Sir Walter Davidson (1918–1923); Sir Dudley de Chair (1924–1930); Sir Philip Game (1930–1935); Alexander Hore-Ruthven, 1st Baron Gowrie (from 1935)
21		James Dooley; MLA for Bathurst (1877–1950)	—	5 October 1921	20 December 1921	76 days	Labor	Dooley I	George V (1910–1936); Governor: Frederic Thesiger, 3rd Baron Chelmsford (until 1913); Sir Gerald Strickland (1913–1917); Sir Walter Davidson (1918–1923); Sir Dudley de Chair (1924–1930); Sir Philip Game (1930–1935); Alexander Hore-Ruthven, 1st Baron Gowrie (from 1935)
22		Sir George Fuller; MLA for Wollondilly (1861–1940)	—	20 December 1921	20 December 1921	7 hours	Nationalist	Fuller I	George V (1910–1936); Governor: Frederic Thesiger, 3rd Baron Chelmsford (until 1913); Sir Gerald Strickland (1913–1917); Sir Walter Davidson (1918–1923); Sir Dudley de Chair (1924–1930); Sir Philip Game (1930–1935); Alexander Hore-Ruthven, 1st Baron Gowrie (from 1935)
(21)		James Dooley; MLA for Bathurst (1877–1950)	—	20 December 1921	13 April 1922	114 days	Labor	Dooley II	George V (1910–1936); Governor: Frederic Thesiger, 3rd Baron Chelmsford (until 1913); Sir Gerald Strickland (1913–1917); Sir Walter Davidson (1918–1923); Sir Dudley de Chair (1924–1930); Sir Philip Game (1930–1935); Alexander Hore-Ruthven, 1st Baron Gowrie (from 1935)
(22)		Sir George Fuller; MLA for Wollondilly (1861–1940)	1922	13 April 1922	17 June 1925	3 years, 55 days	Nationalist	Fuller II	George V (1910–1936); Governor: Frederic Thesiger, 3rd Baron Chelmsford (until 1913); Sir Gerald Strickland (1913–1917); Sir Walter Davidson (1918–1923); Sir Dudley de Chair (1924–1930); Sir Philip Game (1930–1935); Alexander Hore-Ruthven, 1st Baron Gowrie (from 1935)
23		Jack Lang; MLA for Parramatta (1876–1975)	1925	17 June 1925	18 October 1927	2 years, 123 days	Labor	Lang I	George V (1910–1936); Governor: Frederic Thesiger, 3rd Baron Chelmsford (until 1913); Sir Gerald Strickland (1913–1917); Sir Walter Davidson (1918–1923); Sir Dudley de Chair (1924–1930); Sir Philip Game (1930–1935); Alexander Hore-Ruthven, 1st Baron Gowrie (from 1935)
23		Jack Lang; MLA for Parramatta (1876–1975)	—	17 June 1925	18 October 1927	2 years, 123 days	Labor	Lang II	George V (1910–1936); Governor: Frederic Thesiger, 3rd Baron Chelmsford (until 1913); Sir Gerald Strickland (1913–1917); Sir Walter Davidson (1918–1923); Sir Dudley de Chair (1924–1930); Sir Philip Game (1930–1935); Alexander Hore-Ruthven, 1st Baron Gowrie (from 1935)
24		Thomas Bavin; MLA for Gordon (1874–1941)	1927	18 October 1927	4 November 1930	3 years, 17 days	Nationalist	Bavin	George V (1910–1936); Governor: Frederic Thesiger, 3rd Baron Chelmsford (until 1913); Sir Gerald Strickland (1913–1917); Sir Walter Davidson (1918–1923); Sir Dudley de Chair (1924–1930); Sir Philip Game (1930–1935); Alexander Hore-Ruthven, 1st Baron Gowrie (from 1935)
(23)		Jack Lang; MLA for Auburn (1876–1975)	1930	4 November 1930	16 May 1932	1 year, 194 days	Labor (until 1931)	Lang III	George V (1910–1936); Governor: Frederic Thesiger, 3rd Baron Chelmsford (until 1913); Sir Gerald Strickland (1913–1917); Sir Walter Davidson (1918–1923); Sir Dudley de Chair (1924–1930); Sir Philip Game (1930–1935); Alexander Hore-Ruthven, 1st Baron Gowrie (from 1935)
		Jack Lang; MLA for Auburn (1876–1975)	—	4 November 1930	16 May 1932	1 year, 194 days	Lang Labor	Lang III	George V (1910–1936); Governor: Frederic Thesiger, 3rd Baron Chelmsford (until 1913); Sir Gerald Strickland (1913–1917); Sir Walter Davidson (1918–1923); Sir Dudley de Chair (1924–1930); Sir Philip Game (1930–1935); Alexander Hore-Ruthven, 1st Baron Gowrie (from 1935)
25		Bertram Stevens; MLA for Croydon (1889–1973)	—	16 May 1932	5 August 1939	7 years, 81 days	United Australia	Stevens I	George V (1910–1936); Governor: Frederic Thesiger, 3rd Baron Chelmsford (until 1913); Sir Gerald Strickland (1913–1917); Sir Walter Davidson (1918–1923); Sir Dudley de Chair (1924–1930); Sir Philip Game (1930–1935); Alexander Hore-Ruthven, 1st Baron Gowrie (from 1935)
25		Bertram Stevens; MLA for Croydon (1889–1973)	1932	16 May 1932	5 August 1939	7 years, 81 days	United Australia	Stevens I	George V (1910–1936); Governor: Frederic Thesiger, 3rd Baron Chelmsford (until 1913); Sir Gerald Strickland (1913–1917); Sir Walter Davidson (1918–1923); Sir Dudley de Chair (1924–1930); Sir Philip Game (1930–1935); Alexander Hore-Ruthven, 1st Baron Gowrie (from 1935)
25		Bertram Stevens; MLA for Croydon (1889–1973)	1935	16 May 1932	5 August 1939	7 years, 81 days	United Australia	Stevens II	George V (1910–1936); Governor: Frederic Thesiger, 3rd Baron Chelmsford (until 1913); Sir Gerald Strickland (1913–1917); Sir Walter Davidson (1918–1923); Sir Dudley de Chair (1924–1930); Sir Philip Game (1930–1935); Alexander Hore-Ruthven, 1st Baron Gowrie (from 1935)
25		Bertram Stevens; MLA for Croydon (1889–1973)	1935	16 May 1932	5 August 1939	7 years, 81 days	United Australia	Stevens II	Edward VIII (1936); Governor: Alexander Hore-Ruthven, 1st Baron Gowrie (until 1936); Sir David Murray Anderson (1936)
25		Bertram Stevens; MLA for Croydon (1889–1973)	1935	16 May 1932	5 August 1939	7 years, 81 days	United Australia	Stevens II	George VI (1936–1952); Governor: John Loder, 2nd Baron Wakehurst (1937–1946); Sir John Northcott (from 1946)
25		Bertram Stevens; MLA for Croydon (1889–1973)	1938	16 May 1932	5 August 1939	7 years, 81 days	United Australia	Stevens III	George VI (1936–1952); Governor: John Loder, 2nd Baron Wakehurst (1937–1946); Sir John Northcott (from 1946)
26		Alexander Mair; MLA for Albury (1889–1969)	—	5 August 1939	16 May 1941	1 year, 284 days	United Australia	Mair	George VI (1936–1952); Governor: John Loder, 2nd Baron Wakehurst (1937–1946); Sir John Northcott (from 1946)
27		William McKell; MLA for Redfern (1891–1985)	1941	16 May 1941	6 February 1947	5 years, 266 days	Labor	McKell I	George VI (1936–1952); Governor: John Loder, 2nd Baron Wakehurst (1937–1946); Sir John Northcott (from 1946)
27		William McKell; MLA for Redfern (1891–1985)	1944	16 May 1941	6 February 1947	5 years, 266 days	Labor	McKell II	George VI (1936–1952); Governor: John Loder, 2nd Baron Wakehurst (1937–1946); Sir John Northcott (from 1946)
28		Jim McGirr; MLA for Bankstown (until 1950); MLA for Liverpool (from 1950) (1890–1957)	—	6 February 1947	2 April 1952	5 years, 56 days	Labor	McGirr I	George VI (1936–1952); Governor: John Loder, 2nd Baron Wakehurst (1937–1946); Sir John Northcott (from 1946)
28		Jim McGirr; MLA for Bankstown (until 1950); MLA for Liverpool (from 1950) (1890–1957)	1947	6 February 1947	2 April 1952	5 years, 56 days	Labor	McGirr II	George VI (1936–1952); Governor: John Loder, 2nd Baron Wakehurst (1937–1946); Sir John Northcott (from 1946)
28		Jim McGirr; MLA for Bankstown (until 1950); MLA for Liverpool (from 1950) (1890–1957)	1950	6 February 1947	2 April 1952	5 years, 56 days	Labor	McGirr III	George VI (1936–1952); Governor: John Loder, 2nd Baron Wakehurst (1937–1946); Sir John Northcott (from 1946)
28		Jim McGirr; MLA for Bankstown (until 1950); MLA for Liverpool (from 1950) (1890–1957)	1950	6 February 1947	2 April 1952	5 years, 56 days	Labor	McGirr III	Elizabeth II (1952–2022); Governor: Sir John Northcott (until 1957); Sir Eric Woodward (1957–1965); Sir Roden Cutler (1966–1981); Sir James Rowland (1981–1989); Sir David Martin (1989–1990); Peter Sinclair (1990–1996); Gordon Samuels (1996–2001); Dame Marie Bashir (2001–2014); David Hurley (2014–2019); Margaret Beazley (from 2019)
29		Joseph Cahill; MLA for Cook's River (1891–1959)	—	2 April 1952	22 October 1959	7 years, 203 days	Labor	Cahill I	Elizabeth II (1952–2022); Governor: Sir John Northcott (until 1957); Sir Eric Woodward (1957–1965); Sir Roden Cutler (1966–1981); Sir James Rowland (1981–1989); Sir David Martin (1989–1990); Peter Sinclair (1990–1996); Gordon Samuels (1996–2001); Dame Marie Bashir (2001–2014); David Hurley (2014–2019); Margaret Beazley (from 2019)
29		Joseph Cahill; MLA for Cook's River (1891–1959)	1953	2 April 1952	22 October 1959	7 years, 203 days	Labor	Cahill II	Elizabeth II (1952–2022); Governor: Sir John Northcott (until 1957); Sir Eric Woodward (1957–1965); Sir Roden Cutler (1966–1981); Sir James Rowland (1981–1989); Sir David Martin (1989–1990); Peter Sinclair (1990–1996); Gordon Samuels (1996–2001); Dame Marie Bashir (2001–2014); David Hurley (2014–2019); Margaret Beazley (from 2019)
29		Joseph Cahill; MLA for Cook's River (1891–1959)	1956	2 April 1952	22 October 1959	7 years, 203 days	Labor	Cahill III	Elizabeth II (1952–2022); Governor: Sir John Northcott (until 1957); Sir Eric Woodward (1957–1965); Sir Roden Cutler (1966–1981); Sir James Rowland (1981–1989); Sir David Martin (1989–1990); Peter Sinclair (1990–1996); Gordon Samuels (1996–2001); Dame Marie Bashir (2001–2014); David Hurley (2014–2019); Margaret Beazley (from 2019)
29		Joseph Cahill; MLA for Cook's River (1891–1959)	1959	2 April 1952	22 October 1959	7 years, 203 days	Labor	Cahill IV	Elizabeth II (1952–2022); Governor: Sir John Northcott (until 1957); Sir Eric Woodward (1957–1965); Sir Roden Cutler (1966–1981); Sir James Rowland (1981–1989); Sir David Martin (1989–1990); Peter Sinclair (1990–1996); Gordon Samuels (1996–2001); Dame Marie Bashir (2001–2014); David Hurley (2014–2019); Margaret Beazley (from 2019)
30		Bob Heffron; MLA for Maroubra (1890–1978)	—	23 October 1959	30 April 1964	4 years, 190 days	Labor	Heffron I	Elizabeth II (1952–2022); Governor: Sir John Northcott (until 1957); Sir Eric Woodward (1957–1965); Sir Roden Cutler (1966–1981); Sir James Rowland (1981–1989); Sir David Martin (1989–1990); Peter Sinclair (1990–1996); Gordon Samuels (1996–2001); Dame Marie Bashir (2001–2014); David Hurley (2014–2019); Margaret Beazley (from 2019)
30		Bob Heffron; MLA for Maroubra (1890–1978)	1962	23 October 1959	30 April 1964	4 years, 190 days	Labor	Heffron II	Elizabeth II (1952–2022); Governor: Sir John Northcott (until 1957); Sir Eric Woodward (1957–1965); Sir Roden Cutler (1966–1981); Sir James Rowland (1981–1989); Sir David Martin (1989–1990); Peter Sinclair (1990–1996); Gordon Samuels (1996–2001); Dame Marie Bashir (2001–2014); David Hurley (2014–2019); Margaret Beazley (from 2019)
31		Jack Renshaw; MLA for Castlereagh (1909–1987)	—	30 April 1964	13 May 1965	1 year, 13 days	Labor	Renshaw	Elizabeth II (1952–2022); Governor: Sir John Northcott (until 1957); Sir Eric Woodward (1957–1965); Sir Roden Cutler (1966–1981); Sir James Rowland (1981–1989); Sir David Martin (1989–1990); Peter Sinclair (1990–1996); Gordon Samuels (1996–2001); Dame Marie Bashir (2001–2014); David Hurley (2014–2019); Margaret Beazley (from 2019)
32		Sir Robert Askin; MLA for Collaroy (until 1973); MLA for Pittwater (from 1973) (1907–1981)	1965	13 May 1965	3 January 1975	9 years, 235 days	Liberal	Askin I	Elizabeth II (1952–2022); Governor: Sir John Northcott (until 1957); Sir Eric Woodward (1957–1965); Sir Roden Cutler (1966–1981); Sir James Rowland (1981–1989); Sir David Martin (1989–1990); Peter Sinclair (1990–1996); Gordon Samuels (1996–2001); Dame Marie Bashir (2001–2014); David Hurley (2014–2019); Margaret Beazley (from 2019)
32		Sir Robert Askin; MLA for Collaroy (until 1973); MLA for Pittwater (from 1973) (1907–1981)	1968	13 May 1965	3 January 1975	9 years, 235 days	Liberal	Askin II	Elizabeth II (1952–2022); Governor: Sir John Northcott (until 1957); Sir Eric Woodward (1957–1965); Sir Roden Cutler (1966–1981); Sir James Rowland (1981–1989); Sir David Martin (1989–1990); Peter Sinclair (1990–1996); Gordon Samuels (1996–2001); Dame Marie Bashir (2001–2014); David Hurley (2014–2019); Margaret Beazley (from 2019)
32		Sir Robert Askin; MLA for Collaroy (until 1973); MLA for Pittwater (from 1973) (1907–1981)	—	13 May 1965	3 January 1975	9 years, 235 days	Liberal	Askin III	Elizabeth II (1952–2022); Governor: Sir John Northcott (until 1957); Sir Eric Woodward (1957–1965); Sir Roden Cutler (1966–1981); Sir James Rowland (1981–1989); Sir David Martin (1989–1990); Peter Sinclair (1990–1996); Gordon Samuels (1996–2001); Dame Marie Bashir (2001–2014); David Hurley (2014–2019); Margaret Beazley (from 2019)
32		Sir Robert Askin; MLA for Collaroy (until 1973); MLA for Pittwater (from 1973) (1907–1981)	1971	13 May 1965	3 January 1975	9 years, 235 days	Liberal	Askin IV	Elizabeth II (1952–2022); Governor: Sir John Northcott (until 1957); Sir Eric Woodward (1957–1965); Sir Roden Cutler (1966–1981); Sir James Rowland (1981–1989); Sir David Martin (1989–1990); Peter Sinclair (1990–1996); Gordon Samuels (1996–2001); Dame Marie Bashir (2001–2014); David Hurley (2014–2019); Margaret Beazley (from 2019)
32		Sir Robert Askin; MLA for Collaroy (until 1973); MLA for Pittwater (from 1973) (1907–1981)	—	13 May 1965	3 January 1975	9 years, 235 days	Liberal	Askin V	Elizabeth II (1952–2022); Governor: Sir John Northcott (until 1957); Sir Eric Woodward (1957–1965); Sir Roden Cutler (1966–1981); Sir James Rowland (1981–1989); Sir David Martin (1989–1990); Peter Sinclair (1990–1996); Gordon Samuels (1996–2001); Dame Marie Bashir (2001–2014); David Hurley (2014–2019); Margaret Beazley (from 2019)
32		Sir Robert Askin; MLA for Collaroy (until 1973); MLA for Pittwater (from 1973) (1907–1981)	1973	13 May 1965	3 January 1975	9 years, 235 days	Liberal	Askin VI	Elizabeth II (1952–2022); Governor: Sir John Northcott (until 1957); Sir Eric Woodward (1957–1965); Sir Roden Cutler (1966–1981); Sir James Rowland (1981–1989); Sir David Martin (1989–1990); Peter Sinclair (1990–1996); Gordon Samuels (1996–2001); Dame Marie Bashir (2001–2014); David Hurley (2014–2019); Margaret Beazley (from 2019)
33		Tom Lewis; MLA for Wollondilly (1922–2016)	—	3 January 1975	23 January 1976	1 year, 20 days	Liberal	Lewis I	Elizabeth II (1952–2022); Governor: Sir John Northcott (until 1957); Sir Eric Woodward (1957–1965); Sir Roden Cutler (1966–1981); Sir James Rowland (1981–1989); Sir David Martin (1989–1990); Peter Sinclair (1990–1996); Gordon Samuels (1996–2001); Dame Marie Bashir (2001–2014); David Hurley (2014–2019); Margaret Beazley (from 2019)
33		Tom Lewis; MLA for Wollondilly (1922–2016)	—	3 January 1975	23 January 1976	1 year, 20 days	Liberal	Lewis II	Elizabeth II (1952–2022); Governor: Sir John Northcott (until 1957); Sir Eric Woodward (1957–1965); Sir Roden Cutler (1966–1981); Sir James Rowland (1981–1989); Sir David Martin (1989–1990); Peter Sinclair (1990–1996); Gordon Samuels (1996–2001); Dame Marie Bashir (2001–2014); David Hurley (2014–2019); Margaret Beazley (from 2019)
34		Sir Eric Willis; MLA for Earlwood (1922–1999)	—	23 January 1976	14 May 1976	112 days	Liberal	Willis	Elizabeth II (1952–2022); Governor: Sir John Northcott (until 1957); Sir Eric Woodward (1957–1965); Sir Roden Cutler (1966–1981); Sir James Rowland (1981–1989); Sir David Martin (1989–1990); Peter Sinclair (1990–1996); Gordon Samuels (1996–2001); Dame Marie Bashir (2001–2014); David Hurley (2014–2019); Margaret Beazley (from 2019)
35		Neville Wran; MLA for Bass Hill (1926–2014)	1976	14 May 1976	4 July 1986	10 years, 21 days	Labor	Wran I	Elizabeth II (1952–2022); Governor: Sir John Northcott (until 1957); Sir Eric Woodward (1957–1965); Sir Roden Cutler (1966–1981); Sir James Rowland (1981–1989); Sir David Martin (1989–1990); Peter Sinclair (1990–1996); Gordon Samuels (1996–2001); Dame Marie Bashir (2001–2014); David Hurley (2014–2019); Margaret Beazley (from 2019)
35		Neville Wran; MLA for Bass Hill (1926–2014)	1978	14 May 1976	4 July 1986	10 years, 21 days	Labor	Wran II	Elizabeth II (1952–2022); Governor: Sir John Northcott (until 1957); Sir Eric Woodward (1957–1965); Sir Roden Cutler (1966–1981); Sir James Rowland (1981–1989); Sir David Martin (1989–1990); Peter Sinclair (1990–1996); Gordon Samuels (1996–2001); Dame Marie Bashir (2001–2014); David Hurley (2014–2019); Margaret Beazley (from 2019)
35		Neville Wran; MLA for Bass Hill (1926–2014)	—	14 May 1976	4 July 1986	10 years, 21 days	Labor	Wran III	Elizabeth II (1952–2022); Governor: Sir John Northcott (until 1957); Sir Eric Woodward (1957–1965); Sir Roden Cutler (1966–1981); Sir James Rowland (1981–1989); Sir David Martin (1989–1990); Peter Sinclair (1990–1996); Gordon Samuels (1996–2001); Dame Marie Bashir (2001–2014); David Hurley (2014–2019); Margaret Beazley (from 2019)
35		Neville Wran; MLA for Bass Hill (1926–2014)	1981	14 May 1976	4 July 1986	10 years, 21 days	Labor	Wran IV	Elizabeth II (1952–2022); Governor: Sir John Northcott (until 1957); Sir Eric Woodward (1957–1965); Sir Roden Cutler (1966–1981); Sir James Rowland (1981–1989); Sir David Martin (1989–1990); Peter Sinclair (1990–1996); Gordon Samuels (1996–2001); Dame Marie Bashir (2001–2014); David Hurley (2014–2019); Margaret Beazley (from 2019)
35		Neville Wran; MLA for Bass Hill (1926–2014)	—	14 May 1976	4 July 1986	10 years, 21 days	Labor	Wran V	Elizabeth II (1952–2022); Governor: Sir John Northcott (until 1957); Sir Eric Woodward (1957–1965); Sir Roden Cutler (1966–1981); Sir James Rowland (1981–1989); Sir David Martin (1989–1990); Peter Sinclair (1990–1996); Gordon Samuels (1996–2001); Dame Marie Bashir (2001–2014); David Hurley (2014–2019); Margaret Beazley (from 2019)
35		Neville Wran; MLA for Bass Hill (1926–2014)	—	14 May 1976	4 July 1986	10 years, 21 days	Labor	Wran VI	Elizabeth II (1952–2022); Governor: Sir John Northcott (until 1957); Sir Eric Woodward (1957–1965); Sir Roden Cutler (1966–1981); Sir James Rowland (1981–1989); Sir David Martin (1989–1990); Peter Sinclair (1990–1996); Gordon Samuels (1996–2001); Dame Marie Bashir (2001–2014); David Hurley (2014–2019); Margaret Beazley (from 2019)
35		Neville Wran; MLA for Bass Hill (1926–2014)	1984	14 May 1976	4 July 1986	10 years, 21 days	Labor	Wran VII	Elizabeth II (1952–2022); Governor: Sir John Northcott (until 1957); Sir Eric Woodward (1957–1965); Sir Roden Cutler (1966–1981); Sir James Rowland (1981–1989); Sir David Martin (1989–1990); Peter Sinclair (1990–1996); Gordon Samuels (1996–2001); Dame Marie Bashir (2001–2014); David Hurley (2014–2019); Margaret Beazley (from 2019)
35		Neville Wran; MLA for Bass Hill (1926–2014)	—	14 May 1976	4 July 1986	10 years, 21 days	Labor	Wran VIII	Elizabeth II (1952–2022); Governor: Sir John Northcott (until 1957); Sir Eric Woodward (1957–1965); Sir Roden Cutler (1966–1981); Sir James Rowland (1981–1989); Sir David Martin (1989–1990); Peter Sinclair (1990–1996); Gordon Samuels (1996–2001); Dame Marie Bashir (2001–2014); David Hurley (2014–2019); Margaret Beazley (from 2019)
36		Barrie Unsworth; MLA for Rockdale (born 1934)	—	4 July 1986	25 March 1988	1 year, 295 days	Labor	Unsworth	Elizabeth II (1952–2022); Governor: Sir John Northcott (until 1957); Sir Eric Woodward (1957–1965); Sir Roden Cutler (1966–1981); Sir James Rowland (1981–1989); Sir David Martin (1989–1990); Peter Sinclair (1990–1996); Gordon Samuels (1996–2001); Dame Marie Bashir (2001–2014); David Hurley (2014–2019); Margaret Beazley (from 2019)
37		Nick Greiner; MP for Ku-ring-gai (born 1947)	1988	25 March 1988	24 June 1992	4 years, 91 days	Liberal	Greiner I	Elizabeth II (1952–2022); Governor: Sir John Northcott (until 1957); Sir Eric Woodward (1957–1965); Sir Roden Cutler (1966–1981); Sir James Rowland (1981–1989); Sir David Martin (1989–1990); Peter Sinclair (1990–1996); Gordon Samuels (1996–2001); Dame Marie Bashir (2001–2014); David Hurley (2014–2019); Margaret Beazley (from 2019)
37		Nick Greiner; MP for Ku-ring-gai (born 1947)	1991	25 March 1988	24 June 1992	4 years, 91 days	Liberal	Greiner II	Elizabeth II (1952–2022); Governor: Sir John Northcott (until 1957); Sir Eric Woodward (1957–1965); Sir Roden Cutler (1966–1981); Sir James Rowland (1981–1989); Sir David Martin (1989–1990); Peter Sinclair (1990–1996); Gordon Samuels (1996–2001); Dame Marie Bashir (2001–2014); David Hurley (2014–2019); Margaret Beazley (from 2019)
38		John Fahey; MP for Southern Highlands (1945–2020)	—	24 June 1992	4 April 1995	2 years, 284 days	Liberal	Fahey I	Elizabeth II (1952–2022); Governor: Sir John Northcott (until 1957); Sir Eric Woodward (1957–1965); Sir Roden Cutler (1966–1981); Sir James Rowland (1981–1989); Sir David Martin (1989–1990); Peter Sinclair (1990–1996); Gordon Samuels (1996–2001); Dame Marie Bashir (2001–2014); David Hurley (2014–2019); Margaret Beazley (from 2019)
38		John Fahey; MP for Southern Highlands (1945–2020)	—	24 June 1992	4 April 1995	2 years, 284 days	Liberal	Fahey II	Elizabeth II (1952–2022); Governor: Sir John Northcott (until 1957); Sir Eric Woodward (1957–1965); Sir Roden Cutler (1966–1981); Sir James Rowland (1981–1989); Sir David Martin (1989–1990); Peter Sinclair (1990–1996); Gordon Samuels (1996–2001); Dame Marie Bashir (2001–2014); David Hurley (2014–2019); Margaret Beazley (from 2019)
38		John Fahey; MP for Southern Highlands (1945–2020)	—	24 June 1992	4 April 1995	2 years, 284 days	Liberal	Fahey III	Elizabeth II (1952–2022); Governor: Sir John Northcott (until 1957); Sir Eric Woodward (1957–1965); Sir Roden Cutler (1966–1981); Sir James Rowland (1981–1989); Sir David Martin (1989–1990); Peter Sinclair (1990–1996); Gordon Samuels (1996–2001); Dame Marie Bashir (2001–2014); David Hurley (2014–2019); Margaret Beazley (from 2019)
39		Bob Carr; MP for Maroubra (born 1947)	1995	4 April 1995	3 August 2005	10 years, 121 days	Labor	Carr I	Elizabeth II (1952–2022); Governor: Sir John Northcott (until 1957); Sir Eric Woodward (1957–1965); Sir Roden Cutler (1966–1981); Sir James Rowland (1981–1989); Sir David Martin (1989–1990); Peter Sinclair (1990–1996); Gordon Samuels (1996–2001); Dame Marie Bashir (2001–2014); David Hurley (2014–2019); Margaret Beazley (from 2019)
39		Bob Carr; MP for Maroubra (born 1947)	—	4 April 1995	3 August 2005	10 years, 121 days	Labor	Carr II	Elizabeth II (1952–2022); Governor: Sir John Northcott (until 1957); Sir Eric Woodward (1957–1965); Sir Roden Cutler (1966–1981); Sir James Rowland (1981–1989); Sir David Martin (1989–1990); Peter Sinclair (1990–1996); Gordon Samuels (1996–2001); Dame Marie Bashir (2001–2014); David Hurley (2014–2019); Margaret Beazley (from 2019)
39		Bob Carr; MP for Maroubra (born 1947)	1999	4 April 1995	3 August 2005	10 years, 121 days	Labor	Carr III	Elizabeth II (1952–2022); Governor: Sir John Northcott (until 1957); Sir Eric Woodward (1957–1965); Sir Roden Cutler (1966–1981); Sir James Rowland (1981–1989); Sir David Martin (1989–1990); Peter Sinclair (1990–1996); Gordon Samuels (1996–2001); Dame Marie Bashir (2001–2014); David Hurley (2014–2019); Margaret Beazley (from 2019)
39		Bob Carr; MP for Maroubra (born 1947)	2003	4 April 1995	3 August 2005	10 years, 121 days	Labor	Carr IV	Elizabeth II (1952–2022); Governor: Sir John Northcott (until 1957); Sir Eric Woodward (1957–1965); Sir Roden Cutler (1966–1981); Sir James Rowland (1981–1989); Sir David Martin (1989–1990); Peter Sinclair (1990–1996); Gordon Samuels (1996–2001); Dame Marie Bashir (2001–2014); David Hurley (2014–2019); Margaret Beazley (from 2019)
40		Morris Iemma; MP for Lakemba (born 1961)	—	3 August 2005	5 September 2008	3 years, 36 days	Labor	Iemma I	Elizabeth II (1952–2022); Governor: Sir John Northcott (until 1957); Sir Eric Woodward (1957–1965); Sir Roden Cutler (1966–1981); Sir James Rowland (1981–1989); Sir David Martin (1989–1990); Peter Sinclair (1990–1996); Gordon Samuels (1996–2001); Dame Marie Bashir (2001–2014); David Hurley (2014–2019); Margaret Beazley (from 2019)
40		Morris Iemma; MP for Lakemba (born 1961)	2007	3 August 2005	5 September 2008	3 years, 36 days	Labor	Iemma II	Elizabeth II (1952–2022); Governor: Sir John Northcott (until 1957); Sir Eric Woodward (1957–1965); Sir Roden Cutler (1966–1981); Sir James Rowland (1981–1989); Sir David Martin (1989–1990); Peter Sinclair (1990–1996); Gordon Samuels (1996–2001); Dame Marie Bashir (2001–2014); David Hurley (2014–2019); Margaret Beazley (from 2019)
41		Nathan Rees; MP for Toongabbie (born 1968)	—	5 September 2008	4 December 2009	1 year, 90 days	Labor	Rees	Elizabeth II (1952–2022); Governor: Sir John Northcott (until 1957); Sir Eric Woodward (1957–1965); Sir Roden Cutler (1966–1981); Sir James Rowland (1981–1989); Sir David Martin (1989–1990); Peter Sinclair (1990–1996); Gordon Samuels (1996–2001); Dame Marie Bashir (2001–2014); David Hurley (2014–2019); Margaret Beazley (from 2019)
42		Kristina Keneally; MP for Heffron (born 1968)	—	4 December 2009	28 March 2011	1 year, 114 days	Labor	Keneally	Elizabeth II (1952–2022); Governor: Sir John Northcott (until 1957); Sir Eric Woodward (1957–1965); Sir Roden Cutler (1966–1981); Sir James Rowland (1981–1989); Sir David Martin (1989–1990); Peter Sinclair (1990–1996); Gordon Samuels (1996–2001); Dame Marie Bashir (2001–2014); David Hurley (2014–2019); Margaret Beazley (from 2019)
43		Barry O'Farrell; MP for Ku-ring-gai (born 1959)	2011	28 March 2011	17 April 2014	3 years, 20 days	Liberal	O'Farrell	Elizabeth II (1952–2022); Governor: Sir John Northcott (until 1957); Sir Eric Woodward (1957–1965); Sir Roden Cutler (1966–1981); Sir James Rowland (1981–1989); Sir David Martin (1989–1990); Peter Sinclair (1990–1996); Gordon Samuels (1996–2001); Dame Marie Bashir (2001–2014); David Hurley (2014–2019); Margaret Beazley (from 2019)
44		Mike Baird; MP for Manly (born 1968)	—	17 April 2014	23 January 2017	2 years, 281 days	Liberal	Baird I	Elizabeth II (1952–2022); Governor: Sir John Northcott (until 1957); Sir Eric Woodward (1957–1965); Sir Roden Cutler (1966–1981); Sir James Rowland (1981–1989); Sir David Martin (1989–1990); Peter Sinclair (1990–1996); Gordon Samuels (1996–2001); Dame Marie Bashir (2001–2014); David Hurley (2014–2019); Margaret Beazley (from 2019)
44		Mike Baird; MP for Manly (born 1968)	2015	17 April 2014	23 January 2017	2 years, 281 days	Liberal	Baird II	Elizabeth II (1952–2022); Governor: Sir John Northcott (until 1957); Sir Eric Woodward (1957–1965); Sir Roden Cutler (1966–1981); Sir James Rowland (1981–1989); Sir David Martin (1989–1990); Peter Sinclair (1990–1996); Gordon Samuels (1996–2001); Dame Marie Bashir (2001–2014); David Hurley (2014–2019); Margaret Beazley (from 2019)
45		Gladys Berejiklian; MP for Willoughby (born 1970)	—	23 January 2017	5 October 2021	4 years, 255 days	Liberal	Berejiklian I	Elizabeth II (1952–2022); Governor: Sir John Northcott (until 1957); Sir Eric Woodward (1957–1965); Sir Roden Cutler (1966–1981); Sir James Rowland (1981–1989); Sir David Martin (1989–1990); Peter Sinclair (1990–1996); Gordon Samuels (1996–2001); Dame Marie Bashir (2001–2014); David Hurley (2014–2019); Margaret Beazley (from 2019)
45		Gladys Berejiklian; MP for Willoughby (born 1970)	2019	23 January 2017	5 October 2021	4 years, 255 days	Liberal	Berejiklian II	Elizabeth II (1952–2022); Governor: Sir John Northcott (until 1957); Sir Eric Woodward (1957–1965); Sir Roden Cutler (1966–1981); Sir James Rowland (1981–1989); Sir David Martin (1989–1990); Peter Sinclair (1990–1996); Gordon Samuels (1996–2001); Dame Marie Bashir (2001–2014); David Hurley (2014–2019); Margaret Beazley (from 2019)
46		Dominic Perrottet; MP for Epping (born 1982)	—	5 October 2021	28 March 2023	1 year, 174 days	Liberal	Perrottet I	Elizabeth II (1952–2022); Governor: Sir John Northcott (until 1957); Sir Eric Woodward (1957–1965); Sir Roden Cutler (1966–1981); Sir James Rowland (1981–1989); Sir David Martin (1989–1990); Peter Sinclair (1990–1996); Gordon Samuels (1996–2001); Dame Marie Bashir (2001–2014); David Hurley (2014–2019); Margaret Beazley (from 2019)
46		Dominic Perrottet; MP for Epping (born 1982)	—	5 October 2021	28 March 2023	1 year, 174 days	Liberal	Perrottet II	Elizabeth II (1952–2022); Governor: Sir John Northcott (until 1957); Sir Eric Woodward (1957–1965); Sir Roden Cutler (1966–1981); Sir James Rowland (1981–1989); Sir David Martin (1989–1990); Peter Sinclair (1990–1996); Gordon Samuels (1996–2001); Dame Marie Bashir (2001–2014); David Hurley (2014–2019); Margaret Beazley (from 2019)
46		Dominic Perrottet; MP for Epping (born 1982)	—	5 October 2021	28 March 2023	1 year, 174 days	Liberal	Perrottet II	Charles III (2022–present); Governor: Margaret Beazley
47		Chris Minns; MP for Kogarah (born 1979)	2023	28 March 2023	Incumbent	3 years, 163 days	Labor	Minns	Charles III (2022–present); Governor: Margaret Beazley

== See also ==
- List of premiers of New South Wales by time in office
- Deputy Premier of New South Wales
- List of New South Wales government agencies
