= Robertson ministry (1860–1861) =

First New South Wales government ministry led by John Robertson

First Robertson ministry
- 6th Cabinet of the Colony of New South Wales

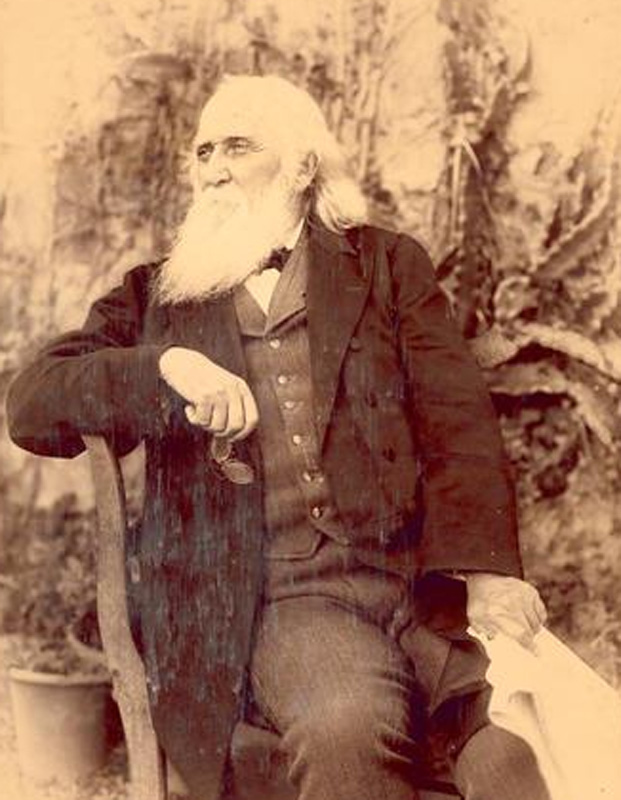
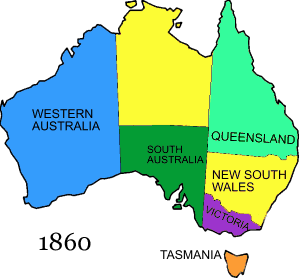
- Premier John Robertson and the Colony of New South Wales (1860–1862)
- Date formed: 8 March 1860
- Date dissolved: 9 January 1861

People and organisations
- Monarch: Queen Victoria
- Governor: William Denison
- Head of government: John Robertson
- No. of ministers: 5
- Member party: unaligned
- Status in legislature: Minority government
- Opposition party: unaligned
- Opposition leader: William Forster; Charles Cowper

History
- Predecessor: Forster ministry
- Successor: Third Cowper ministry

The first Robertson ministry was the sixth ministry of the Colony of New South Wales, and was led by John Robertson. It was the first of five occasions that Robertson was Premier. Robertson was elected in the first free elections for the New South Wales Legislative Assembly held in March 1856.

The title of Premier was widely used to refer to the Leader of Government, but not enshrined in formal use until 1920.

There was no party system in New South Wales politics until 1887. Under the constitution, ministers were required to resign to recontest their seats in a by-election when appointed. Such ministerial by-elections were usually uncontested and on this occasion John Robertson (The Upper Hunter), William Arnold (The Paterson) and Elias Weekes (West Maitland) were all re-elected unopposed.

This ministry covers the period from 9 March 1860 until 9 January 1861, when Robertson resigned his commission.

== Composition of ministry ==
Portfolio	Minister	Term start	Term end	Term length
Premier; Secretary for Lands	John Robertson	9 March 1860	9 January 1861	306 days
Colonial Secretary	Charles Cowper MLC / MLA (Note: Charles Cowper was a member of the Legislative Council until the election in December 1860 when he was elected to the Legislative Assembly as the member for East Sydney.)	9 March 1860	9 January 1861	306 days
Colonial Treasurer	Elias Weekes	9 March 1860	9 January 1861	306 days
Secretary for Public Works	William Arnold	9 March 1860	9 January 1861	306 days
Attorney General; Representative of the Government in the Legislative Council	John Hargrave MLC	9 March 1860	9 January 1861	306 days

Ministers are members of the Legislative Assembly unless otherwise noted.

== See also ==
- Self-government in New South Wales
- Members of the New South Wales Legislative Assembly, 1860–1864
- Second Robertson ministry (1868–1870)
- Third Robertson ministry (1875–1877)
- Fourth Robertson ministry (1877)
- Fifth Robertson ministry (1885–1886)

Preceded by Forster ministry	First Robertson ministry 1860–1861	Succeeded by Third Cowper ministry
