= Cowper ministry (1865–1866) =

Fourth Cowper ministry
- 9th Cabinet of the Colony of New South Wales

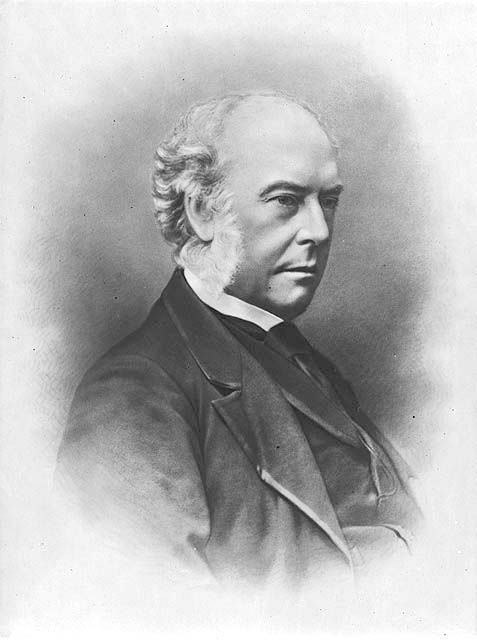
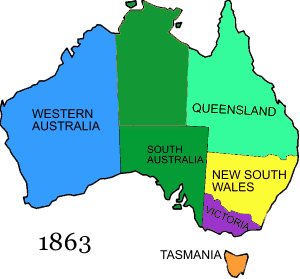
- Premier Charles Cowper and the Colony of New South Wales (1863–1900)
- Date formed: 3 February 1865
- Date dissolved: 21 January 1866

People and organisations
- Monarch: Queen Victoria
- Governor: Sir John Young
- Head of government: Charles Cowper
- No. of ministers: 7
- Member party: unaligned
- Status in legislature: Minority government
- Opposition party: unaligned
- Opposition leader: James Martin

History
- Election: 1864–65
- Predecessor: First Martin ministry
- Successor: Second Martin ministry

The fourth Cowper ministry was the ninth ministry of the Colony of New South Wales, and fourth occasion of being led by Charles Cowper.

Cowper was elected in the first free elections for the New South Wales Legislative Assembly held in March 1856, and fought unsuccessfully with Stuart Donaldson to form Government. When Donaldson's Government faltered a little over two months after it was formed, Cowper formed Government on the first occasion, but he also lost the confidence of the Assembly a few months later. Cowper formed Government on the second occasion between 1857 and 1859; but it also lost the confidence of the Assembly. On the third occasion, Cowper formed Government following the decision by Premier John Robertson to step aside and focus on land reform, however Cowper then lost the confidence to James Martin. Cowper retained government by defeating Martin at the 1864–65 general election.

The title of Premier was widely used to refer to the Leader of Government, but not enshrined in formal use until 1920.

There was no party system in New South Wales politics until 1887. Under the constitution, ministers were required to resign to recontest their seats in a by-election when appointed. Such ministerial by-elections were usually uncontested however on this occasion a poll was required in East Sydney (Charles Cowper), The Glebe (Thomas Smart) and West Sydney (John Darvall and John Robertson). Each minister was comfortably re-elected. Only The Paterson (William Arnold) was uncontested.

This ministry covers the period from 3 February 1865 until 21 January 1866, when Martin was asked to form government after Cowper again lost the confidence of the Assembly in December 1865.

== Composition of ministry ==
Portfolio	Minister	Term start	Term end	Term length
Premier; Colonial Secretary	Charles Cowper	3 February 1865	21 January 1866	352 days
Colonial Treasurer	Thomas Smart	3 February 1865	19 October 1865	258 days
Colonial Treasurer	Saul Samuel	20 October 1865	3 January 1866	75 days
Colonial Treasurer	Marshall Burdekin	4 January 1866	21 January 1866	17 days
Attorney General	John Darvall	3 February 1865	20 June 1865	137 days
Attorney General	John Plunkett	25 August 1865	21 January 1866	149 days
Solicitor General; Representative of the Government in the Legislative Council	John Hargrave MLC	3 February 1865	21 January 1866	352 days
Secretary for Lands	John Robertson	3 February 1865	19 October 1865	258 days
Secretary for Lands	William Arnold	20 October 1865	30 October 1865	10 days
Secretary for Lands	John Robertson	1 January 1866	21 January 1866	20 days
Secretary for Public Works	William Arnold	3 February 1865	19 October 1865	258 days
Secretary for Public Works	Thomas Smart	20 October 1865	21 January 1866	93 days
Postmaster-General (Note: A member of the government without a seat in the Cabinet.)	James Cunneen	1 October 1865	21 January 1866	112 days

Ministers are members of the Legislative Assembly unless otherwise noted.

== See also ==
- Self-government in New South Wales
- Members of the New South Wales Legislative Assembly, 1864–1869
- First Cowper ministry (1856)
- Second Cowper ministry (1857–1859)
- Third Cowper ministry (1861–1863)
- Fifth Cowper ministry (1870)

Preceded by First Martin ministry	Fourth Cowper ministry 1865–1866	Succeeded by Second Martin ministry
