= Robertson ministry (1868–1870) =

Second New South Wales government ministry led by John Robertson

Second Robertson ministry
- 11th Cabinet of the Colony of New South Wales

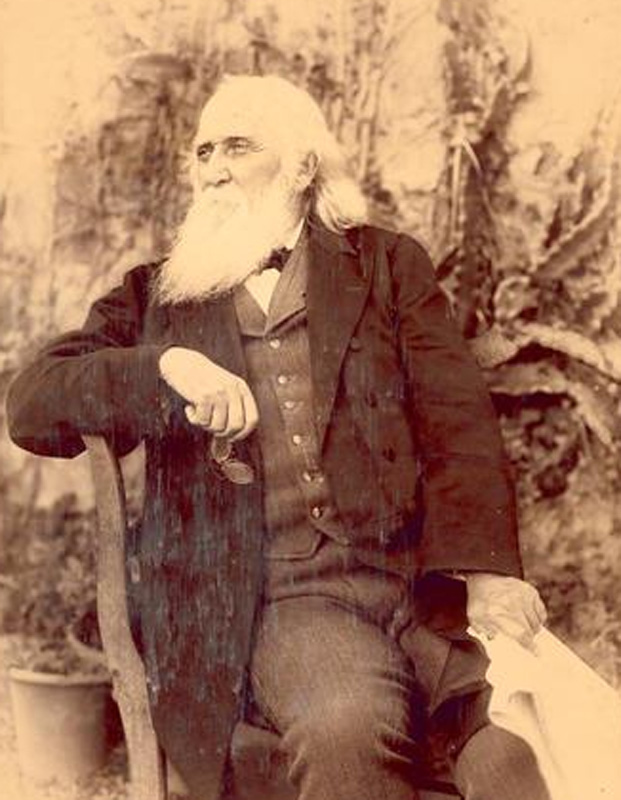
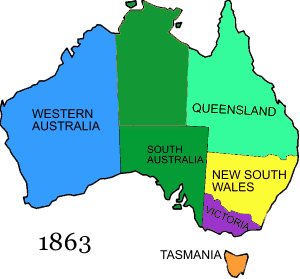
- Premier John Robertson and the Colony of New South Wales (1863–1900)
- Date formed: 27 October 1868
- Date dissolved: 20 January 1870

People and organisations
- Monarch: Queen Victoria
- Governor: The Earl Belmore
- Head of government: John Robertson
- No. of ministers: 8
- Member party: unaligned
- Status in legislature: Minority government
- Opposition party: unaligned
- Opposition leader: James Martin; Charles Cowper

History
- Predecessor: Second Martin ministry
- Successor: Fifth Cowper ministry

The second Robertson ministry was the eleventh ministry of the Colony of New South Wales, and was led by John Robertson. It was the second of five occasions that Robertson was Leader of the Government. Robertson was elected in the first free elections for the New South Wales Legislative Assembly held in March 1856.

The title of Premier was widely used to refer to the Leader of Government, but not enshrined in formal use until 1920.

There was no party system in New South Wales politics until 1887. Under the constitution, ministers were required to resign to recontest their seats in a by-election when appointed. Such ministerial by-elections were usually uncontested and on this occasion a poll was required at Wellington (Saul Samuel) however he was comfortably re-elected with 69% of the vote. The other ministers were all re-elected unopposed.

This ministry covers the period from 27 October 1868 until 12 January 1870, when Robertson resigned his commission after he failed to gain support of the Assembly. Robertson stood aside for his colleague, Charles Cowper.

== Composition of ministry ==
Portfolio	Minister	Term start	Term end	Term length
Premier; Colonial Secretary	John Robertson	27 October 1868	12 January 1870	1 year, 77 days
Colonial Treasurer	Saul Samuel	27 October 1868	12 January 1870	1 year, 77 days
Secretary for Lands	William Forster	27 October 1868	12 January 1870	1 year, 77 days
Secretary for Public Works	John Sutherland	27 October 1868	12 January 1870	1 year, 77 days
Attorney General	Sir William Manning MLC (Note: A Member of the Government without a seat in the Cabinet.)	27 October 1868	12 January 1870	1 year, 77 days
Solicitor General	Joshua Josephson	27 October 1868	9 September 1869	317 days
Solicitor General	Julian Salomons (Note: Julian Salomons was not appointed to the Legislative Council until 11 August 1870, 7 months after his appointment as Solicitor General.)	18 December 1869	12 January 1870	25 days
Postmaster-General	Daniel Egan	27 October 1868	12 January 1870	1 year, 77 days
Representative of the Government in the Legislative Council	Robert Owen MLC (Note: A Member of the Government with a seat in the Cabinet.)	27 October 1868	12 January 1870	1 year, 77 days

Ministers are members of the Legislative Assembly unless otherwise noted.

== See also ==
- Self-government in New South Wales
- Members of the New South Wales Legislative Assembly, 1864–1869
- First Robertson ministry (1860–1861)
- Third Robertson ministry (1875–1877)
- Fourth Robertson ministry (1877)
- Fifth Robertson ministry (1885–1886)

Preceded by Second Martin ministry	Second Robertson ministry 1868–1870	Succeeded by Fifth Cowper ministry
