= Secretary for Lands and Works (New South Wales) =

Government minister in the colony of New South Wales

Secretary for Lands and Works of New South Wales
- Appointer: Governor of New South Wales
- Formation: 8 June 1856
- First holder: Bob Nichols
- Final holder: John Robertson
- Abolished: 30 September 1859
- Succession: Secretary for Lands; Secretary for Public Works

The Secretary for Lands and Works was one of the first ministries in the colonial administration of New South Wales following the establishment of responsible government in 1856.

== Role and responsibilities ==
Under the principles of responsible government, the minister was accountable to parliament not only for the decisions personally made by the minister but was also accountable for the performance of the department. While the first minister Bob Nichols was appointed on 6 June 1856, the department of Lands and Public Works was not formally established until 26 August 1856. The department had three main functions:

1. The administration of lands, including the Surveyor General, Chief Commissioner for Crown Lands, Commissioners for reporting Claims to Grants of Land, Commissioners of Crown Lands for the Gold Districts, Botanical Gardens and Domains, Inspectors of Diseased Sheep, Coal Fields and Coal Mines, Church and School Estates.
2. The administration of public works which was responsible for railways, roads and electric telegraph; harbours and river navigation, the Civil Engineer (Dry Docks, Cockatoo Island) and the Colonial Architect and
3. A Board of Works which oversaw how Treasury funds were spent on public works.

The diversity of the ministers responsibilities included the government flock of Alpacas and Llamas.

In 1859 the ministry was split into the Secretary for Lands and the Secretary for Public Works.

== List of secretaries ==
Title	Minister	Party	Ministry	Term start	Term end	Time in office	Notes
Secretary for Lands and Works	Bob Nichols	No party	Donaldson	6 June 1856	25 August 1856	80 days	
Secretary for Lands and Works	Terence Murray	No party	Cowper (1)	25 August 1856	2 October 1856	38 days	
Secretary for Lands and Works	John Hay	No party	Parker	3 October 1856	7 September 1857	339 days	
Secretary for Lands and Works	Terence Murray	No party	Cowper (2)	7 September 1857	12 January 1858	127 days	
Secretary for Lands and Works	John Robertson	No party	Cowper (2)	13 January 1858	30 September 1859	1 year, 260 days	
