= James Robert Wilshire =

Australian politician (1809–1860)

James Wilshire
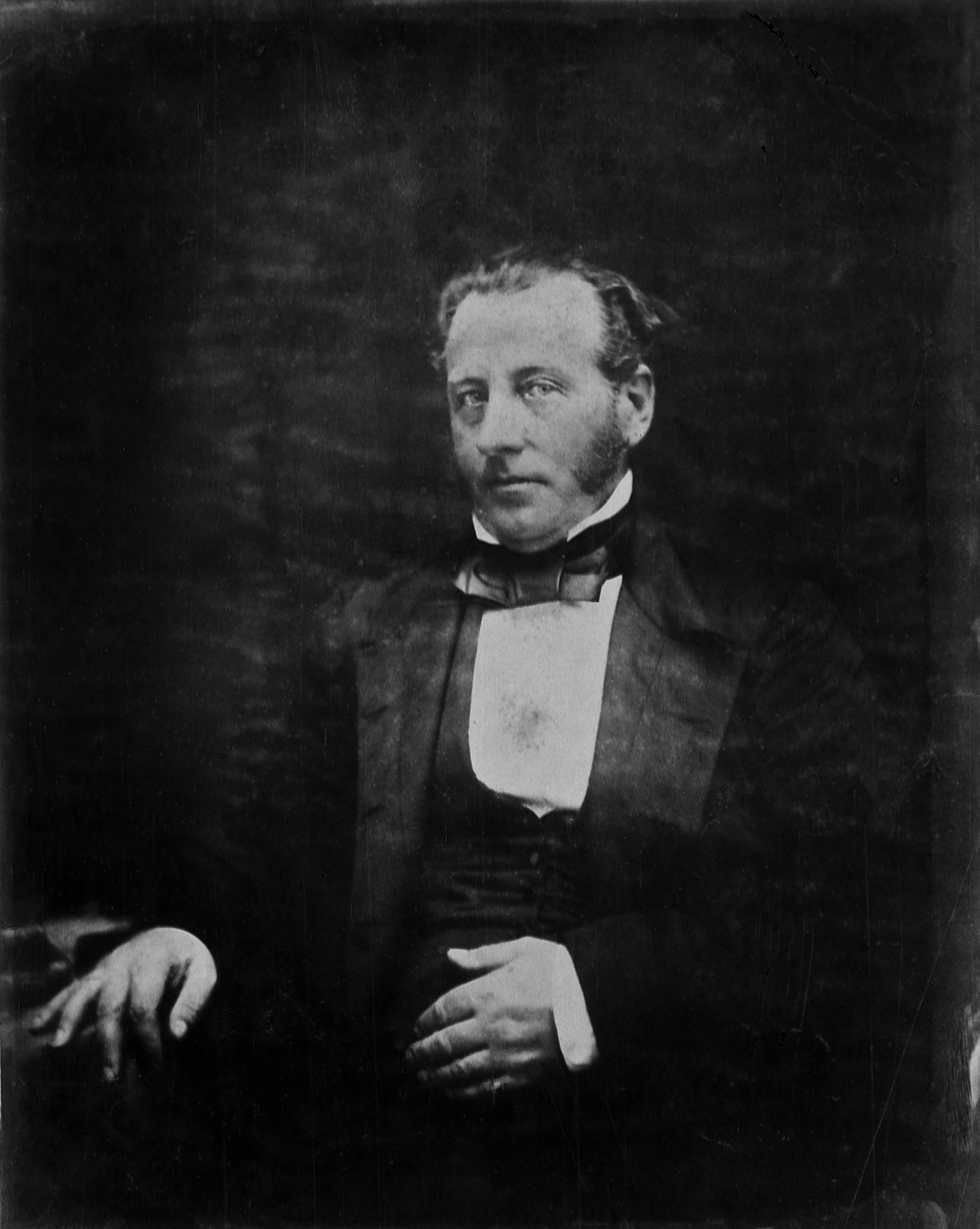

Personal details
- Born: James Robert Wilshire; 29 July 1809 Sydney, Australia
- Died: 30 August 1860 (aged 51) Sydney, New South Wales, Australia

James Robert Wilshire (29 July 1809 – 30 August 1860) was an Australian politician. He was a member of the New South Wales Legislative Council between 1855 and 1856 and again from 1858 until his death. He was also a member of the New South Wales Legislative Assembly for one term between 1856 and 1857.

== Personal life ==
Wilshire was the second son of James Wilshire (1771-1840) and his wife Esther, née Pitt. The Wilshires were one of the oldest colonial families in New South Wales, James's father having arrived in the colony in 1800 to take up a post in the Commissary Department.

Wilshire was educated privately and worked in his father's tannery which he inherited in 1840. He married twice, first to Elizabeth Thompson (in 1836) and, following her death in 1846, married her younger sister, Sarah in 1847. He had twelve children in all, five with Elizabeth, and then seven with Sarah. His oldest, James Thompson Wilshire, became a politician, and his youngest (born a week after his death), Henry Austin Wilshire, became a well-known architect.

== Political activity ==
In November 1842, he was elected as an alderman to the Sydney City Council, and served as the third Mayor of Sydney from 25 September 1843 until November 1844. Wilshire was a political supporter of John Dunmore Lang and a strident opponent of the reintroduction of transportation. He was a generous supporter of the Benevolent Society. In January 1855, prior to the establishment of responsible self-government, Wilshire was returned to the semi-elected Legislative Council for City of Sydney. He represented the electorate of Sydney City in the New South Wales Legislative Assembly from 13 March 1856 to 19 December 1857. Subsequently, at the first election under the new constitution he was elected to the Legislative Assembly as one of the four members for the same seat. Wilshire was defeated at the next election, in 1858. He did not hold a ministerial or parliamentary position. Following his defeat he accepted a five-year appointment to the Legislative Council which he retained until his death.

New South Wales Legislative Council
Preceded by William Thurlow	Member for City of Sydney; Jan 1855 – Feb 1856; With: Robert Campbell, Henry Parkes	Original Council abolished
New South Wales Legislative Assembly
New district	Member for Sydney City; 13 Mar 1856 – 19 Dec 1857; With: Henry Parkes/William Dalley; Charles Cowper; Robert Campbell	Succeeded by George Thornton
Civic offices
Preceded by John Hosking	Mayor of Sydney; Sep 1843–Nov 1844	Succeeded by George Allen
