= Robert Campbell (Australian politician, born 1804) =

Australian politician (1804–1859)

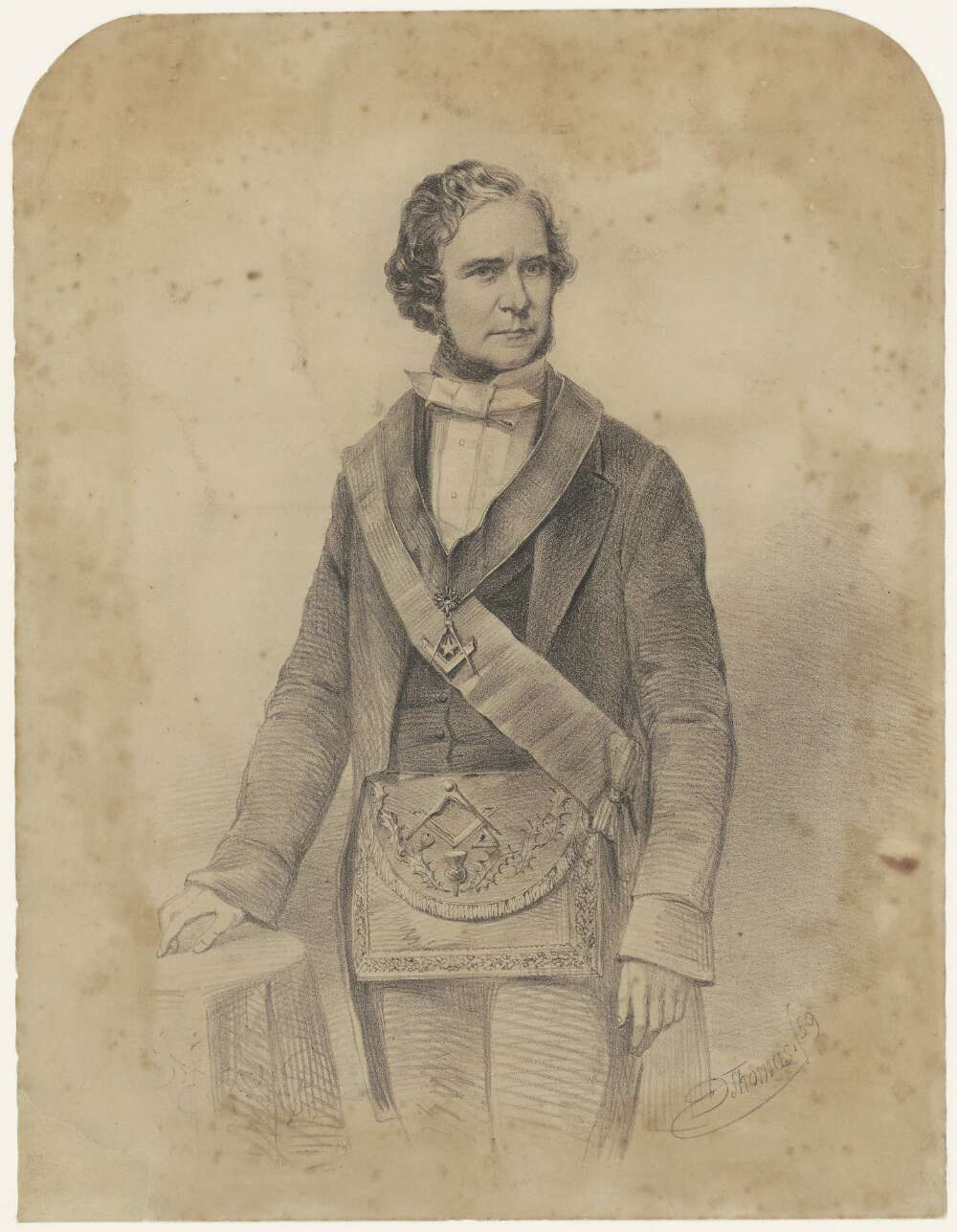
Robert Campbell c. 1859

Robert Campbell (5 October 1804 – 30 March 1859) was an early opponent of penal transportation and an Australian politician, Colonial Treasurer of New South Wales. He was also an elected as a member of the New South Wales Legislative Council and later, the New South Wales Legislative Assembly.

Campbell was the second son of Robert Campbell and born at Campbell's Wharf, The Rocks in Sydney, Australia. In 1810, his parents sent him to Pimlico, London, England to be educated and he returned in 1819.

In 1827, Campbell joined his father's company Campbell and Co. One of his first duties was in January 1828 to travel to England on company business on the barque Lady Blackwood (John Dibbs, Master), returning to Sydney in March 1830, again on the Lady Blackwood. In 1829, (in England) he became active in the anti-transportation campaign. In the early 1830s, he refused to sit on a jury that included emancipists in order to draw attention to this cause and as a result became the leader of the campaign. In 1835, he had married Annie Sophia, daughter of Edward Riley (1784-1825), a merchant and pastoralist in the Sydney area.

In response to an 1846 parliamentary committee recommendation that transportation (which had ceased in 1840) be recommenced, Campbell organized a protest meeting. A petition in opposition to transportation was signed by some 6800 persons was presented to the Legislative Council and the British Government. Nevertheless, the convict ship, the Hashemy, arrived in 1849, but further meetings chaired by Campbell prevented more convicts being sent to Sydney.

In 1851, Campbell was elected to the Legislative Council representing the City of Sydney. In 1856, he was elected to the first Legislative Assembly. He was Colonial Treasurer from August to October 1856 and from January 1858 until his death.

He became ill and died at his father's property at Duntroon in what is now Campbell (named after his father) in Canberra.

His daughter was married to Edward Wolstenholme Ward.His son Frederick Campbell was involved in the formative years of rugby union in Australia with the Wallaroo Football Club and Sydney University Football Club in the late 1860s and early 1870s.

New South Wales Legislative Council
Preceded by William Wentworth; John Dunmore Lang	Member for City of Sydney; 1851 – 1856; With: William Wentworth / Henry Parkes; John Lamb / William Thurlow / James Wilshire	Original Council abolished
New South Wales Legislative Assembly
New assembly	Member for Sydney City; 1856 – 1859; With: Henry Parkes / William Dalley / Robert Tooth; James Wilshire / George Thornton; Charles Cowper	District abolished
