= Electoral district of Sydney City =

Former state electoral district in Australia

Sydney City was an electoral district for the Legislative Assembly in the Australian state of New South Wales from 1856 to 1859, when it was split into the electorates of East Sydney and West Sydney.

== Members for Sydney City ==
Member	Party	Term	Member	Party	Term	Member	Party	Term	Member	Party	Term
Henry Parkes	None	1856–1856	James Wilshire	None	1856–1858	Robert Campbell	None	1856–1859	Charles Cowper	None	1856–1859
William Dalley	None	1856–1858	James Wilshire	None	1856–1858	Robert Campbell	None	1856–1859	Charles Cowper	None	1856–1859
Robert Tooth	None	1858–1859	George Thornton	None	1858–1859	Robert Campbell	None	1856–1859	Charles Cowper	None	1856–1859

== Election results ==
1858 New South Wales colonial election: Sydney City 15 January
Candidate	Votes	%
George Thornton (elected 1)	3,666	21.4
Robert Tooth (elected 2)	2,411	14.1
Robert Campbell (re-elected 3)	2,158	12.6
Charles Cowper (re-elected 4)	2,099	12.2
William Dalley (defeated)	2,035	11.9
Frank Fowler	1,762	10.3
James Wilshire (defeated)	1,557	18.7
William Allen	1,474	8.6
Total formal votes	17,164	100.0
Informal votes	0	0.0
Turnout	17,164	39.7

Robert Tooth had unsuccessfully contested Sydney Hamlets.
