= Charles Cowper =

Australian politician (1807–1875)

Sir Charles Cowper KCMG
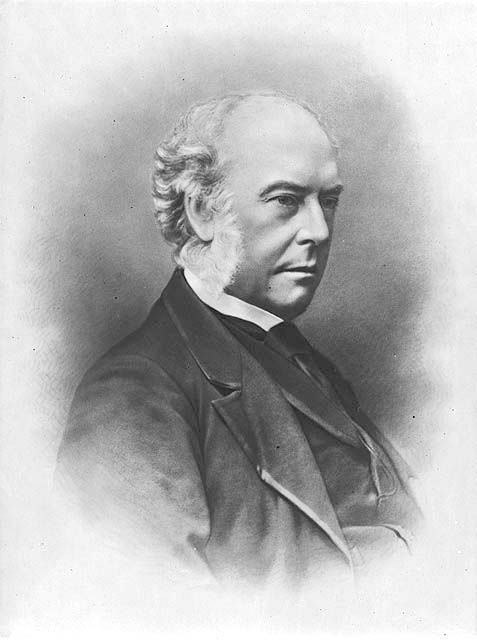

2nd Premier of New South Wales
- In office 26 August 1856 – 2 October 1856
- Monarch: Victoria
- Governor: Sir William Denison
- Preceded by: Stuart Donaldson
- Succeeded by: Henry Parker
- In office 7 September 1857 – 26 October 1859
- Monarch: Victoria
- Governor: Sir William Denison
- Preceded by: Henry Parker
- Succeeded by: William Forster
- In office 10 January 1861 – 15 October 1863
- Monarch: Victoria
- Governor: Sir William Denison; Sir John Young
- Preceded by: John Robertson
- Succeeded by: James Martin
- In office 3 February 1865 – 21 January 1866
- Monarch: Victoria
- Governor: Sir John Young
- Preceded by: James Martin
- Succeeded by: James Martin
- In office 13 January 1870 – 15 December 1870
- Monarch: Victoria
- Governor: The Earl Belmore
- Preceded by: John Robertson
- Succeeded by: Sir James Martin

Personal details
- Born: 26 April 1807 Kingston upon Hull, Yorkshire, England
- Died: 19 October 1875 (aged 68) Kensington, London, England
- Spouse: Eliza Sutton

Sir Charles Cowper (/ˈkaʊpər/), KCMG (26 April 1807 – 19 October 1875) was an Australian politician and the Premier of New South Wales on five occasions from 1856 to 1870.

Cowper's governments had a fairly coherent liberal tendency, a trend which continued with the governments of Henry Parkes and later developed into the Free Trade Party.

== Legislative Council ==
After coming last in the election for the City of Sydney and failing to win County of Cumberland, at the end of 1851, Cowper was elected for County of Durham. He had opposed transportation since the 1840s and had presided at a public meeting protesting plans to revive transportation in October 1846. He also fought transportation vigorously in the Council and in May 1851 he became president of the Australasian League for the Abolition of Transportation, which included representatives of New South Wales, Tasmania, Victoria, South Australia and New Zealand. The association actively campaigned in Britain and, partly as a result, the British Government announced in December 1852 that there would be no more transportation to eastern Australia.

== Premier ==
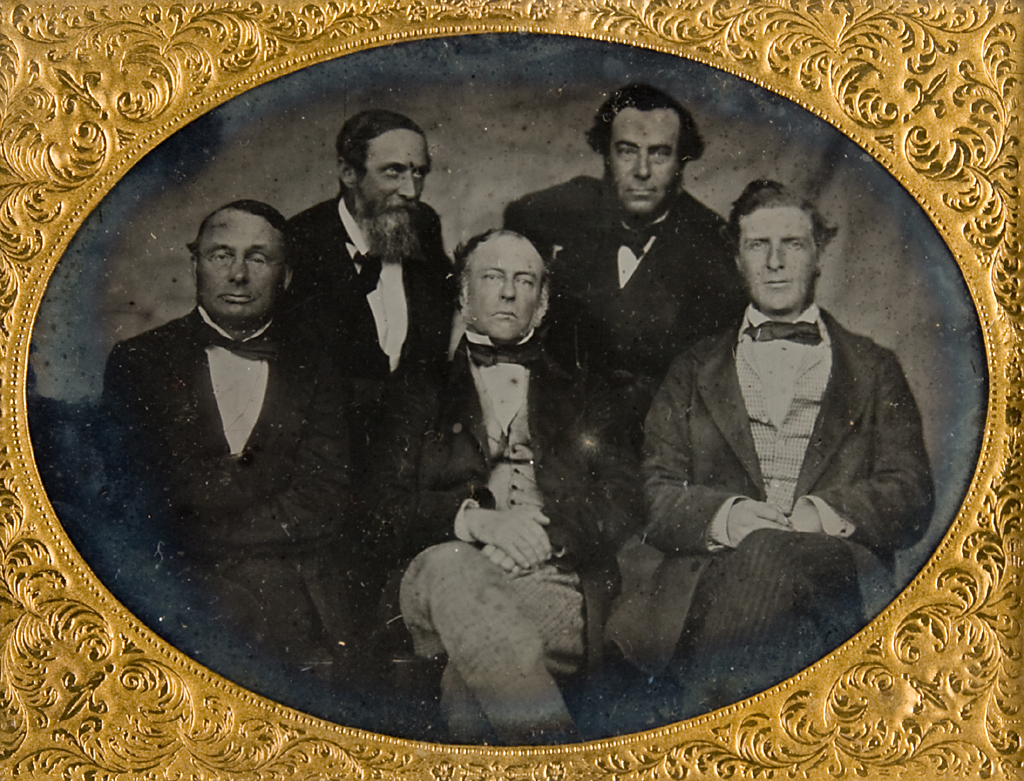
Charles Cowper's ministry (unknown date)

Cowper was elected a member of the first Legislative Assembly in 1856 for Sydney City, which he represented until its abolition in 1859.

Although Cowper was popular in 1856, his open association with the radicals, including Parkes, James Wilshire and Robert Campbell ruled him out from being considered for the premiership. Following Donaldson's resignation in August, Cowper was asked to form Government, but he had no more success than Donaldson in establishing majority support, and was in particular attacked over his choice for Attorney General, James Martin, who had not yet been admitted as a barrister. He was beaten in a no confidence motion and resigned on 2 October.

Cowper turned down a place in the Parker ministry. He subsequently opposed Parker's proposal to create 40 new members in the House, and distribute them according to population, because it did not widen the franchise.

=== Second ministry ===
In September 1857, the Parker Government was defeated and resigned, and Cowper became Premier again. In December, his Government lost a vote on a proposal to increase the rents of pastoralists and to levy an assessment on their stock, but this time Governor Denison agreed to call an election, held in January 1858. Cowper did well enough to remain Premier, but he did not have a reliable majority. His Government amended the Electoral Act to provide vote by secret ballot, universal manhood suffrage, representation primarily by population and more equal electoral districts. It also created 40 new municipalities, established district courts and prohibited grants to support public religious activity. At the June 1859 election, Cowper was returned for East Sydney. His government was beaten on a vote on his educational bill on 26 October 1859 and Cowper resigned from the Assembly the next day. William Forster became Premier and John Robertson became leader of the Opposition. In March 1860, Cowper was appointed to a five-year term in the Legislative Council.

=== Third ministry ===
Robertson formed Government in March 1860 with Cowper as Chief Secretary, and proceeded to bring forward his radical land legislation, involving free selection of crown land before survey and, when blocked in the Assembly, he called an election on the land issue in December. At the election, Cowper returned to the Assembly representing East Sydney. All the candidates who publicly opposed land reform and the abolition of state aid for religious purposes were defeated.

Robertson handed over the Premiership to Cowper on 10 January 1861, while Robertson concentrated on the land bills as Secretary for Lands. Cowper simplified the political situation by sending Parkes to England to recruit immigrants on £1,000 per year. Robertson had his land bills passed by the Assembly on 27 March and resigned from the Assembly so that he could be appointed to the Council on 3 April to complete the process. As the Council was resolutely opposed to the land bills, Robertson persuaded Cowper to ask the new Governor Sir John Young to swamp the Council with 21 new members. The five-year terms of the 1856 Council appointments had run out and the Governor appointed a new Council to life terms, including Robertson. The land bills were passed again by the Assembly in September and by the Council in October 1861. Subsequently, the Cowper Government also passed the Torrens title legislation and the abolition of state aid to religion, although it did not succeed in passing Cowper's education bill, which would have amalgamated the religious and government ("national") school systems. In October 1863, Cowper's government was defeated amidst criticism of its financial management and Martin became Premier.

=== Fourth ministry ===
Cowper's party won the February 1865 election and he became Premier for the fourth time, but he had difficulty in maintaining control of the Assembly. In January 1866 Martin and Parkes, who had returned from London, defeated him and he resigned his seat to look after his private interests in February 1867.

=== Fifth ministry ===
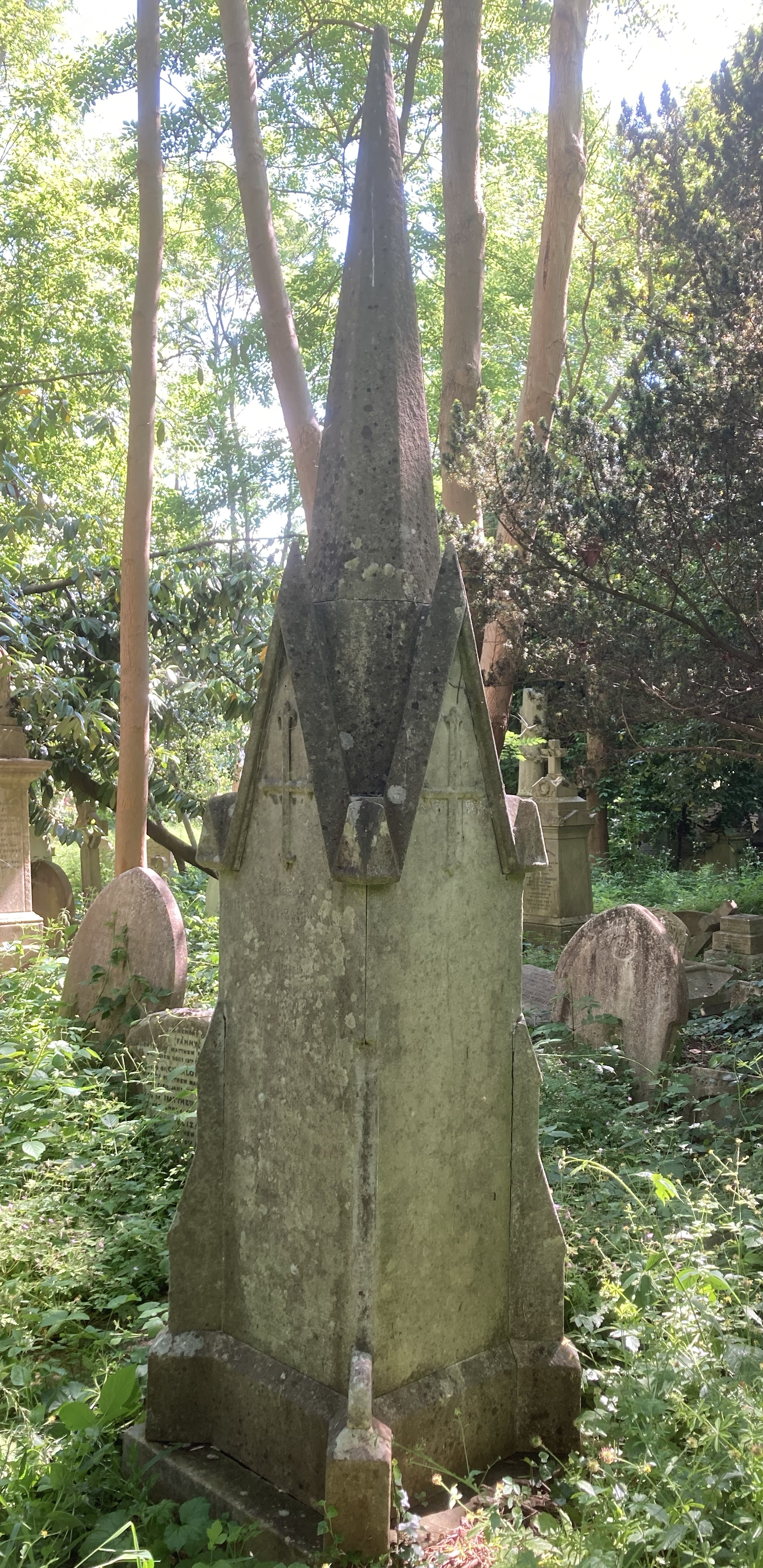
Grave of Sir Charles Cowper in Highgate Cemetery

In the December 1869 election, he recontested East Sydney unsuccessfully, but was elected to represent Liverpool Plains.

== Death ==
He is buried in a family grave on the western side of Highgate Cemetery.

== Honours ==
Cowper was made a Companion of the Order of St Michael and St George (CMG) in 1869, and a Knight Commander of the Order of St Michael and St George (KCMG) in 1872.

The federal Division of Cowper in New South Wales was created in 1900, and named after Sir Charles Cowper.

== Notes ==
Political offices
Preceded by Stuart Donaldson	Premier of New South Wales (first term); 1856	Succeeded by Henry Parker
Preceded by Henry Parker	Premier of New South Wales (second term); 1857–1859	Succeeded by William Forster
Preceded by John Robertson	Premier of New South Wales (third term); 1861–1863	Succeeded by James Martin
Preceded by James Martin	Premier of New South Wales (fourth term); 1865–1866	Succeeded by James Martin
Preceded by John Robertson	Premier of New South Wales (fifth term); 1870	Succeeded by James Martin
Diplomatic posts
Preceded by William Mayne	Agent-General for New South Wales; 1871 – 1876	Succeeded by William Forster
