= Members of the New South Wales Legislative Assembly, 1858–1859 =

Members of the New South Wales Legislative Assembly who served in the second parliament of New South Wales held their seats from 1858 to 1859. The Speaker was Sir Daniel Cooper.

Name	Electorate	Years in office
Andrew Aldcorn	St Vincent	1858–1859
William Arnold	Durham	1856–1875
Richard Bowker	North Eastern Boroughs	1858–1859, 1877–1880
Henry Buckley	Stanley County	1856–1859
James Byrnes	Parramatta	1857–1861, 1864–1872
John Campbell	Sydney Hamlets	1856–1860
Robert Campbell	Sydney City	1856–1859
Sir Daniel Cooper	Sydney Hamlets	1856–1860
Charles Cowper	Sydney City	1856–1859, 1860–1867, 1869–1870
George Cox	Wellington (County)	1856–1859
Benjamin Cribb	Stanley Boroughs	1858–1859
William Dalley	Cumberland Boroughs	1856–1857, 1858–1860, 1862–1864
Daniel Deniehy	Argyle	1857–1859, 1860
James Dickson	Northumberland Boroughs	1857–1859, 1859–1863
Stuart Donaldson	Cumberland (South Riding)	1856, 1856–1859
Daniel Egan	Maneroo	1856–1869, 1870
Peter Faucett	King and Georgiana	1856–1859, 1860, 1861–1865
Edward Flood	Cumberland (South Riding)	1856–1860, 1869–1872
William Forster	United Counties of Murray and St Vincent	1856–1860, 1861–1864, 1864–1869, 1869–1874, 1875–1876, 1880–1882
Samuel Gordon	Durham	1856–1859, 1859–1860
John Hargrave (Note: East Camden MLA Robert Owen resigned on 3 March 1859 to take a seat on a District Court. The resulting by-election on 21 March 1859 was won by John Hargrave.)	East Camden	1859
James Hart (Note: New England and Macleay MLA Abram Moriarty resigned on 13 October 1858. The resulting by-election on 14 December 1858 was won by James Hart.)	New England and Macleay	1858–1869, 1870–1872
John Hay	Murrumbidgee	1856–1867
Arthur Hodgson	Clarence and Darling Downs	1858–1860
Robert Jamison	Cook and Westmoreland	1856–1860
Richard Jenkins	Liverpool Plains and Gwydir	1858–1860
Richard Jones	Durham	1856–1860
William Lee	Roxburgh	1856–1859
Edward Lloyd	Liverpool Plains and Gwydir	1858–1859
George Lord	Wellington and Bligh	1856–1877
James Macarthur	West Camden	1856, 1856–1859
George Macleay	Murrumbidgee	1856–1859
William Macleay	Lachlan and Lower Darling	1856–1874
John Marks	East Camden	1856–1859
James Martin	Cook and Westmoreland	1856–1860, 1862–1863, 1863–1864, 1864–1872, 1872–1873
Abram Moriarty	New England and Macleay	1858
Terence Murray	Southern Boroughs	1856–1862
George Oakes	Parramatta	1856–1860, 1872–1874
Robert Owen	East Camden	1858–1859
Henry Parkes (Note: Cumberland (North Riding) MLA Henry Parkes resigned on 28 August 1858 due to financial difficulties. The resulting by-election on 20 September 1858 was won by John Plunkett.)	Cumberland (North Riding)	1856, 1858, 1859–1861, 1864–1870, 1870, 1872–1877, 1877–1882, 1882–1884, 1885–1887, 1887–1895
John Paterson	Lachlan and Lower Darling	1858–1859
William Piddington	Northumberland and Hunter	1856–1877
John Plunkett	Cumberland (North Riding)	1856–1857, 1858–1860
John Richardson	Stanley Boroughs	1856–1859
John Robertson	Phillip, Brisbane and Bligh	1856–1861, 1862–1865, 1865–1866, 1866–1870, 1870–1877, 1877–1878, 1882–1886
Henry Rotton	Western Boroughs	1858–1859, 1859–1860, 1860–1864
Alexander Scott	Northumberland and Hunter	1856–1860, 1860–1861
Thomas Smith	Cumberland (North Riding)	1857–1859
William Suttor	Bathurst County	1856–1859, 1860–1864, 1866–1872
William Taylor	New England and Macleay	1858–1859
George Thornton	Sydney City	1858–1859, 1867–1868
Robert Tooth	Sydney City	1858–1859
William Tooth	Moreton, Wide Bay, Burnett and Maranoa	1858–1859
Elias Weekes	Northumberland Boroughs	1856–1864
George White	Northumberland and Hunter	1858–1859
William Wild	West Camden	1858–1860
James Williamson	Gloucester and Macquarie	1858–1859

== See also ==
- Second Cowper ministry
- Results of the 1858 New South Wales colonial election
- Candidates of the 1858 New South Wales colonial election

== Notes ==
There was no party system in New South Wales politics until 1887. Under the constitution, ministers were required to resign to recontest their seats in a by-election when appointed. These by-elections are only noted when the minister was defeated; in general, he was elected unopposed.
