= Candidates of the 1858 New South Wales colonial election =

This is a list of candidates for the 1858 New South Wales colonial election. The election was held from 13 January to 12 February 1858.

There was no recognisable party structure at this election.

== Retiring Members ==
- James Garland MLA (Lachlan and Lower Darling)
- Richard Hargrave MLA (New England and Macleay)
- Hovenden Hely MLA (Northumberland and Hunter)
- Gideon Lang MLA (Liverpool Plains and Gwydir)
- Patrick Leslie MLA (Moreton, Wide Bay, Burnett and Maranoa)
- Henry Parker MLA (Parramatta)
- Francis Rusden MLA (Liverpool Plains and Gwydir)
- James Thompson MLA (St Vincent)

== Legislative Assembly ==
Sitting members are shown in bold text. Successful candidates are highlighted.

Electorates are arranged chronologically from the day the poll was held. Because of the sequence of polling, some sitting members who were defeated in their constituencies were then able to contest other constituencies later in the polling period. On the second occasion, these members are shown in italic text.

Electorate	Successful candidates	Unsuccessful candidates
Wednesday 13 January 1858
Sydney Hamlets	**John Campbell**; **Daniel Cooper**	Robert Tooth
Friday 15 January 1858
Sydney City	**Robert Campbell**; **Charles Cowper**; George Thornton; Robert Tooth	William Allen; **William Dalley**; Frank Fowler; **James Wilshire**
Tuesday 19 January 1858
Parramatta	**James Byrnes**; **George Oakes**	**James Pye**
Thursday 21 January 1858
West Camden	**James Macarthur**; William Wild	**John Oxley**
Friday 22 January 1858
Cumberland Boroughs	William Dalley	**William Bowman**; William Redman
East Camden	**John Marks**; Robert Owen	George Alley; **Henry Osborne**
Saturday 23 January 1858
Argyle	**Daniel Deniehy**	
Monday 25 January 1858
Bathurst County	**William Suttor**	
Tuesday 26 January 1858
North Eastern Boroughs	Richard Bowker	
St Vincent	Andrew Aldcorn	
Wednesday 27 January 1858
Cook and Westmoreland	**Robert Jamison**; **James Martin**	
Thursday 28 January 1858
Cumberland (North Riding)	Henry Parkes; **Thomas Smith**	Richard Hill
Northumberland Boroughs	**James Dickson**; **Elias Weekes**	
Southern Boroughs	**Terence Murray**	John Hardy
Western Boroughs	Henry Rotton	**Arthur Holroyd**
Saturday 30 January 1858
Cumberland (South Riding)	**Stuart Donaldson**; **Edward Flood**	**Thomas Holt**; George Smith
Northumberland and Hunter	**William Piddington**; **Alexander Scott**; George White	**Clark Irving**
Monday 1 February 1858
Stanley Boroughs	Benjamin Cribb; **John Richardson**	Edward Browne
Tuesday 2 February 1858
Roxburgh	**William Lee**	
Friday 5 February 1858
Durham	**William Arnold**; **Samuel Gordon**; **Richard Jones**	Edward Hargraves
Maneroo	**Daniel Egan**	George Hebden
Murray	**William Forster**	N S Powell
Wellington County	**George Cox**	
Monday 8 February 1858
King and Georgiana	**Peter Faucett**	
Stanley County	**Henry Buckley**	
Tuesday 9 February 1858
Murrumbidgee	**John Hay**; **George Macleay**	Eugene Owen
Wednesday 10 February 1858
Gloucester and Macquarie	James Williamson	**Thomas Barker**
Liverpool Plains and Gwydir	Richard Jenkins; Edward Lloyd	William Pennington
Wellington and Bligh	**George Lord**	
Thursday 11 February 1858
Lachlan and Lower Darling	**William Macleay**; John Paterson	Edward Flood; John Piper Egan
New England and Macleay	Abram Moriarty; William Taylor	**Thomas Rusden**
Phillip, Brisbane and Bligh	**John Robertson**	
Friday 12 February 1858
Clarence and Darling Downs	Arthur Hodgson	
Moreton, Wide Bay, Burnett and Maranoa	William Tooth	Arthur Macalister

== See also ==
- Members of the New South Wales Legislative Assembly, 1858–1859
