= Members of the New South Wales Legislative Council, 1877–1880 =

Members of the New South Wales Legislative Council who served from 1877 to 1880 were appointed for life by the Governor on the advice of the Premier. This list includes members between the elections commencing on 24 October 1877 and the elections commencing on 17 November 1880. The President was Sir John Hay.

Name	Years in office	Office
George Allen (Note: George Allen died on 3 November 1877.)	1856–1861, 1861–1877	
Archibald Bell (Note: 6 members were appointed on 7 October 1879, and took their seats on 28 October 1879.)	1879–1883	
John Blaxland	1863–1884	
William Busby	1867–1887	
Edward Butler (Note: Edward Butler was appointed on 29 October 1877, took his seat on 5 December 1877 and died on 9 August 1879.)	1861–1863, 1877–1879	
William Byrnes	1858–1861, 1861–1891	
Alexander Campbell	1864–1890	
Charles Campbell	1870–1888	
John Campbell	1856, 1861–1886	
James Chisholm	1865–1888	
Edward Cox	1874–1883	
George Cox	1863–1901	
William Dalley (Note: William Dalley resigned on 8 April 1880.)	1870–1873, 1875–1880, 1883–1888	
Frederick Darley	1868–1886	
Leopold De Salis	1874–1898	
Joseph Docker	1856–1861, 1863–1884	
Edward Flood	1879–1888	
William Foster (Note: William Foster was appointed on 18 December 1877, took his seat on 23 January 1878 and resigned on 28 October 1880.)	1878–1880	Attorney General (18 December 1877 − 20 December 1878)
John Frazer	1874–1884	
Samuel Gordon	1861–1882	
William Grahame	1875–1889	
Sir John Hay	1867–1892	President
Thomas Holt	1868–1883	
Sir Joseph Innes	1873–1881	Chairman of Committees (9 February 1875 − 16 December 1880); Minister of Justice (11 August 1880 − 13 October 1881)
Francis Lord	1856–1861, 1864–1893	
George Lord (Note: George Lord was appointed on 29 October 1877, took his seat on 28 November 1877 and died on 9 May 1880.)	1877–1880	
Sir William Macarthur	1864–1882	
William Macleay (Note: William Macleay and George Thornton were appointed on 29 October 1877, and took their seats on 27 November 1877.)	1877–1891	
John Marks (Note: John Marks was appointed on 14 January 1878, and took his seat on 23 January 1878.)	1878–1885	Representative of the Government and Vice-President of the Executive Council (14 January 1877 − 20 December 1878)
Henry Moore	1868–1888	
James Norton	1879–1906	
George Oakes	1879–1881	
Edward Ogilvie	1863–1889	
Robert Owen (Note: Robert Owen died on 25 November 1878.)	1868–1878	
William Piddington	1879–1887	
John Richardson	1868–1887	
Sir John Robertson (Note: Sir John Robertson was appointed on 21 December 1878, and took his seat on 22 January 1879.)	1861, 1861, 1879–1881	Representative of the Government and Vice-President of the Executive Council (21 December 1878 − 10 November 1881); Minister of Public Instruction (1 May 1880 − 10 November 1881)
Bourn Russell (Note: Bourn Russell died on 4 July 1880.)	1858–1861, 1861–1880	
Saul Samuel (Note: Saul Samuel resigned on 16 August 1880 after being appointed Agent-General for New South Wales in London.)	1872–1880	Postmaster-General (21 December 1878 − 10 August 1880)
Thomas Smart	1870–1881	
John Smith	1874–1885	
Sir Alfred Stephen (Note: Sir Alfred Stephen resigned on 20 March 1879 to become acting Governor of New South Wales and was re-appointed on 8 August 1879, taking his seat on 28 October 1879.)	1856–1858, 1875–1879, 1879–1885, 1886–1890	
John Stewart	1879–1895	
Sir Edward Deas Thomson (Note: Sir Edward Deas Thomson died on 16 July 1879.)	1856–1861, 1861–1879	
George Thornton	1877–1901	
John Watt	1861–1866, 1874–1890	
Elias Weekes	1865–1880	
James White	1874–1890	

== See also ==
- Farnell ministry
- Third Parkes ministry
