= Results of the 1858 New South Wales colonial election =

Colonial election for New South Wales, Australia in 1858

The 1858 New South Wales colonial election was to return 54 members of Legislative Assembly composed of 34 electoral districts with 18 returning 1 member, 13 returning 2 members, two returning 3 members and one returning 4 members, all with a first past the post system. In multi-member districts, because each voter could cast more than one vote, it is not possible to total the votes to show the number of voters and voter turnout in these districts is estimated. 17 members from 14 districts were returned unopposed. The electoral districts and boundaries were established under the Electoral Act 1851 (NSW) for the former Legislative Council.

New South Wales colonial election, 13 January 1858 – 12 February 1858 Legislative Assembly << 1856–1859 >>
Enrolled voters					
Votes cast	38,924		Turnout	43.09	−5.42
Informal votes	0		Informal	0.00	+0.00
Summary of votes by party
Party	Primary votes	%	Swing	Seats	Change
Total	38,924			54	

== Results by district ==
=== Argyle ===
1858 New South Wales colonial election: Argyle 23 January
Candidate	Votes	%
Daniel Deniehy (re-elected)	unopposed	

=== Bathurst (County) ===
1858 New South Wales colonial election: Bathurst (County) 25 January
Candidate	Votes	%
William Suttor (re-elected)	unopposed	

=== Clarence and Darling Downs ===
1858 New South Wales colonial election: Clarence and Darling Downs 12 February
Candidate	Votes	%
Arthur Hodgson (elected)	unopposed	

The sitting member Clark Irving unsuccessfully contested Northumberland and Hunter.

=== Cook and Westmoreland ===
1858 New South Wales colonial election: Cook and Westmoreland 27 January
Candidate	Votes	%
James Martin (re-elected)	unopposed	
Robert Jamison (re-elected)	unopposed	

=== Cumberland Boroughs ===
1858 New South Wales colonial election: Cumberland Boroughs 22 January
Candidate	Votes	%
William Dalley (elected)	246	52.1
William Bowman (defeated)	168	35.6
William Redman	58	12.3
Total formal votes	472	100.0
Informal votes	0	0
Turnout	472	65.7

William Dalley had been defeated as a sitting member for Sydney City.

=== Cumberland (North Riding) ===
1858 New South Wales colonial election: Cumberland (North Riding) 28 January
Candidate	Votes	%
Thomas Smith (re-elected 1)	716	36.6
Henry Parkes (elected 2)	633	32.4
Richard Hill	606	31.0
Total formal votes	1,955	100.0
Informal votes	0	0
Turnout	1,955	43.8

The sitting member James Pye unsuccessfully contested Parramatta.

=== Cumberland (South Riding) ===
1858 New South Wales colonial election: Cumberland (South Riding) 30 January
Candidate	Votes	%
Edward Flood (re-elected 1)	1,271	42.3
Stuart Donaldson (re-elected 2)	955	31.8
Thomas Holt (defeated)	778	25.9
George Smith	0	0.0
Total formal votes	3,004	100.0
Informal votes	0	0.0
Turnout	3,004	41.3

The other sitting member James Byrnes successfully contested Parramatta. Edward Flood was a sitting member for North Eastern Boroughs. Thomas Holt was the sitting member for Stanley Boroughs. There was some debate as to whether George Smith had received no votes, with Stuart Donaldson stating that he had seen one vote while Edward Flood said he had seen several.

=== Durham ===
1858 New South Wales colonial election: Durham 5 February
Candidate	Votes	%
Samuel Gordon (re-elected 1)	416	33.0
William Arnold (re-elected 2)	408	32.4
Richard Jones (re-elected 3)	355	28.2
Edward Hargraves	79	6.3
Total formal votes	1,258	100.0
Informal votes	0	0.0
Turnout	1,258	28.8

=== Eastern Division of Camden ===
1858 New South Wales colonial election: Eastern Division of Camden 22 January
Candidate	Votes	%
John Marks (re-elected 1)	789	35.4
Robert Owen (elected 2)	768	34.5
Henry Osborne (defeated)	632	28.4
George Alley	39	1.8
Total formal votes	2,228	100.0
Informal votes	0	0.0
Turnout	2,228	68.0

=== Gloucester and Macquarie ===
1858 New South Wales colonial election: Gloucester and Macquarie 10 February
Candidate	Votes	%
James Williamson (elected)	425	60.7
Thomas Barker (defeated)	275	39.3
Total formal votes	700	100.0
Informal votes	0	0.0
Turnout	700	62.3

=== King and Georgiana ===
1858 New South Wales colonial election: King and Georgiana 8 February
Candidate	Votes	%
Peter Faucett (re-elected)	unopposed	

=== Lachlan and Lower Darling ===
1858 New South Wales colonial election: Lachlan and Lower Darling 11 February
Candidate	Votes	%
William Macleay (re-elected)	show of hands	
John Paterson (elected)	show of hands	
Edward Flood		
John Egan		

The sitting member James Garland did not contest the election. The show of hands was in favour of William Macleay and John Paterson and while the supporters of Edward Flood and John Egan called for a poll, they did not have the six electors that were required. Edward Flood successfully contested Cumberland (South Riding).

=== Liverpool Plains and Gwydir ===
1858 New South Wales colonial election: Liverpool Plains and Gwydir 10 February
Candidate	Votes	%
Edward Lloyd (elected 1)	242	47.9
Richard Jenkins (elected 2)	228	45.2
W G Pennington	35	6.9
Total formal votes	505	100.0
Informal votes	0	0.0
Turnout	505	41.7

The sitting members Gideon Lang and Francis Rusden did not contest the election.

=== Maneroo ===
1858 New South Wales colonial election: Maneroo 5 February
Candidate	Votes	%
Daniel Egan (re-elected)	196	68.3
George Hebden	91	31.7
Total formal votes	287	100.0
Informal votes	0	0.0
Turnout	287	60.8

=== Moreton, Wide Bay, Burnett, Maranoa, Leichhardt and Port Curtis ===
1858 New South Wales colonial election: Moreton, Wide Bay, Burnett, Maranoa, Leichhardt and Port Curtis 12 February
Candidate	Votes	%
William Tooth (elected)	56	51.9
Arthur Macalister	52	48.2
Total formal votes	108	100.0
Informal votes	0	0.0
Turnout	108	39.3

The sitting member Patrick Leslie did not contest the election. The returning officer stated that the lack of a mail service to northern parts of the district, being Gladstone, Rannes and Surat meant that no polling had occurred in those places. The Legislative Assembly directed him to return the writ. William Tooth was subsequently proclaimed to have been elected, and Tooth was sworn in on 22 June 1858.

=== Murrumbidgee ===
1858 New South Wales colonial election: Murrumbidgee 9 February
Candidate	Votes	%
George Macleay (re-elected 1)	432	45.7
John Hay (re-elected 2)	407	42.8
Eugene Owen	111	11.7
Total formal votes	950	100.0
Informal votes	0	0.0
Turnout	950	53.4

=== New England and Macleay ===
1858 New South Wales colonial election: New England and Macleay 11 February
Candidate	Votes	%
Abram Moriarty (elected 1)	179	42.4
William Taylor (elected 2)	136	32.2
Thomas Rusden (defeated)	107	25.4
Total formal votes	422	100.0
Informal votes	0	0.0
Turnout	422	35.52

The former member Thomas Rusden unsuccessfully petitioned against the election of Moriaty.

=== North Eastern Boroughs ===
1858 New South Wales colonial election: North Eastern Boroughs 26 January 1858
Candidate	Votes	%
Richard Bowker	unopposed	

The sitting member Edward Flood successfully contested Cumberland (South Riding).

=== Northumberland and Hunter ===
1858 New South Wales colonial election: Northumberland and Hunter 30 January
Candidate	Votes	%
Alexander Scott (re-elected 1)	1,040	30.5
George White (elected 2)	969	28.4
William Piddington (re-elected 3)	945	27.7
Clark Irving (defeated)	457	13.40
Total formal votes	3,411	100.0
Informal votes	0	0.0
Turnout	3,411	38.0

The other sitting member Hovenden Hely did not contest the election. Clark Irving was the member for Clarence and Darling Downs.

=== Northumberland Boroughs ===
1858 New South Wales colonial election: Northumberland Boroughs Wednesday 27 January
Candidate	Votes	%
James Dickson (re-elected)	unopposed	
Elias Weekes (re-elected)	unopposed	

=== Parramatta ===
1858 New South Wales colonial election: Parramatta 19 January
Candidate	Votes	%
George Oakes (re-elected 1)	333	38.0
James Byrnes (re-elected 2)	326	37.2
James Pye	218	24.9
Total formal votes	877	100.0
Informal votes	0	0.0
Turnout	877	54.5

The other sitting member Henry Parker did not contest the election. James Byrnes was the member for Cumberland (South Riding). James Pye petitioned against the election alleging his supporters had been intimidated from voting, however this was dismissed as unproven.

=== Phillip, Brisbane and Bligh ===
1858 New South Wales colonial election: Phillip, Brisbane and Bligh 11 February
Candidate	Votes	%
John Robertson (re-elected)	unopposed	

=== Roxburgh ===
1858 New South Wales colonial election: Roxburgh 2 February
Candidate	Votes	%
William Lee (re-elected)	unopposed	

=== St Vincent ===
1858 New South Wales colonial election: St Vincent 26 January
Candidate	Votes	%
Andrew Aldcorn (elected)	unopposed	

The sitting member James Thompson did not contest the election.

=== Southern Boroughs ===
1858 New South Wales colonial election: Southern Boroughs 28 January
Candidate	Votes	%
Terrence Murray (re-elected)	204	56.2
John Hardy	159	43.8
Total formal votes	363	100.0
Informal votes	0	0.0
Turnout	363	62.37

=== Stanley Boroughs ===
1858 New South Wales colonial election: Stanley Boroughs 1 February 1858
Candidate	Votes	%
Benjamin Cribb (elected 1)	492	43.7
John Richardson (re-elected 2)	481	42.7
Edward Browne	153	13.6
Total formal votes	1,126	100.0
Informal votes	0	0.0
Turnout	1,126	37.3

The sitting member Thomas Holt unsuccessfully contested Cumberland (South Riding).

=== Stanley County ===
1858 New South Wales colonial election: Stanley County 8 February
Candidate	Votes	%
Henry Buckley (re-elected)	unopposed	

=== Sydney City ===
1858 New South Wales colonial election: Sydney City 15 January
Candidate	Votes	%
George Thornton (elected 1)	3,666	21.4
Robert Tooth (elected 2)	2,411	14.1
Robert Campbell (re-elected 3)	2,158	12.6
Charles Cowper (re-elected 4)	2,099	12.2
William Dalley (defeated)	2,035	11.9
Frank Fowler	1,762	10.3
James Wilshire (defeated)	1,557	18.7
William Allen	1,474	8.6
Total formal votes	17,164	100.0
Informal votes	0	0.0
Turnout	17,164	39.7

Robert Tooth had unsuccessfully contested Sydney Hamlets.

=== Sydney Hamlets ===
1858 New South Wales colonial election: Sydney Hamlets 13 January
Candidate	Votes	%
John Campbell (re-elected 1)	891	35.1
Sir Daniel Cooper (re-elected 2)	876	34.5
Robert Tooth	773	30.4
Total formal votes	2,540	100.0
Informal votes	0	0.0
Turnout	2,540	34.4

=== United Counties of Murray and St Vincent ===
1858 New South Wales colonial election: United Counties of Murray and St Vincent 5 February
Candidate	Votes	%
William Forster (re-elected)	115	61.2
N S Powell	73	38.8
Total formal votes	188	100.0
Informal votes	0	0.0
Turnout	188	56.8

=== Wellington and Bligh ===
1858 New South Wales colonial election: Wellington and Bligh 10 February
Candidate	Votes	%
George Lord (re-elected)	unopposed	

=== Wellington (County) ===
1858 New South Wales colonial election: Wellington (County) 5 February 1858
Candidate	Votes	%
George Cox (re-elected)	unopposed	

=== Western Boroughs ===
1858 New South Wales colonial election: Western Boroughs 28 January
Candidate	Votes	%
Henry Rotton (re-elected)	230	50.7
Arthur Holroyd (defeated)	224	49.3
Total formal votes	454	100.0
Informal votes	0	0.0
Turnout	454	48.3

=== Western Division of Camden ===
1858 New South Wales colonial election: Western Division of Camden 21 January
Candidate	Votes	%
James Macarthur (re-elected 1)	366	40.1
William Wild (elected 2)	358	39.3
John Oxley (defeated)	188	20.6
Total formal votes	912	100.0
Informal votes	0	0.0
Turnout	912	53.5

== See also ==
- Members of the New South Wales Legislative Assembly, 1858–1859
- Candidates of the 1858 New South Wales colonial election
