= Electoral results for the district of Eastern Division of Camden =

Election results for East Camden, New South Wales, Australia

Eastern Division of Camden, an electoral district of the Legislative Assembly in the Australian state of New South Wales was created in 1856 and abolished in 1859.

== Members ==
Election	Member	Party	Member	Party
1856	John Marks	None	Henry Osborne	None
1858	John Marks	None	Robert Owen	None
1859 by	John Marks	None	John Hargrave	None

== Election results ==
=== Elections in the 1850s ===
==== 1859 by-election ====
Eastern Division of Camden by-election Monday 21 March
Candidate	Votes	%
John Hargrave (elected)	638	99.7
John Tighe	2	0.3
Total formal votes	640	100.0
Informal votes	0	0
Turnout	640	39.1 (Note: estimate based on an electoral roll of 1,638 at the January 1858 election.)

Robert Owen's seat was declared vacant on his acceptance of an appointment as a judge of the District Court, filling the position created by the resignation of John Hargrave.

==== 1858 ====
1858 New South Wales colonial election: Eastern Division of Camden 22 January
Candidate	Votes	%
John Marks (re-elected 1)	789	35.4
Robert Owen (elected 2)	768	34.5
Henry Osborne (defeated)	632	28.4
George Alley	39	1.8
Total formal votes	2,228	100.0
Informal votes	0	0.0
Turnout	2,228	68.0

==== 1856 ====
1856 New South Wales colonial election: Eastern Division of Camden
Candidate	Votes	%
Henry Osborne (elected 1)	657	33.5
John Marks (elected 2)	502	25.6
Charles Jenkins	398	20.3
George Pickering	176	9.0
David L. Waugh	136	7.0
James Shoobert	91	4.6
Total formal votes	1,960	100.0
Informal votes	0	0.0
Turnout	980	66.3

Polling was conducted on 31 March 1856. Osborne had represented this district in the old Legislative Council.
