= 1859 East Camden colonial by-election =

By-election in New South Wales, Australia

A by-election was held for the New South Wales Legislative Assembly electorate of Eastern Division of Camden on 15 March 1859 because Robert Owen's seat was declared vacant on his acceptance of an appointment as a judge of the District Court, filling the position created by the resignation of John Hargrave. The Illawarra Mercury reported that the nomination of John Tighe was intended to cause one week's delay before Hargrave could take his seat.

== Dates ==
Date	Event
3 March 1859	Robert Owen's seat declared vacant.
5 March 1859	Writ of election issued by the Speaker of the Legislative Assembly.
15 March 1859	Nominations
21 March 1859	Polling day
26 March 1859	Return of writ

== Result ==
Eastern Division of Camden by-election Monday 21 March
Candidate	Votes	%
John Hargrave (elected)	638	99.7
John Tighe	2	0.3
Total formal votes	640	100.0
Informal votes	0	0
Turnout	640	39.1 (Note: estimate based on an electoral roll of 1,638 at the January 1858 election.)

== See also ==
- Electoral results for the district of Eastern Division of Camden
- List of New South Wales state by-elections
