= Leader of the Government in the Legislative Council (New South Wales) =

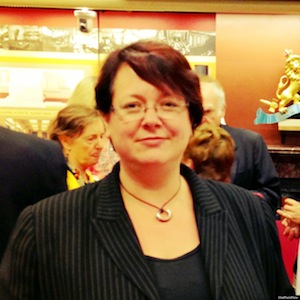
- Incumbent; Penny Sharpe since 28 March 2023
- Style: The Honourable
- Appointer: Governor of New South Wales
- Inaugural holder: William Mayne (as the Representative of the Government in the Legislative Council)
- Formation: 6 June 1856
- Deputy: John Graham

The Leader of the Government in the Legislative Council, known before 1 July 1966 as Representative of the Government in the Legislative Council, is an office held in New South Wales by the most senior minister in the New South Wales Legislative Council, elected to lead the governing party (or parties) in the council. Though the leader in the Council does not have the power of the office of Premier, there are some parallels between the latter's status in the Legislative Assembly and the former's in the Council. This means that the leader has responsibility for all policy areas, acts as the government's principal spokesperson in the upper house and has priority in gaining recognition from the President of the Council to speak in debate.

Traditionally, but not always, the office has been held with the sinecure office of Vice-President of the Executive Council. The current leader is Penny Sharpe since 28 March 2023. The leader is assisted by a Deputy Leader of the Government in the Legislative Council, John Graham.

== List of leaders ==
=== Leaders ===
| Title | Leader | Party | Term start | Term end | Time in office | Notes |
|---|---|---|---|---|---|---|
| Representative of the Government | William Mayne | None | 6 June 1856 | 25 August 1856 | 80 days | |
| Representative of the Government | Alfred Lutwyche | None | 12 September 1856 | 2 October 1856 | 20 days | |
| Representative of the Government | Edward Deas Thomson (Note: Vice-President of the Executive Council from 23 May 1857.) | None | 3 October 1856 | 7 September 1857 | 339 days | |
| Representative of the Government | Alfred Lutwyche | None | 19 November 1857 | 21 February 1859 | 1 year, 94 days | |
| Representative of the Government | Lyttleton Bayley | None | 23 February 1859 | 28 April 1859 | 64 days | |
| Representative of the Government | John Dickson | None | 30 August 1859 | 28 September 1859 | 29 days | |
| Representative of the Government | John Hargrave | None | 12 October 1859 | 26 October 1859 | 14 days | |
| Representative of the Government | Geoffrey Eagar | None | 27 October 1859 | 8 March 1860 | 133 days | |
| Representative of the Government | John Hargrave | None | 9 March 1860 | 15 October 1863 | 3 years, 220 days | |
| Representative of the Government | John Plunkett (Note: Vice-President of the Executive Council from 23 November 1863.) | None | 16 October 1863 | 2 February 1865 | 1 year, 109 days | |
| Representative of the Government | John Hargrave | None | 3 February 1865 | 21 January 1866 | 352 days | |
| Representative of the Government | Joseph Docker | None | 22 January 1866 | 26 October 1868 | 2 years, 278 days | |
| Representative of the Government | Robert Owen | None | 27 October 1868 | 1 August 1870 | 1 year, 278 days | |
| Representative of the Government | Julian Salomons | None | 11 August 1870 | 15 December 1870 | 126 days | |
| Representative of the Government | Joseph Docker | None | 16 December 1870 | 13 May 1872 | 1 year, 149 days | |
| Representative of the Government | Saul Samuel (Note: Concurrently Vice-President of the Executive Council.) | None | 14 May 1872 | 13 September 1873 | 1 year, 122 days | |
| Representative of the Government | Joseph Innes | None | 13 September 1873 | 8 February 1875 | 1 year, 148 days | |
| Representative of the Government | Joseph Docker | None | 9 February 1875 | 21 March 1877 | 2 years, 40 days | |
| Representative of the Government | Saul Samuel | None | 22 March 1877 | 16 August 1877 | 147 days | |
| Representative of the Government | Joseph Docker | None | 17 August 1877 | 17 December 1877 | 122 days | |
| Representative of the Government | John Marks | None | 18 December 1877 | 20 December 1878 | 1 year, 2 days | |
| Representative of the Government | Sir John Robertson | None | 21 December 1878 | 10 November 1881 | 2 years, 324 days | |
| Representative of the Government | Frederick Darley | None | 14 November 1881 | 4 January 1883 | 1 year, 51 days | |
| Representative of the Government | William Dalley | None | 5 January 1883 | 6 October 1885 | 2 years, 274 days | |
| Representative of the Government | James Farnell | None | 7 October 1885 | 9 October 1885 | 2 days | |
| Representative of the Government | George Thornton | None | 13 November 1885 | 21 December 1885 | 38 days | |
| Representative of the Government | George Simpson | None | 22 December 1885 | 25 February 1886 | 65 days | |
| Representative of the Government | Charles Mackellar | None | 26 February 1886 | 23 December 1886 | 300 days | |
| Representative of the Government | John Burns | Free Trade | 21 January 1887 | 27 January 1887 | 6 days | |
| Representative of the Government | Julian Salomons | Free Trade | 7 March 1887 | 16 January 1889 | 1 year, 315 days | |
| Representative of the Government | Edmund Barton | Protectionist | 17 January 1889 | 7 March 1889 | 49 days | |
| Representative of the Government | William Suttor, Jr. | Free Trade | 8 March 1889 | 22 October 1891 | 2 years, 228 days | |
| Representative of the Government | Sir Julian Salomons | Protectionist | 23 October 1891 | 26 January 1893 | 1 year, 95 days | |
| Representative of the Government | Normand MacLaurin | Protectionist | 5 April 1893 | 2 August 1894 | 1 year, 119 days | |
| Representative of the Government | William Suttor, Jr. | Free Trade | 3 August 1894 | 15 March 1895 | 224 days | |
| Representative of the Government | Andrew Garran | Free Trade | 19 March 1895 | 18 November 1898 | 3 years, 244 days | |
| Representative of the Government | John Hughes | Free Trade | 22 November 1898 | 13 September 1899 | 295 days | |
| Representative of the Government | Kenneth Mackay | Protectionist | 14 September 1899 | 24 April 1900 | 222 days | |
| Representative of the Government | Francis Suttor | Protectionist | 12 June 1900 | 9 April 1901 | 2 years, 345 days | |
| Representative of the Government | Francis Suttor | Progressive | 28 March 1901 | 23 May 1903 | 2 years, 345 days | |
| Representative of the Government | Kenneth Mackay | Progressive | 6 June 1903 | 29 August 1904 | 1 year, 84 days | |
| Representative of the Government | John Hughes | Liberal Reform | 29 August 1904 | 20 October 1910 | 6 years, 52 days | |
| Representative of the Government | Fred Flowers | Labor | 21 October 1910 | 27 April 1915 | 4 years, 188 days | |
| Representative of the Government | John Fitzgerald | Labor | 27 April 1915 | 15 November 1916 | 3 years, 46 days | |
| Representative of the Government | John Fitzgerald | Nationalist | 15 November 1916 | 12 June 1918 | 3 years, 46 days | |
| Representative of the Government | John Garland | Nationalist | 12 June 1918 | 12 April 1920 | 1 year, 305 days | |
| Representative of the Government | Edward Kavanagh | Labor | 12 April 1920 | 20 December 1921 | 1 year, 252 days | |
| Representative of the Government | Sir Joseph Carruthers | Nationalist | 20 December 1921 | 20 December 1921 | 7 hours | |
| Representative of the Government | Edward Kavanagh | Labor | 20 December 1921 | 13 April 1922 | 114 days | |
| Representative of the Government | Sir Joseph Carruthers | Nationalist | 13 April 1922 | 17 June 1925 | 3 years, 65 days | |
| Representative of the Government | Albert Willis | Labor | 17 June 1925 | 18 October 1927 | 2 years, 123 days | |
| Representative of the Government | Francis Boyce | Nationalist | 18 October 1927 | 3 November 1930 | 3 years, 16 days | |
| Representative of the Government | Albert Willis | Labor | 4 November 1930 | 2 April 1931 | 149 days | |
| Representative of the Government | James Concannon | Labor | 3 April 1931 | 15 October 1931 | 1 year, 40 days | |
| Representative of the Government | James Concannon | Labor (NSW) | 15 October 1931 | 13 May 1932 | 1 year, 40 days | |
| Representative of the Government | James Ryan | United Australia | 16 May 1932 | 17 June 1932 | 32 days | |
| Representative of the Government | Henry Manning | United Australia | 18 June 1932 | 16 May 1941 | 8 years, 332 days | |
| Representative of the Government | Reg Downing | Labor | 16 May 1941 | 13 May 1965 | 23 years, 362 days | |
| Representative of the Government | Arthur Bridges | Liberal | 13 May 1965 | 30 June 1966 | 3 years, 9 days | |
| Leader of the Government | Arthur Bridges | Liberal | 1 July 1966 | 22 May 1968 | 3 years, 9 days | |
| Leader of the Government | Sir John Fuller | Country | 10 July 1968 | 14 May 1976 | 7 years, 309 days | |
| Leader of the Government | Paul Landa | Labor | 14 May 1976 | 5 April 1984 | 7 years, 327 days | |
| Leader of the Government | Barrie Unsworth | Labor | 5 April 1984 | 4 July 1986 | 2 years, 90 days | |
| Leader of the Government | Jack Hallam | Labor | 4 July 1986 | 25 March 1988 | 1 year, 265 days | |
| Leader of the Government | Ted Pickering | Liberal | 25 March 1988 | 22 October 1992 | 4 years, 214 days | |
| Leader of the Government | John Hannaford | Liberal | 22 October 1992 | 4 April 1995 | 2 years, 161 days | |
| Leader of the Government | Michael Egan | Labor | 4 April 1995 | 21 January 2005 | 9 years, 292 days | |
| Leader of the Government | John Della Bosca | Labor | 3 August 2005 | 13 June 2008 | 3 years, 144 days | |
| Leader of the Government | Michael Costa (acting) | Labor | 17 June 2008 | 8 September 2008 | 83 days | |
| Leader of the Government | John Della Bosca | Labor | 8 September 2008 | 1 September 2009 | 358 days | |
| Leader of the Government | Tony Kelly (acting) | Labor | 1 September 2009 | 22 September 2009 | 21 days | |
| Leader of the Government | John Hatzistergos | Labor | 22 September 2009 | 28 March 2011 | 1 year, 187 days | |
| Leader of the Government | Michael Gallacher | Liberal | 3 April 2011 | 2 May 2014 | 3 years, 29 days | |
| Leader of the Government | Duncan Gay | National | 6 May 2014 | 30 January 2017 | 2 years, 269 days | |
| Leader of the Government | Don Harwin | Liberal | 30 January 2017 | 15 April 2020 | 3 years, 76 days | |
| Leader of the Government | Damien Tudehope | Liberal | 15 April 2020 | 3 July 2020 | 79 days | |
| Leader of the Government | Don Harwin | Liberal | 3 July 2020 | 21 December 2021 | 1 year, 171 days | |
| Leader of the Government | Damien Tudehope | Liberal | 21 December 2021 | 17 February 2023 | 1 year, 58 days | |
| Leader of the Government | Penny Sharpe | Labor | 28 March 2023 | incumbent | 3 years, 163 days | |

=== Deputy Leaders ===
| Deputy Leader | Party | Term start | Term end | Time in office | Notes |
|---|---|---|---|---|---|
| John Fuller | Country | 1 July 1966 | 10 July 1968 | 2 years, 9 days | |
| Frederick Hewitt | Liberal | 3 September 1968 | 14 May 1976 | 7 years, 254 days | |
| Edna Roper | Labor | 14 May 1976 | 17 October 1978 | 2 years, 156 days | |
| Jack Hallam | Labor | 18 October 1978 | 4 July 1986 | 7 years, 260 days | |
| Deirdre Grusovin | Labor | 4 July 1986 | 25 March 1988 | 1 year, 265 days | |
| Bob Rowland Smith | National | 25 March 1988 | 11 June 1991 | 3 years, 78 days | |
| Robert Webster | National | 12 June 1991 | 4 April 1995 | 3 years, 296 days | |
| Ron Dyer | Labor | 4 April 1995 | 28 February 2003 | 7 years, 330 days | |
| John Della Bosca | Labor | 28 February 2003 | 3 August 2005 | 2 years, 156 days | |
| Michael Costa | Labor | 1 February 2005 | 5 September 2008 | 3 years, 33 days | |
| Tony Kelly | Labor | 7 September 2008 | 28 March 2011 | 2 years, 202 days | |
| Duncan Gay | National | 3 May 2011 | 6 May 2014 | 3 years, 3 days | |
| John Ajaka | Liberal | 6 May 2014 | 30 January 2017 | 2 years, 269 days | |
| Niall Blair | National | 30 January 2017 | 2 April 2019 | 2 years, 62 days | |
| Sarah Mitchell | National | 2 April 2019 | 28 March 2023 | 3 years, 360 days | |
| John Graham | Labor | 28 March 2023 | incumbent | 3 years, 163 days | |
