= Vice-President of the Executive Council (New South Wales) =

Minister in the Government of New South Wales

- Incumbent; Ron Hoenig since 5 April 2023
- Style: The Honourable
- Appointer: Governor of New South Wales
- Inaugural holder: Edward Deas Thomson
- Formation: 23 May 1857

The Vice-President of the Executive Council of New South Wales is a position in the Australian state of New South Wales governments, whose holder acts as presiding officer of the Executive Council of New South Wales in the absence of the Governor.

The vice-president of the Executive Council is appointed by the Governor on the advice of the Premier. The vice-president is usually a senior minister and may summon executive councillors and preside at Council meetings when the Governor is not present. However, the vice-president cannot sign Executive Council documents on behalf of the Governor. The current vice-president of the Executive Council is Ron Hoenig, since 5 April 2023.

== Duties and history ==
As the duties of the post are not rigorous, it is usually given to a government minister who holds another portfolio. In this sense, it is usually not a 'Minister without portfolio' such as the equivalent position, Lord President of the Council, is in the United Kingdom, although it has sometimes been used thus in the past, particularly in the pre-Federation period. Since 1920 it has typically been given to the Leader of the Government in the Legislative Council or its chief representative. However, following the 2023 New South Wales state election, the position was given to Ron Hoenig, who sits in the Legislative Assembly of New South Wales and is Leader of the House.

== Vice-presidents of the Executive Council ==
Ordinal	Vice-President	Party	Term start	Term end	Time in office	Notes
1	Edward Deas Thomson (Note: Concurrently Leader of the Government in the Legislative Council.)	None	23 May 1857	7 September 1857	107 days	
2	John Plunkett	None	23 November 1863	2 February 1865	1 year, 71 days	
3	Saul Samuel (Note: Saul Samuel was concurrently Representative of the Government in the Legislative Council from 14 May 1872 until 13 September 1873.)	None	14 May 1872	8 February 1875	2 years, 270 days	
4	Joseph Docker	None	17 August 1877	17 December 1877	122 days	
5	John Marks	None	18 December 1877	20 December 1878	1 year, 2 days	
6	Sir John Robertson	None	21 December 1878	10 November 1881	2 years, 324 days	
7	Frederick Darley	None	14 November 1881	4 January 1883	1 year, 51 days	
8	Sir Patrick Jennings	None	5 January 1883	31 July 1883	207 days	
9	Charles Mackellar	None	26 February 1886	23 December 1886	300 days	
10	Sir Henry Parkes MLA	Free Trade	20 January 1887	6 March 1887	45 days	
11	Julian Salomons	Free Trade	7 March 1887	16 January 1889	1 year, 315 days	
12	Sir John Lackey	Protectionist	17 January 1889	7 March 1889	49 days	
13	William Suttor Jr.	Free Trade	30 April 1889	22 October 1891	2 years, 175 days	
(11)	Sir Julian Salomons	Protectionist	23 October 1891	26 January 1893	1 year, 95 days	
14	Normand MacLaurin	Protectionist	5 April 1893	2 August 1894	1 year, 119 days	
(13)	William Suttor Jr.	Free Trade	7 August 1894	15 March 1895	220 days	
15	Andrew Garran	Free Trade	19 March 1895	18 November 1898	3 years, 244 days	
16	John Hughes	Free Trade	22 November 1898	13 September 1899	295 days	
17	William Lyne	Protectionist	14 September 1899	15 September 1899	1 day	
18	Kenneth Mackay	Protectionist	15 September 1899	24 April 1900	221 days	
19	Francis Suttor	Protectionist	12 June 1900	9 April 1901	301 days	
19	Francis Suttor	Progressive	9 April 1901	23 May 1903	2 years, 44 days	
(18)	Kenneth Mackay	Progressive	6 June 1903	29 August 1904	1 year, 84 days	
(16)	John Hughes	Liberal Reform	29 August 1904	20 October 1910	6 years, 52 days	
20	Fred Flowers	Labor	21 October 1910	27 April 1915	4 years, 188 days	
21	Jack FitzGerald	Labor	27 April 1915	15 November 1916	1 year, 202 days	
21	Jack FitzGerald	Nationalist	15 November 1916	30 July 1919	2 years, 257 days	
22	David Hall MLA	Nationalist	30 July 1919	9 February 1920	194 days	
23	Sir George Fuller MLA	Nationalist	9 February 1920	27 February 1920	18 days	
24	Edward Kavanagh	Labor	21 April 1920	20 December 1921	1 year, 243 days	
25	Sir Joseph Carruthers	Nationalist	20 December 1921 a.m.	20 December 1921 p.m.	7 hours	
(24)	Edward Kavanagh	Labor	20 December 1921	13 April 1922	114 days	
(25)	Sir Joseph Carruthers	Nationalist	13 April 1922	17 June 1925	3 years, 65 days	
26	Albert Willis	Labor	17 June 1925	18 October 1927	2 years, 123 days	
27	Francis Boyce	Nationalist	18 October 1927	3 November 1930	3 years, 16 days	
26	Albert Willis	Labor	4 November 1930	2 April 1931	149 days	
28	James Concannon	Labor	3 April 1931	15 October 1931	195 days	
28	James Concannon	Labor (NSW)	15 October 1931	13 May 1932	211 days	
29	James Ryan	United Australia	16 May 1932	17 June 1932	32 days	
30	Henry Manning	United Australia	18 June 1932	16 May 1941	8 years, 332 days	
31	Reg Downing	Labor	16 May 1941	13 May 1965	23 years, 362 days	
32	Arthur Bridges	Liberal	13 May 1965	22 May 1968	3 years, 9 days	
33	Sir John Fuller	Country	10 July 1968	14 May 1976	7 years, 309 days	
34	Paul Landa	Labor	14 May 1976	5 April 1984	7 years, 327 days	
35	Barrie Unsworth	Labor	5 April 1984	4 July 1986	2 years, 90 days	
36	Jack Hallam	Labor	4 July 1986	25 March 1988	1 year, 265 days	
37	Ted Pickering	Liberal	25 March 1988	22 October 1992	4 years, 211 days	
38	John Hannaford	Liberal	22 October 1992	4 April 1995	2 years, 164 days	
39	Michael Egan	Labor	4 April 1995	21 January 2005	9 years, 292 days	
40	John Della Bosca	Labor	3 August 2005	2 April 2007	1 year, 242 days	
41	Tony Kelly	Labor	2 April 2007	8 September 2008	1 year, 159 days	
(40)	John Della Bosca	Labor	8 September 2008	1 September 2009	358 days	
42	John Hatzistergos	Labor	1 September 2009	28 March 2011	1 year, 208 days	
43	Michael Gallacher	Liberal	3 April 2011	2 May 2014	3 years, 29 days	
44	Duncan Gay	National	6 May 2014	30 January 2017	2 years, 269 days	
45	Don Harwin	Liberal	30 January 2017	15 April 2020	3 years, 76 days	
46	Damien Tudehope	Liberal	15 April 2020	3 July 2020	79 days	
(45)	Don Harwin	Liberal	3 July 2020	21 December 2021	1 year, 171 days	
(46)	Damien Tudehope	Liberal	21 December 2021	17 February 2023	4 years, 261 days	
47	Sarah Mitchell	National	17 February 2023	28 March 2023	39 days	
48	Penny Sharpe	Labor	28 March 2023	5 April 2023	8 days	
49	Ron Hoenig (Note: Ron Hoenig sits in the Legislative Assembly of New South Wales as the MP for Heffron and is also the Leader of the House.)	Labor	5 April 2023	incumbent	3 years, 156 days	

Ministers are members of the Legislative Council unless otherwise noted.
