= Julian Salomons =

Australian politician (1835–1909)

Sir Julian Salomons KC
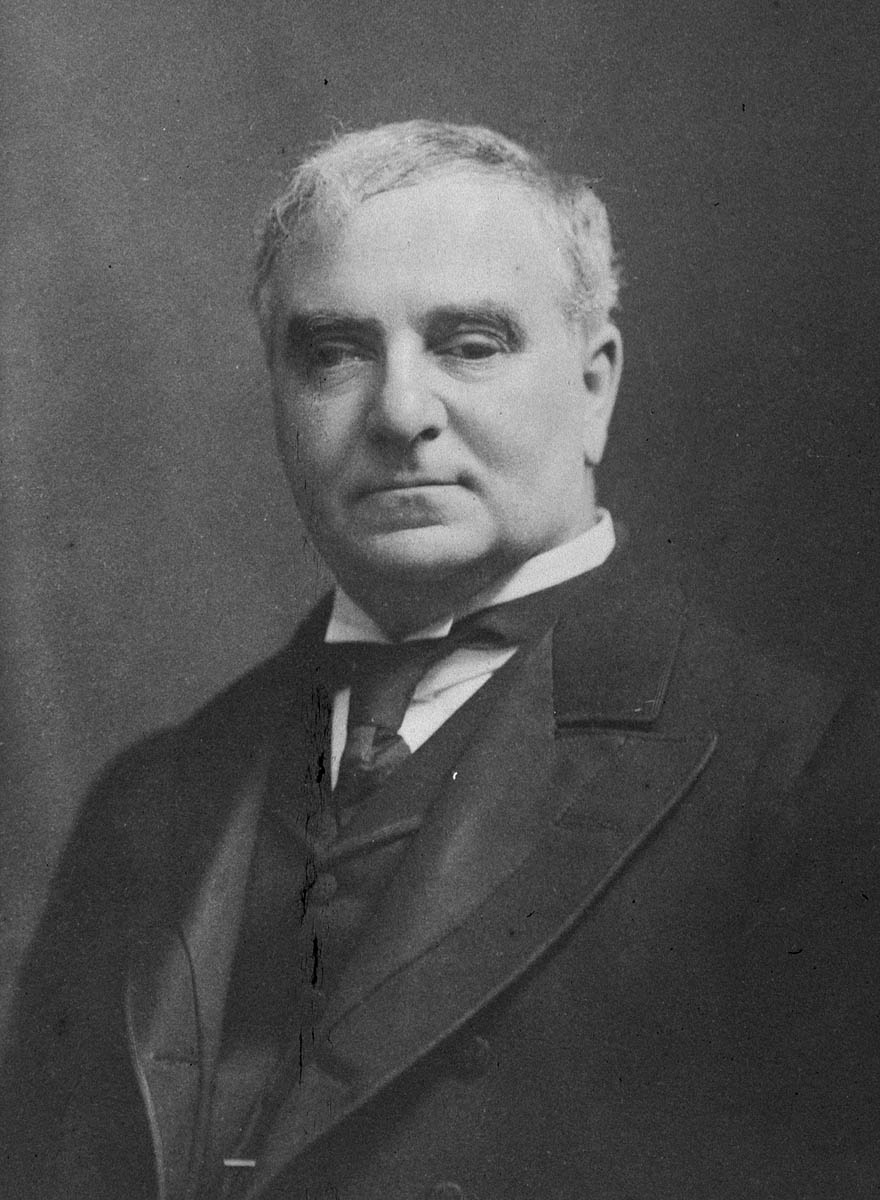
- Sir Julian Salomons

Chief Justice of New South Wales
- In office 12 November 1886 – 27 November 1886
- Preceded by: Sir James Martin
- Succeeded by: Sir Frederick Darley

Solicitor General
- In office 18 December 1869 – 15 December 1870
- Preceded by: Joshua Josephson
- Succeeded by: William Charles Windeyer

Personal details
- Born: Julian Emanuel Solomons; 4 November 1835 Edgbaston, Warwickshire, England
- Died: 6 April 1909 (aged 73) Woollahra, New South Wales, Australia

Sir Julian Emanuel Salomons (formerly Solomons) (4 November 1835 – 6 April 1909) was a British emigrant to New South Wales, where he was a barrister, royal commissioner, Solicitor General, Chief Justice and member of parliament. He was the only Chief Justice of New South Wales to be appointed and resign before he was ever sworn into office. Salomons was said to be short of stature and somewhat handicapped by defective eyesight. However, he had great industry, great powers of analysis, a keen intellect and unbounded energy and pertinacity. His wit and readiness were proverbial, and he was afraid of no judge.

== Early years ==
Salomons was born Julian Emanuel Solomons on 4 November 1835 at Edgbaston, Warwickshire in England, the only son of Emanuel Solomons, a merchant in Birmingham. He arrived in Sydney on 4 September 1853, aged 16 years, on board the Atalanta. He was employed as a stockbroker's clerk and as an assistant in a bookshop. In 1855 he was appointed the secretary of the Great Synagogue at Sydney.

After passing the preliminary examination of the Barristers Admission Board (now the Legal Profession Admission Board) in 1857, he returned to England in 1858 where he entered Gray's Inn and was called to the bar on 26 January 1861. He returned to Sydney and was admitted to the New South Wales Bar on 8 July 1861 and then returned to England to marry his cousin, Louisa Solomons, at Lower Edmonton, Middlesex, on 17 December 1862.

Salomons was Jewish and an active member of the Jewish community.

== Legal career ==
He returned to Sydney after his marriage and managed a successful practice as a barrister, where he first made a reputation in criminal cases. He had great industry, great powers of analysis, a keen intellect and unbounded energy and pertinacity. However, his passion for work probably led to a decline in his health and he made frequent trips to Europe to recover from bouts of illness.

One of the significant cases he was involved with was that of Louis Bertrand, who was sentenced to death on a charge of murder. Bertrand came to be known as the "Mad Dentist of Wynyard Square". Bertrand had tried to kill Henry Kinder, the husband of his mistress Ellen Kinder, on a number of occasions. Bertrand finally shot him, but his shot failed to kill. However, his actions persuaded his mistress to poison Kinder, and this was successful. In 1866 Bertrand was convicted of murder and sentenced to death. His mistress was discharged on account of a lack of evidence. Salomons was instructed after the trial and was able to persuade the Full Court of the Supreme Court of New South Wales that Bertrand should have a new trial. The decision was tied with two judges for a new trial and two judges against, but one judge subsequently retracted his judgment resulting in a win for Salomons. Rather bullishly, Salomons after winning the appeal went further to argue that the judge could not retract his judgment in law. Fortunately for his client, the court held that it could and the order for retrial stood. However, the court's decision for a new trial was subsequently overturned on appeal to the Privy Council on the basis that the Supreme Court could not make such an order. The Governor of New South Wales commuted Bertrand's sentence to imprisonment for life, serving 28 years. Salomons was appointed a Queen's Counsel in February 1881.

== Royal commissioner ==
In 1870 Salomons was a member of the Law Reform Commission, charged with making recommendations on updating and changing laws. On 16 August 1881 he was appointed a royal commissioner to inquire into the affairs of the Milburn Creek Copper Mining Co Ltd. Salomons reported on 3 November 1881 that 'there was an appropriation by the trustees themselves, not only without the consent or knowledge of their co-shareholders, but under circumstances of concealment and false statement, evidencing a consciousness on their part, that such appropriation was unauthorised and unjustifiable'. The report was to lead to Ezekiel Baker, a member of parliament and one of the trustees, being expelled from Parliament.

== First parliamentary career ==
Salomons unsuccessfully ran for parliament for the seat of East Sydney in December 1869. He was appointed Solicitor General on 18 December 1869 in the Second Robertson ministry, and a member of the Cabinet, despite not being a member of parliament. He continued in the role in the fifth Cowper ministry from January 1870. He was appointed as a member of the New South Wales Legislative Council, taking his seat on 11 August 1870 and becoming the Representative of the Government in the Legislative Council on the same day. The Cowper government fell in December 1870 and Salomons resigned from the council on 14 February 1871.

== Appointment as chief justice ==
Salomons' advocacy had earned him a huge reputation. When Chief Justice Sir James Martin died, the position was first offered to William Bede Dalley and then Frederick Matthew Darley. Both refused, and Salomons was then offered the position. After some hesitation, he accepted notwithstanding that it involved a substantial reduction in income. His appointment attracted controversy in some quarters and it was reputed that the other judges of the court were against his appointment. Biographer Percival Serle states that Salomons' response to criticism was that his "appointment appears to be so wholly unjustifiable [to Justice William Windeyer ] as to have led to the utterance by him of such expressions and opinions … as to make any intercourse in the future between him and me quite impossible". Serle states that each of the judges of the court denied making any such statements. He had general support from most newspapers and from the legal profession. Nevertheless, he decided on 19 November 1886 to resign the position before taking the oath of office. He was therefore gazetted as chief justice for only six days, having resigned twelve days after being offered the position.

== Second parliamentary career ==
He was appointed a second time as a member of the New South Wales Legislative Council on 7 March 1887, holding office for over 11 years until 20 February 1899. During that term, he was Vice-President of the Executive Council and Representative of the Government in the Legislative Council twice, both for nearly a year between 7 March 1887 and 16 January 1889 and then again between 23 October 1891 and 26 January 1893. He was knighted in 1891 during this second vice-presidency. It was during this second term that it is thought that Salomons gave the longest speech in the history of the council, when he spoke for approximately eight hours on the Federation Bill. His speech continued over two days, 28 and 29 July 1897. The Federation Bill was an important issue in the history of the colony of New South Wales as it led to the birth of the nation of Australia.

== Famous quotes ==
Salomons was reported to have an unusual talent for wit. After the federation of the Australian colonies, the newly established High Court of Australia was said to be routinely overturning decisions of the various Supreme Courts around Australia. Salomons suggested, after appearing before the Supreme Court, that the judges of the court should append the following to all Supreme Court judgments: "We are unanimously of the opinion that judgment ought to be entered for (let us say) the plaintiff, but to save the trouble and expense to the parties of an appeal to the High Court, we order judgment to be entered for the defendant."

On the question of Sir Samuel Griffith's English translation of Dante Alighieri which had received numerous unflattering reviews, it was reported that when Griffith presented a copy to Salomons, the latter asked Griffith to autograph the fly leaf, explaining that "I should not like anyone to think that I had borrowed the book, even less should I like anyone to think that I had bought it". Salomons was a supporter of religion being a moderator of human behaviour. He endowed a local public school on the basis that religion was taught as a subject and was upset when it was not. In an address on Australian Federation, he said that having an "education without religion is like putting a sword into the hands of a savage".

== Later life ==
Salomons was the Agent-General for New South Wales at London between 1899 and April 1900, returning to Sydney the following month. He was also appointed standing counsel for the Commonwealth government in New South Wales in 1903 and all but practically retired from legal practice in 1907. He made a few appearances in court after 1907. He was also a Trustee of the Art Gallery of New South Wales and a member of the Barristers Admission Board. He died after a short illness on 6 April 1909 of a cerebral haemorrhage in his home "Sherbourne" in Woollahra, Sydney. He was buried in the Hebrew portion of Rookwood cemetery in Sydney's west.

== See also ==
- List of judges of the Supreme Court of New South Wales

Legal offices
Preceded by Sir James Martin	Chief Justice of New South Wales; November 1886	Succeeded by Sir Frederick Darley
Political offices
Preceded by Joshua Josephson	Solicitor General; 1869 – 1870	Succeeded by William Windeyer
Preceded by Robert Owen	Representative of the Government in the Legislative Council; Aug – Dec 1870	Succeeded by Joseph Docker
Preceded by Sir Henry Parkes as Vice-President	Vice-President of the Executive Council; Representative of the Government in the Legislative Council; 1887 – 1889	Succeeded by Sir John Lackey as Vice-President
Preceded by John Burns as Representative in the Legislative Council	Vice-President of the Executive Council; Representative of the Government in the Legislative Council; 1887 – 1889	Succeeded by Edmund Barton as Representative in the Legislative Council
Preceded by William Suttor Jr.	Vice-President of the Executive Council; Representative of the Government in the Legislative Council; 1891 – 1893	Succeeded by Normand MacLaurin
Diplomatic posts
Preceded by Sir Daniel Cooper, Bt.	Agent-General for New South Wales; 1899 – 1900	Succeeded by Henry Copeland
