= 1863 Clarence colonial by-election =

By-election in New South Wales, Australia

A by-election was held for the New South Wales Legislative Assembly electorate of the Clarence on 23 July 1863 because Clark Irving had been absent for an entire session without leave, having travelled to England seeking the foundation of a new Anglican Diocese of Grafton & Armidale.

== Dates ==
Date	Event
27 June 1863	Writ of election issued by the Speaker of the Legislative Assembly and close of electoral rolls.
16 July 1863	Nominations
23 July 1863	Polling day, between the hours of 9 am and 4 pm
8 August 1863	Return of writ

== Results ==
1863 The Clarence by-election Thursday 23 July
Candidate	Votes	%
Clark Irving (elected)	399	73.3
William Campbell	145	26.7
Total formal votes	544	96.6
Informal votes	19	3.4
Turnout	563	33.4

Clark Irving was in England at the time of his nomination and the election.

== See also ==
- Electoral results for the district of Clarence
- List of New South Wales state by-elections
