= Graham Mylne =

Australian politician

Member of the Queensland Legislative Assembly
- In office 24 June 1867 – 18 September 1868
- Preceded by: Isaac Cook
- Succeeded by: Arthur Hodgson
- Constituency: Warrego

Personal details
- Born: 15 October 1834 St Andrews, Fife, Scotland
- Died: 5 April 1876 (aged 41) Grafton, New South Wales, Australia
- Spouse: Helena White (m. 1860)
- Occupation: Politician, pastoralist

Military service
- Allegiance: United Kingdom
- Branch/service: British Army
- Rank: Lieutenant
- Unit: 95th Regiment
- Battles/wars: Crimean War; Indian Rebellion of 1857

Graham Mylne (15 October 1834 – 5 April 1876) was an Australian politician and pastoralist in the Colony of Queensland. He was a Member of the Queensland Legislative Assembly. He was the member for Warrego from 24 June 1867 to 18 September 1868.

== Early life ==
Graham Mylne was born on 15 October 1834 in St Andrews, Fife, Scotland. He was a Lieutenant in the 95th regiment of the British Army from 1853 to 1861, seeing action on Deesa, India in 1854, the Crimea 1855, Lucknow 1857, Hunker 1858, Burugain, Sandi and Ruiya 1859.

== Australia ==
Graham arrived in Australia in 1859 to manage the family grazing property Eatonswill, near Grafton, New South Wales, and in 1860 married Helena White daughter of William and Jane White of Lota in Manly, Queensland. In 1864, he moved to Roma, Queensland, in the Maranoa district, where he leased the grazing property Amby Downs in partnership with Sir Robert Herbert, the Premier of Queensland, and Sir John Bramston, the Attorney-General of Queensland. He returned to Eatonswill in 1869 with his wife Helena and six children and lived there until his untimely death in 1876, aged 42.

Graham was a member of the Queensland Legislative Assembly, Member for Maranoa, and of the Queensland and Australian Clubs, and also a frequent guest of the governor Sir George Bowen and his wife Diamantina at Government House, Brisbane, they being of similar age and close friends. He died on 5 April 1876 in Grafton, New South Wales.

== Nina Mylne and Sir Ninian Stephen ==
His daughter and heiress Nina was travelling around Europe, when she employed as a paid companion one Barbara Stephen, who had recently been abandoned by her husband, with a new baby to look after. The baby was christened Ninian, after Nina, who paid for his early schooling in Edinburgh, London, Montreux, and Melbourne. Ninian Stephen went on to become a Justice of the High Court of Australia and Australia's longest-lived governor-general, and was knighted five times. Sir Ninian Stephen was told his father had died, and did not discover until 2003 that he had in fact moved to Canada and started a new family there.

== Historical Objects ==
The tunic of Graham Mylne from his service in the British Army is held by the Queensland Military Historical Society at Fort Lytton National Park.

The tunic was handed down by the family at Lota House, it was later donated by the family to the Queensland Women's Historical Association when the family donated Lota House to the church. During the 1990s the QWHA began rationalising its collection to fit with its charter, and many military items were subsequently donated to QMHS and the Supreme Court of Queensland Library.
