= Lilianfels, Katoomba =

Lilianfels
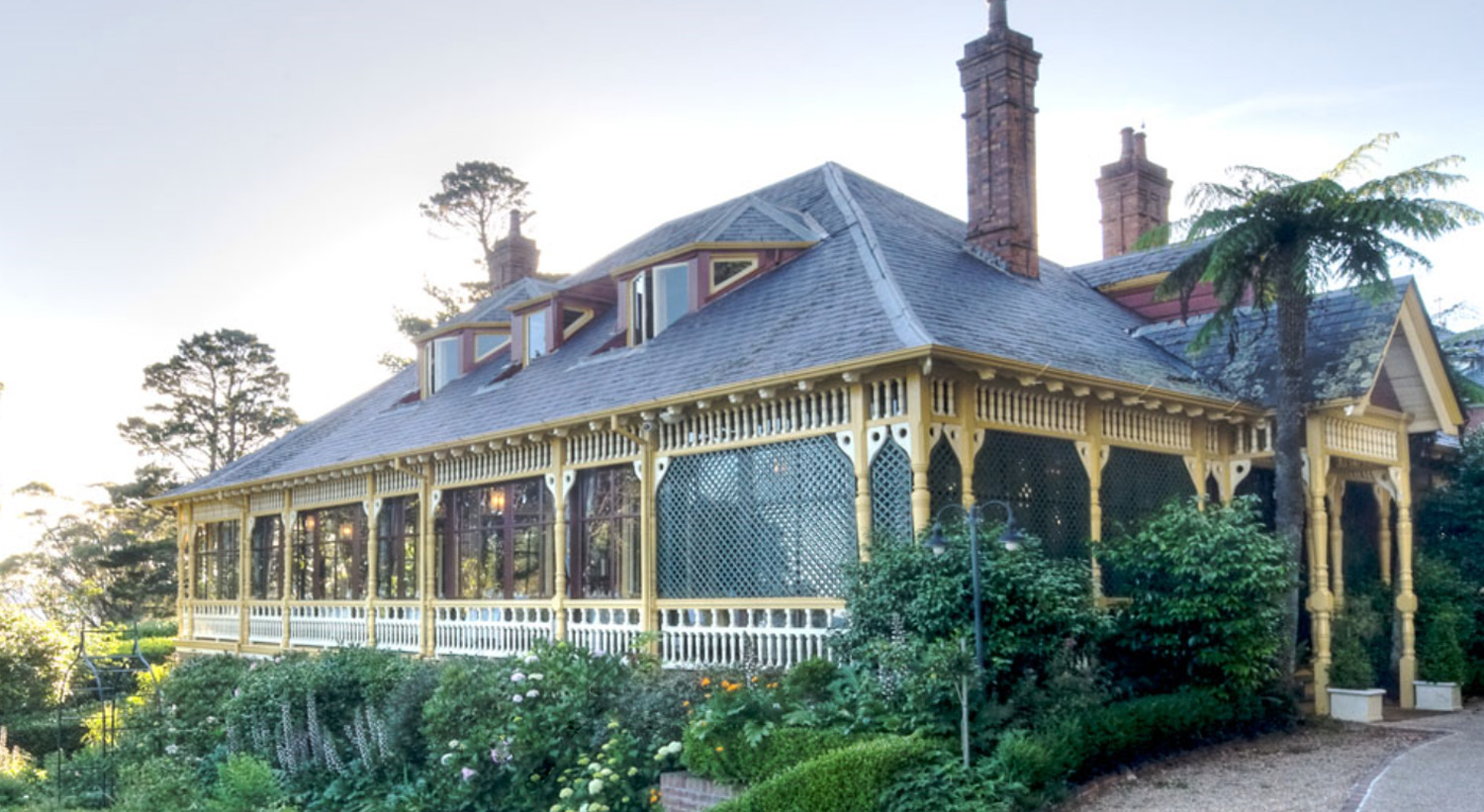

- Location within New South Wales Location within Australia
- 33°43′46″S 150°18′37″E
- Location: 10–16 Panorama Drive, Katoomba, City of Blue Mountains, New South Wales, Australia

History
- Built: 1889
- Built for: Sir Frederick Darley and Lady Darley

Site notes
- Area: 6.1 hectares (15 acres)
- Architect: Varney Parkes
- Architectural style: Queen Anne
- Owner: Lilianfels Blue Mountains Pty Ltd
- Website: Lilianfels Resort & Spa

New South Wales Heritage Register
- Official name: Lilianfels
- Type: State heritage (complex / group)
- Designated: 2 April 1999
- Reference no.: 431
- Type: Other - Residential Buildings (private)
- Category: Residential buildings (private)

Lilianfels is a heritage-listed former villa and holiday house and now luxury hotel located at 10–16 Panorama Drive, Katoomba in the City of Blue Mountains local government area of New South Wales, Australia. The house was designed by Varney Parkes and was built in 1889 by Sir Frederick Darley, Chief Justice of NSW, as his mountain retreat. The property is privately owned. It was added to the New South Wales State Heritage Register on 2 April 1999.

The house was named Lilianfels in honour of Darley's daughter who had recently died. Lilian was her name and fels is German for high ground. The Darleys owned the house for twenty years and then sold it. The property is now part of a resort and spa which provides accommodation, restaurant facilities and caters for special events, particularly weddings.

== History ==
Sir Frederick Darley, the Chief Justice of New South Wales and Lieutenant General, had the homestead built in 1889 and named it after one of his daughters, Lilian, who died of typhoid at the age of 22. The family of Ebenezer Vickery, a well-known industrialist, farmer, merchant and benefactor, owned Lilianfels. The homestead now houses a restaurant 'Darley's'. 85 guest rooms were opened in an adjacent hotel in 1992.

=== The Darley family ===
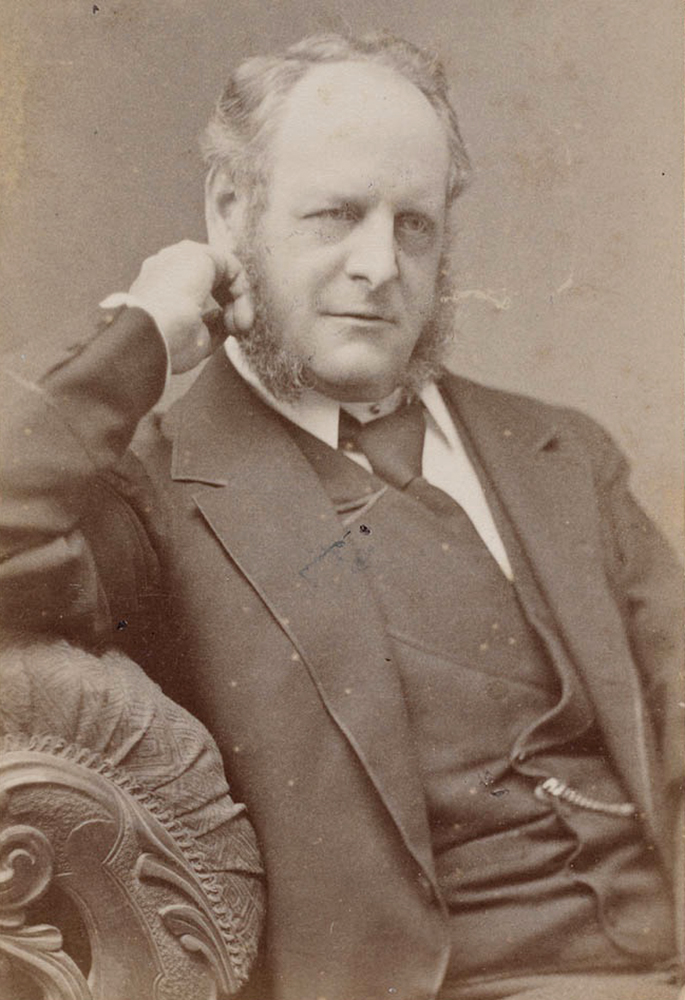
Sir Frederick Darley

Sir Frederick Matthew Darley who built Lilianfels was born in Ireland on 18 September 1830. He was the son of Henry Darley who was a part of the Irish Bar. Darley was educated at Dungannon College, County Tyrone, where his uncle, the Rev. John Darley (afterwards Bishop of Kilmore), was headmaster. He went to university and was called in the Bar in 1853.

In 1860 he married in Hertfordshire Lucy Forest Browne, an Australian, who at that time was holidaying in England with her brother Thomas Alexander Browne better known as the famous author Rolf Boldrewood. Lucy was the daughter of Captain Sylvester Browne who owned a large house in Sydney called Enmore and a grazing property called Hartlands in Victoria. She was a part of the wealthy social establishment.

After discussions with Sir Alfred Stephen, then Chief Justice of NSW who was visiting his family in England at that time, Darley decided in 1862 to move to Sydney with his family and become a lawyer. He later became a Member of the NSW Parliament and fraternised with many notable people including Sir Edmund Barton who later became the first Prime Minister, Sir John Lackey, Sir William Macarthur, Sir W. Macleay, Sir Arthur Renwick, Sir John Robertson, Sir John Hay and others.

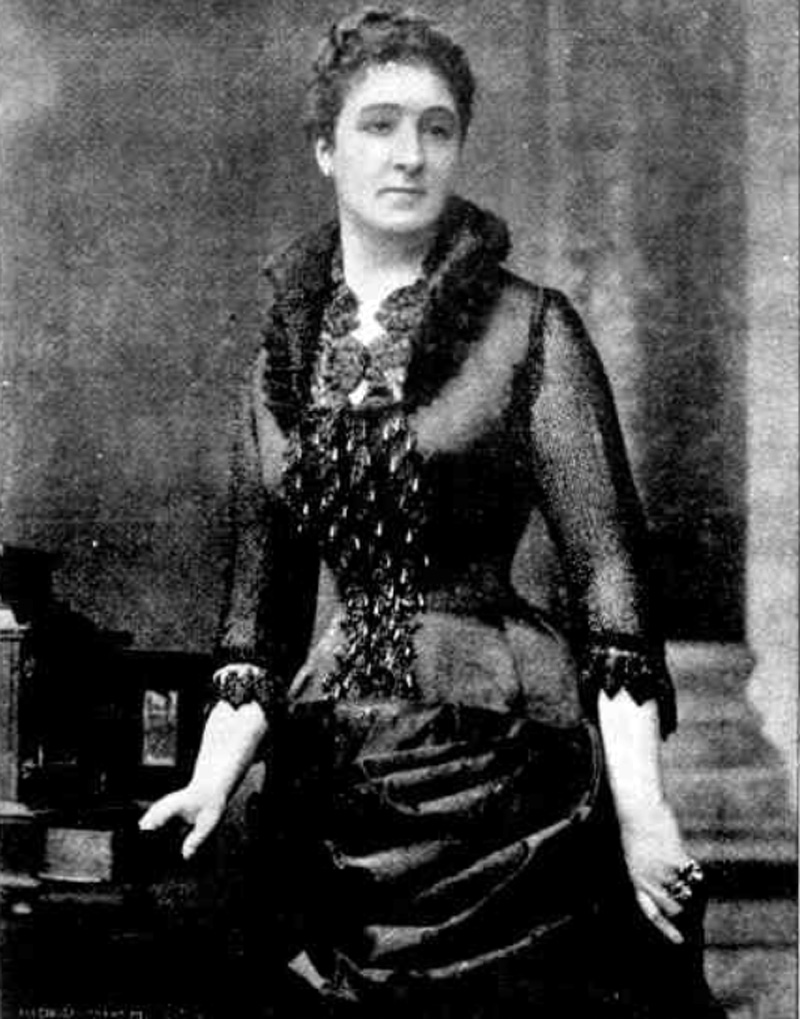
Lady Lucy Darley

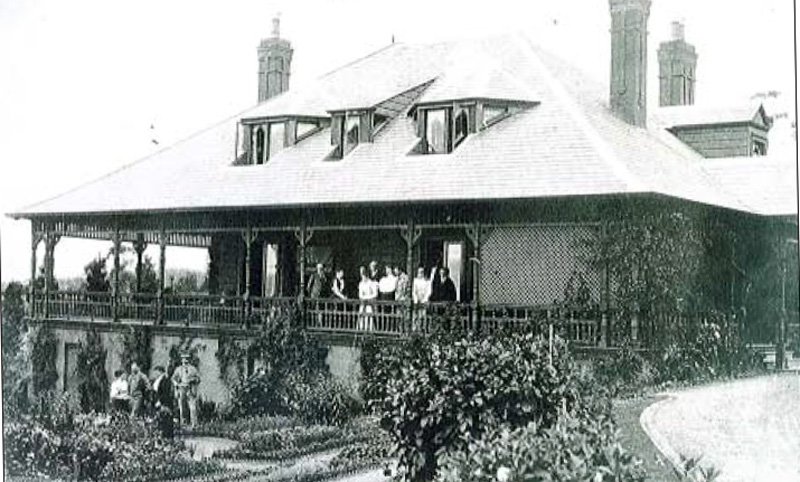
House party at Lilianfels held by the Darley family

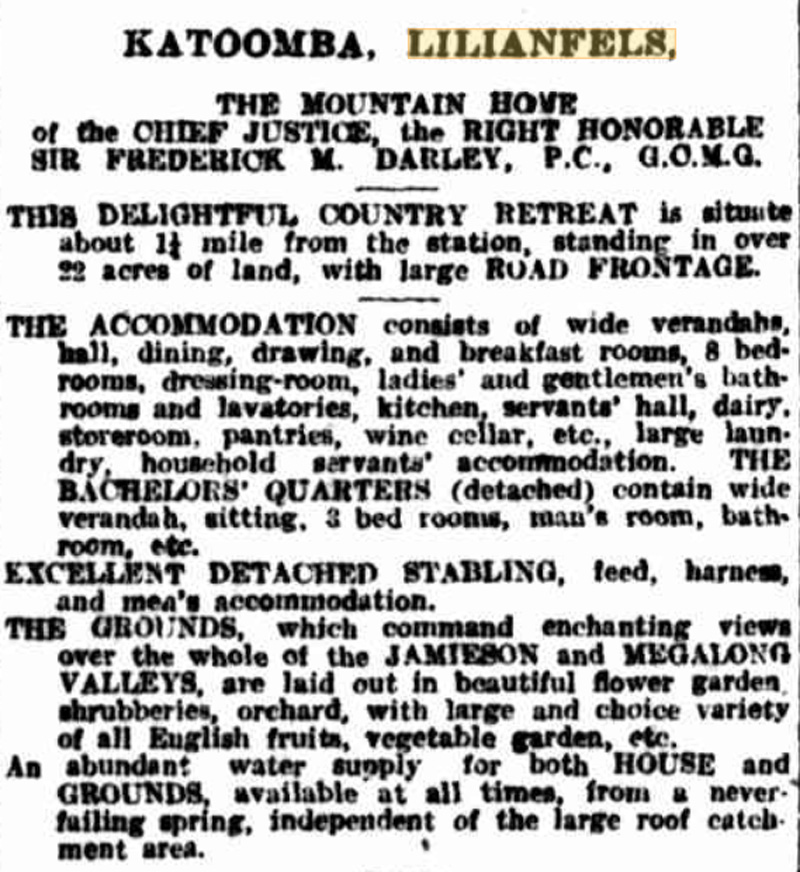
Sale notice for Lilianfels in 1907

In 1878 he became a Queens Council and in 1886 he was offered the position of Chief Justice which he accepted. Lady Lucy Darley was a firm believer in the health benefits of mountain air. She was the founder of a society called the Fresh Air League. It was possibly this that helped them to make the decision in 1888 to buy over 11 acres of land adjacent to Echo Point in Katoomba. They built a house for the family over the year of 1889, designed by architect Varney Parkes (son of Henry Parkes). The property was used for a summer residence and nearly every noted visitor to Australia including royalty accepted the Darleys' hospitality to enjoy the magnificent outlook. They were constantly mentioned in the social pages as being the ones to hold house parties at their beautiful residence. In 1894 a social columnist visited the house and gave the following account:

Yesterday we walked to "Look out Point" near which Sir Frederick Darley has built his Norwegian like villa Lilianfels. This is perhaps, one of the most beautiful mountain homes in the world, certainly the most beautiful in Australia. A magnificent view of bold mountain scenery is obtained from the verandah, which closely resembles that of Norway. The mountains are thickly wooded to their summits, and the great valleys which separate them look like immense undulating carpets worked in many shades of green. The roar of the Katoomba Falls is distinctly heard. It is in the attempt to portray this magnificent scene that Lady Darley, brush in hand, passes many hours of her summer holiday. Their house-party is not large at present, and the time is occupied by herself and daughters in the enjoyment of these pursuits, artistic and useful for which there is little time during the whirl of a social season. Sir Frederick comes up as often as his duties permit, the girls have their horses and carts so it is not surprising that life at Lilianfels can be made ever so pleasant.

In 1907 the Darleys decided to return to England and they sold their houses in Sydney and Katoomba. The advertisement for the sale of Lilianfels is shown. It was sold in 1908 to George Begg Vickery.

=== Other residents ===
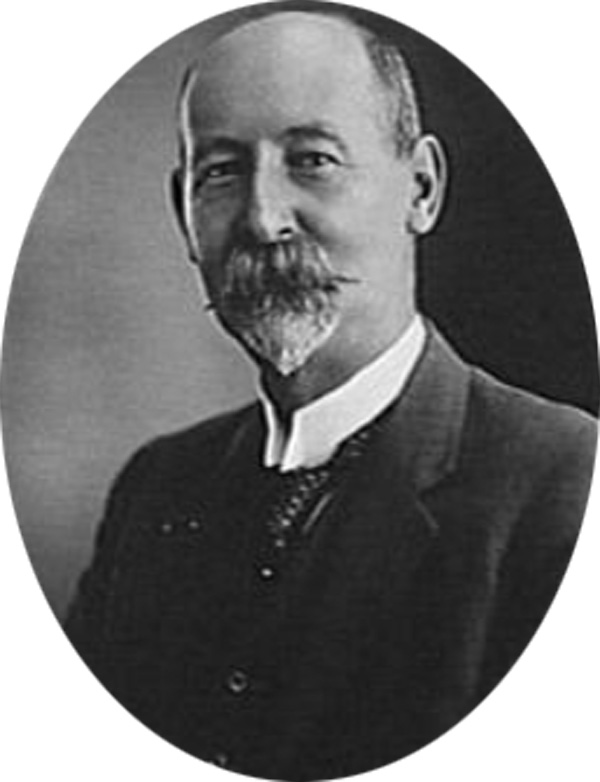
Albert Alexander Kemp

George Begg Vickery and his family used Lilianfels as a summer abode for four years and then sold it to Albert Alexander Kemp (1864–1841). He and his wife Eliza Jane used the house as a permanent residence. They held numerous fetes and fund raising activities on the property and invited friends and others to enjoy the breathtaking views. One journalist described his appreciation of the outlook in the following terms:

What views there are from the outlooks that are within the Lilianfels enclosure, and to which the present kindly hostess of the home courteously shows me. In front lies the Jamieson Valley. Densely wooded, with a little clearing here and there; undulating in every part, and with a brooklet making music as it meanders along its course and with crags and peaks of varying outline and form. The scene is one that needs the pen of a poet or the brush of an artist to do justice to it. Moreover, it is never twice the same. On another occasion it was our privilege to view the panorama as the sun was setting. With what a glory and splendour the rays of the departing day seemed to invest every aspect and feature of the scene.

The Kemps sold the property in 1920 to James Joynton Smith a flamboyant entrepreneur. In 1923 Samuel George Baker bought the house and for the next 30 years leased it to various people as a guest house. It continued to be used as a guest house until 1992 when it a new complex was built on the adjoining block of land. Today the Country House consists of 81 guest rooms and 4 suites with a 19th-century-styled décor, reading room, billiards room and lobby lounge overlooking the Jamison Valley. Darley's restaurant is located within the original summer home.

== Description ==
=== Garden/grounds ===
The current garden is an interpretation of the earlier 19th century garden determined by and functional requirements based on archival photographs. Edging tiles found on site have been utilised and additional tiles introduced as necessary. The former pinetum or area defined as "ornamental trees and shrubs" consists of plantings of conifers, Arbutus sp., azaleas, camellias, swamp cypress (Taxodium distichum) and Prunus. The cherry laurel hedge (Prunus laurocerasus) which features in a c. 1915 photograph, has been retained. A visible connection to the street and interpretation of the early entrance drive has been retained on the eastern side of the property.

The gardens and grounds are largely overgrown. Remains of the driveway, paths and garden beds are discernible by edging tiles and changes of level. There are remains of brick drains, hedges, rock edging, steps and gates. The driveway is flanked by rhododendrons and laurels. Close to the house are plantings of hydrangeas and agapanthus. The grounds contain many exotic plants, dense groves of pine trees and an area once used as a tennis court.

=== House ===
The main house is a substantial timber framed weatherboard bungalow building on a red brick base, a rectangular hipped slate roof with brick chimneys punctuated by dormers on the front and rear, lighting attic bedrooms. Dormers facing towards the Jamison Valley have an unusual faceted configuration and small open spaces in front of them. Chimneys are tall and constructed out of brickwork that has been distinctively detailed with strapwork and also tuckpointed.

The corners of the external walls have been unusually detailed with quoins.

Several wide verandahs surround it; the main one along the front and the two sides feature turned timber posts with decorative timber fretwork valances and railings. The side verandah features a coloured leadlight window. The verandahs feature substantial turned posts, timber balustrading, turned valance joinery and exposed rafter ends. The treads of the steps up to the verandah have been formed from single pieces of slate, whilst risers have been tiled.

The main entry is located beyond a gable roofed porch that projects beyond the verandah.

=== Outbuildings ===
The originally detached weatherboard kitchen block has been linked to the main house by an enclosed passageway. Its roofline follows the form of the main house roof. The detached cottage, The Kennels is built of weatherboard similarly to the main house, though it is not as elaborate. The shed is a simple rustic building of timber with a skillion roof.(AHC)

== Heritage listing ==
Lilianfels has historic and social significance as the core remnant estate comprising a summer residence built for Sir Frederick Darley, Chief Justice, Lieutenant Governor of NSW and then Privy Counsellor, and Lady Darley.

The house has aesthetic significance as a fine example of a late Victorian/ early Queen Anne house designed by Varney Parkes and remains substantially intact. Some of the original interior finishes remain and thus it is a good example of a house and lifestyle of the period.

The site comprises the house, kitchen, cottage and extensive gardens, all of which provide an attractive setting and have high aesthetic value for a complex which demonstrates the characteristics of a summer residence in the Blue Mountains.

The gardens and grounds have historic significance as remnants of Chief Justice Darley's 1880s estate at Echo Point. The gardens and grounds of Lilianfels, although substantially altered, still contain some important elements of the original layout and demonstrate the key characteristics of the late 19th century summer estates developed in the Blue Mountains by wealthy and prominent citizens of Sydney. The exotic trees, hedges and vistas to Lilianfels house are important to the understanding of the historical development of Echo Point.

The location and orientation of the house near Echo Point and overlooking the Jamison Valley and set within attractive gardens provides an outstanding aesthetic appeal for the house, setting, and locality.

The remnant estate has been an important part of Katoomba for its historic and social associations.

An important late Victorian summer residence built for Sir Frederick Darley, Chief Justice and Lieutenant Governor of New South Wales and Lady Darley (Criterion H.1). The house is architecturally significant as the work of Varney Parkes, later government architect, in an early version of the Queen Anne style (Criterion F.1). The house, kitchen block, detached cottage, mature garden and the prospect over Jamison Valley are highly valued for their aesthetic qualities (Criterion F.1). The complex is important for the way it demonstrates the characteristics of summer residences built in the Blue Mountains in the late nineteenth century by prominent figures of New South Wales (NSW) society (Criterion D.2). It is valued by the community for its historic and social associations and for its later role as a popular guest house (Criterion G.1).

Lilianfels was listed on the New South Wales State Heritage Register on 2 April 1999.

== See also ==
- Australian residential architectural styles
