= Clark Irving =

Australian politician

Member of the New South Wales Parliament for Clarence and Darling Downs
- In office 15 April 1856 – 19 December 1857
- Preceded by: First election
- Succeeded by: Arthur Hodgson

Member of the New South Wales Parliament for Clarence
- In office 21 June 1859 – 10 November 1864
- Preceded by: New electorate
- Succeeded by: John Laycock

Personal details
- Born: 1 January 1808 Wigton, England
- Died: 13 January 1865 (aged 57) Brighton, England

Clark Irving (1 January 1808 – 13 January 1865) was an Australian merchant pastoralist and politician. He was a member of the New South Wales Legislative Assembly from 1856 until 1864.

== Early life ==
Irving was the son of a Cumberland farmer. He received only an elementary education and moved to London at an early age. After gaining business experience he emigrated to Sydney in 1836 and established a mixed mercantile business trading in watches, jewellery and wool. In 1843, he bought Casino station on the Richmond River and established a herd of short-horn cattle. He was highly successful in this venture and by 1856 he had expanded his runs to include 279,040 acres in the Richmond River and Darling Downs districts. While developing these properties he continued to spend much of his time in Sydney and was well known in colonial social circles. Irving also developed a practice as a trustee for insolvent estates and was a director of companies including the Australasian Sugar Company, the Australasian Steam Navigation Company and the Newcastle-Wallsend Coal Company. After 1862, Irving very actively pursued the establishment of an Anglican diocese in Grafton. He donated £2,000 of his own money to the diocese and toured England for his business interests and to raise further funds for the diocese. However, during this trip he lost his fortune by investing in Spanish railways and subsequently developed pneumonia and died. He was associated with many local organisations in the Clarence region.

== Colonial Parliament ==
In 1856, at the first election held under responsible self-government, Irving was elected as the Legislative Assembly member for Clarence and Darling. This massive electorate covered an area extending from Grafton to Warwick. Irving's interests were mainly in the southern area of the electorate and he opposed the separation of Queensland as a separate colony. Consequently, at the next election in 1858, he lost the support of electors in the northern area of the electorate and was defeated. Irving re-entered the Assembly as the member for Clarence after the Darling Downs were placed in the new colony of Queensland in 1859. He was a tireless local member, who gained government support for improved river navigation, connection to the telegraph service and a gold escort. During his prolonged trip to England his seat was declared vacant due to absence but, despite still being abroad, he won the subsequent by-election.

== Memorial ==
The Irving Bridge over the Richmond River in Casino is named for him.

New South Wales Legislative Assembly
| New assembly | Member for Clarence and Darling Downs; Apr 1856 – Dec 1857 | Succeeded by Arthur Hodgson |
| New district Darling Downs became part of Queensland | Member for Clarence; 1861–1864 | Succeeded by John Laycock |
