= Electoral district of Clarence and Darling Downs =

State electoral district of New South Wales, Australia

Clarence and Darling Downs New South Wales—Legislative Assembly
- State: New South Wales
- Created: 1856
- Abolished: 1859
- Namesake: Clarence River, Darling Downs

Clarence and Darling Downs was an electoral district of the Legislative Assembly in the Australian colony of New South Wales from 1856 to 1859. It included the Clarence Valley and the Darling Downs region. The New South Wales part of the electorate was replaced by The Clarence while the Darling Downs was briefly a separate electorate prior to the separation of Queensland in December 1859.

== Members for Clarence and Darling Downs ==
Member	Party	Period
Clark Irving	None	1856–1857
Arthur Hodgson	None	1858–1859

== Election results ==
=== 1856 ===
1856 New South Wales colonial election: Clarence and Darling Downs
Candidate	Votes	%
Clark Irving (elected)	193	65.9
Colin McKenzie	100	34.1
Total formal votes	293	100.0
Informal votes	0	0.0
Turnout	293	46.1

Polling was conducted on 15 April 1856. Sitting Legislative Councillor for Pastoral Districts of Clarence and Darling Downs was Thomas Hood who did not contest the election but was appointed to the new Legislative Council.

=== 1858 ===
1858 New South Wales colonial election: Clarence and Darling Downs 12 February
Candidate	Votes	%
Arthur Hodgson (elected)	unopposed	

The sitting member Clark Irving unsuccessfully contested Northumberland and Hunter.
