= Edward Hodgson (cricketer) =

English clergyman and a cricketer

Edward Franks Hodgson (28 August 1813 – 9 March 1882) was an English clergyman and a cricketer who played in first-class cricket matches for Cambridge University in 1835 and 1836. He was born in Rickmansworth, Hertfordshire and died at Holton cum Beckering in Lincolnshire.

Hodgson's role as a cricketer is not clear: he both opened the batting and batted as low as No 10 in the batting order in his three first-class games, one of which was the 1836 University Match against Oxford University; there is no evidence that he bowled in important matches. In six first-class innings, he scored just 18 runs.

== Broader career ==
Hodgson was educated at Eton College and at St John's College, Cambridge; after graduation, he was ordained as a Church of England priest and following two years as curate at Bayford, Hertfordshire he became rector of Holton cum Beckering in 1844 and remained there until his death, unmarried, in 1882.
