= Arthur Hodgson =

Australian politician

Sir Arthur Hodgson KCMG
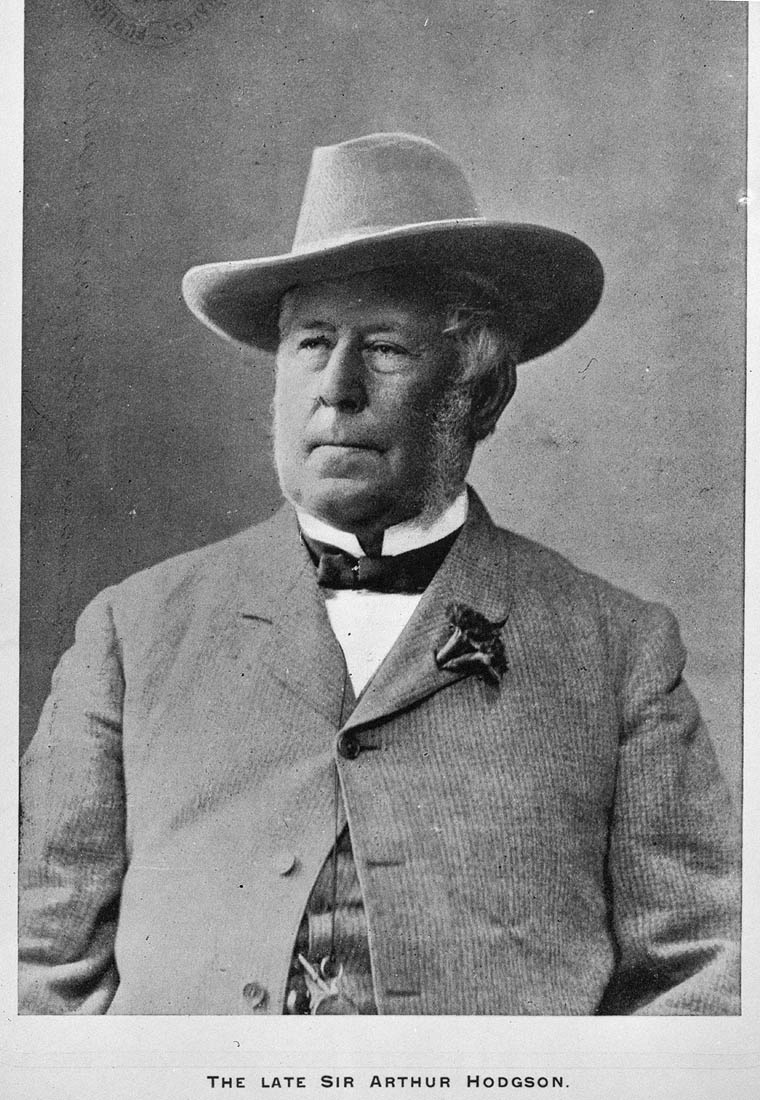

Member of the New South Wales Legislative Assembly for Clarence and Darling Downs
- In office 29 January 1858 – 11 April 1859
- Preceded by: Clark Irving
- Succeeded by: Seat abolished

Member of the New South Wales Legislative Assembly for Newcastle
- In office 14 June 1859 – 10 November 1860
- Preceded by: New seat
- Succeeded by: James Hannell

Member of the Queensland Legislative Assembly for Warrego
- In office 18 September 1868 – 23 November 1869
- Preceded by: Graham Mylne
- Succeeded by: Thomas McIlwraith

Personal details
- Born: Arthur Hodgson; 29 June 1818 Rickmansworth, Hertfordshire, England
- Died: 24 December 1902 (aged 84) Clopton House, near Stratford-on-Avon, Warwickshire, England
- Resting place: Stratford-upon-Avon Cemetery
- Spouse: Eliza Dowling (m.1842 d.1902)
- Relations: Edward Hodgson (brother), Sir James Dowling (father-in-law)
- Education: Corpus Christi College, Cambridge
- Occupation: Grazier, Squire

Sir Arthur Hodgson KCMG (29 June 1818 – 24 December 1902) was an Australian squatter and politician.

== Early life ==
Hodgson was born in Rickmansworth, Hertfordshire, England; the second son of the Rev. Edward Hodgson and his third wife Charlotte, daughter of Francis William Pemberton of Bombay, India. Hodgson was educated at Eton from 1828 to 1833 and then entered the Royal Navy and was a midshipman from 1833 to 1837 on HMS Canopus on the China station. In 1837–38 he studied at Corpus Christi College, Cambridge.

== Australia ==
In 1839 Hodgson moved to Australia, arriving in Sydney, and soon leased Cashiobury run in the New England district. In July 1840, he sought new land further north in the Moreton Bay district (as it was then known, now called Queensland) based on advice from Patrick Leslie. With a partner, Gilbert Eliott, and his brother, Christopher Pemberton Hodgson, Arthur Hodgson squatted Eton Vale, the second pastoral run on the Darling Downs in September 1840. In the 1846 publication, Reminiscences of Australia with Hints on the Squatters' Life, Hodgson's brother describes the conflict involved in the taking of land ownership from Aboriginal Australians. They named this property Etonvale after Eton College, the illustrious school they both attended in England. The land they marked out was in the possession of the Barunggam people and the book recorded in some detail their "constant skirmishes with the natives" to wrest control of the area, and how "so many hundreds of these poor creatures have been sacrificed". The Hodgson brothers took an active role in the killings. The homestead was decorated with "swords, guns and..all around are displayed spears, boomerangs..dillies and calabashes, the spoil of a hard fought battle or a surprised camp of natives."

In 1842 Arthur Hodgson married the daughter of Sir James Dowling, Chief Justice of New South Wales, which helped advance his position there. In 1856–61 he became general superintendent of the Australian Agricultural Company.

Sir Arthur Hodgson, Portrait by Henry Jones Thaddeus, 1899

== Return to England ==
Hodgson served as High Sheriff of Warwickshire in 1881, as mayor of Stratford from 1883 to 1888, as well as high steward of the borough from 1884 to 1889. Hodgson was created Companion (CMG) of the Order of St Michael and St George in 1878, and Knight Commander (KCMG) in that Order in 1886 for services in representing Queensland in the exhibitions of Vienna (1873), Paris (1878) and London (1886).

== Family ==
Hodgson married, in 1842, Eliza Dowling, second daughter of Sir James Dowling. They had seven children, including Annie Frances Hodgson, who went on to marry James Wilfred Hewitt, 5th Viscount Lifford. Lady Hodgson died on 2 May 1902, in her 81st year. Hodgson died later that year, at Clopton House on 24 December 1902 and was buried with his wife in Stratford-upon-Avon Cemetery.

== Legacy ==
The small township of Hodgson in the Maranoa Region, the locality of Hodgson Vale in the Toowoomba Region, and Hodgson Creek in the Toowoomba Region are named in his honour.

New South Wales Legislative Council
Preceded by John Richardson	Member for County of Stanley; Mar 1854 – Jul 1854	Succeeded by John Lang
New South Wales Legislative Assembly
Preceded by Clark Irving	Member for Clarence and Darling Downs; 1858–1859	Succeeded by Clark Irving as Member for Clarence
New district	Member for Newcastle; 1859–1860	Succeeded by James Hannell
Parliament of Queensland
Preceded by Graham Mylne	Member from Warrego; 1868–1869	Succeeded by Thomas McIlwraith
