= Joseph Docker =

Australian politician

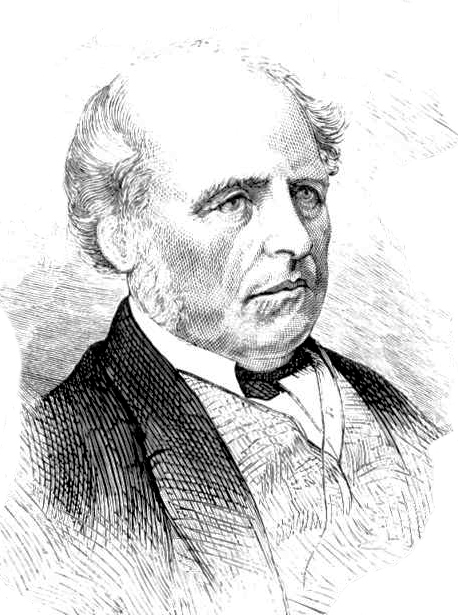
Joseph Docker, 1875 engraving

Hon. Joseph Docker (1802 – 9 December 1884), was an Australian grazier, early amateur photographer and politician. He was a member of the New South Wales Legislative Council from 1856 to 1861, and again from 1863 until his death in1884. Docker held a number of cabinet positions and other senior executive roles during his 26 years in the New South Wales upper house.

Docker was the second son of wool merchant Robert Docker, of London, of the Dockers of Westmorland (now part of Cumbria). His mother was Eliza, née Perry. Born in 1802, Docker left school at 13 and was apprenticed to Dr Thomas Docker of Dover, whose daughter Agnes he married in 1830. He became a surgeon in the service of the East India Company.

Docker emigrated to the Colony of New South Wales (Australia) in 1835 and established himself as a grazier, with 10,000 acres in the Upper Hunter Valley, at "Thornthwaite", near Scone. Agnes died in childbirth, and Docker briefly returned to England. He was married in April 1839 to Matilda, daughter of Major Thomas Brougham of the East India Company (Presidency armies), from Penrith, Cumberland. They returned to Australia together, and subsequently had a daughter and six sons, including Ernest Brougham Docker.

Docker was appointed a member of the Legislative Council (upper house) in New South Wales on 20 May 1856 after being defeated as a candidate for the New South Wales Legislative Assembly seat of Phillip, Brisbane and Bligh. He was a member of the Council until 10 May 1861, and again from 16 December 1863 until 11 December 1884 (his death).

He was twice Postmaster-General: from January 1866 to September 1868 in the second ministry of James Martin, and from December 1870 to May 1872 in Martin's third Ministry. As Representative (leader) of the government in the upper house on the first occasion, he introduced and carried through Henry Parkes's Public School Bill in 1866, which required teachers to have training and created a funding mechanism. A council of education was formed, and as a result of the bill many new schools were established all over the colony.

He was briefly Colonial Secretary in the last month of Martin's second ministry. Docker was the Representative of the Government in the Legislative Council on four occasions, in the first and second Martin ministries and in the third and fourth Robertson ministries. Docker was also Minister of Justice and Public Instruction in the third Robertson ministry and Vice-President of the Executive Council in the fourth Robertson ministry.

He was twice Chairman of Committees of the New South Wales Legislative Council, in 1873–1875 and again in 1880–1884.

In 1864 Docker was one of the three Australian commissioners tasked by the Government of New Zealand with choosing a new location for the capital for that country. Together with Francis Murphy (Victoria) and Ronald Campbell Gunn (Tasmania), he traveled to New Zealand to inspect various possible locations, and the commissioners recommended for the capital to move from Auckland to Wellington.

He died on 9 December 1884 (aged 81–82) in Sydney.

Political offices
Preceded by James Cunneen	Postmaster-General; 1866–1868	Succeeded by Atkinson Tighe
Preceded by James Martin	Colonial Secretary; Sep–Oct 1868	Succeeded by John Robertson
Preceded by John Hargrave	Representative of the Government in the Legislative Council; 1866–1868	Succeeded by Robert Owen
Preceded by Daniel Egan	Postmaster-General; 1870–1872	Succeeded by George Lloyd
Preceded by Robert Owen	Representative of the Government in the Legislative Council; 1870–1872	Succeeded by Saul Samuel
Preceded by George Allen	Minister of Justice and Public Instruction; 1875–1877	Succeeded by Francis Suttor
Preceded by Joseph Innes	Representative of the Government in the Legislative Council; 1875–1877	Succeeded by George Lloyd
Dormant Title last held by Saul Samuel	Vice-President of the Executive Council; Aug–Dec 1877	Succeeded by John Marks
Preceded by George Lloyd	Representative of the Government in the Legislative Council; Aug–Dec 1877	Succeeded by John Marks
New South Wales Legislative Council
Preceded by George Allen	Chairman of Committees; 1873–1875	Succeeded by Joseph Innes
Preceded by Joseph Innes	Chairman of Committees; 1880–1884	Succeeded by William Piddington
