= Electoral district of Phillip, Brisbane and Bligh =

Former state electoral district of New South Wales, Australia

Phillip, Brisbane and Bligh was an electoral district of the Legislative Assembly in the Australian state of New South Wales from 1856 to 1859. It included Phillip, Brisbane and Bligh counties, including Scone, Murrurundi, Dunedoo and Mudgee. It was replaced by Upper Hunter and Mudgee.

== Members for Phillip, Brisbane and Bligh ==
Member	Party	Term
John Robertson	None	1856–1859

== Election results ==
=== 1856 ===
1856 New South Wales colonial election: Phillip, Brisbane and Bligh
Candidate	Votes	%
John Robertson (elected)	169	74.1
Joseph Docker	59	25.9
Total formal votes	228	100.0
Informal votes	0	0.0
Turnout	228	53.3

Polling was conducted on 11 April 1856. William Dumaresq, the sitting Legislative Councillor for Counties of Phillip, Brisbane and Bligh, did not contest the election.

=== 1858 ===
1858 New South Wales colonial election: Phillip, Brisbane and Bligh 11 February
Candidate	Votes	%
John Robertson (re-elected)	unopposed	
