= Henry Osborne (Australian politician) =

Australian politician (1803–1859)

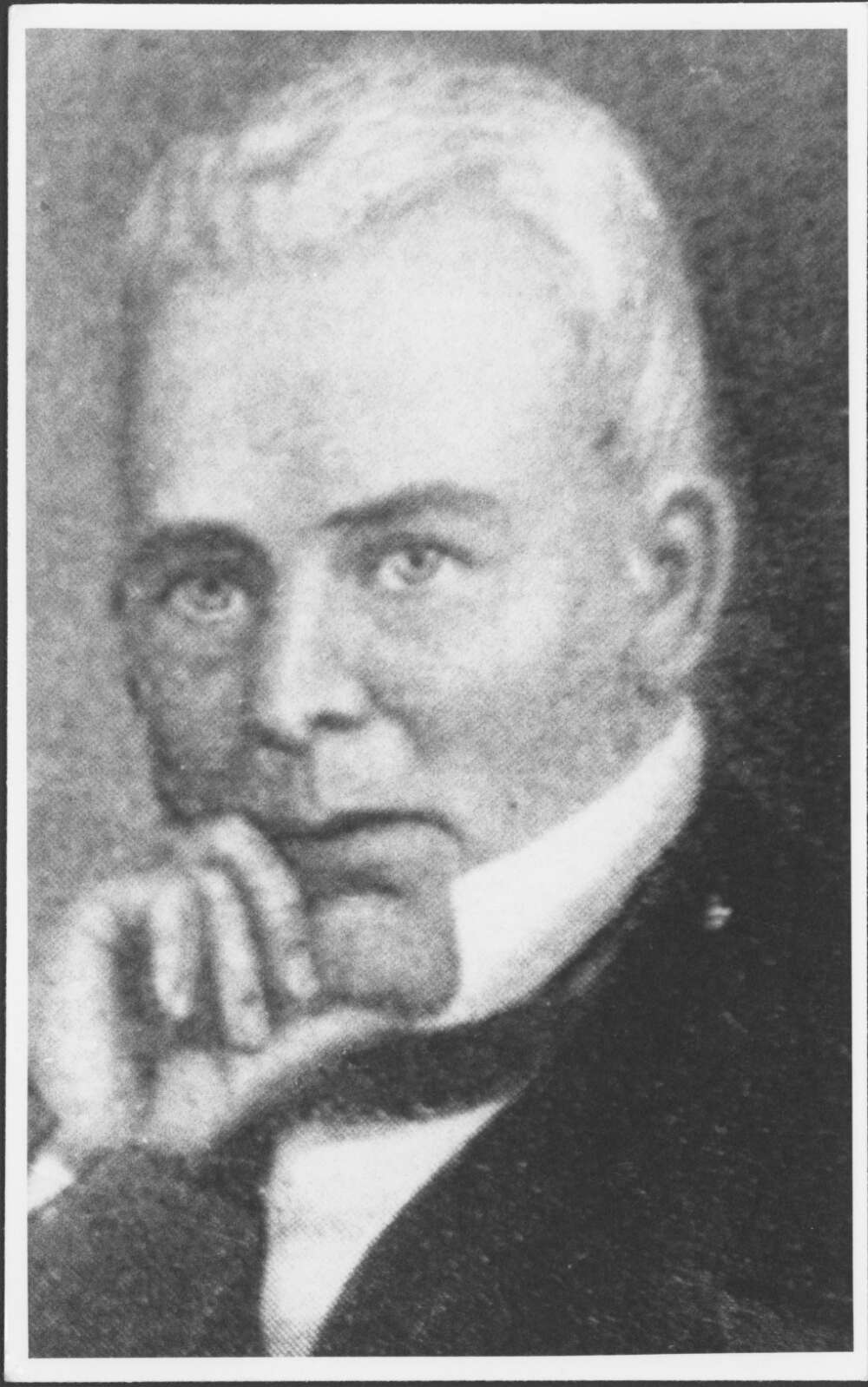

Personal details
- Born: 8 February 1803 County Tyrone, Ireland
- Died: 26 February 1859 (aged 56) Marshall Mount, New South Wales

Henry Osborne (8 February 1803 – 26 February 1859) was an Australian pastoralist, collier and politician. He was a member of the New South Wales Legislative Council between 1851 and 1856. He was also a member of the New South Wales Legislative Assembly for one term from 1856 until 1857.

== Early life ==
Osborne was the son of an Irish farmer. He had an elementary education in County Tyrone and inherited his father's property. In 1829, on the advice of two brothers who had already emigrated to New South Wales, he liquidated his assets for £3000 and invested in a consignment of Irish linen which he exported to Sydney. From the proceeds of the linen he acquired a land grant of 2,560 acres and established a dairy farm at Marshall Mount near Dapto. By 1850, Osborne had acquired further substantial property in the Illawarra and Murrumbidgee districts and had also developed coal mines at Mount Keira and Maitland.

== Colonial Parliament ==
In 1851, prior to the establishment of responsible government, Osborne was elected to the semi-elected Legislative Council. He represented the electorate of East Camden until the granting of self-government in 1856. Subsequently, at the first election under the new constitution he was elected to the Legislative Assembly as one of the two members for the same seat. He was subsequently defeated at the 1858 election and then retired from public life. He did not hold a parliamentary or ministerial position. His brother Alick was an elected member of the Legislative Council from 1851 to 1855. while his sons Patrick, and James, were also members of the Legislative Assembly.

New South Wales Legislative Council
New district	Member for County of Camden (Eastern Division); 1 September 1851 – 29 February 1856	Original Council abolished
New South Wales Legislative Assembly
Preceded by First election	Member for East Camden; 1856 – 1857; With: John Marks	Succeeded by Robert Owen
