= John Hargrave (judge) =

Australian politician

John Fletcher Hargrave QC
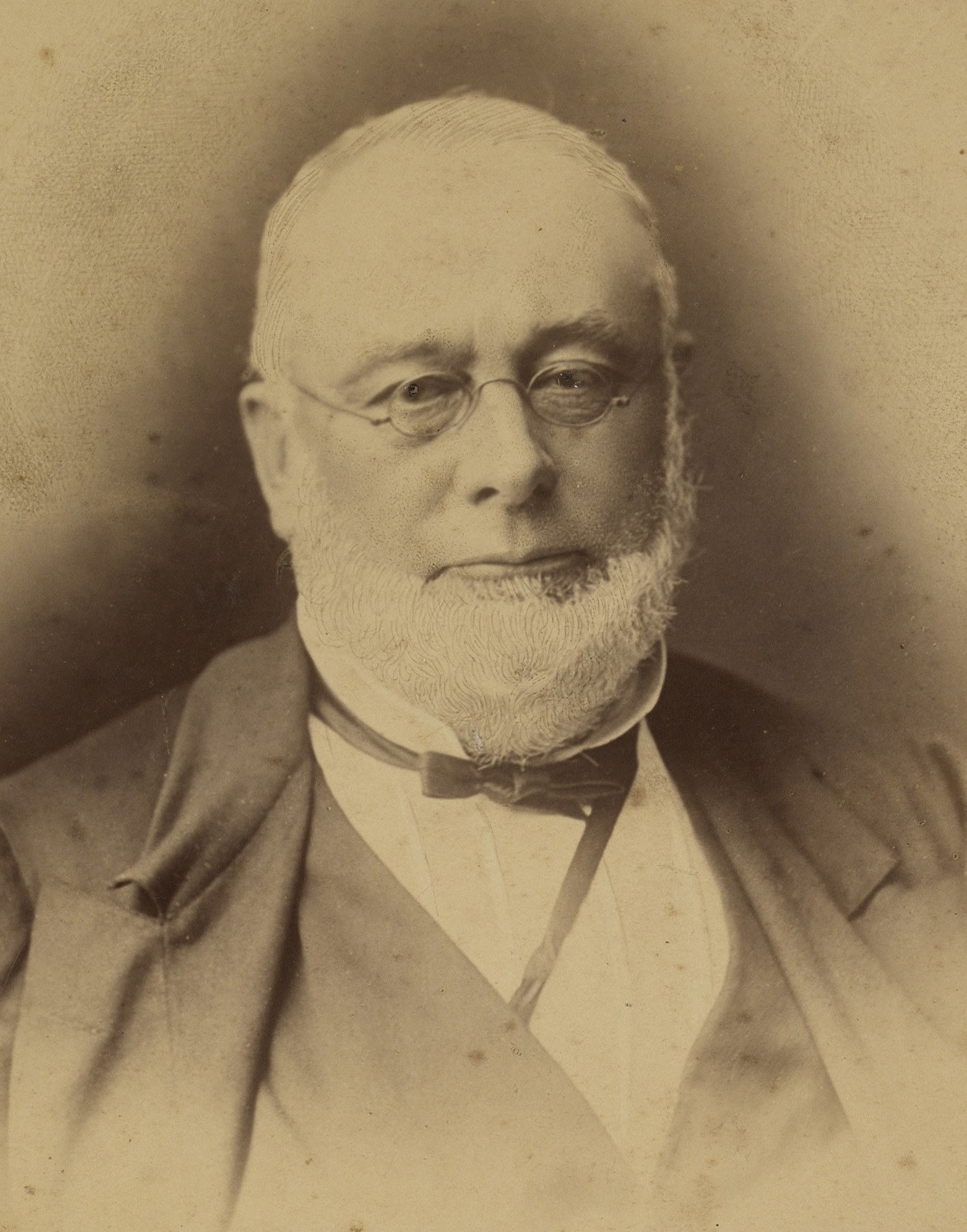
- Portrait of John Fletcher Hargrave, ca. 1875

Judge of the Supreme Court
- In office 22 June 1865 – 11 October 1881

Member of Legislative Council of New South Wales
- In office 12 October 1859 – 23 June 1865

Member of the New South Wales Legislative Assembly for East Camden
- In office 15 March 1859 – 11 April 1859

Member of the New South Wales Legislative Assembly for Illawarra
- In office 15 June 1859 – 11 October 1859

Judge of the District Court
- In office 3 February 1859 – 21 February 1859

Personal details
- Born: 28 December 1815 Greenwich, England
- Died: 23 February 1885 (aged 69) Rushcutters Bay, New South Wales
- Spouse: Ann Hargrave
- Children: Lawrence Hargrave

John Fletcher Hargrave QC (28 December 1815 – 23 February 1885) was a British-born Australian politician and judge.

Hargrave was born to Joshua Hargrave and Sarah Hargrave (née Lee) at Greenwich, England. His father was a hardware merchant. He was educated at King's College, London in 1830 winning a certificate of honour for rhetoric. He went on to Trinity College, Cambridge and was awarded a Bachelor of Arts in 1837 and a Master of Arts in 1840. He enrolled at Lincoln's Inn and was called to the Bar in 1841.

He married his cousin Ann Hargrave on 20 September 1843. They were to have three sons and a daughter. He retired from the bar in 1851 and some time after was committed to an asylum at Colney Hatch in Middlesex by his wife and he gradually recovered there. He never forgave his wife for this.

He migrated to Sydney, New South Wales in February 1857. He was admitted to the New South Wales bar on his arrival and became a judge of the District Court. His wife returned to England because he could not endure her presence. He resigned from the bench in February 1859 as his judgeship was "disastrous for women suitors" as he regularly decided against them.

Following his resignation, he was appointed Solicitor General for New South Wales on 21 February 1859 in the second Cowper ministry and held that appointment until 26 October of that year. He was not a member of parliament at the time he was appointed Solicitor General and Robert Owen, the member for East Camden, was appointed to the District Court to replace Hargrave, and Hargrave in turn replaced Owen as the member for East Camden at the resulting by-election. East Camden was abolished in 1859, partly replaced by Illawarra, and Hargrave was successful at the election on 15 June, but only served until 11 October 1859, when he resigned to accept an appointment to the Legislative Council.

On 12 October 1859 he was appointed to the Legislative Council, filling the vacant role of Representative of the Government in the Legislative Council. When the second Cowper ministry resigned, Hargrave was reappointed Solicitor General in the Forster ministry on 3 November and held it till 8 March 1860. He was appointed Attorney General in the first Robertson ministry from 2 April 1860, retaining the position in the third Cowper ministry until 31 July 1863. Hargrave controversially accepted the lesser role of Solicitor General to allow John Darvall to be appointed Attorney General. He was appointed Queen's Counsel on 7 August 1863. Hargrave was Solicitor General from 1 August 1863 and 15 October 1863 and again in the fourth Cowper ministry from 3 February until 21 June 1865. Hargrave resigned from the Legislative Council on 23 June 1865.

In Parliament he was on the:

- Standing Orders Committee,
- Elections and Qualifications Committee,
- Burwood Tramroad Continuation Act Amendment Bill Committee,
- Late Shipwrecks Committee
- Port Jackson Committee; and
- the Australian Agricultural Company's Newcastle Railway Bill Committee.

He was appointed a judge of the Supreme Court of New South Wales on 22 June 1865 but his swearing-in was boycotted by the New South Wales Bar. He was the Judge in divorce appointed to the Divorce Division of the Court. He proved to be a disaster on the bench and he admitted that he did not sit before 11am or work after 1pm. He retired as a judge in 1881.

He became reader in general jurisprudence at the University of Sydney, becoming the colony's first law lecturer on 3 August 1858. His course of twenty lectures were published in 1878.

He died at Rushcutters Bay on 23 February 1885 (aged 69) and was buried in Waverley Cemetery. His wife Ann died on the North Shore on 29 October 1885 (aged 66).

His brother Richard Hargrave also served in the New South Wales Parliament after arriving in New South Wales in 1838. His son Lawrence Hargrave was the inventor of the box or cellular kite. Hargrave's great, great nephew Rick Colless was a member of the Legislative Council.

New South Wales Legislative Assembly
Preceded by Robert Owen	Member for East Camden; March – April 1859; Served alongside: John Marks	Seat abolished mostly replaced by Illawarra
New seat mostly replacing East Camden	Member for Illawarra; June – October 1859	Succeeded by Samuel Gordon
Political offices
Preceded by William Dalley	Solicitor General; February 1859 – March 1860	Dormant Title next held by Himself
Preceded by John Dickson	Representative of the Government in the Legislative Council; 12 – 15 October 1859	Succeeded by Geoffrey Eagar
Preceded by Geoffrey Eagar	Representative of the Government in the Legislative Council; March 1860 – October 1863	Succeeded by John Plunkett
Preceded by William Manning	Attorney General; March 1860 – July 1863	Succeeded by John Darvall
Dormant Title last held by himself	Solicitor General; August – October 1863	Succeeded by Peter Faucett
Preceded by Peter Faucett as Solicitor General	Solicitor General; Representative of the Government in the Legislative Council; February 1865 – January 1866	Succeeded by Robert Isaacs as Solicitor General
Preceded by John Plunkett as Representative of the Government	Solicitor General; Representative of the Government in the Legislative Council; February 1865 – January 1866	Succeeded by Joseph Docker as Representative of the Government
