= Frederick Matthew Darley =

Australian politician

The Right Honourable Sir Frederick Matthew Darley GCMG
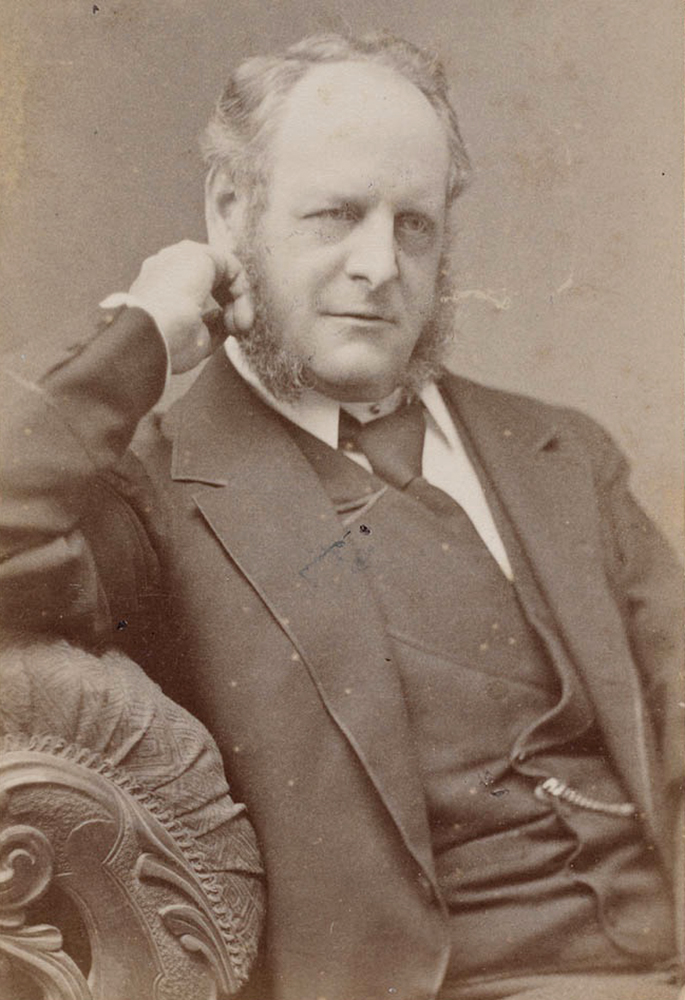
- Sir Frederick Darley

6th Chief Justice of New South Wales
- In office 29 November 1886 – 4 January 1910
- Preceded by: Sir Julian Salomons
- Succeeded by: Sir William Cullen

Lieutenant-Governor of New South Wales
- In office 26 November 1891 – 30 March 1910
- Preceded by: Sir Alfred Stephen
- Succeeded by: Sir William Cullen

Member of the Legislative Council of New South Wales
- In office 13 October 1868 – 1 December 1886

Personal details
- Born: 18 September 1830 Bray, County Wicklow, Ireland
- Died: 4 January 1910 (aged 79) London, England, UK

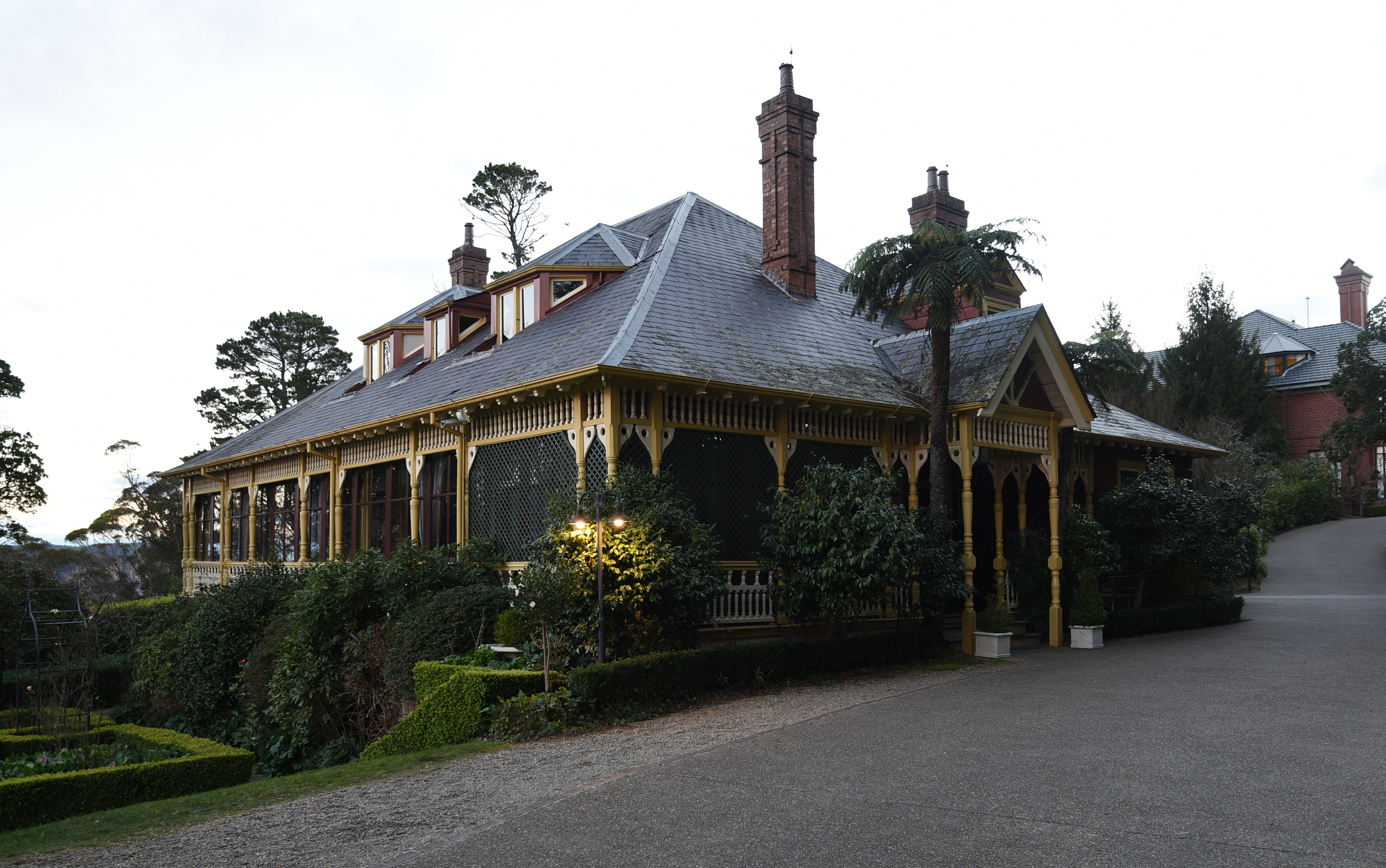
Lilianfels, Darley's old retreat in Katoomba

Sir Frederick Matthew Darley GCMG PC (18 September 1830 – 4 January 1910) was the sixth Chief Justice of New South Wales, (Note: He is also referred to as the 5th Chief Justice, owing to Julian Salomons resigning before being sworn in.) an eminent barrister, a member of the New South Wales Parliament, Lieutenant-Governor of New South Wales, and a member of the British Privy Council.

== Early years ==
Darley was an Anglo-Irishman, the first son of Henry Darley (son of Frederick Darley) of Wingfield, Bray, County Wicklow and his wife Maria Louisa Darley (née West, daughter of silversmith, Matthew West of Dublin). Darley's father was a member of the Irish bar and according to Bennett, he was described by Lord St Leonards as "not only the best officer in the Court of Chancery in Ireland, but the best officer he had ever come across".

Darley attended the Royal School Dungannon (sometimes known as "Dungannon College") in County Tyrone, Ireland. One of his fellow students was an eventual Chief Justice of Victoria, George Higinbotham.

In July 1847 Darley commenced studying at Trinity College Dublin, and he graduated in July 1851 with a Bachelor of Arts (BA). He was called to the English bar at the King's Inn in January 1853 but returned to Ireland and practised law in the province of Munster. Darley married Lucy Forest Browne at Hunsdon, Hertfordshire, on 13 December 1860. Lucy was the sister of novelist Rolf Boldrewood (Thomas Alexander Browne).

== Emigration to Australia ==
Darley emigrated to Sydney in 1862. He was admitted to the NSW Bar on 2 June 1862 and was later appointed a Queen's Counsel (QC) in 1878. Biographer John Bennett states that Darley found his early years tiring and not particularly well remunerated, and that it was Darley's zeal rather than his legal skills that brought him to attention.

== Appointment as Chief Justice ==
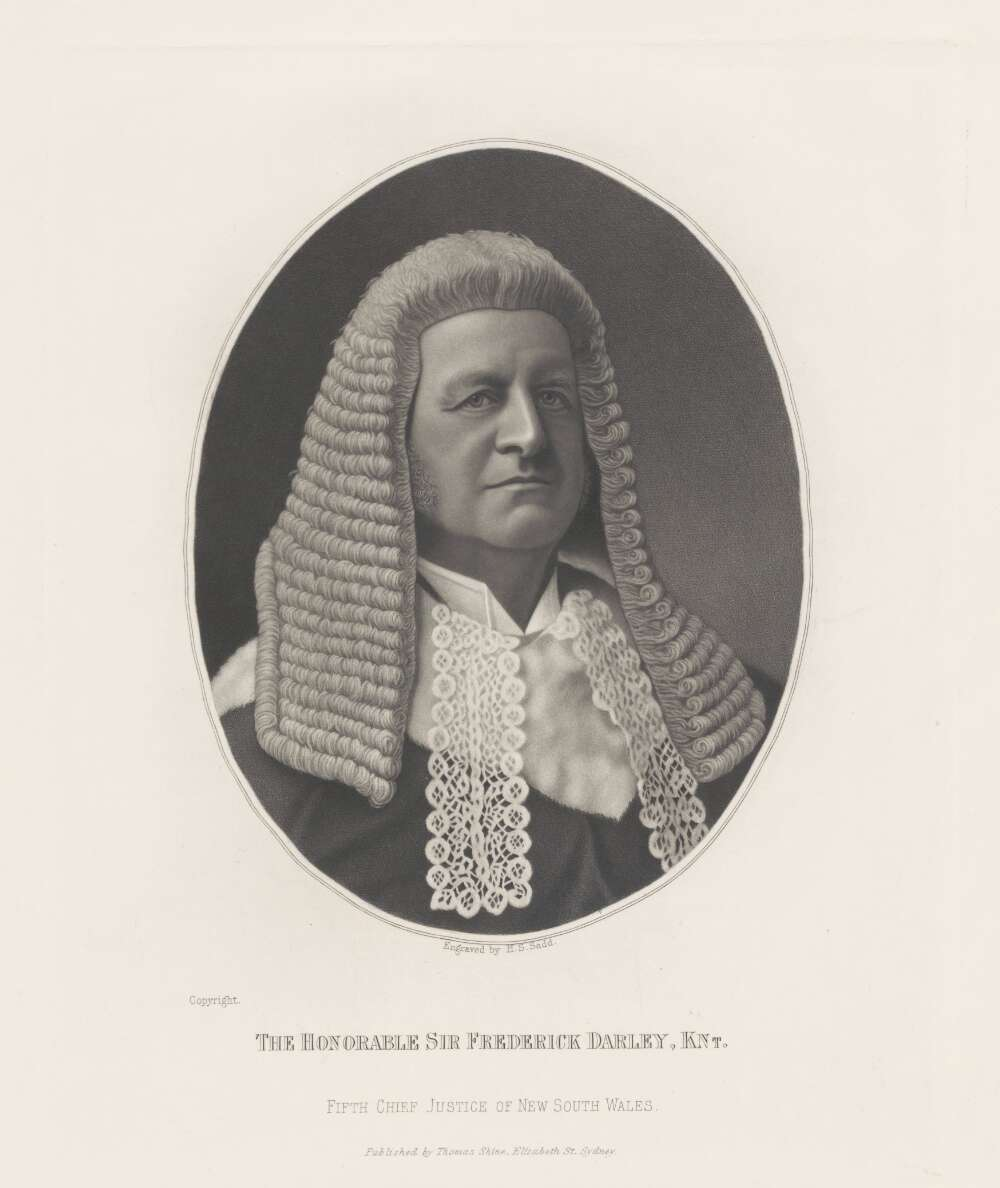
Etching of Frederick Matthew Darley, c. 1890

Darley became Chief Justice on 7 December 1886. Sir Samuel Way, Chief Justice of South Australia, described him "as in many respects the noblest figure we have ever had on the Australian bench".

Darley's longest period administering the government was from 1 November 1900 to 27 May 1902.

== Honours and later years ==
Darley was knighted in 1887, created a Knight Commander of the Order of St Michael and St George (KCMG) in 1897, and received the Knight Grand Cross of the Order of St Michael and St George (GCMG) on 15 May 1901.

He visited England in 1902 and was appointed a member of the Royal Commission set up to investigate the conduct of the Second Boer War (the Elgin Commission 1902–1903). He was also appointed a member of the privy council in 1905.

He died in London on 4 January 1910.

== See also ==
- List of judges of the Supreme Court of New South Wales

== Sources ==
- Alex Castles, A Legal History of Australia, Law Book Co, 1975.

Legal offices
Preceded by Sir Julian Salomons	Chief Justice of New South Wales; 1886 - 1910	Succeeded by Sir William Cullen
Government offices
Preceded by Sir Alfred Stephen	Lieutenant-Governor of New South Wales; 1891 - 1910	Succeeded by Sir William Cullen
