= Samuel Gordon (Australian politician) =

Australian politician

Personal details
- Born: Samuel Deane Gordon; 12 October 1811 Ballynahinch, Downshire, Ulster, Ireland
- Died: 24 July 1882 (aged 70) Double Bay, New South Wales, Australia

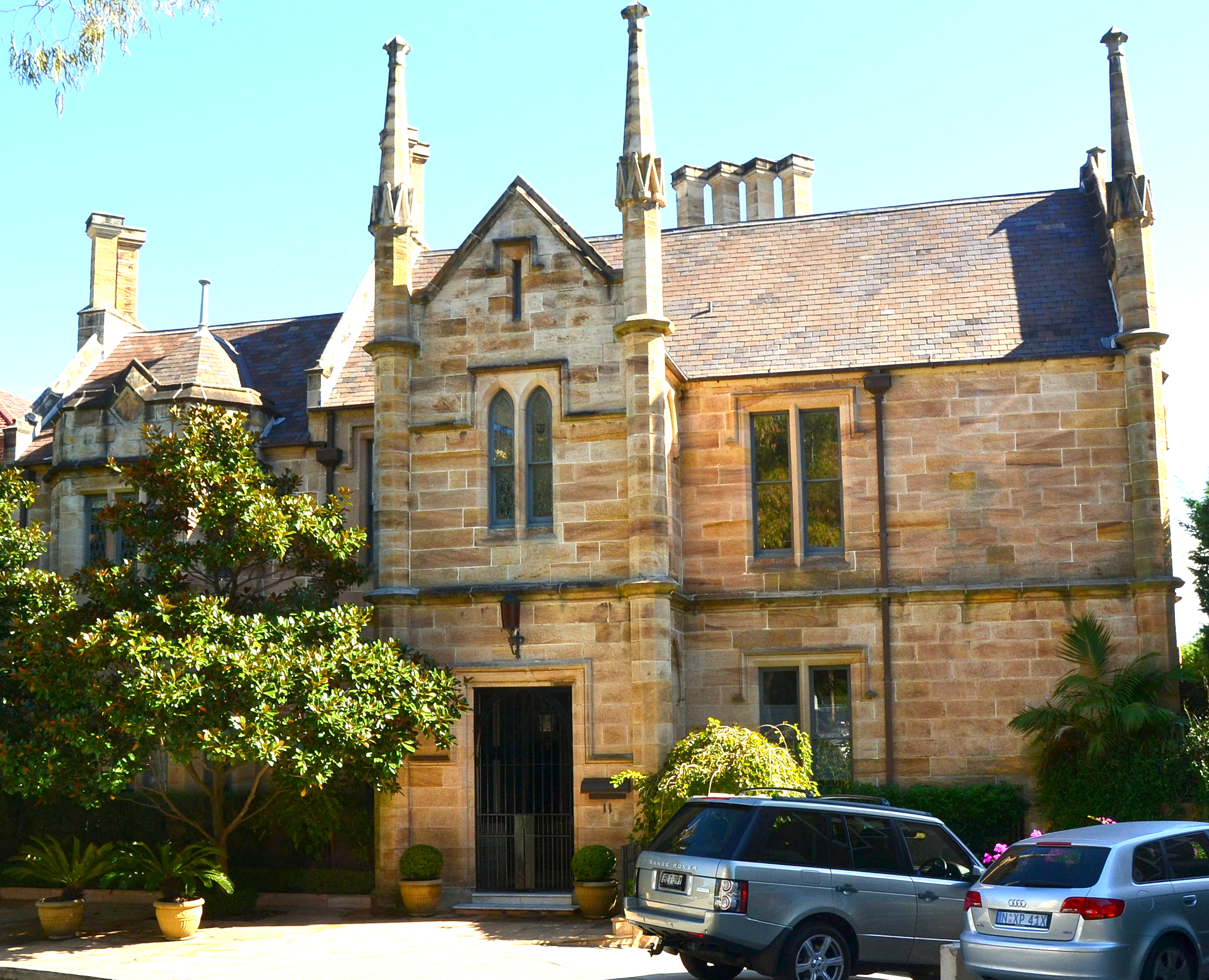
Gladswood House, Sydney, where Gordon lived for some time

Samuel Deane Gordon (12 October 1811 – 24 July 1882) was an Australian merchant, pastoralist and politician. He was a member of the New South Wales Legislative Council between 1861 and 1882. He was also a member of the New South Wales Legislative Assembly for three terms from 1856 until 1860.

== Early life ==
Gordon was the son of an Irish farmer, David Gordon and his wife Mary Deane. Gordon was educated in private schools in Ireland.

He emigrated to Sydney in 1829 and worked in a number of mercantile houses before commencing his own company, which was involved in trade between Van Diemen's Land and New South Wales. In 1840 Gordon established a large store in Liverpool, founded a brewery and acquired 50,000 acres of pastoral land on the Murrumbidgee River. In 1848, Gordon sold his assets in Liverpool at a great profit and became a wine and spirits merchant in Sydney.

During his later life, in partnership with Edward Flood, he gained control over 460 square miles (1,200 km^{2}) of pastoral land in Queensland. He was also the director of a number of colonial companies including English, Scottish & Australian Bank. Gordon was involved in numerous local organisations including the Presbyterian Church, St Andrew's College, Sydney and the YMCA.

== Colonial Parliament ==
In 1856 Gordon was elected as one of the three members for Durham in the first New South Wales Legislative Assembly. Gordon was a supporter of John Dunmore Lang, Charles Cowper and John Robertson particularly in questions of constitutional reform, education and land reform. He retained the seat at the 1858 election. The seat was abolished in 1859 and Gordon stood unsuccessfully for The Williams, and Morpeth in the 1858 elections, however he regained a seat in the Legislative Assembly at the 1859 Illawarra by-election. He declined to stand for the seat at the 1860 election, but accepted Cowper's invitation to join the Legislative Council as a life-time appointment in 1861. He expressed a desire to reform the council into an elective house.

New South Wales Legislative Assembly
New seat	Member for Durham; 1856 – 1859} Served alongside: Arnold, Jones	Seat abolished
Preceded by John Hargrave	Member for Illawarra; 1859 – 1860	Succeeded by Robert Haworth
