= Electoral district of Eastern Division of Camden =

Former state electoral district of New South Wales, Australia

Eastern Division of Camden was an electoral district for the Legislative Assembly in the then British colony of New South Wales from 1856 to 1857. Its name was changed to East Camden in January 1858, and it was largely replaced by the district of Illawarra in June 1859.

It elected two members simultaneously, with voters casting two votes and the first two candidates being elected. The electorate was situated in eastern Camden County, which adjoins the Cumberland County (Sydney Basin) to the south, including the Southern Highlands and, to the east, the Illawarra region.

== Members for Eastern Division of Camden ==
Two members (1856–1859)
Member 1	Party	Term	Member 2	Party	Term
John Marks	None	1856–1859	Henry Osborne	None	1856–1857
John Marks	None	1856–1859	Robert Owen	None	1858–1859
John Marks	None	1856–1859	John Hargrave	None	1859–1859

== Election results ==
1858 New South Wales colonial election: Eastern Division of Camden 22 January
Candidate	Votes	%
John Marks (re-elected 1)	789	35.4
Robert Owen (elected 2)	768	34.5
Henry Osborne (defeated)	632	28.4
George Alley	39	1.8
Total formal votes	2,228	100.0
Informal votes	0	0.0
Turnout	2,228	68.0
