= Robert Owen (Australian politician) =

Australian politician

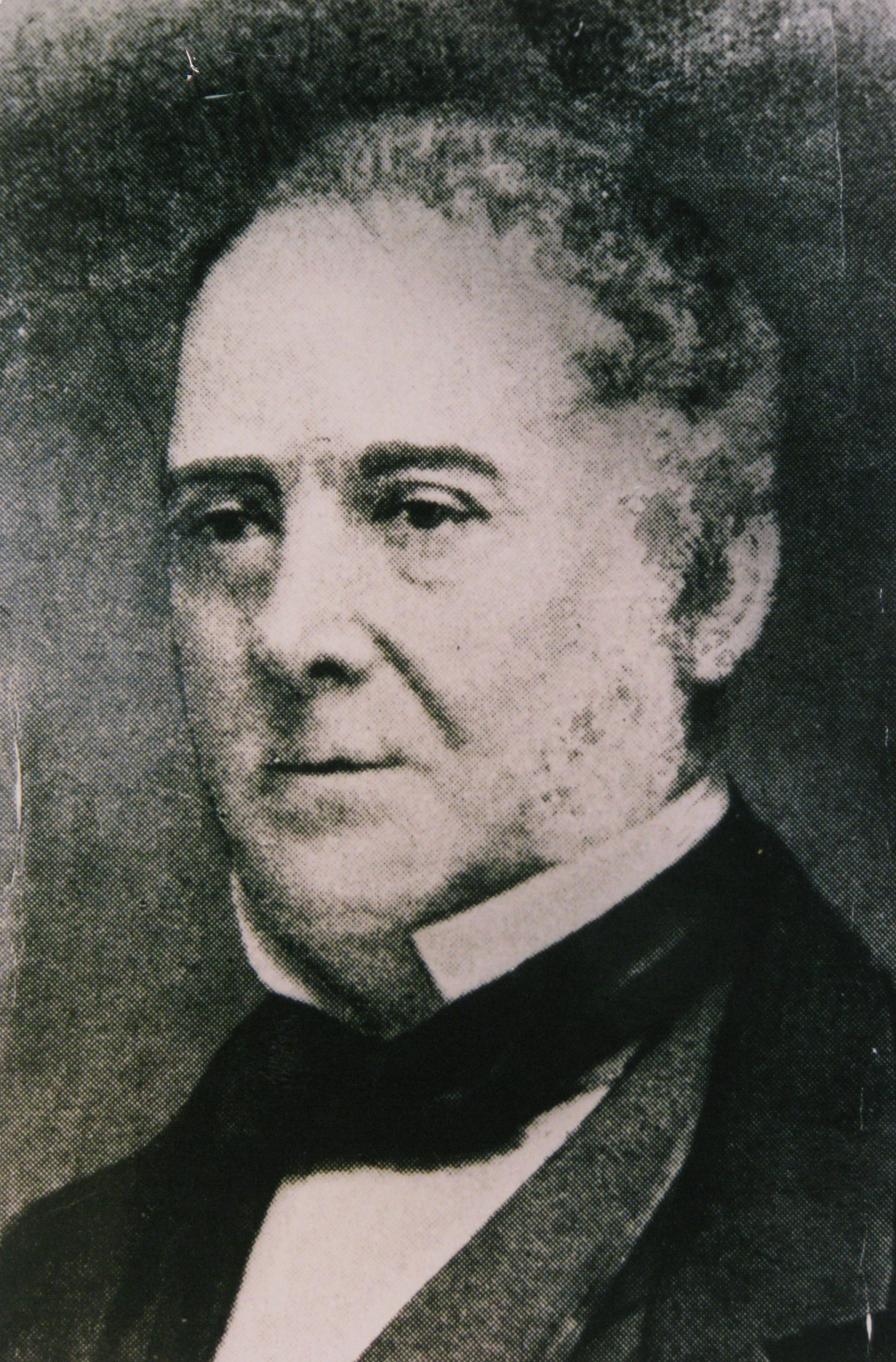
Robert Owen (undated)

Robert Owen (8 August 1799 – 25 November 1878) was a politician, solicitor and judge in colonial New South Wales; a member of the New South Wales Legislative Assembly, and later, the New South Wales Legislative Council.

== Early life ==
Owen was born in Tynemouth, England, and was articled to a solicitor in 1813. On 20 April 1820, he was admitted as a solicitor in England. Owen purchased a small schooner and sailed to Australia. Owen was the Representative of the Government in the Legislative Council in the a member of the New South Wales solicitors firm Carr, Rogers, and Owen.

== Politics ==
Owen was elected to the seat of East Camden in the Legislative Assembly at the election on 22 January 1858. He held this position until 3 March 1859, when seat was declared vacant on his acceptance of an appointment as a judge of the District Court, filling the position created by the resignation of John Hargrave. Hargrave in turn replaced Owen as the member for East Camden at the resulting by-election. Owen served on the district court until 30 June 1861.

On 8 December 1868, Owen was appointed to the Legislative Council, a position he held until his death on 25 November 1878. Owen was the Representative of the Government in the Legislative Council in the second Robertson and fifth Cowper ministries.

Parliament of New South Wales
New South Wales Legislative Assembly
Preceded by Henry Osborne	Member for East Camden; 22 January 1858 – 3 March 1859; Served alongside: John Marks	Succeeded by John Hargrave
New South Wales Legislative Council
Political offices
Preceded by Joseph Docker	Representative of the Government in the Legislative Council; 1868 – 1870	Succeeded by Julian Salomons
