= John Marks (Australian politician) =

Australian politician (1827–1885)

Vice-President of the Executive Council
- In office 14 January 1878 – 20 December 1878
- Preceded by: Joseph Docker
- Succeeded by: John Robertson

Representative of the Government in the Legislative Council
- In office 14 January 1878 – 20 December 1878
- Preceded by: Joseph Docker
- Succeeded by: John Robertson

Personal details
- Born: 24 November 1827 Coagh, County Tyrone, Ireland
- Died: 3 March 1885 (aged 57) Darling Point, New South Wales

John Marks (24 November 1827 – 3 March 1885) was an Australian farmer and politician. He was a member of the New South Wales Legislative Council between 1878 and 1885. He was also a member of the New South Wales Legislative Assembly for two terms from 1856 until 1859.

== Early life ==
Marks was the son of an Irish farmer who emigrated, with his family, to the Illawarra district when Marks was a few months old. After an elementary education in Sydney he became a successful farmer in Jamberoo near Kiama. By 1860, Marks had acquired substantial property in Sydney and had become independently wealthy. He was an alderman on Kiama Municipal Council between 1868 and 1874 and was the Mayor in 1870. Marks was also involved in numerous local organisations including the Presbyterian Church, Aboriginal Protection Board and Agricultural Society. He was a nephew of Samuel Charles who was also a Mayor of Kiama and a member of the Legislative Assembly and Legislative Council.

== Colonial Parliament ==
In 1856 Marks was elected as one of the two members for East Camden in the first New South Wales Legislative Assembly under responsible government. He was re-elected at the next election in 1858. Marks was a supporter of Charles Cowper but became disillusioned with him when Cowper failed to support the construction of a breakwater in Kiama. He did not stand as a candidate when his electorate was abolished before the 1859 election and he declined Cowper's invitation to join the Legislative Council in 1861.

== Government ==
On 23 January 1878 Marks became a life appointee to the Legislative Council when James Farnell appointed him to the position of Vice President of the Executive Council and Representative of the Government in the Legislative Council. In this position he was responsible for ensuring the passage of government legislation, including a contentious land bill, through the upper house. Marks lost the position when Farnell's government fell in December 1878 but he continued to attend the Legislative Council until his death. His infrequent speeches were noted for their moderation and 'gentlemanly style'.

New South Wales Legislative Assembly
Preceded by New Creation	Member for East Camden; 1856 – 1859; Served alongside: Osborne/Owen/Hargrave	Succeeded by Seat abolished
Political offices
Preceded by Joseph Docker	Vice-President of the Executive Council and Representative of the Government in the Legislative Council; 1878	Succeeded by John Robertson
