= 1858 New South Wales colonial election =

Colonial election for New South Wales, Australia in 1858

← 1856	13 January 1858 – 12 February 1858	1859 →

All 54 seats in the New South Wales Legislative Assembly 28 Assembly seats were needed for a majority
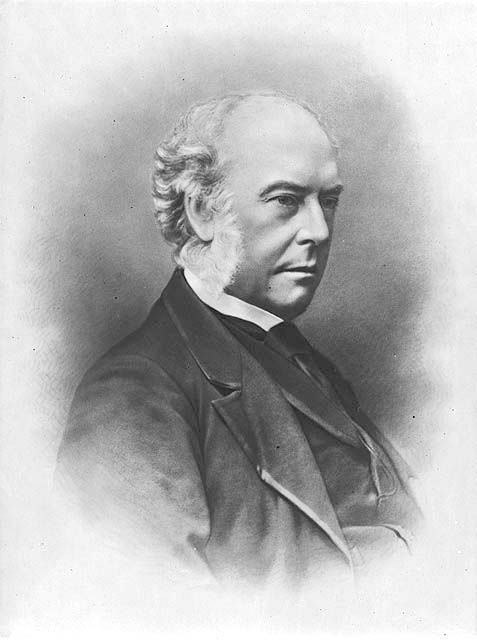
Leader	Charles Cowper
Leader's seat	Sydney City
- Results of the election, showing winners in each seat. Seats without circles indicate the electorate returned one member.
Premier before election
Charles Cowper
Elected Premier
Charles Cowper

The 1858 New South Wales colonial election was held between 13 January and 12 February 1858. This election was for all of the 54 seats in the New South Wales Legislative Assembly and it was conducted in 18 single-member constituencies, 13 2-member constituencies, two 3-member constituencies and one 4-member constituency, all with a first past the post system. Suffrage was limited to adult white males. The previous parliament of New South Wales was dissolved on 19 December 1857 by the Governor, Sir William Denison, on the advice of the Premier, Charles Cowper.

There was no recognisable party structure at this election; instead the government was determined by a loose, shifting factional system.

== Key dates ==
Date	Event
19 December 1857	The Legislative Assembly was dissolved, and writs were issued by the Governor to proceed with an election.
12 January to 1 February 1858	Nominations for candidates for the election closed.
13 January to 12 February 1858	Polling days.
23 March 1858	Opening of new Parliament.

== Results ==
New South Wales colonial election, 13 January 1858 – 12 February 1858 Legislative Assembly << 1856–1859 >>
Enrolled voters					
Votes cast	38,924		Turnout	43.09	−5.42
Informal votes	0		Informal	0.00	+0.00
Summary of votes by party
Party	Primary votes	%	Swing	Seats	Change
Total	38,924			54	

== See also ==
- Members of the New South Wales Legislative Assembly, 1858–1859
- Candidates of the 1858 New South Wales colonial election
