= Carenum (beetle) =

Scientific classification
- Kingdom: Animalia
- Phylum: Arthropoda
- Clade: Pancrustacea
- Class: Insecta
- Order: Coleoptera
- Suborder: Adephaga
- Family: Carabidae
- Subfamily: Scaritinae
- Tribe: Scaritini
- Genus: Carenum; Bonelli, 1813

Genus of beetles

Carenum is a genus of beetles in the family Carabidae, containing the following species:

- Carenum acutipes Sloane, 1897
- Carenum adelaidae (Blackburn, 1888)
- Carenum affine W. J. Macleay, 1864
- Carenum amplicolle Sloane, 1897
- Carenum angustipenne W. J. Macleay, 1871
- Carenum anthracinum W. J. Macleay, 1864
- Carenum batesi Masters, 1885
- Carenum bellum Sloane, 1917
- Carenum blackburni Sloane, 1916
- Carenum bonellii Brullé, 1835
- Carenum brevicolle Sloane, 1894
- Carenum breviforme H. W. Bates, 1874
- Carenum brevipenne (W. J. Macleay, 1887)
- Carenum brisbanense Laporte, 1867
- Carenum browni Sloane, 1916
- Carenum carbonarium Laporte, 1867
- Carenum cavipenne (H. W. Bates, 1874)
- Carenum cognatum Sloane, 1895
- Carenum concinnum Sloane, 1905
- Carenum convexum Chaudoir, 1868
- Carenum coracinum W. J. Macleay, 1865
- Carenum cordipenne Sloane, 1897
- Carenum coruscum W. J. Macleay, 1864
- Carenum cupreomarginatum Blackburn, 1888
- Carenum cupripenne W. J. Macleay, 1863
- Carenum decorum Sloane, 1888
- Carenum devastator Laporte, 1867
- Carenum devisii W. J. Macleay, 1883
- Carenum digglesi (W. J. Macleay, 1869)
- Carenum dispar W. J. Macleay, 1869
- Carenum distinctum W. J. Macleay, 1864
- Carenum ducale Sloane, 1905
- Carenum elegans W. J. Macleay, 1864
- Carenum emarginatum Sloane, 1900
- Carenum episcopale (Laporte, 1867)
- Carenum eximium Sloane, 1916
- Carenum felix Sloane, 1888
- Carenum filiforme (Laporte, 1867)
- Carenum floridum Sloane, 1917
- Carenum formosum Sloane, 1907
- Carenum foveolatum (W. J. Macleay, 1888)
- Carenum frenchi (Sloane, 1894)
- Carenum froggatti Sloane, 1897
- Carenum fugitivum Blackburn, 1888
- Carenum fulgidum Sloane, 1917
- Carenum gratiosum (Sloane, 1897)
- Carenum habile Sloane, 1892
- Carenum habitans Sloane, 1890
- Carenum imitator Sloane, 1897
- Carenum inconspicuum Blackburn, 1888
- Carenum ineditum W. J. Macleay, 1869
- Carenum interiore Sloane, 1888
- Carenum interruptum W. J. Macleay, 1865
- Carenum iridescens Sloane, 1894
- Carenum janthinum W. J. Macleay, 1883
- Carenum kingii W. J. Macleay, 1869
- Carenum laevigatum W. J. Macleay, 1864
- Carenum laevipenne W. J. Macleay, 1863
- Carenum laterale W. J. Macleay, 1865
- Carenum leai Sloane, 1916
- Carenum lepidum Sloane, 1890
- Carenum levissimum (Sloane, 1900)
- Carenum lobatum Sloane, 1900
- Carenum longulum Sloane, 1916
- Carenum macleayi Blackburn, 1888
- Carenum magnificum (W. J. Macleay, 1887)
- Carenum marginatum (Boisduval, 1835)
- Carenum montanum Sloane, 1916
- Carenum morosum Sloane, 1907
- Carenum nickerli F. J. M. L. Ancey, 1880
- Carenum nitidipes Sloane, 1916
- Carenum obsoletum W. J. Macleay, 1888
- Carenum occidentale Sloane, 1897
- Carenum odewahnii Laporte, 1867
- Carenum opacicolle Sloane, 1897
- Carenum optimum Sloane, 1895
- Carenum ovalee Sloane, 1900
- Carenum parvulum W. J. Macleay, 1873
- Carenum perplexum A. White, 1841
- Carenum planipenne W. J. Macleay, 1873
- Carenum politissimum Chaudoir, 1868
- Carenum politum Westwood, 1842
- Carenum porphyreum H. W. Bates, 1874
- Carenum pulchrum Sloane, 1897
- Carenum puncticolle W. J. Macleay, 1864
- Carenum punctipenne (W. J. Macleay, 1883)
- Carenum purpuratum (Laporte, 1867)
- Carenum purpureum Sloane, 1897
- Carenum pusillum W. J. Macleay, 1883
- Carenum quadripunctatum W. J. Macleay, 1863
- Carenum rectangulare W. J. Macleay, 1864
- Carenum reflexum Sloane, 1897
- Carenum regulare Sloane, 1900
- Carenum rutilans Sloane, 1907
- Carenum scaritoides Westwood, 1843
- Carenum serratipes Sloane, 1900
- Carenum simile W. J. Macleay, 1865
- Carenum smaragdulum Westwood, 1842
- Carenum speciosum Sloane, 1888
- Carenum splendens Laporte, 1867
- Carenum splendidum W. J. Macleay, 1863
- Carenum striatopunctatum W. J. Macleay, 1865
- Carenum subcostatum W. J. Macleay, 1865
- Carenum subcyaneum W. J. Macleay, 1869
- Carenum submetallicum W. J. Macleay, 1871
- Carenum subplanatum H. W. Bates, 1874
- Carenum subporcatulum W. J. Macleay, 1865
- Carenum sumptuosum Westwood, 1842
- Carenum terraereginae W. J. Macleay, 1883
- Carenum tibiale Sloane, 1894
- Carenum tinctilatum (E. Newman, 1838)
- Carenum transversicolle Chaudoir, 1868
- Carenum tumidipes Sloane, 1900
- Carenum venustum Sloane, 1897
- Carenum versicolor Sloane, 1897
- Carenum violaceum W. J. Macleay, 1864
- Carenum virescens Sloane, 1894
- Carenum viridiaeneum (W. J. Macleay, 1888)
- Carenum viridicolor (Sloane, 1895)
- Carenum viridissimum (W. J. Macleay, 1888)
