= A. angustior =

A. angustior may refer to:

- Abacetus angustior, a ground beetle found in Australia
- Agonum angustior, a synonym of Tanystoma maculicolle, a ground beetle found in Oregon and California
- Amara angustior, a synonym of Amara aurata, a ground beetle
- Andrena angustior, a mining bee found in the Palearctic
