= C. imitator =

C. imitator may refer to:

- Carenum imitator, a ground beetle species
- Carinotetraodon imitator, a pufferfish species
- Cirripectes imitator, a fish species
- Copelatus imitator, a diving beetle species
