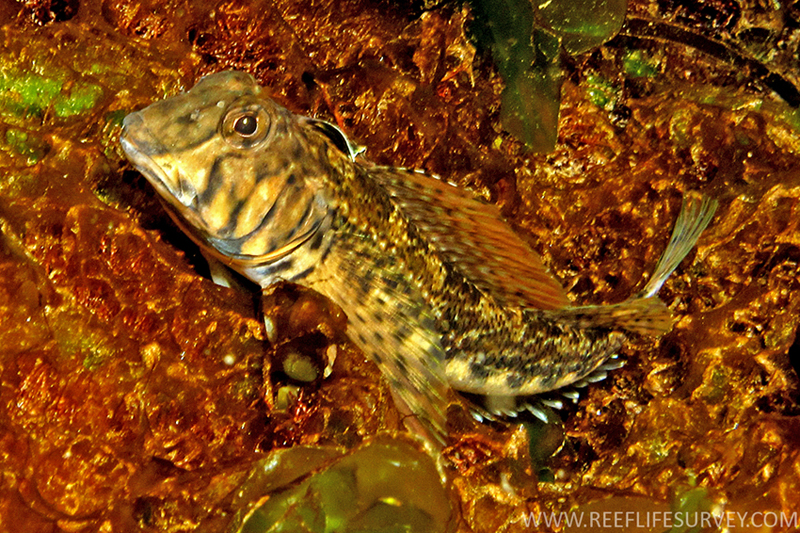

Conservation status
- Least Concern (IUCN 3.1)

Scientific classification
- Kingdom: Animalia
- Phylum: Chordata
- Class: Actinopterygii
- Order: Blenniiformes
- Family: Tripterygiidae
- Genus: Lepidoblennius
- Species: L. marmoratus

Binomial name
- Lepidoblennius marmoratus (W. J. Macleay, 1878)

Synonyms
- Tripterygium marmoratum W. J. Macleay, 1878

= Western jumping blenny =

Species of fish

The western jumping blenny (Lepidoblennius marmoratus) is a species of triplefin blenny in the genus Lepidoblennius. It was first described by William John Macleay in 1878.

== Description ==
The western jumping blenny has a body which is slightly compressed and has a steep snout and a naked head, with no scales. The body is coloured greyish to greenish-grey paler underneath. It is marked with dark vertical lines on the head, lines of small dark spots on the dorsal, caudal and pectoral fins and there are irregular blotches along the flanks. It grows to a maximum standard length of 11.4 centimetres (4.5 in). The western jumping blenny is identified from the allopatric but congeneric eastern jumping blenny by having a deep incision between the last spine of the first dorsal fin and the first spine of the second dorsal fin, as well as having two spines in the anal fin while the eastern has none.

== Distribution ==
The western jumping blenny is endemic to Australia where it occurs on the west and south coasts from 32° south in Western Australia to Kangaroo Island off South Australia. Its northernmost locality is the Swan River.

== Habitat and biology ==
The western jumping blenny is found in tidal pools and in rocky subtidal and intertidal areas. It occurs where there are algal covered rocks. They occur at depths of 0 to 3 metres (0.0 to 9.8 ft). They are frequently encountered out of the water but they can easily return to the water by flicking their tail.

== Etymology and taxonomy ==
William John Macleay described this species in 1878 with a type locality of King George Sound, Western Australia. The generic name means "scaled blenny" while the specific name marmoratus means "marbled" in reference to the yellowish colour mottled with black.
