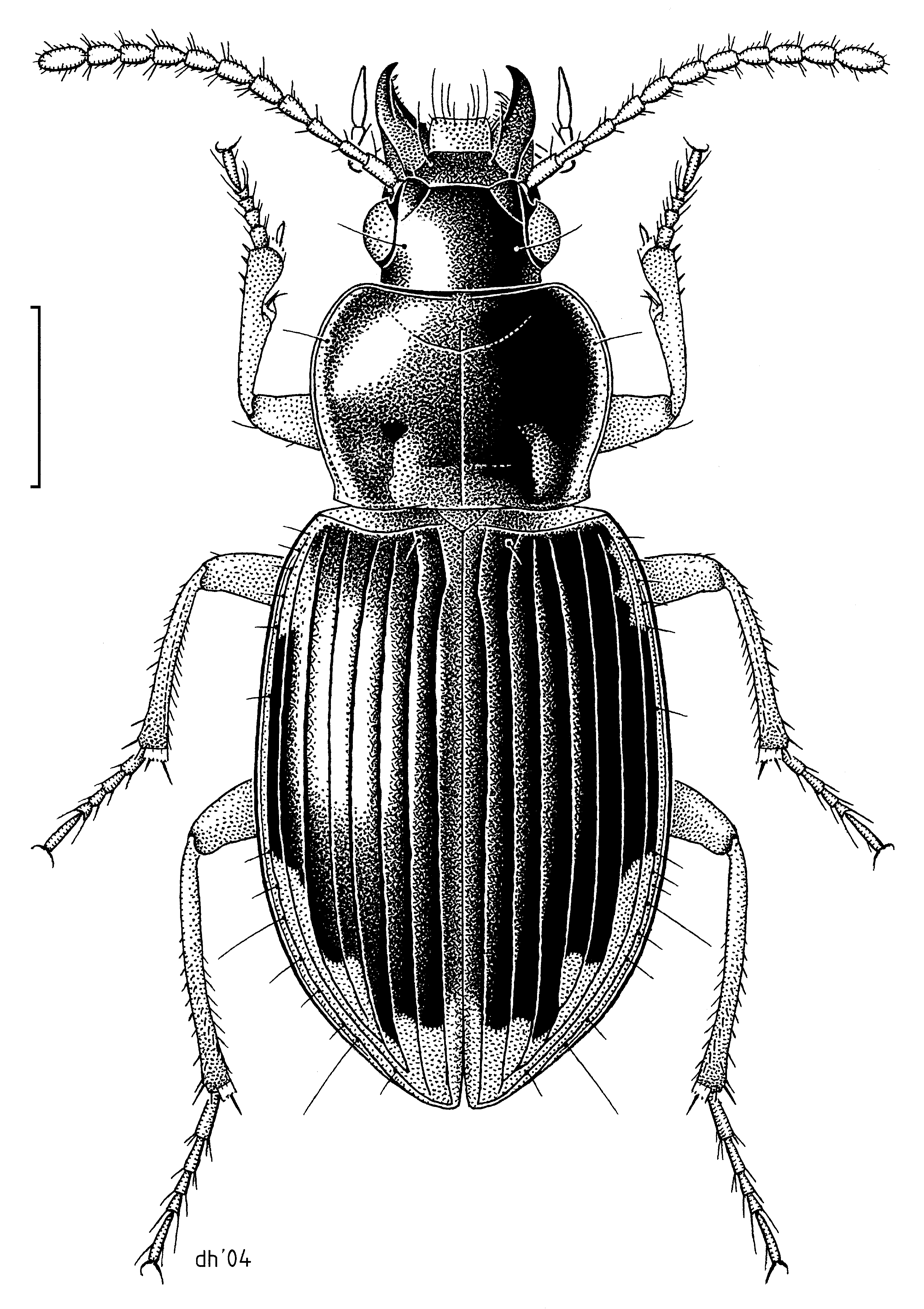
- Lecanomerus sharpi

Scientific classification
- Kingdom: Animalia
- Phylum: Arthropoda
- Class: Insecta
- Order: Coleoptera
- Suborder: Adephaga
- Family: Carabidae
- Subfamily: Harpalinae
- Tribe: Pelmatellini; Bates, 1882

= Pelmatellini =

Tribe of beetles

Pelmatellini is a tribe of ground beetles in the family Carabidae. There are about 8 genera and at least 90 described species in Pelmatellini.

== Genera ==
These eight genera belong to the tribe Pelmatellini:

- Hakaharpalus Larochelle & Larivière, 2005
- Kupeharpalus Larochelle & Larivière, 2005
- Lecanomerus Chaudoir, 1850
- Nemaglossa Solier, 1849
- Notospeophonus B.Moore, 1962
- Pelmatellus Bates, 1882
- Syllectus Bates, 1878
- Trachysarus Reed, 1874
