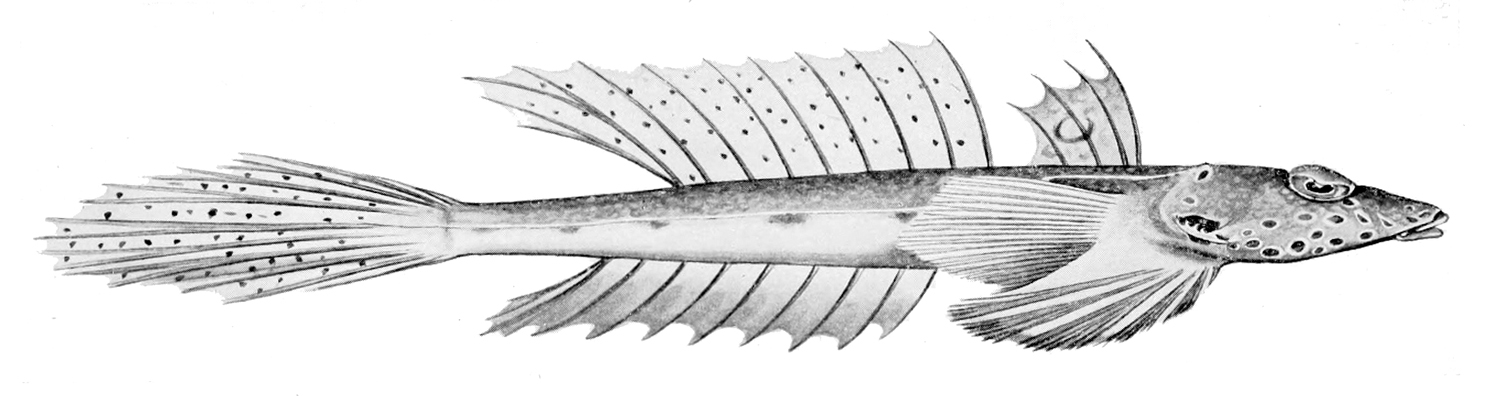
- Repomucenus calcaratus

Scientific classification
- Domain: Eukaryota
- Kingdom: Animalia
- Phylum: Chordata
- Class: Actinopterygii
- Order: Callionymiformes
- Family: Callionymidae
- Genus: Repomucenus; Whitley, 1931

Type species
- Callionymus calcaratus W. J. Macleay, 1881

= Repomucenus =

Genus of fishes

Repomucenus is a genus of dragonets native to the Indian Ocean and the western Pacific Ocean. This genus also includes one freshwater species (R. olidus).

== Species ==
There are currently five recognized species in this genus:

- Repomucenus calcaratus (W. J. Macleay, 1881) (Spotted stinkfish)
- Repomucenus huguenini (Bleeker, 1858 (Hugeunin's dragonet)
- Repomucenus olidus (Günther, 1873) (Chinese darter dragonet)
- Repomucenus ornatipinnis (Regan, 1905) (Japanese ornate dragonet)
- Repomucenus virgis (Jordan & Fowler, 1903) (Virgin dragonet)
