= Carenum anthracinum =

Scientific classification
- Kingdom: Animalia
- Phylum: Arthropoda
- Class: Insecta
- Order: Coleoptera
- Suborder: Adephaga
- Family: Carabidae
- Genus: Carenum
- Species: C. anthracinum

Binomial name
- Carenum anthracinum W. J. Macleay, 1864

Species of beetle

Carenum anthracinum is a species of ground beetle in the subfamily Scaritinae, native to Australia. It was described by William John Macleay in 1864.
