= Carenum foveolatum =

Scientific classification
- Kingdom: Animalia
- Phylum: Arthropoda
- Clade: Pancrustacea
- Class: Insecta
- Order: Coleoptera
- Suborder: Adephaga
- Family: Carabidae
- Tribe: Scaritini
- Genus: Carenum
- Species: C. foveolatum

Binomial name
- Carenum foveolatum (W. J. Macleay, 1888)

Species of beetle

Carenum foveolatum is a species of ground beetle in the subfamily Scaritinae, found in Australia. It was described by William John Macleay in 1888.

== Description ==
Carenum foveolatum is a ground beetle characterized by its glossy black exoskeleton and robust build typical of the subfamily Scaritinae. The species features distinct foveae (small pits) on its elytra and pronotum, which distinguish it from closely related members of the genus Carenum.

== Distribution and habitat ==
This species is endemic to Australia, primarily found in arid and semi-arid regions. It lives in soil, leaf litter, and under rocks, where it constructs shallow burrows.

== Behavior ==
Like most ground beetles, C. foveolatum is a nocturnal predator, feeding on small invertebrates and larvae.
