= Pterolophia pallida =

Scientific classification
- Kingdom: Animalia
- Phylum: Arthropoda
- Clade: Pancrustacea
- Class: Insecta
- Order: Coleoptera
- Suborder: Polyphaga
- Infraorder: Cucujiformia
- Family: Cerambycidae
- Genus: Pterolophia
- Species: P. pallida

Binomial name
- Pterolophia pallida (W. J. Macleay, 1886)

Synonyms
- Pterolophia pseudosellata Breuning, 1938; Praonetha pallida (W. J. Macleay, 1886)

Species of beetle

Pterolophia pallida is a species of beetle in the family Cerambycidae. It was described by William John Macleay in 1886.
