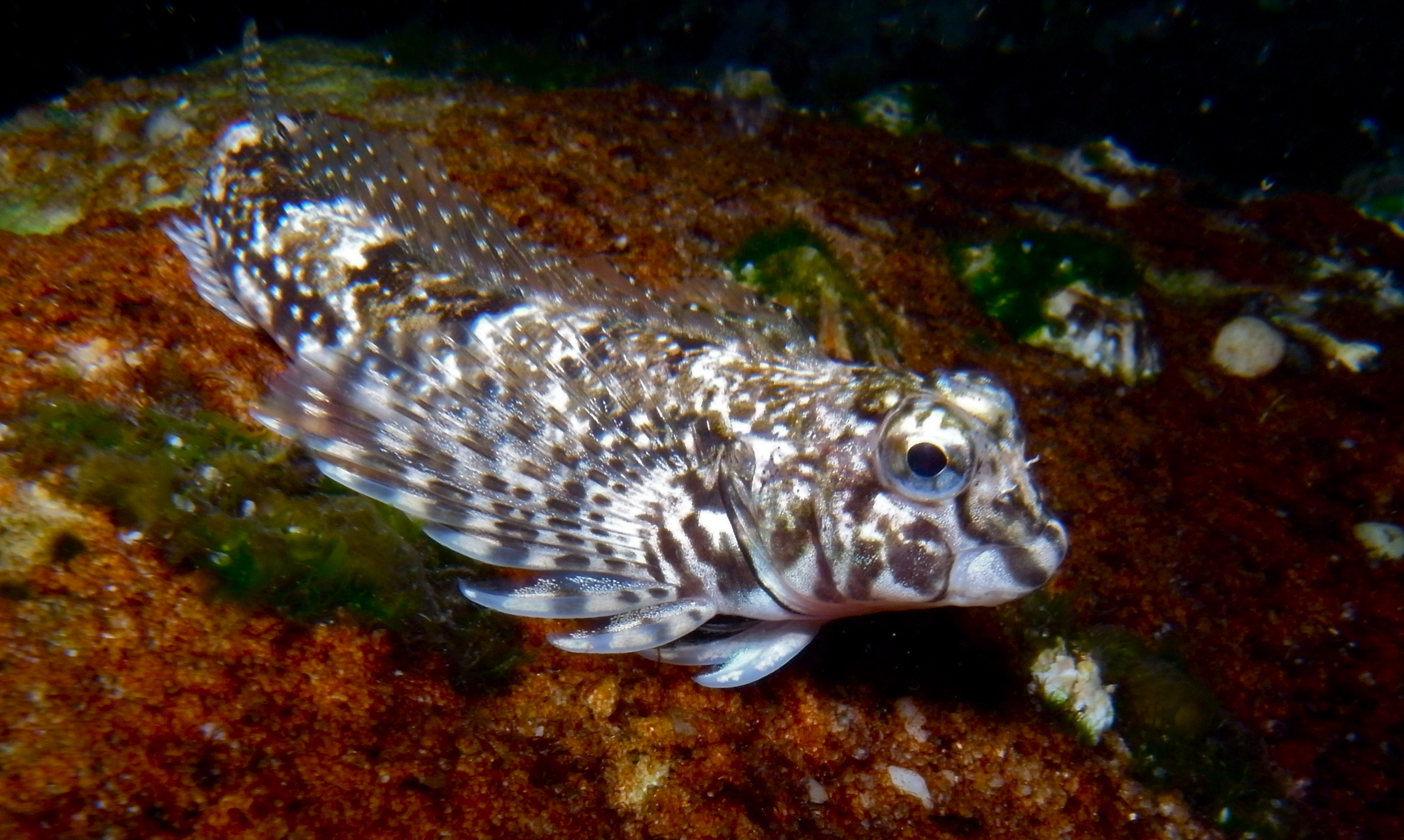
- Eastern Jumping Blenny (Lepidoblennius haplodactylus)

Scientific classification
- Kingdom: Animalia
- Phylum: Chordata
- Class: Actinopterygii
- Order: Blenniiformes
- Family: Tripterygiidae
- Subfamily: Tripterygiinae
- Genus: Lepidoblennius; Steindachner, 1867

Type species
- Lepidoblennius haplodactylus Steindachner, 1867

Species
- See text.

= Lepidoblennius =

Genus of fishes

Lepidoblennius is a genus of triplefins in the family Tripterygiidae. Both species occur in Australia.

== Species ==
There are currently two species in the genus Lepidoblennius:

- Eastern jumping blenny, Lepidoblennius haplodactylus Steindachner, 1867
- Western jumping blenny, Lepidoblennius marmoratus (W.J. Macleay, 1878)
