= Carenum batesi =

Scientific classification
- Kingdom: Animalia
- Phylum: Arthropoda
- Clade: Pancrustacea
- Class: Insecta
- Order: Coleoptera
- Suborder: Adephaga
- Family: Carabidae
- Genus: Carenum
- Species: C. batesi

Binomial name
- Carenum batesi Masters, 1885

Species of beetle

Carenum batesi is a species of ground beetle in the subfamily Scaritinae. It was described by Masters in 1885.
