= Mecyclothorax punctipennis =

Scientific classification
- Kingdom: Animalia
- Phylum: Arthropoda
- Class: Insecta
- Order: Coleoptera
- Suborder: Adephaga
- Family: Carabidae
- Genus: Mecyclothorax
- Species: M. punctipennis

Binomial name
- Mecyclothorax punctipennis (W. J. Macleay, 1871)

Species of beetle

Mecyclothorax punctipennis is a species of ground beetle in the subfamily Psydrinae. It was described by William John Macleay in 1871.
