= Othelais irrorata =

Scientific classification
- Kingdom: Animalia
- Phylum: Arthropoda
- Class: Insecta
- Order: Coleoptera
- Suborder: Polyphaga
- Infraorder: Cucujiformia
- Family: Cerambycidae
- Genus: Othelais
- Species: O. irrorata

Binomial name
- Othelais irrorata (W. J. Macleay, 1885)

Species of beetle

Othelais irrorata is a species of beetle in the family Cerambycidae. It was described by William John Macleay in 1885.
