= Carenum ianthinum =

Scientific classification
- Kingdom: Animalia
- Phylum: Arthropoda
- Class: Insecta
- Order: Coleoptera
- Suborder: Adephaga
- Family: Carabidae
- Subfamily: Scaritinae
- Tribe: Scaritini
- Genus: Carenum
- Species: C. ianthinum

Binomial name
- Carenum ianthinum W.J.Macleay, 1883

Synonyms
- Carenum janthinum Csiki, 1927

Species of beetle

Carenum ianthinum is a species in the beetle family Carabidae. It is found in Australia.
