= Carenum planipenne =

Scientific classification
- Kingdom: Animalia
- Phylum: Arthropoda
- Class: Insecta
- Order: Coleoptera
- Suborder: Adephaga
- Family: Carabidae
- Tribe: Scaritini
- Genus: Carenum
- Species: C. planipenne

Binomial name
- Carenum planipenne W. J. Macleay, 1873

Species of beetle

Carenum planipenne is a species of ground beetle in the subfamily Scaritinae, found in Australia. It was described by William John Macleay in 1873.
