= Pterolophia bizonata =

Scientific classification
- Kingdom: Animalia
- Phylum: Arthropoda
- Clade: Pancrustacea
- Class: Insecta
- Order: Coleoptera
- Suborder: Polyphaga
- Infraorder: Cucujiformia
- Family: Cerambycidae
- Genus: Pterolophia
- Species: P. bizonata

Binomial name
- Pterolophia bizonata W. J. Macleay, 1886

Synonyms
- Pterolophia pseudoduplicata Breuning, 1938

Species of beetle

Pterolophia bizonata is a species of beetle in the family Cerambycidae. It was described by William John Macleay in 1886.
