= Abacetus quadratipennis =

Scientific classification
- Kingdom: Animalia
- Phylum: Arthropoda
- Class: Insecta
- Order: Coleoptera
- Suborder: Adephaga
- Family: Carabidae
- Genus: Abacetus
- Species: A. quadratipennis

Binomial name
- Abacetus quadratipennis W.J.Macleay, 1888

Species of beetle

Abacetus quadratipennis is a species of ground beetle in the subfamily Pterostichinae. It was described by W.J.Macleay in 1888.
