= Lecanomerus angulatus =

Scientific classification
- Kingdom: Animalia
- Phylum: Arthropoda
- Clade: Pancrustacea
- Class: Insecta
- Order: Coleoptera
- Suborder: Adephaga
- Family: Carabidae
- Genus: Lecanomerus
- Species: L. angulatus

Binomial name
- Lecanomerus angulatus (Macleay, 1871)

Synonyms
- Acupalpus angulatus MacLeay, 1871

Species of beetle

Lecanomerus angulatus is a species of ground beetle. It is endemic to southeastern Queensland, Australia.
