= Carenum devisii =

Scientific classification
- Kingdom: Animalia
- Phylum: Arthropoda
- Class: Insecta
- Order: Coleoptera
- Suborder: Adephaga
- Family: Carabidae
- Genus: Carenum
- Species: C. devisii

Binomial name
- Carenum devisii W. J. Macleay, 1883

Species of beetle

Carenum devisii is a species of ground beetle in the subfamily Scaritinae, found in Australia. It was described by William John Macleay in 1883.
