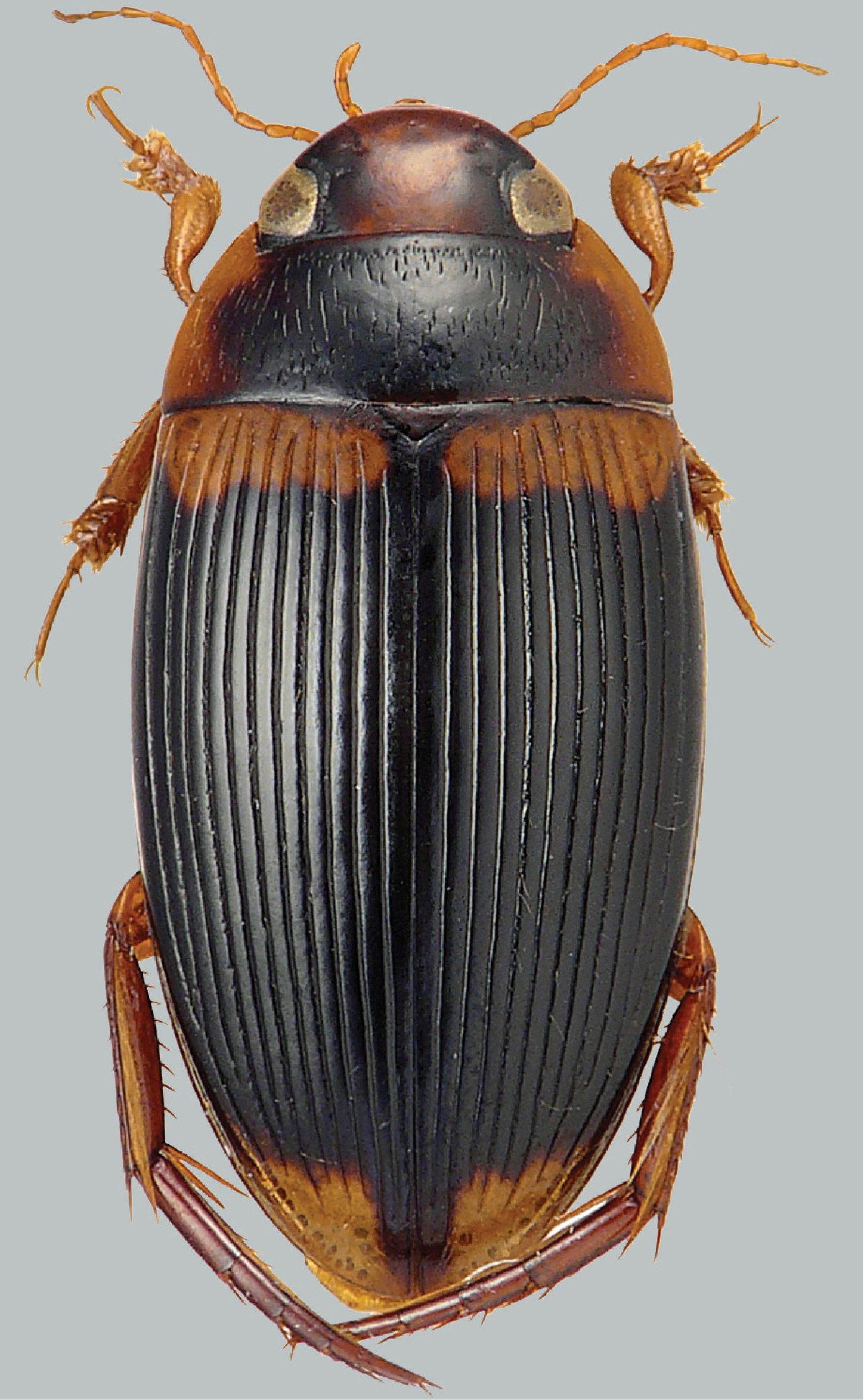

Scientific classification
- Kingdom: Animalia
- Phylum: Arthropoda
- Class: Insecta
- Order: Coleoptera
- Suborder: Adephaga
- Family: Dytiscidae
- Genus: Copelatus
- Species: C. irregularis

Binomial name
- Copelatus irregularis W. J. Macleay, 1871

= Copelatus irregularis =

Species of beetle

Copelatus irregularis is a species of diving beetle. It is part of the genus Copelatus in the subfamily Copelatinae of the family Dytiscidae. It was described by W. J. Macleay in 1871.
