= Pelmatellus caerulescens =

Scientific classification
- Kingdom: Animalia
- Phylum: Arthropoda
- Clade: Pancrustacea
- Class: Insecta
- Order: Coleoptera
- Suborder: Adephaga
- Family: Carabidae
- Genus: Pelmatellus
- Species: P. caerulescens

Binomial name
- Pelmatellus caerulescens Moret, 2005

Species of beetle

Pelmatellus caerulescens is a species of ground beetle in the genus Pelmatellus.
