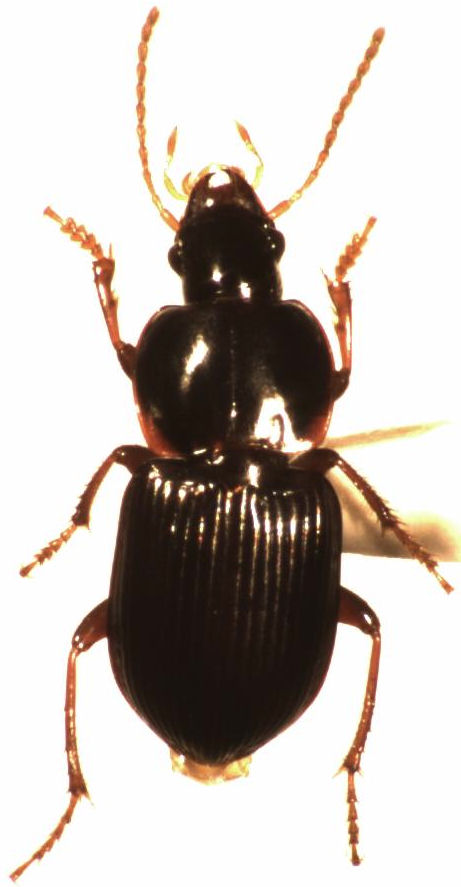
- Kupeharpalus embersoni

Scientific classification
- Domain: Eukaryota
- Kingdom: Animalia
- Phylum: Arthropoda
- Class: Insecta
- Order: Coleoptera
- Suborder: Adephaga
- Family: Carabidae
- Subfamily: Harpalinae
- Tribe: Pelmatellini
- Genus: Kupeharpalus; Larochelle & Larivière, 2005

= Kupeharpalus =

Genus of beetles

Kupeharpalus is a genus in the ground beetle family Carabidae. There are at least three described species in Kupeharpalus, found in New Zealand.

== Species ==
These three species belong to the genus Kupeharpalus:

- Kupeharpalus barrattae Larochelle & Larivière, 2005
- Kupeharpalus embersoni Larochelle & Larivière, 2005
- Kupeharpalus johnsi Larochelle & Larivière, 2005
