= Carenum inconspicuum =

Scientific classification
- Kingdom: Animalia
- Phylum: Arthropoda
- Class: Insecta
- Order: Coleoptera
- Suborder: Adephaga
- Family: Carabidae
- Genus: Carenum
- Species: C. inconspicuum

Binomial name
- Carenum inconspicuum Blackburn, 1888

Species of beetle

Carenum inconspicuum is a species of ground beetle in the subfamily Scaritinae. It was described by Blackburn in 1888.
