= Carenum odewahnii =

Scientific classification
- Kingdom: Animalia
- Phylum: Arthropoda
- Class: Insecta
- Order: Coleoptera
- Suborder: Adephaga
- Family: Carabidae
- Genus: Carenum
- Species: C. odewahnii

Binomial name
- Carenum odewahnii Laporte, 1867

Species of beetle

Carenum odewahnii is a species of ground beetle in the subfamily Scaritinae. It was described by Castelnau in 1867.
