= Othelais tesselata =

Scientific classification
- Kingdom: Animalia
- Phylum: Arthropoda
- Class: Insecta
- Order: Coleoptera
- Suborder: Polyphaga
- Infraorder: Cucujiformia
- Family: Cerambycidae
- Genus: Othelais
- Species: O. tesselata

Binomial name
- Othelais tesselata (Pascoe, 1866)

Species of beetle

Othelais tesselata is a species of beetle in the family Cerambycidae. It was described by Pascoe in 1866.
