= Electoral district of Lachlan and Lower Darling =

Former state electoral district of New South Wales, Australia

Lachlan and Lower Darling New South Wales—Legislative Assembly
- State: New South Wales
- Created: July 1856
- Abolished: December 1859
- Namesake: Lachlan River, Darling River

Lachlan and Lower Darling was an electoral district of the Legislative Assembly in the Australian state of New South Wales. It existed between 1856 and 1859, and was named after the Lachlan and Darling Rivers. It elected two members simultaneously. In 1859 it was replaced by Lachlan.

== Members for Lachlan and Lower Darling ==
Member	Party	Term	Member	Party	Term
William Macleay	None	1856–1859	James Garland	None	1856–1857
William Macleay	None	1856–1859	John Paterson	None	1858–1859

== Election results ==
=== 1856 ===
1856 New South Wales colonial election: Lachlan and Lower Darling
Candidate	Votes	%
James Garland (elected 1)	134	37.6
William Macleay (elected 2)	129	36.2
John Hardy	63	17.7
Daniel Henry Thorn	30	8.4
Total formal votes	356	100.0
Informal votes	0	0.0
Turnout	182	49.32

Polling was conducted on 19 April 1856. Macleay had represented Pastoral Districts of Lachlan and Lower Darling in the old Legislative Council.

=== 1858 ===
1858 New South Wales colonial election: Lachlan and Lower Darling 11 February
Candidate	Votes	%
William Macleay (re-elected)	show of hands	
John Paterson (elected)	show of hands	
Edward Flood		
John Egan		

The sitting member James Garland did not contest the election. The show of hands was in favour of William Macleay and John Paterson and while the supporters of Edward Flood and John Egan called for a poll, they did not have the six electors that were required. Edward Flood successfully contested Cumberland (South Riding).
