= Pelmatellus obtusa =

Scientific classification
- Kingdom: Animalia
- Phylum: Arthropoda
- Clade: Pancrustacea
- Class: Insecta
- Order: Coleoptera
- Suborder: Adephaga
- Family: Carabidae
- Subfamily: Harpalinae
- Genus: Pelmatellus
- Species: P. obtusa

Binomial name
- Pelmatellus obtusa Bates, 1882

Synonyms
- Pelmatellus obtusus

Species of beetle

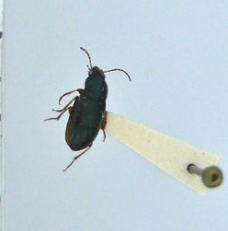
Pelmatellus obtusa in Mexico

Pelmatellus obtusa is a species of ground beetle in the family Carabidae.
