= Carenum purpuratum =

Scientific classification
- Kingdom: Animalia
- Phylum: Arthropoda
- Class: Insecta
- Order: Coleoptera
- Suborder: Adephaga
- Family: Carabidae
- Genus: Carenum
- Species: C. purpuratum

Binomial name
- Carenum purpuratum (Laporte, 1867)

Species of beetle

Carenum purpuratum is a species of ground beetle in the subfamily Scaritinae. It was described by Castelnau in 1867.
