= Carenum sumptuosum =

Scientific classification
- Kingdom: Animalia
- Phylum: Arthropoda
- Class: Insecta
- Order: Coleoptera
- Suborder: Adephaga
- Family: Carabidae
- Genus: Carenum
- Species: C. sumptuosum

Binomial name
- Carenum sumptuosum Westwood, 1842

Species of beetle

Carenum sumptuosum is a species of ground beetle in the subfamily Scaritinae. It was described by John O. Westwood in 1842.
