= Carenum perplexum =

Scientific classification
- Kingdom: Animalia
- Phylum: Arthropoda
- Class: Insecta
- Order: Coleoptera
- Suborder: Adephaga
- Family: Carabidae
- Genus: Carenum
- Species: C. perplexum

Binomial name
- Carenum perplexum A. White, 1841

Species of beetle

Carenum perplexum is a species of ground beetle in the subfamily Scaritinae. It was described by White in 1841.
