= Nemaglossa =

Scientific classification
- Domain: Eukaryota
- Kingdom: Animalia
- Phylum: Arthropoda
- Class: Insecta
- Order: Coleoptera
- Suborder: Adephaga
- Family: Carabidae
- Subfamily: Harpalinae
- Tribe: Pelmatellini
- Genus: Nemaglossa; Solier, 1849
- Species: N. brevis

Binomial name
- Nemaglossa brevis Solier, 1849

Synonyms
- Nematoglossa Gemminger & Harold, 1868

Species of beetle

Nemaglossa is a genus in the ground beetle family Carabidae. This genus has a single species, Nemaglossa brevis. It is found in Chile.
