= Trachysarus =

Scientific classification
- Domain: Eukaryota
- Kingdom: Animalia
- Phylum: Arthropoda
- Class: Insecta
- Order: Coleoptera
- Suborder: Adephaga
- Family: Carabidae
- Subfamily: Harpalinae
- Tribe: Pelmatellini
- Genus: Trachysarus; Reed, 1874

Genus of beetles

Trachysarus is a genus of in the beetle family Carabidae. There are about 10 described species in Trachysarus.

== Species ==
These 10 species belong to the genus Trachysarus:

- Trachysarus antarcticus Reed, 1874 (Chile and Argentina)
- Trachysarus basalis Jeannel, 1955 (Chile)
- Trachysarus bicolor Jeannel, 1955 (Chile)
- Trachysarus emdeni Jeannel, 1955 (Chile)
- Trachysarus kuscheli Jeannel, 1955 (Chile)
- Trachysarus neopallipes Noonan, 1976 (Chile)
- Trachysarus ovalipennis Jeannel, 1955 (Chile)
- Trachysarus pictipes Straneo, 1958 (Chile)
- Trachysarus punctiger Andrewes, 1931 (Chile)
- Trachysarus sericeus Andrewes, 1931 (Chile)
