= Carenum tinctilatum =

Scientific classification
- Kingdom: Animalia
- Phylum: Arthropoda
- Class: Insecta
- Order: Coleoptera
- Suborder: Adephaga
- Family: Carabidae
- Genus: Carenum
- Species: C. tinctilatum

Binomial name
- Carenum tinctilatum (E. Newman, 1838)

Species of beetle

Carenum tinctilatum (digger carab beetle) is a species of ground beetle in the subfamily Scaritinae. It was described by Newman in 1838. It is found in Australia.
