= Carenum bonellii =

Scientific classification
- Kingdom: Animalia
- Phylum: Arthropoda
- Class: Insecta
- Order: Coleoptera
- Suborder: Adephaga
- Family: Carabidae
- Genus: Carenum
- Species: C. bonellii

Binomial name
- Carenum bonellii Brullé, 1835

Species of beetle

Carenum bonellii is a species of ground beetle in the subfamily Scaritinae. It was described by Brulle in 1835. Carenum bonellii live in Australia, with a high abundance on the east coast of the country.
