= Pelmatellus balli =

Scientific classification
- Domain: Eukaryota
- Kingdom: Animalia
- Phylum: Arthropoda
- Class: Insecta
- Order: Coleoptera
- Suborder: Adephaga
- Family: Carabidae
- Subfamily: Harpalinae
- Genus: Pelmatellus
- Species: P. balli

Binomial name
- Pelmatellus balli Goulet, 1974

Species of beetle

Pelmatellus balli is a species of ground beetle in the genus Pelmatellus.
