= James Garland (Australian politician) =

Australian politician

Personal details
- Born: 13 August 1813 Ellon, Aberdeenshire
- Died: 17 November 1904 (aged 91) Tamworth, New South Wales

James Garland (13 August 1813 – 17 November 1904) was an Australian politician and a member of the New South Wales Legislative Assembly for one term between 1856 and 1857.

== Early life ==
Garland was born in Aberdeenshire and was the son of a tenant farmer. He was mentored by two Presbyterian clergymen and through their sponsorship he was educated at King's College, Aberdeen. Garland purchased an army commission and was transferred with the 28th Regiment to New South Wales in 1836. He left the army in 1837 and accrued significant pastoral interests. With Edward Bingham he established a stock and station agency in Tamworth but was bankrupted through this endeavour in 1861. He was the Superintendent of Police in Tamworth between 1862 and 1882.

== Colonial Parliament ==
Garland was elected to the first New South Wales Legislative Assembly convened after the establishment of responsible self-government in 1856. He represented the 2 member seat of Lachlan and Lower Darling. He did not hold a ministerial or parliamentary position, and did not contest the 1858 election. Two further attempts at election to the Assembly were unsuccessful.

New South Wales Legislative Assembly
Preceded by First election	Member for Lachlan and Lower Darling; 1856 – 1858; Served alongside: Macleay	Succeeded by John Paterson
