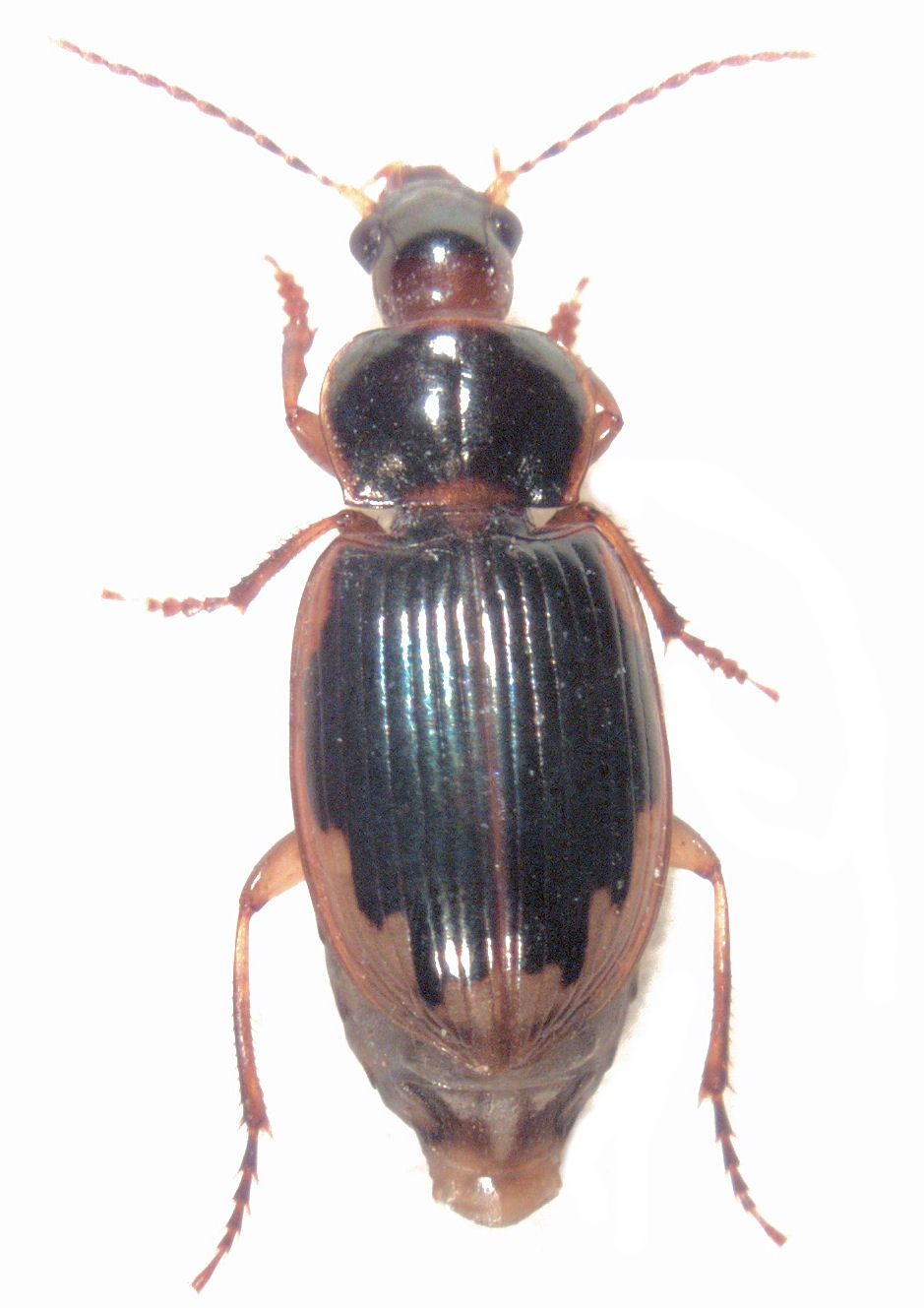
- Lecanomerus sharpi

Scientific classification
- Kingdom: Animalia
- Phylum: Arthropoda
- Class: Insecta
- Order: Coleoptera
- Suborder: Adephaga
- Family: Carabidae
- Subfamily: Harpalinae
- Tribe: Pelmatellini
- Genus: Lecanomerus; Chaudoir, 1850

Synonyms
- Odontagonum Darlington, 1956; Thenarotes Bates, 1878; Veradia Laporte, 1867

= Lecanomerus =

Genus of beetles

Lecanomerus is a genus in the beetle family Carabidae. There are more than 30 described species in Lecanomerus.

== Species ==
These 38 species belong to the genus Lecanomerus:

- Lecanomerus aberrans W.J.MacLeay, 1871 (Australia)
- Lecanomerus angulatus (W.J.MacLeay, 1871) (Australia)
- Lecanomerus angustior Darlington, 1968 (Indonesia and New Guinea)
- Lecanomerus ater (W.J.MacLeay, 1871) (Australia)
- Lecanomerus atriceps (W.J.MacLeay, 1871) (Indonesia, Australia, and New Zealand)
- Lecanomerus australis (Blackburn, 1888) (Australia)
- Lecanomerus bicolor (Sloane, 1900) (Australia)
- Lecanomerus brisbanensis (Laporte, 1867) (Australia)
- Lecanomerus carteri Sloane, 1911 (Australia)
- Lecanomerus concolor (W.J.MacLeay, 1871) (Australia)
- Lecanomerus curtus Sloane, 1911 (Australia)
- Lecanomerus discoidalis (Blackburn, 1888) (Australia)
- Lecanomerus domesticus (Montrouzier, 1860)
- Lecanomerus insignitus Broun, 1880 (New Zealand)
- Lecanomerus lateridens (Fauvel, 1882) (New Caledonia)
- Lecanomerus latimanus Bates, 1874 (New Zealand)
- Lecanomerus latior Darlington, 1968 (New Guinea)
- Lecanomerus limbatus B.Moore, 1967 (Australia)
- Lecanomerus lindi Blackburn, 1888 (Australia)
- Lecanomerus lucidus Sloane, 1917 (Australia)
- Lecanomerus major Blackburn, 1892 (Australia)
- Lecanomerus marrisi Larochelle & Larivière, 2005 (New Zealand)
- Lecanomerus medius Darlington, 1968 (New Guinea)
- Lecanomerus niger (Darlington, 1956) (Australia)
- Lecanomerus obesulus Bates, 1878 (New Zealand)
- Lecanomerus obtusus (Sloane, 1920) (Australia)
- Lecanomerus parvicollis (Fauvel, 1882) (New Caledonia)
- Lecanomerus recticollis (W.J.MacLeay, 1888) (Australia)
- Lecanomerus ruficeps W.J.MacLeay, 1871 (Australia)
- Lecanomerus scalaris (Fauvel, 1882) (New Caledonia)
- Lecanomerus sharpi (Csiki, 1932) (New Zealand)
- Lecanomerus speluncarius (B.Moore, 1967) (Australia)
- Lecanomerus striatus Blackburn, 1892 (Australia)
- Lecanomerus tasmanicus (Bates, 1878) (Australia)
- Lecanomerus trapezus (Fauvel, 1882) (New Caledonia)
- Lecanomerus verticalis (Erichson, 1842) (Australia and New Zealand)
- Lecanomerus vestigialis (Erichson, 1842) (Australia and New Zealand)
- Lecanomerus victoriensis (Blackburn, 1891) (Australia)
