= Carenum occidentale =

Scientific classification
- Kingdom: Animalia
- Phylum: Arthropoda
- Class: Insecta
- Order: Coleoptera
- Suborder: Adephaga
- Family: Carabidae
- Genus: Carenum
- Species: C. occidentale

Binomial name
- Carenum occidentale Sloane, 1897

Species of beetle

Carenum occidentale is a species of ground beetle in the subfamily Scaritinae. It was described by Sloane in 1897.
