= Notospeophonus =

Scientific classification
- Domain: Eukaryota
- Kingdom: Animalia
- Phylum: Arthropoda
- Class: Insecta
- Order: Coleoptera
- Suborder: Adephaga
- Family: Carabidae
- Subfamily: Harpalinae
- Tribe: Pelmatellini
- Genus: Notospeophonus; B.Moore, 1962

Genus of beetles

Notospeophonus is a genus in the ground beetle family Carabidae. There are at least three described species in Notospeophonus, found in Australia.

== Species ==
These three species belong to the genus Notospeophonus:

- Notospeophonus castaneus B.Moore, 1962
- Notospeophonus jasperensis B.Moore, 1964
- Notospeophonus pallidus B.Moore, 1964
