= Carenum porphyreum =

Scientific classification
- Kingdom: Animalia
- Phylum: Arthropoda
- Class: Insecta
- Order: Coleoptera
- Suborder: Adephaga
- Family: Carabidae
- Genus: Carenum
- Species: C. porphyreum

Binomial name
- Carenum porphyreum H. W. Bates, 1874

Species of beetle

Carenum porphyreum is a species of ground beetle in the subfamily Scaritinae. It was described by Henry Walter Bates in 1874.
