= Carenum versicolor =

Scientific classification
- Kingdom: Animalia
- Phylum: Arthropoda
- Class: Insecta
- Order: Coleoptera
- Suborder: Adephaga
- Family: Carabidae
- Genus: Carenum
- Species: C. versicolor

Binomial name
- Carenum versicolor Sloane, 1897

Species of beetle

Carenum versicolor is a species of ground beetles in the subfamily Scaritinae. It was described by Sloane in 1897. It is found in Australia.
