= Carenum scaritoides =

Scientific classification
- Kingdom: Animalia
- Phylum: Arthropoda
- Class: Insecta
- Order: Coleoptera
- Suborder: Adephaga
- Family: Carabidae
- Genus: Carenum
- Species: C. scaritoides

Binomial name
- Carenum scaritoides Westwood, 1843

Species of beetle

Carenum scaritoides is a species of ground beetle in the subfamily Scaritinae. It was described by Westwood in 1843.
