= Othelais histrio =

Scientific classification
- Kingdom: Animalia
- Phylum: Arthropoda
- Class: Insecta
- Order: Coleoptera
- Suborder: Polyphaga
- Infraorder: Cucujiformia
- Family: Cerambycidae
- Genus: Othelais
- Species: O. histrio

Binomial name
- Othelais histrio (Pascoe, 1859)

Species of beetle

Othelais histrio is a species of beetle in the family Cerambycidae. It was described by Pascoe in 1859.
