= John Paterson (Australian politician) =

Australian colonial politician

Member of the New South Wales Parliament for Lachlan and Lower Darling
- In office 26 January 1858 – 11 April 1859
- Preceded by: James Garland
- Succeeded by: Seat abolished

Personal details
- Born: 8 December 1831 Lesmahagow, Lanarkshire, Scotland
- Died: 9 August 1871 (aged 39) Illalong, New South Wales, Australia
- Relatives: Banjo Paterson (nephew)
- Occupation: Pastoralist

John Paterson (8 December 1831 – 9 August 1871) was a Scottish-born Australian politician in the New South Wales Legislative Assembly.

== Early life ==
Paterson was born in Clydevale, Lesmahagow, Lanarkshire in 1831. He took his name from his father, Captain John Paterson, a soldier. His mother was Ann Howison. Paterson arrived in New South Wales in 1850. He was a pastoralist and was a partner in several runs.

== Politics ==
James Garland had served alongside William Macleay in the two member constituency of Lachlan and Lower Darling in the first New South Wales parliament from 1856 to 1858. At the 1858 election Garland did not recontest. Nominations for the seat of Lachlan and Lower Darling closed on 25 January 1858. The report on the close of nominations states that both John Piper Egan and Edward Flood were nominated in their absence, and both had been listed by The Sydney Morning Herald, as candidates in this seat. However, the nominators were unable to muster the six persons required to call for a poll and Paterson and Macleay were elected unopposed. Paterson served in the second parliament from 1858 to 1859. He did not recontest the 1859 election.

== Personal life ==
Paterson married Emily Susan Barton in 1861 at Molong and together they had four children, two daughters and two sons. His nephew is the renowned poet and author Banjo Paterson.

== Death ==
Paterson died in Illalong, New South Wales on 9 August 1871.

New South Wales Legislative Assembly
Preceded by James Garland	Member for Lachlan and Lower Darling; 1858 – 1859; Served alongside: Macleay	Succeeded by Abolished
