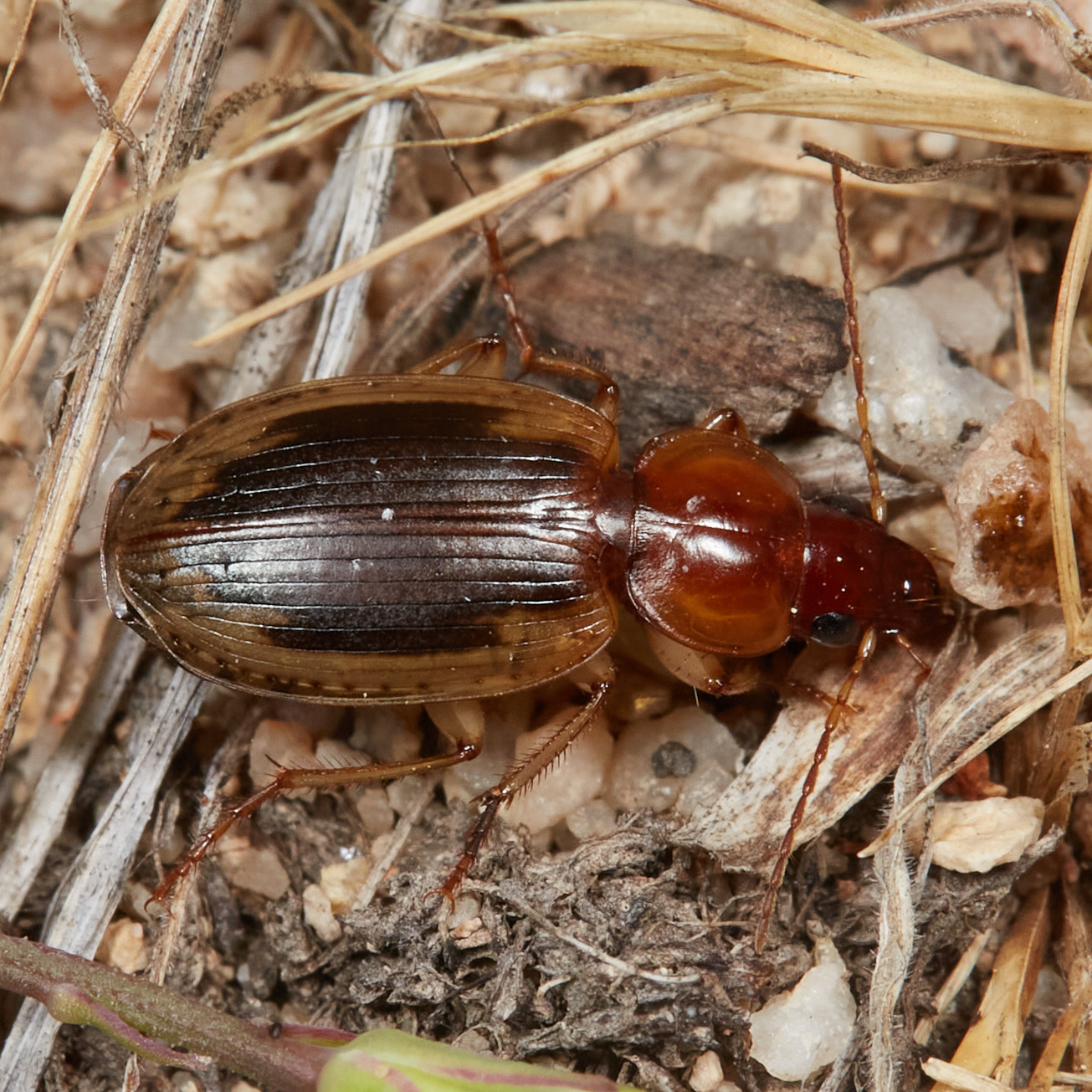
- Tanystoma maculicolle, California

Scientific classification
- Kingdom: Animalia
- Phylum: Arthropoda
- Class: Insecta
- Order: Coleoptera
- Suborder: Adephaga
- Family: Carabidae
- Tribe: Platynini
- Genus: Tanystoma; Motschulsky, 1845

= Tanystoma =

Genus of beetles

Tanystoma is a genus of beetles in the family Carabidae. They are native to the Pacific Coast of North America from Oregon to Baja California.

Species include:

== Species ==
These five species belong to the genus Tanystoma:

- Tanystoma cuyama Liebherr, 1985
- Tanystoma diabolicum Liebherr, 1989
- Tanystoma maculicolle (Dejean, 1828) (tule beetle)
- Tanystoma striatum (Dejean, 1828)
- Tanystoma sulcatum (Dejean, 1828)
