= Tanystoma striatum =

Scientific classification
- Kingdom: Animalia
- Phylum: Arthropoda
- Class: Insecta
- Order: Coleoptera
- Suborder: Adephaga
- Family: Carabidae
- Genus: Tanystoma
- Species: T. striatum

Binomial name
- Tanystoma striatum (Dejean, 1828)

Species of beetle

Tanystoma striatum is a species of ground beetle in the family Carabidae. It is found in North America.
