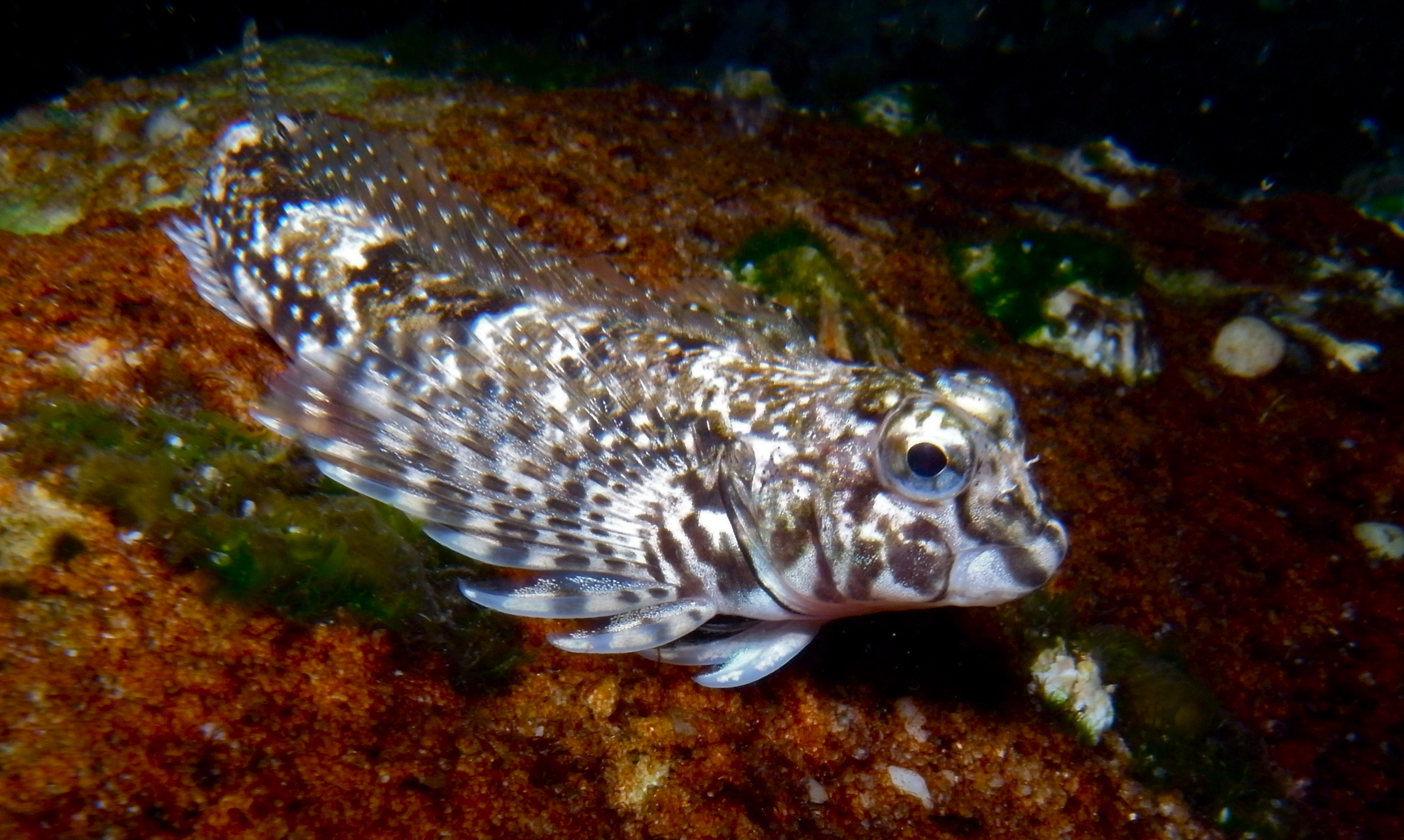

Conservation status
- Least Concern (IUCN 3.1)

Scientific classification
- Kingdom: Animalia
- Phylum: Chordata
- Class: Actinopterygii
- Order: Blenniiformes
- Family: Tripterygiidae
- Genus: Lepidoblennius
- Species: L. haplodactylus

Binomial name
- Lepidoblennius haplodactylus Steindachner, 1867

= Eastern jumping blenny =

Species of fish

The eastern jumping blenny (Lepidoblennius haplodactylus) is a species of triplefin blenny in the genus Lepidoblennius. It was described by Franz Steindachner in 1867 and is the type species of the genus Lepidoblennius.

== Description ==
The eastern jumping blenny has a body which is slightly compressed and a head which has no scales and has a steep upper jaw. It is greyish to greenish yellow on its upperparts, becoming paler towards the belly. There are normally five dark saddle-like markings along its back while the flanks are marked with small irregular pearly spots and dark blotches or vertical streaks. There is a brown band which runs from the eye to the upper jaw. The maximum recorded standard length is 10.7 centimetres (4.2 in). It can be identified from the allopatric western jumping blenny by having a broad membrane separating the third and fourth spine in the dorsal fin.

== Distribution ==
The eastern jumping blenny is endemic to the eastern coast of Australia. It is found from Rockhampton, Queensland to Western Port, Victoria.

== Habitat and biology ==
The eastern jumping blenny is found on shallow reefs where there are exposed rocks covered in algae, it is common in the intertidal zone and it is frequently observed at low tide on the water's edge when it can be seen to hop over damp, rocky surfaces. It is found at depths of 0 to 3 metres (0.0 to 9.8 ft).

== Etymology and taxonomy ==
The genus name Lepidoblennius means "scaled blenny" while the specific name is a compound of haplo meaning "single" and dactylus meaning "finger", a reference to the unbranched spines and rays of its pectoral, anal and caudal fins. It was described by the Austrian ichthyologist Franz Steindachner in 1867 and the type locality is the Fitzroy River at Rockhampton Queensland. It is the type species of its genus.
