= Othelais =

Scientific classification
- Kingdom: Animalia
- Phylum: Arthropoda
- Class: Insecta
- Order: Coleoptera
- Suborder: Polyphaga
- Infraorder: Cucujiformia
- Family: Cerambycidae
- Tribe: Acanthocinini
- Genus: Othelais

Genus of beetles

Othelais is a genus of beetles in the family Cerambycidae, containing the following species:

- Othelais affinis Breuning, 1939
- Othelais flavovariegata Breuning, 1939
- Othelais histrio (Pascoe, 1859)
- Othelais irrorata (MacLeay, 1885)
- Othelais subtessalata Breuning, 1960
- Othelais tesselata (Pascoe, 1866)
- Othelais transversefasciata Breuning, 1953
