= Carenum rutilans =

Scientific classification
- Kingdom: Animalia
- Phylum: Arthropoda
- Class: Insecta
- Order: Coleoptera
- Suborder: Adephaga
- Family: Carabidae
- Genus: Carenum
- Species: C. rutilans

Binomial name
- Carenum rutilans Sloane, 1907

Species of beetle

Carenum rutilans is a species of ground beetle found commonly in Australia in the subfamily Scaritinae. It was described by Sloane in 1907.
