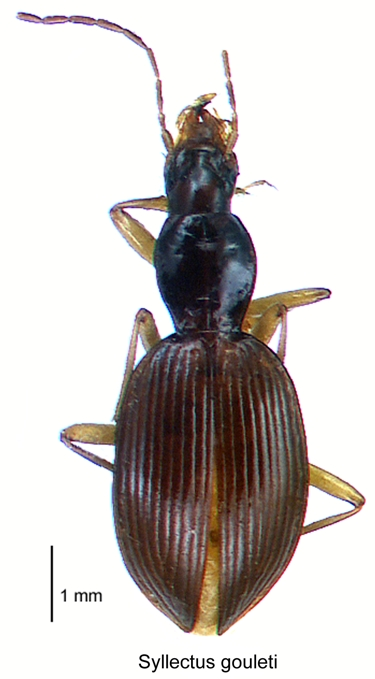

Scientific classification
- Domain: Eukaryota
- Kingdom: Animalia
- Phylum: Arthropoda
- Class: Insecta
- Order: Coleoptera
- Suborder: Adephaga
- Family: Carabidae
- Subfamily: Harpalinae
- Tribe: Pelmatellini
- Genus: Syllectus; Bates, 1878

= Syllectus =

Genus of beetles

Syllectus is a genus of beetles in the family Carabidae, endemic to New Zealand.

== Species ==
- Syllectus anomalus Bates, 1878
- Syllectus gouleti Larochelle & Lariviere, 2005
- Syllectus magnus Britton, 1964
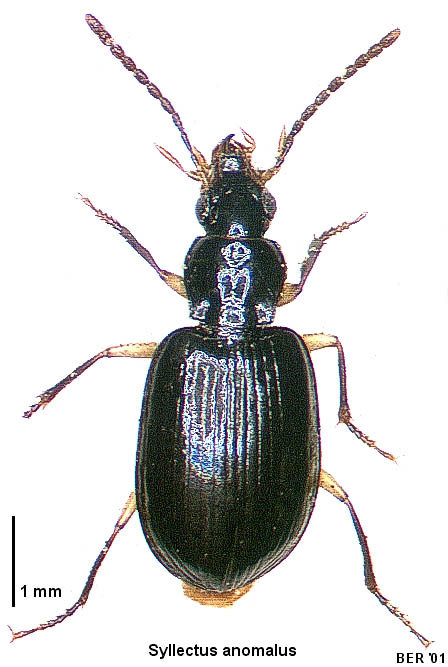
Syllectus anomalus

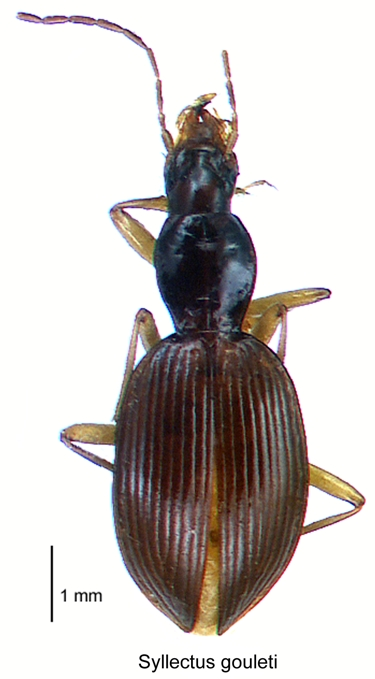
Syllectus gouleti

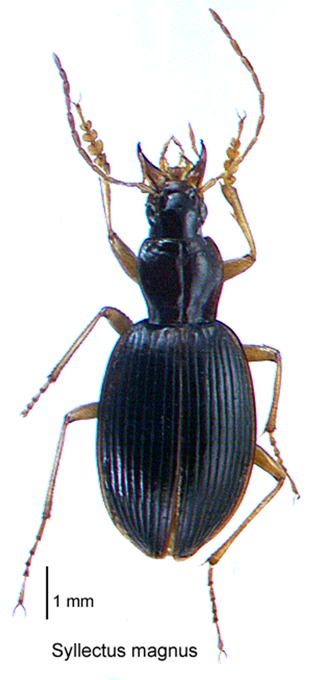
Syllectus magnus
