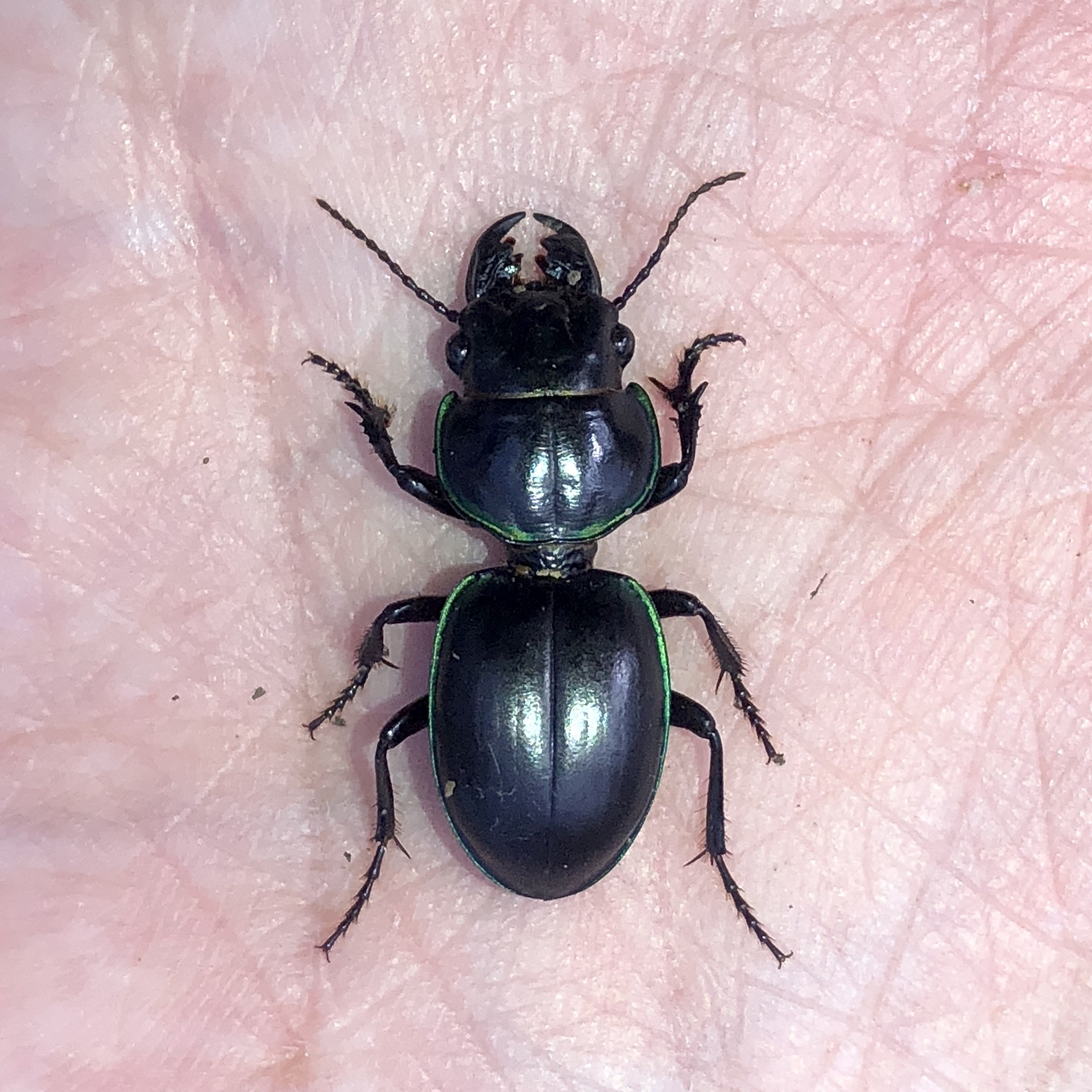

Scientific classification
- Kingdom: Animalia
- Phylum: Arthropoda
- Class: Insecta
- Order: Coleoptera
- Suborder: Adephaga
- Family: Carabidae
- Genus: Carenum
- Species: C. marginatum

Binomial name
- Carenum marginatum (Boisduval, 1835)

= Carenum marginatum =

Species of beetle

Carenum marginatum is a species of ground beetle in the subfamily Scaritinae. It was described by Jean Baptiste Boisduval in 1835.
