= Othelais transversefasciata =

Scientific classification
- Kingdom: Animalia
- Phylum: Arthropoda
- Class: Insecta
- Order: Coleoptera
- Suborder: Polyphaga
- Infraorder: Cucujiformia
- Family: Cerambycidae
- Genus: Othelais
- Species: O. transversefasciata

Binomial name
- Othelais transversefasciata Breuning, 1953

Species of beetle

Othelais transversefasciata is a species of beetle in the family Cerambycidae. It was described by Breuning in 1953.
