= Carenum convexum =

Scientific classification
- Kingdom: Animalia
- Phylum: Arthropoda
- Class: Insecta
- Order: Coleoptera
- Suborder: Adephaga
- Family: Carabidae
- Genus: Carenum
- Species: C. convexum

Binomial name
- Carenum convexum Chaudoir, 1868

Species of beetle

Carenum convexum is a species of ground beetle in the subfamily Scaritinae. It was described by Maximilien Chaudoir in 1868.
