= Carenum lobatum =

Scientific classification
- Kingdom: Animalia
- Phylum: Arthropoda
- Class: Insecta
- Order: Coleoptera
- Suborder: Adephaga
- Family: Carabidae
- Genus: Carenum
- Species: C. lobatum

Binomial name
- Carenum lobatum Sloane, 1900

Species of beetle

Carenum lobatum is a species of ground beetle in the subfamily Scaritinae. It was described by Sloane in 1900.
