= Carenum gratiosum =

Scientific classification
- Kingdom: Animalia
- Phylum: Arthropoda
- Class: Insecta
- Order: Coleoptera
- Suborder: Adephaga
- Family: Carabidae
- Genus: Carenum
- Species: C. gratiosum

Binomial name
- Carenum gratiosum (Sloane, 1897)

Species of beetle

Carenum gratiosum is a species of ground beetle in the subfamily Scaritinae. It was described by Sloane in 1897.
