= George Masters (zoologist) =

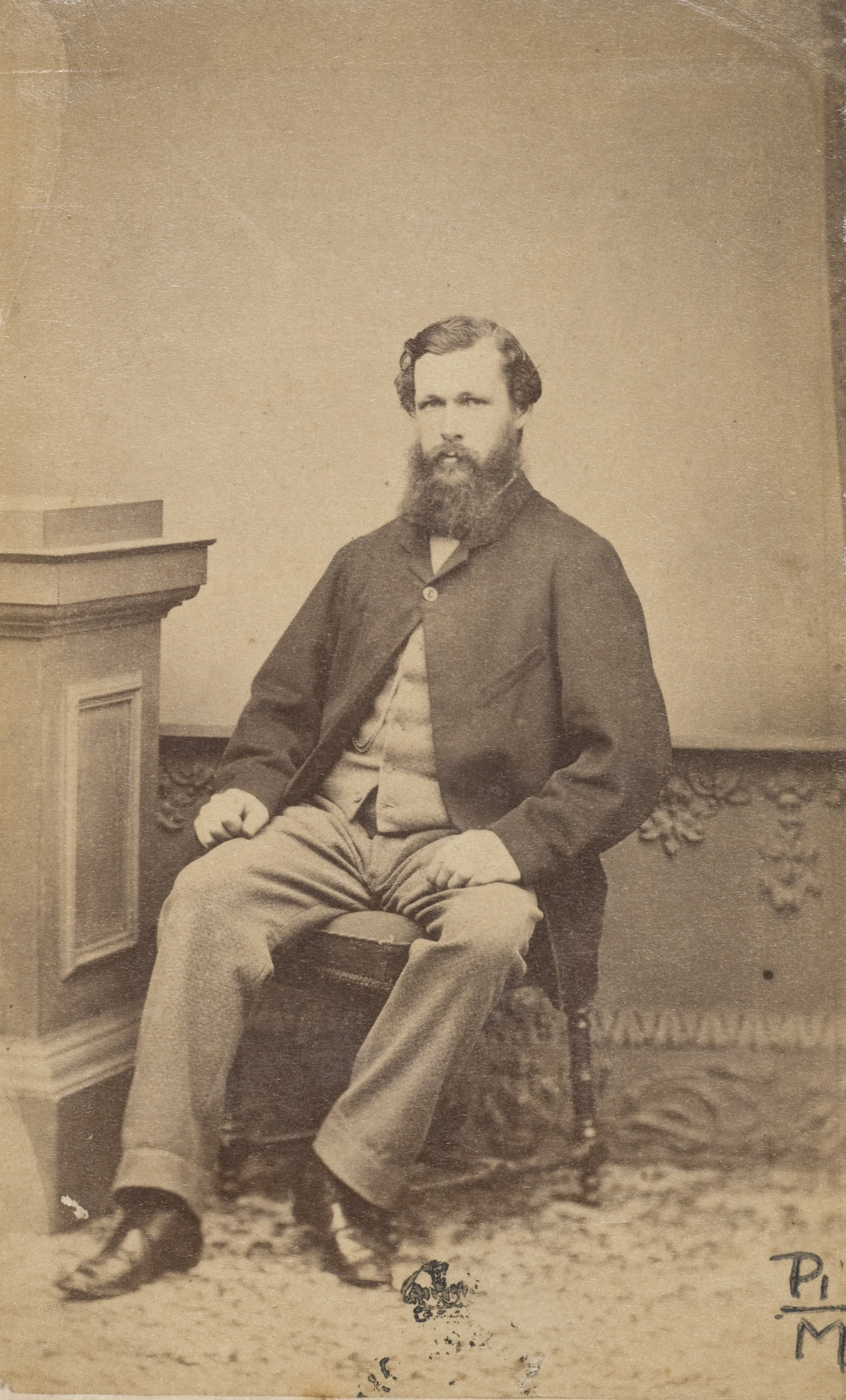
- Studio portrait of entomologist George Masters, 1867–1877
- Born: 1837; Maidstone, England
- Died: 1912 (aged 74–75)
- Citizenship: United Kingdom of Great Britain and Ireland
- Known for: zoology, entomology.
- Scientific career
- Fields: Zoology;
- Workplaces: Australian Museum, Macleay Museum

George Masters (1837–1912) was a zoologist, active in Australia during the 19th century.

== Biography ==
Born in Maidstone, England, to Matilda, née Terry, he was trained as a gardener by his father, George Masters, before moving to Sydney. Masters began working as a gardener, then collecting insects in Queensland for William John Macleay, with the backing of the zoologist Gerard Krefft, later taking a position with the Australian Museum as an assistant curator.

== Works ==
George Masters was a zoölogical collector, primarily of birds, but also of snakes and other animals. Masters also made a significant contribution to entomology, making large collections of insects available for research. He journeyed to remote regions to obtain specimens, including some that will difficult to obtain and are now listed as rare or endangered. His expeditions across the eastern states were extended to South and Western Australia, Tasmania, and Lord Howe Island. Noted collections include a series of specimens of the Queensland lungfish Neoceratodus forsteri, and in Western Australia, Dasyornis longirostris (western bristlebird) and Atrichornis clamosus (noisy scrub bird).

Masters made two collections from Australia's south west for the museum in Sydney, noted as exceptional in a period when the study the birds of the region was lacking. He arrived by ship at King George Sound in 1866 for his first expedition, collecting a single specimen of the cryptic noisy scrub bird and two of the western bristlebird in a total of 281 bird skins. His second expedition (1868–69) was longer and further, journeying from Albany as far as the head of the Pallinup River, returning to Sydney with six more Atrichornis clamosus skins, 10 of Dasyornis longirostris, and eight of Psophodes nigrogularis (western whipbird). These collections also supplemented those of nests and eggs of that state at the Australian Museum, and allowed A. J. North to publish more complete records of its birds oology and nidification in 1889.

He continued collecting for himself, Krefft, Macleay, and others, despite an agreement with the museum to desist from doing so for personal gain.

Masters is said to have gained extensive knowledge of Australian fauna, but avoided recording this in writing. However, Masters observations of Atrichornis clamosus were published and are important records of a rare and little-known bird. His collections are often cited in North's Nests and eggs of birds found breeding in Australia (publ. 1901–14). He served as curator at the Macleay Museum until 1912.

== Legacy ==
Masters is commemorated in the scientific name of a species of an Australian venomous snake, Drysdalia mastersii; as well as an Australian species of bess beetle, Aulacocyclus mastersii.
