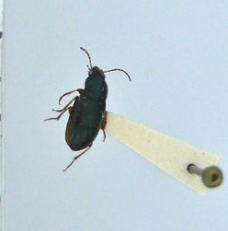
- Pelmatellus obtusa

Scientific classification
- Domain: Eukaryota
- Kingdom: Animalia
- Phylum: Arthropoda
- Class: Insecta
- Order: Coleoptera
- Suborder: Adephaga
- Family: Carabidae
- Subfamily: Harpalinae
- Genus: Pelmatellus; Bates, 1882

= Pelmatellus =

Genus of beetles

Pelmatellus is a genus of ground beetles in the family Carabidae. There are at least 20 described species in Pelmatellus.

== Species ==
These 27 species belong to the genus Pelmatellus:

- Pelmatellus amicorum Delgado & Ruiz-Tapiador, 2020
- Pelmatellus andium Bates, 1891
- Pelmatellus balli Goulet, 1974
- Pelmatellus brachyptera Goulet, 1974
- Pelmatellus caerulescens Moret, 2005
- Pelmatellus columbiana (Reiche, 1843)
- Pelmatellus cuencana Moret, 2001
- Pelmatellus cyanescens Bates, 1882
- Pelmatellus cycnus Moret, 2001
- Pelmatellus espeletiarum Moret, 2001
- Pelmatellus gracilis Moret, 2001
- Pelmatellus inca Moret, 2001
- Pelmatellus infuscata Goulet, 1974
- Pelmatellus laticlavia Moret, 2001
- Pelmatellus leucopus (Bates, 1882)
- Pelmatellus lojana Moret, 2001
- Pelmatellus martinezi Moret, 2001
- Pelmatellus nigrita (Motschulsky, 1866)
- Pelmatellus nitescens Bates, 1882
- Pelmatellus nubicola Goulet, 1974
- Pelmatellus obesa Moret, 2001
- Pelmatellus obtusa Bates, 1882
- Pelmatellus polylepis Moret, 2001
- Pelmatellus rotundicollis Goulet, 1974
- Pelmatellus stenolophoides Bates, 1882
- Pelmatellus variipes Bates, 1891
- Pelmatellus vexator Bates, 1882
