= Félix Jean Marie Louis Ancey =

French entomologist and malacologist

Félix Jean Marie Louis Ancey (2 August 1835, in Marseille – 1 June 1919, in Le Beausset) was a French entomologist and malacologist.

Félix Ancey who lived in Algeria worked mainly on Coleoptera and Hymenoptera. His son César Marie Félix Ancey was also an entomologist and malacologist.

== Works ==
Partial list

- Description d'une nouvelle espèce du genre Ceratorhina. Naturaliste 2: 317 (1880)
- Descriptions de Coléoptères nouveaux. Naturaliste 2: 509 (1881)
- Contributions à la faune de l'Afrique orientale. Descriptions de Coléoptères nouveaux. 2e partie. Naturalista siciliano 2(3): 68-72.
- Contributions à la Faune de l'Afrique Orientale. Descriptions de Coléoptères nouveaux. Il Naturalista Siciliano 2:116-120.
- Contributions à la faune de l'Afrique orientale. Descriptions de Coléoptères nouveaux. Naturalista siciliano (1883)
- Contributions à la faune de l'Afrique orientale. Descriptions de Coléoptères nouveaux. Naturalista siciliano (1883)
- Contributions à la faune de l'Afrique orientale. Naturalista siciliano 8: 224.(1886)
