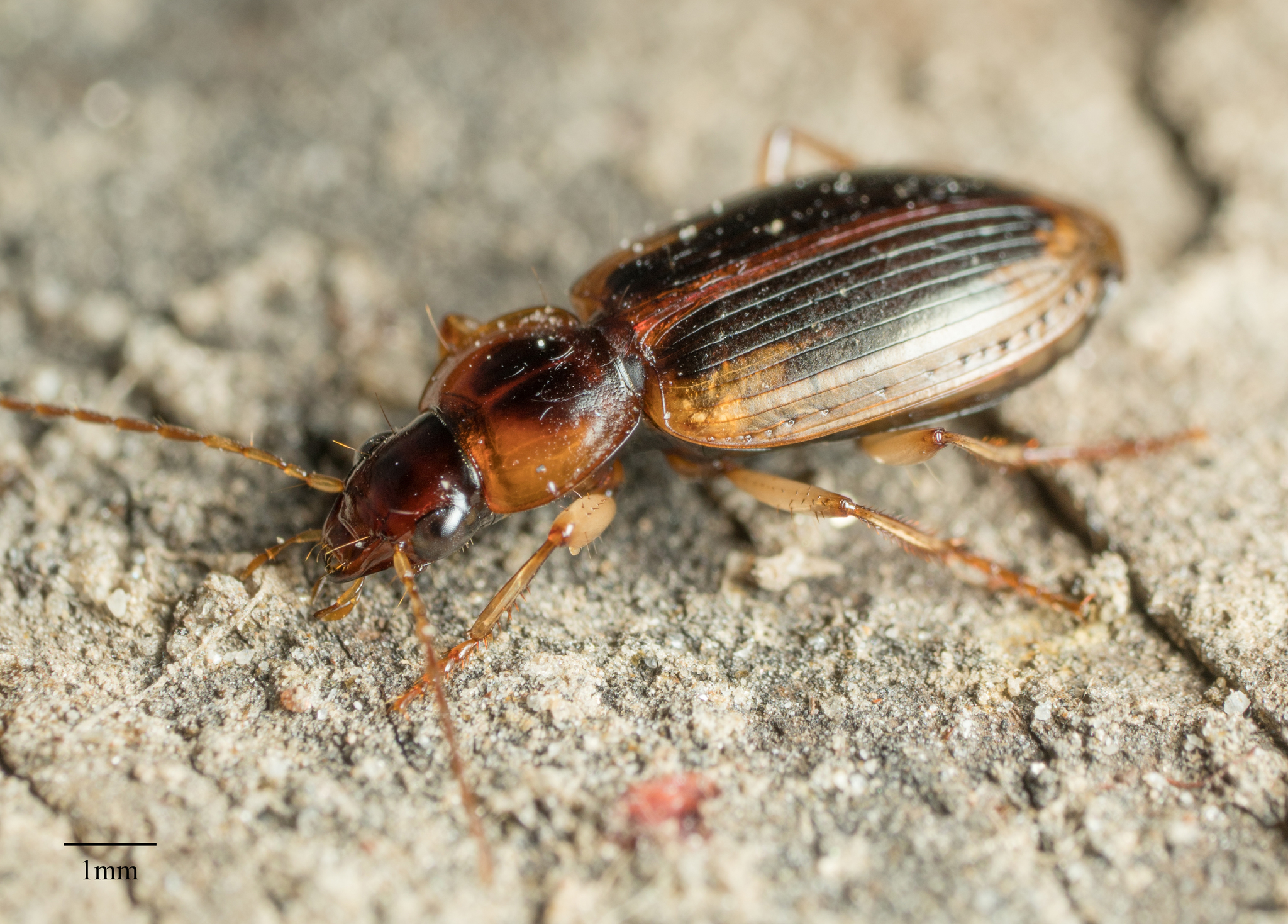

Scientific classification
- Kingdom: Animalia
- Phylum: Arthropoda
- Class: Insecta
- Order: Coleoptera
- Suborder: Adephaga
- Family: Carabidae
- Genus: Tanystoma
- Species: T. maculicolle

Binomial name
- Tanystoma maculicolle Dejean, 1828

Synonyms
- Agonum maculicolle Dejean, 1828; Agonum angustior Casey 1920; Agonum guadelupense Casey, 1920

= Tanystoma maculicolle =

Species of beetle

Tanystoma maculicolle is a species of beetle in the family Carabidae. It is found in southern Oregon and much of California, where it has been described as "extremely common". Its common names include tule beetle, overflow bug, and grease bug. It is especially familiar in the agricultural areas of the Central Valley of California, where it sometimes invades homes.
