= William John Macleay =

British naturalist

Sir William John Macleay MLC
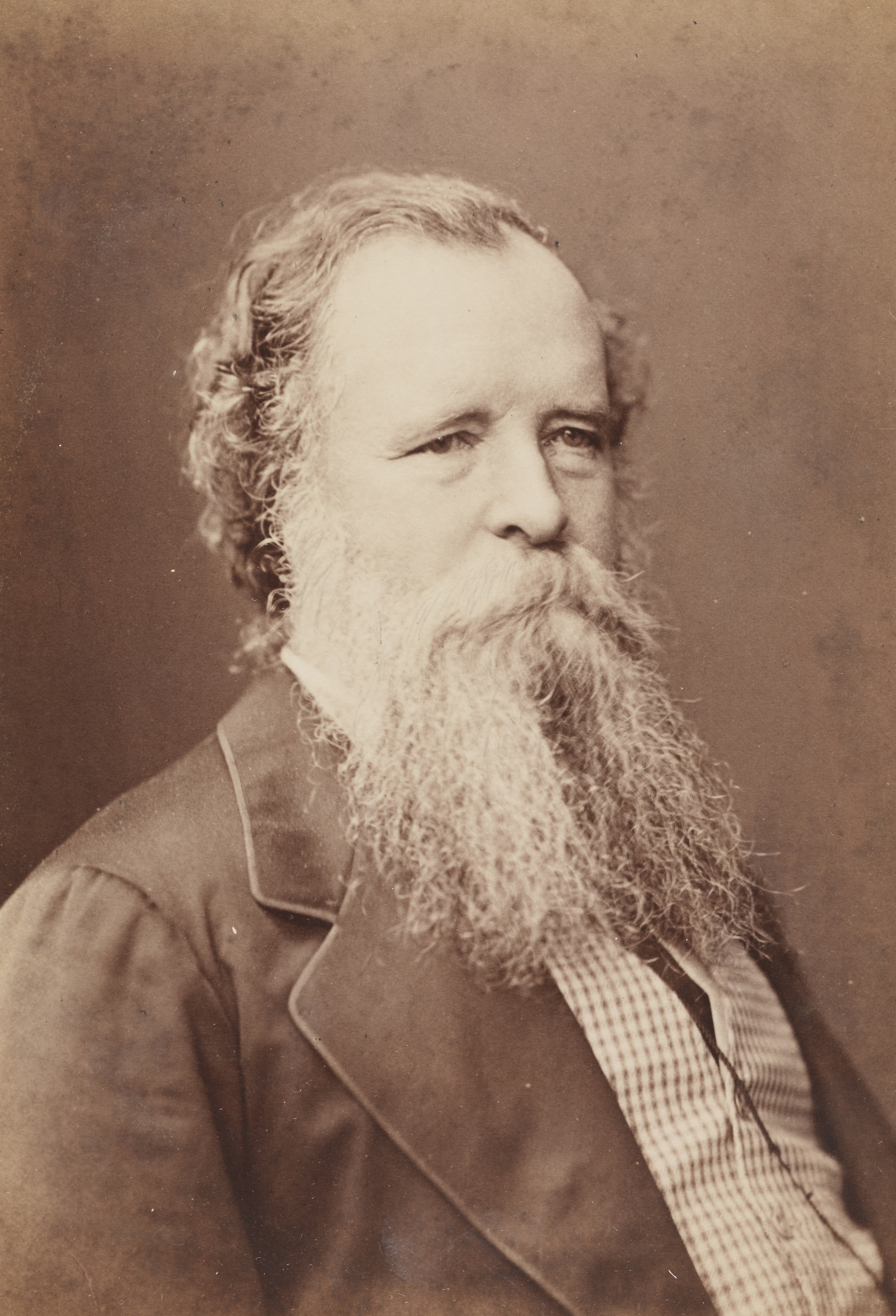
- Portrait by J. Hubert, c. 1890
- Born: 13 June 1820; Wick, Scotland
- Died: 7 December 1891 (aged 71); Sydney, Australia
- Known for: Politician, naturalist

Sir William John Macleay MLC (13 June 1820 – 7 December 1891) was a Scottish-Australian politician, naturalist, zoologist, and herpetologist.

== Early life ==
Macleay was born at Wick, Caithness, Scotland, second son of Kenneth Macleay of Keiss and his wife Barbara, née Horne. Macleay was educated at the Edinburgh Academy 1834–1836 and then to studied medicine at the University of Edinburgh. After his mother died, he moved to Australia with his cousin, William Sharp Macleay. The two first settled by Goulburn and then near the Murrumbidgee River.

He is noted as the last of the naturalists in a family active in this field; his uncle was Alexander Macleay, Colonial Secretary of New South Wales from 1826 to 1836, and a member and fellow of societies concerned with the flora and fauna of the empire's colonies.

== Political career ==
On 1 March 1855 Macleay was elected to the old Legislative Council as member for the Lachlan and Lower Darling Pastoral District. After responsible government, on 19 April 1856 Macleay was elected to the Legislative Assembly for the Lachlan and Lower Darling serving until 11 April 1859. From 1860 to 1874 he represented Murrumbidgee in the Assembly.

== Confrontation with Ben Hall's gang ==
The gang of bushrangers led by Ben Hall were active on the road between Sydney and Goulburn, during mid-December 1864. On 19 December 1864, Macleay was travelling along the road in his buggy. Aware of the presence of bushrangers in the area, he was carrying a Tranter revolving rifle, a formidable weapon for its day. He came across a bail up in progress, and approached the less well-armed gang, who fled. When Macleay reached Plumb's inn (now a private residence on the right (eastern) bank of Narambulla Creek, 9.5 km south of Marulan), the gang returned and attacked. Macleay reached the verandah of the inn and he returned fire, until the gang left the scene. He was awarded a medal for his bravery.

== See also ==
- Category:Taxa named by William John Macleay

New South Wales Legislative Council
Preceded by William Macarthur	Member for the Pastoral Districts of Lachlan and Lower Darling; Mar 1855 – Feb 1856	Council abolished
New South Wales Legislative Assembly
New parliament	Member for Lachlan and Lower Darling; 1856 – 1859; Served alongside: Garland/Paterson	district abolished
Preceded by John Hay; George Macleay	Member for Murrumbidgee; 1860 – 1874	Succeeded by William Forster
