= October 1856 Sydney Hamlets colonial by-election =

By-election in New South Wales, Australia

A by-election was held for the New South Wales Legislative Assembly electorate of Sydney Hamlets on 10 October 1856 because Stuart Donaldson was appointed Colonial Treasurer in the Parker ministry. Under the constitution, ministers were required to resign to recontest their seats in a by-election when appointed. Of the other ministers, Henry Parker narrowly won the by election for Parramatta. John Darvall comfortably won the by-election for Cumberland North Riding, and William Manning comfortably won the by-election for Cumberland South Riding. Only John Hay (Murrumbidgee) was re-elected unopposed.

== Dates ==
Date	Event
6 June 1856	Stuart Donaldson appointed Colonial Treasurer.
3 October 1856	Writ of election issued by the Speaker of the Legislative Assembly.
13 October 1856	Nominations
16 October 1856	Polling day
20 October 1856	Return of writ

== Result ==
October 1856 Sydney Hamlets by-election 10 October
Candidate	Votes	%
John Campbell (elected)	870	55.7
Stuart Donaldson (defeated)	691	44.3
Total formal votes	1,561	100.0
Informal votes	0	0.0
Turnout	1,561	51.6

== Aftermath ==
Stuart Donaldson re-gained a seat in the parliament at the November 1856 by-election for Cumberland South Riding,

== See also ==
- Electoral results for the district of Sydney Hamlets
- List of New South Wales state by-elections
