= 1858 Cumberland (North Riding) colonial by-election =

By-election in New South Wales, Australia

A by-election was held for the New South Wales Legislative Assembly electorate of Cumberland North Riding in September 1858 because of the resignation of Henry Parkes due to financial difficulties with his newspaper The Empire.

== Dates ==
Date	Event
28 August 1858	Henry Parkes resigned.
31 August 1858	Writ of election issued by the Speaker of the Legislative Assembly.
13 September 1858	Nominations
20 September 1858	Polling day
24 September 1858	Return of writ

== Result ==
1858 Cumberland (North Riding) by-election Monday 13 September
Candidate	Votes	%
John Plunkett (elected)	unopposed	

== See also ==
- Electoral results for the district of Cumberland (North Riding)
- List of New South Wales state by-elections
