= Electoral results for the district of Cumberland (North Riding) =

Election results for Cumberland North Riding, New South Wales, Australia

Cumberland North Riding, an electoral district of the Legislative Assembly in the Australian state of New South Wales was created in 1856 and abolished in 1859.

Election	Member	Party	Member	Party
1856	John Darvall	None	James Pye	None
June 1856 by	John Darvall	None	James Pye	None
October 1856 by	John Darvall	None	James Pye	None
1857 by	Thomas Smith	None	James Pye	None
1858	Thomas Smith	None	Henry Parkes	None
1858 by	Thomas Smith	None	John Plunkett	None

== Election results ==
=== 1858 by-election ===
1858 Cumberland (North Riding) by-election Monday 13 September
Candidate	Votes	%
John Plunkett (elected)	unopposed	

The by-election was caused by the resignation of Henry Parkes due to financial difficulties with his newspaper The Empire.

=== 1858 ===
1858 New South Wales colonial election: Cumberland (North Riding) 28 January
Candidate	Votes	%
Thomas Smith (re-elected 1)	716	36.6
Henry Parkes (elected 2)	633	32.4
Richard Hill	606	31.0
Total formal votes	1,955	100.0
Informal votes	0	0
Turnout	1,955	43.8

The sitting member James Pye unsuccessfully contested Parramatta.

=== 1857 by-election ===
1857 Cumberland (North Riding) by-election Friday 11 December
Candidate	Votes	%
Thomas Smith (elected)	394	57.4
Henry Parkes	292	42.6
Total formal votes	686	100.0
Informal votes	0	0
Turnout	686	30.8

The by-election was caused by the resignation of John Darvall in November 1857.

=== October 1856 by-election ===
1856 Cumberland (North Riding) by-election Thursday 16 October
Candidate	Votes	%
John Darvall (elected)	560	68.0
James Byrnes	264	32.0
Total formal votes	824	100.0
Informal votes	0	0
Turnout	824	42.9

The by-election was caused by the appointment of John Darvall as Solicitor General in the Parker ministry.

=== June 1856 by-election ===
1856 Cumberland (North Riding) by-election Thursday 19 June
Candidate	Votes	%
John Darvall (elected)	483	68.8
Patrick Hogan	219	31.2
Total formal votes	702	100.0
Informal votes	0	0.0
Turnout	702	36.6

The by-election was caused by the appointment of John Darvall as Solicitor General in the Donaldson ministry.

=== 1856 ===
1856 New South Wales colonial election: Cumberland (North Riding)
Candidate	Votes	%
John Darvall (elected 1)	442	28.7
James Pye (elected 2)	401	26.1
William Sherwin	376	24.4
Patrick Hogan	319	20.7
Robert Fitzgerald	1	0.06
Total formal votes	1,539	100.0
Informal votes	0	0.0
Turnout	849	45.7

Polling was conducted on 4 April 1856. Both Darvall and Fitzgerald represented the County of Cumberland in the old Legislative Council.
