= Parker ministry =

New South Wales government ministry led by Henry Parker

- 3rd Cabinet of the Colony of New South Wales

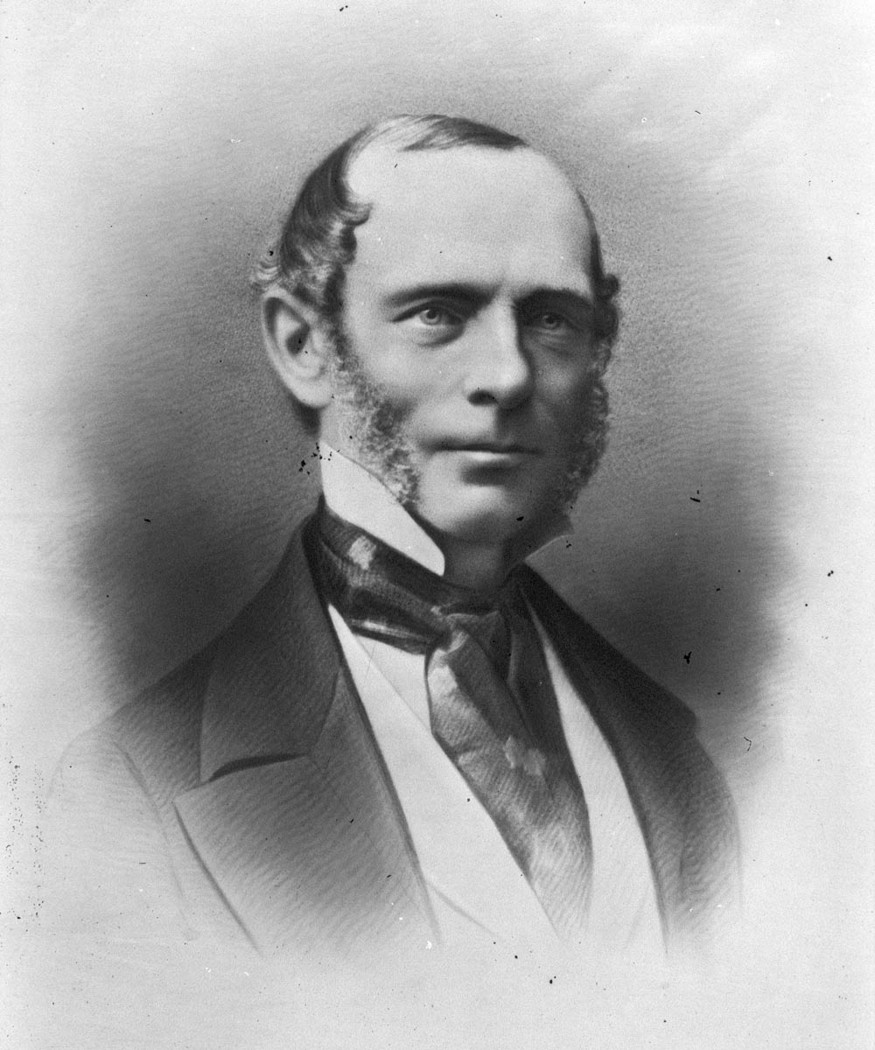
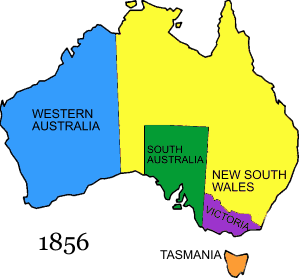
- Premier Henry Parker and the Colony of New South Wales (1856–1859)
- Date formed: 3 October 1856
- Date dissolved: 7 September 1857

People and organisations
- Monarch: Queen Victoria
- Governor: William Denison
- Head of government: Henry Parker
- No. of ministers: 6
- Member party: unaligned
- Status in legislature: Minority government
- Opposition party: unaligned
- Opposition leader: Charles Cowper

History
- Predecessor: First Cowper ministry
- Successor: Second Cowper ministry

The Parker ministry was the third ministry of the Colony of New South Wales, and was led by Henry Parker. Parker was elected in the first free elections for the New South Wales Legislative Assembly held in March 1856 and, following the failure of the Donaldson and Cowper Governments to maintain the confidence of the Assembly, was asked to form Government.

The title of Premier was widely used to refer to the Leader of Government, but not enshrined in formal use until 1920.

There was no party system in New South Wales politics until 1887. Under the constitution, ministers were required to resign to recontest their seats in a by-election when appointed. Henry Parker narrowly won the by election for Parramatta. John Darvall comfortably won the by-election for Cumberland North Riding, and William Manning comfortably won the by-election for Cumberland South Riding, Stuart Donaldson was defeated at the by election for Sydney Hamlets, however he re-gained a seat in the parliament at the November by-election for Cumberland South Riding, Only John Hay (Murrumbidgee) was re-elected unopposed.

This ministry covers the period from 3 October 1856 until on 7 September 1857, when Parker resigned his commission, having lost an electoral bill. During this period, there was a slight re-arrangement to the ministry, following the resignation of William Manning on account of ill-health, with John Darvall promoted to Attorney-General and Edward Wise being appointed to the junior role of Solicitor-General.

== Composition of ministry ==
| Portfolio | Minister | Term start | Term end | Term length |
|---|---|---|---|---|
| Premier; Colonial Secretary | Henry Parker | 3 October 1856 | 7 September 1857 | 339 days |
| Colonial Treasurer | Stuart Donaldson | 3 October 1856 | 7 September 1857 | 339 days |
| Secretary for Lands and Works | John Hay | 3 October 1856 | 7 September 1857 | 339 days |
| Attorney-General | William Manning | 3 October 1856 | 25 May 1857 | 234 days |
| Attorney-General | John Darvall | 26 May 1857 | 7 September 1857 | 339 days |
| Solicitor-General | John Darvall | 3 October 1856 | 23 May 1857 | 339 days |
| Solicitor-General | Edward Wise | 23 May 1857 | 7 September 1857 | 107 days |
| Vice-President of the Executive Council; Representative of the Government in the Legislative Council | Edward Deas Thomson MLC (Note: The NSW Parliamentary Record lists Edward Deas Thomson as having been appointed on 26 May 1857, however the New South Wales Government Gazette notified his appointment at on 3 October with the rest of the ministers.) | 3 October 1856 | 7 September 1857 | 339 days |

Ministers are members of the Legislative Assembly unless otherwise noted.

== See also ==
- Self-government in New South Wales
- Members of the New South Wales Legislative Assembly, 1856–1858

== Notes ==
| Preceded by First Cowper ministry | Parker ministry 1856–1857 | Succeeded by Second Cowper ministry |
