= June 1856 Sydney Hamlets colonial by-election =

By-election in New South Wales, Australia

A by-election was held for the New South Wales Legislative Assembly electorate of Sydney Hamlets on 17 June 1856 because Stuart Donaldson was appointed Colonial Secretary forming the Donaldson ministry. Under the constitution, ministers were required to resign to recontest their seats in a by-election when appointed. Of the other ministers, John Darvall comfortably won the by-election for Cumberland North Riding. Thomas Holt (Stanley Boroughs) and Bob Nichols (Northumberland Boroughs) were re-elected unopposed. William Manning was not required to resign as he held the office of Solicitor-General at the time of his election.

== Dates ==
Date	Event
6 June 1856	Stuart Donaldson appointed Colonial Secretary.
7 June 1856	Writ of election issued by the Speaker of the Legislative Assembly.
16 June 1856	Nominations at Redfern.
17 June 1856	Polling day between the hours of 9 am and 4 pm.
19 June 1856	Return of writ

== Result ==
1856 Sydney Hamlets by-election Tuesday 17 June
Candidate	Votes	%
Stuart Donaldson (elected)	883	63.4
John Campbell	510	36.6
Total formal votes	1,393	100.0
Informal votes	0	0
Turnout	1,393	46.0

== See also ==
- Electoral results for the district of Sydney Hamlets
- List of New South Wales state by-elections
