= 1856 Cumberland (North Riding) colonial by-election =

1856 Cumberland (North Riding) colonial by-election may refer to

- June 1856 Cumberland (North Riding) colonial by-election
- October 1856 Cumberland (North Riding) colonial by-election

== See also ==
- List of New South Wales state by-elections
