= 1856 Sydney Hamlets colonial by-election =

1856 Sydney Hamlets colonial by-election may refer to

- 1856 Sydney Hamlets colonial by-election 1 held in June 1856
- 1856 Sydney Hamlets colonial by-election 2 held in October 1856

== See also ==
- List of New South Wales state by-elections
