= Donaldson ministry =

New South Wales government ministry led by Stuart Donaldson

- First ministry of the Colony of New South Wales
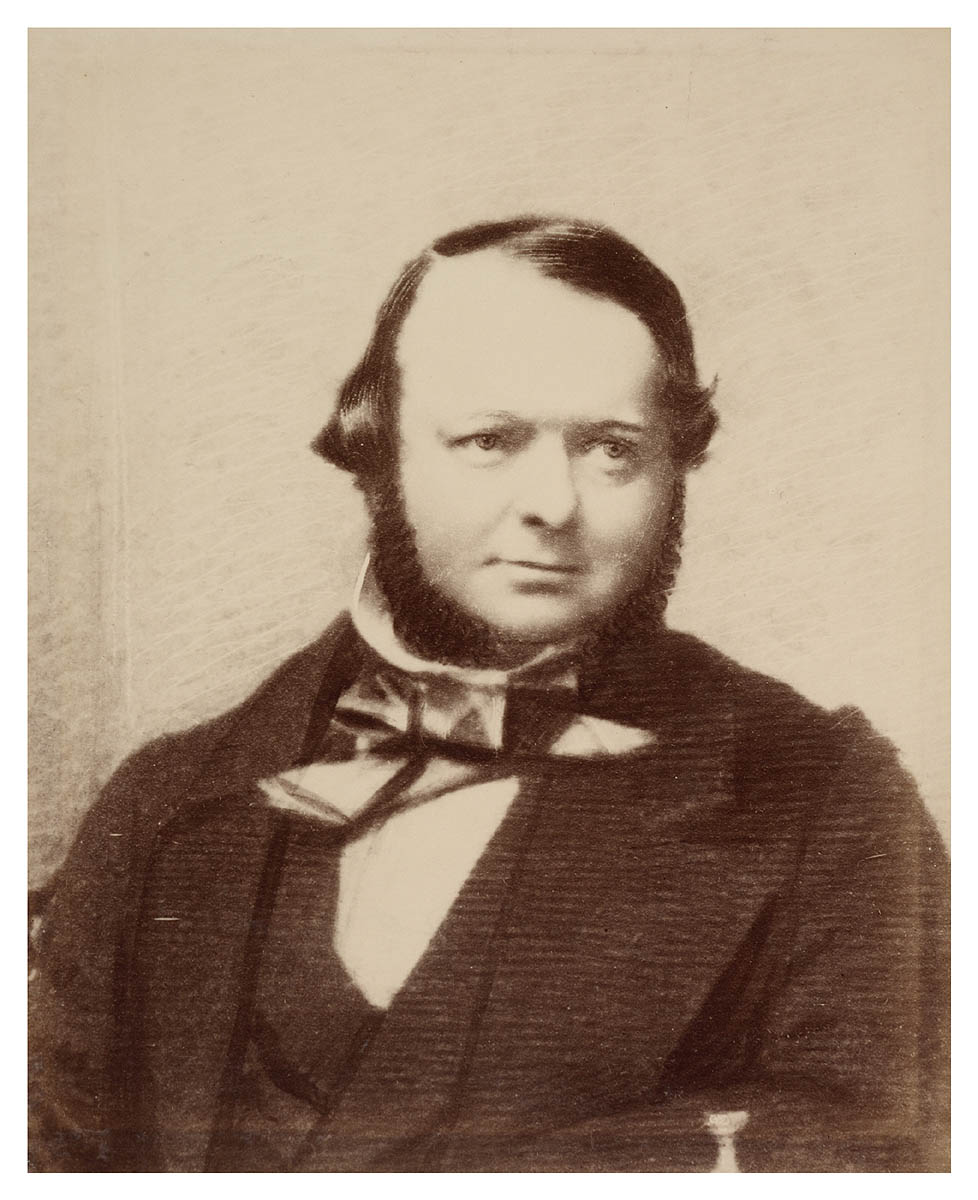
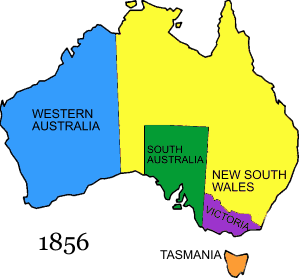
- Premier Stuart Donaldson and the Colony of New South Wales (1856–1859)
- Date formed: 6 June 1856
- Date dissolved: 25 August 1856

People and organisations
- Monarch: Queen Victoria
- Governor: William Denison
- Head of government: Stuart Donaldson
- No. of ministers: 6
- Member party: unaligned
- Status in legislature: Minority government
- Opposition party: unaligned
- Opposition leader: Charles Cowper

History
- Election: 1856
- Successor: First Cowper ministry

The Donaldson ministry was the first ministry of the Colony of New South Wales, and was led by Stuart Donaldson. Despite the first free elections for the New South Wales Legislative Assembly being held in March 1856, it took over two months for Donaldson to form Government. It was sworn in on 6 June 1856, after the 1856 election and lasted just eighty days.

The title of Premier was widely used to refer to the Leader of Government, but not enshrined in formal use until 1920.

There was no party system in New South Wales politics until 1887. Under the constitution, ministers were required to resign to recontest their seats in a by-election when appointed. Stuart Donaldson comfortably won the by election for Sydney Hamlets, and John Darvall comfortably won the by-election for Cumberland North Riding. Thomas Holt (Stanley Boroughs) and Bob Nichols (Northumberland Boroughs) were re-elected unopposed. William Manning was not required to resign as he held the office of Solicitor-General at the time of his election.

This ministry covers the period from 6 June 1856 until on 25 August 1856, when Donaldson resigned his commission, having lost the confidence of the Assembly.

== Composition of ministry ==
Portfolio	Minister	Term start	Term end	Term length
Premier; Colonial Secretary	Stuart Donaldson	6 June 1856	25 August 1856	80 days
Colonial Treasurer	Thomas Holt	6 June 1856	25 August 1856	80 days
Attorney General	William Manning	6 June 1856	25 August 1856	80 days
Solicitor General	John Darvall	6 June 1856	25 August 1856	80 days
Auditor-General; Secretary for Lands and Works	George Nichols	6 June 1856	25 August 1856	80 days
Representative of the Government in the Legislative Council (Note: A member of the government without a seat in the Cabinet.)	William Mayne MLC	6 August 1856	25 August 1856	19 days

Ministers are members of the Legislative Assembly unless otherwise noted.

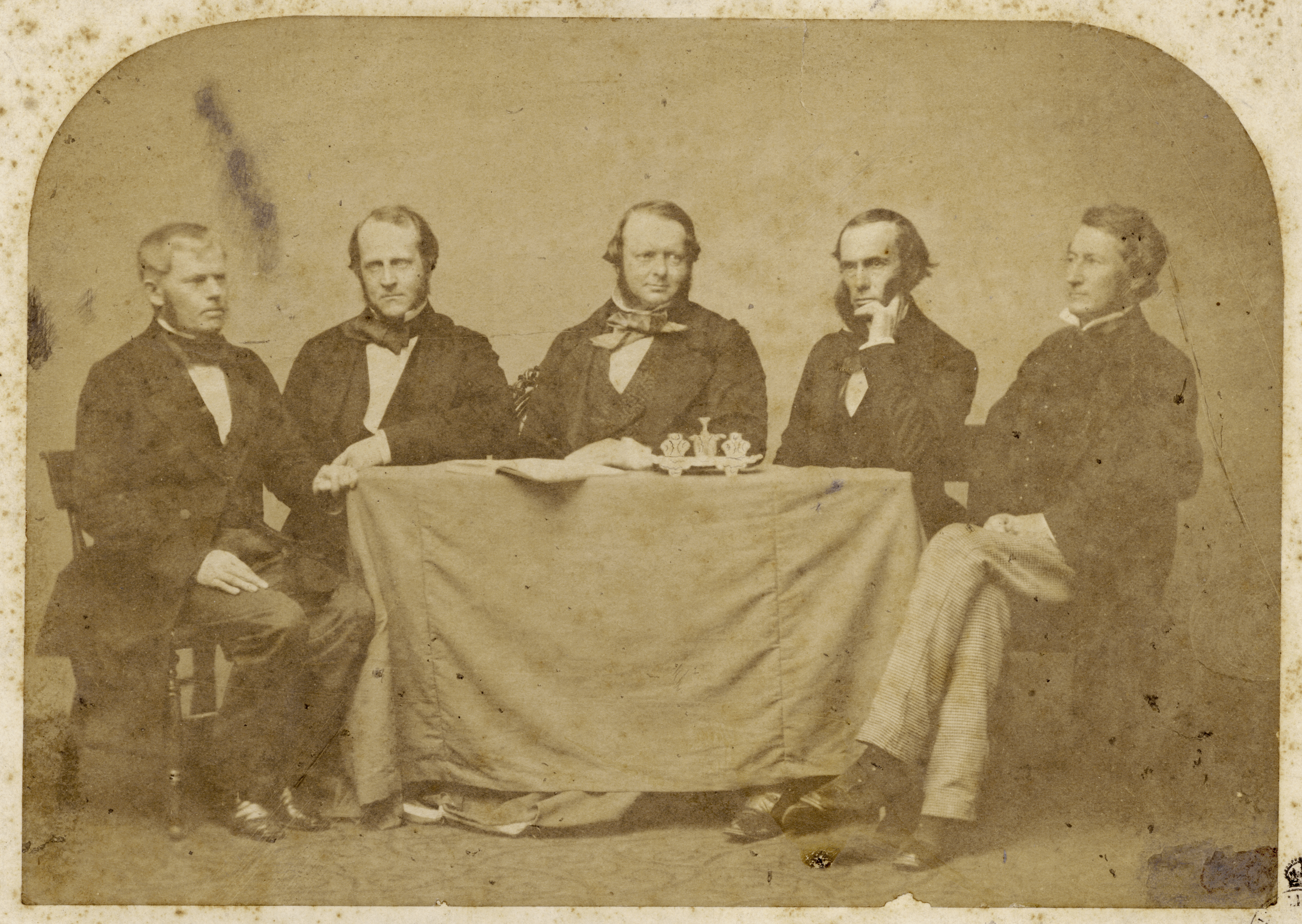

1	Thomas Holt (Treasurer)
2	William M. Manning (Attorney-General)
3	Stuart Donaldson (Premier)

4	John Darvall (Solicitor-General)
5	Bob Nichols (Auditor-General)

Executive Council of New South Wales, 1856, photographed by Freeman Brothers

== See also ==
- Self-government in New South Wales
- Members of the New South Wales Legislative Assembly, 1856–1858

First responsible government	Donaldson ministry 1856	Succeeded by First Cowper ministry
