= Lyttleton Bayley =

Australian politician

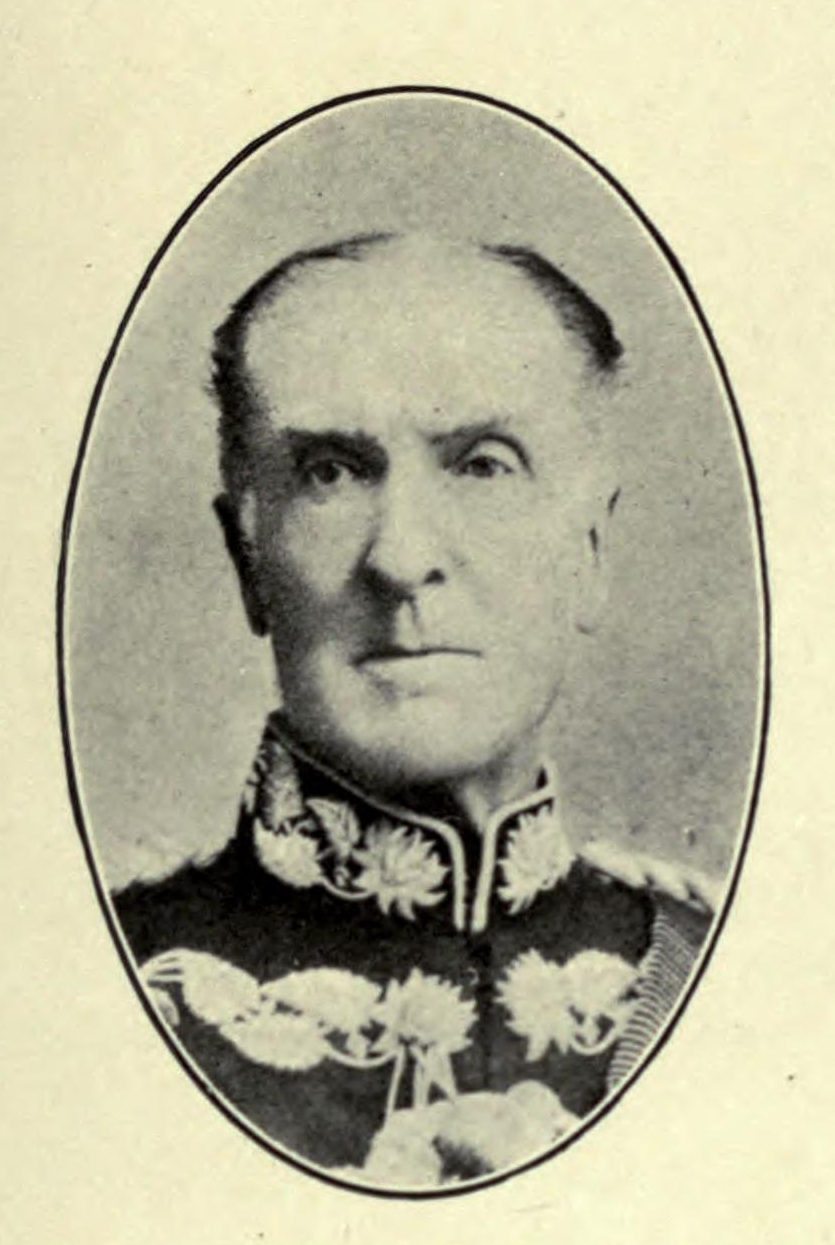

Sir Lyttleton Holyoake Bayley (6 May 1827 – 4 August 1910), was an English lawyer who served as Attorney-General of New South Wales, Acting Chief Justice at the Bombay High Court and Advocate-General of Bombay. He was also an amateur cricketer who played in 16 first-class cricket matches.

Bayley was the second son of Sir John Edward George Bayley, 2nd Baronet (1793–1871), and brother of Sir John Robert Laurie Emilius Bayley, 3rd Baronet. He was educated at Eton and Trinity College, Cambridge. Bayley captained the 1844 cricket team at Eton and played first-class cricket from 1846 to 1848. He played eight matches for Marylebone Cricket Club (MCC), of whom his father was president in 1844, and four times for Kent County Cricket Club and the Gentlemen of Kent.

Bayley was called to the bar at the Middle Temple in May 1850, and married, in May 1852, Isabella, daughter of Anthony Mactier, of Durris House, Kincardineshire, who died in April 1860. He emigrated to Australia, arriving in late 1858, and was appointed to the New South Wales Legislative Council on 19 Jan 1859 and Attorney-General Wales in the second Charles Cowper Government from 21 February 1859. His appointment gave great offence to the legal fraternity, as he had been but a short time in the colony; and Daniel Deniehy moved a resolution censuring his nomination. It was not, however, carried. Bayley resigned from the Legislative Council on 28 April 1859 to stand for the newly created electoral district of Mudgee in the Legislative Assembly, winning with 69% of the votes. He resigned from the Legislative Assembly on 26 November 1859, and moved to Melbourne before returning to England.

In 1866 Bayley was appointed Advocate-General at Bombay, India, and Puisne Judge in 1869. When Charles Farran, junior to him, was posted Chief Justice, he resigned in 1895. Bayley briefly acted as aide-de-camp to the Viceroy of India.

Bayley died on 4 August 1910 at Parkstone, Dorset, England.

Parliament of New South Wales
Political offices
| Preceded by Alfred Lutwyche | Attorney General; Feb-Oct 1859 | Succeeded by Edward Wise |
| Preceded by Alfred Lutwyche | Representative of the Government in the Legislative Council; Feb-Apr 1859 | Vacant Title next held by John Dickson |
New South Wales Legislative Assembly
| New district | Member for Mudgee; Jun-Nov 1859 | Succeeded by Samuel Terry |
