= October 1856 Cumberland (North Riding) colonial by-election =

By-election in New South Wales, Australia

A by-election was held for the New South Wales Legislative Assembly electorate of Cumberland North Riding on 16 October 1856 because John Darvall had been appointed Solicitor General in the Parker ministry.

== Dates ==
Date	Event
3 October 1856	John Darvall appointed Solicitor-General.
3 October 1856	Writ of election issued by the Speaker of the Legislative Assembly.
13 October 1856	Nominations
16 October 1856	Polling day
20 October 1856	Return of writ

== Result ==
1856 Cumberland (North Riding) by-election Thursday 16 October
Candidate	Votes	%
John Darvall (elected)	560	68.0
James Byrnes	264	32.0
Total formal votes	824	100.0
Informal votes	0	0
Turnout	824	42.9

== See also ==
- Electoral results for the district of Cumberland (North Riding)
- List of New South Wales state by-elections
