= June 1856 Cumberland (North Riding) colonial by-election =

By-election in New South Wales, Australia

A by-election was held for the New South Wales Legislative Assembly electorate of Cumberland North Riding on 19 June 1856 because John Darvall had been appointed Solicitor General in the Donaldson ministry.

== Dates ==
Date	Event
6 June 1856	John Darvall appointed Solicitor-General.
7 June 1856	Writ of election issued by the Speaker of the Legislative Assembly.
16 June 1856	Nominations
19 June 1856	Polling day
25 June 1856	Return of writ

== Result ==
1856 Cumberland (North Riding) by-election Thursday 19 June
Candidate	Votes	%
John Darvall (elected)	483	68.8
Patrick Hogan	219	31.2
Total formal votes	702	100.0
Informal votes	0	0.0
Turnout	702	36.6

== See also ==
- Electoral results for the district of Cumberland (North Riding)
- List of New South Wales state by-elections
