= Alfred Lutwyche =

Australian politician

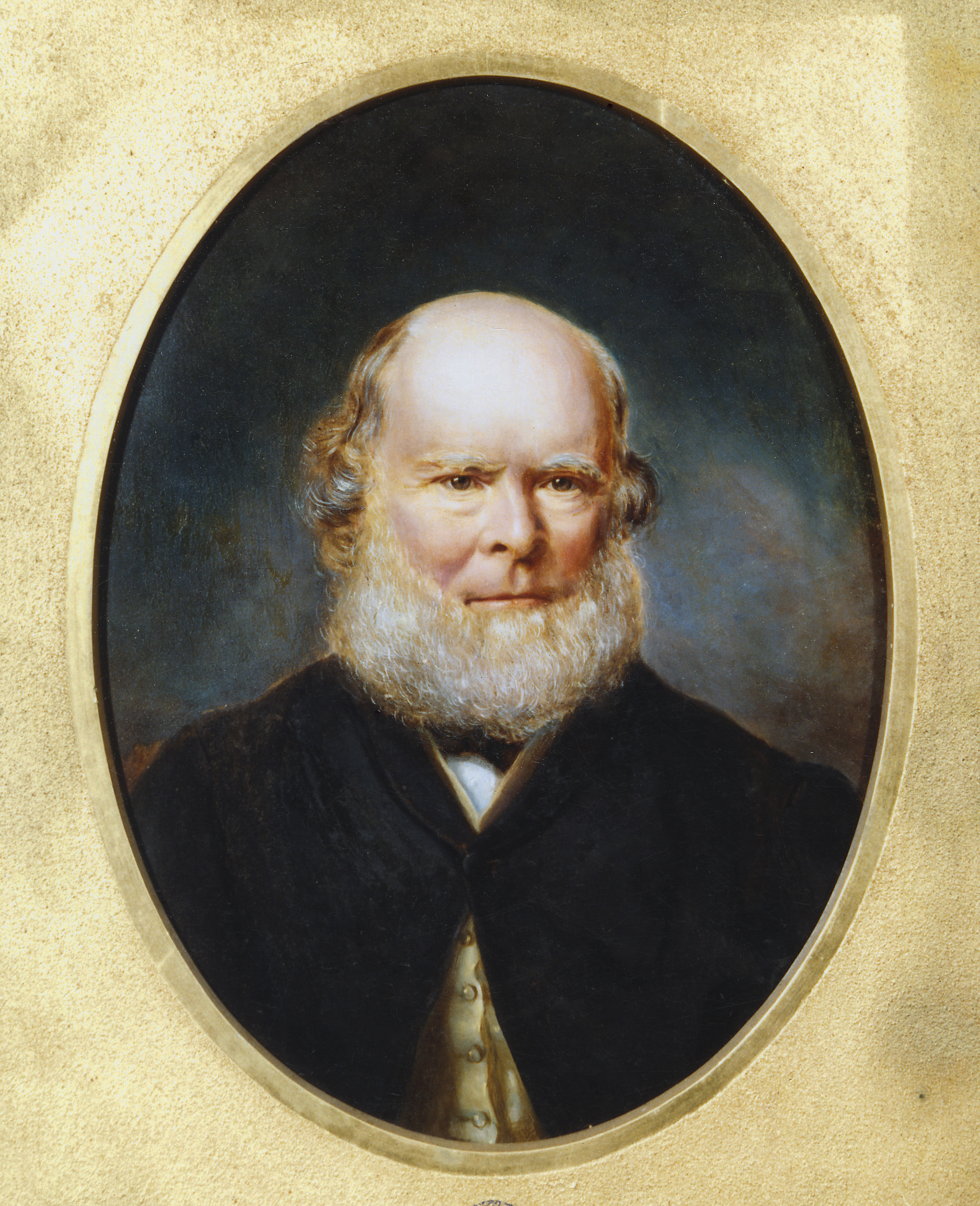
Alfred Lutwyche

Justice Alfred James Peter Lutwyche, Queen's Counsel (26 February 1810 – 12 June 1880) was the first judge of the Supreme Court Bench of Queensland.

== Early life ==
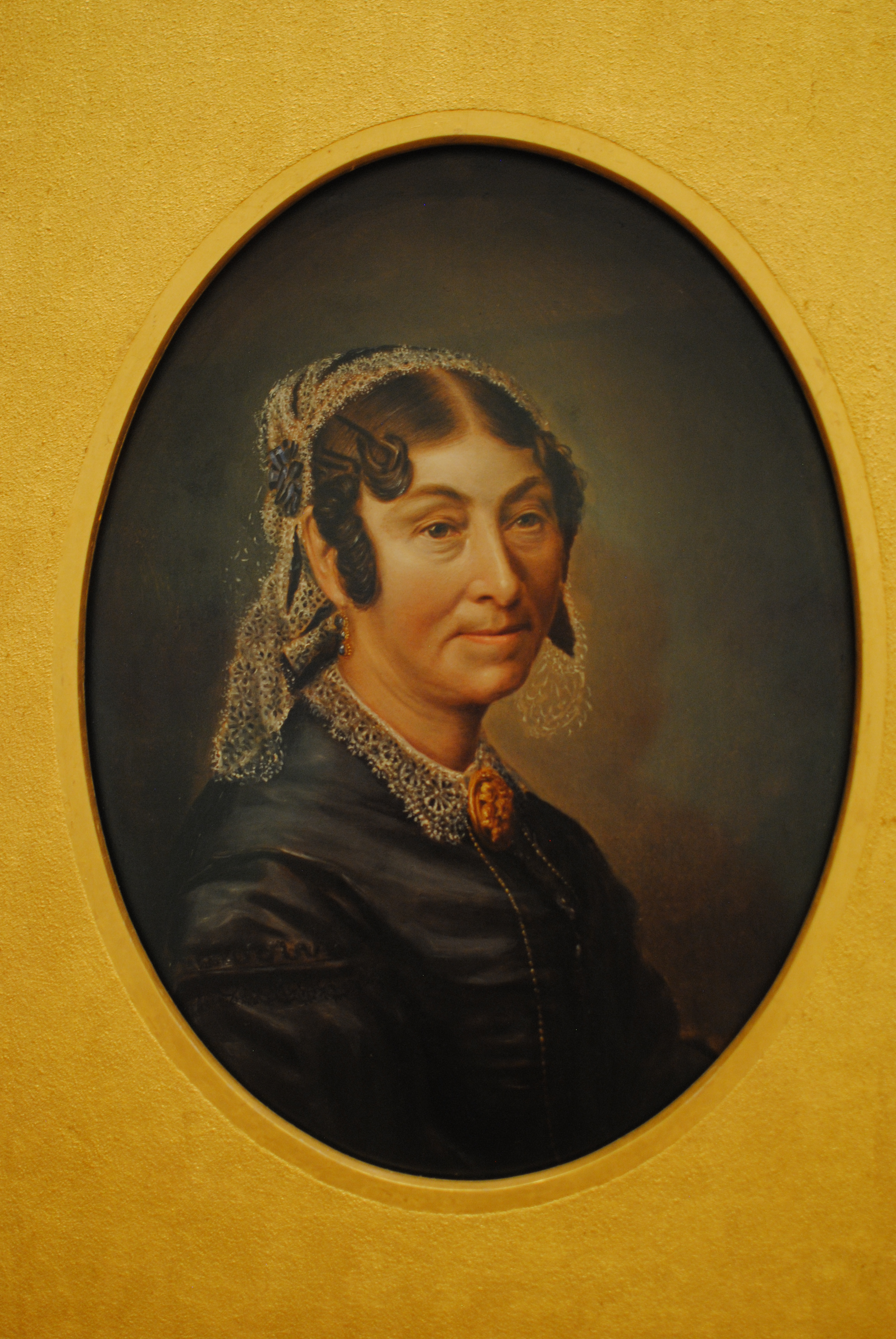
Portrait of "Mrs (Mary) Lutwyche" by unknown painter, circa 1865–1880. In the collection of Queensland Art Gallery, Brisbane.

Lutwyche was the eldest son of John Lutwyche, of a Worcestershire family, who removed to London and started as a leather merchant, under the firm of Lutwyche & George, in Skinner Street, Snow Hill. Lutwyche was educated at Charterhouse School and at the Queen's College, Oxford, where he matriculated in 1828 and graduated B.A. in 1832, and subsequently M.A. While still at university, he had decided to pursue a career in law and became a student at the Middle Temple in London. After working in the legal areas of conveyancing and special pleadings, Lutwyche was called to the bar in May 1840. As a barrister, he went on the Oxford circuit. While he built up his practice as a barrister, he also supplemented his income and acquired some journalistic experience as a colleague of Charles Dickens, on the Morning Chronicle.

== Immigration ==
Suffering poor health, Lutwyche decided to immigrate to Australia. In 1853, he embarked in London on the Meridian bound for Melbourne. The ship was wrecked on the Island of Amsterdam in the southern Indian Ocean. It was a miracle that almost all on board (apart from the captain, the cook and one passenger) survived. At the wreck site, they were faced with a 200-foot lava cliff, which the sailors scaled and then hauled up the passengers. The ship broke up before any provisions could be gathered, but they were able to catch fish, which enabled them to survive for 12 days before Captain Isaac Ludlow of the American whaler Monmouth found them and took them to Mauritius. Lutwyche then travelled on the Emma Colvin to Melbourne, arriving in December 1853.

== New South Wales ==
Having entered the New South Wales Legislative Council, he was Solicitor General in the first Cowper ministry from September to October 1856, and Representative of the Government in the Legislative Council. He was again Solicitor General in the second Cowper ministry from September 1857 to November 1858, when he succeeded James Martin QC as Attorney General. He was appointed a Queen's Counsel on 10 December 1858, shortly after his appointment as Attorney General. He resigned from the ministry and the Legislative Counsel in February 1859, in order to accept a judicial appointment.

== Queensland ==
In February 1859 Lutwyche was appointed Resident Judge of what was then the Moreton Bay district of New South Wales. Two years later, in August 1861, he became sole Judge of the new Supreme Court of Queensland, and occupied the bench unaided until the arrival of the first Chief Justice, Sir James Cockle, in February 1863. But for a certain lack of self-restraint in his judgements and utterances, Mr. Lutwyche would himself have been appointed the first Chief Justice of Queensland, and he keenly felt the disallowance of his claims.

== Personal life ==
In 1855, while in Sydney, Alfred Lutwyche married a widow, Mary Ann (Jane) Morris (née Simpson) at St Lawrence's Anglican Church. Jane (as she was commonly known) had 4 children from her marriage to George Henry Morris. The Morris family were also among the survivors of the 1853 wreck of the Meridian but George Morris succumbed to tuberculosis in 1854 in Sydney. Alfred and Jane Lutwyche had no children.

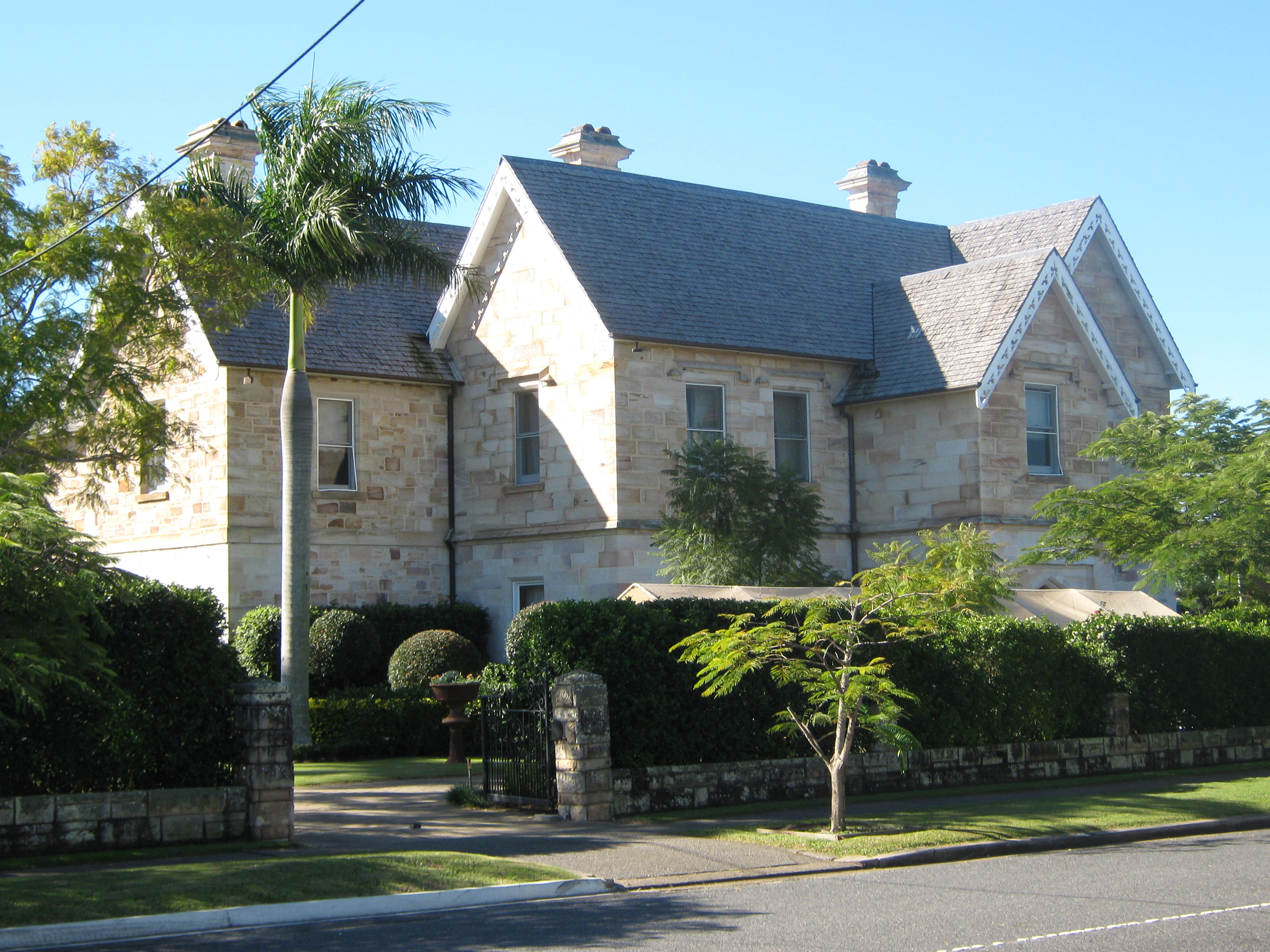
Kedron Lodge, Kalinga, Qld. Residence of Justice Lutwyche.

Lutwyche was a wealthy settler who owned vast tracts of land in Wooloowin and surrounding areas; the Kedron Lodge, his magnificent heritage-listed residence, still stands to this day in the affluent district of Kalinga.

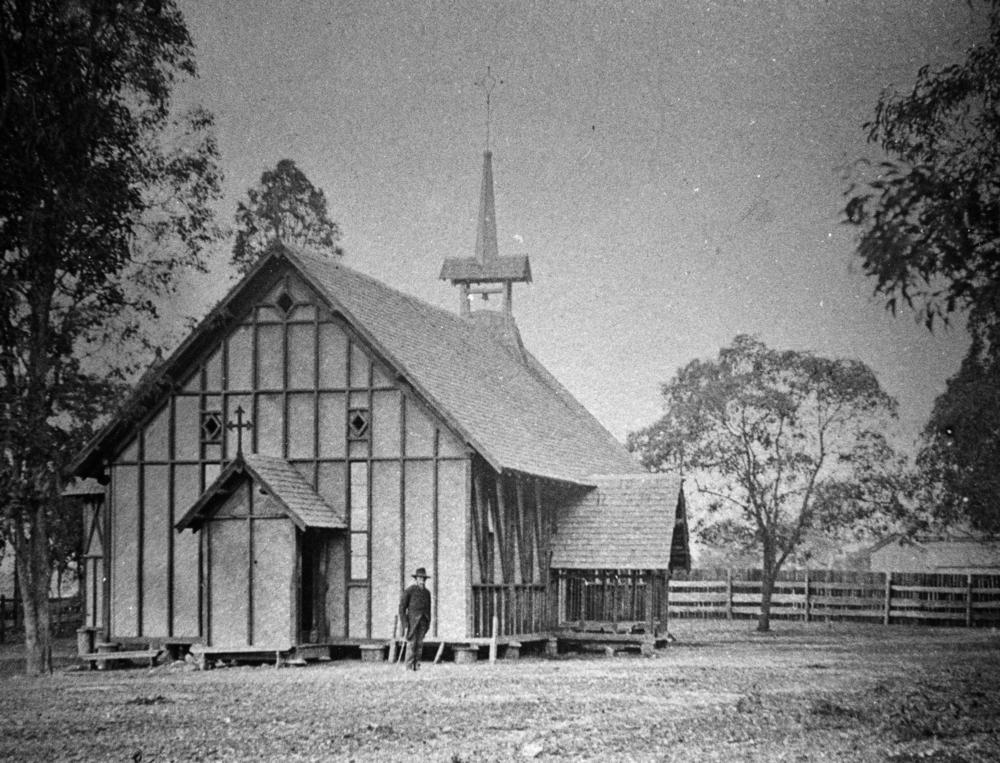
Early wooden St Andrew's Church at Lutwyche, 1888

In 1865, Lutwyche donated a block of land near Kedron Brook for the establishment of a new Anglican church, St Andrew's. A Gothic-style wooden church was built and opened on 30 November 1866. Lutwyche was an active member of the church and requested to be buried in the churchyard. He later donated a further acre of land adjacent to the church for a rectory.

== Death ==
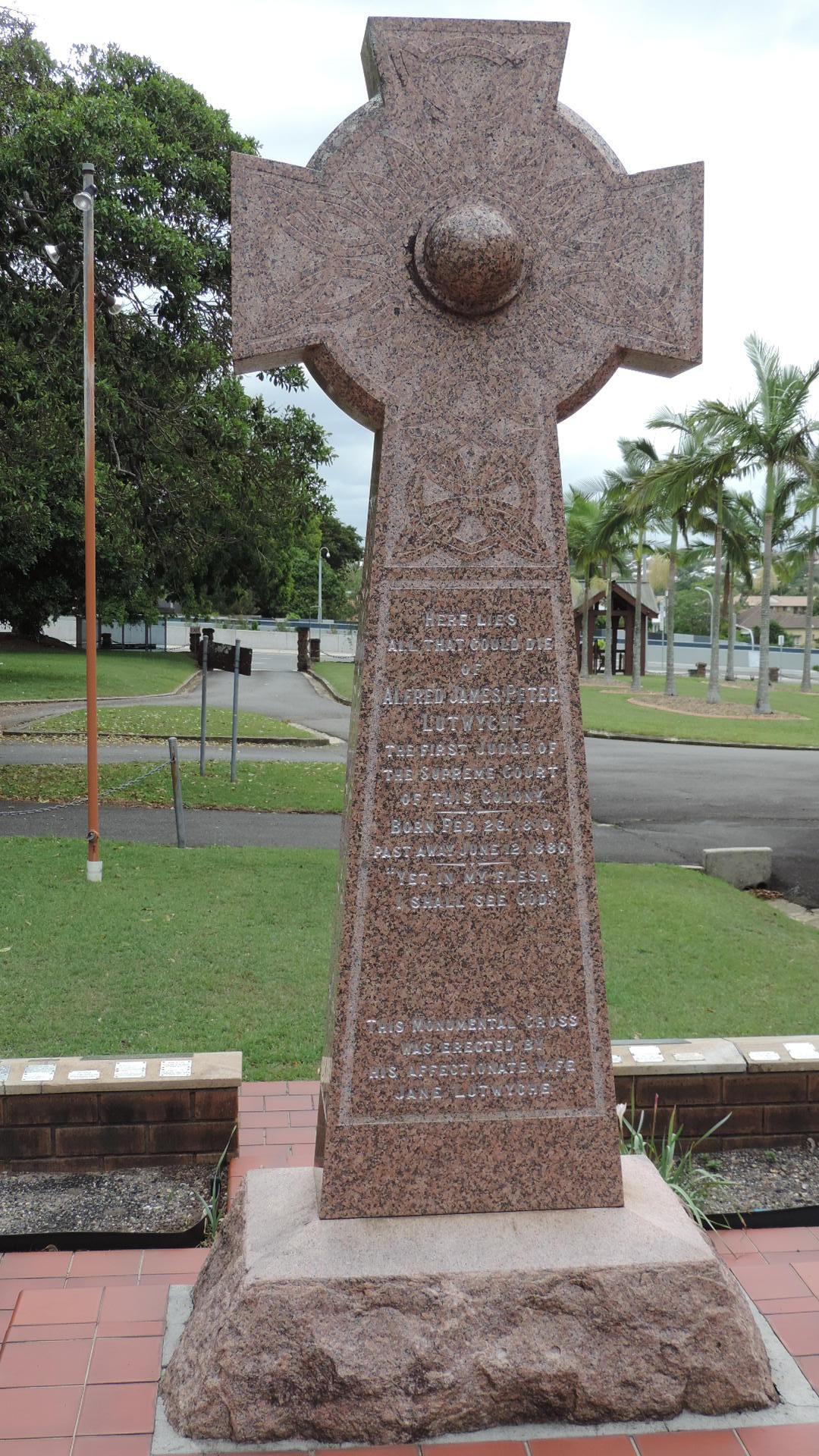
Monumental cross for Alfred Lutwyche, 2014

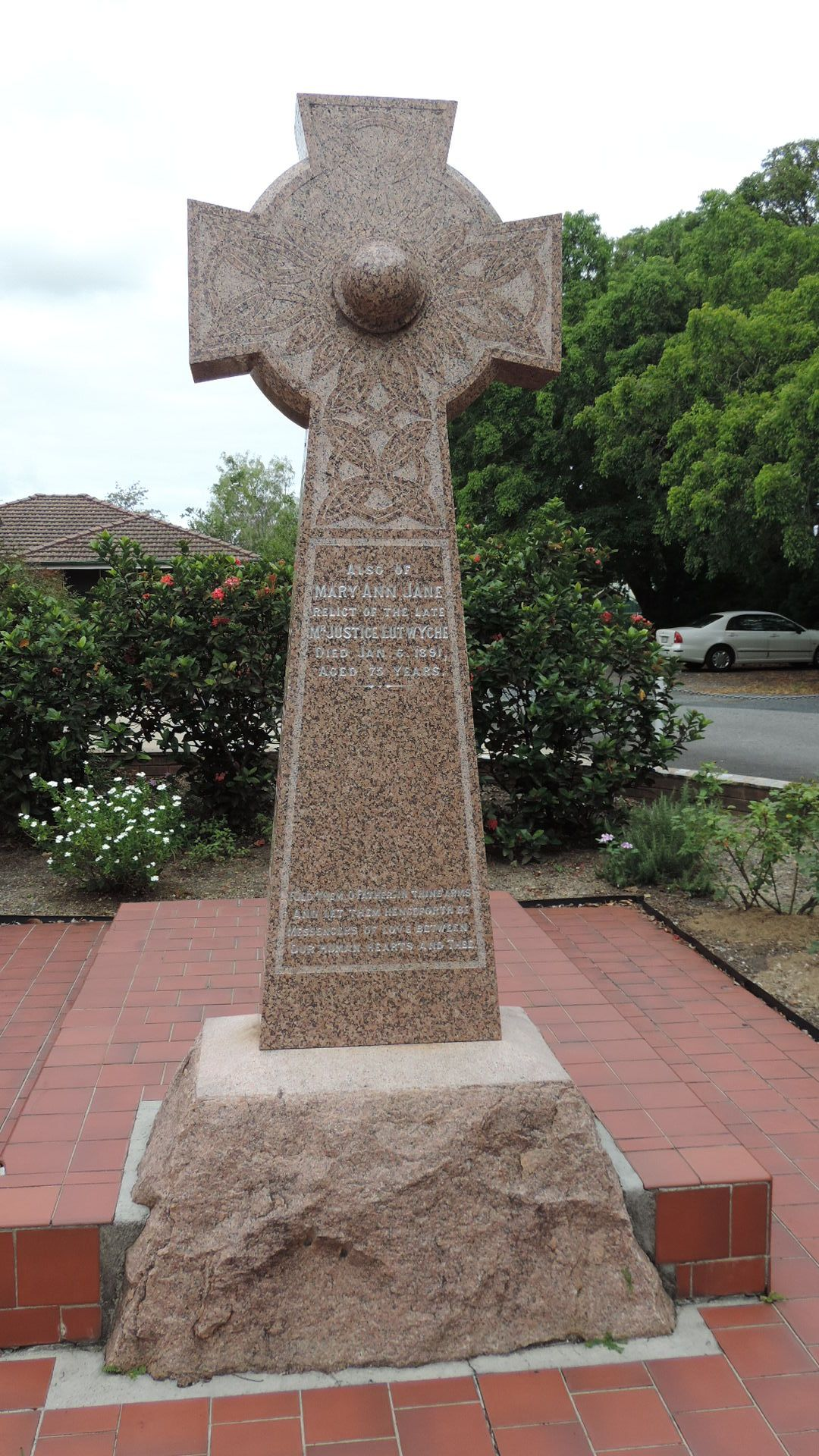
Inscription for his wife on the reverse, 2014

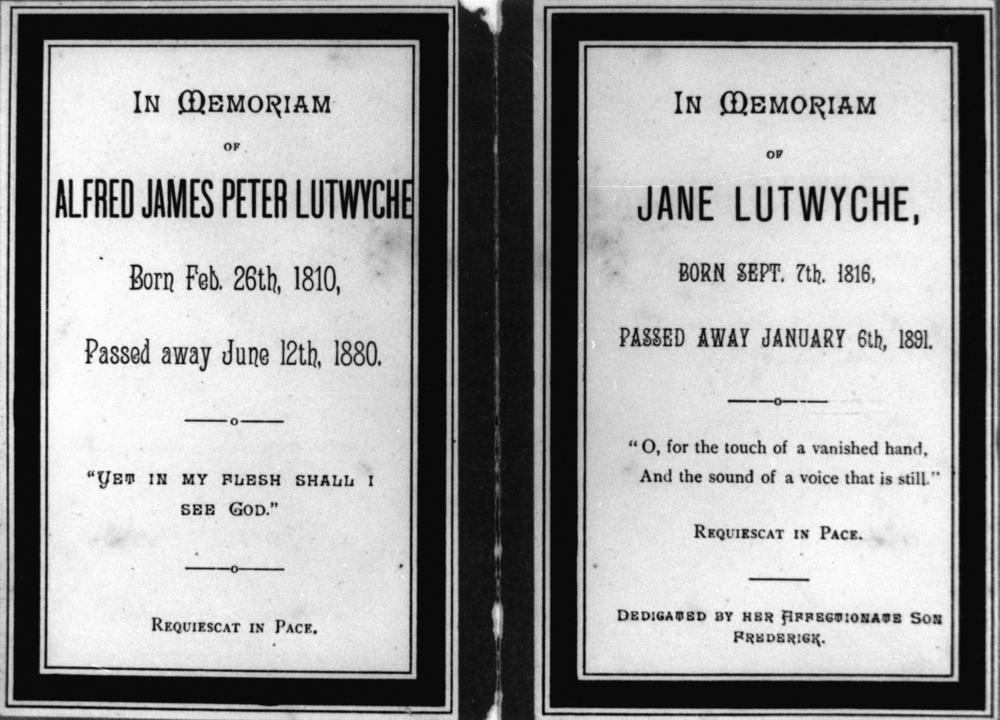
Memorial cards for Alfred James and Jane Lutwyche, buried in the churchyard of St Andrew's Anglican Church, Lutwyche, Brisbane, Queensland, Australia

Lutwyche died at his residence, Kedron Lodge, 123 Nelson Street, Wooloowin in Brisbane on 12 June 1880 following a severe attack of gout in the preceding fortnight. As he had requested, he had a simple funeral (which was nonetheless hugely attended) and was buried in the churchyard of St Andrew's Anglican Church on Lutwyche Road on 15 June 1880. The service was conducted by Archdeacon Glennie and Rev. Love. His wife Jane arranged for a Celtic cross to be erected as a memorial over his grave on the southern side of the church.

His widow Jane died at her residence Park Villa, Park Road, Lutwyche, Brisbane on 6 January 1891 and is buried with her husband in St Andrew's churchyard. A memorial cross at St Andrew's commemorates the couple.

== Legacy ==
The north Brisbane inner-city suburb of Lutwyche, the Lutwyche Cemetery in Kedron, Lutwyche Road and the Kedron State High School and Windsor State School sporting house are named in his honour.

== Publications ==
With his background in law and journalism, Lutwyche was a prolific writer. Of particular interest are the following works:

- Lutwyche, Alfred (1854), A narrative of the wreck of the Meridian, on the island of Amsterdam (PDF), Waugh and Cox

== See also ==
- Colony of New South Wales – second ministry
- Colony of New South Wales – fourth ministry

Political offices
Preceded by John Darvall	Solicitor General; September – October 1856	Succeeded by John Darvall
Preceded by William Mayne	Representative of the Government in the Legislative Council; September – October 1856	Succeeded by Edward Deas Thomson
Preceded by Edward Wise	Solicitor General; September 1857 – November 1858	Succeeded by William Dalley
Preceded by Edward Deas Thomson	Representative of the Government in the Legislative Council; November 1857 – February 1859	Succeeded by Lyttleton Bayley
Preceded by James Martin QC	Attorney General; November 1858 – February 1859	Succeeded by Lyttleton Bayley
