= John Kinchela =

Irish-Australian barrister, politician and judge

John Kinchela (1774 – 21 July 1845) was an Irish-Australian barrister, politician and judge.

He was born in Kilkenny to merchant and bleacher John Kinchela and Rosina. Kinchela went to Kilkenny College. He attended Trinity College, Dublin, where he studied law, and from 1798 was a barrister. He was an alderman at Kilkenny in 1817 and served as mayor in 1819. On 4 April 1796 he married Elizabeth Thornton, with whom he had three children; following her death, he married Anne Bourne on 19 February 1807 and had a further three children.

In 1825 he was sent to the West Indies, and after a period in London he was sent to New South Wales as Attorney General in 1831. He held the role until 1836, when he was appointed an acting judge on the Supreme Court. He retired in 1837 to become deputy commissary in the Vice Admiralty Court, and in 1840 he became master of equity. He retired for good in 1841 due to ill health, and died at Liverpool in 1845.

Political offices
Preceded by William Moore as acting	Attorney-General; 25 Jun 1831 – 18 Apr 1836	Succeeded by John Plunkett
