= 1856 Parramatta colonial by-election =

By-election in New South Wales, Australia

A by-election was held for the New South Wales Legislative Assembly electorate of Parramatta on 11 October 1856 because Henry Parker had been appointed Premier and Colonial Secretary, forming the Parker ministry.

== Dates ==
Date	Event
3 October 1856	Henry Parker was appointed Premier and Colonial Secretary.
3 October 1856	Writ of election issued by the Speaker of the Legislative Assembly.
10 October 1856	Nominations
11 October 1856	Polling day
20 October 1856	Return of writ

== Result ==
1856 Parramatta by-election Saturday 11 October
Candidate	Votes	%
Henry Parker (re-elected)	279	51.9
James Byrnes	259	48.1
Total formal votes	538	100.0
Informal votes	0	0.0
Turnout	538	71.1

== See also ==
- Electoral results for the district of Parramatta
- List of New South Wales state by-elections
