= October 1856 Cumberland (South Riding) colonial by-election =

By-election in New South Wales, Australia

A by-election was held for the New South Wales Legislative Assembly electorate of Cumberland South Riding on 17 October 1856 because William Manning was appointed Attorney-General in the Parker ministry.

== Dates ==
| Date | Event |
|---|---|
| 3 October 1856 | William Manning was appointed Attorney-General. |
| 3 October 1856 | Writ of election issued by the Speaker of the Legislative Assembly. |
| 14 October 1856 | Nominations |
| 17 October 1856 | Polling day |
| 20 October 1856 | Return of writ |

== Result ==
1856 Cumberland (South Riding) by-election Friday 17 October
| Candidate | Votes | % |
|---|---|---|
| William Manning (elected) | 893 | 80.6 |
| William Redman | 215 | 19.4 |
| Total formal votes | 1,108 | 100.0 |
| Informal votes | 0 | 0 |
| Turnout | 1,108 | 40.3 |

== See also ==
- Electoral results for the district of Cumberland (South Riding)
- List of New South Wales state by-elections
