= June 1863 East Maitland colonial by-election =

By-election in New South Wales, Australia

A by-election was held for the New South Wales Legislative Assembly electorate of East Maitland on 18 June 1863 because of the death of James Dickson.

== Dates ==
Date	Event
28 April 1863	James Dickson died.
8 June 1863	Writ of election issued by the Speaker of the Legislative Assembly.
17 June 1863	Nominations.
18 June 1863	Polling day
22 June 1863	Return of writ

== Result ==
June 1863 East Maitland by-election Thursday, 18 June
Candidate	Votes	%
John Darvall (elected)	194	50.7
Archibald Hamilton	189	49.4
Total formal votes	383	100.0
Informal votes	0	0.0
Turnout	383	49.9

== See also ==
- Electoral results for the district of East Maitland
- List of New South Wales state by-elections
