= Electoral results for the district of Sydney Hamlets =

Election results for Sydney Hamlets, New South Wales, Australia

Sydney Hamlets, an electoral district of the Legislative Assembly in the Australian state of New South Wales, had two incarnations, from 1950 until 1971 and from 1988 until 1999.

Election	Member	Party	Member	Party
1856	Stuart Donaldson	None	Sir Daniel Cooper	None
Jun 1856 by	Stuart Donaldson	None	Sir Daniel Cooper	None
Oct 1856 by	John Campbell	None	Sir Daniel Cooper	None
1858	John Campbell	None	Sir Daniel Cooper	None

== Election results ==
=== 1858 ===
1858 New South Wales colonial election: Sydney Hamlets 13 January
Candidate	Votes	%
John Campbell (re-elected 1)	891	35.1
Sir Daniel Cooper (re-elected 2)	876	34.5
Robert Tooth	773	30.4
Total formal votes	2,540	100.0
Informal votes	0	0.0
Turnout	2,540	34.4

=== October 1856 by-election ===
October 1856 Sydney Hamlets by-election 10 October
Candidate	Votes	%
John Campbell (elected)	870	55.7
Stuart Donaldson (defeated)	691	44.3
Total formal votes	1,561	100.0
Informal votes	0	0.0
Turnout	1,561	51.6

Stuart Donaldson was appointed Colonial Treasurer in the Parker ministry.

=== June 1856 by-election ===
1856 Sydney Hamlets by-election Tuesday 17 June
Candidate	Votes	%
Stuart Donaldson (elected)	883	63.4
John Campbell	510	36.6
Total formal votes	1,393	100.0
Informal votes	0	0
Turnout	1,393	46.0

Stuart Donaldson was appointed Colonial Secretary forming the Donaldson ministry.

=== 1856 ===
1856 New South Wales colonial election: Sydney Hamlets
Candidate	Votes	%
Daniel Cooper (elected 1)	867	40.9
Stuart Donaldson (elected 2)	688	32.5
Richard Driver	415	19.6
Merion Moriarty	150	7.1
Total formal votes	2,120	100.0
Informal votes	0	0.0
Turnout	2,120	39.8

Polling was conducted on 11 March 1856. Both Donaldson and Cooper served in the old Legislative Council, Donaldson representing Sydney Hamlets and Cooper Murray and St Vincent.
