= John Plunkett =

Australian politician (1802–1869)

John Plunkett QC
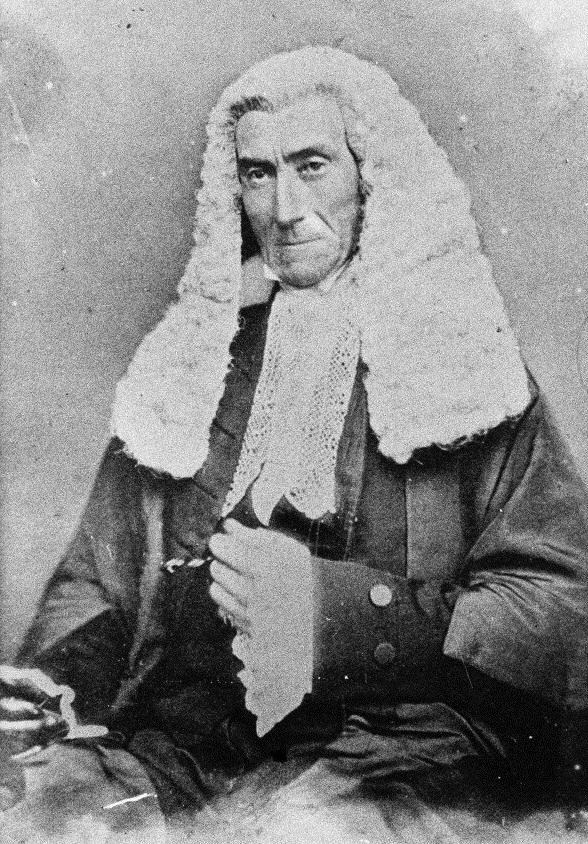

5th Attorney-General of New South Wales
- In office 17 September 1836 – 5 June 1856
- Preceded by: John Kinchela
- Succeeded by: William Manning
- In office 25 August 1865 – 21 January 1866
- Preceded by: John Darvall QC
- Succeeded by: James Martin QC

2nd Solicitor-General of New South Wales
- In office 14 June 1832 – 16 September 1836
- Preceded by: Edward MacDowell
- Succeeded by: William à Beckett

Personal details
- Born: John Hubert Plunkett; June 1802 Mount Plunkett, County Roscommon, Ireland
- Died: 9 May 1869 (aged 66) East Melbourne, Victoria, Australia
- Education: Trinity College Dublin (B.A.)
- Occupation: Politician

John Hubert Plunkett QC (June 1802 – 9 May 1869) was Attorney-General of New South Wales, an appointed member of the Legislative Council 1836–41, 1843–56, 1857–58 and 1861–69. He was also elected as a member of the Legislative Assembly 1856–60. He is best known for the prosecution of the colonists who brutally murdered 28 Aboriginals in the Myall Creek Massacre of 1838, seven of whom were convicted and hanged.

== Early life ==
John Hubert Plunkett was born at Mount Plunkett, County Roscommon, Ireland, the younger of twins and son of George Plunkett and his wife Eileen, née O'Kelly. Plunkett entered Trinity College Dublin, in November 1819 (graduating B.A. in 1824) and was called to the Irish bar in 1826 and later to the English bar. He practised as a barrister on the Connaught circuit in 1826–32 with distinction, fought for Catholic Emancipation, and was given credit by Daniel O'Connell for the success of the Whig candidates in Connaught at the general election in 1830. According to Mark Tedeschi, in his legal career he was influenced by the trials of his ancestor Oliver Plunkett https://catalogue.nla.gov.au/catalog/7426435 .

== Legal career in Australia ==
In 1831, Plunkett was appointed Solicitor-General of New South Wales, on a salary of £800. Plunkett, his wife, sister and four female servants arrived in Sydney on the Southworth in June 1832. The attorney-general at the time, John Kinchela, was deaf and Plunkett had to undertake most of his duties. In February 1836, Kinchela retired from his position and Plunkett took his place. Later in 1836, Plunkett was associated with Governor Richard Bourke in bringing about a new church and schools act. He was determined to establish equality before the law, first by extending jury rights to emancipists; he then extended legal protections to convicts and assigned servants. Finally Plunkett attempted to legally protect aboriginals, and twice charged the perpetrators of the Myall Creek massacre with murder. The first trial resulted in acquittal on a technical point; however, the second resulted in a conviction. Plunkett's Church Building Act 1836 disestablished the Church of England and established legal equality between Anglicans, Catholics, Presbyterians and later Methodists.

Plunkett obtained leave of absence to attend to family matters in Ireland from late 1841, and did not return to Sydney until August 1843. Roger Therry was appointed acting attorney-general in May 1841, to serve during Plunkett's absence. Following the death of Chief Justice Sir James Dowling in September 1844, Plunkett asserted that he should be offered the vacant position as a right of his position as Attorney-General. The Executive Council rejected his claimed right to the position, and Supreme Court judge Alfred Stephen was appointed.

A theme from "Twofold Bay Waltzes" 1864 dedicated to Plunkett by his niece
MIDI version

== Family ==
John Plunkett's niece, Georgina Isabella O'Sullivan (née Keon), was a daughter of Ferdinand Keon (1794-1876) and Plunkett's sister Margaret. Georgina published "Twofold Bay Waltzes" in 1864, dedicated to her uncle, John Plunkett. The Cover artwork shows a view from the Eden residence of her brother George Plunkett Keon JP, a police magistrate who was buried in 1899 with his brother Hubert Keon.

New South Wales Legislative Assembly
New district	Member for Bathurst (County); 1856	Succeeded by William Suttor
New district	Member for Argyle; 1856 – 1857	Succeeded by Daniel Deniehy
Preceded by James Pye	Member for Cumberland (North Riding); 1858 – 1859; With: Henry Parkes / Thomas Smith	District abolished
New district	Member for West Sydney; 1859 – 1860; With: Thomas Broughton; John Lang; James Pemell	Succeeded by Daniel Dalgleish
Political offices
Preceded by Edward MacDowell	Solicitor General; 14 Jun 1832 – 16 Sep 1836	Succeeded by William à Beckett
Preceded by John Kinchela	Attorney-General; 17 Sep 1836 – 5 Jun 1856	Succeeded by William Manning
Preceded by John Darvall	Attorney-General; 25 Aug 1865 – 21 Jan 1866	Succeeded by James Martin
