= November 1856 Cumberland (South Riding) colonial by-election =

By-election in New South Wales, Australia

A by-election was held for the New South Wales Legislative Assembly electorate of Cumberland South Riding in November 1856 because the Qualifications Committee declared the August by-election which returned Ryan Brenan was invalid as no poll had been conducted at Canterbury. Brenan was persuaded not to stand to allow Stuart Donaldson to regain a seat, having lost Sydney Hamlets in a ministerial by-election. A committee had been formed to secure the return of Augustus Morris, however it is unclear as to why he was not nominated.

== Dates ==
Date	Event
21 August 1856	Poll for by-election held.
25 August 1856	Declaration of the poll, with the returning officer noting no poll was held at Canterbury.
27 August 1856	Petition lodged by Augustus Morris.
23 May 1856	Committee of Elections and Qualifications appointed
16 September 1856	Petition referred to the Committee of Elections and Qualifications.
28 October 1856	Committee of Elections and Qualifications declared that the August by-election was void.
29 October 1856	Writ of election issued by the Speaker of the Legislative Assembly.
4 November 1856	Nominations.
7 November 1856	Polling day
10 November 1856	Return of writ

== Result ==
1856 Cumberland (South Riding) by-election Tuesday 4 November
Candidate	Votes	%
Stuart Donaldson (elected)	unopposed	

== See also ==
- Electoral results for the district of Cumberland (South Riding)
- List of New South Wales state by-elections
