= James Pye =

Australian politician

Member of the New South Wales Parliament for Cumberland (North Riding)
- In office 1856–1858 Serving with John Darvall
- Preceded by: first Assembly
- Succeeded by: Henry Parkes

Personal details
- Born: 1 January 1801 Toongabbie, New South Wales
- Died: 30 December 1884 (aged 83) Parramatta, New South Wales
- Occupation: Orchardist

James Pye (1801 – 30 December 1884) was an Australian orchardist and politician. He was a member of the New South Wales Legislative Assembly for one term between 1856 and 1858.

== Early life ==
Pye was the son of a pioneer Australian orchardist. After an elementary education he joined his father's business and eventually had large orchards in the Field of Mars and Seven Hills district. It was reported to be the largest “orange grove” in the world at the time. He founded the Cumberland Agricultural Society in 1857 and was active in the Royal Agricultural Society of New South Wales. Pye was the patron of numerous organisations in the Parramatta region including the National School Board. He was an alderman on Parramatta Municipality between 1861 and 1884 and Mayor in 1866–7.

In the 1850s, Pye offered the land surrounding Hunts Creek at nominal cost to the Government to enable the construction of dam and reservoir, known as Lake Parramatta, that operated as a permanent water supply to the City of Parramatta between 1856 and 1909.

== Colonial Parliament ==
In 1856, Pye was elected as one of the two members for Cumberland (North Riding) in the first New South Wales Legislative Assembly under responsible government. In parliament he was noted for his attacks on the luxurious living of the working class, noting that "not one in twenty was worth employing and the native born were particularly idle". At the 1858 election, he was a candidate for Parramatta where he was comprehensively beaten.

New South Wales Legislative Assembly
Preceded by First election	Member for Cumberland (North Riding); 1856 – 1857; Served alongside: Darvall	Succeeded by Henry Parkes
