= Attorney General of New South Wales =

Chief law officer for the state of New South Wales, Australia

- Coat of arms of New South Wales

- Flag of New South Wales

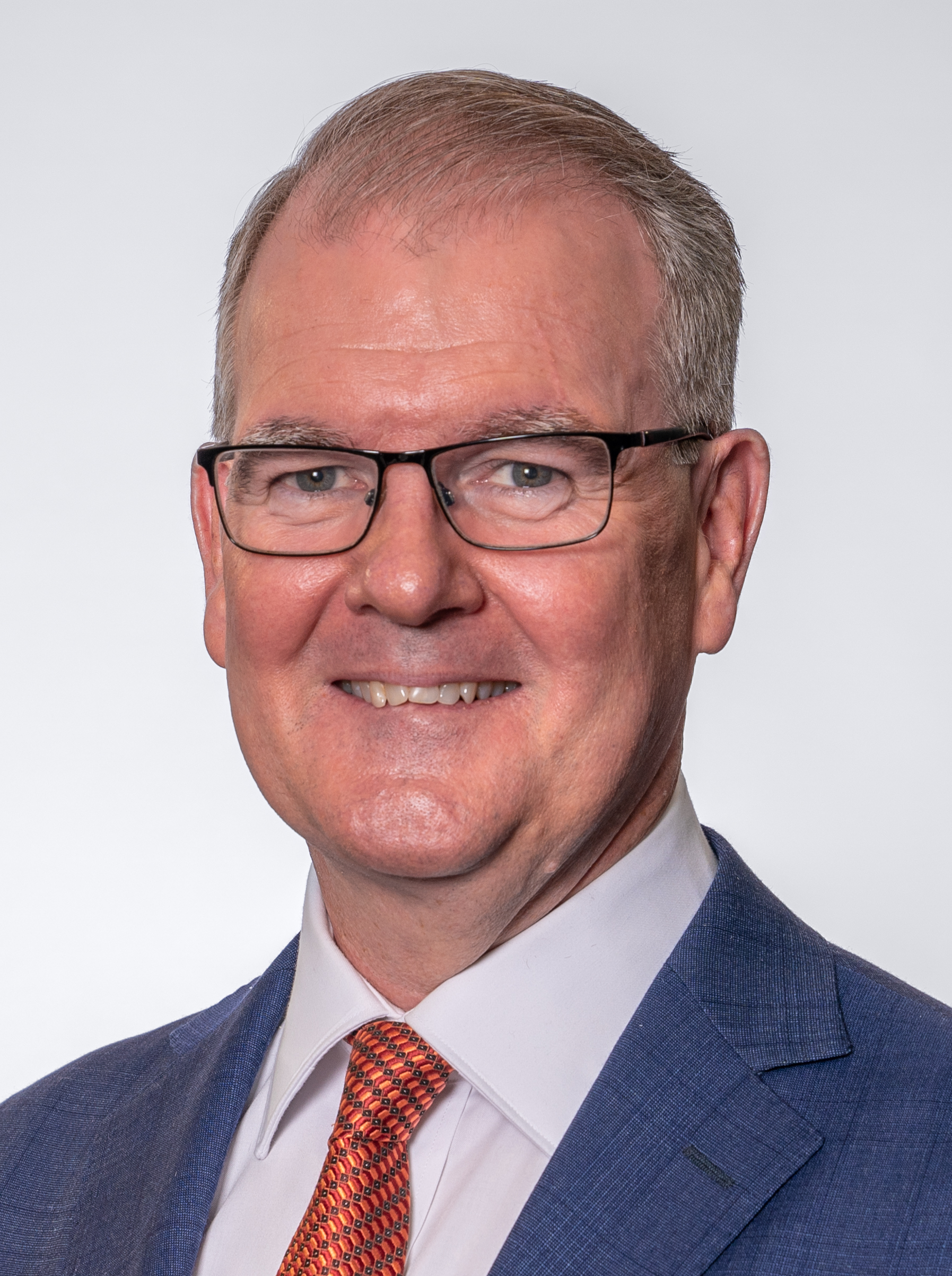
- Incumbent; Michael Daley since 28 March 2023
- Department of Communities and Justice
- Style: The Honourable
- Member of: Parliament; Cabinet; Executive Council
- Reports to: Premier of New South Wales
- Seat: 52 Martin Place, Sydney
- Nominator: Premier of New South Wales
- Appointer: Governor of New South Wales on the advice of the premier
- Term length: At the governor's pleasure
- Formation: 14 April 1824
- First holder: Saxe Bannister
- Deputy: Solicitor General
- Website: www.justice.nsw.gov.au

The attorney general of New South Wales, in formal contexts also attorney-general or attorney general for New South Wales and usually known simply as the attorney general, is a minister in the Government of New South Wales who has responsibility for the administration of justice in New South Wales, Australia. In addition, the attorney general is one of the Law Officers of the Crown. Along with the subordinate solicitor general, crown advocate, and crown solicitor, the attorney general serves as the chief legal and constitutional adviser of the Crown and Government of New South Wales.

The current attorney general, since 28 March 2023, is Michael Daley.

The attorney general and the ministers administer the portfolio through the Stronger Communities cluster, in particular the Department of Communities and Justice and a range of other government agencies.

Ultimately, the attorney general and the ministers are responsible to the Parliament of New South Wales.

== History and function ==
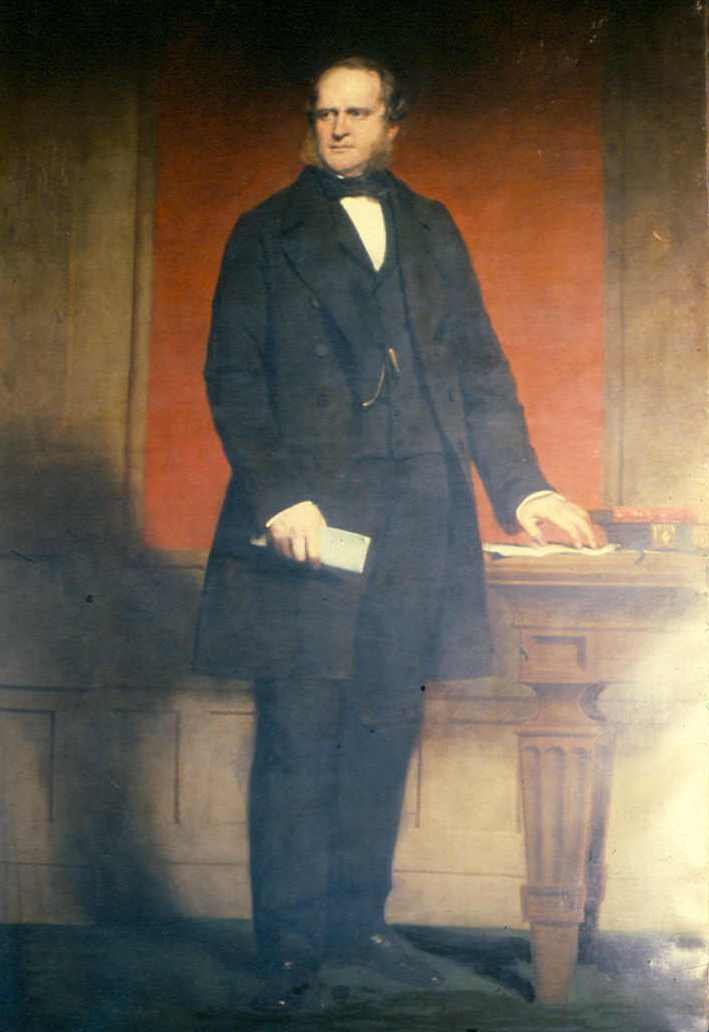
Sir William Montagu Manning, Solicitor-General: 1844–1848; Chancellor of Sydney University: 1878–1895.

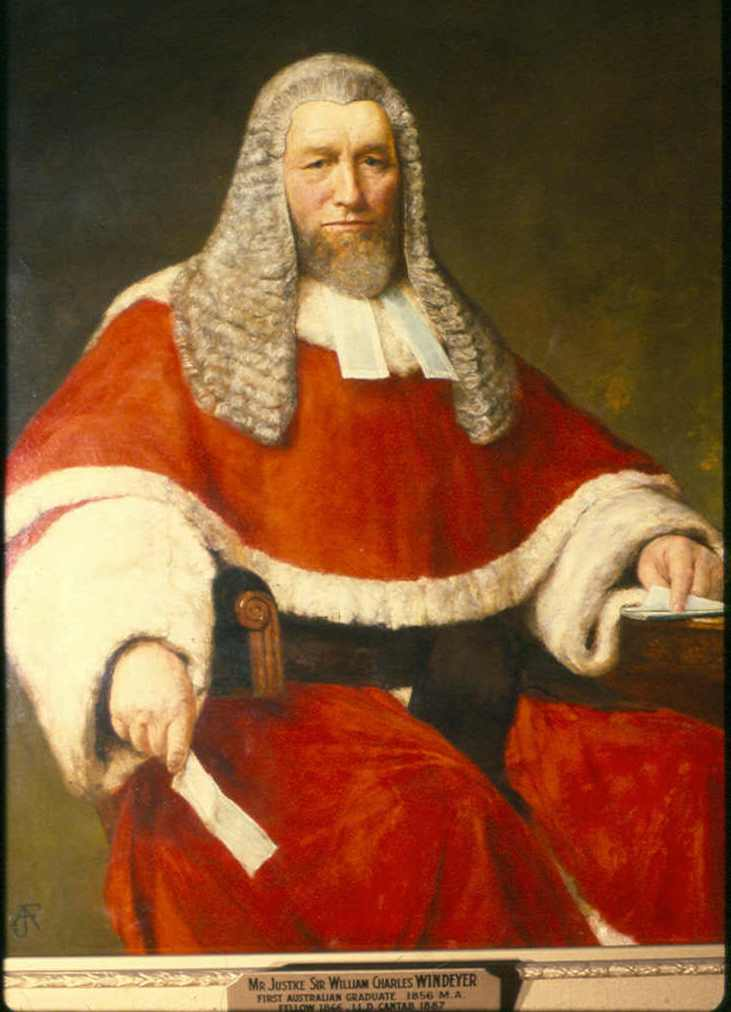
Sir William Charles Windeyer, Judge of the Supreme Court of New South Wales: 1881–1896; Chancellor of Sydney University: 1895–1898.

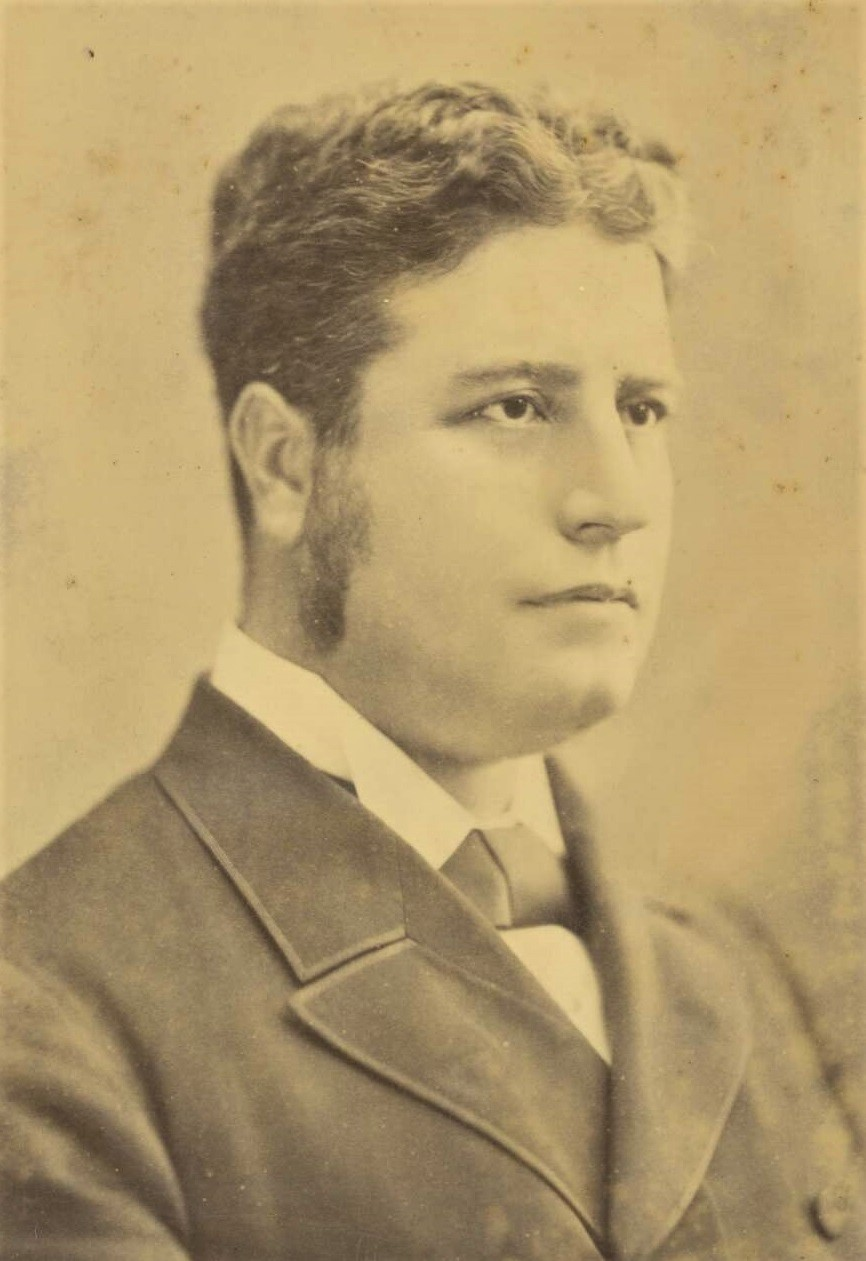
Sir Edmund Barton, Prime Minister of Australia: 1901–1903; Judge of the High Court of Australia: 1903–1920.

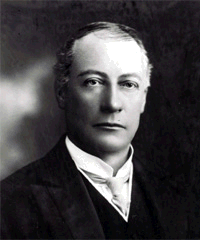
Sir Charles Wade, Premier of New South Wales: 1907–1910; Judge of the Supreme Court of New South Wales: 1920–1922.

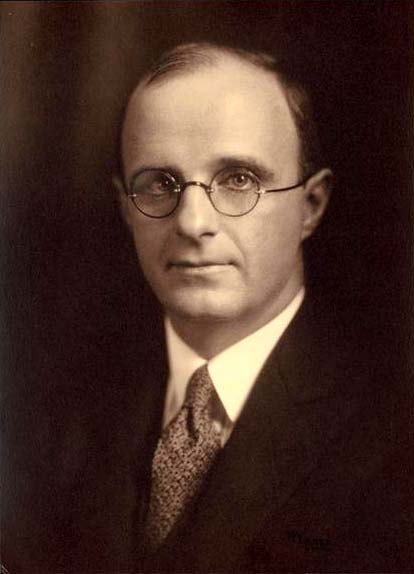
Sir Edward McTiernan, Justice of the High Court of Australia: 1930–1976.

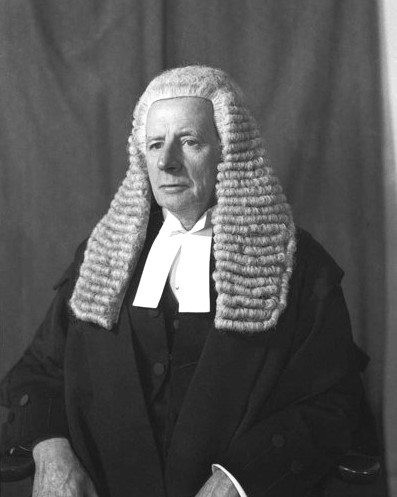
Sir Henry Manning, First leader of the Opposition in the Legislative Council: 1941–1958.

The position of Attorney General has existed since 1824, well before the full establishment of the New South Wales Parliament (in 1856) but coinciding with the establishment of the New South Wales Legislative Council. From the beginning, the attorney general has been the Crown's advisor and representative in legal matters. It was modelled after the office of the Attorney General for England and Wales. As such the attorney general advises and represents the Crown and government departments in court. The person appointed to this role provides legal advice to the Government, acts as the representative of the public interest and resolves issues between government departments.

The attorney general also has supervisory powers over the prosecution of criminal offences, but is not personally involved with prosecutions. Today, prosecutions are carried out by the Public Prosecution Office and most legal advice to government departments is provided by the Government Legal Service, both under the supervision of the attorney general. The attorney general may appeal cases to the higher courts where, although the particular case is settled, there may be a point of law of public importance at issue. The attorney general is responsible to Parliament for activities of the Department of Justice and has responsibility for the all state's courts and tribunals and the appointment of judges, magistrates and statutory officers in New South Wales.

== List of ministers ==
=== Attorneys general ===
The following individuals have served as Attorney General of New South Wales:

Ordinal	Attorney General	Party	Term begin	Term end	Time in office
1	Saxe Bannister	Not a member of Legislative Council	14 April 1824	13 October 1826	2 years, 182 days
2	William Henry Moore (acting)	Not a member of Legislative Council	13 October 1826	31 July 1827	291 days
3	Alexander Baxter (Note: Baxter was subsequently appointed to the Legislative Council on 30 January 1829.)	Not a member of Legislative Council	1 August 1827	24 January 1831	3 years, 176 days
–	William Henry Moore (acting)	Not a member of Legislative Council	24 January 1831	24 June 1831	151 days
4	John Kinchela	Prior to responsible government	25 June 1831	18 April 1836	4 years, 298 days
5	John Plunkett	Prior to responsible government	17 September 1836	5 June 1856	19 years, 262 days
6	William Manning	No party	6 June 1856	25 August 1856	80 days
7	James Martin	No party	26 August 1856	2 October 1856	37 days
–	William Manning	No party	3 October 1856	25 May 1857	1 year, 80 days
8	John Darvall	No party	26 May 1857	7 September 1857	104 days
–	James Martin QC	No party	7 September 1857	8 November 1858	1 year, 62 days
9	Alfred Lutwyche QC	No party	15 November 1858	21 February 1859	98 days
10	Lyttleton Bayley	No party	21 February 1859	26 October 1859	247 days
11	Edward Wise	No party	27 October 1859	13 February 1860	109 days
–	Sir William Manning QC	No party	21 February 1860	8 March 1860	16 days
12	John Hargrave	No party	2 April 1860	31 July 1863	3 years, 120 days
–	John Darvall QC	No party	1 August 1863	15 October 1863	75 days
–	James Martin QC (Note: Concurrently Premier of New South Wales.)	No party	16 October 1863	2 February 1865	1 year, 109 days
–	John Darvall QC	No party	3 February 1865	20 June 1865	137 days
–	John Plunkett QC	No party	25 August 1865	21 January 1866	149 days
–	James Martin QC	No party	22 January 1866	26 October 1868	2 years, 278 days
–	Sir William Manning QC	No party	21 October 1868	15 December 1870	2 years, 55 days
–	Sir James Martin QC	No party	16 December 1870	13 May 1872	1 year, 149 days
13	Edward Butler	No party	15 May 1872	10 November 1873	1 year, 179 days
14	Joseph Innes	No party	20 November 1873	8 February 1875	1 year, 80 days
15	William Dalley	No party	9 February 1875	21 March 1877	2 years, 40 days
16	William Windeyer	No party	22 March 1877	16 August 1877	147 days
–	William Dalley QC	No party	17 August 1877	17 December 1877	122 days
17	William Foster	No party	18 December 1877	20 December 1878	1 year, 2 days
–	William Windeyer	No party	21 December 1878	10 August 1879	232 days
18	Robert Wisdom	No party	13 August 1879	4 January 1883	3 years, 144 days
–	William Dalley QC	No party	5 January 1883	6 October 1885	2 years, 274 days
19	Jack Want	No party	7 October 1885	21 December 1885	75 days
20	George Simpson	No party	22 December 1885	25 February 1886	65 days
–	Jack Want	No party	26 February 1886	19 January 1887	327 days
–	William Foster QC	Free Trade	20 January 1887	18 May 1887	118 days
21	Bernhard Wise	Free Trade	27 May 1887	7 February 1888	256 days
–	George Simpson QC	Free Trade	10 February 1888	16 January 1889	341 days
22	Edmund Barton	Protectionist	17 January 1889	7 March 1889	49 days
–	George Simpson QC	Free Trade	8 March 1889	22 October 1891	2 years, 228 days
–	Edmund Barton QC	Protectionist	23 October 1891	14 December 1893	2 years, 52 days
23	Charles Heydon	Protectionist	15 December 1893	2 August 1894	230 days
–	George Simpson QC	Free Trade	3 August 1894	1 December 1894	120 days
–	Jack Want QC	Free Trade	18 December 1894	18 April 1899	4 years, 121 days
24	George Reid QC	Free Trade	19 April 1899	13 September 1899	147 days
–	Bernhard Wise QC	Protectionist / Progressive	14 September 1899	14 June 1904	4 years, 274 days
25	James Gannon	Progressive	15 June 1904	29 August 1904	75 days
26	Charles Wade QC (Note: Premier of New South Wales from 2 October 1907)	Liberal Reform	29 August 1904	20 October 1910	6 years, 52 days
27	William Holman	Labor	21 October 1910	29 January 1914	3 years, 100 days
28	David Hall	Labor	29 January 1914	15 November 1916	2 years, 291 days
28	David Hall	Nationalist	15 November 1916	23 July 1919	2 years, 250 days
29	John Garland	Nationalist	23 July 1919	12 April 1920	264 days
30	Edward McTiernan	Labor	12 April 1920	20 December 1921	1 year, 252 days
31	Thomas Bavin	Nationalist	20 December 1921	20 December 1921	7 hours
–	Edward McTiernan	Labor	20 December 1921	13 April 1922	114 days
–	Thomas Bavin	Nationalist	13 April 1922	17 June 1925	3 years, 65 days
–	Edward McTiernan	Labor	17 June 1925	26 May 1927	1 year, 343 days
32	Andrew Lysaght	Labor	27 May 1927	18 October 1927	144 days
33	Francis Boyce	Nationalist	18 October 1927	3 November 1930	3 years, 16 days
–	Andrew Lysaght	Labor	4 November 1930	16 June 1931	224 days
34	Joseph Lamaro	Labor	16 June 1931	15 October 1931	121 days
34	Joseph Lamaro	Labor (NSW)	15 October 1931	13 May 1932	211 days
35	Daniel Levy	United Australia	16 May 1932	17 June 1932	32 days
36	Henry Manning	United Australia	18 June 1932	16 May 1941	8 years, 332 days
37	Clarrie Martin	Labor	16 May 1941	23 February 1953	11 years, 283 days
38	Bill Sheahan	Labor	23 February 1953	15 March 1956	3 years, 21 days
39	Reg Downing	Labor	15 March 1956	13 May 1965	9 years, 59 days
40	Ken McCaw	Liberal	13 May 1965	3 January 1975	9 years, 235 days
41	John Maddison	Liberal	3 January 1975	14 May 1976	1 year, 132 days
42	Frank Walker	Labor	14 May 1976	1 February 1983	6 years, 263 days
43	Paul Landa	Labor	1 February 1983	24 November 1984	1 year, 297 days
44	Neville Wran (acting)	Labor	27 November 1984	12 December 1984	15 days
45	Terry Sheahan	Labor	12 December 1984	26 November 1987	2 years, 349 days
46	Ron Mulock	Labor	26 November 1987	21 March 1988	116 days
47	John Dowd	Liberal	25 March 1988	6 June 1991	3 years, 73 days
48	Peter Collins	Liberal	6 June 1991	3 July 1992	1 year, 27 days
49	John Hannaford	Liberal	3 July 1992	4 April 1995	2 years, 275 days
50	Jeff Shaw	Labor	4 April 1995	28 June 2000	5 years, 85 days
51	Bob Debus	Labor	28 June 2000	2 April 2007	6 years, 278 days
52	John Hatzistergos	Labor	2 April 2007	28 March 2011	3 years, 360 days
53	Greg Smith	Liberal	3 April 2011	23 April 2014	3 years, 20 days
54	Brad Hazzard	Liberal	23 April 2014	2 April 2015	344 days
55	Gabrielle Upton	Liberal	2 April 2015	30 January 2017	1 year, 303 days
56	Mark Speakman SC	Liberal	30 January 2017	28 March 2023	6 years, 57 days
57	Michael Daley	Labor	28 March 2023	incumbent	3 years, 163 days

== See also ==
- List of New South Wales government agencies
