= Electoral district of Cumberland (North Riding) =

Former state electoral district of New South Wales, Australia

Cumberland (North Riding) was an electoral district of the Legislative Assembly in the Australian state of New South Wales from 1856 to 1859, in Cumberland County, which includes Sydney. It included all of the county north of Parramatta Road and the Great Western Highway, except for the urban electorates of Sydney (City), Sydney Hamlets, Parramatta and Cumberland Boroughs, which included Richmond and Windsor. It elected two members simultaneously, with voters casting two votes and the first two candidates being elected. It was abolished in 1859 and the district was divided between Central Cumberland, Windsor, Nepean and St Leonards.

== Members for Cumberland (North Riding) ==
Member	Party	Term	Member	Party	Term
John Darvall	None	1856–1857	James Pye	None	1856–1857
Thomas Smith	None	1857–1859	Henry Parkes	None	1858–1858
Thomas Smith	None	1857–1859	John Plunkett	None	1858–1859

== Election results ==
1858 Cumberland (North Riding) by-election Monday 13 September
Candidate	Votes	%
John Plunkett (elected)	unopposed	

The by-election was caused by the resignation of Henry Parkes due to financial difficulties with his newspaper The Empire.
