= William Montagu Manning =

Australian politician

Sir William Manning KCMG, QC
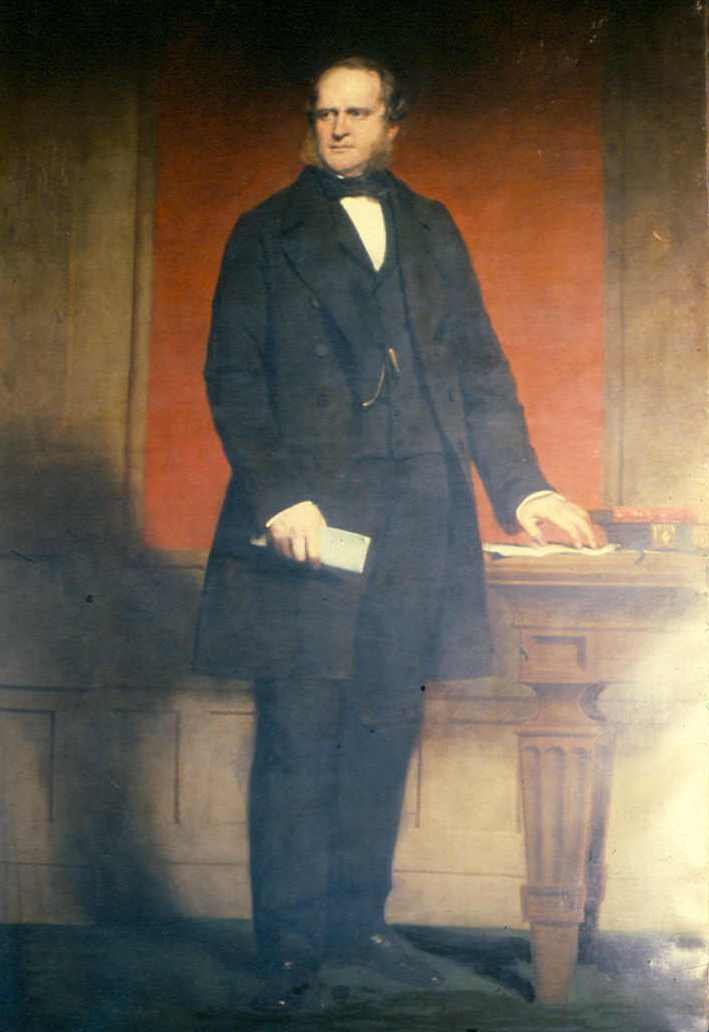
- 1895 portrait of Manning by Sir John Watson Gordon.

6th Attorney-General of New South Wales
- In office 6 June 1856 – 25 August 1856
- Preceded by: John Plunkett
- Succeeded by: James Martin
- In office 3 October 1856 – 25 May 1857
- Preceded by: James Martin
- Succeeded by: John Darvall
- In office 21 February 1860 – 8 March 1860
- Preceded by: Edward Wise
- Succeeded by: John Hargrave
- In office 21 October 1868 – 15 December 1870
- Preceded by: James Martin QC
- Succeeded by: Sir James Martin QC

4th Solicitor General for New South Wales
- In office 31 August 1844 – 11 January 1848
- Preceded by: William à Beckett
- Succeeded by: William Foster
- In office 20 November 1849 – 5 June 1856
- Preceded by: William Foster
- Succeeded by: John Darvall

5th Chancellor of the University of Sydney
- In office 1878 – 27 February 1895
- Preceded by: Edward Deas Thomson
- Succeeded by: William Windeyer

Personal details
- Born: William Montagu Manning; 20 June 1811 Alphington, near Exeter, United Kingdom
- Died: 27 February 1895 (aged 83) Sydney, New South Wales, Australia
- Resting place: St Jude's Church cemetery, Randwick
- Children: 2 sons; 4 daughters including Emily Matilda Manning
- Education: University College, London
- Occupation: Barrister; Politician

Sir William Montagu Manning KCMG, QC (20 June 1811 – 27 February 1895) was an English-born Australian politician, judge and University of Sydney chancellor.

== Early life ==
Manning was born in June 1811 at Alphington, near Exeter, Devon, the second son of John Edye Manning and Matilda Jorden (née Cooke). William Manning was educated in Tavistock, Southampton and University College, London. Manning then worked for an uncle, Serjeant Manning and was entered at Lincoln's Inn in November 1827. He was called to the bar in November 1832 and practised as a barrister on the Western Circuit. In collaboration with S. Neville, Manning prepared and published Reports of Cases Relating to the Duty and Offices of Magistrates (3 volumes, 1834-8), and was the author of Proceedings in Courts of Revision in the Isle of Wight (1836). On 16 August 1836 in Paris he married Emily Anne Wise (sister of Edward Wise).

== Career in Australia ==
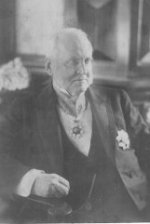
Photograph of Sir William Montagu Manning

In 1837 William and Emily Manning went to Australia on the City of Edinburgh, joining William's father who was registrar of the Supreme Court of New South Wales. Soon after his arrival in Sydney on 31 August 1837 was made a chairman of Quarter Sessions with a salary of £800. He took up his duties at Bathurst, New South Wales in October. In 1842 he was offered the position of resident judge at Port Phillip District, and in September 1844 became Solicitor General for New South Wales. In January 1848 he was appointed acting-judge of the Supreme Court of New South Wales during the absence of Mr Justice Therry. He resumed the position of Solicitor General at the end of 1849, and held this position until responsible government was established in 1856, when he retired with a pension of £800 a year. Manning was nominated to the New South Wales Legislative Council by Governor Fitzroy in October 1851, and assisted in the preparation of William Wentworth's constitution bill.

Manning was elected a member of the New South Wales Legislative Assembly in the first parliament, topping the poll for the South Riding of Cumberland. Manning was Attorney-General of New South Wales in the Stuart Donaldson ministry from 6 June to 25 August 1856. He was given the same position in the Henry Parker ministry in October 1856, but resigned on 25 May 1857 on account of ill-health. He was appointed a Queen's Counsel on 23 May 1857, the second NSW Barrister to be so appointed, and went to England. On 23 February 1858 Manning was knighted by the Queen Victoria.

On his return Manning was offered a temporary seat on the Supreme Court of New South Wales but declined it. On 21 February 1860 joined the William Forster ministry as attorney-general, but the ministry resigned about a fortnight later. In September 1861 he was appointed to the Legislative Council. He was again attorney-general in the John Robertson and Charles Cowper ministries from October 1868 to December 1870. In February 1875, though he was then a member of the upper house he was asked to form a ministry, but was unable to obtain sufficient support. Manning was appointed a Supreme court judge in 1876, requiring his resignation from the Legislative Council. He was primary judge in equity until his resignation in 1887. He voluntarily gave up his pension when he became a judge. On 8 February 1888 Manning was again nominated to the Legislative Council, and gave useful service there until near the end of his life.

== University of Sydney ==
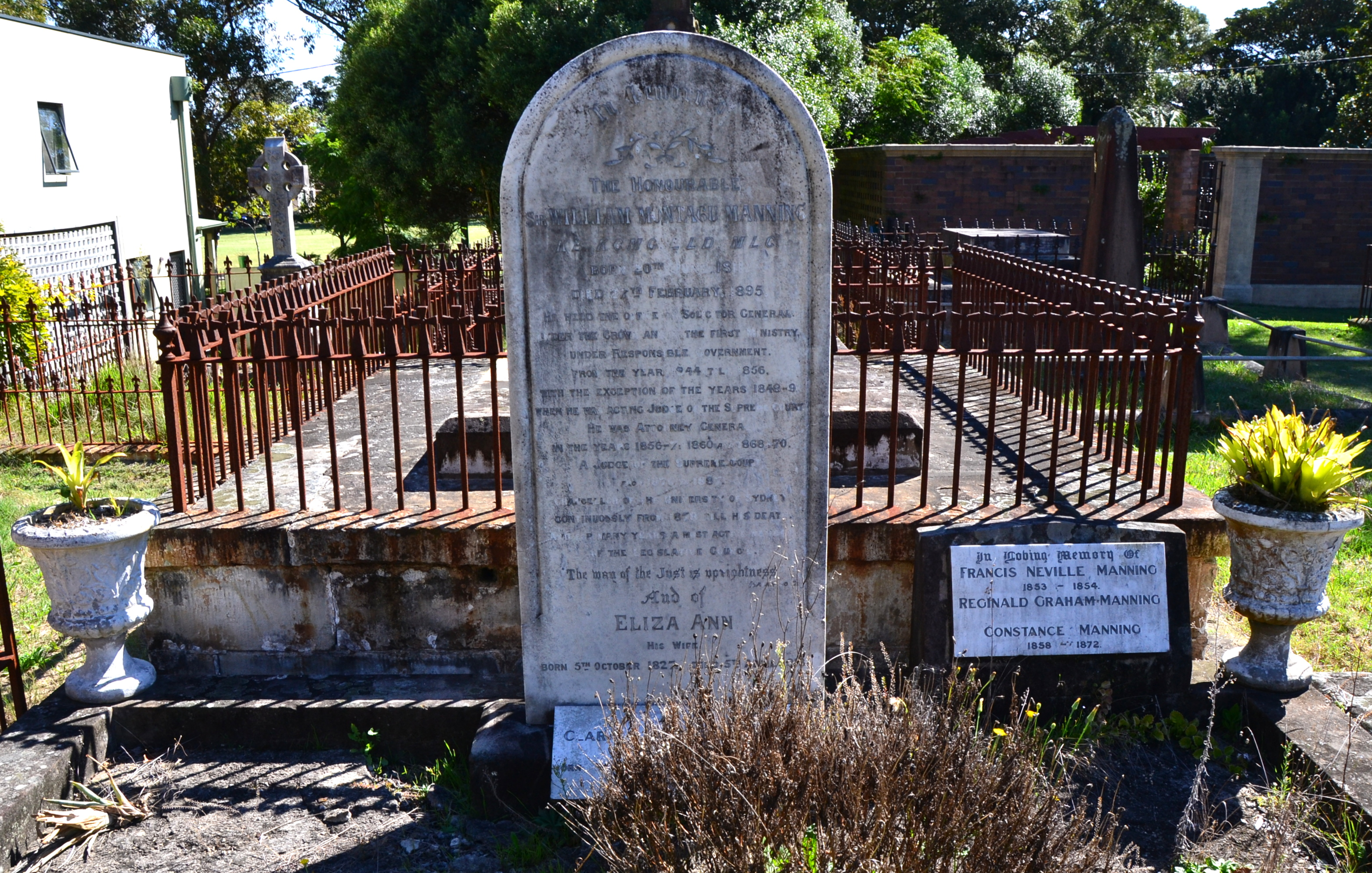
Manning's grave at St Jude's Church cemetery, Randwick

Manning had been elected a fellow of the senate of the University of Sydney in 1861, became chancellor in 1878 and held this position until his death on 27 February 1895 in Sydney.

Before Manning came into office the University had fewer than a hundred students in 1877, but during his chancellorship there was much expansion in the scope of the university and several new chairs were founded. He fought for and succeeded in getting increased grants from the government, stressed the need for more grammar schools to be created, and for the provision of university scholarships. He pleaded that women should have the same opportunities as men at the university and this was granted in 1881. Manning saved the university £15,000 by his discovery that the British taxation commissioners were charging succession duty on the John Henry Challis estate on too high a scale.

Manning's portrait by Sir John Watson Gordon, paid for by public subscription is in the MacLaurin Hall at Sydney University. He was knighted in 1858 and created K.C.M.G. in 1892. Manning married a second time to Eliza Anne, daughter of the Very Rev. William Sowerby on 7 June 1849. He was survived by a son and daughter from his first marriage; and his second wife and their son and three daughters. A daughter, Emily Matilda Manning (1845–1890), was a noted writer. Manning was buried in the cemetery of St Jude's Church, Randwick.

New South Wales Legislative Assembly
Preceded by New seat	Member for Cumberland (South Riding); 1856–1857; With: Elias Weekes / John Brenan / Stuart Donaldson	Succeeded by James Byrnes
Political offices
Preceded by William Foster	Solicitor General; 19 Nov 1849 – 5 Jun 1856	Succeeded by John Darvall
Preceded by John Plunkett	Attorney-General; 6 Jun – 25 Aug 1856	Succeeded by James Martin
Preceded by James Martin	Attorney-General; 3 Oct 1856 – 25 May 1857	Succeeded by John Darvall
Preceded by Edward Wise	Attorney-General; 21 Feb – 8 Mar 1860	Succeeded by John Hargrave
Preceded by James Martin QC	Attorney-General; 21 Oct 1868 – 15 Dec 1870	Succeeded by Sir James Martin QC
Academic offices
Preceded by Edward Deas Thomson	Chancellor of the University of Sydney; 1878–1895	Succeeded by William Charles Windeyer
