= Henry Parker (Australian politician) =

Australian politician

Sir Henry Parker KCMG
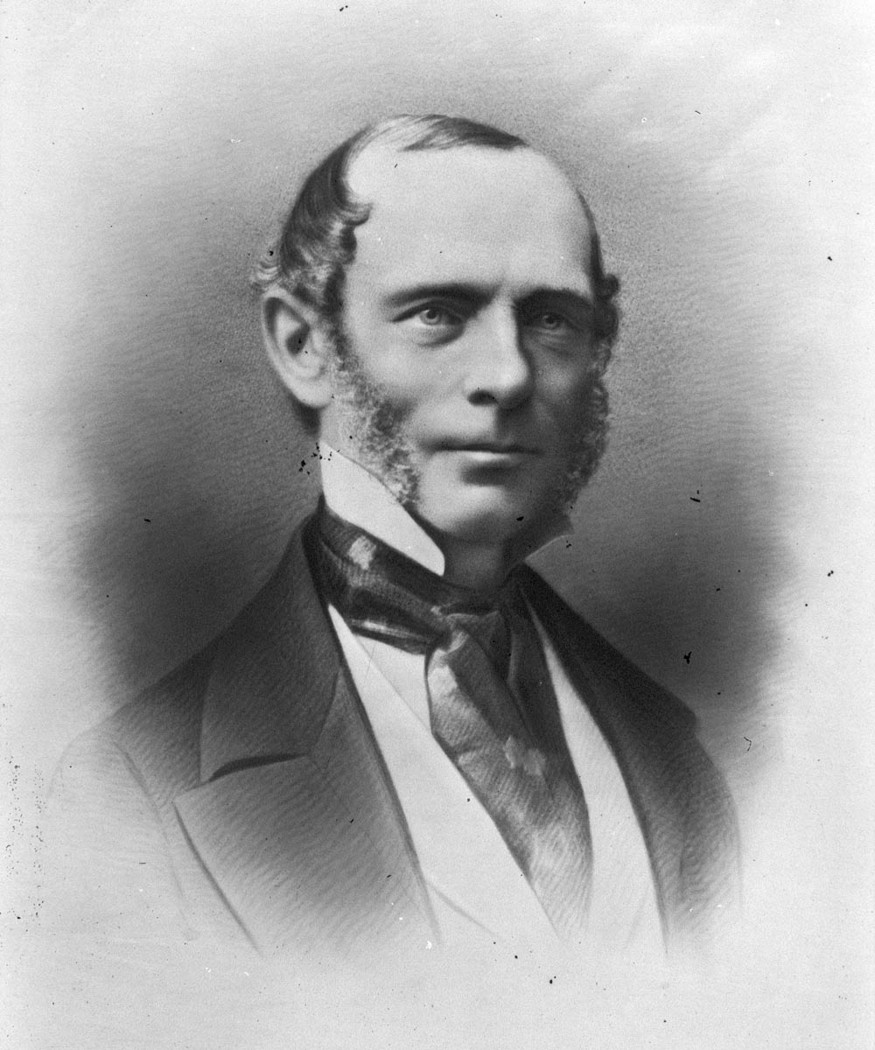

3rd Premier of New South Wales
- In office 3 October 1856 – 7 September 1857
- Monarch: Victoria
- Governor: Sir William Denison
- Preceded by: Charles Cowper
- Succeeded by: Charles Cowper

Personal details
- Born: Henry Watson Parker; 1 June 1808 Lewisham, Kent, England, UK
- Died: 2 February 1881 (aged 72) Richmond, Surrey, England, UK
- Spouse: Emmeline Emily Macarthur

Sir Henry Watson Parker, KCMG (1 June 1808 – 2 February 1881) was Premier of New South Wales. He fitted into colonial society and politics in the era before responsible government, but his style was not suited to the democratic politics that began to develop in 1856.

== Biography ==
Parker was the fourth son of Thomas Watson Parker and his wife Mary, née Cornell, of Lewisham, Kent, England. In order to improve his poor health, he joined the British East India Company and travelled to India, China and the Cape of Good Hope. Subsequently he toured France, Holland and Belgium, before securing employment in 1837 as private secretary to Sir George Gipps. In 1838 in this capacity he accompanied Gipps, now the incoming colonial Governor, to the Colony of New South Wales. In 1843 Parker married Emmeline Emily, third daughter of John Macarthur, which further linked him to the conservative colonial establishment.

In 1846 he was nominated by Gipps to become a member of the Legislative Council. In May he was elected Chairman of Committees (Deputy presiding officer of the upper house) at a salary of £250 (raised to £500 in 1853), and continued to be re-elected to this position until the introduction of responsible government in 1856.

Parker was elected as member for Parramatta in the first Legislative Assembly.

=== Premier ===
He left an estate of £140,000.

=== Recognition ===
Parker was knighted in 1858 and created Knight Commander of the Order of St Michael and St George in 1877.

Parker Street, the main shopping street of Cootamundra, was named for him.

There is also a Parker Street in Bega, named in an 1854 survey and running parallel to Gipps Street, but not attributed to Parker.

== See also ==
- Parker ministry

== Notes ==
Political offices
Preceded by Charles Cowper	Premier of New South Wales; 1856–1857	Succeeded by Charles Cowper
New South Wales Legislative Assembly
Preceded by New seat	Member for Parramatta; 1856–1857; Served alongside: Oakes	Succeeded by James Byrnes
