= John Darvall =

Australian politician (1809–1883)

Sir John Darvall KCMG, QC
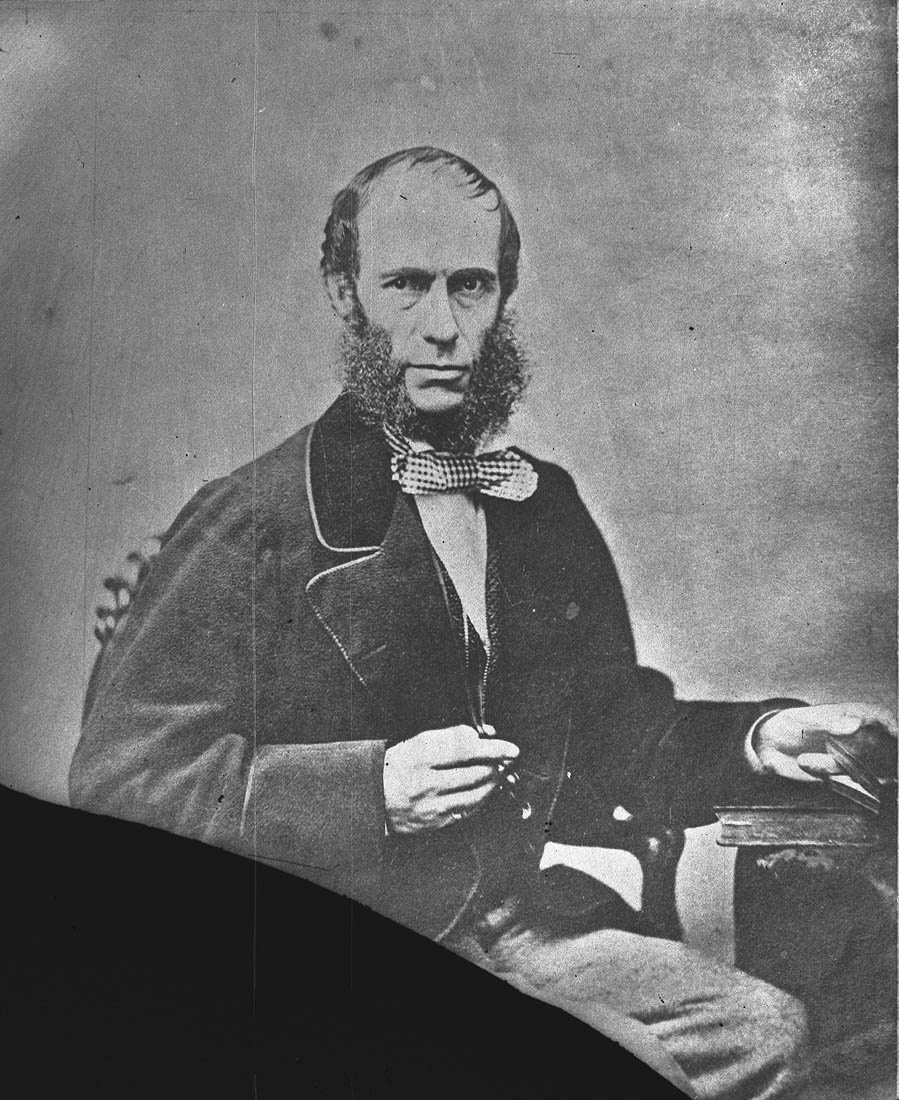

Solicitor General
- In office 6 June 1856 – 25 August 1856
- Preceded by: William Manning
- Succeeded by: Alfred Lutwyche
- In office 3 October 1856 – 23 May 1857
- Preceded by: Alfred Lutwyche
- Succeeded by: Edward Wise

8th Attorney General of New South Wales
- In office 26 May 1857 – 7 September 1857
- Preceded by: William Manning
- Succeeded by: James Martin QC
- In office 1 August 1863 – 15 October 1863
- Preceded by: John Hargrave
- Succeeded by: James Martin QC
- In office 3 February 1865 – 20 June 1865
- Preceded by: James Martin QC
- Succeeded by: John Plunkett QC

Personal details
- Born: John Bayley Darvall; 19 November 1809 Felixkirk, Yorkshire, England
- Died: 28 December 1883 (aged 74) London, England

Sir John Bayley Darvall KCMG, QC (19 November 1809 – 28 December 1883) was an Australian barrister and politician. He was a member of the New South Wales Legislative Council between 1844 and 1856 and again between 1861 and 1863. He was also a member of the New South Wales Legislative Assembly for three periods between 1856 and 1865. He held the positions of Solicitor General and Attorney General in a number of short-lived colonial governments.

== Early life ==
Darvall was born into an upper-middle-class Yorkshire family and was educated at Eton and Trinity College, Cambridge. Subsequently, he was articled to his uncle, Sir John Bayley at the Middle Temple and was called to the English Bar in 1838. He was an awardee as a trustee to secure an annuity for his step-grandmother, Mary Johnson, of a compensation claim made for 264 slaves totalling £3,461.

He emigrated to Sydney in 1839 and established a large, private legal practice. Darvall accrued significant agricultural and pastoral interests and was a director of several colonial companies, a number of which failed in the depression of the early 1840s. He declined a judgeship in Victoria in 1851 and was appointed as a Queen's Counsel in 1857, a CMG in 1869 and a KCMG in 1877. Darvall returned to England in 1865 and continued in legal practice. He was a great-uncle of Banjo Paterson and related through his sister Emily Mary Barton.

== Parliament ==
On 24 July 1844, prior to the establishment of responsible self-government, Darvall was appointed to the New South Wales Legislative Council. He was a loyal supporter of the government until, unable to support the continuing nomination of members, he resigned in 1848. He was then elected to the Council, initially for the seat of County of Bathurst and between 1851 and 1856 as the member for County of Cumberland. Darvall styled himself as a "Patrician Liberal" and was a supporter of John Dunmore Lang and Charles Cowper. He opposed the 1853 Constitution Bill of William Charles Wentworth because of its provision for an hereditary upper house.

Following the granting of self-government, Darvall was elected to the first Legislative Assembly as one of the two members for the seat of Cumberland (North Riding). He was surprisingly appointed as the Solicitor General in the conservative and short-lived government of Stuart Donaldson. He was also Solicitor General 6 June to 25 August 1856 and 3 October 1856 to 23 May 1857 then Attorney-General 26 May to 7 September 1857 in the government of Henry Parker. Darvall became concerned by the effects of manhood suffrage and the colony's liberal land distribution schemes and resigned from the Assembly in November 1857. He subsequently joined the conservative Constitutional Association and was elected in their interest for the seat of Hawkesbury at the 1859 election. His opposition to the Free Selection of Crown Lands led to significant dissension in the electorate and he did not contest the 1860 election.

While opposed to parliamentary nominations, he nevertheless accepted a nomination to the Legislative Council in 1861. He used his period in the Council to press for its conversion into an elected house and for a limitation on its powers over money bills. However, at the same time, he also expressed concerns at the excesses of colonial democracy. He resigned from the Council in June 1863 to successfully contest a by-election for the seat of East Maitland and on re-entering the assembly he almost immediately accepted the position of Attorney-General in the liberal government of Charles Cowper. Cowper's government fell in October of that year and at the subsequent election he was elected as one of the four members for West Sydney. He was again made Attorney-General on 3 February 1865 by Cowper but resigned on 20 June 1865 to return to England.

New South Wales Legislative Council
Preceded by Hastings Elwin	Appointed Member; 24 Jul 1844 – 20 Jun 1848	Succeeded by Edward Hamilton
Preceded by Francis Lord	Member for County of Bathurst; Jul 1848 – Jun 1851	Succeeded by James William Bligh
Preceded by James Byrnes	Member for County of Cumberland; Sep 1851 – Feb 1856; With: Robert Fitzgerald	Original Council abolished
New South Wales Legislative Assembly
Preceded by First Election	Member for Cumberland (North Riding); 4 Apr 1856 – 26 Nov 1857; With: James Pye	Succeeded by Thomas Smith
Preceded by New Seat	Member for Hawkesbury; 25 Jun 1859 – 10 Nov 1860; With: William Piddington	Succeeded by James Cunneen
Preceded by James Dickson	Member for East Maitland; 18 Jun 1863 – 10 Nov 1864	Succeeded by Alexander Dodds
Preceded by Geoffrey Eagar	Member for West Sydney; 24 Nov 1864 – 22 Jun 1865; With: John Lang; John Robertson; Samuel Joseph	Succeeded by Geoffrey Eagar
Political offices
Preceded by William Manning as non-parliamentary appointment	Solicitor General; 6 Jun 1856 – 25 Aug 1856	Succeeded by Alfred Lutwyche
Preceded by Alfred Lutwyche	Solicitor General; 3 Oct 1856 – 23 May 1857	Succeeded by Edward Wise
Preceded by William Manning	Attorney-General; 26 May – 7 Sep 1857	Succeeded by James Martin QC
Preceded by John Hargrave	Attorney-General; 1 Aug – 15 Oct 1863	Succeeded by James Martin QC
Preceded by James Martin QC	Attorney-General; 3 Feb – 20 Jun 1865	Succeeded by John Plunkett QC
