= Edward Wise (judge) =

Australian politician

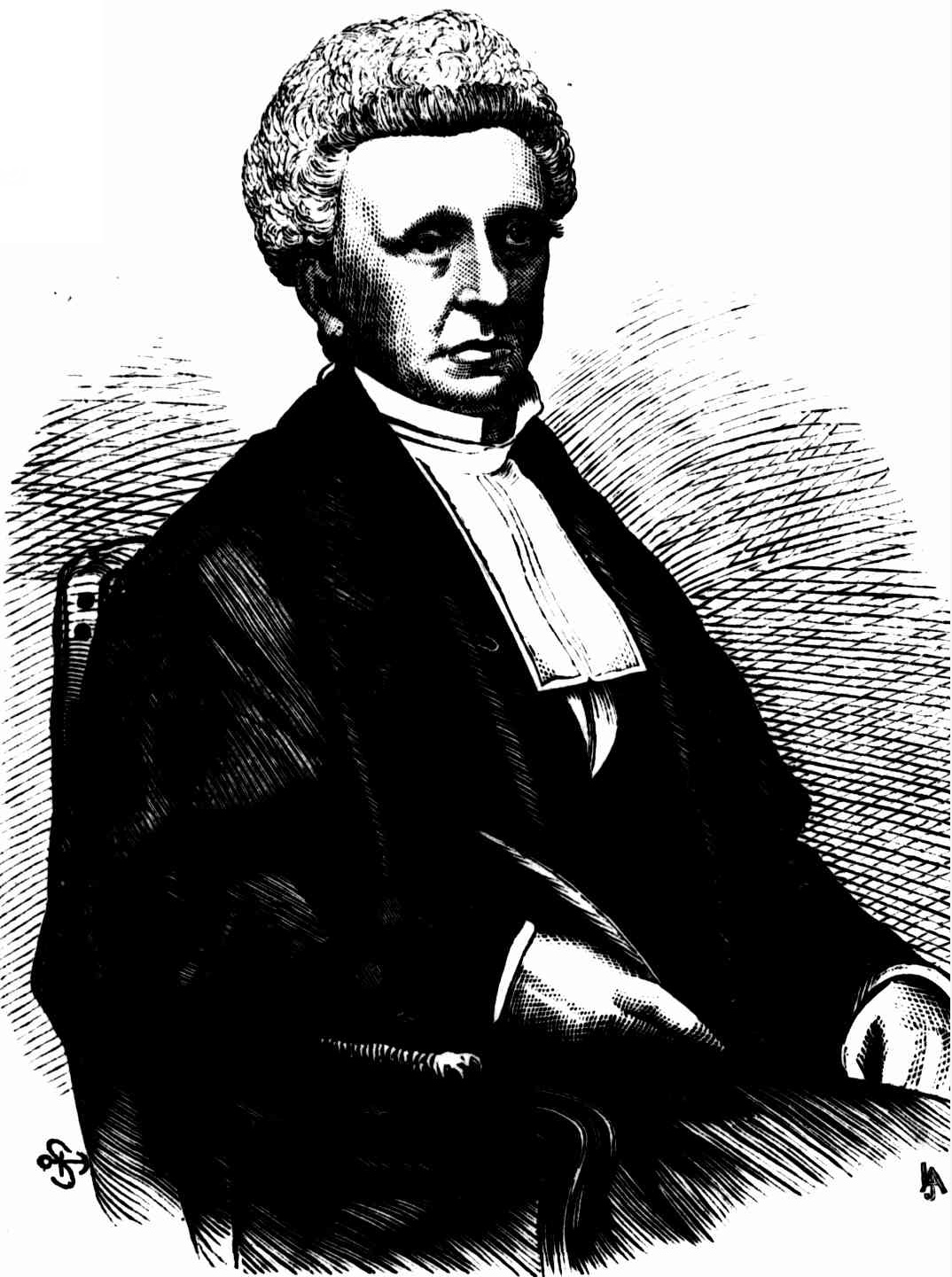
Mr Justice Wise

Edward Wise (13 August 1818 – 28 September 1865) was a judge of the Supreme Court of New South Wales.

Wise's sister, Emily Anne, married William Montagu Manning.
