= Gerard Krefft =

Australian zoologist, palaeontologist, and museum curator (1830–1881)

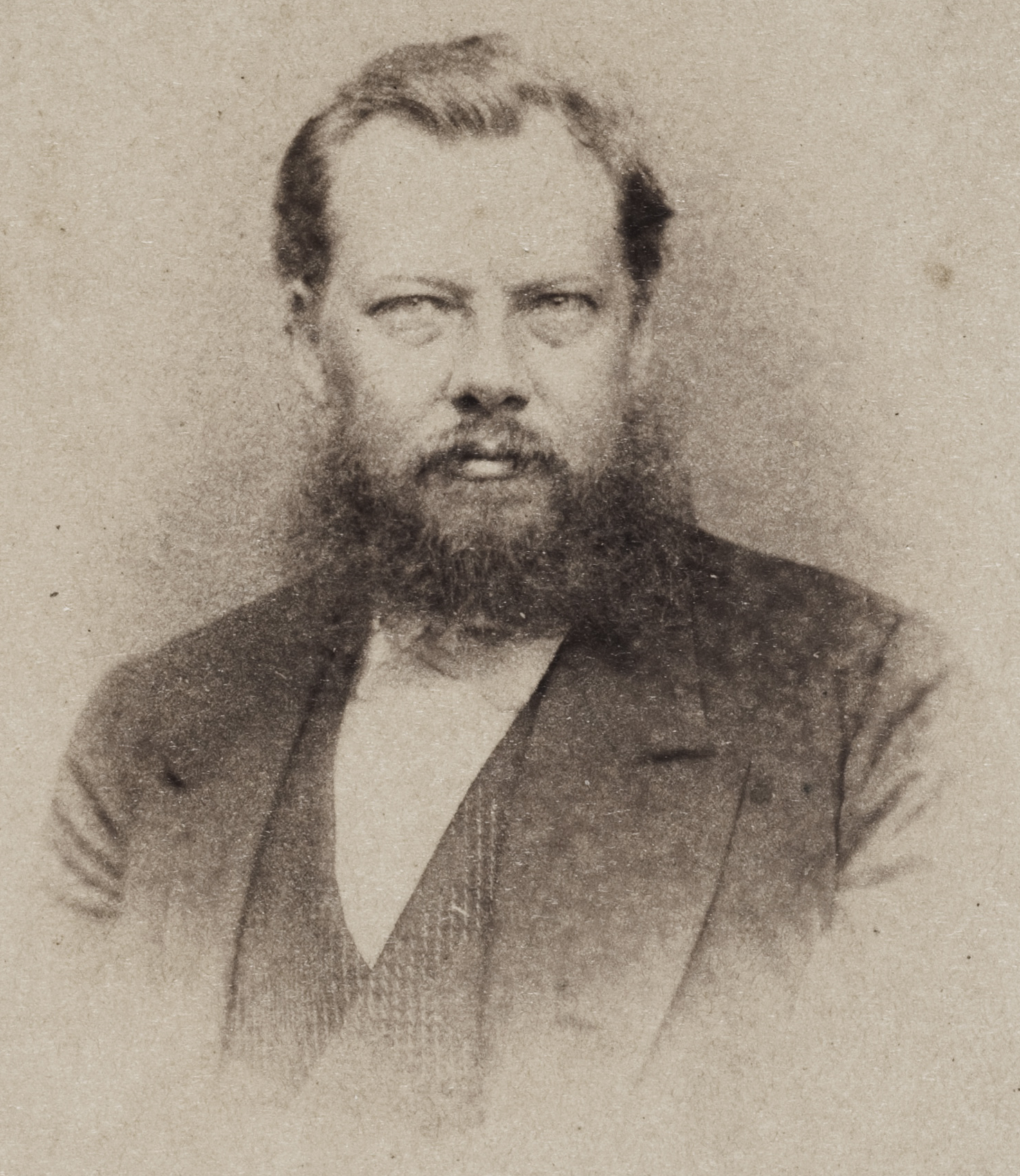
- Gerard Krefft, 1869–1870
- Born: 17 February 1830; Duchy of Brunswick
- Died: 18 February 1881 (aged 51); Woolloomooloo, New South Wales
- Resting place: St Jude's Church, Randwick
- Education: St Martin's College, Braunschweig
- Known for: Discovery, identification, and naming of the Queensland lungfish
- Spouse: Annie McPhail (m.1869)
- Children: 4
- Relatives: Gerhard Krefft (great-nephew)
- Awards: Order of the Crown of Italy
- Scientific career
- Fields: natural history, zoology, palaeontology, ichthyology, entomology, herpetology
- Workplaces: National Museum of Victoria; Australian Museum
- Author abbrev. (zoology): Krefft

Johann Ludwig (Louis) Gerard Krefft (17 February 1830 – 18 February 1881), was an Australian artist, draughtsman, scientist, and natural historian who served as the curator of the Australian Museum for 13 years (1861–1874). He was one of Australia's first and most influential palaeontologists and zoologists, "some of [whose] observations on animals have not been surpassed and can no longer be equalled because of the spread of settlement (Rutledge & Whitley, 1974).

He is also noted as an ichthyologist for his scientific description of the Queensland lungfish (now recognized as a classic example of Darwin's "living fossils"); and, in addition to his numerous scientific papers and his extensive series of weekly newspaper articles on natural history, his publications include The Snakes of Australia (1869), Guide to the Australian Fossil Remains in the Australian Museum (1870f), The Mammals of Australia (1871f), On Australian Entozoa (1872a), and Catalogue of the Minerals and Rocks in the Australian Museum (1873a).

Krefft was one of the very few Australian scientists in the 1860s and 1870s to support Darwin's position on the origin of species by means of natural selection. According to Macdonald, et al. (2007), he was one of the first to warn of the devastating effects of the invasive species (sheep, cats, etc.) on native species. Also, along with several significant others — such as Charles Darwin, during his 1836 visit to the Blue Mountains, Edward Wilson, the proprietor of the Melbourne Argus, and George Bennett, one of the trustees of the Australian Museum — Krefft expressed considerable concern in relation to the effects of the expanding European settlement upon the indigenous population.

== Family ==
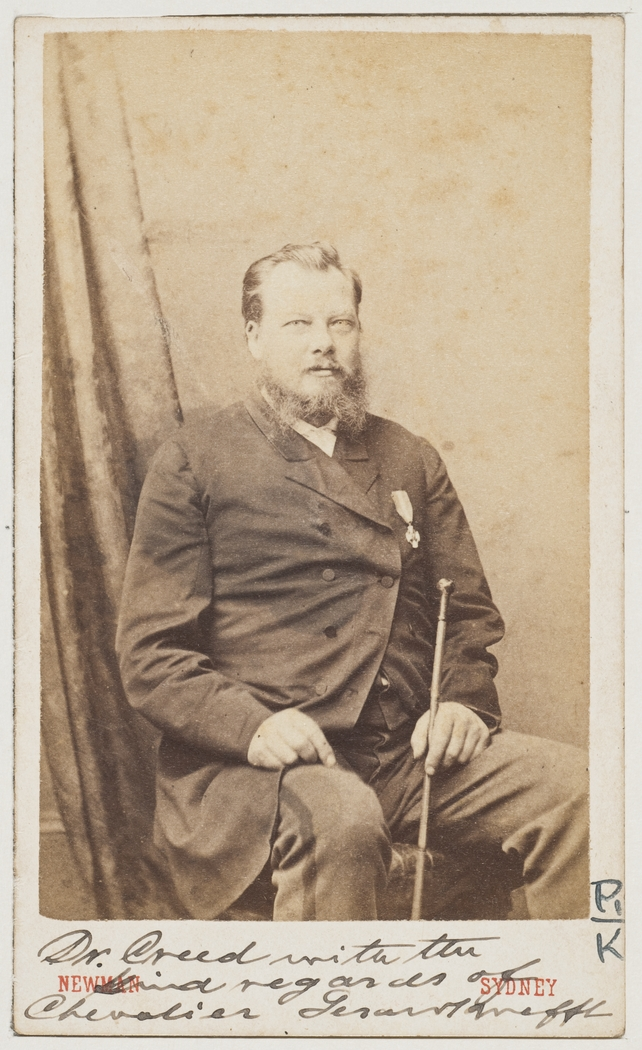
Gerard Krefft (1869) with his Cross of the Order of the Crown of Italy.

Krefft was born on 17 February 1830 in the Duchy of Brunswick (now part of Germany), the son of William Krefft, a confectioner, and his wife Johanna (née Bischhoff).

=== Education ===
He was educated at St Martin's College in Braunschweig (i.e., Martino-Katharineum) from 1834 to 1845. As a youth, he was interested in art, especially painting animals, and wanted to go on to a formal study of painting; however his family found employment for him at a mercantile firm in Halberstadt.

=== Marriage ===
He married Annie McPhail, later (1893) Mrs. Robert Macintosh, on 6 February 1869. According to Nancarrow (2007, p. 5), Annie McPhail was the Australian-born daughter of Scottish bounty immigrants, who had arrived in Australia in 1837 to work for George Bowman, and she was five months pregnant at the time of her marriage to Krefft.

They had four children, only two of whom survived their infancy: Rudolph Gerard Krefft (1869–1951), and Herman Gerard Krefft (1879–1911). A fifth child, an unnamed stillborn daughter, was delivered on 2 July 1874.

=== German heritage ===
As a German speaker, Krefft belonged to the largest non-English-speaking group in Australia in the 1800s; and, as such, Krefft was one of a number of influential German-speaking scientists who, according to Barrett, et al. (2018, p. 2) brought their "epistemic traditions" to Australia, and not only became "deeply entangled with the Australian colonial project", but also were "intricately involved in imagining, knowing and shaping colonial Australia".

Moreover, in relation to Krefft (the scientist), and his wider disciplinary allegiances, and his limited deference to the supposed authority of the established British scientific elite, unlike the Anglo-Australian trustees of the Australian Museum and "like many [of the German] scientists working in Australia, England was never "home" for Krefft as it was for the majority of colonists" and, typically, England did not "provid[e] the sole intellectual influence for [Krefft's] investigations" (Davidson, 2017, p. 81).

== "Natural history" ==
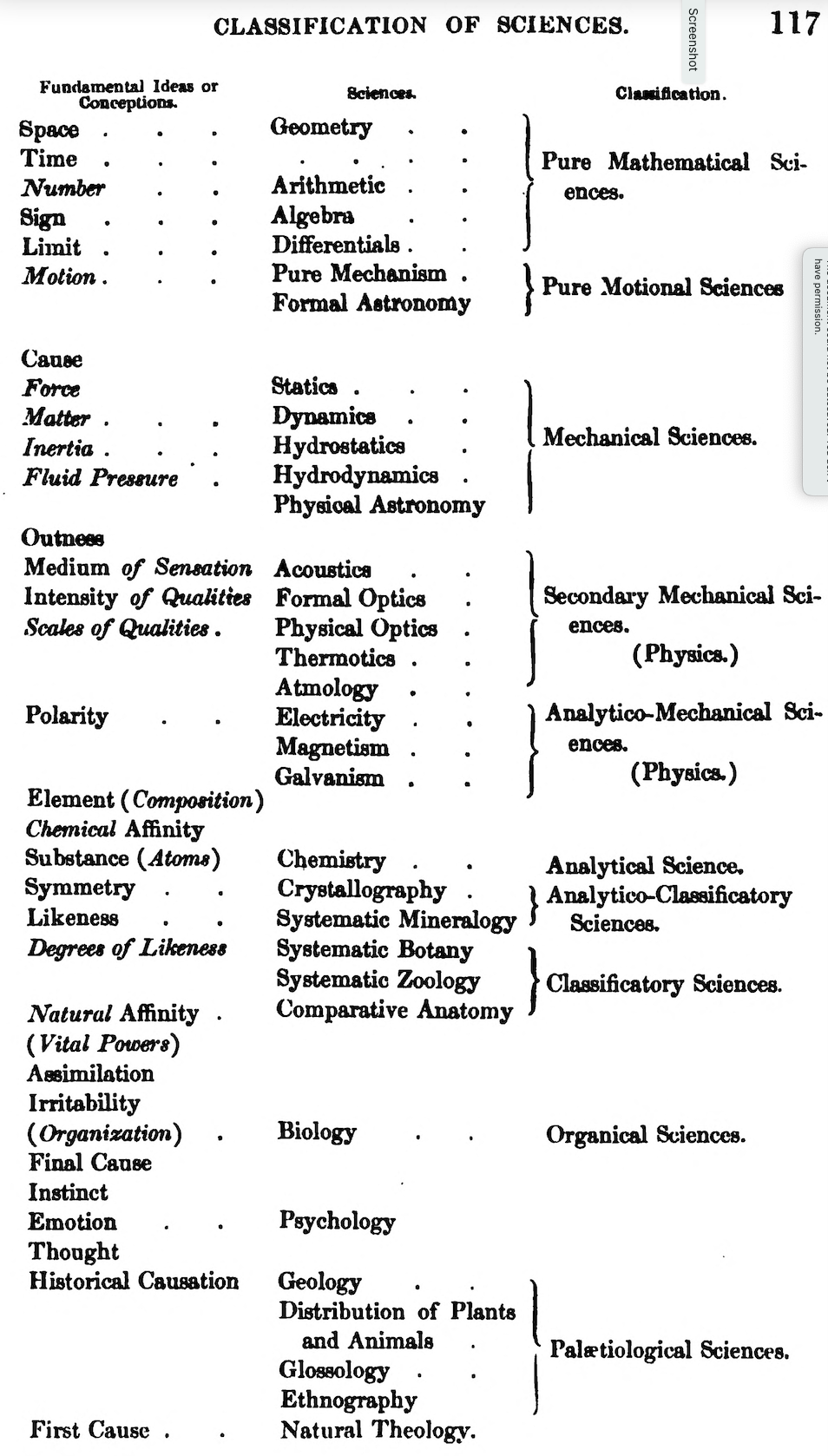
The "palætiological sciences" located within Whewell's (1847) Classification of Sciences.

Given Vallance's tripartite division (1978) of nineteenth century Australian science — i.e., the proto-scientific period (1788–1839), the pioneer-scientific period (1840–1874), and the classic science period (1875-) — Krefft's influential Australian career was firmly centred in the pioneer-scientific period. Consequently, and in order to avoid the prochronistic mistake of viewing the past through the eyes of the present, and given,

- that the Australian Museum (established in 1827) is the fifth oldest museum of natural history in the world,
- the need to identify the Australian Museum's orientation during Krefft's tenure,
- the need to identify Krefft's particular domains of interest (and influence) as a scientist,
- the on-going significance of Krefft's (more than 180) "Natural History" articles published in the Sydney Mail from March 1871 to June 1875, and
- that 19th. century natural history was concerned with the study of nature; and, from this, it was directly involved with the evidence obtained from the direct observation of nature (however ambiguously "nature" might be described),
- that, in 1822 (pp. iii-iv) Friedrich Mohs drew attention to the inappropriateness of the label natural history, on the grounds that it "does not express the essential properties of the science to which it is applied", and
- that, in 1837, prompted by Mohs' remarks, William Whewell, the mineralogist, scholar and, later, Master of Trinity College, Cambridge (from 1841 to 1866), who, in his time, was "recognized as the leading authority on new [terminological] coinages" — as part of his ground-breaking work in relation to the issues of terminology and classification within the sciences, and extending the meaning of the (recently introduced) English term palæontology — suggested the alternative notion of "palætiological sciences" to denote "those researches in which the object is, to ascend from the present state of things to a more ancient condition, from which the present is derived by intelligible causes" (Whewell, 1837, p. 481).

it is important to note that the widely used "umbrella" terms of natural history and natural historian (or naturalist) were generally understood (and variously applied) in the mid-1800s to identify the collective endeavours of an extremely wide range of diverse enterprises that are, now, separately identified as, at least, the disciplines of anthropology, astronomy, biology, botany, ecology, entomology, ethnology, geology, herpetology, ichthyology, mammalogy, mineralogy, mycology, ornithology, palaeontology, and zoology.

== "Darwinian doctrine" and the consequent "Darwinian controversy" ==
In a landmark book entitled On the Origin of Species by Means of Natural Selection, Darwin argued against the conventional notion that God had supernaturally created the original types of plants and animals [viz., 'the immutability of species'] and in favor of the idea that they had evolved naturally over long periods of time primarily, though not exclusively, by means of random variation and natural selection.—Numbers & Stenhouse (1999), p. 1.

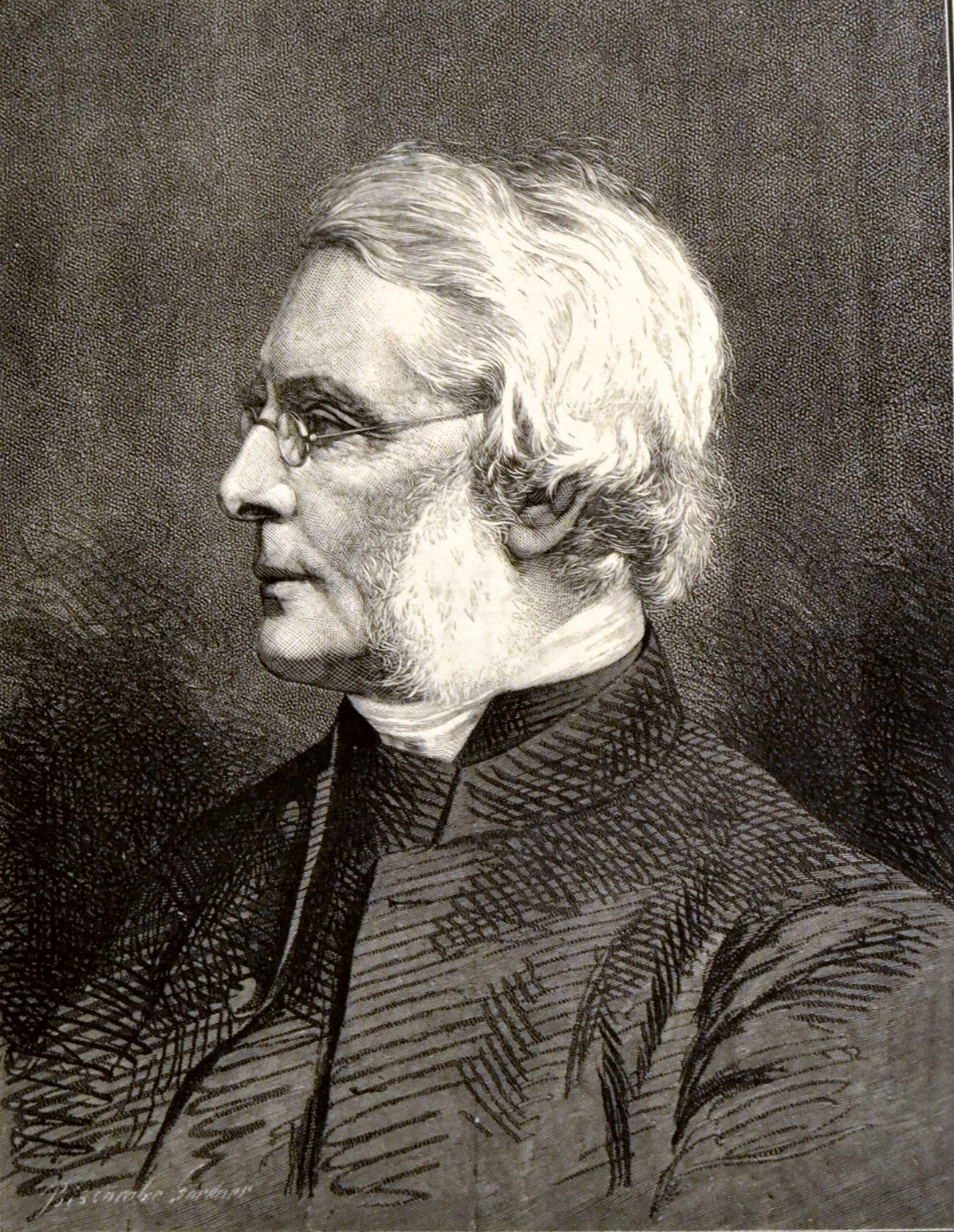
Rev. John William Colenso, DD, Bishop of Natal (1875).

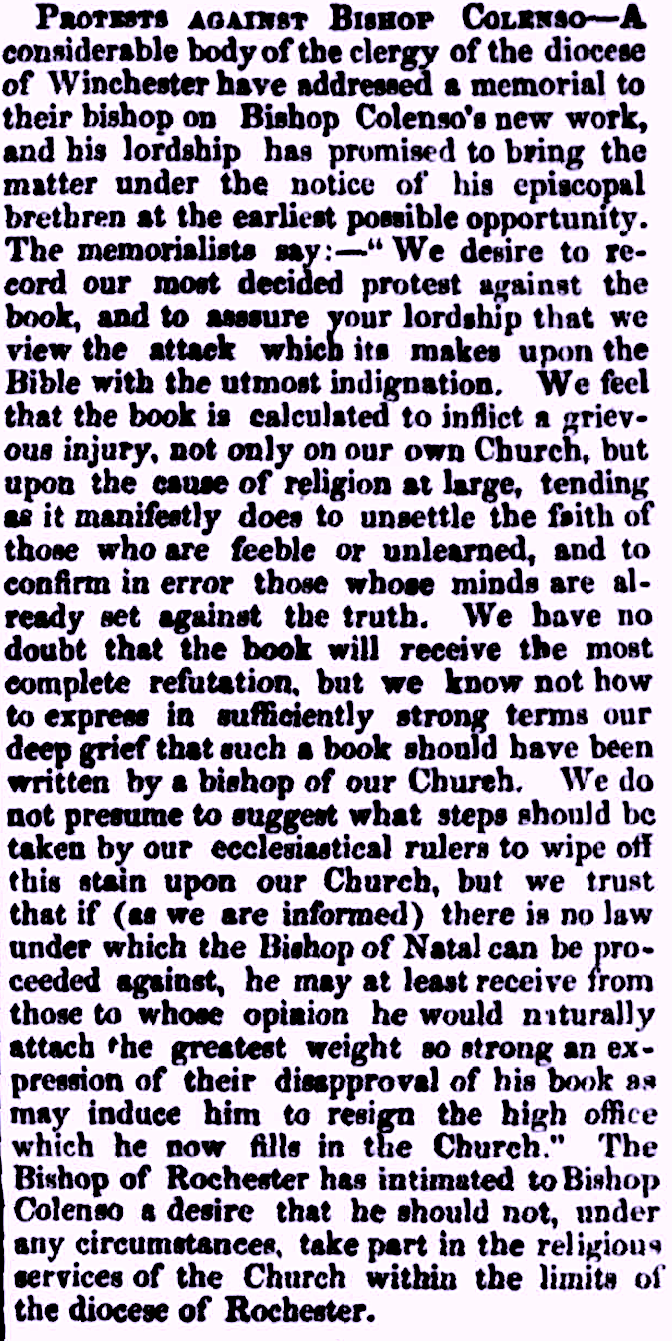
Anglican Clerics' protests — from The Times, 18 December 1862.

Krefft's professional career, his museum curatorship, his interactions with the Anglo-Australian trustees of the Australian Museum, and his professional endeavours to disseminate the latest scientific understandings to the people of New South Wales in the mid-1800s coincided with an entirely new awareness of the world, derived from the abundance of ongoing scientific advances, technological innovations, geological discoveries, and colonial explorations, and the emerging rational skepticism, expressed by Bishop John Colenso (Colenso, 1862, 1865, 1971, 1873, 1879) and others, about the objective veracity of specific Christian scriptures (e.g., Noah's Ark, the Deluge, the Crossing of the Red Sea, the Exodus, etc.), along with the concomitant challenges to the heretofore accepted theology, tenets of faith, and established religious practices.

The controversy over Colenso's challenges to Biblical authority, accepted authorship, and historical accuracy continued in Australia; e.g., on 7 July 1873, the Melbourne-based Jesuit, Joseph O'Malley, author of Noah's Ark Vindicated and Explained: A Reply to Dr. Colenso's Difficulties (1871) (which included O'Malley's "Imaginary Plan of the [1080 stalls in the] Ark"), visited Sydney and lectured on "Noah's Ark", delivering the standard Roman Catholic position on Noah's Ark and the Deluge, and attempting to explain away many of Colenso's challenges. The lecture, chaired by the devout Irish Catholic layman Justice Peter Faucett, Puisne Judge of the Supreme Court of New South Wales — who would later (in 1875) express the judicial opinion that Krefft's dismissal from his Museum curatorship was justified — was well attended.

=== Evolution ===
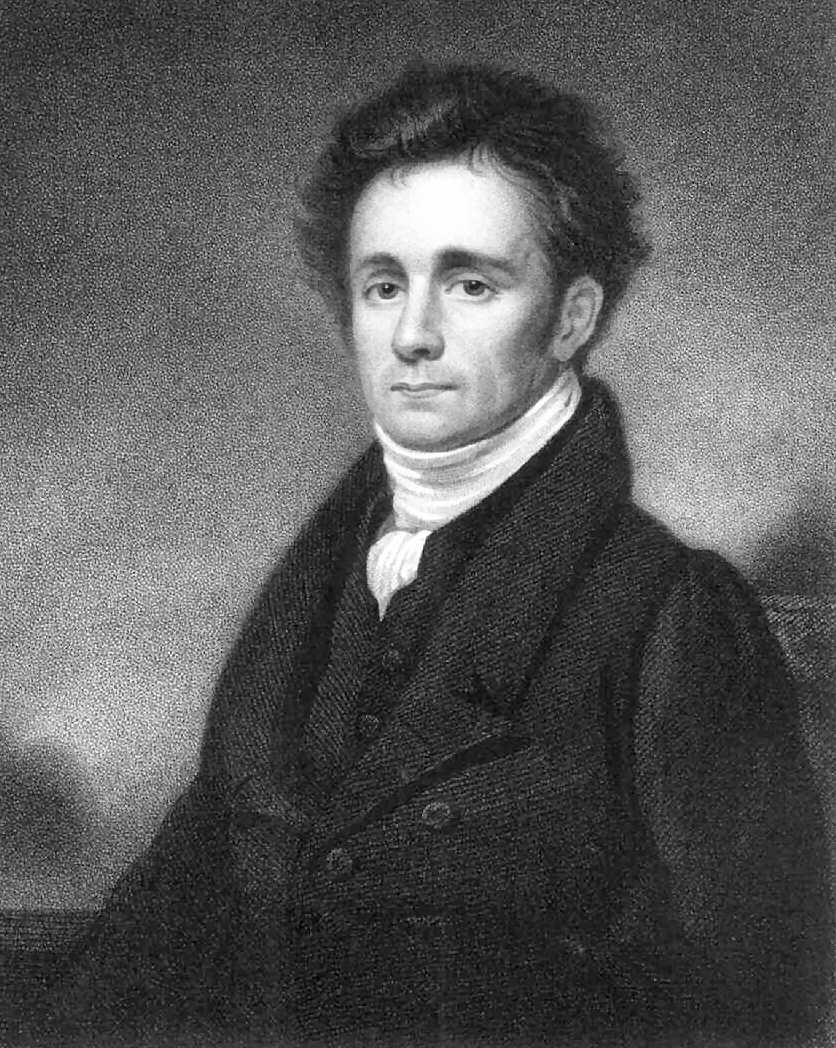
Prof. Robert Jameson (c.1847).

Darwin was not the first to speak of "evolution"; and it is important to note that Darwin, himself, did not use the term "evolution" until the sixth (1872) edition of his Origin (in its first five editions Darwin spoke of "descent through modification"). Robert Chambers, in his popular works, Vestiges of the Natural History of Creation (1844/1884) and Explanations (1845), had already made the notion of "evolution" a matter of public discussion. Also, there were the two earlier (anonymous) articles — recently attributed (see: Tanghe & Kestemont, 2018) to Robert Jameson, the Regius Professor of Natural History at the University of Edinburgh and, also, the Journal's editor — "Observations on the Nature and Importance of Geology" (Anon, 1826; esp. pp. 297–299) and "Of the Changes which Life has experienced on the Globe" (Anon, 1827), that had been published in the Edinburgh New Philosophical Journal at the time that Darwin was studying medicine at Edinburgh University. Jameson's articles were even more influential in the case of Darwin, given the fact that during the 1826/1827 academic year, Darwin had, as an extracurricular study, "assiduously" attended Jameson's popular natural history lectures at Edinburgh University, which involved "lectures five days a week for five months" (Secord, 1991, pp. 134–135), at least one of which was entitled "On the Origins of the Animal Species" (Tanghe & Kestemont, 2018, p. 586).

=== Natural selection ===
Fertilized by his [1839] Beagle journal from his four years as a travelling naturalist and his subsequent experiments and research, The Origin was stocked with new biological data drawn from sources across the globe, its wide compass offering a detailed proposal for the progressive development of species and a positivist biological framework for man's understanding of the natural world.—Moyal & Marks, 2019, p. 5.

In a paper read to the Linnean Society of London on 1 July 1858 — written separately from, but presented jointly with, that of Alfred Russel Wallace (i.e., Darwin & Wallace, 1858) — that was firmly based upon the foundations of the extensive and varied evidence provided by his comprehensive in-the-field observations over two decades, Darwin was the first to propose "natural selection" (as opposed to the "artificial selection" of livestock- or plant-breeders) — thereby "[substituting] a natural for a supernatural explanation of the material organic universe" (Abbott, 1912, p. 18) — as the process responsible for the diversity of life on Earth.

Along with the Sydney botanist, Robert D. FitzGerald, and the Melbourne economist, Professor William Edward Hearn, Krefft was one of the very few Australian scientists in the 1860s and 1870s who supported Darwin's position on the origin of species by means of natural selection.

=== Ellegård's five "positions" held by scientists in the Darwinian controversy ===
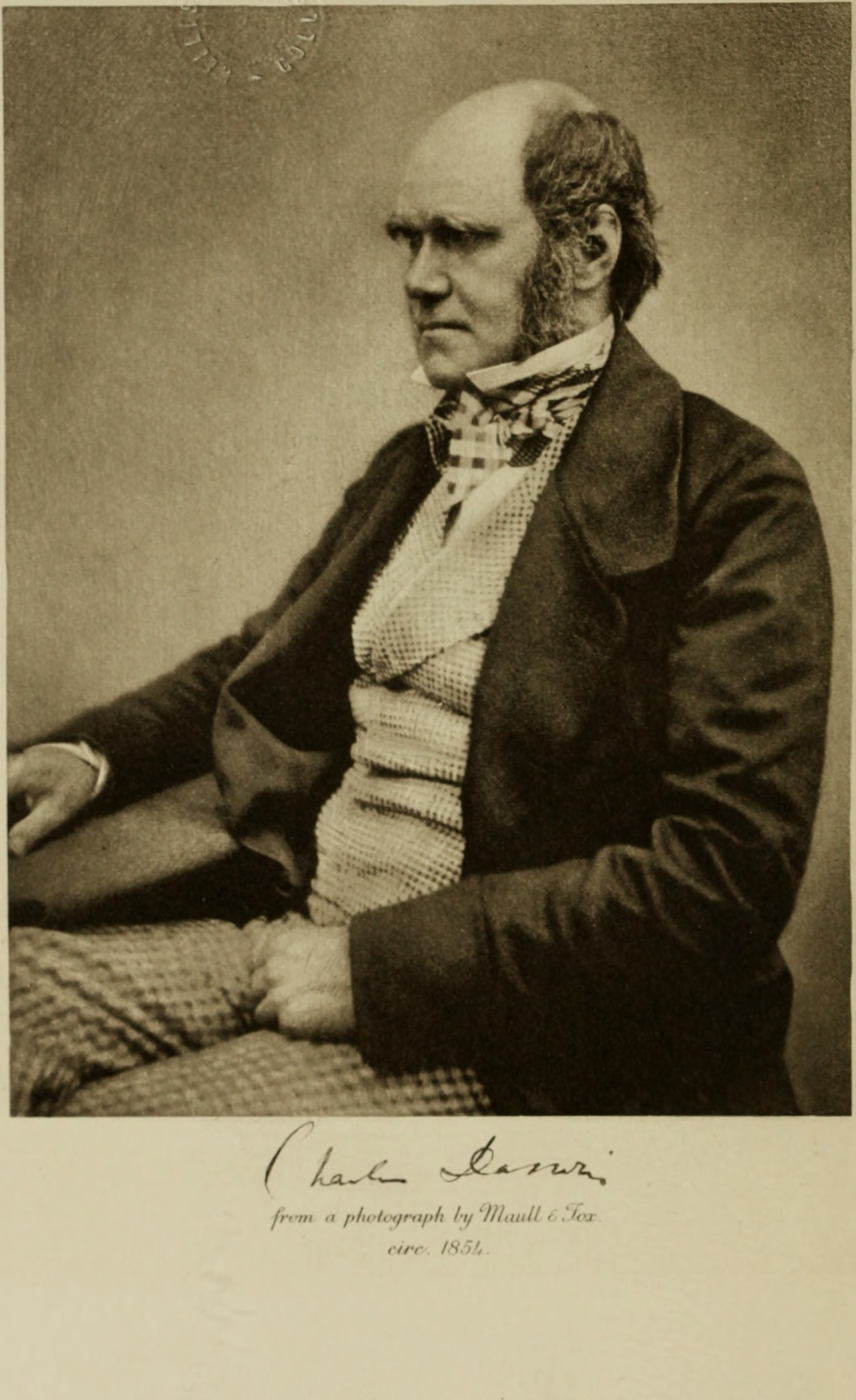
Charles Darwin (c.1854).

What appears so remarkable to [those in] a later age is that in the mid-nineteenth century scientists could look upon a supernatural explanation as a valid alternative to a scientific one.—Ellegård (1990), p. 15.
The law of succession [as demonstrated by The Wellington Caves' Diprotodon fossils], once firmly established, provided a powerful argument in favour of evolution. If one adopts the theory that new species develop from preexisting ones by a process of descent with modification, then it is absolutely necessary that there be a continuity between existing species and recently extinct species. Moreover, the opposing theories of the anti-evolutionists failed to explain this continuity.—Dugan (1980), p. 270.

Alvar Ellegård's extensive (1958) survey of the coverage of the "Darwinian doctrine" in the U.K. press between 1859 and 1872 distinguished three aspects — "first, the Evolution idea in its general application to the whole of the organic world; second, the Natural Selection theory; and third, [the] theory of Man's descent from the lower animals" (Ellegård, 1990, p. 24) — and identified five ideological "positions" taken (or ideological "attitudes" displayed) by individual participants over that decade and a half, which were determined, to a considerable extent, not only by their levels of education, but also by their particular politico-social, philosophical, and/or religious orientation.

These five positions (collectively) reflected a simple series, which "indicate[d] an increasing degree of favourableness towards Darwin's theory, from total rejection to complete acceptance" (p. 30); and, as one moved from lower (A) to higher (E) along Ellegård's series, "less and less of the processes going into the formation of species were recognized [by those holding that position] as supernatural, or outside the range of ordinary scientific explanation ... [and, therefore] anybody accepting a position with a higher [level] accepted ipso facto all the scientific explanation already granted by those holding a lower position" (p. 31):

- (A): Absolute Creation (p. 30): "the fundamentalist religious position, according to which each species arose as a distinct and instantaneous creation, in the literal and naïve sense of the word";
- (B): Progressive Creation (p. 30): "where species developed mysteriously from the simplest organic form";
- (C): Derivation (p. 30): "which recognised the principle of descent in progressive evolution but allowed that this mechanism was only one of the secondary processes which the Creator employed";
- (D): Directed Selection (p. 31): "which admitted the efficacy of Natural Selection for a considerable number of specific differentiations, but relied on a teleological explanation as an indispensable part of the explanation of the organic world"; and
- (E): Natural Selection (p. 31): "the scientific, non-teleological, non-supernatural explanation of the evolution of the whole organic world".

According to Ellegård's survey (p. 32), until 1863, the majority of British scientists belonged to either (A) or (B); but, by 1873, the majority had moved to either (C) or (D), with a small number of them going on to position (E).

However, things were considerably different in Australia. Setting aside disciplinary "outliers" such as FitzGerald, Hearn, and Krefft (each of whom held position (E)) — and ignoring the (peripheral) fact that Charles Darwin was elected as an honorary member of the Royal Society of New South Wales in 1879, and that pro-Darwinians, the natural historian, Thomas Huxley, and the botanist, Sir Joseph Dalton Hooker, were awarded the Society's prestigious Clarke Medal in 1880 and 1885 respectively — it was not really until the late 1890s, due to the influence of the academic appointments of William Aitcheson Haswell to the University of Sydney, Baldwin Spencer to the University of Melbourne, Ralph Tate to the University of Adelaide, and James Thomas Wilson to the University of Sydney, etc., and the administrative/curatorial appointments of Robert Etheridge to the Australian Museum in Sydney, Baldwin Spencer to the National Museum of Victoria in Melbourne, and Herbert Scott to the Queen Victoria Museum in Launceston, etc., that the majority of Australian scientists began to move away from (A) or (B), and that "the contributions of Darwin and his successors [could begin to] seriously affect Australian thinking and bring it into the mainstream of scientific thought" (Mozley, p. 430).

== Artist ==
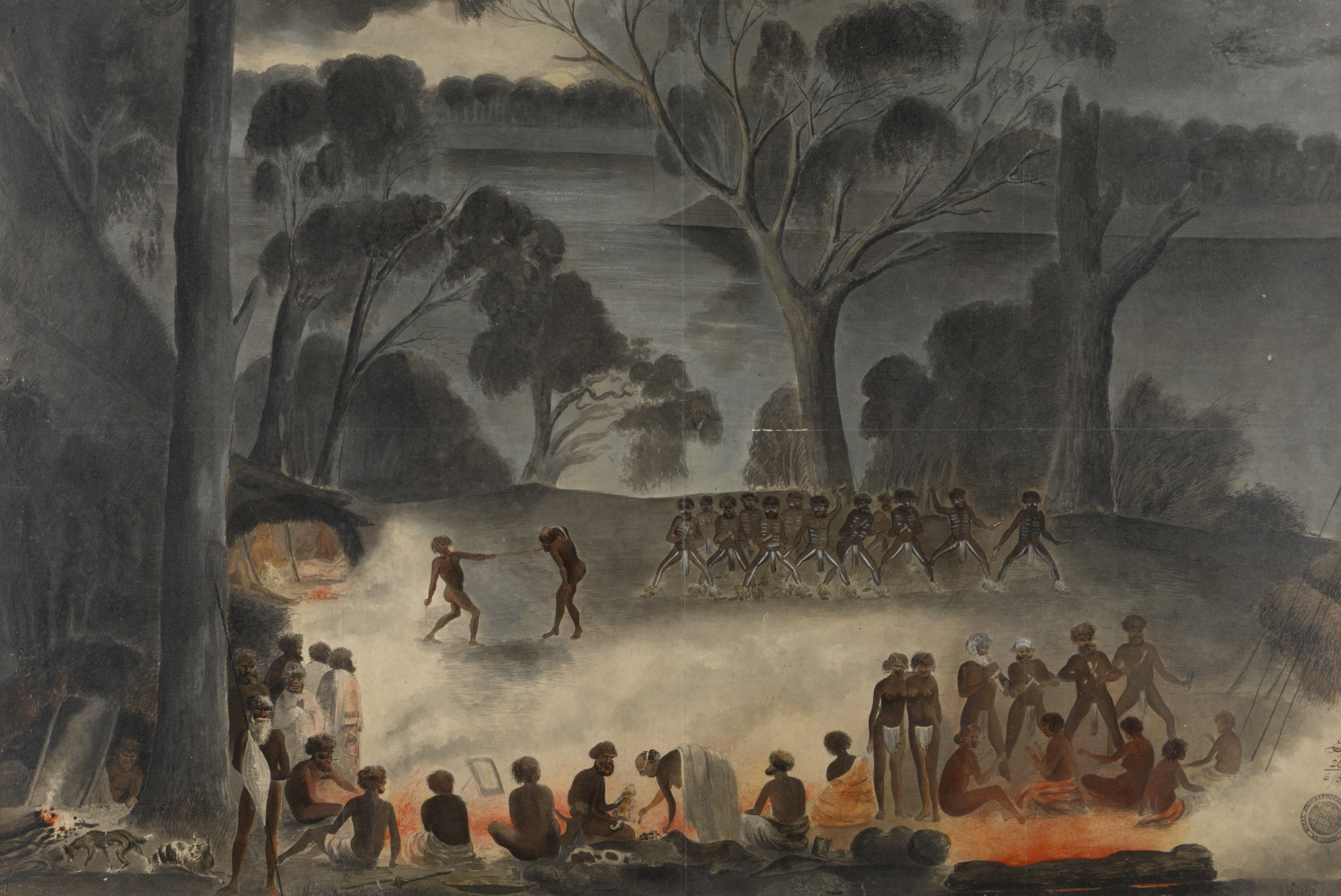
Corroboree on the Murray River: by Gerard Krefft (1857).

In order to avoid the military draft, Krefft moved to New York City in 1850, where he was employed as a clerk and a draughtsman, and was mainly concerned with producing depictions of sea views and shipping. Whilst in New York, he encountered the work of John James Audubon at the New York Mercantile Library. Having been granted permission to do so, Krefft made copies of some of the Audubon plates, which he then sold to raise his fare to Australia. Krefft arrived in Melbourne, from New York, on 15 October 1852, on the Revenue, and worked in the Victorian goldfields "with much success" for some five years. Krefft contributed examples of his drawings to the Victorian Industrial Society's Exhibition, in Melbourne, in February 1858.

== Victoria (1852 – 1858) ==
=== Melbourne ===
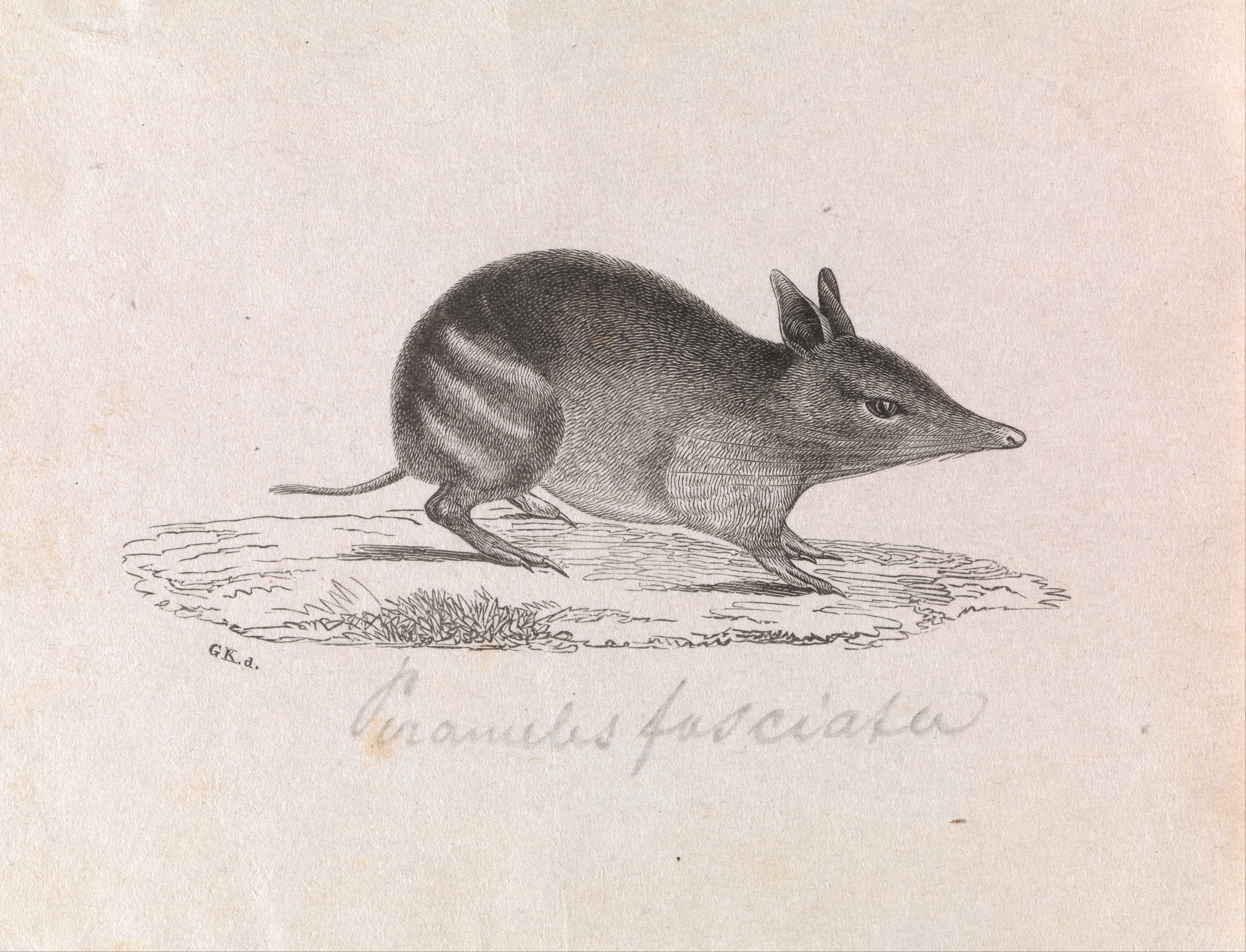
Western Barred Bandicoot (Perameles bougainville fasciata): by Gerard Krefft (1857).

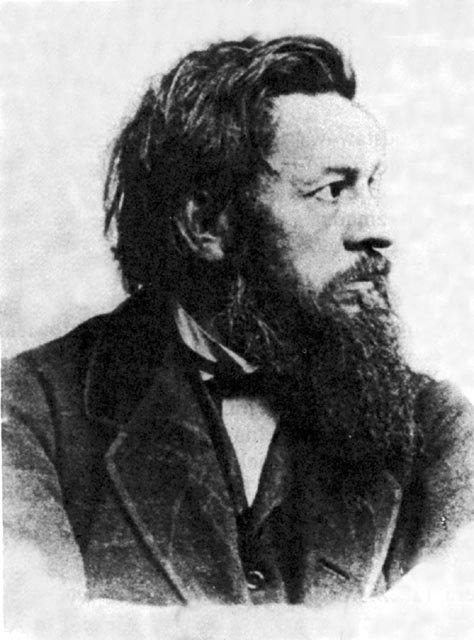
William Blandowski (c.1860).

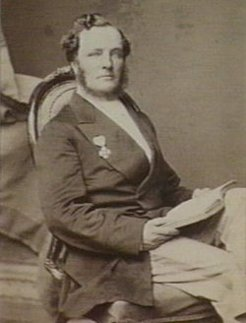
Prof. Frederick McCoy (c.1870).

Having met the mining engineer William Blandowski when he (Krefft) was making copies of Gould's illustrations of native animals in The Mammals of Australia in the Public Library of Victoria, the talented artist and draughtsman was hired, by Blandowski, "on the basis of Krefft's ability to produce detailed drawings of natural history specimens", to help sketch and collect specimens for the National Museum of Victoria on William Blandowski's expeditions into the relatively poorly-known and semi-arid country around the confluence of the Murray River and Darling River in 1856–1857. Krefft acted as Blandowski's amanuensis ("taking dictation from Blandowski by candlelight after dinner"), was responsible for the preparation of specimens, recording of all the biological material, caring for the horses and bullocks, and "much of the day-to-day work around the camp, including cooking" (Menkhorst, 2009, p. 65).

Blandowski was recalled to Melbourne by the Victorian Government in early August 1857, and he took all of his collected material back to Melbourne with him. Krefft then took command of the expedition until it finally returned at the end of November 1857. In 1858 Krefft was appointed to the National Museum of Victoria to catalogue the collection of specimens that he (i.e., Krefft) had brought back to Melbourne with him, which he listed under 3389 catalogue numbers.

=== Blandowski, the Museum of Natural History, and Professor McCoy ===
Krefft's later accounts of the expedition's discoveries (viz., 1865a and 1865b) are not only significant in themselves, but have additional significance due to the controversies surrounding Blandowski's sudden departure from Australia along with his collection of illustrations, documents, in-the-field notes, and specimens. Apart from Blandowski's (1862) controversial Australien in 142 photographischen Abbildungen nach zehnjährigen Erfahrungen ('Australia in 142 Photographic Illustrations after a Decade of Experiences'), Blandowski never published anything further in relation to that expedition.

Blandowski, one of the inaugural members of the Council of the Philosophical Society of Victoria, had been appointed as the Government Zoologist in 1854 by Andrew Clarke, Surveyor General of Victoria. He also served (ex officio) as the curator of the Museum of Natural History, which had opened on 9 March 1854, was open to the public for six hours daily, and was located in the Assay Office in La Trobe Street, Melbourne.

Blandowski's opposition to the controversial (1856) decision to (permanently, rather than temporarily) move the collection of the Museum of Natural History to the (then remote) campus of the fledgeling University of Melbourne, and deliver it over to the custody of the university's Professor of Natural Science, Frederick McCoy, who argued (1857) that museums should exist to serve the interests of real science, rather than them "being at best a place merely for [the] innocent amusement of schoolboys and idlers"— rather than, that is, follow the example of the British Museum and locate the collection within the premises of the (central) Melbourne Public Library, "which was the first free public library in Victoria and the centrepiece of public education and improvement in the colony" — led to many clashes with McCoy ("after his return to Melbourne [Blandowski] never reported back to duty at the museum").

There were also well-founded accusations that, "[having arrived] in Adelaide in August 1857 with twenty-eight boxes containing 17,400 specimens", Blandowski had failed to deliver the material collected during his expedition upon his return to Melbourne, despite being "ordered three times by the Victorian government to return his specimens and manuscripts" — a fact that explains, in the absence of any coherent account in English of Blandowski's collected material, the value of Krefft's later accounts (1865a and 1865b) of the expedition's discoveries.

When "threatened by legal action by the Victorian government over the ownership of the Expedition notebooks and illustrations" (Menkhorst, 2009, p. 85), Blandowski hurriedly (and secretly) left Melbourne, on 17 March 1859 (on Captain A.A. Ballaseyers's Prussian barque Mathilde), never to return.

== Germany ==
In 1858, following the death of his father, Krefft was obliged to return to Germany, where he travelled via England — where he visited the principal museums, met up with John Gould, John Edward Gray, Albert Günther, and Richard Owen, and presented a paper (Krefft, 1858b) to the Zoological Society of London.

Krefft took many illustrations and specimens with him; however, as Allen (2006, p. 33) notes, "after his return to Germany, Krefft attempted to publish his observations and drawings, but was prevented from doing so by Blandowski ... [with] Blandowski claim[ing to Krefft's publisher] that the artwork from the expedition belonged to him, as expedition leader".

== Natural historian, museum curator and administrator ==
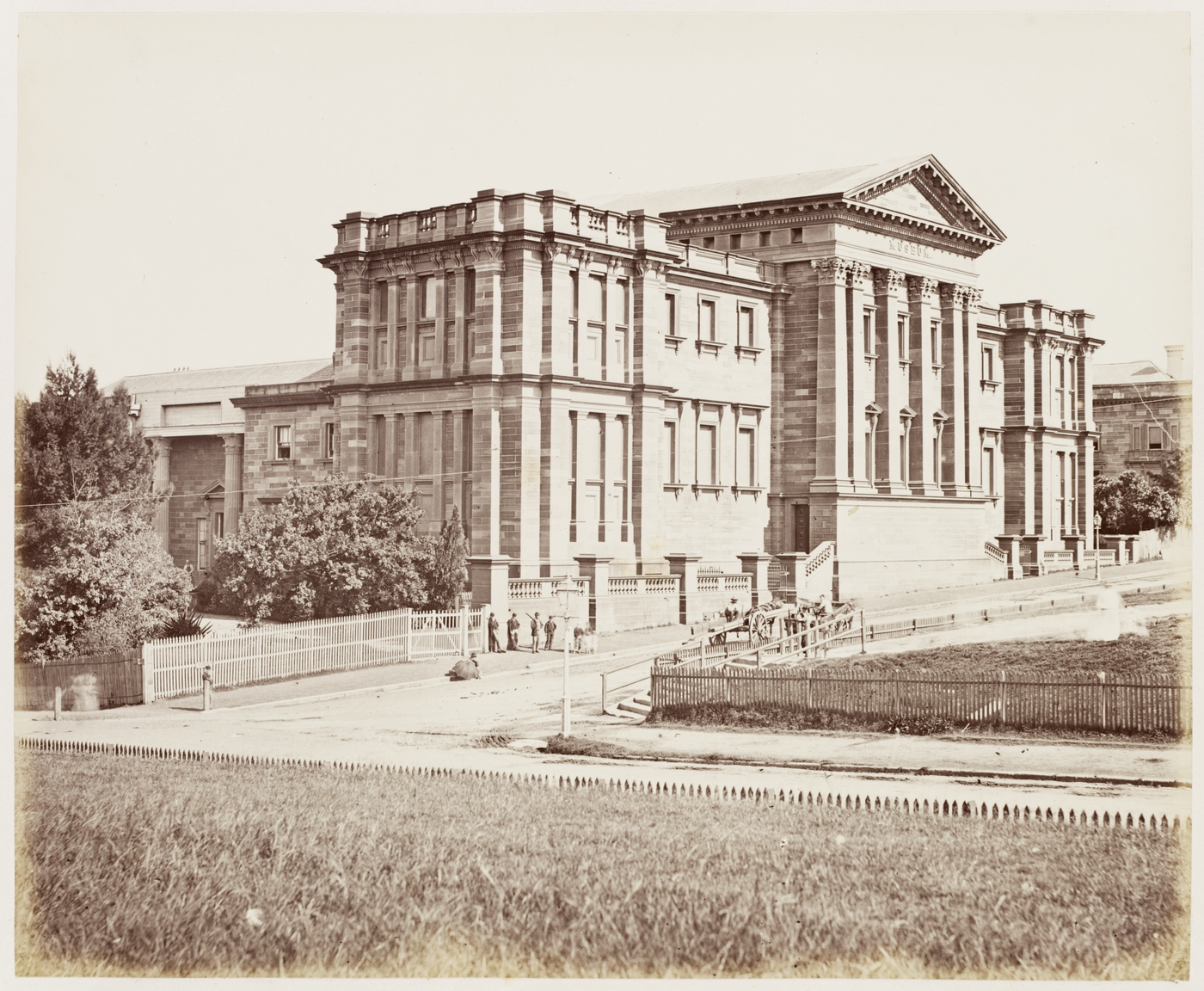
The Australian Museum (1872)

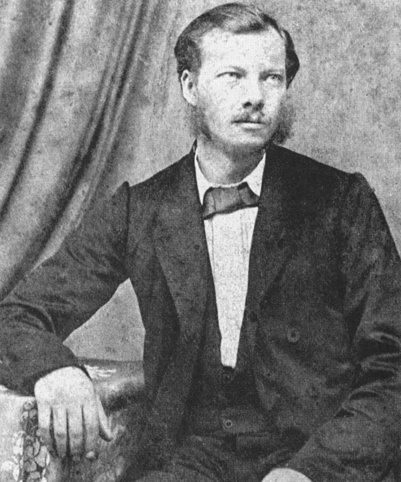
Krefft (c.1857)

Krefft returned to Australia from his sojourn in Germany, with brief stays en route at the Cape of Good Hope and Adelaide, arriving in Sydney on 6 May 1860.

In June 1860, on the recommendation of Governor Sir William Denison, he was appointed Assistant Curator to Simon Rood Pittard (1821–1861) at the Australian Museum, "much to the annoyance of the museum trustees, who would have preferred someone with a formal degree". Pittard, driven by his Anglo-Catholic, Puseyite views — and following the practice of Charles Willson Peale at the Peale Museum, in Philadelphia — adorned the walls of the Museum with inscriptions of biblical texts. Less than three weeks after Pittard's death (in August 1861) the Trustees decided that these inscriptions were "[to] be removed, and that in future "no words be inscribed on the walls of the Board Room without the consent of the Trustees"."

Having performed all of the duties of the position since Pittard's death in August 1861, Krefft was eventually appointed Curator of the museum in May 1864. During his time at the Australian Museum, Krefft maintained a relationship with the Melbourne Museum, corresponding and exchanged specimens with Frederick McCoy, its Director. He also corresponded with a wide range of eminent overseas naturalists, including Charles Darwin, A.K.L.G. Günther, and Sir Richard Owen in the UK; L.J.R. Agassiz in the USA; "and many learned German scientists". It is significant that Krefft's interactions were "informal communications with individuals rather than official dealings through government agencies, with the ensuing connections giving rise to further interactions with savants and museums in other centres of knowledge and power, including Germany, Austria, Italy, France, Sweden, Argentina, Canada, India and the United States, as well as Britain" (Davidson, 2017, p. 8).

He was also responsible for arranging and cataloguing the Museum's collection of donated fossils, as well as those he had discovered during his own exploratory efforts in the field, such as the two important excavations of the fossil remains of megafauna (mammals, birds, and reptiles) he conducted in 1866 (in the company of his assistants Henry Barnes and Charles Tost) and 1869 (in the company of his assistant Henry Barnes, along with William Branwhite Clarke, the Museum trustee, and Edward Deas Thomson, the Chancellor of the University of Sydney) at the Wellington Caves. According to Nancarrow (2009), the expenses for Krefft's fossil-collecting field trip to the Wellington Caves were £200, "but the value of the material collected (by exchange with other museums) was over £1,000" (p 149).

=== Darwinism ===
With the publication of the Origin of Species ... the entire problem [of taxonomical representation] was viewed from a different perspective [from the way that "the pre-Darwinian biologists interpreted a natural system"]. Suddenly the reason for the existence of natural systematic categories became apparent: their members were related because of descent from a common ancestor! A taxon was now interpreted as a monophyletic array of related forms.—Sokal & Sneath (1963), p. 20.

Krefft's scientific career — and, in particular, his entire professional life at the Australian Museum — was concurrent with (and greatly influenced by) the "Darwinian controversy" and its widespread ramifications; not the least of which was the central administrative (and scientific) question of which individual specimens should be exhibited (or not) in the Museum, and, if so, in what sort of order, and in which sort of way. Another concomitant and equally serious challenge to the disciplinary status quo was taxonomical: namely, the extent to which the acceptance of Darwin's notions of gradual evolution demanded that naturalists shift from polythetic "classification from below", "the grouping of species into genera, genera into tribes, tribes into families, and so on", to monothetic "classification from above", "the division of the kingdoms into phyla, phyla into classes, and so on" (Sokal & Sneath, 1963, pp. 15-16).

== "The New Museum Idea" ==
Krefft, who had returned to Australia in 1860 "with a comprehensive knowledge of the new approaches being adopted in Europe to the role and purpose of museums", was "a dynamic figure who vigorously researched, wrote about and promoted the [Australian] Museum's collections".

He served as curator at a time of significant culture change, both in terms of the place of science and scientific standards within the community, and in terms of the embedded assumptions, foundation principles, and experimental strategies of science itself. With Krefft as its curator, and despite the resistance of its trustees, the museum was slowly shifting "from [being] a colonial offshoot of the British science establishment, managed by a group of gentleman naturalists, towards [becoming] an institution serving the needs of an increasingly independent and professional group of scientists" (Stephens, 2007, p. 305).

=== Cabinets of curiosities ===
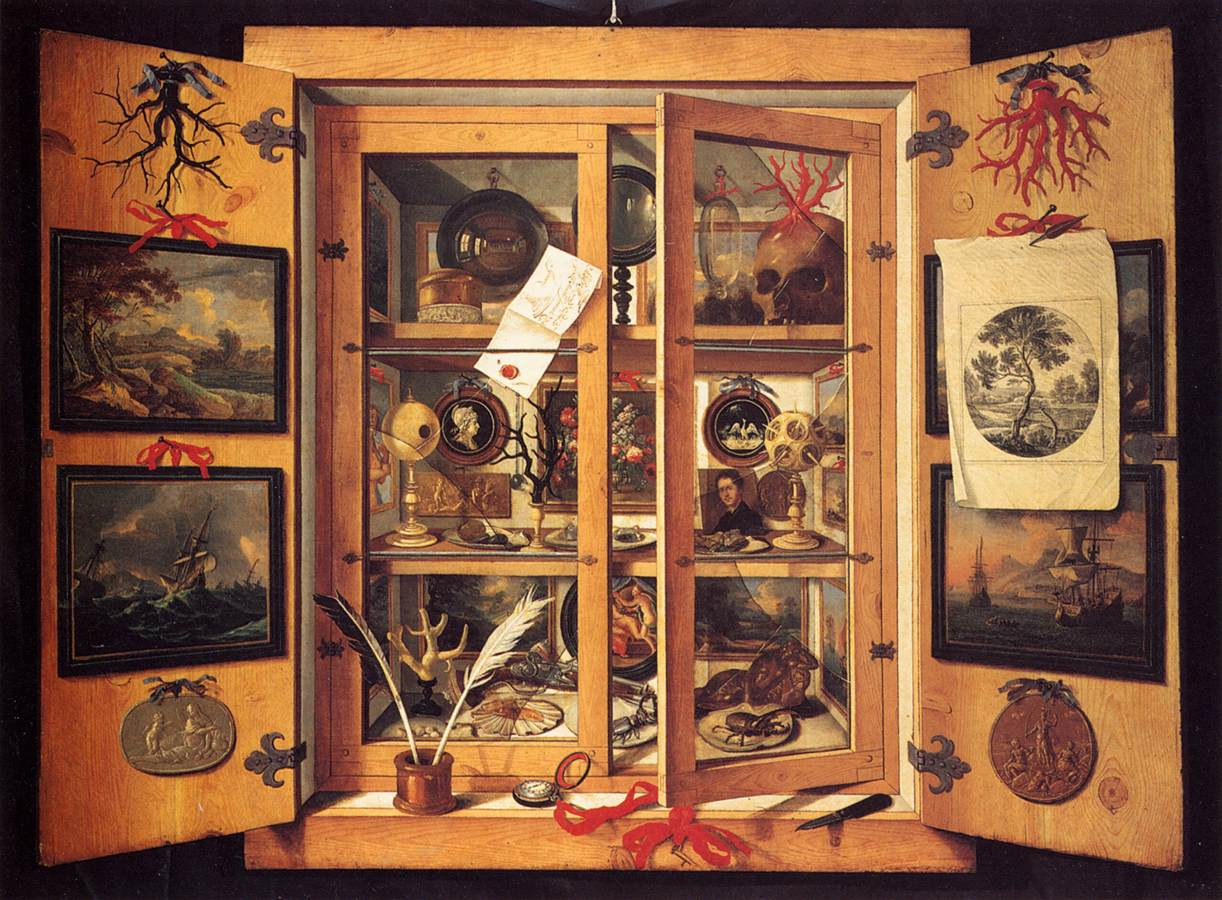
Cabinet of Curiosities, Domenico Remps (1689s)

For at least two centuries British (and colonial) museums, clearly reflecting their Wunderkämmer/Cabinets of Curiosities heritage, had done little more than present "aimless collection[s] of curiosities and bric-à-brac, brought together without method or system of collections"; where, for instance, one of the most famous collections in "bygone days", that of the seventeenth century's Musæum Tradescantianum (the collection which later provided the nucleus for Oxford University's Ashmolean Museum), "was a miscellany without didactic value", "its arrangement was unscientific, and the public gained little or no advantage from its existence" (Lindsay, 1911, p. 60).

In August 1846, within the Act establishing the Smithsonian Institution, was a provision transferring the custody of the United States' official National Cabinet of Curiosities, that had been previously deposited in the US Patent Office Building, to the Smithsonian.

=== Public museums ===
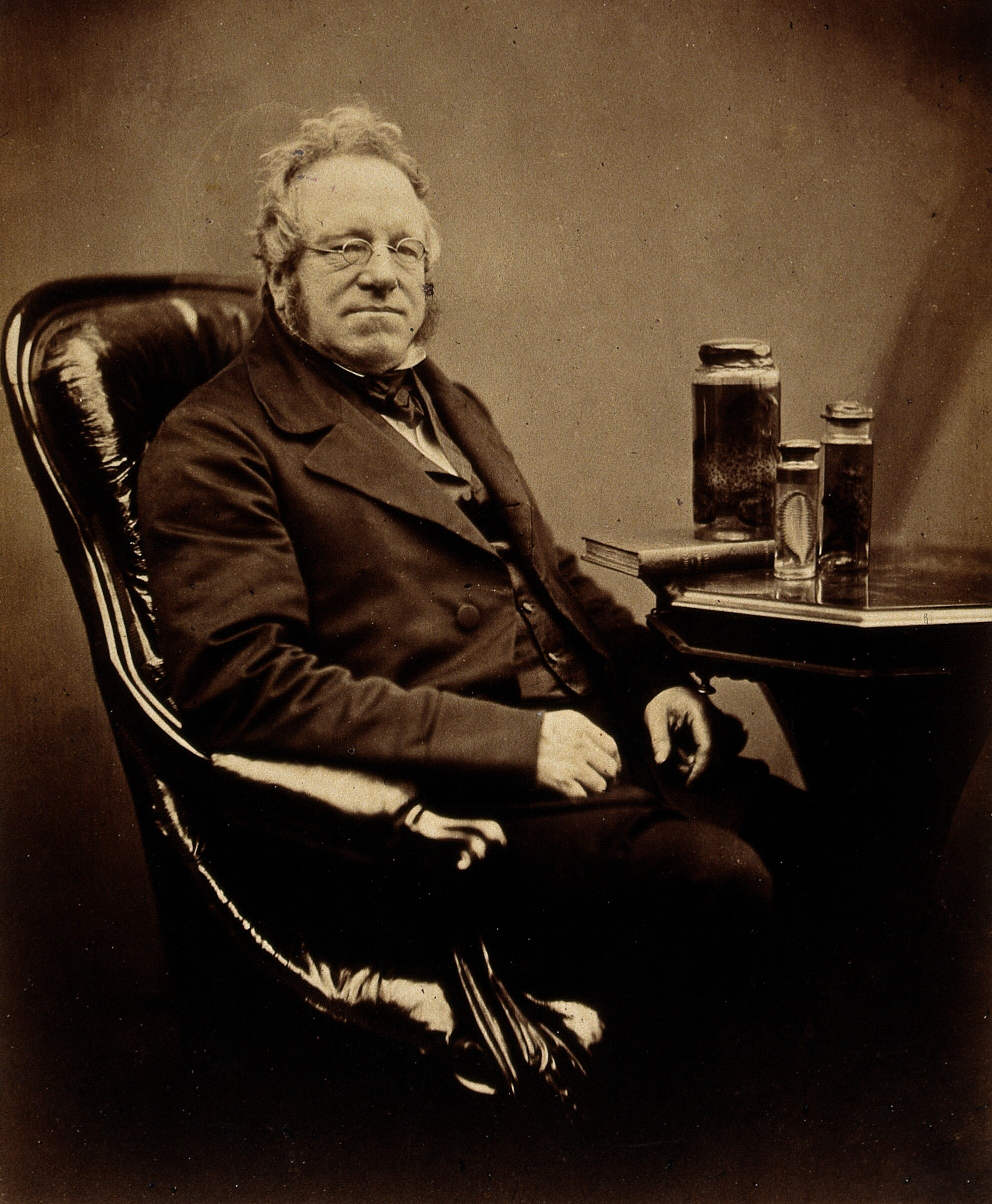
John Edward Gray (c.1860)

Acknowledging the differences between a museum's research and public pedagogy functions, and expressing his hope that his colleagues would "heartily concur in doing all that is in our power to render [the British Museum] and other institutions conducive to the increase of the knowledge, the happiness, and the comforts of the people", John Edward Gray, towards the end of his lengthy career as the Curator of the British Museum, remarked that, in his view, "public museums" were meant to serve the dual purposes of "the diffusion of instruction and rational amusement among the mass of the people, and ... to afford the scientific student every possible means of examining and studying the specimens of which the museum consists".

In the 1860s, a time when "Colonial museums tended to exhibit specimens row upon row, and for the most part neglected to incorporate up-to-date techniques such as explanatory labels and habitat cases" (Sheets-Pyenson, 1988, p. 123), Gray's scientific position, his curatorial rationale, and his administrative approach were strongly supported by Krefft. Krefft, who was "devoted to the museum's interests", rather than to those of the trustees, had already begun separating his own museum's research collections from its exhibition collections, and had already adopted many of Gray's measures by the early 1860s.

Having just received Gray's (1868) pamphlet in the mail, he emphasized — in the presentation ("Improvements Effected in Modern Museums in Europe and Australia") he gave to the Royal Society of New South Wales on 5 August 1868 — that his (Krefft's) ongoing efforts at the Australian Museum were made in the hope of changing it from being "one of the old curiosity shops of fifty years ago" into a "useful Museum" (Krefft, 1868b, p. 15). These curatorial aspirations were not unique to Krefft; they were entirely consistent with the world's best practice, as described by Gray, in relation to displaying exhibits and mounted specimens at the British Museum "to the best advantage, both for the student and for the general visitor" (Krefft, 1868b, p. 21).

=== The "new museum" ===
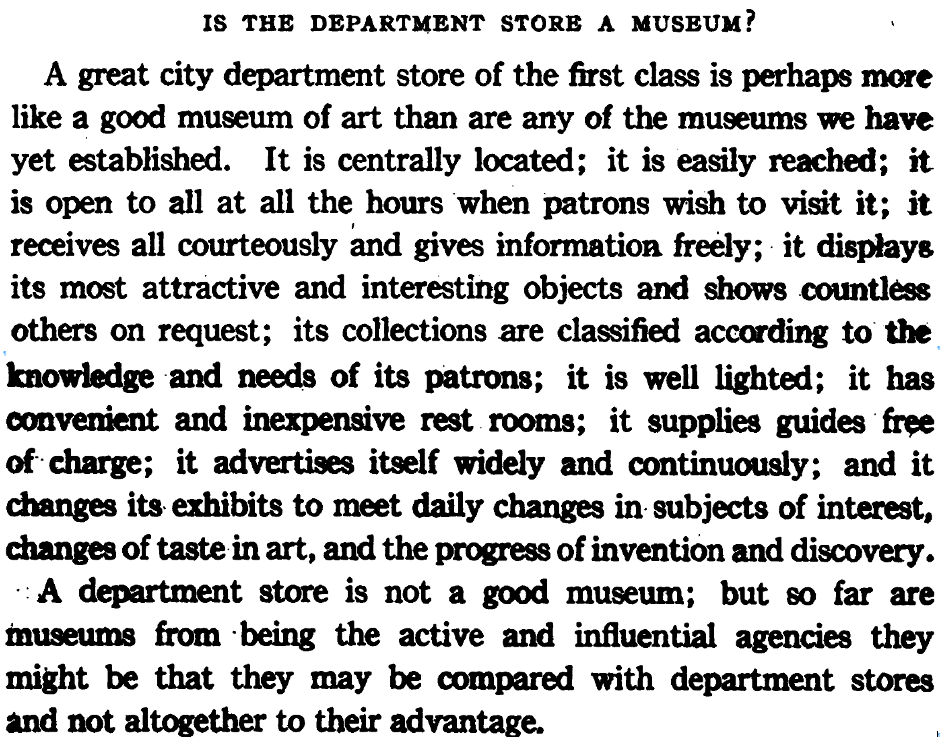
"Is the Department Store a Museum" (J.C. Dana, 1917).

In 1893, Sir William Henry Flower, labelled Gray's (1864) view "The New Museum Idea"; and characterized it as "the key-note of nearly all the museum reform of recent date", (Flower, 1893, pp. 29–30). Although these views were not unique to Gray, it does seem that Gray's (1864) axiom had the widest dissemination over the ensuing years, was the most widely quoted and, therefore, can be said to have had the greatest influence — influencing many world-wide, including Krefft, and in the UK, such as Flower, at the British Museum (see: Flower, 1898), and in the US, such as G. Brown Goode at the Smithsonian Institution (see: Goode, 1895), and Henry Fairfield Osborn, at the American Museum of Natural History (see, Osborn, 1912), etc.

In 1917, American museum director John Cotton Dana lamented the fact that there was still great room for improvement, noting that the best museum displays were to be found in department stores, rather than in museums of the day.

=== Krefft's curatorial rationale ===
Krefft actively promoted the concept of the museum as a popular institution appealing to a broader audience: that is, an establishment designed to provide experiences that engage, entertain, and educate all ages, economic groups, education levels, and social classes, as well as being a place for the collection, preservation, and display of specimens, and the production and dissemination of scientific knowledge. Krefft's curatorial advocacy of the complete separation of the Museum's at-the-time confused and disordered collection into:

(a) the exhibition spaces and the ordered, comprehensive, displays for the public (known today as synoptical collections), and
(b) the (systematically housed elsewhere on the premises) specimens, catalogues, and other research material primarily intended for research, rather than display,

produced the on-going culture-clash with the (predominately expatriate) "gentlemen amateurs" among the Trustees — including Dr. James Charles Cox, Edward Smith Hill, Sir William John Macleay, Captain Arthur Onslow, and Alexander Walker Scott, who were collectors themselves, who regarded their privileged access to the museum and its resources one of the perquisites they enjoyed in return for their unpaid services as trustees (Strahan 1979, p. 28), and were "building up [their own] private collections sometimes at the expense of the museum" — that eventually led to Krefft's later (1874) dismissal.

=== Lack of funding ===
At the same time that Krefft was experiencing difficulties with his (anti-Darwinian) trustees in relation to matters of specimen display, classification, and presentation, the trustees, themselves — who operated under the provisions of the Australian Museum Act, 1853 — continuously complained of the absence of appropriate government funding to allow, regardless of what material they might contain, the construction of the required number of display tables, display cases, and display cabinets.

Many of those annual reports also contain specific, urgent appeals for additional funding to allow the publication of various items, created by Krefft, that were, at the time, complete and printer-ready. An extended, critical editorial in The Empire in 1868 noted that, although Krefft had a "voluminous catalogue of the specimens contained in the library arranged for the printer" it appeared that "there are no funds to enable the trustees to carry out this necessary matter". In 1869, with no funds available for its publication, Krefft paid the Government Printer, himself ("£225 for 700 copies"), to produce his definitive work The Snakes of Australia (Strahan, 1979, p. 135).

== Photography ==
Coloured Photographs

Among the exhibits in the Fine Arts section of the Agricultural
Society's Exhibition, visitors will have noticed some beautiful
coloured photographs shown by Mr. Krefft.
These pictures are coloured by a process invented by Mr. Krefft,
which appears to be entirely different from any method in ordinary
use, producing an effect remarkable for its delicacy of tone, though
adhering strictly to fidelity to nature, and preserving intact the most
minute details of the original photograph.
This is particularly the case with regard to architectural views;
which are brought out by this process with great clearness, and
appear to stand forward with almost stereoscopic solidity.
Some views of foliage and forest scenery also appear to much
advantage, as coloured under the skilful manipulation of Mr. Krefft.
The Sydney Morning Herald, 16 April 1875.

One of Krefft's most important curatorial innovations was his introduction of photography, initially using his own personal camera, photographic equipment, chemicals, and photographic materials — a medium he had first encountered during his time with the Blandowski Expedition in 1856–1857 — into the Australian Museum's practice.

Photography not only provided a valuable means through which the Museum's objects and collections could be documented, but also served to substantiate the veracity of Krefft's colonial observations, and enhance his (and the Museum's) international recognition overall, due to the fact that, unlike single physical specimens, the photographs could also be "endlessly duplicated" and, therefore, sent simultaneously to a wide range of experts and centres of European and American scholarship other than just to London alone. Moreover, over time, photographs significantly reduced the need to send precious specimens and samples overseas to the detriment of the Museum's own collections: see, for instance, the (1870) photograph of Krefft's first-ever Queensland lungfish specimen (at Finney, 2022, p. 6), and the four (1870) photographs of the specimen at various stages of its dissection by Krefft (at Finney, 2022, pp. 6–7).

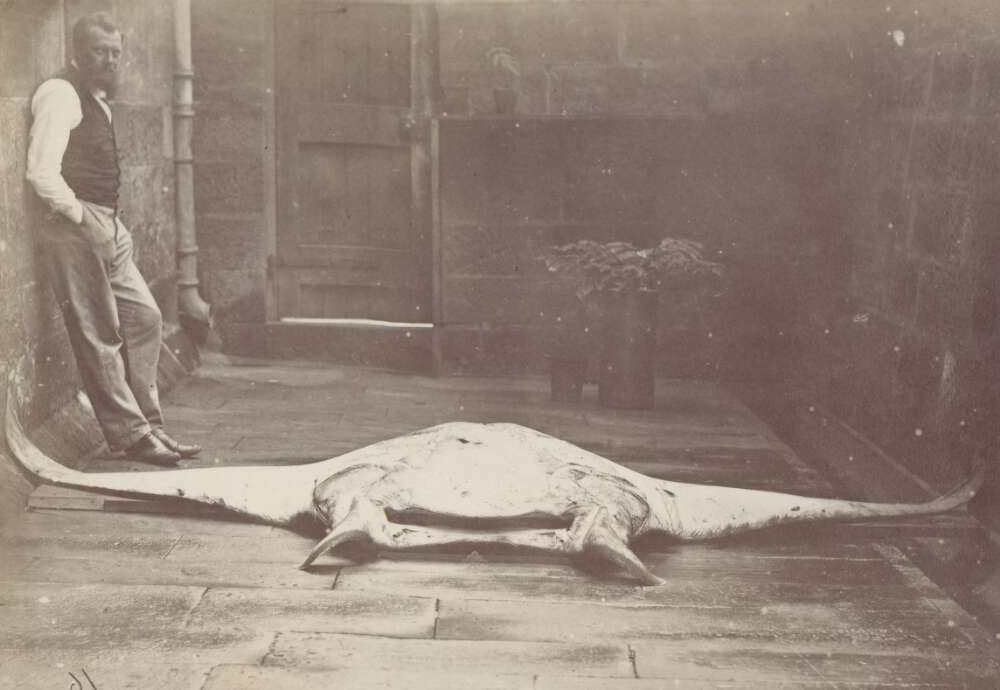
Krefft with a reef manta ray: a species he described in 1868

Over 15 years, Krefft and his assistant Henry Barnes produced thousands of photographs on glass plates using the collodion wet plate process, both at the museum and on expeditions, recording landscapes and people.

According to Davidson (2017, pp. 16, 57, 68), given London's scientific elite's widespread mistrust of the observations and material evidence of the colonial explorers and naturalists, Krefft's images not only provided "incontrovertible photographic evidence" of his claims for a specific item of interest, but also — given the extremely wide range of disciplinary mindsets prevailing at the time — served as (inclusive) "boundary objects": viz., entities that "facilitate[d] an ecological approach to knowledge making and sharing" by "provid[ing] connections between different individuals and groups who nevertheless might view them, interpret them, and use them in distinct ways, or for different aims" (p. 10).

== Queensland lungfish (Neoceratodus forsteri) ==
=== Louis Agassiz and the Chimaera ===
In 1835, having examined teeth that had been extracted from the Rhaetian (latest stage of the Triassic) fossil beds of the Aust Cliff region of Gloucestershire in South West England, the Swiss natural historian Louis Agassiz had identified and described ten different species of a holotype (or "type specimen"), which he named ceratodus latissimus ('horned tooth' + 'broadest'), and had supposed — based upon the structure of their teeth plates resembling that of a Port Jackson shark — that they were a kind of shark or ray, and from this, he had postulated, belonged to an order of the class of cartilaginous fishes (Chondrichthyes) collectively known as Chimaera.

=== Gerard Krefft, William Forster, and the cartilaginous Burnett Salmon or barramunda ===
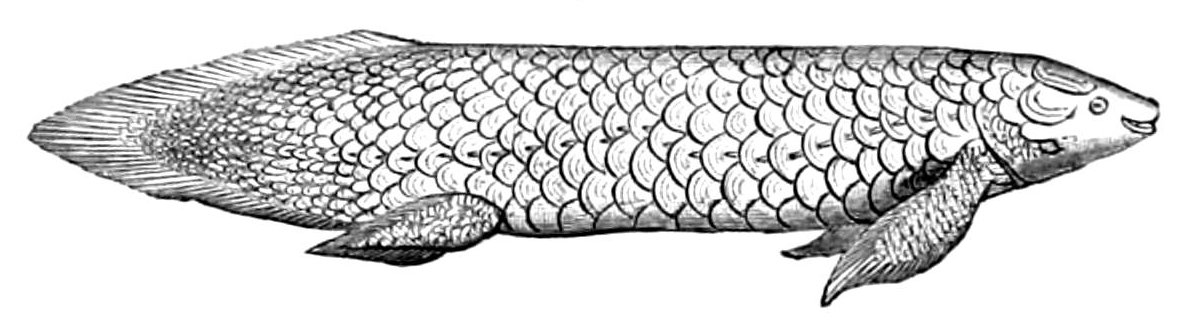
Queensland lungfish (Neoceratodus forsteri).

Over the 1860s, Krefft's regular dinner companion, the pastoralist squatter and former Premier of New South Wales, William Forster, had often spoken of the Queensland fresh-water salmon with a cartilaginous backbone, well known to the Queensland squatters as Burnett Salmon — called "salmon" because of its pink, salmon-coloured flesh and its good eating — or "barramunda" (N.B. not barramundi). On each occasion, Krefft expressed his view that Forster's claim of the existence of such a salmon was entirely mistaken.

=== January 1870 ===
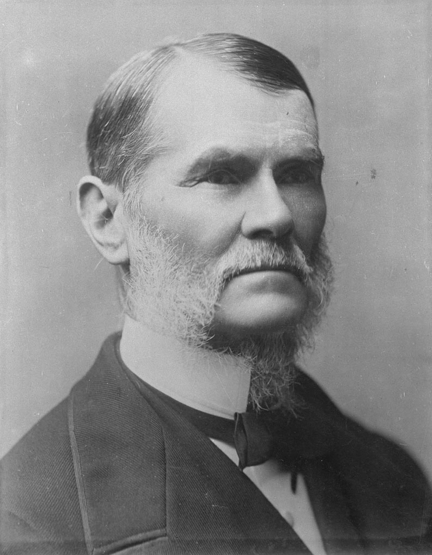
William Forster (c.1875)

In January 1870, Forster presented Krefft with an approx. 3 ft (92 cm) specimen of the Burnett Salmon that had been sent to him [Forster] by his cousin, William Forster M'Cord.

It was the first complete specimen that Krefft had ever seen. From his detailed (and, perhaps, unique to Australia) familiarity with the relevant scientific literature, and from the specimen's unusual teeth, Krefft immediately "understood its enormous significance", and recognized it as being something that "was halfway between dead (fossilised, like its nearest relatives) and alive (known to science) — and, thus, "a living example of [Agassiz's] Ceratodus, a creature, thought to have been like a shark, which had hitherto been known only from fossil teeth": a parallel to the (1994) recognition of the true identity of the Wollemi pine as a "living fossil".

The lungfish is now widely recognized as a classic example of Darwin's "living fossils" — Huxley (1880, p. 660) noted that, "this wonderful creature [sc. Ceratodus] seems contrived for the illustration of the doctrine of Evolution" — and its recognition as such, by the sagacious Krefft, represents a classic example of one of Walpole's serendipitous discoveries: i.e., those made by "accident and sagacity", in that:

(a) they were accidental: in that the discoverer was 'not in quest of' the thing discovered;
(b) they were made by one who was sufficiently sagacious to apprehend the connection between items that, to others, were completely random; and
(c) they were not hidden: they were clearly visible to the sufficiently sagacious — i.e., 'hidden in plain sight'— and, once their location was indicated, could be seen by all.

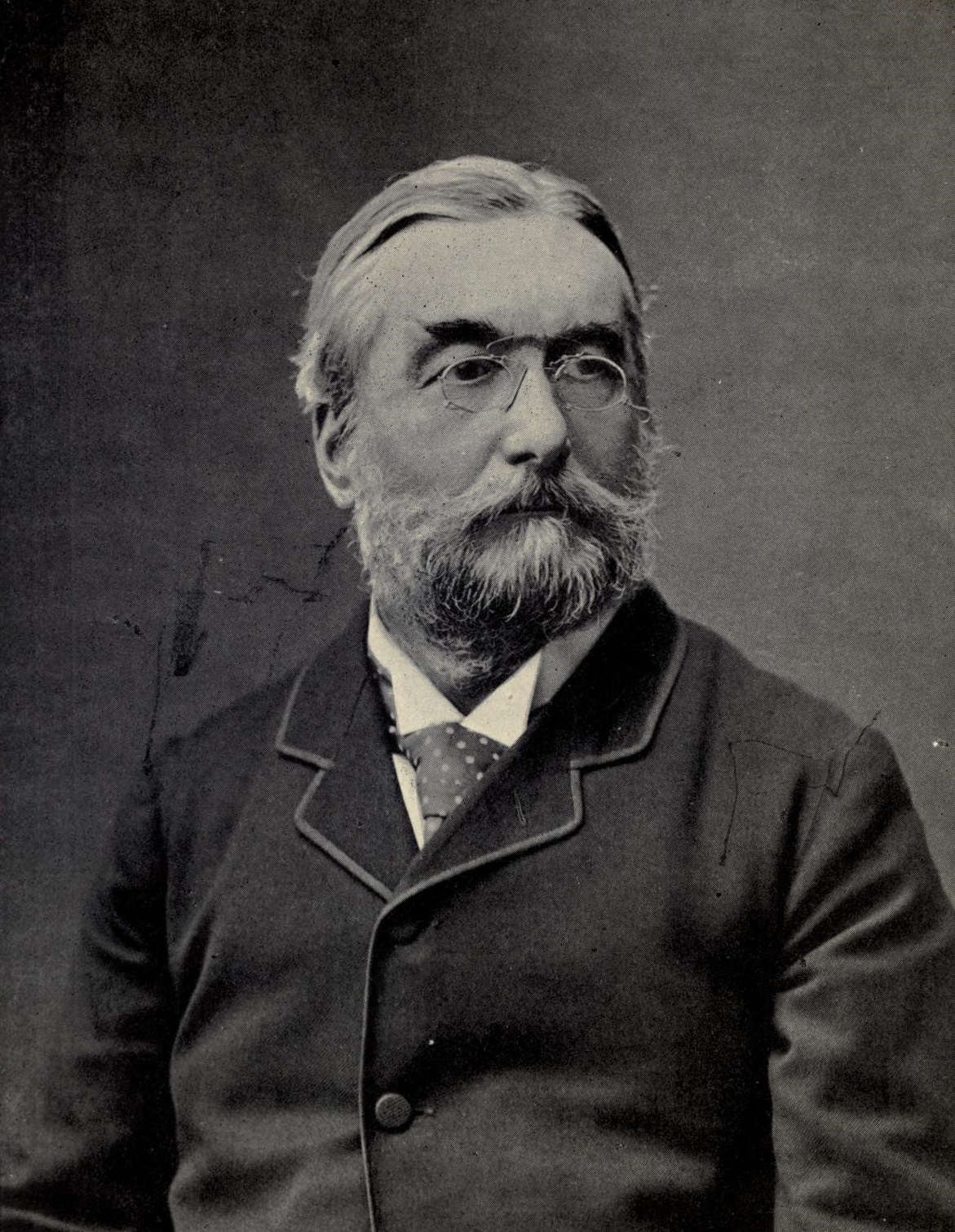
Norman Lockyer (c.1897), founder and Editor of Nature.

Krefft immediately announced his discovery in a letter to the Editor of the Sydney Morning Herald, published on 18 January 1870 (1870a); and, in doing so, he also named the specimen after William Foster: Ceratodus Forsteri. It is significant that, by announcing his discovery in the pages of a Sydney daily newspaper, rather than in some "learned British journal ... Krefft was not only claiming the lungfish, [but] was also staking a claim for Australian scientific independence". At the same time Krefft also made a request for regional settlers to provide observations and specimens of the Ceratodus for the Australian Museum.

Krefft's discovery was specifically mentioned within the comments of Australian Museum trustee Rev. William Branwhite Clarke on the mineralogical and geological exhibits at the 1870 Intercolonial Exhibition, held in Sydney; and, moreover, it was of such significance that the Exhibition's report also included a poem, highlighting Krefft's discovery, written by Clarke himself. In November 1889, Norman Lockyer, the founding Editor of Nature, noted that Krefft's discovery of "the Dipnoous [viz., 'having both gills and lungs'] fish-like creature Ceratodus of the Queensland rivers" was "[one] of the more striking zoological discoveries which come within our [first] twenty years [of publication]".

== Krefft's "Natural History" articles in The Sydney Mail ==
External media

Images
- Series of Krefft manuscripts, documents, papers, texts, etc. in the Mitchell Library, collection of the State Library of New South Wales.
- Album of 35 of Krefft's watercolours and one pencil drawing in the Mitchell Library, collection of the State Library of New South Wales.

Audio
- Early scientific photography in Australia, (ABC Radio National).
- Charles Darwin and the curator's chair, (Australian Museum).

Video
- Capturing Nature exhibition photo preview, (Australian Museum).
- Bringing Scientific Research to the Museum, Tom Gleeson's Secrets of The Australian Museum, (ABC Science).
- Gerard Krefft, Wilhelm Blandowski and the library that travelled, AMRI Seminar, Vanessa Finney, (Australian Museum).

In relation to Kreff't considerable contributions to "natural history" whilst serving as the Museum's curator, it is important to recognize that, over that time, rather than being disinterested in (or not entirely convinced by) Darwin's views on the progressive development of species, a wide range of influential individuals in Australia were implacably opposed to Darwin, Darwin's theories, and "Darwinism" in general.

=== George B. Mason and The Australian Home Companion and Band of Hope Journal ===
The Australian Home Companion and Band of Hope Journal was a fortnightly temperance-oriented journal with a limited circulation (specifically aimed at young people) that only lasted for three years (1859–1861).

Over the entire three years of the journal's existence, the wood engraver, George Birkbeck Mason, supplied a regular series of 49 wood-engravings (as "G. B. Mason"), along with brief companion articles (as "G.B.M."), under the title "Australian Natural History", which introduced various Australian animals and birds to its young readers. Mason's first article (on 2 July 1859) was on "The Ornithorhynchus; or Water Mole of Australia" (i.e., the Platypus), and his last (on 18 May 1861) was on the recently-introduced-to-Australia animal, the Llama.

=== Krefft and The Sydney Mail ===
One of Krefft's main objectives, as its curator, was to re-position the Australian Museum as a "forum of people's science" (Moyal, 1986, p. 99). With an enterprise anticipating that of the modern information scientist, Krefft recognized the economic, social, and educational value of a wider dissemination of an accurate, up-to-date knowledge and understanding of scientific matters (especially Australian natural history) to the emerging colony and its developing community, as well as "teach[ing] the interested public more about Australia's environments and animals" (Finney, 2023, p. 35).

In the absence of funding for potential museum publications, and in pursuit of a wider dissemination of these scientific matters, it is significant that from March 1871 until June 1874 Krefft contributed more than one hundred and fifty lengthy articles in the "Natural History" section of The Sydney Mail — a widely-read weekly magazine published every Saturday by The Sydney Morning Herald — on an extremely wide range of relevant subjects, specifically directed at an educated Australian lay audience; rather than, that is, engaging with his well-informed fellow scientists.

=== Krefft's Enterprise ===
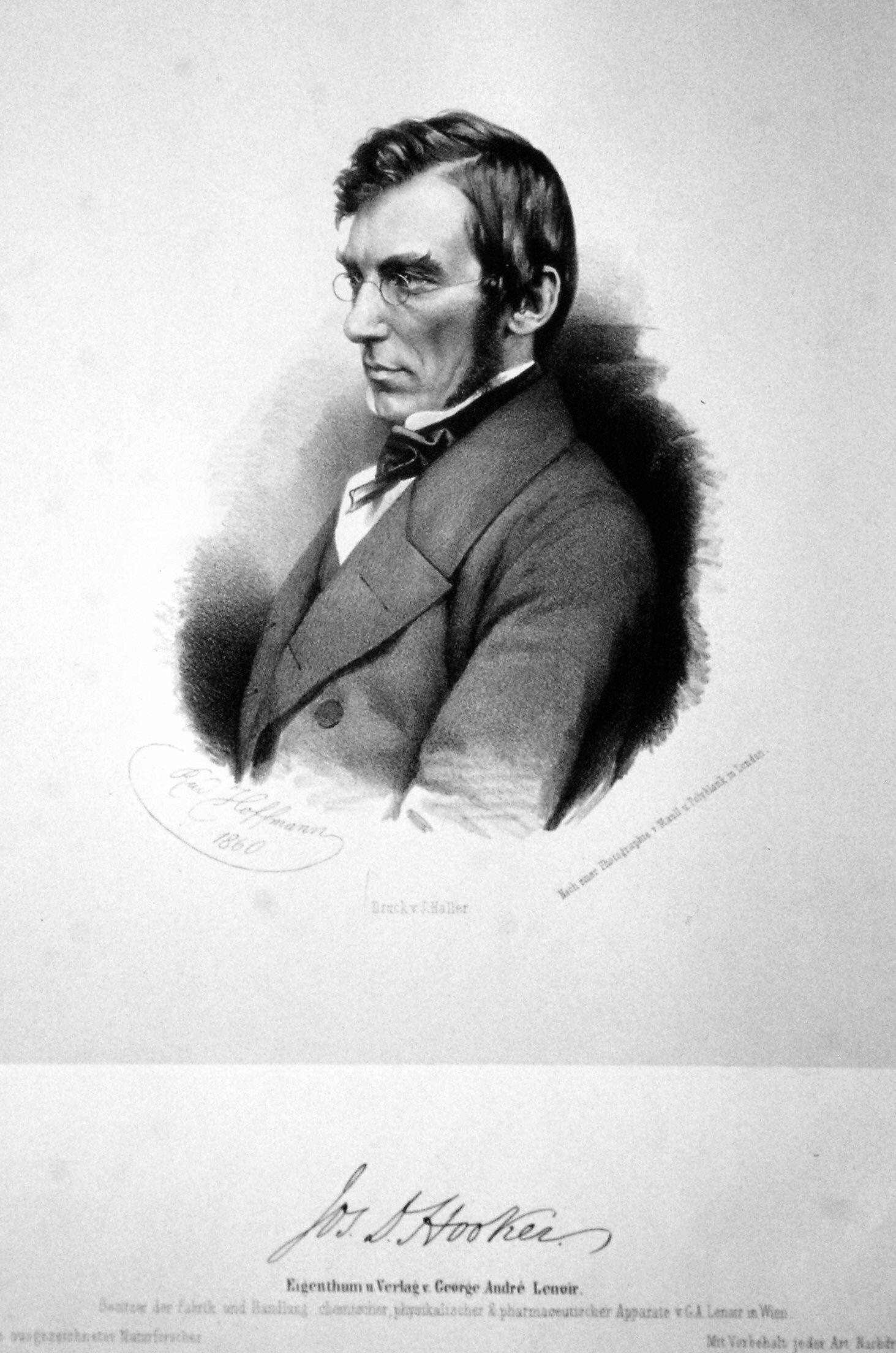
Joseph Dalton Hooker (1860)

In his first article (Krefft, 1871a) — reflecting a view that had been expressed a decade earlier by the botanist Joseph Dalton Hooker — Krefft noted that, although "few countries offer such a wide field to the student of nature as Australia", there were very few "handy books for the beginner" available in Sydney, "which has caused, in some measure, the apathy of the people to study our natural products". Moreover, he wrote, because "the most useful books" were little known, and given that many of those were "so expensive that they cannot be purchased, except by the wealthy", he proposed to present a series of articles on Australian natural history, with the hope that their aggregate would eventually be published as a complete work.

=== Charles Darwin (naturalist) ===
As part of Krefft's determination to disseminate up-to-date scientific knowledge, as reflected in the professional literature, a number of his Natural History articles mention Darwin's matter-of-fact observations and opinions as an in-the-field naturalist: including, for instance, comments such as:

- "According to Mr. Darwin, [earthworms] give a kind of under tillage to the land, performing the same below ground that the spade does above for the garden, and the plough for arable soil."—Krefft (1871d).
- "[In relation to the ruminants, and in] speaking about ten different varieties of oxen, I call attention to a curious breed of South America, of which Mr. Darwin, who first noticed it, remarks ..."—Krefft (1873b).
- "Mr. Darwin has been quoted [in this article] at great length, because his experience ... [of] animals under domestication ... will interest all breeders."—Krefft (1873c), etc.

=== Support of Darwin, Darwinism, and Natural Selection ===
By July 1873, according to his (c.12 July 1873) letter to Charles Darwin, Krefft had become exasperated by the widespread resistance to Darwin's theories and observations (and, indirectly, also to those of Bishop Colenso); an unwillingness which, Krefft observed, was not only driven by the persistent outright misrepresentations of Darwin's works by certain prominent critics (such as Professor McCoy and Bishop Perry), but was also explained by the fact that the preponderance of those in Australia who were opposed to Darwin's "theories" had never read any of Darwin's works and (with no other sources of information to go by) were basing their steadfast adversarial positions entirely upon the supposed authority of others: "if ever there was a season when people flock round those who interpret the faith in which they were brought up, it is the present time, in Australia at least" (Krefft, 12 July 1873).

Krefft wrote of the "dreadful [overall] ... ignorance of even well educated people", and the constant criticisms of Darwin's "theories" that were still being voiced in Melbourne, 13 years after the publication of Origins, by the devout Irish Roman Catholic Professor Frederick McCoy, Professor of Natural Science at the University of Melbourne, and the director of the National Museum of Victoria, and the Evangelical Anglican Bishop of Melbourne Charles Perry, as well as the recent (7 July 1873) well-attended "Noah's Ark" lectures, that had been delivered in Sydney by the Melbourne-based Irish Jesuit, Joseph O'Malley, and chaired by the devout Irish Roman Catholic layman, Justice Peter Faucett of the Supreme Court of New South Wales.

In his letter to Darwin, noting that he "never meddles with religion", Krefft stated that he deliberately avoided any reference to questions relating to the existence (or not) of the Abrahamic deity in his articles: "Of course I shall not deny the existence of a supreme superintendent or whatever people choose to call the power of nature as yet unknown to us otherwise rather [to his "astonishment"] religious papers will not like to print my remarks".

=== July 1873 ===
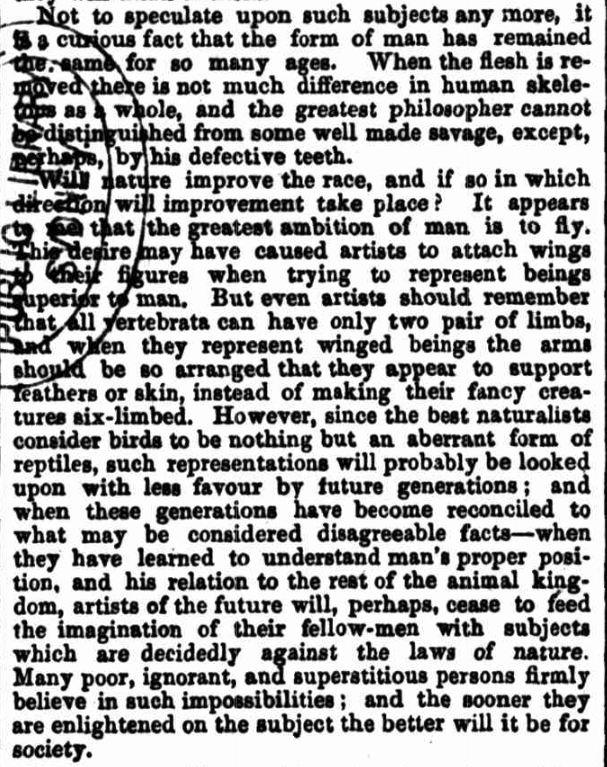
Remarks on the traditional artistic depiction of Angels, Sydney Mail, 5 July 1873.

In his quest to encourage people to read Darwin's works, and to present a summary of the relevant scientific advances in the field (as represented in the professional literature), Krefft published two important "Natural History" articles in July 1873 — and, as was his habit, Krefft took the position of presenting the latest views and opinions of others (for the edification of his readers), rather than expressing his own:

- "Remarks on New Creations" on 5 July 1873.
- "Remarks on New Hypotheses" on 12 July 1873.

==== "Remarks on New Creations" ====
The first article, centred upon an objective discussion of the current developments in the scientific understanding of artificial selection and human evolution (contrasted with the supposed 'immutability of species'), only expressing Krefft's personal views towards the end of the article, when speaking of the "poor, ignorant, and superstitious" people, whose artistic representations of angels were "decidedly against the laws of nature".

==== "Remarks on New Hypotheses" ====
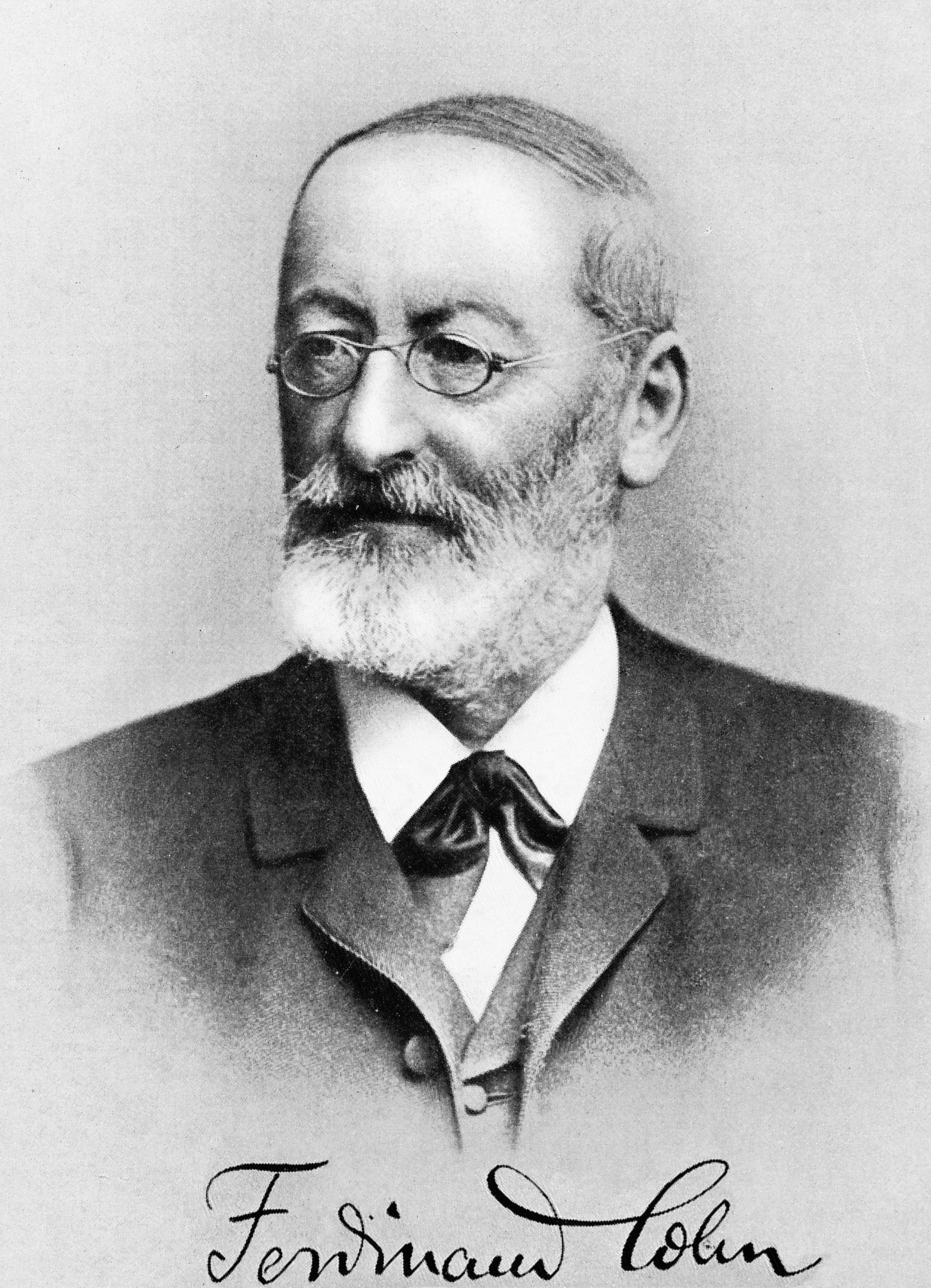
Ferdinand Cohn (c.1891)

According to Krefft's postscript to his letter to Darwin, the second article was only published after significant censorship by the editor of the Sydney Mail, George Eld, at the express (and extraordinary) instruction of John Fairfax, proprietor of the Sydney Mail, to remove Krefft's favourable references to Darwin and his works — according to Krefft, despite being "rather a thorough believer in revealed Religion", Fairfax generally "allow[ed] me to give an opinion now and then as long as [I] do not come it too strong". Consequently, rather than expressing his own views, opinions, and explanations of Darwin's work, as he had intended, three-quarters of Krefft's second article directly refers to the opinions expressed in a recent address, "The Progress of Natural Science During the Last Twenty-Five Years", given at Breslau (now Wrocław, Poland), by the University of Breslau's Professor Ferdinand Cohn in late 1872. Krefft's direct quotations included:

- "There are three discoveries which, during the last quarter of a century, have entirely changed the position of natural science — the mechanical equivalent of heat, spectrum analysis, and the Darwinian theories."
- "No book of recent times, Dr. Cohen [sic] thinks, has influenced to such an extent the aspects of modern natural science as Charles Darwin's work On the Origin of Species, the first edition of which appeared in 1859 (the last or sixth edition in January, 1872); for even so late a period was the immutability of species believed in; so long was it accepted as indubitable that all characteristics which belong to any species of plants and animals were transmitted unaltered through all generations, and were under no circumstances changeable; so long did the appearance of a new fauna and flora remain one of the impenetrable mysteries of science."

=== Post-dismissal ===
Due to the distractions connected with the last stages of his disputes with the trustees of the Australian Museum, the last item he published whilst still Museum curator was on 27 June 1874. Sixteen weeks later, following his separation from the Museum, he resumed his weekly articles, and went on to publish another thirty-seven "Natural History" articles over the next nine months.

Although Krefft produced more than 250,000 words in the more than 180 "Natural History" articles published over that four-year period, his hope of eventually producing an aggregated single work was never realized; no doubt mainly due to his dismissal from office having greatly limited his resources and significantly restricted his capacity to continue his dissemination enterprise.

== Dismissal from office ==
The Trustees controversially dismissed Krefft from his position of Curator in 1874. "The casus belli, now long forgotten, turned on the allegation that Krefft had mishandled a theft that had occurred in the Museum" (MacLeod, 2009, p. 145). Krefft's position was that the trustees, acting independently of the New South Wales government, had no right to dismiss him.

Krefft's assistant curator for the preceding decade, George Masters, had resigned in February 1874 in order "to become curator of the growing collection of Sir William Macleay" (Strahan, 1979, p. 135) — a collection which Masters continued to curate, once it was transferred to the Macleay Museum at the University of Sydney, until his death in 1912.

The Museum trustees, at a special meeting held the day after Krefft's removal from the Museum's premises, appointed the Macleay protégé, Edward Pierson Ramsay, to the position of Curator (Strahan, 1979, p. 38), an office that Ramsay held until 1895, when he was succeeded by Robert Etheridge.

=== Gold theft and its aftermath ===
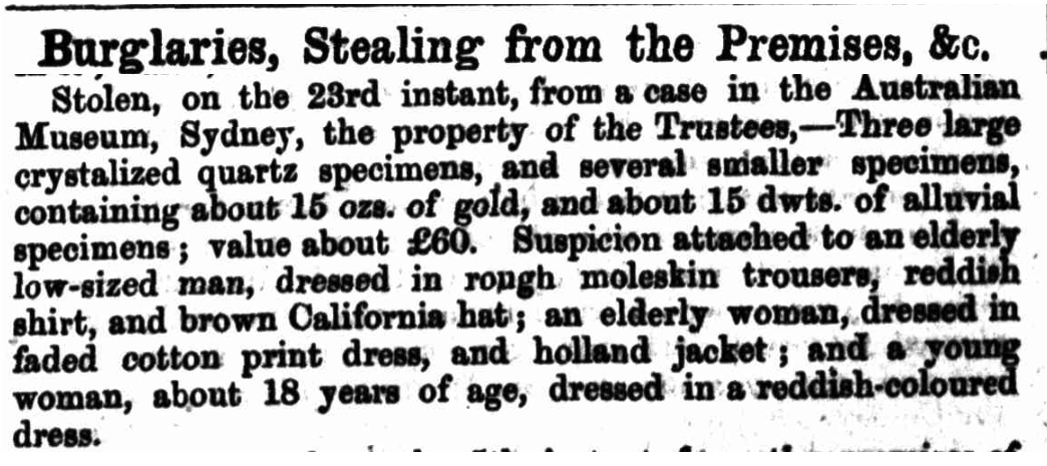
First Police Report (1873): 23 December 1873 robbery.

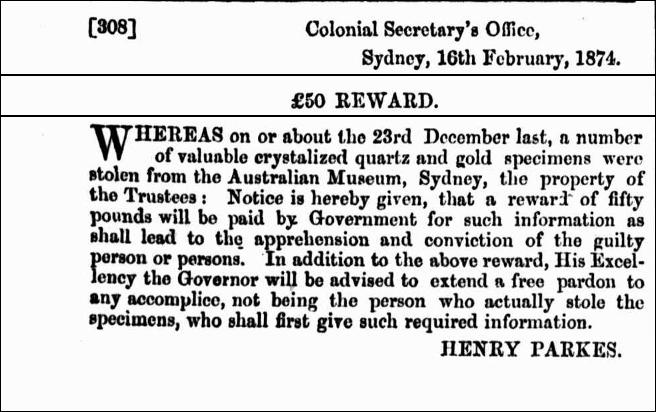
Reward Notice (1874): 23 December 1873 robbery.

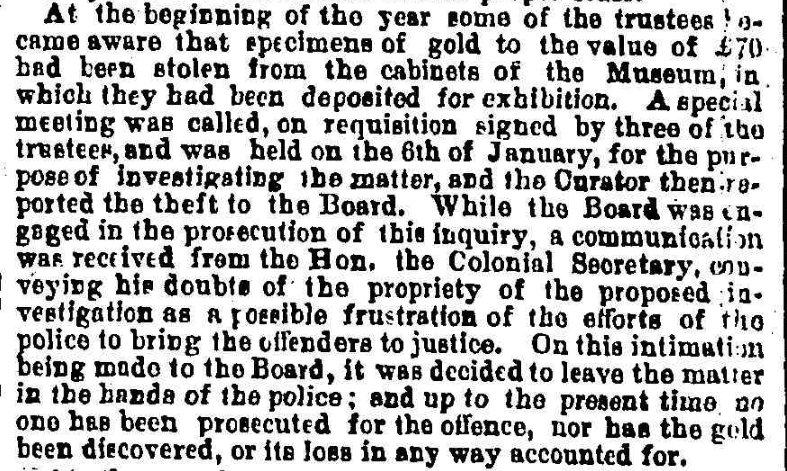
Trustees Report (1875): 23 December 1873 robbery.

Following his return to the Museum on Christmas Eve 1873, Krefft reported to the trustees (who were individually and collectively unaware that any theft had taken place) that he had discovered a robbery of "specimens of gold to the value of £70". The crime was never solved; and the trustees (although eager to do so) were unable to find any evidence of Krefft's complicity in the theft. By this stage, with his accusations that the trustees were using the Museum's resources to augment their own private collections, the "cosmopolitan" Krefft had fallen foul of most of the Trustees, especially William John Macleay, whose own extensive private collection — which included the comprehensive collections he had inherited from his uncle, Alexander Macleay (1767–1848), and his cousin, William Sharp Macleay (1792–1865) — went on to become the foundation of the collections of the Macleay Museum at the University of Sydney in the 1890s.

=== Museum closure ===
In the process of the escalating dispute between the trustees and Krefft, the Museum was closed to the public, by order of the trustees, for eleven weeks (from 4 July to 23 September 1874), At the same time, a police guard was stationed at the Museum, and Krefft was denied access to all parts of the Museum (including the cellar within which the fuel for his much-needed-in-the-winter fires was stored), except his private residence.

Krefft had been suspended following an investigation by a subcommittee of trustees — Christopher Rolleston, Auditor-General of New South Wales, was appointed chairman, and Archibald Liversidge, Professor of Geology and Mineralogy at the University of Sydney, Edward Smith Hill, wine and spirit merchant, and Haynes Gibbes Alleyne, of the New South Wales Medical Board — who, having examined a number of witnesses, found some of the charges against Krefft sustained, and also claim to have discovered "a number of [other] grave irregularities".

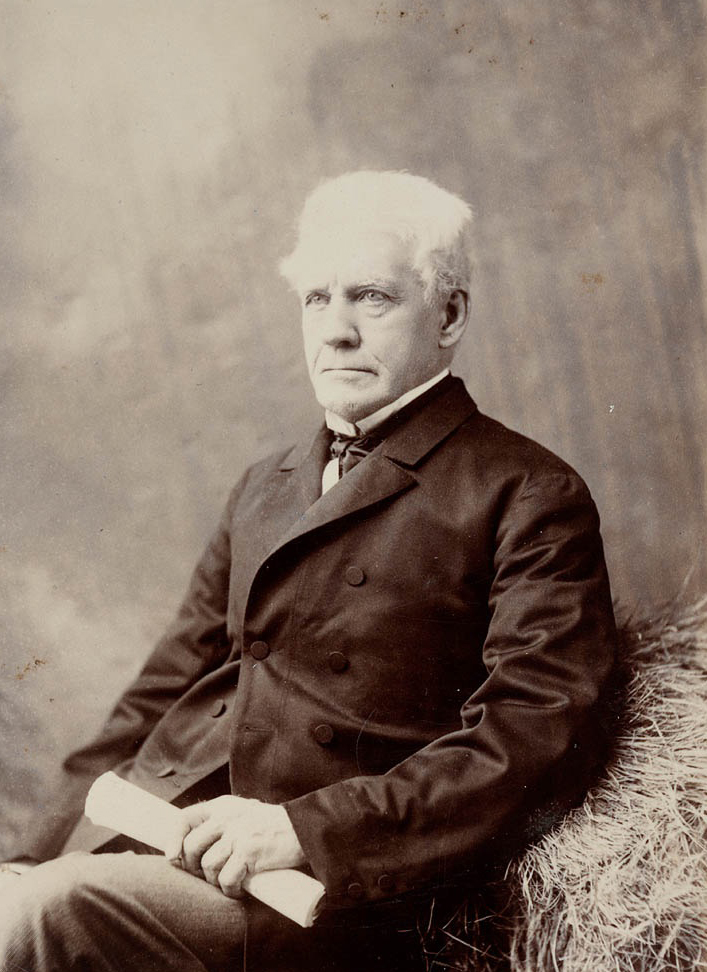
George Bennett (c.1910).

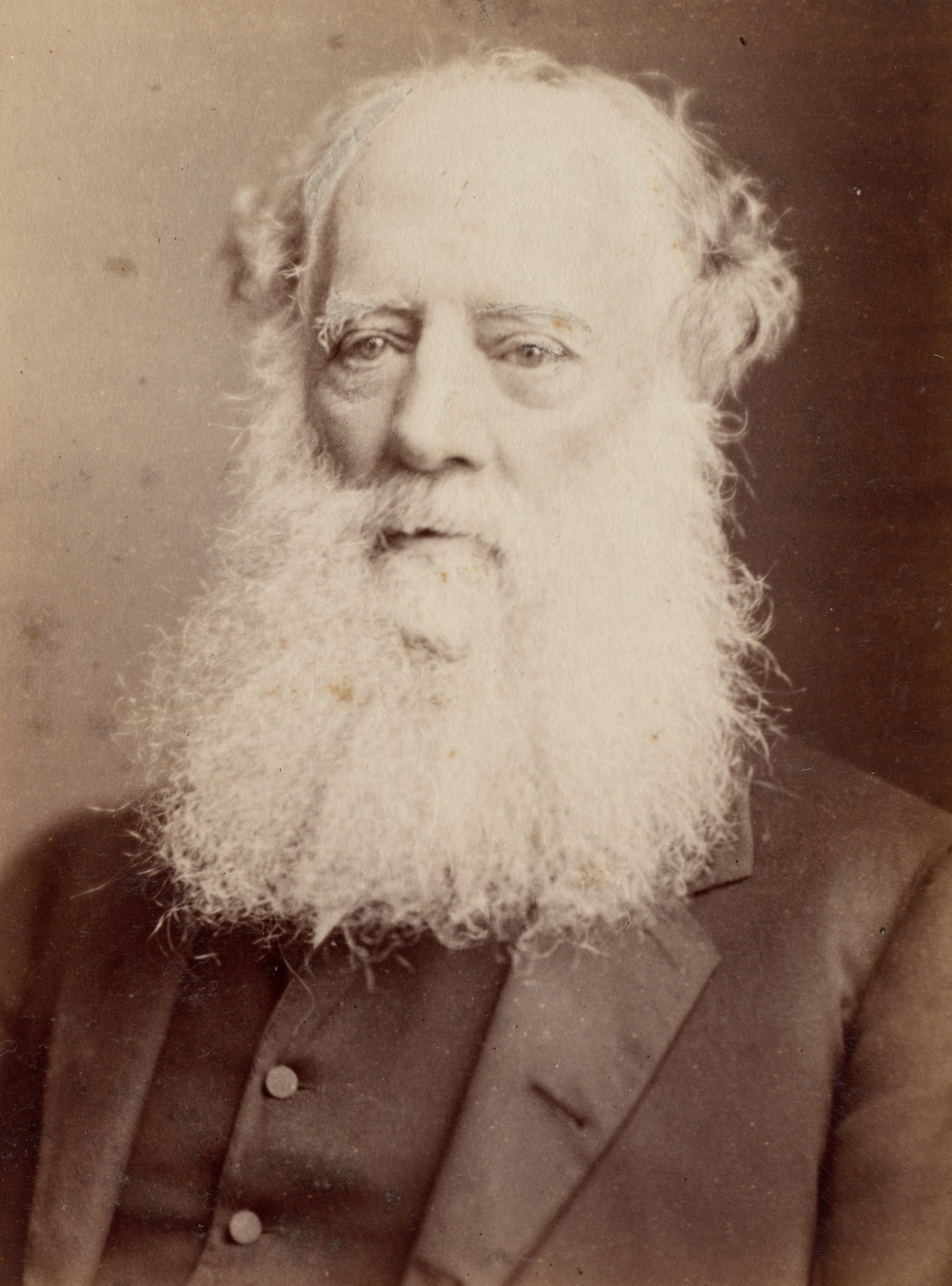
Rev. William Branwhite Clarke (c.1875).

Krefft had been unable to meet the trustees' request to appear before them on the Thursday (2 July 1874) because he was unwell (he had supplied a medical certificate to that effect), and that his wife, whose difficult confinement had been attended by George Bennett, had just delivered a stillborn child (on 2 July 1874), a daughter, after two days of intense labour (with Krefft by her side the whole time) in their residence over the Museum.

=== Eviction from his residential quarters ===
On 1 September 1874, three weeks before Krefft's forceful eviction, long-term trustees George Bennett (who, at the time, was attending Mrs Krefft's confinement) and William Branwhite Clarke both resigned "as a consequence of the steps recently taken by the trustees of the Museum with respect to the Curator".

On 21 September 1874, Krefft and his family were physically removed from his Museum apartment within which he had barricaded himself, by the "diminutive bailiff" Charles H. Peart — i.e., at least "diminutive" when compared with Krefft, "a man of herculean stature" — in the company of one of the trustees, Edward Smith Hill, and assisted by two known prizefighters (identified as Kelly and Williams) who had been expressly hired (from Kiss's Horse Bazaar) to effect the eviction, because the Police refused to act, on the grounds that Krefft had not been dismissed by the Government, only by the trustees (and, therefore, it was a civil (and not a police) matter).

At the time of his eviction, Krefft was forcibly carried out of his apartment, refusing to move from his chair, and was unceremoniously thrown out into Macquarie street by the prizefighters. The press report of Krefft's subsequent (November 1874) damages action noted that, "throughout the affair [Krefft] had denied the trustees' power to dismiss him; and, on the trustees appealing to the Government, the Colonial Secretary [viz., Henry Parkes] had cautiously told the trustees that, as they thought it expedient to expel [Krefft] without first seeking the advice of the Government, no assistance could be afforded".

At the time of Krefft's forcible eviction, all of his possessions were seized; and, almost two years after the eviction Krefft was still complaining that "my own and my wife's personal property, my books, specimens, scientific instruments, medals and testimonials", all of which had been "illegally taken possession of by the trustees", were still to be returned to him.

=== Trustee's allegations ===
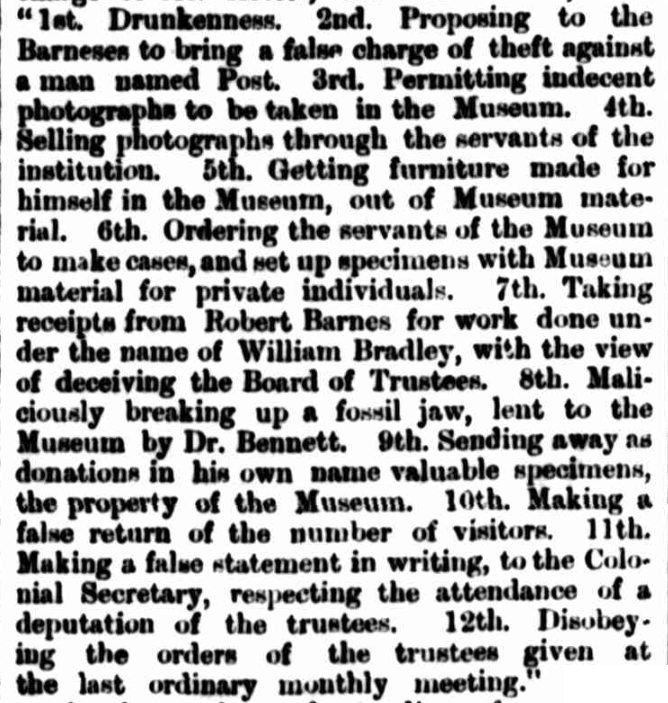
The 12 Charges levelled against Krefft in July 1874.

The Trustees have to express their deep regret that circumstances have occurred during the past year which disclosed an utter want of care and attention in the discharge of his duties on the part of Mr. Krefft, their curator and secretary, and which resulted, after repeated acts of disobedience to the lawful orders of the trustees, in the removal of that officer from his position, and in the closing of the institution to the public for a short period.—Trustees' justification for Krefft's dismissal in their Report to the NSW Parliament for the year 1874.

The trustees — two members of which, William Macleay and Captain Arthur Onslow (although both were Members of the Legislative Assembly they were not trustees, ex officio, but had been elected to their trustee position), "manifested great animus towards Mr. Krefft, and used their utmost exertions to cast obloquy upon that gentleman" — responded by accusing Krefft of drunkenness, falsifying attendance records, and wilfully destroying a fossil sent to the Museum by one of its trustees, George Bennett, for its preparation to be sent on the Richard Owen at the British Museum. This entirely false allegation was completely (and independently) refuted by a letter from Owen, that Bennett had received in late June 1874, in which Owen "acknowledged receiving [the fossil specimen] in good order".

Krefft was even accused of condoning the sale of pornographic postcards. The (fifty to sixty) postcards in question, of which the trustees claimed in their justification of Krefft's dismissal, "some of which were of the most indecent character" (and had been "seen" by one of the trustees "in the workshop of the Museum") — which, rather than being salacious items were, in fact, standard ethnographic photographs taken in the field — had been copied, entirely without Krefft's knowledge or consent, by museum employees Robert and Henry Barnes.

=== Legal actions ===
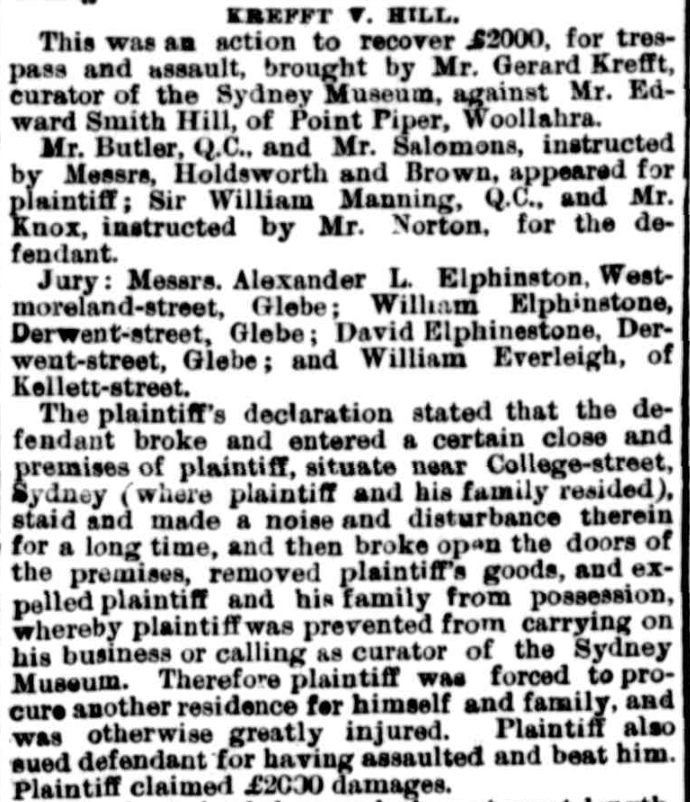
Krefft's 1874 damages action.

[In these matters] I am only one against many and you know that law is expensive and only made for the rich. Had I been an Englishman by birth, had I humbugged people, attended at Church, and spread knowledge on the principle that the God of Moses and of the Prophets made "little apples", I would have gained the day, but [as] a true believer in [your] theory of developement [sic] I am hounded down in this [Paradise] of Bushrangers' of rogues, Cheats, and Vagabonds".—Krefft to Charles Darwin (22 October 1874), seeking Darwin's support.

In November 1874 Krefft brought an action to recover £2,000 damages for trespass and assault against the trustee, Edward Smith Hill, who was physically present at, and had directed his eviction.

The trial lasted four days, and Justice Alfred Cheeke, the presiding judge "ruled that [Hill] and his co-trustees had acted illegally", and that, "as the trustees had no power to appoint a Curator, they clearly had no power to remove him from office, or expel him from the Museum premises", and, finally, that "[because] the Curator was an officer receiving his salary from the Government, ... he could not be removed from the premises without the sanction of the Government". "The jury [of four], after a short deliberation, found a verdict for the plaintiff, with £250 for damages".

In September 1875, Hill applied to the NSW Supreme Court for a retrial, and his motion for a new trial was heard by Justices John Fletcher Hargrave and Peter (Noah's Ark) Faucett over three days (7 to 9 September). Justice Hargrave, noting that the trustees' behaviour was "altogether illegal, harsh, and unjust", and that they had acted "without affording [Krefft] the slightest means of vindicating himself personally, or his scientific or official character as Curator of our Museum" was of the opinion that a new trial should be refused. In contrast, Justice Faucett, noting that Krefft "[had] taken an altogether erroneous view of his position and of the powers of the trustees; and [he, Faucett was] clearly of [the] opinion that his conduct justified his dismissal", was of the opinion that a new trial should be granted. Given these conflicting opinions, the court decided that Hill's action could not be heard.

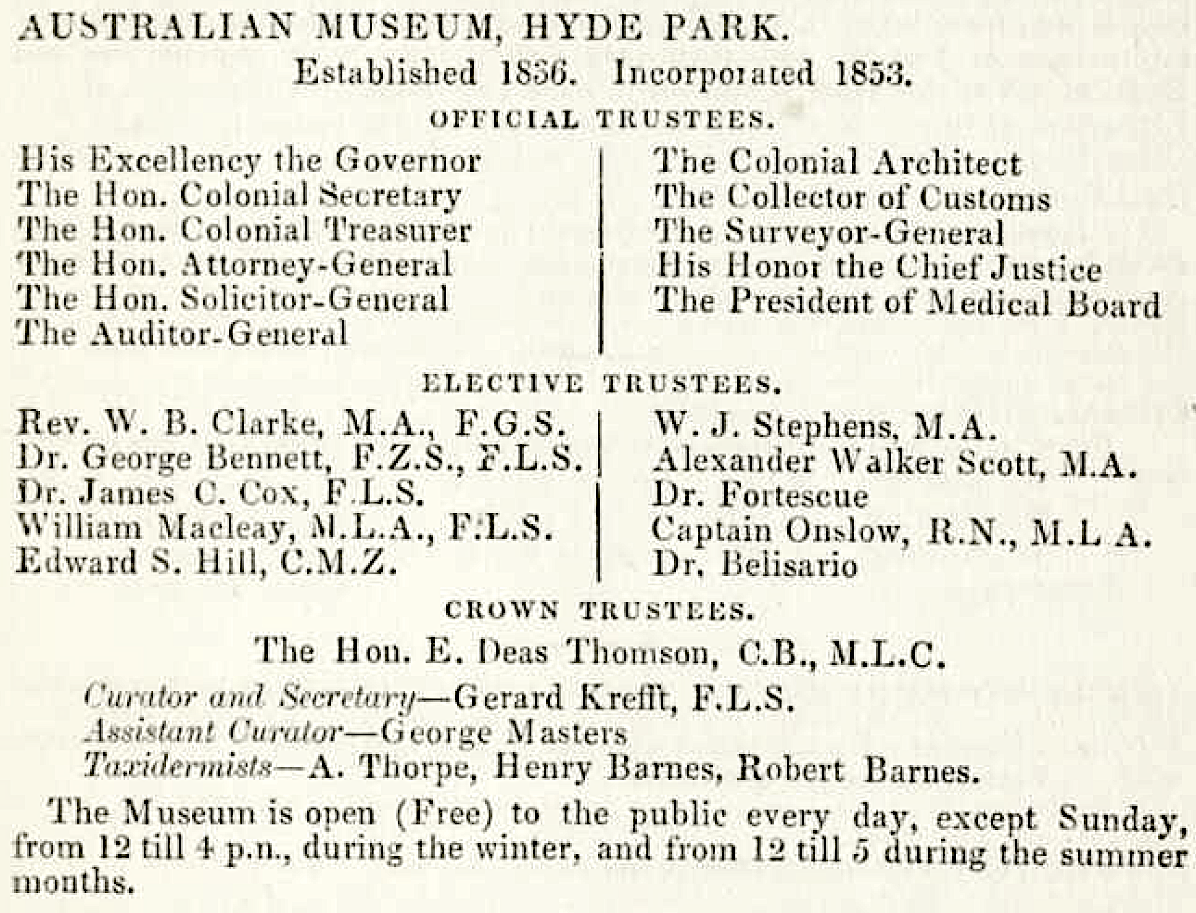
The Australian Museum's twelve ex officio trustees (including the Chief Justice, Attorney-General, and Treasurer), its ten elected trustees, and its administrative staff in 1874.

Hill's counsel, Sir William Manning, immediately applied for a rehearing of the action before the full court of three judges. The application was unanimously refused by Justices Martin, Faucett, and Hargrave, on the grounds that, because the Chief Justice, Sir James Martin, was a Museum trustee ex officio and, therefore, could not sit on the Bench, the opinions of the remaining two members, Faucett and Hargrave, had already been clearly expressed.

"When the courts awarded Krefft damages [in 1874], the trustees refused to pay up, though they had plundered the museum's coffers to recoup their own legal costs" (Macinnes, 2012, p. 114). In November 1877 Krefft sued the trustees for damages, and for the value of his medals and property detained by them, and was awarded £925. They offered to return his belongings with only £200.

=== Legislative proceedings ===
In 1876, with John Robertson (rather than Henry Parkes) as Premier, the New South Wales parliament passed a vote of £1,000 to be applied in satisfaction of Krefft's claims. The Government refused to pay unless Krefft renounced all other claims, which Krefft refused to do. In December 1876 Krefft failed in his attempt to have the Supreme Court In Banco force the Colonial Treasurer to make the legislated-for payment.

=== Insolvency ===
He was declared insolvent in 1880.

== Death ==
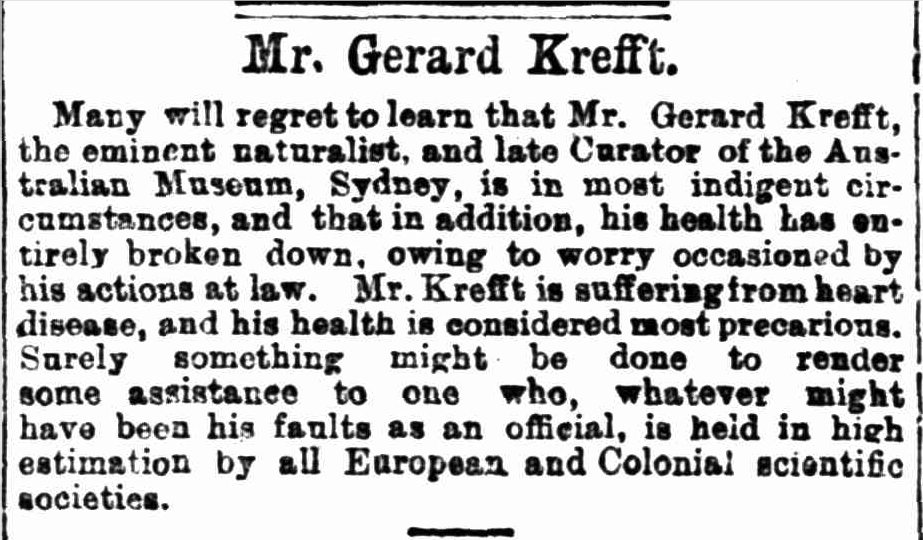
News Item, The (Sydney) Evening News, 19 January 1881.

Krefft failed to find new employment after his dismissal; "his reforms and discoveries were recognised by many of his contemporaries and remain on the record as important contributions to imperial and global science", and "[his] removal resulted in the impoverishment of the Natural sciences in New South Wales until the rise of inter-colonial science in the 1890s". His subsequent financial difficulties meant that he could not leave Australia, and "many of his research papers remained unpublished and his collections were damaged and muddled" (Rutledge & Whitley, 1974).

He died in Sydney, on 18 February 1881, at the age of 51, from congestion of the lungs, "after suffering for some months past from dropsy and Bright's disease", and was buried in the churchyard of St Jude's Church of England, Randwick.

== Research ==
- 1864: Published a Catalogue of Mammalia in the Collection of the Australian Museum.
- 1865: Published the pamphlet, Two Papers on the Vertebrata of the Lower Murray and Darling and on the Snakes of Sydney (1865a) — the two papers had been read before the Philosophical Society of New South Wales.
  The pamphlet also included a third paper on the Aborigines of the Lower Murray and Darling (i.e., Krefft, 1865b).
- 1869: The Snakes of Australia was published, which was the first definitive work on this group of Australian animals.
  In the absence of funds for its publication, Krefft eventually financed the publication himself, and it was published by the Government Printer. Krefft and his publication were praised at the Sydney Intercolonial Exhibition of 1870 and the Scott sisters, Helena Scott (a.k.a. Helena Forde) and Harriet Scott (a.k.a. Harriet Morgan), received a Very High Commendation for the striking artwork that accompanied Krefft's text.
- 1870: Published the first scientific description of the Queensland lungfish (Krefft, 1870a, 1870b, 1870c, 1870d, 1870e).
- 1871: Published The Mammals of Australia, which also included plates by the Scott sisters.
- 1872: Krefft was one of the few scientists supporting Darwinism in Australia during 1870s; and, as of May 1872, became a correspondent of Charles Darwin — see, for instance, Darwin's acknowledgement, in The Formation of Vegetable Mould Through the Action of Worms (Darwin, 1881, p. 122) of Krefft's contribution to his investigations.
- 1872: On 30 December 1872, Krefft wrote to Charles Darwin (1872d); and, based upon Krefft's direct, in-the-field experience as an anthropological linguist, informed Darwin that "Australian natives" could, indeed, count far beyond the number four — thus correcting Darwin's erroneous assertion that they could not (in Descent (1871a, p. 62), with Darwin apparently following Ludwig Büchner.
- 1873: Catalogue of the Minerals and Rocks in the Collection of the Australian Museum was published.
- 1877: Began publishing Krefft's Nature in Australia — see: item in the collection of the State Library of New South Wales — a popular journal for the discussion of questions of natural history, but it soon ceased publication.
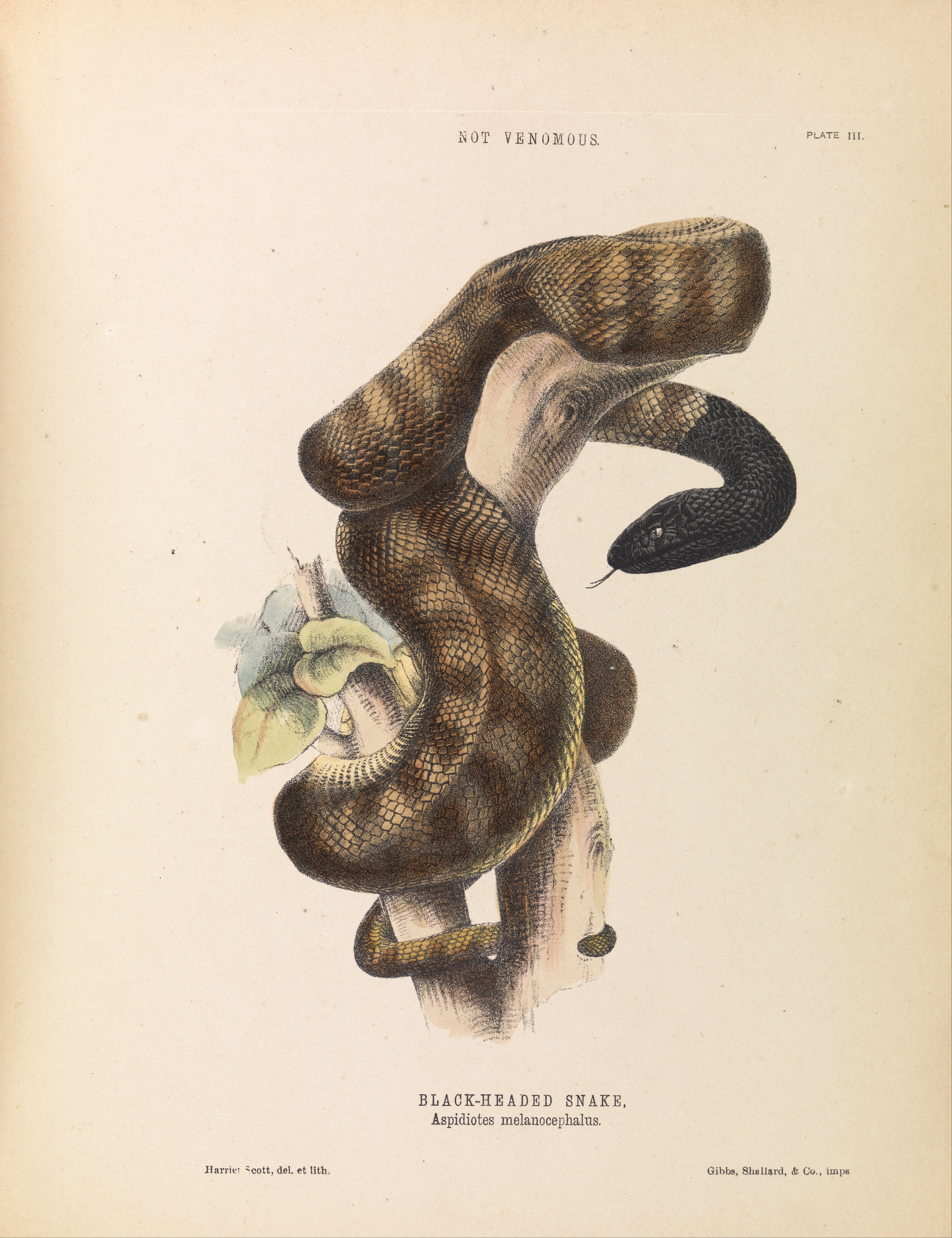
The Black-Headed Snake,
Aspidiotes melanocephalus,
illustration by Harriet Morgan,
from Krefft's The Snakes of Australia (1869).

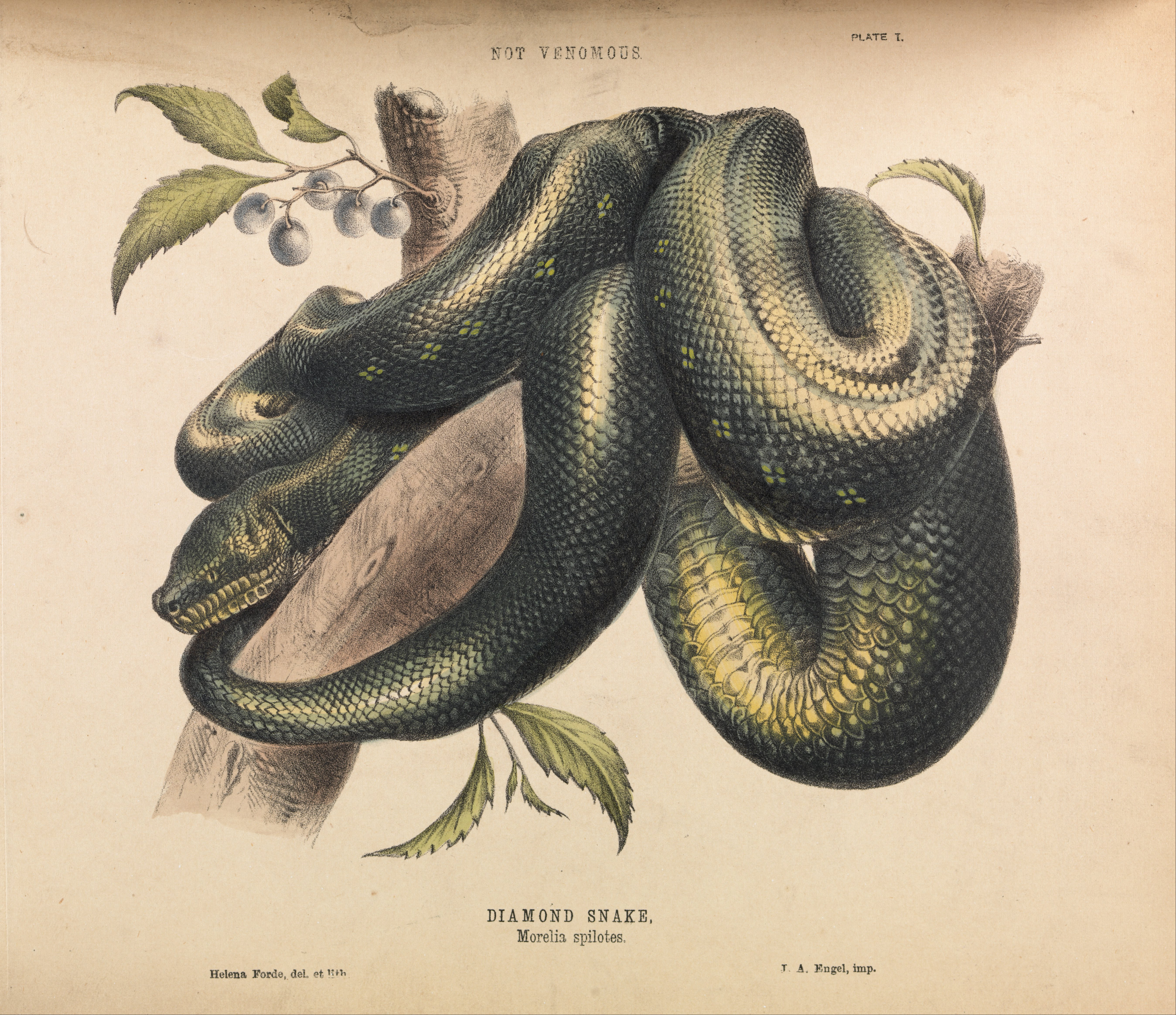
The Diamond Snake,
Morelia spilotes,
illustration by Helena Forde,
from Krefft's The Snakes of Australia (1869).

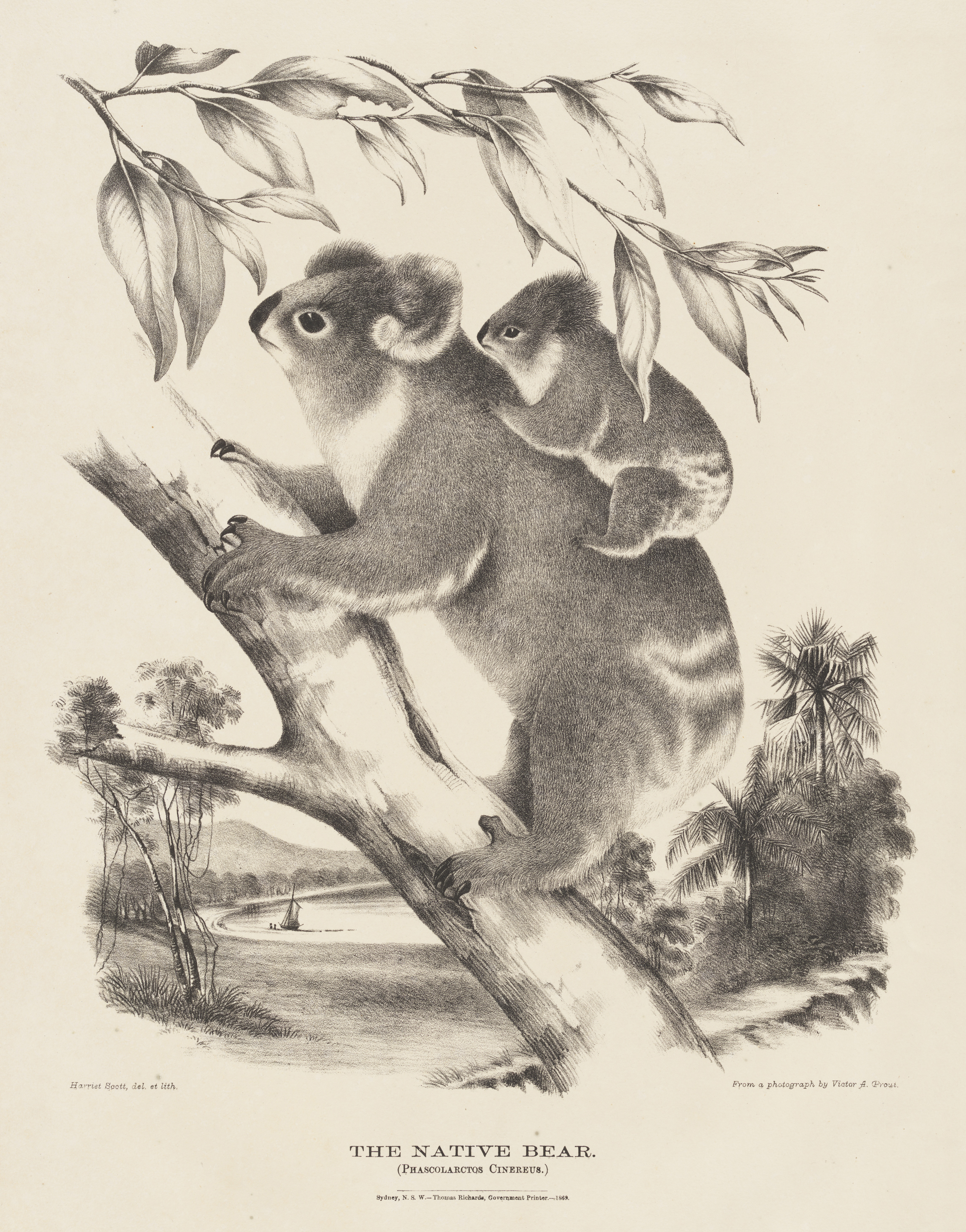
The Koala, or Native Bear,
Phascolarctos cinereus,
illustration by Harriet Morgan,
from Krefft's The Mammals of Australia (1871f).

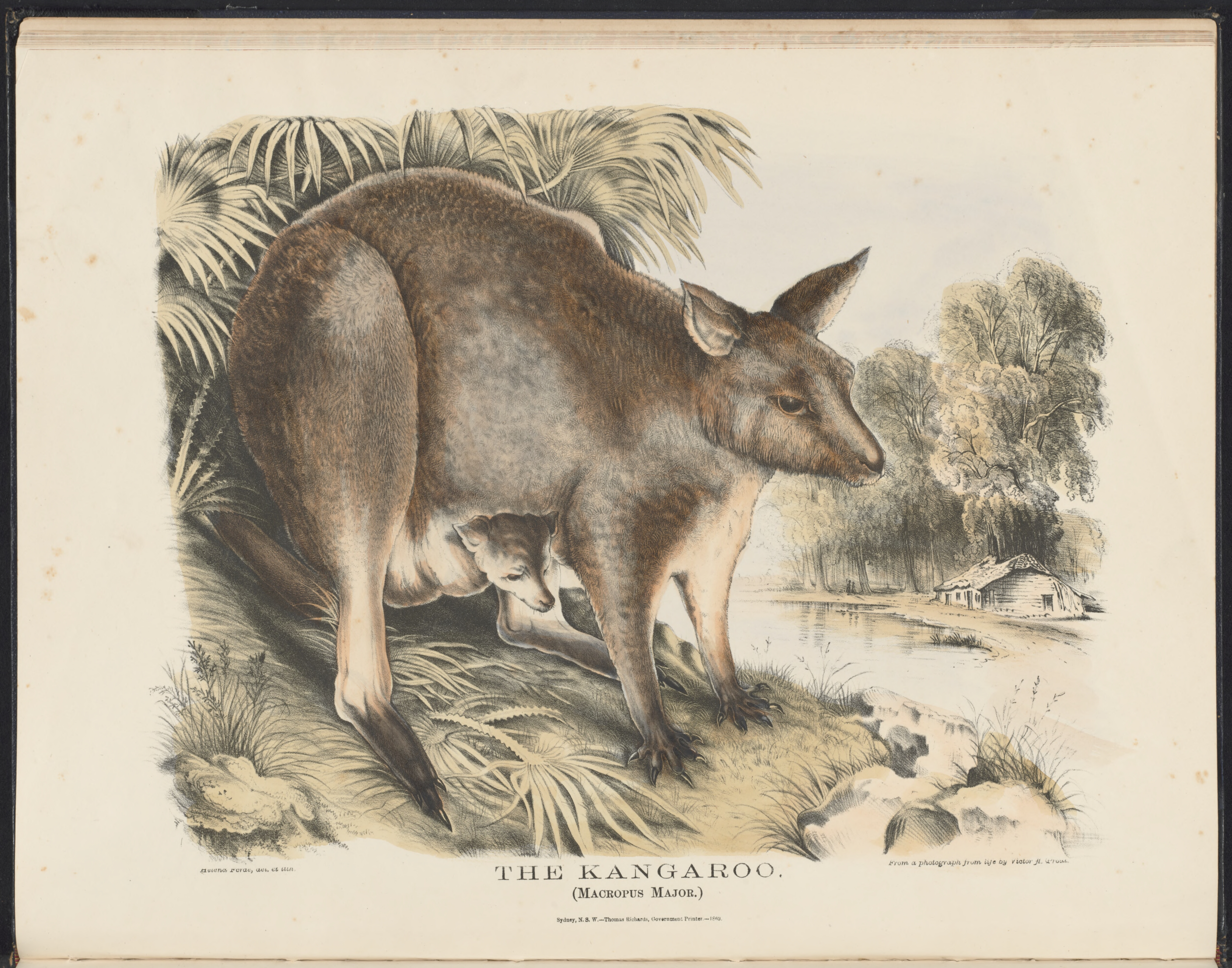
The Kangaroo,
Macropus major,
illustration by Helena Forde,
from Krefft's The Mammals of Australia (1871f).

== Learned Society affiliations; awards, etc. ==
=== Affiliations ===
Krefft was:

- A Fellow of the Linnean Society in London.
- A Master and Honorary Member of the Freies Deutsches Hochstift (Free German Foundation) at Frankfurt am Main.
- A Member of the Société Humanitaire et Scientifique du Sud-Ouest de la France (Humanitarian and Scientific Society of the Southwest of France), the Imperial and Royal Geological Society of Austro-Hungary in Vienna, the Royal Geographical Society of Dresden; Royal Society of New South Wales, and the Royal Society of Tasmania.
- A Corresponding Member of the Zoological Society of London, the Société Humanitaire et Scientifique de Sud-Ouest de France of Bordeaux, the Senckenberg Nature Research Society of Frankfurt am Main, and the "Society of Scientific Naturalists in Hamburg".

=== Awards ===
- In 1869, the Cross of the Order of the Crown of Italy was conferred upon Krefft by Victor Emmanuel II, "in token of his Majesty's appreciation of Mr. Krefft's services in the cause of science".
- He received a gold medal from the Government of New South Wales "for services rendered".
- He held "a silver medal for exhibits from the Emperor of the French, and ... various other silver and bronze medals awarded in the colony".
- He was awarded "the honorary degree of Doctor of Philosophy".

== Legacy ==
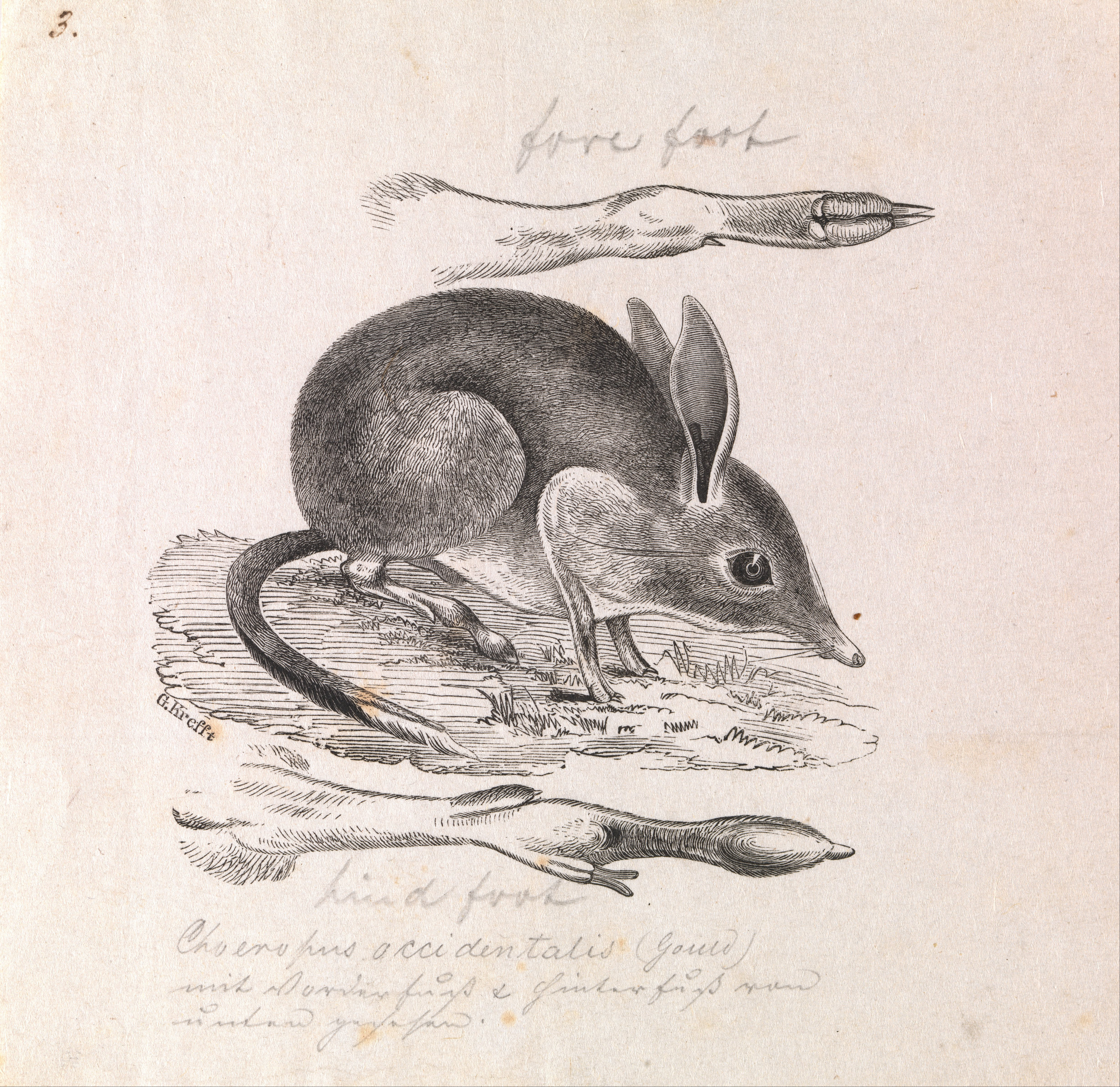
Southern Pig-Footed Bandicoot (Chaeropus ecaudatus (Gould)): by Gerard Krefft (1857).

The Krefftberget, in the extreme southwestern part of Barents Island, Svalbard archipelago, Norway

His natural science expertise was often sought on unusual matters. In May 1870, for instance, he appeared as an expert witness in a case of infanticide (prosecution, J.E. Salomons; defence, W.B. Dalley) wherein Krefft testified that a set of exhumed bones were from "a human skeleton".

Apart from his scientific contributions, Krefft is remembered for the demonstration he provided at the Australian Museum, on 14 February 1868, for Prince Alfred — at the time, the Duke of Edinburg and, later, the Duke of Saxe-Coburg and Gotha — involving Henry Parkes' pet mongoose killing several snakes. The mongoose was subsequently presented to the Prince who took it with him when he left Australia on HMS Galatea in May 1868.

He is also renowned for having eaten what may well have been the last extant specimens of the (now extinct) Eastern Chæropus (Chæropus occidentalis) — then also known as Chaeropus ecaudatus (Gould)— whilst on the (1856/1857) Blandowski Expedition: "They are very good eating, and I am sorry to confess that my appetite more than once over-ruled my love for science" (Krefft, 1865a, p. 14).

Krefft ... is the only person known to have kept the pig-footed bandicoot Chaeropus ecaudatus in captivity and his observations [viz., at Krefft, 1865a, pp. 12–14] are virtually the only natural history notes on this animal. Krefft's illustration of C. ecaudatus far surpasses the illustration presented in Gould's Mammals of Australia in capturing the essence of the animal, not least because it was drawn from life rather than from a stuffed skin.—Menkhorst (2009), p. 65.

- In 1870 Krefft published the first scientific description of the Queensland lungfish (Krefft, 1870a, 1870b, 1870c, 1870d, 1870e).
- He is honoured in the scientific names of two reptiles endemic to Australia:
  - Dwarf crowned snake (Cacophis krefftii, (Günther, 1863)), a species of venomous snake.
  - Emydura macquarii krefftii, a subspecies of freshwater turtle.
- Other fauna also named after him:
  - Freshwater longtom (Strongylura krefftii), is a species of euryhaline needlefish.
  - Krefft's darter (Telicota augias krefftii), a butterfly of the family Hesperiidae, found in the north of Australia.
  - Krefft's glider (Petaurus notatus), whose type specimen Krefft collected, was also named after him.
  - Long-tailed myna (Mino kreffti), a member of the starling family.
  - Northern hairy-nosed wombat (Lasiorhinus krefftii).
  - San Cristobal treefrog (Papurana kreffti).
  - Snub-nosed garfish (Arrhamphus krefftii)
- The mountain group of Krefftberget in the extreme southwestern part of Barents Island, Svalbard, Norway, was named after him in August 1870, by the Austrian explorer Theodor von Heuglin.
- Krefft Street, in Florey, Australian Capital Territory is named after him.

== See also ==
- Category:Taxa named by Gerard Krefft
- Darwin's category of "Living Fossils"

== Notes ==
Government offices
Preceded by —	Assistant Curator, The Australian Museum, Sydney, New South Wales; 1860–1864	Succeeded by George Masters (1864–1874)
Preceded by Simon Rood Pittard (1859–1861)	Acting Curator, The Australian Museum, Sydney, New South Wales; 1861–1864	Succeeded by —
Preceded by Simon Rood Pittard (1859–1861)	Curator, The Australian Museum, Sydney, New South Wales; 1864–1874	Succeeded by Edward Pierson Ramsay (1874–1895)
