= Members of the New South Wales Legislative Assembly, 1856–1858 =

Members of the New South Wales Legislative Assembly who served in the first parliament of New South Wales held their seats from 1856 to 1858. (Note: The First Parliament was actually dissolved in December 1857, and the next election held in January–February 1858. For the purposes of this list, members who served until the end of the First Parliament are said to have served until 1858, to distinguish them from those who left the parliament prior to this.) The Speaker was Sir Daniel Cooper.

Name	Electorate	Years in office
William Arnold	Durham	1856–1875
Thomas Barker	Gloucester and Macquarie	1856–1858
William Bowman	Cumberland Boroughs	1856–1858
Ryan Brenan (Note: Elias Weekes was originally elected as the member for Cumberland (South Riding). However, he had also contested Northumberland Boroughs, and when Bourn Russell's election was voided, Weekes became member for that seat as well. He chose to sit as the member for Northumberland Boroughs. In the by-election for Cumberland (South Riding) on 21 August 1856, Ryan Brenan was elected.) (Note: The election of Ryan Brenan to Cumberland (South Riding) was voided, and in the resulting by-election on 7 November 1856, Stuart Donaldson was elected unopposed.)	Cumberland (South Riding)	1856
Henry Buckley	Stanley County	1856–1859
James Byrnes (Note: Cumberland (South Riding) MLA William Manning resigned on 18 May 1857. In the resulting by-election on 12 June 1857, James Byrnes was elected.)	Cumberland (South Riding)	1857–1861, 1864–1872
John Campbell (Note: Former Premier Stuart Donaldson was required to recontest Sydney Hamlets when appointed to the ministry. In the by-election on 10 October 1856, he was defeated by John Campbell.)	Sydney Hamlets	1856–1860
Robert Campbell	Sydney City	1856–1859
Sir Daniel Cooper	Sydney Hamlets	1856–1860
Charles Cowper	Sydney City	1856–1859, 1860–1867, 1869–1870
George Cox	Wellington (County)	1856–1859
William Dalley (Note: Henry Parkes resigned as member for Sydney City on 19 December 1856 following financial difficulties relating to his newspaper. In the resulting by-election on 29 December 1856, William Dalley was elected.)	Sydney City	1856–1857, 1858–1860, 1862–1864
John Darvall (Note: Cumberland (North Riding) MLA John Darvall resigned on 26 November 1857. In the resulting by-election on 11 December 1857, Thomas Smith was elected.)	Cumberland (North Riding)	1856–1857, 1859–1860, 1863–1865
Daniel Deniehy (Note: Argyle MLA John Plunkett was appointed to the Legislative Council on 27 January 1857. In the resulting by-election on 17 February 1857, Daniel Deniehy was elected.)	Argyle	1857–1859, 1860
James Dickson (Note: Northumberland Boroughs MLA Bob Nichols died on 12 September 1857. In the resulting by-election on 6 November 1857, James Dickson was elected.)	Northumberland Boroughs	1857–1859, 1859–1863
Stuart Donaldson	Sydney Hamlets, Cumberland (South Riding)	1856, 1856–1859
Daniel Egan	Maneroo	1856–1869, 1870
Peter Faucett	King and Georgiana	1856–1859, 1860, 1861–1865
Edward Flood	North Eastern Boroughs	1856–1860, 1869–1872
William Forster	United Counties of Murray and St Vincent	1856–1860, 1861–1864, 1864–1869, 1869–1874, 1875–1876, 1880–1882
James Garland	Lachlan and Lower Darling	1856–1858
Samuel Gordon	Durham	1856–1859, 1859–1860
Richard Hargrave	New England and Macleay	1856–1858
John Hay	Murrumbidgee	1856–1867
Hovenden Hely	Northumberland and Hunter	1856–1858
Arthur Holroyd	Western Boroughs	1856–1858 , 1861–1864
Thomas Holt	Stanley Boroughs	1856–1858 , 1861–1864
Clark Irving	Clarence and Darling Downs	1856–1858 , 1859–1864
Robert Jamison	Cook and Westmoreland	1856–1860
Richard Jones	Durham	1856–1860
Gideon Lang	Liverpool Plains and Gwydir	1856–1858
William Lee	Roxburgh	1856–1859
Patrick Leslie (Note: Moreton, Wide Bay, Burnett and Maranoa MLA Gordon Sandeman resigned on 10 October 1857. In the resulting by-election on 17 December 1857, Patrick Leslie was elected.)	Moreton, Wide Bay, Burnett and Maranoa	1857–1858
George Lord	Wellington and Bligh	1856–1877
James Macarthur (Note: Western Division of Camden MLA James Macarthur resigned over to what he believed to be unconstitutional election. At the resulting by-election he was elected unopposed.)	Western Division of Camden	1856, 1856–1859
George Macleay	Murrumbidgee	1856–1859
William Macleay	Lachlan and Lower Darling	1856–1874
William Manning	Cumberland (South Riding)	1856–1857
John Marks	Eastern Division of Camden	1856–1859
James Martin	Cook and Westmoreland	1856–1860, 1862–1863, 1863–1864, 1864–1872, 1872–1873
Terence Murray	Southern Boroughs	1856–1862
Bob Nichols	Northumberland Boroughs	1856–1857
George Oakes	Parramatta	1856–1860, 1872–1874
Henry Osborne	Eastern Division of Camden	1856–1858
John Oxley	Western Division of Camden	1856–1858
Henry Parker	Parramatta	1856–1858
Henry Parkes	Sydney City	1856, 1858, 1859–1861, 1864–1870, 1870, 1872–1877, 1877–1882, 1882–1884, 1885–1887, 1887–1895
William Piddington	Northumberland and Hunter	1856–1877
John Plunkett (Note: John Plunkett was elected as the member for both Argyle and Bathurst County. After attempting to represent both electorates in the Assembly, he resigned as the member for Bathurst County and sat as the member for Argyle. In the resulting by-election on 19 June 1856, William Suttor was elected.)	Argyle, Bathurst County	1856–1857, 1858–1860
James Pye	Cumberland (North Riding)	1856–1858
John Richardson	Stanley Boroughs	1856–1859
John Robertson	Phillip, Brisbane and Bligh	1856–1861, 1862–1865, 1865–1866, 1866–1870, 1870–1877, 1877–1878, 1882–1886
Francis Rusden	Liverpool Plains and Gwydir	1856–1858 , 1860–1864
Thomas Rusden	New England and Macleay	1856–1858
Bourn Russell	Northumberland Boroughs	1856
Gordon Sandeman	Moreton, Wide Bay, Burnett and Maranoa	1856–1857
Alexander Scott	Northumberland and Hunter	1856–1860, 1860–1861
Thomas Smith	Cumberland (North Riding)	1857–1859
William Suttor	Bathurst County	1856–1859, 1860–1864, 1866–1872
James Thompson	St Vincent	1856–1858
Elias Weekes	Cumberland (South Riding), Northumberland Boroughs	1856–1864
James Wilshire	Sydney City	1856–1858

== See also ==
- Donaldson ministry
- First Cowper ministry
- Parker ministry
- Second Cowper ministry
- Results of the 1856 New South Wales colonial election
- Candidates of the 1856 New South Wales colonial election

== Notes ==
There was no party system in New South Wales politics until 1887. Under the constitution, ministers were required to resign to recontest their seats in a by-election when appointed. These by-elections are only noted when the minister was defeated; in general, he was elected unopposed.
