= Results of the 1856 New South Wales colonial election =

Colonial election for New South Wales, Australia in 1856

The 1856 New South Wales colonial election was to return 54 members of Legislative Assembly composed of 34 electoral districts with 18 returning 1 member, 13 returning 2 members, two returning 3 members and one returning 4 members, all with a first past the post system. In multi-member districts, because each voter could cast more than one vote, it is not possible to total the votes to show the number of voters and voter turnout in these districts is estimated. 8 members from 6 districts were returned unopposed.

== Results by district ==
=== Argyle ===
1856 New South Wales colonial election: Argyle
Candidate	Votes	%
John Plunkett (elected)	182	52.9
John Chisholm	162	47.1
Columbus Fitzpatrick	0	0.0
Total formal votes	344	100.0
Informal votes	0	0.0
Turnout	344	64.4

Polling was conducted on 31 March 1856. Plunkett served in the old Legislative Council as an appointed member. After failed attempts to win election for Sydney City and North Eastern Boroughs, Plunkett was elected to represent Bathurst (County) on the same day as winning Argyle. After attending the first sitting of Parliament representing both seats, and even attempting to use both votes in the ballot for Speaker, Plunkett resigned as MP for Bathurst (County) and represented Argyle. Sitting Legislative Councillor for County of Argyle was Charles Nicholson who did not contest the election.

=== Bathurst (County) ===
1856 New South Wales colonial election: Bathurst (County)
Candidate	Votes	%
John Plunkett (elected)	210	54.0
James Bligh	179	46.0
Total formal votes	389	100.0
Informal votes	0	0.0
Turnout	389	54.6

Polling was conducted on 31 March 1856. Both Bligh and Plunkett had served in the old Legislative Council, Bligh representing County of Bathurst and Plunkett as an appointed member. After failed attempts to win election for Sydney City and North Eastern Boroughs, Plunkett was elected to represent Argyle on the same day as winning Bathurst (County). After signing the attendance book at the first sitting as a representative of both seats, and even attempting to vote twice in the ballot for Speaker, he chose to represent Argyle and resigned as member for Bathurst (County).

=== Clarence and Darling Downs ===
1856 New South Wales colonial election: Clarence and Darling Downs
Candidate	Votes	%
Clark Irving (elected)	193	65.9
Colin McKenzie	100	34.1
Total formal votes	293	100.0
Informal votes	0	0.0
Turnout	293	46.1

Polling was conducted on 15 April 1856. Sitting Legislative Councillor for Pastoral Districts of Clarence and Darling Downs was Thomas Hood who did not contest the election but was appointed to the new Legislative Council.

=== Cook and Westmoreland ===
1856 New South Wales colonial election: Cook and Westmoreland
Candidate	Votes	%
James Martin (elected 1)	321	39.5
Robert Jamison (elected 2)	303	37.3
John Arkins	189	23.3
Total formal votes	813	100.0
Informal votes	0	0.0
Turnout	487	54.4

Polling was conducted on 4 April 1856. Martin represented Counties of Cook and Westmoreland in the old Legislative Council.

=== Cumberland Boroughs ===
1856 New South Wales colonial election: Cumberland Boroughs
Candidate	Votes	%
William Bowman (elected)	129	28.2
Ralph Robey	124	27.1
William Redman	115	25.1
Robert Ross	90	19.7
Total formal votes	458	100.0
Informal votes	0	0.0
Turnout	458	65.9

Polling was conducted on 8 April 1856. Bowman represented this seat in the old Legislative Council.

=== Cumberland (North Riding) ===
1856 New South Wales colonial election: Cumberland (North Riding)
Candidate	Votes	%
John Darvall (elected 1)	442	28.7
James Pye (elected 2)	401	26.1
William Sherwin	376	24.4
Patrick Hogan	319	20.7
Robert Fitzgerald	1	0.06
Total formal votes	1,539	100.0
Informal votes	0	0.0
Turnout	849	45.7

Polling was conducted on 4 April 1856. Both Darvall and Fitzgerald represented the County of Cumberland in the old Legislative Council.

=== Cumberland (South Riding) ===
1856 New South Wales colonial election: Cumberland (South Riding)
Candidate	Votes	%
William Manning (elected 1)	833	38.7
Elias Weekes (elected 2)	576	26.8
Ryan Brenan	521	24.2
William Russell	220	10.2
Total formal votes	2,150	100.0
Informal votes	0	0.0
Turnout	1,242	45.2

Polling was conducted on 9 April 1856. Manning had served in the old Legislative Council as an appointed member. Unlike other newly appointed Ministers, he did not have to resign and contest a ministerial by-election as he already held the office of Solicitor-General at the time of his election. Weekes was elected, but later won an appeal against his defeat in Northumberland Boroughs, choosing to sit for that seat and resign from this seat. The subsequent by-election was won by Brenan.

=== Durham ===
1856 New South Wales colonial election: Durham
Candidate	Votes	%
Richard Jones (elected 1)	660	30.7
Samuel Gordon (elected 2)	550	25.6
William Arnold (elected 3)	380	17.7
Andrew Lang	349	16.3
Alexander Park	209	9.7
Total formal votes	2,148	100.0
Informal votes	0	0.0
Turnout	842	58.51

Polling was conducted on 7 April 1856. Park had represented County of Durham in the old Legislative Council, while another representative in Charles Cowper contested Sydney City.

=== Eastern Division of Camden ===
1856 New South Wales colonial election: Eastern Division of Camden
Candidate	Votes	%
Henry Osborne (elected 1)	657	33.5
John Marks (elected 2)	502	25.6
Charles Jenkins	398	20.3
George Pickering	176	9.0
David L. Waugh	136	7.0
James Shoobert	91	4.6
Total formal votes	1,960	100.0
Informal votes	0	0.0
Turnout	980	66.3

Polling was conducted on 31 March 1856. Osborne had represented this district in the old Legislative Council.

=== Gloucester and Macquarie ===
1856 New South Wales colonial election: Gloucester and Macquarie
Candidate	Votes	%
Thomas Barker (elected)	163	37.7
James Williamson	139	32.18
Joseph Andrews	130	30.1
Total formal votes	432	100.0
Informal votes	0	0.0
Turnout	432	41.30

Polling was conducted on 10 April 1856. Barker served in the old Legislative Council as an appointed member. Sitting Legislative Councillor for Counties of Gloucester and Macquarie was Phillip Parker King who did not contest the election.

=== King and Georgiana ===
1856 New South Wales colonial election: King and Georgiana
Candidate	Votes	%
Peter Faucett (elected)	199	71.6
Isaac Shepherd	79	28.4
Total formal votes	278	100.0
Informal votes	0	0.0
Turnout	278	43.9

Polling was conducted on 7 April 1856. James Chisholm, the member of the Legislative Council for Counties of King and Georgiana, did not contest the election.

=== Lachlan and Lower Darling ===
1856 New South Wales colonial election: Lachlan and Lower Darling
Candidate	Votes	%
James Garland (elected 1)	134	37.6
William Macleay (elected 2)	129	36.2
John Hardy	63	17.7
Daniel Henry Thorn	30	8.4
Total formal votes	356	100.0
Informal votes	0	0.0
Turnout	182	49.32

Polling was conducted on 19 April 1856. Macleay had represented Pastoral Districts of Lachlan and Lower Darling in the old Legislative Council.

=== Liverpool Plains and Gwydir ===
1856 New South Wales colonial election: Liverpool Plains and Gwydir
Candidate	Votes	%
Gideon Lang (elected 1)	152	45.9
Francis Rusden (elected 2)	108	32.6
Augustus Morris	71	21.5
Total formal votes	331	100.0
Informal votes	0	0.0
Turnout	184	33.3

Polling was conducted on 16 April 1856. Morris had represented Pastoral Districts of Liverpool Plains and Gwydir in the old Legislative Council.

=== Maneroo ===
1856 New South Wales colonial election: Maneroo
Candidate	Votes	%
Daniel Egan (elected)	unopposed	

Polling was scheduled to be conducted on 16 April 1856. Egan had represented Pastoral District of Maneroo in the old Legislative Council.

=== Moreton, Wide Bay, Burnett and Maranoa ===
1856 New South Wales colonial election: Moreton, Wide Bay, Burnett and Maranoa
Candidate	Votes	%
Gordon Sandeman (elected)	unopposed	

Polling was scheduled to be conducted on 17 April 1856. Sitting Legislative Councillor for Pastoral Districts of Moreton, Wide Bay, Burnett, and Maranoa was Richard Joseph Smith who did not contest the election.

=== Murrumbidgee ===
1856 New South Wales colonial election: Murrumbidgee
Candidate	Votes	%
George Macleay (elected)	unopposed	
John Hay (elected)	unopposed	

Polling was scheduled to be conducted on 16 April 1856. Macleay represented Pastoral District of Murrumbidgee in the old Legislative Council.

=== New England and Macleay ===
1856 New South Wales colonial election: New England and Macleay
Candidate	Votes	%
Thomas Rusden (elected 1)	181	46.9
Richard Hargrave (elected 2)	162	42.0
John Dickson	43	11.1
Total formal votes	386	100.0
Informal votes	0	0.0
Turnout	193	41.87

Polling was conducted on 17 April 1856. Rusden had represented Pastoral Districts of New England and Macleay in the old Legislative Council.

=== North Eastern Boroughs ===
1856 New South Wales colonial election: North Eastern Boroughs
Candidate	Votes	%
Edward Flood (elected)	138	66.0
John Plunkett	71	34.0
Total formal votes	209	100.0
Informal votes	0	0.0
Turnout	209	58.7

Polling was conducted on 29 March 1856. Both Flood and Plunkett had served in the old Legislative Council, Flood representing this district and Plunkett as an appointed member. Plunkett had earlier contested Sydney City and was unsuccessful. After his defeat in this seat, Plunkett contested both Argyle and Bathurst (County).

=== Northumberland and Hunter ===
1856 New South Wales colonial election: Northumberland and Hunter
Candidate	Votes	%
Alexander Walker Scott (elected 1)	821	27.1
William Piddington (elected 2)	706	23.3
Hovenden Hely (elected 3)	574	19.0
Henry Douglass	389	12.8
George Bowman	289	9.5
Walter Rotton	250	8.3
Total formal votes	3,029	100.0
Informal votes	0	0.0
Turnout	1,180	50.7

Polling was conducted on 17 April 1856. Both Bowman and Douglass had represented Counties of Northumberland and Hunter in the old Legislative Council. John Plunkett was nominated to stand in this seat but after being elected to both Argyle and Bathurst (County) on 31 March, he withdrew his nomination.

=== Northumberland Boroughs ===
1856 New South Wales colonial election: Northumberland Boroughs
Candidate	Votes	%
Bob Nichols (elected 1)	660	39.0
Bourn Russell (elected 2)	521	30.8
Elias Weekes	513	30.3
Total formal votes	1,694	100.0
Informal votes	0	0.0
Turnout	1,034	62.4

Polling was conducted on 28 March 1856. Nichols represented this district in the old Legislative Council. Committee of Elections and Qualifications conducted a re-count and overturned the election of Bourn Russell and declared that Elias Weekes had been elected.

=== Parramatta ===
1856 New South Wales colonial election: Parramatta
Candidate	Votes	%
Henry Parker (elected 1)	310	30.2
George Oakes (elected 2)	303	29.5
James Byrnes	222	21.6
Andrew Murray	191	18.6
Total formal votes	1,026	100.0
Informal votes	0	0.0
Turnout	550	72.7

Polling was conducted on 29 March 1856. Both Parker and Oakes had served in the old Legislative Council, Oakes representing Town of Parramatta and Parker as an appointed member.

=== Phillip, Brisbane and Bligh ===
1856 New South Wales colonial election: Phillip, Brisbane and Bligh
Candidate	Votes	%
John Robertson (elected)	169	74.1
Joseph Docker	59	25.9
Total formal votes	228	100.0
Informal votes	0	0.0
Turnout	228	53.3

Polling was conducted on 11 April 1856. William Dumaresq, the sitting Legislative Councillor for Counties of Phillip, Brisbane and Bligh, did not contest the election.

=== Roxburgh ===
1856 New South Wales colonial election: Roxburgh
Candidate	Votes	%
William Lee (elected)	136	44.2
William Suttor	114	37.0
William Cummings	58	18.8
Total formal votes	308	100.0
Informal votes	0	0.0
Turnout	308	43.8

Polling was conducted on 8 April 1856. Suttor had served in the old Legislative Council as the elected member for Counties of Roxburgh, Phillip and Wellington from 1843 to 1851, then as the elected member for Counties of Roxburgh and Wellington from 1851 to 1854. The sitting Legislative Councillor, Saul Samuel contested Wellington (County).

=== St Vincent ===
1856 New South Wales colonial election: St Vincent
Candidate	Votes	%
James Thompson (elected)	158	35.8
Richard Sadleir	149	33.7
William Roberts	135	30.5
Total formal votes	442	100.0
Informal votes	0	0.0
Turnout	442	74.9

Polling was conducted on 10 April 1856. Sitting Legislative Councillor for Counties of Murray and St Vincent, Daniel Cooper contested Sydney Hamlets.

=== Southern Boroughs ===
1856 New South Wales colonial election: Southern Boroughs
Candidate	Votes	%
Terence Murray (elected)	unopposed	

Polling was scheduled to be conducted on 4 April 1856. Murray had represented this district in the old Legislative Council.

=== Stanley Boroughs ===
1856 New South Wales colonial election: Stanley Boroughs
Candidate	Votes	%
Thomas Holt (elected 1)	320	32.6
John Richardson (elected 2)	316	32.2
Arthur Macalister	179	18.2
Frederick Forbes	167	17.0
Total formal votes	983	100.0
Informal votes	0	0.0
Turnout	627	50.4

Polling was conducted on 7 April 1856. Richardson had represented this district in the old Legislative Council.

=== Stanley County ===
1856 New South Wales colonial election: Stanley County
Candidate	Votes	%
Henry Buckley (elected)	304	74.3
William Dorsey	105	25.7
Total formal votes	409	100.0
Informal votes	0	0.0
Turnout	409	52.3

Polling was conducted on 9 April 1856. Sitting Legislative Councillor for County of Stanley was John Dunmore Lang who did not contest the election.

=== Sydney City ===
1856 New South Wales colonial election: Sydney City
Candidate	Votes	%
Charles Cowper (elected 1)	3,073	20.5
Henry Parkes (elected 2)	3,057	20.4
Robert Campbell (elected 3)	3,041	20.33
James Wilshire (elected 4)	2,901	19.4
John Plunkett	2,800	18.7
Thomas Duigan	89	0.6
Total formal votes	14,961	100.0
Informal votes	0	0.0
Turnout	6,007	43.3

Cowper, Parkes, Campbell and Wilshire had been endorsed as a group by a public meeting to be elected to the four vacancies. Parkes, Campbell and Wilshire all represented City of Sydney in the Legislative Council while Cowper represented County of Durham. There were no political parties at the time and the combination of candidates, pejoratively referred to by Plunkett as "The Bunch", was controversial. Plunket, who had been an appointed member of the Council, campaigned on the slogan "plump for Plunket", a reference to the voting practice of voting for a single candidate rather than the four candidates an elector was entitled to vote for.

After his defeat in this seat, Plunkett unsuccessfully contested North Eastern Boroughs, before being elected for both Argyle and Bathurst (County). Plunket chose to represent Argyle and resigned as member for Bathurst (County).

=== Sydney Hamlets ===
1856 New South Wales colonial election: Sydney Hamlets
Candidate	Votes	%
Daniel Cooper (elected 1)	867	40.9
Stuart Donaldson (elected 2)	688	32.5
Richard Driver	415	19.6
Merion Moriarty	150	7.1
Total formal votes	2,120	100.0
Informal votes	0	0.0
Turnout	2,120	39.8

Polling was conducted on 11 March 1856. Both Donaldson and Cooper served in the old Legislative Council, Donaldson representing Sydney Hamlets and Cooper Murray and St Vincent.

=== United Counties of Murray and St Vincent ===
1856 New South Wales colonial election: United Counties of Murray and St Vincent
Candidate	Votes	%
William Forster (elected)	unopposed	

Polling was scheduled to be conducted on 5 April 1856. Sitting Legislative Councillor for Counties of Murray and St Vincent, Daniel Cooper contested Sydney Hamlets.

=== Wellington and Bligh ===
1856 New South Wales colonial election: Wellington and Bligh
Candidate	Votes	%
George Lord (elected)	28	100.0
William Buchanan	0	0.0
Total formal votes	28	100.0
Informal votes	0	0.0
Turnout	28	9.5

Polling was conducted on 16 April 1856. Sitting Legislative Councillor for this district Charles Wray Finch did not contest the election.

=== Wellington (County) ===
1856 New South Wales colonial election: Wellington (County)
Candidate	Votes	%
George Cox (elected)	191	63.2
Saul Samuel	111	36.6
Total formal votes	302	100.0
Informal votes	0	0.0
Turnout	302	50.9

Polling was conducted on 10 April 1856. Samuel represented Counties of Roxburgh and Wellington in the old Legislative Council.

=== Western Boroughs ===
1856 New South Wales colonial election: Western Boroughs
Candidate	Votes	%
Arthur Holroyd (elected)	283	66.0
James Byrnes	146	34.0
Total formal votes	429	100.0
Informal votes	0	0.0
Turnout	429	55.7

Polling was conducted on 29 March 1856. Holroyd had represented this district in the old Legislative Council.

=== Western Division of Camden ===
1856 New South Wales colonial election: Western Division of Camden
Candidate	Votes	%
John Oxley (elected)	unopposed	
James Macarthur (elected)	unopposed	

Polling was scheduled to be conducted on 31 March 1856. Macarthur had represented this district in the old Legislative Council.

== See also ==
- Members of the New South Wales Legislative Assembly, 1856–1858
- Candidates of the 1856 New South Wales colonial election
