= Candidates of the 1856 New South Wales colonial election =

This is a list of candidates for the 1856 New South Wales colonial election. The election was held from 11 March to 19 April 1856.

There was no recognisable party structure at this election. This was the first election after the introduction of self-government to the colony.

== Legislative Assembly ==
Successful candidates are highlighted.

Electorates are arranged chronologically from the day the poll was held.

Electorate	Successful candidates	Unsuccessful candidates
Tuesday 11 March 1856
Sydney Hamlets	Daniel Cooper; Stuart Donaldson	Richard Driver; Merion Moriarty
Thursday 13 March 1856
Sydney City	Robert Campbell; Charles Cowper; Henry Parkes; James Wilshire	Thomas Duigan; John Plunkett
Friday 28 March 1856
Northumberland Boroughs	Bob Nichols; Bourn Russell	Elias Weekes
Saturday 29 March 1856
North-Eastern Boroughs	Edward Flood	John Plunkett
Parramatta	George Oakes; Henry Parker	James Byrnes; Andrew Murray
Western Boroughs	Arthur Holroyd	James Byrnes
Monday 31 March 1856
Argyle	John Plunkett	John Chisholm; Columbus Fitzpatrick
Bathurst County	John Plunkett	James Bligh
Eastern Division of Camden	John Marks; Henry Osborne	Charles Jenkins; George Pickering; James Shoobert; David Waugh
Western Division of Camden	James Macarthur; John Oxley	
Friday 4 April 1856
Cook and Westmoreland	Robert Jamison; James Martin	John Arkins
Cumberland (North Riding)	John Darvall; James Pye	Robert Fitzgerald; Patrick Hogan; William Sherwin
Southern Boroughs	Terence Murray	
Saturday 5 April 1856
Murray and St Vincent	William Forster	
Monday 7 April 1856
Durham	William Arnold; Samuel Gordon; Richard Jones	Andrew Lang; Alexander Park
King and Georgiana	Peter Faucett	Isaac Shepherd
Stanley Boroughs	Thomas Holt; John Richardson	Frederick Forbes; Arthur Macalister
Tuesday 8 April 1856
Cumberland Boroughs	William Bowman	William Redman; Ralph Robey; Robert Ross
Roxburgh	William Lee	William Cummings; William Suttor
Wednesday 9 April 1856
Cumberland (South Riding)	William Manning; Elias Weekes	Ryan Brenan; William Russell
Stanley County	Henry Buckley	William Dorsey
Thursday 10 April 1856
Gloucester and Macquarie	Thomas Barker	Joseph Andrews; James Williamson
St Vincent	James Thompson	William Roberts; Richard Sadleir
Wellington County	George Cox	Saul Samuel
Friday 11 April 1856
Phillip, Brisbane and Bligh	John Robertson	Joseph Docker
Tuesday 15 April 1856
Clarence and Darling Downs	Clark Irving	Colin McKenzie
Wednesday 16 April 1856
Liverpool Plains and Gwydir	Gideon Lang; Francis Rusden	Augustus Morris
Maneroo	Daniel Egan	
Murrumbidgee	John Hay; George Macleay	
Wellington and Bligh	George Lord	William Buchanan
Thursday 17 April 1856
Moreton, Wide Bay, Burnett and Maranoa	Gordon Sandeman	
New England and Macleay	Richard Hargrave; Thomas Rusden	John Dickson
Northumberland and Hunter	Hovenden Hely; William Piddington; Alexander Scott	George Bowman; Henry Douglass; Walter Rotton
Saturday 19 April 1856
Lachlan and Lower Darling	James Garland; William Macleay	John Hardy; D H Thorn

== See also ==
- Members of the New South Wales Legislative Assembly, 1856–1858
