= Candidates of the 1859 New South Wales colonial election =

This is a list of candidates for the 1859 New South Wales colonial election. The election was held from 9 June to 7 July 1859.

There was no recognisable party structure at this election.

== Retiring Members ==
- Andrew Aldcorn MLA (St Vincent)
- Richard Bowker MLA (North Eastern Boroughs)
- Henry Buckley MLA (Stanley County)
- Robert Campbell MLA (Sydney City)
- George Cox MLA (Wellington (County))
- Stuart Donaldson MLA (Cumberland (South Riding))
- Peter Faucett MLA (King and Georgiana)
- William Lee MLA (Roxburgh)
- Edward Lloyd MLA (Liverpool Plains and Gwydir)
- James Macarthur MLA (West Camden)
- George Macleay MLA (Murrumbidgee)
- John Marks MLA (East Camden)
- John Paterson MLA (Lachlan and Lower Darling)
- Thomas Smith MLA (Cumberland (North Riding))
- William Taylor MLA (New England and Macleay)
- George Thornton MLA (Sydney City)
- Robert Tooth MLA (Sydney City)
- George White MLA (Northumberland and Hunter)

== Legislative Assembly ==
Sitting members are shown in bold text. Successful candidates are highlighted.

Electorates are arranged chronologically from the day the poll was held. Because of the sequence of polling, some sitting members who were defeated in their constituencies were then able to contest other constituencies later in the polling period. On the second occasion, these members are shown in italic text.

Electorate	Successful candidates	Unsuccessful candidates
Thursday 9 June 1859
Bathurst	John Clements	**Henry Rotton**
East Sydney	John Black; **Charles Cowper**; **James Martin**; Henry Parkes	William Allen; William Benbow; Richard Driver; Charles Kemp; William Wentworth
Friday 10 June 1859
Paddington	**Daniel Cooper**	William Windeyer
Saturday 11 June 1859
Brisbane	**John Richardson**	
Monday 13 June 1859
East Macquarie	William Cummings; **William Suttor**	Charles McPhillamy; Charles Whalan
Tuesday 14 June 1859
Goulburn	William Roberts	Richard Driver
Ipswich	Arthur Macalister	**Benjamin Cribb**
Newcastle	**Arthur Hodgson**	James Hannell
West Macquarie	John McPhillamy	Thomas Hawkins
West Sydney	Thomas Broughton; John Lang; James Pemell; **John Plunkett**	**Daniel Deniehy**; Thomas Duigan; Robert Stewart
Wednesday 15 June 1859
Glebe	**John Campbell**	Ewen Cameron
Illawarra	**John Hargrave**	Francis MacCabe
Wellington	Nicolas Hyeronimus	Arthur Holroyd
Thursday 16 June 1859
Kiama	Samuel Gray	Francis Carberry; George Grey
Nepean	**Robert Jamison**	
Paterson	**William Arnold**	William Bucknell; Henry Dangar
Williams	Stephen Dark	**Samuel Gordon**
Friday 17 June 1859
Murrumbidgee	**William Macleay**	
Newtown	Alexander McArthur	Stephen Brown; Edward Hill; Thomas Holt
Northumberland	**Alexander Scott**	
St Leonards	Edward Sayers	James Farnell; Isaac Shepherd
Saturday 18 June 1859
Argyle	**Terence Murray**	Richard Driver
Canterbury	**Edward Flood**; Samuel Lyons	John Lucas; Maurice Reynolds; Samuel Terry; William Windeyer
East Maitland	Joseph Chambers	**James Dickson**
East Moreton	Robert Cribb	**William Tooth**
Mudgee	Lyttleton Bayley	Robert Lowe
Orange	Saul Samuel	John Suttor
Parramatta	**James Byrnes**; **George Oakes**	Arthur Holroyd
Monday 20 June 1859
Braidwood	Frederick Cooper	Merion Moriarty; Stephen Richardson; George Simpson
Wollombi	William Cape	
Tuesday 21 June 1859
Carcoar	William Watt	
Clarence	Clark Irving	Alexander MacKellar; Edward Ryan
Queanbeyan	**William Forster**	
Shoalhaven	John Garrett	George Alley; Charles Blakeney; Alexander Campbell
West Maitland	**Elias Weekes**	
West Moreton	Henry Mort	Henry Challinor
Windsor	**William Dalley**	Robert Ross
Thursday 23 June 1859
Central Cumberland	James Atkinson; John Laycock	John Beit; John Lackey
Eden	**Daniel Egan**	Henry Clarke
Friday 24 June 1859
Lachlan	John Ryan	
Morpeth	Edward Close	Samuel Gordon
Tenterfield	Randolph Nott	Robert Meston
Upper Hunter	**John Robertson**	Thomas Dangar; Daniel Deniehy
Yass Plains	Thomas Laidlaw	
Saturday 25 June 1859
Hartley	Henry Rotton	Ryan Brenan
Hawkesbury	John Darvall; **William Piddington**	
Hunter	**Richard Jones**	Daniel Deniehy
Monday 27 June 1859
Narellan	John Hurley	John Oxley
Tuesday 28 June 1859
Camden	Henry Oxley; **William Wild**	John Morrice
Hume	Morris Asher	J D Badham; Thomas Mate; Eugene Owen
Wednesday 29 June 1859
Lower Hunter	William Windeyer	**James Williamson**
Murray	**John Hay**	
Thursday 30 June 1859
Monaro	Alexander Hamilton	**Daniel Egan**
New England	**James Hart**	James Eames; Thomas Rusden
Patrick's Plains	William Russell	James Dickson
Tumut	George Lang	John Egan; James Garland
Friday 1 July 1859
Hastings	Henry Flett	J Andrews; James McCarthy; Frederick Panton
Tuesday 5 July 1859
Balranald	Augustus Morris	William Brodribb
Bogan	**George Lord**	Christopher McRae
Burnett	Gilbert Eliott	George Howard
Darling Downs	John Douglas; William Handcock	John McLean
Liverpool Plains	Andrew Loder	Francis Rusden
Wednesday 6 July 1859
Goldfields North	James Hoskins	Edward Hargraves; James Macnamara
Goldfields South	Bowie Wilson	John Egan
Goldfields West	Robert Wisdom	William Redman
Leichhardt	William Walsh	
Thursday 7 July 1859
Gwydir	**Richard Jenkins**	

== See also ==
- Members of the New South Wales Legislative Assembly, 1859–1860
