= Electoral results for the district of Northumberland Boroughs =

Election results for Northumberland Boroughs, New South Wales, Australia

Northumberland Boroughs, an electoral district of the Legislative Assembly in the Australian state of New South Wales was created in 1856 and abolished in 1859.

Election	Member	Party	Member	Party
1856	Bourn Russell	None	Bob Nichols	None
1856 re-count	Elias Weekes	None	Bob Nichols	None
1857 by	Elias Weekes	None	James Dickson	None
1858	Elias Weekes	None	James Dickson	None

== Election results ==
=== 1858 ===
1858 New South Wales colonial election: Northumberland Boroughs Wednesday 27 January
Candidate	Votes	%
James Dickson (re-elected)	unopposed	
Elias Weekes (re-elected)	unopposed	

=== 1857 by-election ===
1857 Northumberland Boroughs by-election Friday 6 November
Candidate	Votes	%
James Dickson (elected)	495	51.8
Bourn Russell	460	48.2
Total formal votes	955	100.0
Informal votes	0	0.0
Turnout	955	61.8

Bob Nichols died.

=== 1856 re-count ===
1856 Northumberland Boroughs election re-count Tuesday 5 August
Candidate	Votes	%
Elias Weekes (elected)	511	30.7
Bourn Russell (defeated)	500	29.9
Total formal votes	1,671	100.0
Informal votes	0	0.0
Turnout	1,011	61.1

The Committee of Elections and Qualifications conducted a re-count of the 1856 Northumberland Boroughs election and declared that Bourn Russell had not been elected the member for Northumberland Boroughs. No by-election was conducted, instead the committee declared that Elias Weekes had been elected.

=== 1856 ===
1856 New South Wales colonial election: Northumberland Boroughs
Candidate	Votes	%
Bob Nichols (elected 1)	660	39.0
Bourn Russell (elected 2)	521	30.8
Elias Weekes	513	30.3
Total formal votes	1,694	100.0
Informal votes	0	0.0
Turnout	1,034	62.4

Polling was conducted on 28 March 1856. Nichols represented this district in the old Legislative Council. Committee of Elections and Qualifications conducted a re-count and overturned the election of Bourn Russell and declared that Elias Weekes had been elected.
