= Electoral results for the district of Western Division of Camden =

Election results for West Camden, New South Wales, Australia

Western Division of Camden, an electoral district of the Legislative Assembly in the Australian state of New South Wales was created in 1856 and abolished in 1859.

== Members ==
Election	Member	Party	Member	Party
1856	James Macarthur	None	John Oxley	None
1856 by	James Macarthur	None	John Oxley	None
1858	James Macarthur	None	William Wild	None

== Election results ==
=== Elections in the 1850s ===
==== 1858 ====
1858 New South Wales colonial election: Western Division of Camden 21 January
Candidate	Votes	%
James Macarthur (re-elected 1)	366	40.1
William Wild (elected 2)	358	39.3
John Oxley (defeated)	188	20.6
Total formal votes	912	100.0
Informal votes	0	0.0
Turnout	912	53.5

==== 1856 by-election ====
1856 Western Division of Camden by-election Monday 16 June
Candidate	Votes	%
James Macarthur (re-elected)	unopposed	

James Macarthur was concerned about the constitutionality of the transition to responsible government and resigned.

==== 1856 ====
1856 New South Wales colonial election: Western Division of Camden
Candidate	Votes	%
John Oxley (elected)	unopposed	
James Macarthur (elected)	unopposed	

Polling was scheduled to be conducted on 31 March 1856. Macarthur had represented this district in the old Legislative Council.
