= Electoral results for the district of Cumberland (South Riding) =

Election results for Cumberland South Riding, New South Wales, Australia

Cumberland South Riding, an electoral district of the Legislative Assembly in the Australian state of New South Wales was created in 1856 and abolished in 1859.

Election	Member	Party	Member	Party
1856	William Manning	None	Elias Weekes	None
August 1856 by	William Manning	None	Ryan Brenan	None
October 1856 by	William Manning	None	Ryan Brenan	None
November 1856 by	William Manning	None	Stuart Donaldson	None
1857 by	James Byrnes	None	Stuart Donaldson	None
1858	Edward Flood	None	Stuart Donaldson	None

== Election results ==
=== Elections in the 1850s ===
==== 1858 ====
1858 New South Wales colonial election: Cumberland (South Riding) 30 January
Candidate	Votes	%
Edward Flood (re-elected 1)	1,271	42.3
Stuart Donaldson (re-elected 2)	955	31.8
Thomas Holt (defeated)	778	25.9
George Smith	0	0.0
Total formal votes	3,004	100.0
Informal votes	0	0.0
Turnout	3,004	41.3

The other sitting member James Byrnes successfully contested Parramatta. Edward Flood was a sitting member for North Eastern Boroughs. Thomas Holt was the sitting member for Stanley Boroughs. There was some debate as to whether George Smith had received no votes, with Stuart Donaldson stating that he had seen one vote while Edward Flood said he had seen several.

==== 1857 by-election ====
1857 Cumberland (South Riding) by-election Friday 12 June
Candidate	Votes	%
James Byrnes (elected)	769	58.4
Ryan Brenan	548	41.6
Total formal votes	1,317	100.0
Informal votes	0	0.0
Turnout	1,317	36.2

William Manning resigned on account of ill-health.

==== November 1856 by-election ====
1856 Cumberland (South Riding) by-election Tuesday 4 November
Candidate	Votes	%
Stuart Donaldson (elected)	unopposed	

The Qualifications Committee declared the election of Ryan Brenan was invalid as no poll had been conducted at Canterbury. Brenan was persuaded not to stand to allow Stuart Donaldson to regain a seat, having lost Sydney Hamlets in a ministerial by-election.

==== October 1856 by-election ====
1856 Cumberland (South Riding) by-election Friday 17 October
Candidate	Votes	%
William Manning (elected)	893	80.6
William Redman	215	19.4
Total formal votes	1,108	100.0
Informal votes	0	0
Turnout	1,108	40.3

The by-election was caused by the appointment of William Manning as Attorney-General in the Parker ministry.

==== August 1856 by-election ====
1856 Cumberland (South Riding) by-election Thursday 21 August
Candidate	Votes	%
Ryan Brenan (elected)	435	42.7
Augustus Morris	367	36.0
Thomas W Shepherd	110	10.8
William Sherwin	107	10.5
Total formal votes	1,019	100.0
Informal votes	0	0
Turnout	1,019	37.1

Elias Weekes resigned in August 1856 after winning his appeal against his defeat in Northumberland Boroughs.

==== 1856 ====
1856 New South Wales colonial election: Cumberland (South Riding)
Candidate	Votes	%
William Manning (elected 1)	833	38.7
Elias Weekes (elected 2)	576	26.8
Ryan Brenan	521	24.2
William Russell	220	10.2
Total formal votes	2,150	100.0
Informal votes	0	0.0
Turnout	1,242	45.2

Polling was conducted on 9 April 1856. Manning had served in the old Legislative Council as an appointed member. Unlike other newly appointed Ministers, he did not have to resign and contest a ministerial by-election as he already held the office of Solicitor-General at the time of his election. Weekes was elected, but later won an appeal against his defeat in Northumberland Boroughs, choosing to sit for that seat and resign from this seat. The subsequent by-election was won by Brenan.
