= 1857 Northumberland Boroughs colonial by-election =

By-election in New South Wales, Australia

A by-election was held for the New South Wales Legislative Assembly electorate of Northumberland Boroughs on 6 November 1857 because of the death of Bob Nichols.

== Dates ==
Date	Event
27 September 1857	Bob Nichols died.
22 October 1857	Writ of election issued by the Speaker of the Legislative Assembly.
3 November 1857	Nominations
6 November 1857	Polling day
10 November 1857	Return of writ

== Candidates ==
- James Dickson was a partner in a large and successful business, which commenced as a general store at Maitland, but also had large lease holdings in New England.
- Captain Bourn Russell, chairman of the Hunter River New Steam Navigation Company, had been elected a member for Northumberland Boroughs at the 1856 election however his election was overturned by the Committee of Elections and Qualifications on a re-count.

== Result ==
1857 Northumberland Boroughs by-election Friday 6 November
Candidate	Votes	%
James Dickson (elected)	495	51.8
Bourn Russell	460	48.2
Total formal votes	955	100.0
Informal votes	0	0.0
Turnout	955	61.8

== See also ==
- Electoral results for the district of Northumberland Boroughs
- List of New South Wales state by-elections
