= August 1856 Cumberland (South Riding) colonial by-election =

By-election in New South Wales, Australia

A by-election was held for the New South Wales Legislative Assembly electorate of Cumberland South Riding on 21 August 1856 because Elias Weekes resigned in August 1856 after winning his appeal against his defeat in Northumberland Boroughs.

== Dates ==
Date	Event
9 April 1856	Elias Weekes elected at the election for Cumberland (South Riding)
22 May 1856	Elias Weekes sworn in as a member for Cumberland (South Riding)
24 June 1856	Committee of Elections and Qualifications declared that Elias Weekes had been elected for Northumberland.
5 August 1856	Next sitting day of the Legislative Assembly and the report of the Committee of Elections and Qualifications was printed.
5 August 1856	Elias Weeks resigned as a member for Cumberland (South Riding).
6 August 1856	Writ of election issued by the Speaker of the Legislative Assembly.
18 August 1856	Nominations at Parramatta
21 August 1856	Polling day between 9 am and 4 pm.
27 August 1856	Return of writ

== Result ==
1856 Cumberland (South Riding) by-election Thursday 21 August
Candidate	Votes	%
Ryan Brenan (elected)	435	42.7
Augustus Morris	367	36.0
Thomas W Shepherd	110	10.8
William Sherwin	107	10.5
Total formal votes	1,019	100.0
Informal votes	0	0
Turnout	1,019	37.1

== See also ==
- Electoral results for the district of Cumberland (South Riding)
- List of New South Wales state by-elections
