= 1856 Western Division of Camden colonial by-election =

By-election in New South Wales, Australia

A by-election was held for the New South Wales Legislative Assembly electorate of Western Division of Camden on 16 June 1856 because James Macarthur was concerned about the constitutionality of the transition to responsible government and resigned.

== Dates ==
Date	Event
26 March 1856	Nominations for Western Division of Camden
6 June 1856	James Macarthur resigned
7 June 1856	Writ of election issued by the Speaker of the Legislative Assembly.
16 June 1856	Nominations at Camden.
21 June 1856	Polling day between the hours of 9 am and 4 pm.
25 June 1856	Return of writ

== Result ==
1856 Western Division of Camden by-election Monday 16 June
Candidate	Votes	%
James Macarthur (re-elected)	unopposed	

== See also ==
- Electoral results for the district of Western Division of Camden
- List of New South Wales state by-elections
