= Electoral district of Wellington =

There are four abolished electorates by the name of Wellington in Australia:

- Electoral district of Wellington (New South Wales)
- Electoral district of Wellington (Tasmania)
- Electoral district of Wellington (Western Australia)
  - Electoral district of Wellington (Legislative Council)

Additionally, three other past and present electorates incorporate the name Wellington:

- Electoral district of Murray-Wellington (Western Australia, current)
- Electoral district of Wellington (County) (New South Wales, abolished)
- Electoral district of Wellington and Bligh (New South Wales, abolished)
