= 1856 Northumberland Boroughs colonial election re-count =

By-election in New South Wales, Australia

In August 1856 the Committee of Elections and Qualifications conducted a re-count of the 1856 election for the district of Northumberland Boroughs, in which Bourn Russell had been declared elected by a margin of 8 votes over Elias Weekes.

The returning officer was Isaac Gorrick who was a friend of Bourn Russell. The nomination of Russell was moved by Edward Close and seconded by John Kingsmill. Once a poll was called for, Gorrick appointed Close and Kingsmill as deputy returning officers. In January Close had also chaired a meeting at Morpeth where Weekes had addressed the voters.

William Christie lodged a petition with a £100 deposit, against the election alleging that more than 20 people who were unqualified to vote had voted for Russell. This was not a secret ballot and voters were required to write their name and address on the ballot paper. Christie subsequently published a list of the 21 people whose votes had been struck off. Because the committee was able to identify the ballot papers for people who were unable to vote, they recounted the eligible votes and declared that Elias Weekes had been elected.

== Dates ==
Date	Event
26 March 1856	Nominations for Northumberland Boroughs.
28 March 1856	1856 Northumberland Boroughs election
9 April 1856	Elias Weekes elected at the election for Cumberland (South Riding)
22 May 1856	Members of parliament sworn in, Bourn Russell as a member for Northumberland Boroughs, Elias Weekes as a member for Cumberland (South Riding)
19 April 1894	Petition lodged by William Christie.
23 May 1856	Committee of Elections and Qualifications appointed
29 May 1856	Petition referred to the Committee of Elections and Qualifications.
24 June 1856	Committee of Elections and Qualifications declared that Elias Weekes had been elected.
5 August 1856	Next sitting day of the Legislative Assembly and the report of the Committee of Elections and Qualifications was printed.

== Result ==
1856 Northumberland Boroughs election re-count Tuesday 5 August
Candidate	Votes	%
Elias Weekes (elected)	511	30.7
Bourn Russell (defeated)	500	29.9
Total formal votes	1,671	100.0
Informal votes	0	0.0
Turnout	1,011	61.1

== See also ==
- Electoral results for the district of Northumberland Boroughs
- List of New South Wales state by-elections
