= 1857 Cumberland (South Riding) colonial by-election =

By-election in New South Wales, Australia

A by-election was held for the New South Wales Legislative Assembly electorate of Cumberland South Riding on 12 June 1856 because William Manning resigned in May 1857 due to ill-health.

== Dates ==
Date	Event
18 May 1857	William Manning resigned.
21 May 1857	Writ of election issued by the Speaker of the Legislative Assembly.
9 June 1857	Nominations
12 June 1857	Polling day
16 June 1857	Return of writ

== Result ==
1857 Cumberland (South Riding) by-election Friday 12 June
Candidate	Votes	%
James Byrnes (elected)	769	58.4
Ryan Brenan	548	41.6
Total formal votes	1,317	100.0
Informal votes	0	0.0
Turnout	1,317	36.2

== See also ==
- Electoral results for the district of Cumberland (South Riding)
- List of New South Wales state by-elections
