= Electoral district of Southern Boroughs =

State electoral district of New South Wales, Australia

Southern Boroughs was an electoral district for the Legislative Assembly in the Australian state of New South Wales created in 1856. It included the towns of Goulburn, Braidwood, Yass and Queanbeyan, while the surrounding rural area were in the electoral districts of Argyle, United Counties of Murray and St Vincent and King and Georgiana. It was replaced by Goulburn, Braidwood, Queanbeyan and Yass in 1859.

== Members ==
Member	Party	Period
Terence Murray	None	1856–1859

== Election results ==
=== 1856 ===
1856 New South Wales colonial election: Southern Boroughs
Candidate	Votes	%
Terence Murray (elected)	unopposed	

Polling was scheduled to be conducted on 4 April 1856. Murray had represented this district in the old Legislative Council.

=== 1858 ===
1858 New South Wales colonial election: Southern Boroughs 28 January
Candidate	Votes	%
Terrence Murray (re-elected)	204	56.2
John Hardy	159	43.8
Total formal votes	363	100.0
Informal votes	0	0.0
Turnout	363	62.37
