= John Benton Wild =

Irish-born Australian politician

John Benton Wild (10 November 1806 – 26 June 1857) was an Irish-born Australian politician.

He was born in County Offaly to Lieutenant John Wild and Mary Lynch. He was a pastoralist, and on 12 February 1832 married Emmeline Gaudry at Cobbitty. They had thirteen children, one of whom, William, was a member of the New South Wales Legislative Assembly.

John Wild was elected as a member of the New South Wales Legislative Council from 1845 to 1848, representing the County of Camden. He died near Camden in 1857.

New South Wales Legislative Council
Preceded by Roger Therry	Member for County of Camden; Feb 1845 – 20 Jun 1848	Succeeded by James Macarthur
