= Electoral district of County of Camden =

Former legislative council electoral district of New South Wales, Australia

County of Camden New South Wales—Legislative Council
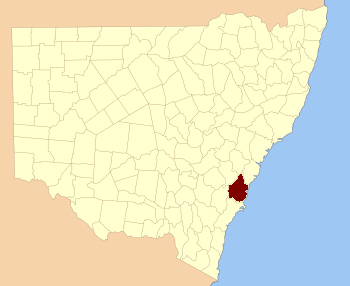
- Location within modern New South Wales
- State: New South Wales
- Created: 1843
- Abolished: 1856
- Namesake: Camden County
- Coordinates: 34°30′S 150°30′E

The Electoral district of County of Camden was an electorate of the New South Wales Legislative Council at a time when some of its members were elected and the balance were appointed by the Governor.

The 1851 Electoral Act increased the number of members in the Council from 36 to 54, 18 to be appointed and 36 elected. From this time the district was split into two divisions each returning one member; the Eastern division of the County of Camden and the Western division of the County of Camden. In 1856 the unicameral Legislative Council was abolished and replaced with an elected Legislative Assembly and an appointed Legislative Council. The district was represented by the Legislative Assembly electorates of Eastern Division of Camden and Western Division of Camden.

== Members ==
Member	Term		
Roger Therry	1 Jun 1843 – 28 Feb 1845		
John Benton Wild	1 Feb 1845 – 20 Jun 1848		
James Macarthur	1 Jul 1848 – 30 Jun 1851		
Western Camden	Term	Eastern Camden	Term
James Macarthur	1 Sep 1851 – 29 Feb 1856	Henry Osborne	1 Sep 1851 – 29 Feb 1856

- James Macarthur went on to represent Western Camden in the Legislative Assembly from 1856 while Henry Osborne represented Eastern Camden.

== Election results ==
=== 1843 ===
1843 New South Wales colonial election, 24 June: County of Camden
Candidate	Votes	%
Roger Therry	146	51.77
Charles Cowper	136	48.23
Total votes	282	100.00

=== 1845 by-election ===
Roger Therry resigned in February 1845 as he had been appointed a judge of the Supreme Court of New South Wales for the District of Port Phillip.

County of Camden by-election 27 February 1846
Candidate	Votes	%
John Benton Wild	126	54.31
Alick Osborne	106	45.69
Total votes	232	100.00

=== 1848 ===
1848 New South Wales colonial election, 31 July: County of Camden
Candidate	Votes	%
James Macarthur (elected)	unopposed	

=== 1851 ===
1851 New South Wales colonial election, 20 September: Eastern Camden
Candidate	Votes	%
Henry Osborne	308	62.60
James Wilshire	184	37.40
Total votes	492	100

1851 New South Wales colonial election, 22 September: Western Camden
Candidate	Votes	%
James Macarthur	189	70.52
Dr William Sherwin	79	29.48
Total votes	268	100
Voter turnout	66.83%	

== See also ==
- Members of the New South Wales Legislative Council, 1843–1851 and 1851-1856
