= Joseph Chambers (politician) =

English-born Australian politician (1815–1884)

Joseph Chambers (1815 – 16 July 1884) was an English-born Australian politician.

Joseph Chambers
| Born | January 1, 1815 Portsmouth, England |
| Died | August 16, 1884 (Aged 69) |
| Occupations | Lawyer; Politician |
| Spouses | Mary Jane Way (m. 1843); Mary Kelly (m. 1873) |
| Children | George Chambers (1844 - Unknown) Bladgen Chambers (1846 - 1943) Josephine Mary Chambers (1850 - 1901) Mary Chambers (1852) Preston Chambers (1854 - 1936) |

He was born in Portsmouth and worked as a solicitor before entering politics. On 25 November 1843 he married Mary Jane Way; his second marriage, on 13 October 1873, was to widow Mary Kelly. He had five children with Mary Jane Way; George Chambers, Bladgen Chambers, Josephine Mary Chambers, Mary Chambers, and Preston Chambers.

He was nominated on June 16th, 1859 and the Polling was on June 18th. He won the vote 210 to 131 against his opponent James Dickson. He was elected to the New South Wales Legislative Assembly for East Maitland at the 1859 election, but his seat was declared vacant two months later on his appointment as Crown Prosecutor at Quarter Sessions, allocated to the Western District.

Chambers died at East Maitland in 1884 (aged 68–69).

New South Wales Legislative Assembly
| New district | Member for East Maitland; 1859 | Succeeded by James Dickson |
