= William Dorsey =

English-born Australian medical practitioner (1813 – 1878)

- Born: 1813; Nuneaton, Warwickshire, England
- Died: 16 May 1878 (aged 64–65); Queensland, Australia
- Burial place: Ipswich cemetery
- Education: University of Glasgow
- Occupation: medical practitioner
- Known for: played an active role in the development of Ipswich, Queensland, Australia
- Spouse: Margaret Douglas (m. 1837)

William McTaggart Dorsey (1813 – 16 May 1878) was an English-born Australian medical practitioner who played an active role in the development of Ipswich.

He was born at Nuneaton in Warwickshire to Alexander Dorsey and Elizabeth Donald. He attended the University of Glasgow, where he studied medicine. He married Margaret Douglas in 1837, and in 1839 sailed for New Zealand, arriving at Wellington in 1840. Finding little success, he moved to Sydney later in the year and was certified to practise medicine; he settled at Bathurst. In 1842 he moved to Moreton Bay and in 1843 built a house in Ipswich, where he practised. He also leased pastoral land on the Darling Downs, where he ran sheep. Dorsey was an enthusiastic and pugnacious advocate for the further development of the district.

Dorsey also expanded his own pastoral holdings, purchasing land around Moreton Bay and further afield. He returned to Glasgow to study for his Doctorate of Medicine, which he received in 1857. On his return, he was forced to sell land but was nonetheless insolvent from 1862. In 1865 he became government medical officer for the local immigration depot and departments of railway and police. Persistent attempts to increase his salary and working conditions failed, and he soon focused instead on his private practice. He died of heart disease in 1878.
