= William Wild (politician) =

Australian politician

William Vandermuelen Wild (4 October 1834 – 25 May 1861) was an Australian politician.

He was born in Camden to Emmeline Gaudry (Godfrey) and John Benton Wild then pastoralist, later elected a member of the New South Wales Legislative Assembly from 1845 until 1848. On 26 January 1855 he married Eliza Jane Green, with whom he had three sons. A barrister from 1858, he was elected to the New South Wales Legislative Assembly for West Camden in 1858. Re-elected for Camden in 1859, he did not run in 1860. Wild died in Sydney in 1861.

New South Wales Legislative Assembly
Preceded by John Oxley	Member for West Camden; 1858–1859; Served alongside: James Macarthur	Abolished
New seat	Member for Camden; 1859–1860; Served alongside: Henry Oxley	Succeeded by John Douglas; John Morrice
