= Electoral district of Cook and Westmoreland =

Former state electoral district of New South Wales, Australia

District of Cook and Westmoreland New South Wales—Legislative Assembly
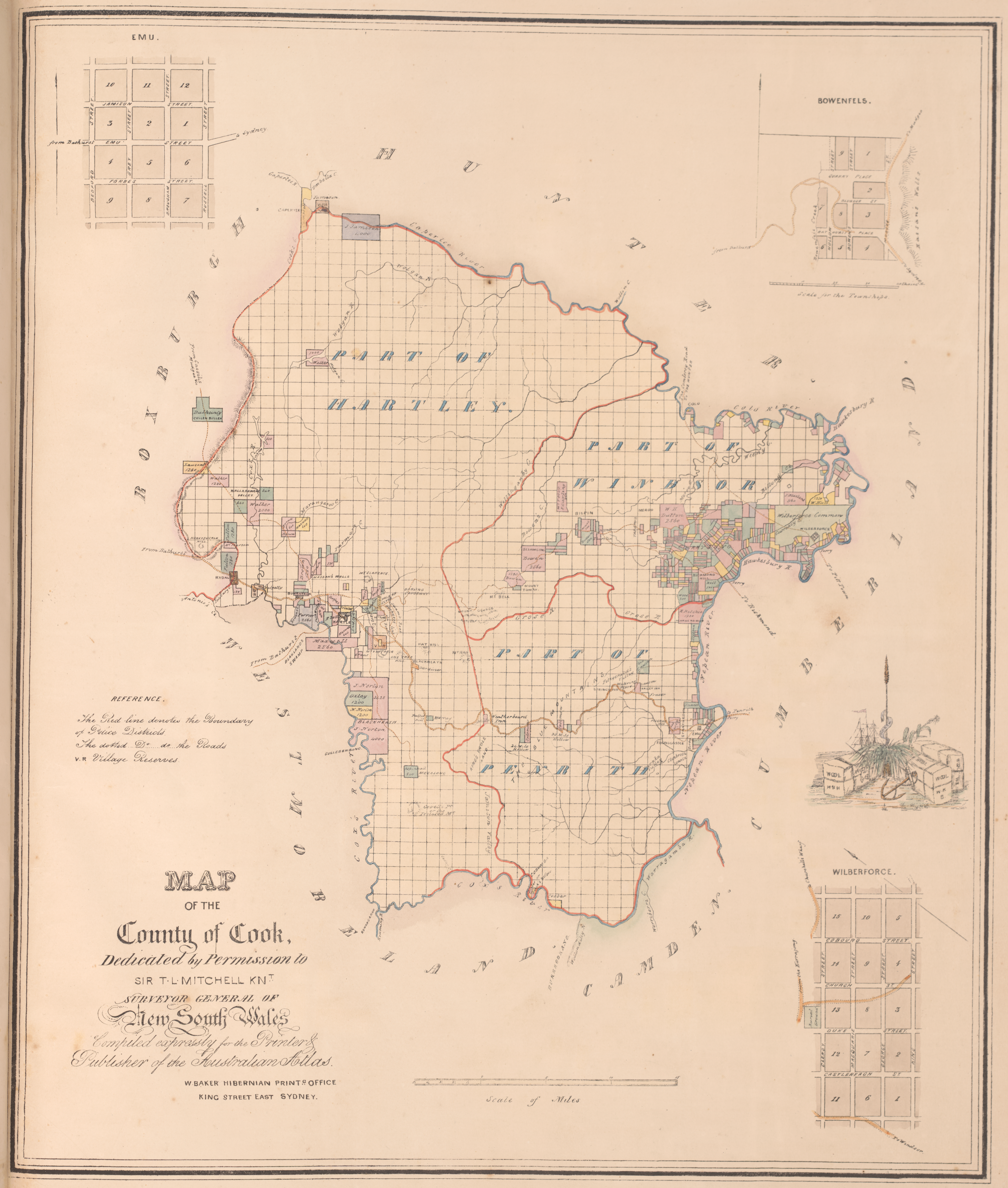
- Cook county in the 1840s
- State: New South Wales
- Created: 1856
- Abolished: 1859
- Namesake: Cook & Westmoreland counties
- Coordinates: 33°32′S 150°7′E

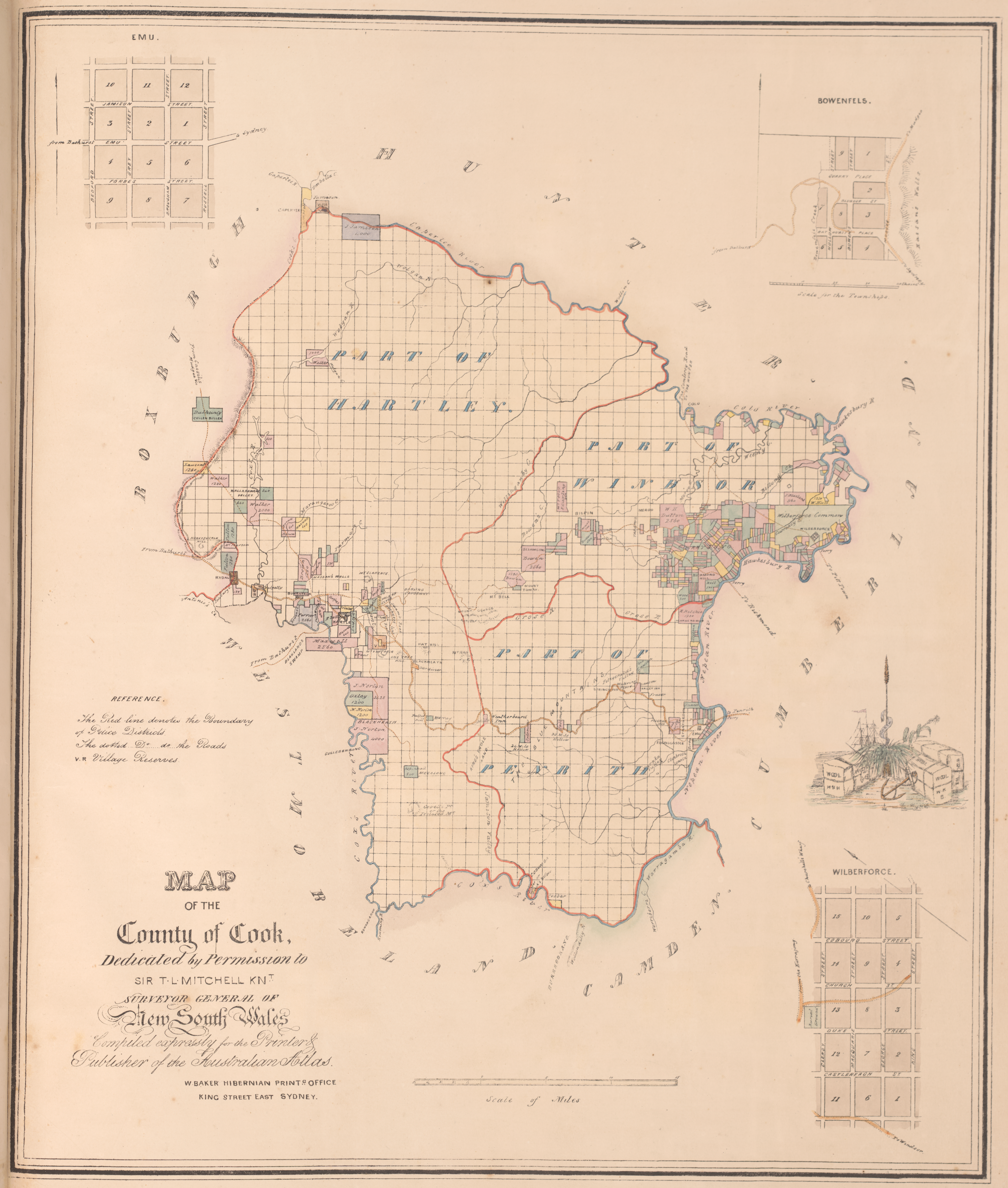
Westmoreland county in the 1840s

Cook and Westmoreland was an electoral district of the Legislative Assembly in the Australian state of New South Wales in the first and second Parliaments (1856–1859), named after Cook and Westmoreland counties in the Blue Mountains, Lithgow and Oberon areas. It elected two members simultaneously, with voters casting two votes and the first two candidates being elected. It was largely replaced by Hartley, however both members moved to other electorates, James Martin became the member for East Sydney, while Robert Jamison became the member for Nepean.

== Member for Cook and Westmoreland ==
Member	Party	Period	Member	Party	Period
James Martin	None	1856–1859	Robert Jamison	None	1856–1859

== Election results ==
There was only one contested election held in the district, in the 1856 New South Wales colonial election. James Martin twice resigned in 1856 and 1857 as a result of accepting appointment as Attorney General, however on both occasions he was re-elected unopposed.

=== 1856 ===
1856 New South Wales colonial election: Cook and Westmoreland
Candidate	Votes	%
James Martin (elected 1)	321	39.5
Robert Jamison (elected 2)	303	37.3
John Arkins	189	23.3
Total formal votes	813	100.0
Informal votes	0	0.0
Turnout	487	54.4

Polling was conducted on 4 April 1856. Martin represented Counties of Cook and Westmoreland in the old Legislative Council.

=== 1858 ===
1858 New South Wales colonial election: Cook and Westmoreland 27 January
Candidate	Votes	%
James Martin (re-elected)	unopposed	
Robert Jamison (re-elected)	unopposed	
