= Electoral district of Gloucester and Macquarie =

Former state electoral district of New South Wales, Australia

Gloucester and Macquarie New South Wales—Legislative Assembly
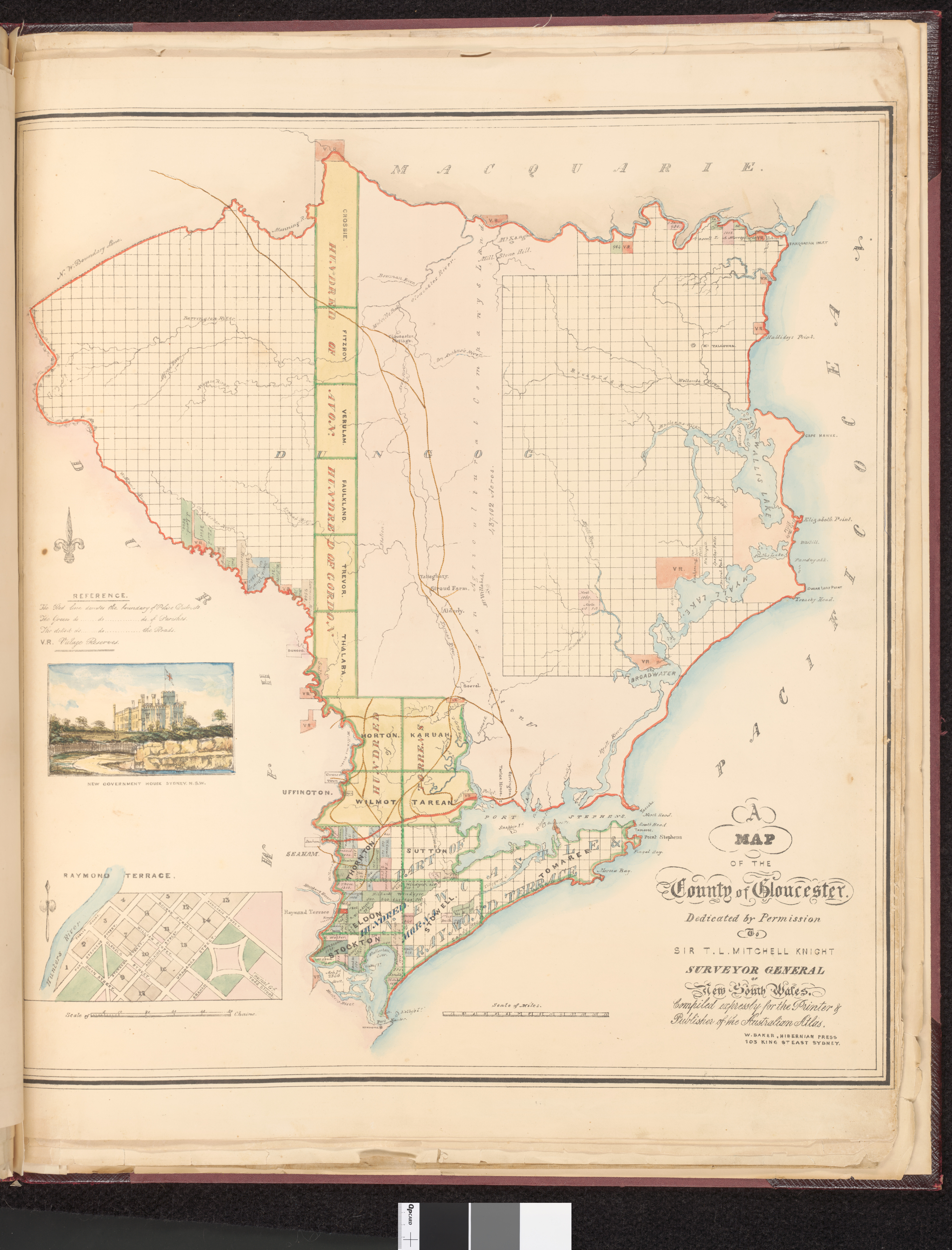
- Gloucester county in the 1840s
- State: New South Wales
- Created: 1856
- Abolished: 1859
- Namesake: Gloucester County, Macquarie County
- Coordinates: 30°S 153°E

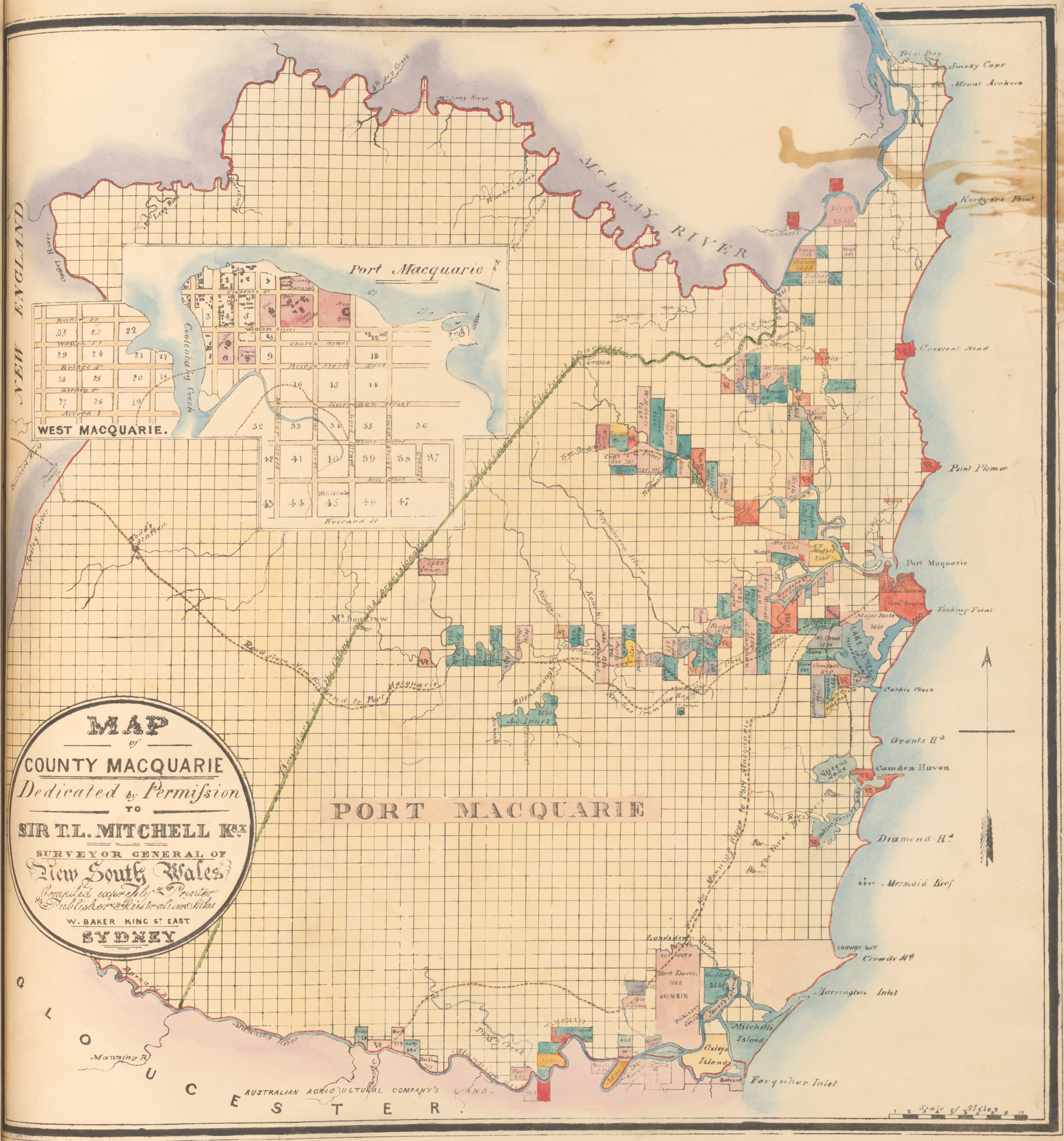
Macquarie county in the 1840s

Gloucester and Macquarie was an electoral district of the Legislative Assembly in the Australian state of New South Wales in the first and second Parliaments (1856-1859), named after Gloucester and Macquarie counties on the Mid North Coast. It was abolished in 1859 with Macquarie, the north-east of Gloucester and the Macleay River area forming the new district of Electoral district of Hastings (New South Wales), while the rest of Gloucester was split between Lower Hunter, Northumberland and The Williams.

== Members for Gloucester and Macquarie ==
Member	Party	Period
Thomas Barker	None	1856–1857
James Williamson	None	1857–1859

== Election results ==
=== 1856 ===
1856 New South Wales colonial election: Gloucester and Macquarie
Candidate	Votes	%
Thomas Barker (elected)	163	37.7
James Williamson	139	32.18
Joseph Andrews	130	30.1
Total formal votes	432	100.0
Informal votes	0	0.0
Turnout	432	41.30

Polling was conducted on 10 April 1856. Barker served in the old Legislative Council as an appointed member. Sitting Legislative Councillor for Counties of Gloucester and Macquarie was Phillip Parker King who did not contest the election.

=== 1858 ===
1858 New South Wales colonial election: Gloucester and Macquarie 10 February
Candidate	Votes	%
James Williamson (elected)	425	60.7
Thomas Barker (defeated)	275	39.3
Total formal votes	700	100.0
Informal votes	0	0.0
Turnout	700	62.3
