= George Lord =

Australian politician

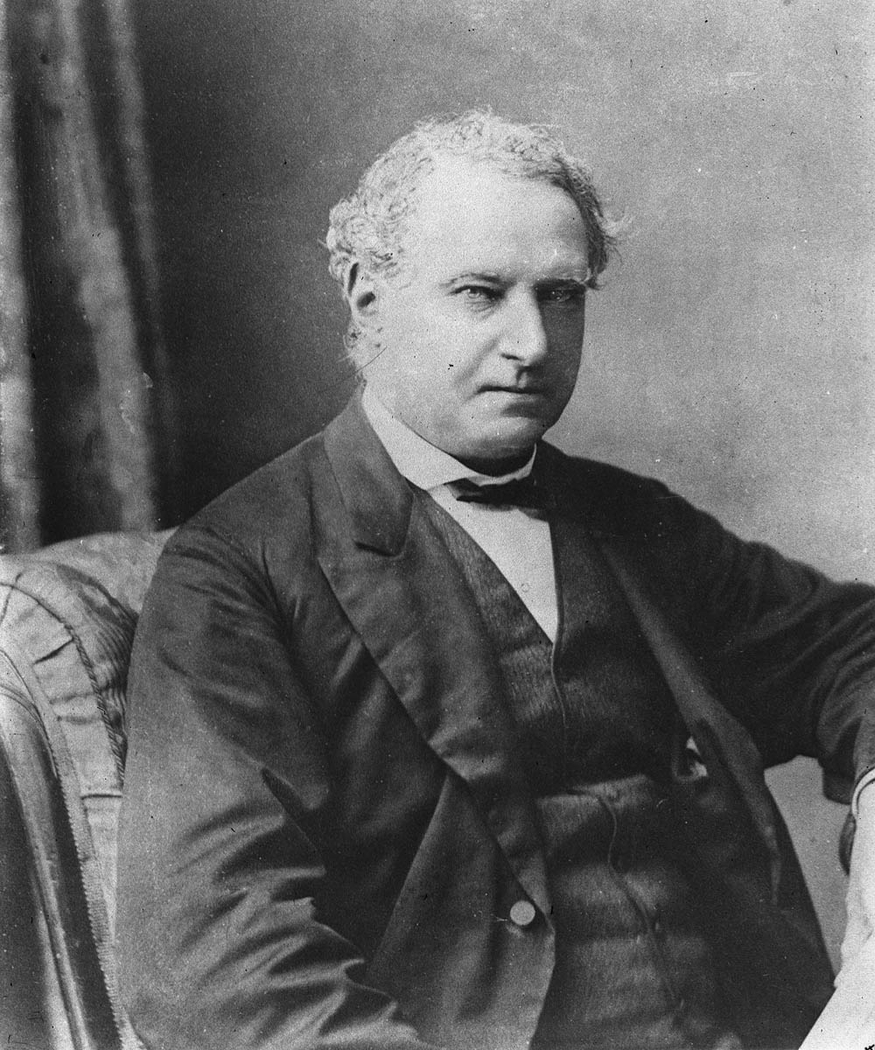
- portrait of George William Lord

Colonial Treasurer
- In office 16 December 1870 – 13 May 1872
- Preceded by: Saul Samuel
- Succeeded by: William Piddington

Personal details
- Born: George William Lord; 15 August 1818 Sydney, New South Wales, Australia
- Died: 9 May 1880 (aged 61) Darlinghurst, New South Wales, Australia

George William Lord (15 August 1818 – 9 May 1880) was an Australian pastoralist, businessman and politician. He was a member of the New South Wales Legislative Council from 1877 until his death. He was also a member of the New South Wales Legislative Assembly between 1856 and 1877. Lord was the Colonial Treasurer in the third government of James Martin.

== Early life ==
Lord was the seventh child of the ex-convict and pioneering entrepreneur Simeon Lord. At the age of 20 he began to acquire squatting runs in the Wellington district and by 1865 had the control of 672,000 acres. He was also a director of numerous colonial companies including, coal mines, meat works and the Commercial Banking Company of Sydney. He married Elizabeth, a daughter of William Lee.

== Colonial Parliament ==
At the first election under the new constitution Lord was elected to the Legislative Assembly as the member for Wellington and Bligh. He remained in the Assembly until 1877, representing Bogan after Wellington and Bligh was abolished at the 1859 election. He was an active politician who, by avoiding party intrigues was able to achieve a great deal for his electorate. He was a childhood friend of John Robertson and a supporter of James Martin. In 1877, he accepted a life appointment to the Legislative Council.

George's brother Francis (1812–1897), was a member of the Legislative Council for many years,

== Government ==
Lord was Colonial Treasurer in the third government of Martin. He presented one budget to the Assembly, which was severely criticized and then amended because of a 10% ad valorem property tax.

Parliament of New South Wales
Political offices
Preceded by Saul Samuel	Colonial Treasurer; 1870 – 1872	Succeeded by William Piddington
New South Wales Legislative Assembly
Preceded by First election	Member for Wellington and Bligh; 1856 – 1859	District abolished
New district	Member for Bogan; 1859 – 1877	Succeeded by Walter Coonan
