= Electoral district of United Counties of Murray and St Vincent =

Former state electoral district of New South Wales, Australia

United Counties of Murray and St Vincent was an electoral district of the Legislative Assembly in the Australian state of New South Wales from 1856 to 1859. It was named after Murray and St Vincent counties, including Canberra and Braidwood, although Braidwood and Queanbeyan were exclaves of the electoral district and formed parts of Southern Boroughs. Coastal St Vincent county (Batemans Bay and the Jervis Bay area) were included in the electoral district of St Vincent. Its only member was William Forster. Murray and St Vincent was replaced by Queanbeyan and Braidwood.

== Members for United Counties of Murray and St Vincent ==
Member	Party	Term
William Forster	None	1856–1859

== Election results ==
1858 New South Wales colonial election: United Counties of Murray and St Vincent 5 February
Candidate	Votes	%
William Forster (re-elected)	115	61.2
N S Powell	73	38.8
Total formal votes	188	100.0
Informal votes	0	0.0
Turnout	188	56.8

1856 New South Wales colonial election: United Counties of Murray and St Vincent
Candidate	Votes	%
William Forster (elected)	unopposed	

Polling was scheduled to be conducted on 5 April 1856. Sitting Legislative Councillor for Counties of Murray and St Vincent, Daniel Cooper contested Sydney Hamlets.
