= John Richard Hardy =

English-born Australian pastoralist and gold commissioner

John Richard Hardy (18 May 1807 – 21 April 1858) was an English-born Australian pastoralist and gold commissioner.

He was the son of vicar Robert Hardy and Sophia-Adair Hale, of Walberton in Sussex. He was educated at Charterhouse School, then went up to Trinity Hall, Cambridge, in 1826 but moved to Peterhouse in the following year. He played cricket for Cambridge University in 1829 and received a Bachelor of Arts degree in 1831.

Hardy migrated to Sydney in 1832 and edited the Australian for two years (1835-1837). He was credited with introducing roundarm bowling to Australia. He married Clara Stephen, sister of Sir Alfred Stephen, on 18 May 1837. In that year he was also appointed police magistrate at Yass, where he acquired property. He was suspended in 1843 on suspicion of irregular procedures. He was later police magistrate at Parramatta from 1849 to 1851.

Hardy was appointed chief gold commissioner in 1851 soon after gold was discovered; he was considered an able administrator by Godfrey Mundy and John Erskine. He supported the accessibility of gold found on private land, but was accused of giving preference to his brother and also, erroneously, of appropriating funds. A Legislative Council select committee found him "of a character wholly incompatible" with holding his office in 1852 and he was forced into retirement. He published a pamphlet on goldfield issues in 1855, and in 1857 was a founding member of the Yass Mechanics' Institute. He died, childless, in 1858.

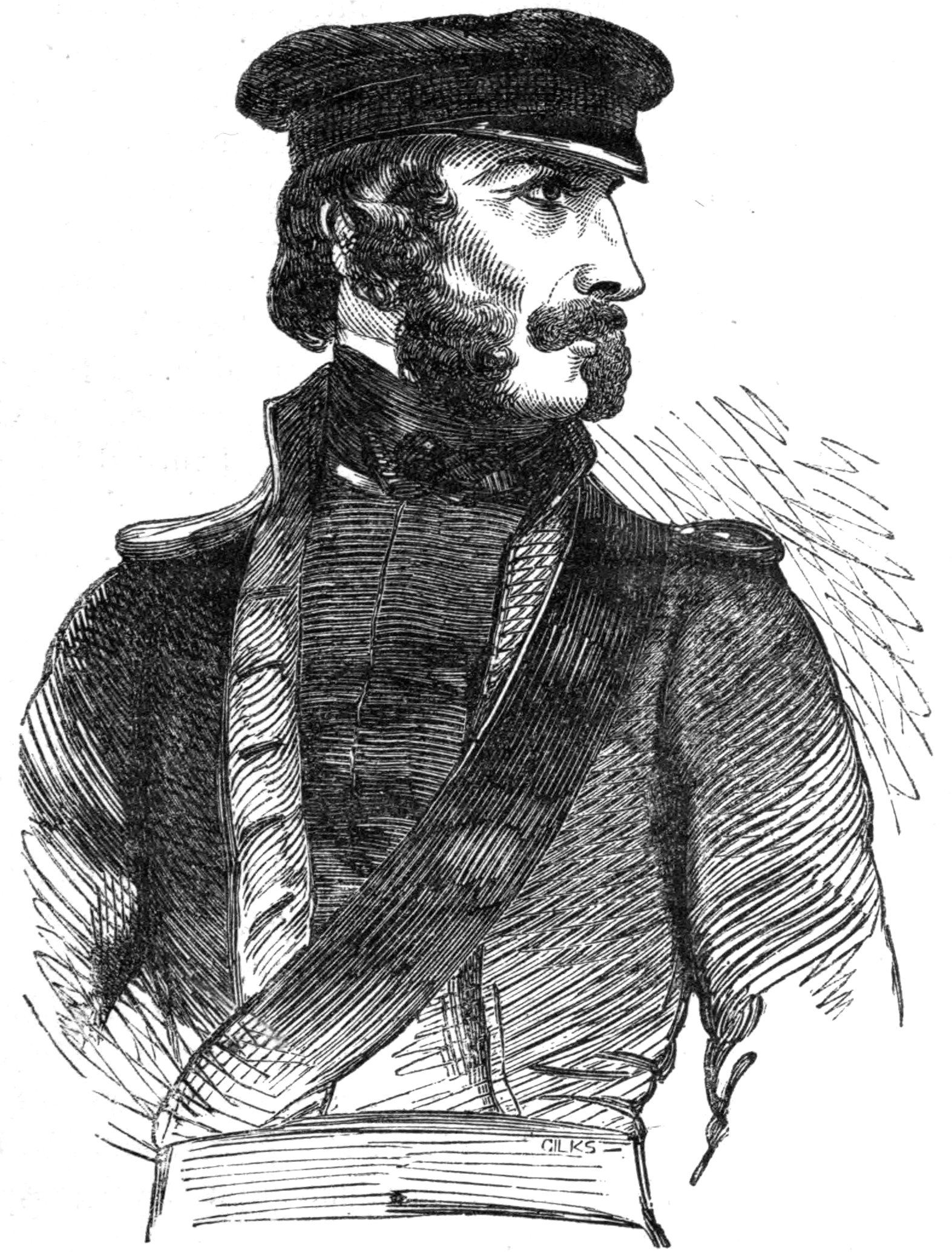
Sketched picture of John Richard Hardy
