= William Lee (Australian politician) =

Australian politician (1794-1870)

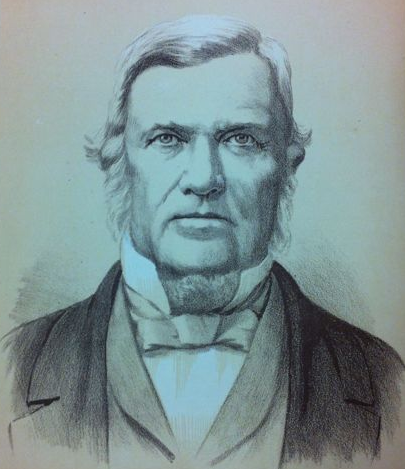

Personal details
- Born: 1 April 1794 Norfolk Island
- Died: 18 November 1870 (aged 76) Kelso, New South Wales

William Lee (1 April 1794 – 18 November 1870), also variously known as William Smith and William Pantoney until 1816, was an Australian pastoralist and politician. He was a member of the New South Wales Legislative Assembly between 1856 and 1860. Lee was a foremost pioneer of British colonisation in New South Wales, being amongst the first white men to take land in the Bathurst, Capertee, Bylong, Bogan and Lachlan River regions.

== Early life ==
Lee was born in the penal settlement of Norfolk Island and was probably the illegitimate child of the convicts, Sarah Smith and William Pantoney. After Pantoney's emancipation, the family lived in Windsor and Lee, an industrious youth, was placed under the patronage of William Cox who took him to the newly colonised area of Bathurst in 1815. In 1818, Governor Macquarie gave Lee a grant of 134 acres of pastoral land near Kelso. Lee named this grant "Wallaroi" and was one of only ten British colonists to receive these first grants of land in the Bathurst district. Lee married Mary Dargin in 1821.

== Squatter and grazier ==
In 1823, during the Bathurst War between the British and the Wiradjuri people, one of Lee's servants was killed by Aborigines at his Clear Creek land acquisition just north of Bathurst. Lee was able to take up land in the Capertee Valley after the British settlers had pursued Aboriginal people into this region on a punitive expedition. This land was soon after given over as a grant to Sir John Jamison and Lee, utilising the information given to him by a local Aboriginal man, took land further north in the Bylong Valley.

In 1828, Lee built the Claremont homestead on his Kelso property which remained in the Lee family until 1922 when it was sold off and subdivided. Lee was a successful pastoralist and at the time of his death had acquired 18,500 acres spread throughout New South Wales. This included the properties of Larras Lake, Condoublin, Bonan, Jemalong, Tabratong, Moora Moora, Willatroy, Warry, Bulgandramine, Genanagie, and Kyangather. Larras Lake is still in possession of the Lee family descendants. Lee is credited with introducing shorthorn cattle to the interior regions of New South Wales.

== Massacre of Aboriginal people ==
In September 1841, nine stockmen of Lee and his pastoralist business partner Joseph Moulder, attempted to appropriate land and set up properties at Duck Creek on the Bogan River. This was in defiance of an 1840 government decree prohibiting graziers from entering this area as it was reserved for Aboriginal use. On 1 October 1841, local Aboriginal men resisted this incursion and killed three stockmen, wounding another three and taking their cattle and supplies. Colonel James Morisset, the police magistrate of the Bathurst region, dispatched an officer and six troopers of the New South Wales Mounted Police to apprehend the Aborigines. Moulder, Lee and their men accompanied the troopers and set out in pursuit as did other parties.

Lee's overseer, Andrew Kerr, led the police and armed settlers to Duck Creek where they came into contact with a group of Aborigines whom they proceeded to shoot and sabre indiscriminately resulting in a massacre killing at least twelve Indigenous people. John James Allman of the Border Police arrived soon after the slaughter and arrested a further two Aboriginal men who were later discharged. Allman regarded Lee as the main cause of the massacre and recommended to the Governor that Lee be deprived of holding any further leases of land in the area. Governor George Gipps did not cancel Lee's ability to take up land but only prevented him from renewing the lease on this particular property at Duck Creek. A petition to the government to withdraw even this minimal punishment was presented on behalf of the colony's powerful squatters by James Macarthur, who invoked divine right and racial superiority as reasons to justify the taking Aboriginal land, saying that "the savage should be compelled to submit himself to that power" of the white man. The petition failed.

== Colonial Parliament ==
In 1856 Lee was elected as the member for Roxburgh in the first New South Wales Legislative Assembly under responsible government. He retained the seat unopposed at the next election in 1858 but then retired from public life. His parliamentary performance was uninspiring and he did not hold office.

== Legacy ==
Pantoney's Crown, a notable sandstone mesa near the Capertee Valley, is named after William Lee (aka William Pantoney). Lee Creek near Bylong is also named in his honour.

New South Wales Legislative Assembly
Preceded by First election	Member for Roxburgh; 1856 – 1859	Succeeded by Seat abolished
