= Ryan Brenan =

Australian politician

Personal details
- Born: 1 January 1798 Ireland
- Died: 5 June 1868 (aged 70) Petersham, New South Wales

John Ryan Brenan (1 January 1798 – 5 June 1868) was an Australian politician and an elected member of the New South Wales Legislative Assembly for 68 days in 1856. He founded, and outlined, the suburb of Smithfield in Sydney. Furthermore, Brenan Park, which is in that suburb, was named after him.

== Early life ==
Brenan was born into a Protestant Anglo-Irish family and trained as a solicitor. He emigrated to Sydney in 1834 and held numerous judicial appointments including Superintendent of Convicts, Coroner, and Police Magistrate. At the same time he established a private legal practice and was the solicitor for the Bank of Australasia. He owned extensive property in Camden and Maitland.

== Colonial Parliament ==
At the first elections for the New South Wales Legislative Assembly after the granting of responsible government in 1856, Brenan was an unsuccessful candidate for the two member seat of Cumberland (South Riding). He was defeated by William Manning and Elias Weekes. However, Weekes had also been a candidate for the seat of Northumberland Boroughs and although initially defeated in that electorate, he successfully contested the result and was declared to be the member. Unable to represent two electorates, Weekes chose to represent Northumberland Boroughs and Brenan was successful at the subsequent Cumberland (South Riding) by-election.

However, his election was overturned by the Elections and Qualifications committee of the Assembly because voting had not occurred in Canterbury. Brenan decided not to contest the subsequent by-election, so that the Colonial Treasurer and former Premier Stuart Donaldson, who had previously been defeated in a by-election in the seat of Sydney Hamlets, could re-enter parliament. Brenan was unsuccessful in the 1857 Cumberland (South Riding) by-election caused by the resignation of William Manning, and in the seat of Hartley at the 1859 election, and he did not stand for further public office.

New South Wales Legislative Assembly
Preceded by Elias Weekes	Member for Cumberland (South Riding); 1856; Served alongside: William Manning	Succeeded by Stuart Donaldson
