= Robert Jamison =

Australian politician

Personal details
- Born: Robert Thomas Jamison; 1 January 1829 Penrith, New South Wales
- Died: 27 January 1878 (aged 49) Maytown, Queensland

Robert Thomas Jamison (1829 – 27 January 1878) was an Australian pastoralist and politician. He was a member of the New South Wales Legislative Assembly from 1856 until 1860.

== Early life ==
Jamison was the grandson of Thomas Jamison a surgeon on the First Fleet and was the son of Sir John Jamison a prominent Sydney physician and one time member of the New South Wales Legislative Council. His mother Mary Griffiths, was one of John Jamison's mistresses with whom se had two sons and five daughters. John Jamison married Mary a few months before his death. Robert was born at the family's extensive estate on the Nepean River and was educated at Sydney College. He inherited a share of his father's estate in 1844 and worked for a short while as he Clerk of the Legislative Council. Jamison acquired extensive pastoral property on the Namoi River and by 1850 was independently wealthy. He was active on the bench of magistrates.

== Colonial Parliament ==
In 1856, at the first election held under responsible self-government, Jamison was elected as one of the two members in the Legislative Assembly for Cook and Westmoreland. He retained the seat unopposed at the next election in 1858 and successfully contested the new seat of Nepean when Cook and Westmoreland was abolished at the 1859 election. He was defeated in 1860 and retired from public life. Jamison did not hold parliamentary or ministerial office.

New South Wales Legislative Assembly
New assembly	Member for Cook and Westmoreland; 1856 – 1859; Served alongside: Martin	District largely replaced by Hartley
New district	Member for Nepean; 1859 – 1860	Succeeded by James Tobias Ryan
