= Electoral district of Wellington and Bligh =

State electoral district of New South Wales, Australia

Wellington and Bligh was an electoral district of the Legislative Assembly in the Australian state of New South Wales, named after Wellington County and Bligh County, and including Mudgee. There were also separate electoral districts of Wellington (County), covering part of Wellington County, and Phillip, Brisbane and Bligh, including part of Bligh County. In 1859, it was largely replaced by Mudgee.

== Members for Wellington and Bligh ==
Member	Party	Period
George Lord	None	1856–1859

== Election results ==
=== 1856 ===
1856 New South Wales colonial election: Wellington and Bligh
Candidate	Votes	%
George Lord (elected)	28	100.0
William Buchanan	0	0.0
Total formal votes	28	100.0
Informal votes	0	0.0
Turnout	28	9.5

Polling was conducted on 16 April 1856. Sitting Legislative Councillor for this district Charles Wray Finch did not contest the election.

=== 1858 ===
1858 New South Wales colonial election: Wellington and Bligh 10 February
Candidate	Votes	%
George Lord (re-elected)	unopposed	
