= John Norton Oxley =

Australian politician

Personal details
- Born: 23 March 1824 Kirkham, New South Wales
- Died: 24 March 1891 (aged 67) Auburn, New South Wales

John Norton Oxley (23 March 1824 – 24 March 1891) was an Australian farmer and politician. He was a member of the New South Wales Legislative Assembly for one term between 1856 and 1857.

== Early life ==
Oxley was the eldest son of the noted explorer and colonial surveyor-general, John Oxley. He was educated at The King's School, Parramatta and undertook a grand tour of Europe between 1842 and 1845. On his return to Australia he farmed his father's property "Kirkham Estate" initially growing lucerne but later converting to cereal crops. Together with his brother and fellow parliamentarian, Henry Oxley, he received a government grant of 5,000 acres in the Camden area.

== Colonial Parliament ==
In 1856 Oxley was elected unopposed as one of the two members for Western Division of Camden in the first New South Wales Legislative Assembly under responsible government. His parliamentary performance was uninspiring and he did not hold office. He was defeated at the next election in 1858. One further attempt to re-enter parliament in 1859 for the district of Narellan was also unsuccessful.

== Spouse ==
Oxley married Ann Lydia (Platt) at Morpeth on 26 May 1851, they had one child before she died at Morpeth NSW 9 September 1852. He married Harriet Jane (Hassall) at Narellan on 15 February 1854 and had five daughters and three sons.

New South Wales Legislative Assembly
Preceded by First election	Member for West Camden; 1856 – 1857; Served alongside: James Macarthur	Succeeded by William Wild
