= Electoral district of Roxburgh =

State electoral district of New South Wales, Australia

Roxburgh was an electoral district of the Legislative Assembly in the Australian state of New South Wales from 1856 to 1859, named after Roxburgh County. It included Sofala. For the 1859 election the district divided, principally the northern portion in Hartley and the south western portion in East Macquarie.

== Members for Roxburgh ==
Member	Party	Term
William Lee	None	1856–1859

== Election results ==
=== 1856 ===
1856 New South Wales colonial election: Roxburgh
Candidate	Votes	%
William Lee (elected)	136	44.2
William Suttor	114	37.0
William Cummings	58	18.8
Total formal votes	308	100.0
Informal votes	0	0.0
Turnout	308	43.8

Polling was conducted on 8 April 1856. Suttor had served in the old Legislative Council as the elected member for Counties of Roxburgh, Phillip and Wellington from 1843 to 1851, then as the elected member for Counties of Roxburgh and Wellington from 1851 to 1854. The sitting Legislative Councillor, Saul Samuel contested Wellington (County).

=== 1858 ===
1858 New South Wales colonial election: Roxburgh 2 February
Candidate	Votes	%
William Lee (re-elected)	unopposed	
