= Electoral district of Bathurst (County) =

Electoral district of New South Wales (1856–1859)

Bathurst (County) New South Wales—Legislative Assembly
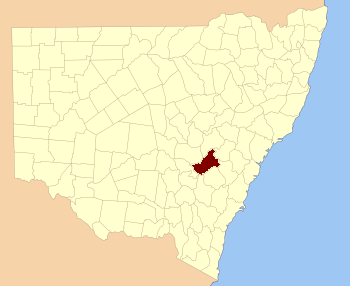
- Location in modern New South Wales
- State: New South Wales
- Created: 1856
- Abolished: 1859
- Namesake: Bathurst County
- Coordinates: 33°30′S 149°30′E

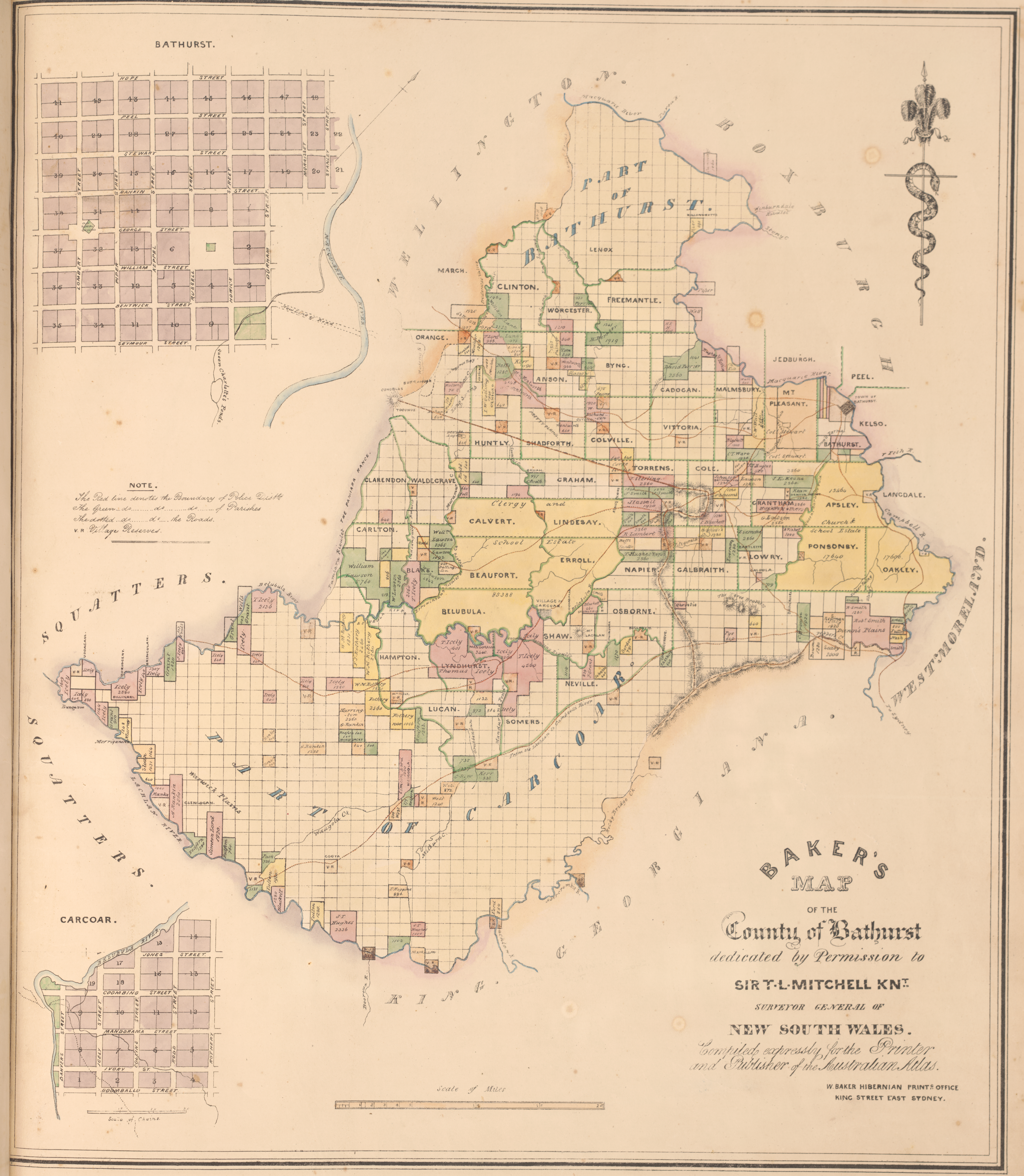
Bathurst county in the 1840s

Bathurst (County) was an electoral district of the Legislative Assembly in the Australian state of New South Wales, named after Bathurst County and including the rural part of the county. The electorate did not include the town of Bathurst which was included in Western Boroughs, until Bathurst was created in 1859. Bathurst (County) was replaced by Carcoar, East Macquarie and West Macquarie in 1859.

John Plunkett was elected as the member for both Bathurst (County) and Argyle. Plunkett was sworn in as member for Argyle and Bathurst on 22 May 1856, before submitting his resignation from Bathurst on 29 May, stating that the rules of the House would not allow him to send in his resignation earlier.

== Members for Bathurst (County) ==
Member	Party	Period
John Plunkett	None	Mar–May 1856
William Suttor	None	Jun 1856–1859

== Election results ==
1858 New South Wales colonial election: Bathurst (County) 25 January
Candidate	Votes	%
William Suttor (re-elected)	unopposed	
