= James Dickson (New South Wales politician) =

Australian politician (1813–1863)

Personal details
- Born: 1 January 1813 Scotland
- Died: 28 April 1863 (aged 50) Newtown, New South Wales

James Dickson (1813 – 28 April 1863) was an Australian politician and a member of the New South Wales Legislative Assembly from 1857 until his death.

== Early life ==
Dickson was born in Scotland and was the son of a farmer. After an elementary education he trained as a tailor and came to Australia as an assisted immigrant in 1838. On arrival he established a successful general store in Maitland and also accrued significant pastoral interests.

== New South Wales Parliament ==
Dickson was a member of the first New South Wales Legislative Assembly which was convened after the establishment of responsible self-government in 1856. He was elected for the two-member seat of Northumberland Boroughs at a by-election in November 1857 which was caused by the death of the incumbent member, Bob Nichols. Dickson retained the seat, unopposed, at the 1858 election, but the electorate was abolished prior to the next election in 1859. At that election, Dickson was an unsuccessful candidate at East Maitland, and Patrick's Plains. He re-entered parliament as the member for East Maitland following the 1859 by-election caused by the resignation of the incumbent Joseph Chambers who had accepted a position as Crown Prosecutor in the Western Districts of New South Wales. Dickson retained this seat at the 1860 election, until his death in 1863. He did not attain ministerial or parliamentary office.

New South Wales Legislative Assembly
Preceded by Bob Nichols	Member for Northumberland Boroughs; 1857 – 1859; Served alongside: Weekes	Succeeded by Seat Abolished
Preceded by Joseph Chambers	Member for East Maitland; 1859 – 1863	Succeeded by John Darvall
