= Bourn Russell =

British–Australian mariner, pastoralist, politician and businessman

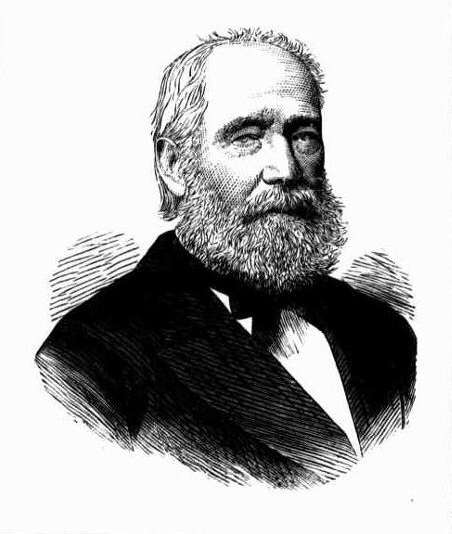

Personal details
- Born: 1 December 1794 Rye, East Sussex
- Died: 4 July 1880 (aged 85) Sydney
- Occupation: Master mariner, storekeeper, pastoralist and politician

Bourn Russell (1 December 1794 – 4 July 1880) was a British/Australian mariner, pastoralist, politician and businessman. He was a member of the New South Wales Legislative Council between 1858 and 1880. He was also a member of the New South Wales Legislative Assembly for four months in 1856.

== Early life ==
Russell was born at Rye, East Sussex, on 1 December 1794. His father was Bourn Russell senior, a merchant sea captain, and his wife, Hannah nee Chandler. His father was killed at sea in 1800 when Bourn was a boy. He received an elementary education at the Free Grammar School in Rye and was apprenticed to sea in the coal trade at age 15. He was 2nd mate on a vessel trading to the Mediterranean when he was pressed into service on a British naval warship during the Napoleonic Wars. On discharge from the navy he resumed his career as a merchant mariner and was soon a master of sailing vessels. On turning 21 years of age he inherited his father's estate, that included the family home. This he sold and used the money to become part owner of the ship Lady Rowena (352 tons) built at Montreal in 1825.

== In Australia ==
=== Master mariner ===
Lady Rowena was serving as a convict transport under the command of Russell when she reached Sydney in May 1826. It was noted in the press the 100 female convicts aboard were landed in good health. Lady Rowena returned to Britain and again sailed to Australia, this time on a trading voyage, arriving Hobart in November 1828. Captain Russell came to Australia again on the same ship, arriving Sydney with a general cargo in August 1830, this time intending to stay.

He commanded the Lady Rowena on two deep-sea whaling voyages from Sydney between 1830 and 1835. Among the crewmen aboard were two of his sons, William and Bourn junior, serving as apprentice seamen. During these voyages he surveyed the Solomon Islands and in 1835 he published the result in an early map of that group of islands. He also surveyed parts of the coast of northern Japan, Sakhalin Island, the Louisiade Archipelago, Dampier Strait and New Guinea. In March 1831, Captain Russell and his crew landed on the coast of Japan, possibly the first Australians to do so.

=== Businessman ===
Russell had established his family in New South Wales by 1834. In the early 1840s he developed pastoral interests and settled in Maitland where he became a storekeeper. He was bankrupted in the recession of the late 1840s. He restored his fortunes by establishing a boiling-down works near Maitland to produce tallow for export to Britain.

By 1855 he was chairman of the Hunter River New Steam Navigation Company.

He and his wife had 5 sons and 2 daughters. His fourth son, Henry Russell, became the New South Wales government astronomer. His illegitimate son William Watson was a member of the New South Wales Legislative Assembly from 1874 to 1877.

=== Parliamentarian ===
Russell was elected as the member for Northumberland Boroughs at the first election held in New South Wales under responsible government. He was the second candidate, after Bob Nichols, to be elected for the two member seat and he defeated the next candidate, Elias Weekes, by 8 votes. However the election was contested on the grounds that more than 20 people who were unqualified to vote had voted for Russell. After investigating this claim, the Legislative Assembly's Committee of Elections and Qualifications overturned the result and awarded the seat to Weekes in a re-count. Russell was unsuccessful in an attempt to regain the seat at the 1857 by-election caused by the death of Nichols. Following this defeat he accepted an appointment to the Legislative Council initially for a fixed term expiring in 1861 and then as a life member. He did not hold a ministerial or parliamentary position.

He died in Sydney on 4 July 1880 and is buried in Rookwood Cemetery.

New South Wales Legislative Assembly
New assembly	Member for Northumberland Boroughs; 1856; With: Bob Nichols	Succeeded by Elias Weekes
