= Bob Nichols (Australian politician) =

Australian politician (1809–1857)

Auditor-General of New South Wales
- In office 6 June 1856 – 25 August 1856
- Preceded by: Francis Merewether
- Succeeded by: Terence Murray

Secretary for Lands and Works
- In office 6 June 1856 – 25 August 1856
- Preceded by: New ministerial title
- Succeeded by: Terence Murray

Personal details
- Born: George Robert Nichols; 27 September 1809 Sydney, Australia
- Died: 12 September 1857 (aged 47) Sydney, Australia
- Spouses: Eliza Boggs (m. 1831; d. 1835); Susannah Eliza Barnes (m. 1837; d. 1846); Eliza Smith (m. 1854)
- Relations: Esther Abrahams (grandmother)
- Parent: Isaac Nichols (father)

George Robert Nichols (27 September 1809 – 12 September 1857), also known as Bob Nichols, was an Australian politician, a member of the New South Wales Legislative Council between 1848 and 1856. He was also a member of the inaugural New South Wales Legislative Assembly for one term from 1856 until his death.

== Early life ==
Nichols was the second son of Isaac Nichols, a former convict who became a successful Sydney businessman and the first postmaster in the colony, and Rosanna Abrahams, daughter of Esther Johnston (also known as Esther Abrahams or Esther Julian). Shortly before his father's death in 1819, Bob Nichols was sent to England for an education and returned to Sydney early in 1823.

On returning to Australia he worked as an articled clerk until he was admitted as the first native-born Australian solicitor on 1 July 1833. Nichols founded the law firm Clayton Utz in February 1833. During this period he was also a journalist and editor of William Wentworth's newspaper The Australian. He was bankrupted in the financial crisis of 1842 but later returned to his legal practice. Nichols was a member of the Parramatta Regional Council, a trustee of Sydney Grammar School and a leading Freemason.

Among the pupils articled to Nichols were James Martin (afterwards Premier and Chief Justice of New South Wales) and Richard Dry (afterwards Premier of Tasmania). Nichols was conceded the privilege, enjoyed by no other practitioner of his grade, of appearing professionally in both the superior and inferior courts of the colony.

== Political career ==
In 1848, prior to the establishment of responsible self-government, Nichols was elected to the semi-elected unicameral Legislative Council. He represented the electorate of Northumberland Boroughs (including Morpeth, West Maitland and East Maitland) until the granting of responsible self-government in 1856. At the first election under the new constitution he was elected to the Legislative Assembly as one of the two members for Northumberland Boroughs and continued to represent the seat until his death on 12 September 1857. Throughout his parliamentary career he was a strong supporter of Wentworth and William Bland.

Nichols served as the Auditor General and as the Secretary for Lands and Works, the inaugural such roles in the first responsible self-government in New South Wales. He held these positions for 80 days in the government of Stuart Donaldson.

== Personal life ==
Nichols married Eliza Boggs on 23 March 1831 and they had son, also called George Robert (1830–1832), and a daughter, Georgiana Eliza (1832–1921). Eliza Boggs died on 16 February 1835 (aged 22).

He married Susannah Eliza Barnes on 16 December 1837 and they had a son, Francis Stephen (1840–1893). Susannah Eliza died on 12 November 1846 (aged 30).

Nichols married for a third time, this time to 18-year old Eliza Smith on 14 July 1854.

He died from dropsy on 12 September 1857 (aged 47). and was survived by Eliza (who died on 21 July 1863, aged 27) and by two children.

New South Wales Legislative Council
Preceded by Patrick Grant	Member for Northumberland Boroughs; 1848 – 1856	Council replaced
New South Wales Legislative Assembly
New assembly	Member for Northumberland Boroughs; 1856 – 1857; With: Bourn Russell / Elias Weekes	Succeeded by James Dickson
Political offices
Preceded by Francis Merewether	Auditor-General of New South Wales; 1856	Succeeded by Terence Murray
New office	Secretary for Lands and Works; 1856	Succeeded by Terence Murray
