= Electoral district of Wellington (County) =

Former electoral district of an Australian state (1856–1859)

Wellington (County) was an electoral district of the Legislative Assembly in the Australian state of New South Wales, created in 1856 and named after Wellington County and including Wellington. There was also a separate Wellington and Bligh, covering part of Wellington County. In 1859, it was largely replaced by Wellington.

== Members for Wellington (County) ==
Member	Party	Period
George Cox	None	1856–1859

== Election results ==
=== 1856 ===
1856 New South Wales colonial election: Wellington (County)
Candidate	Votes	%
George Cox (elected)	191	63.2
Saul Samuel	111	36.6
Total formal votes	302	100.0
Informal votes	0	0.0
Turnout	302	50.9

Polling was conducted on 10 April 1856. Samuel represented Counties of Roxburgh and Wellington in the old Legislative Council.

=== 1858 ===
1858 New South Wales colonial election: Wellington (County) 5 February 1858
Candidate	Votes	%
George Cox (re-elected)	unopposed	
