= Electoral district of King and Georgiana =

Former state electoral district of New South Wales, Australia

King and Georgiana was an electoral district of the Legislative Assembly in the Australian state of New South Wales from 1856 to 1859, named after King and Georgiana counties, including Yass and Taralga. Its only member was Peter Faucett. It was largely replaced by the electoral district of Yass Plains in 1859.

== Members for King and Georgiana ==
Member	Party	Term
Peter Faucett	None	1856–1859

== Election results ==
=== 1856 ===
1856 New South Wales colonial election: King and Georgiana
Candidate	Votes	%
Peter Faucett (elected)	199	71.6
Isaac Shepherd	79	28.4
Total formal votes	278	100.0
Informal votes	0	0.0
Turnout	278	43.9

Polling was conducted on 7 April 1856. James Chisholm, the member of the Legislative Council for Counties of King and Georgiana, did not contest the election.

=== 1858 ===
1858 New South Wales colonial election: King and Georgiana 8 February
Candidate	Votes	%
Peter Faucett (re-elected)	unopposed	
