= Electoral districts of New South Wales =

The New South Wales Legislative Assembly is elected from single-member electorates called districts, returning 93 members since the 1999 election. Prior to 1927 some districts returned multiple members, including 1920-1927 when all districts returned three, four or five members. Parramatta is the only district to have continuously existed since the establishment of the Assembly in 1856.

Electorate	Created	Abolished	Comments
Current districts as of 2023
Albury	1880	1920	
Albury	1927		
Auburn	1927		
Badgerys Creek	1991	1999	
Badgerys Creek	2023		
Ballina	1894	1904	
Ballina	1988		
Balmain	1880	1894	2 members from 1882 to 1885; 3 members 1885–1889; 4 members 1889–1894
Balmain	1904	1991	5 members 1920-1927
Balmain	2007		
Bankstown	1927		
Barwon	1894	1904	
Barwon	1927		
Bathurst	1859		3 members 1920-1927
Bega	1894	1920	
Bega	1988		
Blacktown	1941		
Blue Mountains	1968		
Cabramatta	1981		
Camden	1859	1920	2 members 1859-1889; 3 members 1889-1894
Camden	1981		
Campbelltown	1968		
Canterbury	1859	1920	2 members 1859-1892 3 members 1882-1885; 4 members 1885-1894
Canterbury	1927		
Castle Hill	2007		
Cessnock	1913	1920	
Cessnock	1927		
Charlestown	1971		
Clarence	1859	1920	
Clarence	1927		
Coffs Harbour	1981		
Coogee	1927		
Cootamundra	1904	1941	3 members 1920-1927
Cootamundra	2015		
Cronulla	1959		
Davidson	1971		
Drummoyne	1913		
Dubbo	1894	1904	
Dubbo	1930		
East Hills	1953		
Epping	1999		
Fairfield	1953		
Gosford	1950		
Goulburn	1859	1991	3 members 1920-1927
Goulburn	2007		
Granville	1894	1920	
Granville	1927		
Hawkesbury	1859	1920	2 members 1859-1880
Hawkesbury	1927		
Heathcote	1971	1991	
Heathcote	1999		
Heffron	1973		
Holsworthy	2015		
Hornsby	1927	1991	
Hornsby	1999		
Keira	1988		
Kellyville	2023		
Kiama	1859	1904	
Kiama	1981		
Kogarah	1930		
Lake Macquarie	1950		
Lane Cove	1904	1913	
Lane Cove	1927		
Leppington	2023		
Lismore	1894	1904	
Lismore	1913	1920	
Lismore	1927		
Liverpool	1950		
Londonderry	1988		
Macquarie Fields	1988	1991	
Macquarie Fields	1999		
Maitland	1904		3 members 1920-1927
Manly	1927		
Maroubra	1950		
Miranda	1971		
Monaro	1856	1920	Known as Maneroo 1856-1857
Monaro	1927		
Mount Druitt	1971	1981	
Mount Druitt	1991		
Murray	1859	1999	2 members 1880-1894 3 members 1920-1927
Murray	2015		
Myall Lakes	1988		
Newcastle	1859	1894	3 members 1889-1894
Newcastle	1904		5 members 1920-1927
Newtown	1859	1894	3 members 1885-1891 4 members 1891-1894
Newtown	1904	1950	
Newtown	2015		
North Shore	1920	1927	5 members 1920-1927
North Shore	1981		
Northern Tablelands	1920	1927	3 members 1920-1927
Northern Tablelands	1981		
Oatley	1927	1930	
Oatley	2007		
Orange	1859	1920	2 members 1880-1894
Orange	1927		
Oxley	1920	1988	3 members 1920-1927
Oxley	1991		
Parramatta	1856		2 members 1859-1880 3 Members 1920-1927
Penrith	1973		
Pittwater	1973		
Port Macquarie	1988		
Port Stephens	1988		
Prospect	2015		
Riverstone	1981		
Rockdale	1927	1930	
Rockdale	1941		
Ryde	1894	1904	
Ryde	1913	1968	5 members 1920-1927
Ryde	1981	1991	
Ryde	1999		
Shellharbour	2007		
South Coast	1927		
Strathfield	1988		
Summer Hill	2015		
Swansea	1981		
Sydney	1920	1927	5 members
Sydney	2007		
Tamworth	1880	1920	2 members 1880-1894
Tamworth	1927		
Terrigal	2007		
The Entrance	1988		
Tweed	1894	1904	
Tweed	1999		
Upper Hunter	1859	1894	2 members 1880-1894
Upper Hunter	1904	1920	
Upper Hunter	1927		
Vaucluse	1927		
Wagga Wagga	1894	1904	
Wagga Wagga	1913	1920	
Wagga Wagga	1927		
Wahroonga	2021		Created from Ku-ring-gai in a redistribution in 2021.
Wakehurst	1962		
Wallsend	1894	1904	
Wallsend	1917	1920	
Wallsend	1927	1930	
Wallsend	1968		
Willoughby	1894	1920	
Willoughby	1927	1988	
Willoughby	1991		
Winston Hills	2023		
Wollondilly	1904	1981	3 members 1920-1927
Wollondilly	2007		
Wollongong	1904	1920	
Wollongong	1927	1930	
Wollongong	1968		
Wyong	1962	1973	
Wyong	1988		
Former districts
Alexandria	1904	1920	
Alexandria	1927	1930	
Allowrie	1904	1920	
Alma	1894	1904	
Annandale	1894	1920	
Annandale	1927	1950	
Argyle	1856	1904	
Armidale	1894	1920	
Armidale	1927	1981	
Arncliffe	1930	1941	
Ashburnham	1894	1920	
Ashburnham	1927	1950	
Ashfield	1894	1920	
Ashfield	1927	1959	
Ashfield	1968	1999	
Ashfield-Croydon	1959	1968	
Balmain North	1894	1901	
Balmain South	1894	1901	
Balranald	1859	1894	
Bass Hill	1962	1991	
Bathurst (County)	1856	1859	
Baulkham Hills	1991	2023	
Belmore	1904	1920	
Belubula	1904	1913	
Bingara	1894	1920	
Blayney	1904	1913	
Bligh	1962	2007	
Bogan	1859	1894	
Bondi	1913	1920	
Bondi	1927	1971	
Boorowa	1880	1904	spelt "Booroowa" 1899–1901
Botany	1894	1950	
Bourke	1880	1904	
Bowral	1894	1904	
Braidwood	1859	1904	
Brisbane	1859	1859	Queensland
Broken Hill	1894	1913	
Broken Hill	1968	1999	
Bulli	1930	1971	
Bulli	1991	1997	
Burnett	1859	1859	Queensland
Burrangong	1904	1920	
Burragorang	1988	1991	
Burrendong	1968	1981	
Burrinjuck	1950	2015	
Burwood	1894	1920	
Burwood	1927	1988	
Byron	1913	1988	
Camperdown	1904	1920	
Carcoar	1859	1894	
Carlingford	1988	1991	
Casino	1930	1968	
Casino	1971	1981	
Castlereagh	1904	1920	
Castlereagh	1927	1991	
Central Cumberland	1859	1894	
Clarence and Darling Downs	1856	1859	
Clyde	1904	1913	
Cobar	1894	1920	
Cobar	1932	1949	
Cobar	1965	1968	
Collaroy	1950	1973	
Concord	1930	1968	
Condoublin	1894	1904	
Cook and Westmoreland	1856	1859	
Cook's River	1941	1973	
Coonamble	1894	1904	
Corrimal	1968	1988	
Corowa	1904	1920	
Corowa	1927	1950	
Cowra	1894	1904	
Croydon	1927	1959	
Cumberland	1920	1927	3 members
Cumberland Boroughs	1856	1859	
Cumberland (North Riding)	1856	1859	
Cumberland (South Riding)	1856	1859	
Darling	1904	1913	
Darling Downs	1859	1859	Queensland
Darling Harbour	1904	1920	
Darlinghurst	1904	1920	
Darlinghurst	1950	1953	
Darlington	1894	1904	
Deniliquin	1894	1913	
Dulwich Hill	1913	1920	
Dulwich Hill	1927	1968	
Durham	1856	1859	3 members
Durham	1880	1920	
Earlwood	1950	1991	
East Camden	1858	1859	
Eastern Division of Camden	1856	1857	
Eastern Suburbs	1920	1927	5 members
East Maitland	1859	1904	
East Macquarie	1859	1894	2 members
East Morton	1859	1859	Queensland
East Sydney	1859	1894	4 members
Eastwood	1927	1930	
Eastwood	1950	1999	
Eden	1859	1904	Called Eden-Bombala 1894-1904
Elizabeth	1981	1988	
Enmore	1913	1920	
Enmore	1927	1930	
Ermington	1991	1999	
Forbes	1880	1894	2 members
Fuller	1968	1981	
Georges River	1930	2007	
Gladesville	1981	1999	
Glebe	1859	1920	
Glebe	1927	1941	
Glen Innes	1880	1904	
Gloucester	1880	1920	
Gloucester	1927	1988	
Gloucester and Macquarie	1856	1859	
Goldfields North	1859	1880	
Goldfields South	1859	1880	
Goldfields West	1859	1880	
Gordon	1904	1920	
Gordon	1927	1999	
Gough	1904	1920	
Grafton	1880	1904	
Grenfell	1880	1904	
Gundagai	1880	1904	
Gunnedah	1880	1904	
Gwydir	1859	1894	
Gwydir	1904	1920	
Hamilton	1927	1971	
Hartley	1859	1920	
Hartley	1927	1968	
Hastings	1859	1880	
Hastings and Manning	1880	1894	2 members
Hastings and Macleay	1894	1920	
Hay	1894	1904	
Hume	1859	1904	
Hunter	1859	1894	
Hurstville	1913	1920	
Hurstville	1927	1999	
Illawarra	1859	1904	
Illawarra	1927	1968	
Illawarra	1971	2007	
Ingleburn	1981	1988	
Inverell	1880	1904	
Ipswich	1859	1859	Queensland
Kahibah	1894	1920	
Kahibah	1927	1930	
Kahibah	1950	1971	
Kembla	1968	1971	
King	1904	1920	
King	1927	1973	
King and Georgiana	1856	1859	
Kirribilli	1962	1981	
Kurri Kurri	1927	1968	
Ku-ring-gai	1973	2021	Largely replaced by the electoral division of Wahroonga.
Lachlan	1859	1880	
Lachlan	1894	1920	
Lachlan	1927	2007	
Lachlan and Lower Darling	1856	1859	
Lakemba	1927	2023	
Leichhardt	1894	1920	
Leichhardt	1927	1962	
Leichhardt, Queensland	1859	1859	Queensland
Liverpool Plains	1859	1880	
Liverpool Plains	1904	1920	
Liverpool Plains	1927	1962	
Liverpool Plains and Gwydir	1856	1859	
Lower Hunter	1859	1880	
Lyndhurst	1913	1920	
Macleay	1880	1894	
Macquarie	1894	1920	
Manning	1894	1904	
Manning	1988	1991	
Marrickville	1894	1920	
Marrickville	1927	2015	
McKell	1988	1991	
Menai	1999	2015	
Merrylands	1959	1962	
Merrylands	1968	1988	
Middle Harbour	1904	1920	
Middle Harbour	1988	1991	
Minchinbury	1988	1991	
Molong	1880	1904	
Moorebank	1991	1999	
Moree	1894	1904	
Moreton, Wide Bay, Burnett and Maranoa	1856	1857	Queensland
Morpeth	1859	1894	
Moruya	1894	1904	
Mosman	1913	1920	
Mosman	1927	1991	
Mudgee	1859	1920	
Mudgee	1927	1968	
Mulgoa	1988	1991	
Mulgoa	1999		
Munmorah	1973	1981	
Murray-Darling	1999	2015	
Murrumbidgee	1856	2015	
Murwillumbah	1988	1999	
Namoi	1880	1894	
Namoi	1904	1950	
Narellan	1859	1880	
Narrabri	1894	1904	
Nepean	1859	1904	
Nepean	1927	1981	
Neutral Bay	1927	1962	
Newcastle East	1894	1904	
Newcastle West	1894	1904	
New England	1859	1894	
New England and Macleay	1856	1859	
Newtown-Annandale	1950	1953	
Newtown-Camperdown	1894	1904	
Newtown-Erskine	1894	1904	
Newtown-St Peters	1894	1904	
Northcott	1968	1999	
North Eastern Boroughs	1856	1859	
North Sydney	1927	1962	
Northumberland	1859	1913	
Northumberland and Hunter	1856	1859	
Northumberland Boroughs	1856	1859	
Paddington	1859	1920	
Paddington	1927	1959	
Paddington-Waverley	1959	1962	
Patrick's Plains	1859	1894	
Paterson	1859	1880	
Peats	1973	2007	
Petersham	1894	1920	
Petersham	1930	1941	
Phillip	1904	1920	
Phillip	1927	1981	
Phillip, Brisbane and Bligh	1856	1859	
Port Jackson	1991	2007	
Pyrmont	1904	1913	
Queanbeyan	1859	1913	
Quirindi	1894	1904	
Raleigh	1894	1920	
Raleigh	1927	1981	
Randwick	1894	1920	
Randwick	1927	1971	
Redfern	1880	1920	
Redfern	1927	1968	
Richmond	1880	1913	
Robertson	1894	1904	
Rous	1894	1913	
Roxburgh	1856	1859	
Rozelle	1904	1920	
Rozelle	1927	1930	
Rylstone	1894	1904	
St George	1894	1930	
St Leonards	1859	1920	
St Marys	1981	1999	
St Vincent	1856	1859	
Seven Hills	1981	1991	
Seven Hills	2015	2023	
Sherbrooke	1894	1913	
Shoalhaven	1859	1904	
Singleton	1894	1920	
Smithfield	1988	2015	
Southern Boroughs	1856	1859	
Southern Highlands	1988	2007	
South Sydney	1880	1894	4 Members
Stanley Boroughs	1856	1859	Queensland
Stanley County	1856	1859	Queensland
Sturt	1889	1968	3 Members 1920-1927
Sturt	1971	1980	
Surry Hills	1904	1920	
Surry Hills	1927	1930	
Sutherland	1950	1971	
Sutherland	1988	1999	
Sydney City	1856	1857	
Sydney-Belmore	1894	1904	
Sydney-Bligh	1894	1904	
Sydney-Cook	1894	1904	
Sydney-Denison	1894	1904	
Sydney-Fitzroy	1894	1904	
Sydney-Flinders	1894	1904	
Sydney-Gipps	1894	1904	
Sydney Hamlets	1856	1859	2 members
Sydney-King	1894	1904	
Sydney-Lang	1894	1904	
Sydney-Phillip	1894	1904	
Sydney-Pyrmont	1894	1904	
Temora	1927	1981	
Tenterfield	1859	1920	
Tenterfield	1927	1981	
The Hills	1962	2007	
Toongabbie	2007	2015	
Tuggerah	1981	1988	
Tumut	1859	1904	
University of Sydney	1876	1880	
United Counties of Murray and St Vincent	1856	1859	
United Pastoral Districts of Moreton, Wide Bay, Burnett, Maranoa, Leichhardt and Port Curtis	1858	1859	Queensland
Uralla-Walcha	1894	1904	
Wammerawa	1920	1927	
Waratah	1894	1913	
Waratah	1930	1999	
Warringah	1894	1904	
Waterloo	1894	1904	
Waverley	1894	1920	
Waverley	1927	1959	
Waverley	1971	1991	
Wellington	1859	1904	
Wellington and Bligh	1856	1859	
Wellington (County)	1856	1859	
Wentworth	1880	1904	
Wentworthville	1962	1991	
Wentworthville	1999	2007	
West Camden	1858	1859	
Western Division of Camden	1856	1857	
West Macquarie	1859	1904	
West Maitland	1859	1904	
West Moreton	1859	1859	Queensland
West Sydney	1859	1894	4 members
Western Boroughs	1856	1859	
Western Suburbs	1920	1927	5 members
Wickham	1894	1920	
Wilcannia	1894	1904	
Williams	1859	1880	
Willyama	1913	1920	
Windsor	1859	1880	
Wollombi	1859	1894	
Wollongong-Kembla	1941	1968	
Woollahra	1894	1962	
Woronora	1894	1904	
Woronora	1973	1988	
Wynyard	1904	1913	
Yaralla	1968	1981	
Yass	1894	1920	
Yass	1930	1950	
Yass Plains	1859	1894	
Young	1880	1904	
Young	1927	1981	
