= James Macarthur (politician) =

Australian politician

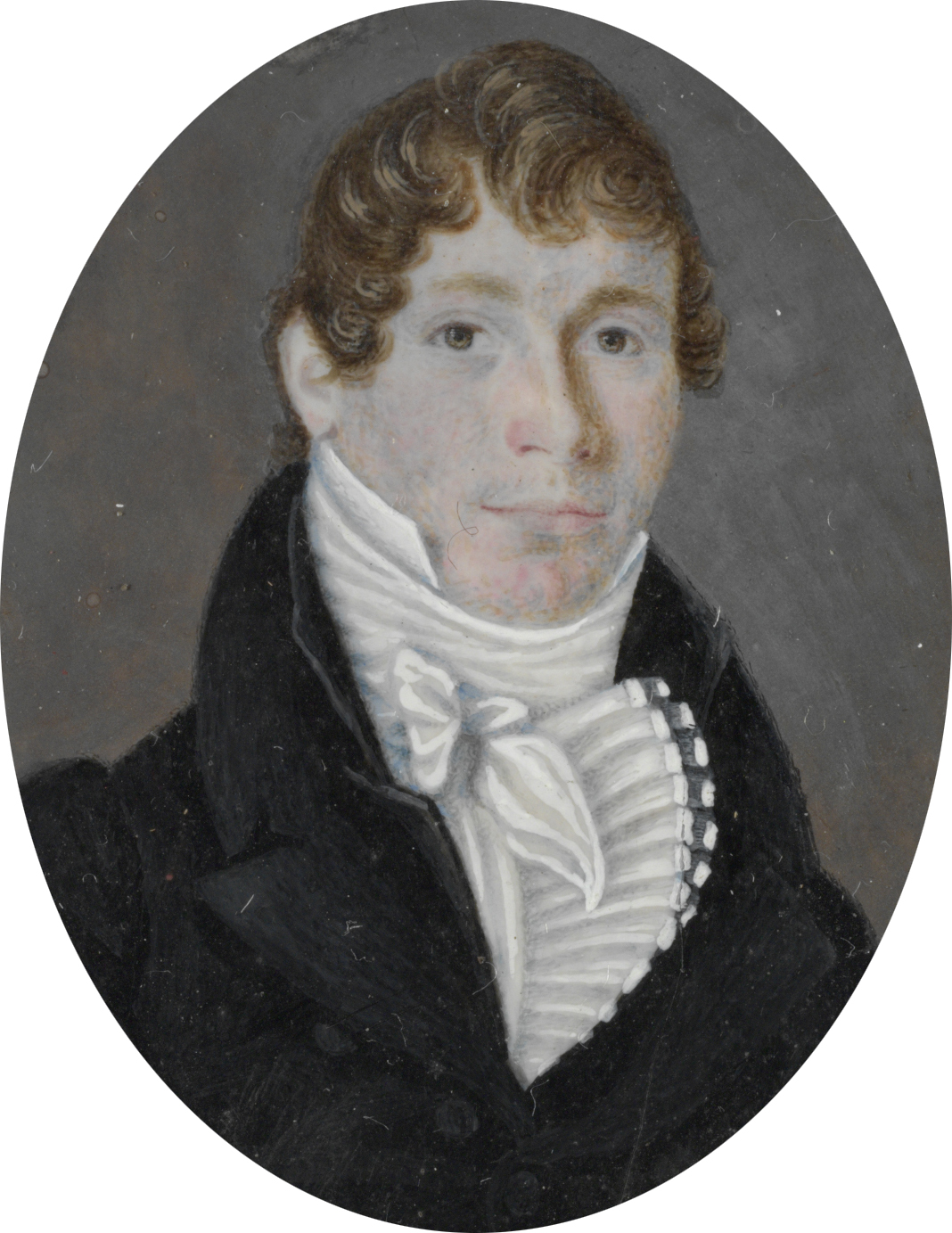
- James Macarthur c. 1820

Personal details
- Born: 15 December 1798 Elizabeth Farm, Parramatta, Colony of New South Wales
- Died: 21 April 1867 (aged 68) Camden Park Estate, New South Wales
- Spouse: Emily Stone (m. 1838)
- Children: Elizabeth Macarthur
- Parents: John Macarthur (father); Elizabeth Macarthur (mother)
- Relatives: Edward, John, William, Emmeline, and Elizabeth (siblings); James Macarthur-Onslow (grandson)
- Occupation: Politician; pastoralist

James Macarthur (15 December 1798 – 21 April 1867) was an Australian pastoralist and politician. He was a member of the New South Wales Legislative Council on three occasions between 1839 and 1843, 1848 and 1856 and finally from 1866 until his death. He was also a member of the New South Wales Legislative Assembly between 1856 and 1859.

== Early life and education ==
James Macarthur was born in Parramatta on 15 December 1798, was the fourth son of John Macarthur and his wife Elizabeth. He was initially privately educated in Parramatta, but accompanied his father to England in 1809 in the aftermath of the Rum Rebellion. He stayed in Europe throughout his father's exile and completed his education in Hackney before undertaking a grand tour.

On arriving back in the colony of New South Wales in 1817, he was given responsibility for managing his father's Camden estates. He did this assiduously and greatly increased the family's wealth and property during the next 10 years. On John Macarthur's death in April 1834, James and one of his brothers, William, were bequeathed Camden Park Estate as tenants in common.

== Business ==
Macarthur was also a director of numerous colonial companies, including the failing Australian Agricultural Company. During two trips to England between 1827 and 1832 and in 1837–38, he improved the company's affairs and did much to promote the New South Wales. He was a financial backer of The Australian newspaper by mid-1843 and was, briefly, the owner. He significantly influenced the development of the town of Camden and St Johns Anglican Church, Camden.

== Political career ==
=== Colonial Parliament ===
Macarthur was first appointed to the Legislative Council when it was a fully nominated house on 24 October 1839. At the first election for the council after the reforms of 1842, he unsuccessfully contested the seat of County of Cumberland. After the failure of this election campaign he refused a nomination to the house but re-entered it is as the member for County of Camden after winning that seat at the election of 1848. He retained this seat until responsible self-government was granted in 1856. At the first election under the new constitution he was elected to the Legislative Assembly as one of the two members for West Camden and he continued to represent this seat until he retired from public life at the 1859 election. Macarthur was granted a life appointment to the Legislative Council on 24 July 1866.

=== Political philosophy ===
After coming to maturity in the post-Napoleonic era, Macarthur developed conservative political views. Consequently, after his father's insanity and death, he became the colony's leading Exclusive and was trenchant in his opposition to the granting of civil rights to Emancipists. He was a strong supporter for the end of transportation and the replacement of convicts with cheap Asian "coolie" labour. Macarthur also proposed government subsidies for 'respectable' British immigrants and disparaged the principles of squatting while supporting the continued granting of freehold on crown land to the wealthy and respectable elite of the colony. He also warned that self-government may lead to the enfranchisement of Aboriginal Australians, a prospect which he and most other white Australians of the time found offensive. However, his views were known to change according to the political milieu and his economic interests. After initially opposing the granting of representative self-government to the colony he gave it his approval when it appeared to be inevitable and any further resistance had the potential to diminish his influence in a popularly elected parliament. He also took full economic advantage of pastoral squatting despite being a firm advocate of government grants.

The constitution granted to the colony in 1856 was seen by Macarthur as a dangerous experiment in liberalism and, after unsuccessfully attempting to influence the new parliament, he became disillusioned and retired to England in 1859. Under the influence of his daughter, he returned to the colony in the year before his death. Despite being one of the leading men of the colony between 1820 and 1856, Macarthur considered his political career to be a failure because most of his conservative policies were overturned as a liberal form of democracy developed in Australia. His historical legacy is largely under-valued because of his preference to use his influence away from public view.

== Death and legacy ==
Macarthur died on the Camden Park Estate on 21 April 1867.

He had a private library of about 3,000 volumes at the time of his death.

New South Wales Legislative Council
Unknown	Appointed member 24 October 1839 − 5 January 1843	Unknown
Preceded by John Benton Wild	Member for County of Camden; 1 July 1848 – 30 June 1851	Succeeded by Seat abolished
New district	Member for County of Camden (Western Division); 1 September 1851 – 29 February 1856	Original Council abolished
Unknown	Appointed member 24 July 1866 − 21 April 1867	Unknown
New South Wales Legislative Assembly
Preceded by First election	Member for Western Division of Camden; 16 June 1856 – 19 December 1859; With: John Oxley / William Wild	Succeeded by Seat abolished
