= Electoral district of Western Division of Camden =

Former state electoral district of New South Wales, Australia

Western Division of Camden was an electoral district for the Legislative Assembly in the Australian state of New South Wales from 1856 to 1857. Its name was changed to West Camden between 1858 and 1859, when it was replaced by the electoral district of Camden. It elected two members simultaneously, with voters casting two votes and the first two candidates being elected. The electorate was based on western Camden County, which adjoins the Cumberland County (Sydney Basin) to the south, including the Southern Highlands and, to the east, the Illawarra.

Candidates were elected in 1856, and 1858. There was also a by-election in 1856 as a result of James Macarthur resignation due to concerns about the constitutionality of the 1856 elections, in which he was re-elected unopposed.

== Members for Western Division of Camden ==
Member	Party	Term	Member	Party	Term
James Macarthur	None	1856–1859	John Oxley	None	1856–1857
James Macarthur	None	1856–1859	William Wild	None	1858–1859

== Election results ==
1858 New South Wales colonial election: Western Division of Camden 21 January
Candidate	Votes	%
James Macarthur (re-elected 1)	366	40.1
William Wild (elected 2)	358	39.3
John Oxley (defeated)	188	20.6
Total formal votes	912	100.0
Informal votes	0	0.0
Turnout	912	53.5
