= Electoral district of Sydney Hamlets =

Former state electoral district of New South Wales, Australia

Sydney Hamlets New South Wales—Legislative Assembly
- State: New South Wales
- Created: 1856
- Abolished: 1859
- Coordinates: 33°55′S 151°10′E

Sydney Hamlets was an electoral district of the Legislative Assembly in the British colony of New South Wales created in 1856 and abolished in 1859. The district was established in 1856 with the new parliament, consisting of the elected Legislative Assembly and an appointed Legislative Council, which replaced the unicameral Legislative Council in which 36 of the 54 members were elected and the other 18 were appointed

== History ==
The district including what were then outer suburbs of Sydney and are now the inner suburbs of Paddington, Surry Hills, Redfern, Chippendale, Glebe, Camperdown, O'Connell Town (north Newtown), Balmain, North Sydney, Kirribilli and McMahons Point. The district had been represented by the Legislative Council district of Sydney Hamlets and the final member was Stuart Donaldson.

Sydney Hamlets was won and held by the first Premier of New South Wales, Stuart Donaldson, for the duration of his premiership. Sydney Hamlets elected two members simultaneously, with voters casting two votes and the first two candidates being elected.

In 1859 the district was abolished and replaced with the electorates of Paddington, Glebe, Newtown and St Leonards. From 1859 Daniel Cooper was the member for Paddington, while John Campbell was the member for Glebe.

== Members ==
Member 1	Period	Member 2	Period
Stuart Donaldson	1856 (Mar–Oct)	Daniel Cooper	1856–1859
John Campbell	1856–1859	Daniel Cooper	1856–1859

== Election results ==
1858 New South Wales colonial election: Sydney Hamlets 13 January
Candidate	Votes	%
John Campbell (re-elected 1)	891	35.1
Sir Daniel Cooper (re-elected 2)	876	34.5
Robert Tooth	773	30.4
Total formal votes	2,540	100.0
Informal votes	0	0.0
Turnout	2,540	34.4
