= Elias Weekes =

Politician from New South Wales, Australia

7th Colonial Treasurer of New South Wales
- In office 18 April 1859 – 26 October 1859
- Preceded by: Robert Campbell
- Succeeded by: Saul Samuel
- In office 9 March 1860 – 20 March 1863
- Preceded by: Saul Samuel
- Succeeded by: Thomas Smart

Personal details
- Born: 13 July 1809 London
- Died: 5 August 1881 (aged 72) Sydney

Elias Carpenter Weekes (13 July 1809 – 5 August 1881) was an Australian ironmonger and politician. He was a member of the New South Wales Legislative Council between 1865 and 1880. He was also a member of the New South Wales Legislative Assembly between 1856 and 1864. He served two terms as the Colonial Treasurer of New South Wales.

== Early life ==
Weekes was the son of a shipwright at Chatham Dockyard. He had a rudimentary education and work in commercial occupations in England. Weekes emigrated to Sydney in 1837 and had established successful ironmongery and wine importation businesses by 1855. He was a director of The Bank of New South Wales. Philosophically a liberal, he became politically active during the 1840s and 1850s and opposed the conservative constitution proposed by William Wentworth. He was a member of the committee of the Anti-Transportation League and an alderman of the Sydney Municipal Council between 1850 and 1853.

== Colonial Parliament ==
At the first election under the new constitution Weekes contested the seats of Cumberland (South Riding) and Northumberland Boroughs. He was elected for Cumberland (South Riding) but was defeated by Bourn Russell in Northumberland Boroughs. However, Russell's election was overturned on appeal and Weekes was declared elected and chose to represent the seat until it was abolished at the next election. He then represented West Maitland until 1864. In 1865, he accepted a life appointment to the Legislative Council.

== Government ==
Weekes was the Colonial Treasurer of New South Wales in the second government of Charles Cowper between April and October 1859. He held the same position in the first Robertson and third Cowper governments between 1860 and 1863 when worsening eyesight forced him to resign from the government. He was a strong advocate of legislation to restrict Chinese immigration and opposed state aid to religious schools.

New South Wales Legislative Assembly
New assembly	Member for Cumberland (South Riding); 1856 – 1856; With: William Manning	Succeeded by Ryan Brenan
Preceded by Bourn Russell	Member for Northumberland Boroughs; 1856 – 1859; With: Bob Nicholls / James Dickson	District abolished
New district	Member for West Maitland; 1859 – 1864	Succeeded by Benjamin Lee
Political offices
Preceded by Robert Campbell	Colonial Treasurer; 1859	Succeeded by Saul Samuel
Preceded by Saul Samuel	Colonial Treasurer; 1860-63	Succeeded by Thomas Smart
