= Electoral district of Cumberland (South Riding) =

Former state electoral district of New South Wales, Australia

Cumberland (South Riding) was an electoral district of the Legislative Assembly in the Australian state of New South Wales from 1856 to 1859, in the rural part of Cumberland County, which includes Sydney. It included all of the county south of Parramatta Road and the Great Western Highway, except for the urban electorates of Sydney (City), Sydney Hamlets, Parramatta and Cumberland Boroughs, which included Liverpool and Campbelltown. It elected two members simultaneously, with voters casting two votes and the first two candidates being elected.

== Members for Cumberland (South Riding) ==
Member	Party	Period	Member	Party	Period
William Manning	None	1856–1857	Elias Weekes	None	1856–1856
William Manning	None	1856–1857	Ryan Brenan	None	1856–1856
William Manning	None	1856–1857	Stuart Donaldson	None	1856–1859
James Byrnes	None	1857–1858	Stuart Donaldson	None	1856–1859
Edward Flood	None	1858–1859	Stuart Donaldson	None	1856–1859

== Election results ==
1858 New South Wales colonial election: Cumberland (South Riding) 30 January
Candidate	Votes	%
Edward Flood (re-elected 1)	1,271	42.3
Stuart Donaldson (re-elected 2)	955	31.8
Thomas Holt (defeated)	778	25.9
George Smith	0	0.0
Total formal votes	3,004	100.0
Informal votes	0	0.0
Turnout	3,004	41.3

The other sitting member James Byrnes successfully contested Parramatta. Edward Flood was a sitting member for North Eastern Boroughs. Thomas Holt was the sitting member for Stanley Boroughs. There was some debate as to whether George Smith had received no votes, with Stuart Donaldson stating that he had seen one vote while Edward Flood said he had seen several.
