= Electoral district of Northumberland Boroughs =

Former state electoral district of New South Wales, Australia

Northumberland Boroughs was an electoral district of the Legislative Assembly in the Australian state of New South Wales from 1856 to 1859, including the towns of Morpeth, East Maitland, and West Maitland, and named after Northumberland County. It elected two members simultaneously, with voters casting two votes and the first two candidates being elected.

== Members for Northumberland Boroughs ==
Member	Party	Period	Member	Party	Period
Bourn Russell	None	1856	Bob Nichols	None	1856–1857
Elias Weekes	None	1856–1859	Bob Nichols	None	1856–1857
Elias Weekes	None	1856–1859	James Dickson	None	1857–1859

== Election results ==
1858 New South Wales colonial election: Northumberland Boroughs Wednesday 27 January
Candidate	Votes	%
James Dickson (re-elected)	unopposed	
Elias Weekes (re-elected)	unopposed	
