= 1856 New South Wales colonial election =

Colonial election for New South Wales, Australia in 1856

← 1851	11 March 1856 – 19 April 1856	1858 →

All 54 seats in the New South Wales Legislative Assembly 28 Assembly seats were needed for a majority
- Registered: 44,451
- Turnout: 48.51%
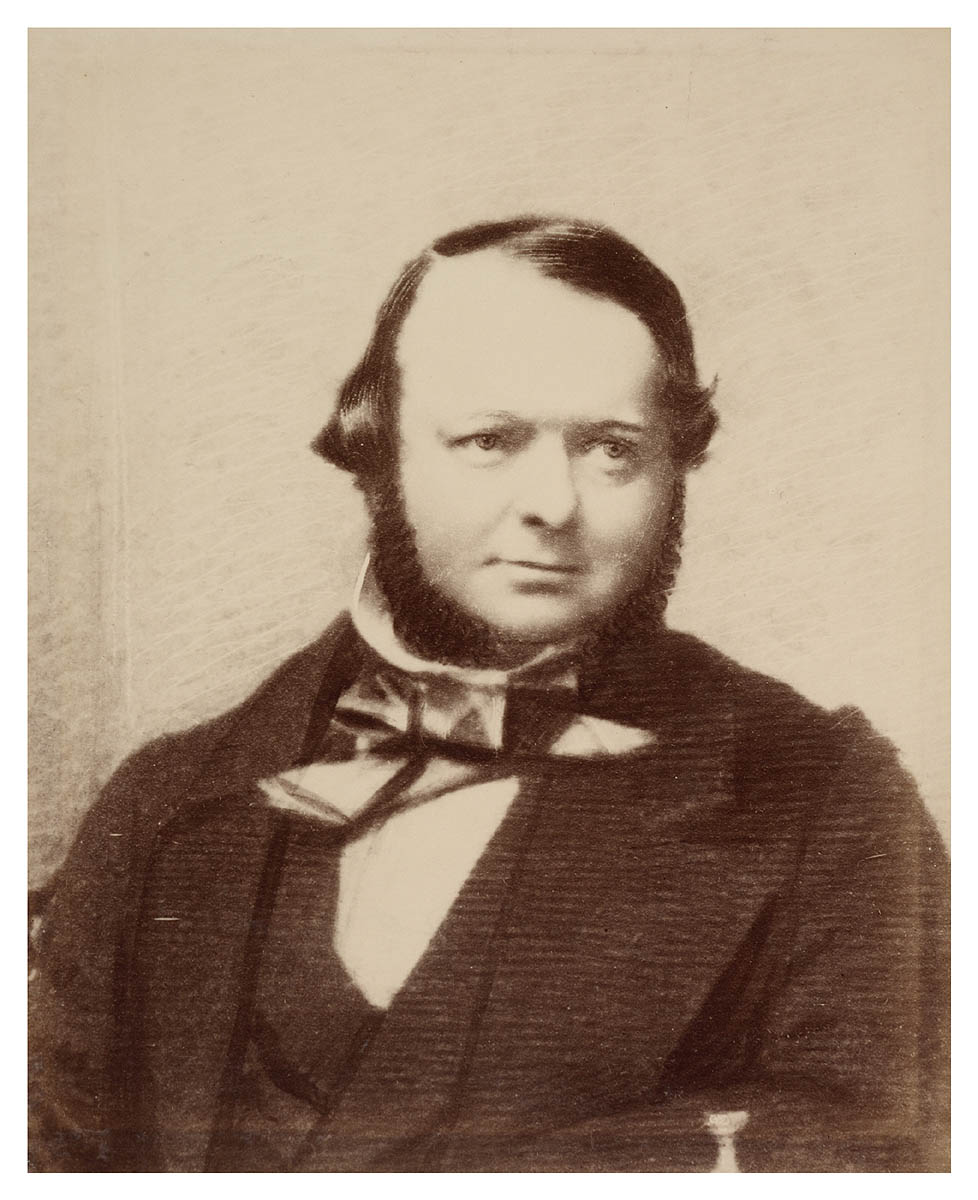
Leader	Stuart Donaldson
Leader's seat	Sydney Hamlets
- Results of the election, showing winners in each seat. Seats without circles indicate the electorate returned one member.
Elected Premier
Stuart Donaldson

The 1856 New South Wales colonial election was held between 11 March and 19 April 1856. This election was for all of the 54 seats in the New South Wales Legislative Assembly and it was conducted in 18 single-member constituencies, 13 2-member constituencies, two 3-member constituencies and one 4-member constituency, all with a first past the post system.

This was not a secret ballot and voters were required to write their name and address on the ballot paper.

Only men aged over 21 who owned at least a certain amount of land or had above a certain income, could vote. If a man fulfilled these requirements in multiple constituencies, then he was allowed to cast a vote in each. This was known as plural voting.

Indigenous men were allowed to vote in theory (there was no specific law against them voting), but in practice they were generally not aware of the process, not encouraged to enrol, and were mostly excluded and unable to participate in the election. In 1856, the Australian frontier wars were ongoing between various Aboriginal First Nations and the NSW government and colonists.

This was the first election held since the introduction of self-government in New South Wales. The resulting parliament, devoid of anything resembling party structure, ran for two weeks before Stuart Donaldson assumed the premiership, and struggled to deliver stable government during its term.

== Key dates ==
Date	Event
10 March to 5 April 1856	Nominations for candidates for the election closed.
11 March to 19 April 1856	Polling days.
22 May 1856	Opening of new Parliament.

== Results ==
New South Wales colonial election, 11 March 1856 – 19 April 1856 Legislative Assembly << 1851–1858 >>
Enrolled voters	44,451				
Votes cast	38,044 votes 20,109 voters		Turnout	48.51% of eligible voters	
Informal votes	0		Informal	0.00	
Summary of votes by party
Party	Primary votes	%	Swing	Seats	Change
Total	38,044			54	

== See also ==
- Members of the New South Wales Legislative Assembly, 1856–1858
- Candidates of the 1856 New South Wales colonial election
- Results of the 1856 New South Wales colonial election
