= Cynanchum elegans =

Scientific classification
- Kingdom: Plantae
- Clade: Tracheophytes
- Clade: Angiosperms
- Clade: Eudicots
- Clade: Asterids
- Order: Gentianales
- Family: Apocynaceae
- Genus: Cynanchum
- Species: C. elegans

Binomial name
- Cynanchum elegans (Benth.) Domin

Synonyms
- Vincetoxicum elegans Benth.

Species of plant

Cynanchum elegans, the white-flowered wax plant, is a plant species in the genus Cynanchum found in New South Wales in Australia. It is a threatened species.

It was first described by George Bentham in 1868 as Vincetoxicum elegans, from two specimens: one collected by Woolls and the other by "Miss Scott" (either Helena or Harriet). It was assigned to the genus, Cynanchum, in 1928 by Karel Domin.
