= Electoral district of Northumberland and Hunter =

Former state electoral district of New South Wales, Australia

Northumberland and Hunter was an electoral district for the Legislative Assembly in the Australian state of New South Wales from 1856 to 1859, in the Newcastle area and named after Northumberland County and the Hunter River. It elected three members, with voters casting three votes and the first three candidates being elected. For the 1859 election it was replaced by Northumberland and the remainder was divided between Hunter and Lower Hunter.

== Members for Northumberland and Hunter ==
Member	Party	Period	Member	Party	Period	Member	Party	Period
Alexander Scott	None	1856–1859	William Piddington	None	1856–1859	Hovenden Hely	None	1856–1857
Alexander Scott	None	1856–1859	William Piddington	None	1856–1859	George White	None	1858–1859

== Election results ==
=== 1856 ===
1856 New South Wales colonial election: Northumberland and Hunter
Candidate	Votes	%
Alexander Walker Scott (elected 1)	821	27.1
William Piddington (elected 2)	706	23.3
Hovenden Hely (elected 3)	574	19.0
Henry Douglass	389	12.8
George Bowman	289	9.5
Walter Rotton	250	8.3
Total formal votes	3,029	100.0
Informal votes	0	0.0
Turnout	1,180	50.7

Polling was conducted on 17 April 1856. Both Bowman and Douglass had represented Counties of Northumberland and Hunter in the old Legislative Council. John Plunkett was nominated to stand in this seat but after being elected to both Argyle and Bathurst (County) on 31 March, he withdrew his nomination.

=== 1858 ===
1858 New South Wales colonial election: Northumberland and Hunter 30 January
Candidate	Votes	%
Alexander Scott (re-elected 1)	1,040	30.5
George White (elected 2)	969	28.4
William Piddington (re-elected 3)	945	27.7
Clark Irving (defeated)	457	13.40
Total formal votes	3,411	100.0
Informal votes	0	0.0
Turnout	3,411	38.0

The other sitting member Hovenden Hely did not contest the election. Clark Irving was the member for Clarence and Darling Downs.
