= Mount Dangar =

Australian mountain

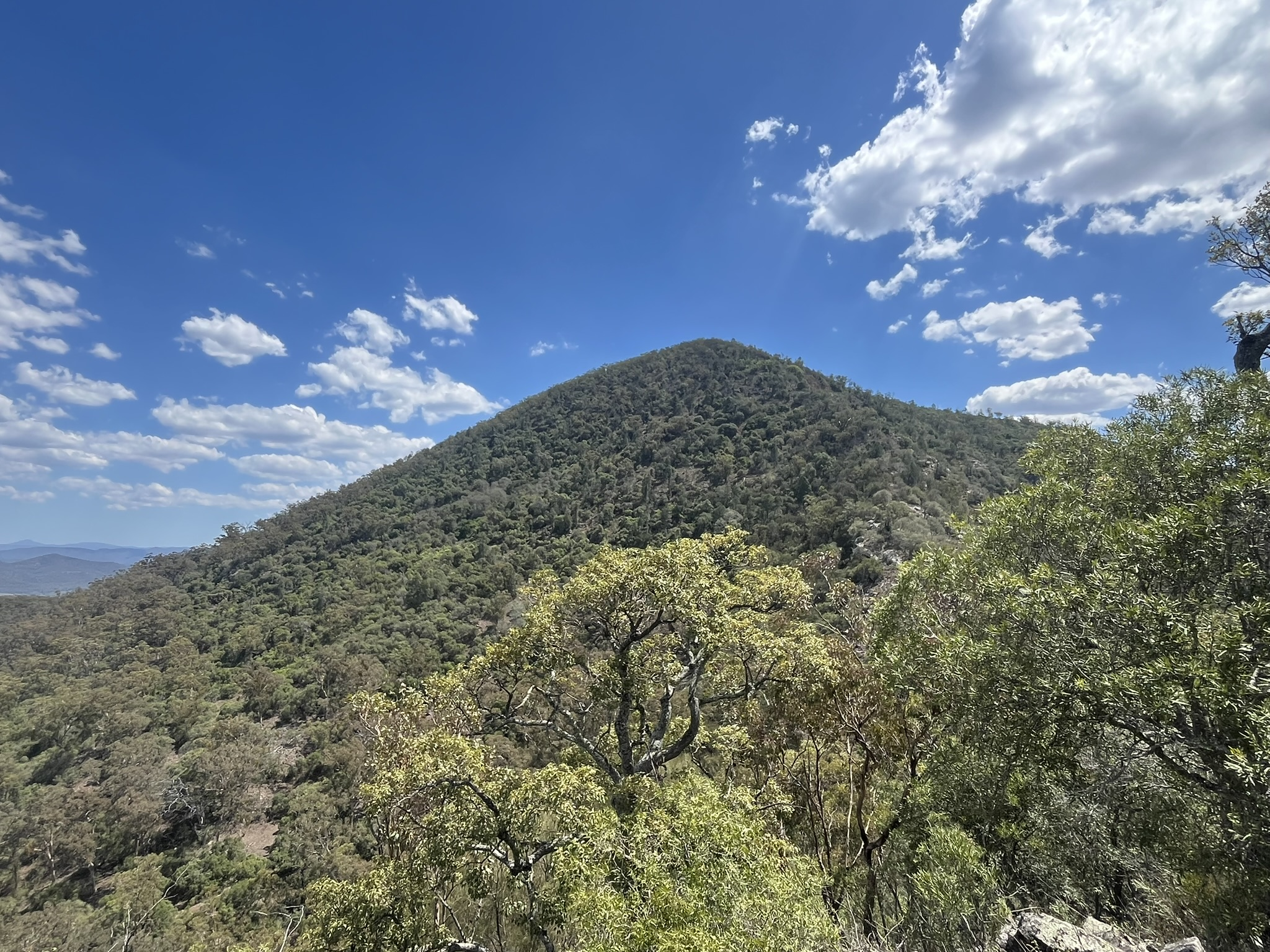
- Mt Dangar as Viewed from Adjacent Basalt Hill (Facing SW)

Highest point
- Elevation: 674 m (2,211 ft)
- Coordinates: 32°20′12″S 150°29′13″E

Geography
- Location within New South Wales
- Country: Australia
- State: New South Wales
- Region: Hunter Region
- Parent range: Great Dividing Range

Mount Dangar is prominent basalt peak at the eastern edge of the Goulburn River National Park, 35 km (22 mi) north-west of Denman, New South Wales.

It has an elevation of 674 m (2,211 ft) AHD, and the first man of European descent to report a sighting was the surveyor Henry Dangar in October 1824, following his exploration of the confluence of the Goulburn and Hunter Rivers. Dangar named the domed shaped mountain Mount Cupola.

In April 1825, botanist and explorer, Allan Cunningham, renamed the mountain Mount Dangar, when he ascended the mountain during his second northwest expedition to the Liverpool Plains.

Acacia dangarensis (Mount Dangar wattle) occurs within the Goulburn River National Park. It is regarded as critically endangered under the Commonwealth EPBC Act which, which in this case applies as a nationally threatened species and ecological community. The CSIRO concludes that A. dangarensis may best be managed by recognising centurial rather than decadal change in habitat.

Unique geological basalt column formations exist to the easterly adjacent hill of Mount Dangar. These columns cluster near the hill's summit in vertical and toppled horizontal arrangements.

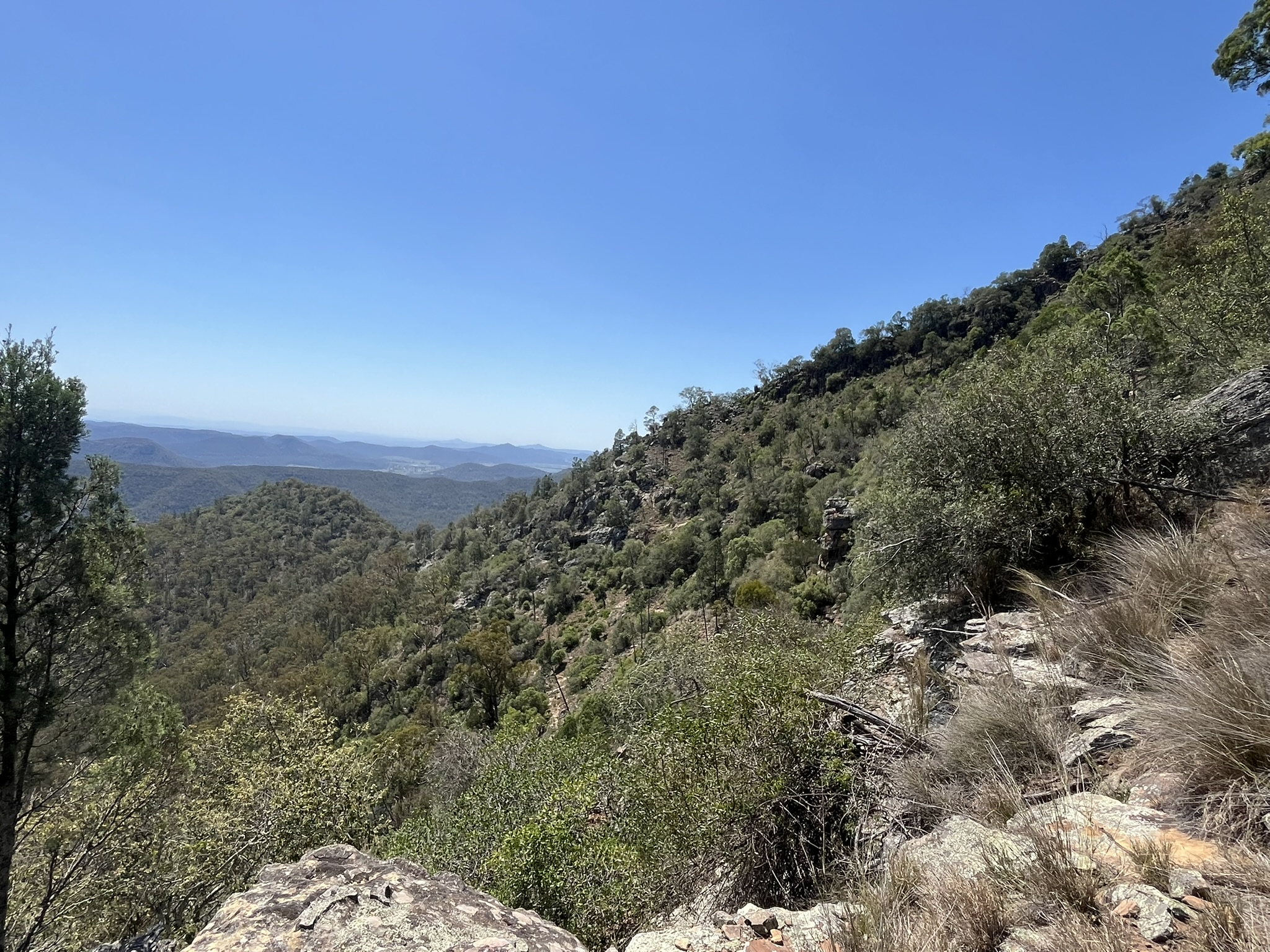
Exposed Northern Slope of Mount Dangar approx. 450m AHD.

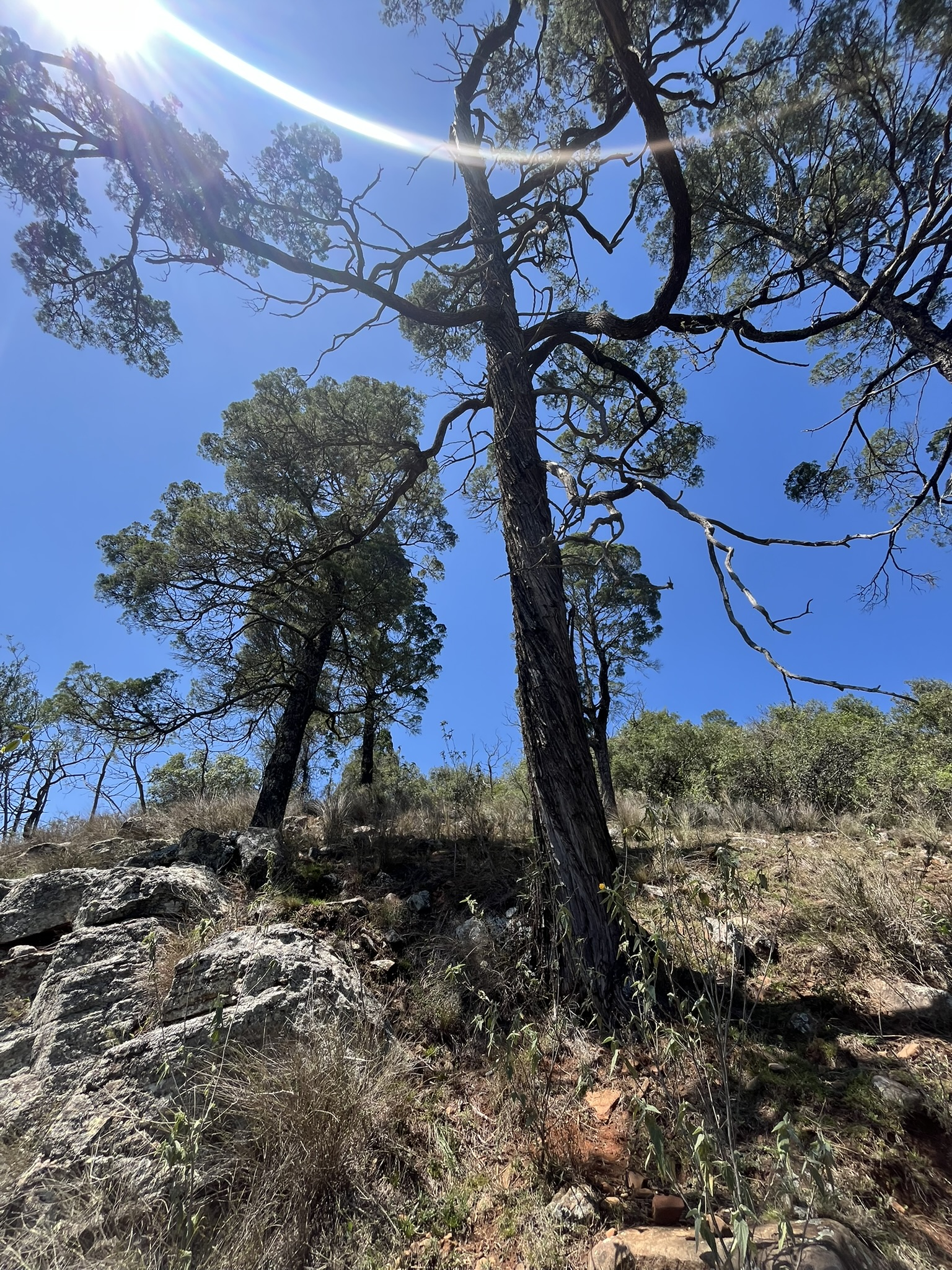
Black Cyprus Pine on an exposed semi-arid Pine Box Woodland slope approx. 450m AHD.

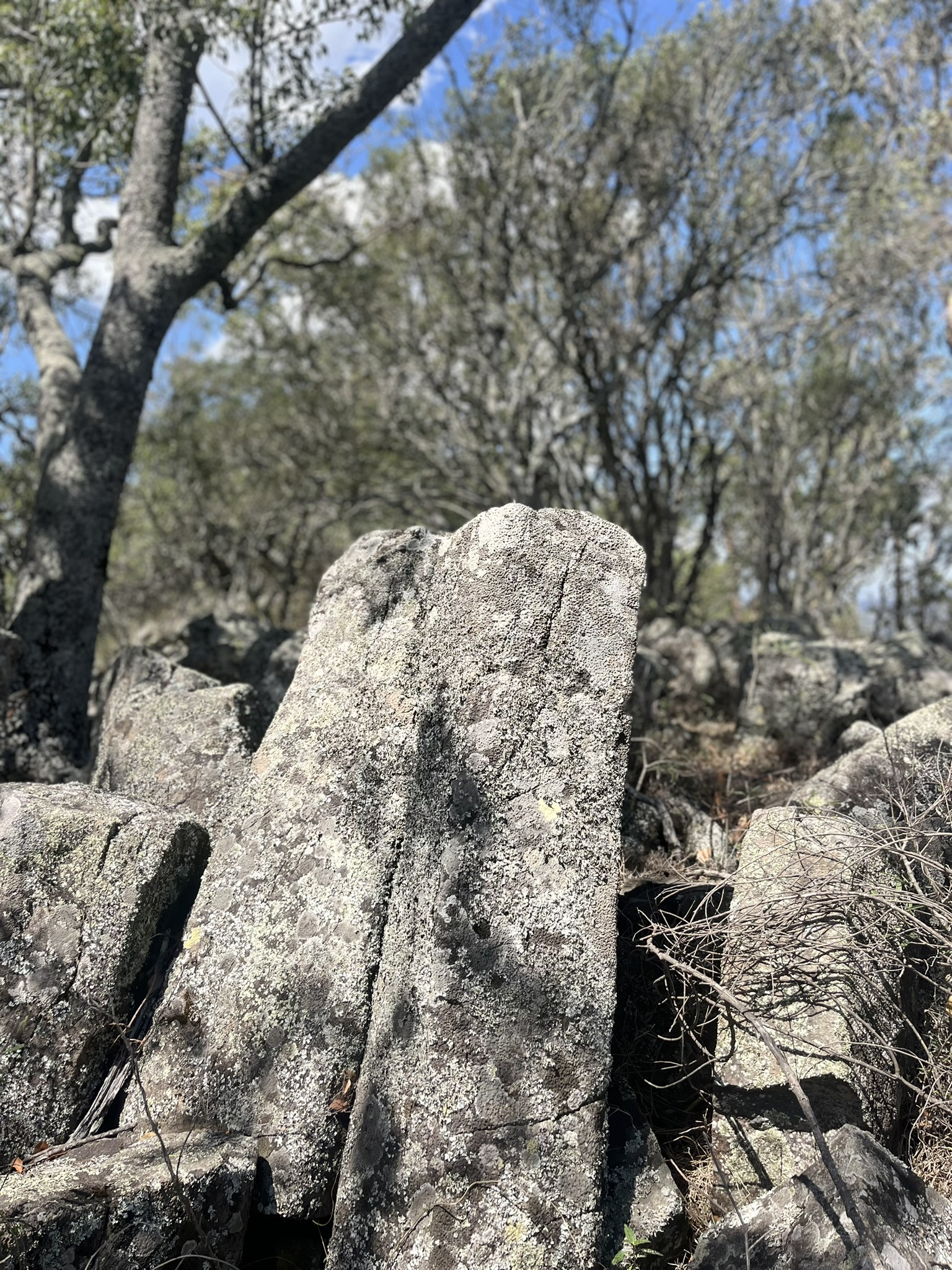
A series of vertical and toppled columns cluster the summit of a easterly adjacent hill to Mountt Dangar, AHD Approx. 450 m

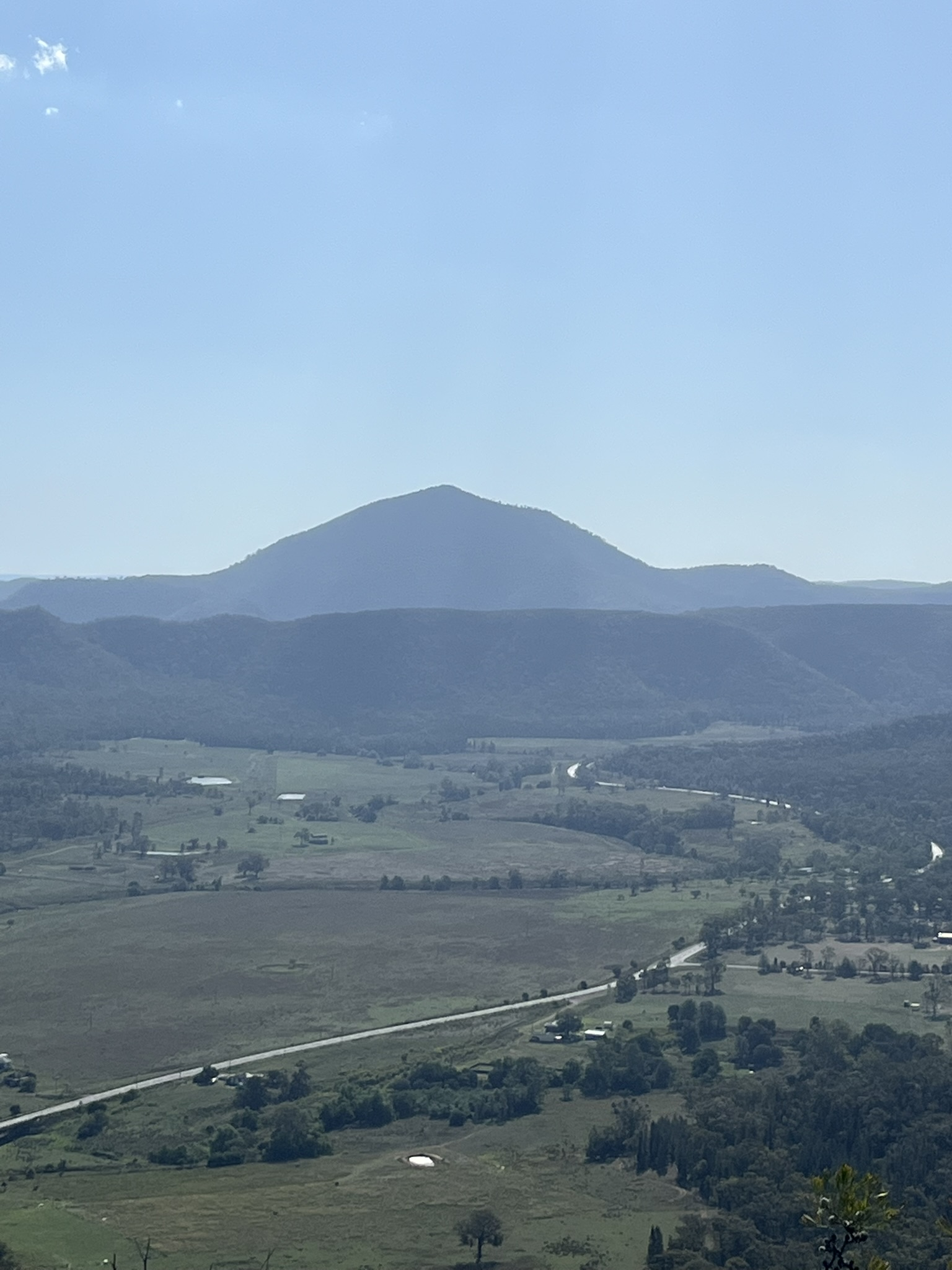
Facing westerly towards Mount Dangar from Giants Leap (Sandy Hollow)
