= George Boyle White =

Irish-born Australian politician

George Boyle White (24 August 1802 – 25 May 1876) was an Irish-born Australian politician.

He was born in Bantry to Royal Navy officer Boyle White and Honoria O'Sullivan. He is believed to have gone to sea at a young age, visiting Sydney in 1819 and China in the early 1820s before settling in Sydney in 1826, where he became a clerk for the Colonial Secretaries Office. From 1827 he was assistant surveyor and then from 1838 surveyor in the Surveyor-General's Department. On 17 June 1830 he married Maria Greig Mudie, with whom he had three children. He retired from surveying in 1853 and farmed at Singleton, Maitland and Raymond Terrace, but was not successful, being bankrupted in 1847. In 1858 he was elected to the New South Wales Legislative Assembly for Northumberland and Hunter, but he did not re-contest in 1859. He was bankrupted again in 1867. White died in Double Bay in 1876.

New South Wales Legislative Assembly
Preceded by Hovenden Hely	Member for Northumberland and Hunter; 1858–1859; Served alongside: William Piddington, Alexander Scott	Abolished
