= Harriet Morgan =

Australian artist (1830–1907)

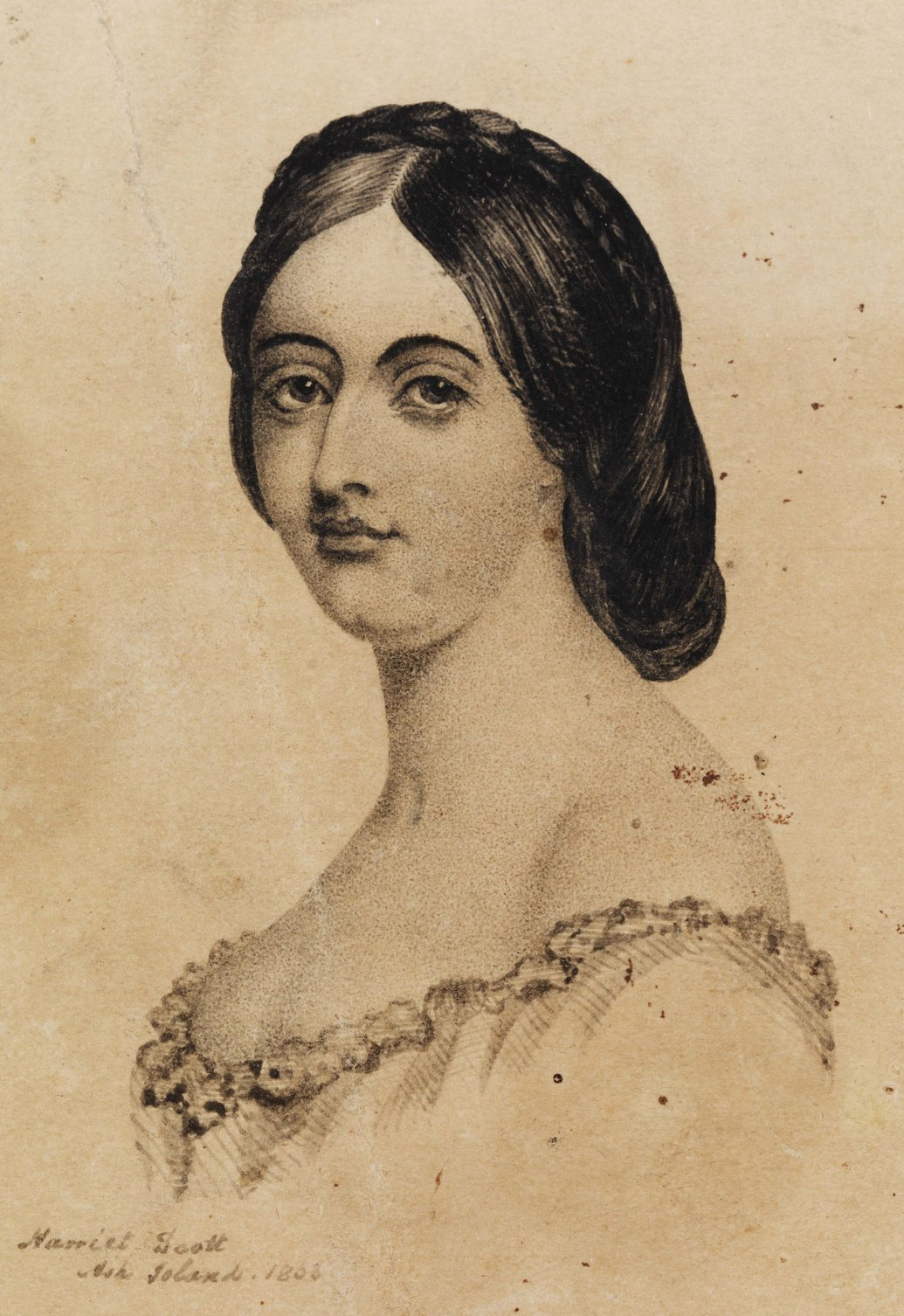
- Harriet Scott – Ash Island 1853
- Born: Harriet Scott; 1830; Sydney, Australia
- Died: 16 August 1907 (aged 76–77); Granville, Sydney, Australia
- Known for: natural history illustration
- Spouse: Dr Cosby William Morgan
- Parents: Alexander Walker Scott; Harriet Calcott
- Relatives: Helena Scott (sister)

Harriet Morgan (1830 – 16 August 1907) née Scott was one of 19th century Australia's most prominent natural history illustrators and, along with her sister Helena Scott, was possibly one of the first professional female illustrators in Australia. The sisters were also highly skilled amateur naturalists and collectors, rare accomplishments for women of their time. They were most notable for their magnificent drawings of moths and butterflies for the publication of the first volume of their father Alexander Walker Scott's work Australian Lepidoptera and Their Transformations.

== Early life ==
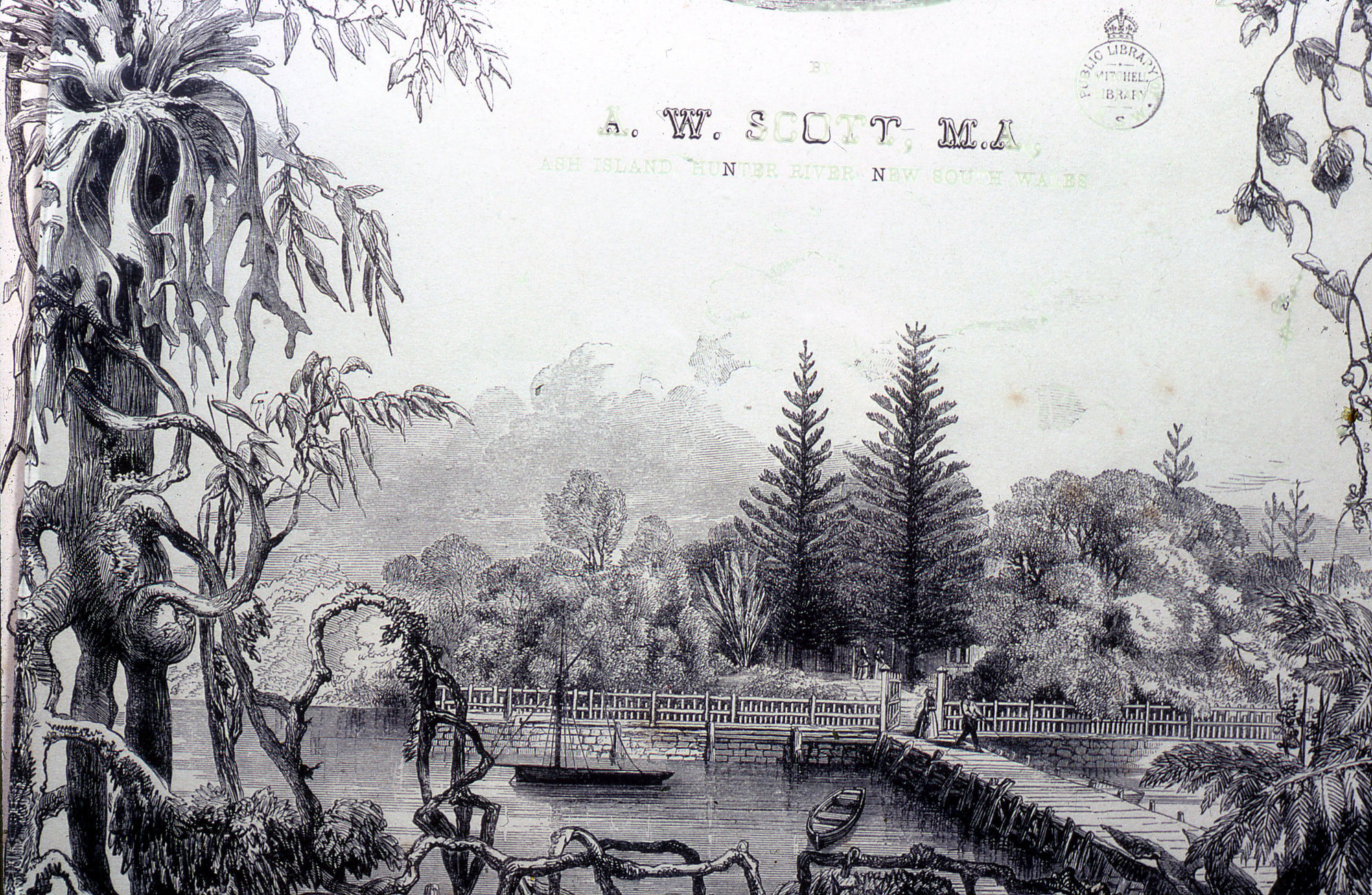
Ash Island (artist A.W. Scott)

Harriet Scott was the daughter of Alexander Walker Scott, entomologist and entrepreneur and seamstress Harriet Scott (née Calcott). Harriet was born in Sydney in New South Wales (NSW) and she and her sister Helena were educated by their father on Ash Island. Through their education they acquired extensive knowledge of the natural world, including Australian plants, animals and insects.

== Professional illustrator ==
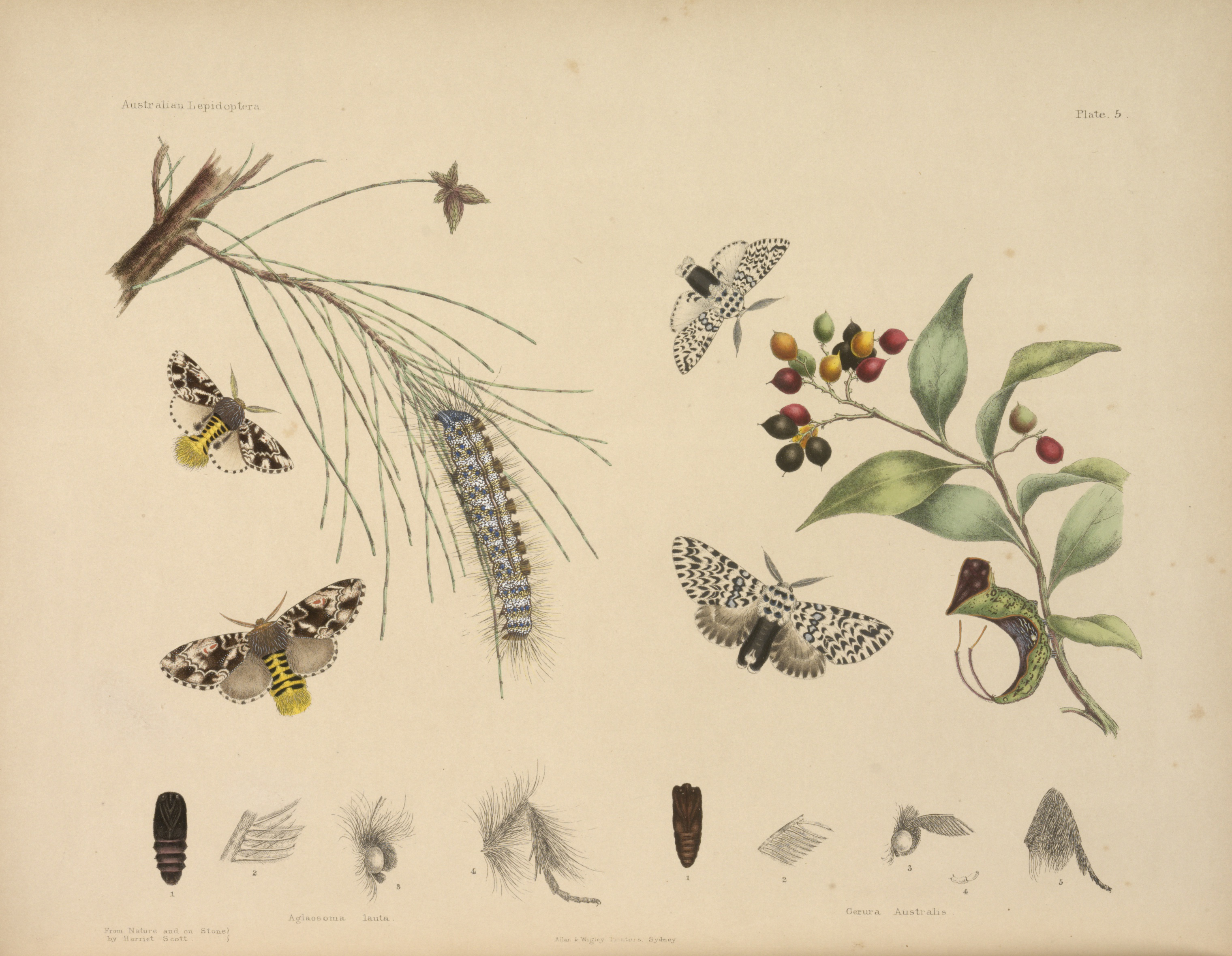
Aglaosoma lauta and Cerura australis

Harriet earned admiration and praise from leading colonial scientists who she collected for and corresponded with. After the publication of Australian Lepidoptera and their transformations, drawn from the life by Harriet and Helena Scott she was elected an honorary member of the Entomological Society of NSW. However, she was constrained by her class and position in society. Her father suffered financial hardship in the 1860s but no matter how poverty stricken he became, he did not want either of his daughters to accept commissions, sign their own published drawings or be formally educated, however Alexander Scott did finally relent and permitted his daughters signing their published drawings. Harriet was forced to work when he became bankrupt and she drew and painted commercially for the rest of her life. While finishing some plates of birds' eggs for Edward Ramsay in 1866, Harriet asked "above all ... let nobody know you are paying me for doing them for you". Harriet drew botanical illustrations for the 1879, 1884 and 1886 editions of the Railway Guide to New South Wales, and with her sister produced designs for Australia's first Christmas cards in 1879.

Scott married Dr Cosby William Morgan in 1882.

== Publications ==
Harriet was one of the illustrators for the publication of Australian Lepidoptera and Their Transformations written by her father Alexander Walker Scott. The success of the Lepidoptera presented many opportunities for her and her sister. Apart from gaining honorary membership of the Entomological Society of NSW Harriet received copious requests for commissions. The following decades saw her and Helena produce most of the art for science publications in Sydney including Gerard Krefft's Snakes of Australia (1869), Australian Fossil Remains (1870) and Mammals of Australia (1871), Edward Ramsay's On the Oology of Australia (proposed but never published) and JC Cox's Monograph of Australian Land Shells (1868). Her work is still used by scientists today. The artwork from Snakes of Australia and Mammals of Australia received a Very High Commendation at the Sydney Intercolonial Exhibition in 1870.

== Death and legacy ==
Harriet died in Granville in 1907 leaving no descendants.

Harriet is commemorated in the scientific name of a species of Australian venomous snake, Cacophis harriettae.

Harriet, with her sister Helena, were largely forgotten until the 2011 exhibition Beauty from Nature: Art of the Scott Sisters at the Australian Museum in Sydney.

== Gallery ==
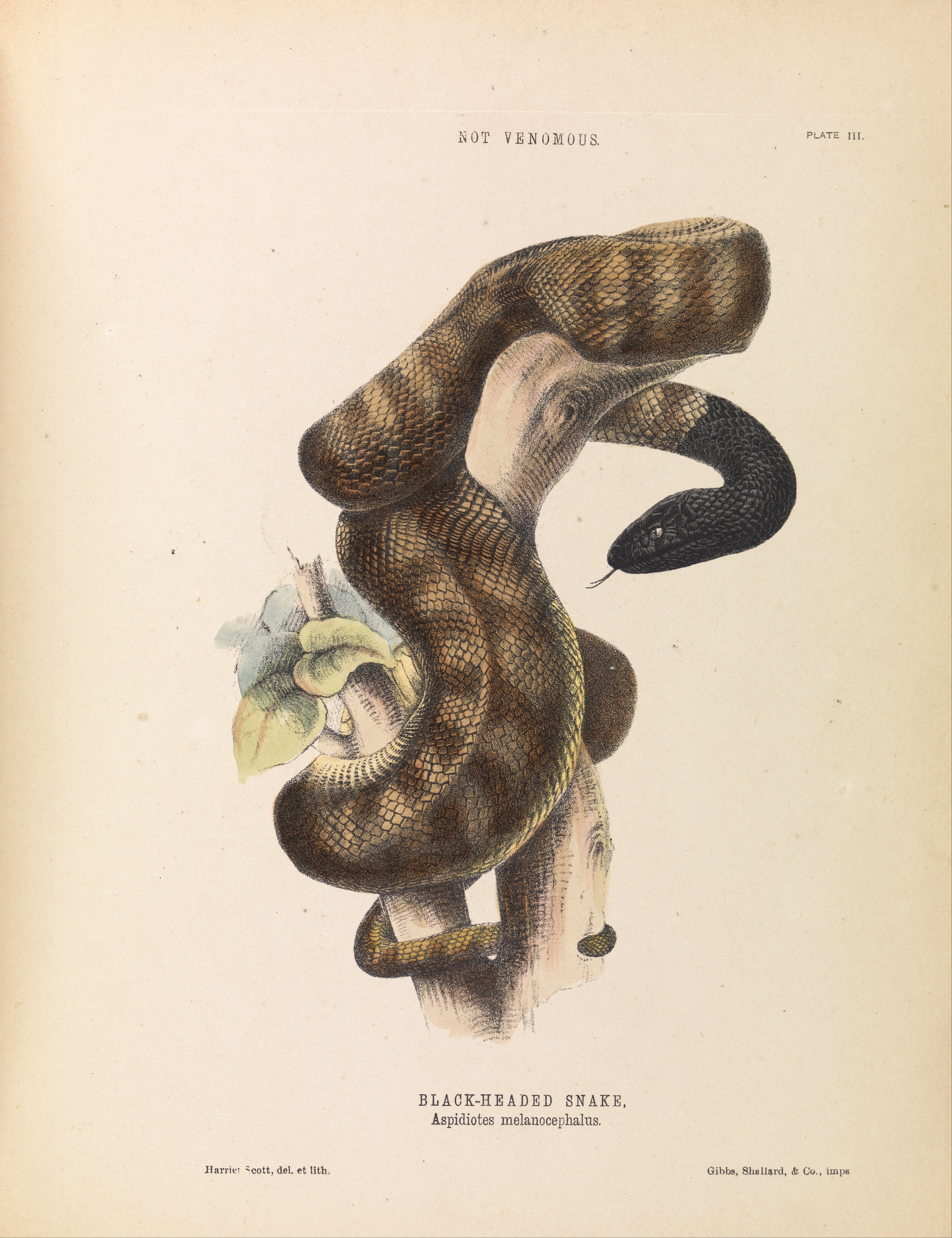

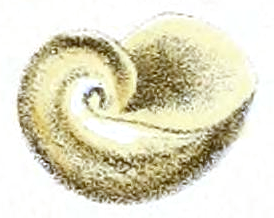

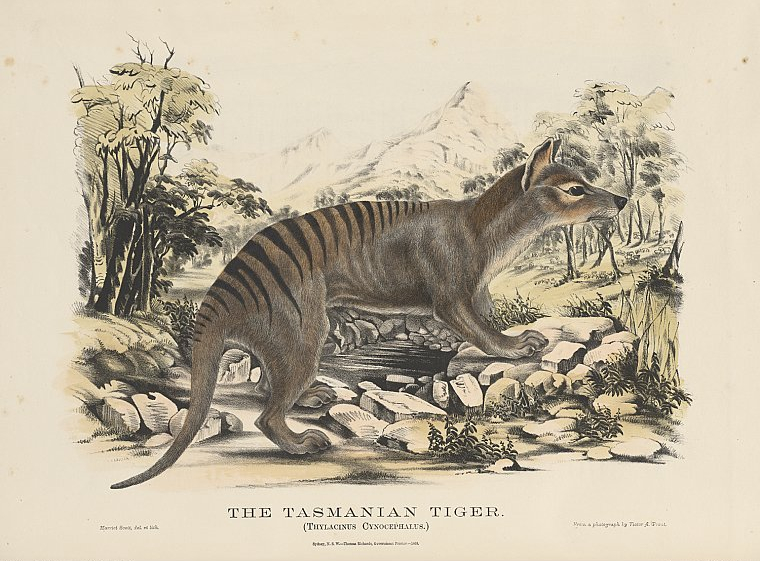

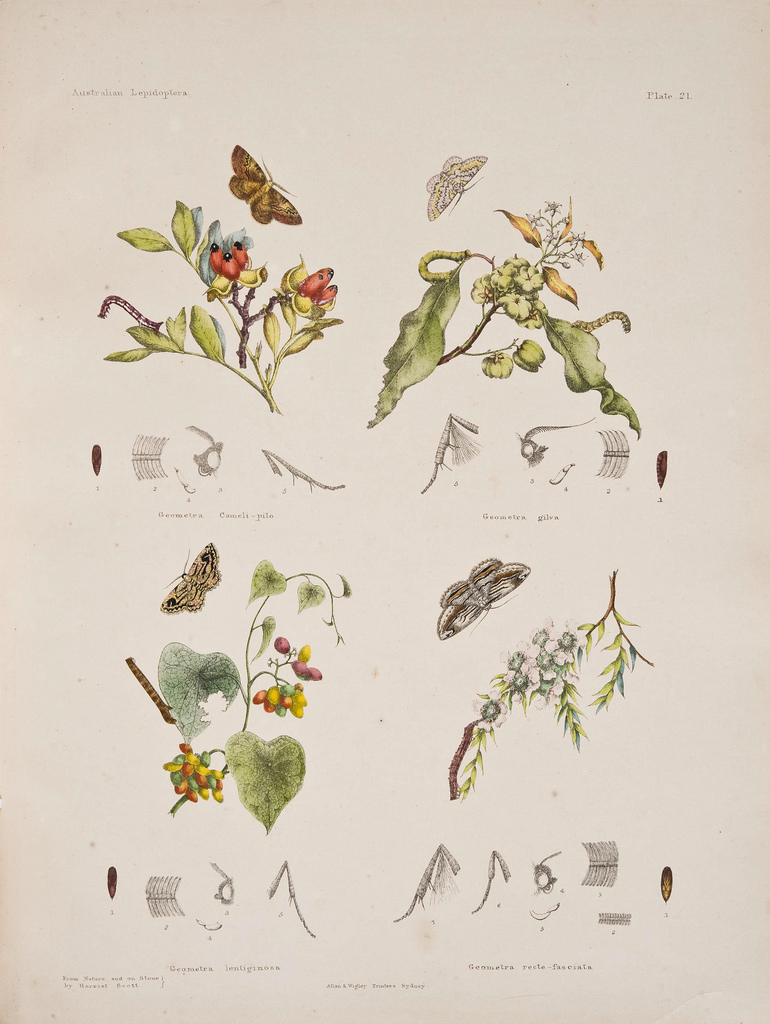
A plate from Australian Lepidoptera and their transformations, drawn from the life

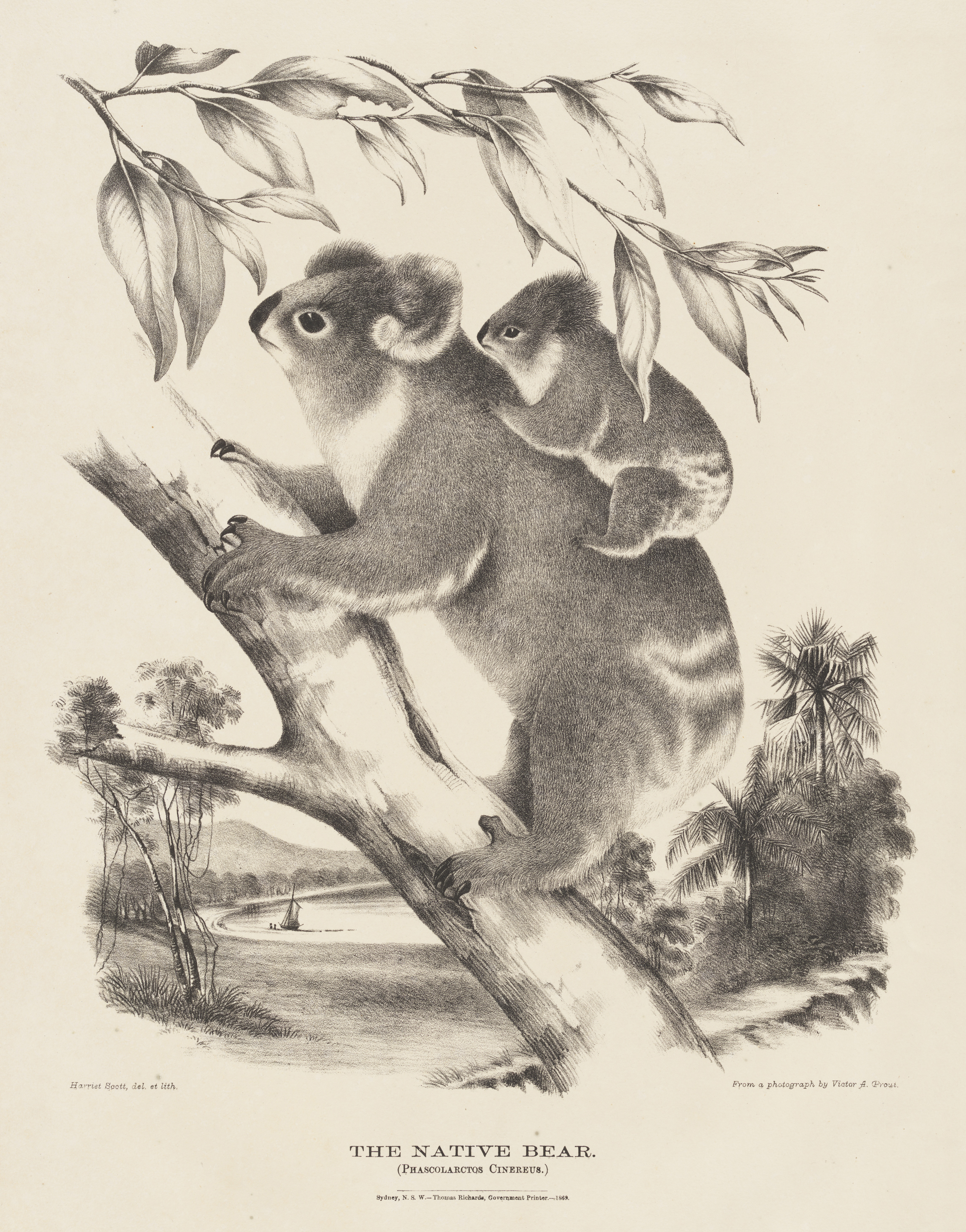
The Koala, or Native Bear (Phascolarctos cinereus). [Plate VI] published in The mammals of Australia (1871): illustrated by Miss Harriett Scott, and Mrs. Helena Forde
