= William Foster (New South Wales politician, born 1794) =

Australian politician (1794–1866)

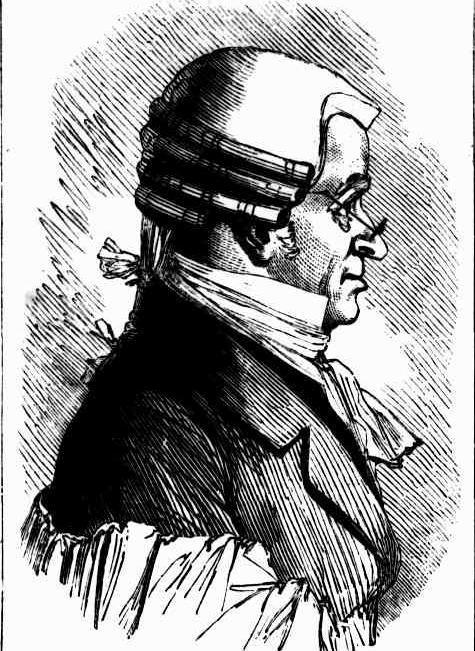
- Born: 28 February 1794; Settle, Yorkshire, England
- Died: 2 February 1866 (aged 71); Brighton, Sussex, England
- Occupations: Lawyer; Judge; Solicitor General for New South Wales
- Office: Member of the New South Wales Legislative Council
- Term: in office 1843–1845
- Spouses: Mary Anne Green; Angelina Job
- Children: 5
- Parents: John Foster (father); Jane Foster née Dowbiggin (mother)

William Foster (1794–1866) was an Australian lawyer and politician who was Solicitor General for New South Wales and member of the New South Wales Legislative Assembly.

== Early years ==
Foster was the son of John Foster (1758–1816), a farmer and landowner of Armitstead Hall, Settle, Yorkshire, England, and his wife Jane, née Dowbiggin. He was the younger brother of John Foster (1792-1875). Both John and William studied as boarders at Heath School in Halifax; William then moved on to study at Cambridge University before qualifying as a barrister at Lincoln's Inn Fields in London.

William Foster would have probably pursued a career in England but his father's death, at the age of 57, occurred just after the end of the Napoleonic Wars and coincided with a severe decline in England's rural economy that depressed product and land values for over a decade. Debts had previously been incurred in efforts to expand and develop the family estate but interest payments, together with falling returns from produce and difficulty in collecting rent from tenants, placed major pressures on the family's finances. For William, pressures were increased by the needs of establishing himself in his career as a lawyer.

== New South Wales ==
In 1826 one of Foster's colleagues, Alexander Baxter, was offered the position of Attorney General of New South Wales. Foster decided to travel with him and migrated to Sydney with wife Mary Anne and their three children aboard Orpheus, arriving in September 1826. Forster arrived intending to continue his career as a barrister but within a month was appointed to the newly created post of Solicitor General. Baxter was a dashing figure but totally incompetent as a lawyer and relied heavily on Foster to perform his duties.

In 1829 Foster was appointed chairman of the Courts of Quarter Sessions.

In 1838 Foster, along with William à Beckett and Richard Windeyer, defended the 11 colonists charged with murder in relation to the Myall Creek massacre. From 1843 to 1845 he was a member of the New South Wales Legislative Council.

William's brother, John, had already migrated to Tasmania in 1822, together with their mother and youngest brother, Henry. John was also a politician and was elected to the Tasmanian Legislative Council as the member for Huon from 1868 to 1874.

== Private life ==
Foster married Mary Anne Green in 1817. They had four children - Eliza (b.1818), William Cecil (1822-1862), Emilius Tyas (1826-1841) and Frederick Alfred Chambre Foster, born June 1831 in Sydney. After Mary Anne died in 1856, he married Angelina Job, with whom he had a son, born in England in 1859.

== Return to England ==
Foster returned to England in 1854 and settled in Brighton but his first wife, Mary Anne died only two years later and he remarried in 1858. After what appears to have been a happy retirement, Foster died at his home in Brighton on 2 February 1866, aged 72.

New South Wales Legislative Council
| New creation | Member for Northumberland; June 1843 – October 1845 | Succeeded by Henry Dangar |
