= Electoral district of County of Northumberland =

Former legislative council electoral district of New South Wales, Australia

County of Northumberland New South Wales—Legislative Council
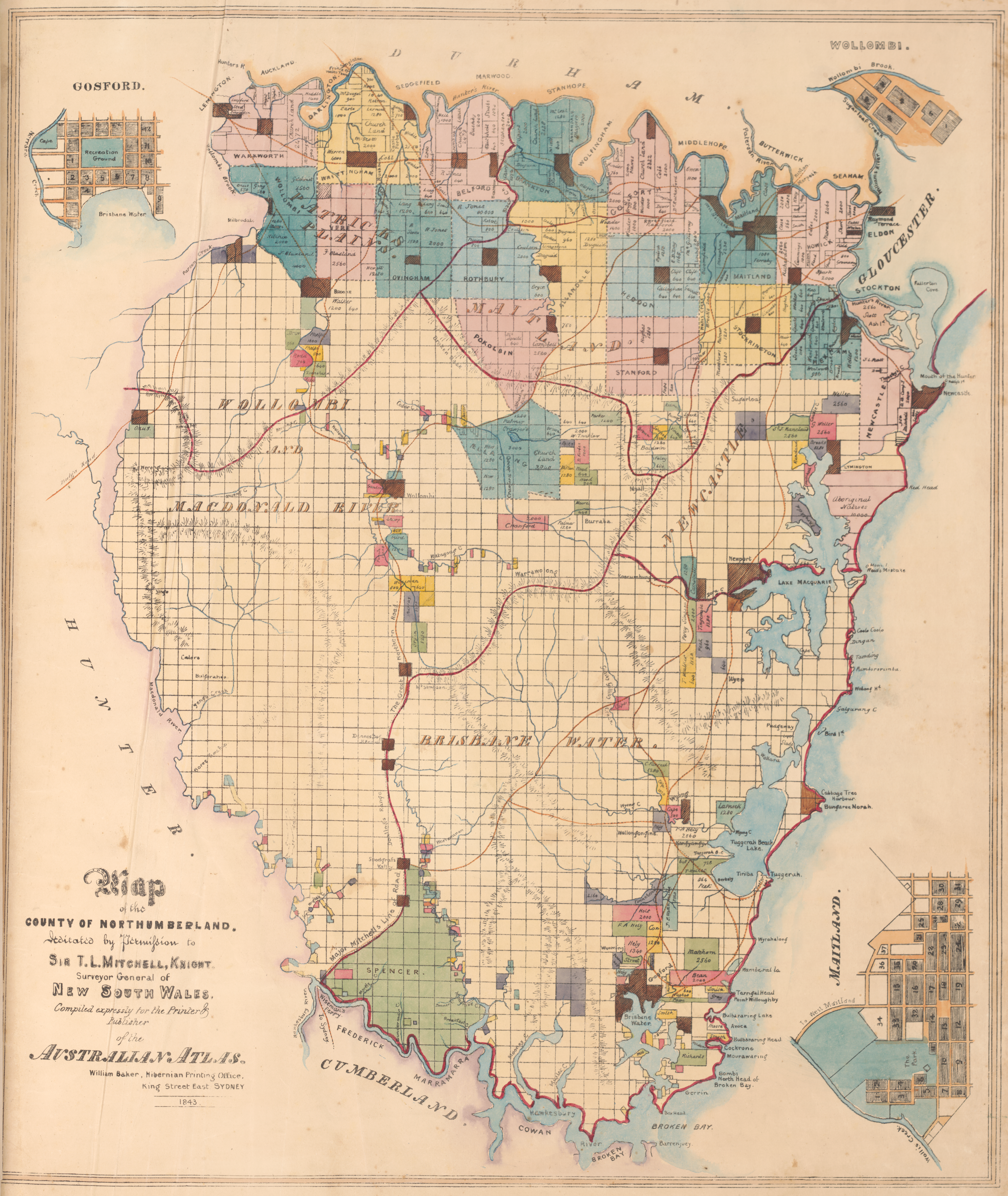
- State: New South Wales
- Created: 1843
- Abolished: 1851
- Namesake: Northumberland County, Hunter County

The Electoral district of County of Northumberland and from 1851, Northumberland and Hunter, was an electorate of the partially elected New South Wales Legislative Council, created for the first elections for the Council in 1843. The County of Northumberland was bounded by the part of the Hawkesbury River to the south, the Macdonald River to the south-west, and the Hunter River to the north, however the electoral district did not include the towns of East Maitland, West Maitland and Newcastle which made up the district of Northumberland Boroughs. Polling took place at Gosford, Newcastle, East Maitland, Wollombi, Singleton and Watson's on the Macdonald River. The County of Hunter was added to the district with the expansion of the Council in 1851 and elected two members.

In 1856 the unicameral Legislative Council was abolished and replaced with an elected Legislative Assembly and an appointed Legislative Council. The district was represented by the Legislative Assembly electorate of Northumberland and Hunter.

== Members ==
Northumberland (1843–1851)
Member 1	Term		
William Foster	Jun 1843 – Oct 1845		
Henry Dangar	Oct 1845 – Jun 1851		
Northumberland and Hunter (1851–1856)
Member 1	Term	Member 2	Term
Henry Douglass	Jul 1851 – Feb 1856	George Bowman	Jul 1851 – Feb 1856

== Election results ==
=== 1843 ===
1843 New South Wales colonial election, 19 June: County of Northumberland
Candidate	Votes	%
William Foster	unopposed	

=== 1845 ===
1845 County of Northumberland by-election 27 October 1845
Candidate	Votes	%
Henry Dangar	95	67.38
Andrew Lang	46	32.62
Total votes	141	100.00
Voter turnout	39.50%	

=== 1848 ===
1848 New South Wales colonial election, 31 July: County of Northumberland
Candidate	Votes	%
Henry Dangar (elected)	127	64
Charles Salmon Vallack	73	36
Total votes	200	100

=== 1851 ===
1851 New South Wales colonial election, 23 September: Counties of Northumberland and Hunter
Candidate	Votes	%
Henry Douglass	258	37.23
George Bowman	235	33.91
Daniel Egan	200	28.86
Total votes	693	100.00

== See also ==
- Members of the New South Wales Legislative Council, 1843–1851 and 1851-1856
