= Poa fordeana =

Scientific classification
- Kingdom: Plantae
- Clade: Tracheophytes
- Clade: Angiosperms
- Clade: Monocots
- Clade: Commelinids
- Order: Poales
- Family: Poaceae
- Subfamily: Pooideae
- Genus: Poa
- Species: P. fordeana

Binomial name
- Poa fordeana F.Muell.

Synonyms
- Glyceria fordeana (F.Muell.) Benth.; Panicularia fordeana (F.Muell.) Kuntze; Poa caespitosa var. flexuosa Reader; Poa hackelii Reader

Species of plant

Poa fordeana is a grass (family Poaceae) native to Australia which is found in New South Wales, Victoria, South Australia and Queensland.

It was first described in 1873 by Ferdinand von Mueller from a specimen collected by Helena Scott (Mrs Forde) whom the specific epithet, fordeana, honours.
