= Alexander Walker Scott =

Australian entomologist

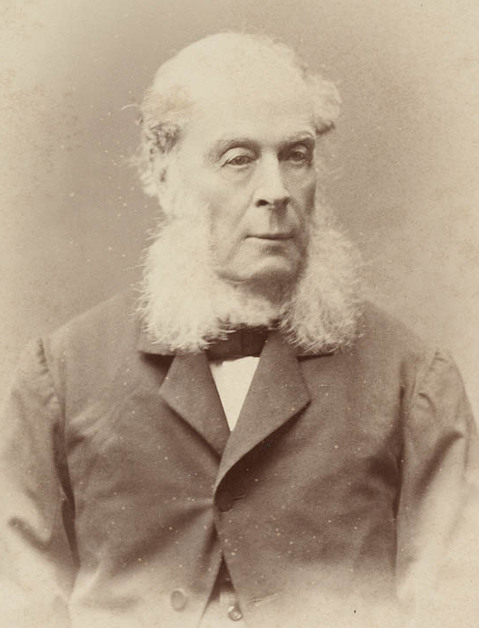
- Alexander Walker Scott, August 1882
- Born: 10 November 1800; Mumbai, India
- Died: 1 November 1883 (aged 82); Paddington, Sydney
- Known for: Australian Lepidoptera and their transformations
- Spouse: Harriet Calcott
- Scientific career
- Fields: Natural history, entomology
- Notable students: Harriet Morgan Helena Scott

Alexander Walker Scott (10 November 1800 – 1 November 1883) was an Australian entomologist mainly interested in butterflies.

Scott was the son of Dr Helenus and Augusta Maria Scott. He was born in Bombay, India and was educated at Bath Grammar School and Peterhouse, Cambridge, receiving a BA in 1822 and an MA in 1825. Scott was elected to the new Legislative Assembly, representing Northumberland and Hunter from 1856 to 1859, Northumberland 1858 to 1859 and Lower Hunter from 1860 to 1861. He supported the secret ballot and franchise extension. In 1861 he was nominated to the Legislative Council for life, but he took no part in it and resigned in 1866.

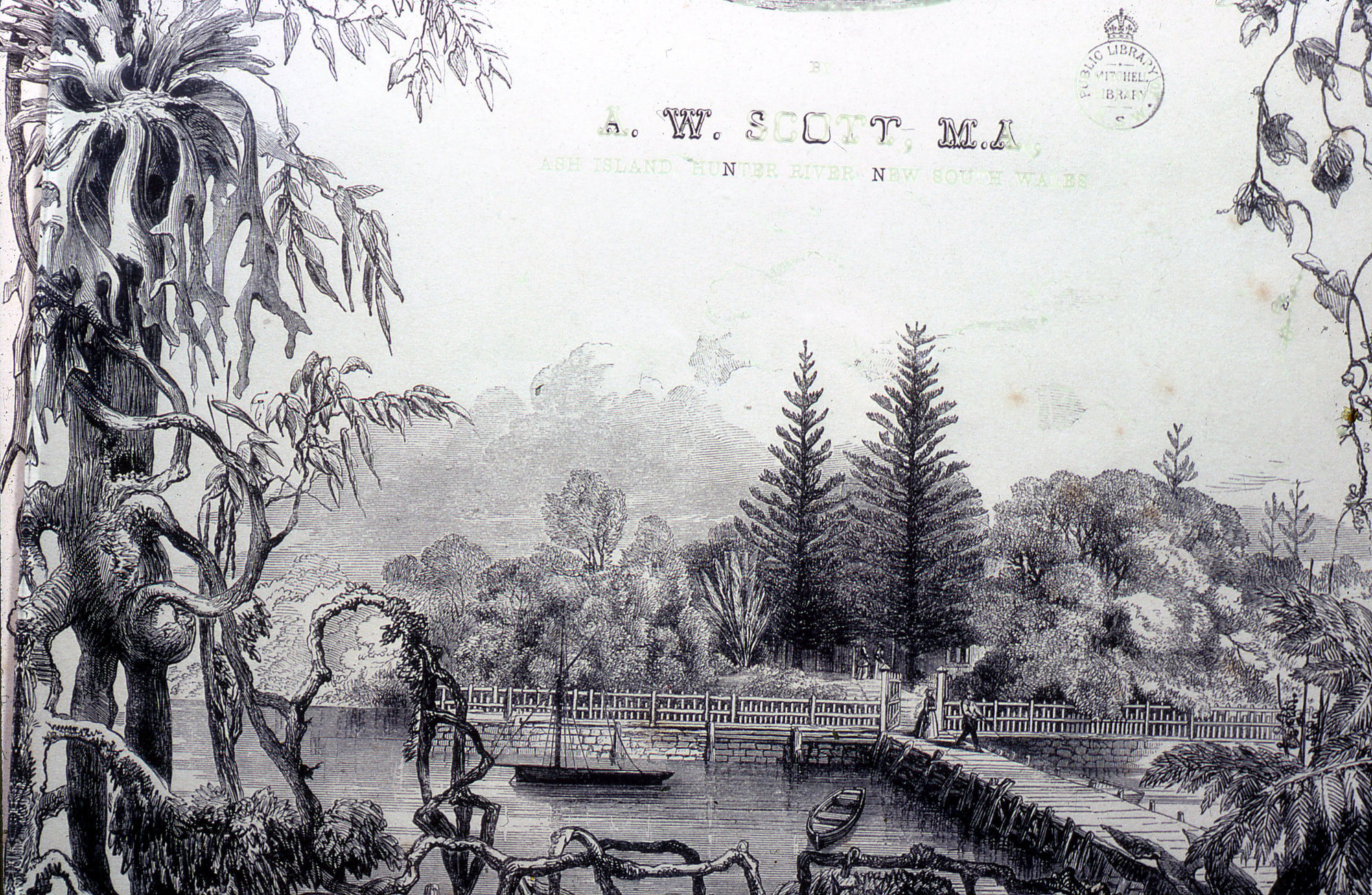
Ash Island (artist A.W.Scott)

A failed entrepreneur, he later became a prominent figure in the commercial establishment of the Newcastle region. He lived at Ash Island on the Hunter River with his wife, formerly Harriet Calcott, a seamstress, and his two daughters Harriet (1830–1907) and Helena Scott (1832–1910), both born in Sydney. At Ash Island the sisters helped their father in his entomological work, collecting, preparing and drying specimens of plants and insects, and also accepted painting, drawing and lithography commissions from Australian naturalists including Gerard Krefft, William Macleay, Thomas Sutcliffe Mort, Edward Pierson Ramsay, William Woolls and Ferdinand von Mueller.

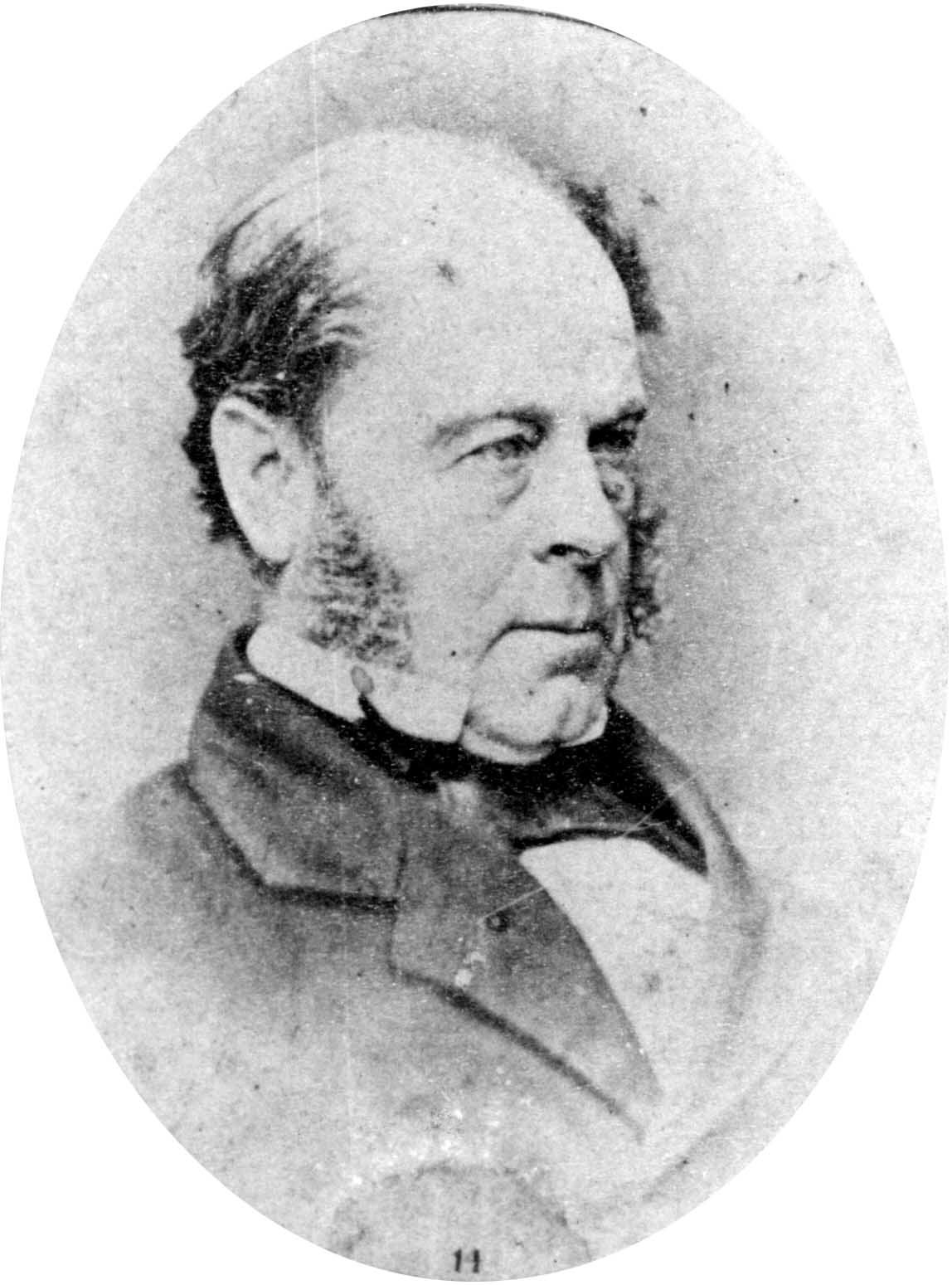
Alexander Walker Scott

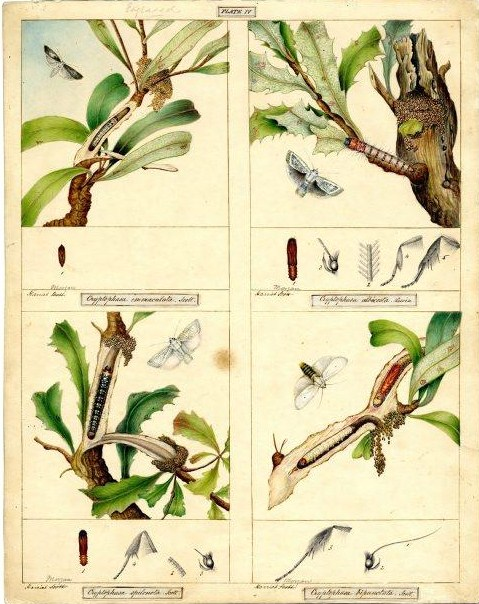
Australian Lepidoptera and their transformations, drawn from the life by Harriet and Helena Scott Plate 4 Watercolour original

The Scott sisters became established with the publication of Australian Lepidoptera and their transformations, drawn from the life by Harriet and Helena Scott which illustrated insects in the stages of metamorphosis, in the environment in which they lived and fed. This work, published in 1864, was time-consuming and expensive and publication was delayed for 12 years. Although published (in London : John van Voorst) under Alexander Walker Scott it was an entirely collaborative work as its title states.

Alexander Walker Scott was a trustee of the Australian Museum 1862–79 and a Fellow of The Entomological Society of New South Wales, founded in 1862, as were both Helena and Harriet, though in their case it was honorary, a rare distinction. He died in Paddington.

The Scott collection is conserved in the Australian Museum in Sydney.

In 1842 Scott invited Prussian explorer and artist Fredrich Wilhelm Ludwig Leichardt to stay at his house and arrived on 23 September and spent 3–4 days there.

== Works ==
- Description of an ovo-viviparous moth, belonging to the genus Tinea. Trans. Ent. Soc. London 1: 33–36 (1863).
- Australian Lepidoptera and their transformations, drawn from the life by Harriet and Helena Scott. 1. London : John van Voorst [ii]+36 pp., pls 1–9.(1864).
- On the "Agrotis vastator", a species of moth, now infesting the seaboard of New South Wales. Trans. Ent. Soc. London 2: 40–48 (1869).
- Australian Lepidoptera and their transformations, with illustrations drawn from the life by his daughters, Harriet Morgan and Helena Forde. Edited and revised by Arthur Sidney Olliff and Helena Forde. Sydney : Australian Museum 2 volumes.

== Notes ==
New South Wales Legislative Assembly
New assembly	Member for Northumberland and Hunter; 1856–1859; With: William Piddington; Hovenden Hely/George White	District abolished
New district	Member for Northumberland; 1859–1860	Succeeded by Thomas Lewis
Preceded by William Windeyer	Member for Lower Hunter; 1860–1861	Succeeded by Richard Sadleir

== Additional references ==
- Anonym 2010: Encyclopedia of Australian science
- Musgrave, A. 1932: Bibliography of Australian Entomology 1775 – 1930. Sydney
