= Henry Dangar =

Australian explorer (1796–1861)

Henry Dangar (1796–1861) was traditionally famous as a surveyor and explorer of Australia in the early period of British colonisation, but he was deeply complicit in the perpetration of mass murder, in the brutal massacre of innocent women, children and old men. See 'Myall Creek Massacre' below. In subsequent attempts to bring the perpetrators to trial, Dangar used his influence to orchestrate several perversions of the course of justice, in attempts to influence the outcome of the trials. In this he was a ferocious opponent of John Henry Plunket, who was the Attorney-General of NSW at the time.

Despite, or because of this appalling criminality and corruption, he became a landholder of vast estates, a successful pastoralist and businessman. Dangar also served as a magistrate and politician. In 1845 he was first elected as a Member of the New South Wales Legislative Council and served until 1851.

== Early life ==
He was born on 18 November 1796 at St Neot, Cornwall. Having studied as a surveyor, he was the first of six brothers to emigrate as free settlers to the Colony of New South Wales (now part of Australia).

== Government surveyor and explorer ==
Soon after arrival in the Jessie on 2 April 1821, Dangar was appointed assistant government surveyor under John Oxley. He was employed in the counties of Camden and Argyle.

In 1822, Dangar was transferred to Newcastle to survey the Hunter Valley in preparation for British pastoral occupation. He prepared the plans of King's Town (Newcastle). In the next two years, he measured and marked out village reserves, church lands, and allocations for settlers along the lower branches of the Hunter River and as far north as Patrick's Plains.

From 1824 he surveyed the road from Newcastle to Wallis Plains (Maitland), measuring reserves and grants and working steadily northwards, past the confluence of the Goulburn and Hunter rivers until he reached the hitherto uncolonised upper districts of the Hunter River. There he explored the present sites of Muswellbrook, Aberdeen and Scone. After crossing the Hunter River just to the north-west of the present site of Aberdeen, he named the Dart Brook and Kingdon Ponds, two tributaries that flow from the north.

Dangar followed Dart Brook to its source, and crossed the Liverpool Range to the plains beyond. He turned back when attacked by the Geawegal clan of the Wanaruah people west of where the town of Murrurundi later developed.

His report on the quality of land on the plains caused an immediate rush of applicants for land grants. On this journey he sighted a domed feature that he named Mt Cupola. It was renamed Mount Dangar by explorer Allan Cunningham, who became the first European to climb it the following year.

Cornish place names, scattered through the Hunter Region, mark Henry Dangar's surveys and record his deep affection for his birthplace.

== Dismissal after investigation into land appropriation ==
In 1825, Dangar was commissioned by the government to allocate land grants to colonists along the Hunter River and its tributaries, which he had previously surveyed. During this process, he assigned to himself and his brother William prime land at Dart Brook. The prominent colonial land agent Peter MacIntyre believed he had prior claim to this territory.

A board of enquiry found Dangar guilty of using his public position for private gain and he was dismissed from office on 31 March 1827. Governor Sir Ralph Darling recommended that he be dispossessed of the land under dispute and required to take his grant in some other district. He returned to England to appeal against this recommendation. John Oxley supported him in his appeal, but it was unsuccessful.

Despite these adverse findings against him, Dangar received two other grants of land for his services as a surveyor – 300 acres (121 ha) named 'Neotsfield' and 700 acres (283 ha) near Morpeth, known as 'Baroona'. When he sailed to England in 1828, he left his estates in the hands of his brother, William.

On returning to Australia with his new wife, Grace Sibly, he was granted further parcels of land at Kingdon Ponds, and in the Port Stephens area. He had completed survey work for the Australian Agricultural Company there up to 1833.

== Surveyor for the Australian Agricultural Company ==
During the voyage to England Dangar wrote his Index and Directory to Map of the Country Bordering Upon the River Hunter, which was published in London in 1828. It demonstrated his skill as a cartographer and ability as a surveyor, attracting the attention of the directors of the Australian Agricultural Company. They offered him an appointment as a surveyor to the company, which he accepted. Accompanied by his wife Grace, whom he married at St Neot on 13 May 1828, and their infant son, he returned in April 1830 to take up his new position at Port Stephens.

Dangar produced topographical and soil reports on the company's grants, and surveyed its 400,000 acres (161,874 ha) reserve north of the Manning River. His reports of this area were so unfavourable that he was sent to explore, as an alternative location, the Liverpool Plains districts originally recommended to the company by John Oxley. From the headwaters of the Manning River, he crossed the Great Dividing Range to the Liverpool Plains, and selected an extensive area of attractive land for the company's consideration. After some negotiation the company's claim to the land was accepted by the government. In June 1833 Dangar retired to his property, Neotsfield, near Singleton.

== Pastoralist and businessman ==
His brother William Dangar had been managing Neotsfield, and it was a flourishing and highly developed farm. Dangar quickly extended his interests, purchasing additional grazing properties and leasing extensive runs, which by 1850 amounted to more than 300,000 acres (121,406 ha). These included:

- Gostwyck (near Uralla) 48,000 acres (19,425 ha)
- Paradise Creek 32,000 acres (12,950 ha)
- Bald Hills 19,200 acres (7,770 ha)
- Moonbi 25,000 acres (10,117 ha)
- Buleori 64,000 acres (25,900 ha)
- Karee 64,000 acres (25,900 ha)
- Myall Creek 48,000 acres (19,425 ha)

Along the Great North Road to Liverpool Plains, he acquired town allotments and established inns and stores. At Newcastle he had boiling-down works and meat-preserving and tinning works. In New Zealand he established a steam flour-mill near the wheat farms around Official Bay (Auckland).

== Myall Creek Massacre ==
The Myall Creek Massacre took place in 1838 on a station owned by Dangar.

Dangar advised two of the witnesses, George Anderson and William Hobbs, not to report the crime. Anderson was a convict assigned to Dangar, while Hobbs was a free man in Dangar's employ. Dangar said at the trial of twelve defendants that he had given Anderson 100 lashes. When Hobbs ignored Dangar's advice and alerted the local magistrate, Dangar terminated his service. But Dangar testified at the trial that the termination was not connected with Hobbs's actions related to the massacre.

=== Efforts to pervert the course of justice ===
During the trial of the accused men, Dangar exercised his power and influence in order to sway the outcome. Dangar and his fellow squatters had established a secret society, the "Black Association", in their fight against the Aboriginal people over land. The group included Robert Scott, a wealthy landowner, businessman, and part owner of The Sydney Herald. As the court case began, the group served as a defence fund.

In addition, the Black Association orchestrated and funded a smear campaign, particularly via The Sydney Herald. It was aimed at influencing public opinion against the prosecution on the case. At the first hearing, the group arranged for the erroneous arrest for debt of Hobbs, a key witness. They also paid jurors not to attend, and at the second trial, the court had difficulty collecting a jury. This resulted in an empty jury box on one morning of the hearing.

At the second trial of seven suspects, on additional charges, all were convicted; they were later executed by hanging. The four remaining suspects were remanded to allow time for the main witness, an Aboriginal boy named Yintayintin or Davey, to be prepared in order to take a Bible oath. By some accounts, missionary Lancelot Edward Threlkeld said that Dangar had arranged for Davey "to be put out of the way", and he was never seen again. When the prosecution was unable to locate Davey, they could not proceed and discharged the four suspects in February 1839.

But Threlkeld wrote the following about Davey:

" ... for Mr Arndell, who was here last week, states that on his recent return from the Gwyder he was informed by a Gentleman that Davey was put out of the way, but whether with his throat cut, or only hid, could not be ascertained”.

Further, when the remaining four accused came before the Court on 14 February 1839, Attorney General Plunkett informed the Court:

“ … [Davey] had been under the tuition of a competent person for two months, but it was now reported to [the Attorney General] that he was not so far instructed as to be a competent witness, and it was quite uncertain when he would be; and he [the Attorney General] did not think he should be doing his duty in risking public justice by prosecuting the case without his evidence.

…

I cannot proceed with the trial with any hope of success without [Davey’s] evidence … ”.

== Magistrate and politician ==
Dangar was a magistrate and member of the district council for a number of years. He devoted much time and energy to the agricultural and political advancement of the Hunter valley. In 1843 he was nominated for the electoral district comprising the counties of Hunter, Brisbane and Bligh in the first elective Legislative Council, but was defeated by William Dumaresq.

In 1845 he was elected to the New South Wales Legislative Council as the member for the County of Northumberland. He remained a member of the council until 1851, when he retired from public life.

In 1847 Henry Dangar together with his brothers Richard and William, under the management of cousin Charles Gedye, began a meat-canning factory at Honeysuckle Point, Newcastle. They established the Newcastle Meat Preserving Company after a severe drought caused a decline in cattle and sheep prices. Although the business won awards at the Great Exhibition of 1851 in London, and exported their product to India and California, the company ceased to operate by 1855.

== Death and legacy ==
Dangar died in Sydney on 2 March 1861 and was buried locally in a family vault. A year later his remains were exhumed and reinterred at a new vault at Singleton.

Mount Dangar, Dangarfield, Dangar Falls, and Dangarsleigh were named to commemorate him. All of these naming are worthy of reconsideration in the light of Dangar's record.

New South Wales Legislative Council
Preceded by William Foster	Member for Northumberland; June 1843 – October 1845	Electoral district merged into Northumberland and Hunter
