= George Bowman (Australian politician) =

Australian politician (1795–1878)

George Bowman (1795 East Lothian, Scotland – 26 August 1878 Richmond, New South Wales, Australia) was a pastoralist, benefactor of Richmond and politician in the colony of New South Wales.

He was the eldest son of John Bowman, a pioneer settler from East Lothian in Scotland, and his wife Honor née Honey, from Cornwall.

His brother William Bowman (1799–1874), also a Member of the first Legislative Council and also a Member of the Legislative Assembly. George Bowman was the father with Eliza Sophia née Pearce of George Pearce Bowman (1821–1870), pastoralist, Robert Bowman (1830–1873), medical practitioner, and Alexander Bowman (1838–1892) (also a Member of the Legislative Assembly), parliamentarian, the eldest, fifth and seventh sons, pioneers of the Hawkesbury region.

He was an elected member of the New South Wales Legislative Council from 1 September 1851 to 29 February 1856 for the Counties of Northumberland and Hunter.

New South Wales Legislative Council
New title Merger of the electoral districts of Northumberland and Hunter	Member for Northumberland and Hunter; 1851–1856; With: Henry Douglass	creation of NSW Legislative Assembly
