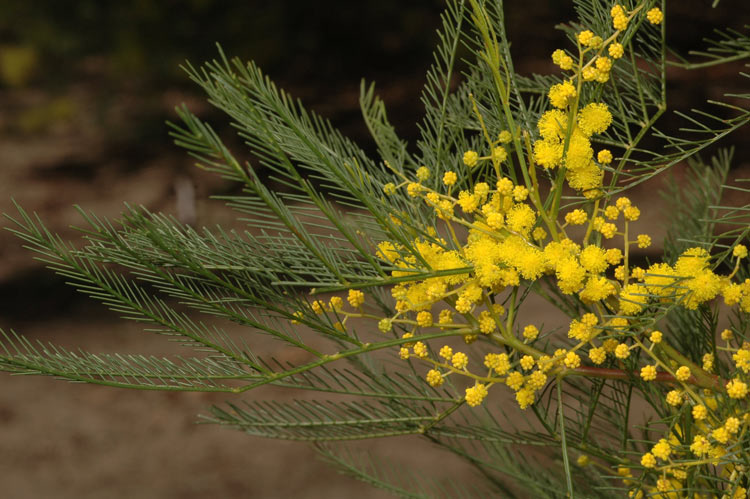
- In the Australian National Botanic Gardens

Conservation status
- Critically endangered (EPBC Act)

Scientific classification
- Kingdom: Plantae
- Clade: Tracheophytes
- Clade: Angiosperms
- Clade: Eudicots
- Clade: Rosids
- Order: Fabales
- Family: Fabaceae
- Subfamily: Caesalpinioideae
- Clade: Mimosoid clade
- Genus: Acacia
- Species: A. dangarensis

Binomial name
- Acacia dangarensis Tindale & Kodela
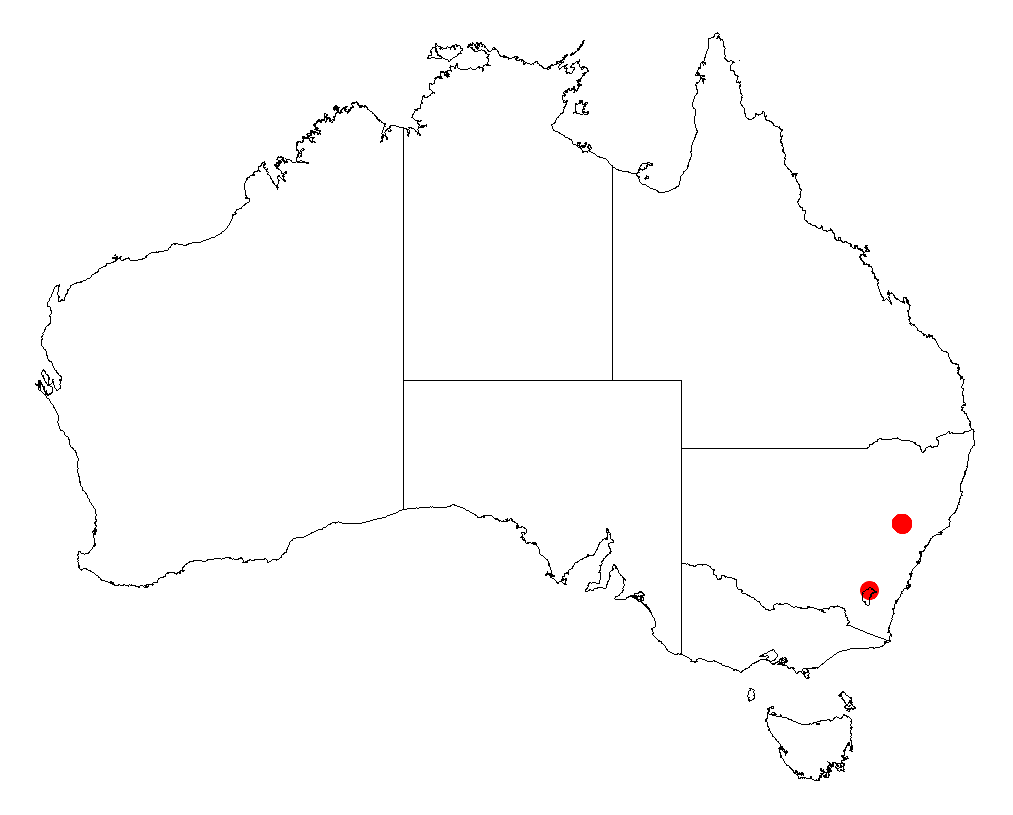
- Occurrence data from AVH

Synonyms
- Racosperma dangarense (Tindale & Kodela) Pedley

= Acacia dangarensis =

Mount Dangar wattle

Species of legume

Acacia dangarensis, commonly known as Mount Dangar wattle, is a species of flowering plant in the family Fabaceae and is endemic to a restricted area of New South Wales, Australia. It is tree with bipinnate leaves, heads of golden yellow flowers and straight, glabrous pods.

== Description ==
Acacia dangarensis is a tree that typically grows to a height of up to 10 m (33 ft) and has smooth grey bark, later corrugated and blackish. Its branchlets are terete, glabrous, ridged and have many lenticels. The leaves are bipinnate and frond-like on a petiole 7–47 mm (0.28–1.85 in) long. Each leaf has 2 to 6 pairs of pinnae 30–78 mm (1.2–3.1 in) long, with 14 to 30 pinnules 4–9 mm (0.16–0.35 in) long. There is usually a gland at the base of the pinnae. The flowers are golden yellow and borne in heads of 12 to 26 flowers on peduncles 1–4 mm (0.039–0.157 in) long. Flowering has been recorded in August and September, and the pods are more or less straight, barely constricted between the seeds, 30–80 mm (1.2–3.1 in) long and 5–7 mm (0.20–0.28 in) wide, light brown to black and glabrous.

== Taxonomy ==
Acacia dangarensis was first formally described in 1991 by Mary Tindale and Phillip Kodela in Australian Systematic Botany from specimens collected by Roger Coveny on Mount Dangar, 7.5 km (4.7 mi) west of Sandy Hollow in 1979. The specific epithet (dangarensis) refers to the type location, where this species is only known to occur.

== Distribution and habitat ==
Mount Dangar wattle grows in woodland on the basalt summit and rocky slopes of Mount Dangar in Goulburn River National Park, with Eucalyptus moluccana and E. albens.

== Conservation status ==
Acacia dangarensis is listed as "critically endangered" under the Australian Government Environment Protection and Biodiversity Conservation Act 1999 and the New South Wales Government Threatened Species Conservation Act 1995.

== See also ==
- List of Acacia species
