= Helena Scott =

Australian artist (1832–1910)

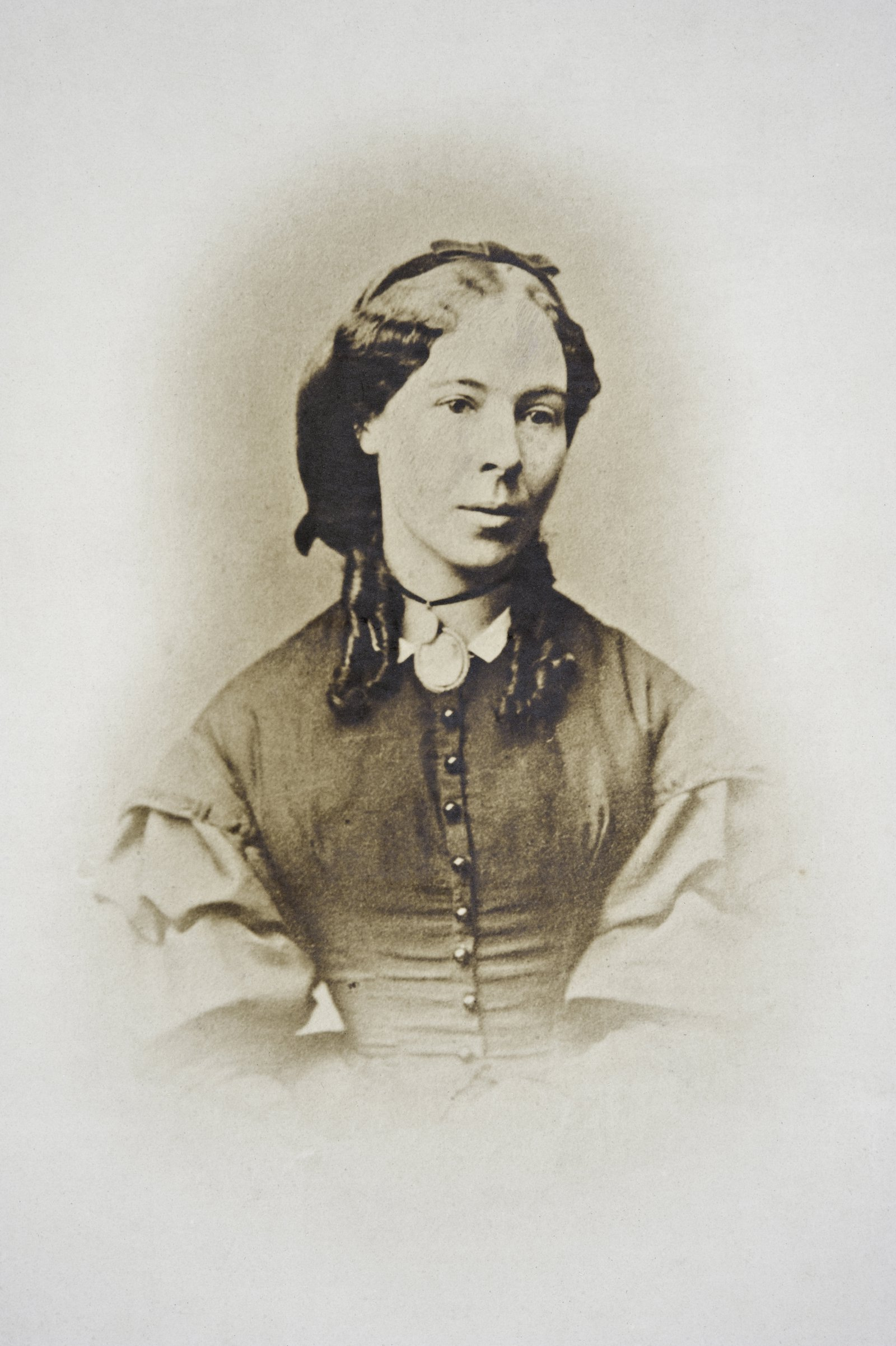
- Born: 11 April 1832; Sydney, Australia
- Died: 24 November 1910 (aged 78); Harris Park, NSW, Australia
- Other name: Helena Forde
- Known for: Natural history illustration
- Spouse: Edward Forde
- Parents: Alexander Walker Scott; Harriet Calcott
- Relatives: Harriet Morgan (sister)

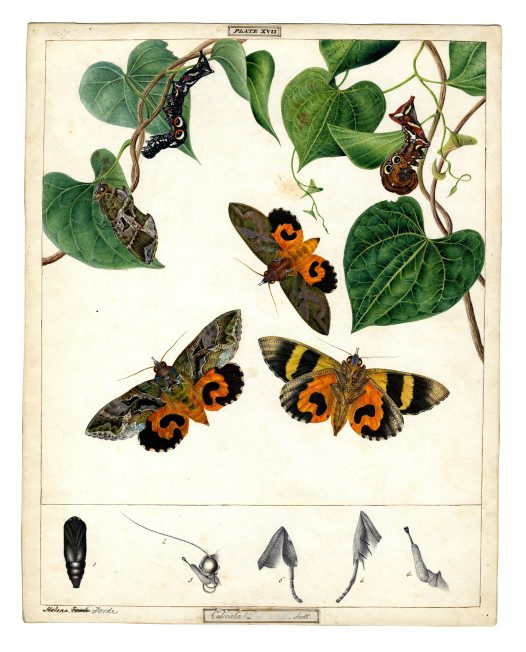
Fruit-piercing moth, Eudocima phalonia

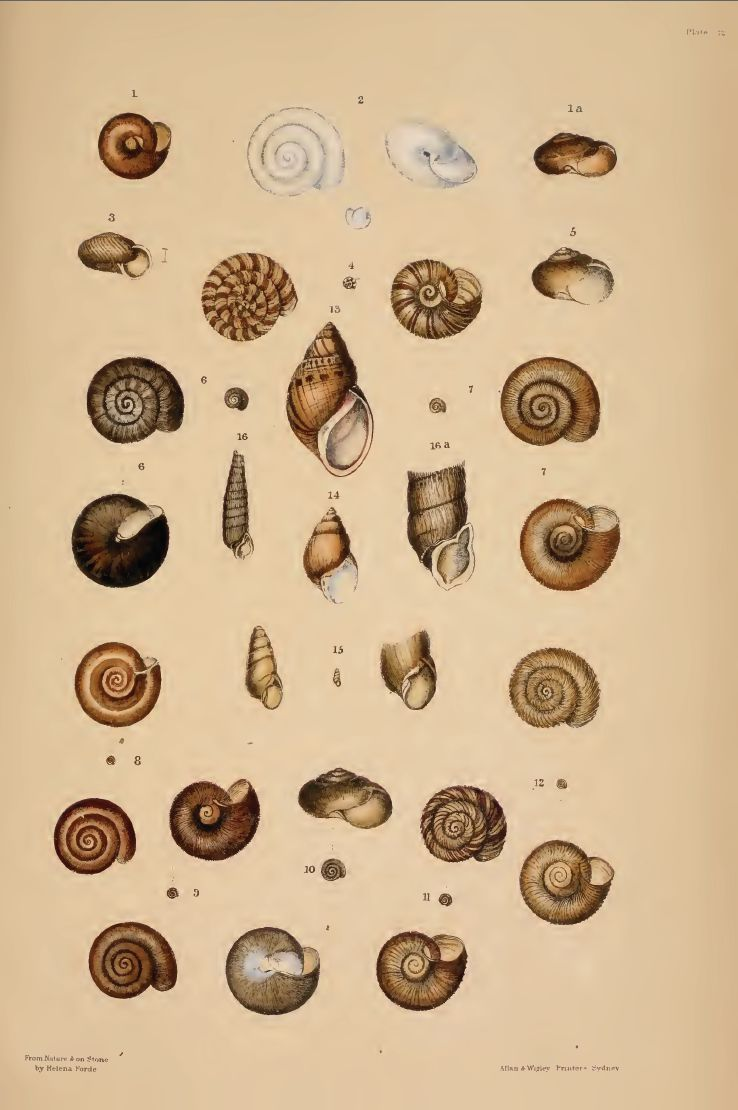
Plate from James Charles Cox's Monograph of Australian Land Shells

Helena "Nellie" Scott (1832 – 1910) was an Australian illustrator of natural history. She was also a botanical collector who collected a number of type specimens. She and her sister Harriet Morgan (1830–1907) were the daughters of the Australian entomologist Alexander Walker Scott.

== Family life ==
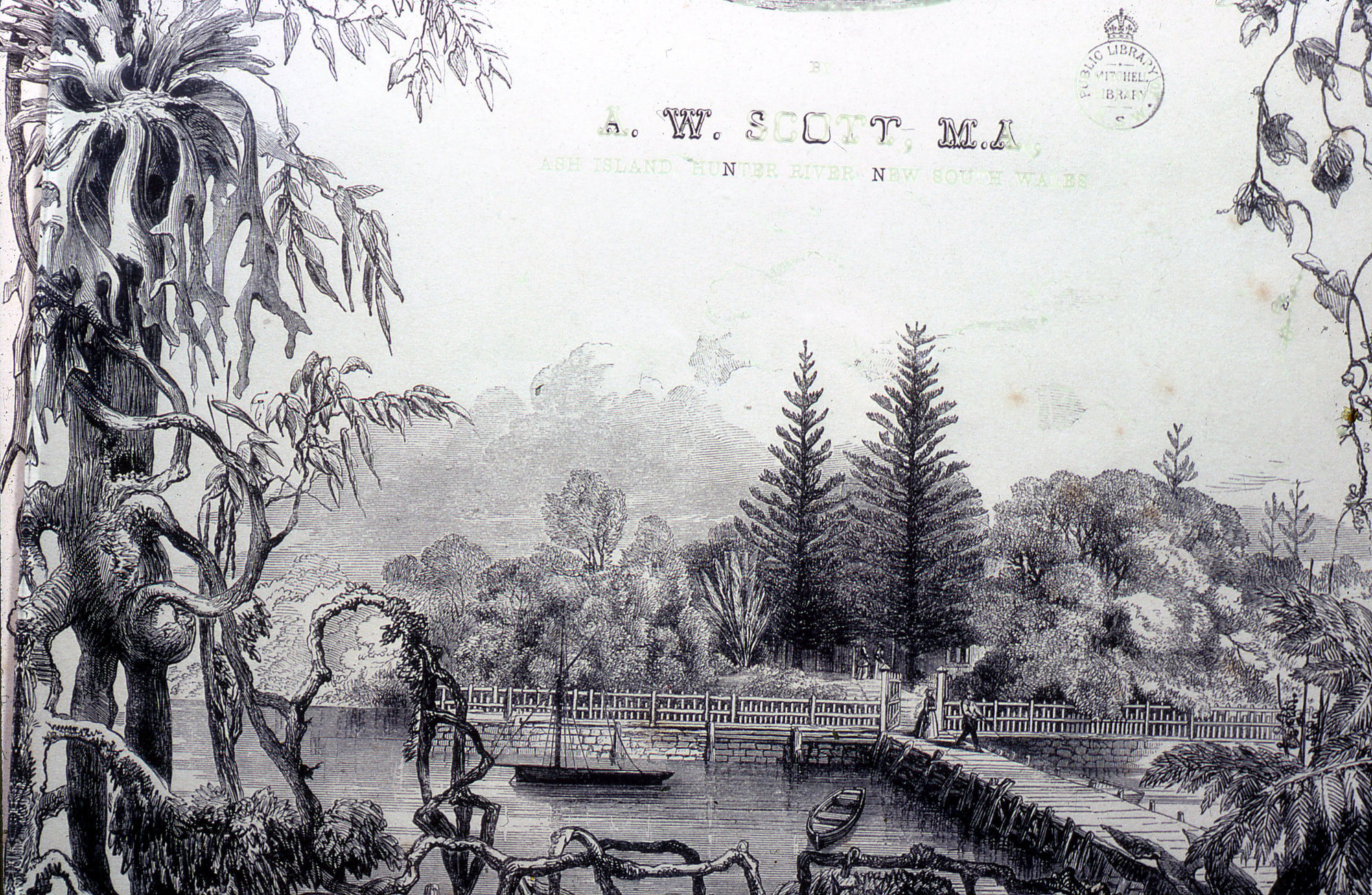
Ash Island (A.W. Scott)

Although born in Sydney, by 1846 the family moved from there to the remote Ash Island in the Hunter River estuary, near Hexham. Located in an untouched area of native vegetation and wildlife, they flourished under the guidance of their artistic father and Harriet Calcott, their mother. For a period of some 20 years, they remained on the island, documenting its plants and wildlife, with an emphasis on the butterflies and moths.

Harriet and Helena kept detailed records which are held by the Australian Museum Archives. They compiled a handwritten catalogue in 1862 entitled "The Indigenous Botany of Ash Island", a list of their well-preserved botanical specimens. Their striking depictions and descriptions of the island's moths and butterflies attest to the enormous dedication of the family to their self-imposed project.

A glimpse into the daily lives of the two sisters is provided by the meticulous records they kept. Together with their father, they collected live specimens from their neighbourhood, then determined the proper food plants to take back home and feed the hungry creatures. They then conducted a lively correspondence with various specialists to pin down the identities of the problematic species. Their father gave them full credit for their achievements, praising the quality of the drawings that showed the insects in all their various stages.

The 1860s had also brought dark days for Helena – her mother's death, her father's bankruptcy and the death of her husband, Edward Forde, whom she had married in 1864. Facing enormous financial problems, the family were forced to leave their island home. The sisters were now obliged to seek payment for their work. While finishing some plates of birds' eggs for Edward Ramsay in 1866, Harriet asked "above all ... let nobody know you are paying me for doing them for you." She eventually married Dr Cosby William Morgan in 1882, but the widowed Helena continued to struggle financially. Both sisters continued to illustrate commercially for the rest of their lives. Harriet produced botanical illustrations for the 1879, 1884 and 1886 editions of the "Railway Guide to New South Wales", and both were involved in the production of Australia's first Christmas cards in 1879.

Helena died in Harris Park in 1910 leaving no descendants.

== Professional illustrators ==
By 1864, a large number of plates of moths and butterflies had been completed, ready for the publication of the first volume of their father's Australian Lepidoptera and Their Transformations. A number of illustrating commissions sprang from this work, some from their father's contacts as trustee of the Australian Museum. They provided the illustrations for James Charles Cox's Monograph of Australian Land Shells (1868), and for Gerard Krefft's Snakes of Australia (1869) and Mammals of Australia (1871) – the artwork from these publications was singled out for praise at the Sydney Intercolonial Exhibition in 1870.

When the prominent natural historian William Swainson examined the growing number of paintings a decade earlier, he wrote in the Sydney Morning Herald,

these drawings are equal to any I have ever seen by modern artists ... every tuft of hair in the caterpillar, the silken webs of the cocoon, or the delicate and often intricate pencillings on the wings of a moth, stand out with a prominence of relief which it is perfectly impossible to reproduce by simple water colours [...].

The museum purchased the 100 completed plates for £200 in 1884. The standard of their work led to their being elected honorary members of the Entomological Society.

The Australian Museum were persuaded to publish the remainder of the Lepidoptera material, which they had purchased in 1884, together with the sisters' drawings, diaries and notes. Under Helena's supervision, and working with museum entomologist Arthur Sidney Olliff, the second volume of the Lepidoptera was published in five parts between 1890 and 1898. The two sisters did most of the lithography for this volume, which was then printed by the Australian Museum, and sent to England to be hand coloured, using the sisters' paintings as colour benchmark.

Helena, with her sister Harriet, were largely forgotten until the 2011 exhibition Beauty from Nature: Art of the Scott Sisters at the Australian Museum in Sydney.

Forde Place in the Canberra suburb of Chisholm is named in her honour.

== Plant collections ==
Both Helena and her sister collected for Ferdinand von Mueller, receiving in response, names for the plants they drew. Her collections include type specimens for Kochia sedifolia, Diospyros pentamera (as Cargillia pentamera), Atriplex stipitata, and Poa fordeana.

== Gallery ==
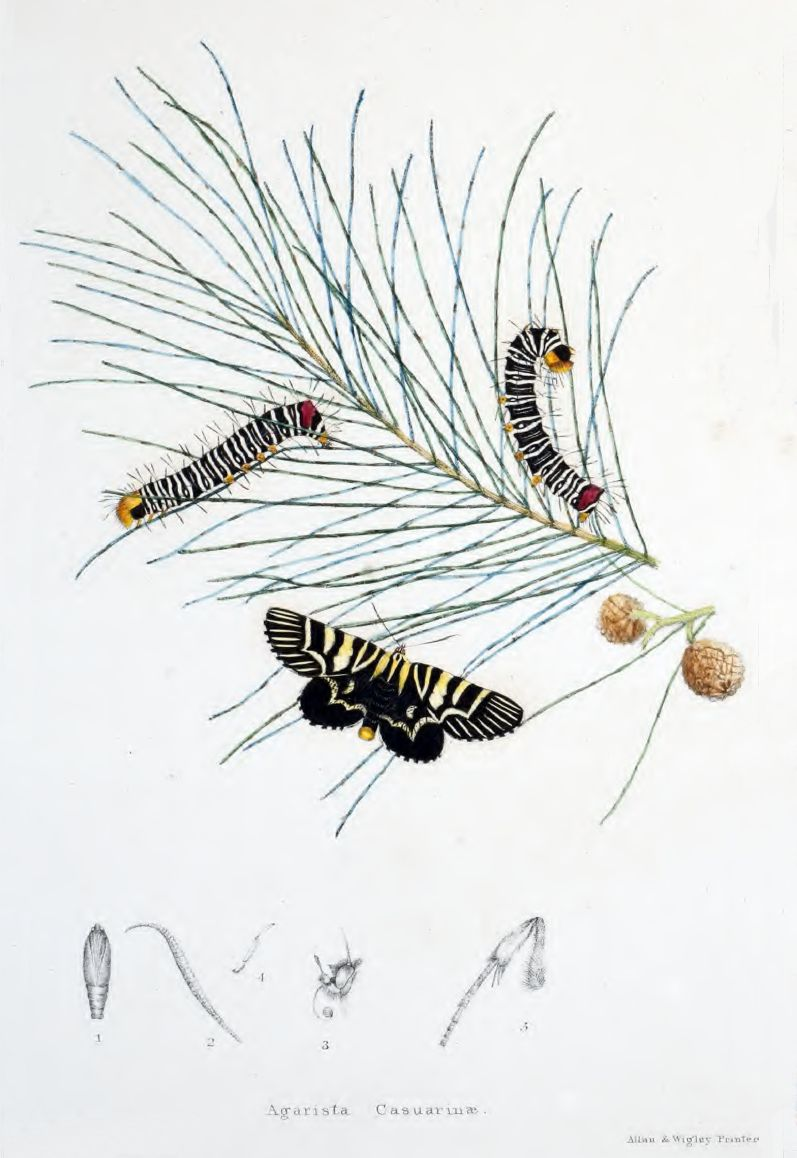

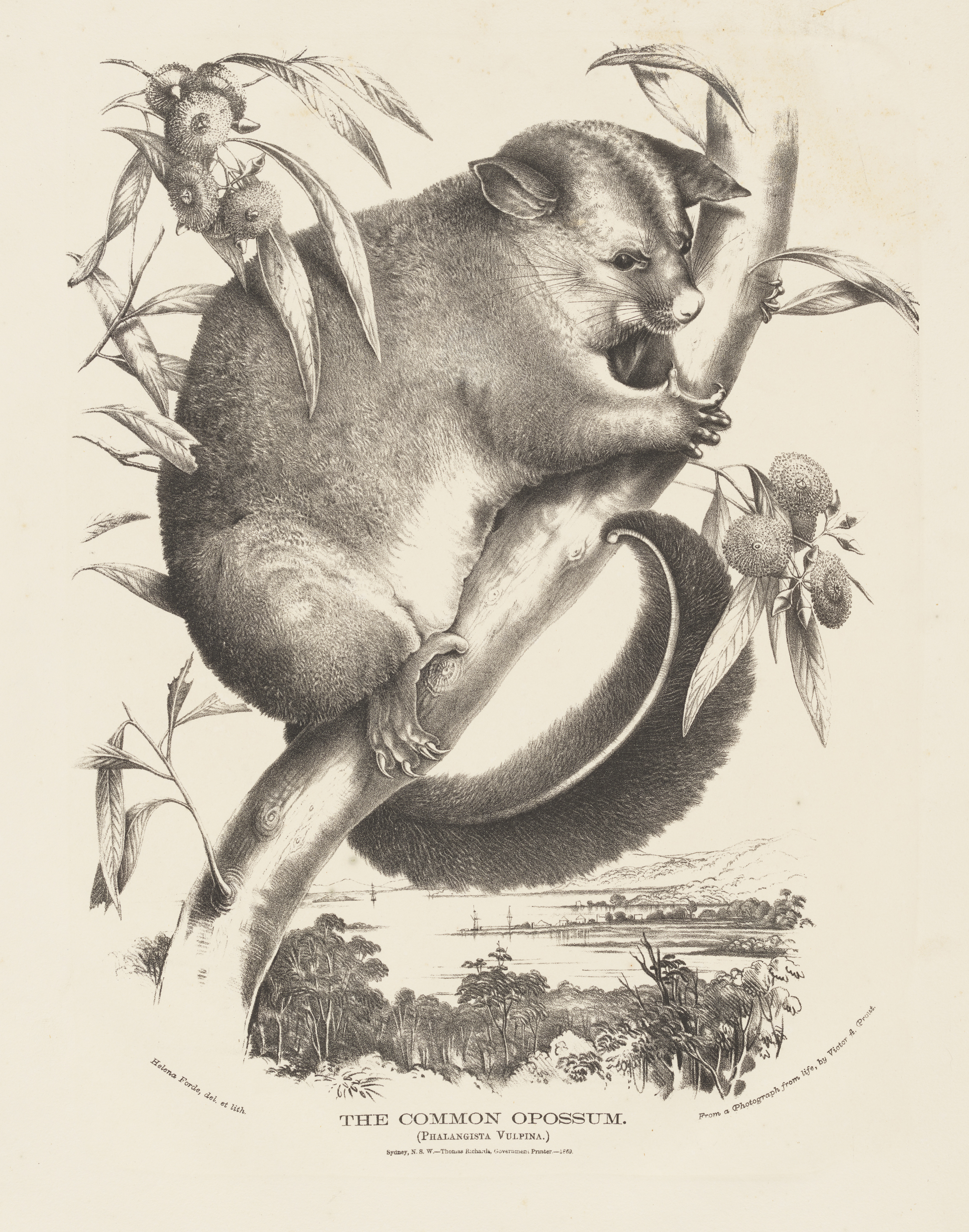

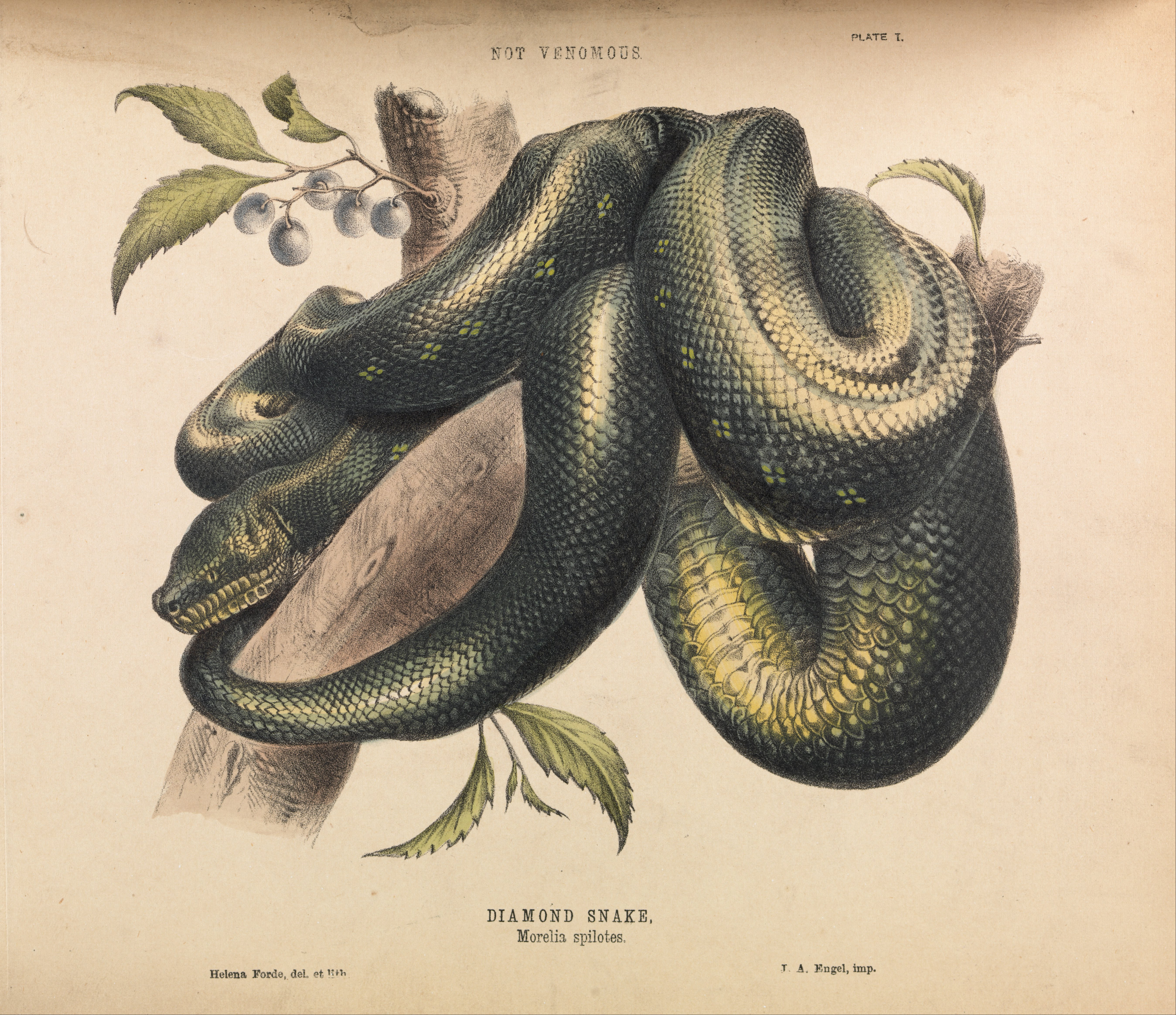
Diamond Snake, Morelia spilotes illustration from The Snakes of Australia by Gerard Krefft

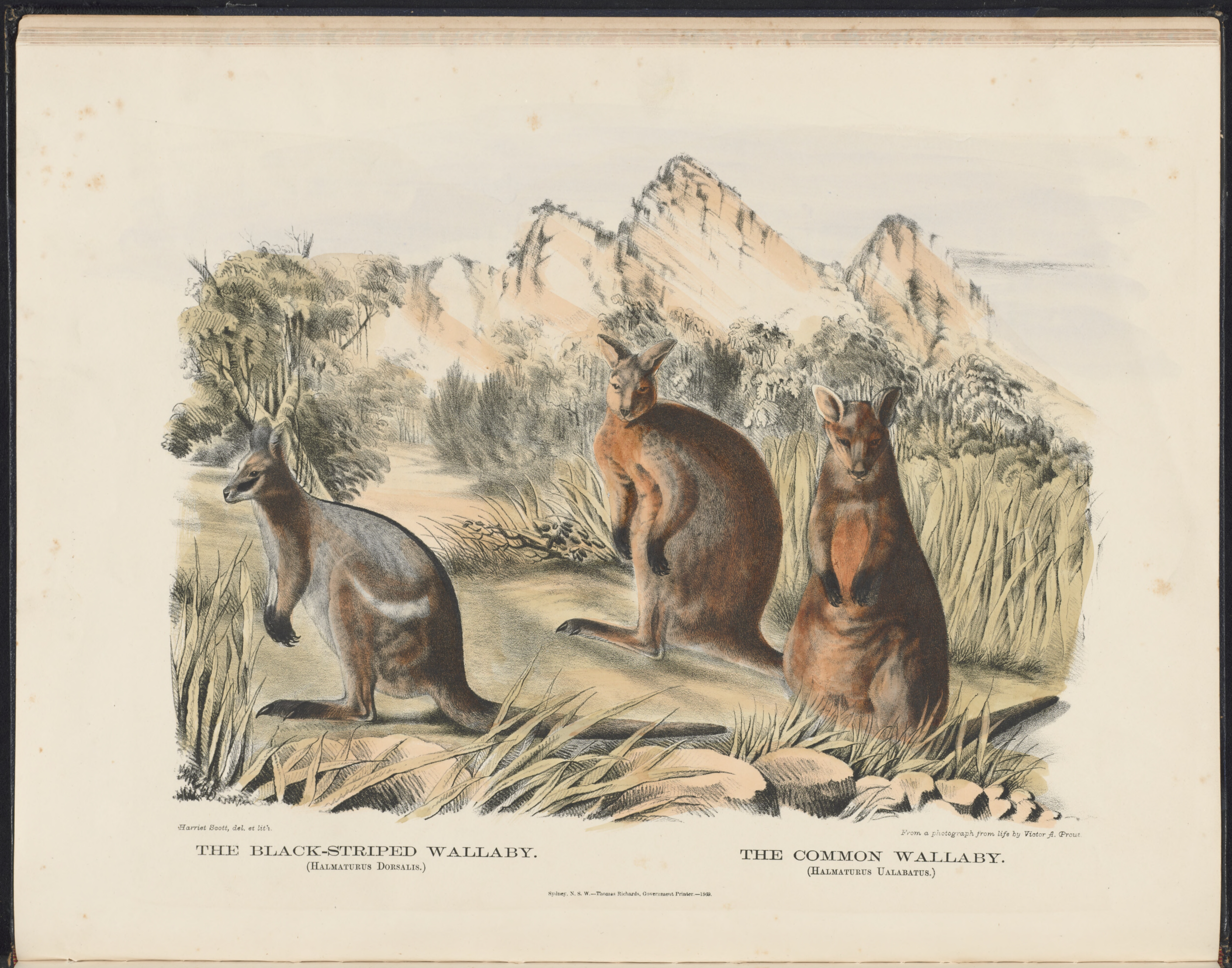
Krefft, Gerard (1871) The Mammals of Australia. Illustrated by Miss Harriett Scott, and Mrs. Helena Forde

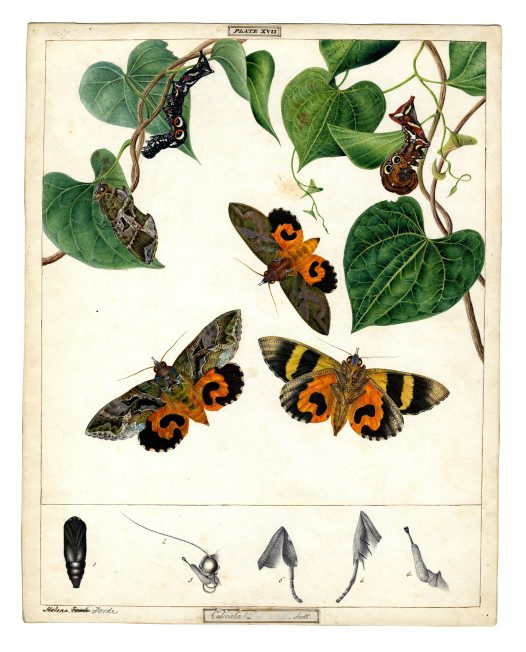
Fruit-piercing Moth, (Eudocima fullonia), Noctuidae, Lepidoptera, 1869 Helena Scott (1832–1910)
