= Henry Douglass =

Irish-born Australian medical doctor and politician

Henry Grattan Douglass

Member of the New South Wales Legislative Council
- In office 1851–1856

Member of the New South Wales Legislative Council
- In office 1856–1861

Personal details
- Born: 1790 Dublin, Ireland
- Died: December 1, 1865 (aged 74–75) Sydney, New South Wales, Australia
- Spouse: Hester Murphy
- Children: 3
- Occupation: Medical doctor, politician

Henry Grattan Douglass (1790 – 1 December 1865) was an Irish-born Australian medical doctor and politician.

== Personal life ==
He was born in Dublin to apothecary Adam Douglass and Ann Edwards. He studied medicine and qualified fully in 1819. In 1812 he married Hester Murphy, with whom he had three children. In 1821 he migrated to New South Wales and became in charge of a hospital at Parramatta, also conducting his own private practice.

== Career ==
He was a supporter of the faction known as 'the Exclusives'—wealthy landholders who supported Governor Ralph Darling—and was made Clerk of the Legislative Council and Commissioner of the Court of Requests. These appointments enraged the opposing 'Emancipists' faction, who thought him unqualified for these roles and just another beneficiary of what they viewed as the favouritism and cronyism of Darling's administration. Paradoxically, as a result of his political involvement, he fell out with Darling.

Douglass was given a grant of land, near to the Endrick River, in the area now known as Nerriga. However, after, probably unwisely, he had become involved in the political manoeuvres of the colony he effectively had been forced to leave the colony—temporarily it transpired—by Governor Darling. Douglass's land grant was then cancelled, in his absence, by Darling, and it was then granted to another settler, John Mackenzie, in June 1836.

== Later life and death ==
He was involved in the foundation of the University of Sydney and was also a tenant on 7,800 acres of crown land. From 1851 to 1856 he was an elected member of the New South Wales Legislative Council; he was also a member of the reconstituted Council from 1856 to 1861. Douglass died in Sydney in 1865.

New South Wales Legislative Council
New title Merger of the electoral districts of Northumberland and Hunter	Member for Northumberland and Hunter; 1851–1856; With: George Bowman	creation of NSW Legislative Assembly
