= Hovenden Hely =

Australian politician (1823–1872)

Hovendon Hely

Personal details
- Born: 1 January 1823 Tullamore, Ireland
- Died: 8 October 1872 (aged 49) St Leonards, New South Wales, Australia
- Parent: Frederick Augustus Hely (father)

Hovenden Hely (1823 – 8 October 1872) was an Australian explorer and politician. He was a member of the New South Wales Legislative Assembly for one term between 1856 and 1857.

== Early life ==
Hely was the son of Frederick Augustus Hely, an Irish public servant who was appointed as the Superintendent of Convicts in 1823. He was educated at The King's School, Parramatta and was initially employed as a clerk in the Colonial Secretary's office. He took part in the 1846-47 expedition of Ludwig Leichhardt but was accused by Leichhardt of indolence, disloyalty and "disgusting" behaviour. Nonetheless, he was put in charge of the official expedition to find Leichhardt in 1852. After 1841 Hely managed his deceased father's estates in the Brisbane Water district including Wyoming Cottage. He inherited a fifth share of the estate when he turned 21 and borrowed heavily against it, to finance a trip to England in 1858. As a result of these debts, Hely was bankrupted in 1865.

== Colonial Parliament ==
In 1856 Hely was elected as one of the three members for Northumberland and Hunter in the first New South Wales Legislative Assembly under responsible government. His parliamentary performance was uninspiring and he did not hold office. He did not contest the next election in 1858.

New South Wales Legislative Assembly
Preceded by First election	Member for Northumberland and Hunter; 1856 – 1858; Served alongside: Scott, Piddington	Succeeded by George White
