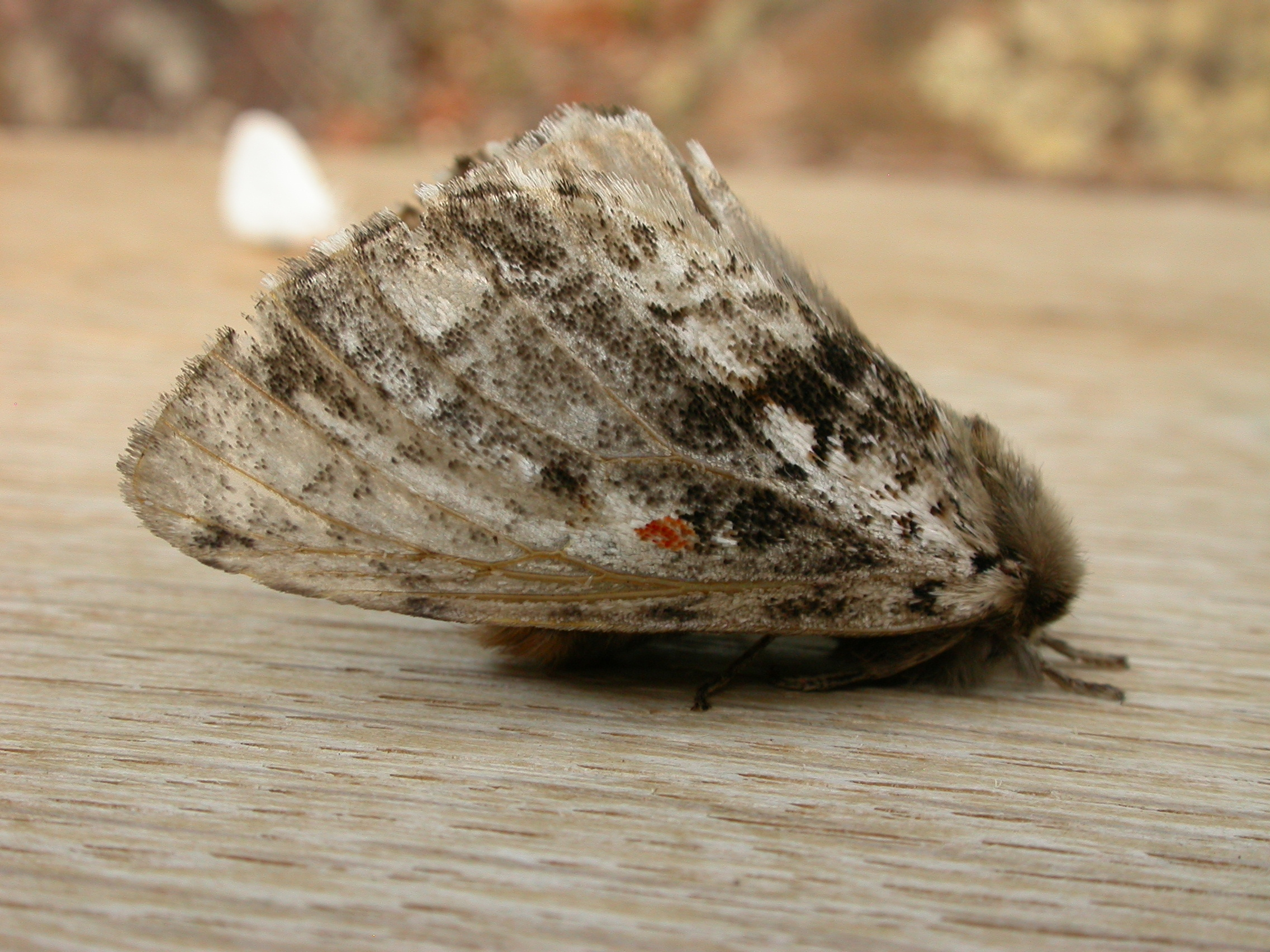

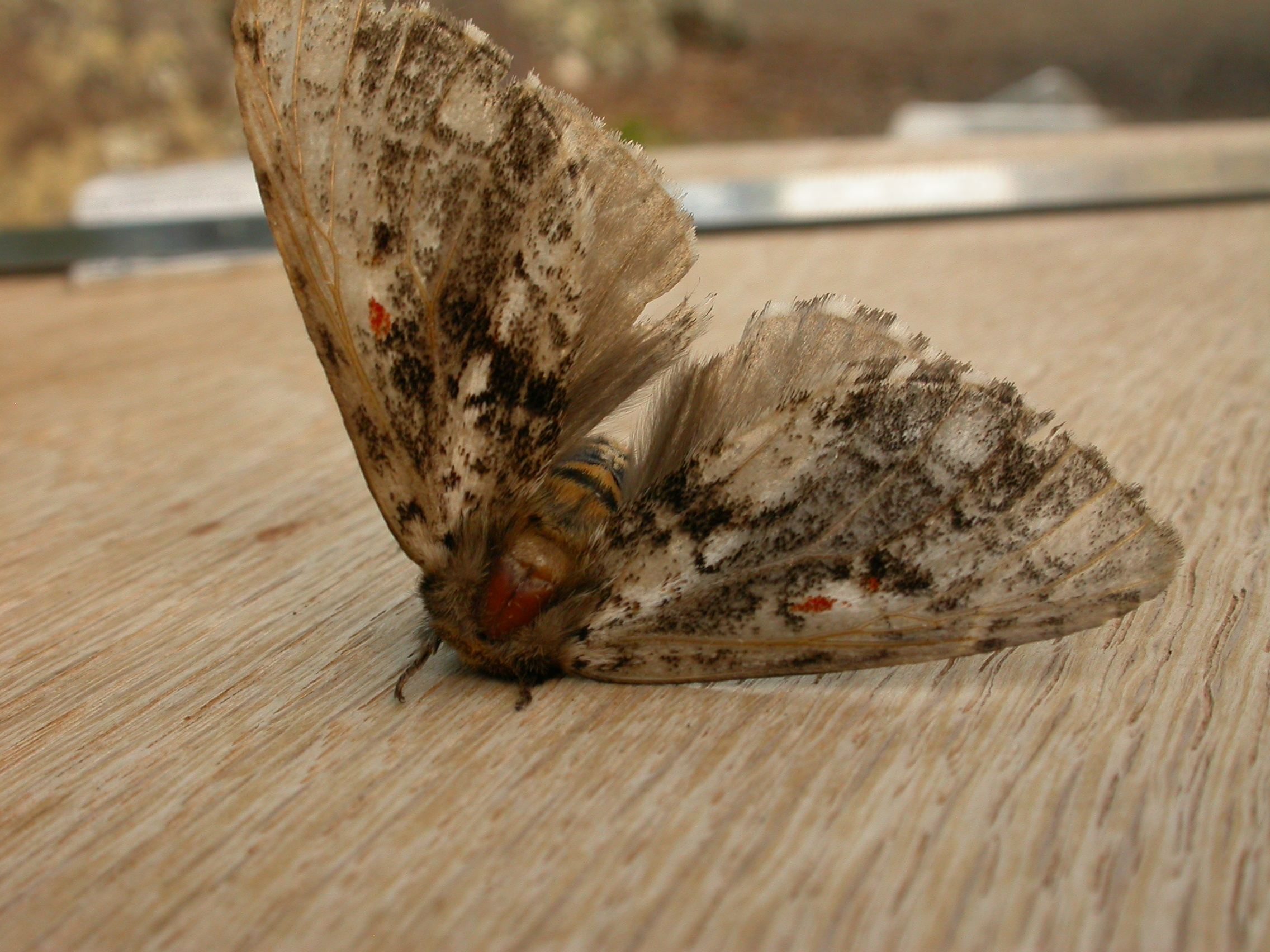

Scientific classification
- Kingdom: Animalia
- Phylum: Arthropoda
- Clade: Pancrustacea
- Class: Insecta
- Order: Lepidoptera
- Superfamily: Noctuoidea
- Family: Notodontidae
- Genus: Aglaosoma
- Species: A. variegata

Binomial name
- Aglaosoma variegata (Walker, 1855)

Synonyms
- Teara variegata Walker, 1855; Aglaosoma lauta Scott, 1864

= Aglaosoma variegata =

Species of moth

Aglaosoma variegata, the patterned notodontid, is a species of moth of the family Notodontidae first described by Francis Walker in 1855. It is known from the Australian states of New South Wales, Queensland and Victoria.

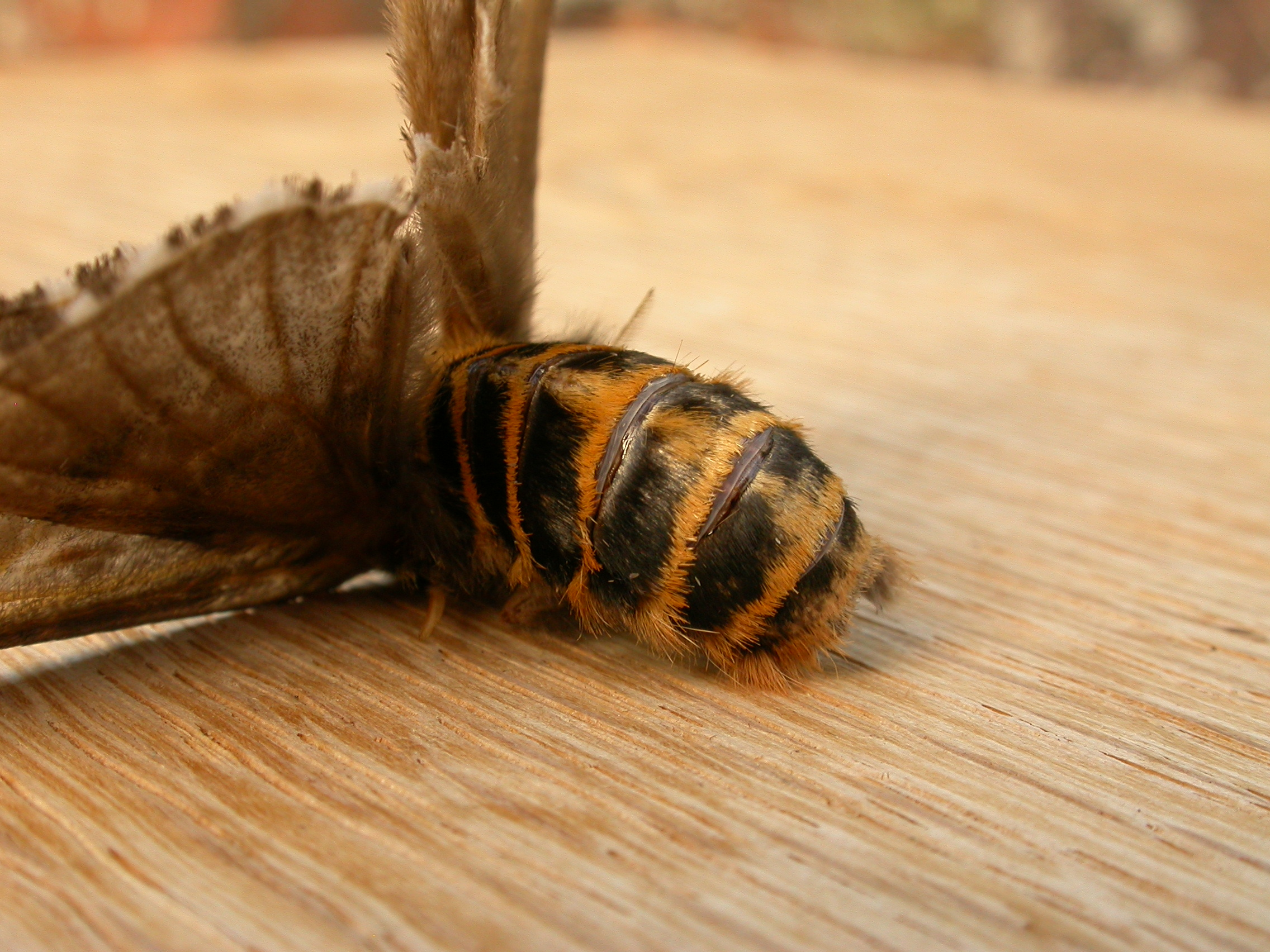

Adults have forewings with a striking pattern of cream and dark brown. The hindwings are cream with brown spots along the margin.

The larvae feed on various plants, including Acacia longifolia and Banksia ericifolia.
