= Results of the 1859 New South Wales colonial election =

Colonial election for New South Wales, Australia in 1859

New South Wales colonial election, 9 June 1859 – 7 July 1859 Legislative Assembly << 1858–1860 >>
Enrolled voters	78,231				
Votes cast	52,153		Turnout	52.54 (Note: There were 15 uncontested districts and turnout is based on the roll of 65,630 for the contested districts.)	+9.45
Informal votes	26		Informal	0.08	+0.08
Summary of votes by party
Party	Primary votes	%	Swing	Seats	Change
Total	52,153			80	

The 1859 New South Wales colonial election was for 80 members representing 67 electoral districts. The election was conducted on the basis of a simple majority or first-past-the-post voting system. In this election there were 9 multi-member districts returning 22 members and 58 single member districts. In the multi-member districts each elector could vote for as many candidates as there were vacancies. 15 districts were uncontested.

The electoral districts and boundaries were established under the Electoral Act 1858 (NSW), The changes included an increase in the number of members from 54 to 80 and an increase in the number of districts from 54 to 67, with 62 new districts and only five of the former districts remained. (Note: The five remaining districts were Argyle, Monara, The Murray, The Murrumbidgee and Parramatta.) The 62 new districts were based on the established Police districts. The new districts included three districts for people with a mining or business licence in the goldfields, Goldfields North, Goldfields South and Goldfields West, which did not have a residential or property qualification. The average number of enrolled voters per seat in the other districts was 1,394 ranging from The Paterson (536) to The Lachlan (3,592).

Queensland separated from NSW in December 1859 and the 10 members elected for the 9 Queensland seats ceased to sit. (Note: The Queensland seats were The Burnett, Brisbane, Darling Downs, East Moreton, West Moreton, Ipswich and Leichhardt.)

== Election results ==
=== Argyle ===
1859 New South Wales colonial election: Argyle Saturday 18 June
Candidate	Votes	%
Terence Murray (re-elected)	389	74.5
Richard Driver	133	25.5
Total formal votes	389	100.0
Informal votes	522	0.0
Turnout	522	39.6

=== Balranald ===
1859 New South Wales colonial election: Balranald Tuesday 5 July
Candidate	Votes	%
Augustus Morris (elected)	119	81.5
William Brodribb	27	18.5
Total formal votes	146	100.0
Informal votes	0	0.0
Turnout	146	37.4

=== Bathurst ===
1859 New South Wales colonial election: Bathurst Thursday 9 June
Candidate	Votes	%
John Clements (elected)	348	55.6
Henry Rotton (defeated)	278	44.4
Total formal votes	626	100.0
Informal votes	0	0.0
Turnout	626	68.9

=== The Bogan ===
1859 New South Wales colonial election: The Bogan Tuesday 5 July
Candidate	Votes	%
George Lord (re-elected)	116	95.9
Christopher McRae	5	4.1
Total formal votes	121	100.0
Informal votes	0	0.0
Turnout	181	18.7

=== Braidwood ===
1859 New South Wales colonial election: Braidwood Monday 20 June
Candidate	Votes	%
Frederick Cooper (elected)	223	67.2
Merion Moriarty	47	14.2
George Simpson	37	11.1
Stephen Richardson	25	7.5
Total formal votes	332	94.3
Informal votes	20	5.7
Turnout	352	69.0

=== Brisbane ===
1859 New South Wales colonial election: Brisbane Saturday 11 June
Candidate	Votes	%
John Richardson (re-elected)	unopposed	

=== The Burnett ===
1859 New South Wales colonial election: The Burnett Tuesday 5 July
Candidate	Votes	%
Gilbert Eliott (elected)	191	72.1
George Howard	74	27.9
Total formal votes	265	100.0
Informal votes	0	0.0
Turnout	265	40.1

=== Camden ===
1859 New South Wales colonial election: Camden Tuesday 28 June
Candidate	Votes	%
William Wild (re-elected 1)	674	40.7
Henry Oxley (elected 2)	511	30.8
John Morrice	473	28.5
Total formal votes	1,658	100.0
Informal votes	0	0.0
Turnout	1,064	61.3

=== Canterbury ===
1859 New South Wales colonial election: Canterbury Saturday 18 June
Candidate	Votes	%
Edward Flood (re-elected 1)	619	25.3
Samuel Lyons (elected 2)	538	22.0
John Lucas	497	20.3
Samuel Terry	352	14.4
William Windeyer	329	13.5
Maurice Reynolds	112	4.6
Total formal votes	2,447	100.0
Informal votes	0	0.0
Turnout	1,560	51.5

=== Carcoar ===
1859 New South Wales colonial election: Carcoar Tuesday 21 June
Candidate	Votes	%
William Watt (elected)	unopposed	

=== The Clarence ===
1859 New South Wales colonial election: The Clarence Tuesday 21 June
Candidate	Votes	%
Clark Irving (elected)	228	45.5
Alexander MacKellar	152	30.3
Edward Ryan	121	24.2
Total formal votes	501	100.0
Informal votes	0	0.0
Turnout	501	53.4

=== Central Cumberland ===
1859 New South Wales colonial election: Central Cumberland Thursday 23 June
Candidate	Votes	%
James Atkinson (elected 1)	389	35.1
John Laycock (elected 2)	358	32.3
John Lackey	343	30.9
John Beit	20	1.8
Total formal votes	1,110	100.0
Informal votes	0	0.0
Turnout	1,110	32.8

=== Darling Downs ===
1859 New South Wales colonial election: Darling Downs Tuesday 5 July
Candidate	Votes	%
John Douglas (elected 1)	383	33.7
William Handcock (elected 2)	377	33.2
John McLean	375	33.0
Total formal votes	1,135	100.0
Informal votes	0	0.0
Turnout	1,135	35.7

=== East Macquarie ===
1859 New South Wales colonial election: East Macquarie Monday 13 June
Candidate	Votes	%
William Cummings (elected 1)	415	28.1
William Suttor (re-elected 2)	394	26.7
Charles McPhillamy	370	25.1
Charles Whalan	298	20.2
Total formal votes	1,477	100.0
Informal votes	0	0.0
Turnout	1,477	55.9

=== East Maitland ===
1859 New South Wales colonial election: East Maitland Saturday 18 June
Candidate	Votes	%
Joseph Chambers (elected)	210	61.6
James Dickson (defeated)	131	38.4
Total formal votes	341	100.0
Informal votes	0	0.0
Turnout	341	61.2

=== East Moreton ===
1859 New South Wales colonial election: East Moreton Saturday 18 June
Candidate	Votes	%
Robert Cribb (elected)	178	60.8
William Tooth	115	39.3
Total formal votes	115	100.0
Informal votes	293	0.0
Turnout	293	46.5

=== East Sydney ===
1859 New South Wales colonial election: East Sydney Thursday 9 June
Candidate	Votes	%
Charles Cowper (re-elected 1)	2,064	20.0
John Black (elected 2)	1,682	16.3
Henry Parkes (elected 3)	1,654	16.0
James Martin (re-elected 4)	1,349	13.1
Charles Kemp	1,317	12.7
Richard Driver	1,201	11.6
William Allen	569	5.5
William Wentworth	300	2.9
William Benbow	205	2.0
Total formal votes	10,341	100.0
Informal votes	0	0.0
Turnout	3,436	45.4

=== Eden ===
1859 New South Wales colonial election: Eden Thursday 23 June
Candidate	Votes	%
Daniel Egan (elected)	337	55.6
Henry Clarke	269	44.4
Total formal votes	606	100.0
Informal votes	0	0.0
Turnout	605	78.7

Daniel Egan was defeated as the sitting member for Monara.

=== The Glebe ===
1859 New South Wales colonial election: The Glebe Wednesday 15 June
Candidate	Votes	%
John Campbell (re-elected)	475	52.8
Ewen Cameron	424	47.2
Total formal votes	899	100.0
Informal votes	0	0.0
Turnout	899	56.8

=== Goldfields North ===
1859 New South Wales colonial election: Goldfields North Wednesday 6 July
Candidate	Votes	%
James Hoskins (elected)	122	56.2
James Macnamara	90	41.5
Edward Hargraves	5	2.3
Total formal votes	217	100.0
Informal votes	0	0.0
Turnout	222	9.3

=== Goldfields South ===
1859 New South Wales colonial election: Goldfields South Wednesday 6 July
Candidate	Votes	%
Bowie Wilson (elected)	374	73.9
John Egan	132	26.1
Total formal votes	506	100.0
Informal votes	0	0.0
Turnout	506	N/A

=== Goldfields West ===
1859 New South Wales colonial election: Goldfields West Monday 13 June
Candidate	Votes	%
Robert Wisdom (elected)	show of hands	
William Redman		

=== Goulburn ===
1859 New South Wales colonial election: Goulburn Tuesday 14 June
Candidate	Votes	%
William Roberts (elected)	198	57.9
Richard Driver	144	42.1
Total formal votes	342	100.0
Informal votes	0	0.0
Turnout	342	68.3

=== The Gwydir ===
1859 New South Wales colonial election: The Gwydir Thursday 7 July
Candidate	Votes	%
Richard Jenkins (re-elected)	unopposed	

=== Hartley ===
1859 New South Wales colonial election: Hartley Saturday 25 June
Candidate	Votes	%
Henry Rotton (elected)	281	57.8
Ryan Brenan	205	42.2
Total formal votes	486	100.0
Informal votes	0	0.0
Turnout	486	59.5

=== The Hastings ===
1859 New South Wales colonial election: The Hastings Friday 1 July
Candidate	Votes	%
Henry Flett (elected)	321	40.8
J Andrews	278	35.4
Frederick Panton	186	23.7
James McCarthy	1	0.1
Total formal votes	786	100.0
Informal votes	0	0.0
Turnout	786	56.3

=== The Hawkesbury ===
1859 New South Wales colonial election: The Hawkesbury Saturday 25 June
Candidate	Votes	%
William Piddington (re-elected)	unopposed	
John Darvall (elected)	unopposed	

=== The Hume ===
1859 New South Wales colonial election: The Hume Tuesday 28 June
Candidate	Votes	%
Morris Asher (elected)	175	41.4
Thomas Mate	172	40.7
J Badham	73	17.3
Eugene Owen	3	0.7
Total formal votes	423	100.0
Informal votes	0	0.0
Turnout	423	45.7

=== The Hunter ===
1859 New South Wales colonial election: The Hunter Saturday 25 June
Candidate	Votes	%
Richard Jones (re-elected)	431	60.7
Daniel Deniehy	279	39.3
Total formal votes	710	100.0
Informal votes	0	0.0
Turnout	710	58.1

=== Illawarra ===
1859 New South Wales colonial election: Illawarra Wednesday 15 June
Candidate	Votes	%
John Hargrave (re-elected)	629	61.4
Francis McCabe	396	38.6
Total formal votes	1,025	100.0
Informal votes	0	0.0
Turnout	1,025	77.9

John Hargrave was a member for East Camden.

=== Ipswich ===
1859 New South Wales colonial election: Ipswich Tuesday 14 June
Candidate	Votes	%
Arthur Macalister (elected)	236	51.1
Benjamin Cribb (defeated)	226	48.9
Total formal votes	462	98.7
Informal votes	6	1.3
Turnout	468	55.7

=== Kiama ===
1859 New South Wales colonial election: Kiama Thursday 16 June
Candidate	Votes	%
Samuel Gray (elected)	482	70.4
George Grey	201	29.3
Francis Carberry	2	0.3
Total formal votes	685	100.0
Informal votes	0	0.0
Turnout	735	65.6

=== The Lachlan ===
1859 New South Wales colonial election: The Lachlan Friday 24 June
Candidate	Votes	%
John Ryan (elected)	unopposed	

=== Leichhardt ===
1859 New South Wales colonial election: Leichhardt Wednesday 6 July
Candidate	Votes	%
William Walsh (elected)	unopposed	

=== Liverpool Plains ===
1859 New South Wales colonial election: Liverpool Plains Tuesday 5 July
Candidate	Votes	%
Andrew Loder (elected)	380	71.6
Francis Rusden	151	28.4
Total formal votes	531	100.0
Informal votes	0	0.0
Turnout	534	45.3

=== The Lower Hunter ===
1859 New South Wales colonial election: The Lower Hunter Wednesday 29 June
Candidate	Votes	%
William Windeyer (elected)	316	72.6
James Williamson	119	27.4
Total formal votes	435	100.0
Informal votes	0	0.0
Turnout	435	64.1

=== Monara ===
1859 New South Wales colonial election: Monara Thursday 30 June
Candidate	Votes	%
Alexander Hamilton (elected)	311	72.5
Daniel Egan (defeated)	118	27.5
Total formal votes	429	100.0
Informal votes	0	0.0
Turnout	429	45.7

Daniel Egan was elected for Eden.

=== Morpeth ===
1859 New South Wales colonial election: Morpeth Friday 24 June
Candidate	Votes	%
Edward Close (elected)	280	54.8
Samuel Gordon	231	45.2
Total formal votes	231	100.0
Informal votes	511	0.0
Turnout	511	68.2

=== Mudgee ===
1859 New South Wales colonial election: Mudgee Saturday 18 June
Candidate	Votes	%
Lyttleton Bayley (elected)	524	68.8
Robert Lowe	238	31.2
Total formal votes	762	100.0
Informal votes	0	0.0
Turnout	762	37.8

=== The Murray ===
1859 New South Wales colonial election: The Murray Wednesday 29 June
Candidate	Votes	%
John Hay (re-elected)	unopposed	

=== The Murrumbidgee ===
1859 New South Wales colonial election: The Murrumbidgee Friday 17 June
Candidate	Votes	%
William Macleay (re-elected)	unopposed	

=== Narellan ===
1859 New South Wales colonial election: Narellan Monday 27 June
Candidate	Votes	%
John Hurley (elected)	311	61.0
John Oxley	199	39.0
Total formal votes	510	100.0
Informal votes	0	0.0
Turnout	510	73.0

=== The Nepean ===
1859 New South Wales colonial election: The Nepean Thursday 16 June
Candidate	Votes	%
Robert Jamison (re-elected)	unopposed	

=== New England ===
1859 New South Wales colonial election: New England Thursday 30 June
Candidate	Votes	%
James Hart (re-elected)	313	49.8
Thomas Rusden	311	49.5
James Eames	4	0.6
Total formal votes	628	99.8
Informal votes	2	0.2
Turnout	630	56.0

Four people were charged with impersonating electors and a petition was lodged against the election. The Elections and Qualifications Committee conducted a re-count.

1859 New South Wales colonial election: New England Re-count
Candidate	Votes	%
James Hart (re-elected)	310	50.1
Thomas Rusden	307	49.6
John Eames	2	0.3
Total formal votes	619	99.6
Informal votes	5	0.4
Turnout	624	55.5

=== Newcastle ===
1859 New South Wales colonial election: Newcastle Tuesday 14 June
Candidate	Votes	%
Arthur Hodgson (re-elected)	309	51.8
James Hannell	288	48.2
Total formal votes	597	100.0
Informal votes	0	0.0
Turnout	597	68.9

=== Newtown ===
1859 New South Wales colonial election: Newtown Friday 17 June
Candidate	Votes	%
Alexander McArthur (elected)	354	37.5
Stephen Brown	222	23.5
Edward Hill	219	23.2
Thomas Holt	149	15.8
Total formal votes	944	100.0
Informal votes	0	0.0
Turnout	944	63.3

=== Northumberland ===
1859 New South Wales colonial election: Northumberland Friday 17 June
Candidate	Votes	%
Alexander Scott (re-elected)	unopposed	

=== Orange ===
1859 New South Wales colonial election: Orange Saturday 18 June
Candidate	Votes	%
Saul Samuel (elected)	162	62.6
John Suttor	97	37.5
Total formal votes	97	100.0
Informal votes	259	0.0
Turnout	259	62.0

=== Paddington ===
1859 New South Wales colonial election: Paddington Friday 10 June
Candidate	Votes	%
Daniel Cooper (re-elected)	528	52.0
William Windeyer	487	48.0
Total formal votes	1,015	100.0
Informal votes	0	0.0
Turnout	1,015	58.4

=== Parramatta ===
1859 New South Wales colonial election: Parramatta Saturday 18 June
Candidate	Votes	%
James Byrnes (re-elected 1)	380	37.7
George Oakes (re-elected 2)	352	34.9
Arthur Holroyd	277	27.5
Total formal votes	1,009	100.0
Informal votes	0	0.0
Turnout	690	57.1

=== The Paterson ===
1859 New South Wales colonial election: The Paterson Thursday 16 June
Candidate	Votes	%
William Arnold (re-elected)	159	70.4
Henry Dangar	62	27.4
William Bucknell	5	2.2
Total formal votes	226	100.0
Informal votes	0	0.0
Turnout	223	54.3

=== Patrick's Plains ===
1859 New South Wales colonial election: Patrick's Plains Thursday 30 June
Candidate	Votes	%
William Russell (elected)	264	57.4
James Dickson	196	42.6
Total formal votes	460	100.0
Informal votes	0	0.0
Turnout	460	53.3

=== Queanbeyan ===
1859 New South Wales colonial election: Queanbeyan Tuesday 21 June
Candidate	Votes	%
William Forster (re-elected)	unopposed	

=== Shoalhaven ===
1859 New South Wales colonial election: Shoalhaven Tuesday 21 June
Candidate	Votes	%
John Garrett (elected)	281	41.6
Charles Blakeney	222	32.8
Alexander Campbell	156	23.1
George Alley	17	2.5
Total formal votes	676	100.0
Informal votes	0	0.0
Turnout	676	73.8

=== St Leonards ===
1859 New South Wales colonial election: St Leonards Friday 17 June
Candidate	Votes	%
Edward Sayers (elected)	389	47.3
Isaac Shepherd	319	38.8
James Farnell	115	14.0
Total formal votes	823	100.0
Informal votes	0	0.0
Turnout	823	55.8

=== Tenterfield ===
1859 New South Wales colonial election: Tenterfield Friday 24 June
Candidate	Votes	%
Randolph Nott (elected)	99	55.3
Robert Meston	80	44.7
Total formal votes	179	100.0
Informal votes	0	0.0
Turnout	179	32.8

=== The Tumut ===
1859 New South Wales colonial election: The Tumut Thursday 30 June
Candidate	Votes	%
George Lang (elected)	259	53.3
John Egan	178	36.6
James Garland	49	10.1
Total formal votes	486	100.0
Informal votes	0	0.0
Turnout	486	62.5

=== The Upper Hunter ===
1859 New South Wales colonial election: The Upper Hunter Friday 24 June
Candidate	Votes	%
John Robertson (re-elected)	356	73.6
Thomas Dangar	112	23.1
Daniel Deniehy	16	3.3
Total formal votes	484	100.0
Informal votes	0	0.0
Turnout	484	47.1

=== Wellington ===
1859 New South Wales colonial election: Wellington Wednesday 15 June
Candidate	Votes	%
Nicolas Hyeronimus (elected)	100	52.9
Arthur Holroyd	89	47.1
Total formal votes	189	100.0
Informal votes	0	0.0
Turnout	189	29.2

=== West Macquarie ===
1859 New South Wales colonial election: West Macquarie Tuesday 14 June
Candidate	Votes	%
John McPhillamy (elected)	264	83.0
Thomas Hawkins	54	17.0
Total formal votes	318	100.0
Informal votes	0	0.0
Turnout	318	60.9

=== West Maitland ===
1859 New South Wales colonial election: West Maitland Tuesday 21 June
Candidate	Votes	%
Elias Weekes (re-elected)	unopposed	

=== West Moreton ===
1859 New South Wales colonial election: West Moreton Tuesday 21 June
Candidate	Votes	%
Henry Mort (elected)	245	70.4
Henry Challinor	103	29.6
Total formal votes	245	100.0
Informal votes	348	0.0
Turnout	348	49.0

=== West Sydney ===
1859 New South Wales colonial election: West Sydney Tuesday 14 June
Candidate	Votes	%
John Lang (elected 1)	2,148	19.7
James Pemell (elected 2)	1,957	17.9
Thomas Broughton (elected 3)	1,799	16.5
John Plunkett (re-elected 4)	1,744	16.0
Robert Stewart	1,668	15.3
Daniel Deniehy (defeated)	1,450	13.3
Thomas Duigan	143	1.3
Total formal votes	10,909	100.0
Informal votes	0	0.0
Turnout	3,661	57.0

=== The Williams ===
1859 New South Wales colonial election: The Williams Thursday 16 June
Candidate	Votes	%
Stephen Dark (elected)	324	58.4
Samuel Gordon (defeated)	231	41.6
Total formal votes	555	100.0
Informal votes	0	0.0
Turnout	555	64.8

Samuel Gordon was the member for the abolished district of Durham.

=== Windsor ===
1859 New South Wales colonial election: Windsor Tuesday 21 June
Candidate	Votes	%
William Dalley (re-elected)	276	66.2
Robert Ross	141	33.8
Total formal votes	417	100.0
Informal votes	0	0.0
Turnout	417	66.6

=== Wollombi ===
1859 New South Wales colonial election: Wollombi Monday 20 June
Candidate	Votes	%
William Cape (elected)	unopposed	

=== Yass Plains ===
1859 New South Wales colonial election: Yass Plains Friday 24 June
Candidate	Votes	%
Thomas Laidlaw (elected)	unopposed	

== See also ==
- Candidates of the 1859 New South Wales colonial election
- Members of the New South Wales Legislative Assembly, 1859–1860
