= 1857 Moreton, Wide Bay, Burnett, Maranoa, Leichhardt and Port Curtis colonial by-election =

By-election in New South Wales, Australia

A by-election was held for the New South Wales Legislative Assembly electorate of Moreton, Wide Bay, Burnett, Maranoa, Leichhardt and Port Curtis on 19 November 1857 because Gordon Sandeman resigned to concentrate on his business interests.

== Dates ==
Date	Event
10 October 1857	Gordon Sandeman resigned.
22 October 1857	Writ of election issued by the Speaker of the Legislative Assembly.
19 November 1857	Nominations at Ipswich.
17 December 1857	Polling day
14 January 1857	Return of writ

== Result ==
1857 Moreton, Wide Bay, Burnett, Maranoa, Leichhardt and Port Curtis by-election 19 November
Candidate	Votes	%
Patrick Leslie	unopposed	

== See also ==
- Electoral results for the district of Moreton, Wide Bay, Burnett, Maranoa, Leichhardt and Port Curtis
- List of New South Wales state by-elections
