= Electoral results for the district of Moreton, Wide Bay, Burnett and Maranoa =

Results for Australian district

The United pastoral districts of Moreton, Wide Bay, Burnett and Maranoa and from 1857 Moreton, Wide Bay, Burnett, Maranoa, Leichhardt and Port Curtis, an electoral district of the Legislative Assembly in the Colony of New South Wales was created in 1856 and abolished in 1858.

Election	Member	Party
Moreton, Wide Bay, Burnett and Maranoa
1856	Gordon Sandeman	None
Moreton, Wide Bay, Burnett, Maranoa, Leichhardt and Port Curtis
1857 by	Patrick Leslie	None
1858	William Tooth	None

== Election results ==
=== 1858 ===
1858 New South Wales colonial election: Moreton, Wide Bay, Burnett, Maranoa, Leichhardt and Port Curtis 12 February
Candidate	Votes	%
William Tooth (elected)	56	51.9
Arthur Macalister	52	48.2
Total formal votes	108	100.0
Informal votes	0	0.0
Turnout	108	39.3

The sitting member Patrick Leslie did not contest the election. The returning officer stated that the lack of a mail service to northern parts of the district, being Gladstone, Rannes and Surat meant that no polling had occurred in those places. The Legislative Assembly directed him to return the writ. William Tooth was subsequently proclaimed to have been elected, and Tooth was sworn in on 22 June 1858.

=== 1857 by-election ===
1857 Moreton, Wide Bay, Burnett, Maranoa, Leichhardt and Port Curtis by-election 19 November
Candidate	Votes	%
Patrick Leslie	unopposed	

Gordon Sandeman resigned.

=== 1856 ===
1856 New South Wales colonial election: Moreton, Wide Bay, Burnett and Maranoa
Candidate	Votes	%
Gordon Sandeman (elected)	unopposed	

Polling was scheduled to be conducted on 17 April 1856. Sitting Legislative Councillor for Pastoral Districts of Moreton, Wide Bay, Burnett, and Maranoa was Richard Joseph Smith who did not contest the election.
