= Electoral district of Moreton, Wide Bay, Burnett and Maranoa =

Former state electoral district of New South Wales, Australia

Moreton, Wide Bay, Burnett and Maranoa New South Wales—Legislative Assembly
- State: New South Wales
- Created: 1856
- Abolished: 1859

The United pastoral districts of Moreton, Wide Bay, Burnett and Maranoa, and from 1857 Moreton, Wide Bay, Burnett, Maranoa, Leichhardt and Port Curtis, was an electoral district of the Legislative Assembly in the Australian state of New South Wales created in 1856 and consisted of the pastoral districts around the early settlements of Moreton Bay; Wide Bay, near Maryborough; the Burnett River, near Bundaberg; and the Maranoa region of South-western Queensland. In September 1856 the pastoral districts around the Leichhardt River in the Gulf of Carpentaria region and Port Curtis (Gladstone) were added to the electorate. The district was abolished for the 1859 election and replaced by the separate districts of East Moreton, West Moreton, Burnett (which included Wide Bay) and Leichhardt (which included Port Curtis), while Maranoa became part of Darling Downs. All of these districts became part of Queensland when it was established as a separate colony in late 1859.

== Members ==
Moreton, Wide Bay, Burnett and Maranoa
Member	Party	Term
Gordon Sandeman	None	1856–1857
Moreton, Wide Bay, Burnett, Maranoa, Leichhardt and Port Curtis
Patrick Leslie	None	1857–1858
William Tooth	None	1858–1859

== Election results ==
1858 New South Wales colonial election: Moreton, Wide Bay, Burnett, Maranoa, Leichhardt and Port Curtis 12 February
Candidate	Votes	%
William Tooth (elected)	56	51.9
Arthur Macalister	52	48.2
Total formal votes	108	100.0
Informal votes	0	0.0
Turnout	108	39.3

The sitting member Patrick Leslie did not contest the election. The returning officer stated that the lack of a mail service to northern parts of the district, being Gladstone, Rannes and Surat meant that no polling had occurred in those places. The Legislative Assembly directed him to return the writ. William Tooth was subsequently proclaimed to have been elected, and Tooth was sworn in on 22 June 1858.
