= Warwick War Memorial =

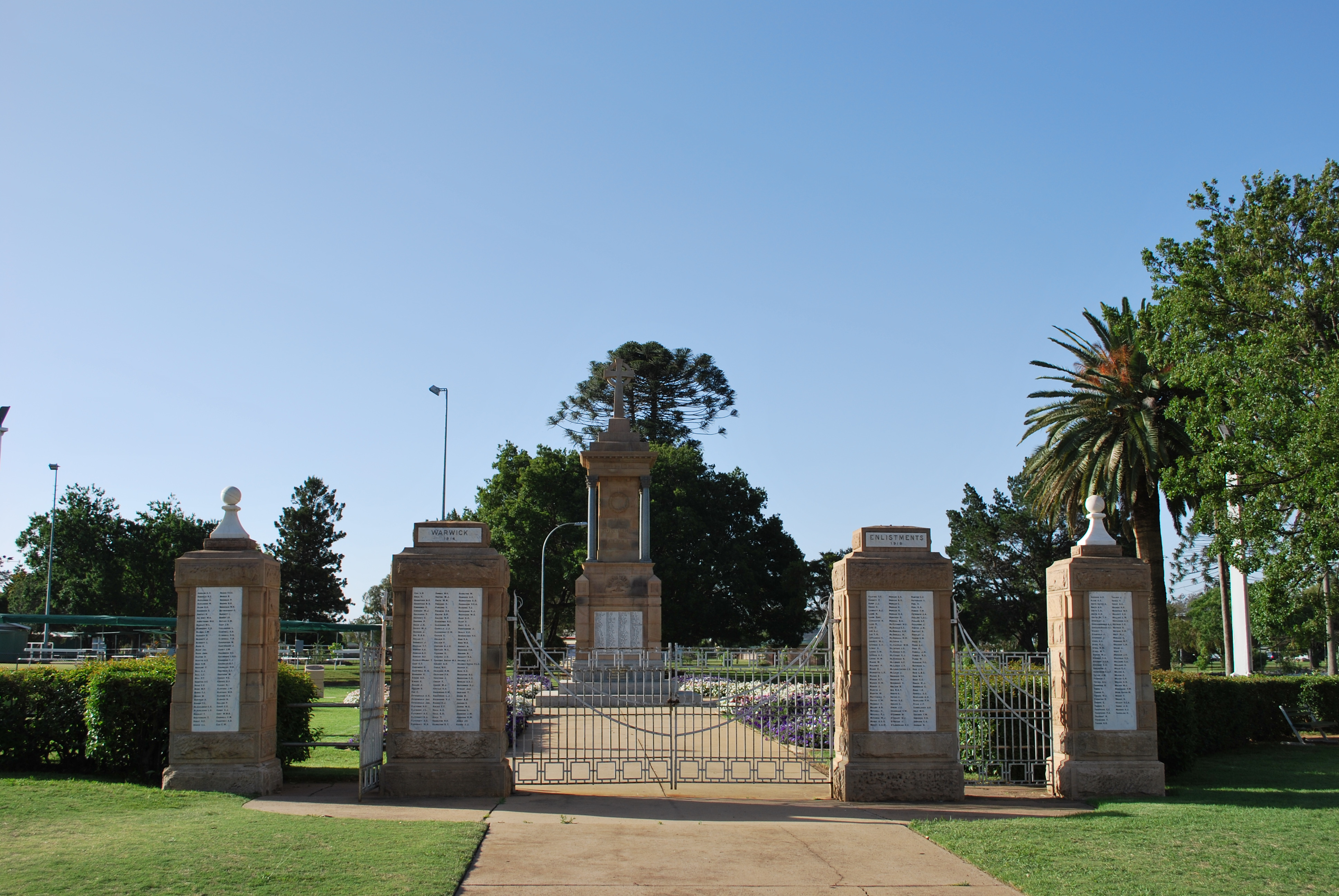
- Warwick War Memorial, 2008

- Location within Queensland Location within Australia
- 28.2129°S 152.032°E
- Location: Fitzroy Street, Warwick, Southern Downs Region, Queensland, Australia

History
- Design period: 1919–1930s (interwar period)
- Built: 1923–1924

Queensland Heritage Register
- Official name: Warwick War Memorial and Gates
- Type: state heritage (landscape, built)
- Designated: 21 October 1992
- Reference no.: 600946
- Significant period: 1923, 1924 (social); 1923, 1924 (historical, fabric)
- Significant components: memorial – gate/s, park / green space, memorial – war
- Builders: F Williams and Company

Warwick War Memorial and Gates is a heritage-listed memorial at Fitzroy Street, Warwick, Southern Downs Region, Queensland, Australia. It was built from 1923 to 1924. It was added to the Queensland Heritage Register on 21 October 1992.

== History ==
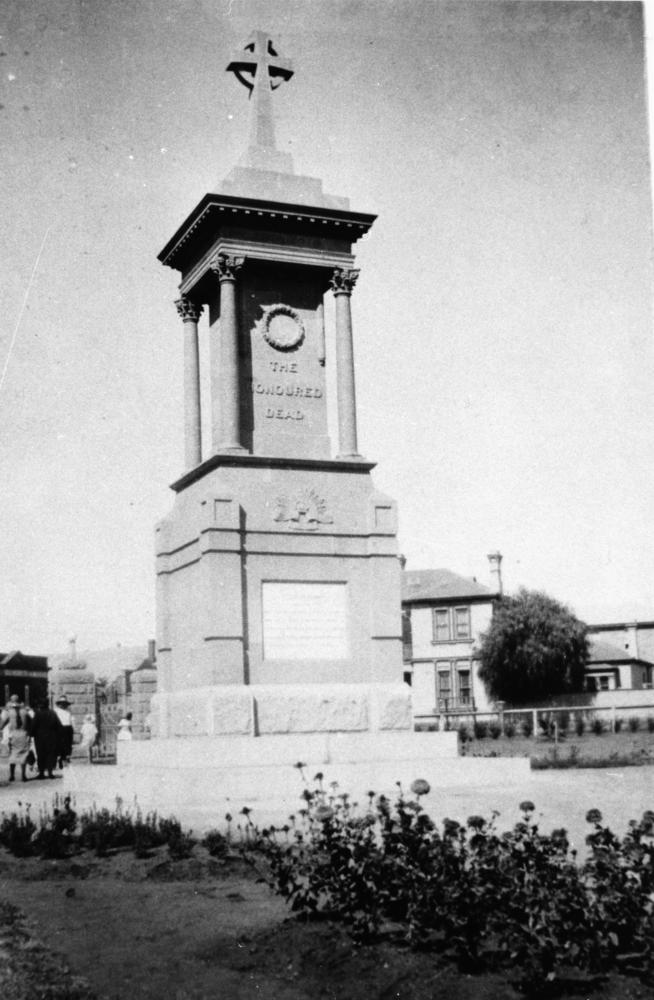
Warwick War Memorial, circa 1920

The Warwick War Memorial was constructed in 1923 and the gates were completed one year later in 1924. It is thought to be designed by Roy and Hugh Campbell and executed by Frank Williams. The memorial honours the 122 local men who fell during the First World War and the gates honour the 377 who served and returned. The memorial is situated on the south-eastern corner of Leslie Park, which has been a recreational square and park for the town since the first surveys in the late 1840s.

Warwick was established as an administrative centre of the emerging Darling Downs regions in 1847, with a post office being established in the town in 1848. This year saw the first survey work of the embryonic town completed by surveyor, James Charles Burnett, with further surveys in 1850, and the first sale of crown land in July 1850.

These early surveys of Warwick saw land in the central part of town reserved for use as a public square and bounded by Victoria, Guy, Fitzroy and Palmerin Streets and intersected by Albert Street. These two blocks are now known as Leslie Park, in which the War Memorial is situated and Cunningham Park, which is on the block to the north of this.

By 1867 the Warwick Argus reports that the Recreation Square presents a very neat appearance, having been surrounded by a wire fence. A description in this report indicates that the square is in two sections, that to the north and south of Albert Street, which is described as a carriage road, and that these two sections are surrounded by the timber and iron fences with entrances at each corner of both sections. From the report it is understood that the square was set aside for healthy and invigorating recreation, and that the provision of such a reserve would ensure the development of Warwick as a desirable and fashionable resort.

The Recreation Square seems to have been subject to constant upgrading by the Local Council, who administered both this and the Reserve for Public Park, an allotment of 52 acres to the north east of the town, known as Queen's Park. In 1869 tenders were called in the Warwick Examiner and Times for the erection of two large and eight small gates to the Square.

As a result of the Crown Land's Alienation Act of 1868, which required that public notice be given of Crown Land which was to be permanently reserved from public, four Reserves were set aside in Warwick in 1869. One of the four reserves was this Recreation Square which then became officially gazetted as such.

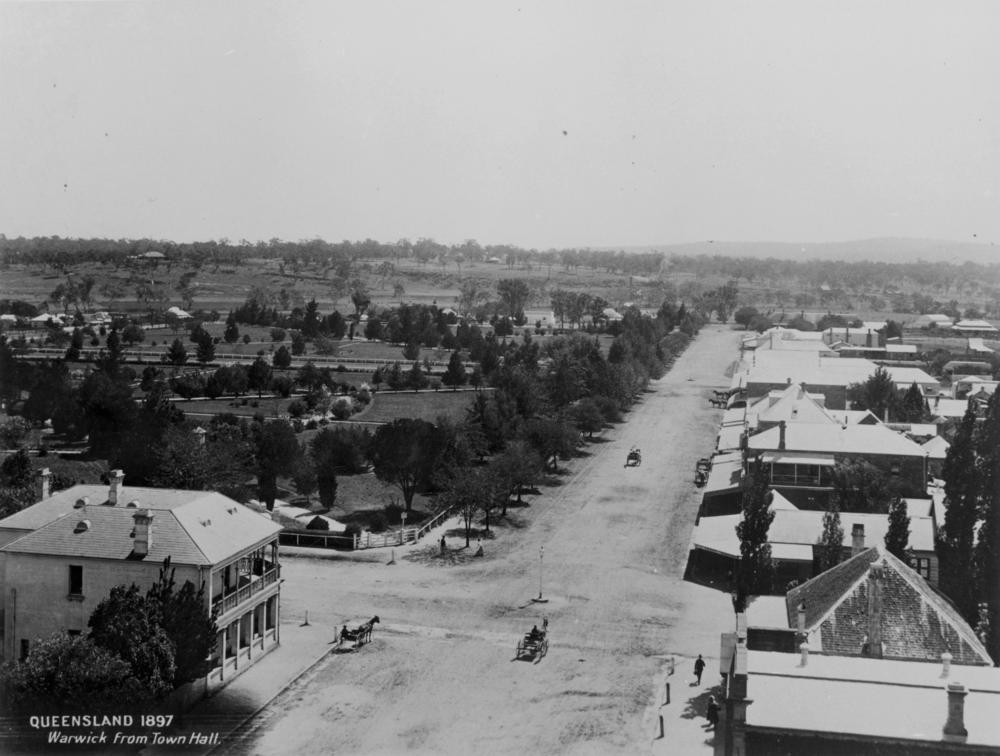
View of Leslie Park from the Warwick Town Hall, 1897

Improvements continued in the Square, with the aid and advice of Director of the Brisbane Botanic Gardens, Walter Hill, who spent a great deal of time travelling to various squares and parks in Queensland and reporting upon their condition and improvements. In 1876, Hill visited Queen's Parks in Ipswich, Toowoomba and Warwick, and wrote extensive reports of both these and other parks and squares in these towns. By this stage the fence and gates on the Recreation Square are reported by Hill as substantial and suitable, with gates for pedestrians at each corner of the two sections of the Square, and paths from each gate crossing the square diagonally so as to afford great facilities to pedestrians. Walter Hill, at the request of the Mayor of Warwick, supplied many trees, which were firstly tended in a nearby garden and then transplanted in the square. Many established trees and park features are extant in Leslie Park today, including the diagonal paths mentioned by Hill in his report.

Among the alterations which have occurred in Leslie Park, so named to honour the Leslie family who were early pioneers of the Darling Downs, was the erection of the War Memorial and Memorial Gates. The foundation stone of the War Memorial was laid 7 June 1923 by the then Prime Minister of Australia, Hon Stanley Bruce and unveiled by the Queensland Governor, Sir Matthew Nathan, on 5 December 1923 at a ceremony attended by 3000 people. The memorial was erected to cherish and perpetuate the memory of the men of Warwick and district who were faithful unto death in the Empire's glorious struggle for righteousness and freedom.

The Memorial was constructed for £1445 of Helidon sandstone by the well known and highly regarded masonry firm of F Williams and Company of Ipswich.

It was reputedly designed by Roy Campbell of Warwick, although the designs may, in fact be those of his father, Hugh Campbell. Upon unveiling the Memorial, the Governor was said to have expressed pleasure in the involvement of a returned soldier in the work of the Memorial, and this is believed to refer to Roy Campbell who served in the war.

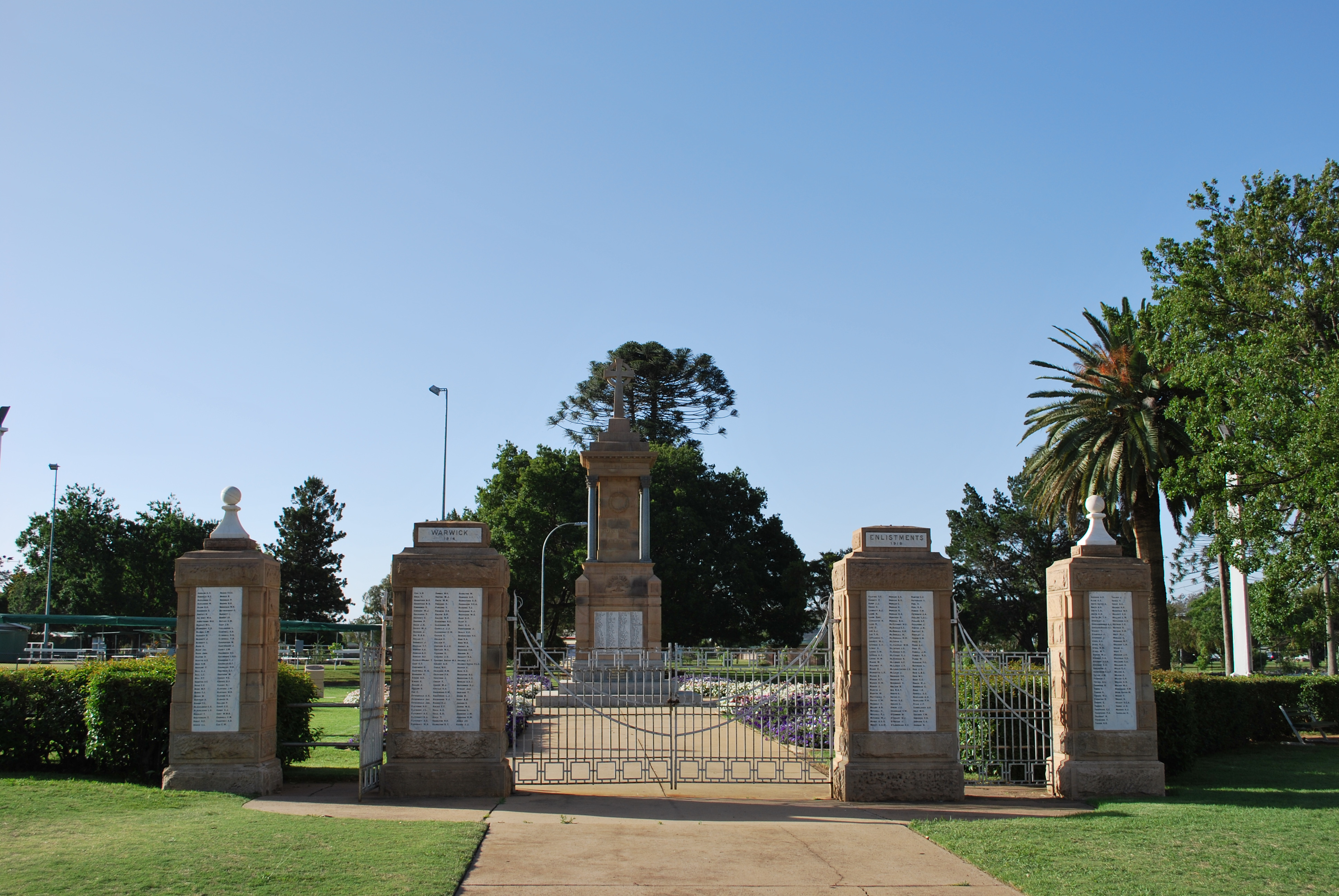
Warwick War Memorial beyond the Memorial Gates

The same designer and contractor were responsible for the Memorial Gates, which were erected one year later in 1924.

Since then other war memorials have been added to Leslie Park, adjacent to the gates, flanking the principal memorial; these include two cairns, one commemorating the Second World War and the other for various wars including those in Vietnam, Korea, Borneo and Malaya; as well as two war guns. As well, various buildings have been added to the park including a lawn bowls club and green, a kindergarten and playground and various council administration and storage buildings.

Australia, and Queensland in particular, had few civic monuments before the First World War. The memorials erected in its wake became our first national monuments, recording the devastating impact of the war on a young nation. Australia lost 60,000 from a population of about 4 million, representing one in five of those who served. No previous or subsequent war has made such an impact on the nation.

Even before the end of the war, memorials became a spontaneous and highly visible expression of national grief. To those who erected them, they were as sacred as grave sites, substitute graves for the Australians whose bodies lay in battlefield cemeteries in Europe and the Middle East. British policy decreed that the Empire war dead were to be buried where they fell. The word "cenotaph", commonly applied to war memorials at the time, literally means "empty tomb".

Australian war memorials are distinctive in that they commemorate not only the dead. Australians were proud that their first great national army, unlike other belligerent armies, was composed entirely of volunteers, men worthy of honour whether or not they made the supreme sacrifice. Many memorials honour all who served from a locality, not just the dead, providing valuable evidence of community involvement in the war. Such evidence is not readily obtainable from military records, or from state or national listings, where names are categorised alphabetically or by military unit.

Australian war memorials are also valuable evidence of imperial and national loyalties, at the time, not seen as conflicting; the skills of local stonemasons, metalworkers and architects; and of popular taste. In Queensland, the soldier statue was the popular choice of memorial, whereas the obelisk predominated in the southern states, possibly a reflection of Queensland's larger working-class population and a lesser involvement of architects.

Many of the First World War monuments have been updated to record local involvement in later conflicts, and some have fallen victim to unsympathetic re-location and repair.

== Description ==
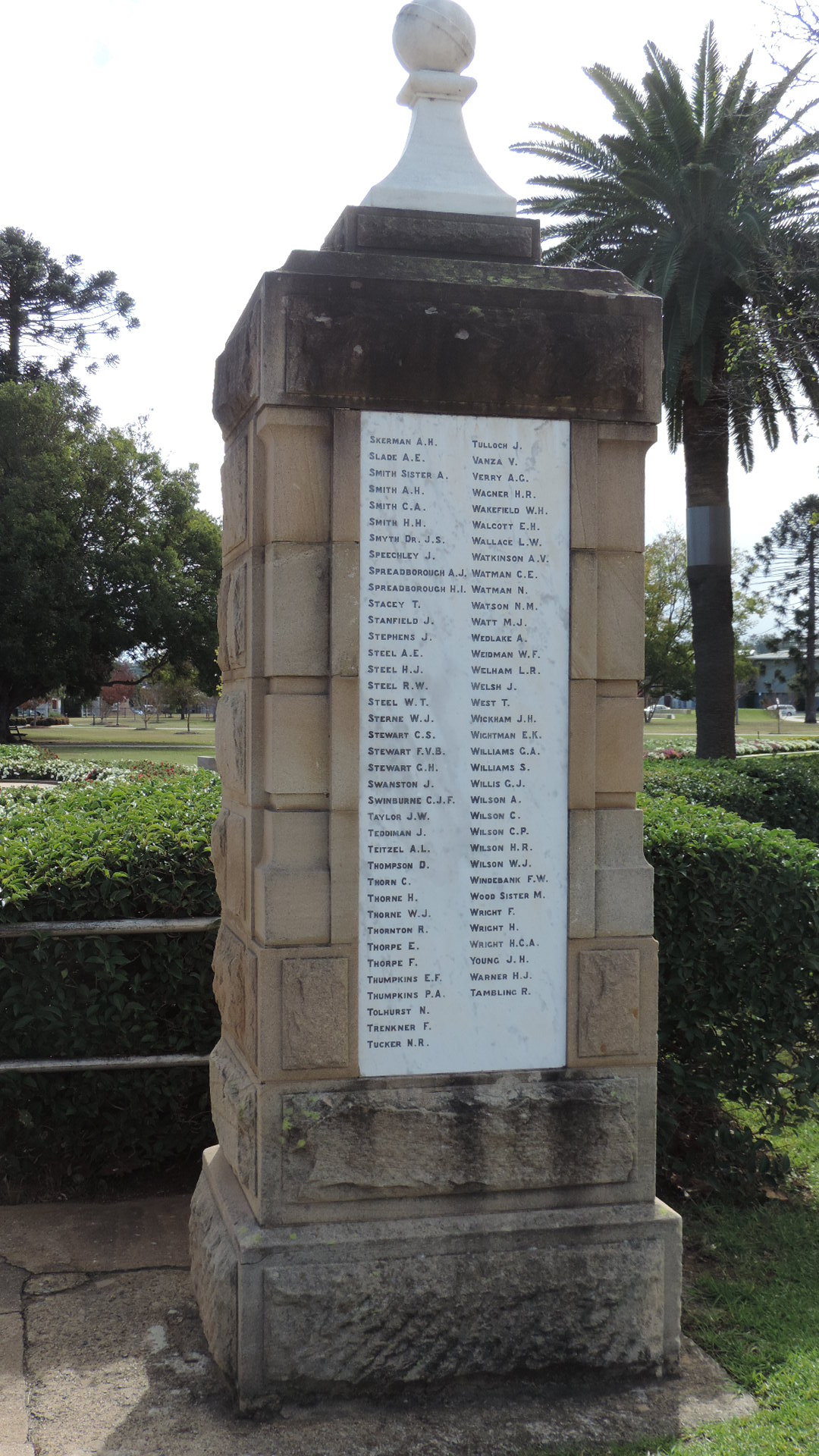
One of the four entrance gate posts, Warwick war memorial, 2015

The Warwick War Memorial is situated in the south eastern corner of Leslie Park, inside the Memorial Gates which address the corner of Fitzroy and Palmerin Street, Warwick.

The War Memorial is a substantial Helidon sandstone and granite structure facing the south eastern corner of Leslie Park, Warwick, where the Memorial Gates are diagonally situated. The memorial stands 35 feet (11 m) high, and comprises a base, pedestal and surmounting Celtic cross. The sandstone pedestal of the memorial sits on a stepped granite base, the upper step of which is rough cut and has a foundation stone on the south west face.

The banded sandstone plinth of the memorial has square planned piers projecting slightly from the corners which continue the decorative banding and are surmounted by pyramidal pinnacles. This section of the memorial features AIF badges, and a marble plaque, which in leaded lettering lists the 122 local soldiers who fell in the First World War. Resting on this section is the recessed sandstone shaft of the memorial, the entablature of which is supported at each corner on four polished granite columns with Corinthian capitals. The shaft has a carved wreath, carved lettering The Honoured Dead and Roman fasces on each corner. The entablature comprises a simply moulded architrave, a more elaborate cornice with dentils and a recessed frieze on which the dates 1914–1918 are carved in relief. Surmounting the entablature are three sandstone steps on which rest a carved sandstone Celtic cross.

The gates have four rough-cut coursed sandstone pillars, 2.9 metres (9 ft 6 in) high, the outer two of which are surmounted with marble globelike finials. Marble name plates with leaded lettering give lists of those from the district who fought in the First World War and returned. Iron swinging gates allow vehicular traffic between the inner piers and pedestrian traffic between these and the outer piers.

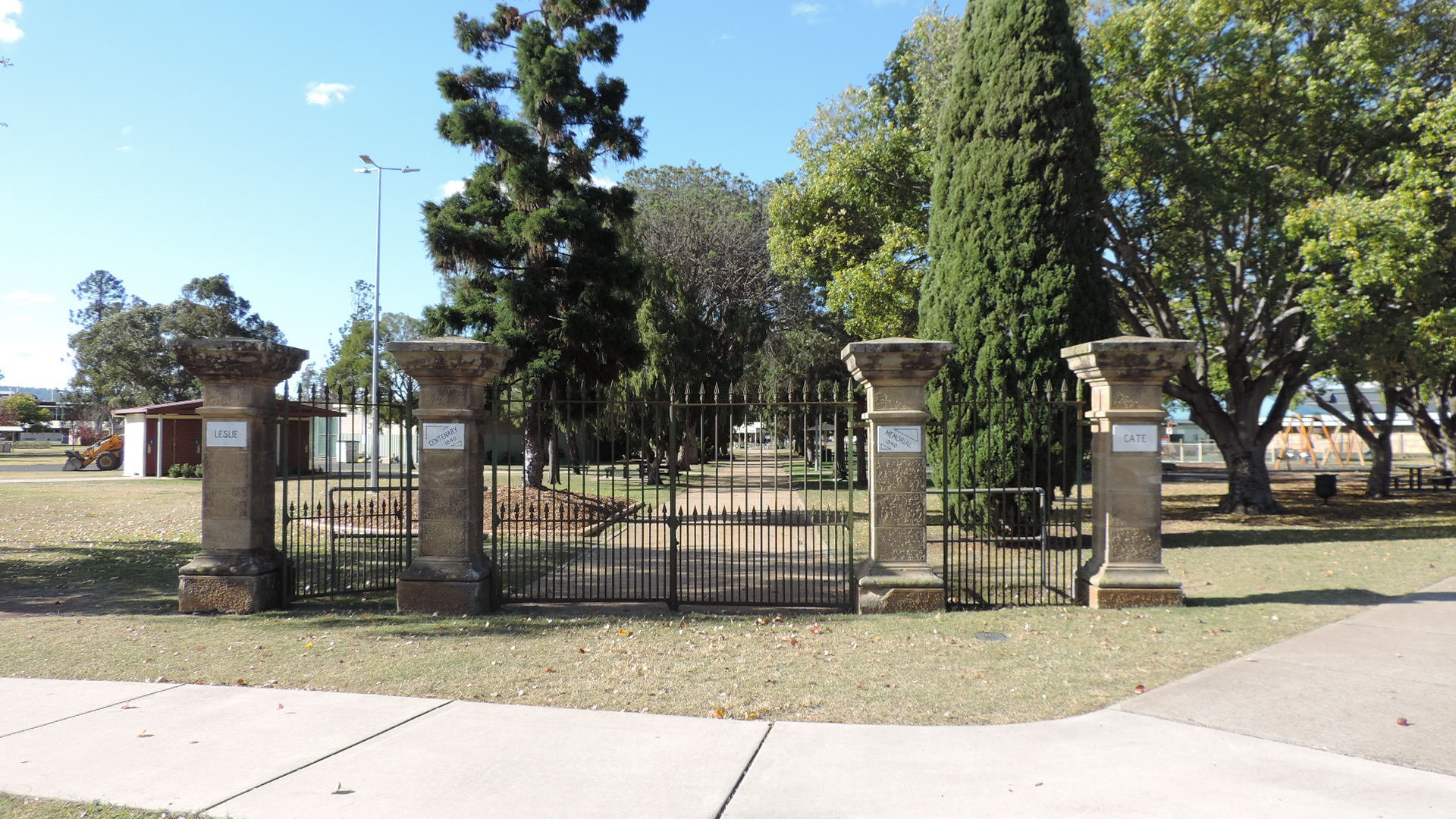
Leslie centenary memorial gates, 2015

Leslie Park has entrances on each corner, with gravelled paths from the entrances diagonally crossing the area. At the centre of the park, where the paths meet, is a rock and water feature, heavily built up with concrete block. The paths are lined with large established trees. The entrance on the corner of Fitzroy and Guy Streets features gates taken from Glengallan Homestead and re-used to celebrate the centenary of the Leslie brothers establishing Canning Downs pastoral run in 1840. The arrangement of the Leslie centenary gates was designed to be similar to the war memorial gates in appearance.

== Heritage listing ==
Warwick War Memorial and Gates was listed on the Queensland Heritage Register on 21 October 1992 having satisfied the following criteria.

The place is important in demonstrating the evolution or pattern of Queensland's history.

War Memorials are important in demonstrating the pattern of Queensland's history as they are representative of a recurrent theme that involved most communities throughout the state. They provide evidence of an era of widespread Australian patriotism and nationalism, particularly during and following the First World War.

Leslie Park is important in demonstrating the pattern of growth of the town of Warwick, as it was set aside as a square for public recreation in the initial surveys of the town, completed in the late 1840s.

The place demonstrates rare, uncommon or endangered aspects of Queensland's cultural heritage.

It is a rare example of a memorial still situated in its intact setting.

The place is important in demonstrating the principal characteristics of a particular class of cultural places.

The monuments manifest a unique documentary record and are demonstrative of popular taste in the inter-war period.

Erected in 1923, the war memorial and gates at Warwick demonstrate the principal characteristics of a commemorative structure erected as an enduring record of a major historical event. This is achieved through the setting and the appropriate use of various symbolic elements.

The place is important because of its aesthetic significance.

The memorial in its setting are a landmark within Warwick and contribute to the aesthetic qualities of the townscape.

The memorial and gates are of aesthetic significance for their high level of workmanship and design.

The place has a strong or special association with a particular community or cultural group for social, cultural or spiritual reasons.

The memorial has a strong and continuing association with the community as evidence of the impact of a major historic event and as the focal point for the remembrance of that event.

The place has a special association with the life or work of a particular person, group or organisation of importance in Queensland's history.

It also has special associations with architects Roy and Hugh Campbell, the local designers and F Williams and Company, a prominent Ipswich masonry firm.
