= Electoral district of Darling Downs =

Electoral district of Darling Downs may refer to any of three former electorates based in the Darling Downs region of Queensland:

- Division of Darling Downs, a former electorate of the Australian House of Representatives
- Electoral district of Darling Downs (New South Wales), a former electorate of the New South Wales Legislative Assembly
- Electoral district of Darling Downs (Queensland), a former electorate of the Queensland Legislative Assembly
