= Electoral district of Pastoral Districts of Clarence and Darling Downs =

Former legislative council electoral district of New South Wales, Australia

Pastoral Districts of Clarence and Darling Downs New South Wales—Legislative Council
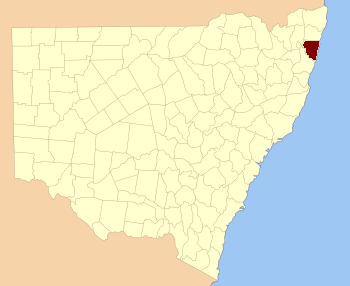
- Clarence County in modern New South Wales
- State: New South Wales
- Created: 1851
- Abolished: 1856
- Namesake: Clarence County & Darling Downs
- Coordinates: 29°S 152°E

The Electoral district of Pastoral Districts of Clarence and Darling Downs was an electorate of the New South Wales Legislative Council at a time when some of its members were elected and the balance were appointed by the Governor. It was a new electorate created in 1851 by the expansion of the Legislative Council to 54, 18 to be appointed and 36 elected. It included the Clarence Valley and the Darling Downs region, which became part of Queensland on its establishment in 1859.

In 1856 the unicameral Legislative Council was abolished and replaced with an elected Legislative Assembly and an appointed Legislative Council. The district was represented by the Legislative Assembly electorate of Clarence and Darling Downs.

== Members ==
Member	Term
George Farquhar Leslie	Sep 1851 – Feb 1855
Thomas Hood Hood	Apr 1855 – Feb 1856

== Election results ==
=== 1851 ===
1851 New South Wales colonial election, 22 September: Pastoral Districts of Clarence and Darling Downs
Candidate	Votes	%
George Leslie	unopposed	

=== 1855 ===
George Leslie resigned in February 1855.

Clarence and Darling Downs by-election 20 April 1855
Candidate	Votes	%
Thomas Hood	94	71.21
Gordon Sandeman	38	28.79
Total votes	132	100.00

== See also ==
- Members of the New South Wales Legislative Council, 1851-1856
