= Electoral district of West Moreton =

Electoral district of West Moreton may refer to:

- Electoral district of West Moreton (New South Wales), a former electorate of the New South Wales Legislative Assembly.
- Electoral district of West Moreton (Queensland), a former electorate of the Legislative Assembly of Queensland.
