= Electoral district of East Moreton =

Electoral district of East Moreton may refer to:

- Electoral district of East Moreton (New South Wales), a former electorate of the New South Wales Legislative Assembly.
- Electoral district of East Moreton (Queensland), a former electorate of the Queensland Legislative Assembly.
