= George Farquhar Leslie =

Australian politician (1820–1860)

Border of Queensland and New South Wales

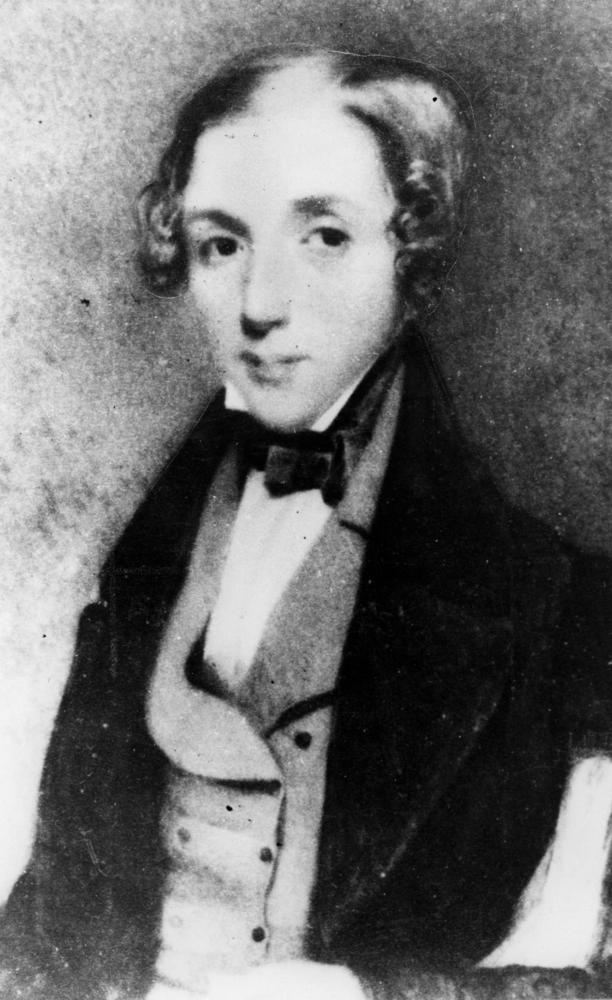
George Leslie, aged 18

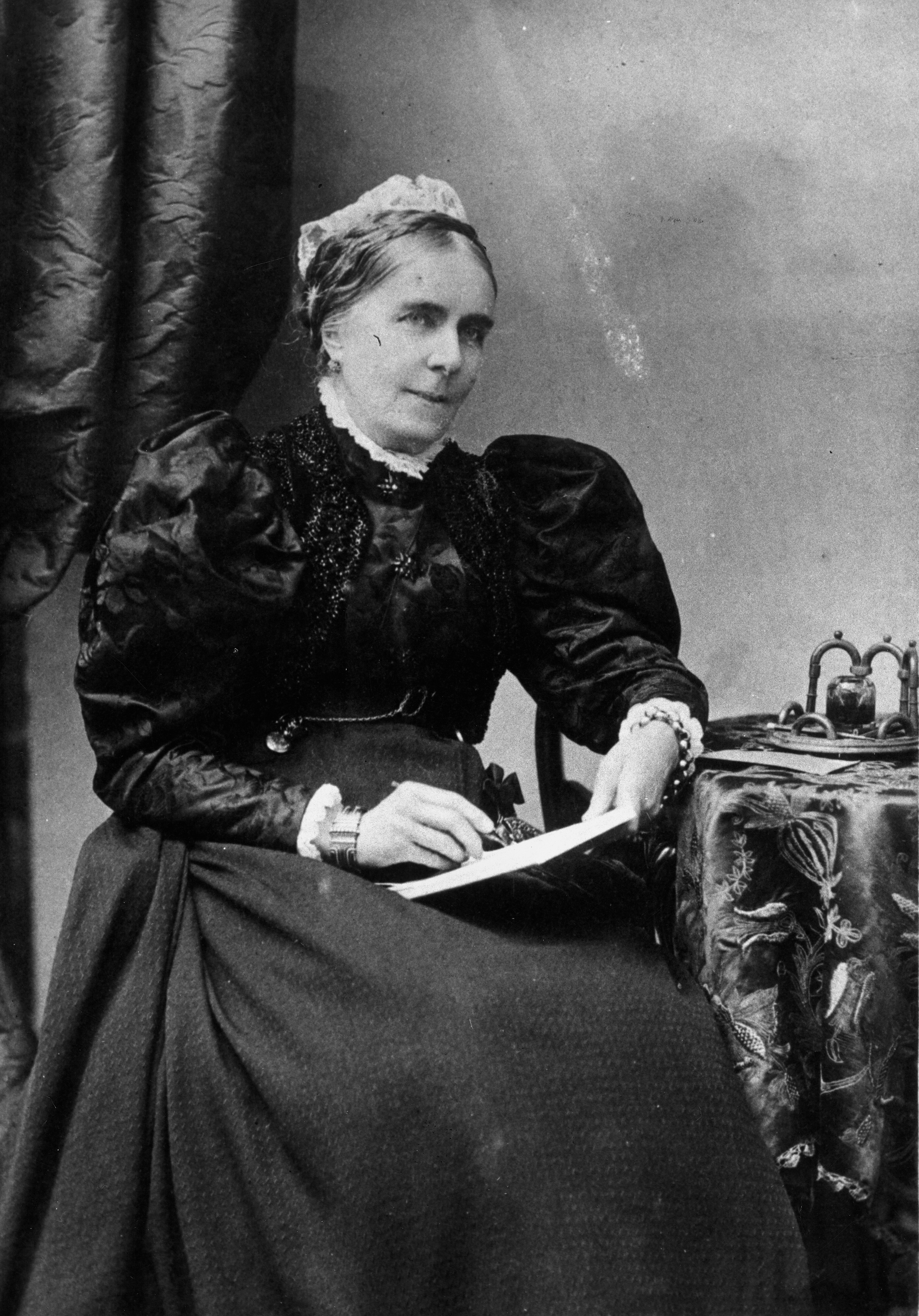
Madam Emmeline de Falbe (widow of George Leslie, née MacArthur), circa 1880

George Farquhar Leslie (19 August 1820 – 23 June 1860) was a Scottish-born pastoralist and politician in the colony of New South Wales, Australia.

== Early life ==
George Farquhar Leslie was born on 19 August 1820 at Rayne in Aberdeenshire, the son of William Leslie, the local laird, and Jane Davidson.

== New South Wales pastoralist ==
In 1838 he migrated to New South Wales, where he helped finance his brother Patrick's Darling Downs expedition. He managed sheep for Phillip Parker King, and then farmed land at the Darling Downs.

In 1840 his brother Patrick, married Catherine (Kate) Macarthur, daughter of Hannibal Macarthur (a Member of the New South Wales Legislative Council) and granddaughter of Philip Gidley King (former Governor of New South Wales). On 2 December 1847, George Leslie married Catherine's sister Emmeline Maria Macarthur at All Saints Church, Parramatta, New South Wales. The wedding of George and Emmeline was the first to be held in the church (which is now heritage-listed). George and Emmeline had no children.

== Legislative Council ==
From 1851 to 1855 George Leslie was a Member of the New South Wales Legislative Council for the Pastoral Districts of Clarence and Darling Downs, In 1854 he was a member of a commission for the colony's participation in the Paris Exhibition of 1855. He retired from the Legislative Council in February 1855.

He was an active advocate for the separation of Queensland as a separate colony, and he was a strong supporter that the boundary of the new colony should be at latitude 30°S which would include both the Clarence and Darling Downs districts in the new colony. However, the border between Queensland and New South wales was established between 28 and 29°S and the Clarence district remained part of New South Wales. His brother Patrick was briefly a member of the New South Wales Legislative Assembly in 1857.

== Later life ==
Leslie retired to England due to ill health in 1855. He died from an attack of haemorrhage of the lungs on 22 June 1860 at Farnborough House in Hampshire, England.

On 12 September 1865, his widow Emmeline married Vigant Falbe, a commander in the Royal Danish Navy, at the Priory Church, Great Malvern, England. They had two sons: Christian (1866–1914) and Vigant William (1868–1940). Commander Falbe died on 19 June 1871 in Hastings, England from the rigours of his earlier Polar expeditions. Emmeline died on 23 December 1891 in Cheltenham, England.

New South Wales Legislative Council
New district	Member for Pastoral Districts of Clarence & Darling Downs; Sep 1851 – Feb 1855	Succeeded by Thomas Hood
