= Thomas Hood Hood =

Australian politician

Thomas Hood Hood was an Australian politician.

He was a pastoralist and squatter. He was the elected member for Pastoral Districts of Clarence and Darling Downs of the New South Wales Legislative Council from 1855 to 1856, and an appointed member of the council from 1856 to 1861.

New South Wales Legislative Council
Preceded by George Leslie	Member for Pastoral Districts of Clarence & Darling Downs; April 1855 – Feb 1856	Council replaced by new parliament
