= Canning Downs =

Canning Downs Homestead
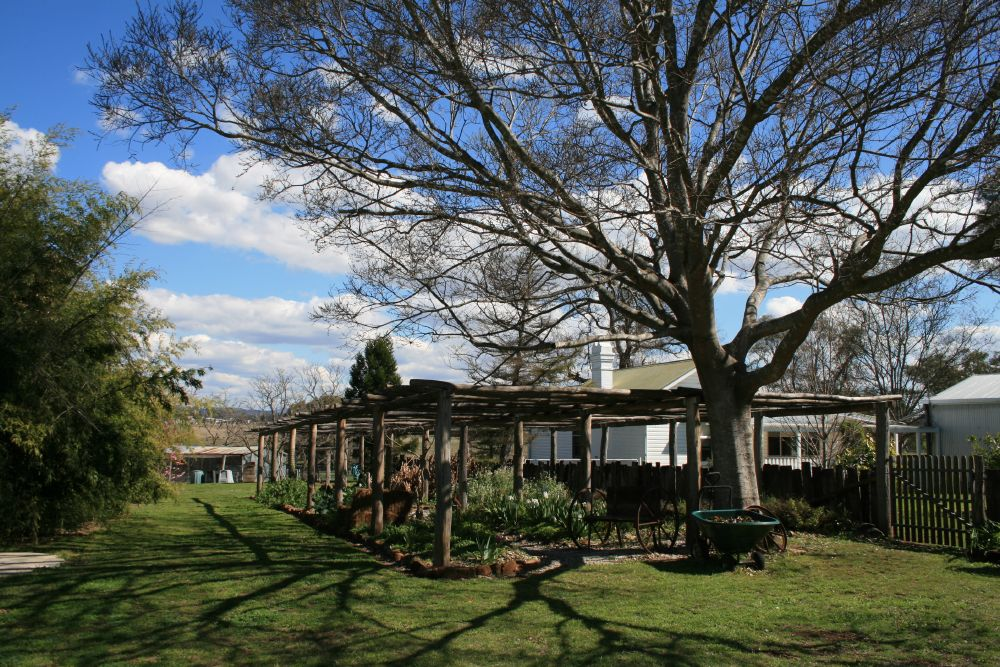
- Canning Downs Homestead, 2011

- Location within Queensland Location within Australia
- 28.2227°S 152.0574°E
- Location: Canning Downs, Warwick, Southern Downs Region, Queensland, Australia

History
- Design period: 1840s–1860s (mid-19th century)
- Built: 1847–1900

Queensland Heritage Register
- Official name: Canning Downs Homestead
- Type: state heritage (landscape, built, archaeological)
- Designated: 21 October 1992
- Reference no.: 600525
- Significant period: 1840s–1860s (historical); 1840s–1900s (fabric) ongoing (social)
- Significant components: views from, residential accommodation – main house, trees/plantings, kitchen/kitchen house, out building/s, chimney/chimney stack, stables, garden/grounds, roof/ridge ventilator/s / fleche/s, driveway

Canning Downs was one of the earliest homesteads established on the Darling Downs in Queensland, Australia. It is located a short drive from the town of Warwick and originally extended south east to Killarney and the McPherson Range. The area was first named after the British statesman George Canning by Allan Cunningham.

The fertile lands around the upper reaches of the Condamine River provided an excellent site for the home of early settler, Patrick Leslie. The station was first declared in the name of Walter Leslie on 7 July 1840.

Canning Downs Homestead is the heritage-listed homestead at Canning Downs. It was built from 1847 to 1900. It was added to the Queensland Heritage Register on 21 October 1992.

== History ==
The Canning Downs Station on the Darling Downs was squatted by the Leslie brothers in 1840 although the official licensee of Canning Downs was Ernest Elphinstone Dalrymple (who died in 1844 and left the property to the Leslie brothers). The principal timber slab residence on the homestead is likely to date from 1847–8, and has experienced several major additions over 150 years. The stables appear to date from the late 1850s.

Patrick Leslie, the second son of William and Jane (née Davidson) Leslie of Warthill, Aberdeenshire, Scotland, arrived in Australia in May 1835 with the intention of establishing a pastoral holding. Such was the intention of many young British men who saw opportunities for earning sufficient money and returning to their homeland financially secure with an assured income from the established property. It is thought that the haste with which Patrick Leslie proceeded in securing his fortune was the cause of the considerable financial troubles which beset him thereafter.

Upon his arrival in Australia, Patrick spent several years employed on stations first by the Macarthurs of Camden and then by his uncle WS Davidson at Collaroi. When Patrick's younger brothers, Walter and George, arrived in Australia in 1839, the three decided to explore the unsettled Darling Downs in search of land for a station of their own. Tales of the fertile Downs region had reached Patrick Leslie after Allan Cunningham's discovery of the area in 1827.

After reaching the Downs the Leslie Brothers quickly marked out land for their station which they named Canning Downs. Adjacent land was taken up by a friend, Ernest Elphinstone Dalrymple, for his station, Goomburra. It was soon clear to the Leslies that the run marked by them was too large and they moved their head station to what remained the Canning Downs portion of the run with the remainder becoming the Toolburra run.

Though all three brothers were in fact partners in the Canning Downs run, Patrick's name was omitted from all documentation regarding occupation of the place owing to his financial troubles. An arrangement formalising the ownership or lease of the Canning Downs run by the Leslies was slow in coming and their tenuous hold over the land was a source of constant worry as demonstrated in the letters written by the brothers to their family in Scotland. Patrick wrote in April 1841 that the Commissioner for Crown Lands had visited the station and given the brothers a letter of authorisation allowing them to retain the run. This letter also mentions that the head station was originally located south of the 1841 buildings. New buildings were constructed in late 1841, when the brothers feared encroachment of their run by the newcomers on the Downs who were causing considerable aggravation to the Leslie brothers.

By 1842 the Leslie brothers were in dire financial trouble, borrowing money from their father, and another brother living in China to simply maintain the station. All three brothers were forced to assume roles of active stockmen to reduce wage bills. Wool prices were low, labour was expensive and supplies were difficult to transport to the Downs. Patrick spent substantial amounts of time during the early 1840s in Dunheved, a farm leased by him near Penrith, Sydney. He married Katherine Macarthur, daughter of Hannibal Hawkins Macarthur of The Vineyard, Parramatta in September 1840, and the two remained living on the Macarthurs' station, before returning to Canning Downs in 1842.

At Canning Downs a cottage costing £35 and of unspecified material was built for the return of Patrick and his bride. Upon their return it was arranged that Patrick would oversee the cultivation and horse stock, Walter would manage the sheep and George the cattle.

Further financial concerns saw Patrick withdraw from Canning Downs and purchase a block of land in Brisbane on which he built a cottage which was to become Newstead House. Meanwhile, the Station was suffering from a prolonged absence of Walter Leslie. An interesting letter written by George to his parents in May 1845 details the plans for improvements to Canning Downs, including a new hut and stables, which he says will be constructed about 400 yards (370 m) lower down the river.

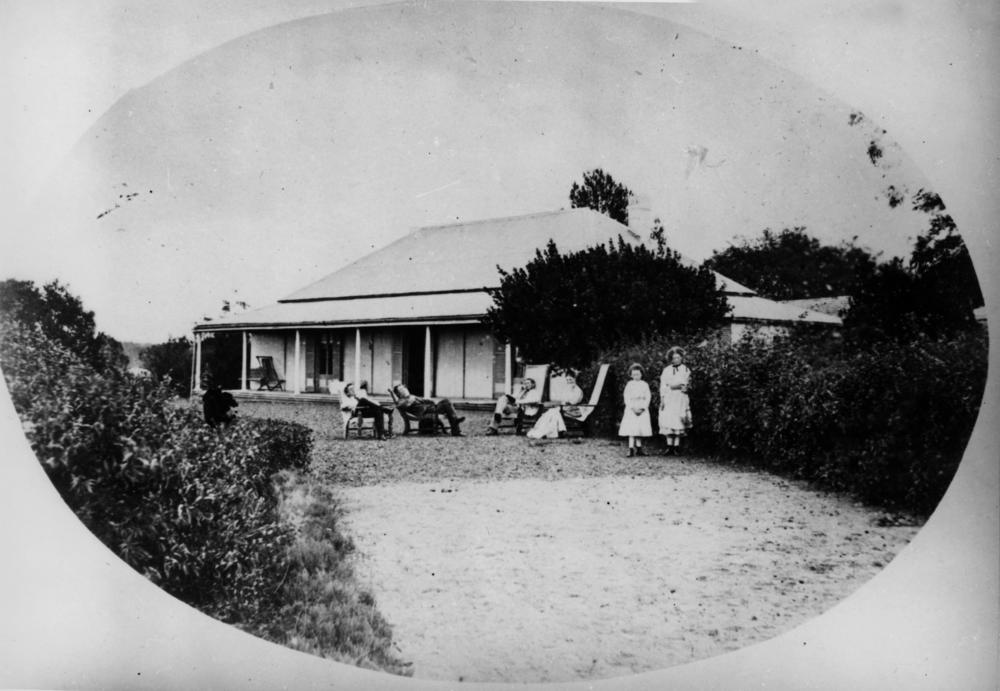
Homestead at Canning Downs Station, ca. 1875

Letters written by Walter and George during 1846 and 1847 indicate that improvements to the value of £1200-£1500 were planned and these were to include the construction of a "good house". In early December 1848, George married Emmeline Macarthur, who was another of the daughters of Hannibal Hawkins Macarthur, father of Patrick's wife. From Emmeline's memoirs it seems that the house in which she lived at Canning Downs upon her arrival after the wedding was a "cottage ...built of wood, painted white and lined with canvas, and pretty room papers, thoroughly and prettily furnished and surrounded by a white verandah". She continues on to say that a church service was held in a small hall of the house every Sunday at 11.00 a.m. for "several of our neighbours...employees and friends which produced quite a congregation". Emmeline suggests that their accommodation at Canning Downs was unusual,

"the cottage only afforded two spare rooms and with the chance of six friends suddenly appearing such accommodation was impossible. At the end of our cottage and parallel to our own, and divided by a covered way, the sides and verandah covered with vines, was a long building devoted to servants, storeroom and offices. We had one very large room and six folding beds made on (the) principal of a long camp stool, called a stretcher. They were seldom all unoccupied and not infrequently all were in request."

She also talks of French windows opening onto the verandah from both the hall and her bedroom. This description of the 1848 residence at Canning Downs suggests that the house into which Emmeline and George moved was, indeed, the timber slab house still today used as the residence. The long building referred to in the above description would then be the kitchen wing of the present structure. A sketch by Conrad Martens done in March 1852 provides further evidence of this. This shows the residence as a house with hipped roof, verandahs and shuttered French windows with a kitchen wing at the rear. Notes at the top of the sketch suggest that the building was white with "green venetians", presumably a reference to the fixed louvre shutters.

In 1847 the New South Wales government asked Patrick Leslie selected a part of the property to divide into smaller allotments for a township, which was to be called 'Cannington,' although the name 'Warwick' was eventually chosen. Land sales were held in 1850, and the first allotment was bought by Leslie.

Life on the Downs during the time of the Leslie occupation was quite difficult and financial problems burdened the squatters. The discovery of gold fields in Australia further increased the price and scarcity of labour on stations. Early searches for gold were carried out on the Darling Downs, not only with the intention of actually finding mineral rich fields, but also in a desperate attempt to lure workers and servants into the area. Searches for gold at Canning Downs resulted in the discovery of the Lucky Plains Goldfields which allowed George Leslie to realise his aspirations of wealth and make plans to return to his family in Scotland.. Emmeline and George did not remain at Canning Downs for very long, leaving for a year's rest in Scotland in the early 1850s and returning to Australia only to see the Station sold to George's cousin, Gilbert Davidson for £50,000 on 7 January 1854.

Davidson was the only son of Walter Stevenson Davidson, a close friend of John Macarthur of Camden. The Davidson managed and owned various pastoral stations in New South Wales, including Collaroi on which Patrick Leslie worked upon his arrival in Australia.

Though little documentary evidence has been located, it seems that the quadrangular stable block was built during Davidson's ownership of Canning Downs which lasted only until 1865. The Sydney Morning Herald of 26 November 1859 reports on an extensive fire at Canning Downs, which started in the stables. The report continues to say that "a large range of buildings, nearly forty yards long, and comprising hayloft and coach house, were entirely consumed...It was apparently owing to the direction of the wind that the dwelling-houses were not also destroyed". The extant stables are thought to have been constructed after this fire, from bricks hand made from Killarney clay at a cost of £3000.

The stable, when built and extant today, is a square planned building with an open central courtyard. The roofs of the four sides of the building are clad with corrugated iron, and this iron is believed to have been in one of the earliest shipments of corrugated iron to Queensland. All corrugated iron was imported to Australia until 1921 when Lysaghts began its manufacture. The material was used in Melbourne as early as 1852, but manufacturers were still experimenting with galvanising, a method of coating iron with zinc. Early galvanising techniques were primitive and involved dipping the sheets into molton zinc, resulting in large deposits of zinc on the iron which protected the material much better than the latter mechanised techniques. Thus many early corrugated iron roofs have remained remarkably intact.

This may be the case with the corrugated iron roof of the stable at Canning Downs, which, according to photographs and oral history has not been altered since construction in about 1859. The roof retains four iron ventilators on the pyramidal sections over the four corners of the building, which also appear in the earliest photographs of the structure. The roof framing is a series of closely spaced trusses with battens, further apart than is needed for shingles but much closer than standard corrugated iron roof framing. It is thought that because the technology of iron clad roofing was novel and little understood, the framing was cautiously planned and overcompensated for the actual weight of the iron.

Several early photographs of the residence and stables at Canning Downs survive from the time of Davidson's ownership. These show a substantial timber slab house with a steeply pitched hipped roof of shingles, and shingled verandah awnings surrounding the building. French doors open onto the verandahs. Davidson may have replaced the shingled roof of the main residence with a corrugated iron roof as one of the photographs apparently dating from this time shows the replacement occurring.

Davidson owned Canning Downs until 1865, when on 18 November he sold the entire station to Frederick John Cobb Wildash. The property comprising 3,040 acres (1,230 ha) with 53,700 sheep, 5000 cattle, 70 horses and improvements was sold for £100,000. A default on repayments to Alexander McDonald and Charles Smith, merchants of Sydney, who loaned money to Wildash for the property, saw Canning Downs sold again on 4 June 1874 to John Donald Macansh. Macansh, a Scot, emigrated to Australia after the death of his father, with his mother and siblings. After managing various stations in New South Wales, Macansh moved to Queensland and undertook the management of Canning Downs.

In 1877, 25,000 acres (10,000 ha) of land was resumed from the Canning Downs pastoral run to establish smaller farms. The land was offered for selection on 19 April 1877.

In 1886 Macansh was appointed to the Queensland Legislative Assembly, and he was generally held in high esteem by the community in which he lived. After his death on 1 August 1896 Canning Downs was managed by a family trust comprising his eleven children.

During the time of their management extensive alterations were carried out on the residence. Local Warwick architects, Wallace and Gibson undertook extensions of the house in 1898–1899. The architects, a partnership of William Wallace and Richard Gibson, designed many buildings in and around Warwick including St George's Masonic Hall and the Barnes & Co department store in Palmerin Street. The extensions at Canning Downs comprised the addition of timber wings abutting either side of the principal residence. Both of which were rectangular planned with hipped corrugated iron roofs and discrete verandah awnings on the front and side elevations. The wings were timber framed and clad with chamfered horizontal boarding, with decorative timber features including cross-braced balustrading and fretwork column brackets.

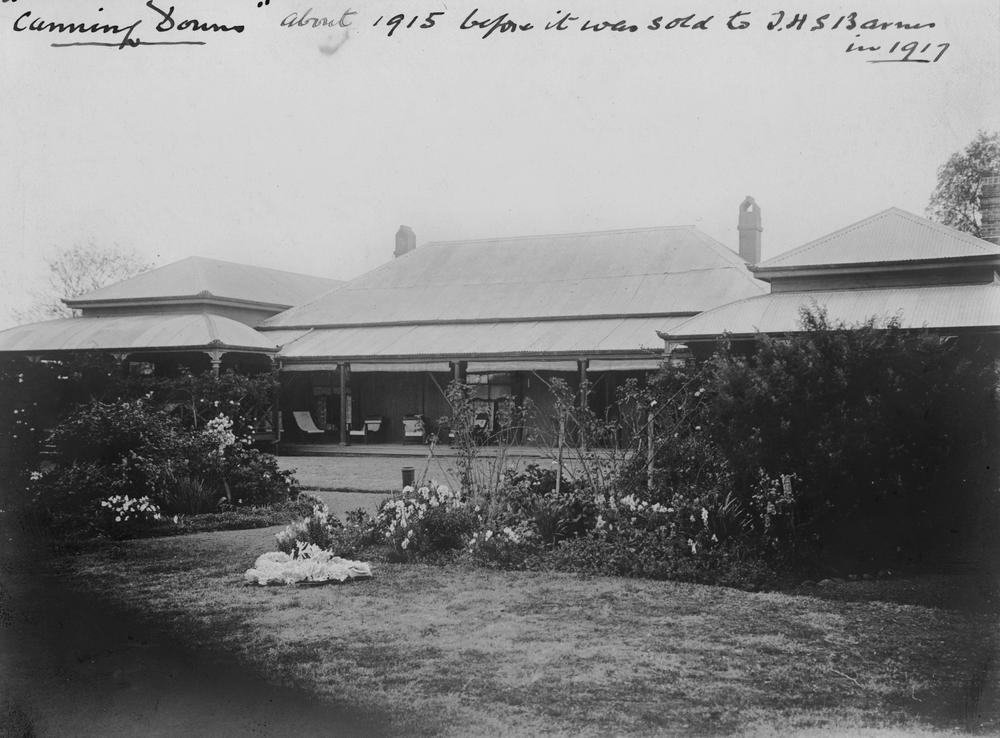
Canning Downs station homestead and gardens, Warwick district, 1914

The Canning Downs estate was then subdivided, and that portions containing the residence and stables was sold to Henry Richard Needham on 2 March 1906 who owned it only until 9 January 1918 the ownership of the Canning Downs Homestead was transferred to John Hawkins Smith and Sara Barnes, parents of the present owner Charles Edward Barnes. The Barnes family were a prominent horse-breeding and horse racing family who owned the Lyndhurst pastoral station in far north Queensland. Canning Downs became an important stud, with many successful racing horses reared there.

Soon after the Barnes family moved to Canning Downs in 1918 a large porch was added to the house, in the popular Californian Bungalow style. At this time other cosmetic alterations were undertaken.

During the 1970s the corrugated iron roof of the residence, including the kitchen wing was replaced with a decromastic tile roof. Recently (c. 1994) extensive work has been undertaken on the residence. The c. 1918 porch was removed, the verandahs enclosed with aluminium framed glazing, the interior has been entirely re-worked and the decromastic tile roof replaced on the central section of the residence with a new corrugated iron roof.

== Description ==
The Canning Downs Homestead is a complex of buildings including a timber residence with kitchen wing, brick stables and outbuildings. The Homestead is picturesquely situated facing eastward, looking over wide plains to the Great Dividing Range.

The central core of the residence has a simple rectangular plan with steeply pitched corrugated iron hipped roof on the eastern side of which is a projecting hipped section. This section of the building is constructed from vertical timber slabs housed in rebated sections at the base and top of the walls. Within the principal entrance facade of the building, under the projecting hipped section of the roof, denoting the former porch are four aluminium framed glazed sliding doors slightly projecting from the face of the flanking external walls. Adjacent to these doors evidence is retained of the c. 1920 Bungalow additions to the house, with grouped chamfered columns on tapering stuccoed masonry bases.

The rear of the central core is lined with a verandah supported on timber posts and joined at roof level to the covered walkway linking this building with the kitchen wing. Internally the central core has been subject to many alterations recently, with only the now stripped stone fireplaces retaining evidence of the former house. From the eastern enclosed verandah a principal entrance door of timber opens onto an entrance area from which access is provided to the dining room to the south and another room to the west which runs the length of the house and from where access is provided to the side wings. Two full length vertical sash windows provide access from the enclosed verandah to the dining room.

This central core is abutted on the north and south ends by added wings also with hipped roofs and with overhanging verandah awnings all clad with slate grey decromastic tiles. The verandahs of the wings have been infilled; the base of the infilled wall being formed by squared rubble sandstone walls, the sandstone for which was got from a stone cottage on the site. Above these walls are aluminium framed glazing. The wings are constructed from horizontal chamfered timber boarding, and several full length vertical sash windows and French doors open onto the verandah from the various internal rooms.

The kitchen wing runs north-south parallel to the house and is joined to it by a walkway with a pitched decromastic tiled awning. A low verandah awning on the west elevation of the kitchen is supported on squared timber posts. The building is constructed from vertical timber slabs*. Under the verandah awning access is provided to the three major rooms which constitute the wing, through single doorways housing timber doors. A tapering brick chimney shaft abuts the eastern side of the wing, and this is flanked by a rendered masonry wall section.

To the south of the residence complex is a large fenced area containing established trees and planting and remnants of an early trellis and garden walkway. Adjacent to this are many buildings, most of which have been moved to this site from further lying reaches of the station. These buildings include a corrugated iron clad tank stand with storage sheds; a small corrugated iron clad building with a gabled corrugated iron roof; two timber boarded buildings and a concrete block enclosure.

Beyond these buildings, to the east of the residence is the brick stable block. This is a quadrangular building; four long wings joined to form a square surrounding an internal grassed courtyard. The building has an overhanging pitched corrugated iron roof which is hipped over the four corners and surmounting the peaks thus formed are iron ventilators. The corner blocks of the building project slightly from the face of adjacent walls.

The principal entrance to the stables is on the north side of the building, where a centrally located gateway emphasised on the roof line by projecting pyramidal roof feature. The external elevation of the building are quite simple with timber doorways and high level window openings. Those elevation facing inward toward the courtyard are more complex, with an assortment of timber paling and latticework gates and timber boarded doors. Internally the building houses a series of stables.

Extending from the south elevation is a low one storeyed timber wing, of vertical slab construction, providing further equine accommodation which is more exposed to the weather. There are various timber weatherboard additions to the western side of the building.

Adjacent to the stables are early outbuildings and grounds associated with the principal building. Many small fenced paddocks and pens survive, as does a large storage shed.

== Heritage listing ==
Canning Downs Homestead was listed on the Queensland Heritage Register on 21 October 1992 having satisfied the following criteria.

The place is important in demonstrating the evolution or pattern of Queensland's history.

Canning Downs, one of the earliest homesteads established on the Darling Downs provides remarkable evidence of the pastoral and agricultural growth of South East Queensland.

The place demonstrates rare, uncommon or endangered aspects of Queensland's cultural heritage.

Although the age of the various buildings comprising the residence is unknown, it is likely that at least some of the structures date from the Leslie occupation of the run in the 1840s and early 1850s, making this a rare and early example of residential building in Queensland. The brick stables are rare in their form and age, and may have some of the earliest corrugated iron roofing used in Queensland, demonstrating the development of this technology.

The place has potential to yield information that will contribute to an understanding of Queensland's history.

Great potential exists for further archaeological research on both the buildings and grounds at Canning Downs which are intact despite a long and varied history.

The place is important in demonstrating the principal characteristics of a particular class of cultural places.

The residence and the stables, with associated grounds including the gardens, paddocks and driveway, provide a good example of a mid-nineteenth century pastoral run. The stables are an intact example of a building of this type.

The place is important because of its aesthetic significance.

The buildings and grounds have aesthetic value, increased by their situation and context. The stable is a well composed structure of great architectural merit. The gardens and grounds surrounding these buildings contribute to their setting. Many established trees and early garden areas are of importance.

The place is important in demonstrating a high degree of creative or technical achievement at a particular period.

The brick stables are rare in their form and age, and may have some of the earliest corrugated iron roofing used in Queensland, demonstrating the development of this technology.

The place has a strong or special association with a particular community or cultural group for social, cultural or spiritual reasons.

The station is of cultural importance to Queenslanders as one of the earliest European homes surviving in the state.

The place has a special association with the life or work of a particular person, group or organisation of importance in Queensland's history.

Canning Downs is associated with many people of importance to Queensland history including Patrick, George and Walter Leslie and their families who were instrumental in opening the Darling Downs for pastoral runs and settlement.
