= Edward Smith Hill =

Australian politician (1818–1880)

Edward Smith Hill (26 October 1818 — 17 March 1880) was an Australian politician.

He was one of Charles Cowper's 21 appointments to the New South Wales Legislative Council in May 1861, but did not take his seat. He was a wine and spirit merchant.

== See also ==
- Gerard Krefft's dismissal from office and subsequent legal action
