= Henry Mort =

Australian politician

The Honourable Henry Mort
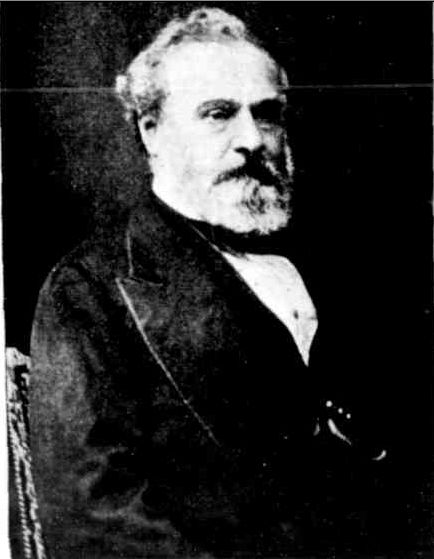

Member of the New South Wales Legislative Assembly for West Moreton
- In office 21 June 1859 – 10 December 1859
- Preceded by: New seat
- Succeeded by: Seat abolished

Member of the New South Wales Legislative Assembly for West Macquarie
- In office 2 December 1859 – 10 November 1860
- Preceded by: John McPhillamy
- Succeeded by: Richard Driver

Member of Legislative Council of New South Wales
- In office 22 August 1882 – 6 September 1900

Personal details
- Born: Henry Mort; 23 December 1818 Bolton, Lancashire, England
- Died: 6 September 1900 (aged 81) Woollahra, New South Wales, Australia
- Resting place: St Jude's Church and Cemetery
- Spouse: Maria Laidley (m.1846 d.1873)
- Occupation: Pastoralist, Woolbroker, Insurance broker

Henry Mort (23 December 1818 – 6 September 1900) was a pastoralist, businessman, and politician in Queensland and New South Wales, Australia. He was a Member of the New South Wales Legislative Assembly and a Member of the New South Wales Legislative Council.

== Early life ==
Henry Mort was born on 23 December 1818 at Willowfield, Bolton, Lancashire, England, the son of Jonathon Mort and his wife Mary (née Sutcliffe). He was educated in Manchester and came to Australia in 1840.

From about 1841 to 1855 he was one of the pioneers in the Moreton Bay district (now the State of Queensland) working on pastoral stations. He was manager of Cressbrook Station in the Brisbane River Valley for David Cannon McConnel. Then in 1849, his brother Thomas Sutcliffe Mort leased the Laidley Plains pastoral station and appointed Henry Mort as manager. Henry Mort converted the station from sheep to cattle. In 1852, Henry Mort and his brother-in-law James Laidley took over the lease with Mort managing the Franklyn Vale portion of the station.

On 6 My 1846 he married Maria Laidley, the daughter of James Laidley (senior), in St James' Church, Sydney.

In 1855, Henry Mort moved to Sydney and became a partner in his brother's woolbroking business Mort & Co., later Goldsbrough Mort & Co. He was involved in many insurance companies and banks and one of the promoters of the Sydney Meat Preserving Company.

== Politics ==
Mort represented West Moreton (then part of New South Wales) in the New South Wales Legislative Assembly from June 1859 to the seat's abolition with the separation of Queensland in December 1859. He then represented West Macquarie from December 1859 to November 1860. He was appointed a lifetime Member of the New South Wales Legislative Council on 22 Aug 1882.

== Later life ==
Henry Mort donated £3,000 to the construction of All Saints Anglican Church in Ocean Street, Woollahra; Mort lived in that street and his eldest son Henry Wallace Mort was the rector of the church.

Mort died from pneumonia at his residence Anglesea, Ocean Street, Woollahra, Sydney on 6 September 1900 aged 81 years. His funeral proceeded from his Woollahra residence to the All Saints Church and then to the St Jude's Church and Cemetery for burial.

== Legacy ==
The now heritage-listed Franklyn Vale Homestead in Grandchester, Queensland was established on Henry Mort's Franklyn Vale property in the early 1870s for his daughter and son-in-law, Edward Crace. Henry Mort was an occasional visitor to the property.

The locality of Mount Mort in the vicinity of the homestead is named after the Mort family.

All Saints Anglican Church is a heritage building.

New South Wales Legislative Assembly
New seat	Member for West Moreton; 1859	Seat abolished
Preceded by John McPhillamy	Member for West Macquarie; 1859–1860	Succeeded by Richard Driver
