= Electoral district of East Moreton (New South Wales) =

Former state electoral district of New South Wales, Australia

East Moreton New South Wales—Legislative Assembly
- State: New South Wales
- Created: July 1859
- Abolished: December 1859

East Moreton was an electoral district of the Legislative Assembly in the Australian state of New South Wales created for the July 1859 election, partly replacing Stanley County in the Moreton Bay region around Brisbane. It was abolished in December 1859, as a result of the Separation of Queensland.

== Members for East Moreton ==
Member	Party	Period
Robert Cribb	None	1859–1859

== Election results ==
=== Elections in the 1850s ===
==== 1859 ====
1859 New South Wales colonial election: East Moreton Saturday 18 June
Candidate	Votes	%
Robert Cribb (elected)	178	60.8
William Tooth	115	39.3
Total formal votes	115	100.0
Informal votes	293	0.0
Turnout	293	46.5
