= Electoral district of Darling Downs (New South Wales) =

Former state electoral district of New South Wales, Australia

Darling Downs New South Wales—Legislative Assembly
- State: New South Wales
- Created: July 1859
- Abolished: December 1859
- Namesake: Darling Downs

Darling Downs was an electoral district of the Legislative Assembly in the Australian state of New South Wales from July 1859 to December 1859, representing the Darling Downs, prior to the Separation of Queensland. It elected two members simultaneously, with voters having two votes each.

== Members for Darling Downs ==
Member	Party	Period	Member	Party	Period
John Douglas	None	1859–1859	William Handcock	None	1859–1859

== Election results ==
=== Elections in the 1850s ===
==== 1859 ====
1859 New South Wales colonial election: Darling Downs Tuesday 5 July
Candidate	Votes	%
John Douglas (elected 1)	383	33.7
William Handcock (elected 2)	377	33.2
John McLean	375	33.0
Total formal votes	1,135	100.0
Informal votes	0	0.0
Turnout	1,135	35.7
