= Electoral district of West Moreton (New South Wales) =

Former state electoral district of New South Wales, Australia

West Moreton New South Wales—Legislative Assembly
- State: New South Wales
- Created: July 1859
- Abolished: December 1859

West Moreton was an electoral district for the Legislative Assembly in the Australian state of New South Wales created for the July 1859 election, partly replacing Stanley County in the Moreton Bay region around Brisbane. It was abolished in December 1859 with the establishment of Queensland as a separate colony.

== Members for West Moreton ==
Member	Party	Term
Henry Mort	None	1859–1859

== Election results ==
=== 1859 ===
1859 New South Wales colonial election: West Moreton Tuesday 21 June
Candidate	Votes	%
Henry Mort (elected)	245	70.4
Henry Challinor	103	29.6
Total formal votes	245	100.0
Informal votes	348	0.0
Turnout	348	49.0
