= William Handcock (Australian politician) =

Australian politician (1808–1890)

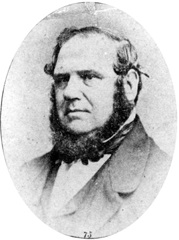

Member of the New South Wales Legislative Assembly for Darling Downs
- In office 5 July 1859 – 10 December 1859
- Preceded by: New seat
- Succeeded by: Seat abolished

Personal details
- Born: William Handcock; 1808
- Died: 2 December 1890 (aged 81 or 82)<Queensland death index></ref> [Dunwich Asylum,Stradbroke Island, Queenslan Australia <https://trove.nla.gov.au/newspaper/article/218319772?searchTerm=handcock#></ref>
- Occupation: Shopkeeper

William Handcock (1808 – 26 November 1890) was an Australian politician.

He was a storekeeper at Drayton before entering politics. In 1859 he was elected to the New South Wales Legislative Assembly for Darling Downs, but with the establishment of the separate colony of Queensland the seat was discontinued later that year..

New South Wales Legislative Assembly
New seat	Member for Darling Downs; 1859; Served alongside: John Douglas	Abolished
