= William Tooth =

Australian politician

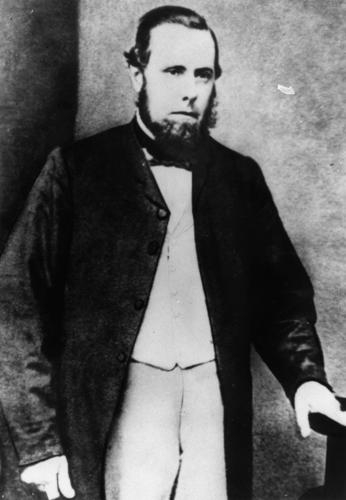

Member of Parliament for United Pastoral Districts of Moreton, Wide Bay, Burnett, Maranoa, Leichhardt and Port Curtis
- In office 12 February 1858 – 11 April 1859
- Preceded by: Patrick Leslie
- Succeeded by: Seat abolished

Personal details
- Born: 1 January 1823 Cranbrook, Kent, England
- Died: 5 June 1876 (aged 53) Toowoomba, Queensland, Australia
- Resting place: Drayton and Toowoomba Cemetery
- Party: None
- Spouse: Lucy Ann Harris (m.1850 d.1916)
- Children: Nine children

William Butler Tooth (1823 – 1876) was an English born Australian politician and pastoralist, who represented the electoral district of Moreton, Wide Bay, Burnett, Maranoa, Leichhardt and Port Curtis in the New South Wales Legislative Assembly from 1858 until 1859.

He was the founder of the Union Club and was a member of the committees of the Sydney Club, the Society for Suppression of Cattle Stealing and the Agricultural Society of New South Wales.

Tooth married Lucy Ann Harris (died 1916) in Sydney in 1850 and together had nine children. He died in Toowoomba in 1876 and was buried in Drayton and Toowoomba Cemetery.

New South Wales Legislative Assembly
Preceded by Patrick Leslie as Member for Moreton, Wide Bay, Burnett and Maranoa	Member for Moreton, Wide Bay, Burnett, Maranoa, Leichhardt and Port Curtis; 1858–1859	Seat abolished
