= Gordon Sandeman =

Australian politician

Member of the New South Wales Legislative Assembly for Moreton, Wide Bay, Burnett and Maranoa
- In office 17 April 1856 – 10 October 1857
- Preceded by: New seat
- Succeeded by: Patrick Leslie

Member of the Queensland Legislative Assembly for Leichhardt
- In office 30 June 1863 – 13 September 1870 Serving with Charles Royds, Edmund Royds
- Preceded by: Robert Herbert
- Succeeded by: John Scott

Member of the Queensland Legislative Council
- In office 2 January 1874 – 18 August 1886

Personal details
- Born: Gordon Sandeman; 1810 Edinburgh, Scotland
- Died: 14 March 1897 (aged 86–87) Brondesbury, London, England
- Spouse: Ernestine Eugene de Satge St Jean
- Occupation: Pastoralist, politician

Gordon Sandeman (1810 – 14 March 1897) was an Australian politician and a member of the New South Wales Legislative Assembly, Queensland Legislative Assembly, and the Queensland Legislative Council.

== Early life ==
Sandeman was born in Edinburgh and was the son of a merchant. He emigrated to the Moreton Bay district in 1838 and established a mercantile business. He also acquired significant pastoral interests in the Wide Bay and Burnett districts. After suffering some financial difficulties in the 1880s, Sandeman returned to the United Kingdom where he died aged 87.

== State Parliament of New South Wales ==
In the first election for the New South Wales Legislative Assembly in 1856, Sandeman was elected unopposed as the member for Moreton, Wide Bay, Burnett and Maranoa. Sandeman's election occurred prior to the separation of Queensland from New South Wales in 1859 and his electorate was in an area which is currently part of South-East Queensland. He resigned from parliament after 18 months to concentrate on his business interests.

== State Parliament of Queensland ==
After Queensland separated from New South Wales, Sandeman represented the seat of Leichhardt in the Queensland Legislative Assembly from 1863 to 1870. In 1874 he was then appointed to the Queensland Legislative Council, holding that position till it was declared vacant in 1886.

New South Wales Legislative Assembly
Preceded by First election	Member for Moreton, Wide Bay, Burnett and Maranoa; 1856 – 1857	Succeeded by Patrick Leslie
Parliament of Queensland
Preceded by Robert Herbert	Member for Leichhardt; 1863–1870; Served alongside: Charles Royds, Edmund Royds	Succeeded by John Scott
