= Patrick Leslie =

Australian politician

Patrick Leslie JP
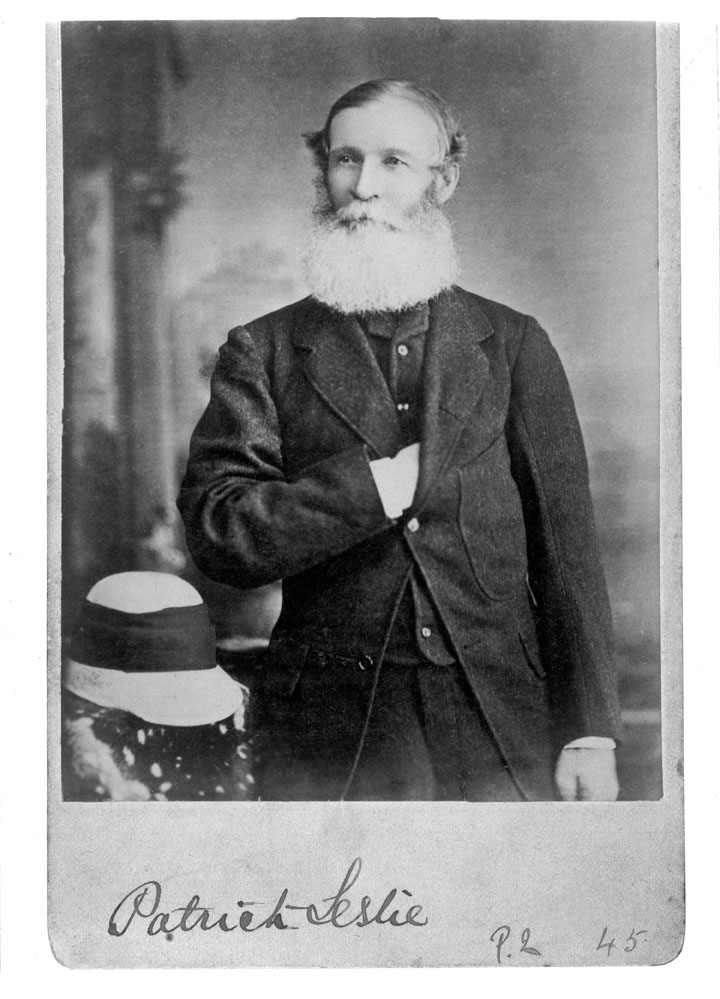
- Patrick Leslie, 1877

Member of the New South Wales Legislative Assembly for Moreton, Wide Bay, Burnett and Maranoa
- In office 19 November 1857 – 19 December 1857
- Preceded by: Gordon Sandeman
- Succeeded by: Seat abolished

Personal details
- Born: Patrick Leslie; 25 September 1815 Warthill, Aberdeenshire, Scotland
- Died: 12 August 1881 (aged 65) Sydney, Australia
- Resting place: St Thomas’ Anglican Church Cemetery
- Spouse: Catherine Macarthur (m.1840 d.1894)
- Relations: Hannibal Macarthur (father-in-law)
- Occupation: Pioneer, Grazier, Politician

Patrick Leslie (25 September 1815 – 12 August 1881) was a Scottish settler in Australia. Leslie and his two brothers (Walter and George) were the first to settle on the Darling Downs, and he was the first person to buy land in Warwick.

== Early life ==
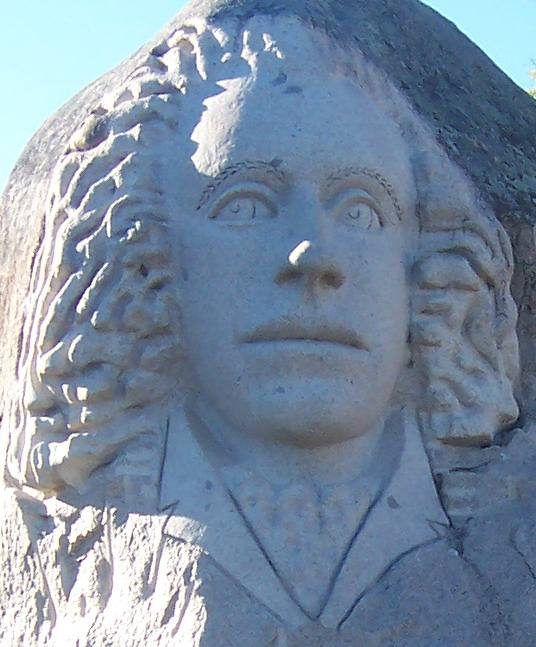
Patrick Leslie sculpture

Partick Leslie was born in Warthill, also known as Meikle Wartle, in Aberdeenshire on 25 September 1815. He was the second son of William and Jane Leslie. His father was the 8th Laird of Folla and 9th Laird of Warthill, JP, DL, 27th in line of descent from the 1st Baron of Balquhain. The Leslies were members of the Church of Scotland.

In December 1834, Leslie left London as a passenger aboard the convict transport Emma Eugenia, arriving in Sydney in May 1835. By 1836 he was managing Collaroi, a property owned by his uncle, Walter Stevenson Davidson, in the Cassilis district of New South Wales. Later on he rented Dunheved farm at Penrith. Leslie was a poor manager however, and his activities drew criticism from his uncle, who was forced to sell the property to his relations, E. W. T. Hamilton and George Clive, by 1840. Leslie was left deeply in debt to Davidson as a result of this episode. When his brothers Walter and George arrived in the colony, Patrick decided to look for new land to the north.

== Activity on the Darling Downs ==
In 1840 Patrick Leslie started with stock from a New England station, then the most northerly settled district in New South Wales, and squatted Toolburra and Canning Downs (at 28.226419°S 152.065747°E), the first stations on the Condamine River, before the river had been identified as a tributary of the Darling River. Leslie met explorer Allan Cunningham at the home of Hannibal Hawkins Macarthur in Parramatta. In 1840 Leslie, accompanied by a convict named Peter Murphy, followed in the footsteps of the explorer. On the return trip to Sydney he marked a trail by cutting into the trees. This became known as "Leslie’s marked tree line".

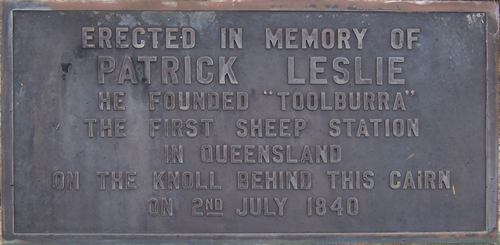
Plaque near Toolburra

On his return to Sydney Leslie married Catherine (Kate), daughter of Hannibal Hawkins Macarthur, at Parramatta on 9 September 1840. His best man at the wedding was Stuart Donaldson. On 2 July 1840, the first head station was established by Walter Leslie at Toolburra. Walter and George Leslie then set about building a residence at Canning Downs. Although the three Leslie brothers claimed all the land to the head of the Condamine River, including its tributaries, they were forced to give up most of the claim to new arrivals because of the requirement that all land claimed had to be adequately stocked.

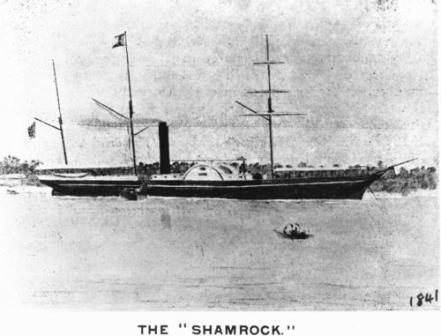

In 1841 Leslie and his wife travelled from Sydney to Brisbane aboard the Hunter River Steam Navigation Company steamer, Shamrock. They were then counted as the first family to make the journey from Brisbane to the Darling Downs. By 1841 the Leslies had sold their interest in 'Toolburra' and moved to 'Canning Downs' which was managed by George and Walter Leslie. When the Leslies first settled on Canning Downs, they had 6000 sheep, two teams of bullocks and drays, one team of horses and a dray, 10 saddle horses, and 22 convict employees. The task of building up the property during a time of depression proved too difficult and Patrick Leslie was ruined financially by 1844.

In 1845 Leslie acquired 14 hectares of land in his father's name on the banks of Breakfast Creek, Brisbane and built Newstead House (27.4426°S 153.0462°E), where he lived while pasturing flocks at Canning Downs. In 1846 he acquired 'Goomburra' on the Darling Downs. Newstead House was sold to his brother-in-law, John Clements Wickham, the following year.

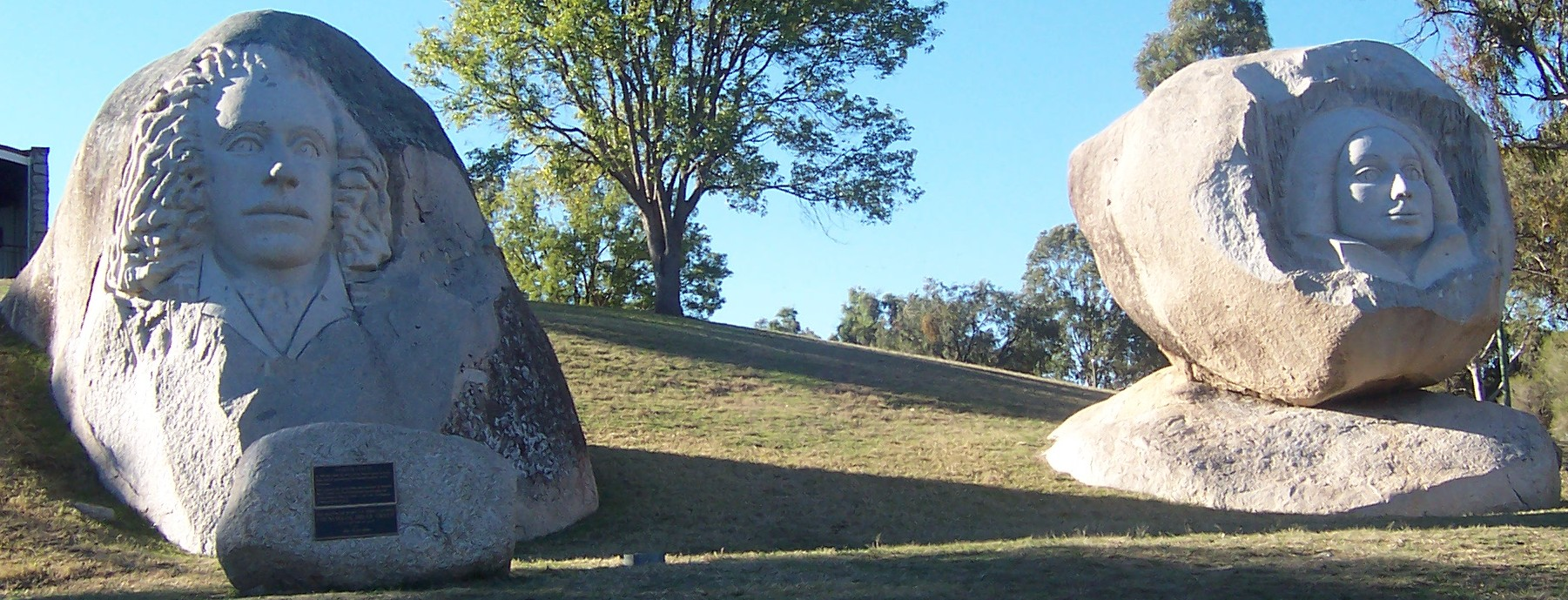
The Leslie Sculptures, Leslie Dam near Warwick.

In 1847 the Government of New South Wales asked Leslie to select a site for a town on Canning Downs station. It was to be known as Canningtown, the local Aborigines knew the area as Gooragooby, but the name Warwick was eventually chosen. At the first land sale in Warwick 1848 Patrick Leslie bought the first allotment. Today much of the water supply for city of Warwick is drawn from Leslie Dam, and larger than life granite sculptures of and Patrick and Catherine Leslie are located in a park adjacent to the dam wall.

In 1851, Leslie also bought nearby Gladfield Station.

In 1854 after selling Goomburra to Robert Tooth, Leslie left Australia with his wife and son and returned to Britain.

== Politics ==
Leslie was elected as member of the NSW Legislative Assembly for the seat of Moreton, Wide Bay, Burnett and Maranoa from 19 November to 19 December 1857, when the parliament was dissolved. Leslie did not contest the 1858 election.

== New Zealand ==
Patrick Leslie and his family moved to New Zealand, arriving in Auckland on 20 October 1868. He purchased land in Waikato, where he established a productive farm and sheep stud at Wartle, just south of Hamilton, on New Zealand's North Island. He sold his New Zealand holdings due to failing health in 1879, returning to Australia in his retirement.

== Retirement and death ==
In 1879 he retired to Milsons Point, Sydney, where he died on 12 August 1881 following a short illness. He was buried in plot 799 at St Thomas’ Anglican Church Cemetery in West Street, Crows Nest, Sydney. Leslie was survived by his wife, Catherine and four grandchildren.

== Legacy ==
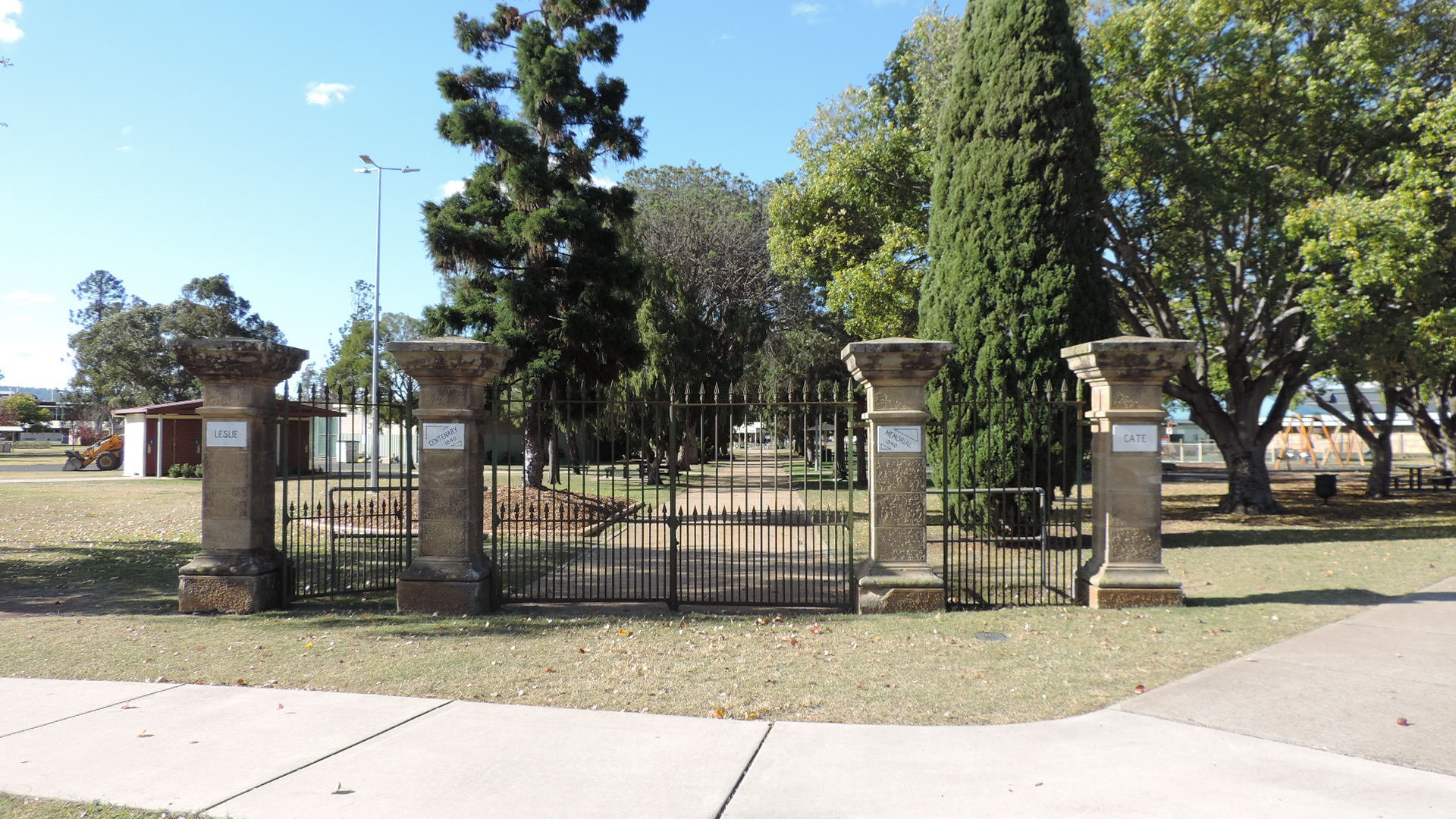
Leslie centenary memorial gates, 2015

The Leslie brothers are memorialised by a set of gates to Leslie Park in Warwick on the corner of Fitzroy and Guy Streets. These gates were taken from the Glengallan Homestead and re-erected in the Park to commemorate the centenary of the Leslie brothers establishing Canning Downs pastoral run.

New South Wales Legislative Assembly
Preceded by Gordon Sandeman	Member for Moreton, Wide Bay, Burnett and Maranoa; Nov–Dec 1857	Succeeded by William Tooth as member for Moreton, Wide Bay, Burnett, Maranoa, Leichhardt and Port Curtis
