= 1859 New South Wales colonial election =

Colonial election for New South Wales, Australia in 1859

- 9 June 1859 – 7 July 1859

All 80 seats in the New South Wales Legislative Assembly 41 Assembly seats were needed for a majority
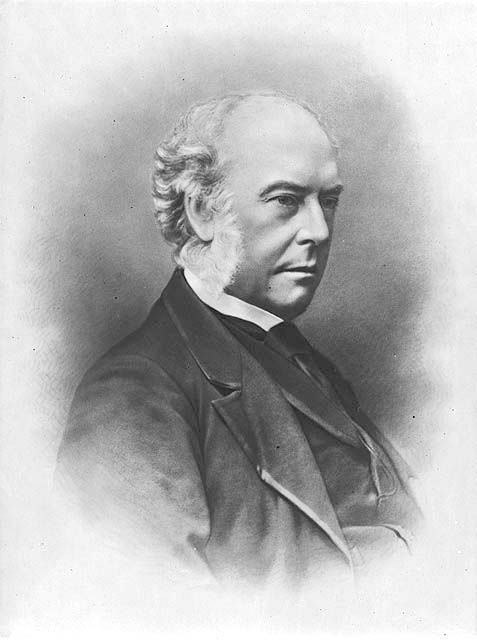

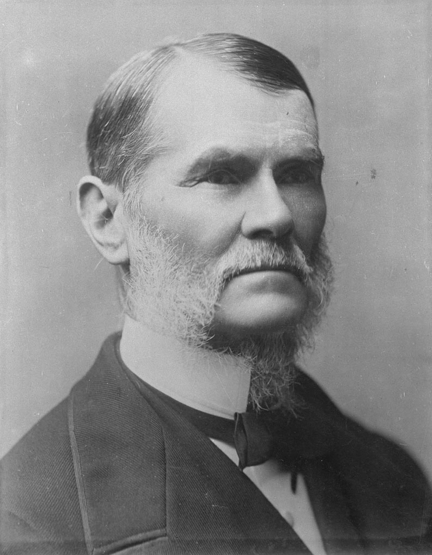
| | First party | Second party |
|---|---|---|
| Leader | Charles Cowper | William Forster |
| Party | Government | Opposition |
| Leader's seat | East Sydney | Queanbeyan |
| Seats won | 34 | 27 |
- Results of the election, showing winners in each seat. Seats without member charts indicate the electorate returned one member.
Premier before election
Charles Cowper
Elected Premier
Charles Cowper

The 1859 New South Wales colonial election was held between 9 June and 7 July 1859. This election was for all of the 80 seats in the New South Wales Legislative Assembly and it was conducted in 58 single-member constituencies, seven 2-member constituencies and two 4-member constituencies, all with a first past the post system. Suffrage was limited to adult white males. The previous parliament of New South Wales was dissolved on 11 April 1859 by the Governor, Sir William Denison, on the advice of the Premier, Charles Cowper.

There was no recognisable party structure at this election; instead the government was determined by a loose, shifting factional system. Reporters from the Maitland Mercury recognised 22 members as being part of the government, while 17 members were part of the opposition. Other members were either not sitting, not recognised by the reporters, or a member of the crossbench.

== Key dates ==
| Date | Event |
|---|---|
| 11 April 1859 | The Legislative Assembly was dissolved, and writs were issued by the Governor to proceed with an election. |
| 7 June to 26 June 1859 | Nominations for candidates for the election closed. |
| 9 June to 7 July 1859 | Polling days. |
| 30 August 1859 | Opening of new Parliament. |

== Results ==
New South Wales colonial election, 9 June 1859 – 7 July 1859 Legislative Assembly << 1858–1860 >>
| Enrolled voters | 78,231 | | | | |
| Votes cast | 52,153 | | Turnout | 52.54 (Note: There were 15 uncontested districts and turnout is based on the roll of 65,630 for the contested districts.) | +9.45 |
| Informal votes | 26 | | Informal | 0.08 | +0.08 |
Summary of votes by party
| Party | Primary votes | % | Swing | Seats | Change |
| Total | 52,153 | | | 80 | |

Parliament structure based on Reporters from the Maitland Mercury.
| Government | Opposition | Crossbench |
|---|---|---|
| William Arnold | Gilbert Eliott | William Cape |
| James Atkinson | William Forster | Edward Close |
| Lyttleton Bayley | James Hart | Stephen Dark |
| James Byrnes | John Hay | Edward Flood |
| John Campbell | Arthur Hodgson | William Handcock |
| Charles Cowper | Nicolas Hyeronimus | Clark Irving |
| William Dalley | Samuel Lyons | Robert Jamison |
| Daniel Cooper | William Macleay | Andrew Loder |
| John Douglas | James Martin | George Lord |
| Daniel Egan | Augustus Morris | Randolph Nott |
| John Garrett | Terence Murray | Henry Parkes |
| John Hargrave | William Piddington | William Roberts |
| Richard Jones | John Plunkett | William Windeyer |
| John Lang | William Russell | Robert Wisdom |
| John Laycock | Saul Samuel | |
| Alexander McArthur | Edward Sayers | |
| George Oakes | William Wild | |
| John Richardson | | |
| John Robertson | | |
| Henry Rotton | | |
| Alexander Scott | | |
| Elias Weekes | | |

== See also ==
- Members of the New South Wales Legislative Assembly, 1859–1860
- Candidates of the 1859 New South Wales colonial election
