= Electoral results for the district of East Sydney =

Results for state seat of East Sydney, New South Wales, Australia

East Sydney, an electoral district of the Legislative Assembly in the Australian state of New South Wales was created in 1859 and abolished in 1894.

Election	Member	Party	Member	Party	Member	Party	Member	Party
1859	Charles Cowper	None	John Black	None	Henry Parkes	None	James Martin	None
1859 by	Charles Cowper	None	John Black	None	Henry Parkes	None	James Martin	None
1860 by	Peter Faucett	None	John Black	None	Henry Parkes	None	James Martin	None
1860	Charles Cowper	None	Robert Stewart	None	Henry Parkes	None	John Caldwell	None
1861 by	Charles Cowper	None	Robert Stewart	None	William Forster	None	John Caldwell	None
1864-65	Charles Cowper	None	James Hart	None	James Neale	None	John Caldwell	None
1865 by	Charles Cowper	None	James Hart	None	James Neale	None	John Caldwell	None
1866 by	Charles Cowper	None	James Hart	None	James Neale	None	Robert Stewart	None
1867 by	Marshall Burdekin	None	James Hart	None	James Neale	None	Robert Stewart	None
1869-70	George King	None	David Buchanan	None	Henry Parkes	None	James Martin	None
1870 by	George King	None	David Buchanan	None	Bowie Wilson	None	James Martin	None
1872	James Neale	None	Saul Samuel	None	Henry Parkes	None	John Macintosh	None
May 1872 by	James Neale	None	Saul Samuel	None	Henry Parkes	None	John Macintosh	None
June 1872 by	James Neale	None	George Oakes	None	Henry Parkes	None	John Macintosh	None
1874 by	Charles Moore	None	George Oakes	None	Henry Parkes	None	John Macintosh	None
1874-75	John Davies	None	Alexander Stuart	None	Henry Parkes	None	John Macintosh	None
1877 by	John Davies	None	Alexander Stuart	None	Henry Parkes	None	John Macintosh	None
1877	John Davies	None	Alexander Stuart	None	James Greenwood	None	John Macintosh	None
1879 by	John Davies	None	Arthur Renwick	None	James Greenwood	None	John Macintosh	None
1880	George Reid	None	Arthur Renwick	None	Henry Parkes	None	Henry Dangar	None
1882	George Reid	None	Edmund Barton	None	John McElhone	None	George Griffiths	None
1883 by 1	George Reid	None	Edmund Barton	None	John McElhone	None	George Griffiths	None
1883 by 2	George Reid	None	Edmund Barton	None	Henry Copeland	None	George Griffiths	None
1884 by	Sydney Burdekin	None	Edmund Barton	None	Henry Copeland	None	George Griffiths	None
1885	Sydney Burdekin	None	Edmund Barton	None	Henry Copeland	None	George Reid	None
1887	Sydney Burdekin	Free Trade	John Street	Free Trade	William McMillan	Free Trade	George Reid	Free Trade
1889	Sydney Burdekin	Free Trade	John Street	Free Trade	William McMillan	Free Trade	George Reid	Free Trade
April 1891 by	Sydney Burdekin	Free Trade	Walter Bradley	Protectionist	William McMillan	Free Trade	George Reid	Free Trade
1891	Varney Parkes	Free Trade	Edmund Barton	Protectionist	William McMillan	Free Trade	George Reid	Ind. Free Trade (Note: George Reid was estranged from Henry Parkes, who retired as leader of the Free Trade Party after the election and Reid was elected leader of the opposition in his place.)
November 1891 by	Varney Parkes	Free Trade	Edmund Barton	Protectionist	William McMillan	Free Trade	George Reid	Free Trade

== Election results ==
=== Elections in the 1890s ===
==== November 1891 by-election ====
1891 East Sydney by-election Saturday 7 November
Party	Candidate	Votes	%	±%
Protectionist	Edmund Barton (re-elected)	2,778	71.4	
Labour	William Grantham	1,112	28.6	
Total formal votes		3,890	99.6	
Informal votes		17	0.4	
Turnout		3,907	38.9	
Protectionist hold				

Edmund Barton (Protectionist) was appointed Attorney General in the third Dibbs ministry.

==== 1891 ====
1891 New South Wales colonial election: East Sydney Wednesday 17 June
Party	Candidate	Votes	%	±%
Free Trade	William McMillan (re-elected 1)	3,713	19.2	
Protectionist	Edmund Barton (elected 2)	3,535	18.3	
Free Trade	Varney Parkes (elected 3)	3,343	17.3	
Ind. Free Trade	George Reid (re-elected 4)	2,946	15.2	
Protectionist	William Manning	2,260	11.7	
Labour	William Grantham	2,241	11.6	
Protectionist	Walter Bradley	1,328	6.9	
Total formal votes		19,366	99.7	
Informal votes		65	0.3	
Turnout		6,475	64.5	
Free Trade hold 2				
Protectionist hold 1				
Member changed to Ind. Free Trade from Free Trade				

Walter Bradley (Protectionist) won a seat at the 1891 East Sydney by-election and Edmund Barton (Protectionist) held it at this election. George Reid whilst a Free Trader, did not support the Free Trade government of Sir Henry Parkes.

==== April 1891 by-election ====
1891 East Sydney by-election Tuesday 14 April
Party	Candidate	Votes	%	±%
Protectionist	Walter Bradley (elected)	1,502	37.3	
Free Trade	Edward Pulsford	1,332	33.1	
Independent Labour	Francis Cotton	1,188	29.6	
Total formal votes		4,022	98.6	
Informal votes		55	1.4	
Turnout		4,077	40.6	
Protectionist gain from Free Trade				

John Street (Free Trade) died.

=== Elections in the 1880s ===
==== 1889 ====
1889 New South Wales colonial election: East Sydney Saturday 2 February
Party	Candidate	Votes	%	±%
Free Trade	Sydney Burdekin (elected 1)	3,894	20.1	
Free Trade	George Reid (elected 2)	3,631	18.7	
Free Trade	William McMillan (elected 3)	3,604	18.6	
Free Trade	John Street (elected 4)	3,402	17.5	
Protectionist	Joseph Abbott	2,503	12.9	
Protectionist	Thomas O'Mara	2,378	12.3	
Total formal votes		19,412	99.8	
Informal votes		33	0.2	
Turnout		6,647	61.0	
Free Trade hold 4				

Joseph Abbott was nominated for both East Sydney and Wentworth, however he was elected unopposed for Wentworth before the poll for East Sydney.

==== 1887 ====
1887 New South Wales colonial election: East Sydney Saturday 5 February
Party	Candidate	Votes	%	±%
Free Trade	Sydney Burdekin (re-elected 1)	4,238	23.8	
Free Trade	George Reid (re-elected 2)	4,108	23.1	
Free Trade	William McMillan (elected 3)	4,025	22.6	
Free Trade	John Street (elected 4)	3,605	20.2	
Protectionist	William Traill	1,846	10.4	
Total formal votes		17,822	99.7	
Informal votes		63	0.4	
Turnout		6,883	63.2	

The two other sitting members Edmund Barton was appointed to the Legislative Council and Henry Copeland successfully contested New England.

==== 1885 ====
1885 New South Wales colonial election: East Sydney Friday 16 October
Candidate	Votes	%
Edmund Barton (re-elected 1)	3,903	22.0
George Reid (elected 2)	3,399	19.2
Henry Copeland (re-elected 3)	3,208	18.1
Sydney Burdekin (re-elected 4)	2,988	16.9
George Griffiths (defeated)	1,997	11.3
Samuel Lees	1,786	10.1
George Brown	435	2.5
Total formal votes	17,716	99.5
Informal votes	97	0.5
Turnout	6,917	67.6

==== 1884 by-election ====
1884 East Sydney by-election Friday 29 February
Candidate	Votes	%
Sydney Burdekin (elected)	2,138	50.5
George Reid (defeated)	2,098	49.5
Total formal votes	4,236	98.7
Informal votes	54	1.3
Turnout	4,290	48.1

The Committee of Elections and Qualifications held that an error in the drafting of the constitution meant that George Reid could not be validly appointed Minister of Public Instruction and declared his seat vacant.

==== 1883 by-election 2 ====
1883 East Sydney by-election Tuesday 23 January
Candidate	Votes	%
Henry Copeland (elected)	2,942	67.8
Arthur Renwick	1,397	32.2
Total formal votes	4,339	100.0
Informal votes	0	0.0
Turnout	4,339	53.9

John McElhone had also been elected to Upper Hunter and chose to resign from East Sydney.

==== 1883 by-election 1 ====
1883 East Sydney by-election Thursday 11 January
Candidate	Votes	%
George Reid (re-elected)	2,258	74.7
Albert Elkington	729	25.3
Total formal votes	2,887	99.2
Informal votes	24	0.8
Turnout	2,911	36.2

George Reid was appointed Minister of Public Instruction in the Stuart ministry.

==== 1882 ====
1882 New South Wales colonial election: East Sydney Thursday 30 November
Candidate	Votes	%
George Reid (re-elected 1)	3,044	20.2
Edmund Barton (re-elected 2)	2,948	19.6
George Griffiths (elected 3)	2,365	15.7
John McElhone (re-elected 4)	2,307	15.3
Sir Henry Parkes (defeated)	2,080	13.8
Arthur Renwick (defeated)	1,651	11.0
James Green	676	4.5
Total formal votes	15,071	99.7
Informal votes	53	0.4
Turnout	4,719	58.7

Edmund Barton was the member for Wellington and John McElhone was the member for Upper Hunter where he was re-elected. McElhone subsequently resigned from East Sydney causing a by-election. Sir Henry Parkes subsequently nominated for both St Leonards and then Tenterfield where he was elected unopposed. Parkes then withdrew from St Leonards.

==== 1880 ====
1880 New South Wales colonial election: East Sydney Wednesday 17 November
Candidate	Votes	%
George Reid (elected 1)	3,413	19.0
Arthur Renwick (re-elected 2)	3,295	18.3
Henry Dangar (elected 3)	3,102	17.3
Sir Henry Parkes (re-elected 4)	2,770	15.4
Charles Roberts	2,295	12.8
Samuel Lees	1,385	7.7
Charles Moore	1,216	6.8
Isaac Josephson	507	2.8
Total formal votes	17,983	99.3
Informal votes	120	0.7
Turnout	5,488	61.0

Of the sitting members, James Greenwood and John Macintosh did not contest the election and John Davies successfully contested South Sydney. Sir Henry Parkes was a sitting member for Canterbury.

=== Elections in the 1870s ===
==== 1879 by-election ====
1879 East Sydney by-election Wednesday 17 December
Candidate	Votes	%
Arthur Renwick (elected)	4,663	61.5
Robert Tooth	2,748	36.2
John Dowie	147	1.9
Thomas Dalveen	28	0.4
Total formal votes	7,586	98.9
Informal votes	82	1.1
Turnout	7,668	54.7

Alexander Stuart resigned.

==== 1877 ====
1877 New South Wales colonial election: East Sydney Wednesday 24 October
Candidate	Votes	%
John Macintosh (re-elected 1)	4,112	19.0
John Davies (re-elected 2)	3,761	17.4
James Greenwood (elected 3)	3,493	16.1
Alexander Stuart (re-elected 4)	2,930	13.5
Sir Henry Parkes (defeated)	2,843	13.1
Sedgwick Cowper	1,335	6.2
Francis Dixon	1,302	6.0
Isaac Josephson	1,029	4.8
Ninian Melville	540	2.5
Josiah Mason	173	0.8
William Cover	77	0.4
George Perry	60	0.3
Total formal votes	21,655	100.0
Informal votes	0	0.0
Turnout	7,156	54.1

==== 1877 by-election ====
1877 East Sydney by-election Tuesday 28 August
Candidate	Votes	%
John Davies (re-elected)	3,137	79.9
Ninian Melville	790	20.1
Total formal votes	3,927	98.5
Informal votes	60	1.5
Turnout	3,987	32.3 (Note: estimate based on an electoral roll of 12,326 at March 1877)

John Davies was appointed Postmaster-General in the fourth Robertson ministry.

==== 1874-75 ====
1874–75 New South Wales colonial election: East Sydney Wednesday 9 December 1874
Candidate	Votes	%
Henry Parkes (re-elected 1)	3,828	17.9
John Macintosh (re-elected 2)	3,651	17.1
Alexander Stuart (elected 3)	3,083	14.4
John Davies (elected 4)	2,394	11.2
Angus Cameron	2,189	10.3
Charles Moore (defeated)	1,960	9.2
William Forster (defeated)	1,502	7.0
John Young	1,140	5.3
Edward Flood	804	3.8
James Pemell	661	3.1
Daniel O'Connell	68	0.3
John Douglass	50	0.2
Nathaniel Pawsey	23	0.1
Total formal votes	21,353	100.0
Informal votes	0	0.0
Turnout	6,430	56.4

==== 1874 by-election ====
1874 East Sydney by-election Wednesday 15 July
Candidate	Votes	%
Charles Moore (elected)	2,385	74.1
John Douglass	813	25.2
William Cover	22	0.7
Total formal votes	3,220	100.0
Informal votes	0	0.0
Turnout	3,220	28.2

James Neale resigned.

==== June 1872 by-election ====
1872 East Sydney by-election Wednesday 12 June
Candidate	Votes	%
George Oakes (elected)	1,994	53.1
Bowie Wilson	1,763	46.9
Total formal votes	3,757	100.0
Informal votes	0	0.0
Turnout	3,757	33.7

Saul Samuel resigned to accept an appointment to the Legislative Council.

==== May 1872 by-election ====
1872 East Sydney by-election Wednesday 22 May
Candidate	Votes	%
Henry Parkes (re-elected)	2,686	68.8
James Jones	1,216	31.2
Total formal votes	3,902	100.0
Informal votes	0	0.0
Turnout	3,902	35.0

Henry Parkes was appointed Premier and Colonial Secretary, forming the first Parkes ministry.

==== 1872 ====
1872 New South Wales colonial election: East Sydney Tuesday 13 February
Candidate	Votes	%
Henry Parkes (re-elected 1)	3,270	17.0
John Macintosh (elected 2)	3,068	16.0
Saul Samuel (re-elected 3)	3,048	15.9
James Neale (re-elected 4)	2,663	13.9
James Martin (defeated)	2,073	10.8
David Buchanan (defeated)	1,739	9.1
Bowie Wilson (defeated)	1,730	9.0
William Barker	1,379	7.2
George King (defeated)	240	1.3
Total formal votes	19,210	100.0
Informal votes	0	0.0
Turnout	5,598	49.8

==== 1870 by-election ====
1870 East Sydney by-election Wednesday 23 February
Candidate	Votes	%
Bowie Wilson (elected)	2,755	55.8
William Campbell	2,183	44.2
Total formal votes	4,938	100.0
Informal votes	0	0.0
Turnout	4,938	48.6

Henry Parkes was also elected for Kiama and chose to resign from East Sydney.

=== Elections in the 1860s ===
==== 1869-70 ====
1869–70 New South Wales colonial election: East Sydney Friday 3 December 1869
Candidate	Votes	%
Henry Parkes (re-elected 1)	3,397	16.7
James Martin (re-elected 2)	3,158	15.6
David Buchanan (elected 3)	2,765	13.6
George King (elected 4)	2,702	13.3
Charles Cowper	2,548	12.6
Julian Salomons	2,106	10.4
James Neale (defeated)	2,071	10.2
Robert Hunt	742	3.7
Alexander Steel	699	3.4
William Cover	77	0.4
W Jennett	30	0.2
Total formal votes	20,295	100.0
Informal votes	0	0.0
Turnout	5,701	56.1

==== 1867 by-election ====
1867 East Sydney by-election Wednesday 20 March
Candidate	Votes	%
Marshall Burdekin (elected)	2,025	60.0
Walter Renny	1,350	40.0
Total formal votes	3,375	100.0
Informal votes	0	0.0
Turnout	3,375	38.9

Charles Cowper resigned due to financial difficulties.

==== 1866 by-election ====
1866 East Sydney by-election Friday 21 September
Candidate	Votes	%
Robert Stewart (elected)	unopposed	

John Caldwell resigned.

==== 1865 by-election ====
1865 East Sydney by-election Friday 17 February
Candidate	Votes	%
Charles Cowper (re-elected)	933	87.0
Frederick Birmingham	140	13.0
Total formal votes	1,073	100.0
Informal votes	0	0.0
Turnout	1,073	12.0

Charles Cowper had been appointed Premier and Colonial Secretary, forming the fourth Cowper ministry.

==== 1864-65 ====
1864–65 New South Wales colonial election: East Sydney Tuesday 22 November 1864
Candidate	Votes	%
Charles Cowper (re-elected 1)	2,711	18.7
John Caldwell (re-elected 2)	2,447	16.9
James Neale (elected 3)	2,107	14.6
James Hart (re-elected 4)	2,069	14.3
James Martin (defeated)	1,769	12.2
William Forster (defeated)	1,733	12.0
Robert Isaacs	1,351	9.3
Richard Dransfield	190	1.3
Thomas Duigan	43	0.3
William Cover	43	0.3
Total formal votes	14,463	100.0
Informal votes	0	0.0
Turnout	4,191	46.8

==== 1861 by-election ====
1861 East Sydney by-election Wednesday 29 May
Candidate	Votes	%
William Forster (elected)	1,273	48.7
James Neale	1,179	45.1
Charles Fowler	77	3.0
Thomas Duigan	56	2.1
James Martin	25	1.0
Thomas Argent	2	0.1
Total formal votes	2,612	100.0
Informal votes	0	0.0
Turnout	2,612	35.5

Henry Parkes resigned having accepted a government commission.

==== 1860 ====
1860 New South Wales colonial election: East Sydney Friday 7 December
Candidate	Votes	%
Charles Cowper (elected 1)	2,283	19.6
Henry Parkes (re-elected 2)	2,184	18.7
John Caldwell (elected 3)	2,091	17.9
Robert Stewart (elected 4)	1,925	16.5
James Martin (defeated)	1,551	13.3
Peter Faucett (defeated)	1,306	11.2
Thomas Duigan	327	2.8
Total formal votes	11,667	100.0
Informal votes	0	0.0
Turnout	3,771	48.4

==== 1860 by-election ====
1860 East Sydney by-election Thursday 10 November
Candidate	Votes	%
Peter Faucett (elected)	1,346	50.3
Robert Stewart	1,315	49.2
John West	14	0.5
Total formal votes	2,675	100.0
Informal votes	0	0.0
Turnout	2,675	30.0

Charles Cowper resigned for a second time, having been nominated without his consent.

=== Elections in the 1850s ===
==== 1859 by-election ====
1859 East Sydney by-election Thursday 10 November
Candidate	Votes	%
Charles Cowper (re-elected 1)	1,282	28.2
John Black (re-elected 2)	1,237	27.2
Peter Faucett	1,000	22.0
Richard Driver	969	21.3
Thomas Duigan	56	1.2
Total formal votes	4,544	100.0
Informal votes	0	0.0
Turnout	2,272	30.0

Charles Cowper resigned and John Black was appointed Secretary for Lands.

==== 1859 ====
1859 New South Wales colonial election: East Sydney Thursday 9 June
Candidate	Votes	%
Charles Cowper (re-elected 1)	2,064	20.0
John Black (elected 2)	1,682	16.3
Henry Parkes (elected 3)	1,654	16.0
James Martin (re-elected 4)	1,349	13.1
Charles Kemp	1,317	12.7
Richard Driver	1,201	11.6
William Allen	569	5.5
William Wentworth	300	2.9
William Benbow	205	2.0
Total formal votes	10,341	100.0
Informal votes	0	0.0
Turnout	3,436	45.4
