= 1861 East Sydney colonial by-election =

By-election in New South Wales, Australia

A by-election was held for the New South Wales Legislative Assembly electorate of East Sydney on 29 May 1861 because Henry Parkes had resigned having accepted a government commission with a salary of £1,000 to travel to England to lecture on immigration with William Bede Dalley.

== Dates ==
Date	Event
13 May 1861	Henry Parkes resigned.
14 May 1861	Writ of election issued by the Speaker of the Legislative Assembly.
27 May 1861	Nominations
29 May 1861	Polling day
1 June 1861	Return of writ

== Result ==
1861 East Sydney by-election Wednesday 29 May
Candidate	Votes	%
William Forster (elected)	1,273	48.7
James Neale	1,179	45.1
Charles Fowler	77	3.0
Thomas Duigan	56	2.1
James Martin	25	1.0
Thomas Argent	2	0.1
Total formal votes	2,612	100.0
Informal votes	0	0.0
Turnout	2,612	35.5

== See also ==
- Electoral results for the district of East Sydney
- List of New South Wales state by-elections
