= 1866 East Sydney colonial by-election =

By-election in New South Wales, Australia

A by-election was held for the New South Wales Legislative Assembly electorate of East Sydney on 17 February 1866 because of the resignation of John Caldwell.

== Dates ==
Date	Event
13 September 1866	John Caldwell resigned.
13 September 1866	Writ of election issued by the Speaker of the Legislative Assembly.
21 September 1866	Nominations
24 September 1866	Polling day
28 September 1866	Return of writ

== Result ==
1866 East Sydney by-election Friday 21 September
Candidate	Votes	%
Robert Stewart (elected)	unopposed	

== See also ==
- Electoral results for the district of East Sydney
- List of New South Wales state by-elections
