= 1879 East Sydney colonial by-election =

By-election in New South Wales, Australia

A by-election was held for the New South Wales Legislative Assembly electorate of East Sydney on 15 July 1879 because Alexander Stuart resigned. Stuart had been appointed agent-general however he was unable to take up the position due to financial difficulties.

== Dates ==
Date	Event
25 November 1879	Alexander Stuart resigned.
26 November 1879	Writ of election issued by the Speaker of the Legislative Assembly.
15 December 1879	Nominations
17 December 1879	Polling day
23 December 1879	Return of writ

== Result ==
1879 East Sydney by-election Wednesday 17 December
Candidate	Votes	%
Arthur Renwick (elected)	4,663	61.5
Robert Tooth	2,748	36.2
John Dowie	147	1.9
Thomas Dalveen	28	0.4
Total formal votes	7,586	98.9
Informal votes	82	1.1
Turnout	7,668	54.7

== See also ==
- Electoral results for the district of East Sydney
- List of New South Wales state by-elections
