= 1891 East Sydney colonial by-election =

1891 East Sydney colonial by-election may refer to

- 1891 East Sydney colonial by-election 1 held on 14 April 1891
- 1891 East Sydney colonial by-election 2 held on 7 November 1891

== See also ==
- List of New South Wales state by-elections
