= 1874 East Sydney colonial by-election =

By-election in New South Wales, Australia

A by-election was held for the New South Wales Legislative Assembly electorate of East Sydney on 15 July 1874 because James Neale resigned.

== Dates ==
Date	Event
25 June 1874	James Neale resigned.
26 June 1874	Writ of election issued by the Speaker of the Legislative Assembly.
13 July 1874	Nominations
15 July 1874	Polling day
31 July 1874	Return of writ

== Result ==
1874 East Sydney by-election Wednesday 15 July
Candidate	Votes	%
Charles Moore (elected)	2,385	74.1
John Douglass	813	25.2
William Cover	22	0.7
Total formal votes	3,220	100.0
Informal votes	0	0.0
Turnout	3,220	28.2

== See also ==
- Electoral results for the district of East Sydney
- List of New South Wales state by-elections
