= June 1872 East Sydney colonial by-election =

By-election in New South Wales, Australia

A by-election was held for the New South Wales Legislative Assembly electorate of East Sydney on 12 June 1872 because Saul Samuel resigned to accept an appointment to the Legislative Council.

== Dates ==
Date	Event
4 June 1872	Saul Samuel resigned.
5 June 1872	Writ of election issued by the Speaker of the Legislative Assembly.
10 June 1872	Nominations
12 June 1872	Polling day
18 June 1872	Return of writ

== Result ==
1872 East Sydney by-election Wednesday 12 June
Candidate	Votes	%
George Oakes (elected)	1,994	53.1
Bowie Wilson	1,763	46.9
Total formal votes	3,757	100.0
Informal votes	0	0.0
Turnout	3,757	33.7

== See also ==
- Electoral results for the district of East Sydney
- List of New South Wales state by-elections
