= George King (Australian politician) =

Australian politician

The Hon George King
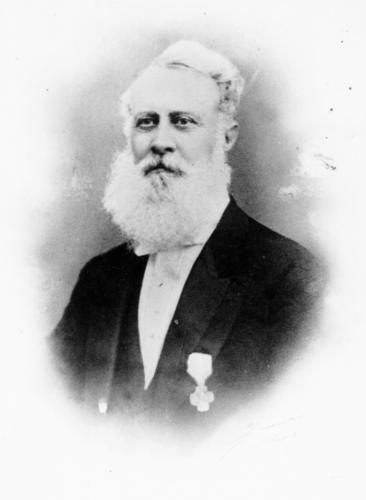

Member of the Queensland Legislative Council
- In office 26 January 1882 – 23 March 1890

Personal details
- Born: George King; 21 December 1814 Riga, Russia
- Died: 22 June 1894 (aged 79) Toowoomba, Queensland, Australia
- Resting place: Drayton and Toowoomba Cemetery
- Spouse: Jane Creighton (m.1839 d.1896)
- Relations: Robert King (son)
- Occupation: Company director

George King (21 December 1814 – 22 June 1894), was a merchant, pastoralist and politician in colonial Australia, a member of the New South Wales Legislative Assembly 1869 to 1872 and of the Queensland Legislative Council 1882 to 1890.

King was born in Riga, Russia (now in Latvia), his father, Robert King, was a partner in the Baltic firm of Balfour & Co., of Riga. George received his education and mercantile training in London and in Europe.

King emigrated to Australia in July 1839, and settled in Sydney, where he was a director of the Australian Trust Company, of the Commercial Banking Company of Sydney, and of the London Chartered Bank of Australia. He was for fifteen years chairman of the Australian Mutual Provident Society, for some time a member of the Board of Advice of the Australian Agricultural Company, and has acted as a director of the Clarence and Richmond River Steam Navigation Company, and Chairman of the Melbourne Marine Insurance Company.

King was elected a member of the New South Wales Legislative Assembly for East Sydney on 3 December 1869, and sat until 3 February 1872. King visited England in 1874, but returned and settled permanently in Queensland in the following year, being created a Knight of the Crown of Italy on his retirement from the Sydney consulship for Italy. In 1880 Mr. King accepted the Executive Commissionership for Queensland at the Melbourne International Exhibition, and represented the colony on the steel rails inquiry held in London in 1881. King was nominated to the Queensland Legislative Council on 26 January 1882, a position he held until resigning on 19 March 1890.

Survived by his wife, seven sons and three daughters, King died in Toowoomba, Queensland, on 22 June 1894 and was buried in Drayton and Toowoomba Cemetery. King's eldest son Robert John King represented the Electoral district of Paddington in the New South Wales Legislative Assembly from 1889 to 1891.

New South Wales Legislative Assembly
Preceded by Marshall Burdekin; James Hart; James Neale; Robert Stewart	Member for East Sydney; 1864–1869; With: David Buchanan; James Martin; Henry Parkes/Bowie Wilson	Succeeded by John Macintosh; James Neale; Henry Parkes; Saul Samuel
