= 1867 East Sydney colonial by-election =

By-election in New South Wales, Australia

A by-election was held for the New South Wales Legislative Assembly electorate of East Sydney on 20 March 1867 because Charles Cowper resigned due to financial difficulties.

== Dates ==
Date	Event
23 February 1867	Charles Cowper resigned.
1 March 1867	Writ of election issued by the Speaker of the Legislative Assembly.
18 March 1867	Nominations
20 March 1867	Polling day
25 March 1867	Return of writ

== Result ==
1867 East Sydney by-election Wednesday 20 March
Candidate	Votes	%
Marshall Burdekin (elected)	2,025	60.0
Walter Renny	1,350	40.0
Total formal votes	3,375	100.0
Informal votes	0	0.0
Turnout	3,375	38.9

== See also ==
- Electoral results for the district of East Sydney
- List of New South Wales state by-elections
