= April 1891 East Sydney colonial by-election =

By-election in New South Wales, Australia

A by-election was held for the New South Wales Legislative Assembly electorate of East Sydney, Australia on 14 April 1891 because of the death of John Street (Free Trade).

== Dates ==
Date	Event
23 March 1891	John Street died.
31 March 1891	Writ of election issued by the Speaker of the Legislative Assembly.
10 April 1891	Nominations
14 April 1891	Polling day
21 April 1891	Return of writ

== Result ==
1891 East Sydney by-election Tuesday 14 April
Party	Candidate	Votes	%	±%
Protectionist	Walter Bradley (elected)	1,502	37.3	
Free Trade	Edward Pulsford	1,332	33.1	
Independent Labour	Francis Cotton	1,188	29.6	
Total formal votes		4,022	98.6	
Informal votes		55	1.4	
Turnout		4,077	40.6	
Protectionist gain from Free Trade				

== See also ==
- Electoral results for the district of East Sydney
- List of New South Wales state by-elections
