= 1870 East Sydney colonial by-election =

By-election in New South Wales, Australia

A by-election was held for the New South Wales Legislative Assembly electorate of East Sydney on 23 February 1870 because Henry Parkes had also been elected to Kiama and chose to resign from East Sydney.

== Dates ==
| Date | Event |
|---|---|
| 15 February 1870 | Henry Parkes resigned. |
| 15 February 1870 | Writ of election issued by the Speaker of the Legislative Assembly. |
| 21 February 1870 | Nominations |
| 23 February 1870 | Polling day |
| 28 February 1870 | Return of writ |

== Result ==
1870 East Sydney by-election Wednesday 23 February
| Candidate | Votes | % |
|---|---|---|
| Bowie Wilson (elected) | 2,755 | 55.8 |
| William Campbell | 2,183 | 44.2 |
| Total formal votes | 4,938 | 100.0 |
| Informal votes | 0 | 0.0 |
| Turnout | 4,938 | 48.6 |

== See also ==
- Electoral results for the district of East Sydney
- List of New South Wales state by-elections
