= James Greenwood (Australian politician) =

Australian politician (1838–1882)

James Greenwood (25 August 1838 – 6 November 1882) was an English-born Australian politician.

Greenwood was born at Stansfield near Todmorden, West Yorkshire to Richard and Betty Greenwood. He studied at the University of London, receiving a Master of Arts in theology, philosophy and economics in 1866. John Clifford the Baptist Nonconformist minister and politician was a contemporary. On 26 June 1866 he married Mary Anne Wallis Ward; they had seven children, of whom four survived to adulthood.

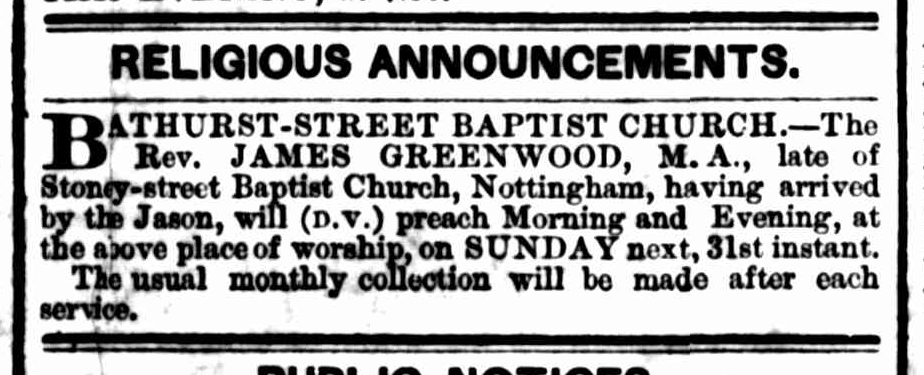
Notice of Greenwood's arrival in Sydney

== Baptist pastor 1867–1876 ==
In 1867 Greenwood became pastor at the Stoney Street Baptist Church, Nottingham.

Greenwood migrated to Sydney to take up the position of pastor at the Bathurst Street Baptist Church in Sydney, arriving on the Jason on 25 July 1870. He succeeded the Rev James Voller in the parish, as director of the Baptist Training College (1871) and in the residency of the Baptist Union of NSW.

From 1836 to 1938, the Bathurst Street Baptist church was on the northeast corner of Kent and Bathurst Street, where today stands Council House. In 1938, the church moved to its current location at 619 George Street.

In this role he celebrated the marriage of Captain Joshua Slocum and Virginia Walker on 31 January 1871.

In 1874, on a trip to Melbourne, he met Charles Clark and Charles Bright. Clark was a popular pastor at the Baptist church in Albert Street East Melbourne. Clark would go on to resign his ministry for a lucrative career as a public speaker, establishing that profession in Australia. Bright, the sometime editor of Melbourne Punch, moved on to be aspirant politician, campaigning journalist, education reformer and Free thinker. In several ways, Greenwood's own career would, with less success, follow these paths.

In 1875, Greenwood returned to Melbourne to preach at the Albert Street Baptist church where his sermons were listened to with 'great attention'.

The Sydney congregation became uncomfortable with their pastor's involvement in the emerging campaign over State education and requested he choose the campaign or the ministry. Greenwood was also uncomfortable. After his death, the papers reported that he had begun to doubt his calling and he left the ministry with the intention of studying for the Bar, but was diverted from that course by the education campaign and his election to Parliament.

In 1876, he published his 3 valedictory sermons at sixpence each – The damned City's last warning, All for the best, and Commercial morality – under the title Sermons for the People. His aim he wrote was to impress the leading Christian truths and duties on the minds of his fellow citizens. He retired from his ministry at the end of July 1876.

== Journalist & researcher ==
While still a pastor, Greenwood had begun to write for the Sydney Morning Herald and the Echo.

This was the era before the byline credited the journalist, so it is difficult to identify articles by Greenwood. However, the Northern Star in Lismore referenced an article in the Sydney Morning Herald on Victorian educational progress ‘which some would at once attribute to his pen’.

This article ranged across the capital expenditure of the Victorian Government on State school buildings, the cost of some schools, the cost per pupil served (£5 per head), the school population, the transition from leased to owned schools, the number of acceptable quality school buildings in NSW, comparative attendance as a proportion of population, the amount that NSW would need to set aside to emulate Victoria, and the slow release of funds for schools in NSW (as opposed to the funding made available for roads).

The content of the 3 May article matches the newspaper reports of Greenwood's education campaign speeches and is consistent with the assessment of his obituary writers.

The Mail described him as an expert in all social and political subjects that could be represented by figures with no rival in the Colonies. They said he had a special gift for statistics and for getting the meaning out of figures. He watched eagerly for the appearance of public documents, which he studied with patient enthusiasm, and compelled them to yield fresh and valuable results to the political thought of the country.

‘Statistical returns of any kind had meanings for him that few other eyes discerned. Ministers and heads of departments feared the consummate skill and untiring energy which he brought to bear upon their reports. The banking corporations had in him the most competent critic they had yet encountered. Some of his statistical articles were revelations to many of those who read them. So he helped to educate many of our politicians. Protectionists, land monopolists, surplus-treasurers, and other jugglers with figures, had their carefully constructed balloons fatally pricked by his sharp and watchful pen.’

It was also said that many of the statistical returns issued by the Government had been greatly improved following his suggestions and that the inaugural role of Government statist would have been offered to him if he had wanted it.

Greenwood's public opponents claimed he was more than just a journalist on the staff of the SMH. The proposed Illawarra Railway was a campaign issue when Greenwood stood in the election of 1877. The Illawarra Mercury asserted 'Mr. Greenwood is intimately connected with the Sydney Morning Herald, if not at the very head of its editorial staff. On all occasions, and in every possible way, the Herald has opposed the Illawarra Railway, and will probably do so to the end, and if it should transpire that Mr. Greenwood will support the project while he is connected with that paper, it will be a matter for general surprise, and will greatly add to the high estimation in which he is now held by the people of this colony as a public man.'

In the 1882 electoral confrontation between Sir John Robertson and Greenwood over the seat of Mudgee, Robertson claimed that it was Greenwood's patrons at the SMH who had promised to bankroll Greenwood's campaign and that it was because the paper had withdrawn the promise of funding that Greenwood had to withdraw from the campaign ignominiously.

That there might be something to these claims is suggested by the presence in the small group at Greenwood's funeral of the editor of the SMH Dr. Andrew Garran, (Editor 1873–1885) and Mr. E. Lewis Scott, the paper's dramatic and musical critic.

At least one article appeared under Greenwood's name – The Equality of the Sexes. In which he argued for greater (though not complete) equality, opposing the views in Sir William Hamilton's Metaphysics and referencing John Stuart Mill.

Must we for ever go on educating our daughters with no other hope but that in time somebody will come to marry them ? What a degradation of woman to make that her only prospect in life 1 Why not multiply the avenues of feminine industry and give our daughters as good chances of independence as our sons ? There is no need to make them rivals in the avocations of life, because nature has given them certain distinctive adaptations^; but, whatever a woman can do as well as a man, there is no reason in nature, and there ought to be no reason in social life, why she should not be as free as a man to do it.

In the words of the Sydney Morning Herald. 'He was a man of great breadth and variety of knowledge, of extensive reading and patient research, and of scholarly tastes.'

== Secular education campaigner 1874–1877 ==
While pastor Greenwood became a prominent campaigner for National, Secular, Compulsory and Free education under the banner of the Public School League.

In NSW at that time many young people did not receive an education and most of those who were eduacated passed through the denominational schools (Anglican and Catholic). Fee-paying Government schools had been introduced in 1848. In 1866, Henry Parkes, then a Minister in the Martin Government introduced a Public Schools Act that placed denominational schools under State oversight. The 1866 Act sought through other measures, to stimulate the extension of government schooling to unserved areas. In this system, attendance was at the parent's discretion and government schools charged fees and were required to be self-supporting. The less well wealthy denominations such as Congregationalists and Baptists could not afford to establish their own denominational schools and the poor could not afford the fees. Nor did all parents permit their children to attend school.

The alternative model for which Greenwood and others campaigned was in operation in other parts of the world including Queensland and Victoria which in 1872, established a centralised model based on the principles of free, secular, and compulsory education.

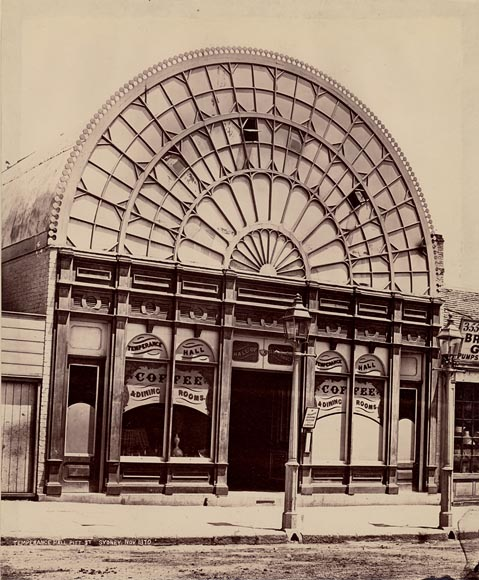
The New Temperance Hall Pitt Street, Sydney

On 18 June 1874, the educational reformers held their first meeting in the New Temperance Hall, on Pitt Street. (The Hall was directly opposite the Independent chapel, today the Pitt Street Uniting Church.) The meeting was chaired by the Mayor Stephen Goold. Greenwood, the main speaker, proposed the establishment of what became the New South Wales Public School League, for the advocacy of a national [NSW] system of education – secular, compulsory, and free. Greenwood called the current system a ‘cumbrous, uncertain, compromising, and controversy-creating system’ and said ‘what was wanted was a system of education which should reach every home in the country, a system at the lowest cost which should be fair and just to the school teachers, a system which should be impartially just to all sections of the community.'

There was a further preliminary meeting on 9 July again at the Temperance Hall. Of the 42 attendees whose names were recorded at that meeting, 3 held local government office, several were JPs or doctors and 15 were clergy. Greenwood spoke again, providing data on the schools systems in Queensland and the USA. He said in NSW ‘ 25,000 children [are] beyond the reach of our present educational appliances. Whoever had studied the matter must be convinced that this was the class most needing to be reached, and yet the class which would never be touched unless our system was made both compulsory and free’

On 17 August 1874 The League was formally established at a meeting at the Masonic Hall, 102 York Street. (The Masonic Hall occupied the old Town Hall opposite what today is the Queen Victoria Building). Greenwood spoke at length moving the first motion. 'That this meeting regards it as the duty of the State to secure a system of education for its people that shall be adequate, equitable, and available for all the children in the land.' He took his seat to prolonged and enthusiastic cheering. The motion was seconded by Rev Dr Barry who said we look to Greenwood as our leader in this matter. ‘The manner, in which he has mastered every detail, the labour with which he has got up his figures and his facts, and the admirable skill with which he has so disciplined and arrayed them are worthy of all praise.’

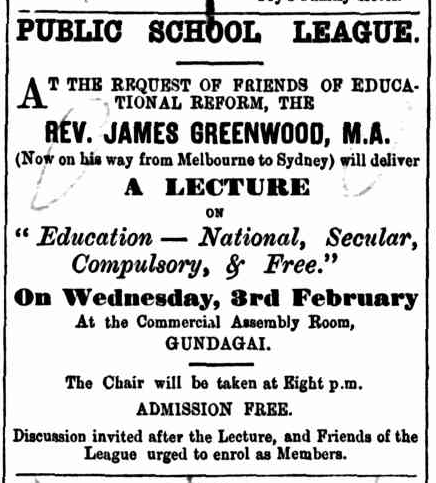
Gundagai meeting of Public School League 3 February 1875

In the words of the Argus, Greenwood burst into political life as the great platform speaker and champion of the League. Greenwood's leadership was recognised by Joseph Paxton a wealthy gold miner turned philanthropist led a group that offered to fund his election campaign and provide him with a salary of £800 a-year, if he stood for Parliament. Greenwood declined as his church had told him that he would need to resign his ministry if he entered Parliament. Not all impressions were positive. One observer described Greenwood as a fluent speaker, but weak in voice, and lacking animation and the faculty of emphasising and pressing home his arguments.

In 1875, returning to Sydney overland from his month at the Albert Street Baptist Church in Melbourne, Greenwood spoke at a public meeting at Fry's Hotel in Gundagai. Reports of this lecture prompted a self-described Catholic to write ‘As well expect that persons should pay attention to the mad ravings of a Socialist, or Communist, or common Highwayman as listen to the twaddle of the Rev. Mr. Greenwood’

Later in the year Parkes spoke in support of the 1866 Education Act and was rebutted by Greenwood in a 3,500 word article in the Sydney Morning Herald.

In 1876 the Government brought forward an amendment to the 1866 Act. The League responded at a public meeting on 2 March 1876 at the Masonic Hall chaired by Paxton. Greenwood was on the bill but did not attend as he had not yet fulfilled his notice at his parish. William Pigott stood in for Greenwood as first speaker. The paper reported Pigott called Greenwood: the champion of the League (Cheers), described him as someone who had fought well for its principles (hear, hear) and regretted that Greenwood was not there to move the first resolution and to lay before them a general case on behalf of the League.(Cheers.)

On 21 March 1877, the Robertson Government fell. Earlier on 11 March 1877, a meeting of the League was held in Newcastle. A telegram from Mr. Greenwood, was read, and cheered. 'Cannot come to night. Parkes likely to form a strong Government. He will consent to some education system, but not ours. We shall have to keep on for some time longer. We shall win finally, for no system is preferable that falls short of ours.'

As it turned out the Parkes Government only lasted a few months and elections were held in August of that year, elections at which Greenwood was himself a candidate.

== Candidate in the 1877 election ==
Parliamentary politics in NSW in the 1870s had ‘drifted into chaos’. This was a time before formal political parties, and MPs formed and reformed fluid short-term coalitions that elevated to Premier, either the devious faction leaders Parkes and Robertson or a compromise candidate. Interventions by Robinson the Governor also triggered elections.

1877 began with Robertson as Premier. In March he was succeeded by Parkes, who was replaced by Robertson in August. The Robertson government fell in October and a general election was held. It was for this election and in this inflamed context that Greenwood announced his candidacy for the multi-member electorate of East Sydney.

Fun was made of Greenwood's self-importance and his calls to purify political life. 'Great things are expected from the Rev. Mr. Greenwood MP for the S M [Sydney Morning] Herald no I mean for East Sydney. He is a hard worker and a long-headed thinker, and possesses undeniably the gift of the gab – but he 'blows' [bloviates] more 'blowingly' than a dozen native-born Australians rolled into one.'

The Argus in Melbourne called him the most interesting among the new candidates and predicted he would be troublesome to those who disagreed with him including Sir John Robertson, Mr. Garrett and the Ministry who will ‘do the utmost to defeat him’. (Garrett was Minister for Lands and had been accused of bribery and insobriety.)

Although he was ‘the life and soul of the Public Schools League’, Greenwood did not stand as a single-issue candidate which surprised some. In a three-hour address at the Temperance Hall on 17 October in which ‘some of the speaker's remarks were somewhat humorous and were greeted with continuous laughter and cheers.’ Greenwood laid out his policies beyond education. He said he stood for (in today's terms) good governance and criticised those who clung to place without power (such as Parkes) and those who collided with the Crown (such as Robertson for his clashes with the Governor). He wanted to expand the franchise beyond the owners of freehold property. He did not support salaries for elected members. (Only Ministers were paid at this time and both Parkes and Robertson sought to hold office to remain solvent.) He favoured reform of the land auctions and land laws that applied to the competing squatters and free selectors. He was in favour of free trade and against incentives for new industries. He said he would support the construction of a railway to the Illawarra if the projected revenues were sufficient.

=== Nominations ===
Nominations for the election were held on 22 October 1877 in Hyde Park where ten thousand people gathered in front of the hustings. Greenwood was nominated by John Woods and seconded by Walter Buzacott. In his nomination speech, Greenwood restated his ‘good governance’ position, said he was in favour of subsidising immigration through the proceeds of land sales, of State subsidies to the city of Sydney and the railways and the sewerage and water schemes of William Clark (which included the Bondi sewer outfall, and the Nepean Reservoir.)

=== Election ===
The show of hands for the nominated candidates at the hustings endorsed Parkes, Greenwood, Davies, and Dixon. At the poll some days later, Macintosh, Davies, Greenwood, and Stuart were returned, shutting out Parkes. Robertson lost his seat in West Sydney. (Parkes was returned to Parliament by the electorate of Canterbury. Robertson was returned for Mudgee. At that time elections took place over several days and were held at different times in different electorates allowing a candidate defeated in one electorate to run for another seat.)

== Member of Parliament ==
Following the election, Parkes sought to form a Government and sounded out Stuart, before asking Davies, then Greenwood if they would serve as Treasurer. All declined. Eventually Farnell formed a Ministry that lasted until the end of 1878.

On 12 February 1878, when Greenwood (who one observer said received, and deserved, the most attention of any new member) brought forward a resolution that schools should be free, secular and compulsory he was received with cheers from all sides of the house. The resolution aimed to replace the incumbent denominational system. Leary, the Minister for Education replied that the Government had received £60,000 in fees, paid without complaint and that denominational schools were equally effective as public schools. Parkes headed off the confrontation by sending the issue to a committee.

This was, in hindsight, the peak of Greenwood's Parliamentary career and as an advocate for public education. At the end of 1878, the old foes Parkes and Robertson formed a coalition that replaced the Farnell Government. The new Parkes Government passed the Public Instruction Act 1880 which contained most if not all the education campaigners and Greenwood had sought.

And so it was that one of Greenwood's 'most conspicuous opponents and merciless critics was the distinguished person [Parkes] who is now, by the very irony of fate, looked up to as the author of our educational system'.

Obituary writers recognised that as an MP he was very active, and perhaps more than any other member, went minutely into the subjects to which he gave his attention but judged his political career to be far from a success and disappointing. Wisely, one said he declined to seek re-election in 1880.

== Death ==
Greenwood died of an overdose of chlorodyne at the age of 44 at Paddington on 6 November 1882, survived by his wife and three children.

He is buried at Rookwood Cemetery.

The Mitchell Library holds records of his writing and speeches mostly related to his campaign to reform education.

New South Wales Legislative Assembly
Preceded by Henry Parkes	Member for East Sydney; 1877–1880; Served alongside: Davies, Macintosh, Stuart/Renwick	Succeeded by Henry Dangar; Henry Parkes; George Reid
