= Edward Pulsford =

Australian politician (1844–1919)

The Honourable Edward Pulsford
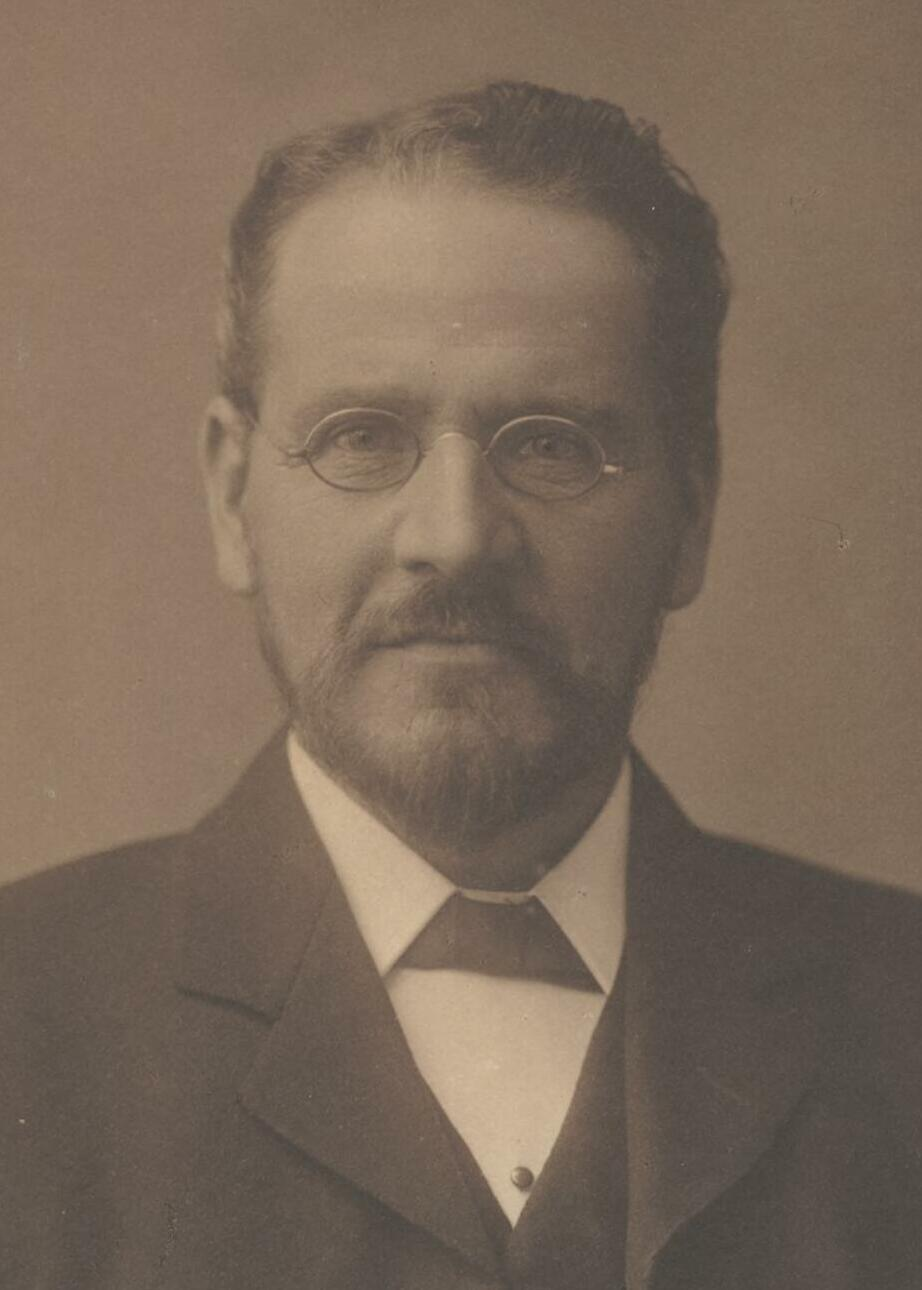
- Pulsford c. 1900s

Senator for New South Wales
- In office 29 March 1901 – 30 June 1910

Personal details
- Born: 29 September 1844 Burslem, Staffordshire, England
- Died: 29 September 1919 (aged 75) Chatswood, New South Wales
- Party: Free Trade (1901–06); Anti-Socialist (1906–09); Liberal (1909–10)
- Spouse(s): 1) Mary Charlotte Stainforth (1870–her death); 2) Blanche Elspeth Brown (1919–his death that year)
- Occupation: Journalist

Edward Pulsford (29 September 1844 – 29 September 1919) was an English-born Australian politician and free-trade campaigner.

Pulsford established a successful business with his father as commission agents in Yorkshire before moving his interests to New South Wales in 1883. There he became a vigorous campaigner for free trade, and was a co-founder of the Free Trade and Liberal Association in that colony, the body that would later become the machine behind the Free Trade Party. Although his attempts to enter the New South Wales Legislative Assembly were abortive, he was appointed to the Legislative Council in 1895 and served until 1901, when he was elected to the Senate. An uncompromising opponent of all forms of protectionism, following the 1909 Fusion of the anti-Labour forces he joined the Liberal Party only with reluctance.

Pulsford is also remembered for his avid opposition to the White Australia policy and other forms of racial discrimination. Whilst financial editor of the Daily Telegraph he attacked restrictive immigration laws, and he fought against the policy in the state parliament and later in the Senate, where he was one of the few to oppose the 1901 Immigration Restriction Act. This racial tolerance, combined with his opposition to women's suffrage, has led the economist John Hawkins to describe him as "probably the least racist but perhaps the most sexist member of the Australian Senate in its first decade".

== Early life ==
Edward Pulsford was born at Burslem in Staffordshire on 29 September 1844. His mother was Mary Ann, née Cutler, and his father, James Eustace Pulsford, was a Baptist minister and businessman. He received a private education and worked with his father as a commission agent; together they worked in Hull, Yorkshire, from 1870 to 1884. On 23 February 1870, he married Mary Charlotte Stainforth at Hull; she would predecease him. In 1883 Edward embarked for New South Wales, while his father travelled to New York to become resident secretary of the Liverpool, London & Globe Insurance Company. After his arrival in Sydney, Pulsford immediately became involved in the free trade cause, and in 1885 he co-founded the Free Trade and Liberal Association of New South Wales (FTLA, a forerunner of the Free Trade Party) with Bernhard Wise. His campaigning on behalf of free trade led to his becoming an honorary member of the Cobden Club.

== Colonial politics ==
From its foundation until 1891, Pulsford was secretary of the FTLA, and became an organiser and ferocious pamphleteer. He received a prize for an essay on "The Beneficial Influence of a Free Trade Policy upon the Colony of New South Wales", written as a contribution to the 1887 centennial edition of the Year-Book of Australia. He became actively involved in journalism as proprietor of the Armidale Chronicle and financial editor of the Daily Telegraph from 1890 to 1898. While focusing overwhelmingly on free trade, actively denigrating the neighbouring colony of Victoria's protectionist policies, he also worked on the compilation of an Australian biographical supplement to Webster's International Dictionary and supported Federation.

Pulsford was a leading proponent of the free-trade cause, although an intended candidacy for the New South Wales Legislative Assembly in 1891 did not eventuate. He had contested a by-election for East Sydney earlier that year, losing to protectionist candidate Walter Bradley. He was nevertheless nominated to the New South Wales Legislative Council in 1895 by the Free Trade Premier, George Reid. He continued his support of free trade policies, but differentiated himself from his colleagues by firmly opposing restrictions on Asian immigration. He had expressed regret concerning the fate of the Australian Aborigines in a Telegraph article in 1888 and also opposed Sir Henry Parkes's poll tax on the Chinese, and now opposed the continuing restrictive measures passed in 1896 and 1898. He served as president of the Australian Free Trade and Liberal Association's New South Wales branch in 1900 and was deputy president of the federal election campaign committee, standing himself for the Senate in New South Wales. Despite being remembered as an opponent of the White Australia Policy, during the federal election campaign he declared "Of course, I believe in a white Australia".

== Federal politics ==
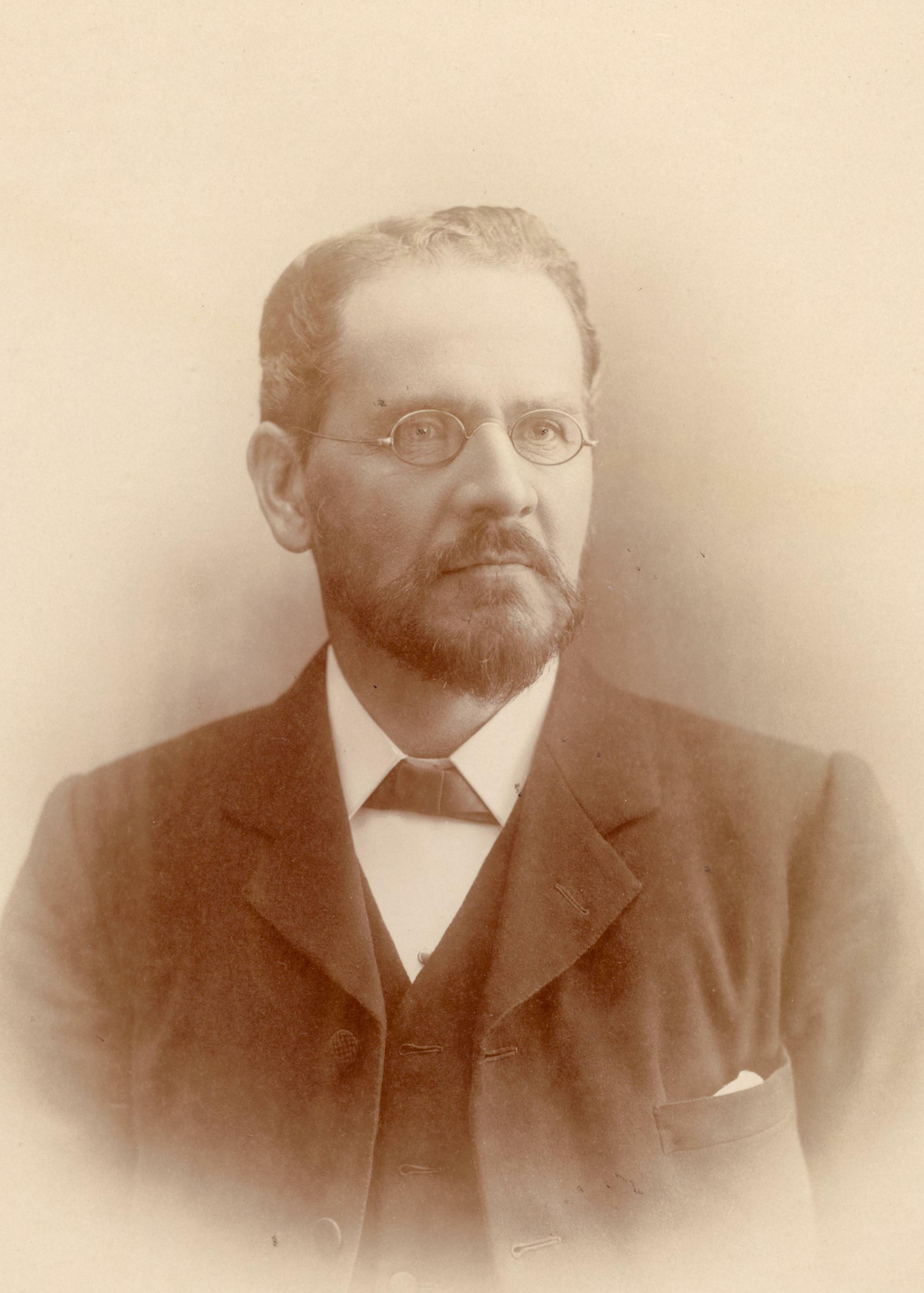
Pulsford as a senator

At the first federal election in March 1901, Pulsford was elected as a senator for New South Wales in the sixth and final position, narrowly defeating fellow Free Trade and Liberal candidate John Gray. He continued his undiscourageable support of free trade and was one of the few senators to oppose the White Australia policy, describing "the whole of the inhabitants of Asia as [his] friends". He opposed the 1901 Immigration Restriction Act, supported Asians' eligibility for the old-age pension, and decried the treatment of Kanaka labourers as "cattle". In his opposition to immigration restriction he highlighted the diplomatic insult to Japan and other Asian nations, and published a pamphlet in 1905 supporting the protestations of the Japanese government against the policy.

Pulsford spoke for five hours in the debate on the 1902 Customs Tariff Bill, although he later supported time limits for speeches. Missing out on a frontbench portfolio when the Free Traders were briefly in government from 1904 to 1905, he was absent from parliament for most of 1907. Described by the Tribune as "the best living authority on Australia's tariff question", his pamphlet to the Cobden Club in 1907 attracted a favourable reception. He opposed women's suffrage on the grounds that it would put Australia "in advance of public opinion throughout the world", believing it would lead to the "vulgarisation of women".

The Fusion in 1909 between the free trade and Protectionist parties to form the Liberal Party was difficult for Pulsford, who had "no faith in either the old Protection or the new Protection", and although he did join the new party, his support of any protectionist legislation would be "in order to show that all such legislation must be a failure". He was defeated at the 1910 election when the Labour Party won all the Senate seats in New South Wales.

== Later life ==
Pulsford continued his support for the free-trade cause outside Parliament, and in May 1914 planned to establish a free-trade paper to be circulated around Australia, New Zealand and South Africa, a scheme that was abandoned following the outbreak of World War I. He revised his book Commerce and the Empire (originally published in 1903) in 1917, arguing that free trade was central to the freedoms the Empire was fighting for, and calling for free trade with Germany after the war. On 2 March 1919 he married Blanche Elspeth Brown at Neutral Bay, but he died later that year on his 75th birthday, 29 September 1919. Survived by his second wife and the three sons of his first marriage, Pulsford was buried at Gore Hill Cemetery after an Anglican service.
