= Dibbs ministry (1891–1894) =

Third New South Wales government ministry led by George Dibbs

Third Dibbs ministry
- 27th Cabinet of the Colony of New South Wales

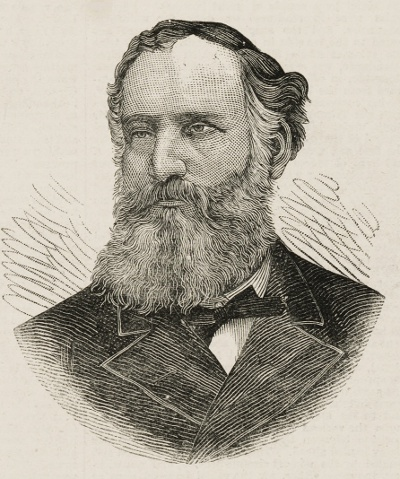
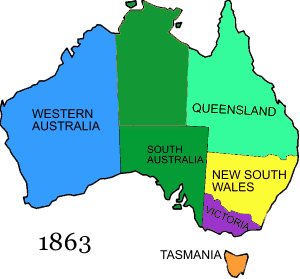
- Premier Sir George Dibbs and the Colony of New South Wales (1863–1900)
- Date formed: 23 October 1891
- Date dissolved: 2 August 1894

People and organisations
- Monarch: Queen Victoria
- Governor: The Earl of Jersey / Sir Robert Duff
- Premier: Sir George Dibbs
- No. of ministers: 10
- Member party: Protectionist Party
- Status in legislature: Minority government
- Opposition party: Free Trade Party
- Opposition leader: George Reid

History
- Predecessor: Fifth Parkes ministry
- Successor: Reid ministry

The third Dibbs ministry, the 27th ministry of the Colony of New South Wales, was led by Sir George Dibbs, leader of the Protectionist Party, following the 1891 New South Wales election, which saw the Labour Party win seats in the New South Wales Legislative Assembly and the balance of power. With no party having a majority, Sir Henry Parkes held on as Premier until October 1891 when he lost a vote in the Legislative Assembly, causing Parkes to resign as Premier and leader of the Free Trade Party. Dibbs formed the ministry on 23 October 1891, with Labour support, and comprised 10 ministers.

Dibbs was elected to the New South Wales Legislative Assembly in 1874 and served as Premier on three occasions. The title of Premier was widely used to refer to the Leader of Government, but was not a formal position in the government until 1920. Instead the Premier was appointed to another portfolio, usually Colonial Secretary. Dibbs took over as Premier on the first occasion in October 1885 following the resignation of Alexander Stuart due to ill-health, with his ministry lasting for 75 days. This was a period of great financial stress for the colony. Dibbs served as colonial secretary in the Jennings ministry, before it too suffered budgetary pressures. It was during this time that the party system was formed in New South Wales with Dibbs aligning himself with the Protectionist Party. His second term as premier lasted for just 49 days.

Federation was an emerging issue, with Dibbs supporting an initial customs union, but was a severe critic of the strong federalism promoted by Parkes and Barton. Despite their disagreement on federalism, Barton agreed to be Attorney General, based on an agreement that Barton was free to promote federalism and Dibbs would not obstruct discussion on federation in the Legislative Assembly.

Under the constitution, ministers in the Legislative Assembly were required to resign to recontest their seats in an election when appointed. Such ministerial by-elections were usually uncontested and on this occasion a by-election was required in East Sydney (Edmund Barton). Barton was comfortably re-elected while the other seven other ministers, Sir George Dibbs (The Murrumbidgee), Henry Copeland (New England), John Kidd (Camden), William Lyne (The Hume), John See (Grafton), Thomas Slattery (Boorowa) and Francis Suttor (Bathurst), were re-elected unopposed.

Dibbs visited London in 1892 and during his absence Edmund Barton was acting Premier, while Francis Suttor was acting Colonial Secretary. In January 1893 Sir Julian Salomons resigned from the ministry because he disagreed with several points of government policy.

Barton and Richard O'Connor, the Minister of Justice had been representing the plaintiff in the case of Proudfoot v the Railway Commissioners before taking office and retained the brief as they had the right to carry out private practice as barristers. Two years later the case still had not been resolved and in November 1893 they were questioned in parliament about whether it was proper for ministers to act against a government department. Barton and O'Connor returned the brief however Barton argued that the Railway Commissioners were not a government department and were not conducting their business through the Crown Law Office such that the ministers had the right in their professional practice, to appear against them in court. The government lost an adjournment motion on this point by 69 to 48 and both Barton and O'Connor resigned from the ministry. Charles Heydon was appointed Attorney General while Thomas Slattery was appointed Minister of Justice in addition to his duties as Secretary for Mines and Agriculture.

Dibbs treated the adjournment as a vote of censure, and persuaded Governor Robert Duff to prorogue parliament. The Legislative Assembly resumed in January until it was dissolved on 25 June 1894, and a general election was held on 27 July 1894, at which Dibb failed to carry the vote. Although he had lost control of the Assembly, Dibbs said he would not resign until after parliament had reconvened, but the Governor forced his hand. Dibbs sought the appointment of several persons by the Governor to the then fully appointed Legislative Council, which Duff refused to do, on the ground that the ministry had been condemned by the colony. In consequence, Dibbs and the ministers resigned on 2 August 1894.

The third Dibbs ministry was followed by the Reid ministry, led by George Reid, who had replaced Parkes as leader of the Free Trade Party. The new parliament opened on 7 August 1894.

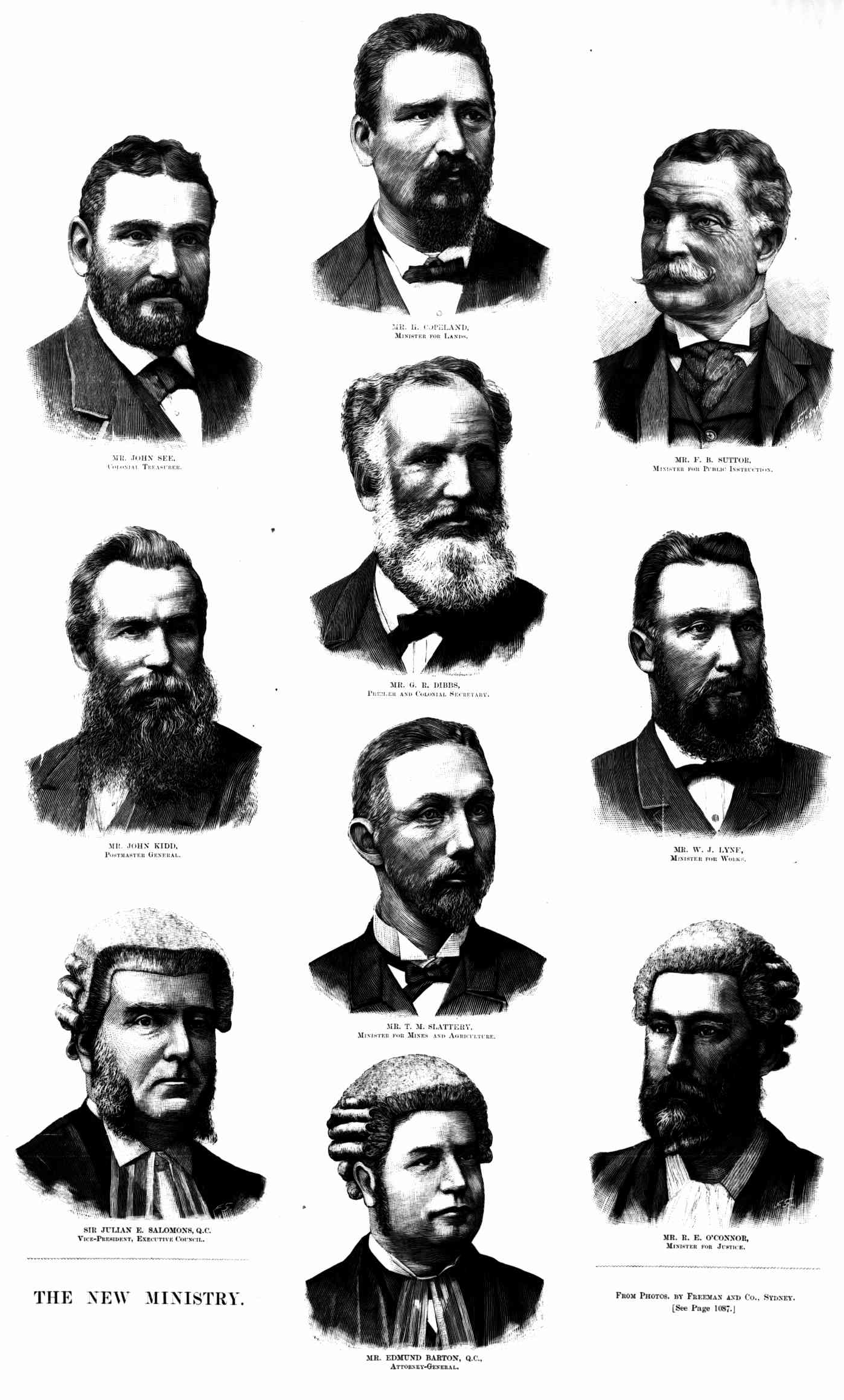

== Composition of ministry ==
Portfolio	Minister	Party	Term start	Term end	Term length
Premier; Colonial Secretary; Registrar of Records	Sir George Dibbs	Protectionist	23 October 1891	2 August 1894	2 years, 283 days
Colonial Treasurer; Collector of Internal Revenue	John See	Protectionist	23 October 1891	2 August 1894	2 years, 283 days
Attorney General	Edmund Barton QC (Note: Edmund Barton was acting Premier from 30 April to 13 September 1892 while Sir George Dibbs was visiting London.)	Protectionist	23 October 1891	14 December 1893	2 years, 52 days
Attorney General	Charles Heydon MLC	Protectionist	15 December 1893	2 August 1894	230 days
Secretary for Lands	Henry Copeland	Protectionist	23 October 1891	2 August 1894	2 years, 283 days
Secretary for Public Works	William Lyne	Protectionist	23 October 1891	2 August 1894	2 years, 283 days
Minister of Justice	Richard O'Connor MLC (Note: Richard O'Connor was appointed Solicitor General from 19 July to 13 September 1893 to allow him to deputise for the Attorney General while Edmund Barton was visiting Canada.)	Protectionist	23 October 1891	14 December 1893	2 years, 52 days
Minister of Justice	Thomas Slattery	Protectionist	15 December 1893	2 August 1894	230 days
Secretary for Mines and Agriculture	Thomas Slattery	Protectionist	23 October 1891	2 August 1894	2 years, 283 days
Minister of Public Instruction	Francis Suttor (Note: Francis Suttor was acting Colonial Secretary from 30 April to 13 September 1892 while Sir George Dibbs was visiting London.)	Protectionist	23 October 1891	2 August 1894	2 years, 283 days
Postmaster-General	John Kidd	Protectionist	27 October 1891	2 August 1894	2 years, 279 days
Vice-President of the Executive Council; Representative of the Government in Legislative Council	Sir Julian Salomons MLC	Protectionist	23 October 1891	26 January 1893	1 year, 95 days
Vice-President of the Executive Council; Representative of the Government in Legislative Council	Normand MacLaurin MLC	Protectionist	5 April 1893	2 August 1894	1 year, 119 days

Ministers were members of the Legislative Assembly unless otherwise noted.

== See also ==
  - Members of Legislative Assembly
  - (1891–1894)
  - Members of Legislative Council
  - (1891–1894)
  - Dibbs ministries
  - First (1885)
  - Second (18989)

== Notes ==
Preceded by Fifth Parkes ministry	Third Dibbs ministry 1891–1894	Succeeded by Reid ministry
