= Bowie Wilson =

Politician from New South Wales, Australia (1820-1883)

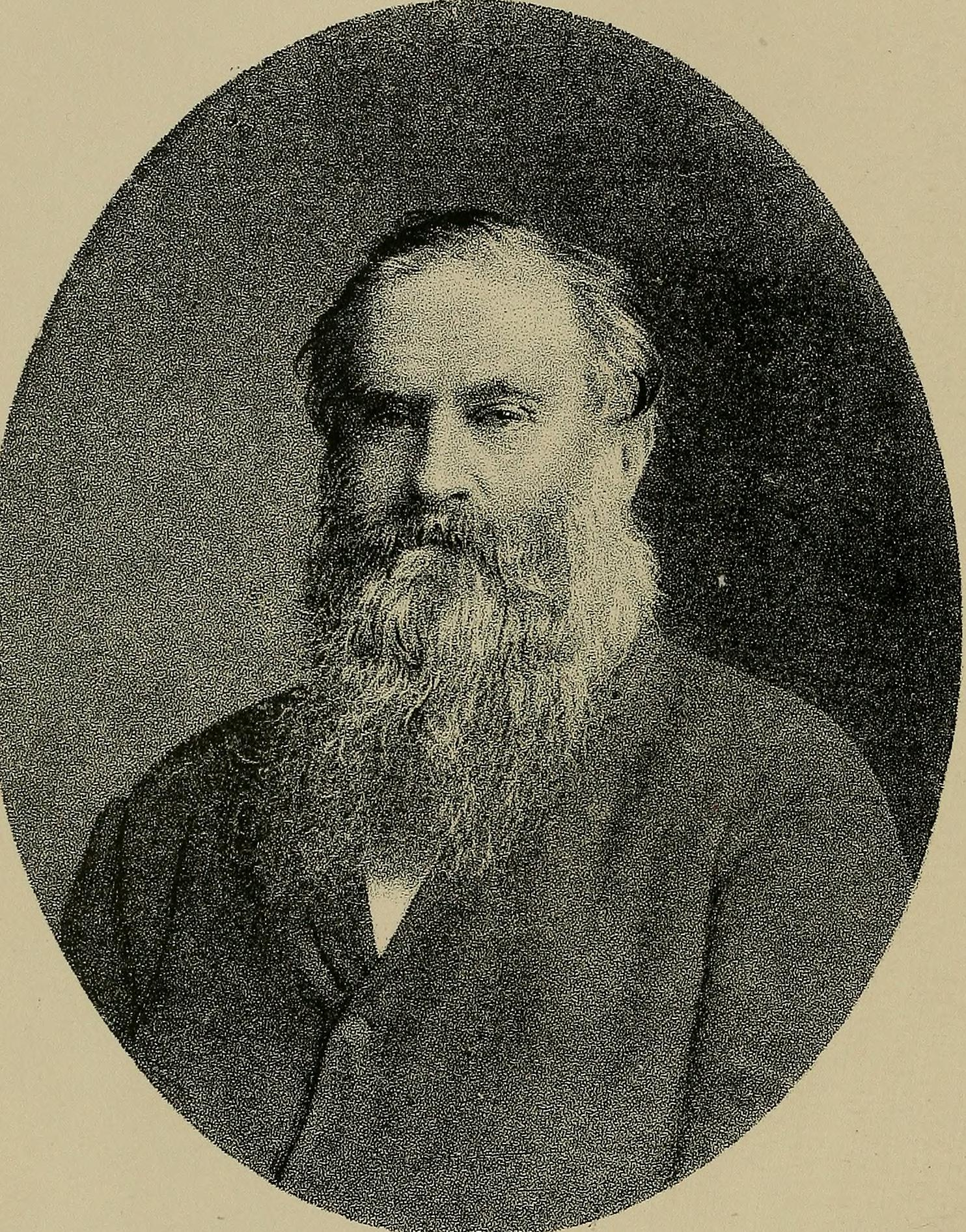
HONBLE J. BOWIE WILSON (Nineteenth Century Miracles (1884) by Emma Hardinge Britten.

John Bowie Wilson (17 June 1820 – 30 April 1883), often referred to as J. Bowie Wilson, was a politician, gold miner and hydropath in colonial New South Wales, a member of the New South Wales Legislative Assembly for more than 12 years.

== Personal life ==
Wilson was born at Irvine, Ayrshire, Scotland, the third son of Rev. John Wilson, DD. Wilson was educated at Irvine and at the Edinburgh and Aberdeen Universities. He arrived in Australia in June 1840, leaving in 1848, before returning in 1854. He tried gold mining at Araluen but was not successful. He began practising hydrotherapy and calling himself doctor. He married Julie née Bell on 9 July 1859; their children included Julia "Dollie" Bowie Wilson, who married Francis Alfred Allison Russell on 18 April 1899 and died on 24 March 1900.

== Politics ==
In July 1859 was elected to the New South Wales Parliament for the Goldfields South, retaining it until 1864. His biographer describes Wilson as an ultra-radical who was obsessed with abolishing state-aid to religion, opposing Charles Cowper's bill because it did not go far enough. Wilson was Secretary for Lands in the conservative first Martin ministry from October 1863 to February 1865, also serving as Secretary for Lands in the second Martin Ministry from January 1866 to October 1868, and third Martin Ministry from December 1870 to May 1872. At the 1864–65 election he chose not to re-contest Goldfield South and instead was a candidate for Patrick's Plains. Henry Parkes satirised his transformation from radical to conservative in verse which included

Bowie fell among the tories,
who beguiled poor Bowie's brains;
Shorn of all his former glories,
Bowie's gone to Patrick's Plains,

Wilson won Patrick's Plains, however the Martin government was defeated. Wilson retained the seat until his defeat at the election in December 1869. He was not long out of parliament, being elected at the February 1870 by-election for East Sydney. Both Wilson and Martin were soundly defeated at the 1872 colonial election for East Sydney. He subsequently contested Liverpool Plains but was soundly defeated, finishing a distant 4th. Wilson made a final unsuccessful attempt at the East Sydney by-election in June 1872, before retiring from politics.

Wilson distinguished himself by his efforts to secure parks and recreation grounds for the people of Sydney.

== Later life ==
Wilson married his second wife, Elizabeth Gowing, on 5 July 1873. He died on 30 April 1883 (aged 62) at Moore Park, New South Wales.

Parliament of New South Wales
Political offices
Preceded by John Robertson	Secretary for Lands; 1863 – 1865	Succeeded by John Robertson
Preceded by John Robertson	Secretary for Lands; 1866 – 1868	Succeeded by William Forster
Preceded by John Robertson	Secretary for Lands; 1870 – 1872	Succeeded by James Farnell
New South Wales Legislative Assembly
New district	Member for Goldfields South; 1859 – 1864	Succeeded by James Rodd
Preceded by Joseph Harpur	Member for Patrick's Plains; 1864 – 1869	Succeeded by James Hoskins
Preceded by Henry Parkes	Member for East Sydney; 1870 – 1872; With: George King; David Buchanan; James Martin	Succeeded by Henry Parkes; John Macintosh; Saul Samuel; James Neale
