= John Black (Canadian judge) =

Politician and judge at Red River Colony in Canada and New South Wales, Australia

John Black (11 March 1817 – 3 February 1879) was a Scottish-born figure who acted in the politics of both the future Canada and the fledgling Australia.

Black resided in the British North America from 1839 until 1854, then returned to Scotland. He resided in New South Wales, on Australia's East Coast, from 1857 to 1861. He returned to England, where he was promptly (April 1862) assigned a post in Assiniboia, remaining in North America until 1870. He returned to Scotland, where he died (at St. Andrews) in 1879 at age 61.

== Career ==
Black was born in Fife County in Scotland in 1817. He became a lawyer by working as a clerk for seven years in the office of an Edinburgh solicitor, although he never became a member of the bar.

Black traveled to the Red River Colony, in what is now the Canadian province of Manitoba in 1839, having been appointed clerk to the General Quarterly Court of Assiniboia. His duties as deputy to Adam Thom, the recorder of Rupert's Land, were soon superseded by his active employment in the offices of the Hudson's Bay Company. In 1848 the company appointed him chief trader.

In 1850 Black was appointed chief accountant of the Upper Red River district, with residence at Fort Garry (Winnipeg). The governor had appointed him unwillingly, and continued to look for a more suitable candidate. On 21 July 1852 Black lost his post as chief accountant.

Black left the company and 1854 and returned to Scotland. He moved to Australia in 1857, and promptly became engaged in the newly-formed Parliament of New South Wales.

Black was a member of the New South Wales Legislative Assembly from 1859 to 1860, representing the seat of East Sydney. He had moved to New South Wales in 1857 and was chairman of the newly-formed Land League. He was Secretary of Lands from 27 October 1859 to 8 March 1860 in William Forster's administration. He retired from the Assembly in 1860 and returned to England in 1861.

In the spring of 1861 Black was appointed president of the General Quarterly Court of Assiniboia. He was assuming what had previously been the office of recorder; the title was changed to allow his appointment, since he had never been a member of the bar. On 4 June 1862 the new president was introduced to the Council of Assiniboia. He presided over the tribunal at Assiniboia for eight years. He had decided to resign in the summer of 1868, but the company asked him to remain. He finally departed in March 1870.

Black's tenure at Assiniboia covered the 1869-1870 Red River Rebellion. He presided over the council on 23 October 1869 when Louis Riel was summoned to explain his rationale for preventing lieutenant governor-designate William McDougall from entering the Red River Colony. However, he was also one of three delegates (along with Alfred Henry Scott and Joseph-Noël Ritchot) selected by Riel to travel to Ottawa, Ontario to negotiate with the Canadian Government on behalf of Riel's provisional government. During the negotiations, Black proved to be more conciliatory to the government than the other negotiators.

When the talks were finished, Black contemplated returning immediately to London. He was offered the position of lieutenant governor or of recorder of Manitoba, but he declined, and in the summer of 1870 took up residence in Scotland for good.

He died at St. Andrews on 3 February 1879 (aged 61).

== Personal ==
Black married Margaret Christie, daughter of the governor of Assiniboia, in 1845. She traveled with him on a visit to Scotland over the winter of 1852/1853; she died soon after their return to Canada. Her death was the principal motivation for his leaving the Hudson's Bay Company and his return to Scotland in 1854.

New South Wales Legislative Assembly
New seat	Member for East Sydney; 1859–1860; Served alongside: Cowper/Faucett, Martin, Parkes	Succeeded by John Caldwell; Charles Cowper; Robert Stewart
