= November 1891 East Sydney colonial by-election =

By-election in New South Wales, Australia

A by-election was held for the New South Wales Legislative Assembly electorate of East Sydney on 7 November 1891 because Edmund Barton (Protectionist) was appointed Attorney General in the third Dibbs ministry. Such ministerial by-elections were usually uncontested and the other seven other ministers, George Dibbs (The Murrumbidgee), Henry Copeland (New England), John Kidd (Camden), William Lyne (The Hume), John See (Grafton), Thomas Slattery (Boorowa) and Francis Suttor (Bathurst), were re-elected unopposed.

== Dates ==
Date	Event
23 October 1891	Dibbs ministry appointed.
27 October 1891	Writ of election issued by the Speaker of the Legislative Assembly.
3 November 1891	Nominations
7 November 1891	Polling day
27 November 1891	Return of writ

== Result ==
1891 East Sydney by-election Saturday 7 November
Party	Candidate	Votes	%	±%
Protectionist	Edmund Barton (re-elected)	2,778	71.4	
Labour	William Grantham	1,112	28.6	
Total formal votes		3,890	99.6	
Informal votes		17	0.4	
Turnout		3,907	38.9	
Protectionist hold				

== See also ==
- Electoral results for the district of East Sydney
- List of New South Wales state by-elections
