= George Oakes (Australian politician) =

Politician from New South Wales, Australia (1813 – 1881)

Personal details
- Born: 1 January 1813 Parramatta, New South Wales
- Died: 10 August 1881 (aged 68) Sydney

George Oakes (1813 – 10 August 1881) was an Australian pastoralist and politician. He was a member of the New South Wales Legislative Council for two periods between 1848 and 1856 and again between 1879 and 1881. He was also a member of the New South Wales Legislative Assembly for two periods between 1856 and 1860 and again between 1872 and 1874.

== Early life ==
Oakes was the son of a former Wesleyan missionary who had become the chief constable of Parramatta. He was educated privately and showed an early interest in pastoral matters. In the 1840s he bought land in the Nineteen Counties in partnership with his brother Francis Oakes who also became a member of the Legislative Assembly. By 1856, Oakes had acquired more than 130,000 acres of pastoral land in the Wellington district and was independently wealthy. He was also a director of numerous companies including the Australian Gas Light Company.

Oakes was active in community organizations in the Parramatta area including the Anti-transportation League, the board of Parramatta Hospital and the Royal Agricultural Society of New South Wales.

== State parliament ==
In 1848, prior to the establishment of responsible self-government, Oakes was elected to the semi-elective Legislative Council. He represented the electorate of Parramatta until the granting of responsible self-government in 1856. Subsequently, at the first election under the new constitution he was elected to the Legislative Assembly as one of the two members for the same seat. He remained the member until he was defeated at the 1860 election. He then traveled extensively in Europe

On 13 May 1861, in an attempt to swamp the upper house to carry his land reform bills, the premier, Charles Cowper, nominated Oakes to a limited-time appointment in the Legislative Council . However, he could not be sworn in as the President of the New South Wales Legislative Council, William Burton, walked out of the chamber in protest at the government's actions. When the council again met in June, Oakes refused to take his seat due to objections to the conditions that Cowper had placed on his appointment.

While affirming his Protestantism, Oakes objected to the political use of sectarianism practised by Henry Parkes and the Protestant Political Association. Parkes, in turn, believed that he was a 'sneak' who was 'forever pretending to be the friend of some body of men, while secretly endeavouring to discredit them'. As a result of his anti-sectarian stand and opposition to Parkes, Oakes failed at several attempts to re-enter the Assembly but was eventually elected as the member for East Sydney at the 1872 by-election caused by the appointment of Saul Samuel to the Legislative Council. He did not contest the next election in 1874–75 but was given a life appointment to the Legislative Council in 1879. He died after being run over by a steam tram outside Parliament House after a late-night sitting.

== Family ==
=== Marriages ===
Oakes married Mary Ann Shelley at St John's Church of England, Parramatta, on 25 May 1837 and she died in 1865. He married secondly a widow, Mary Anne Morrison, in Hobart Town on 30 April 1867 and she predeceased him.

=== Sons ===
By his first marriage, Oakes had three sons. On his death, he was survived by his youngest son, Arthur. Dr Arthur William Oakes was born in Parramatta on 11 October 1850 and was educated by William Woolls and at Newington College commencing in 1863. He went to Scotland to study at the University of Edinburgh graduating with an MD. On his return to Australia he worked in private practice at Woollahra, New South Wales. After his father's death he returned to the United Kingdom and died at home in Bexhill-on-Sea on 23 March 1902, at the age of 51. He was survived by a widow and two daughters.

New South Wales Legislative Assembly
New assembly	Member for Parramatta; 1856 – 1860; With: Henry Parker / James Byrnes	Succeeded by John Lackey
Preceded by Saul Samuel	Member for East Sydney; 1872 – 1874; With: Henry Parkes; John Macintosh; James Neale / Charles Moore	Succeeded by Henry Parkes; John Macintosh; Alexander Stuart; John Davies
