= Francis Burdett Dixon =

Francis Burdett Dixon (9 August 1836 – 7 April 1884) was an English-born Australian trade unionist.

He was born at Leeds in Yorkshire to stonemason Joseph Dixon and Susannah Bland. He married weaver Elizabeth Chadwick on 16 October 1854, and they migrated to Victoria in 1859. The Dixons moved to Sydney in 1864, where Francis joined the Operative Stonemason's Society, becoming secretary of the central committee. He was chairman in 1869 and secretary again in 1870. During this period he was often forced to leave Sydney in order to find itinerant work in the country. Having risen to a prominent position in the union movement, he was secretary of the Eight Hour System Extension League from 1869 to 1871 and was an early delegate of the Trades and Labor Council, serving from 1872 to 1882. He campaigned extensively for the eight-hour day and supported the labour movement's direct involvement in the political system. He was the chief leader of the 1873–74 iron trades strike, and helped negotiate its resolution.

Dixon continued to argue for labour representation in parliament, and was the chief organiser for Angus Cameron's campaign in West Sydney in 1874. Cameron disassociated himself with the Trades and Labor Council in 1876, and in 1877 Dixon was himself a candidate for East Sydney. He became a committed protectionist, and remained a leading figure in the development of the labour movement. In 1879 he was the chair of the first Intercolonial Trade Union Congress. In 1882 he returned to the presidency of the Trades and Labor Council, moving it away from the more conciliatory stance taken by Edward O'Sullivan. The following year he became ill with lung disease, from which he died in 1884. His destitute family was supported by a collection run by the Trades and Labor Council. The Australian Dictionary of Biography described Dixon as the leading nineteenth-century trade unionist in Australia, and his attempts to have the labour movement organise politically presaged the formation of the Australian Labor Party in 1891.
