= Marshall Burdekin =

Australian politician

Marshall Burdekin (11 April 1837 – 10 November 1886) was an Australian politician.

He was born in Sydney to merchant Thomas Burdekin and Mary Ann Bossley. Educated at Darlinghurst, he received a Master of Arts from the University of Sydney in 1859 and was called to the bar later that year. He had inherited a large fortune from his father in 1844.

He was elected to the New South Wales Legislative Assembly for Liverpool Plains at the 1863 by-election, transferring to The Williams at the 1864–65 election. In 1866 he was appointed Colonial Treasurer, but he was defeated at the ministerial by-election, and thus held office for less than a month. He returned to the Assembly at the 1867 by-election for East Sydney, but he did not re-contest in 1869.

Subsequently, he lived mainly overseas, falling seriously ill in America in 1877 and suffering from ill health continuously until his death in England in 1886.

His brother Sydney was also a colonial politician.

Political offices
Preceded by Saul Samuel	Colonial Treasurer; January 1866	Succeeded by Geoffrey Eagar
New South Wales Legislative Assembly
Preceded by Alexander Dick	Member for Liverpool Plains; 1863–1864	Succeeded by John Lloyd
Preceded by William Allen	Member for Williams; 1864–1866	Succeeded by Frederick Manton
Preceded by Charles Cowper	Member for East Sydney; 1867–1869; Served alongside: Hart, Neale, Stewart	Succeeded by David Buchanan; George King; James Martin; Henry Parkes
