= Arthur Renwick =

Australian politician

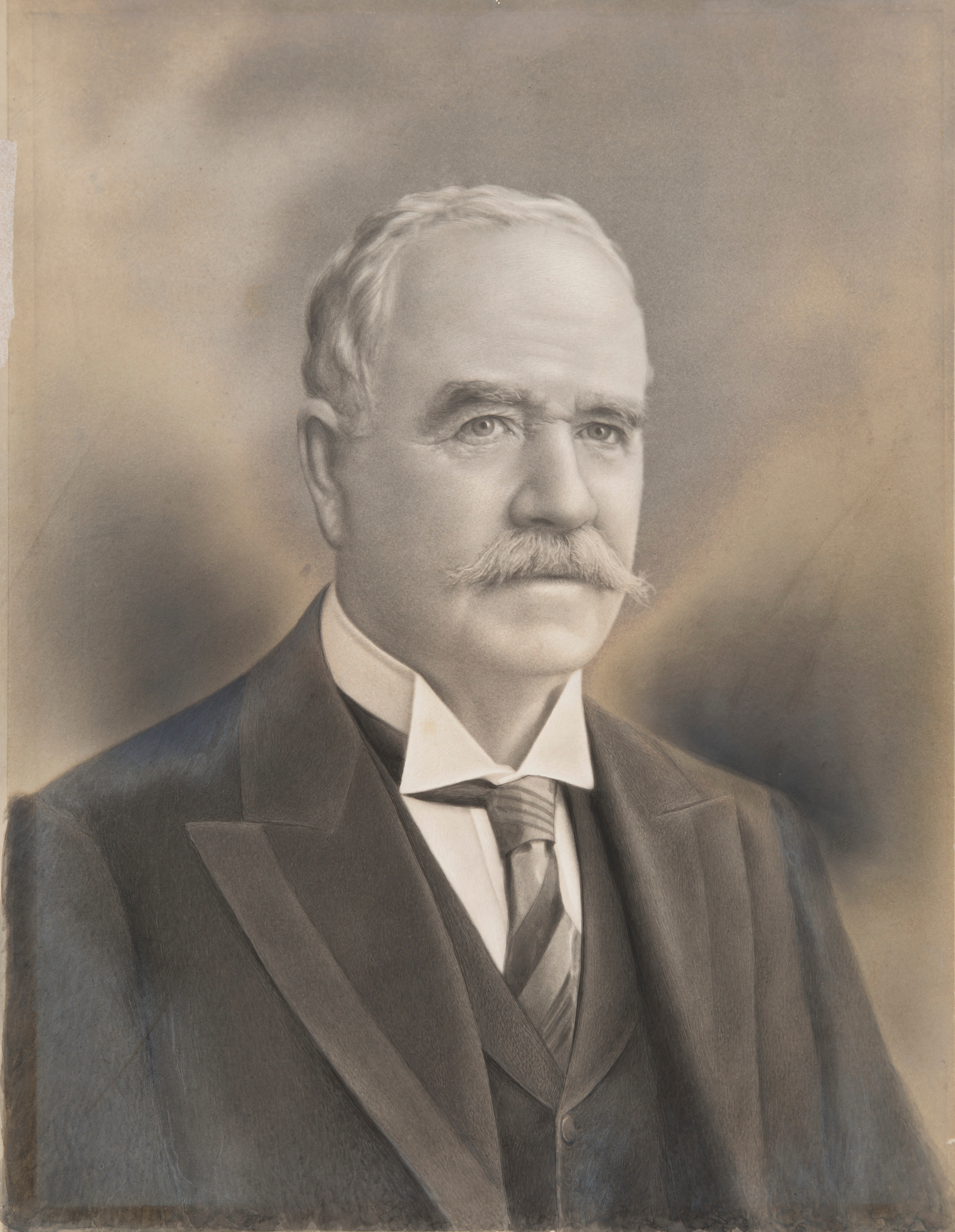
Sir Arthur Renwick (1837-1908) Sydney physician, politician and philanthropist

Sir Arthur Renwick FRCS (30 May 1837 – 23 November 1908) was an Australian physician, politician and philanthropist.

== Early life ==
Renwick was born in Glasgow, Scotland, the son of George Renwick, a bricklayer, and his wife Christina, née Condie. His parents travelled as bounty immigrants aboard the Helen, arriving in Sydney, Australia on 21 July 1841. His father was Mayor of Redfern from February 1862 to February 1864 and from February 1867 until February 1872. Renwick was educated at Redfern Grammar School and the University of Sydney, where he matriculated in 1853 and graduated B.A. in 1857. Renwick then studied at the University of Edinburgh where he graduated M.B. (1860), M.D. (1861), and F.R.C.S., Edinburgh. Renwick did further courses in Glasgow, London and Paris.

== Medical career ==
Renwick then returned to Sydney in 1862, living in Redfern where he set up a successful medical practice. He was president of a branch of the British Medical Association. In 1868, Renwick married Elizabeth, daughter of Rev. John Saunders, at the Redfern Congregational Church. Renwick also became an examiner in medicine at the University of Sydney, and in 1877 was elected to its senate.

== Politician and philanthropist ==
Renwick attempted to enter the New South Wales Legislative Assembly for the university seat at the by-election in August 1879 but was defeated by Edmund Barton, however he was elected a member for East Sydney at the by-election in December 1879. He became Secretary for Mines in the third ministry of Sir Henry Parkes on 12 October 1881, but was unsuccessful in the December 1882 election. He won the seat of Redfern in October 1885, and was Minister of Public Instruction in the ministry of Sir Patrick Jennings from 26 February 1886 to 19 January 1887. That year he became a member of the Legislative Council, a position that he retained for life.

He was knighted in 1894. Renwick died at Sydney of heart disease on 23 November 1908 (aged 71), he was survived by his wife, five sons and a daughter.

Parliament of New South Wales
Political offices
Preceded by Ezekiel Baker	Secretary for Mines; 1881 – 1883	Succeeded by Joseph Abbott
Preceded by James Young	Minister of Public Instruction; 1886 – 1887	Succeeded by James Inglis
New South Wales Legislative Assembly
Preceded by Alexander Stuart	Member for East Sydney; 1879 – 1881; With: John Davies / George Reid; James Greenwood / Henry Parkes; John Macintosh / Henry Dangar	Succeeded by Edmund Barton; George Griffiths; John McElhone
Preceded by John Sutherland; Alfred Fremlin; Francis Wright	Member for Redfern; 1885 – 1887; With: John Sutherland; Thomas Williamson	Succeeded by James Farnell; William Schey; William Stephen
