= David Buchanan (politician) =

Politician and barrister in New South Wales, Australia

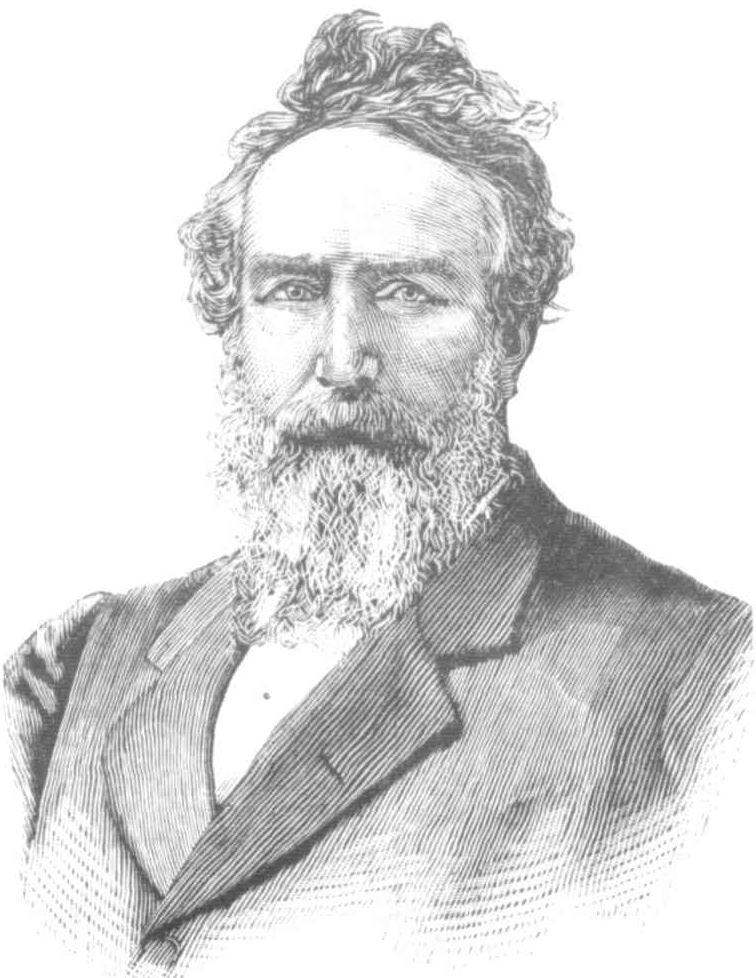
Mr David Buchanan MLC

David Buchanan (1823 – 4 April 1890) was a barrister and politician in colonial New South Wales, a member of the New South Wales Legislative Assembly and later, the New South Wales Legislative Council.

Buchanan was born in Edinburgh, Scotland, the fifth son of William Buchanan, a barrister, and his wife, Catherine (née Gregory). Buchanan was educated at the Edinburgh High School. He emigrated to Australia in 1852, and was elected to the New South Wales Legislative Assembly as member for Morpeth on 14 December 1860. In 1862, he unsuccessfully sued the Sydney Morning Herald for libel and was required to pay their legal costs. He was drunk in August 1862 and was involved in an altercation with Samuel Terry, the New South Wales Legislative Assembly member for Mudgee. In the assembly Buchanan described Terry as a coward, eventually withdrawing the remark. Buchanan continued to interrupt and held to be in contempt of parliament. He refused to leave the chamber, was arrested by the Sergeant-at-arms and forcibly removed. He was unable to pay the legal costs of his failed libel suit and declared himself bankrupt and resigned from parliament. He re-contested the seat at the resulting by-election but was defeated.

He was returned to the Legislative Assembly as a representative of East Macquarie at a by-election in October 1864, serving until 1 August 1867. He resigned in 1867 and went to England, entering at the Middle Temple in November of that year, being called to the bar in June 1869. He then returned to New South Wales, and practised his profession, being elected to the Legislative Assembly for East Sydney (3 December 1869 to 3 February 1872), and for Goldfields West (25 March 1872 to 12 October 1877). Though defeated at 1879 Mudgee by-election, the election was overturned by the Committee of Elections and Qualifications and Buchanan was declared duly elected in March 1879, a seat he held until 7 October 1885. Buchanan represented Central Cumberland from 15 May 1888 to 19 January 1889.

As a politician Buchanan gained prominence by his sturdy championship of fiscal protection. He revisited England in 1886, and published a selection from his orations and speeches. Having unsuccessfully contested Balmain at the general election in January 1889, he was nominated to the Legislative Council on 27 February 1889, a position he held until his death.

New South Wales Legislative Assembly
| Preceded by Samuel Cohen | Member for Morpeth; 1860–1862 | Succeeded by Edward Close |
| Preceded by William Suttor | Member for East Macquarie; 1864–1867; Served alongside: William Cummings | Succeeded by John Suttor |
| Preceded by Burdekin, Hart, Neale & Stewart | Member for East Sydney; 1869–1872; Served alongside: King, H Parkes/Wilson & Martin | Succeeded by Neale, Macintosh, H Parkes & Samuel |
| Preceded by Walter Church | Member for Goldfields West; 1872–1877 | Succeeded by Hugo Louis Beyers |
| Preceded by Richard Rouse | Member for Mudgee; 1879–1885; Served alongside: from 1880Terry/Robertson & Beyers/Taylor | Succeeded by Robertson, Taylor & Browne |
| Preceded by V Parkes, Farnell & McCulloch | Member for Central Cumberland; 1888–1889; Served alongside: Nobbs & Farnell | Succeeded by Nobbs, Farnell, Ritchie & Linsley |
