= Charles Moore (Australian politician) =

Australian politician

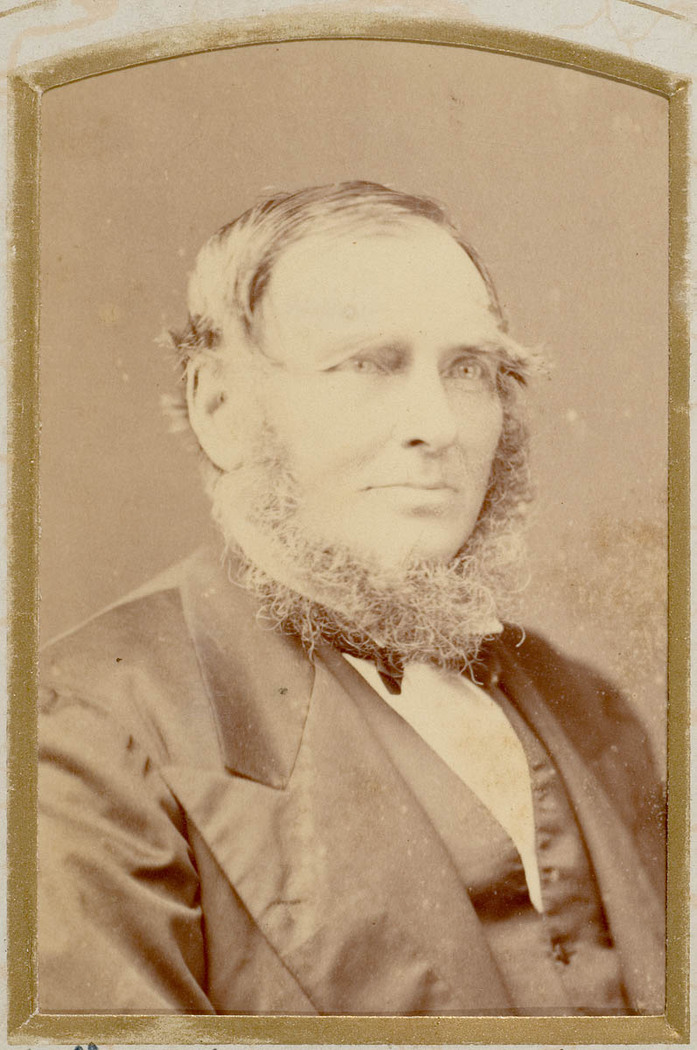
Charles Moore

Charles Moore (29 August 1820 – 4 July 1895) was an Irish-born Australian politician.

He was born at Ballymacarne in County Cavan to farmer James Moore and Catherine Rogers. He was educated at Fermanagh and became an apprentice draper, eventually in Dublin. He came to South Australia with a drapery shipment and settled in Sydney in 1850, where he opened his own drapery. He married twice: first to Sarah Jane Wilcox, and second to Annie Hill Montgomery in 1883.

He was a Randwick alderman from 1860 to 1886 and mayor in 1863, and a Sydney City Councillor from 1865 to 1869 and from 1871 to 1886, serving as Mayor from 1867 to 1869.

Moore was elected to the Legislative Assembly for East Sydney at the July 1874 by-election, but he was defeated at the general election in December that year. In 1880 he was appointed to the Legislative Council, where he served until his death.

He died at Parramatta on July 4, 1895 (aged 74). Moore Park and Moore Stairs are named for him.

New South Wales Legislative Assembly
Preceded by James Neale	Member for East Sydney; 1874; With: John Macintosh; Henry Parkes; George Oakes	Succeeded by Henry Parkes; John Macintosh; Alexander Stuart; John Davies
Civic offices
Preceded by John Sutton	Mayor of Sydney; 1867–1869	Succeeded by Walter Renny
