= John Macintosh =

Australian politician (1821–1911)

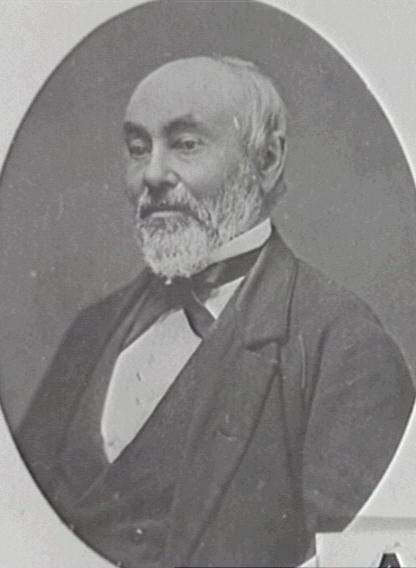
Alderman John Macintosh (01/01/1877 - 31/12/1877), A-00041488 City of Sydney Archives

John Macintosh (8 July 1821 – 6 July 1911) was a Scottish-born politician in the British colony of New South Wales.

He was born at Nairn to farm manager James Macintosh and Barbara Watson. He was orphaned in 1831 and worked as a farm labourer before migrating to Sydney in 1839. He worked in a variety of rural jobs including fencing and tobacco planting before opening an ironmongery in 1846. On 10 May 1849 he married Caroline Alway, with whom he had seven children. He continued his ironmongery and from 1861 to 1877 was a member of Sydney City Council.

In 1872 he was elected to the New South Wales Legislative Assembly for East Sydney, serving until his retirement in 1880. In 1882 he was appointed to the New South Wales Legislative Council, where he remained until his death at Darling Point on 6 July 1911 (aged 89).

New South Wales Legislative Assembly
Preceded by David Buchanan; George King; James Martin; Bowie Wilson	Member for East Sydney; 1872–1880; With: James Neale / Charles Moore / John Davies; Henry Parkes / James Greenwood; Saul Samuel / George Oakes / Alexander Stuart / Arthur Renwick	Succeeded by Henry Dangar; Henry Parkes; George Reid
