= Robert Stewart (New South Wales politician) =

Australian politician

Robert Stewart (28 July 1816 – 9 June 1875) was an Australian politician.

He was born in Sydney to master mariner William Stewart and Charlotte Kirk. His father was drowned in 1820 and the family lived on Broken Bay on the Hawkesbury River until 1831, when they went to Sydney. Stewart was apprenticed as a cabinet maker, and later worked as an undertaker. Around 1843 he married Isabella Craig, with whom he had a son. In 1860 he was elected to the New South Wales Legislative Assembly for East Sydney. He retired in 1864, but returned in 1866, retiring again in 1869. He died at Sydney on the day of his wedding to Annie Carss in 1875.

New South Wales Legislative Assembly
Preceded by John Black; Peter Faucett; James Martin	Member for East Sydney; 1860–1864; Served alongside: Caldwell, Cowper, Parkes/Forster	Succeeded by James Hart; James Neale
Preceded by John Caldwell	Member for East Sydney; 1866–1869; Served alongside: Cowper/Burdekin, Hart, Neale	Succeeded by David Buchanan; George King; James Martin; Henry Parkes
