= James Hart (Australian politician) =

Australian politician

Member of the New South Wales Parliament for New England and Macleay
- In office 26 November 1858 – 11 April 1859
- Preceded by: Abram Moriarty
- Succeeded by: Seat abolished

Member of the New South Wales Parliament for New England
- In office 30 June 1859 – 10 November 1860
- Preceded by: Seat created
- Succeeded by: George Markham

Member of the New South Wales Parliament for Bathurst
- In office 6 December 1860 – 10 November 1864
- Preceded by: John Clements
- Succeeded by: James Kemp

Member of the New South Wales Parliament for East Sydney
- In office 22 November 1864 – 15 November 1869
- Preceded by: Robert Stewart
- Succeeded by: David Buchanan

Member of the New South Wales Parliament for Monaro
- In office 17 November 1870 – 3 February 1872
- Preceded by: Daniel Egan
- Succeeded by: William Grahame

Personal details
- Born: James Hart; 1825 Ireland
- Died: 26 June 1873 (aged 47–48) Sydney, New South Wales, Australia
- Occupation: Solicitor

James Hart (1825–1873) was a politician in the New South Wales Legislative Assembly.

== Early life ==
Hart was born in Carlow, Ireland in 1825. He was son of William Hart and Mary Cahill. Hart arrived in New South Wales in 1841. He was admitted as a solicitor in 1853. He practised in Sydney and was part owner of a practice.

== Politics ==
Hart began his career in politics in 1858 when Abram Moriarty resigned from the seat of New England and Macleay in the colony's north. He won the show of hands and was declared elected when neither candidate called for a poll. The seat was abolished in 1859, replaced by New England and Tenterfield, with Hart successfully contesting New England at the 1859 election, winning by a mere two votes, a result that was upheld by the Elections and Qualifications Committee. At the 1860 election, Hart won the election for the seat of Bathurst in the colony's west on 6 December 1860. As such, he withdrew from the New England contest which was held on 24 December. At the following election in 1864–65, Hart changed seats again when he elected to the multi-member electorate of East Sydney. He did not recontest the 1869–70 election but Hart re-entered the parliament in 1870 after winning the Monara by-election caused by the death of Daniel Egan. Hart retired from parliament in February 1872.

== Personal life ==
Hart married Harriet Dawson on 7 September 1843.

== Death ==
Hart died in Illalong, New South Wales on 26 June 1873 (aged 47–48).

New South Wales Legislative Assembly
| Preceded by Abram Moriarty | Member for New England and Macleay; 1858 – 1859; Served alongside: Taylor | District abolished |
| New district | Member for New England; 1859 – 1860 | Succeeded by George Markham |
| Preceded by John Clements | Member for Bathurst; 1860 – 1864 | Succeeded by James Kemp |
| Preceded by Robert Stewart | Member for East Sydney; 1864 – 1869; Served alongside: Cowper, Burdekin, Neale, Caldwell, Stewart | Succeeded by David Buchanan |
| Preceded by Daniel Egan | Member for Monara; 1870 – 1872 | Succeeded by William Grahame |
