= Alexander Stuart (Australian politician) =

Australian politician

Sir Alexander Stuart KCMG
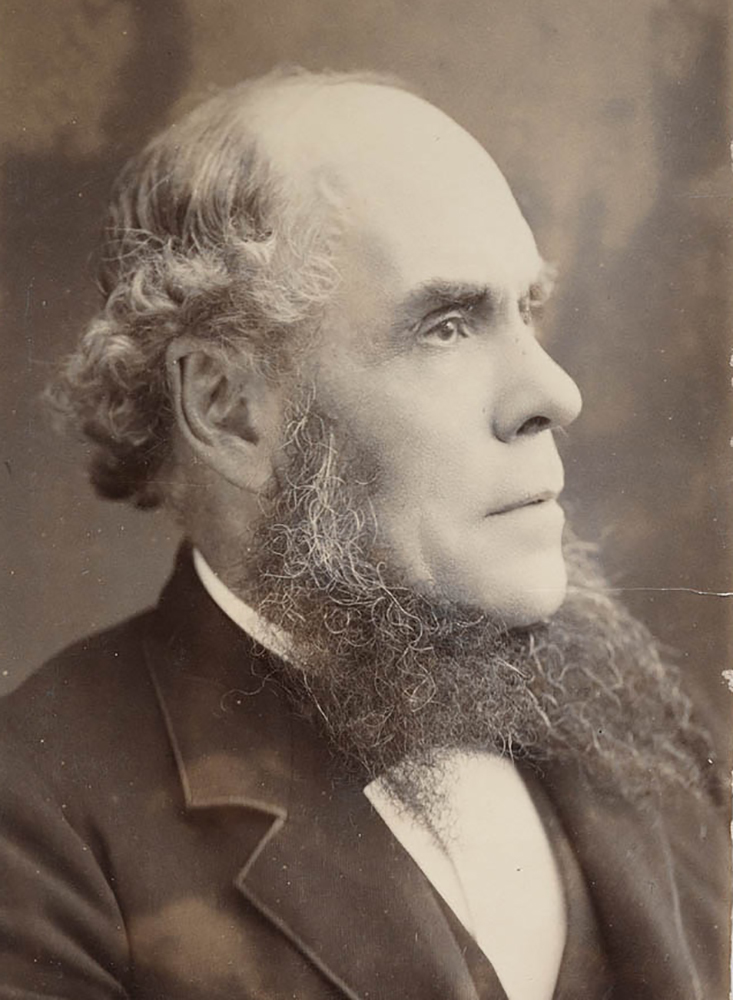
- Studio Portrait of Sir Alexander Stuart, c. 1882

9th Premier of New South Wales
- In office 5 January 1883 – 7 October 1885
- Governor: Lord Augustus Loftus
- Preceded by: Henry Parkes
- Succeeded by: George Dibbs

Personal details
- Born: 21 March 1824 Edinburgh, Scotland
- Died: 16 June 1886 (aged 62) London, England
- Spouse: Christiana Eliza Wood (m. 1853)

Sir Alexander Stuart KCMG (21 March 1824 – 16 June 1886) was Premier of New South Wales from 5 January 1883 to 7 October 1885.

== Early years ==
Stuart was born at Edinburgh, the son of Alexander Stuart and his wife Mary, née McKnight. Stuart was educated at the Edinburgh Academy and attended the University of Edinburgh, but did not graduate. On leaving school Stuart worked in merchant's office at Leith and at Glasgow. Then Stuart worked as manager of the North of Ireland Linen Mills. In 1845 Stuart worked for the mercantile and banking house Carr, Tagore and Company in Calcutta, India. Stuart went to New Zealand in 1850.

== Australia ==
On 9 October 1851 Stuart arrived in Sydney aboard the Scotia.

Stuart returned to Sydney in 1852 and joined the Bank of New South Wales as assistant secretary, in 1853 he was assistant inspector. In 1854 Stuart had become secretary and inspector of branches with a salary of £1200. On 10 November 1853 Suart married Christiana Eliza Wood. In 1854 Stuart investigated the embezzlement of funds from the bank's Ballarat branch by its manager, George D. Lang, son of John Dunmore Lang, who was convicted and sentenced to five years hard labour as a result. John Dunmore Lang published an attack on Stuart and the bank, The Convicts' Bank; or a Plain Statement of the Case of Alleged Embezzlement, and as a result Lang was charged and convicted of criminal libel and served six months in prison.

== Political career ==
Stuart was active as a vocal lay member of the Sydney Anglican synods from 1866 and a member of the standing committee of the Sydney Diocesan Committee and Educational and Book Society.

Stuart was asked by Bishop Frederic Barker to stand for parliament in 1874. The same year Stuart was elected a member of the Legislative Assembly for East Sydney on a platform of support for the 1866 Public Schools Act, the 'rapid extension' of railways and aid to municipalities.

On 8 February 1876 Stuart succeeded William Forster as colonial treasurer in the third ministry led by Sir John Robertson. Stuart gave up his appointment as an agent-general at London in April 1880 in order to fend off bankruptcy without having left Sydney.

Stuart was under constant attack in parliament during 1884 over his ownership of mineral lands in the Illawarra. In October 1884 Stuart had a paralytic stroke and went to Napier, New Zealand to recuperate at the house of his brother Edward Stuart, the Bishop of Waiapu. In 1886, Stuart died in London of typhoid, survived by his wife, son and probably one of his three daughters.

According to the Sydney Morning Herald, "He was slow in making up his mind, and there was a want of resolute firmness … but … he had a good deal of the dogged determination that belongs to the Scotch character, and a large capacity for patient endurance … He was very friendly … but he lacked that magnetic power which great leaders have of fascinating their comrades, and of binding them as it were by hooks of steel."

== Honours ==
Stuart was created a Knight Commander of the Order of St Michael and St George (KCMG) in 1885.

Parliament of New South Wales
Political offices
Preceded by Henry Parkes	Premier of New South Wales; Colonial Secretary; 1883 – 1885	Succeeded by George Dibbs
Preceded by William Forster	Colonial Treasurer; 1876 – 1877	Succeeded by William Piddington
New South Wales Legislative Assembly
Preceded by Charles Moore; George Oakes	Member for East Sydney; 1874 – 1879; Served alongside: Davies, Macintosh, Parkes/Greenwood	Succeeded by Arthur Renwick
Preceded by Samuel Gray	Member for Illawarra; 1880 – 1885	Succeeded by Andrew Lysaght
Diplomatic posts
Preceded by William Forster	Agent-General for New South Wales; 1879 – 1880	Succeeded by Sir Saul Samuel
