= John Caldwell (New South Wales politician) =

Australian politician

John Caldwell (c. 1817 – 14 April 1884) was an Irish-born Australian politician.

He was born at Drumrawn in County Tyrone to farmer Charles Caldwell. He worked as a shop assistant, and in 1841 married Jane Love, with whom he had five children. He would later remarry widow Ann Hurst on 3 January 1866. In 1841 he migrated to New South Wales and worked as a draper before establishing his own business on Pitt Street. From 1869 to 1861 he was a Sydney City Councillor. In 1860 he was elected to the New South Wales Legislative Assembly for East Sydney, serving until his resignation was forced by bankruptcy in 1866. He moved to Goulburn and served briefly as an alderman there in 1879. Caldwell died at Goulburn in 1884.

New South Wales Legislative Assembly
Preceded by John Black; Peter Faucett; James Martin	Member for East Sydney; 1860–1866; Served alongside: Cowper, Parkes/Forster/Neale, Stewart/Hart	Succeeded by Robert Stewart
