= Walter Bradley (Australian politician) =

Australian politician (1836–1893)

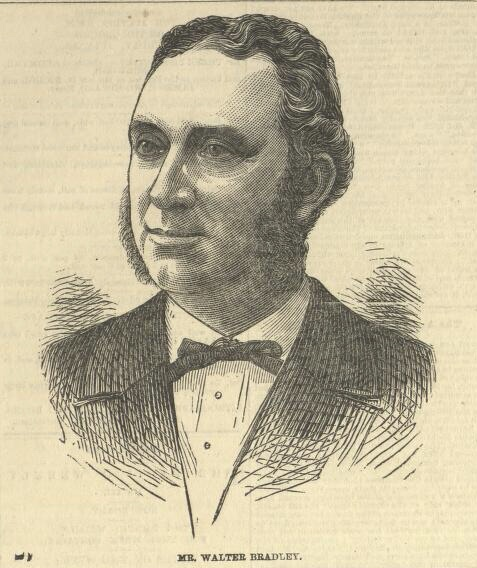
Walter Bradley, 1880

Walter Bradley (1 November 1836 – 27 June 1893) was an English-born Australian politician.

He was born at Hackney, near London, to Royal Mint assayer George Robert Bradley and Eliza Cave. He arrived in Sydney in 1854 and worked as an auctioneer at Wynyard. In 1859, he co-founded his own firm of Bradley, Norton and Lamb. On 31 March 1859, he married Emily Hobbs. The couple had fifteen children, only one of whom did not survive infancy.

He was a long-serving Randwick alderman, being thrice mayor, and was a founder of the Zoological Society of New South Wales and the Moore Park Zoological Gardens. He retired from his auctioneers' firm in 1887 to concentrate on real estate development, building a number of houses in Randwick. In 1891 he was elected in a by-election to the New South Wales Legislative Assembly as a Protectionist member for East Sydney, but he was defeated in the general election later that year. Bradley died at Randwick in 1893 of apoplexy and paralysis following two high-profile legal cases in which his wife sued first for Judicial Separation and then for divorce.(NSW BDM 1893/12575;NRS 13495 1892/836; 1891/722).

New South Wales Legislative Assembly
Preceded by John Street	Member for East Sydney; 1891; Served alongside: Burdekin, McMillan, Reid	Succeeded by Edmund Barton; Varney Parkes
