= James Neale (Australian politician) =

Australian politician (1828–1890)

James Henry Neale (27 December 1828 – 27 December 1890) was an Australian politician.

He was born in Liverpool to pastoralist John Neale and Sarah Lee. He was a butcher before entering politics. In 1864 he was elected to the New South Wales Legislative Assembly for East Sydney. He transferred to Hartley in 1869 and back to East Sydney in 1872 before retiring in 1874. In 1883 he was appointed to the New South Wales Legislative Council, where he remained until his death at Wentworth Falls in 1890.

New South Wales Legislative Assembly
Preceded by Charles Cowper; John Caldwell; William Forster; Robert Stewart	Member for East Sydney; 1864–1869; With: John Caldwell / Robert Stewart; Charles Cowper / Marshall Burdekin; James Hart	Succeeded by David Buchanan; George King; James Martin; Henry Parkes
Preceded by John Lucas	Member for Hartley; 1869–1872	Succeeded by Thomas Brown
Preceded by David Buchanan; George King; James Martin; Bowie Wilson	Member for East Sydney; 1872–1874; With: John Macintosh; Henry Parkes; Saul Samuel / George Oakes	Succeeded by Charles Moore
