= Saul Samuel =

Australian politician

The Honourable Sir Saul Samuel Bt KCMG CB
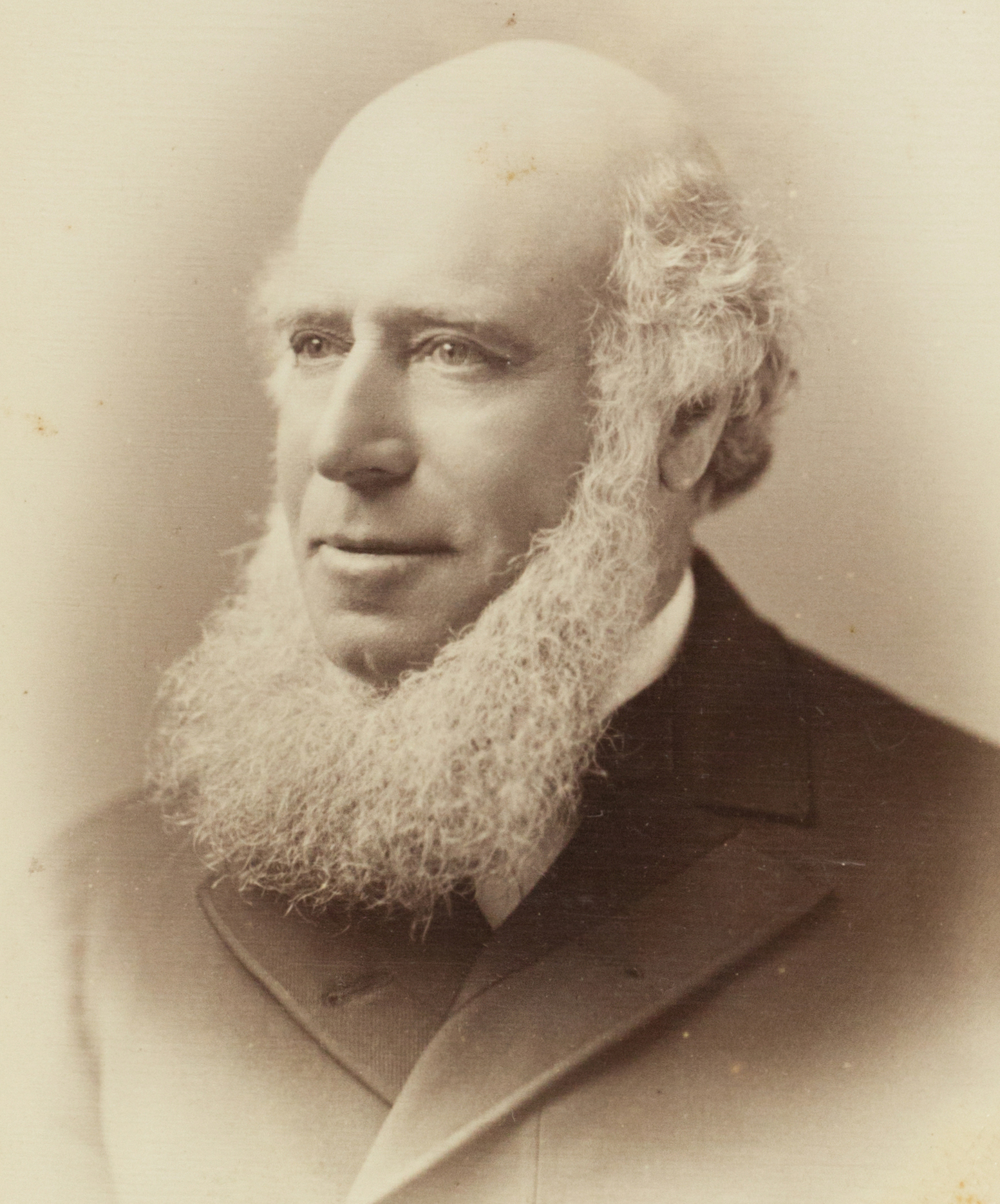

6th Treasurer of New South Wales
- In office 27 October 1859 – 8 March 1860
- Premier: William Forster
- Preceded by: Elias Weekes
- Succeeded by: Elias Weekes
- Constituency: Orange (1859 – 1860)
- In office 20 October 1865 – 3 January 1866
- Premier: Charles Cowper
- Preceded by: Thomas Smart
- Succeeded by: Marshall Burdekin
- Constituency: Wellington (1862 – 1869)
- In office 27 October 1868 – 15 December 1870
- Premier: John Robertson
- Preceded by: Geoffrey Eagar
- Succeeded by: George Lord
- Constituency: Orange (1869 – 1872)

Member of the Legislative Council of New South Wales
- In office 1 October 1854 – 29 February 1856
- In office 12 June 1872 – 16 August 1880

Personal details
- Born: 2 November 1820 London, England, UK
- Died: 29 August 1900 (aged 79) London, England, UK
- Relations: Samuel Lyons (uncle)

Sir Saul Samuel, 1st Baronet KCMG CB (2 November 1820 – 29 August 1900) was an Australian colonial merchant, member of parliament, pastoralist, and prominent Jew. Samuel achieved many breakthroughs for Jews in the colonial community of New South Wales including the first Jew to become a magistrate, the first Jew elected to parliament, the first Jew to become a minister of the Crown.

== Early years and background ==
Samuel was born in London, England on 2 November 1820, the posthumous son of Sampson Samuel and his wife Lydia, née Lyons. Samuel arrived in Australia on 25 August 1832 aboard The Brothers with his mother to meet with Samuel's brother, Lewis, and their uncle, Samuel Lyons, who had arrived in colonial New South Wales a few years earlier. Educated at schools run by W. T Cape, Samuel was initially employed at his uncles' accounting house, before he and his brother formed their own mercantile firm.

After purchasing 190,000 acres (77,000 ha) of land at Bathurst, he abandoned pastoral interests following the 1851 gold rush and business interests became his main focus.

He married Henrietta Matilda Goldsmith-Levien on 16 December 1857 and had two daughters and two sons. He married Sarah Louisa Isaacs on 31 October 1877 (in Auckland, New Zealand) and had one son.

== Political career ==
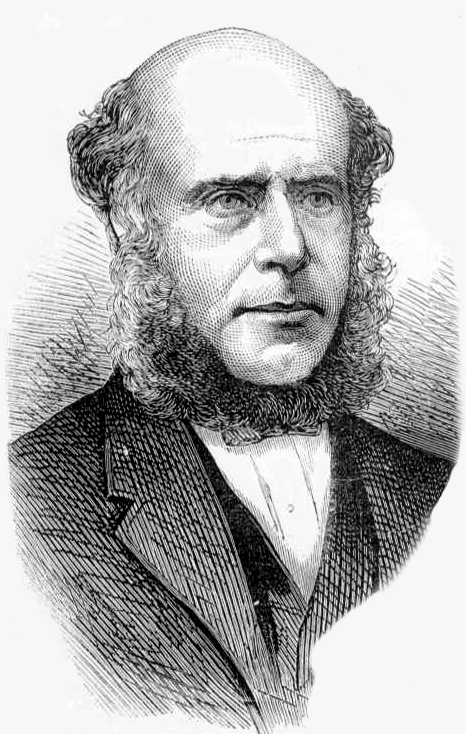
Saul Samuel by Samuel Calvert - Illustrated Australian News (1874)

In 1854, Samuel became an elective Member of the first Legislative Council of New South Wales, representing the Counties of Roxburgh and Wellington between 1854 and 1856. Elected to the first responsible government, Samuel became a member of the Legislative Assembly representing the Counties of Roxburgh and Wellington from 1854 until 1856. Re-elected to the Assembly in June 1859 and then again in November 1859, Samuel served as member for Orange until 1860. Samuel became member for Wellington in 1862, serving until 1869, and then again as member for Orange, serving between 1869 until 1872, before briefly serving as member for East Sydney during 1872. In 1872, Samuel was appointed a Life Member of Legislative Council, where he sat until he retirement from parliamentary life in 1880.

=== Treasurer and Postmaster General ===
Samuel served as Colonial Treasurer three times during his parliamentary career including in the Forster ministry between 1859 and 1860, the fourth Cowper ministry between 1865 and 1866, and the second Robertson ministry between 1868 and 1870. Samuel resigned as Treasurer in the Cowper ministry after his budget proposals for trade licences and increased duties on tea and sugar had been defeated. In 1870, at the Intercolonial Conference in Melbourne, Samuel proposed intercolonial free trade to settle the border customs dispute. He hoped to abolish ad valorem duties but his plans for a tax on incomes of over £200 were bitterly contested and led to the downfall of the government in December 1870.

Between 1872 and 1880, Samuel served as Postmaster-General on three occasions under Premier, Henry Parkes, including the first (1872–1875), second (1877), and third (1878–1883) ministries. During this period, Samuel established the General Post Office and negotiated a subsidized mail service from England to Australia via USA.

== Mining involvement ==
In 1875, he reopened a copper mine at Coombing Park near Carcoar—in partnership with Lewis Lloyd—and in 1876, a copper smelter was built close to it.

== Career after politics ==
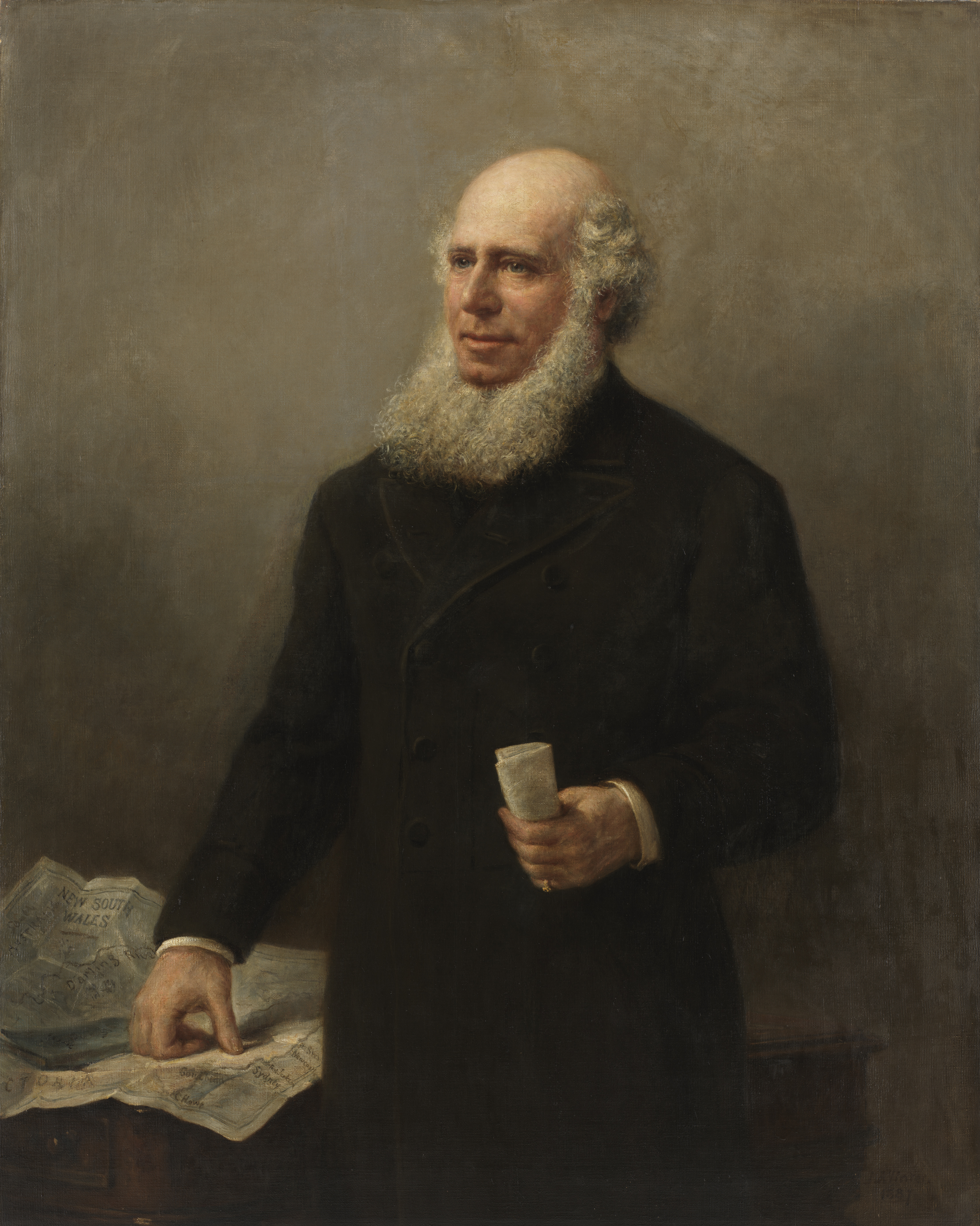
Sir Saul Samuel, Agent General for New South Wales, 1887, by Vinter

After politics, Samuel pursued his business interests including Chairman of Australian Mutual Provident Society and of Pacific Fire and Marine Insurance Company. Between 1880 and 1897, Samuel was the sixth Agent-General for New South Wales in London and was a director of Mercantile Bank of Sydney. An energetic, shrewd and efficient representative, he helped negotiate government loans and by 1885 claimed that he had raised £30 million. He fostered assisted immigration, negotiated with the Peninsular and Oriental and the Orient shipping companies for weekly mail services to the colony and in 1885 about the New South Wales Contingent to the Sudan. He was a commissioner for New South Wales at the 1883 Amsterdam Exhibition and represented the colony at the 1887 Colonial Conference in London. In 1891 he also represented Queensland at the Postal Convention in Vienna.

He was active in Jewish affairs, including the Board of Management of York Street Synagogue. On 26 January 1875 he laid the foundation stone for the Great Synagogue in Elizabeth Street, Sydney, and was later its president.

Samuel was invested as a Companion of the Order of St Michael and St George (CMG) in 1874, and was elevated as a Knight Commander (KCMG) in 1882. He was made a Privy Councillor in 1884, was invested of a Companion of the Order of the Bath in 1886 in recognition of his services in connection with the Colonial and Indian Exhibition, and was created baronet in 1886.

Parliament of New South Wales
Political offices
Preceded by Elias Weekes	Colonial Treasurer; 1859 – 1860	Succeeded by Elias Weekes
Preceded by Thomas Smart	Colonial Treasurer; 1865 – 1866	Succeeded by Marshall Burdekin
Preceded by Geoffrey Eagar	Colonial Treasurer; 1868 – 1870	Succeeded by George Lord
Preceded by George Lloyd	Postmaster-General; 1872 – 1875	Succeeded by John Davies
Dormant Title last held by John Plunkett	Vice-President of the Executive Council; 1872 – 1875	Dormant Title next held by Joseph Docker
Preceded by Joseph Docker	Representative of the Government in the Legislative Council; 1872 – 1873	Succeeded by Joseph Innes
Preceded by John Burns	Postmaster-General; Mar – Aug 1877	Succeeded by John Davies
Preceded by Joseph Docker	Representative of the Government in the Legislative Council; Mar – Aug 1877	Succeeded by Joseph Docker
Preceded by John Burns	Postmaster-General; 1878 – 1880	Succeeded by Francis Suttor
New South Wales Legislative Council
Preceded by William Suttor Sr.	Member for Counties of Roxburgh and Wellington; 1854 – 1856	Council abolished
New South Wales Legislative Assembly
New district	Member for Orange; 1859 – 1860	Succeeded by John Peisley
Preceded by Silvanus Daniel	Member for Wellington; 1862 – 1869	Succeeded by Gerald Spring
Preceded by George McKay	Member for Orange; 1869 – 1872	Succeeded by Harris Nelson
Preceded by David Buchanan	Member for East Sydney; 1872; With: James Neale; Henry Parkes; John Macintosh	Succeeded by George Oakes
Baronetage of the United Kingdom
New creation	Baronet (of Nevern Square); 1898 – 1900	Succeeded by Edward Samuel
