= Electoral district of East Sydney =

Former state electoral district of New South Wales, Australia

East Sydney New South Wales—Legislative Assembly
- State: New South Wales
- Created: 1859
- Abolished: 1894
- Namesake: East Sydney, New South Wales
- Demographic: Urban

East Sydney was an electoral district for the Legislative Assembly, in the Australian colony of New South Wales created in 1859 from part of the Electoral district of Sydney City, covering the eastern part of the current Sydney central business district, Woolloomooloo, Potts Point, Elizabeth Bay and Darlinghurst, bordered by George Street to the east, Boundary Street to the west, and, from the creation of South Sydney in 1880, Liverpool Street and Oxford Street, to the south. It elected four members simultaneously, with voters casting four votes and the first four candidates being elected. For the 1894 election, it was replaced by the single-member electorates of Sydney-King, Sydney-Fitzroy and Sydney-Bligh.

== Members for East Sydney ==
Member	Party	Period	Member	Party	Period	Member	Party	Period	Member	Party	Period
Charles Cowper	None	1859–1859	John Black	None	1859–1860	Henry Parkes	None	1859–1861	James Martin	None	1859–1860
Peter Faucett	None	1860–1860	John Black	None	1859–1860	Henry Parkes	None	1859–1861	James Martin	None	1859–1860
Charles Cowper	None	1860–1867	Robert Stewart	None	1860–1864	Henry Parkes	None	1859–1861	John Caldwell	None	1860–1866
Charles Cowper	None	1860–1867	Robert Stewart	None	1860–1864	William Forster	None	1861–1864	John Caldwell	None	1860–1866
Charles Cowper	None	1860–1867	James Hart	None	1864–1869	James Neale	None	1864–1869	John Caldwell	None	1860–1866
Charles Cowper	None	1860–1867	James Hart	None	1864–1869	James Neale	None	1864–1869	Robert Stewart	None	1866–1869
Marshall Burdekin	None	1867–1869	James Hart	None	1864–1869	James Neale	None	1864–1869	Robert Stewart	None	1866–1869
George King	None	1869–1872	David Buchanan	None	1869–1872	Henry Parkes	None	1869–1870	James Martin	None	1869–1872
George King	None	1869–1872	David Buchanan	None	1869–1872	Bowie Wilson	None	1870–1872	James Martin	None	1869–1872
James Neale	None	1872–1874	Saul Samuel	None	1872–1872	Henry Parkes	None	1872–1877	John Macintosh	None	1872–1880
James Neale	None	1872–1874	George Oakes	None	1872–1874	Henry Parkes	None	1872–1877	John Macintosh	None	1872–1880
Charles Moore	None	1874–1874	George Oakes	None	1872–1874	Henry Parkes	None	1872–1877	John Macintosh	None	1872–1880
John Davies	None	1874–1880	Alexander Stuart	None	1874–1879	Henry Parkes	None	1872–1877	John Macintosh	None	1872–1880
John Davies	None	1874–1880	Alexander Stuart	None	1874–1879	James Greenwood	None	1877–1880	John Macintosh	None	1872–1880
John Davies	None	1874–1880	Arthur Renwick	None	1879–1882	James Greenwood	None	1877–1880	John Macintosh	None	1872–1880
George Reid	None	1880–1884	Arthur Renwick	None	1879–1882	Henry Parkes	None	1880–1882	Henry Dangar	None	1880–1882
George Reid	None	1880–1884	Edmund Barton	None	1882–1887	John McElhone	None	1882–1883	George Griffiths	None	1882–1885
George Reid	None	1880–1884	Edmund Barton	None	1882–1887	Henry Copeland	None	1883–1887	George Griffiths	None	1882–1885
Sydney Burdekin	None	1884–1887	Edmund Barton	None	1882–1887	Henry Copeland	None	1883–1887	George Griffiths	None	1882–1885
Sydney Burdekin	None	1884–1887	Edmund Barton	None	1882–1887	Henry Copeland	None	1883–1887	George Reid	None	1885–1887
Sydney Burdekin	Free Trade	1887–1891	John Street	Free Trade	1887–1891	William McMillan	Free Trade	1887–1894	George Reid	Free Trade	1887–1894
Sydney Burdekin	Free Trade	1887–1891	Walter Bradley	Protectionist	1891–1891	William McMillan	Free Trade	1887–1894	George Reid	Free Trade	1887–1894
Varney Parkes	Free Trade	1891–1894	Edmund Barton	Protectionist	1891–1894	William McMillan	Free Trade	1887–1894	George Reid	Free Trade	1887–1894

== Election results ==
1891 New South Wales colonial election: East Sydney Wednesday 17 June
Party	Candidate	Votes	%	±%
Free Trade	William McMillan (re-elected 1)	3,713	19.2	
Protectionist	Edmund Barton (elected 2)	3,535	18.3	
Free Trade	Varney Parkes (elected 3)	3,343	17.3	
Ind. Free Trade	George Reid (re-elected 4)	2,946	15.2	
Protectionist	William Manning	2,260	11.7	
Labour	William Grantham	2,241	11.6	
Protectionist	Walter Bradley	1,328	6.9	
Total formal votes		19,366	99.7	
Informal votes		65	0.3	
Turnout		6,475	64.5	
Free Trade hold 2				
Protectionist hold 1				
Member changed to Ind. Free Trade from Free Trade				

Walter Bradley (Protectionist) won a seat at the 1891 East Sydney by-election and Edmund Barton (Protectionist) held it at this election. George Reid whilst a Free Trader, did not support the Free Trade government of Sir Henry Parkes.
