= Electoral results for the district of Monaro =

Elections in New South Wales, Australia

Monaro, also known as Maneroo (1856–58), Monara (1858–1879) and Manaro (1894–1904), an electoral district of the Legislative Assembly in the Australian state of New South Wales, has had two incarnations, from 1858 to 1920 and from 1927 to the present.

== Members ==
First incarnation (1858–1920)
1856–1880, 1 member
Member	Party	Term			
Daniel Egan	None	1856–1859			
Alexander Hamilton	None	1859–1860			
Thomas Garrett	None	1860–1864			
James Martin	None	1864–1865			
William Grahame	None	1865–1869			
Daniel Egan	None	1870–1870			
James Hart	None	1870–1872			
William Grahame	None	1872–1874			
Alexander Montague	None	1875–1877			
John Murphy	None	1877–1880			
1880–1894, 2 members
Member	Party	Term	Member	Party	Term
Henry Badgery	None	1880–1885	Robert Tooth	None	1880–1884
Henry Badgery	None	1880–1885	David Ryrie	None	1884–1885
Henry Dawson	None	1885–1887	Harold Stephen	None	1885–1887
Henry Dawson	Protectionist	1887–1894	Thomas O'Mara	Ind. Protectionist	1887–1889
Henry Dawson	Protectionist	1887–1894	Harold Stephen	Protectionist	1889–1889
Henry Dawson	Protectionist	1887–1894	Gus Miller	Protectionist	1889–1894
1894–1920, 1 member
Member	Party	Term			
Gus Miller	Protectionist	1894–1901			
Gus Miller	Labour	1901–1918			
John Bailey	Labor	1918–1920			
Second incarnation (1927–present)
1927–present 1 member
Member	Party	Term			
William Hedges	Country	1927–1941			
John Seiffert	Labor	1941–1950			
John Seiffert	Independent Labor	1950–1953			
John Seiffert	Labor	1953–1965			
Steve Mauger	Liberal	1965–1976			
John Akister	Labor	1976–1988			
Peter Cochran	National	1988–1999			
Peter Webb	National	1999–2003			
Steve Whan	Labor	2003–2011			
John Barilaro	National	2011–2021			
Nichole Overall	National	2022–2023			
Steve Whan	Labor	2023–present			

== Election results ==
=== Elections in the 2020s ===
==== 2023 ====
2023 New South Wales state election: Monaro
Party	Candidate	Votes	%	±%
National	Nichole Overall	19,890	39.1	−13.2
Labor	Steve Whan	19,401	38.1	+11.0
Greens	Jenny Goldie	3,924	7.7	−0.2
Shooters, Fishers, Farmers	Chris Pryor	3,077	6.1	−1.7
Independent	Andrew Thaler	1,855	3.6	+3.6
Legalise Cannabis	Josie Tanson	1,722	3.4	+3.4
Sustainable Australia	James Holgate	987	1.9	+1.9
Total formal votes		50,856	97.5	+0.1
Informal votes		1,313	2.5	−0.1
Turnout		52,169	87.7	−0.2
Two-party-preferred result
Labor	Steve Whan	23,757	52.3	+13.9
National	Nichole Overall	21,676	47.7	−13.9
Labor gain from National		Swing	+13.9	

==== 2022 by-election ====
2022 Monaro state by-election
Party	Candidate	Votes	%	±%
National	Nichole Overall	21,728	45.96	−6.35
Labor	Bryce Wilson	15,102	31.95	+4.78
Greens	Catherine Moore	4,178	8.84	+0.92
Independent	Andrew Thaler	2,986	6.32	+3.83
Sustainable Australia	James Holgate	1,920	4.06	+4.06
Animal Justice	Frankie Seymour	1,361	2.88	+0.54
Total formal votes		47,275	97.76	+0.46
Informal votes		1,081	2.24	−0.46
Turnout		48,356	83.40	−8.43
Two-party-preferred result
National	Nichole Overall	23,474	55.21	−6.41
Labor	Bryce Wilson	19,055	44.80	+6.41
National hold		Swing	−6.41	

=== Elections in the 2010s ===
==== 2019 ====
2019 New South Wales state election: Monaro
Party	Candidate	Votes	%	±%
National	John Barilaro	25,868	52.31	+3.58
Labor	Bryce Wilson	13,431	27.16	−13.44
Greens	Peter Marshall	3,913	7.91	+0.08
Shooters, Fishers, Farmers	Mick Holton	3,848	7.78	+7.78
Independent	Andrew Thaler	1,229	2.49	+2.49
Animal Justice	Frankie Seymour	1,159	2.34	+2.34
Total formal votes		49,448	97.42	+0.03
Informal votes		1,310	2.58	−0.03
Turnout		50,758	89.13	−0.30
Two-party-preferred result
National	John Barilaro	27,723	61.61	+9.08
Labor	Bryce Wilson	17,276	38.39	−9.08
National hold		Swing	+9.08	

==== 2015 ====
2015 New South Wales state election: Monaro
Party	Candidate	Votes	%	±%
National	John Barilaro	22,518	48.7	+1.7
Labor	Steve Whan	18,761	40.6	−0.5
Greens	Peter Marshall	3,620	7.8	+0.1
No Land Tax	Leslie Dinham	691	1.5	+1.5
Christian Democrats	Joy Horton	613	1.3	−0.0
Total formal votes		46,203	97.4	+0.2
Informal votes		1,237	2.6	−0.2
Turnout		47,440	89.4	−0.5
Two-party-preferred result
National	John Barilaro	23,314	52.5	+0.5
Labor	Steve Whan	21,071	47.5	−0.5
National hold		Swing	+0.5	

==== 2011 ====
2011 New South Wales state election: Monaro
Party	Candidate	Votes	%	±%
National	John Barilaro	21,134	47.1	+7.8
Labor	Steve Whan	18,381	41.0	−6.9
Greens	Paul Cockram	3,524	7.9	−2.1
Independent	Kingsley Warburton	1,218	2.7	+2.7
Christian Democrats	Deanne Graf	618	1.4	+1.4
Total formal votes		44,875	97.6	+0.1
Informal votes		1,083	2.4	−0.1
Turnout		45,958	91.8	
Two-party-preferred result
National	John Barilaro	21,918	52.1	+8.4
Labor	Steve Whan	20,178	47.9	−8.4
National gain from Labor		Swing	+8.4	

=== Elections in the 2000s ===
==== 2007 ====
2007 New South Wales state election: Monaro
Party	Candidate	Votes	%	±%
Labor	Steve Whan	19,769	47.9	+1.6
National	David Madew	16,244	39.3	−2.3
Greens	Catherine Moore	4,123	10.0	+2.1
Independent	Frank Fragiacomo	1,155	2.8	+2.8
Total formal votes		41,291	97.5	−0.2
Informal votes		1,050	2.5	+0.2
Turnout		42,341	90.9	
Two-party-preferred result
Labor	Steve Whan	21,978	56.3	+1.9
National	David Madew	17,060	43.7	−1.9
Labor hold		Swing	+1.9	

==== 2003 ====
2003 New South Wales state election: Monaro
Party	Candidate	Votes	%	±%
Labor	Steve Whan	18,953	45.1	+13.4
National	Peter Webb	17,909	42.7	+20.5
Greens	Catherine Moore	3,359	8.0	+3.3
Independent	Carol Atkins	1,184	2.8	+2.8
One Nation	Ian Hale	584	1.4	−6.1
Total formal votes		41,989	97.8	+0.0
Informal votes		960	2.2	−0.0
Turnout		42,949	91.4	
Two-party-preferred result
Labor	Steve Whan	21,291	53.3	+3.5
National	Peter Webb	18,634	46.7	−3.5
Labor gain from National		Swing	+3.5	

=== Elections in the 1990s ===
==== 1999 ====
1999 New South Wales state election: Monaro
Party	Candidate	Votes	%	±%
Labor	John Durst	12,076	31.7	+5.2
National	Peter Webb	8,477	22.2	−35.8
Liberal	Ian Marjason	7,521	19.7	+18.9
Independent	Frank Pangallo	4,822	12.6	+12.6
One Nation	Matthew Swift	2,855	7.5	+7.5
Greens	Catherine Moore	1,809	4.7	−2.9
Independent	Frank Fragiacomo	419	1.1	+1.1
Independent	Earle Keegel	145	0.4	+0.4
Total formal votes		38,124	97.7	+2.0
Informal votes		885	2.3	−2.0
Turnout		39,009	92.4	
Two-party-preferred result
National	Peter Webb	15,175	50.2	−16.1
Labor	John Durst	15,047	49.8	+16.1
National hold		Swing	−16.1	

==== 1995 ====
1995 New South Wales state election: Monaro
Party	Candidate	Votes	%	±%
National	Peter Cochran	20,641	58.8	−0.4
Labor	Bob Kemp	9,339	26.6	−5.4
Greens	Catherine Moore	2,657	7.6	+7.6
Call to Australia	John Ferguson	1,351	3.9	+3.8
Democrats	Mitch Tulau	1,103	3.1	−5.6
Total formal votes		35,091	95.8	+5.8
Informal votes		1,556	4.2	−5.8
Turnout		36,647	92.9	
Two-party-preferred result
National	Peter Cochran	22,267	66.2	+3.6
Labor	Bob Kemp	11,346	33.8	−3.6
National hold		Swing	+3.6	

==== 1991 ====
1991 New South Wales state election: Monaro
Party	Candidate	Votes	%	±%
National	Peter Cochran	17,397	59.2	+31.7
Labor	Penny Lockwood	9,417	32.0	−4.7
Democrats	Bob Patrech	2,577	8.8	+8.6
Total formal votes		29,391	90.0	−7.3
Informal votes		3,265	10.0	+7.3
Turnout		32,656	92.2	
Two-party-preferred result
National	Peter Cochran	17,977	62.7	+4.9
Labor	Penny Lockwood	10,698	37.3	−4.9
National hold		Swing	+4.9	

=== Elections in the 1980s ===
==== 1988 ====
1988 New South Wales state election: Monaro
Party	Candidate	Votes	%	±%
Labor	John Akister	12,399	41.5	−15.6
National	Peter Cochran	9,403	31.5	+10.5
Liberal	Chris Handbury	8,048	27.0	+6.1
Total formal votes		29,850	97.4	−0.4
Informal votes		809	2.6	+0.4
Turnout		30,659	90.8	
Two-party-preferred result
National	Peter Cochran	15,703	53.9	+11.9
Labor	John Akister	13,416	46.1	−11.9
National gain from Labor		Swing	+11.9	

==== 1984 ====
1984 New South Wales state election: Monaro
Party	Candidate	Votes	%	±%
Labor	John Akister	17,403	55.3	−4.5
Liberal	John Munro	11,800	37.5	+7.1
National	Ronald Formann	2,245	7.1	−1.1
Total formal votes		31,448	97.9	0.0
Informal votes		678	2.1	0.0
Turnout		32,126	89.7	−0.1
Two-party-preferred result
Labor	John Akister		55.9	−5.5
Liberal	John Munro		44.1	+5.5
Labor hold		Swing	−5.5	

==== 1981 ====
1981 New South Wales state election: Monaro
Party	Candidate	Votes	%	±%
Labor	John Akister	17,395	59.8	+3.4
Liberal	David Barton	8,852	30.4	+9.6
National Country	Susan Mitchell	2,384	8.2	−11.1
Independent	Christopher Kleiss	475	1.6	+1.6
Total formal votes		29,106	97.9	
Informal votes		621	2.1	
Turnout		29,727	89.8	
Two-party-preferred result
Labor	John Akister	17,495	61.4	+4.6
Liberal	David Barton	11,008	38.6	−4.6
Labor hold		Swing	+4.6	

=== Elections in the 1970s ===
==== 1978 ====
1978 New South Wales state election: Monaro
Party	Candidate	Votes	%	±%
Labor	John Akister	13,234	56.4	+7.8
Liberal	John Ballesty	4,884	20.8	−6.7
National Country	Thomas Barry	4,529	19.3	−4.6
Independent	Graham Edwards	821	3.5	+3.5
Total formal votes		23,468	97.9	−0.5
Informal votes		497	2.1	+0.5
Turnout		23,965	91.4	0.0
Two-party-preferred result
Labor	John Akister	13,921	59.3	+7.8
Liberal	John Ballesty	9,547	40.7	−7.8
Labor hold		Swing	+7.8	

==== 1976 ====
1976 New South Wales state election: Monaro
Party	Candidate	Votes	%	±%
Labor	John Akister	11,196	48.6	+6.6
Liberal	Valerie Marland	6,330	27.5	−26.7
Country	Thomas Barry	5,519	23.9	+23.9
Total formal votes		23,045	98.4	+0.9
Informal votes		372	1.6	−0.9
Turnout		23,417	91.4	+0.1
Two-party-preferred result
Labor	John Akister	11,876	51.5	+8.8
Liberal	Valerie Marland	11,169	48.5	−8.8
Labor gain from Liberal		Swing	+8.8	

==== 1973 ====
1973 New South Wales state election: Monaro
Party	Candidate	Votes	%	±%
Liberal	Steve Mauger	10,876	54.2	+1.0
Labor	Margaret Gleeson	8,420	42.0	−4.8
Democratic Labor	Gerald O'Shaughnessy	776	3.9	+3.9
Total formal votes		20,072	97.5	
Informal votes		514	2.5	
Turnout		20,586	91.3	
Two-party-preferred result
Liberal	Steve Mauger	11,497	57.3	+4.1
Labor	Margaret Gleeson	8,575	42.7	−4.1
Liberal hold		Swing	+4.1	

==== 1971 ====
1971 New South Wales state election: Monaro
Party	Candidate	Votes	%	±%
Liberal	Steve Mauger	9,158	53.2	−1.7
Labor	Alfred Kingston	8,044	46.8	+1.7
Total formal votes		17,202	98.1	
Informal votes		330	1.9	
Turnout		17,532	92.3	
Liberal hold		Swing	−1.7	

=== Elections in the 1960s ===
==== 1968 ====
1968 New South Wales state election: Monaro
Party	Candidate	Votes	%	±%
Liberal	Steve Mauger	11,572	56.1	+18.6
Labor	David Lowrey	9,049	43.9	+0.3
Total formal votes		20,621	97.9	
Informal votes		439	2.1	
Turnout		21,060	93.3	
Liberal hold		Swing	+2.7	

==== 1965 ====
1965 New South Wales state election: Monaro
Party	Candidate	Votes	%	±%
Labor	John Seiffert Jr	7,906	46.6	−10.9
Liberal	Steve Mauger	5,862	34.5	−8.0
Country	Keith Phillis	3,204	18.9	+18.9
Total formal votes		16,972	97.9	−1.0
Informal votes		371	2.1	+1.0
Turnout		17,343	94.4	+1.2
Two-party-preferred result
Liberal	Steve Mauger	8,620	50.8	+8.3
Labor	John Seiffert Jr	8,352	49.2	−8.3
Liberal gain from Labor		Swing	+8.3	

The sitting member John Seiffert Sr (Labor) died in January 1965.

==== 1962 ====
1962 New South Wales state election: Monaro
Party	Candidate	Votes	%	±%
Labor	John Seiffert	9,217	57.5	−0.1
Liberal	Jack McArthur	6,825	42.5	+0.1
Total formal votes		16,042	98.9	
Informal votes		178	1.1	
Turnout		16,220	93.2	
Labor hold		Swing	−0.1	

=== Elections in the 1950s ===
==== 1959 ====
1959 New South Wales state election: Monaro
Party	Candidate	Votes	%	±%
Labor	John Seiffert	8,890	57.6	
Liberal	Mark Flanagan	6,540	42.4	
Total formal votes		15,430	98.5	
Informal votes		242	1.5	
Turnout		15,672	93.2	
Labor hold		Swing		

==== 1956 ====
1956 New South Wales state election: Monaro
Party	Candidate	Votes	%	±%
Labor	John Seiffert	8,709	58.4	−6.3
Liberal	Ernest Smith	5,604	37.5	+2.2
Country	Frederick Von Nida	613	4.1	+4.1
Total formal votes		14,926	98.9	+0.8
Informal votes		161	1.1	−0.8
Turnout		15,087	93.0	−1.3
Two-party-preferred result
Labor	John Seiffert	8,770	58.7	−6.0
Liberal	Ernest Smith	8,156	41.3	+6.0
Labor hold		Swing	−6.0	

==== 1953 ====
1953 New South Wales state election: Monaro
Party	Candidate	Votes	%	±%
Labor	John Seiffert	9,002	64.7	
Liberal	Ernest Smith	4,912	35.3	
Total formal votes		13,914	98.1	
Informal votes		272	1.9	
Turnout		14,186	94.3	
Member changed to Labor from Independent Labor		Swing		

- Seiffert had been allowed to re-join the Labor Party after being re-elected as an Independent Labor MP in 1950.

==== 1950 ====
1950 New South Wales state election: Monaro
Party	Candidate	Votes	%	±%
Independent Labor	John Seiffert	7,579	57.2	
Liberal	William Keys	5,675	42.8	
Total formal votes		13,254	99.2	
Informal votes		111	0.8	
Turnout		13,365	93.4	
Member changed to Independent Labor from Labor		Swing	N/A	

The sitting member was John Seiffert who had been elected as a Labor candidate, however he was disendorsed as a result of voting in the election for the Legislative Council and stood as an Independent labor candidate.

=== Elections in the 1940s ===
==== 1947 ====
1947 New South Wales state election: Monaro
Party	Candidate	Votes	%	±%
Labor	John Seiffert	8,723	67.0	
Liberal	William Bruce	4,302	33.0	
Total formal votes		13,025	98.2	
Informal votes		241	1.8	
Turnout		13,266	94.9	
Labor hold		Swing	N/A	

==== 1944 ====
1944 New South Wales state election: Monaro
Party	Candidate	Votes	%	±%
Labor	John Seiffert	unopposed		
Labor hold				

==== 1941 ====
1941 New South Wales state election: Monaro
Party	Candidate	Votes	%	±%
Labor	John Seiffert	6,852	50.7	
Country	William Hedges	6,671	49.3	
Total formal votes		13,523	99.0	
Informal votes		135	1.0	
Turnout		13,658	94.5	
Labor gain from Country		Swing		

=== Elections in the 1930s ===
==== 1938 ====
1938 New South Wales state election: Monaro
Party	Candidate	Votes	%	±%
Country	William Hedges	7,570	57.6	+0.7
Labor	Clarence Moore	5,567	42.4	−0.7
Total formal votes		13,137	98.7	0.0
Informal votes		168	1.3	0.0
Turnout		13,305	95.9	−1.2
Country hold		Swing	+0.7	

==== 1935 ====
1935 New South Wales state election: Monaro
Party	Candidate	Votes	%	±%
Country	William Hedges	7,306	56.9	−0.6
Labor (NSW)	Clarence Moore	5,526	43.1	+10.8
Total formal votes		12,832	98.7	+1.5
Informal votes		165	1.3	−1.5
Turnout		12,997	97.1	−0.7
Country hold		Swing	N/A	

==== 1932 ====
1932 New South Wales state election: Monaro
Party	Candidate	Votes	%	±%
Country	William Hedges	7,119	57.5	+7.0
Labor (NSW)	James Bollard	4,005	32.3	−17.2
Federal Labor	John Cusack	782	6.3	+6.3
Independent	Douglas Norris	482	3.9	+3.9
Total formal votes		12,388	97.2	−1.6
Informal votes		355	2.8	+1.6
Turnout		12,743	97.8	+0.4
Country hold		Swing	N/A	

- Preferences were not distributed.

==== 1930 ====
1930 New South Wales state election: Monaro
Party	Candidate	Votes	%	±%
Country	William Hedges	6,292	50.5	
Labor	Paddy Stokes	6,156	49.5	
Total formal votes		12,448	98.8	
Informal votes		151	1.2	
Turnout		12,599	97.4	
Country hold		Swing		

=== Elections in the 1920s ===
==== 1927 ====
1927 New South Wales state election: Monaro
Party	Candidate	Votes	%	±%
Country	William Hedges	6,614	52.3	
Labor	Paddy Stokes (defeated)	6,020	47.7	
Total formal votes		12,634	98.3	
Informal votes		223	1.7	
Turnout		12,857	84.6	
Country win		(new seat)		

District recreated

==== 1920–1927 ====
District abolished

=== Elections in the 1910s ===
==== 1918 by-election ====
1918 Monaro by-election Saturday 23 November
Party	Candidate	Votes	%	±%
Labor	John Bailey	3,683	63.51	+0.89
Nationalist	Patrick Sullivan	2,005	34.57	−2.81
Independent	Henry Hungerford	96	1.66	
Independent Labor	Claude Miller (Note: Claude Miller was the son of Gus Miller, the former member, and withdrew from the campaign after nominating.)	15	0.26	
Total formal votes		5,799	98.81	
Informal votes		70	1.19	
Turnout		5,869	62.64	
Labor hold		Swing	+0.89	

Gus Miller (Labor) died.

==== 1917 ====
This section is an excerpt from 1917 New South Wales state election § Monaro

1917 New South Wales state election: Monaro
Party	Candidate	Votes	%	±%
Labor	Gus Miller	3,947	62.6	+6.0
Nationalist	John Perkins	2,356	37.4	−5.1
Total formal votes		6,303	99.2	+2.0
Informal votes		52	0.8	−2.0
Turnout		6,355	65.7	−6.8
Labor hold		Swing	+6.0	

==== 1913 ====
1913 New South Wales state election: Monaro
Party	Candidate	Votes	%	±%
Labor	Gus Miller	3,836	56.6	
Liberal Reform	Ernest Quodling (Note: Also endorsed by Farmers and Settlers.)	2,880	42.5	
Independent	James Hart	66	1.0	
Total formal votes		6,782	97.2	
Informal votes		192	2.8	
Turnout		6,974	72.5	
Labor hold				

==== 1910 ====
This section is an excerpt from 1910 New South Wales state election § Monaro

1910 New South Wales state election: Monaro
Party	Candidate	Votes	%	±%
Labour	Gus Miller	3,565	66.2	
Liberal Reform	William Wright	1,205	33.8	
Total formal votes		3,655	97.5	
Informal votes		90	2.5	
Turnout		3,655	57.5	
Labour hold				

=== Elections in the 1900s ===
==== 1907 ====
This section is an excerpt from 1907 New South Wales state election § Monaro

1907 New South Wales state election: Monaro
Party	Candidate	Votes	%	±%
Labour	Gus Miller	1,847	67.5	
Liberal Reform	Edward Harris	888	32.5	
Total formal votes		2,735	94.5	
Informal votes		159	5.5	
Turnout		2,894	48.5	
Labour hold				

==== 1904 ====
This section is an excerpt from 1904 New South Wales state election § Monaro

1904 New South Wales state election: Monaro
Party	Candidate	Votes	%	±%
Labour	Gus Miller	2,357	60.2	
Liberal Reform	John Perkins	1,116	28.5	
Independent	Henry Dawson	443	11.3	
Total formal votes		3,916	99.1	
Informal votes		37	0.9	
Turnout		3,953	65.2	
Labour hold				

Monaro was expanded to include parts of parts of Queanbeyan and the abolished seat of Eden-Bombala. The member for Monaro was Gus Miller (Labour). The member for Queanbeyan was Edward O'Sullivan (Progressive) who successfully contested Belmore. The member for Eden-Bombala was William Wood (Liberal Reform) who successfully contested Bega.

==== 1901 ====
This section is an excerpt from 1901 New South Wales state election § Manaro

1901 New South Wales state election: Manaro
Party	Candidate	Votes	%	±%
Labour	Gus Miller	967	67.5	+4.9
Liberal Reform	John Sellar	466	32.5	
Total formal votes		1,433	99.2	+1.9
Informal votes		11	0.8	−1.9
Turnout		1,444	62.5	+11.9
Member changed to Labour from Progressive				

==== 1898 ====
This section is an excerpt from 1898 New South Wales colonial election § Manaro

1898 New South Wales colonial election: Manaro
Party	Candidate	Votes	%	±%
National Federal	Gus Miller	694	62.6	
Ind. Free Trade	Granville Ryrie	402	36.3	
Independent	Hugh MacDonnell	13	1.2	
Total formal votes		1,109	97.4	
Informal votes		30	2.6	
Turnout		1,139	50.6	
National Federal hold				

==== 1895 ====
This section is an excerpt from 1895 New South Wales colonial election § Manaro

1895 New South Wales colonial election: Manaro
Party	Candidate	Votes	%	±%
Protectionist	Gus Miller	646	67.3	
Free Trade	Edwin Tucker	314	32.7	
Total formal votes		960	99.3	
Informal votes		7	0.7	
Turnout		967	46.5	
Protectionist hold				

==== 1894 ====
This section is an excerpt from 1894 New South Wales colonial election § Manaro

1894 New South Wales colonial election: Manaro
Party	Candidate	Votes	%	±%
Protectionist	Gus Miller	772	48.8	
Ind. Protectionist	Charles Welch	290	18.3	
Free Trade	Granville Ryrie	276	17.4	
Protectionist	Henry Dawson	160	10.1	
Independent	John O'Brien	85	5.4	
Total formal votes		1,583	98.3	
Informal votes		28	1.7	
Turnout		1,611	77.4	
Protectionist win		(previously 2 members)		

==== 1891 ====
This section is an excerpt from 1891 New South Wales colonial election § Monaro

1891 New South Wales colonial election: Monaro Tuesday 30 June
Party	Candidate	Votes	%	±%
Protectionist	Henry Dawson (re-elected 1)	1,117	30.9	
Protectionist	Gus Miller (re-elected 2)	1,103	30.5	
Free Trade	Daniel O'Connor	800	22.1	
Protectionist	Charles Welch	595	16.5	
Total formal votes		3,615	99.5	
Informal votes		18	0.5	
Turnout		2,033	59.8	
Protectionist hold 2				

=== Elections in the 1880s ===
==== 1889 by-election ====
1889 Monaro by-election Tuesday 17 December
Party	Candidate	Votes	%	±%
Protectionist	Gus Miller (elected)	859	54.9	
Free Trade	David Myers	706	45.1	
Total formal votes		1,565	100.0	
Informal votes		0	0.0	
Turnout		1,565	42.3	
Protectionist hold				

Harold Stephen (Protectionist) died.

==== 1889 ====
This section is an excerpt from 1889 New South Wales colonial election § Monaro

1889 New South Wales colonial election: Monaro Thursday 7 February
Party	Candidate	Votes	%	±%
Protectionist	Henry Dawson (re-elected 1)	1,294	41.8	
Protectionist	Harold Stephen (elected 2)	1,033	33.3	
Free Trade	David Myers	771	24.9	
Total formal votes		3,098	99.6	
Informal votes		12	0.4	
Turnout		3,110	42.9	
Protectionist hold 1 and gain 1 from Ind. Protectionist				

One of the sitting members Thomas O'Mara (Independent Protectionist) unsuccessfully contested East Sydney. The other sitting member was Henry Dawson (Protectionist).

==== 1887 ====
This section is an excerpt from 1887 New South Wales colonial election § Monaro

1887 New South Wales colonial election: Monaro Friday 25 February
Party	Candidate	Votes	%	±%
Ind. Protectionist	Thomas O'Mara (elected 1)	1,148	38.0	
Protectionist	Henry Dawson (re-elected 2)	783	25.9	
Protectionist	Harold Stephen (defeated)	637	21.1	
Free Trade	Herbert Elles	453	15.0	
Total formal votes		3,021	99.6	
Informal votes		12	0.4	
Turnout		1,732	55.7	

==== 1885 ====
This section is an excerpt from 1885 New South Wales colonial election § Monaro

1885 New South Wales colonial election: Monaro Friday 30 October
Candidate	Votes	%
Henry Dawson (elected 1)	941	33.6
Harold Stephen (elected 2)	658	23.5
Thomas O'Mara (defeated)	447	15.9
H M Joseph	390	13.9
Henry Merrett	368	13.1
Total formal votes	2,804	99.2
Informal votes	22	0.8
Turnout	1,681	59.1

Thomas O'Mara was the sitting member for Tumut.

==== 1884 by-election ====
1884 Monaro by-election Friday 18 July
Candidate	Votes	%
David Ryrie (elected)	unopposed	

Robert Tooth resigned.

==== 1882 ====
This section is an excerpt from 1882 New South Wales colonial election § Monaro

1882 New South Wales colonial election: Monaro Thursday 14 December
Candidate	Votes	%
Henry Badgery (re-elected 1)	976	37.6
Robert Tooth (re-elected 2)	856	33.0
John Toohey	761	29.4
Total formal votes	2,593	98.9
Informal votes	29	1.1
Turnout	1,687	61.7

==== 1880 ====
This section is an excerpt from 1880 New South Wales colonial election § Monaro

1880 New South Wales colonial election: Monaro Thursday 2 December
Candidate	Votes	%
Henry Badgery (re-elected 1)	899	30.9
Robert Tooth (elected 2)	868	29.8
John Toohey	719	24.7
W T Cohen	426	14.6
Total formal votes	2,912	99.3
Informal votes	21	0.7
Turnout	1,754	67.7
	(1 new seat)	

The sitting member John Murphy did not contest the election. Henry Badgery was the member for East Maitland.

=== Elections in the 1870s ===
==== 1877 ====
This section is an excerpt from 1877 New South Wales colonial election § Monara

1877 New South Wales colonial election: Monara Friday 2 November
Candidate	Votes	%
John Murphy (elected)	768	59.6
Alexander Montague (defeated)	521	40.4
Total formal votes	1,289	100.0
Informal votes	0	0.0
Turnout	1,289	54.0

==== 1875 ====
This section is an excerpt from 1874-75 New South Wales colonial election § Monara

1874–75 New South Wales colonial election: Monara Tuesday 5 January 1875
Candidate	Votes	%
Alexander Montague (elected)	562	47.4
H M Joseph	502	42.3
Daniel O'Connell	123	10.4
Total formal votes	1,187	100.0
Informal votes	0	0.0
Turnout	1,187	56.1

==== 1872 ====
This section is an excerpt from 1872 New South Wales colonial election § Monara

1872 New South Wales colonial election: Monara Friday 15 March
Candidate	Votes	%
William Grahame (elected)	738	70.4
Abram Moriarty	310	29.6
Total formal votes	1,048	100.0
Informal votes	0	0.0
Turnout	1,050	55.6

==== 1870 by-election ====
1870 Monara by-election Thursday 17 November
Candidate	Votes	%
James Hart (elected)	465	52.1
Thomas Dawson	427	47.9
Total formal votes	892	100.0
Informal votes	0	0.0
Turnout	892	49.5

Daniel Egan died.

=== Elections in the 1860s ===
==== 1870 ====
This section is an excerpt from 1869-70 New South Wales colonial election § Monara

1869–70 New South Wales colonial election: Monara Tuesday 4 January 1870
Candidate	Votes	%
Daniel Egan (elected)	448	51.6
William Grahame (defeated)	420	48.4
Total formal votes	868	100.0
Informal votes	0	0.0
Turnout	868	54.5

==== 1865 by-election ====
1865 Monara by-election Thursday 30 March
Candidate	Votes	%
William Grahame (elected)	unopposed	

James Martin had been elected to 2 seats and resigned from Monara to represent The Lachlan.

==== 1864 ====
This section is an excerpt from 1864–65 New South Wales colonial election § Monara

1864–65 New South Wales colonial election: Monara Saturday 24 December 1864
Candidate	Votes	%
James Martin (elected)	333	50.8
William Grahame	227	34.6
William Brodribb	96	14.6
Total formal votes	656	100.0
Informal votes	0	0.0
Turnout	655	46.3

==== 1860 ====
This section is an excerpt from 1860 New South Wales colonial election § Monara

1860 New South Wales colonial election: Monara Tuesday 11 December
Candidate	Votes	%
Thomas Garrett (elected)	187	44.0
Patrick Clifford	158	37.2
Henry Kesterton	80	18.8
Total formal votes	425	100.0
Informal votes	0	0.0
Turnout	425	38.9

=== Elections in the 1850s ===
==== 1859 ====
This section is an excerpt from 1859 New South Wales colonial election § Monara

1859 New South Wales colonial election: Monara Thursday 30 June
Candidate	Votes	%
Alexander Hamilton (elected)	311	72.5
Daniel Egan (defeated)	118	27.5
Total formal votes	429	100.0
Informal votes	0	0.0
Turnout	429	45.7

Daniel Egan was elected for Eden.

==== 1858 ====
This section is an excerpt from 1858 New South Wales colonial election § Maneroo

1858 New South Wales colonial election: Maneroo 5 February
Candidate	Votes	%
Daniel Egan (re-elected)	196	68.3
George Hebden	91	31.7
Total formal votes	287	100.0
Informal votes	0	0.0
Turnout	287	60.8

==== 1856 ====
This section is an excerpt from 1856 New South Wales colonial election § Maneroo

1856 New South Wales colonial election: Maneroo
Candidate	Votes	%
Daniel Egan (elected)	unopposed	

Polling was scheduled to be conducted on 16 April 1856. Egan had represented Pastoral District of Maneroo in the old Legislative Council.
