= 1889 Monaro colonial by-election =

By-election in New South Wales, Australia

A by-election was held for the New South Wales Legislative Assembly electorate of Monaro on 17 December 1889 because of the death of Harold Stephen (Protectionist).

== Dates ==
Date	Event
30 November 1889	Harold Stephen died.
4 October 1889	Writ of election issued by the Speaker of the Legislative Assembly.
11 December 1889	Day of nomination
17 December 1889	Polling day
31 December 1889	Return of writ

== Candidates ==
- David Myers was a solicitor from Bombala who had been unsuccessful at the election in January 1889 by a margin of 262 votes (8.4%).
- Gus Miller was a journalist and the proprietor of the Cooma Express.

== Result ==
1889 Monaro by-election Tuesday 17 December
Party	Candidate	Votes	%	±%
Protectionist	Gus Miller (elected)	859	54.9	
Free Trade	David Myers	706	45.1	
Total formal votes		1,565	100.0	
Informal votes		0	0.0	
Turnout		1,565	42.3	
Protectionist hold				

== See also ==
- Electoral results for the district of Monaro
- List of New South Wales state by-elections
