= Tooth (surname) =

Tooth is a surname. Notable people with this surname include:

- Arthur Tooth (1839–1931), Church of England priest
- Charles Tooth (1831–1894), Anglican clergyman
- Dick Tooth (1929–2020), Australian rugby union player
- Douglas Tooth (1904–1982), Australian politician
- Howard Henry Tooth (1856–1925), British neurologist
- John Tooth (1803–1857), Australian brewer, founder of Tooth and Co.
- Liane Tooth (born 1962), Australian field hockey player
- Mary Tooth (1778–1843) British Methodist preacher
- Nicholas Tooth (1844–1913), foundry owner and Queensland politician
- Robert Tooth (1821–1893), British-born member of Tooths' brewery family in Sydney
- William Tooth (1823–1876), English-born Australian politician and pastoralist
- Lucas-Tooth baronets
  - Archibald Lucas-Tooth (1884–1918), 2nd baronet, son of Robert
  - Hugh Lucas-Tooth (1903–1985), Scottish politician
  - Robert Lucas-Tooth (1844–1915), Australian politician

== See also ==
- Tooth & Co., Sydney brewing company founded by the Tooth family
