= 1918 Monaro state by-election =

Election result for Monaro, New South Wales, Australia

A by-election was held in the New South Wales state electoral district of Monaro on 23 November 1918. The by-election was triggered by the death of Gus Miller (Labor).

== Result ==
1918 Monaro by-election Saturday 23 November
Party	Candidate	Votes	%	±%
Labor	John Bailey	3,683	63.51	+0.89
Nationalist	Patrick Sullivan	2,005	34.57	−2.81
Independent	Henry Hungerford	96	1.66	
Independent Labor	Claude Miller (Note: Claude Miller was the son of Gus Miller, the former member, and withdrew from the campaign after nominating.)	15	0.26	
Total formal votes		5,799	98.81	
Informal votes		70	1.19	
Turnout		5,869	62.64	
Labor hold		Swing	+0.89	

== See also ==
- Electoral results for the district of Monaro
- List of New South Wales state by-elections
