= 1884 Monaro colonial by-election =

By-election in New South Wales, Australia

A by-election was held in the New South Wales state electoral district of Monaro on 18 July 1884. No poll was held as David Ryrie was the only candidate nominated. The by-election was triggered by the resignation of Robert Tooth.

== Dates ==
Date	Event
8 July 1884	Robert Tooth resigned.
9 July 1884	Writ of election issued by the Speaker of the Legislative Assembly.
18 July 1884	Day of nomination at Cooma
24 July 1884	Polling day
2 August 1884	Return of writ

== Result ==
1884 Monaro by-election Friday 18 July
Candidate	Votes	%
David Ryrie (elected)	unopposed	
