= Andrew Thaler =

Australian politician

Cr. Andrew Thaler

Councillor of the Snowy Monaro Regional Council
- Incumbent
- Assumed office 14 September 2024

Personal details
- Born: Andrew Evan Thaler; 1972 or 1973 (age 53–54)
- Party: Independent
- Website: snowymonaro.com.au

Andrew Evan Thaler (born 1972 or 1973) is an Australian politician who since 2024 has been a councillor on the Snowy Monaro Regional Council.

Thaler is a perennial candidate, contesting the 2019 New South Wales state election in Monaro, 2022 Monaro state by-election, 2022 federal election in Eden-Monaro, the 2025 federal election in Eden-Monaro and the 2025 Kiama state by-election.

Thaler has been suspended from the council multiple times and has been accused of bullying by the CEO.

== Political career ==
In the 2019 state election, Thaler was an independent candidate for the seat of Monaro.

Thaler was an independent candidate for the 2022 Monaro state by-election and achieved 6% of the primary vote.

Thaler was an independent candidate for the 2022 federal election in the seat of Eden-Monaro. While campaigning in the election, Thaler pleaded guilty to intimidating a woman, but was not convicted, with the judge describing the events as "an absurd situation" and noting that "on all sides, this incident could have been handled better".

In 2024, following the death of Clare Nowland, an elderly person who was tasered by police, Thaler claimed to act as a spokesperson on behalf of Nowland's family but they denied this claim.

In 2024 Thaler was elected to Snowy Monaro Regional Council. He welcomed the resignation of council CEO David Hogan following the election.

In September 2024, Thaler was involved in an altercation with a campaigner for the yes vote in the 2023 Australian Indigenous Voice referendum; the case was dismissed by the court.

In April 2025, Thaler allegedly started a brawl between councillors after raising a motion calling for his neighbour's property to be investigated during a meeting of the council.

Thaler was a candidate for the 2025 Kiama state by-election. He cited his suspension from his duties as a councillor at the Snowy Monaro Regional Council as a reason he could campaign in this by-election.

Thaler was suspended three times from council for his behaviour and was banned from multiple businesses within the Cooma and Nimmitabel areas. Upon Thaler's third ban from council, in the normal course of events, he would have been disqualified from holding civic office for five years.

Thaler's behaviour led to an investigation by the Office of Local Government (a state government agency).

Following Thaler's third suspension, he applied for a stay on 31 October 2025 which was subsequently granted by the NSW Civil and Administrative Tribunal (NCAT) on 3 November. This meant that he was not removed from council as planned. The state government appealed NCAT's decision in the New South Wales Court of Appeal.

Thaler was suspended from council again in February 2026. His prior suspension was not recorded as that was stayed by NCAT.

Thaler targeted the council's chief executive officer, Noreen Vu, with insults. Vu initiated proceedings against Thaler at the Industrial Relations Commission of New South Wales to obtain a stop bullying order; a stop bullying order can order up to $100,000 in damages or allow the court to intervene in situations where an employee is facing cases of bullying. Vu's case is supported by the Development and Environmental Professionals' Association. Thaler also made allegations against local government minister Ron Hoenig, mayor of the council Chris Hanna, the United Services Union and the Office of Local Government.

On 6 November 2026, Thaler was ordered to stay away from deputy mayor Tanya Higgins as the result of an interim apprehended violence order (AVO), Thaler indicated that he would appeal against the measure; this means that Thaler can only interact with Higgins at the council or through a lawyer. The interim order will remain as is until hearings resume on 9 April 2027.

== Personal life ==
Thaler is a broadcaster and owns a scrapyard.
