= Lucas-Tooth baronets of Queen's Gate and Kameruka (1906) =

The Lucas-Tooth baronetcy, of Queen's Gate in the Royal Borough of Kensington, and of Kameruka in the county of Auckland, New South Wales, was created in the Baronetage of the United Kingdom on 26 July 1906 for the brewer Robert Lucas-Tooth. Born Robert Tooth, he had assumed by Royal licence the additional surname of Lucas (which was that of his maternal grandfather) in 1904.

He was succeeded by his youngest son, the 2nd Baronet. Like his two elder brothers, he died in the First World War in 1918; he left two daughters. None of the brothers left male issue, and the baronetcy became extinct.

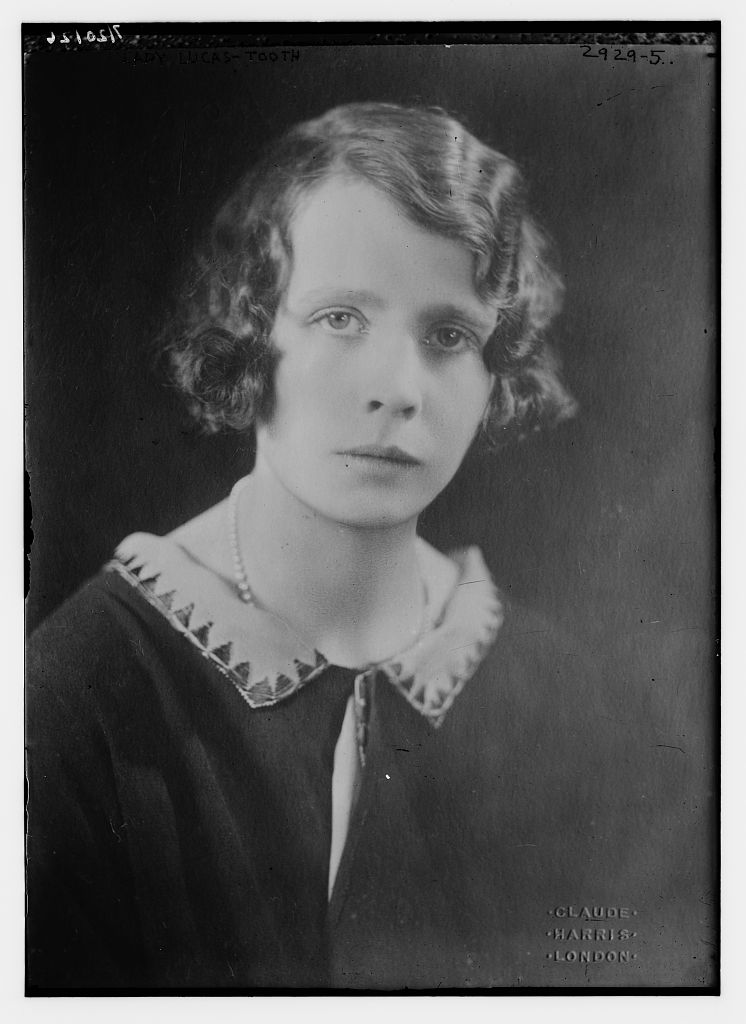
Lady Lucas-Tooth, wife of Sir Archibald Leonard Lucas Lucas-Tooth, 2nd Baronet (1884–1918)

== Lucas-Tooth baronets, of Queen's Gate and Kameruka (1906) ==
- Sir Robert Lucas Lucas-Tooth, 1st Baronet (1844–1915)
- Sir Archibald Leonard Lucas Lucas-Tooth, 2nd Baronet (1884–1918)

Coat of arms of Lucas-Tooth of Queen's Gate and Kameruka
Crest 1st, a gryphon segreant Gules, semée of mullets, and holding in the sinister claw a feather Argent (Tooth); 2nd, a demi-dragon Azure, holding in the paws a vine branch fructed and leaved Proper (Lucas). Escutcheon Quarterly, 1st and 4th: Gules, a demi-gryphon segreant between three feathers Argent (Tooth); 2nd and 3rd: Azure, on a bend between in chief two crescents and in based an estoile Argent, three vine leaves Proper (Lucas). Motto Perseverantia palmam obtinebit (Perseverance will obtain the palm)

== Notes ==
Baronetage of the United Kingdom
Preceded by Speyer baronets	Lucas-Tooth baronets of Queen's Gate and Kameruka; 26 July 1906	Succeeded by Wilson baronets
