= 1870 Monara colonial by-election =

By-election in New South Wales, Australia

A by-election was held in the New South Wales colonial electoral district of Monara, also called Monaro, on 17 November 1870. The by-election was triggered by the death of Daniel Egan.

== Dates ==
Date	Event
16 October 1870	Daniel Egan died.
20 October 1870	Writ of election issued by the Speaker of the Legislative Assembly.
7 November 1870	Nominations at Cooma
17 November 1870	Polling day
30 November 1870	Return of writ

== Result ==
1870 Monara by-election Thursday 17 November
Candidate	Votes	%
James Hart (elected)	465	52.1
Thomas Dawson	427	47.9
Total formal votes	892	100.0
Informal votes	0	0.0
Turnout	892	49.5

== See also ==
- Electoral results for the district of Monaro
- List of New South Wales state by-elections
