= Tooth (disambiguation) =

A tooth is a small, calcified, whitish structure found in the jaws (or mouths) of many vertebrates.

Tooth or Teeth may also refer to:

== Music ==
- Teeth (Filipino band), a Filipino rock band
- Teeth (electronic band), UK electronic pop punk band
- "Teeth" (5 Seconds of Summer song), 2019
- "Teeth" (Lady Gaga song), 2009
- "Teeth", a song by The Amenta from their 2013 album Flesh Is Heir
- "Teeth", a song by Brockhampton from Saturation II
- "Teeth", a song by Cage the Elephant from Melophobia
- "Teeth", a song by Die Monster Die from Withdrawal Method
- "Teeth", a song by Earlimart from their 2008 album Hymn and Her
- "Teeth", a song by Enhypen from Memorabilia
- "Teeth", a song by Fireworks from their 2011 album Gospel
- "Teeth", a song by Haste the Day from their 2026 album Dissenter
- "Teeth", a song by Underoath from their 2025 album The Place After This One
- "Teeth", a song by Wage War from their 2021 album Manic
- "Teeth (Interlude)", a song by XXXTentacion

== Other media ==
- Teeth (1924 film)
- Teeth (2007 film), a comedy horror film
- Teeth (musical), an adaptation of the 2007 film
- Tooth, a 2004 fantasy film starring Tim Dutton
- Teeth, a 1998 novel by Hugh Gallagher
- "Tooth" (The Good Guys), a 1992 television episode
- "Teeth", an episode of the Sesame Street spin-off show Elmo's World
- "Teeth", an episode of the Nick Jr. show Yo Gabba Gabba!

== Other uses ==
- Egg tooth, used by hatchlings to break through an eggshell
- Human tooth for teeth in humans
- Teeth, alternate name for tines: spikes on a tool or other object such as a comb or fork
- Tooth (surname), for people with the name

== See also ==
- Dental anatomy, field of anatomy involving the study of human tooth structures
- Teething, the process by which an infant's teeth sequentially appear by breaking through the gums
- The Tooth (disambiguation), rock formations
