= Kosciuszko Wild Horse Heritage Act 2018 =

Act of parliament in New South Wales

Parliament of New South Wales
- Long title: An Act to recognise the heritage value of sustainable wild horse populations within parts of Kosciuszko National Park and to protect that heritage.
- Citation: Kosciuszko Wild Horse Heritage Act 2018 (NSW) Act 24 of 2018
- Territorial extent: New South Wales
- Passed by: Legislative Assembly
- Passed: 5 June 2018
- Passed by: Legislative Council
- Passed: 6 June 2018
- Assented to by: Governor David Hurley
- Assented to: 15 June 2018
- Commenced: 15 June 2018
- Repealed: 3 December 2025

Legislative history

Initiating chamber: Legislative Assembly
- Bill title: Kosciuszko Wild Horse Heritage Bill
- Introduced by: John Barilaro
- Introduced: 23 May 2018
- First reading: 23 May 2018
- Second reading: 5 June 2018
- Third reading: 5 June 2018

Revising chamber: Legislative Council
- Bill title: Kosciuszko Wild Horse Heritage Bill
- Member(s) in charge: Niall Blair
- First reading: 5 June 2018
- Second reading: 6 June 2018
- Third reading: 6 June 2018

Repealed by
- Kosciuszko Wild Horse Heritage Repeal Act 2025

Related legislation
- National Parks and Wildlife Act 1974
- Status: Repealed

The Kosciuszko Wild Horse Heritage Act 2018, also known as the Brumby Bill, was a state-based act of parliament in New South Wales (NSW).

The purpose of the Act was to recognise the heritage value of sustainable wild horse populations within parts of Kosciuszko National Park and to protect that heritage. This included the creation of a 'Wild horse heritage management plan' and a Wild Horse Community Advisory Panel to ensure that a permanent population of wild horses was maintained within Kosciuszko National Park.

The Act was the subject of considerable controversy, having been criticised by media, scientific groups, academics, advocacy groups, and politicians due to allegations that it prioritised an invasive animal over the wellbeing of native species in the Kosciuszko National Park.

In October 2021, whilst announcing his resignation from politics, John Barilaro stated that "the iconic Snowy Mountains Brumby was saved when I legislated the Kosciusko Wild Horses Heritage Bill 2018".

The act was repealed by the Kosciuszko Wild Horse Heritage Repeal Bill 2025 in December 2025.

== Reactions and critiques ==
Opponents of the Kosciuszko Wild Horse Heritage Act alleged that John Barilaro, who tabled the Bill, had a conflict of interest, as he had previously received political donations from former-Nationals MP for Monaro Peter Cochran. Mr Cochran, who runs a company that provides horseback tours to see Brumbies in Kosciuszko National Park, has previously claimed to have helped write the Bill, however has denied having a vested commercial interest in the Brumby Bill being enacted.

The International Union for Conservation of Nature criticised the Bill after it was passed by the Legislative Assembly, stating that prioritising the historical value of feral animals over native species "creates a disturbing precedent at both national and global levels". The IUCN also expressed concern with the proposed make-up of the Wild Horse Community Advisory Panel, noting that "the panel does not require the inclusion of any scientific or policy experts on nature conservation". These concerns have also been echoed by the Australian Academy of Science, which described the Wild Horse Heritage Act as "incompatible with the principles that underpin Australia's world-leading protected area system, and with our commitments as a signatory to the Convention on Biological Diversity".

The day after the Bill was passed into law, Professor David Watson, a member of the NSW Threatened Species Scientific Committee, resigned from the group, citing the Brumby Bill's "wilful disregard" for science. Academics from Deakin University have also criticised the Bill, describing it as a "backward step for environmental protection in Australia".

Advocacy groups have provided differing responses to the Kosciuszko Wild Horse Heritage Act. The Invasive Species Council stated that by passing the Brumby Bill, that "the NSW Government turned Australia into a global laughing stock". The Bill has also been criticised by the Ecological Society of Australia, which described it as "a dangerously reckless policy that will escalate environmental impacts, increase costs of feral horse management, and put horses at risk of extreme suffering". In contrast, the Australian Brumby Alliance has praised the Brumby Bill as striking a balance "to the benefit of both the Brumbies and the Environment", and described negative responses to the Bill as "hysteria".

In response to the passing of the Brumby Bill, the Invasive Species Council, National Parks Association of the ACT, National Parks Association of NSW, Colong Foundation for Wilderness, and the Nature Conservation Council of NSW founded Reclaim Kosci, a group which aims "to protect the exceptional natural heritage values of Kosciuszko National Park from the damaging impacts of feral horses".

Prior to the 2019 New South Wales state election, Labor, the Greens and the Shooters, Fishers and Farmers Party had pledged to repeal the Kosciuszko Wild Horse Heritage Act. In 2019, Labor MP Penny Sharpe introduced a bill to the NSW Legislative Council to repeal the Act, which was never brought to a vote due to a lack of support.

=== Petitions calling for repeal ===
In 2019, Reclaim Kosci delivered to NSW parliament a petition with over 12,000 signatures, which called for the repeal of the Brumby Bill. The petition was voted down by Coalition MPs in the Legislative Assembly despite the tradition of allowing petitions from all constituents to be tabled and noted.

In 2021, Reclaim Kosci brought another petition to NSW parliament, calling for the repeal of the Kosciuszko Wild Horses Heritage Act, which gained 15,228 signatures. The petition was tabled by independent MP Joe McGirr, and noted by then-Minister for Energy and Environment Matt Kean on 18 March 2021.

=== Constitutional validity ===
On 13 October 2023, the Environment and Communications Reference Committee of the Australian Senate released a report questioning the constitutional validity of the Brumby Bill. Section 109 of the Australian Constitution dictates that in the circumstance of a state and federal law contradicting one another, the federal law (in this case the Environment Protection and Biodiversity Conservation Act 1999) takes precedent, rendering the Brumby Bill inoperable in the event of a challenge in the High Court. The report stated that the Brumby Bill "proposes significant limitations to protecting...highly vulnerable threatened species" by preventing the culling of the wild horses.

== Repeal ==
On 25 June 2025, independent MP Joe McGirr introduced the Kosciuszko Wild Horse Heritage Repeal Bill 2025 to NSW parliament, seeking to repeal the Kosciuszko Wild Horse Heritage Act. This bill was passed by the Legislative Assembly on 16 October 2025, and by the Legislative Council on 27 November 2025, and received royal assent on 3 December 2025.

== See also ==
- Invasive species in Australia
