= 2022 Monaro state by-election =

- 12 February 2022

Electoral district of Monaro in the New South Wales Legislative Assembly
- Registered: 57,982
- Turnout: 83.40% (▼8.43)
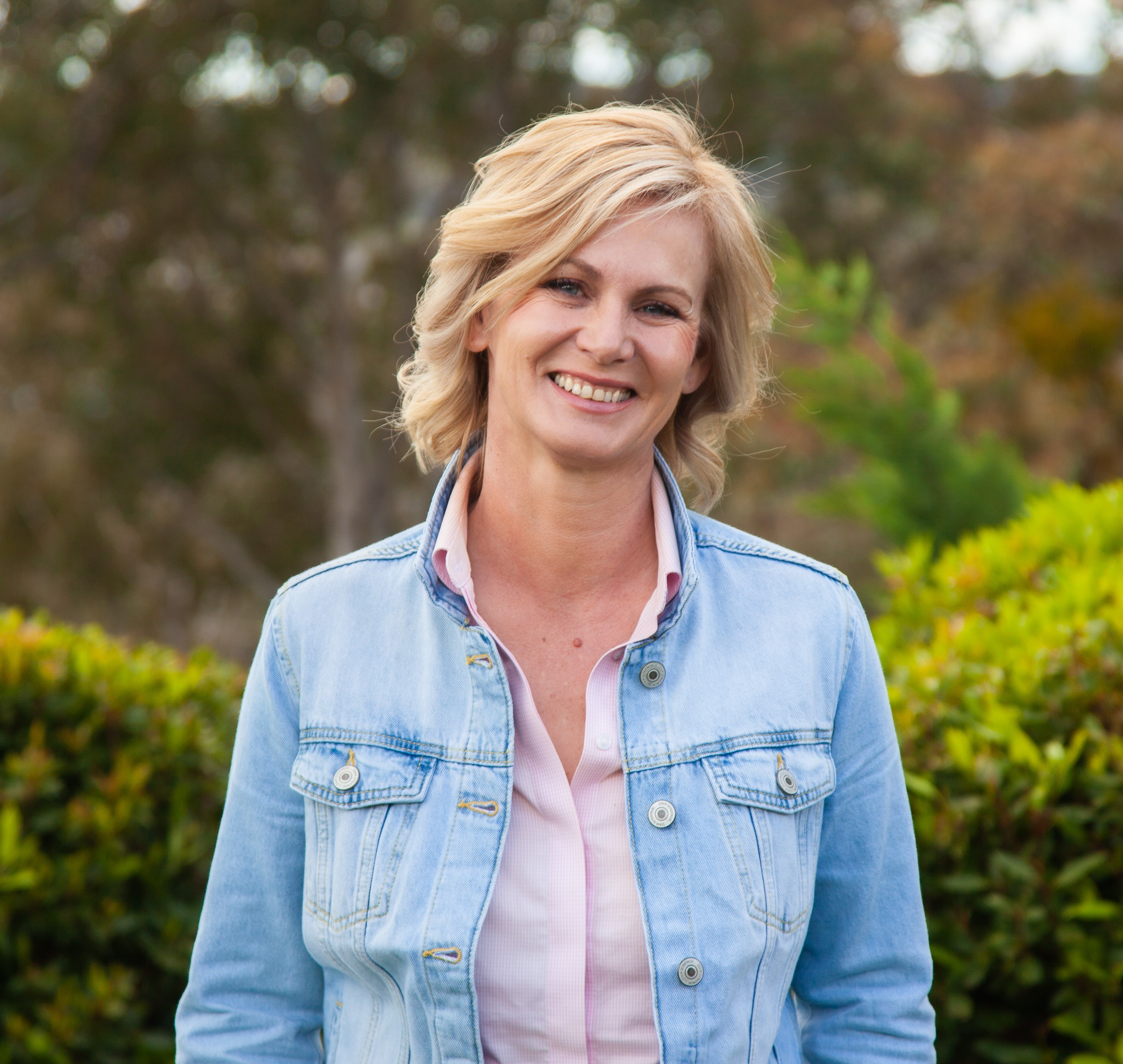

	First party	Second party
Candidate	Nichole Overall	Bryce Wilson
Party	National	Labor
Primary vote	21,728	15,102
Percentage	45.96%	31.95%
Swing	▼6.35	▲4.78
TCP	55.21%	44.80%
TCP swing	▼6.41	▲6.41
MP before election
John Barilaro
National
Elected MP
Nichole Overall
National

A by-election was held in the New South Wales Legislative Assembly seat of Monaro on 12 February 2022, following the resignation of Deputy Premier of New South Wales and Nationals MP John Barilaro.

== Background ==
The retiring member is former Deputy Premier of New South Wales John Barilaro. He previously served as the Minister for Regional Development (later renamed Minister for Regional New South Wales), Minister for Small Business, and Minister for Skills in the first Berejiklian and second Baird governments, from October 2014 until March 2019; and as the Minister for Regional Tourism in the first Baird government. In October 2021, he announced his resignation as Deputy Premier, Leader of the National Party and member for Monaro, saying it was "the right time for me to hand the reins over".

The Monaro by-election was held on the same day as by-elections for the districts of Bega, Strathfield and Willoughby. The writs for election were issued on 21 January 2022. Nominations for candidates closed seven days later at noon on 27 January, with the ballot paper draw commencing in the morning of 28 January.

The NSW Electoral Commission pre-emptively sent postal ballots to all voters registered on the state electoral roll for the relevant districts, under a regulation in a COVID amendment to the Electoral Act. Postal votes will be checked against in-person voting rolls to prevent double voting. The iVote online voting system was not used at these elections after the system failed during the NSW local government elections in December 2021.

== Candidates ==
Candidates are listed in the order they appeared on the ballot.

Party	Candidate	Background	Notes
Independent	Andrew Thaler	Trucker	
Nationals	Nichole Overall	Journalist and author	
Sustainable Australia	James Holgate		
Animal Justice Party	Frankie Seymour	Animal rights activist	
Greens	Catherine Moore	Former Palerang Councillor	
Labor	Bryce Wilson	Queanbeyan-Palerang Councillor	

== Results ==
2022 Monaro state by-election
Party	Candidate	Votes	%	±%
National	Nichole Overall	21,728	45.96	−6.35
Labor	Bryce Wilson	15,102	31.95	+4.78
Greens	Catherine Moore	4,178	8.84	+0.92
Independent	Andrew Thaler	2,986	6.32	+3.83
Sustainable Australia	James Holgate	1,920	4.06	+4.06
Animal Justice	Frankie Seymour	1,361	2.88	+0.54
Total formal votes		47,275	97.76	+0.46
Informal votes		1,081	2.24	−0.46
Turnout		48,356	83.40	−8.43
Two-party-preferred result
National	Nichole Overall	23,474	55.21	−6.41
Labor	Bryce Wilson	19,055	44.80	+6.41
National hold		Swing	−6.41	

== See also ==
- Electoral results for the district of Monaro
- List of New South Wales state by-elections
