= 1865 Monara colonial by-election =

By-election in New South Wales, Australia

A by-election was held in the New South Wales state electoral district of Monara, also called Monaro, on 30 March 1865. No poll was required as William Grahame was the only candidate nominated. The by-election was triggered by the resignation of James Martin. At the 1864–65 New South Wales colonial election, Martin had been defeated at elections for East Sydney (22 November), Tumut (10 December) and Wellington (21 December), before being elected to both Monara (24 December) and The Lachlan (28 December). Martin chose to resign from Monara.

== Dates ==
Date	Event
24 December 1864	Election for Monara
28 December 1864	Election for The Lachlan
7 March 1865	James Martin resigned.
15 March 1867	Writ of election issued by the Speaker of the Legislative Assembly.
30 March 1867	Nominations at Cooma
10 April 1867	Polling day
26 April 1867	Return of writ

== Result ==
1865 Monara by-election Thursday 30 March
Candidate	Votes	%
William Grahame (elected)	unopposed	

== See also ==
- Electoral results for the district of Monaro
- List of New South Wales state by-elections
