= Wilson baronets of Airdrie (1906) =

Escutcheon of the Wilson baronets of Airdrie

The Wilson baronetcy, of Airdrie in New Monkland in the County of Lanark, was created in the Baronetage of the United Kingdom on 27 July 1906 for John Wilson. He was Chairman of the Wilsons and Clyde Coal Company and also represented Falkirk Burghs in the House of Commons.

== Wilson baronets, of Airdrie (1906) ==
- Sir John Wilson, 1st Baronet (1844–1918)
- Sir James Robertson Wilson, 2nd Baronet (1883–1964)
- Sir John Menzies Wilson, 3rd Baronet (1885–1968)
- Sir Thomas Douglas Wilson, 4th Baronet (1917–1984)
- Sir James William Douglas Wilson, 5th Baronet (born 1960)

The heir apparent is the present holder's son Thomas Edward Douglas Wilson (born 1990).

== Notes ==
Baronetage of the United Kingdom
Preceded by Lucas-Tooth baronets	Wilson baronets of Airdrie; 27 July 1906	Succeeded by Morgan baronets
