= Sir Walter Morgan, 1st Baronet =

British businessman and Lord Mayor of London

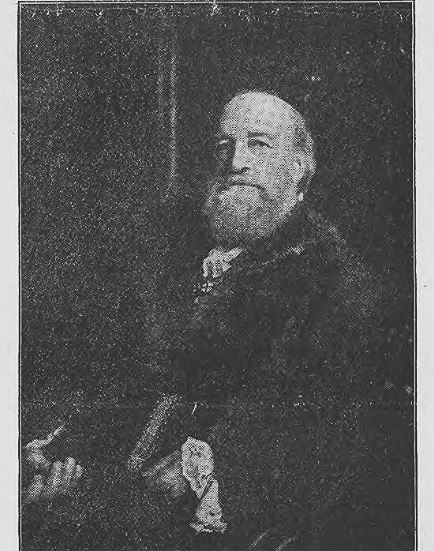
Sir Walter Morgan, 1st Baronet

Sir Walter Vaughan Morgan, 1st Baronet (3 May 1831 – 12 November 1916), was a British businessman and the 578th Lord Mayor of London.

Vaughan-Morgan was the sixth son of Thomas Morgan of Pipton, near Glasbury, Breconshire and his wife Elizabeth Vaughan. He served as Sheriff of London for 1900-01 and as Lord Mayor of London for 1905–05. In 1906 he was created a Baronet, of Whitehall Court in the City of Westminster. He was a treasurer of Christ's Hospital.

Together with his six brothers, he had established in 1856 the Patent Plumbago Crucible Company, acquiring a factory site in Battersea; this company has become Morgan Advanced Materials.

His youngest brother Octavius Vaughan Morgan, FSA (1837–96) was a Liberal MP for Battersea from 1885 until 1892.

Civic offices
Preceded by John Pound	Lord Mayor of London; 1905–1906	Succeeded by William Treloar
Baronetage of the United Kingdom
New creation	Baronet (of Whitehall Court); 1906–1916	Extinct
Preceded by Wilson baronets	Morgan baronets of Whitehall Court; 28 July 1906	Succeeded by Cawley baronets
