= The Tooth =

The Tooth may refer to:

- The Tooth (Antarctica), on Ross Island
- The Tooth (Washington), USA

== See also ==
- Tooth (disambiguation)
