= Lucas-Tooth baronets of Bught (1920) =

The Lucas-Tooth baronetcy, of Bught in the County of Inverness, was created in the Baronetage of the United Kingdom on 1 December 1920 for the seventeen-year-old Hugh Lucas-Tooth né Hugh Warrand. He was the son of Major Hugh Warrand and his wife Beatrice Maude, eldest daughter of the 1st Baronet of the 1906 creation. He assumed by Royal licence the surname of Lucas-Tooth in lieu of his patronymic in 1920. He later became a Conservative Member of Parliament. In 1965 he assumed for himself only the additional surname of Munro.

The baronetcy was created with remainder, failing male issue of the body of the grantee, to the other heirs male of the body of his mother.

== Lucas-Tooth baronets, of Bught (1920) ==
- Sir Hugh Vere Huntly Duff Munro-Lucas-Tooth, 1st Baronet (1903–1985)
- Sir (Hugh) John Lucas-Tooth, 2nd Baronet (born 1932) has three daughters; there is no heir to the baronetcy.

Coat of arms of Munro-Lucas-Tooth, Lucas-Tooth of Bught
Crest 1st, a gryphon segreant Gules, semée of mullets, and holding in the sinister claw a feather Argent (Tooth); 2nd, a demi-dragon Azure, holding in the paws a vine branch fructed and leaved Proper (Lucas). Escutcheon Quarterly, 1st and 4th: Gules, a demi-gryphon segreant between three feathers Argent (Tooth); 2nd and 3rd: Azure, on a bend between in chief two crescents and in based an estoile Argent, three vine leaves Proper (Lucas). Motto Perseverantia palmam obtinebit (Perseverance will obtain the palm)
