= Archibald Lucas-Tooth =

2nd Baronet Lucas-Tooth

Sir Archibald Leonard Lucas Lucas-Tooth, 2nd Baronet (3 June 1884 – 12 July 1918) was a baronet of the United Kingdom, who died of illness towards the end of World War I.

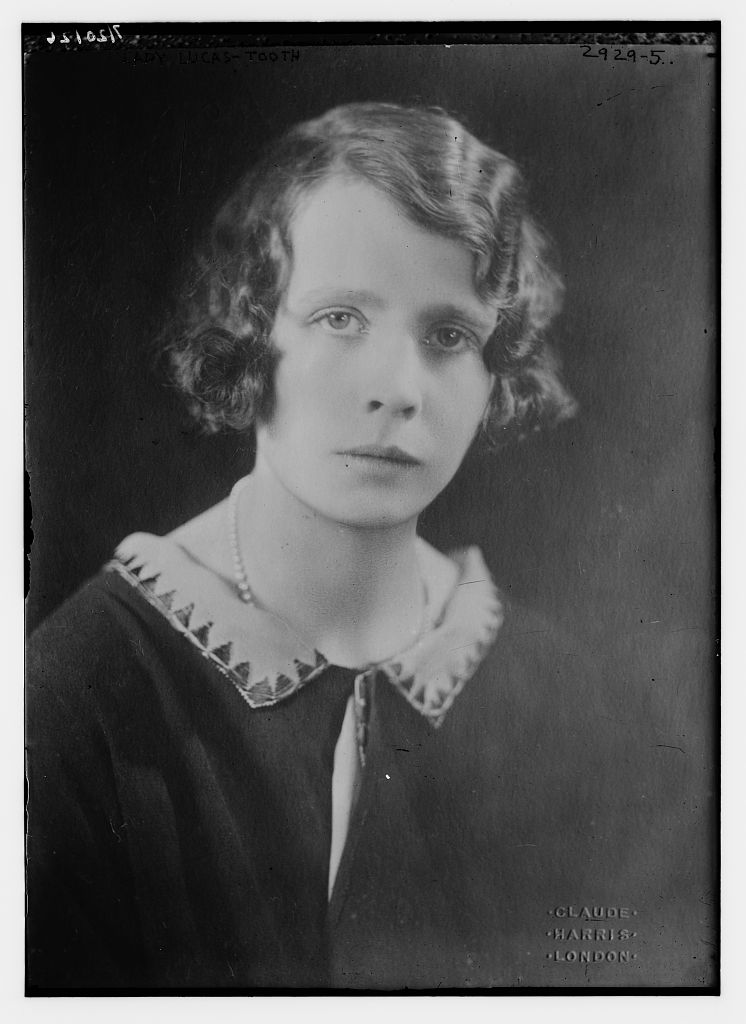
Rosa, Lady Lucas-Tooth

Archibald was born in Darling Point, Sydney, on 3 June 1884 to Sir Robert Lucas-Tooth, 1st Baronet and Helen Tooth, the youngest of three sons, and had four sisters. Brothers Captain Selwyn Lucas Lucas-Tooth (born 19 March 1879, Sydney), 3rd Battalion of the Lancashire Fusiliers, was killed in action at Ypres on 20 October 1914; and Captain Douglas Keith Lucas-Tooth (born October 1882, Sydney), 9th Queen's Royal Lancers, died in action in the Battle of Aisne on 14 September 1914.

Lucas-Tooth married Rosa Mary Bovill on 4 January 1916, at the Holy Trinity church, Brompton Road, London. She was the daughter of Charles Arthur Bovill and Penelope Magdalen Sclater-Booth. They had two children: Rosemarie Helen Lucas-Tooth (1916-?); and Christine Leonard Lucas-Tooth (1918-?).

On the death of his father on 19 February 1915, he succeeded to the title of 2nd Baronet Lucas-Tooth, of Queen's Gate, Kensington and Kameruka, New South Wales and to the family estate at Holme Lacy. The baronetcy had only been created in 1907.

While during duty in London, when war was declared in 1914, Lucas-Tooth joined the army. Having previously held a commission in the service of the Honourable Artillery Company, he rejoined the company which was almost immediately called to active service. After a long period of training, and coastal defence duty on an east coast of Scotland, the regiment returned to Salisbury Plains. On 20 June 1916 he went to France with the battalion. He rose to the rank of major, and died on active service of pneumonia on 12 July 1918 at the age of 34.

As neither he nor his brothers left any male heirs the title therefore expired with him.

Lady Rosa remarried in 1923 and Holme Lacy was sold.

Baronetage of the United Kingdom
Preceded by Robert Lucas-Tooth	Baronet (of Queen's Gate and Kameruka); 1915–1918	Extinct
