= John Seiffert =

Australian politician (1905–1965)

Personal details
- Born: 9 September 1905 Goulburn, New South Wales
- Died: 10 January 1965 (aged 59) Queanbeyan, New South Wales
- Party: Labor Party; Independent

John Wesley Seiffert (9 September 1905 – 10 January 1965) was an Australian politician and a member of the New South Wales Legislative Assembly from 1941 until his death in 1965. He was a member of the Labor Party (ALP), but stood at an Independent Labor candidate at the 1950 state election.

== Early life ==
Seiffert was born in Goulburn, New South Wales, and was the son of a gardener. He was educated to elementary level and worked as a prison warder. As a youth, he was a keen sportsman, and was an Australian amateur cycle champion as well as a founder of the New South Wales Country Rugby League. He joined the ALP in 1931, and was an alderman in the Goulburn Municipal Council from 1934 to 1937.

== State parliament ==
Seiffert was elected to the parliament as the Labor member for Monaro at the 1941 state election, defeating the incumbent Country Party member William Hedges by less than 200 votes. Monaro was one of a number of rural seats won by Labor at the 1941 election, and those victories contributed to the formation of the Labor government of William McKell. Seiffert retained the seat for the Labor Party at the next two elections.

== Dis-endorsement and readmission to Labor Party ==
In November 1949, Eli Harrison resigned from the Legislative Council to contest the federal seat of Blaxland at the 1949 federal election. His successor was due to be elected at a joint sitting of the two houses of parliament on 22 March 1950. Very shortly before the vote, Sir Asher Joel, a wealthy Sydney businessman, was a surprise nomination against Labor's candidate, Norman Thom. Joel lost, but managed to get 23 votes. Although the election was by secret ballot, each Labor member of parliament had a unique how-to-vote card, so Labor scrutineers were able to determine if a member had broken caucus solidarity and voted against the Labor nominee.

Soon, it became common knowledge within the Labor Party, although never officially stated, that four members of the ALP had voted for Joel. The four were Seiffert, James Geraghty of (North Sydney), Roy Heferen of (Barwon), and Fred Stanley of (Lakemba). There were rumours that all four parliamentarians had received cash payments for their votes, although that was never proven.

The state executive of the Labor Party responded by withholding its endorsement of those candidates at the imminent 1950 state election. Despite that, Seiffert and the other dis-endorsed members received support from various members of the Labor caucus, and a severe rift developed between the parliamentary and extra-parliamentary parties, which was a major contribution to Labor's poor showing at the election.

Seiffert also enjoyed substantial popularity among the members of his own branch and no alternative ALP candidate from the branch could be found in time. Deciding to defend his seat as an independent, he remained within the ALP on a technicality: unlike the other three, he had not stood against a party-endorsed candidate, so he was not expelled from the ALP. His readmission to the caucus after the election gave the government of incumbent Premier James McGirr a one-seat majority in the Assembly. Seiffert continued to represent Monaro until his death, which took place a few months prior to the 1965 election.

Seiffert Oval in Queanbeyan is named after him.

New South Wales Legislative Assembly
Preceded by William Hedges	Member for Monaro; 1941–1965	Succeeded by Steve Mauger
