= Henry Badgery =

Politician and stock and station agent in New South Wales, Australia

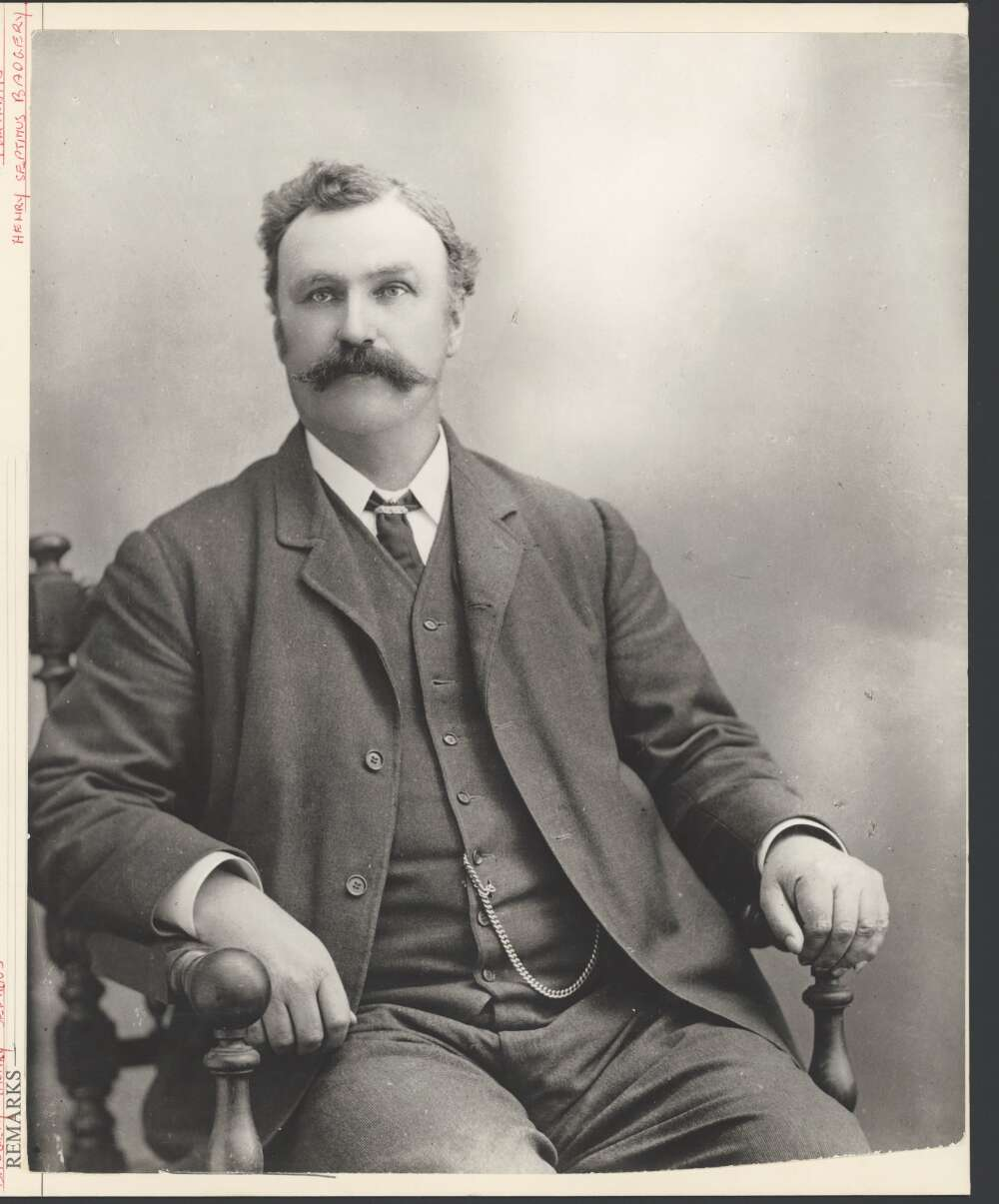
- Badgery c.1891

Member of the New South Wales Legislative Assembly for Monaro
- In office 2 December 1880 – 7 October 1885 Serving with Robert Lucas-Tooth (until 24 July 1884), David Ryrie (from 24 July 1884)
- Monarch: Victoria
- Premier: Sir Henry Parkes; Alexander Stuart
- Preceded by: John Murphy
- Succeeded by: Henry Dawson

Member of the New South Wales Legislative Assembly for East Maitland
- In office 5 June 1878 – 9 November 1880
- Monarch: Victoria
- Premier: James Farnell; Sir Henry Parkes
- Preceded by: Stephen Scholey
- Succeeded by: James Brunker

Personal details
- Born: Henry Septimus Badgery; 9 December 1840 Sutton Forest, New South Wales
- Died: 23 August 1917 (aged 76) Exeter, New South Wales
- Party: Independent

Henry Septimus Badgery (9 December 1840 – 23 August 1917) was an Australian politician, elected as a member of the New South Wales Legislative Assembly.

Badgery was born at Sutton Forest, New South Wales, and married, in 1869, Julia, daughter of G. M. Pitt, of Sydney. He was member for East Maitland in the Legislative Assembly of New South Wales from 5 June 1878 to 9 November 1880, and was afterwards twice elected for Monaro, serving from 2 December 1880 to 7 October 1885. Having joined the Dibbs Ministry as Secretary for Public Works, on 7 October 1885, he was defeated at Camden 12 days later and resigned office on the 31st of the same month.

Following the death of his first wife in 1894 at age 52, Badgery married a second time to Alice May King in 1896 who died late that year aged 38. He then married a third time in 1900 to Sybella Louisa, née Hooke. Badgery had six children, four sons and two daughters, in his first marriage and three children, two sons and a daughter, by his third marriage.

His brother, Frank Badgery, served in the Legislative Assembly from 1913 to 1915.

Parliament of New South Wales
Political offices
Preceded by Francis Wright	Secretary for Public Works; 1885	Succeeded by William Lyne
New South Wales Legislative Assembly
Preceded by Stephen Scholey	Member for East Maitland; 1878–1880	Succeeded by James Brunker
Preceded by John Murphy	Member for Monaro; 1880–1885; With: Robert Tooth / David Ryrie	Succeeded by Henry Dawson; Harold Stephen
