= Thomas O'Mara =

Australian politician (1847–1891)

Thomas Chrysostom O'Mara (1847 – 23 June 1891) was an Australian politician.

He was born in Tumut to pastoralist Timothy O'Mara and Johanna Quilty. He was a barrister, admitted to the bar in 1874. In 1882 he was elected to the New South Wales Legislative Assembly as the member for Tumut. Defeated in 1885, he returned in 1887 as the member for Monaro, but was defeated once more in 1889. He died at Burwood in 1891.

New South Wales Legislative Assembly
Preceded by James Hoskins	Member for Tumut; 1882–1885	Succeeded by Travers Jones
Preceded by Harold Stephen	Member for Monaro; 1887–1889; Served alongside: Henry Dawson	Succeeded by Harold Stephen
