= Peter Webb (politician) =

Australian politician

Peter William Webb (born 7 March 1953) is an Australian politician. He was a National Party member of the New South Wales Legislative Assembly from 1999 to 2003, representing the electorate of Monaro.

Webb studied at Canberra Grammar School and Yanco Agricultural College, and was a grazier before entering politics. He served a number of terms on the Shire of Yarrowlumla council, including several years as its mayor. He was subsequently preselected as the National Party candidate for the open local seat of Monaro, which had been vacated by retiring maverick National MLA Peter Cochran. Campaigning on the state of the timber industry and the decline of rural infrastructure, he faced a very tight race against the Labor candidate, and emerged successful despite trailing for most of the count, in a result that was not known for days.

Webb, like his predecessor, established a reputation as a maverick MP. He once took a tray of local lamb to the American embassy to protest American agriculture tariffs, called for the abolition of the National Parks and Wildlife Service with the delegation of its responsibilities to local councils, and suggested letting the state's prison population tame wild brumbies in the Snowy Mountains. He also had two vocal in-person clashes with Premier Bob Carr, and was once criticised for signing a petition by the Lyndon LaRouche-affiliated Citizens Electoral Council.

He faced a difficult race for re-election at the 2003 state election, with Steve Whan, the son of the former local federal MP Bob Whan, preselected as the Labor candidate. After another close race, Whan was declared the winner, in a result that Webb attributed to Labor's advertising budget, the war in Iraq, and the decision of the Greens to direct their preferences to Labor.

New South Wales Legislative Assembly
Preceded by Peter Cochran	Member for Monaro; 1999–2003	Succeeded by Steve Whan
