= William Grahame (1808–1890) =

Australian politician

Personal details
- Born: 1 January 1808 Stirlingshire, Scotland
- Died: 26 November 1890 (aged 82) Waverley, New South Wales
- Party: Protectionist Party

William Grahame (1808 – 26 November 1890) was an Australian politician. He was a member of the New South Wales Legislative Assembly from 1865 until 1869 and from 1872 until 1874. He was also a life member of the New South Wales Legislative Council from 1875 until 1889.

Grahame was born in Stirlingshire, Scotland and migrated to Australia in 1828. He initially worked as a sheep hauler but rapidly acquired a large amount of land in the Monaro area. He failed in an attempt to win the seat of Monaro at the 1864–65 election but was elected to parliament unopposed at a subsequent by-election when it was found that the winner of the seat, the Premier, James Martin, had been elected to two seats. Grahame was defeated at the 1869–70 election but regained his seat at the subsequent election in 1872. He retired from the Legislative Assembly at the 1874–75 election and became a nominated life-time appointee in the Legislative Council. His seat on the council was declared vacant on 27 February 1889 because he had been absent from the council for 2 continuous sessions. He did not hold ministerial or party office.

New South Wales Legislative Assembly
Preceded by James Martin	Member for Monaro; 1865 – 1869	Succeeded by Daniel Egan
Preceded by James Hart	Member for Monaro; 1872 – 1875	Succeeded by Alexander Montague
