= Lucas-Tooth baronets =

Set index for Lucas-Tooth baronets

There have been two baronetcies created for persons with the surname Lucas-Tooth, both in the Baronetage of the United Kingdom. As of 2026, one is extant.

- Lucas-Tooth baronets of Queen's Gate and Kameruka (1906)
- Lucas-Tooth baronets of Bught (1920)
