= Alexander Hamilton (Australian politician) =

Scottish-born Australian politician

Alexander Hamilton (1816 – 31 January 1869) was a Scottish-born Australian politician.

He was born at Greenock, the son of Hugh Hamilton. He migrated to New South Wales around 1839 and became a squatter in the Monaro district. In 1859 he was elected to the New South Wales Legislative Assembly for Monaro, but he retired in 1860. Hamilton died at Woolway Station near Cooma in 1869.

New South Wales Legislative Assembly
Preceded by Daniel Egan	Member for Monaro; 1859–1860	Succeeded by Thomas Garrett
