= Peter Cochran (politician) =

Australian politician

Peter Lachlan Cochran

Member of the New South Wales Legislative Assembly for Monaro
- In office 19 March 1988 – 26 October 1998
- Preceded by: John Akister
- Succeeded by: John Fraser

Personal details
- Born: Albury, New South Wales, Australia
- Party: National
- Occupation: politician; farmer; army officer; lobbyist

Military service
- Battles/wars: Vietnam War

Peter Lachlan Cochran is a former Australian politician. He was the National Party member for Monaro in the New South Wales Legislative Assembly from 1988 to 1998. In recent years he has been known for his ongoing lobbying to keep feral horses (known as brumbies) within the Kosciuszko National Park.

== Early life and education ==
Peter Lachlan Cochran was born in Albury in New South Wales.

== Career ==
Cochran enlisted in the Army in 1965 and was sent to Vietnam in 1969, returning in 1970. He left the main force in 1972, and was a reservist from 1977 to 1979.

Commissioned as a Justice of the Peace, he farmed near Adaminaby after leaving the armed forces and became involved in the National Party.

In 1987 he stood unsuccessfully as the National candidate for the federal seat of Eden-Monaro, but came third after Labor MP Jim Snow and Liberal candidate David Evans, obtaining 16.4% of the vote. Nevertheless, this was a large increase from the 1984 result of 3.9%.

In 1988, Cochran was selected as the Nationals' candidate for the state seat of Monaro, previously a marginal Labor seat. Cochran defeated sitting member John Akister and also warded off an attempt by the Liberal Party to win the seat. In parliament he acted as liaison between the parliamentary party and the Young Nationals. He was known for opposing the creation of new national parks and backing the four-wheel drive lobby to access existing ones. He was re-elected in 1991 and 1995, the latter coming even as the Coalition lost government. During his final term, he was Monaro's first opposition member in 65 years. He resigned from parliament on 26 October 1998, shortly before the 1999 election.

In 2001, Cochran returned to politics as an independent candidate for the federal seat of Eden-Monaro, one of several independents to stand in that election. Cochran came third behind the Liberal and Labor candidates, with 8.2% of the vote.

== In retirement ==
In 2018 Cochran runs commercial horse treks through the Kosciuscko National Park. He has been lobbying for feral horses (known as brumbies) to remain in the park. He came under scrutiny in May 2018 after it was discovered he and his wife had donated more than $10,000 to the Nationals leader John Barilaro, who had put a bill through parliament listing feral horses in NSW as having heritage significance.

New South Wales Legislative Assembly
Preceded by John Akister	Member for Monaro; 1988–1998	Succeeded by Peter Webb
