= Steve Whan =

Australian politician

The Honourable Steve Whan MP

Minister for Skills, TAFE and Tertiary Education
- Incumbent
- Assumed office 28 September 2023
- Premier: Chris Minns
- Preceded by: Prue Car

Member of the New South Wales Legislative Assembly for Monaro
- Incumbent
- Assumed office 15 April 2023
- Preceded by: Nichole Overall
- In office 22 March 2003 – 26 March 2011
- Preceded by: Peter Webb
- Succeeded by: John Barilaro

Member of the New South Wales Legislative Council
- In office 20 June 2011 – 5 March 2015
- Preceded by: Tony Kelly
- Succeeded by: Daniel Mookhey

Government Whip in the New South Wales Legislative Assembly
- In office 3 May 2023 – 17 October 2023
- Deputy: Janelle Saffin
- Preceded by: Nathaniel Smith
- Succeeded by: Nathan Hagarty
Ministerial offices 2009–2011
Minister for Emergency Services
In office 30 January 2009 – 28 March 2011
Premier	Nathan Rees; Kristina Keneally
Preceded by	Tony Kelly
Succeeded by	Mike Gallacher
Minister for Rural Affairs
In office 14 September 2009 – 28 March 2011
Premier	Nathan Rees; Kristina Keneally
Preceded by	Tony Kelly
Succeeded by	Position abolished
Minister for Primary Industries
In office 8 December 2009 – 28 March 2011
Premier	Kristina Keneally
Preceded by	Ian Macdonald
Succeeded by	Katrina Hodgkinson
Minister for Small Business
In office 30 January 2009 – 4 December 2009
Premier	Nathan Rees
Preceded by	Jodi McKay
Succeeded by	Peter Primrose

Personal details
- Born: Steven James Robert Whan; 11 February 1964 (age 62) Canberra, Australia
- Party: Labor
- Spouse: Cherie
- Children: Lachlan and Maddison
- Education: Canberra CAE; University of Western Sydney
- Occupation: Politician

Steven James Robert Whan (born 11 February 1964) is an Australian politician who has served as Minister for Skills, TAFE and Tertiary Education since 2023. He has represented the electoral district of Monaro in the New South Wales Legislative Assembly for the Labor Party since 2023, after previously representing the seat from 2003 until 2011. He was a member of the Legislative Council from 2011 to 2015. Whan served as Minister of Emergency Services, Minister for Small Business and Minister for Rural Affairs in the Rees and Keneally ministries from 2009 to 2011. Whan lives in Queanbeyan with his wife and two children. Whan is a member of Labor Right.

== Early career and background ==
Born in Canberra, he is the son of Bob Whan, a former member for the federal seat of Eden-Monaro. Steve Whan was educated at the Canberra College of Advanced Education (now University of Canberra). He graduated in 1985 with a Bachelor of Arts in Social Sciences, majoring in Economics and Politics. In 1998, he received a Graduate Certificate in Management from the University of Western Sydney.

From 1987 to 1988 Whan was assistant private secretary to John Brown, Federal Minister for Arts, Sport, the Environment, Tourism and Territories. He later worked for senator Bob McMullan until 1992. Between 1992 and 1994, Whan worked for Ros Kelly, Federal Minister for Environment, Sport and Territories.

He worked for the Australian Sports Commission from 1994 to 2001, and subsequently became a consultant on community relations and sport, before being preselected as a Labor candidate for the New South Wales Legislative Assembly.

== Political career ==
Representing Labor, Whan contested Eden-Monaro, which was held by his father Bob between 1972 and 1975, at the 1998 and 2001 federal elections, and was unsuccessful on both occasions.

Whan was elected as the member for New South Wales state seat of Monaro at the 2003 state election. As the local member he secured funding for the rebuilding of Queanbeyan and Bombala Hospitals. He also guaranteed record levels of funding to the Kings Highway, increased local Rural Fire Service staffing numbers and new fire trucks, as well as funding to several local community organisations.

In January 2009, Whan was appointed as the Minister for Emergency Services, Small Business and Rural Affairs in the Rees ministry. In December 2009 when Kristina Keneally became Premier he was made Minister for Primary Industry and Minister for Emergency Services and Rural Affairs. During 2010 he also added Mineral Resources and Forestry to the Primary Industries portfolio responsibilities. As Minister for Primary Industries he sought assistance for farmers and producers in NSW who were suffering one of the State's longest running droughts. Whan guaranteed stock and fodder subsidies for farmers and drought declaration assistance. Whan also oversaw the introduction of kilojoule labelling for fast-food chain restaurants so that customers were aware of the kilojoule content of the foods they were purchasing.

At the 2011 state election, Whan was defeated in Monaro by a margin of 2 per cent, which was one of the lowest anti-Labor swings in the state. Less than three months later, Whan was appointed to the Legislative Council to fill a casual vacancy, succeeding Tony Kelly. Whan was immediately promoted to the shadow cabinet, becoming the shadow minister for Resources and Primary Industries, shadow Special Minister of State, and shadow minister for Tourism, Major Events, Hospitality and Racing. In 2014 he was preselected as the Labor candidate for the seat of Monaro at the 2015 state election. Before his preselection, Whan stated his intention to retire from politics if he did not win Monaro at the 2015 election.

At the 2015 election, Whan was defeated for the second time by sitting member John Barilaro, by a margin of 2.53 points. Barilaro improved the Nationals margin by 0.53 points, even though the remainder of the state swung to the ALP.

In February 2023, it was announced that he would be replacing Terry Campese as the Labor candidate for Monaro at the March state election and was subsequently elected. He served for five months as Government Whip in the New South Wales Legislative Assembly before being appointed as Minister for Skills, TAFE and Tertiary Education in the Minns ministry.

New South Wales Legislative Assembly
Preceded by Peter Webb	Member for Monaro; 2003–2011	Succeeded by John Barilaro
Preceded by Nichole Overall	Member for Monaro; 2023–present	Incumbent
Political offices
Preceded by Tony Kelly	Minister for Emergency Services; 2009–2011	Succeeded by Mike Gallacher as Minister for Police and Emergency Services
Preceded by Tony Kelly	Minister for Rural Affairs; 2009–2011	Succeeded by Katrina Hodgkinson as Minister for Primary Industries
Preceded by Prue Car	Minister for Skills, TAFE and Tertiary Education; 2023–present	Incumbent
