= United Services Union =

Trade union in Australia

- NSW Local Government Clerical Administrative Energy Airlines & Utilities Union
- United Services Union
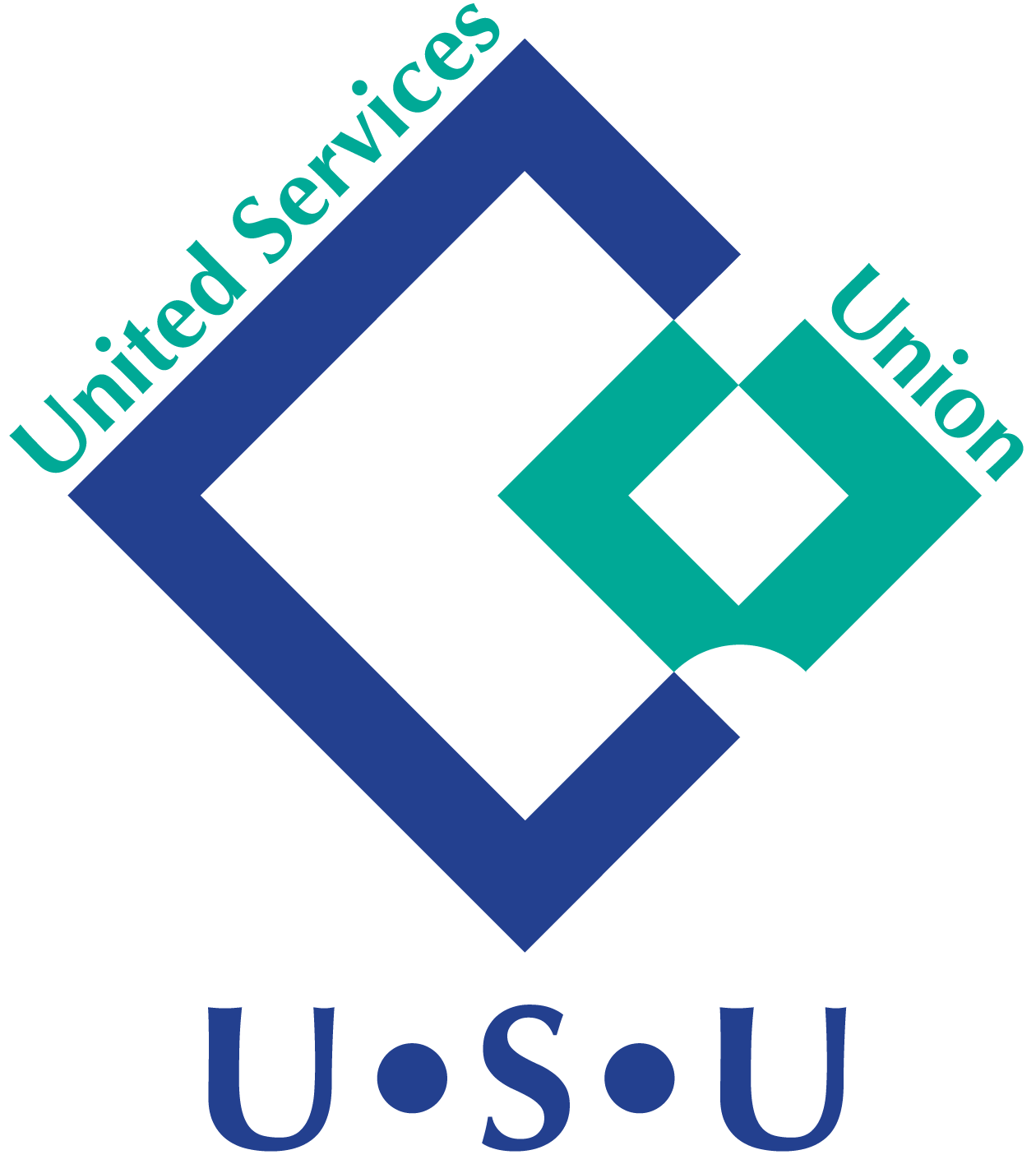
- Founded: 21 May 2003
- Headquarters: Level 7, 321 Pitt Street, Sydney, New South Wales, Australia 2000
- Location: Australia
- Members: 30,000
- Key people: Graeme Kelly (General Secretary)
- Affiliations: ACTU, ALP
- Website: usu.org.au

The United Services Union (registered as the NSW Local Government Clerical Administrative Energy Airlines & Utilities Union) is a trade union representing workers in a variety of industries.

The USU is affiliated with the Australian Council of Trade Unions and the Australian Labor Party.

The United Services Union (USU) has over 30,000 members and represents Local Government, Clerical, Administrative, Energy, Airlines and Utilities employees throughout NSW and the ACT.

The United Services Union is a democratic organisation. Larger workplaces elect local delegates and all USU members are represented by an elected branch committee and by executive members.

The United Services Union was formed on 21 May 2003 following the merge between two branches of the Australian Services Union, the Municipal Employees Union and the Clerical and Administrative Branch of the ASU.

The USU forms the largest branch of the Australian Services Union.
