= Henry Dawson (Australian politician) =

Australian politician

Henry Dawson (4 December 1849 – 1 January 1919) was an Australian politician.

He was born at Cooma to police magistrate Robert Dawson and Margaret Hartnett. He became a solicitor, practising at Cooma and from 1886 at Sydney. In 1874 he married Helena Druitt, with whom he had two daughters. In 1885 he was elected to the New South Wales Legislative Assembly as the member for Monaro. A Protectionist, he held the seat until his defeat in 1894. Dawson died at Dulwich Hill in 1919.

New South Wales Legislative Assembly
Preceded by Henry Badgery; David Ryrie	Member for Monaro; 1885–1894; Served alongside: Stephen/O'Mara/Stephen/Miller	Succeeded by Gus Miller
