= John Murphy (New South Wales politician, born 1821) =

English-born Australian politician

John Murphy (1821 – 24 June 1883) was an English-born Australian politician.

He migrated to New South Wales around 1843 and became a pastoralist. On 22 February 1855 he married Mary Albon, with whom he had six children. By 1866 he owned Kybean station in the Monaro district. In 1877 he was elected to the New South Wales Legislative Assembly for Monaro, but he did not re-contest in 1880. Murphy died at Bibbenluke in 1883.

New South Wales Legislative Assembly
Preceded by Alexander Montague	Member for Monaro; 1877–1880	Succeeded by Henry Badgery; Robert Tooth
