= William Hedges (New South Wales politician) =

Australian politician

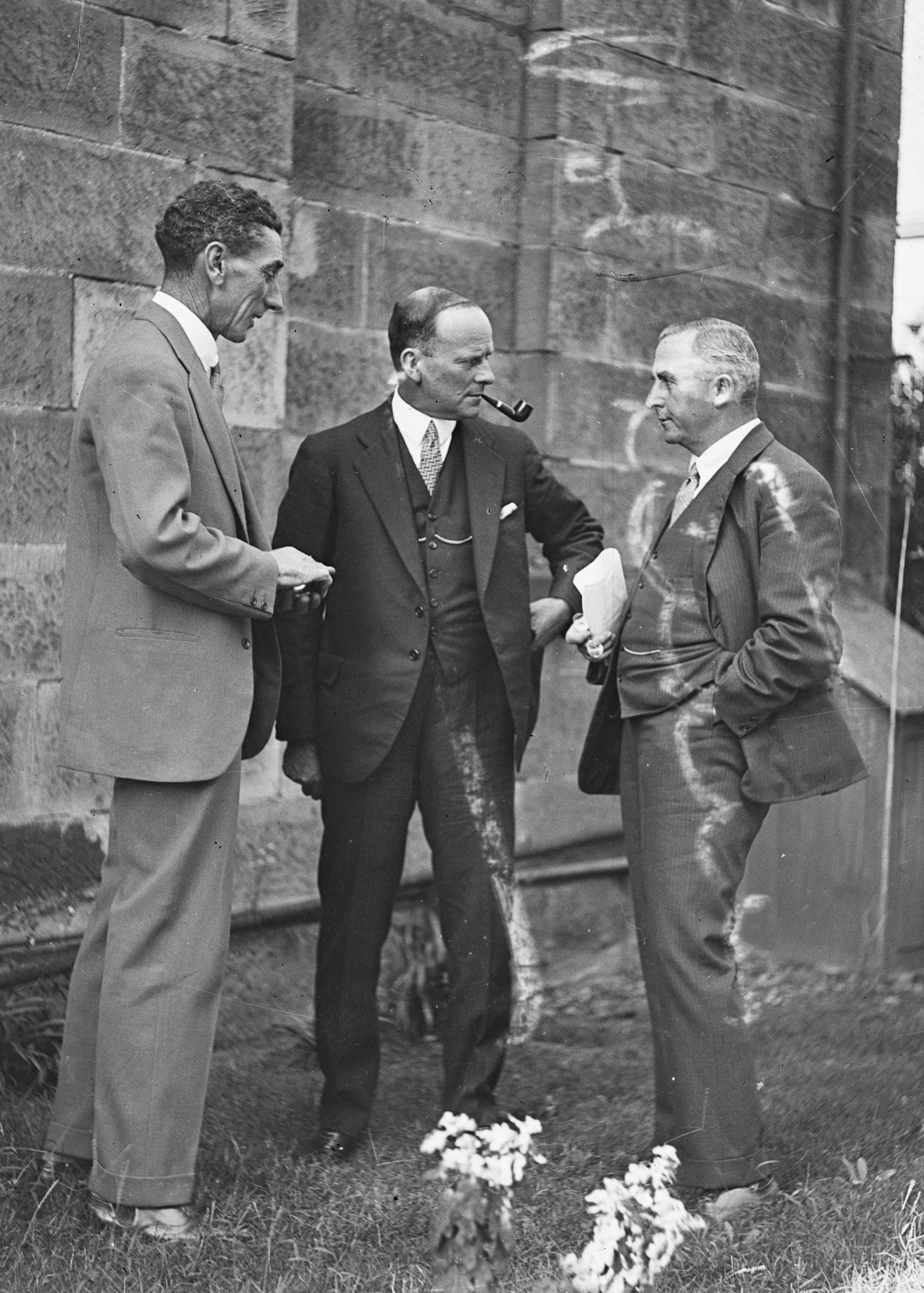
Hedges (left) with fellow Country Party members Michael Bruxner and Alfred Pollack in 1928

William Whaley Hedges (3 April 1881 – 9 May 1962) was an Australian politician. He was a Country Party member of the New South Wales Legislative Assembly from 1927 to 1941, representing the electorate of Monaro.

Hedges was born at Parramatta, and was educated at Horton College in Tasmania. He worked as a woolclasser after leaving school, and in 1909, became a grazier at Rock Flat, near Cooma. He was an active member of the Graziers' Association, serving as Cooma district president and serving two terms as a member of their general council. He was a life member of the Farmers' and Settlers Association, and served as president of the Cooma Pastoral and Agricultural Association and the Cooma Race Club.

Hedges first ran for public office at the 1922 federal election, when he was in an unwinnable position on the Country Party's Senate ticket. He first attempted to enter state politics in 1925, when he unsuccessfully contested multi-member Goulburn as a Progressive. In 1927, after the return to single-member electorates, he contested Monaro for the Country Party, and defeated sitting Labor MLA Paddy Stokes. He narrowly held off a challenge from Stokes in 1930, and was easily re-elected throughout the 1930s. In 1941, however, he faced a resurgent Labor Party and a strong local candidate in John Seiffert, and lost to Seiffert by 181 votes.

Hedges retired from politics after his defeat, and returned to his farm. He retired to Tuross Head in 1950. He died at Moruya in 1962, and was buried at Cooma.

New South Wales Legislative Assembly
Preceded by Seat re-established	Member for Monaro; 1927–1941	Succeeded by John Seiffert
