= Alexander Montague =

Australian politician (1815–1898)

Alexander Montague (1815 – 7 October 1898) was an Australian politician.

He was born at Cloughlin in County Tyrone to farmers James and Mary Montague. He migrated to Sydney in 1841 and established a general store at Cooma, where he bought up extensive land and built a flour mill. On 4 February 1850 he married Rosina O'Hare, with whom he had five children. In 1875, he was elected to the New South Wales Legislative Assembly for Monaro, but he was defeated in 1877. Montague died at Cooma in 1898.

New South Wales Legislative Assembly
Preceded by William Grahame	Member for Monaro; 1875–1877	Succeeded by John Murphy
