= Steve Mauger =

Australian politician

Stephen George Mauger (17 June 1920 – 12 March 1976) was an Australian politician. He was the Liberal member for Monaro in the New South Wales Legislative Assembly from 1965 to 1976, and was Minister for Youth, Ethnic and Community Affairs from 1975 to 1976.

Mauger was born in Williamstown in Victoria to Albert Stephen Bamford, an electrical engineer in the fire brigade, and Matilda May Walker. The family moved to Canberra in 1926, and Mauger attended public schools in Telopea Park. He served in the Citizen Military Forces from 1936 until 1940, when he enlisted in the RAAF; in 1945 he retired as a sergeant. He was elected to Queanbeyan City Council in 1953, serving until 1959 (as Deputy Mayor 1956, 1958–1959). On 30 May 1942 he married Gwendoline Una Kaye, with whom he had three children.

In 1965, the Labor member for Monaro, John Seiffert, retired. Mauger was selected as the Liberal Party's candidate; he faced Seiffert's son as the Labor candidate and Country Party candidate, and eventually won the seat by 268 votes. He held the seat with safer margins in subsequent elections, and in 1975 was made Minister for Youth, Ethnic and Community Affairs. He resigned both from both the ministry and parliament in 1976, and died shortly afterwards in Queanbeyan.

New South Wales Legislative Assembly
Preceded by John Seiffert	Member for Monaro; 1965–1976	Succeeded by John Akister
