= John Akister =

Australian politician (1937–2024)

The Honourable John Akister

Member of the New South Wales Parliament for Monaro
- In office 1 May 1976 – 22 February 1988
- Preceded by: Steve Mauger
- Succeeded by: Peter Cochran

Personal details
- Born: John Edward Akister; 6 November 1937 Brighton, Sussex, England
- Died: 26 March 2024 (aged 86) Kempsey, New South Wales, Australia
- Citizenship: Australian
- Party: Australian Labor Party
- Spouse: Brenda Ann Pye (m. 1965)
- Occupation: Draughtsman

Military service
- Allegiance: United Kingdom
- Branch/service: British Army
- Years of service: 1959–1961
- Rank: Private
- Unit: Lancashire Regiment

John Edward Akister (6 November 1937 – 19 March 2024) was an Australian politician. He was the Labor Party member for Electoral district of Monaro in the New South Wales Legislative Assembly from 1976 to 1988, and served as a minister from 1984 to 1988.

== Life and career ==
Akister was born in Brighton, England, but was raised in Abbey Home Orphanage in Staveley from 2 weeks to 15 yrs. He was educated at Staveley Public School and Windermere Grammar School in Westmorland, and Salford Technical College. Trained as an electrical fitter and electrical draughtsman, he worked for the Metropolitan-Vickers company from 1954 to 1959, when he began national service as a private in the 1st Battalion of the Lancashire Regiment. He returned to Vickers in 1961. He migrated to Australia in 1963, becoming a draughtsman at A.E.I. Pty Ltd in 1963. He married Brenda Ann Pye on 18 December 1965 in Sydney and moved to Cooma as senior draughtsman with the Snowy Mountains Authority in 1966. He had 2 daughters, Vanessa and Elizabeth. (He joined the Labor Party in 1969 and served as secretary of the [Cooma] branch, New South Wales from 1970 to 1976.

In 1974, Akister was selected as the Labor candidate for the marginal Liberal Party seat of Electoral district of Monaro in the New South Wales Legislative Assembly. Sitting MP Steve Mauger had resigned before the election, leaving the seat vacant, and Akister was narrowly elected in a three-cornered contest with the Liberal and Country parties. In 1984, he became Minister for Corrective Services, as well as holding junior ministries on Rural Matters and assisting the Agriculture Minister. In 1986 he was given additional responsibility as Assistant Minister for Transport. However, in 1988 the Unsworth Government was defeated at the polls, and Akister was one of the members who lost his seat (to National Party candidate Peter Cochran). He became a businessman after leaving politics.

Akister died on 19 March 2024, at the age of 86.

New South Wales Legislative Assembly
Preceded by Steve Mauger	Member for Monaro; 1976–1988	Succeeded by Peter Cochran
