= Nichole Overall =

Australian politician

The Honourable Nichole Overall MLC
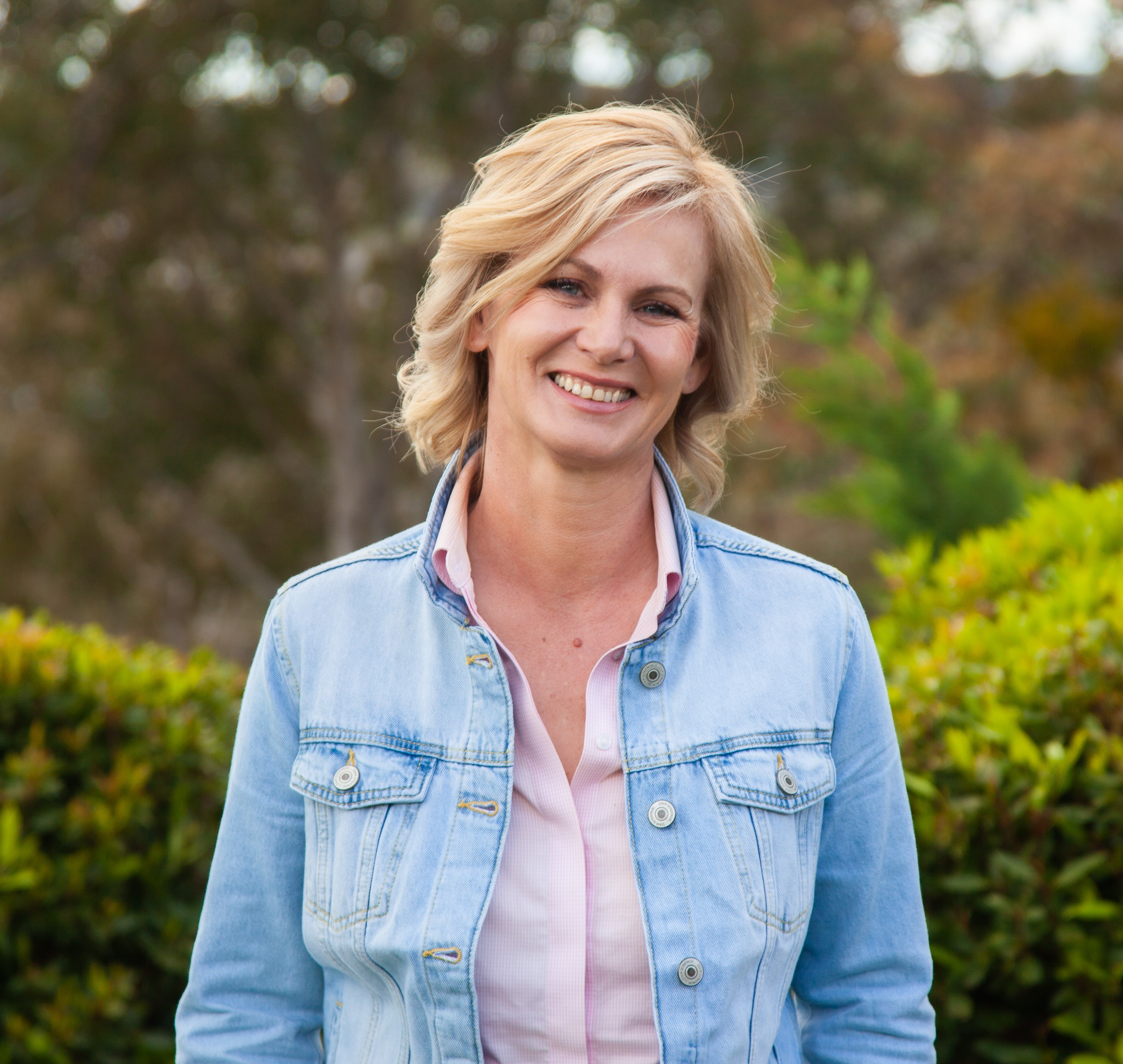
- Overall in 2022

Member of the New South Wales Legislative Council
- Incumbent
- Assumed office 13 February 2025
- Preceded by: Sam Farraway

Member of the New South Wales Legislative Assembly for Monaro
- In office 12 February 2022 – 25 March 2023
- Preceded by: John Barilaro
- Succeeded by: Steve Whan

Personal details
- Born: 1972 (age 53–54) Griffith, New South Wales
- Party: Nationals
- Spouse: Tim Overall (former Mayor of Queanbeyan–Palerang Regional Council)
- Children: Two sons
- Education: University of Canberra
- Occupation: Politician
- Profession: Social historian, journalist and author
- Website: www.nicholeoverall.com.au

Nichole Lorraine Overall is an Australian politician. She was elected to the New South Wales Legislative Assembly at the 2022 Monaro state by-election but was subsequently unseated by Steve Whan on 25 March 2023. She was returned to the Parliament of New South Wales to fill a casual vacancy created by outgoing MLC Sam Farraway.

Overall studied communications at the University of Canberra before becoming writer, social historian and small business owner. For a number of years she has been a columnist with Canberra CityNews and is also a presenter with Canberra radio station 2CC. Her husband, Tim Overall, was a councillor and mayor on Queanbeyan City Council. In 2021 Overall was chosen as the National Party candidate for the Monaro by-election caused by party leader John Barilaro's resignation. She won the by-election on 12 February 2022 and served for just over a year as Member for Monaro until her defeat at the 2023 New South Wales state election.

== Legislative Council ==
On 13 February 2025, Overall was successful in being elected to a casual vacancy in the New South Wales Legislative Council replacing outgoing MLC Sam Farraway. She was preselected by the National Party for election to the Legislative Council on 18 December 2024.

New South Wales Legislative Assembly
Preceded by John Barilaro	Member for Monaro; 2022–2023	Succeeded by Steve Whan
