= David Ryrie =

Australian politician

David Ryrie (16 August 1829 – 13 July 1893) was an Australian politician.

He was born in Sydney to pastoralist Stewart Ryrie and Isabella Cassels. A pastoralist himself, he ran a number of properties with his brother Alexander. On 8 November 1865 he married Ellen Eliza Faunce, with whom he had eleven children. He was elected to the New South Wales Legislative Assembly for Monaro in an 1884 by-election, but did not re-contest the general election the following year. Ryrie died in Sydney in 1893.

== See also ==
- Stewart Ryrie, his father
- Alexander Ryrie, his brother
- William Ryrie, his half brother.

New South Wales Legislative Assembly
Preceded by Robert Tooth	Member for Monaro; 1884–1885; Served alongside: Henry Badgery	Succeeded by Henry Dawson; Harold Stephen
