= Daniel Egan =

Australian politician

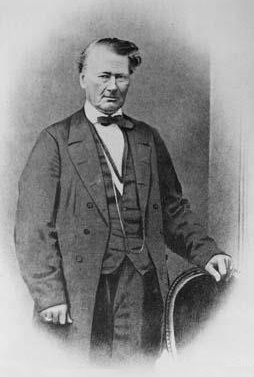

9th Mayor of Sydney
- In office 1853–1853
- Preceded by: William Edward Thurlow
- Succeeded by: George Thorton

Personal details
- Born: c. 1803 Windsor, New South Wales
- Died: 16 October 1870 (aged 66–67) Sydney, New South Wales, Australia

Daniel Egan (c. 1803 – 16 October 1870) was an Australian colonial politician who was a member of the New South Wales Parliament from 1854 to his death in October 1870, serving for the last couple of years as Postmaster-General. Prior to his parliamentary career, Egan was an alderman in the City of Sydney council, serving as mayor in 1853.

== Biography ==
=== Early years ===
Daniel Egan was born in about 1803 in Windsor, New South Wales, the son of Bryan and Mary Egan (one of five children). His father was an Irish convict, transported for life to New South Wales in 1797.^{[A]}

Young Daniel "was reared as a shipwright".

=== Government employment ===
On 1 October 1824 Daniel Egan was appointed to the position of Master Builder and overseer of the Her Majesty's Dockyard in Sydney. In mid-October 1824 a barge, built by "young Egan, a currency lad", was launched at Point Piper in Sydney Harbour.

Daniel Egan and Mary Ann (or Marianne) Piper were married in about 1826. The couple had three children, two sons and a daughter.

Egan supervised the operations of the government dockyard for eleven years under the successive colonial administrations of governors Sir Thomas Brisbane, Sir Ralph Darling and Sir Richard Bourke. Amongst the important works carried out under Egan's supervision was the conversion of the Phoenix ship into a hulk for the reception of colonial prisoners. The dockyard also produced government punts that were operated in settled districts and vessels used for the exploration of the rivers of the colony.

In March 1833 Egan was recorded as part-owner of the schooner Governor Bourke, engaged in trading between Sydney and the Swan River colony in Western Australia.

The government dockyard was closed in 1835. Egan was offered a similar appointment at the imperial dockyard at Trincomalee in Ceylon, which he declined, preferring "to accept a gratuity rather than to leave the colony". He received a gratuity equal in amount to two years' salary.

=== Business and local government ===
After the closure of the government dockyard Egan went into business operating passenger and freight services between Sydney and the settlements of Launceston and Hobart Town in Van Diemen's Land. By March 1836 he was advertising passage on the barque Francis Freeling, described as a "fine fast-sailing Packet Ship". By May 1836 he was operating the Samuel Cunard directly to and from Launceston. In July 1836 Egan purchased the barque Macclesfield at auction. In December 1836 it was reported that Egan had purchased the Francis Freeling outright, to be used "in the Hobart Town trade". By 1837 Egan was operating two vessels between Sydney and Hobart Town, the Marian Watson and the Lady Wellington.

Egan's first wife Mary Ann died in 1838.

His second marriage was to Marianne (or Marian) Cahnac (née Cheers), widow of Henry St. John Cahuac, on 17 July 1843 at St. Mary's Cathedral in Sydney.^{[B]}

In November 1842, with the introduction of district councils to the colony, Egan was one of four aldermen elected to represent the Gipps ward in the first municipal election for the Sydney City Council.

Daniel Egan's business as a merchant was a casualty of the economic depression in the colony during the early 1840s. By September 1843, after his shipping interests had suffered a series of reverses, Egan was declared to be bankrupt. An alderman that became insolvent was not longer eligible to be a city councillor, so soon after Egan's financial situation became known the seat he occupied representing Gipps ward was declared to be vacant.

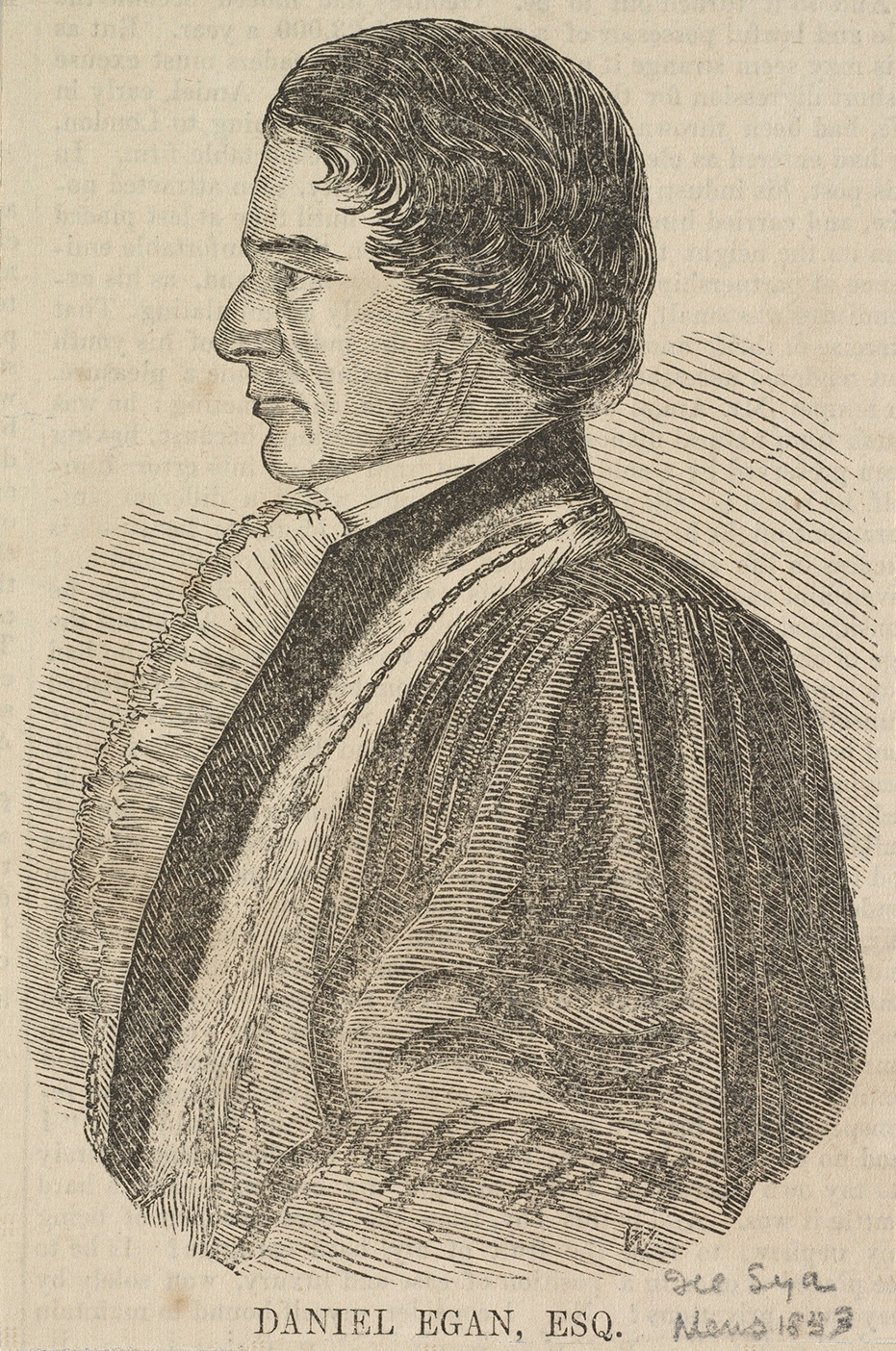
Portrait of Daniel Egan, Mayor of the City of Sydney in 1853.

By 1844 Egan was residing at 103 Hunter Street in Sydney. In May 1844 the following properties and asset belonging to the insolvent estate of Daniel Egan was sold by public auction at the request of Egan's creditors: land at Gipps Town (off Parramatta Road), a farm at Cattai Creek and the schooner Marian Watson. In November 1844 Egan was one of four candidates for municipal elections to fill two vacancies for Gipps ward. However he was unsuccessful at this attempt, running third in the poll.

At the election of city councillors held in November 1846 Egan was elected to represent Gipps ward of the City of Sydney. He served as an alderman of the Sydney council until 1853, after which the council was replaced by city commissioners. Egan served as a magistrate on the Sydney bench from 1848 to 1853 and was considered to be "one of those who was most assiduous in the performance of his duties". He was commissioned as a Justice of the Peace in 1853.

By February 1851 Egan was registered as a Spirit Merchant, trading as Daniel Egan and Co. The business sold wine and beer, as well as spirits, from its stores in George Street. In January 1854 Egan's eldest son, John Piper Egan, was admitted as a partner in the business which was then conducted under the name of Egan and Son.

In December 1852 the annual election for mayor of the City of Sydney was held in the various council wards. Daniel Egan was elected as mayor for the year 1853 "by a majority of votes in the whole of the wards collectively". In a later article in The Empire newspaper, Egan was described as a man "possessing neither education nor natural capacity". The writer added, referring to Egan's career as an alderman: "For many years past he has been known chiefly for his obsequiousness to the local government, with whom his servility has been the means, it is said, of obtaining for him an influence which would never have been accorded to his ability".

By the early 1850s public dissatisfaction had grown in regard to the municipal control of Sydney under an elected council. An article in the Sydney Morning Herald referred to "the defects" in the corporate governance of the city: "At all events, the citizens at large will be satisfied to have got rid of an incubus which has long heavily burdened the city, and exposed it to danger and nuisance entirely inconsistent with the progress of Municipal Government in the mother country". In October 1853, towards the end of Egan's tenure as mayor, the New South Wales parliament passed the 'Sydney Corporation Abolition Act' which allowed for the municipal administration of the city from January 1854 under the centralised and appointed control of three salaried commissioners.

=== Political career ===
In March 1854, with the resignation of the sitting member, it was reported that Egan had nominated as a candidate to contest the election in the New South Wales Legislative Council to represent the Pastoral District of Maneroo. It had been reported that Charles Kemp also intended to be a candidate to represent Maneroo, but in late March he withdrew from the contest "not deeming it advisable to demand a poll", as a result of which Egan was elected unopposed, taking his seat on 1 April 1854.

After the introduction of a bicameral system of government to New South Wales, on 16 April 1956 Egan was elected unopposed as the member for Maneroo in the newly-created Legislative Assembly.

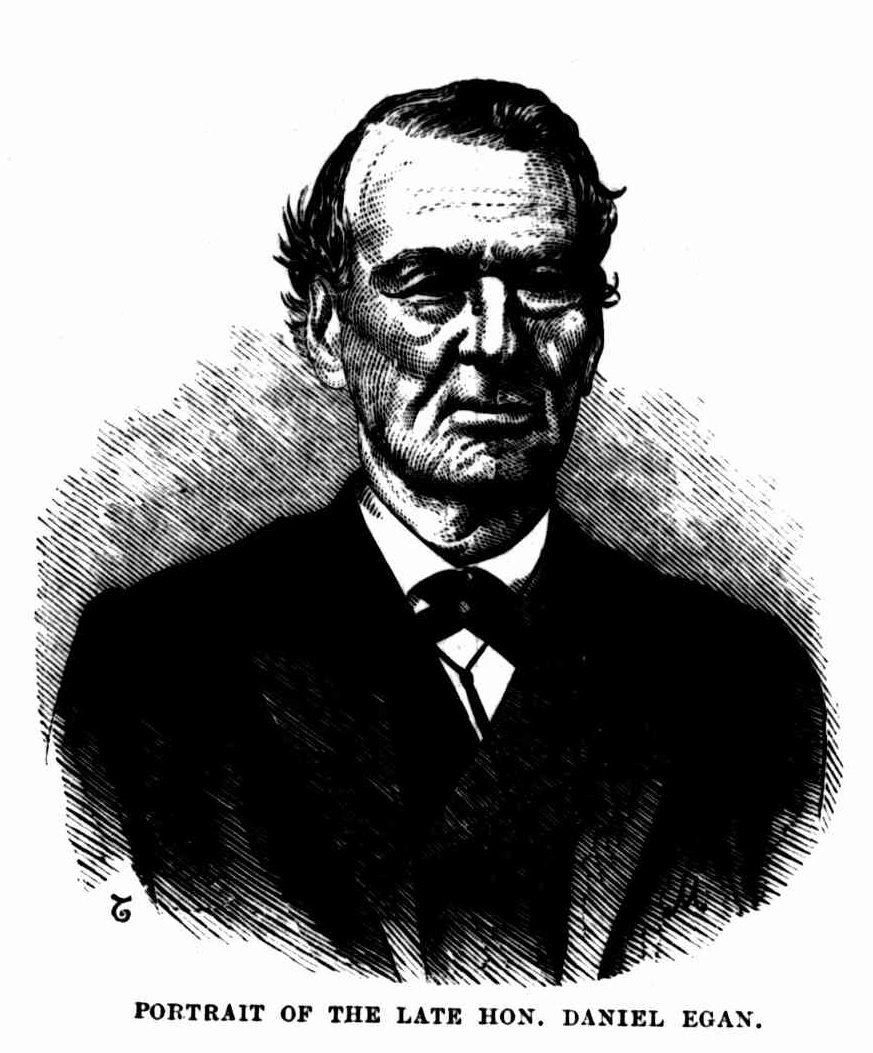
Portrait of Daniel Egan, published in Illustrated Sydney News, 26 October 1870.

Egan's wife Marian and her two children by her first marriage (Henry and Gertrude) were aboard the Dunbar which was wrecked on 20 August 1857 at The Gap, as the ship approached Sydney Heads (the entrance to Sydney Harbour), with the loss of all lives on board (except for one survivor). Marian Egan was described as "a lady of eminent charity and piety". She and her children were returning from England, having travelled there "to afford her children an opportunity to see society, in its more settled and ancient forms".

In October 1857 Egan purchased two 40-acre (16 ha) parcels of land in the northern Sydney region, in an area later known as the suburb of Beacon Hill.

At the general election held in January and February 1858 Egan won the majority of votes (68.3 percent) against another candidate, George Hebden, and was re-elected as the member for Maneroo.

At the general election held in June and early July 1859 Egan stood as a candidate in both of the adjoining electoral districts of Monaro (renamed from Maneroo) and Eden. At the poll for the seat of Eden, held on 23 June, Egan received 55.6 percent of the vote against another candidate, Henry Clarke, and was elected to the seat. At the poll for the seat of Monaro, held a week later, he received only 27.5 percent of the vote against one other candidate, as a result of which he became the member for Eden in the Legislative Assembly. Egan remained as the member for Eden from 23 June 1859 to December 1869.

In general Egan was a supporter of liberal legislation. He was an advocate for the introduction of manhood suffrage under the Cowper administration and supported Robertson's land legislation in 1860 and 1861. However Egan was a determined opponent of the abolition of state aid to religion and the Public Schools Act.

On 27 October 1868 the premier of New South Wales, John Robertson, appointed Daniel Egan as Postmaster-General in his new ministry. Under the constitution, newly-appointed ministers were required to resign to recontest their seats in a by-election. At the by-election in November 1868 Egan was returned unopposed.

At the general election held during December 1869 and early January 1870 Egan stood for the Eden electoral district against Henry Clarke (who had been an unsuccessful candidate in 1859). On this occasion Clarke was elected, attracting 50.5 percent of the vote. Egan contested the adjoining seat of Monaro at the poll held several weeks later, against one other candidate, and was elected with 51.6 percent of the vote. During his campaign for election to the seat of Monaro in January 1870, Egan "suffered a severe attack of gastric fever".

After the January 1870 general election, John Robertson lost the confidence of the Legislative Assembly and was replaced as premier by his colleague, Charles Cowper. The majority of ministers, including Egan, retained their appointments in the transition from the Robertson to the Cowper ministries.

=== Death ===
Daniel Egan died on the afternoon of 16 October 1870, aged about 67, at the Oxford Hotel in Watsons Bay (near Sydney's South Head). He had not been in "robust health for some time". After retiring early on the evening prior to his death, at about eleven o'clock that night the landlady heard "an unusual noise" from his bedroom. Upon entering she found Egan "in a state of insensibility". A doctor was called who determined that the patient was suffering from "effusion on the brain". Egan "continued insensible" until his death the following afternoon. Before he expired Archbishop Polding attended to administer the last rites of the Catholic Church to the dying patient.

Egan was interred in the Roman Catholic cemetery at Petersham on the day following his death. His funeral was attended "by a very large company of friends of the deceased" and was carried out "with the usual religious observances, a large number of Catholic clergymen attending the funeral".

Shortly after his burial Egan's coffin was secretly disinterred and transferred to an unconsecrated section of the cemetery, an act that became a public scandal when the outrage was revealed. It was rumoured that the removal of Egan's remains "was done by order of some of the priests at St. Mary's, although Archbishop Polding is acquitted of all complicity in the proceeding". The motive for the removal was the belief that Egan had lived an "immoral life" as he had been "living with a woman who was not his wife" prior to his death.^{[C]}

In January 1871 the government offered a reward of fifty pounds for information leading to the conviction of "the person or persons concerned in such illegal exhumation of [Egan's] body from the grave in which it was originally placed". In late January and February 1871 the matter was raised in parliament at the instigation of the member for Kiama, David Buchanan. Eventually Archbishop Polding ordered Egan's remains to be reinterred in its original grave.

== Notes ==
A.Bryan Egan was convicted of "administering unlawful oaths" in 1795 at Longford, Ireland, and sentenced to transportation for life. He and his wife Mary arrived at Sydney Cove aboard the convict vessel Britannia in May 1797. Bryan Egan was freed "by servitude" in about 1825.

B.Mary Ann Cahuac (née Cheers) was the widow of Henry St. John Cahuac (1808-1841), a superintendent of convicts who died in November 1841 at Port Macquarie from a fall from his horse. The couple had two children: Henry (born in 1837) and Gertrude (born in 1839).

C.One explanation which led to the disinterment of Egan's remains was stated in the Legislative Assembly by the member for Kiama, John Stewart, on 14 February 1871. Stewart explained that although Egan was initially buried "with the full rites" of the Catholic church, the "removal of his body was purely a matter of business". A day or two after his funeral "a very rich lady", the widow of a man who had bequeathed three hundred thousand pounds to her, approached "the heads of the Church" and "complained that a person whose life had not been quite so pious as it should have been had been buried close to the body of her sainted husband". As expressed by Stewart, the Church officials decided that "the necessities of the Church require particular attention" and "her scruples of conscience had to be satisfied". Consequently Egan's body was removed "at midnight" to avoid a scandal. Stewart contended that "there was no subordinate who dared to do this without having received explicit authority from the head of the Church".

Parliament of New South Wales
Political offices
Preceded by Atkinson Tighe	Postmaster-General of New South Wales; 1868 – 1870	Succeeded by Joseph Docker
New South Wales Legislative Council
Preceded by Arthur Jeffreys	Member for Pastoral District of Maneroo; 1854 – 1856	Council replaced
New South Wales Legislative Assembly
New parliament	Member for Maneroo / Monara; 1856 – 1859	Succeeded by Alexander Hamilton
New district	Member for Eden; 1859 – 1869	Succeeded by Henry Clarke
Preceded by William Grahame	Member for Member for Monaro; Jan – Oct 1870	Succeeded by James Hart
Civic offices
Preceded by William Edward Thurlow	Mayor of Sydney; 1853	Succeeded by George Thornton
