= Harold Stephen =

Journalist and politician in New South Wales, Australia

- Born: 1841; England
- Died: 30 November 1889 (aged 47–48); Annandale

Harold Wilberforce Hindmarsh Stephen (1841 – 30 November 1889) was an Australian politician.

He was born at Penzance in Cornwall to land speculator George Milner Stephen, who would later act as Governor of South Australia, and Mary Hindmarsh, daughter of Rear Admiral Sir John Hindmarsh, South Australia's first governor. He was educated in Melbourne and in Germany. A journalist, he edited two short-lived publications of his own, the Athenaeum and the Critic, and was briefly editor of the Sydney Punch. His family was highly influential in New South Wales: Sir Alfred Stephen was his uncle and Sir Henry Stephen, Montagu Stephen and Septimus Stephen were all cousins. In 1885 Harold Stephen was elected to the New South Wales Legislative Assembly for Monaro. Defeated in 1887, he returned in 1889 but died nine months later in Newtown.

New South Wales Legislative Assembly
| Preceded by Henry Badgery; David Ryrie | Member for Monaro; 1885–1887; Served alongside: Henry Dawson | Succeeded by Thomas O'Mara |
| Preceded by Thomas O'Mara | Member for Monaro; 1889; Served alongside: Henry Dawson | Succeeded by Gus Miller |
