= Robert Lucas-Tooth =

Australian politician

Sir Robert Lucas Lucas-Tooth, 1st Baronet (7 December 1844 – 19 February 1915) was an Australian politician.

He was born in Sydney, the son of Edwin Tooth and Sarah Lucas, and was educated at Eton College. He returned to Australia in 1863, joining the family firm and becoming involved in the brewery business. He owned Kameruka estate, near Bega.

On 2 January 1873, he married Helen Tooth, his first cousin who was a daughter of Frederick Tooth; they had six children. From 1875 he had built an impressive mansion, Swifts, in the Sydney harbour suburb of Darling Point, New South Wales, which was designed in the Gothic revival style. From 1880 to 1884 he represented Monaro in the New South Wales Legislative Assembly.

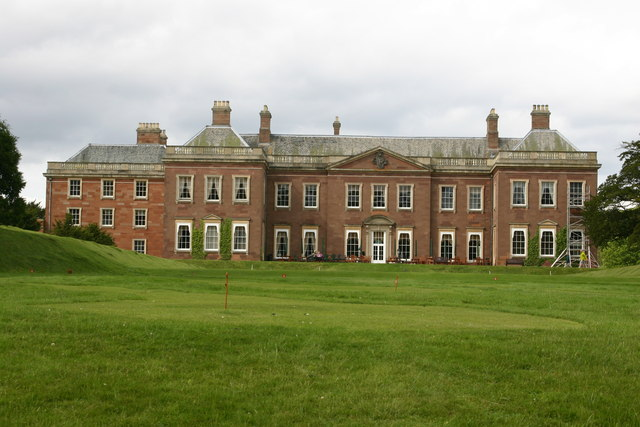
Holme Lacy House, Herefordshire

In 1889, he settled in England, although he remained involved in Australian interests and visited frequently. In 1895 he ran as a Conservative for the House of Commons, but he was defeated.

In 1904, he took the name Lucas-Tooth and was created a baronet. In 1910, he bought Holme Lacy House from the Earl of Chesterfield and modernised it, installing electricity and sewage systems.

As a philanthropist he gave:

- in 1913 a gift of £50,000 to Prince Alexander of Teck to support the prince's fund to assist and extend facilities for the "physical and moral training of boys". His name was given to the fund and a medal named "Lucas-Tooth Boys Training Fund for Efficiency" was created c. 1916 to reward deserving military cadets;
- the same year a donation of £1000 to the Mawson Antarctic Expedition Relief Fund, helping the "Aurora" reach King George V Land and bring back Dr. Douglas Mawson and six others who were over-wintering there after a series of calamities;
- in 1914 he also contributed £10,000 to Lady Dudley's Field Hospital to help the Australian war effort.

He died at Holme Lacy in 1915.

Both his elder sons were killed in action within six weeks of each other in the First World War in 1914 and the youngest, Archibald, who had succeeded him as 2nd Baronet, also died of pneumonia on military service in 1918. Although two of his sons had married, there were no male heirs and the baronetcy thus became extinct.

His wife Helen, Lady Lucas-Tooth (nee Tooth), died in Cheltenham in 1942.

The baronetcy was revived in 1920 through the son of Sir Robert's daughter. Holme Lacy was sold in 1919 to R. Hadden Tebb.

New South Wales Legislative Assembly
Preceded by John Murphy	Member for Monaro; 1880–1884; Served alongside: Henry Badgery	Succeeded by David Ryrie
Baronetage of the United Kingdom
New creation	Baronet (of Queen's Gate); 1906–1915	Succeeded by Sir Archibald Lucas-Tooth
