= Gus Miller (politician) =

Australian politician

Gustave Thomas Carlisle Miller (26 November 1852 – 20 October 1918) was an Australian politician.

He was born in Prospect to farmer William Richardson Miller and Catherine Engel. He was educated at St Philip's and Fort Street schools before becoming a journalist. He managed the Monaro Mercury from 1876 and ran the Cooma Express from 1879. Around 1881 he married Emmeline Annie Hewison at Cooma; they would have seven children. In 1889 he was elected to the New South Wales Legislative Assembly as the member for Monaro, representing the Protectionist Party. In 1901, however, he joined the Labor Party, and represented Monaro in that capacity until his death in Marrickville in 1918.

New South Wales Legislative Assembly
Preceded by Harold Stephen	Member for Monaro; 1889–1918; Served alongside: Henry Dawson; none	Succeeded by John Bailey
