= Kameruka, New South Wales =

Kameruka New South Wales
- Coordinates: 36.740°S 149.709°E
- Population: 192 (SAL 2021)
- Established: 1855
- Postcode(s): 2550
- Location: 455 km (283 mi) SSW of Sydney; 586 km (364 mi) ENE of Melbourne; 215 km (134 mi) ESE of Canberra; 5 km (3 mi) NNW of Candelo; 10 km (6 mi) SW of Bega
- LGA(s): Bega Valley Shire
- County: Auckland
- State electorate(s): Bega
- Federal division(s): Eden-Monaro

Kameruka is a location in New South Wales, Australia, previously a large cattle run. It is located near Candelo, around 27 km south-west of Bega and 450 km south of Sydney.

== History ==
In 1834 the Imlay brothers, Alexander, George and Peter, took the lease on the 192,640 acres (77,960 ha) pastoral property.

As a result of the 1840s depression, they were forced to relinquish the lease, which was taken up by the Walker brothers, William, (Note: William Walker (1787–1854), a Scotsman who earlier settled in Tasmania) Edward and James, who named it Kameruka or Kameruka–Warragubra (Note: Kameruka was of 170 square miles (109,000 acres) and Warragubra 200 square miles (128,000 acres)) and built a four-room Georgian mansion on the property.

In 1852 the Walker brothers disposed of the property to the Twofold Bay Pastoral Company, whose members included the Manning brothers, the Tooth brothers and T. S. Mort, and amalgamated with their other properties, to form one 400 000 acre property, with Kameruka as its head station and James Manning its resident manager. The Twofold Bay company was active in bringing out German immigrants.

The Company was disbanded in 1860 and Manning purchased Kameruka, which he sold in 1862 to the Tooth family, managed by Robert Tooth (1844–1915), who became its owner in 1864. He subdivided the land into leaseholds, which were taken up by farming families, and built an Anglican church, designed by Edmund Blacket.
