= Electoral district of Monaro =

State electoral district of New South Wales, Australia

Monaro New South Wales—Legislative Assembly
- Interactive map of district boundaries from the 2023 state election
- State: New South Wales
- Dates current: 1856–1920, 1927–present
- MP: Steve Whan
- Party: Labor
- Namesake: Monaro Region
- Electors: 59,514 (2023)
- Area: 20,479.02 km^{2} (7,907.0 sq mi)
- Demographic: Rural
Electorates around Monaro:
Goulburn	Goulburn	Kiama
ACT; Wagga Wagga; Albury	Monaro	South Coast; Bega
Victoria	Victoria	Victoria

Monaro (/məˈnɛəroʊ/ mə-NAIR-oh), also known as Maneroo (1856–1858), Monara (1858–1879) and Manaro (1894–1904), is an electoral district of the Legislative Assembly of the Australian state of New South Wales. The member for Monaro has been Steve Whan of the Labor Party since 2023.

Monaro is a regional district in the south of the state, bordering both the Australian Capital Territory and Victoria. It encompasses the Queanbeyan–Palerang Regional Council and Snowy Monaro Regional Council. Significant population centres include Queanbeyan, Bungendore, Braidwood, Cooma, Bombala, Captains Flat, Nimmitabel, Delegate, Bredbo, Michelago, Berridale, Jindabyne and Adaminaby.

== History ==
The electorate was created in 1856 for the First Parliament under the name Maneroo, derived from an Aboriginal name for the area, now spelt Monaro. It was renamed Monara for the second Parliament in February 1858. The spelling was changed to Monaro from 1877 until 1894. It elected two members between 1880 and 1894. In 1894, single-member electorates were introduced statewide and part of the electorate (including Bombala), was absorbed into Eden-Bombala. At this time the spelling was changed to Manaro.

The 1903 New South Wales referendum required the number of members of the Legislative Assembly to be reduced from 125 to 90; the district was expanded to include parts of Queanbeyan and the abolished seat of Eden-Bombala and the spelling reverted to Monaro. In 1913, it absorbed much of the electoral district of Queanbeyan, including Queanbeyan, which is its major city. In 1920, with the introduction of proportional representation, it was absorbed into Goulburn, along with Bega. It was recreated in 1927.

Nationals member Nichole Overall made history in 2022 by being elected as the first female representative of the Monaro. Overall's husband was previously mayor of the City of Queanbeyan.

== Members for Monaro ==
First incarnation (1858–1920)
1856–1880, 1 member
Member	Party	Term			
Daniel Egan	None	1856–1859			
Alexander Hamilton	None	1859–1860			
Thomas Garrett	None	1860–1864			
James Martin	None	1864–1865			
William Grahame	None	1865–1869			
Daniel Egan	None	1870–1870			
James Hart	None	1870–1872			
William Grahame	None	1872–1874			
Alexander Montague	None	1875–1877			
John Murphy	None	1877–1880			
1880–1894, 2 members
Member	Party	Term	Member	Party	Term
Henry Badgery	None	1880–1885	Robert Tooth	None	1880–1884
Henry Badgery	None	1880–1885	David Ryrie	None	1884–1885
Henry Dawson	None	1885–1887	Harold Stephen	None	1885–1887
Henry Dawson	Protectionist	1887–1894	Thomas O'Mara	Ind. Protectionist	1887–1889
Henry Dawson	Protectionist	1887–1894	Harold Stephen	Protectionist	1889–1889
Henry Dawson	Protectionist	1887–1894	Gus Miller	Protectionist	1889–1894
1894–1920, 1 member
Member	Party	Term			
Gus Miller	Protectionist	1894–1901			
Gus Miller	Labour	1901–1918			
John Bailey	Labor	1918–1920			
Second incarnation (1927–present)
1927–present 1 member
Member	Party	Term			
William Hedges	Country	1927–1941			
John Seiffert	Labor	1941–1950			
John Seiffert	Independent Labor	1950–1953			
John Seiffert	Labor	1953–1965			
Steve Mauger	Liberal	1965–1976			
John Akister	Labor	1976–1988			
Peter Cochran	National	1988–1999			
Peter Webb	National	1999–2003			
Steve Whan	Labor	2003–2011			
John Barilaro	National	2011–2021			
Nichole Overall	National	2022–2023			
Steve Whan	Labor	2023–present			

== Election results ==
2023 New South Wales state election: Monaro
Party	Candidate	Votes	%	±%
National	Nichole Overall	19,890	39.1	−13.2
Labor	Steve Whan	19,401	38.1	+11.0
Greens	Jenny Goldie	3,924	7.7	−0.2
Shooters, Fishers, Farmers	Chris Pryor	3,077	6.1	−1.7
Independent	Andrew Thaler	1,855	3.6	+3.6
Legalise Cannabis	Josie Tanson	1,722	3.4	+3.4
Sustainable Australia	James Holgate	987	1.9	+1.9
Total formal votes		50,856	97.5	+0.1
Informal votes		1,313	2.5	−0.1
Turnout		52,169	87.7	−0.2
Two-party-preferred result
Labor	Steve Whan	23,757	52.3	+13.9
National	Nichole Overall	21,676	47.7	−13.9
Labor gain from National		Swing	+13.9	
