= Electoral results for the district of Kiama =

Election results for Kiama, New South Wales, Australia

Kiama, an electoral district of the Legislative Assembly in the Australian state of New South Wales, had two incarnations, the first from 1859 to 1904, the second from 1981 until the present.

== Members ==
First incarnation (1859–1904)
| Election | Member | Party |
|---|---|---|
| 1859 | Samuel Gray | None |
| 1860 | Samuel Gray | None |
| 1864 by | Henry Parkes | None |
| 1864 | Henry Parkes | None |
| 1869 | Henry Parkes | None |
| 1870 by | Henry Parkes | None |
| 1871 by | John Stewart | None |
| 1872 | John Stewart | None |
| 1874 | Samuel Charles | None |
| 1877 | Samuel Charles | None |
| 1880 by | Harman Tarrant | None |
| 1880 | Harman Tarrant | None |
| 1882 | Harman Tarrant | None |
| 1885 | Harman Tarrant | None |
| 1887 by | Angus Cameron | Free Trade |
| 1887 | Angus Cameron | Free Trade |
| 1889 | George Fuller | Free Trade |
| 1891 | George Fuller | Free Trade |
| 1894 | Alexander Campbell | Ind. Protectionist |
| 1895 | Alexander Campbell | Protectionist |
| 1898 | Alexander Campbell | Protectionist |
| 1901 | Alexander Campbell | Progressive |
Second incarnation (1981–present)
| Election | Member | Party |
| 1981 | Bill Knott | Labor |
| 1984 | Bill Knott | Labor |
| 1986 by | Bob Harrison | Labor |
| 1988 | Bob Harrison | Labor |
| 1991 | Bob Harrison | Labor |
| 1995 | Bob Harrison | Labor |
| 1999 | Matt Brown | Labor |
| 2003 | Matt Brown | Labor |
| 2007 | Matt Brown | Labor |
| 2011 | Gareth Ward | Liberal |
| 2015 | Gareth Ward | Liberal |
| 2019 | Gareth Ward | Liberal |
| 2023 | Gareth Ward | Independent |
| 2025 by | Katelin McInerney | Labor |

== Election results ==
=== Elections in the 2020s ===
==== 2025 by-election ====
2025 Kiama state by-election
| Party | Candidate | Votes | % | ±% |
|---|---|---|---|---|
| Labor | Katelin McInerney | 18,622 | 37.32 | +2.93 |
| Liberal | Serena Copley | 13,226 | 26.51 | +14.48 |
| Independent | Kate Dezarnaulds | 5,225 | 10.47 | +10.47 |
| Greens | Tonia Gray | 4,074 | 8.17 | –2.97 |
| Legalise Cannabis | Don Fuggle | 2,550 | 5.11 | +5.11 |
| Shooters, Fishers, Farmers | Felix Nelson | 2,543 | 5.10 | +5.10 |
| Libertarian | Joshua Beer | 895 | 1.79 | +1.79 |
| Independent | Lisa Cotton | 676 | 1.35 | +1.35 |
| Animal Justice | Ellie Robertson | 622 | 1.25 | +1.25 |
| Independent | Andrew Thaler | 544 | 1.09 | +1.09 |
| Independent | Roger Woodward | 429 | 0.86 | +0.86 |
| Sustainable Australia | Ken Davis | 420 | 0.84 | –2.81 |
| Independent | Cyrille Jeufo Keuheu | 69 | 0.14 | +0.14 |
| Total formal votes | | 49,895 | 96.16 | −0.74 |
| Informal votes | | 1,995 | 3.84 | +0.74 |
| Turnout | | 51,890 | 83.04 | −6.78 |
Two-party-preferred result
| Labor | Katelin McInerney | 23,313 | 60.19 | –9.54 |
| Liberal | Serena Copley | 15,421 | 39.81 | +9.54 |
| Labor gain from Independent | | Swing | –9.54 | |

==== 2023 ====
2023 New South Wales state election: Kiama
| Party | Candidate | Votes | % | ±% |
|---|---|---|---|---|
| Independent | Gareth Ward | 20,316 | 38.79 | +38.79 |
| Labor | Katelin McInerney | 18,010 | 34.39 | +6.19 |
| Liberal | Melanie Gibbons | 6,301 | 12.03 | −41.56 |
| Greens | Tonia Gray | 5,833 | 11.14 | −0.74 |
| Sustainable Australia | John Gill | 1,911 | 3.65 | +0.73 |
| Total formal votes | | 52,371 | 96.90 | +0.07 |
| Informal votes | | 1,678 | 3.10 | −0.07 |
| Turnout | | 54,049 | 89.82 | −1.28 |
Notional two-party-preferred count
| Labor | Katelin McInerney | 24,564 | 69.73 | +31.74 |
| Liberal | Melanie Gibbons | 10,665 | 30.27 | −31.74 |
Two-candidate-preferred result
| Independent | Gareth Ward | 23,018 | 50.76 | +50.76 |
| Labor | Katelin McInerney | 22,329 | 49.24 | +11.25 |
| Member changed to Independent from Liberal | | | | |

=== Elections in the 2010s ===
==== 2019 ====
2019 New South Wales state election: Kiama
| Party | Candidate | Votes | % | ±% |
|---|---|---|---|---|
| Liberal | Gareth Ward | 26,230 | 53.59 | +1.98 |
| Labor | Anthony Higgins | 13,803 | 28.20 | −3.85 |
| Greens | Nina Digiglio | 5,815 | 11.88 | +0.83 |
| Christian Democrats | John Kadwell | 1,671 | 3.41 | +0.26 |
| Sustainable Australia | Anne Whatman | 1,427 | 2.92 | +2.92 |
| Total formal votes | | 48,946 | 96.83 | −0.36 |
| Informal votes | | 1,603 | 3.17 | +0.36 |
| Turnout | | 50,549 | 91.10 | −1.26 |
Two-party-preferred result
| Liberal | Gareth Ward | 28,016 | 62.01 | +3.35 |
| Labor | Anthony Higgins | 17,167 | 37.99 | −3.35 |
| Liberal hold | | Swing | +3.35 | |

==== 2015 ====
2015 New South Wales state election: Kiama
| Party | Candidate | Votes | % | ±% |
|---|---|---|---|---|
| Liberal | Gareth Ward | 24,618 | 51.6 | +8.0 |
| Labor | Glenn Kolomeitz | 15,288 | 32.1 | +4.4 |
| Greens | Terry Barratt | 5,271 | 11.1 | +2.2 |
| Christian Democrats | Steve Ryan | 1,505 | 3.2 | −0.7 |
| No Land Tax | Carmel Pellegrini | 1,016 | 2.1 | +2.1 |
| Total formal votes | | 47,698 | 97.2 | −0.0 |
| Informal votes | | 1,382 | 2.8 | +0.0 |
| Turnout | | 49,080 | 92.4 | +2.0 |
Two-party-preferred result
| Liberal | Gareth Ward | 26,114 | 58.7 | +0.1 |
| Labor | Glenn Kolomeitz | 18,404 | 41.3 | −0.1 |
| Liberal hold | | Swing | +0.1 | |

==== 2011 ====
2011 New South Wales state election: Kiama
| Party | Candidate | Votes | % | ±% |
|---|---|---|---|---|
| Liberal | Gareth Ward | 19,898 | 42.5 | +12.0 |
| Labor | Matt Brown | 13,366 | 28.6 | −22.1 |
| Independent | Sandra McCarthy | 6,009 | 12.8 | +12.8 |
| Greens | Ben Van Der Wijngaart | 4,126 | 8.8 | +0.2 |
| Christian Democrats | Steve Ryan | 1,805 | 3.9 | −0.9 |
| Independent | Adrian Daly | 1,576 | 3.4 | +3.4 |
| Total formal votes | | 46,780 | 97.7 | −0.2 |
| Informal votes | | 1,091 | 2.3 | +0.2 |
| Turnout | | 47,871 | 94.6 | +0.5 |
Two-party-preferred result
| Liberal | Gareth Ward | 23,030 | 57.5 | +19.4 |
| Labor | Matt Brown | 17,052 | 42.5 | −19.4 |
| Liberal gain from Labor | | Swing | +19.4 | |

=== Elections in the 2000s ===
==== 2007 ====
2007 New South Wales state election: Kiama
| Party | Candidate | Votes | % | ±% |
|---|---|---|---|---|
| Labor | Matt Brown | 21,971 | 50.7 | +4.1 |
| Liberal | Ann Sudmalis | 13,224 | 30.5 | −2.1 |
| Greens | Ben van der Wijngaart | 3,759 | 8.7 | −0.6 |
| Christian Democrats | John Kadwell | 2,082 | 4.8 | +0.6 |
| Fishing Party | Garth Bridge | 1,680 | 3.9 | +3.9 |
| AAFI | Jack Burnett | 645 | 1.5 | +0.7 |
| Total formal votes | | 43,361 | 98.0 | +0.1 |
| Informal votes | | 902 | 2.0 | −0.1 |
| Turnout | | 44,263 | 94.1 | |
Two-party-preferred result
| Labor | Matt Brown | 24,910 | 62.0 | +3.7 |
| Liberal | Ann Sudmalis | 15,273 | 38.0 | −3.7 |
| Labor hold | | Swing | +3.7 | |

==== 2003 ====
2003 New South Wales state election: Kiama
| Party | Candidate | Votes | % | ±% |
|---|---|---|---|---|
| Labor | Matt Brown | 25,074 | 56.2 | +6.8 |
| Liberal | Danielle Jones | 11,993 | 26.9 | +5.1 |
| Greens | Howard Jones | 4,107 | 9.2 | +1.5 |
| Christian Democrats | John Kadwell | 1,667 | 3.7 | −0.6 |
| One Nation | Helga Green | 698 | 1.6 | −7.6 |
| Democrats | Henry Collier | 529 | 1.2 | −2.1 |
| AAFI | Clive Curnow | 523 | 1.2 | +0.0 |
| Total formal votes | | 44,591 | 97.7 | +0.1 |
| Informal votes | | 1,059 | 2.3 | −0.1 |
| Turnout | | 45,650 | 93.9 | |
Two-party-preferred result
| Labor | Matt Brown | 27,208 | 66.9 | −0.8 |
| Liberal | Danielle Jones | 13,471 | 33.1 | +0.8 |
| Labor hold | | Swing | −0.8 | |

=== Elections in the 1990s ===
==== 1999 ====
1999 New South Wales state election: Kiama
| Party | Candidate | Votes | % | ±% |
|---|---|---|---|---|
| Labor | Matt Brown | 20,236 | 49.4 | −7.1 |
| Liberal | Charlie Mifsud | 8,936 | 21.8 | −9.9 |
| One Nation | Dan Orr | 3,765 | 9.2 | +9.2 |
| Greens | Jim Bradley | 3,157 | 7.7 | −3.9 |
| Christian Democrats | John Kadwell | 1,774 | 4.3 | +4.2 |
| Democrats | Henry Collier | 1,363 | 3.3 | +3.2 |
| Independent | Philip McLeod | 1,234 | 3.0 | +3.0 |
| AAFI | John Murray | 472 | 1.2 | +1.2 |
| Total formal votes | | 40,937 | 97.6 | +3.4 |
| Informal votes | | 1,018 | 2.4 | −3.4 |
| Turnout | | 41,955 | 94.7 | |
Two-party-preferred result
| Labor | Matt Brown | 23,048 | 67.7 | +3.1 |
| Liberal | Charlie Mifsud | 10,995 | 32.3 | −3.1 |
| Labor hold | | Swing | +3.1 | |

==== 1995 ====
1995 New South Wales state election: Kiama
| Party | Candidate | Votes | % | ±% |
|---|---|---|---|---|
| Labor | Bob Harrison | 20,385 | 54.3 | +0.7 |
| Liberal | Jason Collins | 12,814 | 34.2 | +1.4 |
| Greens | Karla Sperling | 4,319 | 11.5 | +11.5 |
| Total formal votes | | 37,518 | 94.3 | +4.0 |
| Informal votes | | 2,275 | 5.7 | −4.0 |
| Turnout | | 39,793 | 94.2 | |
Two-party-preferred result
| Labor | Bob Harrison | 22,472 | 62.2 | +0.8 |
| Liberal | Jason Collins | 13,677 | 37.8 | −0.8 |
| Labor hold | | Swing | +0.8 | |

==== 1991 ====
1991 New South Wales state election: Kiama
| Party | Candidate | Votes | % | ±% |
|---|---|---|---|---|
| Labor | Bob Harrison | 16,925 | 53.6 | +3.2 |
| Liberal | Phillip Motbey | 10,345 | 32.8 | −9.7 |
| Democrats | Kerry Sharpe | 2,648 | 8.4 | +7.2 |
| Call to Australia | Glen Ryan | 1,660 | 5.3 | +4.6 |
| Total formal votes | | 31,578 | 90.3 | −6.4 |
| Informal votes | | 3,382 | 9.7 | +6.4 |
| Turnout | | 34,960 | 94.4 | |
Two-party-preferred result
| Labor | Bob Harrison | 18,524 | 61.4 | +7.8 |
| Liberal | Phillip Motbey | 11,644 | 38.6 | −7.8 |
| Labor hold | | Swing | +7.8 | |

=== Elections in the 1980s ===
==== 1988 ====
1988 New South Wales state election: Kiama
| Party | Candidate | Votes | % | ±% |
|---|---|---|---|---|
| Labor | Bob Harrison | 18,122 | 61.4 | −1.7 |
| Liberal | Kevin Baker | 11,408 | 38.6 | +1.7 |
| Total formal votes | | 29,530 | 96.5 | −1.5 |
| Informal votes | | 1,080 | 3.5 | +1.5 |
| Turnout | | 30,610 | 94.6 | |
| Labor hold | | Swing | −1.7 | |

==== 1986 by-election ====
1986 Kiama by-election Saturday 1 February
| Party | Candidate | Votes | % | ±% |
|---|---|---|---|---|
| Labor | Bob Harrison | 16,702 | 51.8 | −6.9 |
| Liberal | Clyde Poulton | 10,300 | 32.0 | −9.3 |
| Independent | Janice Tanner | 1,655 | 5.1 | |
| Call to Australia | Louise Ollett | 1,603 | 5.0 | |
| Marijuana | Nicholas Brash | 1,268 | 3.9 | |
| Democrats | Valeria George | 702 | 2.2 | |
| Total formal votes | | 32,230 | 98.3 | |
| Informal votes | | 547 | 1.7 | |
| Turnout | | 32,777 | 86.2 | |
| Labor hold | | Swing | | |

Labor Party member Bill Knott resigned.

==== 1984 ====
1984 New South Wales state election: Kiama
| Party | Candidate | Votes | % | ±% |
|---|---|---|---|---|
| Labor | Bill Knott | 19,636 | 58.7 | −1.2 |
| Liberal | Warren Steel | 13,797 | 41.3 | +1.2 |
| Total formal votes | | 33,433 | 98.0 | −0.9 |
| Informal votes | | 684 | 2.0 | +0.9 |
| Turnout | | 34,117 | 93.3 | +1.2 |
| Labor hold | | Swing | −1.2 | |

==== 1981 ====
1981 New South Wales state election: Kiama
| Party | Candidate | Votes | % | ±% |
|---|---|---|---|---|
| Labor | Bill Knott | 17,951 | 59.9 | |
| Liberal | James Chittick | 11,995 | 40.1 | |
| Total formal votes | | 29,946 | 97.1 | |
| Informal votes | | 906 | 2.9 | |
| Turnout | | 30,852 | 92.1 | |
| Labor notional hold | | Swing | −2.1 | |

District re-created

==== 1904–1981 ====
District abolished

==== 1901 ====
This section is an excerpt from 1901 New South Wales state election § Kiama

1901 New South Wales state election: Kiama
| Party | Candidate | Votes | % | ±% |
|---|---|---|---|---|
| Progressive | Alexander Campbell | 710 | 54.4 | +2.9 |
| Liberal Reform | John Waugh | 595 | 45.6 | −2.9 |
| Total formal votes | | 1,305 | 100.0 | +0.2 |
| Informal votes | | 0 | 0.0 | −0.2 |
| Turnout | | 1,305 | 66.6 | −2.2 |
| Progressive hold | | | | |

=== Elections in the 1890s ===
==== 1898 ====
This section is an excerpt from 1898 New South Wales colonial election § Kiama

1898 New South Wales colonial election: Kiama
| Party | Candidate | Votes | % | ±% |
|---|---|---|---|---|
| National Federal | Alexander Campbell | 707 | 51.5 | |
| Free Trade | George Fuller | 665 | 48.5 | |
| Total formal votes | | 1,372 | 99.9 | |
| Informal votes | | 2 | 0.2 | |
| Turnout | | 1,374 | 68.7 | |
| National Federal hold | | | | |

==== 1895 ====
This section is an excerpt from 1895 New South Wales colonial election § Kiama

1895 New South Wales colonial election: Kiama
| Party | Candidate | Votes | % | ±% |
|---|---|---|---|---|
| Protectionist | Alexander Campbell | 731 | 55.4 | |
| Free Trade | John Cole | 588 | 44.6 | |
| Total formal votes | | 1,319 | 99.3 | |
| Informal votes | | 10 | 0.8 | |
| Turnout | | 1,329 | 71.8 | |
| Protectionist hold | | | | |

==== 1894 ====
This section is an excerpt from 1894 New South Wales colonial election § Kiama

1894 New South Wales colonial election: Kiama
| Party | Candidate | Votes | % | ±% |
|---|---|---|---|---|
| Ind. Protectionist | Alexander Campbell | 811 | 50.9 | |
| Free Trade | George Fuller | 781 | 49.1 | |
| Total formal votes | | 1,592 | 98.8 | |
| Informal votes | | 20 | 1.2 | |
| Turnout | | 1,612 | 86.8 | |
| Ind. Protectionist gain from Free Trade | | | | |

==== 1891 ====
This section is an excerpt from 1891 New South Wales colonial election § Kiama

1891 New South Wales colonial election: Kiama Friday 19 June
| Party | Candidate | Votes | % | ±% |
|---|---|---|---|---|
| Free Trade | George Fuller (elected) | 894 | 69.0 | |
| Protectionist | Thomas Kennedy | 402 | 31.0 | |
| Total formal votes | | 1,296 | 97.8 | |
| Informal votes | | 29 | 2.2 | |
| Turnout | | 1,325 | 71.7 | |
| Free Trade hold | | | | |

=== Elections in the 1880s ===
==== 1889 ====
This section is an excerpt from 1889 New South Wales colonial election § Kiama

1889 New South Wales colonial election: Kiama Saturday 9 February
| Party | Candidate | Votes | % | ±% |
|---|---|---|---|---|
| Free Trade | George Fuller (elected) | 528 | 47.2 | |
| Free Trade | John Cole | 495 | 44.2 | |
| Protectionist | John Roseby | 96 | 8.6 | |
| Total formal votes | | 1,119 | 98.2 | |
| Informal votes | | 21 | 1.8 | |
| Turnout | | 1,140 | 69.1 | |
| Free Trade hold | | | | |

==== 1887 ====
This section is an excerpt from 1887 New South Wales colonial election § Kiama

1887 New South Wales colonial election: Kiama Wednesday 9 February
| Party | Candidate | Votes | % | ±% |
|---|---|---|---|---|
| Free Trade | Angus Cameron (re-elected) | unopposed | | |

==== 1887 by-election ====
1887 Kiama by-election Thursday 13 January
| Candidate | Votes | % |
|---|---|---|
| Angus Cameron (elected) | 673 | 64.3 |
| Bruce Smith | 373 | 35.7 |
| Total formal votes | 1,046 | 100.0 |
| Informal votes | 0 | 0.0 |
| Turnout | 1,046 | 64.5 |

Harman Tarrant resigned.

==== 1885 ====
This section is an excerpt from 1885 New South Wales colonial election § Kiama

1885 New South Wales colonial election: Kiama Friday 16 October
| Candidate | Votes | % |
|---|---|---|
| Harman Tarrant (re-elected) | 574 | 61.0 |
| Philip Holdsworth | 367 | 39.0 |
| Total formal votes | 941 | 97.7 |
| Informal votes | 22 | 2.3 |
| Turnout | 963 | 61.5 |

==== 1882 ====
This section is an excerpt from 1882 New South Wales colonial election § Kiama

1882 New South Wales colonial election: Kiama Monday 11 December
| Candidate | Votes | % |
|---|---|---|
| Harman Tarrant (re-elected) | 545 | 59.4 |
| John Davies | 372 | 40.6 |
| Total formal votes | 917 | 98.7 |
| Informal votes | 12 | 1.3 |
| Turnout | 929 | 67.4 |

==== 1880 ====
This section is an excerpt from 1880 New South Wales colonial election § Kiama

1880 New South Wales colonial election: Kiama Saturday 27 November
| Candidate | Votes | % |
|---|---|---|
| Harman Tarrant (re-elected) | unopposed | |

==== 1880 by-election ====
1880 Kiama by-election Friday 2 July
| Candidate | Votes | % |
|---|---|---|
| Harman Tarrant (elected) | 450 | 82.9 |
| William Coulter | 93 | 17.1 |
| Total formal votes | 543 | 100.0 |
| Informal votes | 0 | 0.0 |
| Turnout | 543 | 45.3 |

Samuel Charles resigned.

==== 1871 by-election ====
1871 Kiama by-election Thursday 12 January
| Candidate | Votes | % |
|---|---|---|
| John Stewart | unopposed | |

Henry Parkes resigned due to bankruptcy.

==== 1870 by-election ====
1870 Kiama by-election Thursday 3 November
| Candidate | Votes | % |
|---|---|---|
| Henry Parkes (re-elected) | 472 | 58.0 |
| Samuel Gray | 342 | 42.0 |
| Total formal votes | 824 | 100.0 |
| Informal votes | 0 | 0.0 |
| Turnout | 824 | 67.7 |

Henry Parkes resigned due to financial difficulties.

=== Elections in the 1870s ===
==== 1877 ====
1877 New South Wales colonial election: Kiama Monday 29 October
| Candidate | Votes | % |
|---|---|---|
| Samuel Charles (re-elected) | unopposed | |

==== 1874 ====
This section is an excerpt from 1874-75 New South Wales colonial election § Kiama

1874–75 New South Wales colonial election: Kiama Friday 18 December 1874
| Candidate | Votes | % |
|---|---|---|
| Samuel Charles (elected) | 405 | 53.2 |
| John Stewart (defeated) | 357 | 46.9 |
| Total formal votes | 762 | 100.0 |
| Informal votes | 0 | 0.0 |
| Turnout | 776 | 66.3 |

==== 1872 ====
This section is an excerpt from 1872 New South Wales colonial election § Kiama

1872 New South Wales colonial election: Kiama Friday 23 February
| Candidate | Votes | % |
|---|---|---|
| John Stewart (re-elected) | unopposed | |

=== Elections in the 1860s ===
==== 1869 ====
This section is an excerpt from 1869-70 New South Wales colonial election § Kiama

1869–70 New South Wales colonial election: Kiama Tuesday 14 December 1869
| Candidate | Votes | % |
|---|---|---|
| Henry Parkes (re-elected) | 581 | 57.4 |
| Samuel Gray | 432 | 42.7 |
| Total formal votes | 1,013 | 98.9 |
| Informal votes | 11 | 1.1 |
| Turnout | 1,024 | 79.2 |

==== 1864 ====
This section is an excerpt from 1864–65 New South Wales colonial election § Kiama

1864–65 New South Wales colonial election: Kiama Tuesday 20 December 1864
| Candidate | Votes | % |
|---|---|---|
| Henry Parkes (re-elected) | 578 | 62.1 |
| Samuel Charles | 353 | 37.9 |
| Total formal votes | 931 | 100.0 |
| Informal votes | 0 | 0.0 |
| Turnout | 931 | 76.6 |

==== 1864 by-election ====
1864 Kiama by-election Friday 29 April
| Candidate | Votes | % |
|---|---|---|
| Henry Parkes (elected) | 495 | 60.1 |
| George Hamilton | 329 | 39.9 |
| Total formal votes | 824 | 100.0 |
| Informal votes | 0 | 0.0 |
| Turnout | 824 | 67.7 |

Samuel Gray resigned.

==== 1860 ====
This section is an excerpt from 1860 New South Wales colonial election § Kiama

1860 New South Wales colonial election: Kiama Thursday 13 December
| Candidate | Votes | % |
|---|---|---|
| Samuel Gray (re-elected) | unopposed | |

=== Elections in the 1850s ===
==== 1859 ====
This section is an excerpt from 1859 New South Wales colonial election § Kiama

1859 New South Wales colonial election: Kiama Thursday 16 June
| Candidate | Votes | % |
|---|---|---|
| Samuel Gray (elected) | 482 | 70.4 |
| George Grey | 201 | 29.3 |
| Francis Carberry | 2 | 0.3 |
| Total formal votes | 685 | 100.0 |
| Informal votes | 0 | 0.0 |
| Turnout | 735 | 65.6 |
