= 1864 Kiama colonial by-election =

By-election in New South Wales, Australia

A by-election was held for the New South Wales Legislative Assembly electorate of Kiama on 29 April 1864 because of the resignation of Samuel Gray to attend to his business interests.

== Dates ==
Date	Event
2 April 1864	Samuel Gray resigned.
13 April 1864	Writ of election issued by the Speaker of the Legislative Assembly and close of electoral rolls.
26 April 1864	Nominations
29 April 1864	Polling day
6 May 1864	Return of writ

== Results ==
1864 Kiama by-election Friday 29 April
Candidate	Votes	%
Henry Parkes (elected)	495	60.1
George Hamilton	329	39.9
Total formal votes	824	100.0
Informal votes	0	0.0
Turnout	824	67.7

== See also ==
- Electoral results for the district of Kiama
- List of New South Wales state by-elections
