= 1870 Kiama colonial by-election =

By-election in New South Wales, Australia

A by-election was held for the New South Wales Legislative Assembly electorate of Kiama on 3 November 1870 because of the resignation of Henry Parkes due to financial difficulties following the failure of his importing venture.

== Dates ==
Date	Event
14 October 1870	Henry Parkes resigned.
20 October 1870	Writ of election issued by the Speaker of the Legislative Assembly and close of electoral rolls.
31 October 1870	Nominations
3 November 1870	Polling day
15 November 1870	Return of writ

== Results ==
1870 Kiama by-election Thursday 3 November
Candidate	Votes	%
Henry Parkes (re-elected)	472	58.0
Samuel Gray	342	42.0
Total formal votes	824	100.0
Informal votes	0	0.0
Turnout	824	67.7

== Aftermath ==
Parkes return to parliament was short lived as he was subsequently forced into bankruptcy in December 1870, forcing another by-election.

== See also ==
- Electoral results for the district of Kiama
- List of New South Wales state by-elections
