= 1887 Kiama colonial by-election =

By-election in New South Wales, Australia

A by-election was held for the New South Wales Legislative Assembly electorate of Kiama on 13 January 1887 because of the resignation of Harman Tarrant, due to the pressures of his professional practice as a surgeon.

== Dates ==
| Date | Event |
|---|---|
| 24 December 1886 | Harman Tarrant resigned. |
| 29 December 1886 | Writ of election issued by the Speaker of the Legislative Assembly. |
| 10 January 1887 | Nominations. |
| 13 January 1887 | Polling day |
| 20 January 1887 | Return of writ |
| 26 January 1887 | Parliament dissolved |

== Candidates ==
This by-election was at the emergence of political parties in New South Wales. Both candidates were supporters of free trade, with Sir Henry Parkes campaigning in support of Angus Cameron. Bruce Smith similarly supported free trade principles, but was of a more independent mind, stating at the nomination that he would not "follow blindly the lead of Sir Henry Parkes or that of any other gentleman".

== Results ==
1887 Kiama by-election Thursday 13 January
| Candidate | Votes | % |
|---|---|---|
| Angus Cameron (elected) | 673 | 64.3 |
| Bruce Smith | 373 | 35.7 |
| Total formal votes | 1,046 | 100.0 |
| Informal votes | 0 | 0.0 |
| Turnout | 1,046 | 64.5 |

== Aftermath ==
Cameron took his seat in the Legislative Assembly on 18 January, however his term was short-lived as Parliament was dissolved on 26 January. Cameron was re-elected unopposed at the election on 9 February as a Free Trade candidate.

== See also ==
- Electoral results for the district of Kiama
- List of New South Wales state by-elections
