= 1986 Kiama state by-election =

Election result for Kiama, New South Wales, Australia

A by-election was held for the New South Wales Legislative Assembly electorate of Kiama on 1 February 1986 because of the resignation of Labor Party member Bill Knott.

By-elections for the seats of Cabramatta and Canterbury were held on the same day.

== Dates ==
| Date | Event |
|---|---|
| 31 December 1985 | Bill Knott resigned. |
| 3 January 1986 | Writ of election issued by the Speaker of the Legislative Assembly and close of electoral rolls. |
| 9 January 1986 | Nominations |
| 1 February 1986 | Polling day |
| 21 February 1986 | Return of writ |

== Results ==
1986 Kiama by-election Saturday 1 February
| Party | Candidate | Votes | % | ±% |
|---|---|---|---|---|
| Labor | Bob Harrison | 16,702 | 51.8 | −6.9 |
| Liberal | Clyde Poulton | 10,300 | 32.0 | −9.3 |
| Independent | Janice Tanner | 1,655 | 5.1 | |
| Call to Australia | Louise Ollett | 1,603 | 5.0 | |
| Marijuana | Nicholas Brash | 1,268 | 3.9 | |
| Democrats | Valeria George | 702 | 2.2 | |
| Total formal votes | | 32,230 | 98.3 | |
| Informal votes | | 547 | 1.7 | |
| Turnout | | 32,777 | 86.2 | |
| Labor hold | | Swing | | |

== See also ==
- Electoral results for the district of Kiama
- List of New South Wales state by-elections
