= 1889 in Australian literature =

This article presents a list of the historical events and publications of Australian literature during 1889.

== Books ==
- Ada Cambridge – A Woman's Friendship
- Fergus Hume
  - The Girl from Malta
  - Lady Jezebel
- Hume Nisbet – Doctor Bernard St. Vincent : A Sensational Romance of Sydney
- Rosa Praed – The Romance of a Station
- Catherine Helen Spence – A Week in the Future

== Short stories ==
- Francis Adams
  - "Lily Davenant, Will Jeckyll's Version"
  - "Miss Jackson"
- Edward Dyson – "The Washerwoman of Jacker's Flat"
- Henry Lawson – "The Story of Malachi"
- A. B. Paterson – "Hughey's Dog : A Station Sketch"

== Poetry ==
- Edward Dyson – "The Worked-Out Mine"
- Henry Lawson
  - "The Ballad of the Drover"
  - "The Ghost"
  - "The Roaring Days"
  - "The Teams"
- Henry Parkes – Fragmentary Thoughts
- A. B. Paterson
  - "Clancy of the Overflow"
  - "How McGinness Went Missing"
  - "An Idyll of Dandaloo"

== Births ==
A list, ordered by date of birth (and, if the date is either unspecified or repeated, ordered alphabetically by surname) of births in 1889 of Australian literary figures, authors of written works or literature-related individuals follows, including year of death.

- 23 February – Vera Dwyer, novelist (died 1967)
- 3 June – Marnie Bassett, historian and biographer (died 1980)
- 29 August – Capel Boake, novelist (died 1944)
- 20 September – Ion Idriess, novelist (died 1979)
- 23 December — Doris Egerton Jones, novelist (died 1973)

== See also ==
- 1889 in Australia
- 1889 in literature
- 1889 in poetry
- List of years in Australian literature
- List of years in literature
