= 1871 Kiama colonial by-election =

By-election in New South Wales, Australia

A by-election was held for the New South Wales Legislative Assembly electorate of Kiama on 12 January 1871 because of the resignation of Henry Parkes. Parkes had resigned in October 1870 due to financial difficulties following the failure of his importing venture, but had been re-elected at the subsequent by-election. Barely one month later Parkes was forced into bankruptcy and had to resign again.

== Dates ==
Date	Event
3 November 1870	Parkes re-elected at the 1870 by-election.
9 December 1870	Parkes forced into bankruptcy and resigned.
10 December 1870	Writ of election issued by the Speaker of the Legislative Assembly and close of electoral rolls.
9 January 1871	Nominations at Kiama
12 January 1871	Polling day
31 January 1871	Return of writ

== Results ==
1871 Kiama by-election Thursday 12 January
Candidate	Votes	%
John Stewart	unopposed	

== See also ==
- Electoral results for the district of Kiama
- List of New South Wales state by-elections
