= 1886 in Australian literature =

This article presents a list of the historical events and publications of Australian literature during 1886.

== Books ==
- Mary Fortune — Dora Carleton : A Tale of Australia
- Fergus Hume — The Mystery of the Hansom Cab
- Rosa Praed
  - The Brother of the Shadow : A Mystery of To-Day
  - Miss Jacobsen's Chance : A Story of Australian Life
  - 'The Right Honourable' : A Romance of Society and Politics with Justin McCarthy

== Poetry ==
- Victor Daley
  - "Brunette"
  - "Poppies"
- John Farrell — "The Last Bullet"
- Henry Kendall — Poems of Henry Kendall
- Henry Parkes — "The Buried Chief"
- A. B. Paterson
  - "The Bushfire"
  - "A Dream of the Melbourne Cup : A Long Way after Gordon"
  - "The Mylora Elopement"
- Alice Werner – "Bannerman of Dandenong: An Australian Ballad"

== Short stories ==
- Marcus Clarke — "The Mind-Reader's Curse"
- Mary Fortune — "Bridget's Locket"

== Births ==
A list, ordered by date of birth (and, if the date is either unspecified or repeated, ordered alphabetically by surname) of births in 1886 of Australian literary figures, authors of written works or literature-related individuals follows, including year of death.

- 3 January — Arthur Mailey, cricketer and journalist (died 1967)
- 3 October – Duke Tritton, poet and folksinger (died 1965)
- 2 November — Albert Robert Blackmore, poet (died 1918)

== See also ==
- 1886 in Australia
- 1886 in literature
- 1886 in poetry
- List of years in Australian literature
- List of years in literature
