= 1880 Kiama colonial by-election =

By-election in New South Wales, Australia

A by-election was held for the New South Wales Legislative Assembly electorate of Kiama on 2 July 1880 because of the resignation of Samuel Charles ahead of a long trip to Britain.

== Dates ==
Date	Event
17 June 1880	Samuel Charles resigned.
18 June 1880	Writ of election issued by the Speaker of the Legislative Assembly.
30 June 1880	Nominations
2 July 1880	Polling day
13 July 1880	Return of writ

== Results ==
1880 Kiama by-election Friday 2 July
Candidate	Votes	%
Harman Tarrant (elected)	450	82.9
William Coulter	93	17.1
Total formal votes	543	100.0
Informal votes	0	0.0
Turnout	543	45.3

== See also ==
- Electoral results for the district of Kiama
- List of New South Wales state by-elections
