= Fragmentary Thoughts =

1889 poetry collection by Henry Parkes

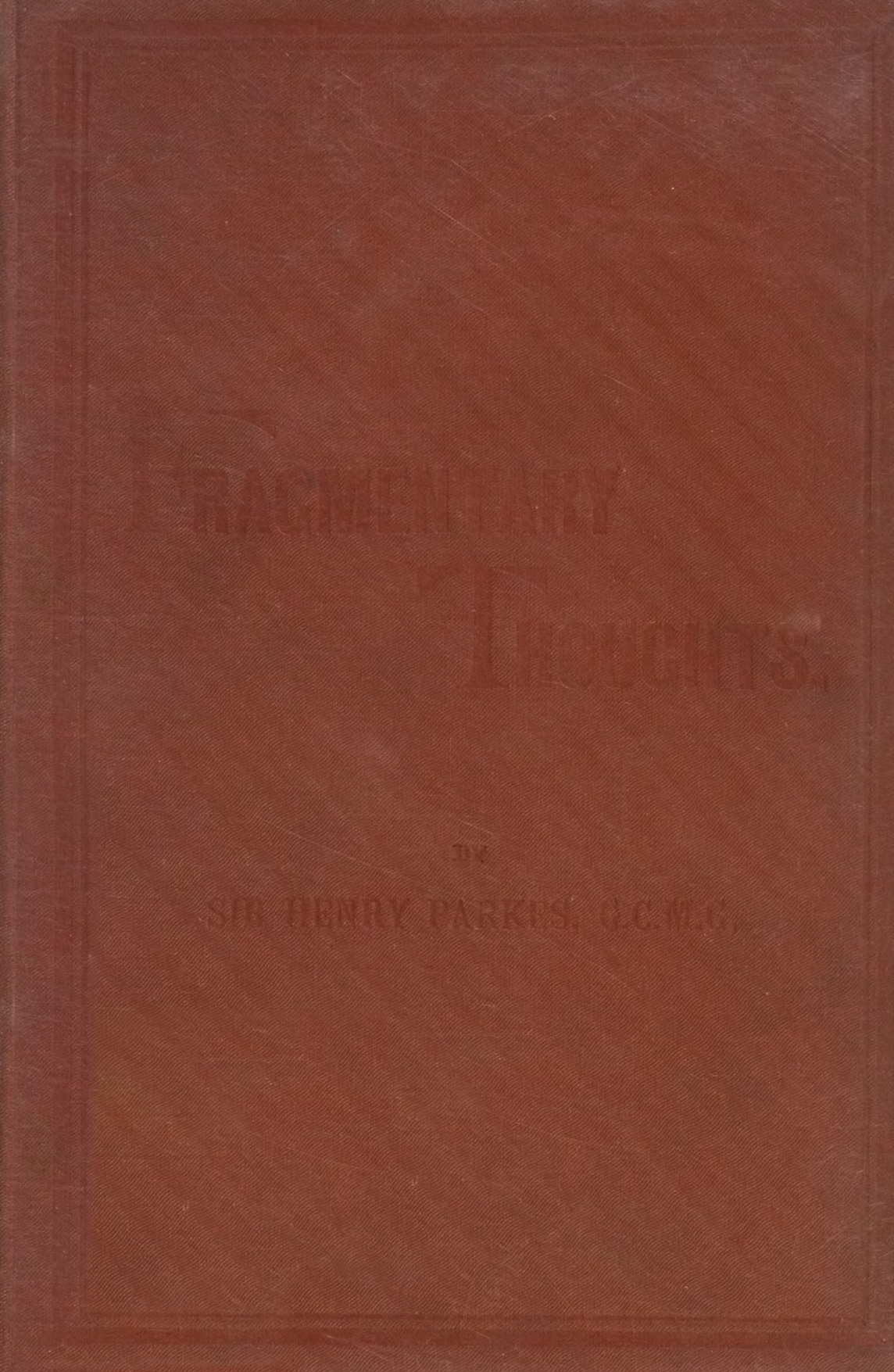
- Author: Henry Parkes
- Language: English
- Genre: Poetry collection
- Publisher: Samuel E. Lees
- Publication date: 1889
- Publication place: Australia
- Media type: Print
- Pages: 208 pp
- Preceded by: The Beauteous Terrorist and Other Poems
- Followed by: Sonnets and Other Verses

Fragmentary Thoughts is a poetry collection by Australian poet, politician and writer Henry Parkes, published by Samuel E. Lees, in 1889.

The first edition contains 73 poems which had all been published previously.

== Dedication ==
- Dedication: "To Lord Tennyson. Permit me to dedicate this volume to you in remembrance of golden hours of life spent with you in various ways. Our happy walks together in the groves and over the downs in the neighbourhood of Farringford, and through the bowery lanes and across the green fields around Aldworth; the hours of rare enjoyment vouchsafed to me when, under your honoured roof, I have listened to your reading of your immortal poems; the delicate kindnesses extended to me by the gracious lady who, for so many years, has made the spiritual sunshine of your illustrious life-all remain with me as memories whose beauty can never die. Henry Parkes. Sydney, December, 1889."

== Contents ==
Contents:

- "Fatherland"
- "A Passing Rhyme"
- "Suggested by Political Changes in Men in Power and Men Out of Power in 1856"
- "The New Parliament"
- "On the Receipt of the Last Intelligence from France"
- "Lamartine"
- "Sunrise, from Bourke's Statue"
- "The Buried Chief"
- "To A Beautiful Friendless Child"
- "Charles and Oliver"
- "A League Hymn"
- "Our Coming Countrymen"
- "The Multitude's Hymn"
- "Labour, Wisdom, Unity"
- "Sunrise"
- "The Strength of Life"
- "A Common Grief"
- "The Emigrant to His Wife"
- "Life"
- "The Home-Bound Ship"
- "A Picture of Love"
- "The Maniac to His Lady-Love"
- "On Reading Mrs Norton's Dream"
- "Love's Home"
- "The Murdered Wild Boy : An Old Settler's Story"
- "I Remember"
- "The Beauteous Terrorist"
- "The Silver Wedding Day"
- "Bounding O'er the Summer Sea"
- "Trust"
- "Bismarck"
- "Seventy"
- "Solitude"
- "To Inez"
- "The Daughter of Toil"
- "The Cry of "Land!""
- "The Australian Flag (The Flag)"
- "Stella"
- "Brougham"
- "The Martyr Tree"
- "Lays of Love and Longing (To Arabella G., of Sacramento)"
- "Homeward in the Tropics"
- "Life on the Mountains"
- "Minnie"
- "A Mother's Grief"
- "The Mountain Grave"
- "Nellie"
- "The Strong Man"
- "To a Wilful Child"
- "At Sea"
- "The Patriot"
- "Gone!"
- "Ragged Jane"
- "The Wanderers"
- "To Clarinda (To * * *)"
- "Blighted Love"
- "The Voice of Sin"
- "Stanza to the Queen"
- "An English Scene"
- "Song"
- "The Old Pocket Book"
- "The First Night at Sea"
- "Life's Early Joys"
- "Song of the Australian Settler (The Settler's Song)"
- "The Sea-Boy"
- "Unhappy Love"
- "Fragment"
- "A Ploughman's Tale"
- "My Native Land"
- "Song"
- "'Gone Over to the Majority'"
- "Fragment of a Picture"
- "The Emigrant's Farewell"

== Critical reception ==
A reviewer in The Evening News (Sydney) was rather ambivalent: The 'thoughts' belong to various and far-removed periods of the Premier's career. Some of them are the result of very recent laborings of his muse; others date back to between fifty and sixty years ago. The special interest claimed for them in the preface is that they reveal something of the inner life and higher aspirations of their author, while, at the same time, shedding additional light on his character as a public man. It would, perhaps, be ungracious to hint that, whatever may be their value as contributions to the general stock of knowledge respecting our foremost politician, they leave a good deal to be desired on the score of poetry."

== Publication history ==
After the initial publication of the collection by Samuel E. Lees in 1889, it has not been reprinted.

== See also ==
- 1889 in Australian literature
