= The Ballad of the Drover =

1889 poem by Australian writer Henry Lawson

- by Henry Lawson
- Written: February 1889
- First published in: The Australian Town and Country Journal
- Country: Australia
- Language: English
- Publication date: 9 March 1889
- Lines: 88

Full text
- The Ballad of the Drover at Wikisource

"The Ballad of the Drover" (1889) is a poem by Australian poet Henry Lawson.

It was originally published in The Australian Town and Country Journal on 9 March 1889 and subsequently reprinted in several of the author's collections, other periodicals and a number of Australian poetry anthologies.

== Critical reception ==
A reviewer on the PoetryVerse website noted that the poem initially "exudes optimism and anticipation, painting a picture of a joyful reunion." But that ultimately "the poem serves as a tragic reminder of the harsh realities faced by those who lived and worked in the Australian outback."

== Publication history ==
After the poem's initial publication in The Australian Town and Country Journal it was reprinted as follows:

- The Australian Town and Country Journal, 21 September 1889
- In the Days When the World was Wide and Other Verses by Henry Lawson, Angus and Robertson, 1900
- The Coo-ee Reciter : Humorous, Pathetic, Dramatic, Dialect, Recitations and Readings compiled by W.T. Pyke, Ward, Lock, 1904
- The Children's Treasury of Australian Verse edited by Bertram Stevens and George Mackaness, Angus and Robertson, 1913
- Selected Poems of Henry Lawson by Henry Lawson, Angus and Robertson, 1918
- Winnowed Verse by Henry Lawson, Angus and Robertson, 1924
- Selections from Australian Poets edited by Bertram Stephens and George Mackaness, Cornstalk Publishing, 1925
- Poets of Australia : An Anthology of Australian Verse edited by George Mackaness, Angus & Robertson, 1946
- The Children's Lawson edited by Colin Roderick, Angus and Robertson, 1949
- An Anthology of Australian Verse edited by George Mackaness, Angus & Robertson, 1952
- Songs from Lawson edited by John Meredith, Bush Music Club, 1956
- From the Ballads to Brennan edited by T. Inglis Moore, Angus & Robertson, 1964
- Poems of Henry Lawson edited by Walter Stone, Ure Smith, 1973
- The World of Henry Lawson edited by Walter Stone, Hamlyn, 1974
- A Treasury of Colonial Poetry, Currawong, 1982
- A Campfire Yarn : Henry Lawson Complete Works 1885-1900 edited by Leonard Cronin, Lansdowne, 1984
- The Illustrated Treasury of Australian Verse edited by Beatrice Davis, Nelson, 1984
- Cross-Country : A Book of Australian Verse edited by John Barnes and Brian MacFarlane, Heinemann, 1984
- Henry Lawson : An Illustrated Treasury edited by Glenys Smith, Lansdowne, 1985
- Favourite Australian Poems, Child and Associates, 1987
- A Collection of Australian Bush Verse, Peter Antill-Rose, 1989
- Australian Bush Poems, Axiom, 1991
- A Treasury of Bush Verse edited by G. A. Wilkes, Angus and Robertson, 1991
- Classic Australian Verse edited by Maggie Pinkney, Five Mile Press, 2001
- Henry Lawson edited by Geoffrey Blainey, Text Publishing, 2002
- An Australian Treasury of Popular Verse edited by Jim Haynes, ABC Books, 2002
- Two Centuries of Australian Poetry edited by Kathrine Bell, Gary Allen, 2007
- Australian Poetry Since 1788 edited by Geoffrey Lehmann and Robert Gray, University of NSW Press, 2011

== Notes ==
- The original publication of the poem in The Australian Town and Country Journal was mis-printed. In the third line of the fourth verse the word "twinkles" should have been printed as "trickles". This was corrected when the poem was re-printed in the Journal in September 1889.

== See also ==
- 1889 in Australian literature
- 1889 in poetry
