= The Roaring Days =

1889 poem by Henry Lawson

- by Henry Lawson
- Written: 1889
- First published in: The Bulletin
- Country: Australia
- Language: English
- Publication date: 21 December 1889

Full text
- The Roaring Days at Wikisource

"The Roaring Days" (1889) is a poem by Australian poet Henry Lawson.

It was originally published in The Bulletin on 21 December 1889, and subsequently reprinted in a collection of the author's poems, other newspapers and periodicals and a number of Australian poetry anthologies.

== Critical reception ==
When reviewing Lawson's poetry collection In the Days when the World was Wide and Other Verses, a writer in The Evening News (Sydney) noted: "Mr. Lawson is not, indeed, likely to be ever revealed in the character of a master singer, but so far as he goes he is really a minstrel of native fire, and not like a good many who pretend to that character, a merely ingenious imitator or adaptor of other people's ideas."

The Oxford Companion to Australian Literature states that "The Roaring Days" is "a phrase referring nostalgically to the gold rushes. Its best-known literary use is in Henry Lawson's poem, 'The Roaring Days', written from Lawson's boyhood memories of Gulgong and Pipeclay."

== Publication history ==
After the poem's initial publication in The Bulletin it was reprinted as follows:

- In the Days When the World was Wide and Other Verses, 1900
- Selected Poems of Henry Lawson by Henry Lawson, Angus and Robertson, 1918
- Winnowed Verse by Henry Lawson, Angus and Robertson, 1924
- Selections from Australian Poets edited by Bertram Stephens and George Mackaness, Cornstalk Publishing, 1925
- Australian Bush Songs and Ballads edited by Will Lawson, Frank Johnson, 1944
- An Anthology of Australian Verse edited by George Mackaness, Angus & Robertson, 1952
- A Book of Australian Verse edited by Judith Wright, Oxford University Press, 1956
- New Land, New Language : An Anthology of Australian Verse edited by Judith Wright, Oxford University Press, 1957
- Favourite Australian Poems edited by Ian Mudie, Rigby, 1963
- Silence Into Song : An Anthology of Australian Verse edited by Clifford O'Brien, Rigby, 1968
- Australian Kaleidoscope edited by Barbara Ker Wilson, Collins, 1968
- This Land : An Anthology of Australian Poetry for Young People edited by M. M. Flynn and J. Groom, Pergamon Press, 1968
- Poems of Henry Lawson edited by Walter Stone, Ure Smith, 1973
- The World of Henry Lawson edited by Walter Stone, Hamlyn, 1974
- The Essential Henry Lawson : The Best Works of Australia's Greatest Writer edited Brian Kiernan, Currey O'Neil, 1982
- A Campfire Yarn : Henry Lawson Complete Works 1885-1900 edited by Leonard Cronin, Lansdowne, 1984
- Cross-Country : A Book of Australian Verse edited by John Barnes and Brian MacFarlane, Heinemann, 1984
- The Penguin Book of Australian Ballads edited by Elizabeth Webby and Philip Butterss, Penguin, 1993
- Classic Australian Verse edited by Maggie Pinkney, Five Mile Press, 2001
- Australian Poetry Since 1788 edited by Geoffrey Lehmann and Robert Gray, University of NSW Press, 2011

== See also ==
- 1889 in Australian literature
- 1889 in poetry
