= The Buried Chief =

Poem by Australian writer Henry Parkes

- by Henry Parkes
- Written: 1886
- First published in: The Sydney Morning Herald
- Country: Australia
- Language: English

Full text
- The Buried Chief at Wikisource

"The Buried Chief" (1886) is a poem by Australian poet Henry Parkes.

The poem was written by Henry Parkes, on 6 November 1886, after the death of Sir James Martin — three times Premier of New South Wales, and Chief Justice of New South Wales from 1873 to 1886 — on 4 November.

It was originally published in The Sydney Morning Herald on 24 November 1886 and subsequently reprinted in Fragmentary Thoughts by the author and a number of Australian poetry anthologies.

== Critical reception ==
In reviewing the author's poetry collection, Fragmentary Thoughts, a reviewer in The Sydney Morning Herald noted that the poem had "something of that fine-pitched and measured dignity that has won for Sir Henry Parkes many a hard-fought battle in the long days of his career in this land. It, with a dozen others, would make a small volume which men of thought—whether his political enemies or his friends—would regard with pleasure and keep with pride."

== Publication history ==
After the poem's initial publication in The Sydney Morning Herald it was reprinted as follows:

- Fragmentary Thoughts by Henry Parkes, Samuel E. Lees, 1889
- An Anthology of Australian Verse edited by Bertram Stevens, Angus and Robertson, 1907
- The Golden Treasury of Australian Verse edited by Bertram Stevens, Angus and Robertson, 1909
- A Treasury of Colonial Poetry, Currawong, 1982

== See also ==
- 1886 in Australian literature
- 1886 in poetry
