= Vera Dwyer =

Australian writer

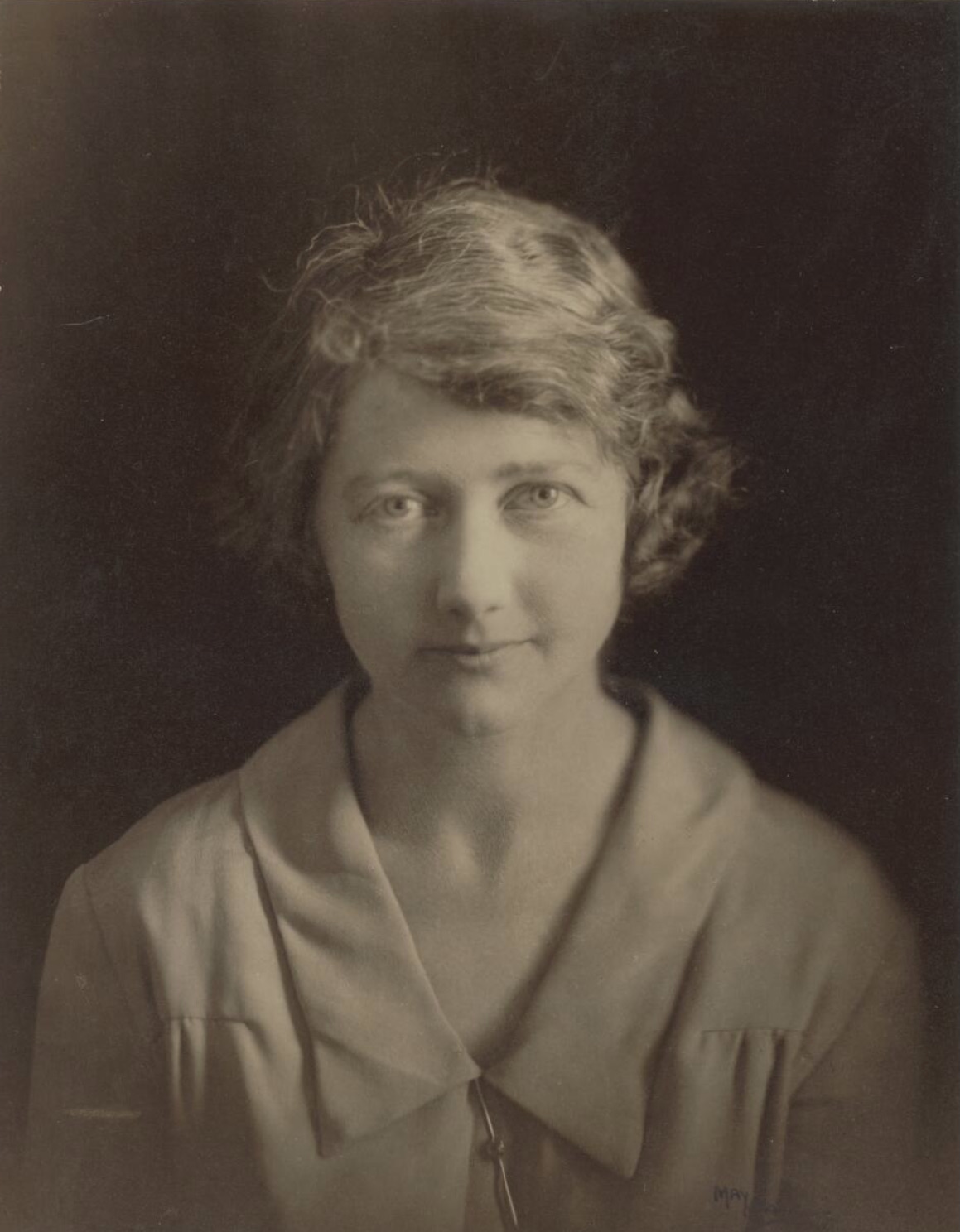
- Born: Vera Gladys Dwyer; 23 February 1889 Hobart, Tasmania, Australia
- Died: 10 September 1967 (aged 78) St Leonards, New South Wales, Australia
- Occupation: Novelist; short story writer
- Period: 1898–1943
- Notable works: With Beating Wings

Vera Gladys Dwyer (23 February 1889 – 10 September 1967) was an Australian novelist. She also contributed stories to magazines and newspapers.

== Life ==
Dwyer was born in Hobart on 23 February 1889, the second daughter of reporter, George Lovell Dwyer and Margaret Jane (née Shield). Her older sister, Ella Maggie Dwyer (9 March 1887 – 6 September 1979), became a printmaker who also designed bookplates. She was educated at Friends School in Hobart, but when the family moved to Sydney by 1902 where her father joined the Evening News she was taught by governesses.

At age nine, she wrote to "Aunt Mary", editor of the Children's Column in the Perth weekly, the Western Mail, sharing a very short story called "The Clock". The following year she began writing to "Dame Durden" (Ethel Turner), who in December 1899 accepted her story "Earwigs and Apricots" for publication in Australian Town and Country Journal. She became a regular contributor to Australian Town and Country Journal and to the Sydney Mail and New South Wales Advertiser.

In 1913 Dwyer's first book, With Beating Wings, was published by Ward, Lock & Co., as one of "their favourite Australian Gift Books, uniform with the works of Ethel Turner, Lilian Turner and Mary Grant Bruce". The reviewer for the Adelaide Mail wrote "Vera G. Dwyer can write a really good story, and if this is her first book we shall look with interest for further work from her pen".

Immediately following the outbreak of World War I, Dwyer wrote "Arms and the Girl", a patriotic story which was sold to raise money for the Patriotic Fund. Her third book, A War of Girls, was described by the new book reviewer for The Age as having "a beautiful simplicity and naturalness about this sparkling tale of the school and the home".

She married Lt. Warwick Coldham Fussell in on 26 October 1915, just three weeks before he left Australia to serve overseas. They divorced in 1925.

Her fourth novel, Conquering Hall, was not so favourably received. The Sun used "Vera Dwyer Fails" as a subheading, while the Newcastle Morning Herald wrote that it was "not a novel that one can conscientiously make a pleasant fuss about".

Dwyer died in Roseville on 10 September 1967.

== Selected works ==
- With Beating Wings, 1913
- Mona's Mystery Man, 1914
- A War of Girls, 1915
- Conquering Hall, 1916
- The Kayles of Bushy Lodge, 1922
- The Marches Disappear, 1929
- House of Conflict, 1933
- In Pursuit of Patrick, 1933
- The Stolen Ghost, 1943 (republished in 1947 as The Banished Lovers)
