= Gareth Ward =

Australian politician (born 1981)

- Ward in 2018
- Born: 1980 or 1981 (age 44–45); Port Kembla, New South Wales, Australia
- Status: Sentenced to prison
- Conviction: Guilty on all counts
- Criminal charges: Indecent assault (3 counts); Sexual intercourse without consent (1 count)
- Trial: Downing Centre (27 May 2025 – 25 July 2025)
- Penalty: 5.75 years (3.75 years before parole)

Details
- Victims: Political staffer and acquaintance
- Date apprehended: 27 March 2022
- Imprisoned at: Cooma Correctional Centre

Member of the New South Wales Parliament for Kiama
- In office 26 March 2011 – 8 August 2025
- Preceded by: Matt Brown
- Succeeded by: Katelin McInerney

Minister for Families, Communities and Disability Services
- In office 2 April 2019 – 14 May 2021
- Preceded by: Pru Goward (as Minister for Family and Community Services); Ray Williams (as Minister for Disability Services)
- Succeeded by: Alister Henskens

Personal details
- Party: Liberal (until 2021); Independent (from 2021)
- Education: Bomaderry High School
- Alma mater: University of Wollongong (BCom, BA); University of New England (LLB); University of Sydney (LLM); Australian National University
- Occupation: Lawyer; Politician
- Website: www.garethwardmp.com.au Archived 20 July 2025 at the Wayback Machine

Gareth James Ward is an Australian former politician and convicted criminal. Ward resigned from parliament in 2025 following a conviction for sexual assault. He was a member of the New South Wales Legislative Assembly and represented the seat of Kiama on the South Coast from 2011 to 2025, serving as New South Wales Minister for Families, Communities and Disability Services in the second Berejiklian ministry from 2019 to 2021.

He was suspended from the New South Wales parliament in March 2022 until the end of his term in March 2023, after being charged with sexual intercourse without consent, and three counts of indecent assault. He was convicted of all four counts in July 2025. Ward resigned from parliament on 8 August 2025 shortly before a vote on his expulsion from parliament following the guilty verdict in his trial. This triggered a by-election in Kiama. He was sentenced to five years and nine months in prison.

== Early life ==
Ward was born c. 1981 in the Illawarra region and completed his schooling at Bomaderry High School. Ward was born with albinism and is legally blind. He holds degrees in commerce and arts from the University of Wollongong and Bachelor of Laws from the University of New England, and a Master of Laws from the University of Sydney. He holds a Graduate Diploma in Legal Practice from the Australian National University, and is an Admitted Solicitor in the Supreme Court of NSW and the High Court of Australia. From 2001 to 2006, Ward was on the Council of the Wollongong Undergraduate Students' Association at the university, and was involved with the Australian Liberal Students Federation.

== Political career ==
=== Local government ===
On 27 March 2004, Ward was elected to the Shoalhaven City Council as an independent councillor representing the northern parts of Shoalhaven. He was re-elected on 13 September 2008 and became deputy mayor in the same month. Ward was a councillor on Shoalhaven City Council from 2004 until 2012.

=== Liberal MP ===
On 12 April 2010, Ward was preselected as the Liberal candidate for Kiama. It was reported that he gained preselection in a 20–12 vote against the previous candidate, Ann Sudmalis. At the 2011 state election, Ward was elected with a swing of 19.4 points and won the seat with 57.5 per cent of the vote on a two-party basis. Ward's main opponent was the incumbent sitting Labor member and former Minister, Matt Brown.

In April 2015, Ward was appointed as Parliamentary Secretary for the Illawarra and South Coast after Premier Mike Baird abolished the former position of Minister for the Illawarra. In March 2017, Ward was appointed as the Parliamentary Secretary for Education. Ward retained his existing responsibilities as the Parliamentary Secretary for the Illawarra and South Coast. Ward served as Parliamentary Secretary for Education, in addition to his role as the Parliamentary Secretary for the Illawarra and South Coast from 2017 until 2019.

In September 2017 Ward claimed to have been the target of an attempted mugging in New York City while staying at the Intercontinental Hotel. Ward claimed to have booked a male masseur for a massage, which was reported as a "special massage". In conflicting reports, it was claimed he "called a phone number provided by an acquaintance", but others maintained that he ordered "the massage online from an outside service". When two men turned up and announced that both of them were minors, Ward told them to leave. He then claimed the duo became aggressive and demanded US$1000 before they would leave. While luring the men down to the lobby under the guise of retrieving money from an ATM, Ward alerted hotel staff and the men fled. CCTV images were circulated but no arrests have been made.

In September 2018, Ward was described in federal parliament by his fellow Liberal colleague, Ann Sudmalis, as leading a campaign of "bullying, betrayal and backstabbing" against her while she was a representative. The allegations were expanded to include branch stacking of local Liberal branches, and installing people hostile to Sudmalis on her electoral committee. She described his determination as to "annihilate anyone who opposed him" with his motivation being "Gareth's narcissistic revenge". Sudmalis went on to accuse him of misogynistic behaviour and raised several examples of where he had actively opposed and campaigned against female Liberals on the South Coast.

Following the 2019 state election Ward was appointed as Minister for Families, Communities and Disability Services in the Second Berejiklian ministry.

=== Independent ===
In February 2023 he announced that he would be contesting his seat as an independent at the 2023 state election, "to stand up for the principles and values that are worth fighting for".

Ward was narrowly elected as an independent in the 2023 New South Wales state election, suffering a 10.7% swing against him. The NSW government decided to follow the advice of parliament's privileges and ethics committee not to extend Ward's suspension into his new term.

In July 2024, Ward arrived at Parliament House at 4 am to retrieve his spare house keys after locking himself out of his apartment at Potts Point. He denied being drunk or wearing only underwear. Premier Chris Minns asked for a full explanation.

On 5 August 2025, Ward was granted an injunction that prevented the New South Wales Parliament from trying to expel him from the Legislative Assembly. The injunction order was revoked following an appeal by the state government.

On 8 August 2025, shortly before an expulsion vote in the Legislative Assembly, Ward resigned from his position as member for Kiama, triggering a by-election for the seat.

== Sexual abuse charges ==
On 14 May 2021 Ward resigned from his portfolio and moved to the crossbench after identifying himself as the state MP subject to an inquiry by the child abuse and sex crimes squad of the New South Wales Police Force. Ward has denied the allegations.

On 22 March 2022 Ward was charged with three counts of indecent assault, one count of sexual intercourse without consent, and one alternate charge of common assault. He allegedly indecently assaulted an 18-year-old man at Meroo Meadow in February 2013 and sexually abused a 24-year-old man in Sydney in September 2015. Ward was granted conditional bail to appear at Port Kembla Local Court on 18 May. The then-NSW Premier, Dominic Perrottet, called for his resignation from Parliament and said that if Ward did not resign, the government would move a motion to remove him from parliament. On 24 March 2022, Ward was suspended from parliament after a motion to do so was passed unanimously in the Legislative Assembly. On 19 August 2022, Ward was committed to stand trial for sexual and indecent assault.

=== Trial ===
Ward's trial commenced in the Downing Centre District Court on 27 May 2025 before Judge Kara Shead. Ward pleaded not guilty to the three charges against him. On 25 July, Ward was found guilty of sexually abusing two men after a nine-week trial.

On 31 July, Ward filed defamation proceedings in the NSW District Court against radio station 2SM over comments made by broadcaster John Laws prior to his criminal trial.

On 31 October 2025, Ward was sentenced to five years and nine months in prison, with a non-parole sentence of three years and nine months.

New South Wales Legislative Assembly
Preceded by Matt Brown	Member for Kiama; 2011–2025	Succeeded by Katelin McInerney
Political offices
Preceded by Pru Goward as Minister for Family and Community Services	Minister for Families, Communities and Disability Services; 2019–2021	Succeeded by Alister Henskens
Preceded by Ray Williams as Minister for Disability Services	Minister for Families, Communities and Disability Services; 2019–2021	Succeeded by Alister Henskens
