= Samuel Charles (politician) =

Irish-born Australian politician

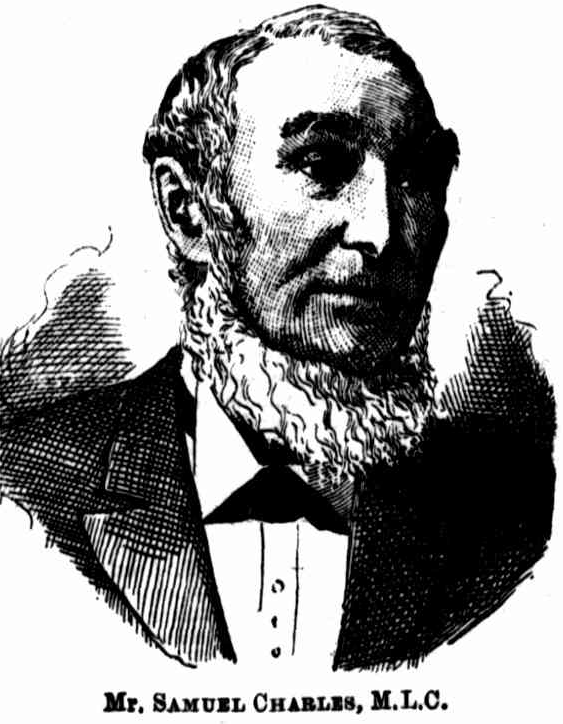

Member of the New South Wales Legislative Assembly for Kiama
- In office 27 January 1875 – 17 June 1880

Member of the New South Wales Legislative Council
- In office 1885 – 23 September 1909

Personal details
- Born: 1818 Ballyronan, County Londonderry, Ireland
- Died: 23 September 1909 (aged 90–91) Point Piper, New South Wales, Australia
- Spouse: Sarah Ann Gray (m. 1855)
- Parent(s): Richard Charles; Margaret Hull

Samuel Charles (1818 – 23 September 1909) was an Irish-born Australian politician.

He was born at Ballyronan in County Londonderry to sergeant-major Richard Charles and Margaret Hull. He worked as a shipwright at Belfast and in 1844 migrated to Sydney, where he worked on coastal waters until 1846 when he acquired his own brigantine for the Pacific trade. In 1849 he visited the United States, where he was exporting coal; he also travelled to the United Kingdom to acquire an extra steamer. On 30 May 1855 he married Sarah Ann Gray, the sister of Samuel Gray, at Gerringong; they had eight children. He acquired a farm at Kiama, where he was an alderman from 1868 to 1870. In 1874 he was elected to the New South Wales Legislative Assembly for Kiama, serving until he resigned to travel overseas in 1880. In 1885 he was appointed to the New South Wales Legislative Council, where he remained until his death in Point Piper on 23 September 1909.

His nephews John Marks and James Marks also served in the colonial parliament.

New South Wales Legislative Assembly
Preceded by John Stewart	Member for Kiama; 1874–1880	Succeeded by Harman Tarrant
