= Matt Brown (Australian politician) =

Australian politician

The Honorable Matt Brown MP

Minister for Police Minister for the Illawarra
- In office 8 September 2008 – 11 September 2008
- Preceded by: David Campbell

Member for Kiama
- In office 27 March 1999 – 23 March 2011
- Preceded by: Bob Harrison
- Succeeded by: Gareth Ward

Personal details
- Born: 10 March 1972 (age 54)
- Party: Labor Party; We Love Kiama Gerringong Jamberoo
- Profession: Solicitor; Academic

Matthew James Brown (born 10 March 1972) is an Australian politician, elected as a member of the New South Wales Legislative Assembly for Kiama between 1999 and 2011. He was appointed Minister for Police and Minister for the Illawarra in the New South Wales Government on 8 September 2008 but resigned three days later after allegations of inappropriate conduct at a party in Parliament House occurring in June 2008.

Brown holds a Bachelor of Mathematics and a Bachelor of Laws from the University of Wollongong. Prior to his election he worked as solicitor and as a lecturer at the university.

== Political career ==
Brown was elected as Member for Kiama in 1999, representing the Labor Party. He was sworn in as Minister for Housing and Tourism on 2 April 2007, and promoted to Minister for Police and Minister for the Illawarra on 8 September 2008. He resigned on 11 September 2008 after being accused of erotic dancing at a late-night party in his Parliament House office. In 2010, he denied these allegations.

Partly due to the fallout from those allegations, Brown was heavily defeated at the 2011 state election by Liberal challenger Gareth Ward, suffering a swing of over 19 percent.

Brown had been suggested to run for the Federal seat of Throsby at the 2013 election but he decided against it.

Brown ran as a candidate for Kiama Council in the 2016 NSW Council Elections. He was elected to council along with his second running mate, Don Watson.

New South Wales Legislative Assembly
Preceded by Bob Harrison	Member for Kiama; 1999–2011	Succeeded by Gareth Ward
Political offices
Preceded by Sandra Nori as Minister for Tourism, Sport and Recreation	Minister for Tourism; 2007–2008	Succeeded by Jodi McKay
