= Katelin McInerney =

Australian politician

Katelin McInerney MP

Member of the New South Wales Legislative Assembly for Kiama
- Incumbent
- Assumed office 13 September 2025
- Preceded by: Gareth Ward

Personal details
- Party: Labor
- Occupation: Journalist

Katelin McInerney is an Australian politician who was elected to the New South Wales Legislative Assembly in the 2025 Kiama state by-election on 13 September 2025. She previously contested the seat at the 2023 New South Wales state election, but was unsuccessful. She is the first female MP for the seat.

McInerney is a former journalist and trade union leader.
