= 2025 Kiama state by-election =

Election in New South Wales, Australia

- 13 September 2025

Electoral district of Kiama in the New South Wales Legislative Assembly
- Registered: 62,486
- Turnout: 51,890 (89.82%)

	First party	Second party	Third party
			IND
Candidate	Katelin McInerney	Serena Copley	Kate Dezarnaulds
Party	Labor	Liberal	Independent
Primary vote	18,622	13,226	5,225
Percentage	37.32%	26.51%	10.47%
Swing	▲2.93%	▲14.48%	▲10.47
TPP	60.19%	39.81%
TPP swing	▼9.54%	▲9.54%
MP before election
Gareth Ward
Independent
Elected MP
Katelin McInerney
Labor

A by-election in the New South Wales electoral district of Kiama was held on 13 September 2025, following the resignation of independent MP Gareth Ward.

Ward was found guilty on 25 July 2025 of sexually abusing two men. He was scheduled to be expelled from parliament on 8 August 2025, but resigned the same day.

Thirteen candidates stood in the 2025 Kiama state by-election. Labor candidate Katelin McInerney was projected to have won the by-election at 7:45 pm AEST on election night.

== Background ==
=== Resignation of previous MP ===
The previous member for Kiama, Gareth Ward, a former Liberal Party Minister turned independent MP, was convicted on charges of sexually abusing two young men. Ward resigned shortly before a vote to expel him was to be proposed by the government in the Legislative Assembly.

=== Previous results ===
2023 New South Wales state election: Kiama
Party	Candidate	Votes	%	±%
Independent	Gareth Ward	20,316	38.79	+38.79
Labor	Katelin McInerney	18,010	34.39	+6.19
Liberal	Melanie Gibbons	6,301	12.03	−41.56
Greens	Tonia Gray	5,833	11.14	−0.74
Sustainable Australia	John Gill	1,911	3.65	+0.73
Total formal votes		52,371	96.90	+0.07
Informal votes		1,678	3.10	−0.07
Turnout		54,049	89.82	−1.28
Notional two-party-preferred count
Labor	Katelin McInerney	24,564	69.73	+31.74
Liberal	Melanie Gibbons	10,665	30.27	−31.74
Two-candidate-preferred result
Independent	Gareth Ward	23,018	50.76	+50.76
Labor	Katelin McInerney	22,329	49.24	+11.25
Member changed to Independent from Liberal				

== Key dates ==
Some important dates for this by-election included:

- 14 August 2025 — Postal vote applications opened
- 22 August 2025 — The writ was issued
- 22 August 2025 — Electoral rolls closed
- 22 August 2025 — Candidate nominations opened
- 28 August 2025 — Candidate nominations closed
- 29 August 2025 — Candidates were announced
- 6 September 2025 — Early voting commenced
- 6 September 2025 — Telephone-assisted voting opened
- 12 September 2025 — Early voting closed
- 12 September 2025 — Telephone-assisted voting applications closed
- 13 September 2025 — Election day from 8 am to 6 pm
- 13 September 2025 — Telephone-assisted voting closed
- 30 September 2025 — Distribution of preferences
- 1 October 2025 — Results are declared
- 3–21 October 2025 — Return of writ

== Candidates ==
13 candidates stood in the election. The table below shows candidates according to the NSW Electoral Commission, listed in the order they appeared on the ballot.

Party	Candidate	Background
Greens	Tonia Gray	Former City of Shoalhaven councillor and candidate for Kiama in 2023
Liberal	Serena Copley	Trainer and former City of Shoalhaven councillor
Independent	Andrew Thaler	Snowy Monaro Regional councillor and perennial candidate.
Independent	Roger Woodward	Accountant and candidate for Berowra in the 2025 federal election and Hornsby in 2024
Legalise Cannabis	Don Fuggle	Activist
Sustainable Australia	Ken Davis	Mental health professional
Independent	Lisa Cotton	Community advocate
Independent	Cyrille Jeufo Keuheu	IT developer
Shooters, Fishers, Farmers	Felix Nelson	Land manager and Army veteran
Libertarian	Joshua Beer	Liberal candidate for Lake Macquarie in 2023
Animal Justice	Ellie Robertson	Perennial candidate
Independent	Kate Dezarnaulds	Small business owner and candidate for Gilmore in the 2025 federal election
Labor	Katelin McInerney	Journalist and candidate for Kiama in 2023

Family First intended to stand Kyle Napoleoni as the party's candidate, but his nomination was disqualified for not meeting NSW Electoral Commission requirements.

== Results ==
2025 Kiama state by-election
Party	Candidate	Votes	%	±%
Labor	Katelin McInerney	18,622	37.32	+2.93
Liberal	Serena Copley	13,226	26.51	+14.48
Independent	Kate Dezarnaulds	5,225	10.47	+10.47
Greens	Tonia Gray	4,074	8.17	–2.97
Legalise Cannabis	Don Fuggle	2,550	5.11	+5.11
Shooters, Fishers, Farmers	Felix Nelson	2,543	5.10	+5.10
Libertarian	Joshua Beer	895	1.79	+1.79
Independent	Lisa Cotton	676	1.35	+1.35
Animal Justice	Ellie Robertson	622	1.25	+1.25
Independent	Andrew Thaler	544	1.09	+1.09
Independent	Roger Woodward	429	0.86	+0.86
Sustainable Australia	Ken Davis	420	0.84	–2.81
Independent	Cyrille Jeufo Keuheu	69	0.14	+0.14
Total formal votes		49,895	96.16	−0.74
Informal votes		1,995	3.84	+0.74
Turnout		51,890	83.04	−6.78
Two-party-preferred result
Labor	Katelin McInerney	23,313	60.19	–9.54
Liberal	Serena Copley	15,421	39.81	+9.54
Labor gain from Independent		Swing	–9.54	
