= Bill Knott (politician) =

Australian politician (1921–2013)

Member of the New South Wales Legislative Assembly for Kiama
- In office 19 September 1981 – 31 December 1986
- Preceded by: District created
- Succeeded by: Bob Harrison

Member of the New South Wales Legislative Assembly for Wollondilly
- In office 7 October 1978 – 28 August 1981
- Preceded by: Tom Lewis
- Succeeded by: District abolished

Personal details
- Born: William Edwin Knott; 16 February 1921 Sydney, New South Wales
- Died: 19 April 2013 (aged 92) Port Macquarie, New South Wales
- Party: Labor Party
- Spouse: Marie Griffin
- Children: Peter Knott
- Occupation: Electrician

William Edwin Knott (16 February 1921 – 19 April 2013) was an Australian politician, elected as a member of the New South Wales Legislative Assembly.

He was born in Sydney, New South Wales and educated at St Mary's College, Sydney and Christian Brothers College, Strathfield and Ultimo Technical College. He was apprenticed to the New South Wales Government Railways as an electrician. He worked for five years as an interstate transport contractor.

In October 1949 he married Marie and they had three children, Judith, Michael and Peter. Peter Knott would go on to become a Labor member of the federal House of Representatives from 1993 to 1996.

He was a member of Electrical Trades Union of Australia for 42 years. He was an alderman of Condobolin Shire (now part of Lachlan Shire) and on the board of the Mid-Lachlan County Council from 1952 to 1961. He spent three years on the Kiama Council and the Illawarra County Council from 1976 to 1979. He assisted in the establishment of the Mission Council Housing Scheme and low interest aboriginal housing loans. He was an honorary member of the Yuin people of Wallaga Lake Aborigines and claimed to have been awarded a burial site at Wallaga Lake by tribal elders.

He joined the Labor Party on 1953, having previously been a member of the Communist Party of Australia. He was elected as the member for the former Electoral district of Wollondilly from 1978 to 1981 and the member for Kiama from 1981 to 1986. He retired on medical advice to limit his participation in political and aboriginal activities.

On 19 April 2013 he died at Port Macquarie hospital.

New South Wales Legislative Assembly
Preceded by Tom Lewis	Member for Wollondilly; 1978–1981	District abolished
District created	Member for Kiama; 1981–1986	Succeeded by Bob Harrison
