= Electoral district of Kiama =

State electoral district of New South Wales, Australia

Kiama New South Wales—Legislative Assembly
- Interactive map of district boundaries from the 2023 state election
- State: New South Wales
- Dates current: 1859–1904; 1981–present
- MP: Katelin McInerney
- Party: Labor
- Namesake: Kiama
- Electors: 55,490 (2019)
- Area: 2,275.06 km^{2} (878.4 sq mi)
- Demographic: Rural
Electorates around Kiama:
Goulburn	Shellharbour	Pacific Ocean
Goulburn	Kiama	Pacific Ocean
Monaro	South Coast	South Coast

Kiama is an electoral district of the Legislative Assembly in the Australian state of New South Wales. It is currently represented by Katelin McInerney after winning the Kiama state by-election.

The electorate is named after and includes the Municipality of Kiama. It also includes the southern part of the City of Shellharbour (including the suburbs of Albion Park and the western part of Albion Park Rail) and the part of the City of Shoalhaven to the north of the Shoalhaven river (including Bomaderry and Berry). It includes a thinly populated area to the west of Nowra south of the Shoalhaven. It also includes Marshall Mount in the City of Wollongong.

== History ==
Kiama was created in 1859. It was abolished in 1904 with the downsizing of parliament after federation and replaced by Allowrie. It was recreated in 1981, replacing parts of Illawarra and South Coast.

== Members for Kiama ==
First incarnation (1859–1904)
Member	Party	Term
Samuel Gray	None	1859–1864
Henry Parkes	None	1864–1870
John Stewart	None	1871–1874
Samuel Charles	None	1874–1880
Harman Tarrant	None	1880–1887
Angus Cameron	Free Trade	1887–1889
George Fuller	Free Trade	1889–1894
Alexander Campbell	Ind. Protectionist	1894–1895
Alexander Campbell	Protectionist	1895–1901
Alexander Campbell	Progressive	1901–1904
Second incarnation (1981–present)
Member	Party	Term
Bill Knott	Labor	1981–1986
Bob Harrison	Labor	1986–1999
Matt Brown	Labor	1999–2011
Gareth Ward	Liberal	2011–2021
Gareth Ward	Independent	2021–2025
Katelin McInerney	Labor	2025–present

== Election results ==
2025 Kiama state by-election
Party	Candidate	Votes	%	±%
Labor	Katelin McInerney	17,424	37.5	+3.1
Liberal	Serena Copley	12,170	26.2	+14.2
Independent	Kate Dezarnaulds	4,991	10.7	+10.7
Greens	Tonia Gray	3,804	8.2	–3.0
Legalise Cannabis	Don Fuggle	2,371	5.1	+5.1
Shooters, Fishers, Farmers	Felix Nelson	2,365	5.1	+5.1
Libertarian	Joshua Beer	830	1.8	+1.8
Independent	Lisa Cotton	612	1.3	+1.3
Animal Justice	Ellie Robertson	570	1.2	+1.2
Independent	Andrew Thaler	510	1.1	+1.1
Independent	Roger Woodward	390	0.8	+0.8
Sustainable Australia	Ken Davis	367	0.8	–2.9
Independent	Cyrille Jeufo Keuheu	64	0.1	+0.1
Total formal votes		46,468	96.1	−0.8
Informal votes		1,863	3.9	+0.8
Turnout		48,331	77.3	
Two-party-preferred result
Labor	Katelin McInerney	20,823	60.0	–11.0
Liberal	Serena Copley	13,886	40.0	+11.0
Labor gain from Independent		Swing	–11.0	

Results are not final. Last updated on 13 September 2025 at 10:12 pm.
