= Bob Harrison (Australian politician) =

Australian politician

Robert Joseph Wilson "Bob" Harrison AO (born 19 September 1934) is a former Australian politician. He was the Labor Party member of the New South Wales Legislative Assembly for the seat of Kiama from 1986 to 1999.

Harrison was born in Goulburn and attended local state schools. He was employed at the Pacific Supertex Chenille Factory in Goulburn before moving to Port Kembla in 1953 to work for AIS Steelworks. In 1955 he became a waterside worker, and also became active in the labour movement, particularly the Maritime Union of Australia. He was married on 20 October 1961 in Hobart, Tasmania, to Angela, with whom he has two daughters. In 1971 he was elected to Shellharbour Municipal Council and would remain on the council until 1991. He served as mayor 1974–75 and 1977–91.

In 1986, the Labor member for the local state seat of Kiama, Bill Knott, resigned on medical grounds and Harrison was preselected as the Labor candidate for the by-election. He won easily, and held the seat without serious challenge until his retirement in 1999.

Harrison was awarded the Order of Australia in 2005.

New South Wales Legislative Assembly
Preceded by Bill Knott	Member for Kiama; 1986–1999	Succeeded by Matt Brown
