= Harman Tarrant =

Irish-born Australian politician

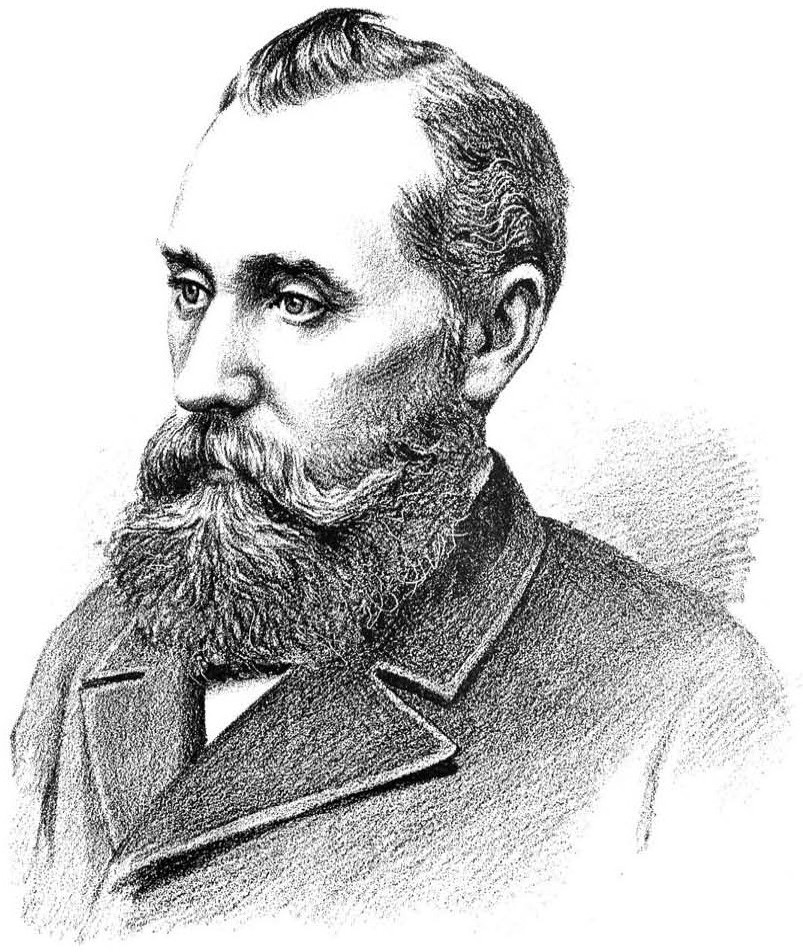

Harman John Tarrant (14 November 1844 – 10 September 1900) was an Irish-born Australian surgeon and politician.

Tarrant was born in Belfast, the son of revenue collector Harman Tarrant and Elizabeth O'Callaghan. He trained as a medical doctor in Dublin, London, Paris and Edinburgh, and was a fellow of the Royal College of Surgeons.

He emigrated to New South Wales, arriving in around 1868, running his medical practise in Kiama from 1869. On 10 August 1869 he married Frances Jane Hargraves, daughter of gold pioneer Edward Hargraves and they would have six children. He moved his practise to Sydney in 1879 and was appointed an honorary surgeon to the Sydney Hospital.

In 1880 he was elected to the New South Wales Legislative Assembly for Kiama at the 1880 by-election. He was re-elected in 1880, 1882 and 1885, resigning in December 1886 due to the pressures of his professional practice as a surgeon. Tarrant was active in the Masonic movement, rising in 1884 to grand master of the Grand Lodge of New South Wales Freemasons, which had broken away from the Grand Lodges of England, Scotland and Ireland. He worked to unite the lodges as the United Grand Lodge of New South Wales, with Lord Carrington, Governor of New South Wales, being elected the first grand master. In 1890 was appointed to the New South Wales Legislative Council, where he remained until his seat was declared vacant on 12 May 1896 because he had been absent for 2 complete sessions.

In 1887 he treated the actor William E. Sheridan who had a stroke at the theatre, however Sheridan died the following day. Tarrant would later have a relationship with Sheridan's widow, Louise Davenport, with an obituary stating that "his downfall began when he became so hopelessly infatuated with a woman as to disappear with her from the scene of social, professional, and political distinctions which he had honorably won". He resigned his position at Sydney Hospital by July 1894, and left Sydney for England with Davenport, taking £400 which was the entirety of his available cash, abandoning his family, medical practice, book debts estimated at £2,000 and his library and surgical instruments valued at £300 to £400. His wife had sold the books and instruments to pay for household and family expenses. While in London he had worked as a theatrical agent for Davenport.

He returned to Sydney in 1898 and was bankrupted on his own application in October 1898, owing £114,000. He applied to be discharged from bankruptcy, with Justice Walker finding that he had borrowed money in 1892 to invest in a speculative mining venture in Queensland for Bismuth, used for treating an upset stomach, when there was no reasonable expectation he would be able to repay the money and that he left Sydney in circumstances that were prejudicial to his ability to pay his creditors. On his return to Sydney he widely promoted his claim to a "new method of healing", with advertisements funded by a partnership of C J Browning and William Charles Green and continuing after his death.

Tarrant died in Sydney on 10 September 1900 (aged 55). Francis died in Bowral in March 1914.

New South Wales Legislative Assembly
Preceded by Samuel Charles	Member for Kiama; 1880–1886	Succeeded by Angus Cameron
Masonic offices
Preceded by James Squire Farnell	Grand Master of the Grand Lodge of New South Wales; 1884–1888	Succeeded by Lord Carrington as Grand Master of the United Grand Lodge of New South Wales
