= Samuel Gray (Australian politician) =

Pastoralist, farmer and politician in New South Wales, Australia

Member of New South Wales Legislative Assembly for Kiama
- In office 1859–1864

Member of New South Wales Legislative Assembly for Illawarra
- In office 1874–1880

Member of New South Wales Legislative Assembly for The Richmond
- In office 1882–1885

Personal details
- Born: Samuel William Gray; 1 January 1823 Armagh, Ireland
- Died: 19 April 1889 (aged 66) Woollahra, New South Wales, Australia

Samuel William Gray (1 January 1823 – 19 April 1889) was an Irish Australian pastoralist, farmer and member of the New South Wales Legislative Assembly for Kiama (1859–1864), Illawarra (1874–1880) and The Richmond (1882–1885).

== Biography ==
Samuel Gray was born in Armagh, Ireland on 1 January 1823 to James Mackey Gray and Sarah Anna Burton, the first of their five children and their only son. Around 1835, his family moved to New South Wales. There, James bought his brother-in-law's grant of 1,280 acres (5.2 km^{2}) of land south of Kiama, naming it "The Omega Retreat". James became a farmer and grazier there, also assisting many Ulster Protestants in migrating to Kiama.

He was educated at the Normal Institution in Sydney. After going to sea in 1859 and to Bendigo during its gold rush, he returned to Kiama, becoming a farmer and grazier.

On 16 June 1859, Samuel Gray was elected as the member of the New South Wales Legislative Assembly for Kiama, with 70.4 percent of the vote. He was re-elected unopposed in 1860. After leaving office in 1864, he was elected as the member for Illawarra in 1874 with 56.8 percent of the vote, and re-elected unopposed in 1877. He left office again in 1880 and was elected by the Richmond in 1882 with 60.4 percent of the vote, a position which he held until 1885 when he did not re-contest.

He married Mary Bray on 14 March 1862 at Campbelltown. They had five daughters and two sons. In the early 1860s, he cleared and improved a large block of land on the Tweed River, in partnership with his brother-in-law Joshua Bray.

Later, he moved to Sydney, where he had business interests, living there until his death in Woollahra on 19 April 1889. He was buried in the Gerringong Cemetery in Sydney.

== See also ==
- New South Wales Legislative Assembly

New South Wales Legislative Assembly
Preceded by New seat	Member for Kiama; 1859 – 1864	Succeeded by Henry Parkes
Preceded by William Forster	Member for Illawarra; 1874 – 1880	Succeeded by Alexander Stuart
Preceded by Charles Fawcett	Member for Richmond; 1882 – 1885	Succeeded by Thomas Ewing; Patrick Hogan
