= Henry Parkes =

Australian politician (1815–1896)

The Honourable Sir Henry Parkes GCMG
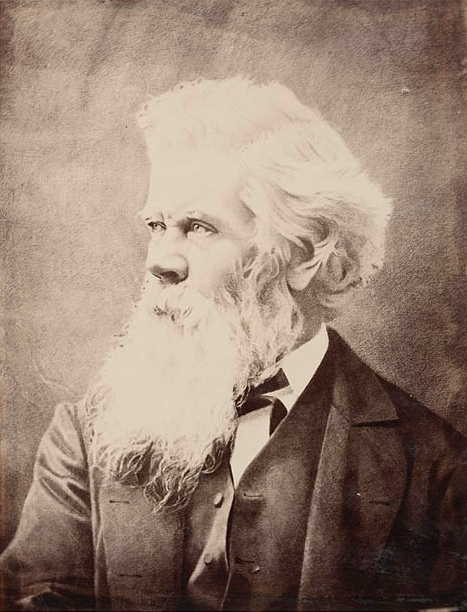

7th Premier of New South Wales
- In office 14 May 1872 – 8 February 1875
- Monarch: Victoria
- Governor: Sir Hercules Robinson
- Preceded by: Sir James Martin
- Succeeded by: Sir John Robertson
- In office 22 March 1877 – 16 August 1877
- Monarch: Victoria
- Governor: Sir Hercules Robinson
- Preceded by: Sir John Robertson
- Succeeded by: Sir John Robertson
- In office 21 December 1878 – 9 January 1883
- Monarch: Victoria
- Governor: Sir Hercules Robinson; Augustus Loftus
- Preceded by: James Farnell
- Succeeded by: Sir Alexander Stuart
- In office 25 January 1887 – 16 January 1889
- Monarch: Victoria
- Governor: The Lord Carrington
- Preceded by: Sir Patrick Jennings
- Succeeded by: Sir George Dibbs
- In office 8 March 1889 – 23 October 1891
- Monarch: Victoria
- Governor: The Lord Carrington; The Earl of Jersey
- Preceded by: Sir George Dibbs
- Succeeded by: Sir George Dibbs

Personal details
- Born: 27 May 1815 Coventry, Warwickshire, England
- Died: 27 April 1896 (aged 80) Sydney, Colony of New South Wales
- Resting place: Faulconbridge, New South Wales
- Citizenship: British subject
- Party: Free Trade
- Spouse(s): Clarinda Varney (m. 1836 – d. 1888); Eleanor Dixon (m. 1889 – d. 1895); Julia Lynch (m. 1895 – 1896; his death)
- Children: Thomas; Clarinda Martha; Clarinda Sarah; Robert; Mary; Mary Edith; Milton; Lily Maria; Annie; Gertrude; Varney; Lily Faulconbridge; Sydney; Kenilworth; Aurora; Henry Cobden; Charles Jessel
- Profession: Statesman

Sir Henry Parkes, GCMG (27 May 1815 – 27 April 1896) was a colonial Australian politician and the longest-serving non-consecutive premier of the Colony of New South Wales, the present-day state of New South Wales in the Commonwealth of Australia. He has been referred to as the "Father of Federation" due to his early promotion for the federation of the six colonies of Australia, as an early critic of British convict transportation and as a proponent for the expansion of the Australian continental rail network.

Parkes delivered his famous Tenterfield Oration in 1889, which yielded a federal conference in 1890 and a Constitutional Convention in 1891, the first of a series of meetings that led to the federation of Australia. He died in 1896, five years before this process was completed. He was described during his lifetime by The Times as "the most commanding figure in Australian politics". Alfred Deakin described Sir Henry Parkes as having flaws but nonetheless being "a large-brained self-educated Titan whose natural field was found in Parliament".

== Early life ==
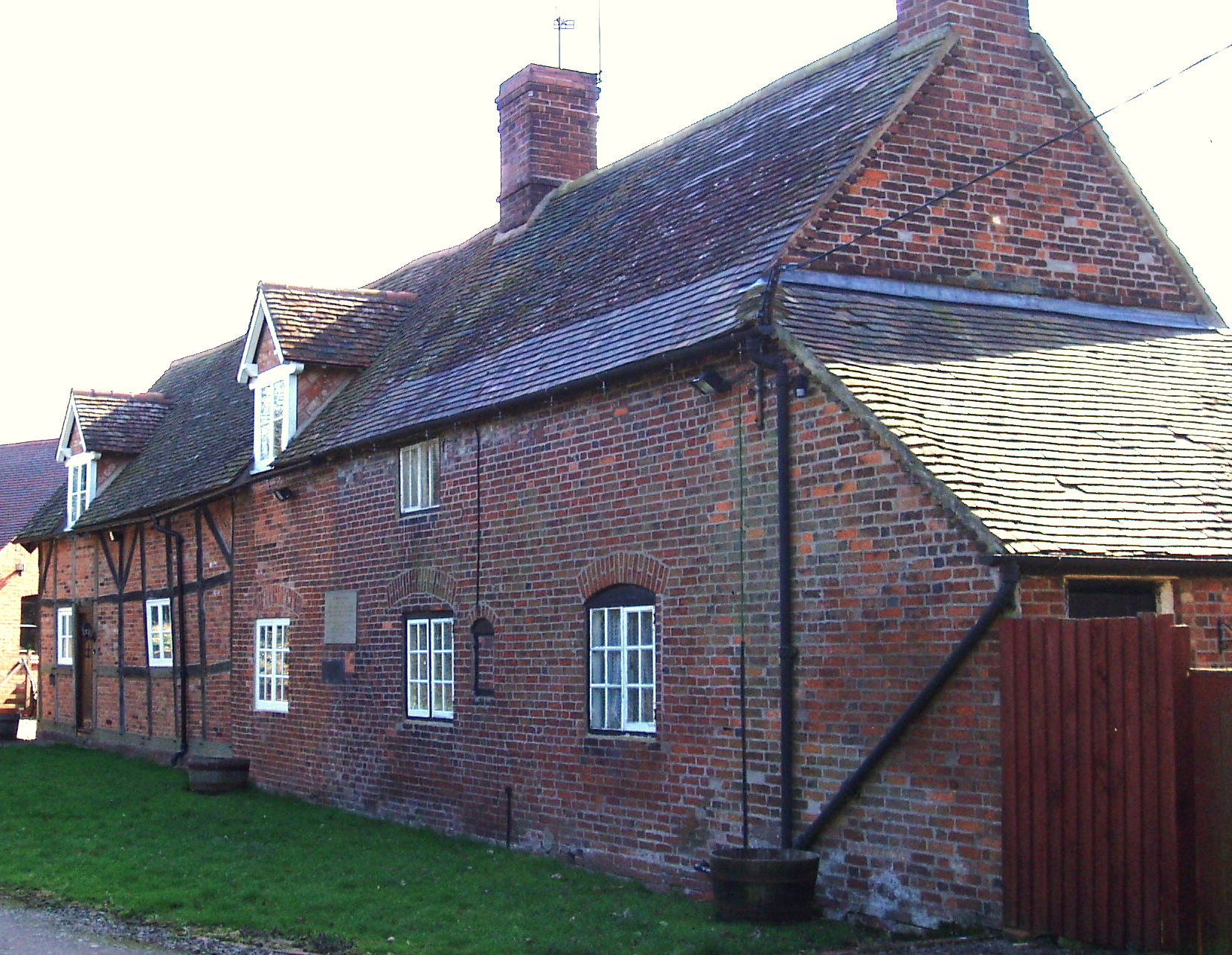
Birthplace in Canley, Coventry, England

Parkes was born in Canley (now a suburb of Coventry) in Warwickshire, England, and christened in the nearby village of Stoneleigh. His father, Thomas Parkes, was a small-scale tenant farmer. His mother, Martha Falconbridge, died in 1842 and would serve as the namesake for his home in New South Wales. He received little formal education.

As a young adult, Parkes educated himself by reading extensively, and also developed an interest in poetry. In 1835, he wrote poems (later included in his first volume of poems) that were addressed to Clarinda Varney, the daughter of a local butcher. On 11 July 1836 they married.

=== Immigration to Australia ===
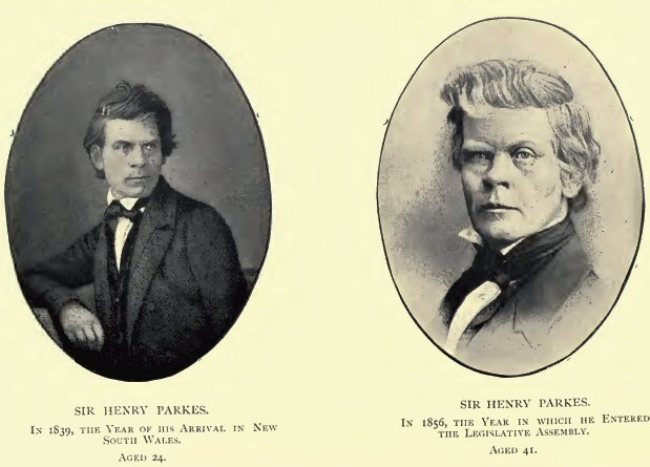
Parkes in 1839 (left) upon immigration to Australia, and in 1856 (right) upon his entry into the Legislative Assembly

After the loss of their two children at an early age and a few unsuccessful weeks living in London, Parkes and his wife emigrated to New South Wales. They travelled aboard the Strathfieldsaye, which arrived at Sydney on 25 July 1839. Another child was born two days before. On arrival they had only a few shillings between them and had to sell their belongings as Parkes looked for work. He was eventually employed as a labourer with John Jamison, one of the colony's wealthiest settlers, on the Regentville estate near Penrith. He was paid with £25 a year and food rations. After spending six months at Regentville, he returned to Sydney and worked in various low-paying jobs, first with an ironmongery store and then with a firm of engineers and brass-founders.

About a year after his arrival in Sydney, Parkes was hired by the New South Wales Customs Department as a tide waiter, and given the task of inspecting merchant vessels to guard against smuggling. He had been recommended for this post by Jamison's son-in-law, William John Gibbes, who was the manager of Regentville and the son of Colonel John George Nathaniel Gibbes who led the Customs Department.

Parkes's financial position improved due to his stable new government job, even though he was still burdened with a backlog of undischarged debts. Parkes continued to write poetry. A volume entitled Stolen Moments was published in Sydney in 1842. He met the poet Charles Harpur and William Augustine Duncan, the editor of a local newspaper; he mentions in his Fifty Years of Australian History, that these two men became his "chief advisers in matters of intellectual resource". In early 1846, he left the Customs Department after a disagreement with Colonel Gibbes over a press leak that concerned the alleged behaviour of one of Parkes's co-workers. Despite this, Parkes would continue to remain on friendly terms with Gibbes and his family for the rest of his life. Gibbes' grandson, Frederick Jamison Gibbes, was also a member of the Parliament of New South Wales in the 1880s and like Parkes became a supporter of federation.

After his departure from the Customs Service, Parkes worked in the private sector. He worked as an ivory and bone turner and later ran a shop of his own in Hunter Street. At one stage, he owned several newspapers, including The People's Advocate and New South Wales Vindicator and Empire. He was not successful as a businessman and eventually went bankrupt after running up debts totaling £48,500. He continued to support Australian culture and published poetry in his newspapers.

== Early campaigns ==
During his early years in Australia, Parkes took an interest in political issues. Most notably, he joined the growing movement in the colony for self-governance. This was already a major political issue; the New South Wales Legislative Council had been reformed in 1843 to include elected members for the first time. He also became an opponent of the transportation of convicts to Australia and a supporter of land reform.

He voiced his opinions on political issues in Atlas and the People's Advocate. He first became involved in politics in 1848 when he worked for Robert Lowe in his successful campaign in the Legislative Council elections. The following year, he supported a petition to the Parliament of the United Kingdom for fewer restrictions on voting. He spoke in favour of universal suffrage for the first time. The petition succeeded in securing less restrictive voting requirements.

On 8 June 1849, Parkes attended a protest in Circular Quay against the arrival of a convict ship in Sydney. He continued to support the anti-transportation cause with writings and speeches, until the British Government ended almost all transportation to Australia in 1853.

In December 1850, Parkes founded the Empire newspaper. At first a broadsheet only published weekly, it soon became a daily. Parkes was loyal to the British Empire, but also wanted critics of the establishment to have a voice. As a result, the paper became critical of the incumbent Governor Charles Augustus FitzRoy and the rest of the colonial government. He also attacked William Wentworth's plans to introduce self-governance because it proposed an unelected Legislative Council and a restrictive franchise for the elected Legislative Assembly. The proposal was eventually passed after some amendments to make it more democratic. Some years later, Parkes said that, "in the heated opposition to the objectionable parts of Mr Wentworth's scheme, no sufficient attention was given to its great merits".

== Legislative Assembly ==
The first parliament under responsible government commenced on 22 May 1856 but, for some months, no stable government could be formed. The Empire was not profitable despite its reputation. Around the end of 1856, he resigned his seat to focus on saving the newspaper business.

=== First Parliament ===
He was a strong supporter of free trade, immigration programmes and education reforms. He introduced laws that gave the Government the power to employ teachers and create public schools, abolished government funding to religious schools and improved prisons.

Parkes left his wife and five, soon to become six, children in poverty, on a rented farm at Werrington.

The Public Schools Act 1866, introduced by Parkes, required teachers to have training and created a funding mechanism. Parkes also initiated the introduction of nurses from England trained by Florence Nightingale.

In 1867 to 1868 Alfred, Duke of Edinburgh (Queen Victoria's second oldest son) visited the Australian colonies. On 12 March 1868 the Duke was shot in the back by one Henry James O'Farrell. The would-be assassin was Irish, and at the time claimed he was a Fenian. The wound, while painful, was not fatal. Despite the Duke's requests for leniency, the colonial government allowed O'Farrell to be executed. O'Farrell had, in the meantime, admitted he was not really a member of the Fenians, but by the time of the execution other acts of violence connected with the Fenians (most notably the murder of D'Arcy McGee in Canada) spurred anti-Fenian and anti-Irish Catholic feelings. Parkes pushed anti-Fenianism hard. For a while his claims of a vast Fenian conspiracy in New South Wales gained some traction, but when nothing further occurred public opinion began to reverse and he was accused of being anti-Irish. As a result, his political position was weakened.

== Resignation, re-election and first premiership ==
His ongoing financial woes had become a matter of some public notoriety, causing the barrister and fellow politician, William Dalley, to remark of Parkes, in 1872, that, "If he lives long, he will rule not over a nation of admirers and friends, but of creditors".

His government also sponsored the building of railway and telegraph lines and reduced some taxes.

Parkes was accused of manoeuvring to get rid of Butler, who was seen as an opponent within Parkes's faction, but no evidence was found to support this.

The ministry continued to government, though it did not succeed in creating an elected upper house. In February 1875, Governor Robinson's decision to release of the bushranger Frank Gardiner led to the defeat of the ministry. Subsequent discussions between Robinson, Parkes and the Colonial Office clarified the governor's responsibilities in pardoning prisoners.

=== Second premiership ===
Robertson returned to the Premiership from August to December 1877, including an election in October.

Parkes was returned for Canterbury. .

=== Third premiership ===
It produced two years of stable government after years of instability.

In the 1880 election, Parkes was returned for St Leonards.

=== Electoral defeat ===
Objection was taken to claims of parliamentary corruption he had made when resigning from Parliament in 1884.

Parkes did not apologise, but his ministry was discouraged from going further.

=== Fourth premiership ===
Parkes campaigned against Chinese immigration at the point when it became a political issue. He was received with "loud and continuous cheers" in the Legislative Assembly when he spoke of the need "to terminate a moral and social pestilence, and preserve to ourselves and to our children unaltered and unspotted the rights and privileges which we have received from our forefathers". Along with many politicians of his day, Parkes avoided the claim that the Chinese and other Asians should be excluded because they were an "inferior" race.

He said: "They are a superior set of people . . . a nation of an old and deep-rooted civilisation. . . . It is because I believe the Chinese to be a powerful race capable of taking a great hold upon the country, and because I want to preserve the type of my own nation . . . that I am and always have been opposed to the influx of Chinese."

The government was defeated on allegations that William Meeke Fehon, whom he had appointed a rail commissioner, was corrupt. His wife Clarinda Varney (after whom Clarinda Falls at Faulconbridge, New South Wales were named) died in 1888. A year later, he married Eleanor Dixon. In February 1889, Parkes opened Fairfield Public School in Western Sydney.

== Fifth premiership and Federation ==
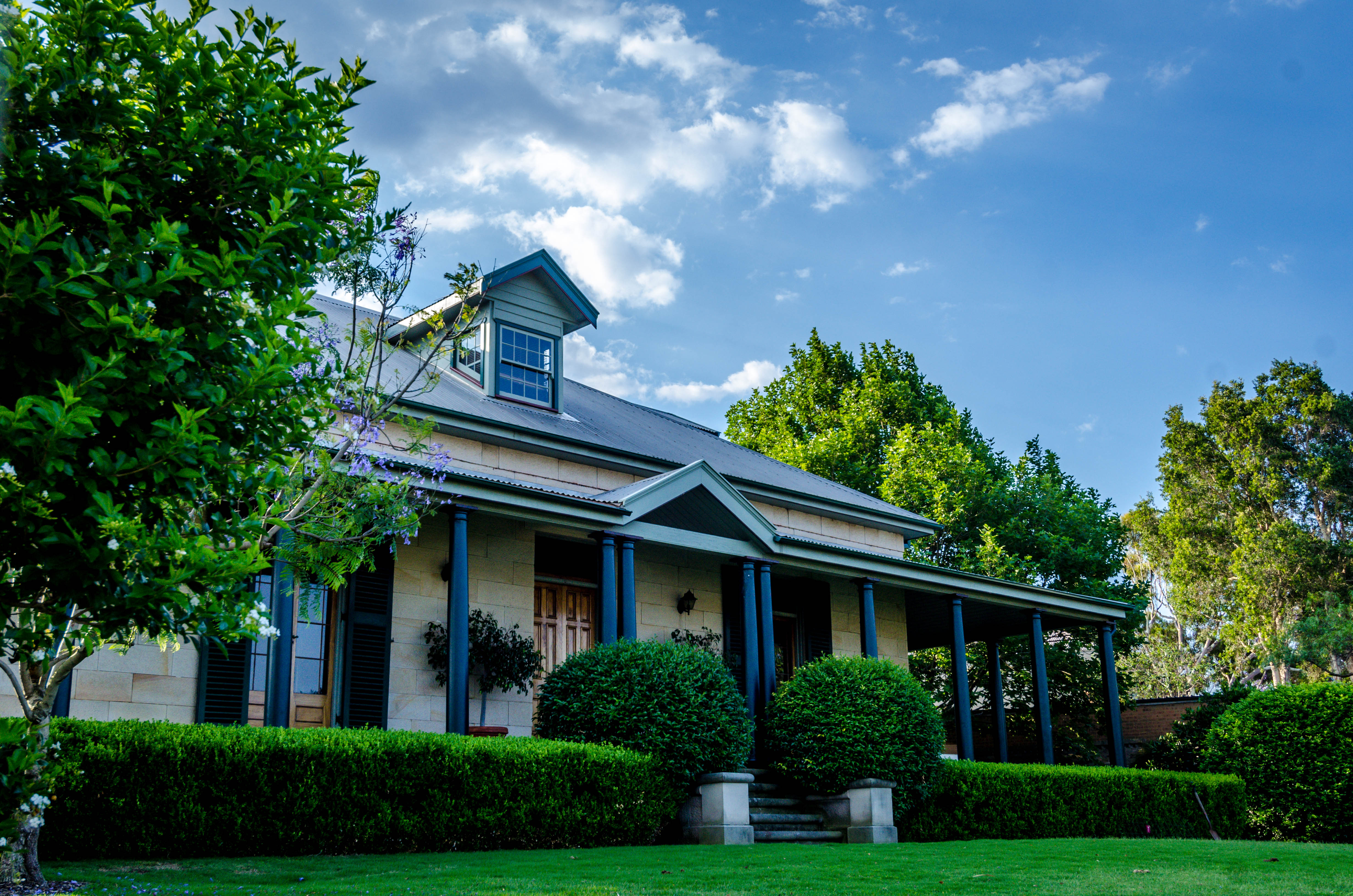
Hampton Villa, Balmain, New South Wales, where Parkes lived from 1888 to 1892

The proposal to join the colonies of Australia into a federation became a major political issue.

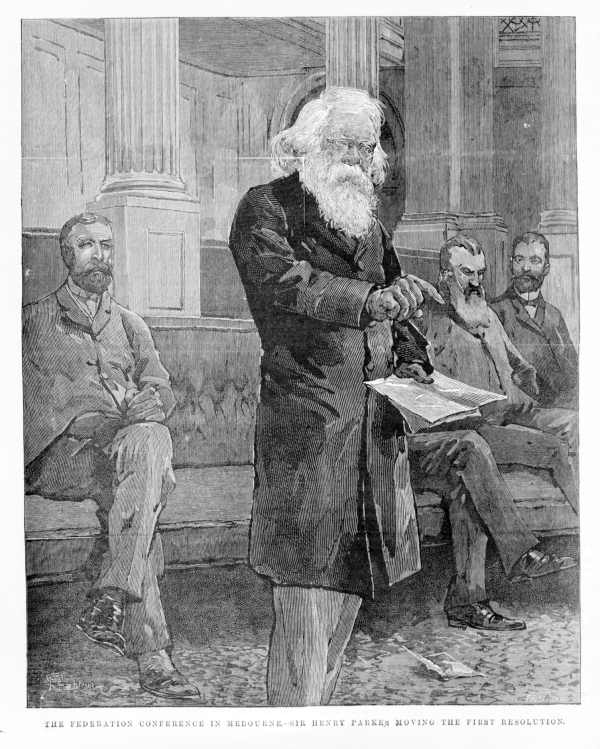
A wood engraving of Sir Henry Parkes moving the first resolution at the federation conference in Melbourne, 1 March 1890

On 24 October 1889, at the Tenterfield School of Arts, Parkes delivered the Tenterfield Oration. The oration was seen as a clarion call to federalists and he called for a convention "to devise the constitution which would be necessary for bringing into existence a federal government with a federal parliament for the conduct of national undertaking".

Parkes proposed the name of Commonwealth of Australia for the new nation.

=== On the backbench ===
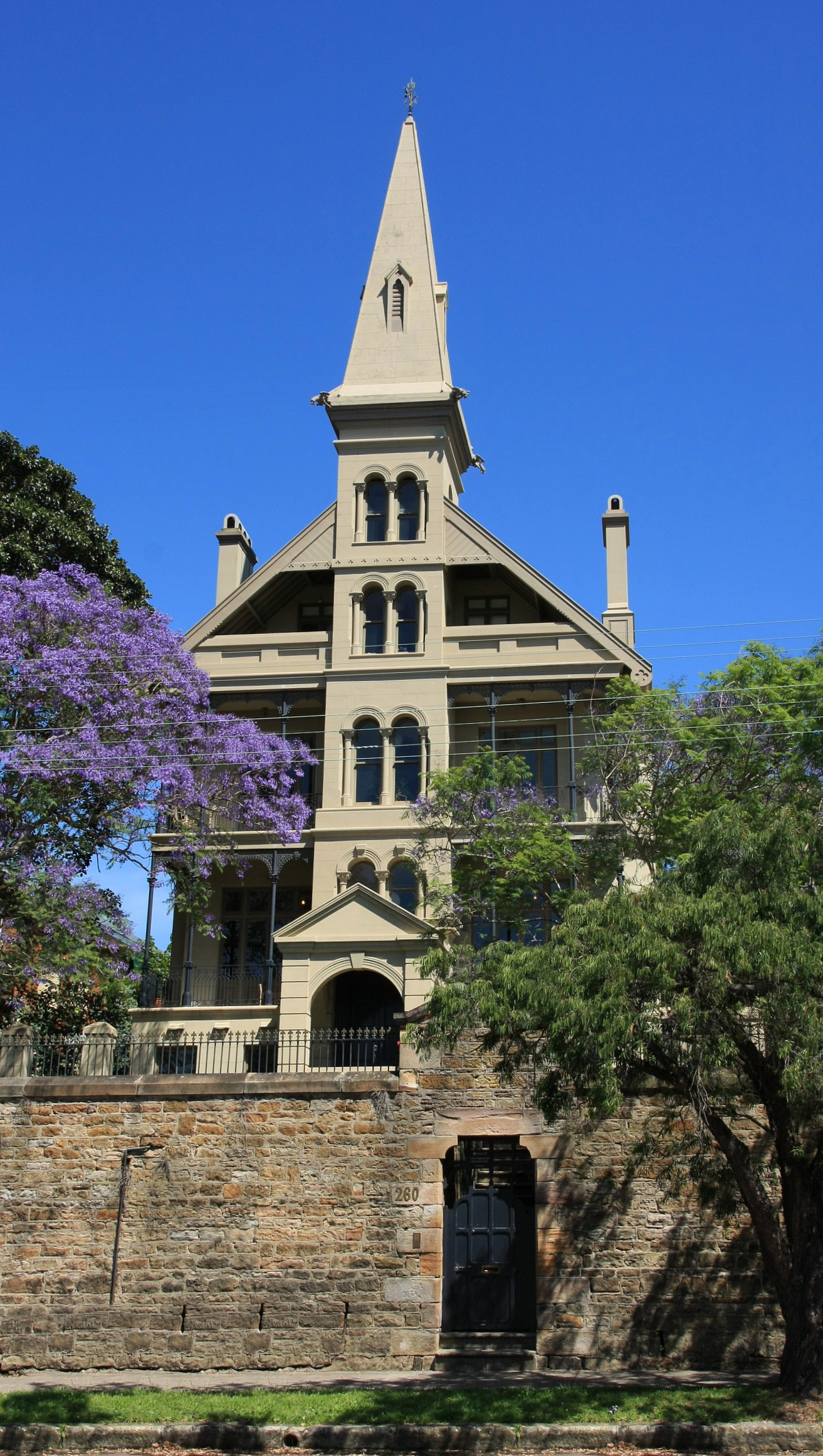
Kenilworth, the Gothic home in Annandale where Parkes lived until his death in 1896.

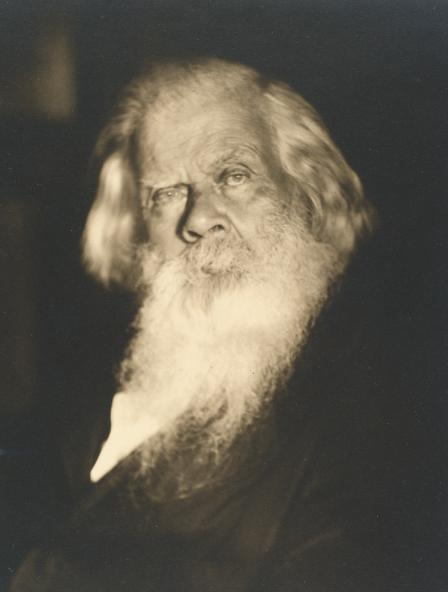
Parkes in 1893, photographed by Henry Walter Barnett

Parkes, now 77 years old, was replaced by Reid as the leader of the Free Trade Party, and he henceforth sat as an independent member. Parkes's political energies were now wholly occupied by Federation. In response to pressure from Parkes, Reid endorsed a scheme of a second, directly elected federal convention, followed by a referendum. Parkes had already mooted a referendum, but strongly favoured a convention delegates being chosen by premiers, rather than elected by the public. In quest of his political enemy, Parkes stood against Reid at the 1895 general election for Sydney-King, winning 44 percent of the vote. In 1896 he sought to re-enter parliament at the by-election for the seat of Waverley, winning just 11.5 percent of the vote. This proved to be the anti-climactic end of his 40 year long career in the New South Wales Parliament.

Parkes resided at Kenilworth, a Gothic mansion in Johnston Street, Annandale, a Sydney suburb. Its owner sought the prestige of having Parkes as a tenant, and gave favourable terms.

He died on 27 April; by that time he was living in poverty.

His portrait by the artist Julian Ashton is in a public collection in Sydney.

== Evaluations ==
Parkes was described during his lifetime by The Times as "the most commanding figure in Australian politics". Alfred Deakin described him as "though not rich or versatile, his personality was massive, durable and imposing, resting upon elementary qualities of human nature elevated by a strong mind. He was cast in the mould of a great man and though he suffered from numerous pettinesses, spites and failings, he was in himself a large-brained self-educated Titan whose natural field was found in Parliament and whose resources of character and intellect enabled him in his later years to overshadow all his contemporaries".

Five years after Parkes's death, Australia became a federation on 1 January 1901. The negotiations to form the federation followed directly from the conferences that Parkes had instigated.

Parkes was known for his commanding personality and skills as an orator, despite having a minor speech impediment with controlling aspirates. He spoke to his supporters in plain, down-to-earth language, and pursued his causes with great determination. Some of his acquaintances perceived him as being vain, temperamental and even rude. Despite this, he had a warm reception when he met Thomas Carlyle and Alfred, Lord Tennyson while visiting the UK. He had received almost no formal education, but educated himself by reading widely.

Parkes was not successful as a businessman or at managing his personal finances, and he had little wealth at the time of his death. On the other hand, his governments managed their finances well, largely due to the treasurers he appointed. Although he was not a socialist, he supported improving the living standards of the working class. He was less ambitious with social reform legislation in the later years of his career, due to the strong conservative opposition he encountered. In 1891, as Premier, he repulsed as "barbarous" a proposal to remove from Aboriginals the right to vote.

== Marriages and children ==
Parkes was first married to Clarinda Varney on 11 July 1836 in Birmingham. She died on 2 February 1888 in Balmain, New South Wales, aged 74. They had twelve children:

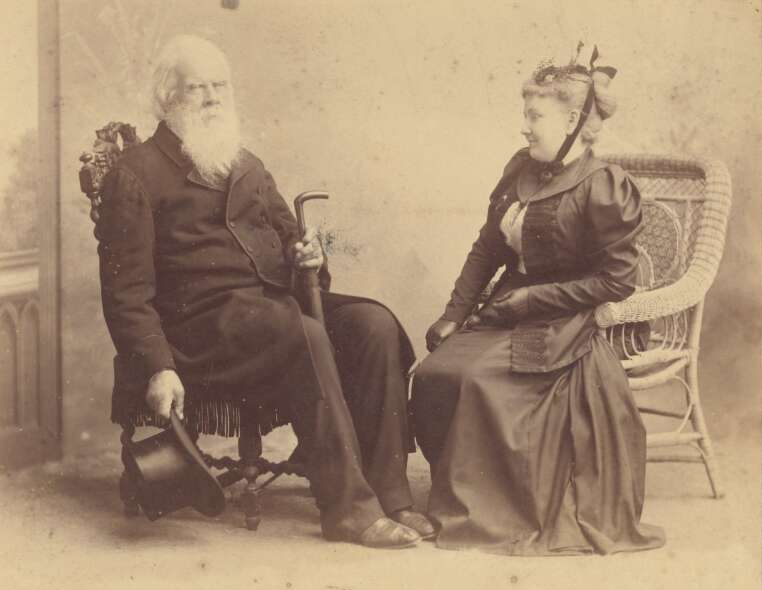
Sir Henry Parkes and the second Lady Parkes in the 1890s

- Thomas Campbell Parkes (18 April 1837 – 5 May 1837), born and died in Birmingham aged 17 days.
- Clarinda Martha Parkes (23 June 1838 – 24 June 1838), born and died in Birmingham aged one day.
- Clarinda Sarah Parkes (23 July 1839 – 11 October 1915), married William Thom and had issue.
- Robert Sydney Parkes (21 December 1843 – 2 January 1880), married and had issue.
- Mary Parkes (16 February 1846 – 5 December 1846), died aged under 10 months.
- Mary Edith Parkes (3 March 1848 – 15 December 1919), married George Murray and had issue.
- Milton Parkes (14 December 1849 – 19 January 1851), died aged 13 months.
- Lily Maria Parkes (27 October 1851 – 25 March 1854), died aged 2 years.
- Annie Thomasine Parkes (9 January 1854 – 6 February 1929), remained unmarried.
- Gertrude Amelia Parkes (13 April 1856 – 31 July 1921), married Robert Hiscox and had issue.
- Varney Parkes (4 June 1859 – 14 May 1935), married firstly Mary Murray and then her sister Isabella Murray, and had issue. An architect and Member of the New South Wales Legislative Assembly – "feeble son of an illustrious man".
- Lily Faulconbridge Parkes (7 February 1862 – 14 October 1932), remained unmarried.

After his first wife's death, Parkes married Eleanor Dixon on 6 February 1889 in Sydney. They remained married until her death on 16 July 1895 in Annandale, New South Wales, aged 38. They had five children, three born before their marriage:

- Sydney Parkes (1884 – 20 April 1937), married Marion Edith Morrissey and had issue.
- Kenilworth Parkes (1886 – 4 November 1910), married Maude Howard (later Armstrong) and had issue.
- Aurora Parkes (1888 – 29 October 1974), married Emanuel Evans, without issue.
- Henry Parkes (1890 – 8 July 1954), married Katherine Rush and had issue.
- Cobden Parkes (2 August 1892 – 15 August 1978), married Victoria Lillyman and had issue. Public servant and New South Wales Government Architect.

Parkes married thirdly in Parramatta on 23 October 1895 to Julia Lynch, his 23-year-old former cook and housekeeper. They had no children, but Lady Parkes raised her stepchildren from Sir Henry's second marriage. They remained married until his death a year later. Lady (Julia) Parkes died on 11 July 1919 in Lewisham, New South Wales.

== Honours ==
Henry Parkes was created Knight Commander of the Order of St Michael and St George in 1877, and Knight Grand Cross of the same order in 1888.

His image appears on the Australian one-dollar coin of 1996; and on the Centenary of Federation commemoration Australian $5 note issued in 2001.

== Literary works ==
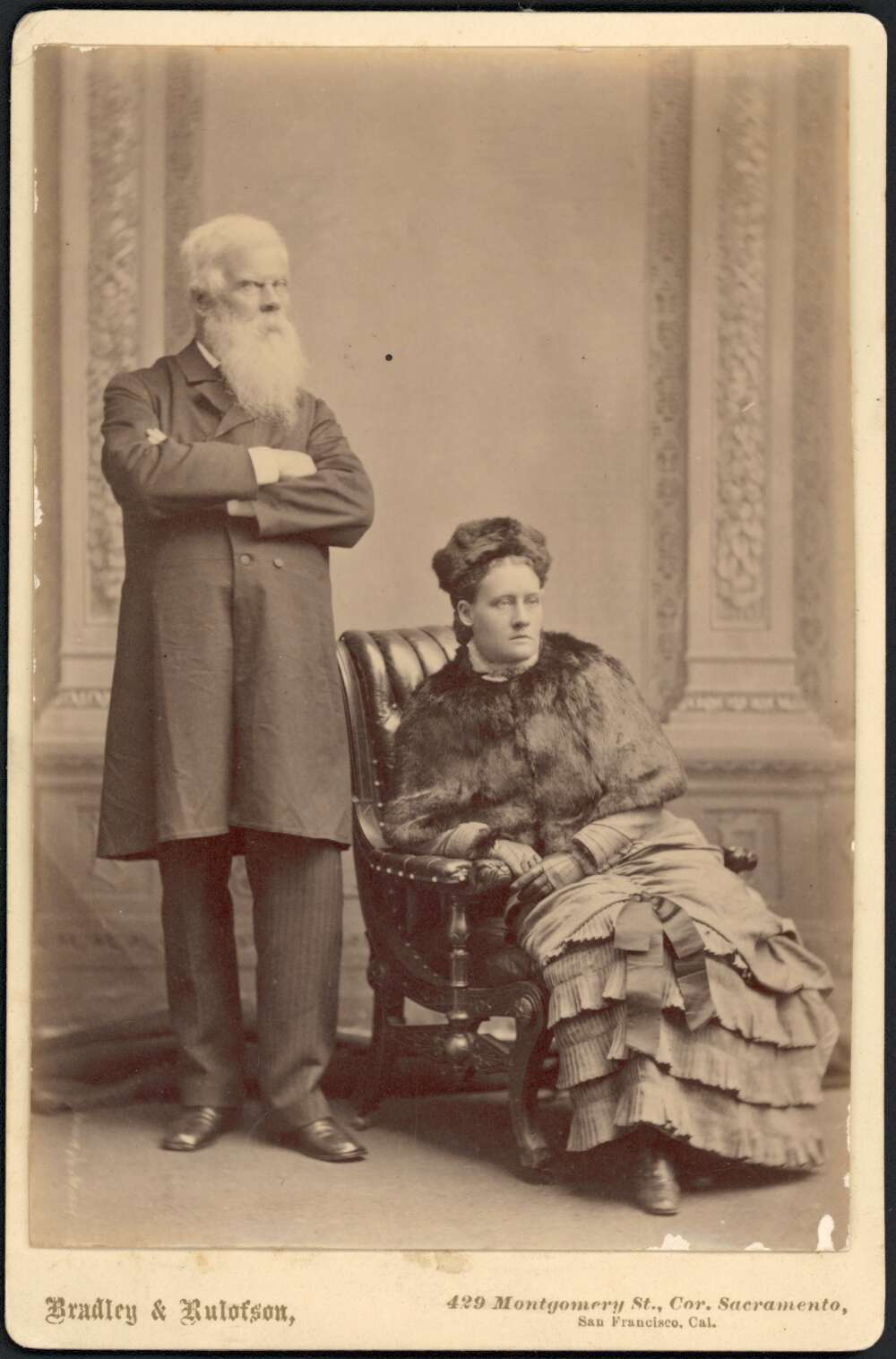
Sir Henry Parkes and Miss Annie Parkes in the 1890s

- Stolen Moments (1842)
- Murmurs of the Stream (1857)
- Studies in Rhyme (1870)
- The Beauteous Terrorist and Other Poems (1885)
- Fragmentary Thoughts (1889)
- Sonnets and Other Verses (1895)
- Australian Views of England (1869)
- Fifty Years in the Making of Australian History (1892)
- Speeches on Various Occasions (1876, and another collection dealing mostly with federation appeared in 1890 under the title of
- The Federal Government of Australasia. (1890)
- An emigrant's home letters: with preface and notes by Annie T. Parkes , Sydney: Angus & Robertson, 1896, Wikidata Q108681352 – via Wikisource

=== Selected list of poems ===
Title	Year	First published	Reprinted/collected in
"The Buried Chief "	1886	The Sydney Morning Herald, 19 December 1891	Fragmentary Thoughts, Samuel E. Lees, 1889, pp. 17-18

Others

- "Sunrise, from Bourke's Statue" (1850)
- "Fatherland" (1856)
- "Weary" (1892)
- "Four Score" (1895)

== Legacy and memorials ==
=== Henry Parkes Oration ===
The Henry Parkes Foundation hosted the inaugural Henry Parkes Oration in 2001, when it was delivered by Gordon Samuels, and has held the event annually since 2004.

=== Named after him ===
The following places and other things were named after Henry Parkes:

- Division of Parkes (1901–1969), a former Sydney electorate in the Australian House of Representatives
- Division of Parkes, a current regional electorate in the House of Representatives
- Parkes, New South Wales, a regional town
- Parkes, Australian Capital Territory, a suburb of Canberra
- Parkes Observatory, a radio telescope near Parkes, New South Wales
- Parkes Way, an arterial road in Canberra
- Parkesbourne, New South Wales, a locality near Goulburn
- Parkeston, Western Australia, an outlying area of Kalgoorlie
- Sir Henry Parkes Avenue, Medowie, New South Wales
- Sir Henry Parkes Memorial School in Tenterfield
- Sir Henry Parkes School of Arts, aka the Tenterfield School of Arts museum and theatre complex, where Parkes made the famous "Tenterfield Oration"

Parkes is also commemorated in his birthplace Canley, Coventry by the naming of a road (Sir Henry Parkes Road) and a school (Sir Henry Parkes Primary School) in Coventry. Canley railway station also commemorates the link with Sir Henry Parkes with Australian-themed decor.

He is a character in the play Duke of Edinburgh Assassinated or The Vindication of Henry Parkes (1971).

== See also ==
- Chief Secretary's Building – The office building Parkes worked in, and helped design and furnish
- First Parkes ministry (1872–1876)
- Second Parkes ministry (1877)
- Third Parkes ministry (1878–1883)
- Fourth Parkes ministry (1887–1889)
- Fifth Parkes ministry (1889–1891)

Political offices
Preceded by James Martin	Premier of New South Wales (first term); 1872–1875	Succeeded by John Robertson
Preceded by John Robertson	Premier of New South Wales (second term); 1877	Succeeded by John Robertson
Preceded by James Farnell	Premier of New South Wales (third term); 1878–1883	Succeeded by Alexander Stuart
Preceded by Patrick Jennings	Premier of New South Wales (fourth term); 1887–1889	Succeeded by George Dibbs
Preceded by George Dibbs	Premier of New South Wales (fifth term); 1889–1891	Succeeded by George Dibbs
New South Wales Legislative Council
Preceded by William Wentworth	City of Sydney; May 1854 – Feb 1856; With: Campbell 1854–56, Thurlow 1854–55, Wilshire 1855–56	Succeeded by George Thornton
New South Wales Legislative Assembly
Preceded by New seat	Member for Sydney City; Mar 1856 – Dec 1856; With: Campbell, Cowper, Wilshire	Succeeded by William Dalley
Preceded by James Pye	Member for Cumberland (North Riding); 1858; With: Smith	Succeeded by John Plunkett
Preceded by New seat	Member for East Sydney; 1859–1861; With: Black, Cowper/Faucett, Martin	Succeeded by William Forster
Preceded by Samuel Gray	Member for Kiama; 1864–1870	Succeeded by John Stewart
Preceded by Marshall Burdekin; James Hart; James Neale; Robert Stewart	Member for East Sydney; 1869–1870; With: Buchanan, King, Martin	Succeeded by Bowie Wilson
Preceded by Henry Stephen	Member for Mudgee; 1872	Succeeded by Joseph Innes
Preceded by David Buchanan; George King; James Martin; Bowie Wilson	Member for East Sydney; 1872–1877; With: Macintosh, Neale/Moore/Davies, Samuel/Oakes/Stuart	Succeeded by James Greenwood
Preceded by Richard Hill	Member for Canterbury; 1877–1880; With: Lucas	Succeeded by William Pigott
Preceded by John Davies; James Greenwood; John Macintosh	Member for East Sydney; 1880–1882; With: Dangar, Reid, Renwick	Succeeded by Edmund Barton; George Griffiths; John McElhone
Preceded by John Dillon	Member for Tenterfield; 1882–1884	Succeeded by Charles Lee
Preceded by John Gannon	Member for Argyle; 1885	Succeeded by Francis Tait
Preceded by George Dibbs	Member for St Leonards; 1888–1895; With: Ives, Cullen, Burns/Clark	Succeeded by Edward Clark
