= Electoral results for the district of University of Sydney =

Election results for University of Sydney, New South Wales, Australia

University of Sydney, an electoral district of the Legislative Assembly in the Australian state of New South Wales, was created in 1876 and abolished in 1880.

Election	Member	Party
1876 by	William Windeyer	None
1877	William Windeyer	None
1879 by	Edmund Barton	None

== Election results ==
=== Elections in the 1870s ===
==== 1879 by-election ====
1879 University of Sydney by-election Tuesday 26 August
Candidate	Votes	%
Edmund Barton (elected)	58	60
Arthur Renwick	38	40
Total formal votes	96	100
Informal votes	0	0
Turnout	96	57

William Windeyer resigned.

==== 1877 ====
1877 New South Wales colonial election: University of Sydney Tuesday 6 November
Candidate	Votes	%
William Windeyer (re-elected)	unopposed	

==== 1876 by-election ====
1876 University of Sydney by-election Friday 8 September
Candidate	Votes	%
William Windeyer (elected)	49	53
Edmund Barton	43	47
Total formal votes	92	100
Informal votes	0	0
Turnout	92	83
