= 1879 University of Sydney colonial by-election =

By-election in New South Wales, Australia

- 15 July 1879

Electoral district of University of Sydney in the New South Wales Legislative Assembly
- Registered: 169 (▲11)
- Turnout: 56.8% (▼26.1) (Note: Compared to 1876 as the seat was won unopposed and no election was held in 1877.)
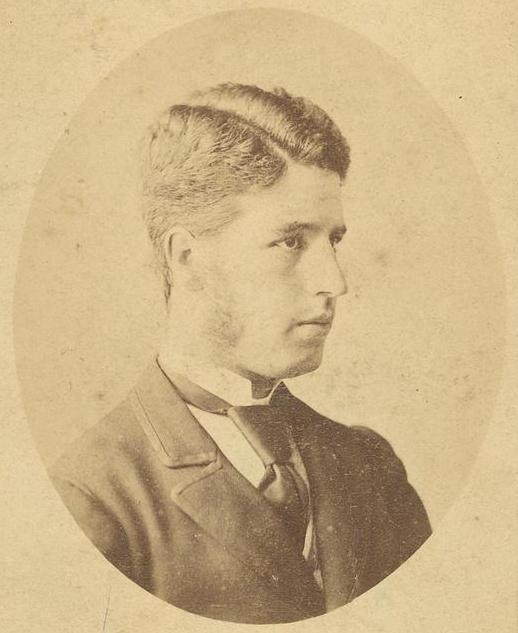

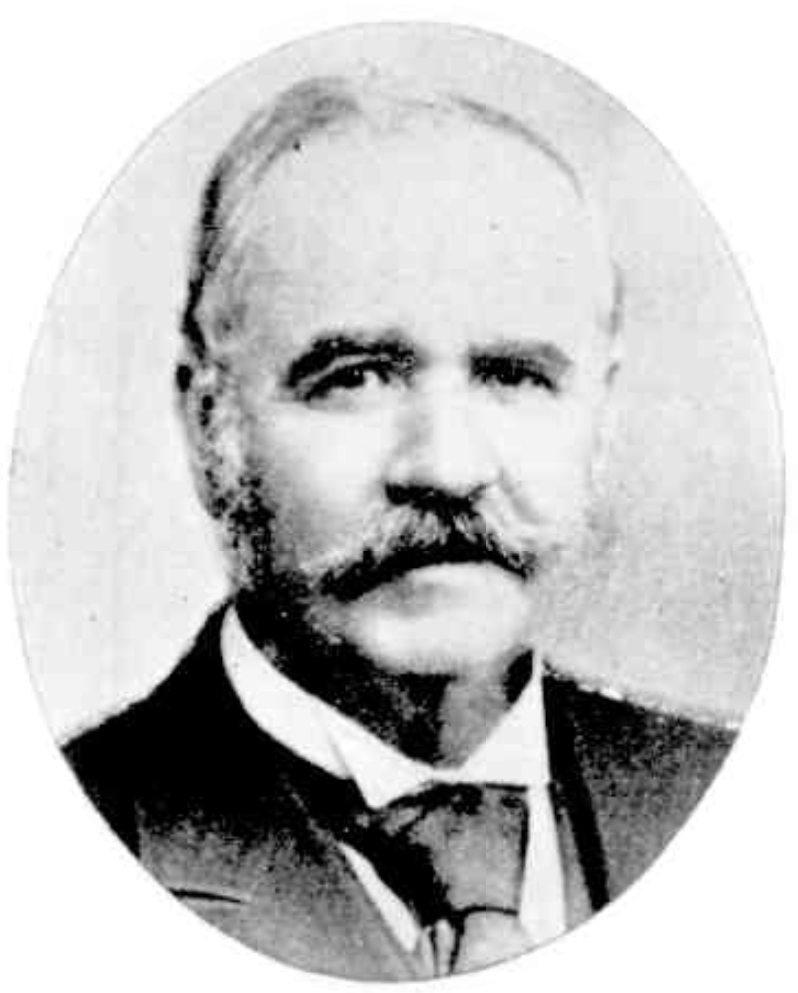
Candidate	Edmund Barton	Arthur Renwick
Popular vote	58	38
Percentage	60.4%	39.6%
Swing	▲13.7% (Note: Compared to his 1876 run.)	New
Member before election
William Windeyer
Elected Member
Edmund Barton

A by-election was held for the New South Wales Legislative Assembly electorate of University of Sydney on 15 July 1879 because William Windeyer resigned to accept a temporary appointment as a judge of the Supreme Court.

While there was no qualification for candidates, Edmund Barton had graduated with a Master of Arts in 1870. and Arthur Renwick was an examiner in medicine and had been elected to the Senate of the University of Sydney in 1877. Barton was the unsuccessful candidate for the seat at the first election in 1876, while this was Renwick's first attempt at parliament. Renwick would be elected to parliament 4 months later at the East Sydney by-election.

== Dates ==
Date	Event
10 August 1879	William Windeyer resigned.
11 August 1879	Writ of election issued by the Speaker of the Legislative Assembly.
23 August 1879	Nominations at the Great Hall of the University
26 August 1879	Polling day
9 September 1879	Return of writ

== Result ==
1879 University of Sydney by-election Tuesday 26 August
Candidate	Votes	%
Edmund Barton (elected)	58	60.4
Arthur Renwick	38	39.6
Total formal votes	96	100.0
Informal votes	0	0.0
Turnout	96	56.8

== See also ==
- Electoral results for the district of University of Sydney
- List of New South Wales state by-elections
