= Edmund Barton =

Prime Minister of Australia from 1901 to 1903

The Right Honourable Sir Edmund Barton GCMG KC
- Official portrait, 1902

1st Prime Minister of Australia
- In office 1 January 1901 – 24 September 1903
- Monarchs: Victoria; Edward VII
- Governors-General: Lord Hopetoun; Lord Tennyson
- Preceded by: Office established
- Succeeded by: Alfred Deakin

Justice of the High Court of Australia
- In office 5 October 1903 – 7 January 1920
- Nominated by: Alfred Deakin
- Appointed by: Lord Tennyson
- Preceded by: Office established
- Succeeded by: Hayden Starke
Other political offices
Minister for External Affairs
In office 1 January 1901 – 24 September 1903
Prime Minister	Himself
Succeeded by	Alfred Deakin
Leader of the Opposition in New South Wales
In office 5 October 1898 – 23 August 1899
Premier	George Reid
Preceded by	William Lyne
Succeeded by	William Lyne
Attorney General of New South Wales
In office 23 October 1891 – 14 December 1893
Premier	George Dibbs
Preceded by	George Bowen Simpson
Succeeded by	Charles Heydon
In office 17 January 1889 – 7 March 1889
Premier	George Dibbs
Preceded by	George Bowen Simpson
Succeeded by	George Bowen Simpson
Speaker of the New South Wales Legislative Assembly
In office 3 January 1883 – 31 January 1887
Preceded by	Sir George Wigram Allen
Succeeded by	James Henry Young
Constituencies
Member of the Parliament of Australia for the Division of Hunter
In office 30 March 1901 – 30 September 1903
Preceded by	Constituency established
Succeeded by	Frank Liddell
Member of the New South Wales Legislative Assembly
In office 23 November 1898 – 1 March 1900
Preceded by	Francis Clarke
Succeeded by	Francis Clarke
Constituency	Hastings and Macleay
In office 11 July 1891 – 3 August 1894
Preceded by	Walter Bradley
Succeeded by	Constituency abolished
Constituency	East Sydney
In office 28 December 1882 – 2 March 1887
Preceded by	Arthur Renwick
Succeeded by	William McMillan
Constituency	East Sydney
In office 14 December 1880 – 28 December 1882
Preceded by	John Shepherd
Succeeded by	David Ferguson
Constituency	Wellington
In office 26 August 1879 – 14 December 1880
Preceded by	William Windeyer
Succeeded by	Constituency abolished
Constituency	University of Sydney
Member of the New South Wales Legislative Council
In office 12 May 1897 – 18 July 1898
In office 8 March 1887 – 12 June 1891

Personal details
- Born: 18 January 1849 Glebe, Colony of New South Wales, British Empire (now New South Wales, Australia)
- Died: 7 January 1920 (aged 70) Hydro Majestic Hotel, Medlow Bath, New South Wales, Australia
- Resting place: Waverley Cemetery
- Party: Protectionist (after 1887)
- Spouse: Jane Ross (m. 1877)
- Children: 6
- Education: Sydney Grammar School
- Alma mater: University of Sydney
- Profession: Politician; barrister

Sir Edmund "Toby" Barton (18 January 1849 – 7 January 1920) was the first prime minister of Australia, serving from 1901 to 1903. He held office as the leader of the Protectionist Party, before resigning in 1903 to become a founding justice of the High Court of Australia, on which he served until his death in 1920. Barton is regarded as a founding father of Australia, a principal leader in the federation of the Australian colonies and a drafter of the Commonwealth Constitution.

Barton was an early supporter of the federation of the Australian colonies, the goal of which he summarised as "a nation for a continent, and a continent for a nation". After the retirement of Henry Parkes he came to be seen as the leader of the federation movement in New South Wales. He was a delegate to the constitutional conventions, playing a key role in the drafting of a national constitution, and was one of the lead campaigners for federation in the subsequent referendums. In late 1900, despite the initial "Hopetoun Blunder", Barton was commissioned to form a caretaker government as Australia's first prime minister. His term began on 1 January 1901, the date on which federation occurred.

At the first federal election in March 1901, Barton and the Protectionists won the most seats, but were well short of a majority. He was able to remain as prime minister by forming an alliance with the fledgling Australian Labor Party (ALP), which held the balance of power. The Barton government established a number of new national institutions, including the Australian Defence Force and the Commonwealth Public Service. It introduced nation-wide women's suffrage, and laid the foundations of the White Australia policy with the Immigration Restriction Act 1901.

Barton left politics in 1903 to become one of the three founding members of the High Court, which his government had created. He was succeeded as prime minister by Alfred Deakin. On the court, Barton was able to shape the judicial interpretation of the constitution he had helped write.

== Early life ==
Barton in 1866, aged 17

Edmund Barton was born on 18 January 1849 in Glebe, a suburb of Sydney in the Colony of New South Wales, the eleventh of twelve children born to English parents, Mary Louisa (née Whydah) and William Barton. Barton's parents were both born in London, although his father's family was originally from Devon. They arrived in New South Wales in 1827, and all but two of their children were born in Australia.

Barton's father worked variously as an accountant, bazaar proprietor, stockbroker, and real estate agent. His business ventures were not always successful, and he went bankrupt on one occasion. Edmund had seven sisters and four brothers, including the writer George Burnett Barton. Three of his siblings died during his childhood. (Note: Edmund's younger brother Sydney was born in 1852 but lived only nine months. His older sister Ellen was killed in a fire in 1860, and his oldest brother William Jr. died in 1863.) His given name had not previously been used in the family, and may have been in honour of the recently deceased explorer Edmund Kennedy.

=== Childhood and education ===
Barton spent his early years in Glebe, but in 1851 the family moved into the inner city, living on Cumberland Street in The Rocks. He had a relatively comfortable upbringing, although his father faced financial difficulties on a number of occasions. To support the family during those periods, his mother ran a boarding school for girls. His parents were both highly literate, and his mother in particular "provided much of the direction and encouragement for Edmund's impressive academic achievement". Barton began his formal education at what is now the Fort Street Public School. He later attended Sydney Grammar School, possibly as one of the first students after the school's opening in 1857. One of his close friends in his youth was Richard O'Connor, who would eventually join him on the High Court. Barton was the dux and school captain at Sydney Grammar in 1863 and 1864. He matriculated at the University of Sydney in 1865, aged 16, and was awarded a special prize by the university senate. Barton failed to win one of the three entrance scholarships to the university, owing to "an insufficiency of mathematics".

At university, Barton specialised in classics but also studied English literature, mathematics, physics, and French. He became fluent in Ancient Greek and Latin, and retained a command of both later in life. (Note: In a speech to the Parliament of New South Wales in 1879, Barton quoted Homer in the original Greek. As prime minister in 1902, he met with Pope Leo XIII in Rome and conversed in Latin.) A new professor, Charles Badham, arrived in 1867 and was a "profound influence". Barton won scholarships in his second and third years. He graduated Bachelor of Arts in 1868 with first-class honours, and was awarded the equivalent of the University Medal as well as a prize of £20. He proceeded to Master of Arts by examination in 1870.

=== Sporting activities ===
Barton was a member of the Sydney University Cricket Club and a founding member of the Sydney Rowing Club. On a cricketing trip to Newcastle in 1870 he met Jane Mason Ross, whom he married in 1877.

In 1879, Barton umpired a cricket match at Sydney Cricket Ground between New South Wales and an English touring side captained by Lord Harris. After a controversial decision by Barton's colleague George Coulthard against the home side, the crowd spilled onto the pitch and assaulted some of the English players, leading to international cricket's first riot. In the subsequent public controversy, George Reid censured Coulthard and absolved the crowd, while Barton defended Coulthard and did not spare the crowd. The publicity that attended the young Barton's presence of mind in defusing that situation reputedly helped him take his first step towards becoming Australia's first prime minister, winning a state lower house seat later that year.

== New South Wales politics ==
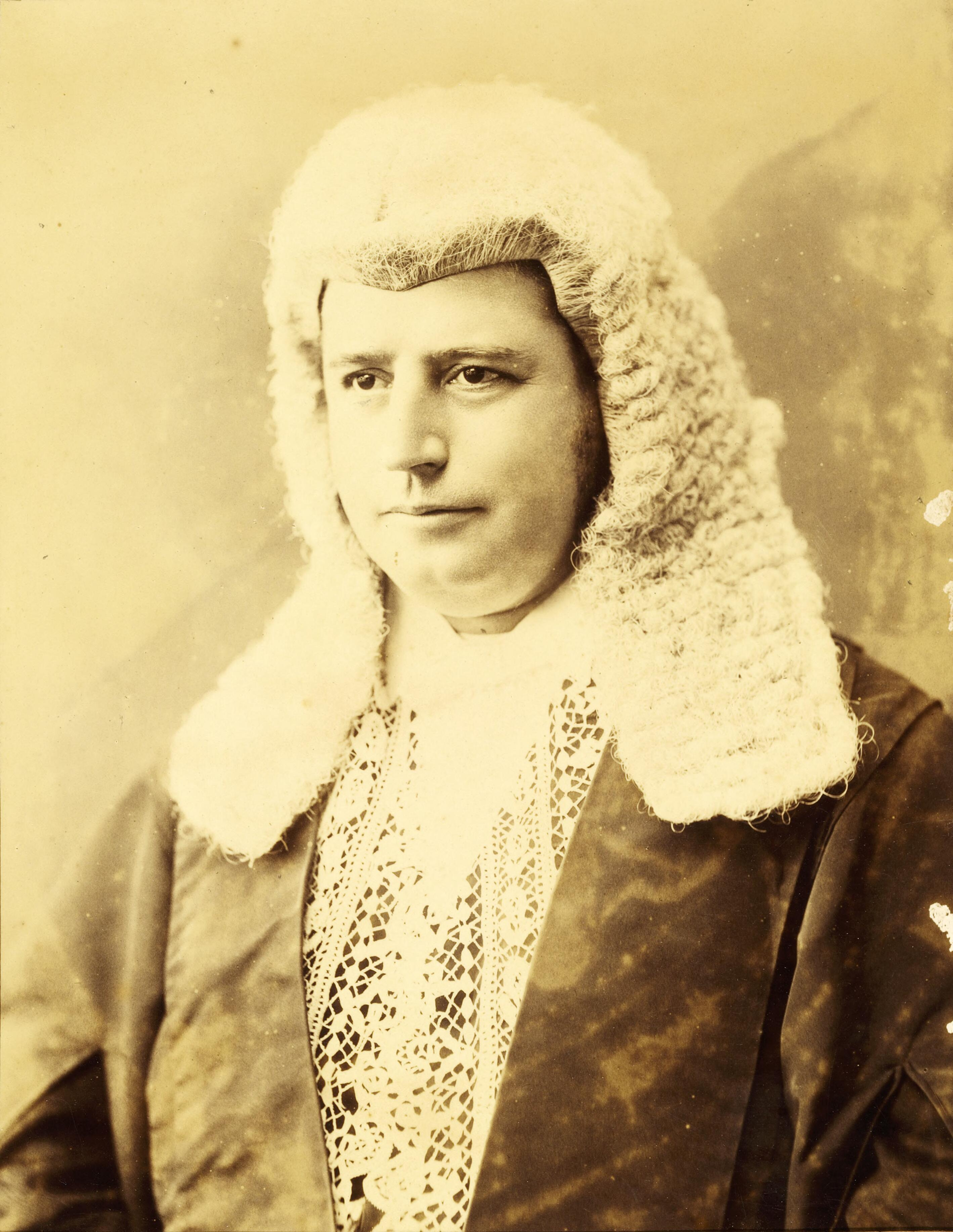
Barton as Speaker of the New South Wales Legislative Assembly

In 1876 Barton stood for the New South Wales Legislative Assembly in the poll of the graduates of the University of Sydney (who were required to wear gowns for the occasion), but was beaten by William Charles Windeyer 49 votes to 43. When Windeyer resigned, Barton won the 1879 by-election. When it was abolished in 1880, he became the member for Wellington, from November 1880 to 1882, and East Sydney, from November 1882 to January 1887. At this stage he considered it "almost unnecessary" to point out his support for free trade.

In 1882, he became Speaker of the New South Wales Legislative Assembly. He was aged only 33, and was the youngest person to have been chosen presiding officer of any Australian legislative chamber. In 1884 he was elected President of the University of Sydney Union. In 1887, he was appointed to the New South Wales Legislative Council at the instigation of Sir Henry Parkes. In January 1889, he agreed to being appointed Attorney General of New South Wales in George Dibbs's Protectionist government, despite his previous support for free trade. This government lasted only until March, when Parkes formed a government again.

== Campaign for federation ==
=== 1891 National Australasian Convention ===
Barton was an early supporter of federation, which became a serious political agenda after Henry Parkes' Tenterfield Oration, and was a delegate to the March 1891 National Australasian Convention. At the convention he made clear his support for the principle that "trade and intercourse ... shall be absolutely free" in a federal Australia. He also advocated that not just the lower house but also the upper house should be representative and that appeals to the Privy Council should be abolished. He also took part in producing a draft constitution, which was substantially similar to the Constitution of Australia enacted in 1900.

Nevertheless, the protectionists were lukewarm supporters of federation and in June 1891, Barton resigned from the council and stood for election to East Sydney and announced that "so long as Protection meant a Ministry of enemies to Federation, they would get no vote from him". He topped the poll and subsequently voted with Parkes, but refused to take a position in his minority government. After the Labor Party withdrew support and the government fell in October 1891, Parkes persuaded him to take over the leadership of the Federal movement in New South Wales.

=== Second Attorney-Generalship ===
Dibbs formed a Protectionist government in New South Wales, and Barton agreed to return to the office of Attorney General, with the right of carrying out private practice as a lawyer. His agreement was based on Dibbs agreeing to support federal resolutions in the coming parliamentary session. His attempt to draft the federal resolutions was delayed by a period as acting Premier of New South Wales, during which he had to deal with the 1892 Broken Hill miners' strike and the carriage of a complex electoral reform bill. He introduced the federal resolutions into the House on 22 November 1892, but was unable to get them considered in committee.

Meanwhile, he began a campaign to spread support for federation to the people with meetings in Corowa and Albury in December 1892. Although he finally managed to get the federal resolutions considered in committee in October 1893, he then could not get them listed for debate by the House. In December, he and Richard O'Connor, the Minister for Justice, were questioned about their agreement to act as private lawyers against the government in Proudfoot v. the Railway Commissioners. While Barton resigned the brief, he lost a motion on the right of ministers to act in their professional capacity as lawyers in actions against the government, and immediately resigned as attorney-general.

In July 1894, Barton stood for re-election for Randwick, since the electorate of East Sydney had been abolished, and lost. He did not stand for election in the 1895 election, very possibly because of financial difficulties. However, he continued to campaign for federation and during the period between January 1893 to February 1897, Barton addressed nearly 300 meetings in New South Wales, including in the Sydney suburb of Ashfield where he declared that "For the first time in history, we have a nation for a continent and a continent for a nation". By March 1897, he was considered "the acknowledged leader of the federal movement in all Australia".

=== Australian Federal Convention and referendum ===
Photo in 1898 of the future 1st prime minister of Australia Edmund Barton aged 49 and 2nd prime minister of Australia Alfred Deakin

In 1897, Barton topped the poll of the delegates elected from New South Wales to the Constitutional Convention, which developed a constitution for the proposed federation. Although Sir Samuel Griffith wrote most of the text of the Constitution, Barton was the political leader who carried it through the convention.

In May 1897, Barton was appointed for the second time to the Legislative Council on Reid's recommendations to take charge of the federation bill in the Upper House. This gave Reid's attorney-general, Jack Want, a free hand to oppose the bill. In September 1897, the convention met in Sydney to consider 286 proposed amendments from the colonies. It finalised its draft constitution in March 1898 and Barton went back to New South Wales to lead the campaign for a yes vote in the June referendum. Although it gained majority support, it achieved only 71,595; 80,000 was the minimum number for it to pass.

In July 1898 Barton resigned from the Upper House to challenge Reid for the seat of Sydney-King in the 1898 general election, but narrowly lost. In September, he won a by-election for Hastings and Macleay and was immediately elected leader of the opposition, which consisted of a mixture of pro-federation and anti-federation protectionists. In January 1899 Reid gained significant concessions from the other states and he joined Barton in campaigning for the second referendum in June 1899, with Barton campaigning all over the state. It passed 107,420 votes to 82,741.

In August 1899 when it became clear that the Labor Party could be manoeuvred into bringing down the Reid government, Barton resigned as leader of the opposition, as he was unacceptable to Labour, and William Lyne took his place. He allegedly refused an offer to become attorney-general again. Barton's Convention colleague, J.T. Walker, wrote at the time, "Barton is not well off financially, and some of his friends (he has many) are trying to help him. They would not be so ready to do so were he to join Lyne". He resigned from Parliament in February 1900 so that he could travel to London with Alfred Deakin and Charles Kingston to explain the federation bill to the Government of the United Kingdom. Around the same time on 15 January 1900 Barton published a 28-page United Australia magazine to disseminate an informative narrative for the propositions of a future Federal Government that he hoped to lead. The British Government was adamant in its opposition to the abolition of appeals to the Privy Council as incorporated in the draft constitution; eventually, Barton agreed that constitutional (inter se) matters would be finalised in the High Court of Australia, but other matters could be appealed to the Privy Council. Edmund was a justice of the High Court for 16 years.

== Prime minister, 1901–1903 ==
=== Appointment ===
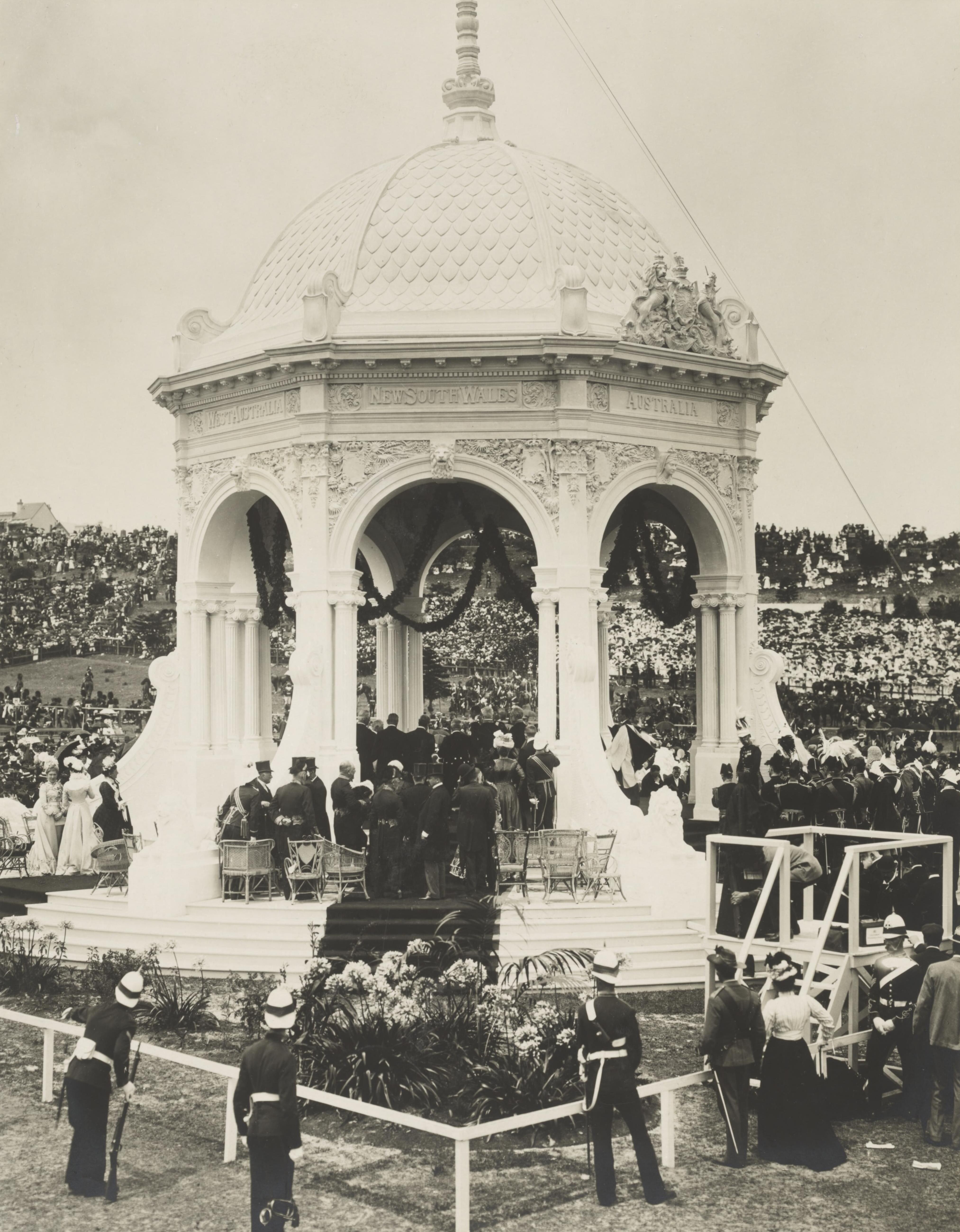
The Federation Pavilion at Centennial Park, Sydney, during the swearing-in ceremony on 1 January 1901 External video Footage from Inauguration of the Commonwealth

Barton was appointed prime minister on 1 January 1901, the day on which the new federal constitution came into effect. He and various other dignitaries were driven through the streets of Sydney in a procession watched by thousands of onlookers, beginning in The Domain and ending at Centennial Park. A swearing-in ceremony for the new government was held at the purpose-built Federation Pavilion. The main focus was on Lord Hopetoun, Australia's first governor-general, who swore three separate oaths and read a message from Queen Victoria. Barton and his ministry only took oaths of allegiance, and were not formally sworn in to the Federal Executive Council until later in the afternoon. The events of the day were captured on film and distributed under the title Inauguration of the Commonwealth, although the visibility of the leading participants is poor. The film has been described as Australia's first feature-length documentary.

Barton had only been commissioned to form a government one week before he became prime minister, due to what became known as the "Hopetoun Blunder". The new governor-general Lord Hopetoun arrived in Australia on 15 December 1900. He was tasked by the Colonial Office with selecting someone to form a caretaker government prior to the first federal election; this individual would be Australia's first prime minister. It was widely assumed that Barton would be offered the position, and he had begun making preparations for the role, including a draft platform for the first federal elections. On 19 December, however, Hopetoun commissioned William Lyne to form a government. His reasons for doing so have been debated, but his decision was widely regarded as a mistake. Lyne, the premier of New South Wales, had actively campaigned against federation, and the leading politicians in each of the other colonies refused to serve under him. On 24 December, he informed Hopetoun that he was unable to form a government and advised him to send for Barton. As a result, the composition of Australia's first cabinet was not formally announced until 30 December, two days before it was sworn in.

=== Caretaker ministry and first election ===
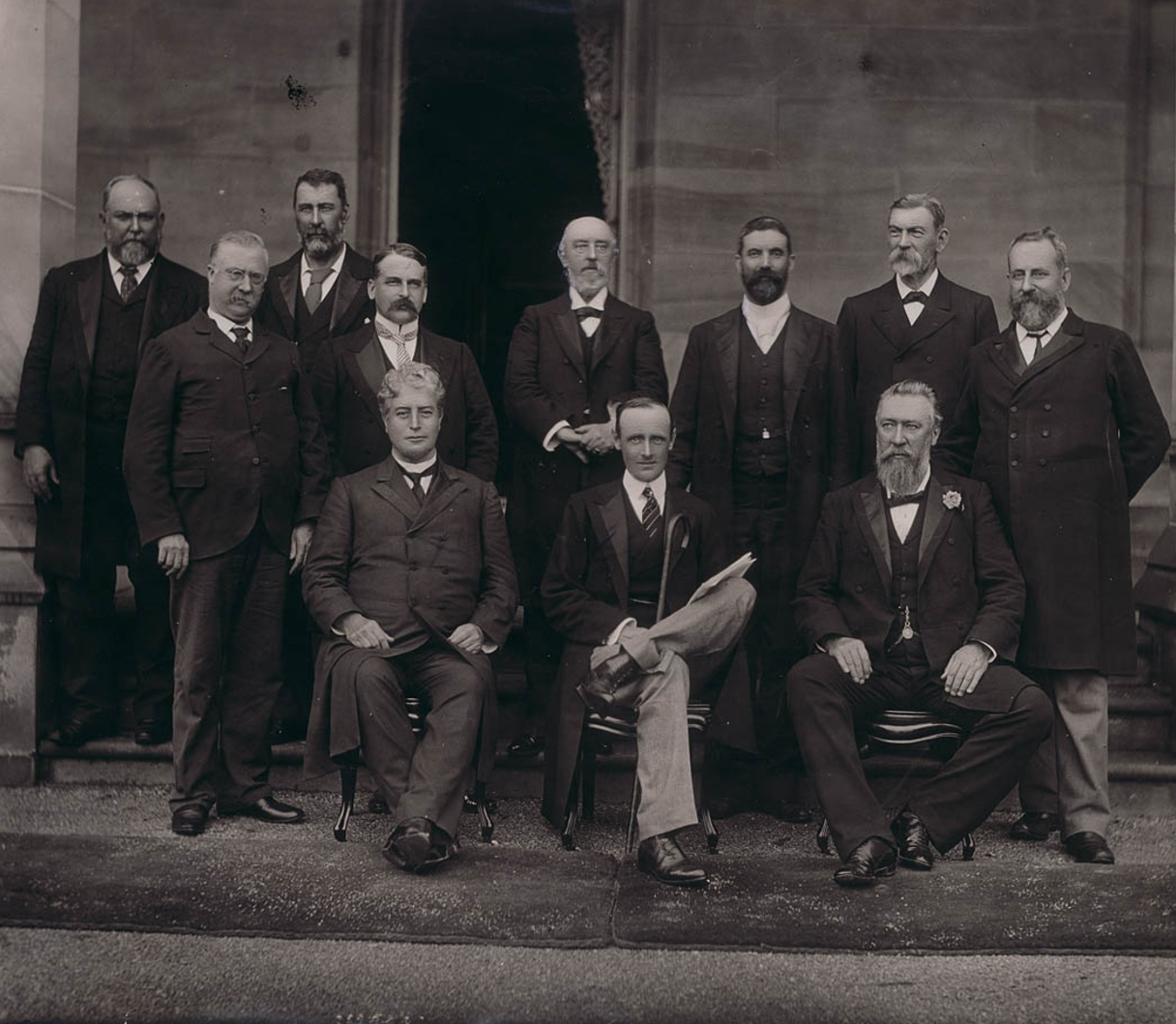
Members of the first Barton ministry, 1 January 1901

Barton assembled a ministry that was described variously as a "cabinet of kings", "orchestra of conductors", and "army of generals". It comprised four incumbent colonial premiers (including Lyne), two former premiers, and Barton's key allies Alfred Deakin and Richard O'Connor. Deakin was ranked second in cabinet after Barton, and O'Connor would become the inaugural Leader of the Government in the Senate. Only one change was made to the ministry prior to the election, necessitated by the death of James Dickson on 10 January. Barton took on the external affairs portfolio himself and conducted official business through the Department of External Affairs, as there was no prime minister's department until 1911.

The first goal for Barton and his ministry was to retain office at the first federal elections, which were held in late March 1901. His old rival George Reid became the chief opponent of the government during the campaign and the de facto opposition leader. There were no national political parties in 1901, but most candidates self-declared as either protectionists or free-traders, following the primary divide in colonial politics. Reid, a free trader, made the tariff issue his primary focus, but its significance was diminished by the fact that the new federal government would have to depend on tariffs for its revenue. Barton instead delivered "an electoral masterstroke" by making White Australia the centrepiece of the government's campaign, thereby attracting many working-class voters concerned about "coloured labour". Supporters of the government won 32 out of the 75 seats in the House of Representatives, with their grouping calling itself the Protectionist Party (or Liberal Protectionists). Barton himself was elected unopposed in the Division of Hunter, having previously represented the area in the New South Wales parliament. The government's continuation was secured by the support of the newly formed Australian Labor Party (ALP), which had 17 MPs. Reid and his Free Trade Party formed the official opposition with 26 MPs. The situation in the Senate was similarly complicated, with the government's position even less secure. However, party discipline was virtually non-existent and Barton was widely seen as having won a mandate to govern.

=== Domestic policy ===
Barton outlined his platform for the first federal election at a speech on 17 January 1901, delivered at the West Maitland Town Hall within his prospective electorate. His plans included the establishment of the federal capital, the High Court and the Inter-State Commission, and a "moderately protectionist tariff" in order to raise the revenue to introduce old-age pensions and a uniform postal system. He also promised to introduce universal suffrage for federal elections, build the Trans-Australian Railway, legislate to allow federal intervention in industrial disputes, and ban immigration from Asia and the Pacific Islands.

In April 1901, Barton announced that the government would sponsor a competition to design a new national flag for Australia. The winning design was the basis for the current Australian national flag, although Barton personally favoured the existing Australian Federation Flag that had been popular in New South Wales for many years. As it was primarily intended to be used in shipping, the design had to be submitted to the British Admiralty for approval and was not officially adopted until 1903.

An early piece of legislation of the Barton government was the Immigration Restriction Act 1901, which put the White Australia policy into law. The Labour Party required legislation to limit immigration from Asia as part of its agreement to support the government, but Barton had promised the introduction of the White Australia Policy in his election campaign. The Immigration Restriction Act was preceded by the introduction of the Pacific Island Labourers Act 1901 which facilitate the mass deportation of 7,500 Pacific Islanders from Australia, and the Post and Telegraph Act 1901 which mandated that only white labour could travel on ships carrying Australian mail.

Barton did not believe in racial equality, and during the introduction of the Immigration Restriction Act stated:

I do not think either that the doctrine of the equality of man was really ever intended to include racial equality. There is no racial equality. There is that basic inequality. These races are, in comparison with white races — I think no one wants convincing of this fact — unequal and inferior. The doctrine of the equality of man was never intended to apply to the equality of the Englishman and the Chinaman.

One notable reform was the introduction of women's suffrage for federal elections in 1902.

Barton was a moderate conservative, and advanced liberals in his party disliked his relaxed attitude to political life. A large, handsome, jovial man, he was fond of long dinners and good wine, and was given the nickname "Toby Tosspot" by The Bulletin.

=== Foreign policy ===
Barton pursued an expansionist policy towards the Pacific Islands, seeking to expand Australian influence and sovereignty over nearby islands including existing British colonies, other European colonies and neutral territories. In February 1901, he stated that Australia's external relations should be directed towards "the question of the occupation, the management and the government of the islands of the Pacific".

In November 1901, Barton secured parliamentary approval for the Australian government to assume control of British New Guinea, whose administration had been funded since 1884 by the colonial governments of New South Wales, Queensland and Victoria. The British government issued letters patent in March 1902 transferring control of the colony to Australia. Barton introduced the Papua (British New Guinea) Bill in July 1903 to establish the Territory of Papua as Australia's first external territory, but it was postponed shortly before his resignation. A permanent administration was not established until the Papua Act 1905 was promulgated in 1906.

Barton envisioned the acquisition of Papua as the first step towards "the creation of a federation in these seas", under Australian control. He had a longstanding interest in the New Hebrides (present-day Vanuatu), where Australian commercial interests competed with those of French settlers. He also publicly expressed interest in Australia taking over the administration of the British Solomon Islands Protectorate. In the New Hebrides, Barton's government established an Australian colony on Espiritu Santo in conjunction with the Burns, Philp & Co., using land previously held by the Australasian New Hebrides Company. The settlement scheme was unsuccessful although the government continued to subsidise Burns, Philp's shipping service as a way of exerting influence in the islands.

Barton acknowledged that Australia's external policy would be subordinate to British interests and stated that "foreign policy belonged to the Empire". Due to existing imperial loyalties and the federal government's limited funding, Australia was reliant on Britain's diplomatic apparatus to implement its external policy. Barton frequently sought to personally influence Imperial policy on matters relevant to Australia. In 1901, he unsuccessfully lobbied the British government to acquire the remote sub-Antarctic Kerguelen Islands from France for strategic purposes. He protested the Imperial government's decision to place the Cook Islands under the control of New Zealand and in 1902 similarly expressed strong opposition towards New Zealand prime minister Richard Seddon's attempts to secure sovereignty over the Colony of Fiji. In 1903 he requested the British government to seek a pre-emptive right to acquire Dutch New Guinea, which was refused by the Dutch government.

=== Overseas tour and defence policy ===
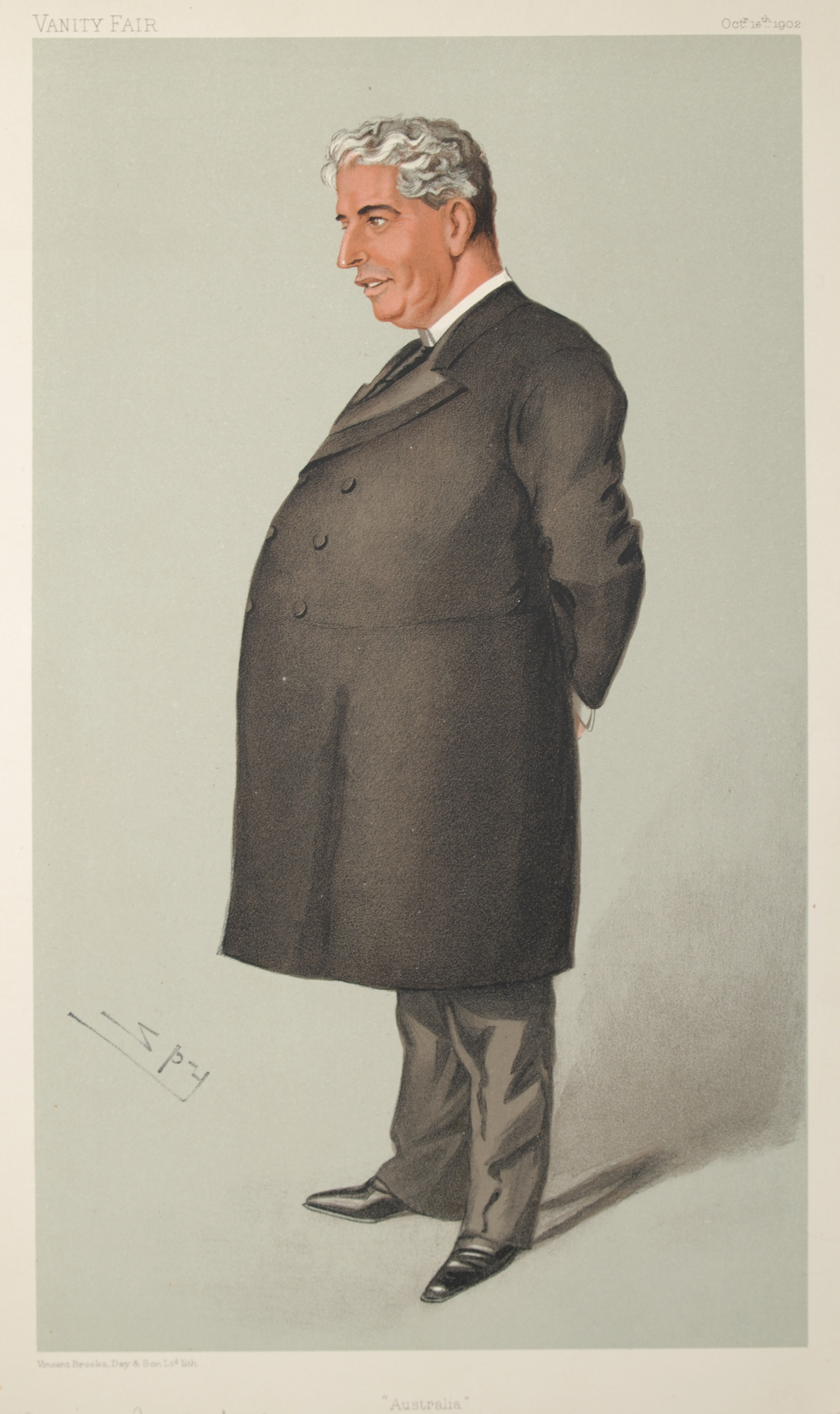
Caricature in Vanity Fair, October 1902

For much of 1902, Barton was in England for the coronation of King Edward VII and the 1902 Colonial Conference. Accompanying him on this trip was Sir John Forrest, Minister for Defence, and the trip was also used to negotiate the replacement of the naval agreements between the Australian colonies and the United Kingdom (under which Australia funded Royal Navy protection from foreign naval threats) by an agreement between the Commonwealth and the United Kingdom at the 1902 Colonial Conference. Deakin disliked this arrangement and discontinued it, moving for a substantial expansion of Australia's own navy in 1908. On their way home from the United Kingdom, Barton and Forrest visited Canada, including Toronto, Ottawa (where they were guests of the governor-general), and the Pacific Coast.

Barton, who was an Anglican, visited the Holy See and met with Pope Leo XIII in July 1902; the two convened in Latin. As anti-Catholic discrimination was highly prevalent in the country, many Australians were outraged by the visit, and a large protest meeting occurred at Sydney Town Hall. Over 30,000 people signed a petition condemning Barton's visit.

=== Retirement ===
On 24 September 1903, Barton resigned as prime minister to become one of the founding justices of the High Court of Australia. Speculation about his political future had been rife for several months, particularly after the Judiciary Act 1903 was passed in August. There were several factors at play in his decision to retire from politics. Some within his own party thought that he lacked the energy and commitment to continue as the leader of the government. Barton had also suffered from bouts of ill health, including a fainting spell in his office earlier in the year. He was advised by his doctor to quit active politics. Finally, he had a history of financial difficulties and appreciated the security that a lifetime appointment would bring. The appointment of the new judges was made by the governor-general on the advice of cabinet, many of whom had ambitions of their own and encouraged Barton to accept the post. His appointment was largely uncontroversial, given his role in drafting the constitution, experience as a barrister, and acceptance of a puisne judgeship rather than the position of chief justice.

== High Court Justice ==
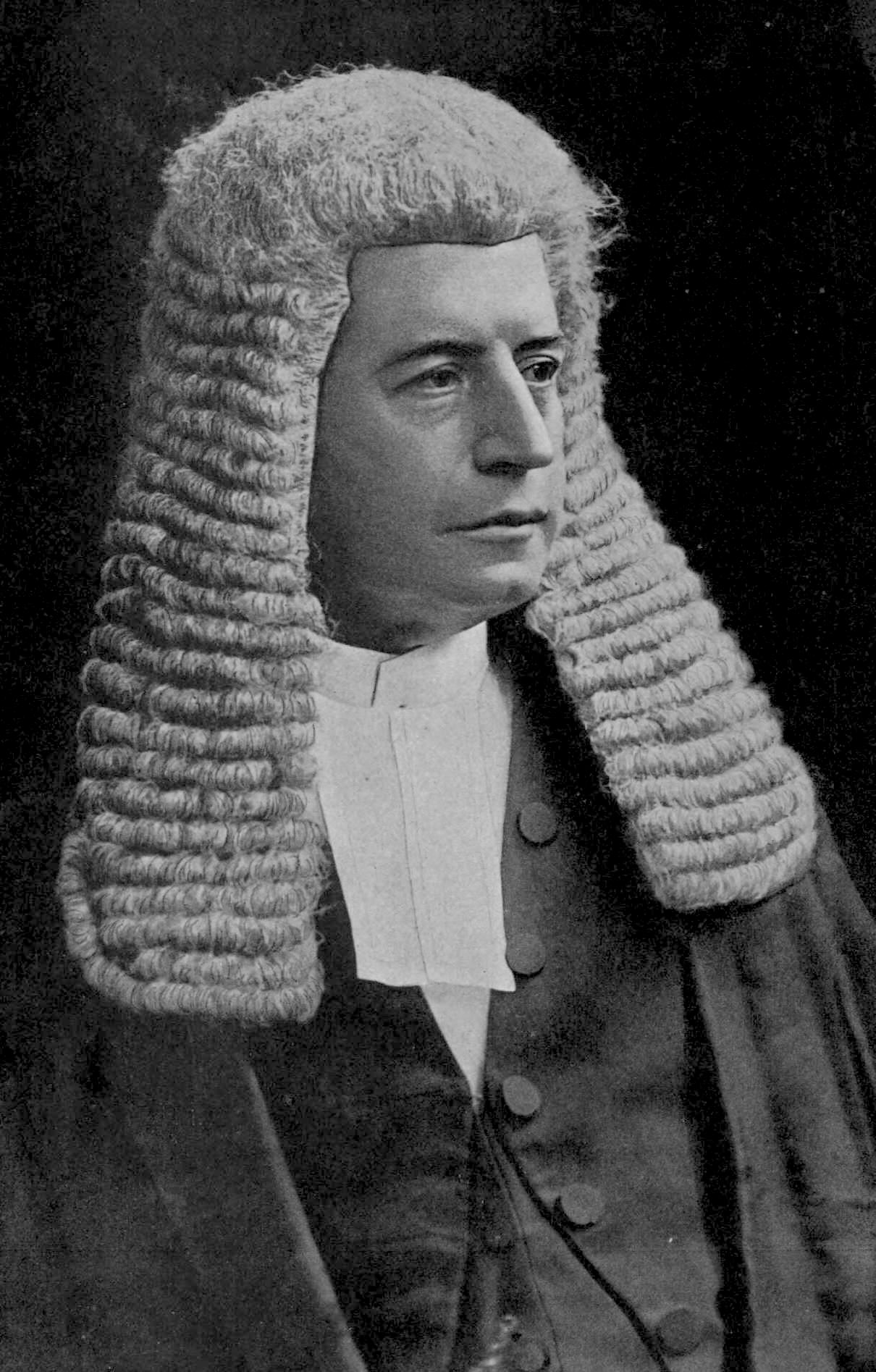
Barton in judicial regalia

Barton was sworn in to the High Court on 7 October 1903, along with his close friends Samuel Griffith and Richard Edward O'Connor; Griffith became the inaugural Chief Justice of Australia. The new justices had worked together in drafting the constitution and habitually lunched together. As a result of their closeness and the small number of cases heard, there were few dissents in the early years of the court.

Deakin succeeded Barton as prime minister, but the government performed poorly at the December 1903 election. The hung parliament allowed Chris Watson and the ALP a chance to form government in April 1904, but it was short-lived and George Reid succeeded Watson as prime minister in August. Later in the year, the court came into conflict with Josiah Symon, Reid's appointee as attorney-general. Symon objected to the judges hearing cases in each of the state capitals, believing the court should sit only in Melbourne and Sydney, and also thought their travelling expenses were excessive. Relations between the government and the court became so strained that the judges contemplated refusing to hear cases, and Barton seriously considered resigning. The situation was only resolved in June 1905 when Deakin returned as prime minister.

=== Court dynamics ===
The Deakin government added two extra judges to the High Court in 1906, appointing former attorneys-general H. B. Higgins and Isaac Isaacs. Their elevation brought an adversarial aspect to the court for the first time, as the new judges were political radicals and had not been involved in drafting the constitution. Barton and Griffith formed a conservative bloc, almost always joined by O'Connor. Barton did not dissent from Griffith in the first eight years of the court's existence. In the 44 cases heard by the court from 1904 to 1905 he delivered only 12 separate judgments, choosing to join Griffith's opinion in every other case. Some writers have taken this as indicative of laziness or reluctance to lead the court. However, others have suggested that his lack of separate judgments was not representative of his work ethic and reflected more a general dislike of concurring opinions as liable to complicate the interpretation of rulings.

Barton was acting chief justice for nine months in 1913, while Griffith was overseas. The same year saw a major shift in the composition of the court, with two new seats created and a third judge appointed to fill the vacancy caused by O'Connor's death. One of the new judges was Barton's friend Albert Piddington, whose appointment proved controversial due to his political views. He resigned from the court after a month, despite Barton's attempts to convince him to stay. The three vacancies were eventually filled by Frank Gavan Duffy, Charles Powers and George Rich, none of whom had been involved in the drafting of the constitution. As a result, Barton and Griffith increasingly found themselves in a minority on constitutional matters, seeking to preserve the intentions of the framers rather than allow the constitution to evolve. The new judges were also less familiar with the North American federal precedents that the original judges had often relied upon. The influx of new voices contributed to Barton's movement away from Griffith, as he showed "a return of energy and initiative [...] greater independence and at times disagreement" than in his earliest years on the court.

=== Notable cases ===
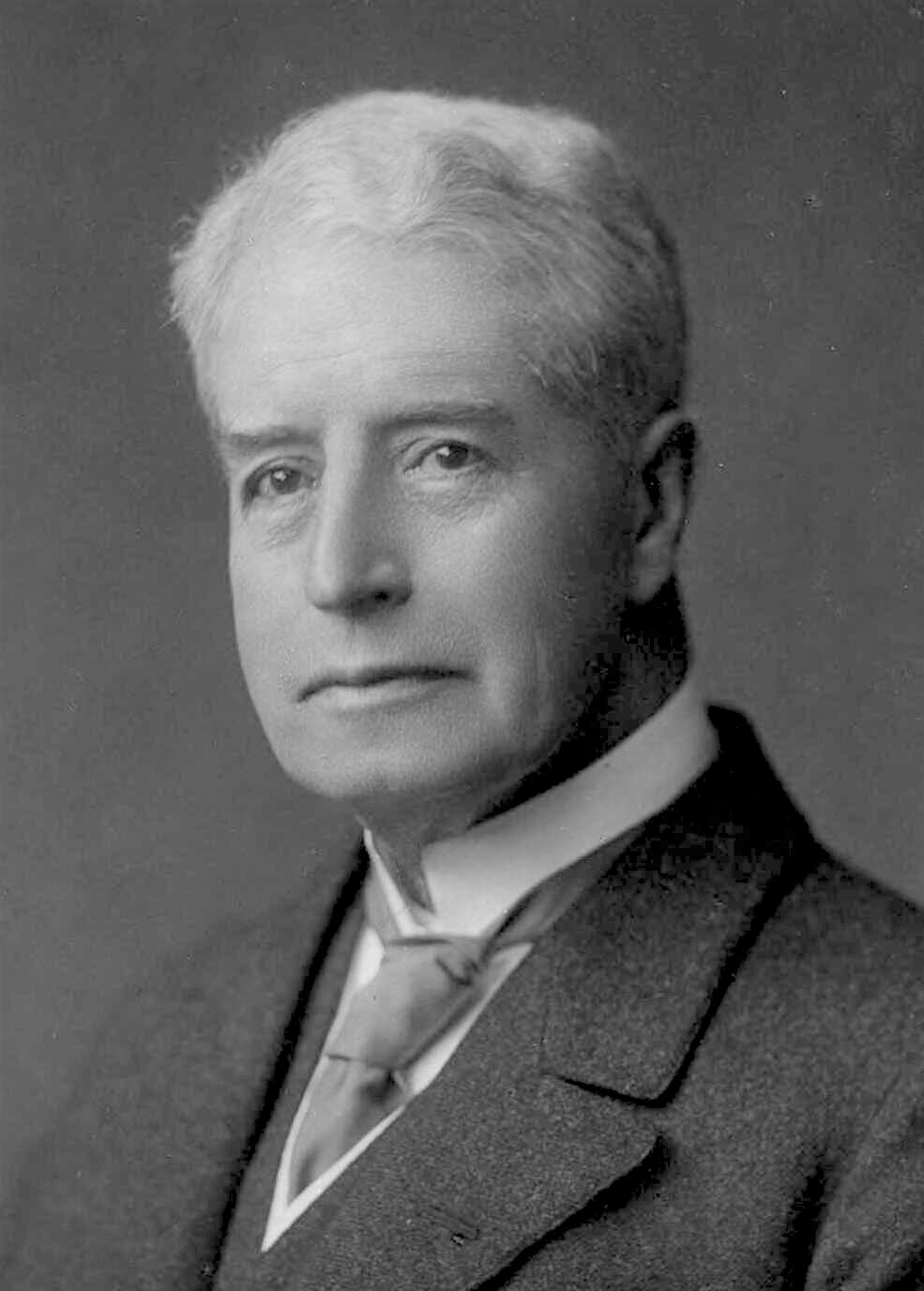
Barton later in life

In D'Emden v Pedder (1904), the High Court formulated a doctrine of implied immunity of instrumentalities, modelled closely on the American concept of intergovernmental immunity which Barton and the other authors of the constitution had closely studied. The court followed this precedent in Deakin v Webb (1904), which was subsequently overturned by the Judicial Committee of the Privy Council in Webb v Outtrim (1906). Barton was angered by the Privy Council's intervention, having always believed the High Court should be the final court of appeal. In personal correspondence he described the 83-year-old presiding judge Lord Halsbury as an "old pig" who did not understand the needs of a federation.

Sitting as the Court of Disputed Returns, Barton was the sole judge in Blundell v Vardon (1907), where he ruled that Joseph Vardon's election to the Senate was void due to electoral irregularities. He joined with Griffith and O'Connor in the majority opinion in R v Barger (1908), "the High Court's most decisive intervention to date in thwarting social reforms passed by the Commonwealth parliament". In a series of cases around the same time, the trio also restricted the powers of the Commonwealth Court of Conciliation and Arbitration. Barton and Griffith split notably in New South Wales v Commonwealth (1915), with the court voting 4–2 to strip the Inter-State Commission of any judicial power, much to Barton's dismay. Only Gavan Duffy sided with his argument that parliament should determine the commission's powers rather than the court. The decision was "a rebuff to Barton's authority as an interpreter of the Constitution and his special authority as one of its draftsman".

During World War I, Barton joined the majority in Farey v Burvett (1915), which saw the court adopt a broad view of the federal government's defence power. In Duncan v Queensland (1916), he and Isaacs were the only dissenters from the court's interpretation of section 92 of the constitution. With Griffith authoring the majority opinion, the court held that state governments could circumvent the constitution's free-trade provisions simply by banning the movement of goods across state boundaries. Barton expressed a "heavy sorrow" at the court's decision and Isaacs was highly critical. In 1920, after Barton's death, Isaacs led the court in reversing Duncan, in what became known as the Engineers' case.

=== Other activities and final years ===
Along with Griffith, Barton was several times consulted by governors-general of Australia on the exercise of the reserve powers. In 1919, although ill, he was extremely disappointed to be passed over for the position of Chief Justice on the retirement of Griffith.

== Death and family ==
Barton died on 7 January 1920 from heart failure at the Hydro Majestic Hotel, Medlow Bath, New South Wales. He was interred in South Head General Cemetery in the Sydney suburb of Vaucluse (see Waverley Cemetery). He was survived by his wife and six children:

- Edmund Alfred (29 May 1879 – 13 November 1949), a New South Wales judge
- Wilfrid Alexander (1880–1953), first NSW Rhodes Scholar (1904)
- Jean Alice (1882–1957), married Sir David Maughan (1873–1955) in 1909
- Arnold Hubert (3 January 1884 – 1948), married Jane Hungerford in Sydney 1907; he later emigrated to Canada
- Oswald (8 January 1888 – 6 February 1956), medical doctor
- Leila Stephanie (1892–1976), married Robert Christopher Churchill Scot Skirving, son of Sydney doctor Robert Scot Skirving, in London 1915

Barton's nephews via his older sister Harriet included Victorian federal MP Arthur Robinson and businessmen Lionel and William Sydney Robinson.

== Honours ==
Barton refused knighthoods in 1887, 1891 and 1899, but agreed to be appointed a Knight Grand Cross of the Order of St Michael and St George (GCMG) in the 1902 Coronation Honours list published on 26 June 1902, and was invested by King Edward VII at Buckingham Palace on 8 August 1902. (He was the only prime minister to be knighted during his term of office until Robert Menzies in 1963; various others were knighted after leaving the office; Sir Earle Page was already a knight when he briefly became prime minister in 1939.) He received an honorary Doctor of Laws (LL.D.) from the University of Cambridge in 1900, and honorary Doctor of Civil Law from the University of Oxford and LL.D. from the University of Edinburgh while visiting the United Kingdom in the summer of 1902. He also received the Freedom of the City of Edinburgh during a visit to that city on 26 July 1902.

In 1905, the Japanese government conferred the Grand Cordon, Order of the Rising Sun, and Barton was granted permission to retain and wear the insignia. The honour was presented in acknowledgement of his personal role in resolving a conflict concerning the Commonwealth's Pacific Island Labourers Act and the Queensland protocol to the Anglo-Japanese Treaty.

In 1951 and again in 1969, Barton was honoured on postage stamps bearing his portrait issued by Australia Post.

The Barton Highway near Canberra, Australia was named after Barton. The Division of Barton in New South Wales is named after him, as is Barton, Australian Capital Territory, a suburb of Canberra close to Capital Hill which is the location of many government departments and national institutions, and the headquarters of Australia's main political parties. The Edmund Barton Building is a government office building in that suburb. The Barton College of Deakin University is also named after Barton.

Grave of Sir Edmund & Lady Barton

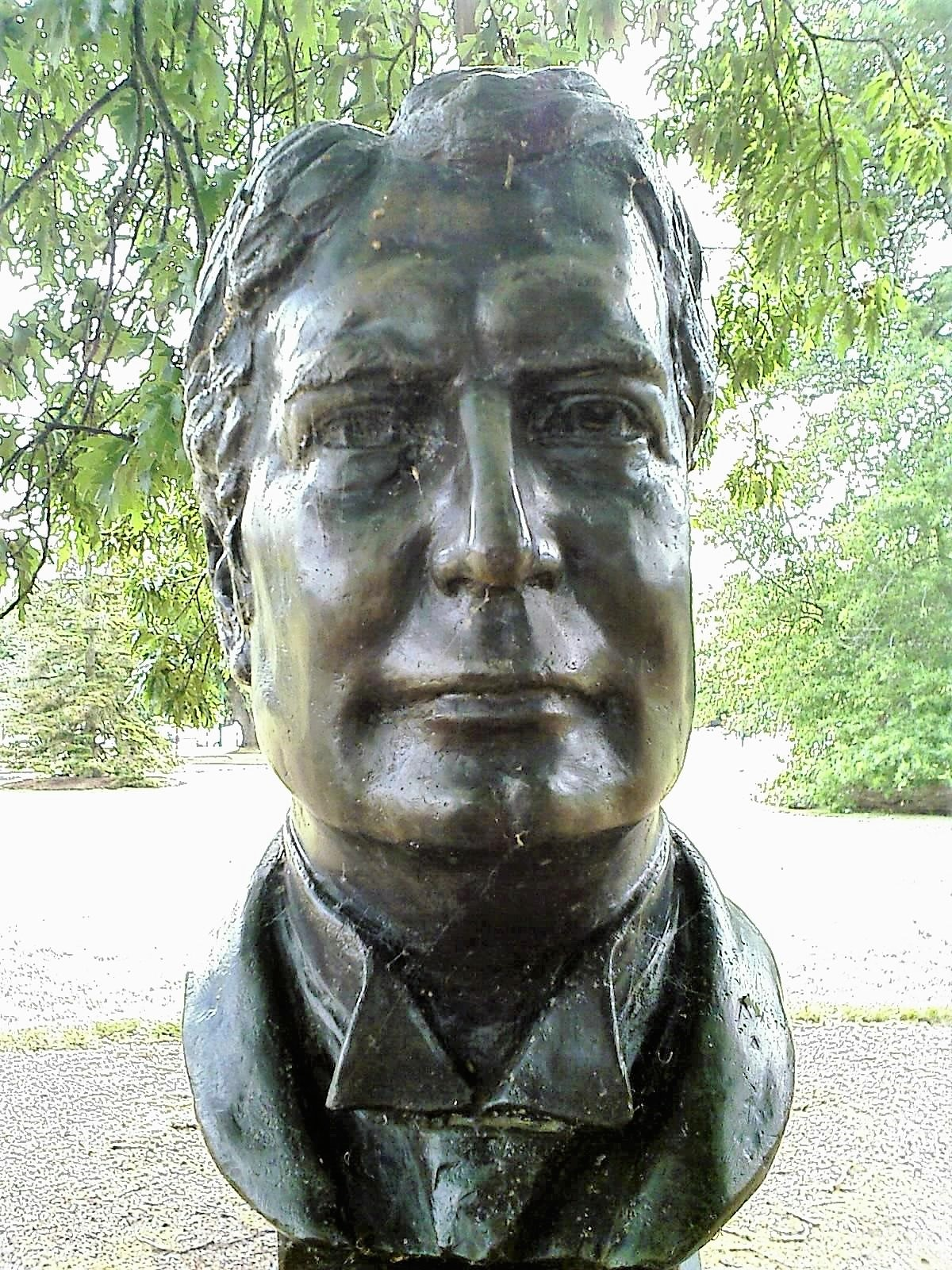
Bust of Sir Edmund Barton in the Prime Ministers Avenue in the Ballarat Botanical Gardens

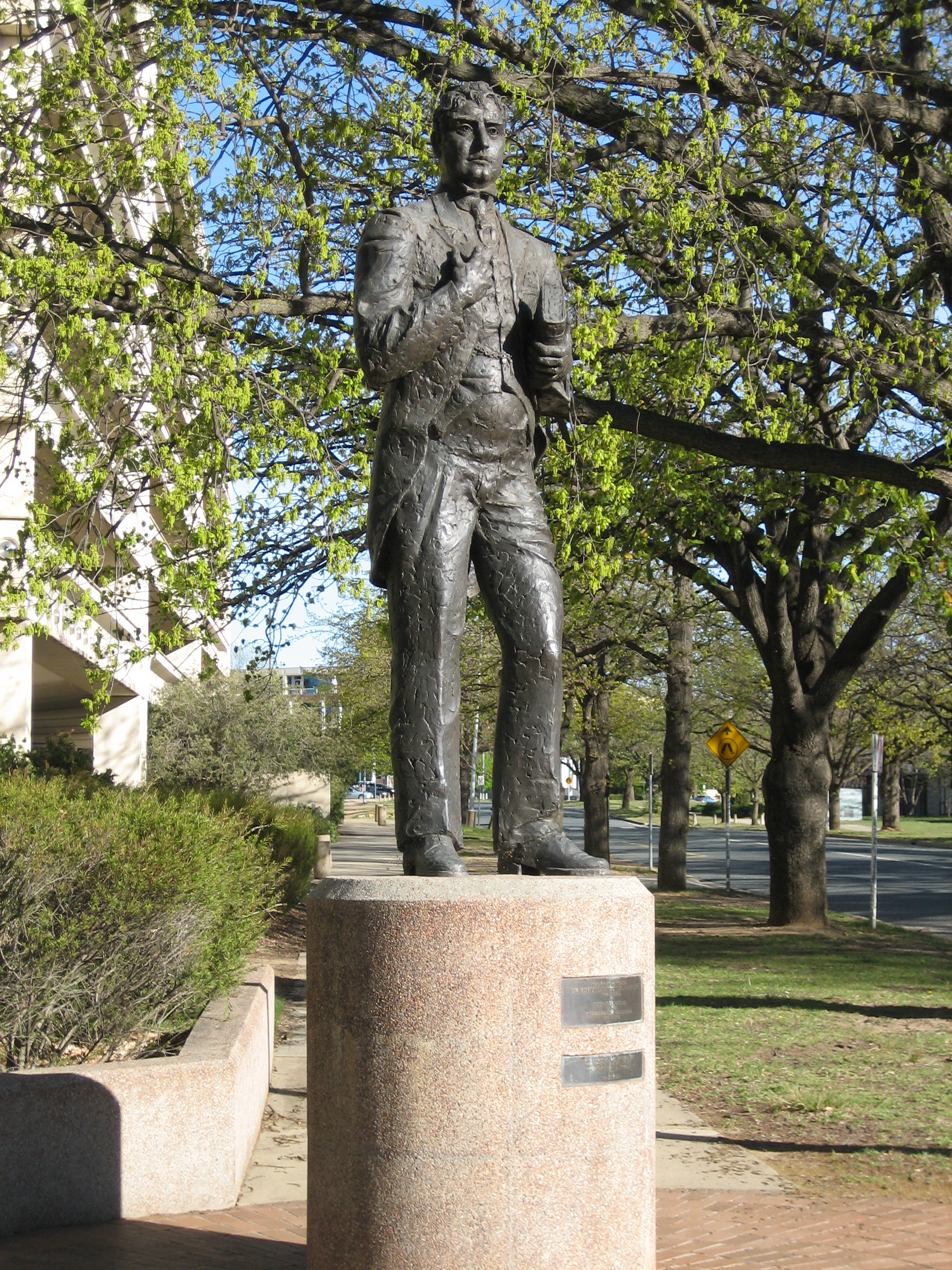
Sir Edmund Barton Memorial in Barton, Australian Capital Territory

== Notes ==
New South Wales Legislative Assembly
Preceded by William Windeyer	Member for University of Sydney; 1879–1880	District abolished
Preceded by John Shepherd	Member for Wellington; 1880–1882	
Preceded by Arthur Renwick	Member for East Sydney; 1882–1887; Served alongside: Reid, Burdekin, McElhone, Copeland, Griffiths	Succeeded by William McMillan
Preceded by Sydney Burdekin	Member for East Sydney; 1891–1894; Served alongside: McMillan, Parkes, Reid	District abolished
Preceded by Francis Clarke	Member for Hastings and Macleay; 1898–1900	Succeeded by Francis Clarke
Preceded by Sir George Wigram Allen	Speaker of the New South Wales Legislative Assembly; 1883–1887	Succeeded by James Young
Political offices
Preceded by Julian Salomons	Representative of the Government in the Legislative Council; 1889	Succeeded by William Suttor Jr.
Preceded by Sir George Bowen Simpson	Attorney General of New South Wales; 1889	Succeeded by Sir George Bowen Simpson
Preceded by Sir George Bowen Simpson	Attorney General of New South Wales; 1891–1893	Succeeded by Charles Heydon
Party political offices
New political party	Leader of the Protectionist Party; 1889–1903	Succeeded by Alfred Deakin
Parliament of Australia
New division	Member for Hunter; 1901–1903	Succeeded by Frank Liddell
Political offices
New title	Prime Minister of Australia; 1901–1903	Succeeded by Alfred Deakin
New title	Minister for External Affairs; 1901–1903	Succeeded by Alfred Deakin
Legal offices
New title	Justice of the High Court of Australia; 1903–1920	Succeeded by Sir Hayden Starke
