= Maitland Town Hall =

Town hall in New South Wales, Australia

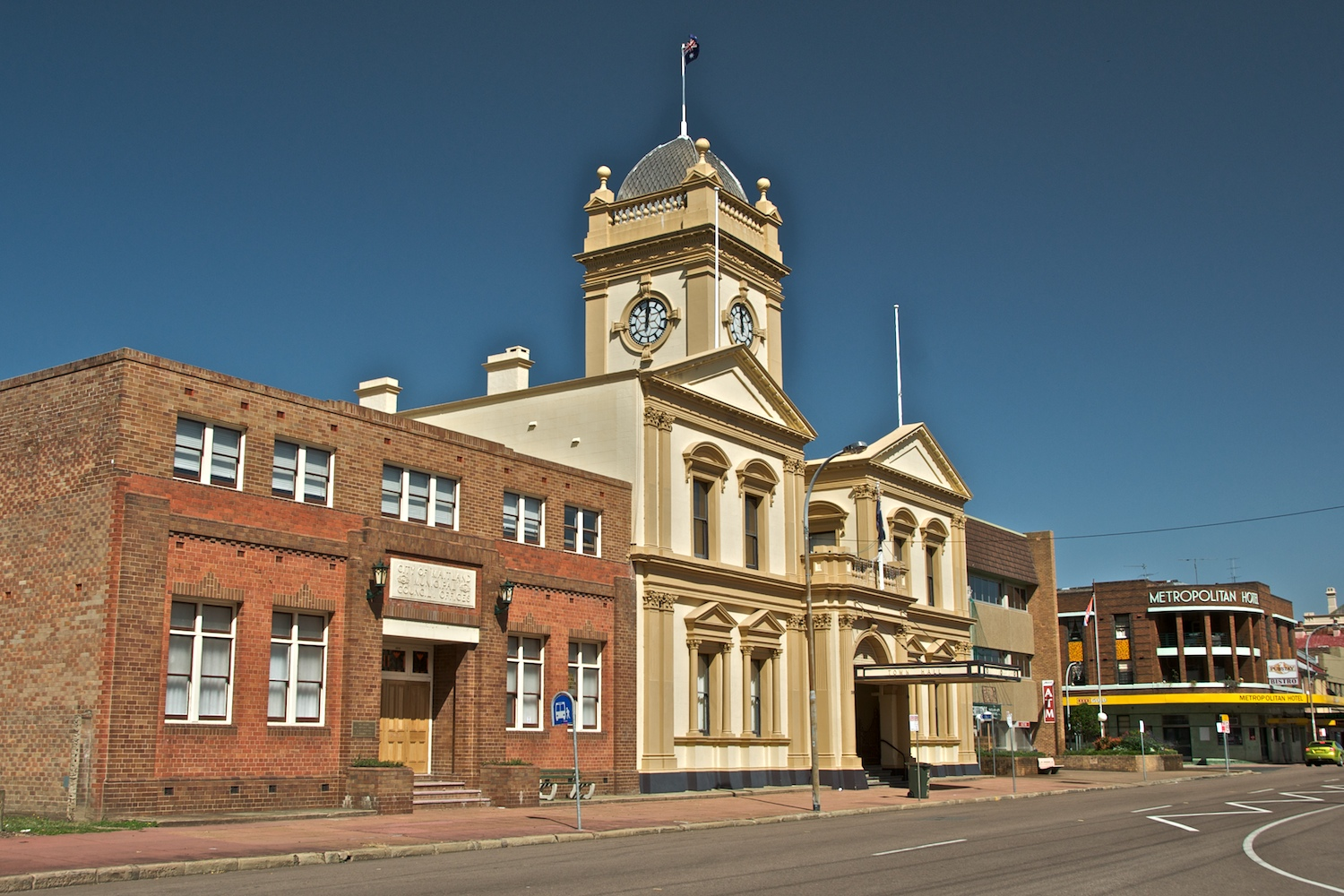

- Location within New South Wales Location within Australia
- 32.7376°S 151.5606°E
- Location: High Street, Maitland, City of Maitland, New South Wales, Australia

Site notes
- Owner: Maitland City Council

New South Wales Heritage Register
- Official name: Maitland Town Hall & adj Office Building & Supper Room
- Type: state heritage (built)
- Designated: 2 April 1999
- Reference no.: 183
- Type: Hall Town Hall
- Category: Community Facilities

Maitland Town Hall (historically known as the West Maitland Town Hall) is a heritage-listed town hall at High Street, Maitland, City of Maitland, New South Wales, Australia. It was built in 1888–90. The property is owned by Maitland City Council. It was added to the New South Wales State Heritage Register on 2 April 1999.

== History ==
The town hall project was initiated by the then-West Maitland Borough Council. The foundation stone for the town hall was laid on 26 January 1888, and it formally opened on 28 February 1890. It was designed by local architects Lee and Scobie, who beat out prominent local architect John W. Pender in a design competition, and built by Henry Noad. The total cost of the building, including lighting and furnishings, came to "nearly £7000".

Australia's first prime minister, Edmund Barton, opened his government's campaign for the inaugural 1901 federal election at the West Maitland Town Hall on 17 January 1901. He was elected unopposed to the Division of Hunter, which included Maitland.

The building underwent major extensions in 1934 at a cost of £10,000. It included new offices, a new supper room/small dance hall, new larger stage in the auditorium and new dressing rooms. Part of the extension was funded by loans from the Unemployment Relief Council as a Great Depression relief measure.

It underwent a $2 million refurbishment in 2015-16, including lighting, audiovisual and air conditioning upgrades, stage rigging replacement, acoustic wall treatments, preservation works to the original sprung floor and painting the auditorium interior.

In 2021 construction commenced on upgrades to the town hall as part of the new administration centre to the eastern side of the building. Works planned as part of the upgrades include new back stage change rooms, new bathrooms, a new hallway between the supper room and main hall, upgrades to supper hall and kitchen, and a new loading dock to the southern side of the building. Construction is expected to be completed in late 2022.

== Description ==
The building is designed in the Victorian Classical style. It features a symmetrical facade with a central tower and Corinthian columns supporting pediments over the ground floor windows, with elaborate classical detail in Corinthian pilasters, string courses and pediments.

The City of Maitland describes it as a "good example of Victorian civic architecture in Classical style", an "important landmark in High Street and contributor to the unique townscape of Central Maitland".

== Heritage listing ==
Maitland Town Hall is significant within New South Wales as a representative of nineteenth-century civic centres with grand architectural forms. This town hall's Victorian Architecture is impressive in its High Street streetscape and intact state. The tower makes the town hall a local landmark and reinforces the role of High Street as the dominant thoroughfare of the town. The town hall is the best example of its type within the Upper Hunter region, and comparable to other regional town halls of the 1880s Boom period. It is of regional significance for demonstrating the growth, prosperity and regional importance of West Maitland from the 1880s. The continuation of the original council chamber functions provides evidence for the civic stability of Maitland and has associations with key events and people in Maitland's municipal history. The town hall has important associations with the cultural life of West Maitland and wider region as a venue for performers and focal point for community events.

Maitland Town Hall was listed on the New South Wales State Heritage Register on 2 April 1999.
