= 1898–1900 Australian constitutional referendums =

Referendums held in Australia

A series of referendums on the proposed constitution of Australia were held between 2 June 1898 and 31 July 1900 in the six colonies that were to become the states of the Commonwealth of Australia. The first four referendums were held in New South Wales, South Australia, Tasmania and Victoria in June 1898. Although all four saw a majority vote in favour, the majority in New South Wales was insufficient. Knowledge of the result in New South Wales led to low voter turnout in South Australia.

Following a series of amendments made to the proposed constitution at the Secret Premiers meeting on 31 January and 1 February 1899, a second referendum was required in the four states, whilst on 2 September, Queensland held a referendum on the constitution for the first time. All five states saw a majority vote in favour.

Three weeks after the Commonwealth of Australia Constitution Act became law in 1900, Western Australia held a referendum on the constitution, which was also approved. The constitution came into force on 1 January 1901.

== Background ==
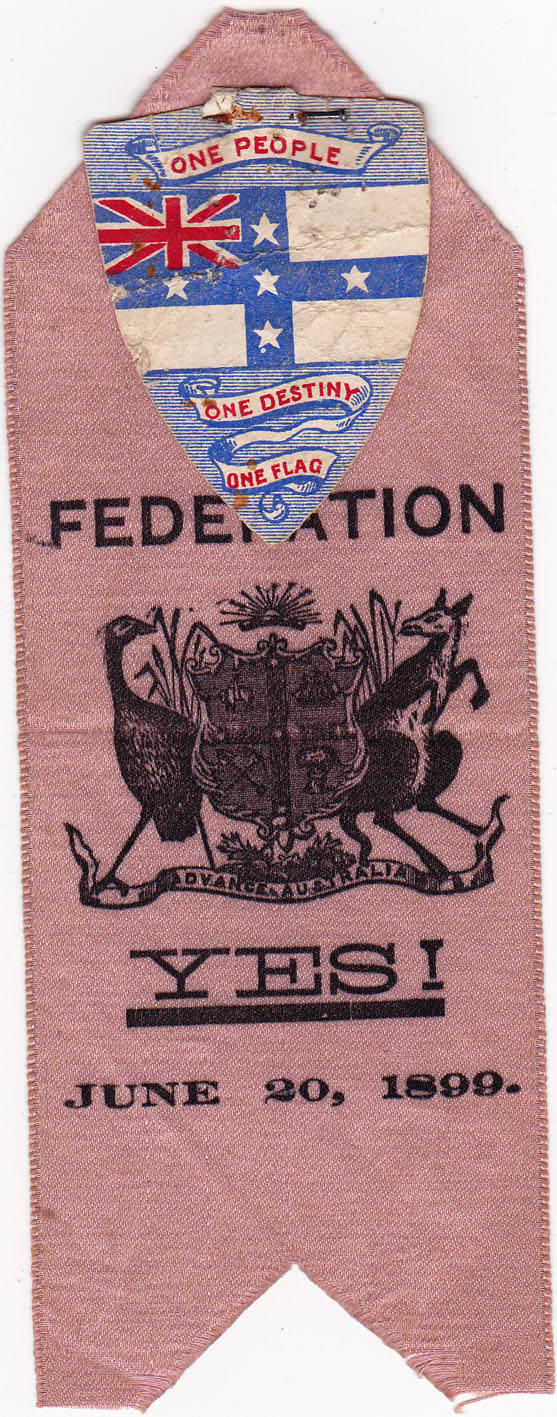
A ribbon produced in Sydney

Following the National Australasian Convention in 1891, support for federalism reduced in the face of opposition from George Reid and the sudden advent of the Labor Party in NSW, which commonly dismissed federation as a "fad". However, a subsequent revival of the federal movement owed much to the growth of federal leagues outside of capital cities, and, in Victoria, the Australian Natives' Association. The Border Federation League of Corowa held a conference in 1893 which was to prove of considerable significance, and a "People's Convention" in Bathurst in 1896 underlined the cautious conversion of George Reid to the federal cause. At the close of the Corowa Conference John Quick had advanced a scheme of a popularly elected convention, tasked to prepare a constitution, which would then be put to a referendum in each colony. Winning the support of George Reid, the new premier of NSW, the Quick scheme was approved by all premiers in 1895. (Quick and Robert Garran later published The Annotated Constitution of the Australian Commonwealth in 1901, which is widely regarded as one of the most authoritative works on the Australian Constitution.) The election of delegates took place in March 1897, and several weeks later the Convention gathered for its first session in Adelaide, later meeting in Sydney, and finally in Melbourne in March 1898. After the Adelaide meeting, the colonial Parliaments took the opportunity to debate the emerging Bill and to suggest changes. The basic principles of the 1891 draft constitution were adopted, modified by a consensus for more democracy in the constitutional structure. It was agreed that the Senate should be chosen, directly, by popular vote, rather than appointed by State governments.

On other matters there was considerable disagreement. 'Interests' inevitably fractured the unity of delegates in matters involving rivers and railways, producing legalistic compromises. And they had few guides, at a conceptual level, to what they were doing. Deakin greatly praised James Bryce's sage appreciation of American federalism, The American Commonwealth. And Barton cited the analysis of federation of Bryce's Oxford colleagues, E.A. Freeman and A.V. Dicey. But neither of these two writers could be said to be actual advocates of Federation. And for delegates less given to reading (or citing) authors, the great model of plural governance was always the British Empire, which, obviously was no federation at all.

The Australasian Federal Convention dissolved on 17 March 1898 having adopted a bill "To Constitute the Commonwealth of Australia". Referendums on the proposed constitution were held in four of the colonies in June 1898. There were majority votes in all four, however, the enabling legislation in New South Wales required the support of at least 80,000 voters for passage, equivalent to about half of enrolled voters, and this number was not reached. A meeting of the colonial premiers in early 1899 agreed to a number of amendments to make the constitution more acceptable to New South Wales. These included the limiting "Braddon Clause", which guaranteed the states 75 percent of customs revenue, to just ten years of operation; requiring that the new federal capital would be located within New South Wales, but at least a hundred miles (160 km) distant from Sydney; and, in the circumstances of a "double dissolution", reducing from six tenths to one half the requisite majority to legislate of a subsequent joint meeting of Senate and House. In June 1899, referendums on the revised constitution were again held again in all the colonies except for Western Australia, where the vote was not held until the following year. The majority vote was "yes" in all the colonies.

=== South Australia ===
Residents of South Australia were staunchly opposed to federation in the mid-19th century due to the dominance of the colonies of Victoria and New South Wales in issues such as trade and tariffs, as well as a desire to keep unique elements of South Australia intact. The mood had shifted by the 1890s, with what was seen as the looming inevitability of federation a motivator to negotiating a good deal for the less populous colonies, with the argument by the Yes campaign that they may never have such favourable terms again. The No campaign however focused on the potential for increased costs for South Australians, as well as decreased land values.

== Results ==
=== 1898 referendums ===
Results by colony of the 1898 referendums

State	Date	For		Against		Turnout	
State	Date	Vote	%	Vote	%	Vote	%
Tasmania	3 June 1898	11,797	81.29	2,716	18.71	14,513	25.0
New South Wales (Note: The enabling legislation in New South Wales required a minimum of 80,000 votes in support.)	4 June 1898	71,595	51.95	66,228	48.05	137,823	43.5
South Australia	4 June 1898	35,800	67.39	17,320	32.61	53,120	30.9
Victoria	4 June 1898	100,520	81.98	22,099	18.02	122,619	50.3
Source: Federation Fact Sheet 1 – The Referendums 1898–1900, AEC

=== 1899 and 1900 referendums ===
Results by colony of the 1899–1900 referendums

Western Australia referendum result by colonial electoral division

State	Date	For		Against		Turnout	
State	Date	Vote	%	Vote	%	Vote	%
South Australia	29 April 1899	65,990	79.46	17,053	20.54	83,043	54.4
New South Wales	28 June 1899	107,420	56.49	82,741	43.51	190,161	63.4
Tasmania	27 July 1899	13,437	94.40	797	5.60	14,234	41.8
Victoria	27 July 1899	152,653	93.96	9,805	6.04	162,458	56.3
Queensland	28 September 1899	38,488	55.39	30,996	44.61	69,484	54.4
Western Australia	31 July 1900	44,800	69.47	19,691	30.53	64,491	67.1
Source: Federation Fact Sheet 1 – The Referendums 1898–1900, AEC
