= Electoral district of University of Sydney =

Former state electoral district of New South Wales, Australia

University of Sydney was an electoral district of the Legislative Assembly in the Australian state of New South Wales from 1876 to 1880. It was established in the 1858 redistribution to be elected by graduates of the University of Sydney once there were 100 eligible electors.

Under the Electoral Act 1858, the University of Sydney was entitled to a seat in the Legislative Assembly, elected by graduates, once there was a body of 100 graduates. The university petitioned the Governor in 1876 for the creation of a seat, listing the names of 10 Doctors of Law, 9 Doctors of Medicine and 92 Masters of Arts who were living in the colony. The Chancellor and Returning Officer Edward Deas Thomson published a notice for the election, with polling taking place in the ante-room adjoining the Great Hall. Underneath, Registrar Hugh Kennedy published the following note. 'As it appears that there is no legal necessity for members of the University who take part in the Election of a Representative to appear in academic costume, they will not be required to do so; but they are requested, if they conveniently can, to comply with the customary practice on such occasions.' Oddly, the next day the notice had been amended to say academic costume was 'required'.

== Members for University of Sydney ==
Member	Party	Period
William Windeyer	None	1876–1879
Edmund Barton	None	1879–1880

== Election results ==
1879 University of Sydney by-election Tuesday 26 August
Candidate	Votes	%
Edmund Barton (elected)	58	60.4
Arthur Renwick	38	39.6
Total formal votes	96	100.0
Informal votes	0	0.0
Turnout	96	56.8

William Windeyer resigned.
