= List of New South Wales Legislative Council by-elections (1845–1856) =

Between 1843 and 1856 the New South Wales Legislative Council was a hybrid in which some members of the Council were elected and the balance were appointed by the Governor. A by-election was held for the when an elected member's seat became vacant through resignation, death or some other reason. In 1856 the unicameral Legislative Council was abolished and replaced with an elected Legislative Assembly and an appointed Legislative Council.

== 1843–1848 ==
District	Incumbent	Reason	Date	Winner
Town of Melbourne	Henry Condell	Resignation	14 March 1844	Joseph Robinson
Port Phillip	Charles Ebden & Alexander Thomson	Resignations	23 April 1844	Adolphus Young & Sir Thomas Mitchell
Port Phillip	Sir Thomas Mitchell	Resignation.	17 September 1844 (Note: Unopposed)	Benjamin Boyd
County of Camden	Roger Therry	Resigned, appointed to the Supreme Court (Port Phillip).	27 February 1845	John Benton Wild
Counties of St Vincent and Auckland	John Coghill	Resigned to travel to England.	19 April 1845	Robert Lowe
Port Phillip	Thomas Walker	Resignation	7 August 1845	Maurice O'Connell Jr.
Port Phillip	Adolphus Young	Resignation	7 August 1845	Thomas Boyd
Northumberland Boroughs	D'Arcy Wentworth	Resigned	16 September 1845	Patrick Grant
Port Phillip	Benjamin Boyd	Resignation	26 September 1845	Edward Curr
Northumberland Boroughs	Patrick Grant	Election void (property qualification)	22 November 1845	Patrick Grant
County of Northumberland	William Foster	Resigned	27 October 1845	Henry Dangar
Port Phillip	Thomas Boyd	Resignation	23 January 1846	Edward Brewster
Port Phillip	Edward Curr	Resignation	29 June 1846	John Foster
County of Argyle	William Bradley	Resigned	24 July 1846	William Faithfull
Port Phillip	John Lang	Vacated by absence	22 December 1847	John Airey
County of Durham	Richard Windeyer	Died in December 1847.	19 February 1848	Stuart Donaldson
Port Phillip	Edward Brewster	Resignation	15 March 1848	Charles Ebden
== 1848–1851 ==
By-election	Incumbent	Reason	Date	Winner
Port Phillip	James Williamson	Resigned	27 February 1849	William Macarthur
County of Cumberland	Nelson Lawson	Died February 1849.	March 1849	Robert Fitzgerald
Counties of St Vincent and Auckland	George Hill	Resigned	20 June 1849	Daniel Cooper
Counties of Cook and Westmoreland	James Martin	Election void (property qualification)	20 June 1849	James Martin
Port Phillip	Edward Curr	Resigned	23 June 1849	John Foster
County of Durham	Stuart Donaldson	Election void.	25 June 1849	Stuart Donaldson
Port Phillip	James Palmer	Resigned	17 July 1849	Henry Moor
City of Sydney	Robert Lowe	Resigned	18 December 1849	William Bland
County of Cumberland	Charles Cowper	Resigned	13 March 1850	James Byrnes
Port Phillip	John Foster & Lauchlan Mackinnon	Resigned	11 June 1850	Charles Ebden & William Mercer
City of Sydney	William Bland	Resigned	24 July 1850	John Lang
Counties of Gloucester, Macquarie, and Stanley	Kenneth Snodgrass	Resigned	25 October 1850	Richard Jones
Town of Melbourne	Earl Grey	Vacated by absence (Note: Earl Grey was the Colonial Secretary in London and there was no suggestion he met the property requirement for election. He was nominated and elected as part of the campaign for independence, protesting against government by New South Wales. As Earl Grey had never set foot in the colony, he did not attend the Legislative Council and his seat was vacated by his absence on 31 October 1850.)	7 November 1850	William Westgarth
== 1851–1856 ==
By-election	Incumbent	Reason	Date	Winner
City of Sydney	John Lang	Resigned	18 November 1851	Robert Campbell
Stanley Boroughs	Richard Jones	Died in November 1852.	January 1853	Henry Russell
County of Durham	Stuart Donaldson	Resigned	28 February 1853	Alexander Park
Pastoral Districts of Moreton, Wide Bay, Burnett, and Maranoa	Francis Bigge	Resigned	3 March 1853	Richard Smith
City of Sydney	John Lamb	Resigned	10 March 1853	William Thurlow
Cumberland Boroughs	John Holden	Resigned	22 April 1853	William Bowman
Pastoral Districts of Wellington and Bligh	James Bettington	Resigned	27 April 1853	Charles Finch
Pastoral District of Maneroo	Arthur Jeffreys	Resigned	19 April 1854	Daniel Egan
County of Stanley	John Richardson	Resigned	28 April and 23 May 1854	Arthur Hodgson
City of Sydney	William Wentworth	Resigned	2 May 1854	Henry Parkes
County of Stanley	Arthur Hodgson	Election void	10 August 1854	John Lang
Roxburgh and Wellington	William Suttor Sr.	Resigned	23 October 1854	Saul Samuel
City of Sydney	William Thurlow	Resigned	24 January 1855	James Wilshire
Sydney Hamlets	Thomas Smart	Resigned to travel to England	21 February 1855	Stuart Donaldson
Pastoral Districts of Lachlan and Lower Darling	William Macarthur	Resigned	2 March 1855	William Macleay
Counties of Murray and St Vincent	Alick Osborne	Resigned	19 March 1855	Daniel Cooper
Clarence and Darling Downs	George Leslie	Resigned	21 April 1855	Thomas Hood
Pastoral Districts of New England and Macleay	Matthew Marsh	Resigned to return to England	26 April 1855	Robert Massie
Pastoral Districts of New England and Macleay	Robert Massie	Election void	27 August 1855	Thomas Rusden
Stanley Boroughs	Henry Russell	Resigned	10 September 1855	John Richardson
