= Members of the New South Wales Legislative Council, 1843–1851 =

This is a list of members of the New South Wales Legislative Council from 1843 to 1851. The 1843 Electoral Act prescribed 36 members, 24 to be elected, 6 appointed by virtue of their office (Colonial Secretary, Colonial Treasurer, Auditor-General, Attorney General, Commander of the forces and Collector of Customs) and 6 nominated. The appointments and elections were for five year terms and thus occurred in 1843, and 1848. The Speaker was Alexander Macleay until 19 May 1846 and then Charles Nicholson. The parliament was dissolved on 30 June 1851 as a result of the 1851 Electoral Act which increased the number of members in the Council to 54 (18 to be appointed and 36 elected).

Name	Appointed or District	Years in office
John Airey (Note: John Lang was absent for two successive sessions of the Council, his seat was declared vacant in November 1847 and John Airey was elected unopposed to replace him.)	Port Phillip	1847–1848
George Allen (Note: John Blaxland resigned in July 1845 and George Allen was appointed to replace him.)	Appointed	1845–1856
George Barney (Note: George Barney resigned in August 1843 and John Plunkett was appointed to replace him.)	Appointed (Colonial Engineer)	1843; 1851–1856
Alexander Berry	Appointed	1843–1856
William Bland (Note: Robert Lowe resigned in November 1849 and William Bland was elected to replace him.) (Note: William Bland resigned in June 1850 and John Lang was elected to replace him.)	City of Sydney	1843–1848; 1849–1850; 1858–1861
John Blaxland	Appointed	1829–1844
William Bowman	Cumberland Boroughs	1843–1851; 1853–1856
Benjamin Boyd (Note: Sir Thomas Mitchell resigned in August 1844 and Benjamin Boyd was elected to replace him.) (Note: Benjamin Boyd resigned in August 1845 and Edward Curr was elected to replace him.)	Port Phillip	1844–1845
Thomas Boyd (Note: Adolphus Young resigned in July 1845 and Thomas Boyd was elected to replace him.) (Note: Thomas Boyd resigned in December 1845 and Edward Brewster was elected unopposed to replace him.)	Port Phillip	1845
William Bradley (Note: William Bradley resigned in July 1846 and William Faithfull was elected to replace him.)	County of Argyle	1843–1846; 1851–1856
Edward Brewster (Note: Edward Brewster resigned in February 1848 and Charles Ebden was elected unopposed to replace him.)	Port Phillip	1846–1848
James Byrnes (Note: Charles Cowper resigned in February 1850 and James Byrnes was elected to replace him.)	County of Cumberland	1850–1851
John Coghill (Note: John Coghill resigned in March 1845 and Robert Lowe was elected to replace him.)	Counties of St Vincent and Auckland	1843–1845
Henry Condell (Note: Henry Condell resigned in February 1844 and Joseph Robinson was elected to replace him.)	Town of Melbourne	1843–1844
Daniel Cooper (Note: George Hill resigned in May 1849 and Daniel Cooper was elected to replace him.)	Counties of St Vincent and Auckland	1849–1851; 1855–1856
Charles Cowper	County of Cumberland	1843–1850; 1851–1856; 1860
Edward Curr (Note: Edward Curr resigned in May 1846 and John Foster was elected unopposed to replace him.;)	Port Phillip	1845–1846; 1848–1849
Henry Dangar (Note: William Foster resigned in October 1845 and Henry Dangar was elected to replace him.)	County of Northumberland	1845–1851
John Darvall (Note: Hastings Elwin resigned in July 1844 and John Darvall was appointed to replace him.)	Appointed; County of Bathurst	1844–1856
John Dickson	Port Phillip	1848–1851; 1856–1859
Stuart Donaldson (Note: Richard Windeyer died in December 1847 and Stuart Donaldson was elected to replace him.;)	County of Durham	1848–1853; 1855–1856
William Dumaresq	Counties of Hunter, Brisbane and Bligh	1843–1848; 1851–1856
Charles Ebden (Note: Charles Ebden and Alexander Thomson resigned in March 1844 and Adolphus Young and Sir Thomas Mitchell were elected to replace them.) (Note: Lauchlan Mackinnon and John Foster resigned in May 1850 and Charles Ebden and William Mercer were elected to replace them.)	Port Phillip	1843–1844; 1848; 1850–1851
Hastings Elwin	Appointed	1843–1844
William Faithfull	County of Argyle	1846–1848
Robert Fitzgerald (Note: Nelson Lawson died in February 1849 and Robert Fitzgerald was elected to replace him.)	County of Cumberland	1849–1856; 1856–1865
John Foster	Port Phillip	1846–1848; 1849–1850
William Foster	County of Northumberland	1843–1845
John Gibbes	Appointed (Collector of Customs)	1843–1855
Patrick Grant (Note: D'Arcy Wentworth resigned in July 1845 and Patrick Grant was elected to replace him. Grant's election was declared void as he did not meet the property qualification, however he was re-elected unopposed.)	Northumberland Boroughs	1845–1848
Earl Grey (Note: Earl Grey was the Colonial Secretary in London had never set foot in the colony and there was no suggestion he met the property requirement for election. He was nominated and elected as part of the campaign for independence, protesting against government by New South Wales. As he did not attend the Legislative Council his seat was vacated on 31 October 1850 and William Westgarth was elected to replace him.)	City of Melbourne	1848–1850
Edward Hamilton (Note: Edward Hamilton resigned in May 1846 and Henry Parker was appointed to replace him.) (Note: Edward Hamilton resigned in May 1850 and Phillip King was appointed to replace him.)	Appointed	1843–1846; 1848–1850
George Hill	Counties of St Vincent and Auckland	1848–1849; 1856–1861
Thomas Icely	Appointed	1843–1853; 1855–1856; 1864–1874
Richard Jones (Note: Richard Jones resigned on 1 November 1843 and Robert Lowe was appointed to replace him.) (Note: Kenneth Snodgrass resigned in September 1850 and Richard Jones was elected to replace him.)	Appointed; Counties of Gloucester, Macquarie, and Stanley	1829–1843; 1850–1852
Phillip King	Appointed	1839; 1850–1851; 1851–1856
John Lamb (Note: Robert Lowe resigned in September 1844 and John Lamb was appointed to replace him.)	Appointed	1844–1851; 1851–1853; 1857–1861
John Lang	Port Phillip; City of Sydney	1843–1847; 1850–1851; 1854–1856
Nelson Lawson	County of Cumberland	1848–1849
William Lawson	County of Cumberland	1843–1848
William Lithgow	Appointed (Auditor-General)	1829–1852
Francis Lord	County of Bathurst	1843–1848; 1856–1861; 1864–1893
Robert Lowe	Appointed; Counties of St Vincent and Auckland; City of Sydney	1843–1844; 1845–1849
Hannibal Macarthur	Town of Parramatta	1830–1848
James Macarthur	County of Camden	1839–1843; 1848–1856; 1866–1867
William Macarthur (Note: James Williamson resigned in January 1849 and William Macarthur was elected to replace him.)	Port Phillip	1849–1855; 1864–1882
Lauchlan Mackinnon	Port Phillip	1848–1850
Alexander Macleay (Note: Alexander Macleay died on 19 June 1848 however he was not replaced as the Council was dissolved on 30 June 1848.)	Counties of Gloucester, Macquarie, and Stanley	1825–1836; 1843–1848
James Martin	Counties of Cook and Westmoreland	1848–1856
Donald McIntyre	Counties of Hunter, Brisbane and Bligh	1848–1851
William Mercer	Port Phillip	1850–1851
Thomas Mitchell	Port Phillip	1844
Henry Moor (Note: James Palmer resigned in May 1849 and Henry Moor was elected unopposed to replace him.)	Port Phillip	1849–1851
Terence Murray	Counties of Murray, King and Georgiana	1843–1856
Bob Nichols	Northumberland Boroughs	1848–1856
Charles Nicholson	Port Phillip; County of Argyle	1843–1856
Maurice O'Connell Jr. (Note: Thomas Walker resigned in July 1845 and Maurice O'Connell Jr. was elected to replace him.)	Port Phillip	1845–1848
Maurice O'Connell Sr.	Appointed (Commander of the forces)	1838–1848
George Oakes	Town of Parramatta	1848–1856; 1879–1881
James Palmer	Port Phillip	1848–1849
John Panton	Counties of Cook and Westmoreland	1843–1848
Henry Parker	Appointed	1846–1856
John Plunkett	Appointed (Attorney General)	1836–1841; 1843–1856; 1857–58; 1861–69
Campbell Riddell	Appointed (Colonial Treasurer)	1843–1858
Joseph Robinson	Town of Melbourne	1844–1848
Kenneth Snodgrass	Counties of Gloucester, Macquarie, and Stanley	1848–1850
William Suttor Sr.	Counties of Roxburgh, Phillip and Wellington	1843–1854
Roger Therry (Note: Roger Therry resigned in February 1845 as he had been appointed a judge of the Supreme Court for the District of Port Phillip and John Wild was elected to replace him.)	County of Camden	1841–1845; 1856–1859
Alexander Thomson	Port Phillip	1843–1844
Edward Thomson	Appointed (Colonial Secretary)	1837–1854; 1856–1879
Thomas Walker	Port Phillip	1843–1845
D'Arcy Wentworth	Northumberland Boroughs	1843–1845
William Wentworth	City of Sydney	1843–1854; 1861–1862
William Westgarth	City of Melbourne	1850–1851
John Wild	County of Camden	1845–1848
James Williamson	Port Phillip	1848–1849
Richard Windeyer	County of Durham	1843–1847
Edward Wynyard	Appointed (Commander of the forces)	1848–1851
Adolphus Young	Port Phillip	1844–1845

== See also ==
- Results of the 1843 and 1848 elections
