= President of the Queensland Legislative Council =

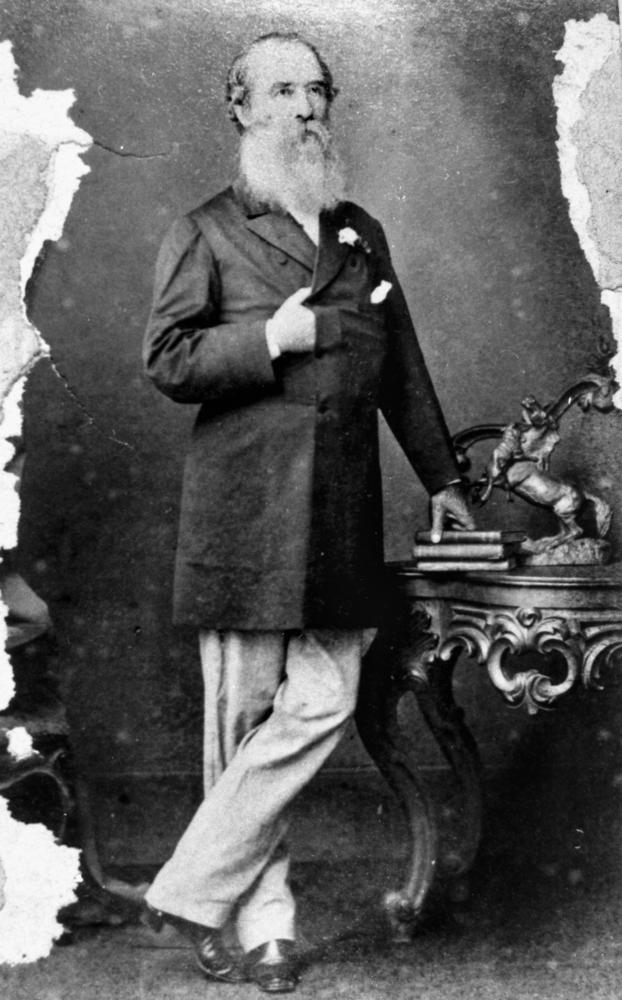
Sir Maurice Charles O'Connell

The President of the Queensland Legislative Council, also known as the Presiding Officer of the Council, was the presiding officer of the Queensland Legislative Council, the upper house of the Parliament of Queensland from 1860 until 1922 and analogous to the President of the Australian Senate.

== Role of the president ==
The President was a Member of the Queensland Legislative Council, and was the ceremonial head of that Council. The President therefore performed ceremonial duties, and represented the Council to other organisations. In conjunction with the Speaker of the Legislative Assembly of Queensland, the President was responsible for the administration of the Parliament of Queensland. When the Council was sitting, the President enforced procedures, maintained order and put questions after debate. The President also made decisions and formal rulings with regards to the chamber's standing orders.

The President was appointed by the Governor of Queensland on recommendation from the Government. It was not seen as a political role.

== List of presidents of the Legislative Council ==
The presidents of the Queensland Legislative Council were:

President	Term in office
Charles Nicholson	22 May 1860 – 26 Aug 1860
Maurice Charles O'Connell	26 Aug 1860 – 23 Mar 1879
Joshua Peter Bell	3 Apr 1879 – 20 Dec 1881
Arthur Hunter Palmer	24 Dec 1881 – 20 Mar 1898
Hugh Nelson	13 Apr 1898 – 1 Jan 1906
Arthur Morgan	19 Jan 1906 – 19 Dec 1916
William Hamilton	15 Feb 1917 – 27 Jul 1920
William Lennon	18 Aug 1920 – 23 Mar 1922
