= The Colonist (Australian newspaper) =

Australian periodical

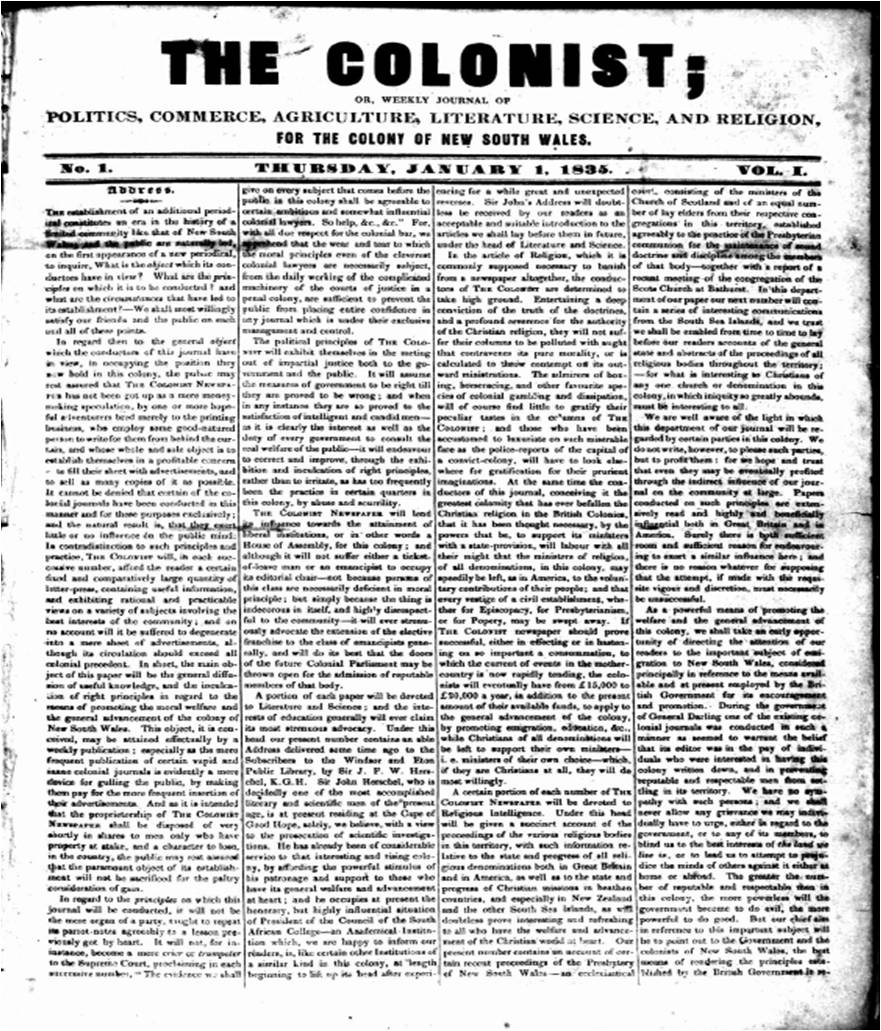
The Colonist, 1 January 1835

The Colonist was a weekly English-language tabloid newspaper published in Sydney from 1835 to 1840.

== History ==
The Colonist was founded by John Dunmore Lang with a religious and political agenda. First published on 1 January 1835 by Henry Bull and J. Spilsbury, The Colonist was published from 1835 until 1840, after which it was absorbed by the Sydney Herald.

== Digitisation ==
The paper has been digitised as part of the Australian Newspapers Digitisation Program project of the National Library of Australia.

== See also ==
- List of newspapers in Australia
- List of defunct newspapers of Australia
- List of newspapers in New South Wales
