= Electoral district of Northumberland Boroughs (NSW Legislative Council) =

Former New South Wales Legislative Council electoral district

Northumberland Boroughs New South Wales—Legislative Council
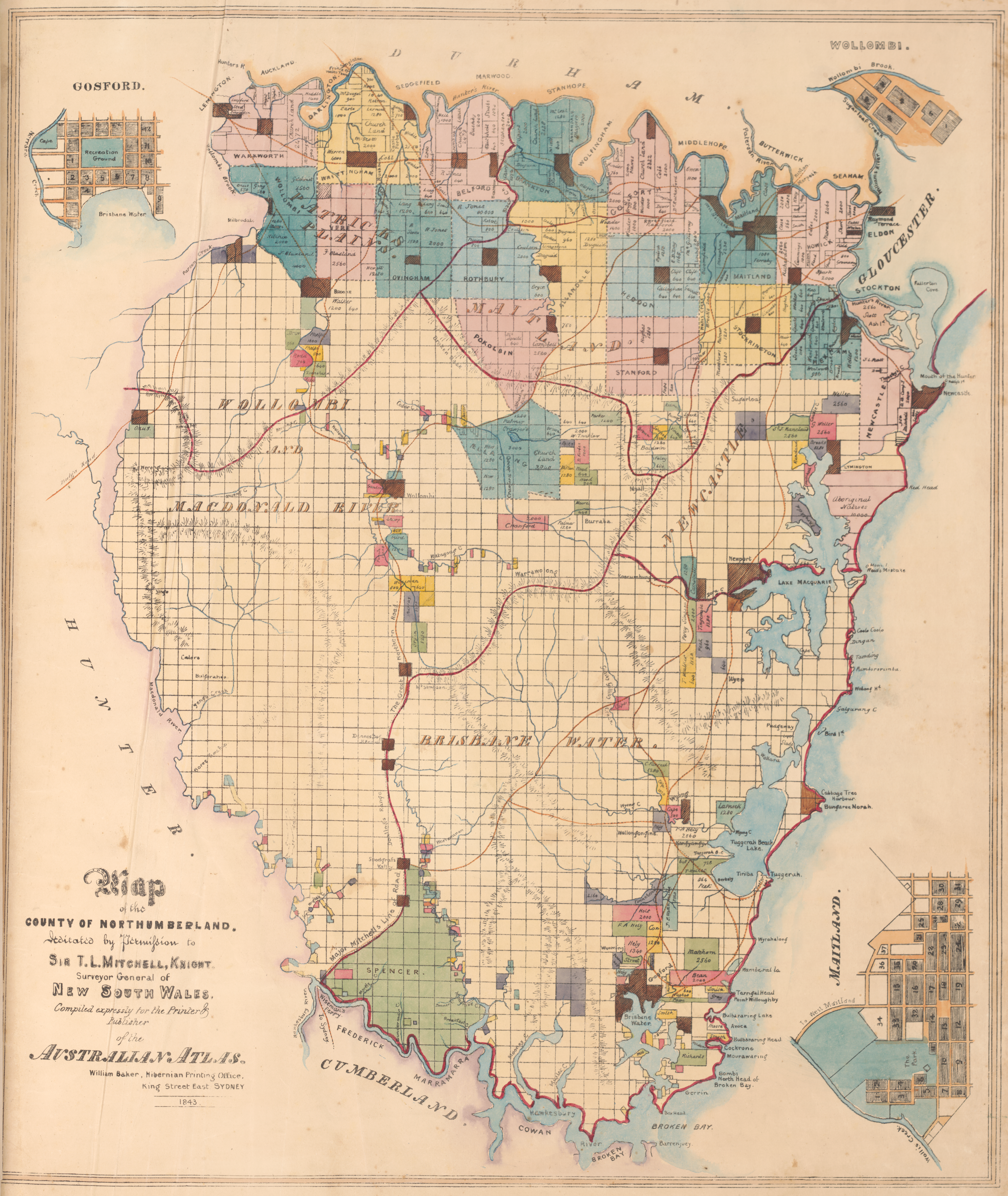
- State: New South Wales
- Created: 1843
- Abolished: 1851
- Namesake: Northumberland County

The Electoral district of Northumberland Boroughs was an electorate of the partially elected New South Wales Legislative Council, created for the first elections for the Council in 1843. From 1843 until 1851 the electorate covered the major towns or boroughs of Northumberland County, East Maitland, West Maitland and Newcastle, and polling took place at East Maitland, West Maitland and Newcastle. Morpeth was added to the electorate from 1851 while Newcastle was removed from the electorate to form, with Raymond Terrace, the North Eastern Boroughs. The rest of Northumberland County was covered by the County of Northumberland from 1843 until 1951, and Counties of Northumberland and Hunter from 1851 until 1856.

In 1856 the unicameral Legislative Council was abolished and replaced with an elected Legislative Assembly and an appointed Legislative Council. The district was represented by the Legislative Assembly electorate of Northumberland Boroughs.

== Members ==
Member 1	Term
D'Arcy Wentworth	Jun 1843 – Jul 1845
Patrick Grant	Sep 1845 – Jun 1848
Bob Nichols	Jul 1848 – Feb 1856

Bob Nichols went on to represent Northumberland Boroughs in the Legislative Assembly from 1856.

== Election results ==
=== 1843 ===
1843 New South Wales colonial election, 20 June: Northumberland Boroughs
Candidate	Votes	%
D'Arcy Wentworth	121	52.84
Alexander Walker Scott	108	47.16
Total votes	229	100.00

=== 1845 ===
D'Arcy Wentworth resigned in July 1845.

Northumberland Boroughs by-election 16 September 1845
Candidate	Votes	%
Patrick Grant	92	55.42
William Ogilvie	74	44.58
Total votes	166	100.00

The election of Patrick Grant was declared void on the grounds that he was not qualified to stand, however he was re-elected unopposed.

=== 1848 ===
1848 New South Wales colonial election, 29 July: Northumberland Boroughs
Candidate	Votes	%
Bob Nichols (elected)	185	70
William Moir	80	30
Total votes	265	100

=== 1851 ===
1851 New South Wales colonial election, 17 September: Northumberland Boroughs
Candidate	Votes	%
Bob Nichols	unopposed	

== See also ==
- Members of the New South Wales Legislative Council, 1843–1851 and 1851-1856
