= William Macarthur =

Australian botanist and vigneron

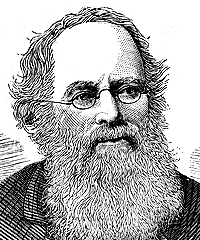
- Born: December 1800; Parramatta
- Died: 29 October 1882 (aged 81–82); Sydney
- Occupation: Botanist, politician, pastoralist, horse-breeder, land owner, magistrate, publican, breeder
- Parent(s): John Macarthur; Elizabeth Macarthur
- Relatives: Edward Macarthur, James Macarthur
- Position held: Member of the New South Wales Legislative Council (1849–1851), Member of the New South Wales Legislative Council (1851–1855), Member of the New South Wales Legislative Council (1864–1882)

The Honourable Sir William Macarthur (December 1800 – 29 October 1882) was an Australian botanist and vigneron. He was one of the most active and influential horticulturists in Australia in the mid-to-late 19th century. Among the first viticulturists in Australia, Macarthur was a medal-winning wine-maker, as well as a respected amateur botanist and noted plant breeder.

== Biography ==
William Macarthur was born at Parramatta in December 1800, the fifth son of John and Elizabeth Macarthur, pioneers of the Australian wool industry. He was educated in England at Rugby School, returned to Australia with his father in 1817, and assisted in the management of his estates. These estates included land controlled by the Macarthurs south along the Murrumbidgee River from Gundagai. Brothers James and William Macarthur stocked 'Nangus Station' with cattle in 1831. The island in the middle of the River at Nangus is marked as one of the early goldfields and named "M'Arthur Island". The island is where the highly auriferous Adelong Creek enters the Murrumbidgee River. William pursued a slight career in colonial politics, though this was secondary to his interests in botany. William lived at Camden Park, south west of Sydney, with his brother James who was prominent in local and colonial politics.

== Contribution to horticulture ==
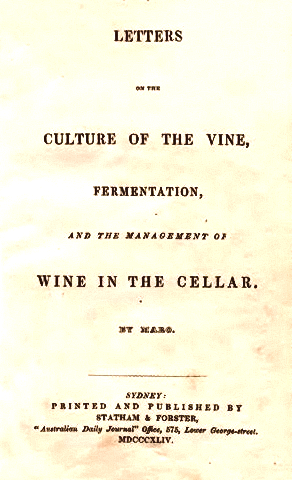
Title page of Letters on the culture of the vine, fermentation, and the management of wine in the cellar, 1844 by "Maro" — the pseudonym for William Macarthur.

In 1844, William Macarthur, regarded at the time as a leading Australian viticulturist, published a small volume, Letters on the Culture of the Vine, Fermentation, and the Management of the Cellar, which was widely read. He was President of New South Wales Vineyard Association and had a vineyard and extensive cellars at the family estate at Camden Park.

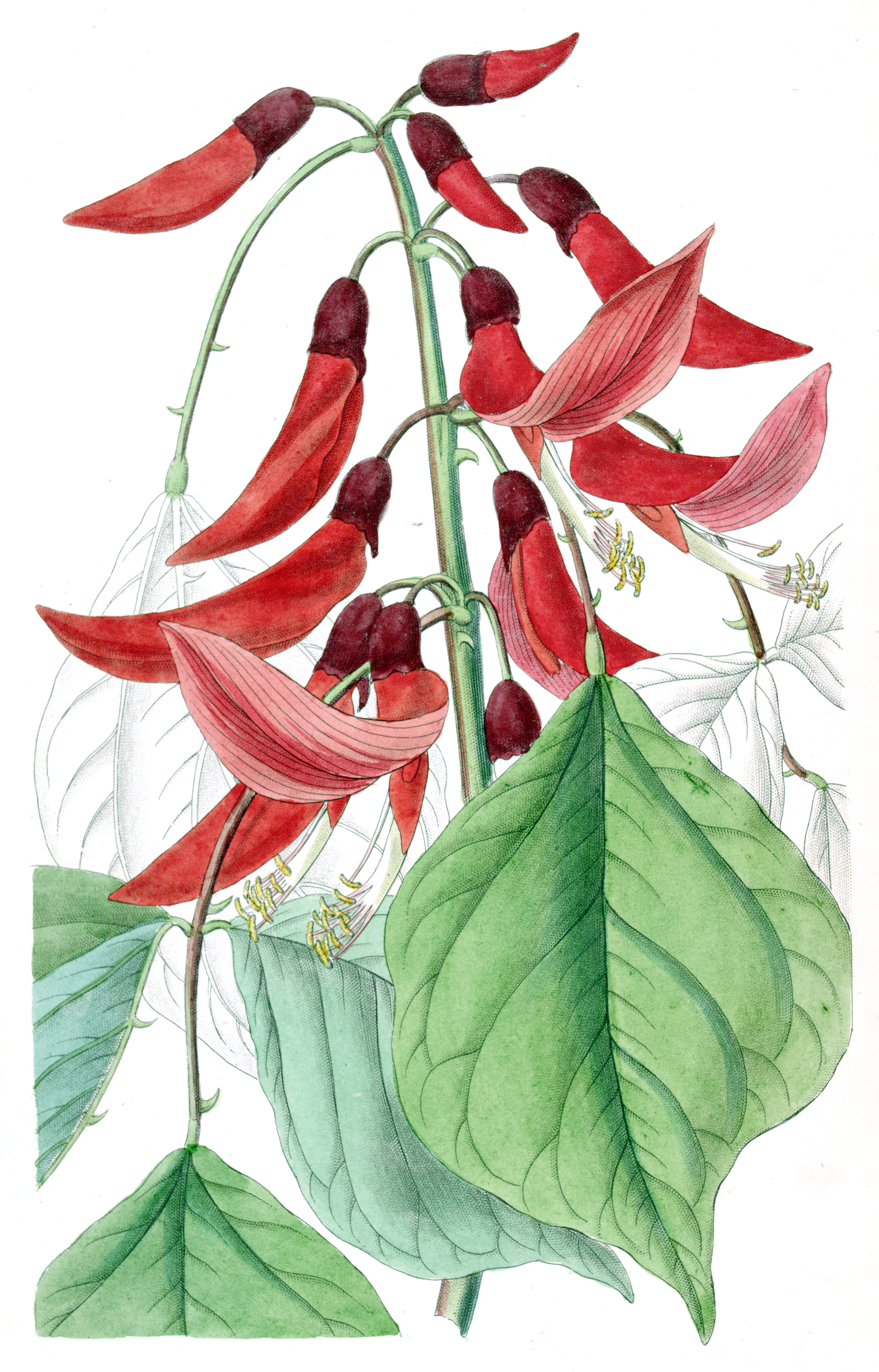
Erythrina ×bidwillii 'Camdeni' — bred by William Macarthur, was the first Australian hybrid garden plant to be published in England, in 1847.

Macarthur was a competent botanist, horticulturist and agriculturist, and his operations helped to make Camden Park celebrated. He entertained eminent scientific men who visited the Colony and bore the reputation of a cultured gentleman. He sent plants to James Backhouse which are now in the Herbarium at the Royal Botanic Gardens, Kew and the British Museum. The extensive catalogues of his Camden Park Nursery, published in 1843, 1845, 1850 and 1857, provide a valuable insight both into the contents of colonial gardens and to the international exchange of plants in the early-to-mid-19th century. 'Aspasia macarthur', bred at Camden Park, was the first Australian cultivar of the camellia.

Macarthur is commemorated in the genus Macarthuria Hugel ex Endl., also in the species: Cyathea macarthurii F.Muell. and Ptychosperma macarthurii

The standard author abbreviation Macarthur is used to indicate this person as the author when citing a botanical name.

== Political life ==
In 1848 he unsuccessfully sought election for the New South Wales Legislative Council seat representing the Town of Parramatta, but in 1849 he was elected the member for Port Phillip. That seat was abolished when Port Phillip separated as the Colony of Victoria in 1851 and Macarthur remained in the council as the member for the Pastoral Districts of Lachlan and Lower Darling before resigning in 1855. In 1854 he was a member of a commission for the colony's participation in the Paris International Exhibition of 1855, where his fluency in French was invaluable in resolving initial confusion over the areas allotted to the Australian colonies. A selection of Australian timber specimens from the Exposition are displayed at Camden Park. Shortly afterwards he was knighted. He returned to Australia in 1857 and was appointed a member of the Legislative Council in 1864, but he never took a prominent part in politics and was more at home with his pastoral pursuits, having been given stewardship of his family's landmark pastoral property Camden Park. He was also an active in club life and served as the president of the Australian Club.

He died unmarried on 29 October 1882. His estate, along with those of his brothers James and Sir Edward, was left to his niece, James' daughter Elizabeth, wife of Arthur Alexander Walton Onslow. After Arthur's death, Elizabeth changed her name to Macarthur-Onslow.

== Named in his honour ==
Mount Macarthur (a mountain in Queensland) was named after him by Ludwig Leichhardt. Macarthar had provided support for Liechhardt's expedition.

New South Wales Legislative Council
| Preceded by James Williamson | Member for Port Phillip; Feb 1849 – Jun 1851; Served alongside: John Dickson, Lauchlan Mackinnon / Charles Ebden, Edward Curr / Henry Moor, James Palmer / John Foster / William Mercer | Colony of Victoria established |
| New district | Member for the Pastoral Districts of Lachlan and Lower Darling; Sep 1851 – Jan 1855 | Succeeded by William Macleay |
