= John McGarvie =

British minister (1795 – 1853)

John McGarvie (1795 – 12 April 1853) was a Scottish-born Australian Presbyterian minister and writer.

== Early life and education ==
McGarvie was born in Glasgow, Scotland, and was educated at Glasgow University, where he graduated. In 1840 the University of Glasgow awarded McGarvie an honorary Doctor of Divinity for his lifetime achievement.

== Life and ministry in New South Wales ==
McGarvie responded to an appeal in 1825 to become the first Presbyterian minister of the Ebenezer Church at Portland Head on Sydney's Hawkesbury River. Selected by Rev John Dunmore Lang to take up the appointment he arrived in Sydney on 22 May 1826 aboard the Greenock after a six month voyage from Leith.

McGarvie served as Presbyterian minister to the Hawkesbury River community between 1826 and 1830. His personal papers during this time contain word lists of the local Aboriginal people along the Dyarubbin (Hawkesbury River). Home to the Darug people the lists are entitled: "Native names of places on the Hawkesbury".

McGarvie later served as minister at St Andrew's Scots Church, Sydney. Initially he filled the pulpit in 1830 during John Dunmore Lang's two-year absence abroad. In 1832 he accepted an invitation to start a second Presbyterian church in Sydney and held services in the courthouse until St Andrew's Scots Church was ready for services in Kent Street. It was eventually opened on 13 September 1835. McGarvie remained there until his death.

A volume of his sermons published in Sydney in 1842 and his personal papers have been digitised by the Mitchell Library, State Library of New South Wales.

He died on 12 April 1853 and was buried at Gore Hill Cemetery, he was unmarried.

== Bibliography ==
- Fasti Ecclesiae Scoticanae, Volume VII - Synods of Ross, Sutherland and Caithness, Glenelg, Orkney and of Shetland, the Church in England, Ireland and Overseas - 2nd edition, 1928, page 593
- J. Maclehose, The Picture of Sydney (Syd, 1838)
- J. Cameron, Centenary History of the Presbyterian Church in New South Wales, vol 1 (Syd, 1905)
- A Century of Journalism: The Sydney Morning Herald, 1831–1931 (Syd, 1931)
- G. R. S. Reid, The History of Ebenezer, Australia's Oldest Church (Petersham, 1951)
- C. A. White, The Challenge of the Years: A History of the Presbyterian Church of Australia in the State of New South Wales (Syd, 1951)
- Truth (Sydney), 26 Mar 1911
- McGarvie papers (Presbyterian Library, Assembly Hall, Sydney)
