= Edward Brewster =

Australian politician (1812 - 1898)

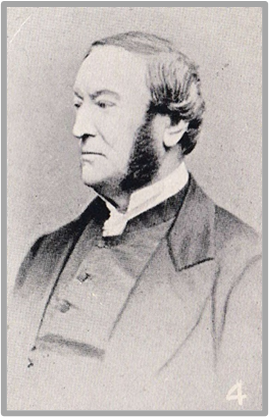
Edward Jones Brewster

Edward Jones Brewster (c.1812 – 17 March 1898) was a lawyer and politician in colonial Australia, a member of the New South Wales Legislative Council.

Born in Dublin, Ireland, in 1812, and educated for the Bar at Trinity College, Dublin, where he graduated in 1835, Brewster commenced practice under his uncle, Lord Chancellor of Ireland Abraham Brewster. Soon afterwards he came to Melbourne, and having good letters of introduction from the great Earl of Derby and others, he was, within a fortnight of his landing, made Chairman of Quarter Sessions and Commissioner of the Court of Requests. Brewster was admitted to the New South Wales Bar in 1839. Around 1841 Brewster was one of the first six barristers admitted to the Port Phillip bar (along with Robert Pohlman, Redmond Barry, James Croke, Archibald Cuninghame and James Murray).

Brewster was elected to New South Wales Legislative Council as member for Port Phillip District (later to become the separate colony of Victoria) on 1 January 1846, a position he held until 1 February 1848.

On his return to England Brewster went up to Oxford in 1853, studied for the Anglican ministry, and was ordained the same year. He was later vicar of Ampney Crucis, Gloucester, and Leyton, Essex. Brewster died in Cape Town, South Africa on his way to re-visit Australia. One newspaper put his age at death at 83. His younger brother John Grey Brewster had died the previous year at his home in Cheltenham, leaving issue.

New South Wales Legislative Council
Preceded by Thomas Boyd	Member for Port Phillip; Jan 1846 – Feb 1848; With: Edward Curr 1845–46; John Foster 1846–48; Charles Nicholson 1846–48; Maurice O'Connell 1846–48; John Lang 1846–47; John Airey 1844–48	Succeeded by Charles Ebden
