= Black Rock House =

Heritage-listed house in Melbourne, Victoria, Australia

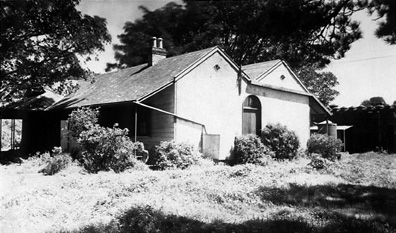
- Postcard photograph of the house in c. 1920

- Location of the house in Greater Metropolitan Melbourne
- Former names: Ebden Castle

General information
- Status: Completed
- Type: House; Historic house museum (since 1979)
- Architectural style: Old Colonial vernacular
- Location: 30–36 Ebden Avenue, Black Rock, City of Bayside, Melbourne, Victoria, Australia
- Coordinates: 37°58′41″S 145°01′07″E
- Completed: 1856; 170 years ago
- Client: Charles Ebden

Technical details
- Material: Stone; bricks; weatherboard; timber; slate

Design and construction
- Architects: Clauscen and Becker (attrib.)
- Main contractor: John Harty; John and Patrick Barrow; James Horan

Site notes
- Owner: City of Bayside (since 1979)
- Management: Friends of Black Rock House
- Public access: First Sunday of the month
- Website: blackrockhouse.org.au

Victorian Heritage Register
- Official name: Black Rock House
- Type: Registered place
- Designated: 9 October 1974
- Reference no.: H0216
- Heritage overlay no.: HO148
- Category: Residential buildings (private)

Register of the National Estate
- Official name: Black Rock House
- Type: Defunct register
- Designated: 21 March 1978
- Reference no.: 5785

The Black Rock House, originally called the Ebden Castle, is a former house, now an historic house museum, located at 30–36 Ebden Avenue in Black Rock, in the City of Bayside, in the south eastern suburbs of Melbourne, in Victoria, Australia.

Built in 1856 on the traditional lands of the Bunurong people, the house was added to the Victorian Heritage Register on 9 October 1974 in recognition of its architectural and historical significance; and was also added to non-statutory lists by the Victorian branch of the National Trust on 17 September 1959 and the now defunct Register of the National Estate on 21 March 1978.

== History ==
Black Rock House at Black Rock was built for Charles Ebden, a colonial Australian squatter and leading early colonial figure who served in the parliaments of both New South Wales and Victoria. Ebden was born in the Cape Colony of South Africa, settled in Sydney in 1832, became a squatter in southern New South Wales and northern Victoria, and made significant profits from his pastoralism and astute land dealings. Ebden lived in Melbourne, and between 1856 and 1858, built a holiday house, originally called Ebden Castle, for his family overlooking Port Phillip Bay, south of Melbourne, not far from Brighton, which was already a popular retreat for squatters and Melbourne merchants.

The architects of the house are attributed as Clauscen and Becker, although, unconfirmed. The house was built by rock miner John Harty, stonemasons John and Patrick Barrow, and carpenter James Horan. Sir Henry Barkly, the Governor of Victoria from 1857 to 1863, rented the house for six months as a seaside residence, making it the first country house occupied by any Victorian Governor. It remained in the Ebden family until 1910. Professor (later Sir) Peter McCallum bought the house in 1931, and did much to restore the buildings, which had earlier been threatened with demolition, and also restored the garden.

In c. 1979, the property was acquired by the Sandringham City Council, now the City of Bayside, and was restored.

== Description ==
Black Rock House consists of two buildings linked by a walkway. The family living quarters were in a T-shaped single storey house in a simple Old Colonial vernacular style, constructed with brick gable end walls and weatherboard infill walls, timber-lined and with a double gable slate roof. There is a verandah paved with Scottish stone around three sides of this, part of it carried on distinctive simple slender iron columns. The two principal rooms are on the south side of the house, overlooking Port Phillip Bay, and are separated from the bedroom wing by a wide entrance hall. The front entrance has a classical inspired doorway of unusual design with pilasters and entablature. There is a cellar under the principal rooms.

The house is joined by means of a covered walkway – approximately twelve metres (thirty-nine feet) long – to a rectangular stable and service block. This is surrounded by a high castellated stone wall of random coursed local ironstone with prominent piers and massive timber gates, which was probably influenced by homestead architecture in Ebden's native South Africa. This block has an internal courtyard which had stables along one side, service quarters and kitchens on two sides, and may once also have been used for large-scale entertaining. The house is set in a garden with mature trees.

== See also ==
- Architecture of Melbourne
- List of museums in Melbourne
- List of places on the Victorian Heritage Register in the City of Bayside
