= John Dunmore Lang =

Australian politician (1799–1878)

The Reverend John Dunmore Lang MA, DD
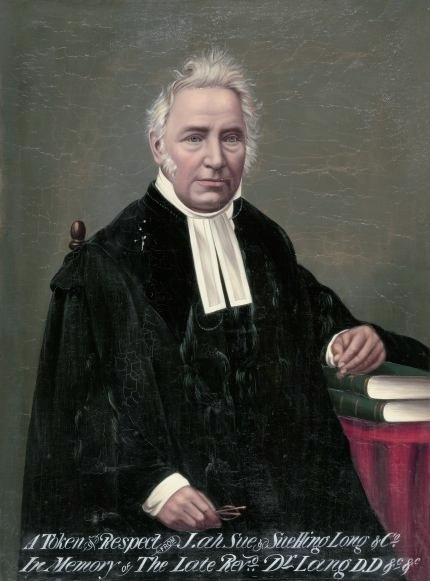
- Posthumous portrait of Lang, circa 1888.

Member of the New South Wales Legislative Assembly for West Sydney
- In office 14 June 1859 – 15 November 1869
- Preceded by: Electorate established
- Succeeded by: William Speer

Member of the New South Wales Legislative Council
- In office 1 August 1854 – 29 February 1856
- Preceded by: Arthur Hodgson
- Succeeded by: Electorate abolished
- Constituency: County of Stanley
- In office 1 July 1850 – 1 October 1851
- Preceded by: William Bland
- Succeeded by: Robert Campbell
- Constituency: City of Sydney
- In office 1 June 1843 – 1 November 1847
- Preceded by: Electorate established
- Succeeded by: John Airey
- Constituency: Port Phillip

Personal details
- Born: 25 August 1799 Greenock, Inverclyde, Scotland
- Died: 8 August 1878 (aged 78) Sydney, Colony of New South Wales
- Resting place: Scots Church, Sydney
- Citizenship: Great Britain; United Kingdom
- Spouse: Wilhelmina Mackie (m. 1831)
- Children: 10
- Education: University of Glasgow
- Occupation: Presbyterian Minister; Politician

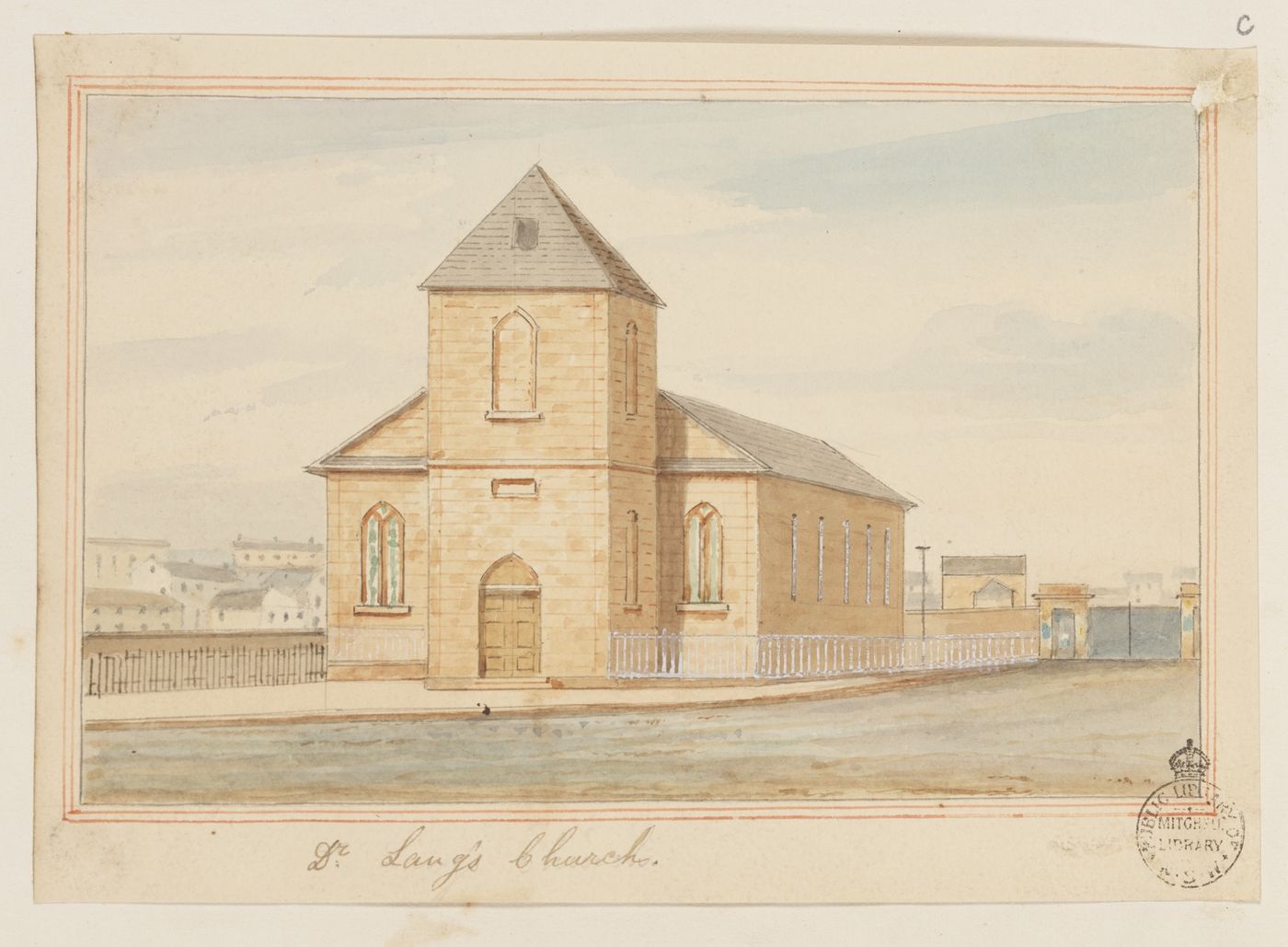
Scots Church, Sydney, 1840s

John Dunmore Lang (25 August 1799 – 8 August 1878) was a Scottish-born Australian Presbyterian minister, writer, historian, politician and activist. He was the first prominent advocate of an independent Australian nation and of Australian republicanism.

== Background and family ==
Lang was born near Greenock, Renfrewshire (now Inverclyde), Scotland, the eldest son of William Lang and Mary Dunmore. His father was a small landowner and his mother a pious Presbyterian, who dedicated her son to the Church of Scotland ministry from an early age. He grew up in nearby Largs and was educated at the school there and at the University of Glasgow, where he excelled, winning many prizes and graduating as a Master of Arts in 1820. Stevenson McGill was his most influential teacher; he also greatly admired Thomas Chalmers. His brother, George, had found employment in New South Wales and Lang decided to join him. He was ordained by the Presbytery of Irvine on 30 September 1822. Arriving in Sydney Cove on 23 May 1823, he became the first Presbyterian minister in the colony of New South Wales. (He had come out to Hobart on Andromeda, and then had sailed from Hobart to Sydney on Brixton.) On the way back from the second of his nine voyages to Britain (1830–31), he married his 18-year-old cousin, Wilhelmina Mackie, in Cape Town. They were married for 47 years and had ten children, only three of whom survived him. There were no grandchildren.

== Lang and the claims of the Church of England ==
Lang found the Presbyterian Scots in New South Wales to be a small minority, dominated by an Anglican administration and outnumbered by Irish Roman Catholics. There was no Presbyterian church in the colony and he commenced building one before he had applied to the Governor of New South Wales, Sir Thomas Brisbane, to provide public funds for it. Governor Brisbane refused. Lang had laid the foundation stone for the Scots Church on 1 July 1824 and it was completed with significant debt by William and Andrew Lang and opened on 16 July 1826, with a trust deed that tied it to the Church of Scotland. Lang visited Britain during 1824–25, where he successfully lobbied the Secretary for the Colonies, Lord Bathurst, to recognise the legal status of the Church of Scotland to the extent that he was allowed a stipend of £300 per annum (current equivalent: £24,240). During this visit, he was made a Doctor of Divinity by Glasgow University and recruited the John McGarvie for ministry at Portland Head.

Lang resisted the claim to exclusive state recognition and support by the Church of England involved in the establishment of the Clergy and School Lands Corporation in 1826. It was suspended in 1829 and abolished in 1833. Also in 1826, he claimed the right to perform marriages by virtue of a British act of Parliament of 1818 relating to the Diocese of Calcutta which protected Church of Scotland ministers there and thus broke the Church of England monopoly, with New South Wales then being part of that diocese. The Church Act of 1836 gave state-aid to the Church of England, the Church of Scotland and the Roman Catholic Church on the same basis. The Methodists were added in 1839.

Lang's views on the Church of England were evident when he published his opinions in "On the Character and Influence of the Present European Population of New Zealand, as Regards the Aborigines" in four Letters To the Right Hon. Earl Durham that were published in England. Lord Durham was a supporter of the New Zealand Company. The second letter was a virulent attack on the Church Missionary Society in New Zealand, which opposed the colonial aspirations of the New Zealand Company. The Church Missionary Society in New Zealand was led by Archdeacon Henry Williams.

== Educational endeavours ==
Lang founded the Caledonian Academy in 1826, but it soon folded. He made a second visit to Britain in 1830–31 and recruited several teachers, as well as acquiring a library and equipment for a school he was to call the Australian College. It opened at the beginning of 1832 on land adjoining the Scots Church. It had considerable promise which was not realised due to Lang's lack of administrative ability and his failure to achieve more general support because of his own flaws of character and ability, particularly financial mismanagement. By 1840 it had only about 30 students. In 1842 the college became simply a day school for boys meeting elsewhere and was no more by 1852. Lang dreamed of heading an educational institution of standing. He was a supporter of the Presbyterian Theological College and of St Andrew's College within the University of Sydney, although he used his political influence to try and change the legislation and hoped in 1872 to be appointed its first principal. He was not appointed and in anger stated that St Andrew's College was "conceived in sin and brought forth in iniquity and certain to become a notorious failure". His portrait does, however, continue to hang in the college's Senior Common Room.

== Lang and journalism ==
Lang returned from his third visit to Britain (1833–34) with more ministers and teachers, as well as a printing press and tradesmen to operate it. He commenced The Colonist in January 1835, which he used to promote his schemes, and attack those with whom he disagreed. While he was absent in Britain 1839–41, until it ceased in 1840, Rev William McIntyre edited the paper and it reported impartially on matters then agitating the Presbyterian Church. Lang commenced a new paper, The Colonial Observer, in October 1841, which ran until 1844. He also conducted The Press for a period in 1851.

== Lang's theology ==
Lang was certainly a turbulent Scot but was not quite the fiery fundamentalist who hated all other denominations that some have claimed. Examination of his sermon manuscripts indicate they were orthodox by the standard of the Westminster Confession of Faith as adhered to by the Church of Scotland. He was influenced by Rev Dr Thomas Chalmers and held a form of the premillennial view of the future. He related quite positively to other denominations of evangelical Protestants, particularly Congregationalists, Lutherans and Methodists. He admitted Congregationalists and Baptists to the Synod which he operated 1850–64, and in 1856 ordained two Lutherans, regarding the Lutheran questions and Confession, which he used on the occasion, as the same in substance with those of the British Presbyterians. His ecclesiastical fights were with exclusivist Anglicans, other Presbyterians and the Catholics.

== Attitude to Roman Catholics ==
The traditional evangelical Protestant belief concerning the predicted Antichrist, or Man of Sin in 2 Thessalonians 2, was that: the Man of Sin was not an individual as such but a movement of error in history under the guise of friendship to Christ. Lang shared this belief and saw the Man of Sin as illustrated in the Papacy. When the immigration of poor Irish Catholics was running at a massive level, he campaigned against Irish migration. His fear was that the colony would be swamped by such persons and that Protestant and British liberties would be lost. In 1841 he published The Question of Questions! or, Is this Colony to be transformed into a Province of Popedom? A Letter to the Protestant Landholders of New South Wales, and in 1847 he followed up with, Popery in Australia and the Southern Hemisphere: and How to Check it Effectually: An Address to Evangelical and Influential Protestants of all Denominations in Great Britain and Ireland. He strongly opposed Caroline Chisholm's campaign to sponsor the immigration of single Irish Catholic women to Australia. But, as Bridges states: "Lang considered opposition to harmful errors of Catholicism part of his duty as a minister but he consistently championed the cause of Irish and Catholic civil liberties and deprecated any incitement to Protestant-Catholic or Anglo-Celtic disturbances." He visited Archbishop Polding when the Roman Catholic leader was dying in 1877.

Despite his bitter anti-Catholicism, his political ideas won him wide support among the Irish Catholic population, who shared his dislike of English and Anglican dominance. In return, he supported Home Rule for Ireland – partly because he thought this would reduce the Irish Catholic influence in British government.

== Lang and the Presbyterian Church ==
The Presbytery of New South Wales (which then included what is now Victoria and Queensland) was formed on 14 December 1832, despite the intemperate habits of two of the ministers, and the opposition of John McGarvie, who had turned out to be a Scottish Moderate. This Presbytery ordained a minister for Launceston and in turn the Presbytery of Van Diemen's Land was constituted on 6 November 1835 by Lang and two others.

The Presbytery in New South Wales had a number of unsuitable ministers. Lang determined on a further visit to Britain in 1836, securing about 20 men from the Church of Scotland and from the Synod of Ulster. Lang had a pre-arranged plan to set up a rival church court to the Presbytery. When he returned in 1837 he found that an Act to regulate the temporal affairs of the Presbytery had been secured from the Government, the terms of which made the Presbytery the only legal representative of the Church of Scotland in the colony. The Presbytery Moderator's certificate was necessary for payment of stipends under the Church Act. Lang thereupon represented the Temporalities Act as 'monstrous and disgraceful in the highest degree' and having the effect of forcing him and his supporters out. This was complete fabrication, but Lang and five of the new recruits joined in constituting a Synod on 11 December 1837. Lang placed men in the same localities as Presbytery ministers to draw off adherents and drive out the drunkards. A full-blown schism operated until union was effected in 1840.

The Presbytery expelled Lang for schism on 18 January 1838. Lang used The Colonist to spread contention. As James Forbes put it, 'week after week he poured forth vollies of abuse against the Presbytery, unequalled for satanic bitterness and vulgar scurrility, by the worst of the London Sunday papers.' Lang was on a further trip to Britain and America 1839–41, and in his absence terms of union were agreed and the union consummated on 5 October 1840 under the name 'Synod of Australia in connection with the Established Church of Scotland.' The Basis did not give the Church of Scotland any legislative or judicial jurisdiction, but the Synod was committed to the same doctrinal basis as the Church of Scotland. Presbyteries were created subject to the Synod. Lang was admitted on his return in March 1841.

In 1840 Lang published a substantial volume entitled Religion and Education in America in which he advocated support of churches by voluntary givings rather than the State, and went so far as to advocate no connection between Church and State. This conflicted with the official views of the Church of Scotland as set out in the Confession of Faith, which can be summarised thus: (1) Church and State are distinct and separate institutions, both being accountable to the Lord Jesus Christ who has received all authority in heaven and earth from the Father; (2) the mutually helpful relationship between Church and State does not imply subordination of one to the other in its own sphere; and, in particular, the civil authorities have no jurisdiction or authoritative control in the spiritual affairs of Christ's Church. (3) In maintaining these Scriptural principles, and the ideal of a united Christian Church in a Christian nation, the Church does not regard the involvement of the State in matters concerning religion as ipso facto contrary to liberty of conscience. Rather, she rejects intolerance or persecution as methods of advancing the kingdom of God, and recognises the individual's liberty of conscience and the right of private judgement.

Lang's views brought opposition from many including some who had previously supported him. Lang's repute had already declined in Scotland. When he was censured for allowing to preach in Scot's Church a Congregational minister who had been rejected by the Synod, he reacted negatively. On 6 February 1842 he told his congregation that he would go to New Zealand and be supported by voluntary givings. In an extraordinary blast of invective, and alluding to the narrative of Joshua 6:20ff, he said that the Australian church could not prosper until she renounced with indignant scorn the Babylonish garment of an infidel establishment of religion and abandoned the wedge of gold that corrupted all who touched it. At length he consented to remain when the bulk of the 500 adults in his congregation agreed to sever all connection with the Synod and with the State. On 8 October 1842 the Synod deposed Lang for slander – calling the Synod a synagogue of Satan particularly displeased the brethren – divisive courses and contumacy by an 8–4 vote. Ultimately, on 9 September 1851, the Presbytery of Irvine in Scotland declared Lang no longer a minister of the Church of Scotland, but did not tell Lang what was afoot nor give him an opportunity to defend himself.

Lang tried with minimal success to start a new body. In July 1846 he set off again for Britain returning in March 1850. He and two other ministers set up the Synod of New South Wales (the second of this name) on 3 April 1850, although the minutes term it The Australian Presbyterian Church. During its life of some 14 years, 31 ministers were connected with it at one time or another, including 8 of the 20 brought out by Lang in 1850. It was very loose in approach. Some have regarded it as an attempt to establish a comprehensive evangelical Protestant body, but it appears more an attempt by Lang to maintain a useful power base and maintain his own ego. In 1858, Lang recruited John Reid (the father of future prime minister George Reid) from a Melbourne congregation to serve as his associate. They shared the preaching duties and divided the pastoral duties between them, although Lang remained the church's sole leader. They eventually fell out and Reid moved on to another congregation. By November 1864, there were four ministers (including Lang) connected with the church.

Lang was out of the mainstream from 1842, but his political influence was such that he had to be accommodated if union of the three Presbyterian streams was to be achieved. The original Synod of Australia did not wish to recognise Lang, despite having to recall the deposition in 1863 (which was done by a majority of one vote), following Lang securing the reversal of the Presbytery of Irvine's sentence in 1861. Lang's Synod lost its identity by being merged on 15 November 1864 with the majority of the Presbyterian Church of Eastern Australia, to form a General Synod which then merged with the original Synod of Australia to form the Presbyterian Church of New South Wales on 8 September 1865 with 47 ministers. In 1872 he was chosen Moderator of the Assembly but used his speech to seriously criticise his brethren for not choosing him earlier. There wasn't too much mellowing as he grew older.

As a churchman Lang was wilful, egotistical, not respectable (twice jailed for libel). He 'preached more of the Gospel than he practised', someone quipped. From the Presbyterian viewpoint Lang is therefore something of an ambiguous figure. James Forbes, writing in 1846 about the 1837 period, stated: '...it has ever appeared to us one of the most mysterious permissions of Divine Providence, that the founding of an infant church in an infant colony should have fallen into such hands.'

== Lang and politics ==
In The Colonist Lang agitated for the end of transportation, for the separation of the Moreton Bay Colony (which he proposed to be called Cooksland, but was eventually called Queensland) and the Port Phillip District (which he proposed to be called Phillipsland, but was eventually called Victoria) from New South Wales, and for the establishment of representative government and the reduction in the powers of the British-appointed Governors.

In 1843 Lang was elected to the New South Wales Legislative Council as one of five representatives of the Electoral district of Port Phillip, holding his seat until 1847. From July 1850 to October 1851, Lang was one of the Council members for City of Sydney, and in 1854 he was elected to the Council for County of Stanley. Lang was MLA for West Sydney from 1859 to 1869. Lang was not suited to parliamentary life, since he was temperamentally opposed to parliamentary procedure. He frequently used parliamentary privilege to pursue personal vendettas against his many enemies in the Presbyterian Church and the press.

In 1851, in any case, he was unable to take his seat in Parliament, since he was heavily in debt from his various failed migration schemes and was being pressed by creditors. He was sued for debt, and when he attacked his creditors in the press he was prosecuted for libel, and sentenced to a 100-pound fine and four months imprisonment in Parramatta Gaol. He was imprisoned again in 1855, when his son George, manager of the Ballarat branch of the Bank of New South Wales, was convicted of embezzlement. Lang attacked the judge in print and was sentenced to six months imprisonment for criminal libel. Ten thousand people signed a petition for his release, but he served the full sentence.

By 1850 Lang, inspired by the Chartist movement in Britain and by the 1848 revolution in France, had become a radical democrat and a republican. With Henry Parkes and James Wilshire he founded the Australian League political party, although he soon quarrelled with his fellow-founders. He put forward ideas which were both visionary and radical – the federation of the Australian colonies, the establishment of a fully democratic government (at a time when both in Britain and Australia the franchise was restricted to owners of property) and an Australian republic. These ideas reflected both the Presbyterian ideal of congregational self-government (despite the fact that in church affairs he was an autocrat) and his Scottish nationalist dislike of English and Anglican supremacy.

In 1850 Lang published The Coming Event! Or, the United Provinces of Australia in which he predicted an independent Australian federal republic. He followed this in 1852 with Freedom and Independence for the Golden Lands of Australia, his best-known work. The title of this work has become an established slogan of political radicalism and republicanism in Australia. His relation to the political union of 1901 is, however, ambiguous. By 1875 Lang had rejected his earlier 'continental' vision of a federated, self-governing Australia, in favour of confining the claim of 'freedom and independence' to New South Wales, Queensland, 'Capricornia' (northern Queensland) and 'Carpentaria'.

Lang was an enthusiastic promoter of the development of the Australian colonies. In 1834 he published in Britain the first edition of An Historical and Statistical Account of New South Wales, both as a Penal Colony and as a British Colony, which ran through a series of editions until his death, to promote immigration and investment in Australia. The Westminster Review commented that the book should have been called A History of Dr. Lang to which is added a History of New South Wales'. He also published Port-Phillip, or the colony of Victoria in 1853, and Queensland, Australia in 1861 to promote the northern colony. In 1849, three immigrant ships (Fortitude, Chaseley, Lima) sponsored by Lang arrived in Moreton Bay with approximately 600 immigrants all personally selected by Lang. Lang Park in Brisbane is named after him in recognition of his work promoting the colony.

Despite their eccentricity, Lang's works were influential in promoting Australia, but his practical schemes for immigration were usually fiascos owing to his lack of business sense. After 1851, in any case, immigration to Australia boomed due to the Gold Rush and had no need of promotion.

Lang's influence should not be underestimated but was marred by his wilful personality. As well, the wave of radicalism in Britain and Australia of the mid-19th century soon passed and was succeeded by an era of enthusiasm for the British Empire. But he has become an iconic figure in Australian history for his advocacy of Australian nationalism, federation, full political democracy and republicanism. Lang is the namesake of Dunmore Lang College, at Macquarie University in Sydney.

Lang's writings are voluminous, his activities multifarious. His power of description is remarkable, his assessments of individuals generally perceptive if tinged with his own prejudices. His egotism defies belief but his achievements are quite astonishing and overshadow his religious contribution. Excluding his newspaper articles his published work runs to some 10,000 pages.

Lang died on 8 August 1878 in Sydney following a stroke. His funeral, on 10 August, was "one of the largest that has taken place in the Australian colonies" – a funeral procession over a mile in length, led by 500 Chinese, with perhaps 70,000 people lining the streets. His wife died in 1888, and the last of his children in 1934. There were no grandchildren.

== Legacy ==
Lang's name is remembered in

- John Dunmore Lang Place in Canberra
- Lang Park in Brisbane
- Lang Park in Sydney
- Dunmore Lang College at Macquarie University
- John Dunmore Lang Statue in Wynyard Park, Sydney
- National Library of Australia holds his private papers

== Notes ==
New South Wales Legislative Council
New creation	Member for Port Phillip; June 1843 – November 1847; With: Charles Nicholson 1843–47; Thomas Walker 1843–45; Maurice O'Connell 1845–47; Charles Ebden 1843–44; Adolphus Young 1844–45; Thomas Boyd 1845; Edward Brewster 1846–47; Alexander Thomson 1843–44; Thomas Mitchell 1844; Benjamin Boyd 1844–45; Edward Curr 1845–46; John Foster 1846–47	Succeeded by John Airey
Preceded by William Bland	Member for City of Sydney; July 1850 – October 1851; With: William Wentworth	Succeeded by Robert Campbell
Preceded by Arthur Hodgson	Member for County of Stanley; August 1854 – February 1856	Original Council abolished
New South Wales Legislative Assembly
New district	Member for West Sydney; June 1859 – November 1869; With: James Pemell 1859–60; John Plunkett 1859–60; Thomas Broughton 1859–60; William Windeyer 1860–62, 1866–69; Daniel Dalgleish 1860–64; Geoffrey Eagar 1863–64, 1865–69; John Robertson 1864–66	Succeeded by John Robertson; William Speer
