= Charles Ebden =

Australian politician

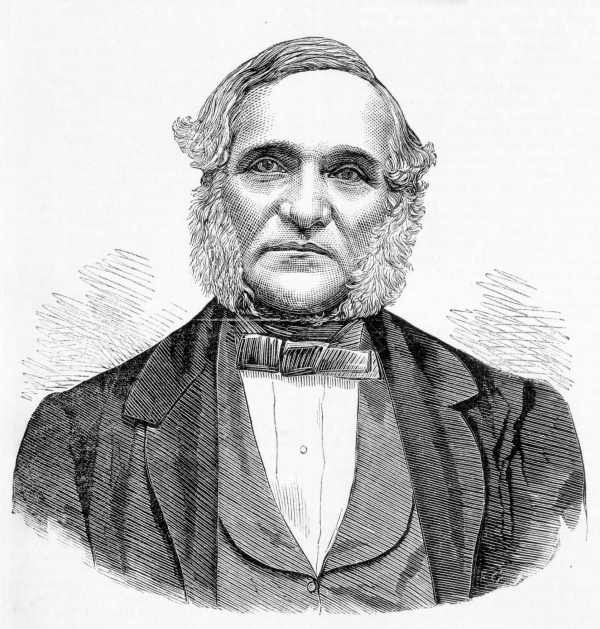
Woodblock print of Ebden, produced shortly after his death, based on an earlier photograph.

Charles Hotson Ebden (1811 – 28 October 1867) was an Australian pastoralist and politician, a member of the New South Wales Legislative Council, the Victorian Legislative Council and the Victorian Legislative Assembly.

== Early life ==
Ebden was born in 1811 at the Cape of Good Hope in the Cape Colony, the son of merchant, banker and politician John Bardwell Ebden and his wife Antoinetta. He was educated in England and also in Karlsruhe in the German Confederation.

== Early career in Australia ==
As a young man Ebden made several trips between the Cape and the Australian colonies, before settling in Sydney, New South Wales in 1832 and establishing a merchant business. After accumulating sufficient capital, he moved into pastoralism, and by early 1835 was among those pastoralists introducing cattle to the southern parts of New South Wales. He established a run at Tarcutta Creek, before his stockman, William Wyse, commenced two more runs straddling the Murray River: Mungabareena, near what is now Albury, and Bonegilla, near what is now Bonegilla, making Ebden the first pastoralist to send cattle across the Murray River.

Ebden hired Charles Bonney midway through 1836 to manage the stations on the Murray, but soon sent Bonney to search for an overland cattle route to Melbourne and the other settled parts of the Port Phillip District. The Ovens River was in flood during Bonney's first attempt, and he was unable to find a way across, but a second attempt was commenced on 25 December 1836. Some accounts place Ebden with Bonney on this second journey, which was completed on 7 January when the party arrived in Melbourne, just days behind John Gardiner, Joseph Hawdon and John Hepburn, the first to bring cattle overland from New South Wales.

Ebden and Charles Bonney drove 10,000 sheep from Mungabareena station on the Murray on 1 March 1837 and reached Sugarloaf Creek, a tributary of the Goulburn River on about 14 March 1837. They set up the first European settlement in inland Victoria, a sheep station, adjacent to the intersection of Seymour Pyalong Road with Tallarook Pyalong Road.

Ebden then shifted 9000 of the sheep to the second settlement in inland Victoria, Carlsruhe, arriving there on 26 May 1837. Charles Bonney in turn drove 1000 of the sheep to Kilmore and set up the third settlement in inland Victoria, another sheep station, on about 17 June 1837. Kilmore rapidly became the first inland town in Victoria.

Ebden's his flock was estimated to consist of nine thousand sheep, suggesting the backing of capital of about £20,000. He was in Melbourne in the middle of the year in time for the first land sale, held on 1 June 1837, at which one hundred lots of just under 0.5 acres (0.20 ha) each were auctioned, the lots covered eight major blocks, bounded by Flinders, Bourke, King and Swanston streets. Ebden was among the major purchases, buying three lots in Collins Street between Queen and William streets.

Ebden lived in Melbourne from about 1840, having sold Mungabareena station in 1837 and Carlsruhe station in 1840. He had also sold his three lots in Collins Street in September 1839 for a total of £10,244 (having purchased them two years earlier for £136); at the Melbourne Club shortly after the sale he remarked "I fear I am becoming disgustingly rich". In Melbourne Ebden lived in a mansion he had built at the top end of Collins Street.

== Political career ==
Under the New South Wales Constitution Act 1842, the electors of the Port Phillip District were able to elect six of the thirty-six members of the Legislative Council of New South Wales (five for Port Phillip and one for Town of Melbourne). At the first elections on 1 June 1843, Ebden was comfortably elected as one of the five, with the most votes of any Port Phillip candidate. He resigned on 31 March 1844, but was elected again on 1 March 1848, only to resign again on 20 June of that year, since he "could no longer lend himself to the perpetration of what was only a farce". Ebden was nevertheless elected for a third time on 1 June 1850, and remained a member until the separation of Port Phillip District from New South Wales to form the new Colony of Victoria on 1 July 1851.

In either 1847 or 1848, Ebden married Tamar Harding; the couple would later have two daughters and one son.

In July 1851 Ebden was made auditor-general in the new independent government of Victoria, which entitled him to a seat in the Legislative Council of Victoria. While little is known about the operation of the Audit Office at the time (and in particular, the division of responsibilities between that department and the Treasury is unclear) he seems to have been broadly responsible for every aspect of public finance in the new colony. The commencement of the Victorian gold rush, with the consequent difficulties of auditing state revenues generated from gold and the explosion in necessary public works expenditure, was the most notable feature of Ebden's time as Auditor-General. Ebden, along with Attorney-General William Stawell, was a well-regarded performer among the early government officers, but did not work well with Lieutenant-Governor La Trobe, and was excluded from the Executive Council. Ebden resigned in October 1852 after seemingly becoming disaffected with the direction of the government, and becoming "tired of having responsibility without power".

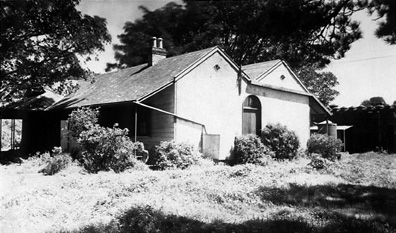
Postcard photograph of Black Rock House, c. 1920.

In 1854 Ebden travelled to England, returning in 1856. Later that year he arranged for the construction of a holiday house, Black Rock House, which was completed in 1858; it was located near Brighton (at what is now Ebden Avenue in Black Rock). At one point Ebden rented the house for six months to the Governor of Victoria, Sir Henry Barkly.

Also in 1856, Ebden stood for election to the newly established Legislative Assembly of Victoria in the district of Melbourne. Linked to the faction of John O'Shanassy, which sought to position itself as something of an opposition to the incumbent government of William Haines, but Ebden failed to be elected; indeed, he finished last. In March 1857 however, he was elected in the district of Brighton, and was Treasurer of Victoria under Haines' second government.

Ebden maintained his pastoralist interests alongside his parliamentary career. In the late 1850s he owned nearly 500,000 acres (200,000 ha) near Kerang. In 1858 he and his son-in-law subdivided the 370,000 acres (150,000 ha) Reedy Lake run near Swan Hill, selling one lot to Thomas Browne for £24,000; serendipitously the exorbitant price seems to have pushed Browne into insolvency, prompting him to commence his literary career under the pen-name Rolf Boldrewood.

Ebden was chairman of the St Kilda & Brighton Railway Company.

Ebden was aligned with Premier William Nicholson following the 1859 election, but declined to join Nicholson's ministry on the basis that his perceived views on land reform would jeopardise the passage of Nicholson's land reform legislation (which ultimately became the Land Act 1860). He reconciled with O'Shanassy in 1860, and after the defeat of the Nicholson government in November of that year, the two provided a base of conservative support for a more radical ministry led by Richard Heales, who succeeded Nicholson as Premier. However, they provided Heales with little real support, and indeed Ebden resigned from the Legislative Assembly in May 1861 and returned to England.

== Late life and legacy ==
Ebden remained in England for the next five years, but was in poor health for much of that time, suffering asthma. He became healthier upon his return to Victoria, but at the Melbourne Club on 28 October 1867 he died. He left his estate, worth approximately £100,000, to his wife and his children.

New South Wales Legislative Council
New creation	Member for Port Phillip; June 1843 – March 1844; With: Thomas Walker; Charles Nicholson; Alexander Thomson; John Dunmore Lang	Succeeded by Thomas Mitchell; Adolphus Young (Two vacancies filled)
Preceded by Edward Brewster	Member for Port Phillip; March 1848 – June 1848; With: Maurice O'Connell; Charles Nicholson; John Foster; John Airey	Succeeded by Lauchlan Mackinnon; James Williamson; John Dickson; Edward Curr; James Palmer
Preceded by Lauchlan Mackinnon; John Foster	Member for Port Phillip; June 1850 – June 1851; With: William Macarthur; John Dickson; Henry Moor; William Mercer	Colony of Victoria established
Victorian Legislative Council
New parliament	Nominated Member & Auditor-General; July 1851 – October 1852	Succeeded by Hugh Childers
Victorian Legislative Assembly
Preceded by Jonathan Were	Member for Brighton; March 1857 – May 1861	Succeeded by George Higinbotham
Preceded by John Foster	Treasurer of Victoria; 29 April 1857 – 10 March 1858	Succeeded by George Harker
