= Sir Charles Nicholson, 1st Baronet, of Luddenham =

Australian politician

Sir Charles Nicholson 1st Baronet of Luddenham
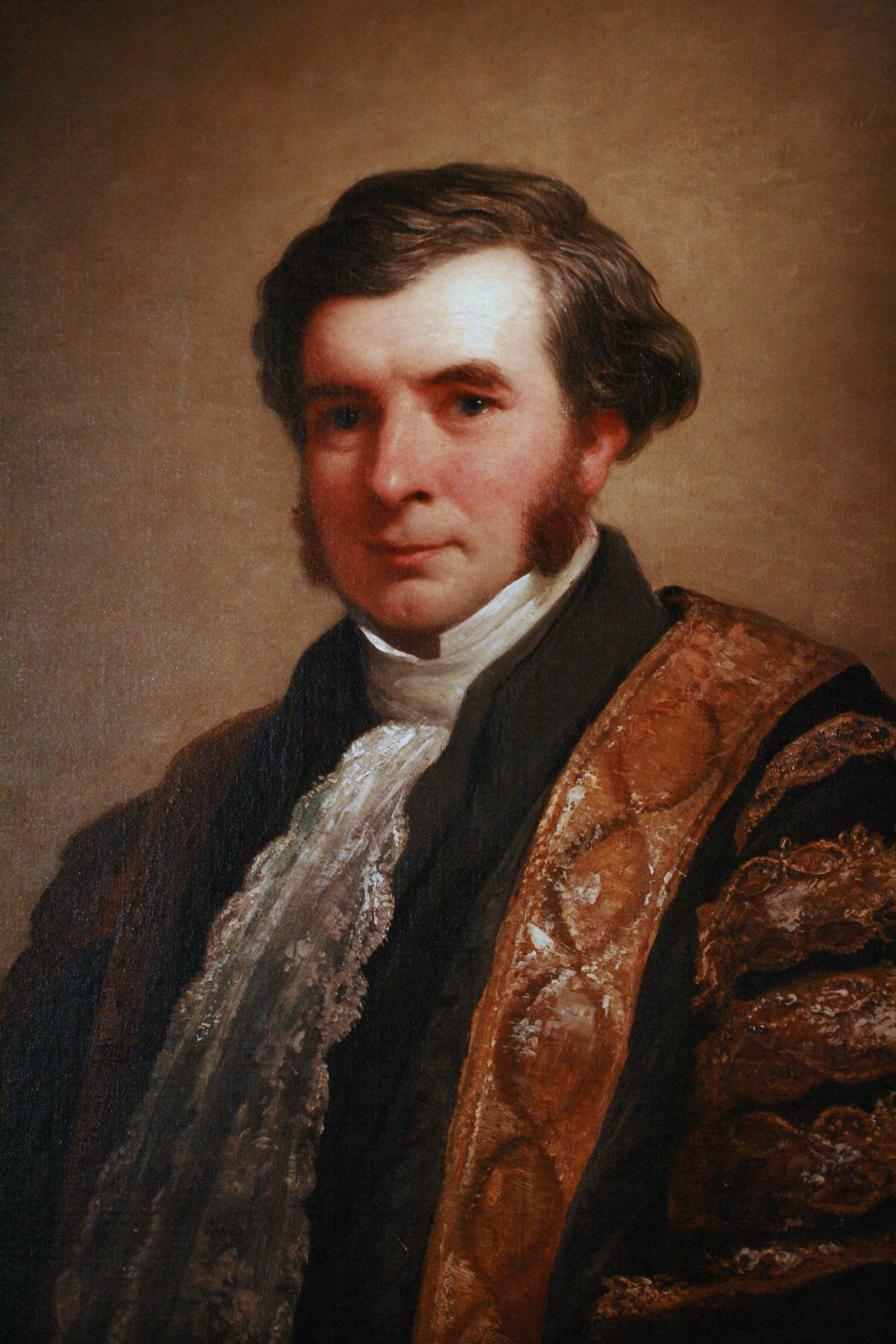
- Sir Charles Nicholson as chancellor of the University of Sydney, c. 1850

Speaker of the New South Wales Legislative Council
- In office 1 June 1843 – 20 June 1848
- In office 15 May 1849 – 30 June 1851
- In office 14 October 1851 – 29 February 1856
- Preceded by: New title
- Succeeded by: Sir Alfred Stephen

President of the Queensland Legislative Council
- In office 22 May 1860 – 26 August 1860
- Preceded by: New title
- Succeeded by: Sir Maurice O'Connell

Member of the New South Wales Legislative Council
- In office 1 June 1843 – 20 June 1848
- In office 1 July 1848 – 30 June 1851
- In office 1 September 1851 – 29 February 1856

Member of the Queensland Legislative Council
- In office 1 May 1860 – 23 June 1863

Personal details
- Born: Isaac Ascough; 23 November 1808 Whitby, Yorkshire, England
- Died: 8 November 1903 (aged 94) Totteridge Grange, Hertfordshire, England
- Spouse: Sarah Elizabeth Keightley (m. 1865)
- Children: Sir Charles Archibald Nicholson, 2nd Baronet (son); Archibald Keightley Nicholson (son); Sir Sydney Hugo Nicholson (son)
- Education: Edinburgh University
- Occupation: Gynaecologist, obstetrician, university chancellor, grazier

Sir Charles Nicholson, 1st Baronet (born Isaac Ascough; 23 November 1808 – 8 November 1903) was an English-Australian politician, university founder, explorer, pastoralist, antiquarian and philanthropist. The Nicholson Museum at the University of Sydney was named after him.

== Early life and family ==
Nicholson was born in Whitby, Yorkshire, the illegitimate and only surviving son of teenager Barbara Ascough (Askew) of Iburndale, and Charles Nicholson of London. He was christened Isaac Ascough. His mother died in 1814, aged 24, and his father died in 1824. His mother was the daughter of a wealthy merchant, J. Ascough from Bedale, Yorkshire, and his grandfather was also named Charles Nicholson, of Cockermouth, Cumberland.

He was educated at Edinburgh University.

== Early career in Australia ==
On 9 October 1833, Nicholson sailed for Sydney as ship's surgeon on the James Harris at the behest of his uncle, William Ascough. Ascough had made a considerable fortune as a ship's captain and owner bringing convicts to the Colony, where he had also become an extensive landowner. Nicholson arrived on 1 May 1834 and set up as a doctor in Sydney on Jamieson Street, Wynyard close to The Rocks. In 1836, William Ascough drowned at sea while sailing from Sydney to his property on the Hawkesbury River. Nicholson was the main beneficiary of his uncle's will and soon began acquiring extensive property in his own right throughout Australia.

In 1841, Nicholson blazed a cart route and shifted half a ton of tobacco from Broulee to the Monaro, in fourteen days. He was planning to return, carrying six bales of wool. William Oldrey, William Sandys Elrington, and Terence Aubrey Murray attempted to raise funds for a private road, from Bellalaba to Broulee, following Nicholson's route to the coast, but it was never built. In 1845, Nicholson bought William Sandys Elrington's estate, 'Mount Elrington', near Braidwood.

In 1843, he was one of the first elected members of the New South Wales Legislative Council as one of the representatives of Port Phillip District until 1848 and then as the representatives of the County of Argyle until 1856. He was elected speaker in 1846.

Explorer Ludwig Leichhardt named a mountain in Queensland after him in 1844.

== Sydney University ==
Nicholson's donation of nearly 1000 artefacts was the genesis of the Nicholson Museum at the University of Sydney, which has since been absorbed into the Chau Chak Wing Museum. A catalogue of the collection was published in 1870 by the curator Edward Reeve.

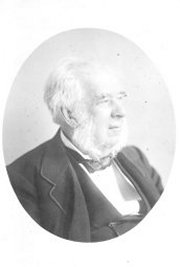
An older Nicholson

== Return to England ==
His eldest son, Charles Archibald Nicholson, the second baronet, became well known as an ecclesiastical architect (his achievements include the west front of St Anne's Cathedral, Belfast). His other sons were Archibald Keightley Nicholson, a stained-glass artist and Sir Sydney Hugo Nicholson, founder of the Royal School of Church Music.

== Death ==
Nicholson died in England on 8 November 1903 shortly before his ninety-fifth birthday.

== Notes ==
New South Wales Legislative Council
First election	Member for Port Phillip; Jun 1843 – Jun 1848; With: T. Walker / M. O'Connell; Lang / Airey; C. Ebden / A. Young / T. Boyd / E. Brewster; A. Thomson / T. Mitchell / B. Boyd / E. Curr / J. Foster	Succeeded by Lauchlan Mackinnon; James Williamson; John Dickson; Edward Curr; James Palmer; Five vacancies filled in Sep 1848
Preceded by William Faithfull	Member for County of Argyle; Jul 1848 – Feb 1856	Council replaced by new parliament
Preceded by Alexander Macleay	Speaker of the Legislative Council; 1846–1856	Succeeded by Sir Alfred Stephen as President of the Legislative Council
Academic offices
Preceded by Edward Hamilton	Chancellor of the University of Sydney; 1854–1862	Succeeded by Francis Merewether
Baronetage of the United Kingdom
New title	Baronet (of Luddenham); 1859–1903	Succeeded by Charles Archibald Nicholson
Parliament of Queensland
New council	President of the Legislative Council; 1860	Succeeded by Sir Maurice O'Connell
