= John Dickson (Australian politician) =

Australian politician

Doctor John Dickson was a politician in colonial New South Wales, a member of the New South Wales Legislative Council and Representative of the Government in the Legislative Council.

Dickson studied medicine at the University of Edinburgh in 1830.

New South Wales Legislative Council
Preceded by Charles Ebden; Maurice O'Connell; Charles Nicholson; John Foster; John Airey	Member for Port Phillip; 1848 – 1851; With: L. Mackinnon / C. Ebden; E. Curr / H. Moor; J. Williamson / W. Macarthur; J. Palmer / J. Foster / W. Mercer	Colony of Victoria established
Political offices
Vacant Title last held by Lyttleton Bayley	Representative of the Government in the Legislative Council; Aug – Sep 1859	Succeeded by Geoffrey Eagar
