= Patrick Grant (Australian politician) =

Australian politician

Patrick Grant (1795−14 May 1855) was an English businessman who was an Australian politician and Police Magistrate. He was the proprietor of the Sun, the True Sun.

== Biography ==
Grant was the eldest son of Lieutenant Colonel Alexander Grant and Jane Hannay.

Politician Henry Hunt brought a libel action against Grant, the True Sun's proprietor, publisher John Bell, and printer John Ager for an article published on 18 December 1832; however, Hunt was awarded damages of one farthing. Grant, Bell and Ager were prosecuted, convicted and confined in 1834 to the King's Bench Prison for advocating tax resistance against the British government's window tax. He was later pardoned.

He was a police magistrate at Maitland, in the Hunter Valley and sub editor of the Sydney Gazette. In 1845 he was elected to the New South Wales Legislative Council; this election was voided, but he was re-elected later that year and served until 1848.

Grant subsequently moved to Redcastle, Scotland and died in London on 16 October 1855 (aged 59–60).

== Marriage and issue ==
Patrick was married to Catherine Sophia Grant, the daughter of Charles Grant and Jane Fraser, they are known to have had the following known issue:

- Alexander Ronald Grant, Canon of Ely
- Robert Grant
- Charles Grant (died 1876)
- Julia Grant
- Matilda Grant
- Flora Sophia Grant

New South Wales Legislative Council
Preceded by D'Arcy Wentworth Jr.	Member for Northumberland Boroughs; 1845 – 1848	Succeeded by Bob Nichols
