= Electoral district of Port Phillip =

Former electorate of the New South Wales Legislative Council

Port Phillip New South Wales—Legislative Council
- Location of the District in 1843. Same as current-day Victoria.
- State: New South Wales
- Created: 1843
- Abolished: 1851
- Namesake: Port Phillip
- Electors: 1,157 (1843)
- Coordinates: 37°S 144°E

The Electoral district of Port Phillip was an electorate of the New South Wales Legislative Council before it became the separate colony of Victoria (Australia) on 1 July 1851. At the time, some members of the council were elected and the balance were appointed by the Governor. The Town of Melbourne returned one member while the Port Phillip district, which covered the rest of what became Victoria after its separation in 1851, returned five members.

== History ==
Settlers of the Port Phillip District had wanted representation in the New South Wales Legislative Council for some time. In 1843 representatives were elected; "But the colonists were not satisfied with government from and by Sydney".

On 1 July 1851, the District was separated from New South Wales under provisions of the Australian Constitutions Act 1850 (13 & 14 Vict. c. 59 (Imp)), and became the Colony of Victoria and the Victorian Legislative Council was created.

== Members ==
Member 1	Term	Member 2	Term	Member 3	Term	Member 4	Term	Member 5	Term
Charles Ebden	1 Jun 1843 – 31 Mar 1844	Thomas Walker	1 Jun 1843 – 31 Jul 1845	Charles Nicholson	1 June 1843 – 20 Jun 1848	Alexander Thomson	1 Jun 1843 – 31 Mar 1844	John Lang	1 June 1843 – 1 Nov 1847
Adolphus Young	1 Apr 1844 – 31 Jul 1845	Thomas Walker	1 Jun 1843 – 31 Jul 1845	Charles Nicholson	1 June 1843 – 20 Jun 1848	Sir Thomas Mitchell	1 Apr 1844 – 31 Aug 1844	John Lang	1 June 1843 – 1 Nov 1847
Adolphus Young	1 Apr 1844 – 31 Jul 1845	Thomas Walker	1 Jun 1843 – 31 Jul 1845	Charles Nicholson	1 June 1843 – 20 Jun 1848	Benjamin Boyd	1 Sep 1844 – 1 Aug 1845	John Lang	1 June 1843 – 1 Nov 1847
Thomas Boyd	1 Aug 1845 – 11 Dec 1845	Maurice O'Connell	1 Aug 1845 – 20 Jun 1848	Charles Nicholson	1 June 1843 – 20 Jun 1848	Edward Curr	1 Sep 1845 – 31 May 1846	John Lang	1 June 1843 – 1 Nov 1847
Edward Brewster	1 Jan 1846 – 1 Feb 1848	Maurice O'Connell	1 Aug 1845 – 20 Jun 1848	Charles Nicholson	1 June 1843 – 20 Jun 1848	John Foster	1 Jun 1846 – 20 Jun 1848	John Lang	1 June 1843 – 1 Nov 1847
Charles Ebden	1 Mar 1848 – 20 Jun 1848	Maurice O'Connell	1 Aug 1845 – 20 Jun 1848	Charles Nicholson	1 June 1843 – 20 Jun 1848	John Foster	1 Jun 1846 – 20 Jun 1848	John Airey	22 Dec 1847 – 20 Jun 1848
Lauchlan Mackinnon	1 Sep 1848 – 31 May 1850	James Williamson	1 Sep 1848 – 31 Jan 1849	John Dickson	1 Sep 1848 – 30 Jun 1851	Edward Curr	1 Sep 1848 – 31 May 1849	James Palmer	1 Sep 1848 – 31 May 1849
Lauchlan Mackinnon	1 Sep 1848 – 31 May 1850	William Macarthur	1 Feb 1849 – 30 Jun 1851	John Dickson	1 Sep 1848 – 30 Jun 1851	John Foster	1 Jun 1849 – 31 May 1850	Henry Moor	1 Jul 1849 – 30 Jun 1851
Charles Ebden	1 Jun 1850 – 30 Jun 1851	William Macarthur	1 Feb 1849 – 30 Jun 1851	John Dickson	1 Sep 1848 – 30 Jun 1851	William Mercer	1 Jun 1850 – 30 Jun 1851	Henry Moor	1 Jul 1849 – 30 Jun 1851

== Election results ==
=== 1843 ===
1843 New South Wales colonial election, 20 June: Port Phillip
Candidate	Votes	%
Charles Ebden	228	19.69
Thomas Walker	217	18.74
Charles Nicholson	206	17.79
Alexander Thomson	184	15.89
John Dunmore Lang	166	14.34
Sir Thomas Mitchell	157	13.56
Total votes	1,158	100.00

=== 1844 (1) ===
Charles Ebden and Alexander Thomson resigned in March 1844.

Port Phillip by-election 23 April 1844
Candidate	Votes	%
Sir Thomas Mitchell	195	44.10
Adolphus Young	134	31.68
Maurice O'Connell	94	22.22
Total votes	423	100

=== 1844 (2) ===
Sir Thomas Mitchell, while an elected member was also the Surveyor General. He was criticised by Governor Sir George Gipps for not supporting the government by absenting himself from the Legislative Council when he did not agree with government measures. Mitchell chose to resign his seat.

Port Phillip by-election 17 September 1844
Candidate	Votes	%
Benjamin Boyd	unopposed	

=== 1845 (1) ===
Thomas Walker resigned on 31 July 1845.

Port Phillip by-election 7 August 1845
Candidate	Votes	%
Maurice O'Connell	show of hands	
Archibald Boyd		

=== 1845 (2) ===
Adolphus Young resigned on 31 July 1845.

Port Phillip by-election 7 August 1845
Candidate	Votes	%
Thomas Boyd	unopposed	

=== 1845 (3) ===
Benjamin Boyd resigned on 1 August 1845.

Port Phillip by-election 26 September 1845
Candidate	Votes	%
Edward Curr	50	81.97
Neil Black	11	8.03
Total votes	61	100

=== 1846 (1) ===
Thomas Boyd resigned in December 1845.

Port Phillip by-election 23 January 1846
Candidate	Votes	%
Edward Brewster	unopposed	

=== 1846 (2) ===
Edward Curr resigned in May 1846.

Port Phillip by-election 29 June 1846
Candidate	Votes	%
John Foster	unopposed	

=== 1847 ===
John Lang was absent for two successive sessions of the council and his seat was declared vacant in November 1847.

Port Phillip by-election 22 December 1847
Candidate	Votes	%
John Airey	unopposed	

=== 1848 By-election ===
Edward Brewster resigned in February 1848.

Port Phillip by-election 15 March 1848
Candidate	Votes	%
Charles Ebden	unopposed	

=== 1848 ===
1848 New South Wales colonial election, 3 October: Port Phillip
Candidate	Votes	%
Lauchlan Mackinnon (elected 1)	239	17
James Williamson (elected 2)	234	16
John Dickson (elected 3)	232	16
James Palmer (elected 4)	226	16
Edward Curr (elected 5)	189	13
The Duke of Wellington, Lord Palmerston, Lord Brougham, Lord John Russell, Sir Robert Peel	58	4
William Macarthur	25	1
Total votes	1,435	100

The original polling day was 27 July; however, no candidates were nominated for Port Phillip as a result of the campaign for independence from New South Wales. A further writ was issued on 25 August.

=== 1849 (1) ===
James Williamson resigned in January 1849.

Port Phillip by-election 27 February 1849
Candidate	Votes	%
William Macarthur	97	90.65
The Duke of Wellington	9	8.41
John Fawkner	1	0.93
Total votes	107	100

=== 1849 (2) ===
Edward Curr resigned in May 1849.

Port Phillip by-election 23 June 1849
Candidate	Votes	%
John Foster	unopposed	

=== 1849 (3) ===
James Palmer resigned in May 1849.

Port Phillip by-election 17 July 1849
Candidate	Votes	%
Henry Moor	unopposed	

=== 1850 ===
Lauchlan Mackinnon and John Foster resigned in May 1850.

Port Phillip by-election 11 June 1850
Candidate	Votes	%
Charles Ebden	421	31.94
William Mercer	401	30.42
John Lang	386	29.29
Lachlan McAlister	110	8.35
Total votes	1,318	100

== See also ==
- Members of the New South Wales Legislative Council, 1843–1851
