= Electoral district of County of Durham =

Former legislative council electoral district of New South Wales, Australia

County of Durham New South Wales—Legislative Council
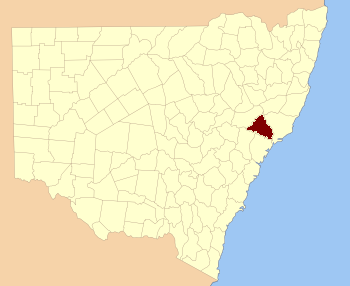
- Durham county in modern New South Wales
- State: New South Wales
- Created: 1843
- Abolished: 1856
- Namesake: Durham County
- Coordinates: 32°S 151°E

The Electoral district of County of Durham was an electorate of the New South Wales Legislative Council at a time when some of its members were elected and the balance were appointed by the Governor. It was named after Durham County, which lies on the north side of the Hunter River.

It was created by the 1843 Electoral Districts Act and initially returned one member. It returned two members with the expansion of the Council in 1851 to 54, 18 to be appointed and 36 elected. In 1856 the unicameral Legislative Council was abolished and replaced with an elected Legislative Assembly and an appointed Legislative Council. The district was represented by the Legislative Assembly electorate of Durham

== Members ==
| Election | Member | Term | | |
|---|---|---|---|---|
| 1843 | Richard Windeyer | Jun 1843 – Dec 1847 | | |
| 1848 by | Stuart Donaldson | Feb 1848 – Jan 1853 | | |
| 1848 | Stuart Donaldson | Feb 1848 – Jan 1853 | | |
| 1849 by | Stuart Donaldson | Feb 1848 – Jan 1853 | Member | Term |
| 1851 | Stuart Donaldson | Feb 1848 – Jan 1853 | Charles Cowper | Sep 1851 – Feb 1856 |
| 1853 by | Alexander Park | Feb 1853 – Feb 1856 | Charles Cowper | Sep 1851 – Feb 1856 |

== Election results ==
=== 1843 ===
1843 New South Wales colonial election, 24 June: County of Durham
| Candidate | Votes | % |
|---|---|---|
| Richard Windeyer | 122 | 49.19 |
| William Ogilvie | 71 | 28.63 |
| Andrew Lang | 55 | 22.18 |
| Total votes | 248 | 100.00 |

=== 1848 by-election ===
Richard Windeyer died in December 1847.

County of Durham by-election 19 February 1848
| Candidate | Votes | % |
|---|---|---|
| Stuart Donaldson (elected) | 113 | 59.47 |
| Alexander Park | 77 | 40.53 |
| Total votes | 190 | 100 |

=== 1848 ===
1848 New South Wales colonial election, 26 July: County of Durham
| Candidate | Votes | % |
|---|---|---|
| Stuart Donaldson (elected) | Show of Hands | |
| Andrew Lang | | |

On 26 July 1848, the day prescribed for nominations, Stuart Donaldson and Andrew Lang were nominated. A show of hands was in favour of Donaldson and Lang demanded a poll. The returning officer had neglected to make any preparations for a poll and so declared Donaldson elected. Donaldson attempted to resign on 16 August. The election was declared void by the court of disputed returns and a new writ issued.

=== 1849 by-election ===
On 26 July 1848, the day prescribed for nominations, Stuart Donaldson and Andrew Lang were nominated. A show of hands was in favour of Donaldson and Lang demanded a poll. The returning officer had neglected to make any preparations for a poll and so declared Donaldson elected. Donaldson attempted to resign on 16 August. The election was declared void by the court of disputed returns and a new writ issued.

County of Durham by-election 25 June 1849
| Candidate | Votes | % |
|---|---|---|
| Stuart Donaldson (elected) | Unopposed | |

=== 1851 ===
1851 New South Wales colonial election, 24 September: County of Durham
| Candidate | Votes | % |
|---|---|---|
| Stuart Donaldson | 239 | 34.94 |
| Charles Cowper | 231 | 33.77 |
| Adolphus Young | 169 | 24.71 |
| Edward Hunt | 45 | 6.58 |
| Total votes | 684 | 100 |

=== 1853 by-election ===
Stuart Donaldson resigned in January 1853.

County of Durham by-election 28 February 1853
| Candidate | Votes | % |
|---|---|---|
| Alexander Park (elected) | unopposed | |

== See also ==
- Members of the New South Wales Legislative Council, 1843–1851 and 1851-1856
