= Hastings Elwin =

Australian politician (1776–1852)

Hastings Elwin KC (1776 – 31 August 1852) was an English-born Australian politician.

He was the son of Hastings Elwin and Elizabeth Diana Woolhead. A minor aristocrat, he was lord of the manor of Booton in Norfolk, and his friends included the Marquess of Lansdowne and the poet Thomas Moore. He was a founding member of the Bath Royal Literary and Scientific Institution and a member of the Anacreontic Society. He was a barrister, and spent time in Antigua as advocate general. In 1803 he married Margaret Matilda Ottley; she died in 1826 and he remarried Mary Anne Cole in 1829. Having moved to New South Wales, he was a member of the New South Wales Legislative Council from 1843 to 1844, during which time he was also Chairman of Committees. Elwin died at Camperdown in 1852.
