= Alexander Park (politician) =

Scottish-born Australian politician

Alexander Park (1808 – 21 July 1873) was a Scottish-born land owner and politician in colonial New South Wales, Australia.

He was born in Selkirk to attorney Alexander Park and Alice Veitch. He migrated to New South Wales in 1826 and was given a land grant in the Paterson district. He owned large vineyards and probably also pastoral land. He was elected unopposed as a member of the New South Wales Legislative Council for the seat of County of Durham at a by-election in February 1853 and served until the parliament was re-constituted in 1856. He stood for the three member district of Durham at the 1856 election for the Legislative Assembly however he received only 209 votes (9.7%). In 1858 he was appointed to the Legislative Council for the balance of the initial five-year term, ending in 1861. He was appointed again in 1868, serving until his death.

Park was the largest land owner in the Paterson district, including vineyards at Lewinsbrook, where he died on 21 July 1873 (aged 65).
