= William Mercer (Australian politician) =

Australian politician

Major William Drummond Mercer (1796–1871) was a British Army officer, landowner, pastoralist and politician in colonial New South Wales.

Mercer was the only surviving nephew of George Mercer. Major Mercer, having retired from the 16th Lancers, departed Calcutta and arrived in Hobart in March 1838 along with his cousin, Lieutenant George Duncan Mercer. Mercer was a pastoralist with his two cousins, George Duncan Mercer and John Henry Mercer in properties near Geelong. Mercer was elected to the district of Port Phillip in the New South Wales Legislative Council in June 1850. He held that seat until it was abolished prior to the creation of Victoria (Australia) as a separate colony. Mercer returned to Scotland and settled in Perthshire.

New South Wales Legislative Council
Preceded by John Foster; Lauchlan Mackinnon	Member for Port Phillip; 1850–1851; Served alongside: Charles Ebden, Henry Moor; John Dickson, William Macarthur	Colony of Victoria established
