= Maurice Charles O'Connell (Australian politician) =

Australian politician (1812–1879)

The Hon Sir Maurice O'Connell
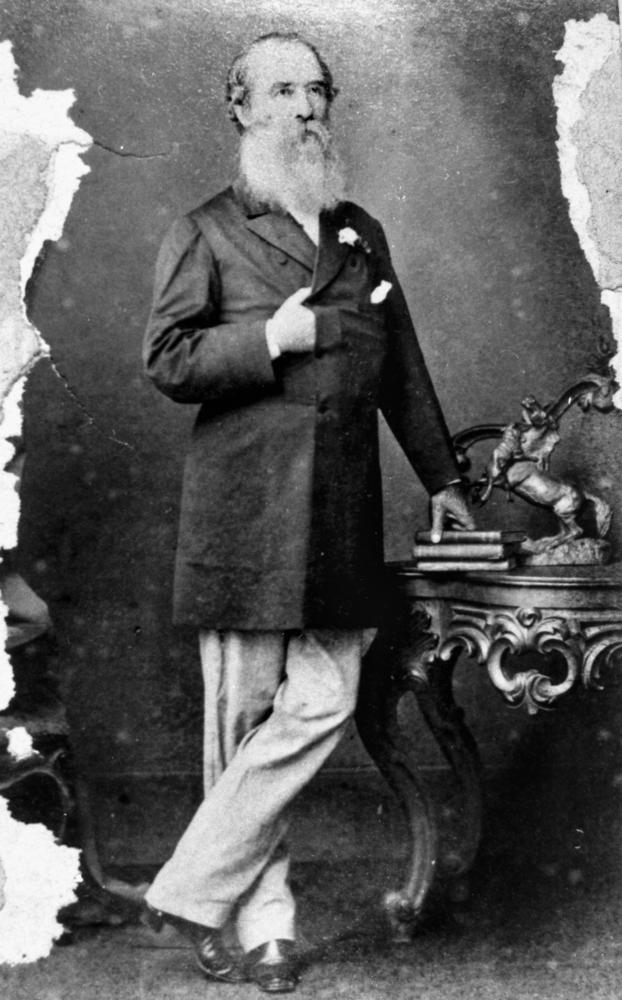
- Maurice Charles O'Connell in 1860

President of the Queensland Legislative Council
- In office 27 August 1860 – 23 March 1879
- Preceded by: Sir Charles Nicholson
- Succeeded by: Sir Joshua Peter Bell

Member of the New South Wales Legislative Council
- In office 1 August 1845 – 20 June 1848

Member of the Queensland Legislative Council
- In office 1 May 1860 – 23 March 1879

Personal details
- Born: Maurice Charles O'Connell; 13 January 1812 Sydney, Australia
- Died: 23 March 1879 (aged 67) Parliament House, Brisbane, Australia
- Resting place: Toowong Cemetery
- Spouse: Eliza Emiline Le Geyt (m.1835 d.1903)
- Relations: Sir Maurice O'Connell (father), Mary Bligh (mother), William Bligh (grandfather), William O'Connell (nephew)
- Occupation: Army officer
- Known for: President of the Queensland Legislative Council

Sir Maurice Charles O'Connell (13 January 1812 – 23 March 1879) was a Queensland pioneer and president of the Queensland Legislative Council.

== Early life ==
O'Connell was born at Sydney in 1812. His father was Sir Maurice Charles O'Connell, his mother was Mary (née Bligh, formerly Putland) a daughter of Governor William Bligh. He was educated at the high school, Edinburgh; Dublin and Paris.

== Army career ==
O'Connell entered the army as an ensign at 16 and joined the 73rd Regiment at Gibraltar. In 1835 he volunteered for foreign service as colonel with the British Legion in Spain, which he himself had raised in the county of Cork and other parts of Munster, to sustain the cause of the Spanish Queen and constitution against the insurgent Carlists. Later on he became Deputy Adjutant-General, and ultimately succeeded Sir De Lacy Evans as general of brigade in command of the British Auxiliary Legion in Spain. The Legion was disbanded on 8 December 1837, after taking heavy casualties during the battle of Andoain. Sir Maurice O'Connell was rewarded for his services by having the knighthood of several Spanish orders conferred upon him.

On his return to England he was appointed to the 51st Regiment, and afterwards becoming captain in the 28th. When the 28th was recalled to England, Sir Maurice sold out, and engaged in pastoral pursuits.

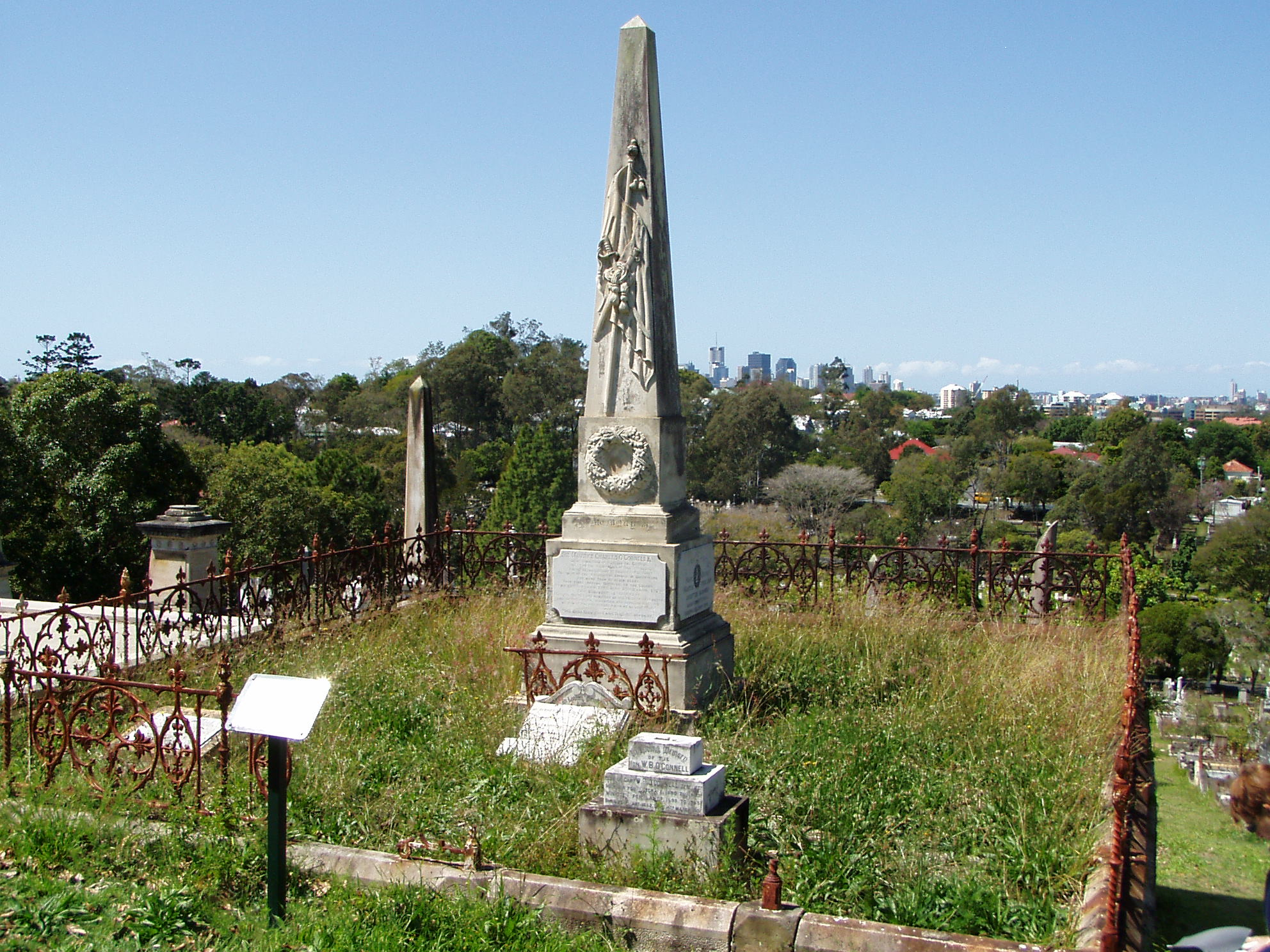
Monument at the grave of Maurice Charles O'Connell.

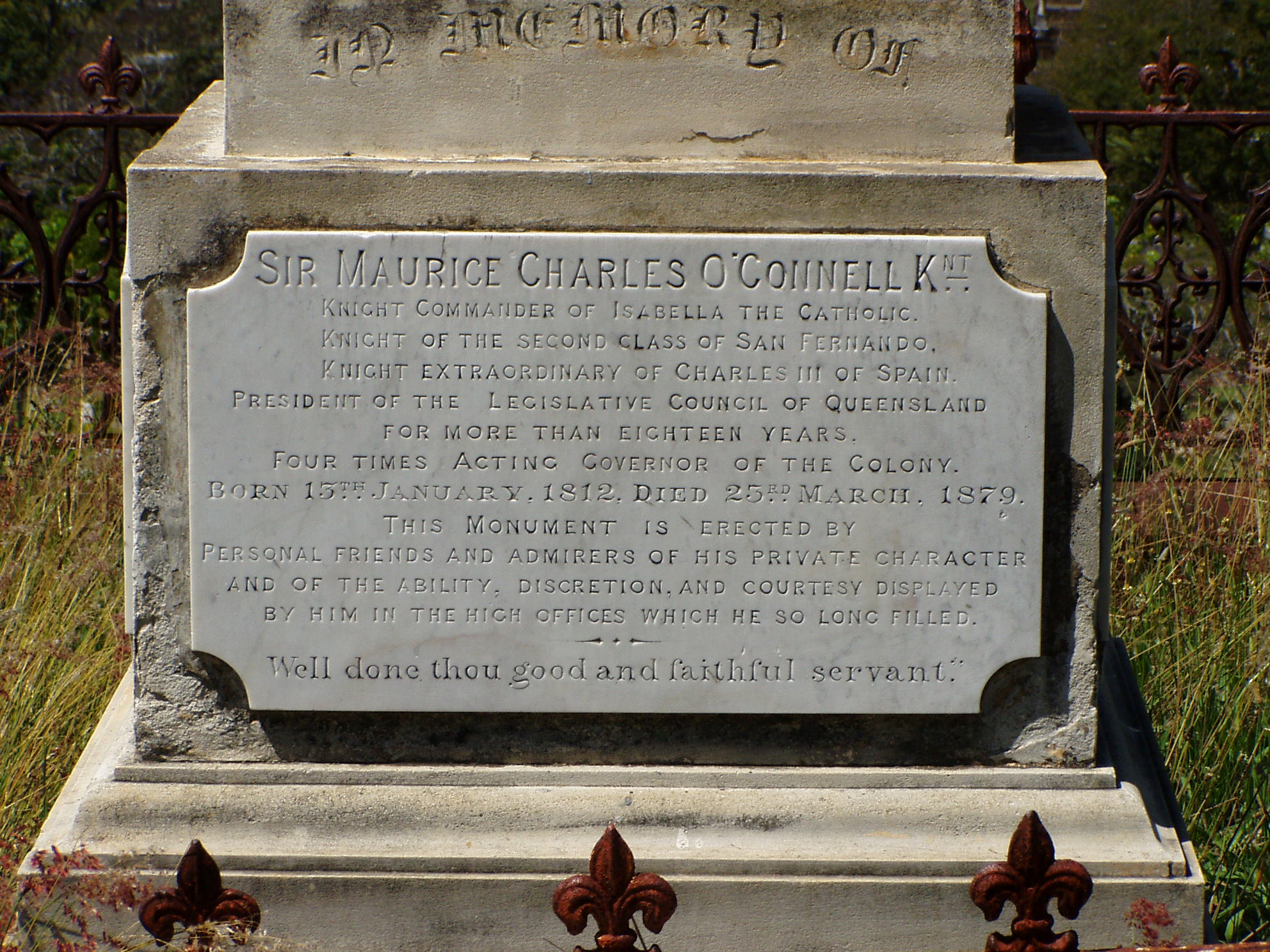

== Political career ==
O'Connell was elected a member of the New South Wales Legislative Council in August 1845 for the electoral district of Port Phillip.

In 1863, O'Connell was one of the founders and original trustees of the Queensland Turf Club, having arranged a land grant of 322 acres of land at Eagle Farm in Brisbane for the purpose of horse racing, now known as the Eagle Farm Racecourse. The other trustees were John Frederick McDougall and George Harris (all three were Members of the Queensland Legislative Council).

In 1865 O'Connell, Augustus Charles Gregory and John Douglas applied for a special grant of land to erect a Masonic Hall in Brisbane. This was granted on 15 January 1865.

== Late life and legacy ==
O'Connell was knighted in 1871.

O'Connell died of cancer in Brisbane on 23 March 1879 at Queensland Parliament House. He was buried in Toowong Cemetery.

== Family ==
O'Connell married in 1835 Eliza Emeline Le Geyt, daughter of Colonel Philip Le Geyt, of Jersey. During the 1901 visit to Australia of the Duke and Duchess of Cornwall and York (later King George V and Queen Mary), the royal couple had a special interview with Lady O'Connell, where she told of her early colonial experiences. Lady O'Connell died in Brisbane on 8 January 1903, almost 90 years old.

New South Wales Legislative Council
Preceded by Thomas Walker, Adolphus Young	Member for Port Phillip; 1845–1848; Served alongside: Thomas Boyd / Edward Brewster / Charles Ebden, Charles Nicholson, Edward Curr / John Foster, John Lang / John Airey	Succeeded by Lauchlan Mackinnon, James Williamson, John Dickson, Edward Curr, James Palmer
Parliament of Queensland
Preceded by Charles Nicholson	President of the Queensland Legislative Council; 1860–1879	Succeeded by Joshua Peter Bell
