= Thomas Boyd (Australian politician) =

Australian politician

Thomas Elder Boyd (1802 – 12 October 1860) was a Scottish-born banker and politician in colonial Australia, member of the New South Wales Legislative Council in 1845.

Boyd was born in Perth, Scotland, the son of James Boyd. In 1842, Boyd was the manager of the Melbourne branch of the Union Bank of Australia, in January 1854 he became manager of the Colonial Bank.

On 1 August 1845, Boyd was elected to the New South Wales Legislative Council as member for Port Phillip District (later to become the separate colony of Victoria). Boyd left the Council on 11 December 1845.

Boyd died in Melbourne on 12 October 1860. He had married Jessie Small, in Dundee, Scotland c. 1831 and to Sarah Kennedy Young, in Edinburgh, Scotland in 1848.

New South Wales Legislative Council
Preceded by Adolphus Young; Thomas Walker (Two seats vacated)	Member for Port Phillip; 1845; Served alongside: Edward Curr, Charles Nicholson, Maurice O'Connell, John Dunmore Lang	Succeeded by Edward Brewster
