= Electoral district of Town of Melbourne =

Former legislative council electoral district of New South Wales, Australia

Town of Melbourne New South Wales—Legislative Council
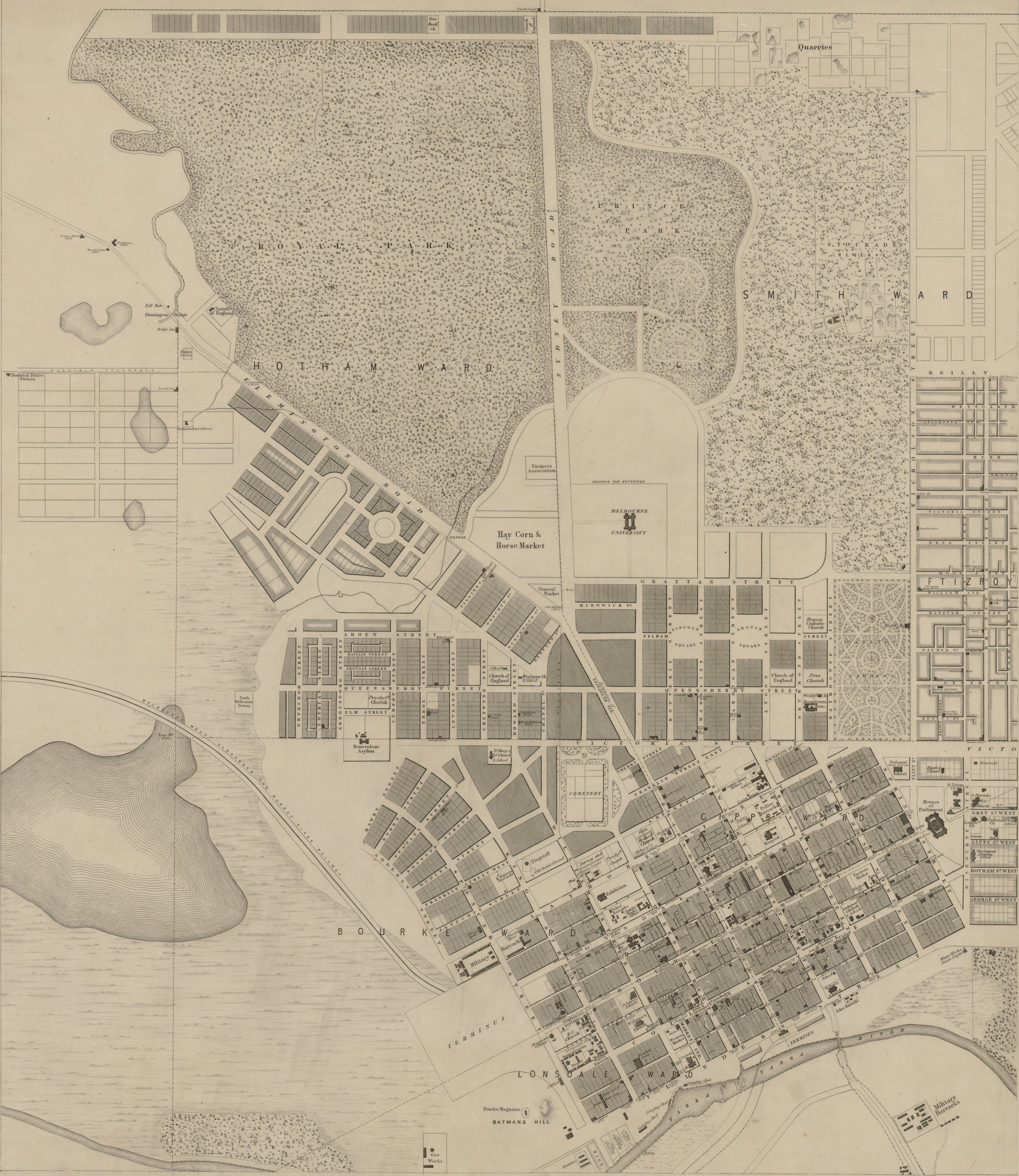
- Melbourne, 1855
- State: New South Wales
- Created: 1843
- Abolished: 1851
- Namesake: Melbourne
- Electors: 556 (in 1843)
- Coordinates: 37°49′S 144°58′E

The Electoral district of Town of Melbourne (later known as Electoral district of City of Melbourne) was an electorate of the New South Wales Legislative Council before it became part of the Colony of Victoria on 1 July 1851.

== History ==
Settlers of the Port Phillip District had wanted representation in the New South Wales Legislative Council for some time. In 1843 a representative for the Town of Melbourne (and five members for the Electoral district of Port Phillip). were elected; "But the colonists were not satisfied with government from and by Sydney".

On 1 July 1851, the Port Phillip district (which included Melbourne) was separated from New South Wales under provisions of the Australian Constitutions Act 1850 (13 & 14 Vict. c. 59 (Imp)), and became the Colony of Victoria and the Victorian Legislative Council was created.

== Members ==
Town of Melbourne
Member	Term	Ref
Henry Condell	1 Jun 1843 – 1 Feb 1844	
Joseph Robinson	12 Mar 1844 – 20 Jun 1848	
City of Melbourne
Earl Grey	1 Jul 1848 – 31 Oct 1850	
William Westgarth	1 Nov 1850 – 20 Jun 1851	

== Election results ==
=== 1843 ===
1843 New South Wales colonial election, 17 June: Town of Melbourne
Candidate	Votes	%
Henry Condell	295	53.06
Edward Curr	261	46.94
Total votes	556	100.00

=== 1844 ===
Condell resigned in February 1844.

1844 Town of Melbourne by-election 12 March
Candidate	Votes	%
Joseph Robinson	unopposed	

=== 1848 ===
1848 New South Wales colonial election, 26 July: City of Melbourne
Candidate	Votes	%
Earl Grey (elected)	295	74
John Foster	102	26
Total votes	397	100

Earl Grey, the Colonial Secretary in London, had never set foot in the colony and there was no suggestion he met the property requirement for election. He was nominated and elected as part of the campaign for independence, protesting against government by New South Wales.

=== 1850 ===
As Earl Grey had never set foot in the colony, he did not attend the Legislative Council and his seat was vacated by his absence on 31 October 1850.

1850 City of Melbourne by-election 7 November
Candidate	Votes	%
William Westgarth	unopposed	
