= James Williamson (New South Wales politician) =

Australian pastoralist and politician

James Williamson (1811 – 8 March 1881) was a pastoralist and politician in colonial Australia, a member of the New South Wales Legislative Council, and later, the New South Wales Legislative Assembly.

Williamson was born in Edinburgh, Scotland, and arrived in Sydney around 1837. Williamson was elected to the New South Wales Legislative Council as member for District of Port Phillip on 1 September 1848, a position he held until 31 January 1849. Williamson was elected to the New South Wales Legislative Assembly as member for Electoral district of Gloucester and Macquarie on 10 February 1858, holding the seat until 11 April 1859.

Williamson died in Burwood, New South Wales, on 8 March 1881.

New South Wales Legislative Council
Preceded by Charles Ebden; Maurice O'Connell; Charles Nicholson; John Foster; John Airey	Member for Port Phillip; 1848–1849; Served alongside: Edward Curr, James Palmer, John Dickson, Lauchlan Mackinnon	Succeeded by William Macarthur
New South Wales Legislative Assembly
Preceded by Thomas Barker	Member for Gloucester and Macquarie; 1858–1859	seat abolished
