= James Frederick Palmer =

Australian politician

Sir James Frederick Palmer
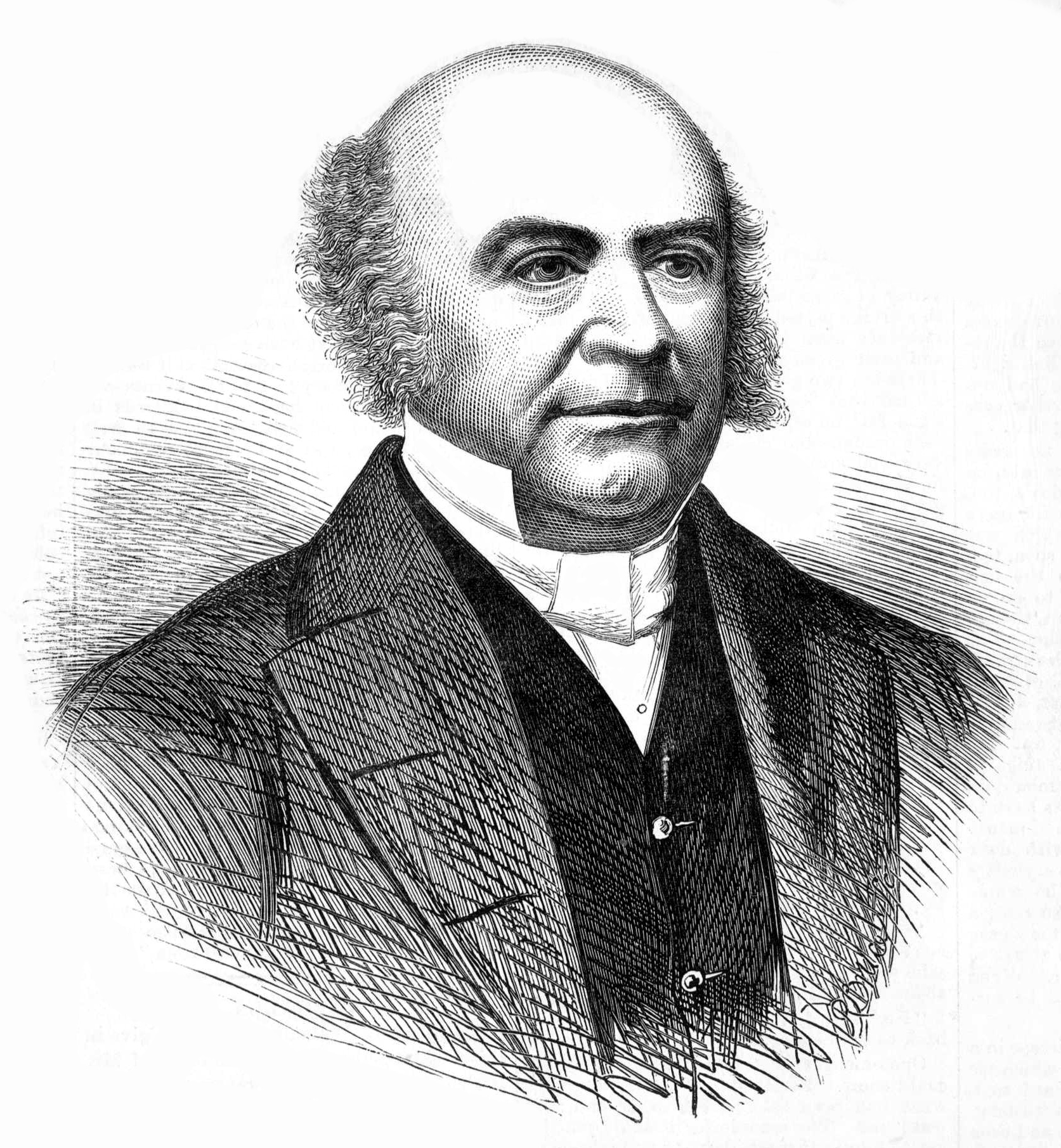
- 1871 engraving

1st President of the Victorian Legislative Council
- In office November 1856 – September 1870
- Succeeded by: Sir William H. F. Mitchell

3rd Mayor of Melbourne
- In office 1845–1846
- Preceded by: Henry Moor
- Succeeded by: Henry Moor

Personal details
- Born: 7 June 1803 Torrington, United Kingdom
- Died: 23 April 1871 (aged 67) Melbourne, Australia

Sir James Frederick Palmer (7 June 1803 – 23 April 1871) was a medical practitioner, Victorian pioneer, first President of the Victorian Legislative Council and Mayor of Melbourne.

== Early life ==
Palmer was born in Great Torrington, Devonshire, England, the fourth son of the Rev. John Palmer (1752–1827) (a nephew of Sir Joshua Reynolds), and his wife Jane (1772–1843), a daughter of William Johnson. He was trained in medicine, practised in London, and was surgeon at St Thomas's hospital. In 1824 he became a house surgeon at St George's Hospital (M.A.C.S., 1826). In 1835–37 he edited a four-volume edition of the Works of John Hunter, the anatomist. He also supplied the glossary to A Dialogue in the Devonshire Dialect (In Three Parts), published in 1837, an abbreviated version of original manuscript published as A Devonshire Dialogue in Four Parts written by his grandmother Mary Palmer in the mid-eighteenth century.

On 21 November 1831 Palmer married Isabella, third daughter of Dr John Gunning, C.B., who was inspector-general of hospitals at the time. After failing to secure two surgical appointments, Palmer migrated to Melbourne, arriving at the end of September 1840.

== Politics ==
Palmer was an early member of the Melbourne City Council and was elected Mayor of Melbourne in 1845. In September 1848 Palmer was elected one of five members for Port Phillip District for the New South Wales Legislative Council, but resigned in June 1849.

Charles La Trobe described him as 'a gentleman by birth, education and profession. Sometimes he pulled against, more often for, but I always respected him as honest'.

Palmer died at Burwood, his estate in Hawthorn, Melbourne, on 23 April 1871.

Preceded by Henry Moor	Mayor of Melbourne; 1845–1846	Succeeded by Henry Moor
New South Wales Legislative Council
Preceded by Charles Ebden; Maurice O'Connell; Charles Nicholson; John Foster; John Airey	Member for Port Phillip; 1848–1849; With: Lauchlan Mackinnon, James Williamson; John Dickson, Edward Curr	Succeeded by John Foster
Victorian Legislative Council
New creation	Member for Normanby, Dundas and Follett; 1851–1856; With: Charles Griffith (from 1853)	Seat abolished
New creation	Member for Western Province; 1856–1870; With: Stephen Henty; C. Vaughan / C. Sladen; A. Cruikshank / H. Miller / J. Strachan; D. Tierney / N. Black	Succeeded by Thomas McKellar
