= John Airey (politician) =

Australian politician

John Moore Cole Airey (c. 1811 – 17 July 1893) was a politician in colonial Australia, member of the New South Wales Legislative Council 1847 to 1848.

Airey was born in London, the second son of Sir George Airey and the Hon. Catherine Talbot, daughter of Margaret O'Reilly Talbot, 1st Baroness Talbot of Malahide. His elder brother was Sir Richard Airey, 1st Baron Airey and his youngest brother was Sir James Talbot Airey. An officer in the Royal Navy, he entered the Navy on 1 January 1821 and became a lieutenant on 13 May 1829. He served on the Medina on the African station and later served in the Mediterranean. He returned to England in 1837.

Airey was elected to the New South Wales Legislative Council as member for Port Phillip on 22 December 1847, and was sworn in on 22 March 1848. The previous occupier of the seat, John Dunmore Lang vacated the seat by absence.

Aireys Inlet in Victoria was named for John Airey who settled in the area in 1842.

Airey became Viconde De Airey of Portugal and died in Lisbon on 17 July 1893.

New South Wales Legislative Council
Preceded by John Dunmore Lang	Member for Port Phillip; 1847–1848; Served alongside: John Foster, Charles Ebden; Maurice O'Connell, Charles Nicholson	Succeeded by Lauchlan Mackinnon; James Williamson; John Dickson; Edward Curr; James Palmer
