= John Foster (Australian politician) =

Australian politician

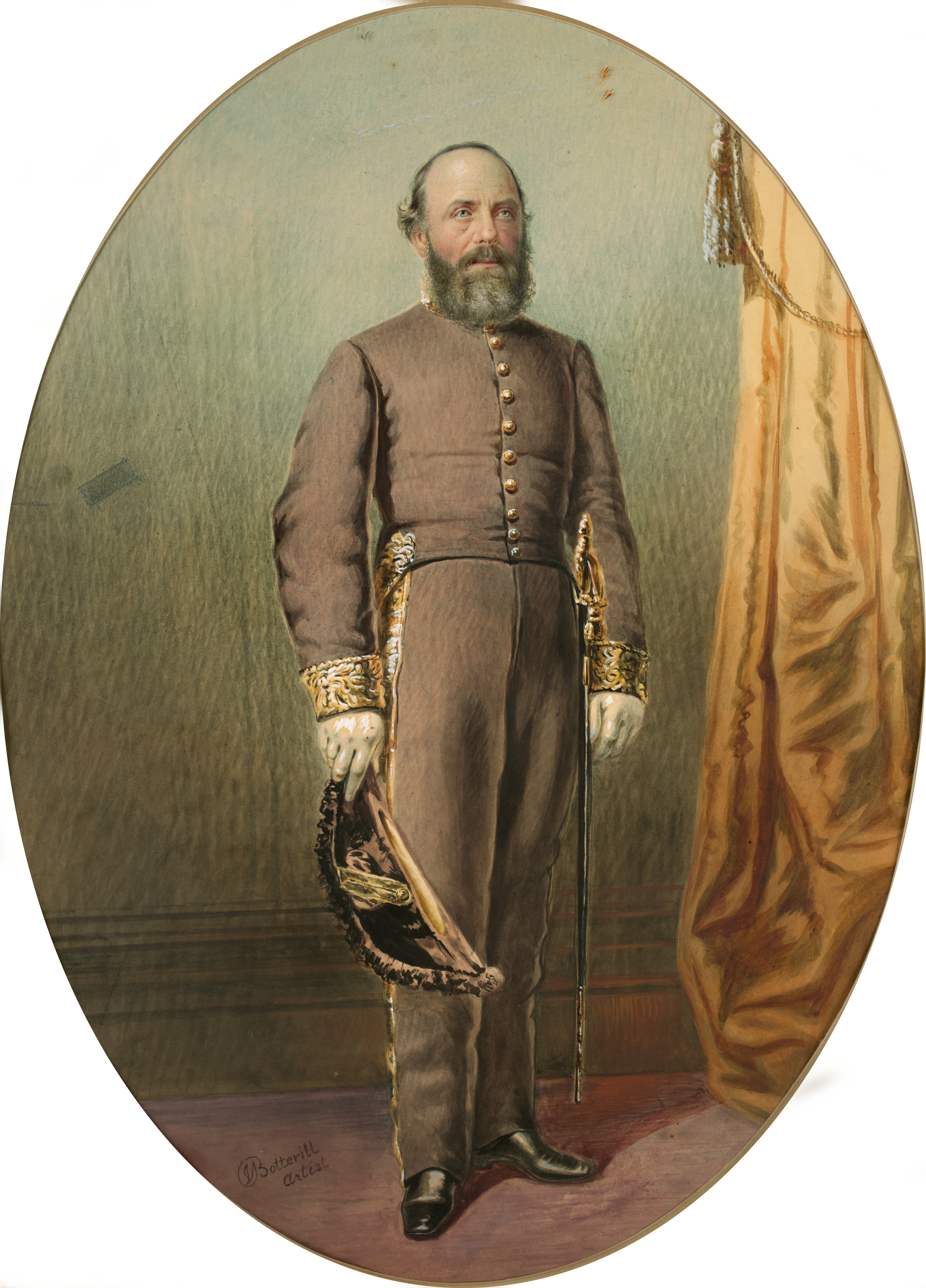
John Forster in 1866

John Leslie Fitzgerald Vesey Foster (19 August 1818 – 3 January 1900), also known as John Leslie Foster-Vesey-Fitzgerald, was a politician in colonial New South Wales and Victoria (Australia).

== Background ==
Foster was the second son of the Hon. John Leslie Foster, Baron of the Court of Exchequer in Ireland, and sometime M.P. for County Louth and Dublin University, by his marriage with the Hon. Letitia Vesey Fitzgerald, sister of William, 2nd Baron Fitzgerald and Vesci. The families of Foster and Fitzgerald have been for generations distinguished in the Church and politics of Ireland, as well as at the bar and in the judicial arena; Mr. Foster's paternal grandfather having been Bishop of Clogher, and his great-grandfather the Right Hon. Anthony Foster, Lord Chief Baron of the Irish Exchequer.

== Early life ==
Foster, was born in Dublin, Ireland, was educated at Trinity College, Dublin, where he graduated B.A. in 1839 with honours, and became a student for the bar, but abandoned the legal profession in favour of a colonial career. The colony of Victoria, then only the Port Phillip District of New South Wales, was his choice, and he landed there on 28 March 1841. At first he devoted himself to pastoral and agricultural pursuits.

== Politics ==
In June 1846 Foster was elected as representative of Port Phillip in the New South Wales Legislative Council, and in July 1848 again came forward for election as one of the six members allotted to Port Phillip. The feeling was, however, so strong that this so-called representation was a mere farce, that the majority were desirous not to elect any more members until separation was secured. In deference to the protests of this party Foster's nomination was withdrawn, but a few days later he was put up as a candidate for the Town of Melbourne, when the non-election party nominated Earl Grey, the Secretary of State for the Colonies, in opposition to him, in the hope that his election would call public attention in England to the grievances of which the colonists complained. In the result Earl Grey was returned by a large majority, and Foster on a subsequent occasion declined to stand. Ultimately, however, he was elected on 1 June 1849, to sit in the Sydney Parliament till he left for Ireland in 1850.

In 1853 Foster was appointed Colonial Secretary of Victoria, following the separation of the Port Phillip District from New South Wales into a new colony of Victoria. Foster held the post of colonial secretary from 20 July 1853 to 4 December 1854, and was a nominated member of the Victorian Legislative Council from August 1853 to December 1854. He was thus virtually Premier during the difficulties caused by the discovery of gold and the rigid enforcement (which he deprecated) of the unpopular diggers' licences. The troubles culminated in the Ballarat riots, of which Foster was made the scapegoat. Aware of the hostile feeling against him, he tendered his resignation to Sir Charles Hotham, by whom it was accepted on the ground that the Queen's government of the colony was endangered, and with the implied pledge that compensation should be given Mr. Foster for the pecuniary loss which he would sustain by his retirement from the public service. Mr. Foster, however, failed in all attempts to obtain any recognition of his claims to compensation. During his tenure of office he introduced and passed the measure which embodied the new constitution of Victoria, and which for the first time included the principle of an elective Upper House.

In 1854 he turned the first sod at Williamstown, Victoria of the great system of railways which has since been developed, and was also instrumental in introducing telegraphs into the colony. Considerable difference of opinion existed as to some of the measures proposed by him; but it is remarkable that every one of them has since been adopted by subsequent legislative action under the new constitution—as, for instance, the abolition of the gold diggers' licence, and the appropriation of the Land Tax to purposes of general utility instead of expending it on immigration. The contracting of loans for public works, which he proposed as the necessary complement of his policy, has since been largely developed. When his conciliatory policy with reference to the diggers' licences was reversed by the Governor, Sir Charles Hotham, and unfortunate results ensued at Ballarat, he retired from office. Subsequent legislative inquiry proved that for such results he was in no way responsible. After the concession of responsible government he sat in the first Victorian Legislative Assembly as member for Williamstown, and acted as Treasurer of Victoria in the first Administration of Sir John O'Shanassy from 11 March to 29 April 1857 soon after which he returned to England, where he since resided.

== Late life and legacy ==
From 1857, Foster lived in England. In accordance with the will of his uncle, the last Lord Fitzgerald and Vesci, he assumed the name of Vesey and Fitzgerald in addition to his own name of Foster, by which latter he was known in Australia.

Foster married in 1851 Emily, daughter of Rev. J. J. Fletcher, D.D., and administered the government of Victoria from May to June 1854, during the interval between the departure of Charles Latrobe and the arrival of Sir Charles Hotham. Several of his relatives achieved distinction in Australia, including his three first cousins—Sir William Foster Stawell, Justice Foster of New South Wales, and Charles Griffith of Victoria.

New South Wales Legislative Council
Preceded by Edward Curr	Member for Port Phillip; Jun 1846 – Jun 1848; With: Maurice O'Connell; John Airey, Charles Ebden; Charles Nicholson	Succeeded by Lauchlan Mackinnon; James Williamson; John Dickson; Edward Curr; James Palmer
Preceded by James Palmer	Member for Port Phillip; Jun 1849 – May 1850; With: William Macarthur; Henry Moor, John Dickson; Lauchlan Mackinnon	Succeeded by William Mercer; Charles Ebden
Victorian Legislative Council
Preceded by William Lonsdale	Nominated member Aug 1853 – Dec 1854	Succeeded by John Owens
Victorian Legislative Assembly
New creation	Member for Williamstown; Nov 1856 – Nov 1857	Succeeded by George Perry
Political offices
Preceded by Charles Sladen	Treasurer of Victoria; 11 Mar 1857 – 29 Apr 1857	Succeeded by Charles Ebden
