= Edward Curr =

Anglo-Australian colonial businessman and politician

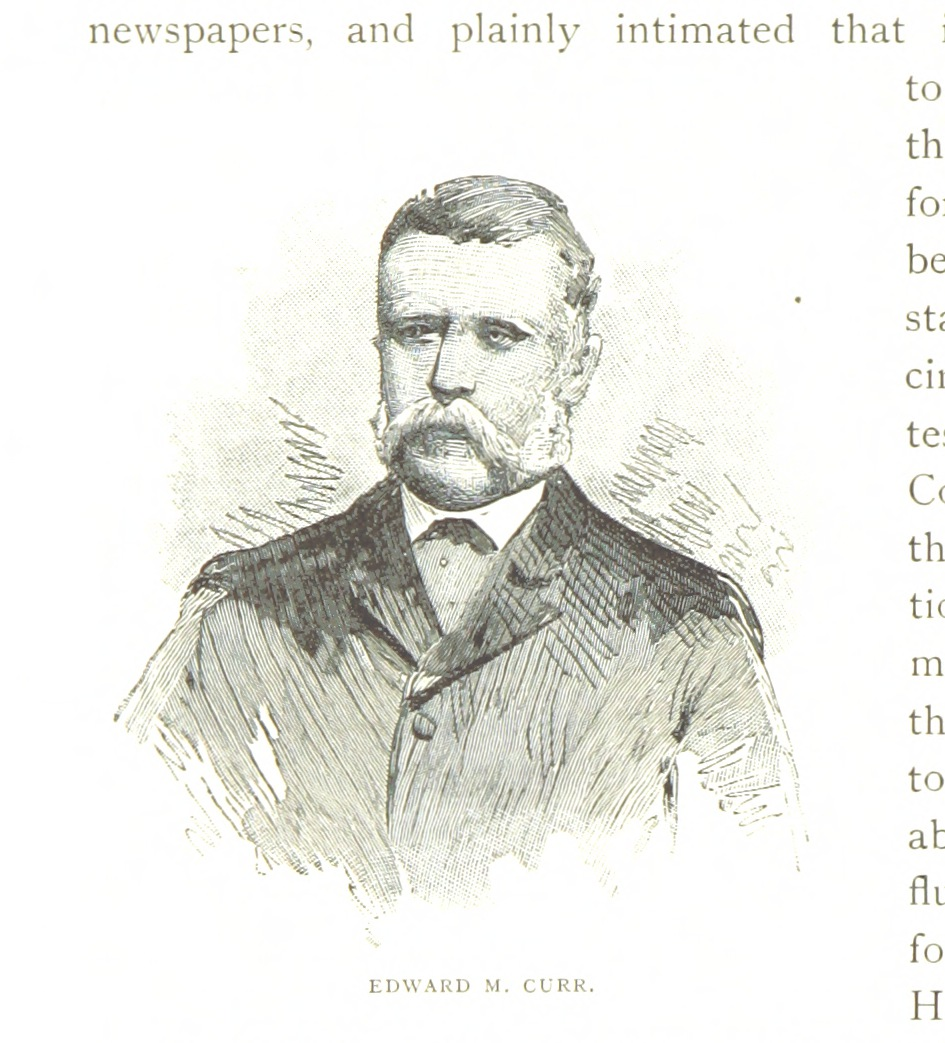
An 1888 illustration of Curr

Edward Curr (1 July 1798 – 16 November 1850) was an Australian settler and politician. Curr was born in Sheffield, England. He travelled to Hobart Town, arriving in February 1820. In 1823 he returned to England. In 1824 he was appointed manager of the newly formed Van Diemen's Land Company which had arranged to buy 250,000 acres (101,173 ha) of land in the north-west of the colony.

Curr arrived back in Hobart in May 1826 and headed north to survey his company's land. He established the company's base at Circular Head by September 1826.

The land taken up by the company was occupied by the Peerapper people of Aboriginal Tasmanians. Their country was forcefully appropriated by the company for sheep farming and other agricultural pursuits. Edward Curr implemented an intensely violent policy against the Peerapper, openly stating that successful occupation of the land would only be achieved by the extermination or expulsion of the Indigenous population.

Several large massacres of the Peerapper were conducted by the employees of the Van Diemen's Land Company under Curr's reign, including the Cape Grim massacre. By 1835, the Peerapper had been completely erased from the entire region, either by being killed or being removed to the Wybalenna Aboriginal Establishment on Flinders Island.

Curr was a member of the Legislative Council of Van Diemen's Land 1825 to 1826 (later Tasmania). As a Jesuit, Curr refused to take the required oath – that he did not believe in fundamental tenets of the Catholic faith and that he deny any allegiance to the descendants of Catholic monarch James II. Governor Arthur waived the requirement and wrote to Secretary for Colonies, Earl Bathurst, for advice on 21 April 1826. In the reply of 11 December, the advice confirmed that Curr was not prevented from taking his position.

Curr visited Melbourne in 1839 and returned to settle in 1842. He was elected as a member of the New South Wales Legislative Council for the District of Port Phillip (later to become the colony of Victoria) for two periods (from 1 September 1845 to 31 May 1846 and from 1 September 1848 to 31 May 1849). From 1844 until his death in 1850, he was extremely active in the movement for separation of Victoria from New South Wales. He became known as the "Father of Separation".

Curr had a wife (Elizabeth) and eleven surviving children, the eldest being Edward Micklethwaite Curr. The town of Sheffield, Tasmania was named by Curr after his home town in England.

Tasmanian Legislative Council
New parliament	Appointed Member; 1825–1826; Served alongside: John Pedder, Edward Abbott, Adolarius Humphrey, William H. Hamilton	Succeeded by Thomas Anstey; Thomas Archer
New South Wales Legislative Council
Preceded by Benjamin Boyd	Member for Port Phillip; 1845–1846; Served alongside: Thomas Boyd / Edward Brewster, John Lang, Maurice O'Connell, Charles Nicholson	Succeeded by John Foster
Preceded by Charles Ebden; John Foster; John Airey; Maurice O'Connell; Charles Nicholson	Member for Port Phillip; 1848–1849; Served alongside: Lauchlan Mackinnon / Charles Ebden; James Williamson, James Palmer, John Dickson	Succeeded by Henry Moor
