= D'Arcy Wentworth Jr. =

Australian politician

- Born: Dorset Crowley; June 23, 1793; Norfolk Island
- Died: July 21, 1861 (aged 68); Launceston
- Occupation(s): Army captain, police magistrate, politician
- Years active: 1811-1845
- Parent(s): D'Arcy Wentworth, Catherine Crowley
- Relatives: William Wentworth
- Family: Wentworth/Hill/Griffiths/Scott/Cooper

D'Arcy Wentworth, born Dorset Crowley (23 June 1793 – 21 July 1861), was a New South Wales army captain, police magistrate and politician.

== Early life ==
He was born Dorset Crowley on Norfolk Island to D'Arcy Wentworth, a surgeon who was distantly related to the former Prime Minister of Great Britain, Charles Watson-Wentworth, 2nd Marquess of Rockingham, and Catherine Crowley, a convict from Staffordshire. They had met on board the Neptune, with D'Arcy being the ship's surgeon and Catherine being transported, which was part of the notorious Second Fleet.

The family left Norfolk Island and sailed for Sydney on board HMS Reliance in February 1796. After his mother's death in January 1800, his father changed the then six-year-old's Dorset Crowley's name to D'Arcy Wentworth, and his younger brother Matthew's name to John Wentworth (1795-1820). He and his brothers William Charles Wentworth and John were sent to England for schooling in 1802, which began in October 1803.

Wentworth enlisted in the army in England in 1811, as an ensign in the 63rd Regiment. His regiment was sent to Ceylon in 1814. He later returned to New South Wales, rising to the rank of captain in 1825.

On 27 April 1826, he married Scottish born Elizabeth Macpherson, third daughter of Major Charles Macpherson (1751-1820) of Gordonhall in Badenoch, barrack-master general of Scotland and Margaret MacPherson of Inverhall near Killiehuntly, at St Cuthbert's Church in Edinburgh; they had no children.

== Career ==
Wentworth was sworn in as a Justice of the Peace for Van Diemen's Land on 9 September 1830. Between 7 October and 24 November 1830, he was one of three commanders of a force of 2200 men, 550 soldiers and 1650 convicts and volunteer colonists, separated into three divisions. Wentworth led detachments of troops from Bothwell and Hamilton, as well as civilian volunteers, towards the Great Lake and the banks of the Ouse, Shannon and Clyde rivers. The operation was known as the Black Line., its purpose was to "...capture those hostile Tribes of Natives which are daily committing renewed atrocities upon the Settlers..." This occurred as part of what has become known as the Black War in Tasmania.

While in Van Diemen's Land, Wentworth served as police magistrate in Bothwell, where he built a significant Georgian sandstone house. It was started in 1830 and was originally called Inverhall but is now known as Wentworth House. He sold the house in 1833 to Charles Schaw, assistant police magistrate for Bothwell.

From 1843 to 1845 he was a member of the New South Wales Legislative Council for the Northumberland boroughs, comprising East and West Maitland and Newcastle.

== Death ==
He died at Launceston on 21 July 1861 and was buried with his parents at St John's Cemetery, Parramatta, on 6 August 1861. His funeral was attended by some of the colony's most celebrated and distinguished citizens.

== See also ==
Political families of Australia: Wentworth/Hill/Griffiths/Scott/Cooper family
