= Results of the 1851 New South Wales colonial election =

Colonial election for New South Wales, Australia in 1851

The 1851 New South Wales colonial election, was held between 12 and 25 September. It involved a re-distribution of electorates as a result of the separation of Victoria, which had 6 seats in the previous council, and the expansion of the council from 24 elected members to 36 elected members representing 31 electorates. The major changes were the addition of 8 pastoral districts and the separate representation for the northern regions of what would later become Queensland. These had previously been a part of the single district of Gloucester, Macquarie, and Stanley and from 1851 were covered by the separate districts of Stanley, Stanley Boroughs and the pastoral districts of Moreton, Wide Bay, Burnett, and Maranoa. The other 8 additional seats were distributed among the nineteen counties of New South Wales.

In 14 out of 31 districts the candidate was elected unopposed, including all eight pastoral districts, which were seen as representing the interests of squatters.

In 1856 the unicameral Legislative Council was abolished and replaced with an elected Legislative Assembly and an appointed Legislative Council.

There would not be another general election for the Legislative Council until 1978.

== Results by district ==
=== Argyle ===
1851 New South Wales colonial election, 18 September: County of Argyle
Candidate	Votes	%
Charles Nicholson	unopposed	

=== Bathurst ===
1851 New South Wales colonial election, 19 September: County of Bathurst
Candidate	Votes	%
James Bligh	75	58.59
Francis Lord	53	41.41
Total votes	128	100.00

=== Eastern Camden ===
1851 New South Wales colonial election, 20 September: Eastern Camden
Candidate	Votes	%
Henry Osborne	308	62.60
James Wilshire	184	37.40
Total votes	492	100

=== Western Camden ===
1851 New South Wales colonial election, 22 September: Western Camden
Candidate	Votes	%
James Macarthur	189	70.52
Dr William Sherwin	79	29.48
Total votes	268	100
Turnout	{{{votes}}}	66.83%

=== Clarence and Darling Downs ===
1851 New South Wales colonial election, 22 September: Pastoral Districts of Clarence and Darling Downs
Candidate	Votes	%
George Leslie	unopposed	

=== Cook and Westmoreland ===
1851 New South Wales colonial election, 23 September: Counties of Cook and Westmoreland
Candidate	Votes	%
James Martin	94	57.32
Alexander Longmore	70	42.68
Total votes	164	100

=== Cumberland ===
Two members to be elected

1851 New South Wales colonial election, 22 September: County of Cumberland
Candidate	Votes	%
John Darvall	306	27.39
Robert Fitzgerald	297	26.59
Charles Cowper	295	26.41
James Byrnes	219	19.61
Total votes	1,117	100.00

=== Cumberland Boroughs ===
1851 New South Wales colonial election, 20 September: Cumberland Boroughs
Candidate	Votes	%
John Holden	123	55.9
William Bowman	97	44.1
Total votes	220	100

=== Durham ===
Two members to be elected

1851 New South Wales colonial election, 24 September: County of Durham
Candidate	Votes	%
Stuart Donaldson	239	34.94
Charles Cowper	231	33.77
Adolphus Young	169	24.71
Edward Hunt	45	6.58
Total votes	684	100

=== Gloucester and Macquarie ===
1851 New South Wales colonial election, 22 September: Counties of Gloucester and Macquarie
Candidate	Votes	%
Phillip King	129	61.72
Joseph Simmons	80	38.28
Total votes	209	100.00

=== King and Georgiana ===
1851 New South Wales colonial election, 20 September: Counties of King and Georgiana
Candidate	Votes	%
James Chisholm	unopposed	

=== Lachlan and Lower Darling ===
1851 New South Wales colonial election, 26 September: Pastoral Districts of Lachlan and Lower Darling
Candidate	Votes	%
William Macarthur	unopposed	

=== Liverpool Plains and Gwydir ===
1851 New South Wales colonial election, 22 September: Pastoral Districts of Liverpool Plains and Gwydir
Candidate	Votes	%
Augustus Morris	unopposed	

=== Maneroo ===
1851 New South Wales colonial election, 25 September: Pastoral District of Maneroo
Candidate	Votes	%
Arthur Jeffreys	unopposed	

=== Moreton, Wide Bay, Burnett, and Maranoa ===
1851 New South Wales colonial election, 25 September: Pastoral Districts of Moreton, Wide Bay, Burnett, and Maranoa
Candidate	Votes	%
Francis Edward Bigge	unopposed	

=== Murray and St Vincent ===
1851 New South Wales colonial election, 23 September: Counties of Murray and St Vincent
Candidate	Votes	%
Alick Osborne	103	56.91
Charles Campbell	78	43.09
Total votes	181	100.00

=== Murrumbidgee ===
1851 New South Wales colonial election, 24 September: Pastoral District of Murrumbidgee
Candidate	Votes	%
George Macleay	unopposed	

=== New England and Macleay ===
1851 New South Wales colonial election, 20 September: Pastoral Districts of New England and Macleay
Candidate	Votes	%
Matthew Henry Marsh	unopposed	

=== North Eastern Boroughs ===
1851 New South Wales colonial election, 20 September: North Eastern Boroughs
Candidate	Votes	%
Edward Flood	47	55.95
Charles Kemp	37	44.05
Total votes	84	100.00

=== Northumberland and Hunter ===
Two members to be elected

1851 New South Wales colonial election, 23 September: Counties of Northumberland and Hunter
Candidate	Votes	%
Henry Douglass	258	37.23
George Bowman	235	33.91
Daniel Egan	200	28.86
Total votes	693	100.00

=== Northumberland Boroughs ===
1851 New South Wales colonial election, 17 September: Northumberland Boroughs
Candidate	Votes	%
Bob Nichols	unopposed	

=== Parramatta ===
1851 New South Wales colonial election, 20 September: Town of Parramatta
Candidate	Votes	%
George Oakes	120	72.31
Alfred Kennerley	10	7.69
Total votes	130	100.00

=== Phillip, Brisbane and Bligh ===
1851 New South Wales colonial election, 23 September: Counties of Phillip, Brisbane and Bligh
Candidate	Votes	%
William Dumaresq	41	52.56
Robert Campbell	37	47.44
Total votes	78	100

=== Roxburgh and Wellington ===
1851 New South Wales colonial election, 24 September: Counties of Roxburgh and Wellington
Candidate	Votes	%
William Suttor Sr.	unopposed	

=== Southern Boroughs ===
1851 New South Wales colonial election, 22 September: Southern Boroughs
Candidate	Votes	%
Terence Murray	unopposed	

=== Stanley Boroughs ===
1851 New South Wales colonial election, 12 September: Stanley Boroughs
Candidate	Votes	%
Richard Jones	114	52.78
Henry Hughes	102	47.22
Total votes	216	100.00

=== Stanley ===
1851 New South Wales colonial election, 13 September: County of Stanley
Candidate	Votes	%
John Richardson	57	65.52
William Wilson	30	34.48
Total votes	87	100.00

=== City of Sydney ===
Three members to be elected

1851 New South Wales colonial election, 16 September: City of Sydney
Candidate	Votes	%
John Lang	1,197	24.13
William Wentworth	1,004	20.24
John Lamb	998	20.12
Alexander Longmore	888	17.90
Charles Cowper	873	17.60
Total votes	4,960	100.00

=== Sydney Hamlets ===
1851 New South Wales colonial election, 20 September: Sydney Hamlets
Candidate	Votes	%
Thomas Smart	255	52.04
William Thurlow	144	29.39
Joshua Josephson	91	18.57
Total votes	490	100

=== Wellington and Bligh ===
1851 New South Wales colonial election, 25 September: Pastoral Districts of Wellington and Bligh
Candidate	Votes	%
James Bettington	unopposed	

=== Western Boroughs ===
1851 New South Wales colonial election, 22 September: Western Boroughs
Candidate	Votes	%
Arthur Holroyd	unopposed	
