= Members of the New South Wales Legislative Council, 1851–1856 =

This is a list of members of the New South Wales Legislative Council from 1851 to 1856. The 1851 Electoral Act increased the number of members in the Council to 54, 18 to be appointed and 36 elected. The initial appointments were made in October 1851. The Speaker was Charles Nicholson.

Name	Appointed or District	Years in office
George Allen	Appointed	1845–1856
Thomas Barker (Note: Thomas Icely resigned in March 1853 and Thomas Barker was appointed to replace him.)	Appointed	1853–1856
George Barney	Appointed (Chief Commissioner of Crown Lands)	1843; 1851–1856
Alexander Berry	Appointed	1843–1856
James Bettington (Note: James Bettington resigned in March 1853 and Charles Finch was elected unopposed to replace him.)	Pastoral Districts of Wellington and Bligh	1851–1853
Francis Bigge (Note: Francis Bigge resigned in December 1852 and Richard Smith was elected unopposed to replace him.)	Pastoral Districts of Moreton, Wide Bay, Burnett, and Maranoa	1851–1852
James Bligh	County of Bathurst	1851–1856
George Bowman	Counties of Northumberland and Hunter	1851–1856
William Bowman (Note: John Holden resigned in March 1853 and William Bowman was elected unopposed to replace him.)	Cumberland Boroughs	1843–1851; 1853–1856
William Bradley (Note: Alexander Longmore died on 27 October 1851 and William Bradley was appointed to replace him.)	Appointed	1843–1846; 1851–1856
Edward Broadhurst	Appointed	1851–1856
Robert Campbell (Note: John Lang resigned in October 1851 and Robert Campbell was elected to replace him.)	City of Sydney	1851–1856
James Chisholm	Counties of King and Georgiana	1851–1856; 1865–1888
William Christie (Note: William Lithgow resigned in May 1852 and William Christie was appointed to replace him.)	Appointed	1852–1856
Daniel Cooper (Note: Alick Osborne resigned in February 1855 and Daniel Cooper was elected to replace him.)	Counties of Murray and St Vincent	1849–1851; 1855–1856
Charles Cowper	County of Durham	1843–1850; 1851–1856; 1860
Edward Cox (Note: Edward Cox resigned from the Legislative Council in May 1855 and James Mitchell was appointed to replace him.)	Appointed	1851–1855
John Darvall	County of Cumberland	1844–1856
Alfred Denison	Appointed	1851–1851
John Dobie (Note: John Dobie resigned in March 1855 and Thomas Icely was appointed to replace him.)	Appointed	1851–1855
Stuart Donaldson (Note: Stuart Donaldson resigned in January 1853 and Alexander Park was elected unopposed to replace him.) (Note: Thomas Smart resigned in February 1855 and Stuart Donaldson was elected to replace him.)	County of Durham; Sydney Hamlets	1848–1853; 1855–1856
Henry Douglass	Counties of Northumberland and Hunter	1851–1856; 1856–1861
William Dumaresq	Counties of Phillip, Brisbane and Bligh	1843–1848; 1851–1856
Daniel Egan	Pastoral District of Maneroo	1854–1856
Charles Finch	Pastoral Districts of Wellington and Bligh	1853–1856
Robert Fitzgerald	County of Cumberland	1849–1856; 1856–1865
Edward Flood	North Eastern Boroughs	1851–1856; 1879–1888
John Gibbes (Note: John Gibbes resigned from the Legislative Council, but not as Collector of Customs, in May 1855 and Edward Ward was appointed to replace him.)	Appointed (Collector of Customs)	1843–1855
Arthur Hodgson (Note: John Richardson resigned in March 1854. Votes were tied in the subsequent by-election the returning officer gave a casting vote for Arthur Hodgson. Hodgson's election however was declared void, and John Lang won the subsequent election by a single vote.)	County of Stanley	1854
John Holden	Cumberland Boroughs; Appointed	1851–1853; 1853–1856
Arthur Holroyd	Western Boroughs	1851–1856
Thomas Hood (Note: George Leslie resigned in February 1855 and Thomas Hood was elected to replace him.)	Pastoral Districts of Clarence and Darling Downs	1855–1856; 1856–1861
Henry Hughes	Appointed	1851–1853
Thomas Icely	Appointed	1843–1853; 1855–1856; 1864–1874
Arthur Jeffreys (Note: Arthur Jeffreys resigned in February 1854 and Daniel Egan was elected on a show of hands to replace him.)	Pastoral District of Maneroo	1851–1854
Richard Jones (Note: Richard Jones died on 6 November 1852, and Henry Russell was elected on a show of hands to replace him.)	Stanley Boroughs	1829–1843; 1850–1852
Phillip King	Counties of Gloucester and Macquarie	1839; 1850–1851; 1851–1856
John Lamb (Note: John Lamb resigned in February 1853 and William Thurlow was elected to replace him.)	City of Sydney	1844–1851; 1851–1853
John Lang	City of Sydney County of Stanley	1843–1847; 1850–1851; 1854–1856
George Leslie	Pastoral Districts of Clarence and Darling Downs	1851–1855
William Lithgow	Appointed (Auditor-General)	1829–1852
Alexander Longmore	Appointed	1851
James Macarthur	County of Camden, Western Division	1839–1843; 1848–1856; 1866–1867
William Macarthur (Note: William Macarthur resigned in January 1855 in order to represent the colony at the Paris International Exhibition of 1855 and William Macleay was elected to replace him.)	Pastoral Districts of Lachlan and Lower Darling	1849–1855; 1864–1882
George Macleay	Pastoral District of Murrumbidgee	1851–1856
William Macleay	Pastoral Districts of Lachlan and Lower Darling	1855–1856
William Manning	Appointed (Solicitor General)	1851–1856
Matthew Marsh (Note: Matthew Marsh resigned in March 1855 and Robert Massie was elected to replace him. Massie's election however was declared void, and Thomas Rusden won the subsequent election.)	Pastoral Districts of New England and Macleay	1851–1855
James Martin	Counties of Cook and Westmoreland	1848–1856
Robert Massie	Pastoral Districts of New England and Macleay	1855
William Mayne (Note: William Spain resigned in May 1852 and William Mayne was appointed to replace him.)	Appointed (Inspector-General of Police)	1852–1856
Francis Merewether	Appointed (Postmaster-General)	1851–1856
James Mitchell	Appointed	1855–1856
Augustus Morris	Pastoral Districts of Liverpool Plains and Gwydir	1851–1856
Terence Murray	Southern Boroughs	1843–1856
Bob Nichols	Northumberland Boroughs	1848–1856
Charles Nicholson	County of Argyle	1843–1856
George Oakes	Town of Parramatta	1848–1856; 1879–1881
Alick Osborne	Counties of Murray and St Vincent	1851–1855
Henry Osborne	County of Camden, Eastern Division	1851–1856
Alexander Park	County of Durham	1853–1856
Henry Parker	Appointed	1846–1856
Henry Parkes	City of Sydney	1854–1856
John Plunkett	Appointed (Attorney General)	1836–1841; 1843–1856; 1857–1858; 1861–1869
John Richardson (Note: Henry Russell resigned in August 1855 and John Richardson was elected unopposed to replace him.)	County of Stanley; Stanley Boroughs	1851–1854; 1855–1856
Campbell Riddell	Appointed (Colonial Treasurer)	1843–1858
Thomas Rusden	Pastoral Districts of New England and Macleay	1855–1856
Henry Russell	Stanley Boroughs	1853–1855
Saul Samuel (Note: William Suttor Sr. resigned in September 1854 and Saul Samuel was elected unopposed to replace him.)	Counties of Roxburgh and Wellington	1854–1856; 1872–1880
Thomas Smart	Sydney Hamlets	1851–1855; 1870–1881
Richard Smith	Pastoral Districts of Moreton, Wide Bay, Burnett, and Maranoa	1853–1856
William Spain	Appointed (Inspector-General of Police)	1851–1852; 1856–1858
John Stirling (Note: Edward Thomson resigned in January 1854 from the Legislative Council, but not as Colonial Secretary, while he went to England to watch over the progress of the Constitution Bill in the British parliament. John Stirling was appointed to replace him.)	Appointed	1854–1856
William Suttor Sr.	Counties of Roxburgh and Wellington	1843–1854
Edward Thomson	Appointed (Colonial Secretary)	1837–1854; 1856–1879
William Thurlow (Note: William Thurlow resigned in January 1855 and James Wilshire was elected unopposed to replace him.)	City of Sydney	1853–1855
Edward Ward	Appointed	1855–1856; 1861–1865
William Wentworth (Note: William Wentworth resigned in April 1854 from the Legislative Council while he went to England to watch over the progress of the Constitution Bill in the British parliament. Henry Parkes was elected to replace him.)	City of Sydney	1843–1854; 1861–1862
James Wilshire	City of Sydney	1855–1856
