= Results of the 1848 New South Wales colonial election =

Colonial election for New South Wales, Australia in 1848

The 1848 New South Wales colonial election was held between 29 July and 2 August. No candidates were nominated for Port Phillip as a result of the campaign for independence from New South Wales, and a fresh writ was issued for an election on 3 October.

== Results by district ==
=== County of Argyle ===
1848 New South Wales colonial election, 31 July: County of Argyle
Candidate	Votes	%
Charles Nicholson (elected)	unopposed	

=== County of Bathurst ===
1848 New South Wales colonial election, 29 July: County of Bathurst
Candidate	Votes	%
John Darvall (elected)	87	50
Francis Lord	87	50
Total votes	174	100

The returning officer gave his casting vote in favour of John Darvall.

=== County of Camden ===
1848 New South Wales colonial election, 31 July: County of Camden
Candidate	Votes	%
James Macarthur (elected)	unopposed	

=== Counties of Cook and Westmoreland ===
1848 New South Wales colonial election, 29 July: Counties of Cook and Westmoreland
Candidate	Votes	%
James Martin (elected)	103	66
Alfred Cheeke	54	34
Total votes	157	100

The election of James Martin was declared void on the grounds that he was not qualified to stand; however, he was re-elected unopposed. Martin subsequently sued the Speaker of the Legislative Council, Charles Nicholson and the Sergeant at Arms, William Christie, for trespass for having him removed when there had been no decision of the Electoral Court in accordance with the Electoral Act 1843. The Full Court of the Supreme Court held that under the Electoral Act 1843 it was only the Electoral Court that could determine there was a vacancy and not the Governor.

=== County of Cumberland ===
Two members to be elected

1848 New South Wales colonial election, 2 August: County of Cumberland
Candidate	Votes	%
Charles Cowper (elected 1)	637	38
Nelson Lawson (elected 2)	556	33
Henry Gilbert Smith	490	29
Total votes	1,683	100

=== Cumberland Boroughs ===
1848 New South Wales colonial election, 1 August: Cumberland Boroughs
Candidate	Votes	%
William Bowman (elected)	165	89
Robert Fitzgerald	20	11
Total votes	185	100

=== County of Durham ===
1848 New South Wales colonial election, 26 July: County of Durham
Candidate	Votes	%
Stuart Donaldson (elected)	Show of Hands	
Andrew Lang		

On 26 July 1848, the day prescribed for nominations, Stuart Donaldson and Andrew Lang were nominated. A show of hands was in favour of Donaldson and Lang demanded a poll. The returning officer had neglected to make any preparations for a poll and so declared Donaldson elected. Donaldson attempted to resign on 16 August. The election was declared void by the court of disputed returns and a new writ issued.

=== Counties of Gloucester, Macquarie, and Stanley ===
1848 New South Wales colonial election, 2 August: Counties of Gloucester, Macquarie, and Stanley
Candidate	Votes	%
Kenneth Snodgrass (elected)	98	68
Archibald Boyd	47	32
Total votes	145	100
Turnout	{{{votes}}}	48%

The writ was not returned in time and the Governor issued a proclamation declaring the election was valid despite the delay.

=== Counties of Hunter, Brisbane and Bligh ===
1848 New South Wales colonial election, 29 July: Counties of Hunter, Brisbane and Bligh
Candidate	Votes	%
Donald McIntyre (elected)	19	70
William Dumaresq	6	22
John Lang	2	7
Total votes	27	100

=== City of Melbourne ===
1848 New South Wales colonial election, 26 July: City of Melbourne
Candidate	Votes	%
Earl Grey (elected)	295	74
John Foster	102	26
Total votes	397	100

Earl Grey, the Colonial Secretary in London, had never set foot in the colony and there was no suggestion he met the property requirement for election. He was nominated and elected as part of the campaign for independence, protesting against government by New South Wales.

=== Counties of Murray, King and Georgiana ===
1848 New South Wales colonial election, 31 July: Counties of Murray, King and Georgiana
Candidate	Votes	%
Terence Murray (elected)	unopposed	

=== County of Northumberland ===
1848 New South Wales colonial election, 31 July: County of Northumberland
Candidate	Votes	%
Henry Dangar (elected)	127	64
Charles Salmon Vallack	73	36
Total votes	200	100

=== Northumberland Boroughs ===
1848 New South Wales colonial election, 29 July: Northumberland Boroughs
Candidate	Votes	%
Bob Nichols (elected)	185	70
William Moir	80	30
Total votes	265	100

=== Town of Parramatta ===
1848 New South Wales colonial election, 28 July: Town of Parramatta
Candidate	Votes	%
George Oakes (elected)	101	53
William Macarthur	89	47
Total votes	190	100

=== Port Phillip ===
Five members to be elected

1848 New South Wales colonial election, 3 October: Port Phillip
Candidate	Votes	%
Lauchlan Mackinnon (elected 1)	239	17
James Williamson (elected 2)	234	16
John Dickson (elected 3)	232	16
James Palmer (elected 4)	226	16
Edward Curr (elected 5)	189	13
The Duke of Wellington, Lord Palmerston, Lord Brougham, Lord John Russell, Sir Robert Peel	58	4
William Macarthur	25	1
Total votes	1,435	100

The original polling day was 27 July; however, no candidates were nominated for Port Phillip as a result of the campaign for independence from New South Wales. A further writ was issued on 25 August.

=== Counties of Roxburgh, Phillip and Wellington ===
1848 New South Wales colonial election, 31 July: Counties of Roxburgh, Phillip and Wellington
Candidate	Votes	%
William Suttor Sr. (elected)	unopposed	

=== Counties of St Vincent and Auckland ===
1848 New South Wales colonial election, 31 July: Counties of St Vincent and Auckland
Candidate	Votes	%
George Hill (elected)	14	56
Robert Lowe	11	44
Total votes	25	100

The writ was not returned in time and the Governor issued a proclamation declaring the election was valid despite the delay.

=== City of Sydney ===
Two members to be elected

1848 New South Wales colonial election, 28 July: City of Sydney
Candidate	Votes	%
William Wentworth (elected 1)	1,168	29
Robert Lowe (elected 2)	1,012	25
John Lamb	950	24
William Bland	874	22
Total votes	4,004	100

== See also ==
- Members of the New South Wales Legislative Council, 1843–1851
