= Results of the 1843 New South Wales colonial election =

Colonial election for New South Wales, Australia in 1843

The 1843 New South Wales colonial election, the first in the colony, was held between 15 June and 3 July 1843, to elect 24 members from eighteen electoral districts. Each district returned one member, except for Port Phillip which returned five members and County of Cumberland and Town of Sydney which returned two each.

== Results by district ==
=== County of Argyle ===
1843 New South Wales colonial election, 19 June: County of Argyle
Candidate	Votes	%
William Bradley	unopposed	

=== County of Bathurst ===
1843 New South Wales colonial election, 19 June: County of Bathurst
Candidate	Votes	%
Francis Lord	66	60.00
W Lane	44	40.00
Total votes	110	100.00

=== County of Camden ===
1843 New South Wales colonial election, 24 June: County of Camden
Candidate	Votes	%
Roger Therry	146	51.77
Charles Cowper	136	48.23
Total votes	282	100.00

=== Counties of Cook and Westmoreland ===
1843 New South Wales colonial election, 16 June: Counties of Cook and Westmoreland
Candidate	Votes	%
John Panton	112	65.12
George Bowman	60	34.88
Total votes	172	100.00

=== County of Cumberland ===
Two members to be elected

1843 New South Wales colonial election, 3 July: County of Cumberland
Candidate	Votes	%
Charles Cowper	504	29.18
William Lawson	383	22.18
James Macarthur	372	21.54
Bob Nichols	334	19.34
Ryan Brenan	134	7.76
Total votes	1,727	100.00

=== Cumberland Boroughs ===
1843 New South Wales colonial election, 19 June: Cumberland Boroughs
Candidate	Votes	%
William Bowman	127	50.20
Robert Fitzgerald	126	49.80
Total votes	253	100.00

=== County of Durham ===
1843 New South Wales colonial election, 24 June: County of Durham
Candidate	Votes	%
Richard Windeyer	122	49.19
William Ogilvie	71	28.63
Andrew Lang	55	22.18
Total votes	248	100.00

=== Counties of Gloucester, Macquarie, and Stanley ===
1843 New South Wales colonial election, 23 June: Counties of Gloucester, Macquarie, and Stanley
Candidate	Votes	%
Alexander Macleay	142	79.78
Charles Windeyer	36	20.22
Total votes	178	100.00

=== Counties of Hunter, Brisbane and Bligh ===
1843 New South Wales colonial election, 24 June: Counties of Hunter, Brisbane and Bligh
Candidate	Votes	%
William Dumaresq	58	52.25
Henry Dangar	34	30.63
Donald McIntyre	19	17.12
Total votes	111	100.00

=== Town of Melbourne ===
1843 New South Wales colonial election, 17 June: Town of Melbourne
Candidate	Votes	%
Henry Condell	295	53.06
Edward Curr	261	46.94
Total votes	556	100.00

=== Counties of Murray, King and Georgiana ===
1843 New South Wales colonial election, 22 June: Counties of Murray, King and Georgiana
Candidate	Votes	%
Terence Murray	unopposed	

=== County of Northumberland ===
1843 New South Wales colonial election, 19 June: County of Northumberland
Candidate	Votes	%
William Foster	unopposed	

=== Northumberland Boroughs ===
1843 New South Wales colonial election, 20 June: Northumberland Boroughs
Candidate	Votes	%
D'Arcy Wentworth	121	52.84
Alexander Walker Scott	108	47.16
Total votes	229	100.00

=== Town of Parramatta ===
1843 New South Wales colonial election, 16 June: Town of Parramatta
Candidate	Votes	%
Hannibal Macarthur	unopposed	

=== Port Phillip ===
Five members to be elected

1843 New South Wales colonial election, 20 June: Port Phillip
Candidate	Votes	%
Charles Ebden	228	19.69
Thomas Walker	217	18.74
Charles Nicholson	206	17.79
Alexander Thomson	184	15.89
John Dunmore Lang	166	14.34
Sir Thomas Mitchell	157	13.56
Total votes	1,158	100.00

=== Counties of Roxburgh, Phillip and Wellington ===
1843 New South Wales colonial election, 26 June: Counties of Roxburgh, Phillip and Wellington
Candidate	Votes	%
William Suttor Sr.	unopposed	

=== Counties of St Vincent and Auckland ===
1843 New South Wales colonial election, 21 June: Counties of St Vincent and Auckland
Candidate	Votes	%
John Coghill	unopposed	

=== Town of Sydney ===
Two members to be elected

1843 New South Wales colonial election, 15 June: Town of Sydney
Candidate	Votes	%
William Wentworth	1,275	32.10
William Bland	1,261	31.75
Maurice O'Connell Jr.	733	18.45
Robert Cooper	365	9.19
William Hustler	338	8.51
Total votes	3,972	100.00

== See also ==
- Members of the New South Wales Legislative Council, 1843–1851
