= Bunyip aristocracy =

1853 satirical term in New South Wales, Australia

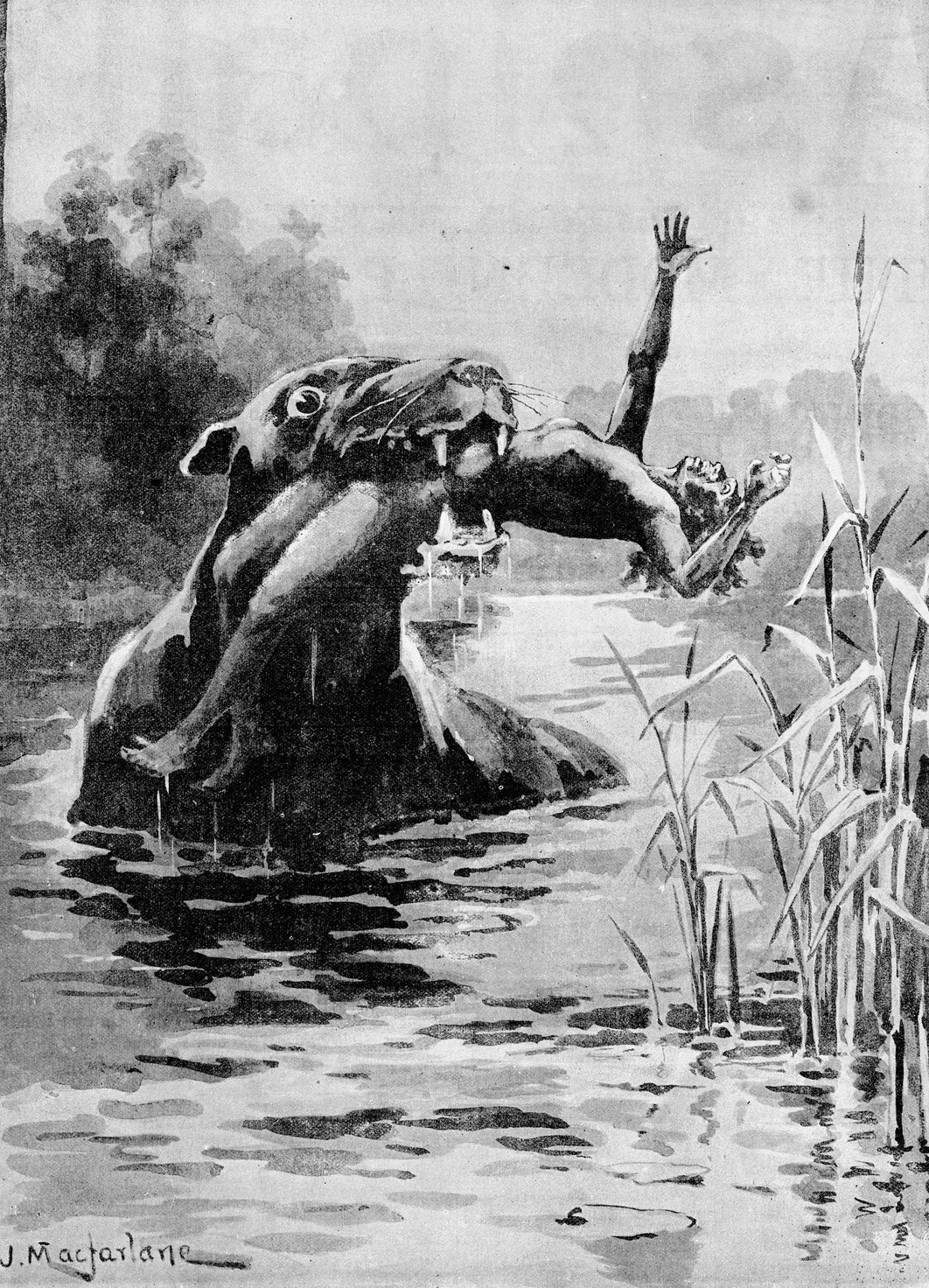
A bunyip depicted in 1890

Bunyip aristocracy is an Australian term satirising attempts by William Wentworth to establish a system of titles in the colony of New South Wales. It was coined in 1853 by Daniel Deniehy in what came to be known as the Bunyip Aristocracy speech which he delivered in the Victoria Theatre and on the soapbox at Circular Quay.

== Context ==
=== Proposals ===
A committee, consisting of Charles Cowper, T. A. Murray, George Macleay, E. Deas Thomson, John Plunkett, Henry Douglass, William Thurlow, James Macarthur, James Martin and William Wentworth, appointed on the motion of Wentworth, held its first meeting in Sydney on 27 May 1853. Fifteen meetings were called. Half the members did not attend the meetings. The bill was reported on 28 July 1853.

=== Opposition ===
It was almost universally condemned by the people and a large public meeting was called to oppose it. In the advertisement convening the meeting were the following paragraphs:

Colonists ! Will you submit to be robbed of your rights? A committee of the Legislative Council has framed a new Constitution for the colony, by which it is proposed:

1. To create a colonial nobility with hereditary privileges.
2. To construct an Upper House of Legislature in which the people will have no voice.
3. To add eighteen new seats to the Lower House, only one of which is to be allotted to Sydney while the other seventeen are to be allotted among the country and squatting districts.
4. To squander the public revenue by pensioning off the officers of the Government on their full salaries, thus implanting in our institutions a principle of jobbery and corruption.
5. To fix irrevocably on the people this oligarchy in the name of free institutions so that no future Legislature can reform it even by absolute majority.

The Legislative Council has the hardihood to propose passing this unconstitutional and anti-British measure with only a few days notice, and before it can possibly be considered by the colonists at large.

The meeting was addressed by Henry Parkes and other liberals, and the result of the agitation was that the most objectionable clause, to create an hereditary colonial peerage, was struck out.

== Dan Deniehy's bunyip aristocracy speech ==
In response to Wentworth's proposal to create a hereditary peerage in New South Wales, Deniehy's satirical comments included: "Here, we all know the common water mole was transferred into the duck-billed platypus, and in some distant emulation of this degeneration, I suppose we are to be favoured with a bunyip aristocracy." (Note: The bunyip is an Ancestral Being of Aboriginal Dreaming.) Deniehy's ridicule caused the idea to be dropped.

Among those singled out in his speech by Deniehy was James MacArthur (1798–1867), the son of John MacArthur, who had been nominated to the New South Wales Legislative Council in 1839 and was later (1859) elected to the New South Wales Legislative Assembly (the lower house was only created in 1856):

Next came the native aristocrat James MacArthur, he would he supposed, aspire to the coronet of an earl, he would call him the Earl of Camden, and he suggests for his coat of arms a field vert, the heraldic term for green, and emblazoned on this field should be a rum keg (Note: This is a reference to the Rum Rebellion in which John Macarthur played a major role.) of a New South Wales order of chivalry.

== Aftermath ==
The strong popular support for Deniehy's views caused the abandonment of the proposal to which he was responding. It probably also delayed the introduction of an Australian honours system. The Order of Australia was not introduced until 1975. Until that time, Australians were awarded British honours.

== Legacy ==
"Bunyip aristocracy" is now a pejorative term for those Australians who consider themselves to be aristocrats.
