= Electoral district of Pastoral Districts of Wellington and Bligh (NSW Legislative Council) =

Pastoral Districts of Wellington and Bligh New South Wales—Legislative Council
- State: New South Wales
- Created: 1851
- Abolished: 1856
- Namesake: New England region & Macleay River

The Electoral district of Pastoral Districts of Wellington and Bligh was an electorate of the New South Wales Legislative Council at a time when some of its members were elected and the balance were appointed by the Governor. It was a new electorate created in 1851 by the expansion of the Legislative Council to 54, 18 to be appointed and 36 elected. The district was located in the central west region of the state and covered the pastoral areas to the west of the Counties of Roxburgh and Wellington and Counties of Phillip, Brisbane and Bligh. To the north was the Pastoral Districts of Liverpool Plains and Gwydir and to the south the Pastoral Districts of Lachlan and Lower Darling. If polling had been required, it would have taken place in the towns of Molong, Wellington, Dubbo, Canowindra, Coola and Mudgee.

In 1856 the unicameral Legislative Council was abolished and replaced with an elected Legislative Assembly and an appointed Legislative Council. The district was represented by the Legislative Assembly electorate of Wellington and Bligh.

== Members ==
Member	Term
James Bettington	Sep 1851 – Mar 1853
Charles Finch	Apr 1853 – Feb 1856

== Election results ==
=== 1851 ===
1851 New South Wales colonial election, 25 September: Pastoral Districts of Wellington and Bligh
Candidate	Votes	%
James Bettington	unopposed	

=== 1853 ===
James Bettington resigned in March 1853.

Pastoral Districts of Wellington and Bligh by-election 27 April 1853
Candidate	Votes	%
Charles Finch	unopposed	
