= 1856 Bathurst County colonial by-election =

By-election in New South Wales, Australia

A by-election was to be held for the New South Wales Legislative Assembly electorate of Bathurst County on 19 June 1856 because John Plunkett had been elected to two seats and chose to represent Argyle and resigned from Bathurst County.

== Dates ==
Date	Event
31 March 1856	John Plunkett elected for both Argyle and Bathurst County.
29 May 1856	John Plunkett resigned from Bathurst County.
2 June 1856	Writ of election issued by the Speaker of the Legislative Assembly.
16 June 1856	Nominations
19 June 1856	Polling day
30 June 1856	Return of writ

== Results ==
1856 Bathurst County by-election Thursday 19 June
Candidate	Votes	%
William Suttor (elected)	230	56.8
Thomas Mort	175	43.2
Total formal votes	405	100.0
Informal votes	0	0
Turnout	405	56.9

== See also ==
- Electoral results for the district of Bathurst (County)
- List of New South Wales state by-elections
