= Electoral results for the district of Bathurst (County) =

Election results for Bathurst County, New South Wales, Australia

Bathurst County, an electoral district of the Legislative Assembly in the Australian state of New South Wales was created in 1856 and abolished in 1859.

Election	Member	Party
1856	John Plunkett	None
1856 by	William Suttor	None
1858	William Suttor	None

== Election results ==
=== 1858 ===
1858 New South Wales colonial election: Bathurst (County) 25 January
Candidate	Votes	%
William Suttor (re-elected)	unopposed	

=== 1856 by-election ===
Having been elected to two seats, John Plunkett chose to resign from Bathurst County in May 1856.

1856 Bathurst County by-election Thursday 19 June
Candidate	Votes	%
William Suttor (elected)	230	56.8
Thomas Mort	175	43.2
Total formal votes	405	100.0
Informal votes	0	0
Turnout	405	56.9

John Plunkett had been elected to two seats and chose to represent Argyle and resigned from Bathurst County.

=== 1856 ===
1856 New South Wales colonial election: Bathurst (County)
Candidate	Votes	%
John Plunkett (elected)	210	54.0
James Bligh	179	46.0
Total formal votes	389	100.0
Informal votes	0	0.0
Turnout	389	54.6

Polling was conducted on 31 March 1856. Both Bligh and Plunkett had served in the old Legislative Council, Bligh representing County of Bathurst and Plunkett as an appointed member. After failed attempts to win election for Sydney City and North Eastern Boroughs, Plunkett was elected to represent Argyle on the same day as winning Bathurst (County). After signing the attendance book at the first sitting as a representative of both seats, and even attempting to vote twice in the ballot for Speaker, he chose to represent Argyle and resigned as member for Bathurst (County).
