= List of mayors of Willoughby =

Mayor of Willoughby
- Incumbent; Tanya Taylor since 21 December 2021
- Style: His/Her Worship
- Appointer: Willoughby City Council
- Term length: One year (1865–1999); Four years (1999–date)
- Inaugural holder: Ald. James William Bligh
- Formation: 1 January 1866
- Deputy: Brendan Zhu
- Website: www.willoughby.nsw.gov.au

This is a list of the Mayors of Willoughby City Council and its predecessors, a local government area of New South Wales, Australia. The official title of Mayors while holding office is: His/Her Worship The Mayor of Willoughby. First incorporated on 23 October 1865 as the Municipality of Willoughby, the council first met to elect six Aldermen and two Auditors on 16 December 1865, in the house of James Harris French and the first chairman, James William Bligh, was elected on 1 January 1866. With the enactment of the Municipalities Act, 1867 the title of chairman was changed to "Mayor".

The council area was proclaimed as the City of Willoughby on 17 November 1989. On 1 July 1993 following the enactment of a new Local Government Act, elected representatives of the council were to be known as 'Councillor', replacing the former title of 'Alderman'. Originally, nominated annually by the council, since 1999 the mayor has been popularly elected for a four-year term.

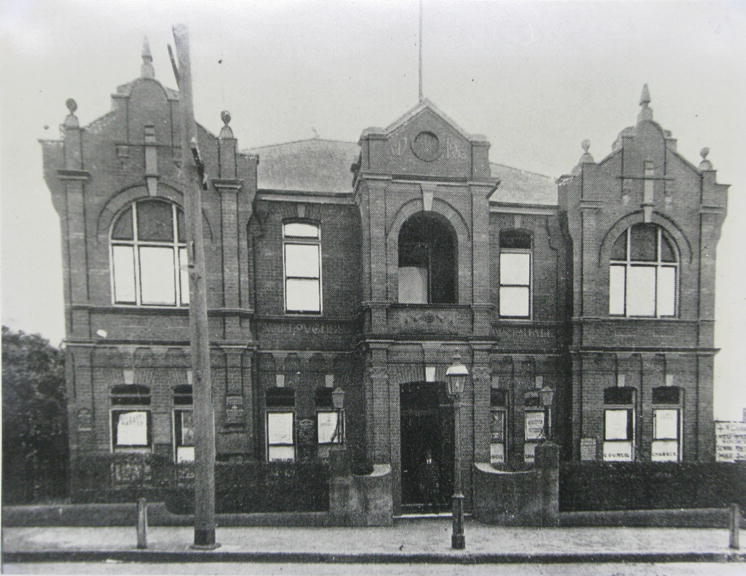
The first Willoughby Town Hall, on Victoria Avenue, Chatswood, 1907. Built in 1903, it was demolished in 1969 to make way for the new town hall and is now the site of The Concourse.

== List of incumbents ==
Years	Chairman	Notes
1 January 1866 – 23 December 1867	James William Bligh	
Years	Mayors	Notes
23 December 1867 – 18 February 1868	James William Bligh	
18 February 1868 – 10 February 1869	David Broadfoot	
10 February 1869 – 8 February 1870	Henry Hocken Bligh	
8 February 1870 – 18 February 1871	Richard H. Harnett	
18 February 1871 – February 1872	Henry Hocken Bligh	
February 1872 – February 1873	James Harris French	
February 1873 – 10 February 1874	Elijah Charlish	
10 February 1874 – 13 February 1875	James Peter Best	
13 February 1875 – February 1876	James Forsyth Snr.	
February 1876 – 10 February 1881	Richard Seldon	
10 February 1881 – 18 February 1882	Elijah Charlish	
18 February 1882 – 9 February 1883	Thomas Todd Forsyth	
9 February 1883 – 19 February 1884	James Peter Best	
19 February 1884 – 11 February 1887	Howard Fleming	
11 February 1887 – 7 March 1888	Thomas Todd Forsyth	
7 March 1888 – February 1890	Alexander Simpson	
February 1890 – 13 February 1891	William Thomas Muston	
13 February 1891 – 11 February 1892	Henry Charles Catt	
11 February 1892 – February 1893	Robert Small	
February 1893 – 16 February 1894	Thomas Todd Forsyth	
16 February 1894 – 28 February 1895	Howard Fleming	
28 February 1895 – March 1896	Robert Small	
March 1896 – February 1898	Robert Henry Gordon	
February 1898 – February 1899	Claude Leplastrier	
February 1899 – 14 February 1901	George Francis Bailey	
14 February 1901 – 13 February 1902	Frederick Smythe Willis	
13 February 1902 – 16 February 1905	Fitt Charles Petrie	
16 February 1905 – 14 February 1906	John Norbert Mason	
14 February 1906 – February 1908	William M. Cleland Jr.	
February 1908 – February 1910	George Francis Bailey	
February 1910 – 6 February 1911	H. H. Robey	
6 February 1911 – February 1912	Robert Todd Forsyth	
February 1912 – February 1914	Clive N. Backhouse	
February 1914 – February 1915	William T. Dickson	
February 1915 – February 1919	Robert Todd Forsyth	
February 1919 – February 1920	Fitt Charles Petrie	
February 1920 – December 1921	Robert Todd Forsyth	
December 1921 – December 1925	H. W. Clarke	
December 1926 – 12 December 1927	Robert Todd Forsyth	
12 December 1927 – 23 December 1930	Lancelot Bavin	
23 December 1930 – December 1932	Joseph Bales	
December 1932 – December 1934	Ernest Edward Alcorn	
December 1934 – December 1935	Herbert Parkinson Piper	
December 1935 – December 1936	Joseph Bales	
December 1936 – December 1937	Arnold Vivian Meldrum	
December 1937 – December 1942	Joseph Bales	
December 1942 – December 1944	Henry Hastings Willis	
December 1944 – 1947	Joseph Bales	
1948–1949	W. M. Jack	
1950–1952	A. R. Baldwin	
1953–1954	Edgar Absalom Deans	
1955–1957	David John Cawthorne	
1958–1959	N. R. McDowell	
1960–1967	Laurie McGinty	
1968 – September 1972	Bob Dougherty	
September 1972 – September 1974	David Warner	
September 1974 – September 1980	Noel Reidy	
September 1980 – September 1982	Jack Wilkinson Donnelly	
September 1982 – September 1991	Noel Reidy	
September 1991 – September 1993	Greg Bartels	
September 1993 – September 1995	John Squire	
September 1995 – September 1997	Eunice Raymond	
September 1997 – 20 January 2014	Pat Reilly	
16 April 2014 – 21 December 2021	Gail Giles-Gidney	
21 December 2021 – present	Tanya Taylor	

== Electoral results ==
=== 2024 ===
2024 New South Wales mayoral elections: Willoughby
Party	Candidate	Votes	%	±%
Community Matters	Tanya Taylor	18,314	48.97	
Community Independents	Anna Greco	8,779	23.47	
Team Roy	Roy McCullagh	4,449	11.90	
Independent Labor	Hao Luo	3,653	9.77	
Independent	Jade Yu-Chun Hsueh	2,207	5.90	
Total formal votes		37,402		
Informal votes		2,168		
Turnout		39,570		
Two-candidate-preferred result
Community Matters	Tanya Taylor	19,605	66.66	
Community Independents	Anna Greco	9,804	33.34	
Community Matters hold		Swing	N/A	

=== 2021 ===
2021 New South Wales mayoral elections: Willoughby
Party	Candidate	Votes	%	±%
Community Matters	Tanya Taylor	14,903	39.3	+39.3
Independent Liberal	Angelo Rozos	13,303	35.1	+4.6
Independent Liberal	Craig Campbell	9,736	25.7	+25.7
Total formal votes		37,942	96.2	+1.2
Informal votes		1,511	3.8	−1.2
Turnout		39,453	85.0	+4.0
Two-candidate-preferred result
Community Matters	Tanya Taylor	17,207	54.0	+54.0
Independent Liberal	Angelo Rozos	14,676	46.0	+15.5
Community Matters gain from Independent Liberal		Swing	N/A	

=== 2017 ===
2017 New South Wales mayoral elections: Willoughby
Party	Candidate	Votes	%	±%
Independent Liberal	Gail Giles-Gidney	24,713	69.5	+18.7
Independent Liberal	Angelo Rozos	10,869	30.5	+30.5
Total formal votes		35,582	95.0	−1.3
Informal votes			5.0	+1.3
Turnout			81.0	+12.3
Independent Liberal hold		Swing	+18.7	

- Changes compared with 2014 Willoughby mayoral by-election

=== 2014 by-election ===
2014 Willoughby mayoral by-election
Party	Candidate	Votes	%	±%
Independent Liberal	Stuart Coppock	6,259	20.83	−25.91
Independent Liberal	Tony Mustaca	6,163	20.52	+20.52
Independent Liberal	Gail Giles-Gidney	6,144	20.45	+20.45
Independent	John C. Owen	5,036	16.76	+16.76
Labor	Nic Wright	1,950	6.49	+6.49
Independent	Wendy Norton	1,565	5.21	+5.21
Independent	John Owens	1,389	4.62	+4.62
Independent Liberal	James Flynn	673	2.24	+2.24
Independent	David Stickland	475	1.58	+1.58
Independent	Steven Willoughby	387	1.29	+1.29
Total formal votes		30,041	96.26	+1.89
Informal votes		1,152	3.74	−1.89
Turnout		31,193	68.74	
Notional three-candidate-preferred count
Independent Liberal	Stuart Coppock	7,771	35.04	
Independent Liberal	Gail Giles-Gidney	7,421	33.47	
Independent Liberal	Tony Mustaca	6,980	31.48	
Two-candidate-preferred result
Independent Liberal	Gail Giles-Gidney	9,094	50.80	+50.80
Independent Liberal	Stuart Coppock	8,806	49.20	+2.46
Independent Liberal gain from Independent		Swing	N/A	

=== 2012 ===
2012 New South Wales mayoral elections: Willoughby
Party	Candidate	Votes	%	±%
Independent	Pat Reilly	17,470	53.3	
Independent Liberal	Stuart Coppock	15,330	46.7	
Total formal votes		32,800	94.4	
Informal votes		1,959	5.6	
Turnout		34,759		
Independent hold		Swing		
