= 2014 Willoughby mayoral by-election =

- 12 April 2014
- Turnout: 68.74%
| | First party | Second party | Third party |
|---|---|---|---|
| | IND | IND | IND |
| Candidate | Stuart Coppock | Tony Mustaca | Gail Giles-Gidney |
| Party | Ind. Liberal | Ind. Liberal | Ind. Liberal |
| Popular vote | 6,259 | 6,163 | 6,144 |
| Percentage | 20.83% | 20.52% | 20.45% |
| Swing | ▼25.91 | ▲20.52 | ▲20.45 |
| Notional 3CP | 35.04% | 31.48% | 33.47% |
| 2CP | 49.20% | | 50.80% |
| 2CP swing | ▲2.46 | | ▲50.80 |
Mayor before election
Pat Reilly
Independent
Elected Mayor
Gail Giles-Gidney
Independent Liberal

The 2014 Willoughby mayoral by-election was held on 15 November 2014 to elect the mayor of Willoughby, a local government area in New South Wales, Australia. The by-election was held following the death of incumbent mayor Pat Reilly.

Although she finished in third place on first preferences, Independent Liberal candidate Gail Giles-Gidney won the by-election with 50.8% of the vote after preference distribution.

== Background ==
=== Pat Reilly death ===
On 21 January 2014, mayor Pat Reilly died following a short illness. He had been a councillor since 1987, served as mayor since September 1997, and became the first directly elected Willoughby mayor in 1999.

Reilly's funeral was held one week later on 28 January, and was attended by around 1,000 people, including former prime minister Bob Hawke, then-federal treasurer Joe Hockey, and then-Willoughby MP (and future NSW premier) Gladys Berejiklian.

=== Previous election results ===
Reilly had most recently been re-elected in 2012, where he defeated his only opponent, Stuart Coppock, with 53.3% of the vote.

== Candidates ==
10 candidates contested the by-election, including independent candidates with highly similar names − John C. Owen and John Owens.

The Labor Party chose to endorse Independent Labor councillor Nic Wright as their candidate.

Candidates are listed in the order they appeared on the ballot:

| Party | Candidate | Background |
|---|---|---|
| Independent | David Stickland | Willoughby East resident |
| Labor | Nic Wright | Naremburn Ward councillor |
| Independent Liberal | James Flynn | West Ward candidate in 2012 |
| Independent | John C. Owen | Former General Manager of Willoughby City Council |
| Independent Liberal | Tony Mustaca | West Ward councillor |
| Independent | John Owens | Retired lawyer |
| Independent | Steven Willoughby | Naremburn resident |
| Independent Liberal | Stuart Coppock | Naremburn Ward councillor and 2012 mayoral candidate |
| Independent Liberal | Gail Giles-Gidney | Sailors Bay Ward councillor |
| Independent | Wendy Norton | Middle Harbour Ward councillor |

== Results ==
2014 Willoughby mayoral by-election
| Party | Candidate | Votes | % | ±% |
|---|---|---|---|---|
| Independent Liberal | Stuart Coppock | 6,259 | 20.83 | −25.91 |
| Independent Liberal | Tony Mustaca | 6,163 | 20.52 | +20.52 |
| Independent Liberal | Gail Giles-Gidney | 6,144 | 20.45 | +20.45 |
| Independent | John C. Owen | 5,036 | 16.76 | +16.76 |
| Labor | Nic Wright | 1,950 | 6.49 | +6.49 |
| Independent | Wendy Norton | 1,565 | 5.21 | +5.21 |
| Independent | John Owens | 1,389 | 4.62 | +4.62 |
| Independent Liberal | James Flynn | 673 | 2.24 | +2.24 |
| Independent | David Stickland | 475 | 1.58 | +1.58 |
| Independent | Steven Willoughby | 387 | 1.29 | +1.29 |
| Total formal votes | | 30,041 | 96.26 | +1.89 |
| Informal votes | | 1,152 | 3.74 | −1.89 |
| Turnout | | 31,193 | 68.74 | |
Notional three-candidate-preferred count
| Independent Liberal | Stuart Coppock | 7,771 | 35.04 | |
| Independent Liberal | Gail Giles-Gidney | 7,421 | 33.47 | |
| Independent Liberal | Tony Mustaca | 6,980 | 31.48 | |
Two-candidate-preferred result
| Independent Liberal | Gail Giles-Gidney | 9,094 | 50.80 | +50.80 |
| Independent Liberal | Stuart Coppock | 8,806 | 49.20 | +2.46 |
| Independent Liberal gain from Independent | | Swing | N/A | |

== See also ==
- 2014 Newcastle lord mayoral by-election
