= Electoral district of Sydney Hamlets (NSW Legislative Council) =

Former legislative council electoral district of New South Wales, Australia

Sydney Hamlets New South Wales—Legislative Council
- State: New South Wales
- Created: 1851
- Abolished: 1856
- Coordinates: 33°55′S 151°10′E

The Electoral district of Sydney Hamlets was an electorate of the New South Wales Legislative Council at a time when some of its members were elected and the balance were appointed by the Governor. It was a new electorate created in 1851 by the expansion of the Legislative Council to 54 members, with 18 to be appointed and 36 elected. The electoral district included what were then outer suburbs of Sydney and are now the inner suburbs of Glebe, Camperdown, O'Connell Town (north Newtown), Chippendale, Redfern, Surry Hills, Paddington, St Leonards and Balmain.

In 1856 the unicameral Legislative Council was abolished and replaced with an elected Legislative Assembly and an appointed Legislative Council. The district was represented by the Legislative Assembly electorate of Sydney Hamlets.

Thomas Smart won the first election, declared on 22 September 1851.

== Members ==
Member	Term
Thomas Smart	Sep 1851 – Feb 1855
Stuart Donaldson	Apr 1855 – Feb 1856

== Election results ==
=== 1851 ===
1851 New South Wales colonial election, 20 September: Sydney Hamlets
Candidate	Votes	%
Thomas Smart	255	52.04
William Thurlow	144	29.39
Joshua Josephson	91	18.57
Total votes	490	100

=== 1855 ===
Thomas Smart resigned in February 1855 to travel to England.

Sydney Hamlets by-election 21 February 1855
Candidate	Votes	%
Stuart Donaldson	427	59.64
Alexander Campbell	289	40.36
Total votes	716	100

== See also ==
- Members of the New South Wales Legislative Council, 1851–1856
