= Alfred Denison =

Australian politician

Alfred Denison was an Australian politician.

He was a non-elected member of the New South Wales Legislative Council from 13 October to 1 November 1851.
