= Electoral district of Pastoral Districts of Lachlan and Lower Darling =

1851–1856 electorate of the New South Wales Legislative Council

Pastoral Districts of Lachlan and Lower Darling New South Wales—Legislative Council
- State: New South Wales
- Created: 1851
- Abolished: 1856
- Namesake: Lachlan River & Darling River

The Electoral district of Pastoral Districts of Lachlan and Lower Darling was an electorate of the New South Wales Legislative Council at a time when some of its members were elected and the balance were appointed by the Governor. It was a new electorate created in 1851 by the expansion of the Legislative Council to 54, 18 to be appointed and 36 elected. The district covered the south west of New South Wales was named after the Lachlan and Darling Rivers. On its eastern side were the districts of County of Bathurst and Counties of King and Georgiana, to the north was the Pastoral Districts of Wellington and Bligh and to the south was the Counties of Murray and St Vincent. Polling was to occur in the towns of Binalong, Wagga Wagga, Balranald, Canowindra, Gundagai and Yass.

In 1856 the unicameral Legislative Council was abolished and replaced with an elected Legislative Assembly and an appointed Legislative Council. The district was represented by the Legislative Assembly electorate of Lachlan and Lower Darling.

== Members ==
| Member | Term |
|---|---|
| William Macarthur | Sep 1851 – Jan 1855 |
| William Macleay | Mar 1855 – Feb 1856 |

William Macleay went on to represent Lachlan and Lower Darling in the Legislative Assembly from 1856.

== Election results ==
=== 1851 ===
1851 New South Wales colonial election, 26 September: Pastoral Districts of Lachlan and Lower Darling
| Candidate | Votes | % |
|---|---|---|
| William Macarthur | unopposed | |

=== 1855 by-election ===
William Macarthur resigned in January 1855.

Pastoral Districts of Lachlan and Lower Darling by-election March 1855
| Candidate | Votes | % |
|---|---|---|
| William Macleay | | |
| Daniel Henry Thorn | | |
| Total votes | | |
