= Electoral district of Western Boroughs (NSW Legislative Council) =

Former New South Wales Legislative Council electoral district

Western Boroughs New South Wales—Legislative Council
- State: New South Wales
- Created: 1851
- Abolished: 1856
- Coordinates: 32°25′12″S 149°34′40″E

The Electoral district of Western Boroughs was an electorate of the New South Wales Legislative Council at a time when some of its members were elected and the balance were appointed by the Governor. It was a new electorate created in 1851 by the expansion of the Legislative Council to 54, 18 to be appointed and 36 elected. The district consisted of the towns of Bathurst, Carcoar and Kelso, while the surrounding rural areas were in the County of Bathurst and in Cook and Westmoreland.

In 1856 the unicameral Legislative Council was abolished and replaced with an elected Legislative Assembly and an appointed Legislative Council. The district was represented by the Legislative Assembly electorate of Western Boroughs.

== Members ==
| Member | Term |
|---|---|
| Arthur Holroyd | Sep 1851 – Feb 1856 |

Arthur Holroyd went on to represent Western Boroughs in the Legislative Assembly from 1856.

== Election results ==
=== 1851 ===
1851 New South Wales colonial election, 22 September: Western Boroughs
| Candidate | Votes | % |
|---|---|---|
| Arthur Holroyd | unopposed | |
