= Electoral district of City of Sydney =

Electorate of the New South Wales Legislative Council

City of Sydney New South Wales—Legislative Council
- State: New South Wales
- Created: 1843
- Abolished: 1856
- Namesake: Sydney
- Coordinates: 33°52′S 151°13′E

The Electoral district of City of Sydney was an electorate of the New South Wales Legislative Council.

It was created by the 1843 Electoral Districts Act and initially called the electoral district of Town of Sydney and a first returned two members. With the expansion of the Council in 1851 it elected three members.

In 1856 the unicameral Legislative Council was abolished and replaced with an elected Legislative Assembly and an appointed Legislative Council. The district was represented by the Legislative Assembly electorate of Sydney City.

== Members ==
Member 1	Term	Member 2	Term		
William Wentworth	June 1843 – April 1854	William Bland	June 1843 – June 1848		
William Wentworth	June 1843 – April 1854	Robert Lowe	July 1848 – November 1849		
William Wentworth	June 1843 – April 1854	William Bland	December 1849 – June 1850		
William Wentworth	June 1843 – April 1854	John Dunmore Lang	July 1850 – October 1851	Member 3	Term
William Wentworth	June 1843 – April 1854	Robert Campbell	November 1851 – February 1856	John Lamb	September 1851 – February 1853
Henry Parkes	May 1854 – February 1856	Robert Campbell	November 1851 – February 1856	William Thurlow	March 1853 – January 1855
Henry Parkes	May 1854 – February 1856	Robert Campbell	November 1851 – February 1856	James Robert Wilshire	January 1855 – February 1856

== Election results ==
=== 1843 ===
Two members to be elected

1843 New South Wales colonial election, 15 June: Town of Sydney
Candidate	Votes	%
William Wentworth	1,275	32.10
William Bland	1,261	31.75
Maurice O'Connell Jr.	733	18.45
Robert Cooper	365	9.19
William Hustler	338	8.51
Total votes	3,972	100.00

=== 1848 ===
1848 New South Wales colonial election, 28 July: City of Sydney
Candidate	Votes	%
William Wentworth (elected 1)	1,168	29
Robert Lowe (elected 2)	1,012	25
John Lamb	950	24
William Bland	874	22
Total votes	4,004	100

=== 1849 by-election ===
Robert Lowe resigned in November 1849.

City of Sydney by-election 18 December 1849
Candidate	Votes	%
William Bland	599	55.77
Adam Bogue	258	24.02
James Wilshire	217	10.74
Total votes	1,074	100.00
Voter turnout	22.70%	

=== 1850 by-election ===
William Bland resigned in June 1850.

City of Sydney by-election 24 July 1850
Candidate	Votes	%
John Lang	970	50.65
John Holden	945	49.35
Total votes	1,915	100.00
Voter turnout	49.08%	

=== 1851 ===
1851 New South Wales colonial election, 16 September: City of Sydney
Candidate	Votes	%
John Lang	1,197	24.13
William Wentworth	1,004	20.24
John Lamb	998	20.12
Alexander Longmore	888	17.90
Charles Cowper	873	17.60
Total votes	4,960	100.00

=== 1851 by-election ===
John Lang resigned in November 1851.

City of Sydney by-election 18 November 1851
Candidate	Votes	%
Robert Campbell	1,306	70.79
Adolphus Young	539	29.21
Total votes	1,845	100.00

=== 1853 by-election ===
John Lamb resigned in February 1853.

City of Sydney by-election 10 March 1853
Candidate	Votes	%
William Thurlow	1,249	69.43
Henry Parkes	466	25.90
Thomas Holt	84	4.67
Total votes	1,799	100.00

=== 1854 by-election ===
William Wentworth resigned in April 1854 from the Legislative Council while he went to England to watch over the progress of the Constitution Bill in the British parliament.

City of Sydney by-election 2 May 1854
Candidate	Votes	%
Henry Parkes	1,427	64.69
Charles Kemp	779	35.31
Total votes	2,206	100.00

=== 1855 by-election ===
William Thurlow resigned in January 1855.

City of Sydney by-election 18 November 1851
Candidate	Votes	%
James Wilshire	unopposed	

== See also ==
- Members of the New South Wales Legislative Council, 1843–1851 and 1851-1856
