= Electoral district of Counties of Cook and Westmoreland =

Former legislative council electoral district of New South Wales, Australia

Counties of Cook and Westmoreland New South Wales—Legislative Council
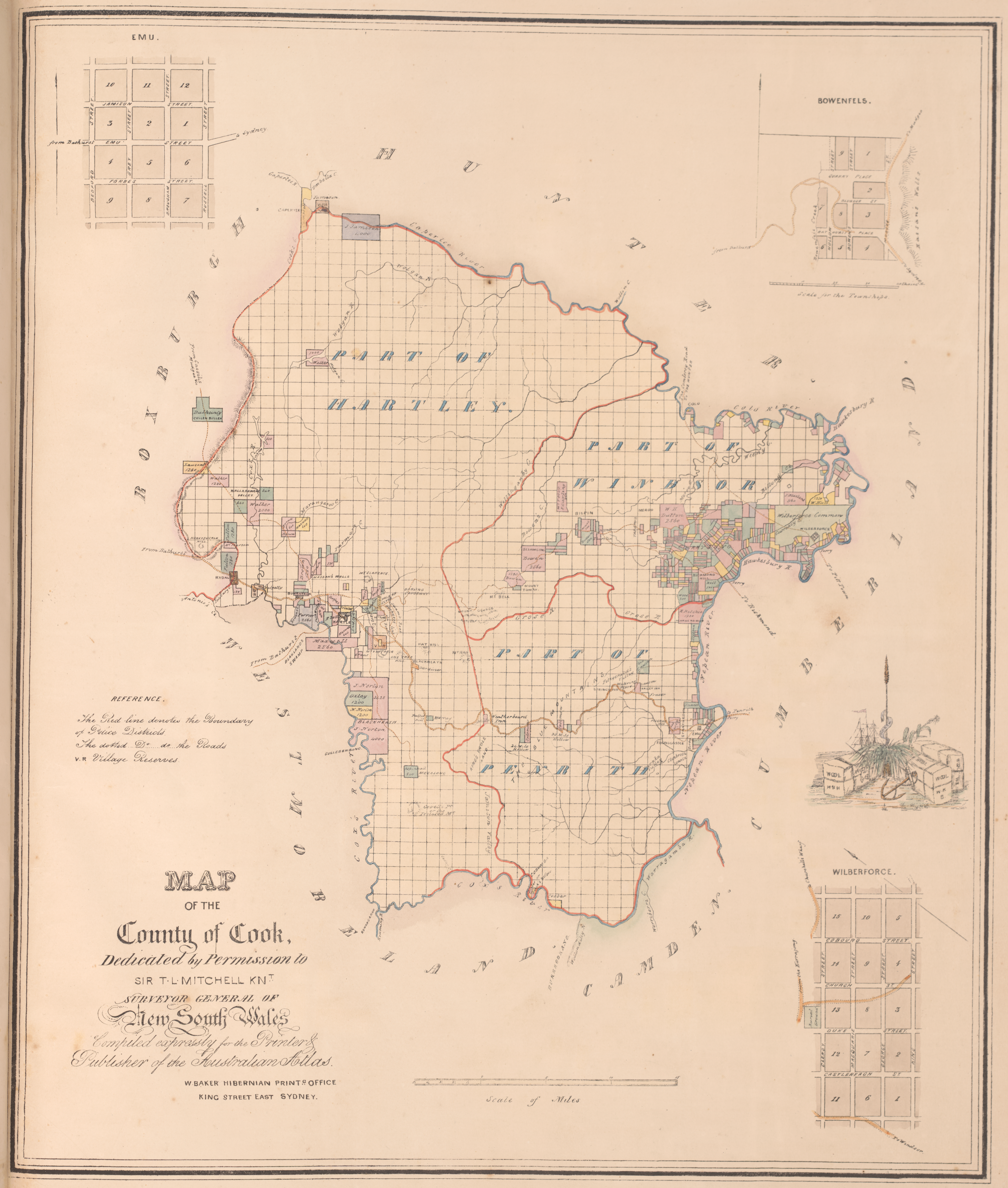
- Cook county in the 1840s
- State: New South Wales
- Created: 1843
- Abolished: 1856
- Namesake: Cook & Westmoreland counties
- Coordinates: 33°32′S 150°7′E

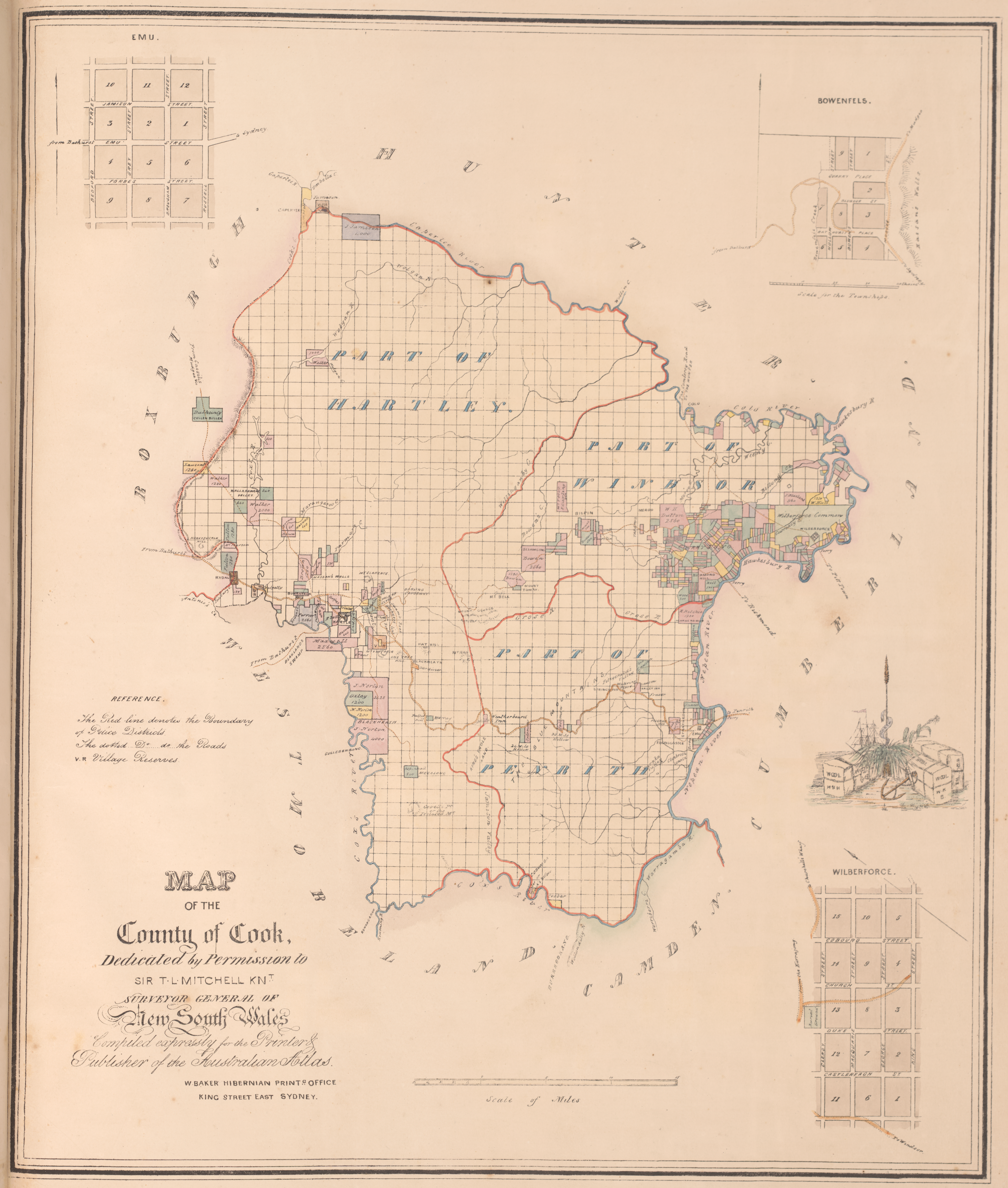
Westmoreland county in the 1840s

The Electoral district of Counties of Cook and Westmoreland, also known as the United Midland Counties of Cook and Westmoreland, was an electorate of the New South Wales Legislative Council at a time when some of its members were elected and the balance were appointed by the Governor.

It was created by the Electoral Act 1843 and returned one member. named after Cook and Westmoreland counties two of the original Nineteen Counties in New South Wales, covering the Blue Mountains, Lithgow and Oberon areas, including the towns of Hartley, Penrith and Wilberforce. Polling also took place at nearby towns such as Bathurst and North Richmond, however they were not in the district.

In 1856 the unicameral Legislative Council was abolished and replaced with an elected Legislative Assembly and an appointed Legislative Council. The district was represented by the two member Legislative Assembly electorate of Cook and Westmoreland and James Martin, was re-elected along with Robert Jamison.

== Members ==
Member	Term
John Panton	Jun 1843 – Jun 1848
James Martin	Jul 1848 – Feb 1856

== Election results ==
There were three elections held in the district.

=== 1843 ===
1843 New South Wales colonial election, 16 June: Counties of Cook and Westmoreland
Candidate	Votes	%
John Panton	112	65.12
George Bowman	60	34.88
Total votes	172	100.00

=== 1848 ===
1848 New South Wales colonial election, 29 July: Counties of Cook and Westmoreland
Candidate	Votes	%
James Martin (elected)	103	66
Alfred Cheeke	54	34
Total votes	157	100

The election of James Martin was declared void on the grounds that he was not qualified to stand; however, he was re-elected unopposed. Martin subsequently sued the Speaker of the Legislative Council, Charles Nicholson and the Sergeant at Arms, William Christie, for trespass for having him removed when there had been no decision of the Electoral Court in accordance with the Electoral Act 1843. The Full Court of the Supreme Court held that under the Electoral Act 1843 it was only the Electoral Court that could determine there was a vacancy and not the Governor.

=== 1851 ===
1851 New South Wales colonial election, 23 September: Counties of Cook and Westmoreland
Candidate	Votes	%
James Martin	94	57.32
Alexander Longmore	70	42.68
Total votes	164	100

== See also ==
- Members of the New South Wales Legislative Council, 1843–1851 and 1851-1856
