= Thomas Smart (New South Wales politician) =

Australian politician (1810–1881)

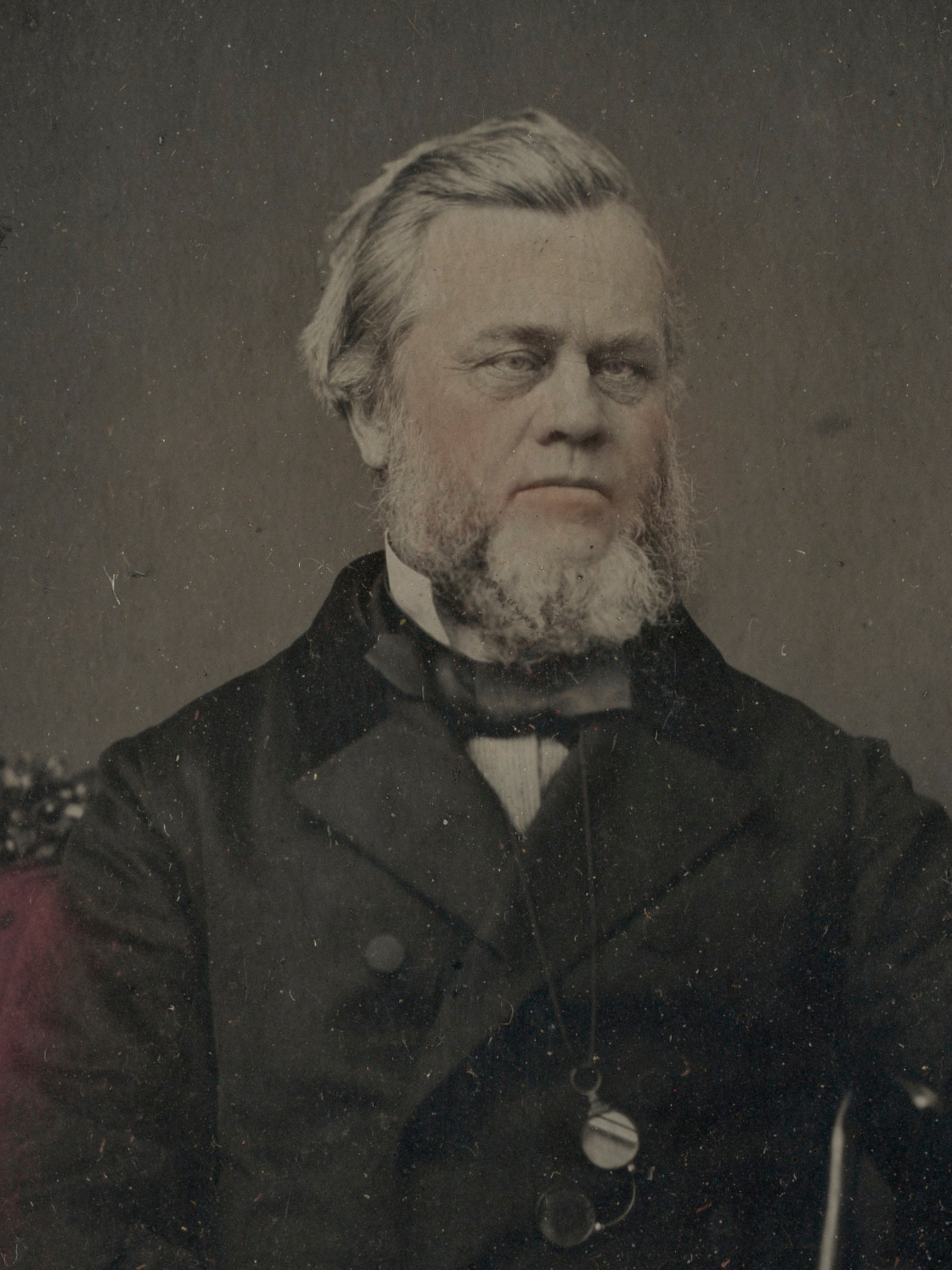
Thomas Ware Smart

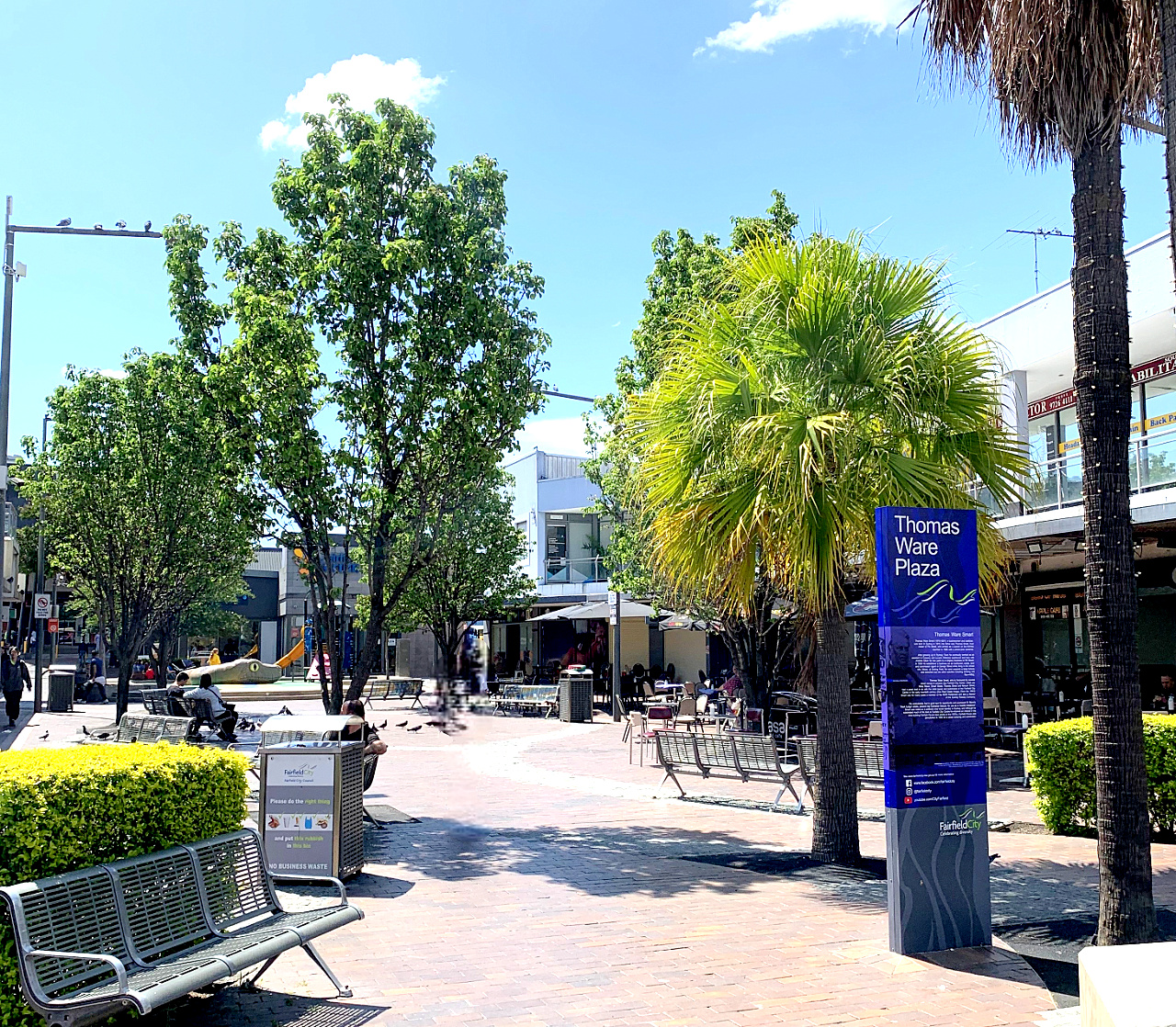
Thomas Ware Plaza in Fairfield, which was named after Smart

Thomas Ware Smart (1810 – 28 May 1881), was a politician in colonial New South Wales, Colonial Treasurer in 1863 and 1865.

== Biography ==
Smart was born in Sydney, New South Wales, Australia. He was the representative for Sydney Hamlets in the New South Wales Legislative Council from 1 September 1851 to 28 February 1855. He represented Glebe in the New South Wales Legislative Assembly from 1860 to 1869. He was Treasurer from 21 March to 15 October 1863 and from 3 February to 19 October 1865; he was also Secretary for Public Works from 20 October 1865 to 21 January 1866. He was again appointed to the Legislative Council in 1870 and served until his death.

Smart died at Darling Point in Sydney on 28 May 1881 (aged 70–71).

Political offices
| Preceded by Elias Weekes | Colonial Treasurer; Mar – Oct 1863 | Succeeded by Geoffrey Eagar |
| Preceded by Geoffrey Eagar | Colonial Treasurer; Feb – Oct 1865 | Succeeded by Saul Samuel |
| Preceded by William Arnold | Secretary for Public Works; Oct 1865 – Jan 1866 | Succeeded by Arthur Holroyd |
New South Wales Legislative Council
| Preceded by Sir George Allen | Member for Sydney Hamlets; Sep 1851 – Feb 1855 | Succeeded by Stuart Donaldson |
New South Wales Legislative Assembly
| Preceded by John Campbell | Member for Glebe; Dec 1860 – Nov 1869 | Succeeded by Sir George Allen |
