= Charles Wray Finch =

English-born Australian politician

Charles Wray Finch (1809 – 6 May 1873) was an English-born Australian politician.

He was born at Great Henny in Essex, the son of Henry Finch. He joined the army in 1830 and migrated to Sydney in 1831, after which he left the military. From 1831 to 1838 he was the police magistrate at Patrick's Plains, and farmed near Wellington. On 4 June 1837 he married Emily Elizabeth Wilson. In 1852 he moved to Parramatta, and from 1853 to 1856 was an elected member of the New South Wales Legislative Council. From 1860 to 1873 he was serjeant-at-arms of the Legislative Assembly. Finch died in Sydney in 1873.
