= John Stirling (New South Wales politician) =

Australian politician

John Stirling was an Australian politician.

He was New South Wales' Chief Inspector of Distilleries from 1847 to 1859, and was also acting Auditor-General from 1854 to 1856, during which time he was also a member of the New South Wales Legislative Council.
