= Augustus Morris =

Australian politician

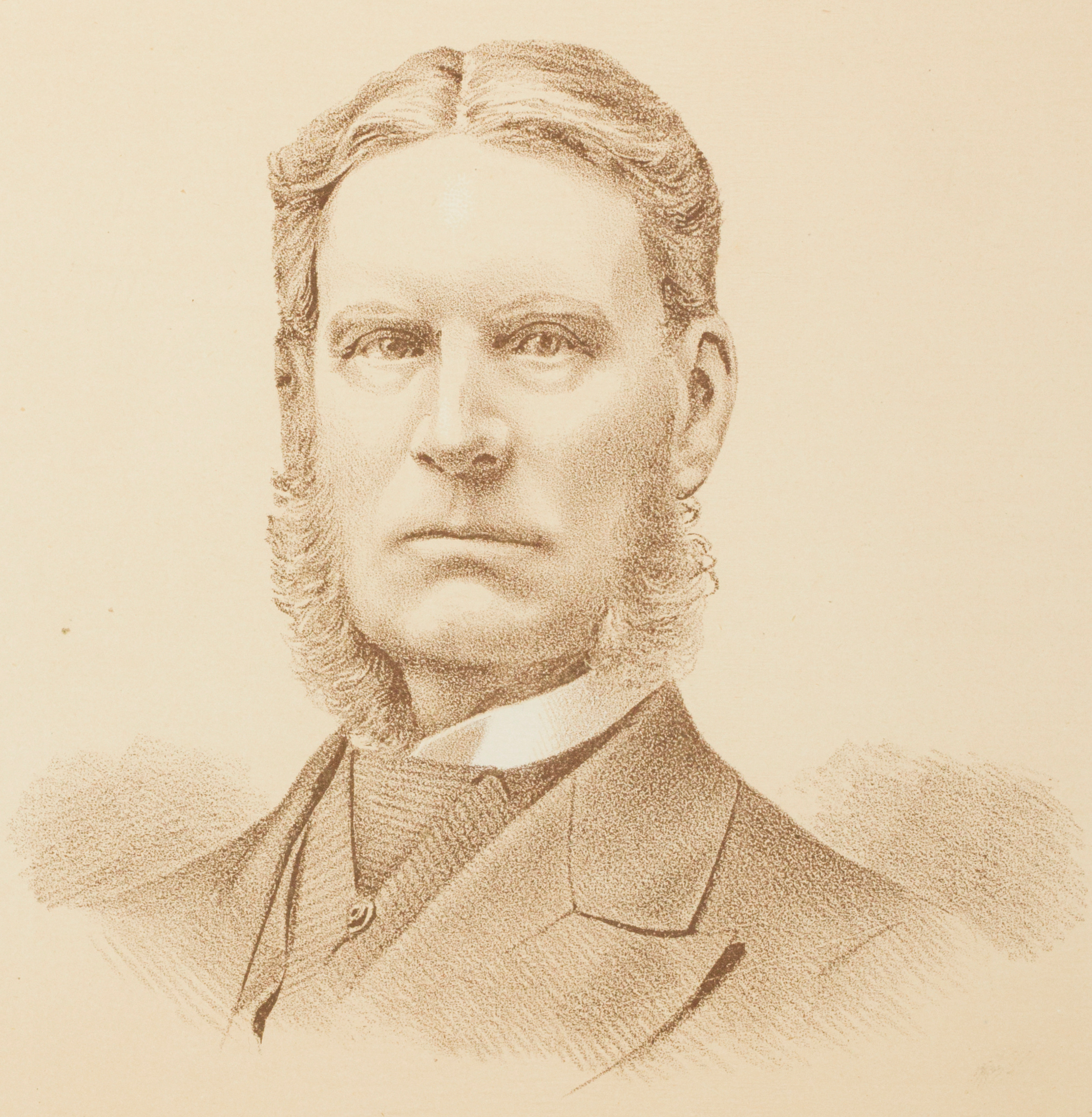
Augustus Morris

Augustus Morris (c. 1820 – 29 August 1895) was a pastoralist and politician in New South Wales, Australia.

He was born in Van Diemen's Land around 1820 to ex-convict and farmer Augustus Morris and Constantia Hibbins. He was educated at Hobart and helped explore Port Phillip. He married Sarah Merciana Charlotte Bailey, with whom he had four sons. He later farmed sheep in New South Wales, and from 1851 to 1856 served in the New South Wales Legislative Council as the member for Pastoral Districts of Liverpool Plains & Gwydir. In 1859 he was elected to the New South Wales Legislative Assembly for Balranald, serving until his defeat in 1864. He was bankrupted in 1866 and discharged the following year, becoming an agent for a number of United States–based companies.

Morris died at Manly on 29 August 1895 (aged ~ 75).

Parliament of New South Wales
New South Wales Legislative Council
New district	Member for Pastoral Districts of Liverpool Plains & Gwydir; 1851–1856	Council replaced
New South Wales Legislative Assembly
New seat	Member for Balranald; 1859–1864	Succeeded by Joseph Phelps
