= James Martin (premier) =

Australian politician (1820–1886)

The Honourable Sir James Martin QC
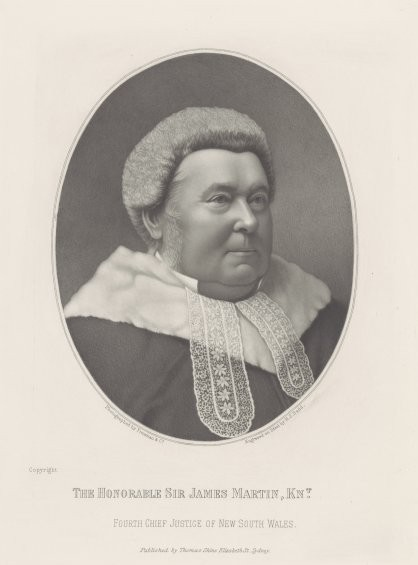

6th Premier of New South Wales
- In office 16 October 1863 – 2 February 1865
- Preceded by: Charles Cowper
- Succeeded by: Charles Cowper
- Constituency: Tumut (until 1864); Monaro
- In office 22 January 1866 – 26 October 1868
- Preceded by: Charles Cowper
- Succeeded by: John Robertson
- Constituency: Lachlan
- In office 16 December 1870 – 13 May 1872
- Preceded by: Charles Cowper
- Succeeded by: Henry Parkes

Chief Justice of New South Wales
- In office 19 November 1873 – 4 November 1886
- Preceded by: Sir Alfred Stephen
- Succeeded by: Sir Julian Salomons

Personal details
- Born: 14 May 1820 Midleton, County Cork, Ireland,
- Died: 4 November 1886 (aged 66) Potts Point, New South Wales
- Resting place: St Jude's Randwick Cemetery
- Relations: Florence Martin (daughter)

Sir James Martin, QC (14 May 1820 – 4 November 1886) was three times Premier of New South Wales, and Chief Justice of New South Wales from 1873 to 1886.

== Early career ==
Martin was born in Midleton, County Cork, Ireland but emigrated with his parents to Sydney, Australia at the age of one. He studied at Dame's School, Parramatta and, despite his family's poverty, the Sydney Academy and Sydney College under the tutelage of William Timothy Cape. He left school at the age of 16 to become a reporter.

In 1838, Martin published the Australian Sketch Book, a series of character sketches he dedicated to Sydney barrister Bob Nichols, for whom he was then working as an articled clerk in 1840.

Martin qualified as a solicitor in 1845 and combined his legal career with employment as a newspaper editor and publisher. He married Isabella Long on 20 January 1853, and together had 15 children.

== Early political career ==
In February 1848, Martin was nominated as a candidate for a by-election for the electorate of Durham in the New South Wales Legislative Council, but withdrew before polling day. In the general election held later in the same year, he was a candidate for the electorate of Counties of Cook and Westmoreland, which he won with a margin of 16%. His election however was declared void on the grounds that he did not meet the property qualifications to stand, however, he was re-elected unopposed. Martin subsequently sued the Speaker of the Legislative Council, Charles Nicholson and the Sergeant at Arms, William Christie, for having him removed when there had been no decision of the Electoral Court in accordance with the Electoral Act 1843. The Full Court of the Supreme Court held that, under the Electoral Act 1843, it was only the Electoral Court that could determine that there was a vacancy, not the Governor.

Martin was an effective legislator, but his sharp tongue and intemperate speeches to the House made him few friends among his parliamentary colleagues. His most notable political achievement in his first eight years in office was to initiate the Parliamentary debate that led to the establishment of a branch of the royal mint in Sydney.

In 1856, the partly elected unicameral Legislative Council was abolished and replaced with a new parliament with elected members of the Legislative Assembly and appointed members of the Legislative Council. Martin was elected as one of two members for Cook and Westmoreland. When that electorate was largely replaced by the single-member electorate of Hartley, Martin successfully stood for the new four-member electorate of East Sydney. He was subsequently the member for Orange, Tumut, Monaro, Lachlan and East Macquarie. In August 1856 he was made Attorney-General of New South Wales in the first ministry of Charles Cowper. The appointment was controversial, as Martin was the first holder of the office who had not been admitted as a barrister. He had to resign his seat as a result of accepting the office, however, he was re-elected unopposed. The appointment was brief, as the government was defeated in a no-confidence motion in October 1856 and Martin returned to the backbench.

Martin was admitted to the bar in 1856 and was made a Queen's Counsel in 1857. He returned as Attorney General in the second Cowper Ministry in September 1857, and was again re-elected unopposed. As Attorney General, however, his reputation for intemperate language continued. After a series of conflicts with fellow Ministers, he resigned the office in November 1858.

== Premier of New South Wales ==
In October 1863, Martin was asked by the Governor of New South Wales to form a government with a mandate to address rising State deficits and rural unemployment. As Premier and Colonial Secretary, Martin promptly introduced measures to reduce immigration and increase tariffs, but was unable to secure Parliamentary support for many of his reforms. With limited achievements to its credit, the government suffered a substantial swing at the 1865 election and Martin stepped down to make way for the return of Charles Cowper.

Cowper was once again defeated in a no-confidence motion in December 1865, and in January 1866 Martin became Premier for the second time as leader of a coalition government with former rival Henry Parkes. His government resigned in October 1868, but he returned to the Premiership for a third and final time between December 1870 and May 1872.

== After politics ==
Martin retired from Parliament in November 1873 and was immediately named to the vacant position of Chief Justice of New South Wales. He held the post for 13 years, despite considerable ill health in later life.

James Martin died at home in Potts Point, Sydney on 4 November 1886 and was buried in St Jude's Randwick Cemetery. In 1909, his remains were moved to a new underground vault in the Waverley Cemetery.

== Honours ==
Martin was made a Queen's Counsel in 1857, and was knighted in 1869. Martin Place, a pedestrian mall in the central business district of Sydney was named after him in 1892. 'Lady Martin Beach,' a small beach accessible to the public from Wolseley Road, Point Piper is named after his wife, Isabella who resided at a nearby Woollahra House. Late in 2020, two new identical statues were put up in Parramatta and Martin Place as he used to go from Parramatta to Martin Place for school.

== See also ==
- First Martin ministry (1863–1865)
- Second Martin ministry (1866–1868)
- Third Martin ministry (1870–1872)
- 140-142 Cumberland Street, The Rocks
- List of judges of the Supreme Court of New South Wales

== Notes ==
Political offices
Preceded by Charles Cowper	Premier of New South Wales; 1863–1865	Succeeded by Charles Cowper
Preceded by Charles Cowper	Premier of New South Wales; 1866–1868	Succeeded by John Robertson
Preceded by Charles Cowper	Premier of New South Wales; 1870–1872	Succeeded by Henry Parkes
New South Wales Legislative Council
Preceded by John Panton	Member for Counties of Cook & Westmoreland; 1848–1856	Council replaced by new Parliament
New South Wales Legislative Assembly
New assembly	Member for Cook and Westmoreland; 1856–1859; Served alongside: Jamison	District largely replaced by Hartley
New district	Member for East Sydney; 1859–1860; Served alongside: Black, Cowper/Faucett, Parkes	Succeeded by John Caldwell
Preceded by John Peisley	Member for Orange; 1862–1863	Succeeded by Charles Cowper, Jr.
Preceded by Charles Cowper, Jr.	Member for Tumut; 1863–1864	Succeeded by Charles Cowper, Jr.
Preceded by Thomas Garrett	Member for Monaro; 1864–1865	Succeeded by William Grahame
Preceded by John Ryan	Member for Lachlan; 1864–1869	Succeeded by James Watson
Preceded by Robert Stewart	Member for East Sydney; 1869–1872; Served alongside: Buchanan, King, Parkes/Wilson	Succeeded by John Macintosh
Preceded by John Suttor	Member for East Macquarie; 1872–1873	Succeeded by Walter Cooper
Legal offices
Preceded by Sir Alfred Stephen	Chief Justice of New South Wales; 1873–1886	Succeeded by Sir Julian Salomons
