= Electoral district of Pastoral Districts of Liverpool Plains and Gwydir =

Former legislative council electoral district of New South Wales, Australia

Pastoral Districts of Liverpool Plains and Gwydir New South Wales—Legislative Council
- State: New South Wales
- Created: 1851
- Abolished: 1856
- Namesake: Liverpool Plains & Gwydir River

The Electoral district of Pastoral Districts of Liverpool Plains and Gwydir was an electorate of the New South Wales Legislative Council at a time when some of its members were elected and the balance were appointed by the Governor. It was a new electorate created in 1851 by the expansion of the Legislative Council to 54, 18 to be appointed and 36 elected. The district was named after the Liverpool Plains and Gwydir River and covered what is now known as the North West Slopes region. On its eastern side was the Pastoral Districts of New England and Macleay and to the south was the Pastoral Districts of Wellington and Bligh. Polling was to occur in the towns of Murrurundi, Tamworth, Wee Waa, Warialda and the Woolshed on the Namoi River.

In 1856 the unicameral Legislative Council was abolished and replaced with an elected Legislative Assembly and an appointed Legislative Council. The district was represented by the Legislative Assembly electorate of Liverpool Plains and Gwydir.

== Members ==
Member	Term
Augustus Morris	Sep 1851 – Feb 1856

== Election results ==
=== 1851 ===
1851 New South Wales colonial election, 22 September: Pastoral Districts of Liverpool Plains and Gwydir
Candidate	Votes	%
Augustus Morris	unopposed	
