= Electoral district of Pastoral District of Murrumbidgee =

Former legislative council electoral district of New South Wales, Australia

Pastoral District of Murrumbidgee New South Wales—Legislative Council
- State: New South Wales
- Created: 1851
- Abolished: 1856

The Electoral district of Pastoral District of Murrumbidgee was an electorate of the New South Wales Legislative Council at a time when some of its members were elected and the balance were appointed by the Governor. It was a new electorate created in 1851 by the expansion of the Legislative Council to 54, 18 to be appointed and 36 elected. The district is located in the west of the state and was named after the Murrumbidgee River. Polling was to occur in the towns of Tumut, Gundagai, Albury, Wagga Wagga, Moulamein and Yass.

In 1856 the unicameral Legislative Council was abolished and replaced with an elected Legislative Assembly and an appointed Legislative Council. The district was represented by the Legislative Assembly electorate of Murrumbidgee.

== Members ==
Member	Term
George Macleay	Sep 1851 – Feb 1856

== Election results ==
=== 1851 ===
1851 New South Wales colonial election, 24 September: Pastoral District of Murrumbidgee
Candidate	Votes	%
George Macleay	unopposed	
