= John Panton (Australian politician) =

Australian politician

Member of the New South Wales Legislative Council
- In office June 1843 – June 1849
- Constituency: Counties of Cook and Westmoreland

Member of the Queensland Legislative Council
- In office 22 February 1866 – 2 September 1866

Personal details
- Born: John Panton; 29 October 1815 North Leith, Midlothian, Scotland
- Died: 2 September 1866 (aged 50) Ipswich, Queensland, Australia
- Resting place: Ipswich General Cemetery
- Spouse: Isabella Frederica North (m.1842 d.1880)
- Occupation: Businessman, magistrate

John Panton (29 October 1815 – 2 September 1866) was a politician in Australia. He was a Member of the New South Wales Legislative Council, and a Member of the Queensland Legislative Council.

== Early life ==
John Panton was born on 29 October 1815 in North Leith, Midlothian, Scotland, the son of George (Baillie) Panton and his wife Maria Kerr. In 1818, the family immigrated to New South Wales on the General Stewart. His father became the Postmaster-General of New South Wales.

== Business life ==
In about 1840, he established a merchant business, Betts & Panton, with John Betts (who had married John Panton's sister Margaret); they conducted business in Windsor and Sydney. In 1842, he married Isabella Frederica North at Windor; they had seven sons and five daughters. He toured the Moreton Bay district of New South Wales and decided that there were good opportunities there. In 1851 he relocated to Ipswich and established a mercantile business in Brisbane Street. In 1858, he commissioned a large residence called Claremont, but a downturn in his finances forced him to sell it in 1863 to George Thorn (senior). In 1865 the family built another house also called Claremont at 5 Blackall Street, East Ipswich.

He was a trustee of the Ipswich Grammar School.

== Politics ==
Panton was elected to the New South Wales Legislative Council representing the Counties of Cook and Westmoreland on 1 June 1843; he held that role until 20 June 1848.

Panton was appointed to the Queensland Legislative Council on 22 February 1866 and served until his death on 2 September 1866.

== Later life ==
John Panton died in Ipswich on 2 September 1866 at his home (the second Claremont) from apoplexy. He was buried in Ipswich General Cemetery.

== Legacy ==
There is a memorial tablet for John Panton in St Pauls Anglican Church.

His residence (the first) Claremont is now listed on the Queensland Heritage Register.
