= James Bettington =

Australian politician

James Brindley Bettington (1796 – 2 August 1857) was an English-born Australian politician.

He was born in Bristol to John Bettington; he was a grandson of engineer James Brindley. He was a general merchant in London before migrating to Sydney in 1827. He ran sheep studs and also ran a wool brokers' firm. He was a shipowner, a shipping agent and magistrate, and bred horses near Rooty Hill. Among the ships he owned, or part-owned, were two whaling vessels.

Soon after he set up his business he became magistrate and joined the Agricultural and Horticultural Society. On 7 June 1830 he married Rebecca Lawson, with whom he had six children. A few years later the couple decided to move near Bathhurst to closer to Rebecca's father William Lawson In 1830 he won the Produce Stakes and 1831 won the Agricultural Show award for the best colonial-bred horse. In 1837 he retired from his business interests and expanded his land, purchasing further property around and over the Liverpool Range. In 1840 he purchased a property called Oatlands near Parramatta from Perry Simpson. He was a trustee of All Saints' Church of England, Parramatta and in 1852 became district warden of the area. From 1851 to 1853 he was an elected member of the New South Wales Legislative Council. Bettington died at Plymouth in 1857.
