= Francis Lord =

Australian politician (1812–1897)

Francis Lord (1812 – 21 December 1897), often referred to as Frank Lord, was an Australian politician.

Lord was born in Sydney the second son of Mary Hyde and Simeon Lord, an ex-convict turned entrepreneur and later magistrate. He ran a store at Bathurst before becoming a pastoralist at Cumnock. On 6 April 1839 he married Mary Ainsworth (or Hanesworth), with whom he had seven children. He was a member of the New South Wales Legislative Council from 1843 to 1848 as the elected member for the County of Bathurst. He unsuccessfully stood for election for Bathurst in 1848, and 1851. He was appointed for five years from 1856 to 1861 and a life appointment from 1864 sitting until 1893 when his seat was declared vacant having not attended for two consecutive sessions. Lord died at Rydal in 1897.

His brother George (1818–1880), was also a member of parliament, initially in the first Legislative Assembly in 1856, becoming Colonial Treasurer from December 1870 to May 1872. George joined Francis in the Legislative Council in 1877.

New South Wales Legislative Council
New creation	Member for County of Bathurst; Jul 1843 – Feb 1846	Succeeded by John Darvall
