= Electoral district of Town of Parramatta =

Former legislative council electoral district of New South Wales, Australia

Town of Parramatta New South Wales—Legislative Council
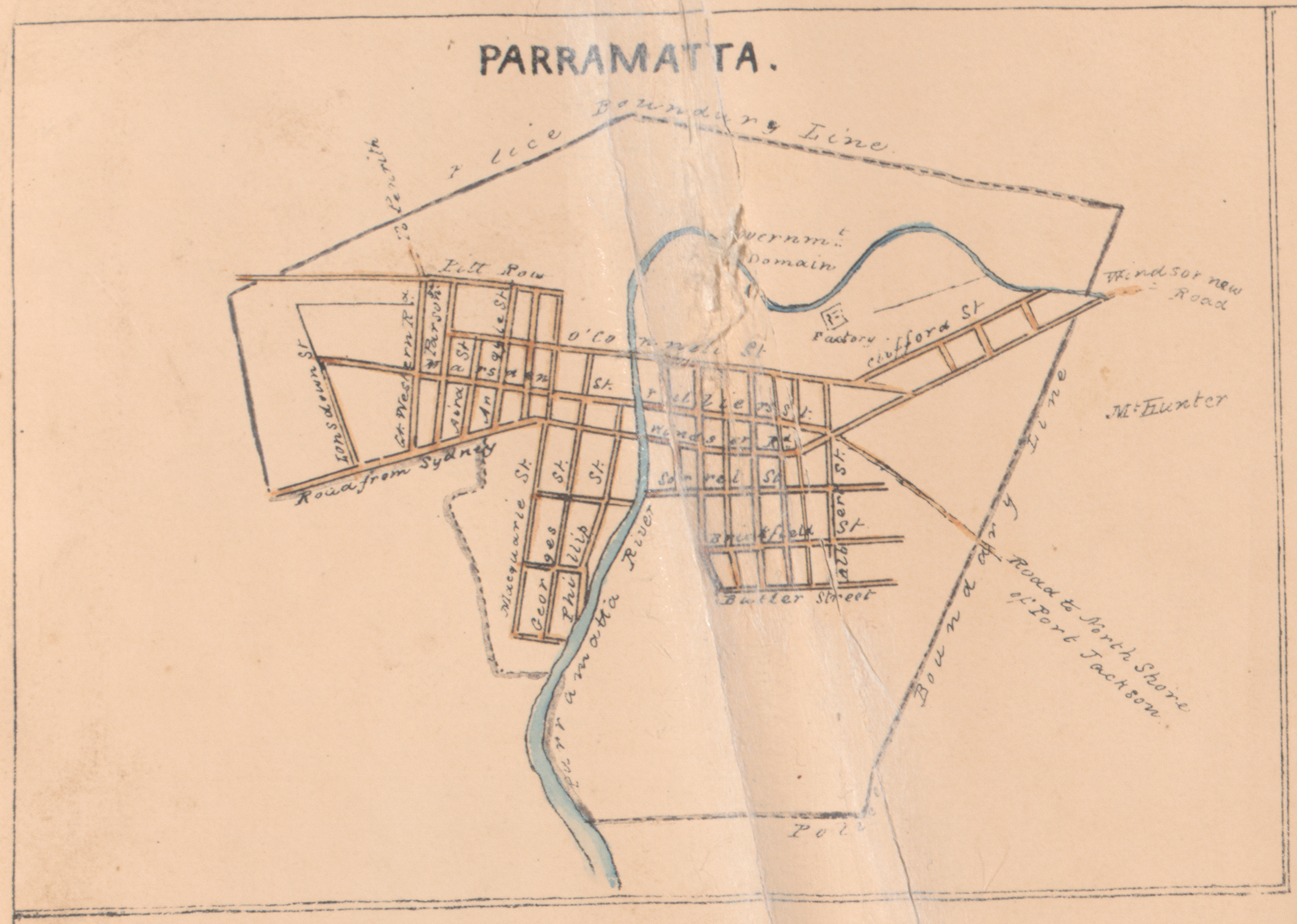
- Map of the Town of Parramatta, 1840s
- State: New South Wales
- Created: 1843
- Abolished: 1851
- Namesake: Parramatta
- Coordinates: 33°48′54″S 151°00′4″E

The Electoral district of Town of Parramatta was an electorate of the partially elected New South Wales Legislative Council, created for the first elections for the Council in 1843, at the time the principal residence of the Governor Sir Charles FitzRoy. Polling took place at Parramatta. In 1856, the unicameral Legislative Council was abolished and replaced with an elected Legislative Assembly and an appointed Legislative Council. The district was represented by the Legislative Assembly Parramatta, the only electorate to have existed continuously since the first Legislative Assembly election in 1856.

== Members ==
Member 1	Term
Hannibal Macarthur	Jun 1843 – Jun 1848
George Oakes	Jul 1848 – Feb 1856

George Oakes went on to be one of two representatives for Parramatta in the new Legislative Assembly in 1856.

== Election results ==
=== 1843 ===
1843 New South Wales colonial election, 16 June: Town of Parramatta
Candidate	Votes	%
Hannibal Macarthur	unopposed	

=== 1848 ===
1848 New South Wales colonial election, 28 July: Town of Parramatta
Candidate	Votes	%
George Oakes (elected)	101	53
William Macarthur	89	47
Total votes	190	100

=== 1851 ===
1851 New South Wales colonial election, 20 September: Town of Parramatta
Candidate	Votes	%
George Oakes	120	72.31
Alfred Kennerley	10	7.69
Total votes	130	100.00

== See also ==
- Members of the New South Wales Legislative Council, 1843–1851 and 1851-1856
