= James Bligh =

Australian politician

James William Bligh (1810 – 1 December 1869) was an English-born Australian politician.

== Biography ==
James was born at Bodmin in Cornwall to conveyancer John Martyn Bligh and Mary Edyreun Hocking. He was a solicitor and migrated to South Australia in 1839. He moved to Sydney and practiced as a solicitor from 1841. He ceased practising due to ill health in the early 1850s. From 1851 to 1856 Bligh was an elected member of the New South Wales Legislative Council. He served in the reconstituted Council from 1856 to 1859 and was the first chairman of Willoughby Council from 1865 to 1867. Bligh died at Woolloomooloo in 1869.

New South Wales Legislative Council
Preceded by John Darvall	Member for County of Bathurst; Sep 1851 – Feb 1856	Council replaced by new parliament
Civic offices
New title	Chairman of Willoughby Municipal Council; 1866 – 1867	Succeeded by Himself as Mayor
Preceded by Himself as Chairman	Mayor of Willoughby; 1867 – 1868	Succeeded by David Broadfoot
