= Stuart Donaldson =

New South Wales politician and Premier (1812-1867)

The Honourable Sir Stuart Donaldson
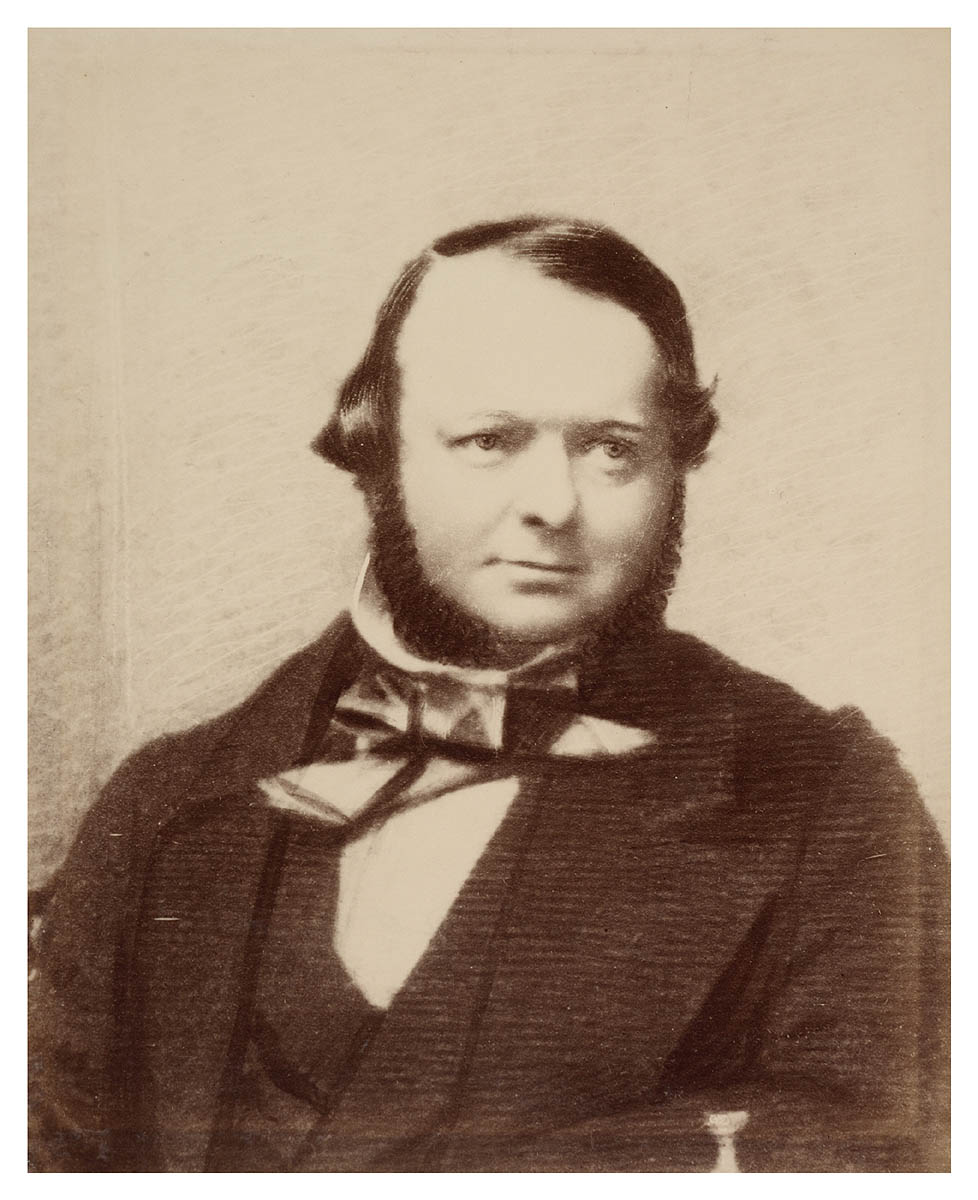

1st Premier of New South Wales
- In office 6 June 1856 – 25 August 1856
- Monarch: Victoria
- Governor: Sir William Denison
- Preceded by: Office established
- Succeeded by: Charles Cowper

5th Colonial Treasurer of New South Wales
- In office 3 October 1856 – 7 September 1857
- Preceded by: Robert Campbell
- Succeeded by: Richard Jones

Personal details
- Born: Stuart Alexander Donaldson; 16 December 1812 London, England, UK
- Died: 11 January 1867 (aged 54) Carleton Hall, Cumberland, England, UK
- Spouse: Amelia Cowper (1854–1867)
- Children: Hay Frederick Donaldson; St Clair Donaldson
- Profession: Business agent for Richard Jones & Co, Company manager for Lloyd's of London; sheep and cattle grazier

Sir Stuart Alexander Donaldson (16 December 1812 – 11 January 1867) was the first Premier of the Colony of New South Wales.

== Early life ==
Donaldson was born in London, England. He entered his father's firm at the age of 15 and was sent first to Mexico (1831–1834), for business training. After returning to England in May 1834, Donaldson travelled to Sydney, New South Wales, aboard the Emma Eugenia where he arrived on 5 May 1835. He returned to London between 1841 and 1844.

== Career ==
In 1848, Donaldson was elected a member of the original unicameral Legislative Council of New South Wales, representing the County of Durham from February 1848 to January 1853. Comments made while running for re-election in 1851, led Sir Thomas Mitchell to demand a public apology. While Donaldson complied Mitchell was not satisfied and challenged Donaldson to a duel with pistols. Both men missed but they remained antagonised. He supported the development of steam ship services to Australia and the work of Caroline Chisholm. In 1852 he achieved the carriage of a motion recommending that £10,000 should be applied to supporting Chisholm's work. He travelled to England in 1853–1854. On 21 February 1854, he married Amelia Cowper.

They sailed for Australia aboard the Calcutta in August 1854. Fellow cabin passengers included William Westgarth and Rachel Henning. Henning described the Donaldsons as follows,

Mr and Mrs Donaldson are in their own eyes the great people on board, he being actually a member of the Australian Parliament (I did not know they had one). He is very stout, very bumptious and a great eater. She is handsome and affected and has not been married very long. She has been dreadfully seasick and today, for the first time, appeared at breakfast.

From 1 February 1855 to 29 February 1856, Donaldson represented Sydney Hamlets in the council. In March 1856, Donaldson was elected to the newly created Legislative Assembly of the first Parliament, representing Sydney Hamlets. The first Legislative Assembly had trouble forming a Government. Eventually Governor Denison invited Donaldson to be Premier and he took up the offices of Premier and Colonial Secretary on 6 June 1856. Two months and 20 days later, on 25 August 1856, his Government lost a vote and he resigned. He was criticised for standing down so readily but he said, "my colleagues and myself are all too independent of office to cling to it", a somewhat prophetic remark.

Donaldson was succeeded as Premier by Charles Cowper and Donaldson served as Colonial Treasurer (1856–1857) and was a Commissioner for Railways in 1857. He was elected unopposed to Cumberland (South Riding) in October 1856, representing it to 1859. He was a member of the Senate of the University of Sydney from 1851 to 1861 and his brother John helped to select its academic staff.

== Late life ==
Donaldson returned to England for the last time in June 1859 and was knighted there in 1860. Following his return, he unsuccessfully sought election to the British House of Commons for Dartmouth in 1860 and later for Barnstaple. He had four sons, including Stuart Alexander Donaldson, St Clair Donaldson, and Hay Frederick Donaldson, and one daughter.

Stuart Donaldson died at Carleton Hall, near Penrith in Cumberland, England on 11 January 1867.

== See also ==
- Tenterfield, New South Wales
- Donaldson ministry

Political offices
New office	Premier of New South Wales; 6 June – 25 August 1856	Succeeded by Charles Cowper
Preceded by Edward Deas Thomson	Colonial Secretary; 6 June – 25 August 1856	Succeeded by Charles Cowper
Preceded by Robert Campbell	Colonial Treasurer; 3 October 1856 – 7 September 1857	Succeeded by Richard Jones
New South Wales Legislative Council
Preceded by Richard Windeyer	Member for County of Durham; Feb 1848 – Jan 1853; With: none / Charles Cowper	Succeeded by Alexander Park
Preceded by Thomas Smart	Member for Sydney Hamlets; Feb 1855 – Feb 1856	Council replaced with new parliament
New South Wales Legislative Assembly
New assembly	Member for Sydney Hamlets; Mar – Oct 1856; With: Daniel Cooper	Succeeded by John Campbell
Preceded by Ryan Brenan	Member for Cumberland (South Riding); Oct 1856 – 1859	District abolished
