= Electoral district of County of Cumberland =

Former New South Wales Legislative Council electoral district

County of Cumberland New South Wales—Legislative Council
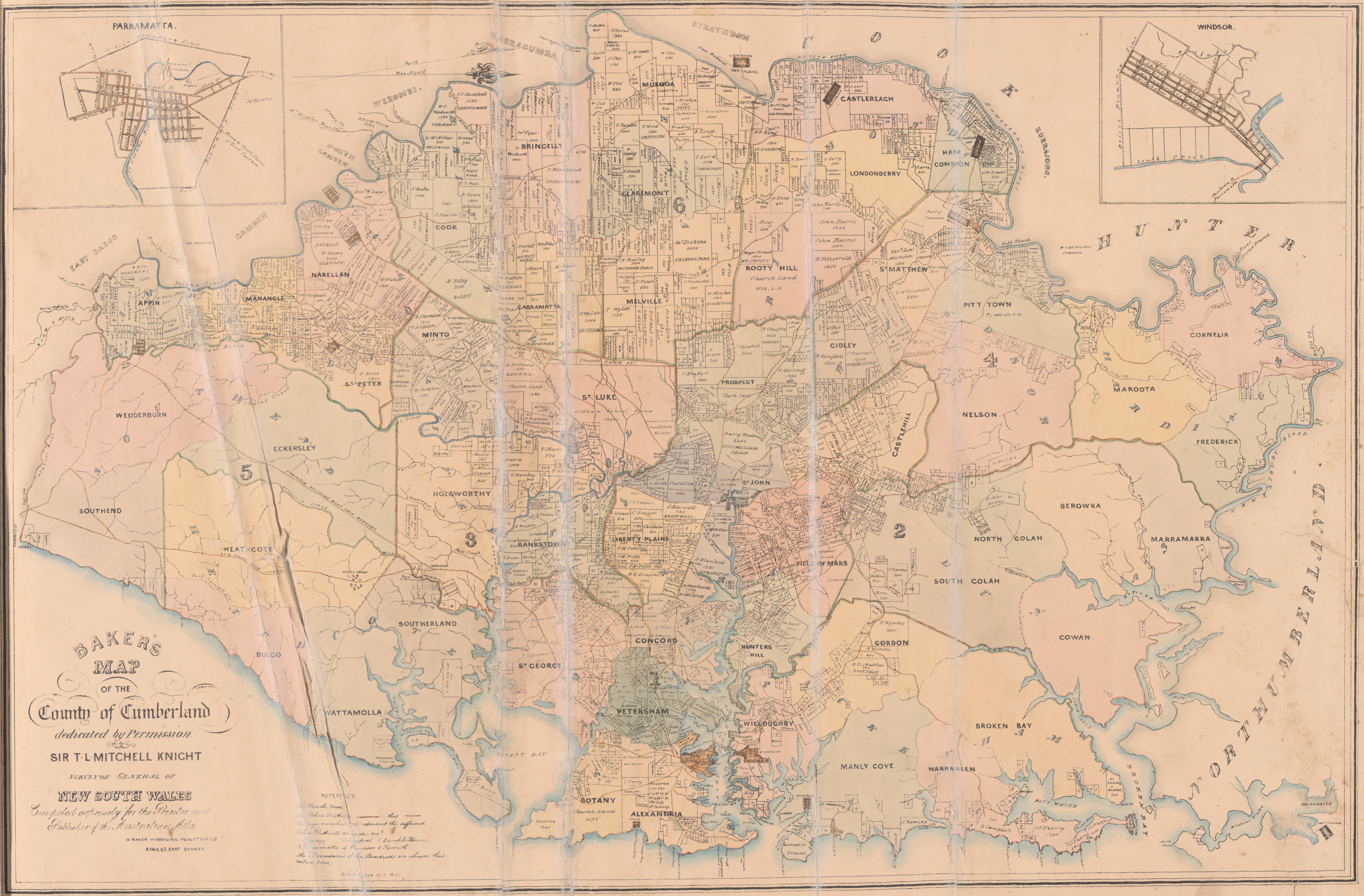
- County of Cumberland in the 1840s
- State: New South Wales
- Created: 1843
- Abolished: 1856
- Namesake: Cumberland County
- Coordinates: 33°50′S 150°30′E

The Electoral district of County of Cumberland was an electorate of the New South Wales Legislative Council at a time when some of its members were elected and the balance were appointed by the Governor.

It was created by the 1843 Electoral Districts Act and returned two members. In 1856 the unicameral Legislative Council was abolished and replaced with an elected Legislative Assembly and an appointed Legislative Council. The district was represented by the Legislative Assembly electorates of Cumberland (South Riding) and Cumberland (North Riding).

== Members ==
Member 1	Term	Member 2	Term
Charles Cowper	Jul 1843 – Feb 1850	William Lawson	Jul 1843 – Jun 1848
Charles Cowper	Jul 1843 – Feb 1850	Nelson Lawson	Aug 1848 – Feb 1849
James Byrnes	Mar 1850 – Jun 1851	Robert Fitzgerald	Mar 1849 – Feb 1856
John Darvall	Sep 1851 – Feb 1856	Robert Fitzgerald	Mar 1849 – Feb 1856

== Election results ==
=== 1843 ===
Two members to be elected

1843 New South Wales colonial election, 3 July: County of Cumberland
Candidate	Votes	%
Charles Cowper	504	29.18
William Lawson	383	22.18
James Macarthur	372	21.54
Bob Nichols	334	19.34
Ryan Brenan	134	7.76
Total votes	1,727	100.00

=== 1848 ===
1848 New South Wales colonial election, 2 August: County of Cumberland
Candidate	Votes	%
Charles Cowper (elected 1)	637	38
Nelson Lawson (elected 2)	556	33
Henry Gilbert Smith	490	29
Total votes	1,683	100

=== 1849 ===
Nelson Lawson died in February 1849.

County of Cumberland by-election 28 March 1849
Candidate	Votes	%
Robert Fitzgerald	544	73.31
Archibald Michie	287	21.69
Total votes	438	100.00

=== 1850 ===
Charles Cowper resigned in February 1850.

County of Cumberland by-election 13 March 1850
Candidate	Votes	%
James Byrnes	343	73.31
Henry Douglass	95	21.69
Total votes	438	100.00

=== 1851 ===
1851 New South Wales colonial election, 22 September: County of Cumberland
Candidate	Votes	%
John Darvall	306	27.39
Robert Fitzgerald	297	26.59
Charles Cowper	295	26.41
James Byrnes	219	19.61
Total votes	1,117	100.00

== See also ==
- Members of the New South Wales Legislative Council, 1843–1851 and 1851-1856
