= George Macleay =

Australian politician

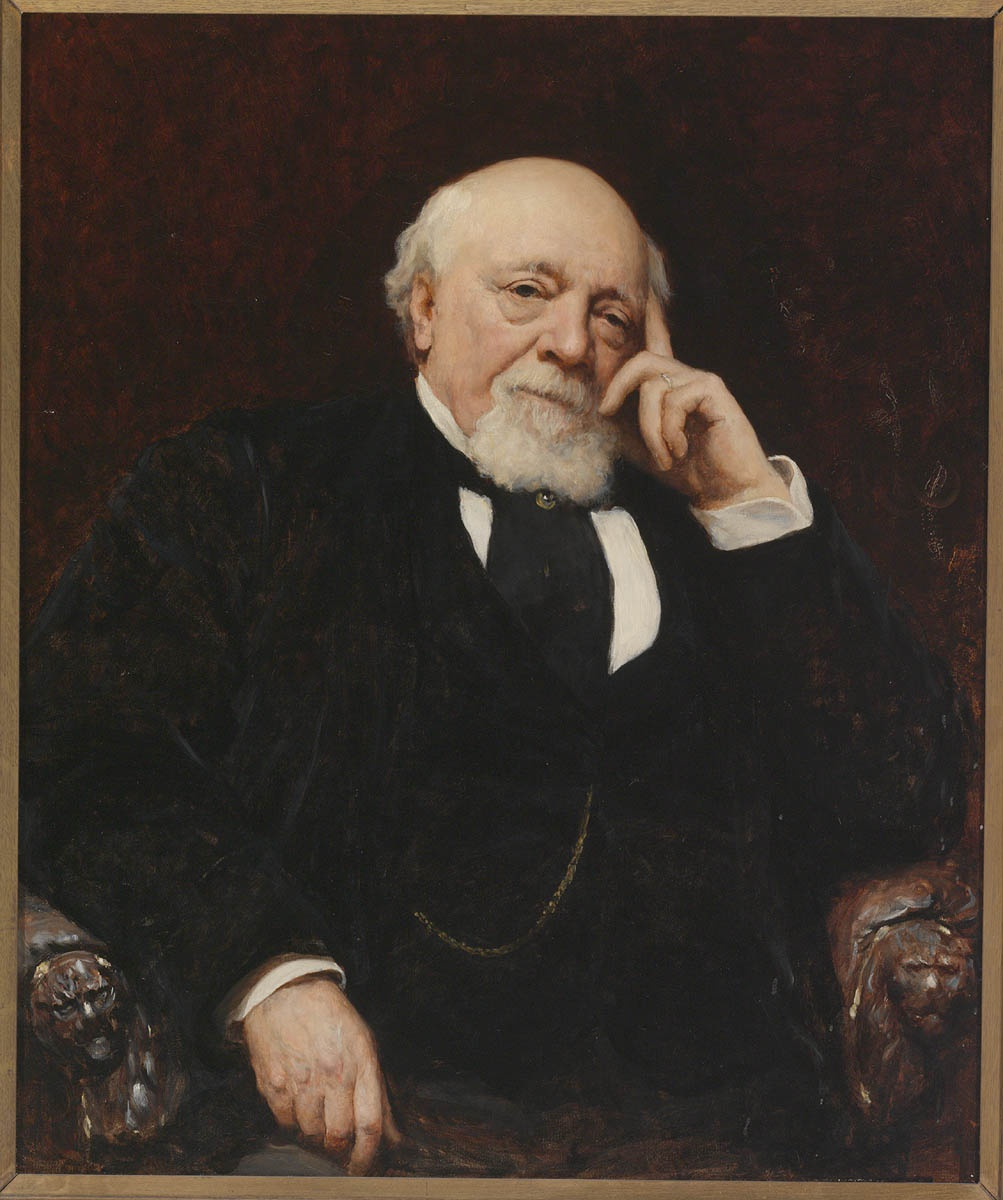
The Hon. Sir George Macleay, KCMG. MLC

Sir George Macleay KCMG MLC (1809 – 24 June 1891) was an Australian explorer and politician.

== Biography ==
Macleay was born in London, the third son of Alexander Macleay and educated at Westminster School. He came to Australia in 1826.

In November 1829, he accompanied Charles Sturt on his second expedition to the mouth of the Murray River and back. Early in April 1830, after difficulties on the expedition and the whole party was practically exhausted, Sturt recorded that "amidst these distresses Macleay preserved his good humour and did his utmost to lighten the toil and to cheer the men". Macleay and Sturt remained good friends and corresponded regularly until Sturt's death in 1869.

Macleay then lived on and farmed the Brownlow estate, near Camden, and also established a property at Fish River, between Goulburn and Yass from 1831 to 1859.

In 1854, Macleay was elected to the New South Wales Legislative Council for the Pastoral District of Murrumbidgee. In 1856 the unicameral Legislative Council was abolished and replaced with an elected Legislative Assembly and an appointed Legislative Council and Macleay was elected to the Legislative Assembly for Murrumbidgee. He was a conservative. He declined a ministry position in Henry Parker's brief premiership in 1857.

In 1859, Macleay returned to England, where he was elected a fellow of the Linnean Society in 1860. He spent the remainder of his life in the south of France apart from returning briefly to Sydney in 1873 to finalise his affairs there. He also travelled in his steam yacht to the Greek islands, Turkey and Syria.

Macleay was also a keen zoologist, he donated fossil specimens he collected from the Murrumbidgee River to the Australian Museum. He was also a museum trustee and contributed to Richard Owen's book on the fossils of Australia. On his 1873 visit, he collected a Queensland lungfish or Ceratodus forsteri (now called Neoceratodus forsteri) and took it back to London for T. H. Huxley to dissect and describe in an 1876 paper which identified the supplier as "my friend Sir George Macleay ... on a recent visit to Australia".

Charles Sturt named the Rufus River in south-western New South Wales in Macleay's honour, as he had red hair, and Point McLeay was (mis-)named for him by T. B. Strangways and Hutchinson in 1837.

Macleay was appointed a Companion of the Order of St Michael and St George (CMG) in 1869 and knighted KCMG in 1875. He died at Menton, France, on 24 June 1891.

New South Wales Legislative Council
New district	Member for Murrumbidgee; 1851 – 1855	Council replaced
New South Wales Legislative Assembly
Preceded by New seat	Member for Murrumbidgee; 1856 – 1859; Served alongside: Hay	Succeeded by William Macleay
