= William Harvie Christie =

British civil servant and colonial politician in New South Wales, Australia

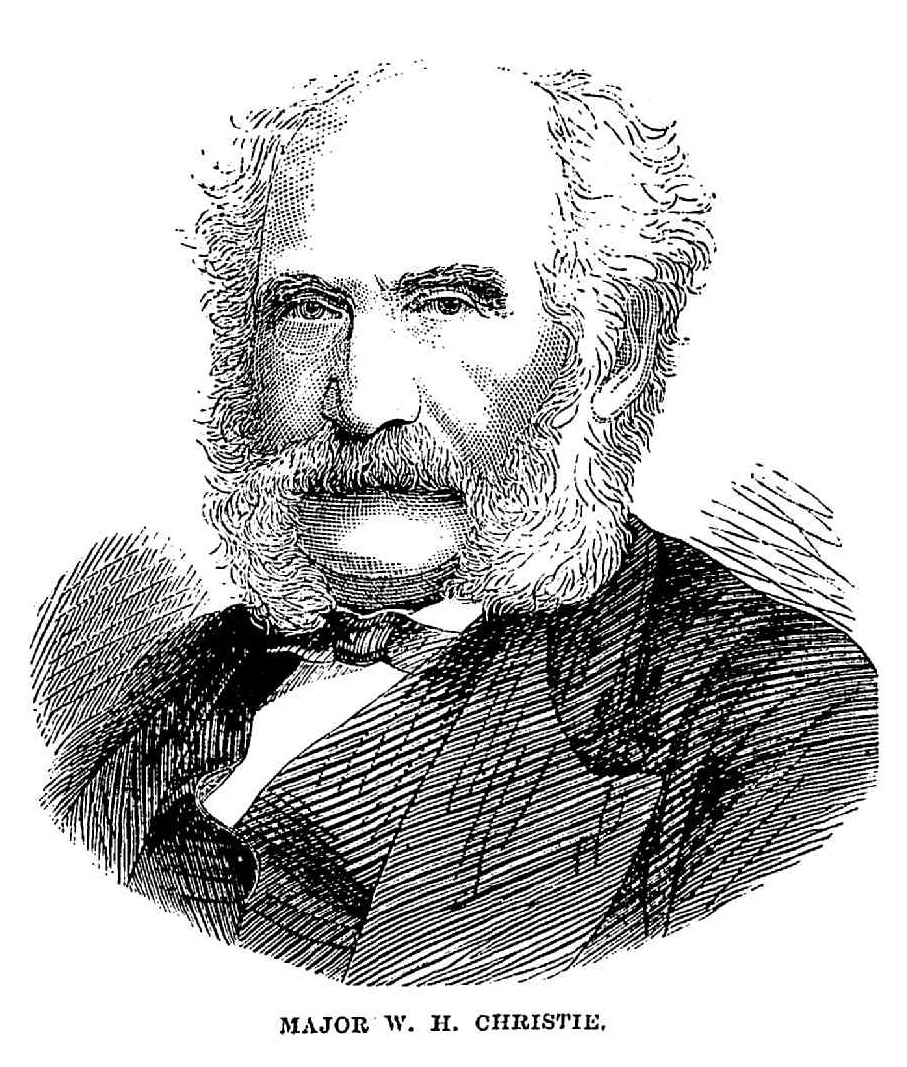

Personal details
- Born: c. 1808 Ceylon
- Died: 19 March 1873 (aged 64–65) Pyrmont, New South Wales, Australia

William Harvie Christie (1808 – 19 March 1873) was an Australian senior public servant.

Christie was born in Ceylon and arrived in Australia in 1836 as a captain in the British Army. He was appointed superintendent of convict gangs based at Liverpool. He was promoted to major in 1838 and a year later appointed as superintendent of the convict gangs housed at Hyde Park Barracks in Sydney. Christie retired from the army and in January 1847 was appointed as Sergeant-at-Arms to the New South Wales Legislative Council. He served as Postmaster-General of New South Wales from May 1852 to September 1865.

== Biography ==
=== Early years ===
William Harvie Christie was born in 1808 in Ceylon, the third of seven sons of Thomas Christie and his wife Mary (née Tolfrey). His father was the medical inspector-general of Ceylon. The Christie family returned to England in about 1810 and settled at Cheltenham, county Gloucestershire. Six of the seven sons in the family (including William) joined the British Army.

Young William was educated at the Rugby School and later at the Royal Military Academy at Woolwich, where he qualified for the artillery (but afterwards opted for the infantry).

=== Military service ===
William Christie undertook military officer training at the Sandhurst Royal Military Academy and joined the 80th Regiment of Foot as an ensign. He was promoted to lieutenant in March 1827 and captain in May 1833. Christie "served for many years in Ireland".

Captain William H. Christie and Ellen Harrison were married on 28 July 1835 in Manchester Cathedral. The couple had four children, born in Australia between about 1837 and 1846.^{[A]}

Captain Christie and his wife arrived at Sydney in the colony of New South Wales in November 1836 aboard the Captain Cook. The vessel, which departed from Cork in Ireland in early July, transported 228 male convicts, with Christie in charge of the guard during the voyage.

In July 1837 Captain Christie was appointed to the positions of "Assistant Engineer and Superintendent of the Liverpool Stockades". In August 1838 the Liverpool town committee passed a resolution at a meeting expressing the "high opinion" of Captain Christie, in charge of convict gangs at the settlement. The resolution commended Christie's "diligence and activity in the control of the gangs under his charge, as well as the general interest he has uniformly manifested in carrying on the improvements connected with the Town and Public Works in the neighbourhood of Liverpool".^{[B]}

Christie was promoted to the rank of major in November 1838. Convicts from the Liverpool Stockade under the command of Major Christie constructed a water supply reservoir and cattle tank at Campbelltown, completed in mid-1839. Improvements made to Liverpool township and surrounding district under convict gangs under Christie's command included the road approaches to the town, street drainage and completion of a weir over the Georges River which secured "an abundant and never-failing supply of fresh water" to the community. In October 1839 "a deputation from the magistrates and gentry of Liverpool and its neighbourhood" waited on Major Christie and presented him "with an address and a handsome piece of plate on his departure from the district, and retirement from the army".

=== Public service ===
In November 1839 Major Christie was appointed as superintendent of the convict gangs housed at Hyde Park Barracks in Sydney, replacing Captain J. Long Innes (who had taken up an appointment as superintendent of the Sydney police). Christie was also made a magistrate of the colony of New South Wales, to act as an assistant to the Sydney Police Magistrate (but only attending the Bench when needed or being otherwise unoccupied). His roles were described as "Superintendent of Iron Gangs and assistant magistrate for the town of Sydney". By that stage Christie had retired from the army and his role was described as a "semi-military and semi-civil" position.

In 1840 Christie was made visiting magistrate of Carter's Barracks at the corner of Pitt Street and Belmore Road, a house of correction for prisoners outside the jurisdiction of the Convict Department (later used as a debtors' prison). In December 1840 Christie was a signatory to a memorial to the Governor from "Landholders, Merchants, and other Employers of Labour in New South Wales", calling for the introduction of "hill coolies" from India into the colony as a remedy for a perceived "deficiency of labour". The proposal was ultimately rejected by the Colonial Office.^{[C]}

In January 1841 Christie was appointed as a member of the Immigration Board. As part of his duties he visited immigation ships "for the purpose of examining the bounty immigrants".

Major Christie was a member of the Australian Club and he was appointed steward of the club for 1841. The position was newly created to address "some little mismanagement" in the administration of the club.

At a general meeting of the Australian Club on 11 March 1841 an election for the combined office of secretary and treasurer was held, at which Christie was elected, defeating Colonel Henry Croasdaile Wilson for the position. Since 1833 Wilson had held the position of Police Magistrate of Sydney in charge of the city's police, but he had been removed from office in July 1840 after charges of misconduct were made against him. After the election a series of anonymous articles began to appear (beginning on 24 March), published in the Free Press newspaper, making disparaging comments about the Australian Club's committee and secretary-treasurer and alleging mismanagement of the club's affairs. One of the articles, published on 5 May, ended with the Latin phrase "Cornua Cristæ" which Christie interpreted as a negative reflection upon his wife's honour ("an indelible stain upon the character of a beloved wife"). On the evening of the day the article was published, an agitated Christie encountered Wilson dining at the Australian Club. He immediately challenged Wilson, accusing him of being the author of the article and describing his wife as being "as pure and virtuous a creature as ever breathed". Christie then called Wilson "a dastardly villain" and struck him twice on the head with a riding whip. Wilson took action in the Supreme Court to recover the sum of one thousand pounds for damages for the assault by Christie. The case was heard on 10 June 1841 before Justice Stephen. In court Wilson admitted writing the article, but denied making any reference to Mrs. Christie. The jury delivered a verdict awarding £150 damages to Wilson. On 16 June a special general meeting of Australian Club members resolved that Colonel Wilson "has ceased to be a member" of the club.

In 1841 Christie completed a novel titled A Love Story, published anonymously ("by a Bushman") in two volumes by George W. Evans of George Street, Sydney, and printed in the offices of The Sydney Herald. The novel was dedicated to Lady Gipps, the wife of the governor of New South Wales. Christie was a devout churchman and his writing gave expression to his strong Christian beliefs.

In June 1842 Governor Gipps appointed Christie as the Agent of the Church and School Estates, replacing Oswald Bloxsome. Christie worked from an office at 2 Wentworth Place, Point Piper.

In January 1847 Christie was appointed as Sergeant-at-Arms to the New South Wales Legislative Council, replacing John Stirling. During this period he served as a member of the Denominational School Board. In 1851 Major Christie served as a member of a board of enquiry, appointed "to enquire into the management of the General Post Office". The report, published in October 1851, was critical of the management of the Post Office department, finding that "the business is conducted in a loose and irregular manner" and there was "an absence of efficient control on the part of the Postmaster General".

=== Postmaster-General ===
On 1 May 1852 Christie was appointed to the position of Postmaster-General on an annual salary of one thousand pounds (replacing Francis Merewether in the role). On 14 May 1852 Christie was appointed as a non-elective member of the Legislative Council, a position he held until 29 February 1956.

Major Christie's wife Ellen returned to England for the education of the couple's eldest son at the Sandhurst Military Academy. She died in England in October 1853 and was buried at Alton in Hampshire.

In 1858 Christie was examined by a select committee of the Legislative Assembly investigating ways to reduce public expenditure in government departments. During the questioning members of the committee considered the possible introduction of a postal money order service to prevent money going astray in the mail, pointing out that the system had already been introduced in Victoria. Christie expressed doubts about the system, claiming that he had "always felt that in this Colony the utility of these money orders would be more than counterbalanced by the expense" and was of the opinion that the system was unworkable in communities without bank branches.

In 1862 the New South Wales government resolved to bring a postal money order system into operation, as a part of the colonial Treasury. The new department was to be headed by Robert Allen Hunt, who held a senior position in the General Post Office and had long advocated the establishment of a money order system. An editorial in The Empire newspaper questioned how Hunt's departure might affect the Post Office: "He seems to have been the only check to the little plots and contrivances of the clique with which the Postmaster-General had associated himself, and his absence will give full play to that petty tyranny which has already been brought to bear upon those officers of the establishment who had made themselves obnoxious by speaking too freely before Boards of Inquiry, for the benefit of the public service". Post office money orders came into effect in December 1862 in New South Wales, with R. A. Hunt appointed as Superintendent of the Money Order Office.

In 1863 Christie advised that it was important that postmasters should reside under the same roof of independent postal offices to facilitate receiving mail which could arrive by coach or train at any hour, day or night. As a result many purpose-built post offices were subsequently constructed as modest two-storey buildings, with postal services on the ground floor and the postmaster’s residence on the upper level.

An August 1865 editorial in The Empire newspaper was critical of Christie's tenure as Postmaster-General, stating that "for years the internal feuds and dissensions of the Post-office have been a common scandal".

In 1865 the position of Postmaster-General was changed by the Cowper ministry from a public service position to a political appointment. In late September 1865 a proclamation by the Governor declared that the person holding the office of Postmaster-General of New South Wales was to be an officer "capable of being elected a Member of the Legislative Assembly'. The member for Hawkesbury, James Cunneen, was selected to succeed Christie in the role, entering on the duties of the office on 1 October 1865. Major Christie retired with an annual pension of eight hundred pounds.

=== Last years ===
Christie's retirement pension, under the Superannuation Act, was considered to be a "handsome allowance", but the fund "notoriously failed" and there were disruptions to his payments.

William Christie suffered from "a long and painful illness" for the last eighteen months of his life. On 19 March 1873 he died suddenly "of heart disease" at his residence 'Craigstone', in Point Street in Pyrmont, aged 65.

== Notes ==
A. William and Ellen Christie had the following children: William, born on 8 November 1837 at Liverpool, New South Wales; Mary Isabella, born in 1839 at Liverpool; Edward G., born in 1841 in Sydney (probably died as an infant); Edward Tolfrey, born on 1 April 1844 at Surry Hills; Ellen Tullock, born on 9 February 1846 at Willoughby.

B. The 'stockade system' was used by colonial governments to house and manage convicts. Stockades were permanent or temporary holding facilities for convict labour gangs, often located near public works projects such as road construction.

C. "Hill coolies" was a British colonial-era term for tribal groups from the hills of eastern India, particularly Jharkhand, who were recruited as indentured laborers for overseas and domestic labour migration, especially after the abolition of slavery in 1834. These individuals, from impoverished and marginalised communities, were seen by colonial powers as a source of cheap labour, though their recruitment often involved exploitation and misrepresentation.

Political offices
Preceded by Francis Merewether	Postmaster-General; 1852 – 1865	Succeeded by James Cunneen
