= Robert Fitzgerald (pastoralist) =

Australian pastoralist and politician

Robert Fitzgerald (1 June 1807 – 9 May 1865) was an Australian politician.

He was born at Windsor to settler Richard Fitzgerald and Mary Ford. He inherited livestock in 1828 and was granted land at Rylstone in 1830. He later acquired further land on the Liverpool Plains in 1832 and at Yarraman in 1835 before inheriting his father's large estate in 1840. In addition he owned tracts of land in Bligh County and around the Gwydir River, as well as significant real estate in Sydney. In 1840 he was director of the Bank of New South Wales. On 11 March 1841 he married Elizabeth Henrietta Rouse, with whom he had six children and they resided at Mamre; a second marriage to Charlotte Bennett on 8 October 1864 was childless. He served on Windsor District Council, and was an elected member of the New South Wales Legislative Council from 1849 to 1856. He was appointed a member of the first reconstituted Council from 1856 to 1861 and a life appointment in the second from 1861 until his death at Darlinghurst in 1865.

New South Wales Legislative Council
Preceded by Charles Cowper & Nelson Lawson	Member for County of Cumberland; Mar 1849 – Feb 1856; With: James Byrnes/John Darvall	Council replaced by new parliament
