= Alexander Longmore =

Australian politician

Alexander Longmore (died 27 October 1851) was an Australian politician. He was a barrister who was appointed to the New South Wales Legislative Council on 13 October 1851, but he died fifteen days later.
