= Electoral district of Counties of Roxburgh, Phillip and Wellington =

Former legislative council electoral district of New South Wales, Australia

Counties of Roxburgh, Phillip and Wellington New South Wales—Legislative Council
- State: New South Wales
- Created: 1843
- Abolished: 1851
- Namesake: Roxburgh County, Phillip County, Wellington County

The Electoral district of Counties of Roxburgh, Phillip and Wellington and from 1851, Roxburgh and Wellington, was an electorate of the partially elected New South Wales Legislative Council, created for the first elections for the Council in 1843. The electoral district included the western counties of Roxburgh, Phillip, Wellington County. Polling took place at Montefiores, Mudgee, Bathurst and Hartley. The County of Phillip was removed from the district with the expansion of the Council in 1851 and became part of the Counties of Phillip, Brisbane and Bligh.

At all four elections, there was only one candidate who was therefore elected unopposed. In 1856 the unicameral Legislative Council was abolished and replaced with an elected Legislative Assembly and an appointed Legislative Council. The district was represented by the Legislative Assembly electorates of Roxburgh and Wellington (County).

== Members ==
District name	Member	Term
Roxburgh, Phillip and Wellington	William Suttor Sr.	Jun 1843 – Jun 1851
Roxburgh and Wellington	William Suttor Sr.	Jul 1851 – Sep 1854
Roxburgh and Wellington	Saul Samuel	Oct 1854 – Feb 1856

== Election results ==
=== 1843 ===
1843 New South Wales colonial election, 26 June: Counties of Roxburgh, Phillip and Wellington
Candidate	Votes	%
William Suttor Sr.	unopposed	

=== 1848 ===
1848 New South Wales colonial election, 31 July: Counties of Roxburgh, Phillip and Wellington
Candidate	Votes	%
William Suttor Sr. (elected)	unopposed	

=== 1851 ===
1851 New South Wales colonial election, 24 September: Counties of Roxburgh and Wellington
Candidate	Votes	%
William Suttor Sr.	unopposed	

=== 1854 ===
1854 Counties of Roxburgh and Wellington by-election Monday 16 October
Candidate	Votes	%
Saul Samuel	unopposed	

== See also ==
- Members of the New South Wales Legislative Council, 1843–1851 and 1851-1856
