= William Thurlow =

Australian politician

William Edward Thurlow (1815−15 January 1873) was a politician and solicitor in colonial New South Wales.

Thurlow was born in around 1815 and emigrated to Sydney aged 9–10 years with his father, also called William Thurlow, and two of his brothers, arriving on 3 August 1825. The journey from London on board the William Shand had taken 144 days, via St Jago and Hobart. On 3 May 1837 he married Anne Jane James. He was admitted as a solicitor in September 1837, having worked for William Wentworth and completed his articles with Charles Henry Chambers.

He was elected a member of Sydney City Council on 7 October 1843 for the Bourke Ward, a position he would hold until October 1853 when the council was abolished due to incompetence and corruption. He was elected as Mayor on 21 January 1851 serving until his resignation in December 1852. He was elected to a further term as a councilor from 1 December 1857, serving until 30 November 1859.

In March 1853 was the successful candidate at the by-election for a City of Sydney seat in the New South Wales Legislative Council, with 1,249 votes (69.4%) defeating the young radical Henry Parkes. He served for less than two years, resigning in January 1855.

Thurlow died at Cundletown on 15 January 1873, aged 58 years.

New South Wales Legislative Council
Preceded by John Lamb	Member for City of Sydney; Mar 1853 – Jan 1855; With: William Wentworth / Henry Parkes; Robert Campbell	Succeeded by James Robert Wilshire
Civic offices
Preceded by George Hill	Mayor of Sydney; 1851–1852	Succeeded by Daniel Egan
