= Electoral district of County of Bathurst =

Former legislative council electoral district of New South Wales, Australia

County of Bathurst New South Wales—Legislative Council
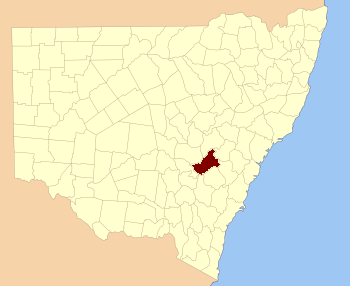
- Location in modern New South Wales
- State: New South Wales
- Created: 1843
- Abolished: 1856
- Namesake: Bathurst County
- Coordinates: 33°30′S 149°30′E

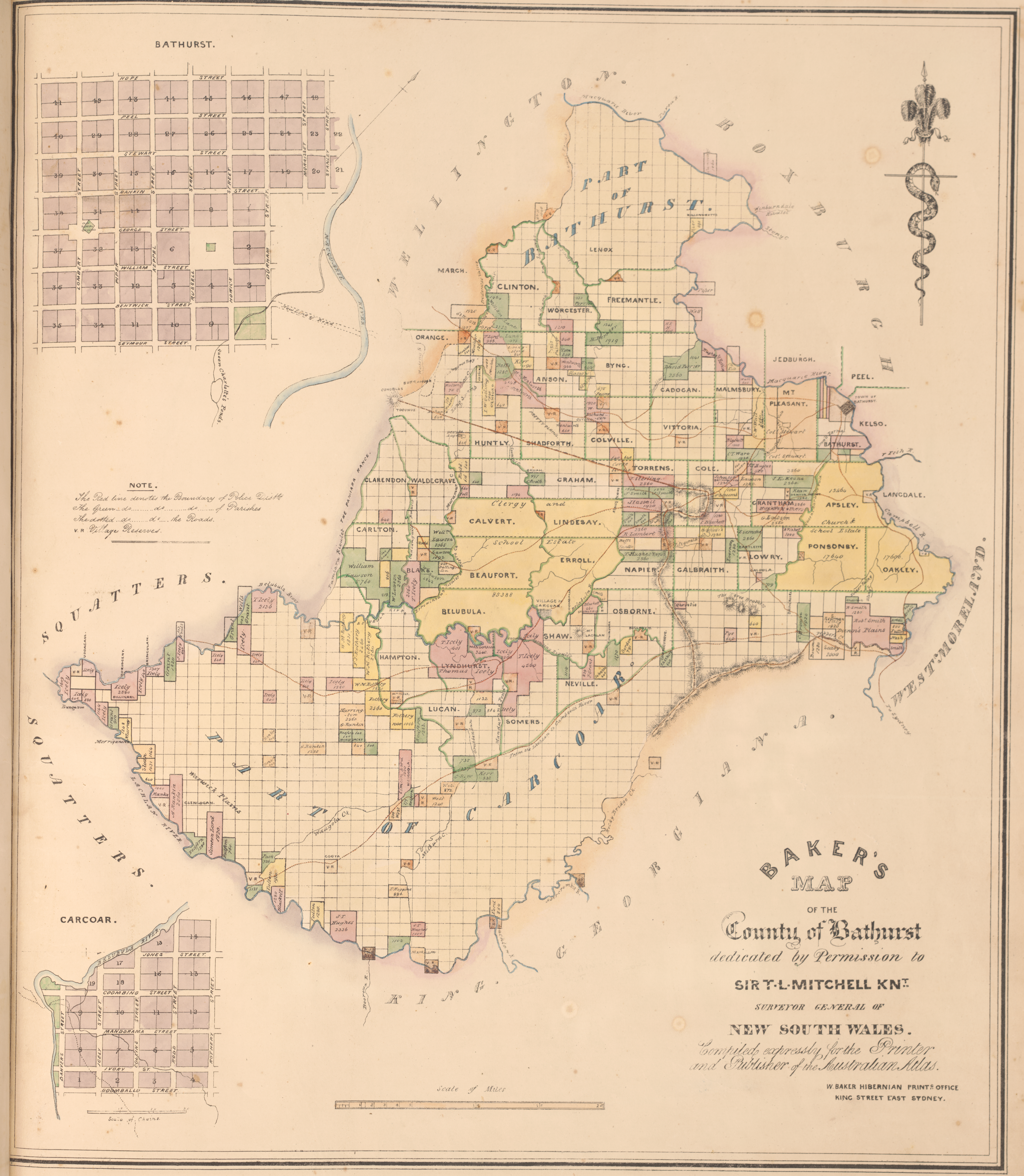
Bathurst county in the 1840s

The Electoral district of County of Bathurst was an electorate of the New South Wales Legislative Council at a time when some of its members were elected and the balance were appointed by the Governor.

It was created by the 1843 Electoral Districts Act and returned one member. The towns of Bathurst, Kelso and Carcoar were removed from the district with the expansion of the Council in 1851 and became the district of Western Boroughs.

In 1856 the unicameral Legislative Council was abolished and replaced with an elected Legislative Assembly and an appointed Legislative Council. The district was represented by the Legislative Assembly electorate of Bathurst.

== Members ==
Member	Term
Francis Lord	1 Jun 1843 – 20 Jun 1848
John Darvall	1 Jul 1848 – 30 Jun 1851
James William Bligh	19 Sep 1851 – 29 Feb 1856

== Election results ==
=== 1843 ===
1843 New South Wales colonial election, 19 June: County of Bathurst
Candidate	Votes	%
Francis Lord	66	60.00
W Lane	44	40.00
Total votes	110	100.00

=== 1848 ===
1848 New South Wales colonial election, 29 July: County of Bathurst
Candidate	Votes	%
John Darvall (elected)	87	50
Francis Lord	87	50
Total votes	174	100

The returning officer gave his casting vote in favour of John Darvall.

=== 1851 ===
1851 New South Wales colonial election, 19 September: County of Bathurst
Candidate	Votes	%
James Bligh	75	58.59
Francis Lord	53	41.41
Total votes	128	100.00

== See also ==
- Members of the New South Wales Legislative Council, 1843–1851 and 1851-1856
