= SS Koombana =

Ship lost in 1912 off Western Australia

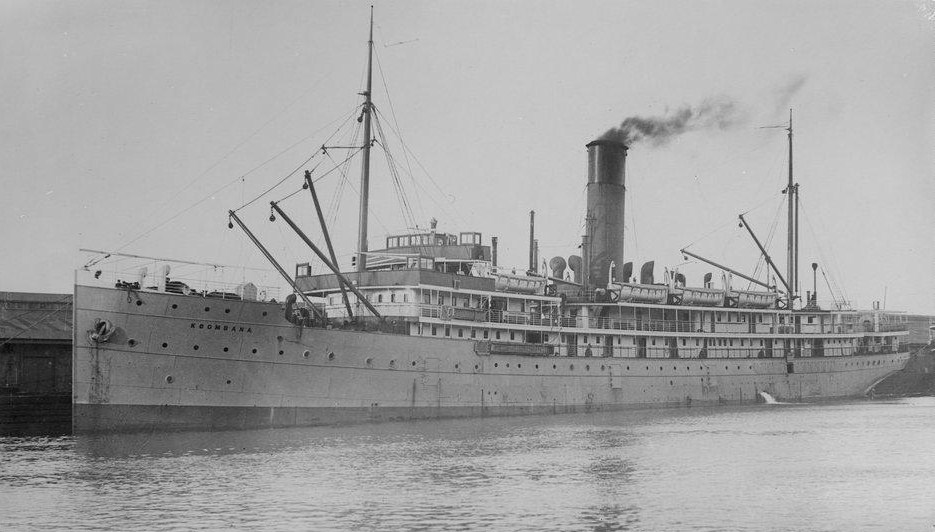
- Koombana in port, about 1910

History

Australia
- Name: Koombana
- Namesake: Koombana, near Bunbury, Western Australia
- Owner: Adelaide Steamship Company
- Port of registry: Port Adelaide
- Builder: Alexander Stephen & Sons, Linthouse, Scotland
- Yard number: 429
- Launched: 27 October 1908
- Identification: UK official number 122725; code letters TQSF
- Fate: Lost with all hands, 20 March 1912

General characteristics
- Type: passenger ship
- Tonnage: 3,668 GRT, 2,182 NRT
- Length: 340.1 ft (103.7 m)
- Beam: 48.2 ft (14.7 m)
- Depth: 20.8 ft (6.3 m)
- Decks: 3
- Installed power: 423 NHP, 3,000 hp
- Propulsion: 1 × screw; 1 × triple expansion engine
- Speed: 14 knots (26 km/h)
- Crew: 74

SS Koombana was a passenger steamship built in Scotland in 1908 for the Adelaide Steamship Company, to operate coastal liner services between Fremantle and the northwest coast of Western Australia. She sank in a tropical cyclone somewhere off Port Hedland in 1912, with the loss of all 150 people aboard. Her loss was one of Australia's worst weather-related maritime disasters in the twentieth century.

Previously, in April and May 1909, Koombana took the Premier of Western Australia, Newton Moore, on a tour of the northwest, which included the official opening of the jetty at Port Hedland, now the highest tonnage port in Australia. Koombana was also the first ship to berth at that jetty.

In November 1910, Koombana was part of a welcoming flotilla of vessels at Broome, Western Australia, for the arrival in Australia of the Royal Australian Navy's first two destroyers, HMAS Parramatta and Yarra. In November 1911, Koombana was the subject of an industrial dispute that had consequences throughout Australia.

Koombana's loss in 1912 caused the Adelaide Steamship Co's to withdraw from serving the northwest coast. This led the Government of Western Australia to found Stateships, which dominated that trade for the rest of the twentieth century.

== Building, registration and identification ==
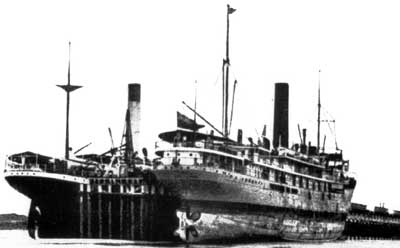
Koombana (right) at low tide, possibly at Broome

Koombana was the first passenger and cargo ship to be designed and built exclusively for the Western Australian coastal service. Her purpose was to develop trade with the northwest of the State. She was built under the British Corporation shelter deck rules, to carry first and second class passengers, many head of cattle, general cargo, and refrigerated cargo.

The Adelaide Steamship Co was the main operator of coastal shipping between Fremantle and the northwest coast when it ordered Koombana. Since 1900 the 1,725 GRT Bullarra had worked the route. Koombana was to be her far larger replacement. She was specially designed for the semi-tropical climate of the northwest coast.

Alexander Stephen & Sons built Koombana at their Linthouse shipyard in Glasgow as yard number 429. She was launched on 27 October 1908 by Mrs S Elgar, wife of one of the Adelaide Steamship Company's superintendents in Britain. Company policy was to give each of its ships a name from a local aboriginal language. At the suggestion of the Premier, Newton Moore, the ship was named Koombana, after Robert Forrest's Koombana Mill, near Bunbury, Western Australia. "Koombana", first recorded by John Arrowsmith in 1838 as "Koombanah", is the Noongar name of a bay near Bunbury, now called Koombana Bay. "Koombana" may mean bay ("ana") of spouting whales ("koomba"), and also "calm and peaceful".

Koombana's registered length was 340.1 ft (103.7 m), her beam was 48.2 ft (14.7 m) and her depth was 20.8 ft (6.3 m). Her tonnages were 3,668 GRT and 2,182 NRT. Babcock & Wilcox supplied her water-tube boilers. She had a single screw, driven by a three-cylinder triple expansion engine, which was rated at 423 NHP or 3,000 hp. She could achieve 14 knots (26 km/h), and her average speed, fully laden, was 13 knots (24 km/h).

The Adelaide Steamship Co registered Koombana at Port Adelaide. Her UK official number was 122725 and her code letters were TQSF.

Koombana was described as "... as luxurious as the Titanic ..." and as "... the last word in seagoing opulence". After her arrival in Fremantle on her delivery voyage, she was praised as "... the acme of perfection as regards the comfort of passengers, facilities for handling cargo, and appliances for skilful navigation ...". However, she was also criticised as "... too good for the trade".

== Architecture and equipment ==
=== Passenger facilities ===
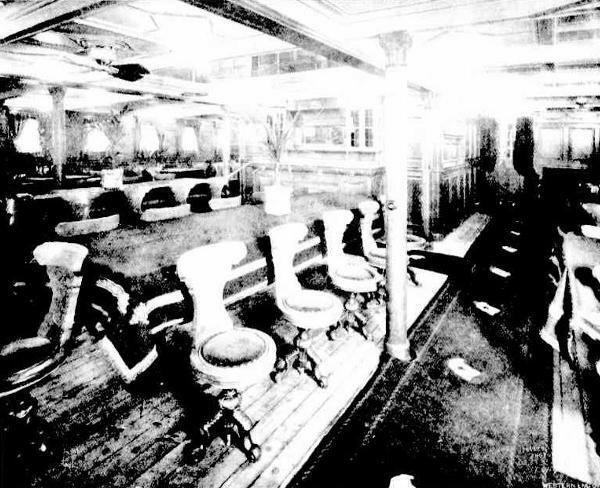
Koombana's first class dining room, c. March 1909

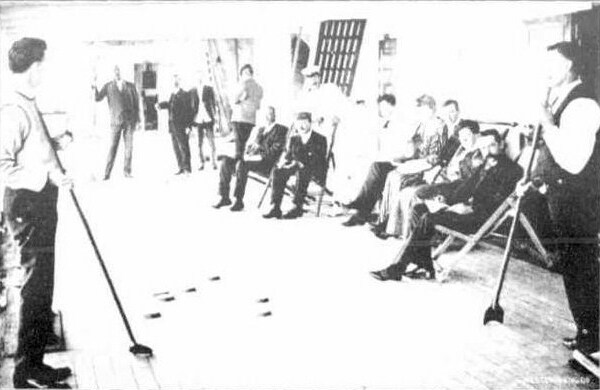
Passengers playing deck billiards (also called shuffleboard) on Koombana, c. April 1909

Koombana had several decks with passenger facilities. Immediately above the lower hold was the orlop deck, and above that, the main deck. Above that was the spar deck, which had most of the passenger cabins and both dining saloons. Over the spar deck was a promenade deck, above which was the bridge and boat deck, with the navigating bridge on top.

The drawing and smoke rooms were both on the promenade deck. In the drawing room, there were portable lounges and Waring & Co furnishings, all upholstered in purple plush. The drawing room had satinwood panelled walls, a bookcase with up-to-date library, and other furniture, including a Broadway piano and a pair of Chippendale-style writing desks. Its ceilings were white painted canvas with a gilt-edged floral design; its main entrance and the stairway leading to the promenade deck were both panelled in mahogany. The smoke room was upholstered in scarlet.

Koombana's dining room in the first saloon was roomy, well ventilated, and had green-upholstered seating for 75 people. Its walls were panelled in oak. The galley and pantries had modern appliances, including a patent electric egg boiler in the kitchen, and an electrically driven dough mixer in the bakehouse.

There were berths for 300 first and second saloon passengers. Most cabins had only two berths, and all had electric fans. The first class cabins were built according to the island system, with each division having a separate entrance from the deck, and easy access to and from the saloon.

=== Equipment ===
Koombana's bridge had various instruments and machines, including the latest navigation aids. There was an Alfred Graham patent telephone switch, which linked the bridge with the captain's cabin, the poop, and the engine-room. The telephone was used in emergencies, or when the officers on the bridge wanted to be more explicit in their instructions to the engine-room. It was supplemented by a telegraph, for communications between the bridge and the aft end of the ship. Also on the bridge were several automatic indicators, a telemotor to control the steering gear, and a portable chart table in a glass.

Koombana had electric navigation lights with auxiliary oil lamps, and indicators to warn of failure of any of the navigational lights. The indicators were in the form of discs in the wheel house. Were anything to go wrong with a light, a coloured flame would flare up in the respective disc. If the indication were disregarded, an electric bell would ring.

Koombana carried a motor launch. It was for use when she missed the tide at northwestern ports, and could be sent ashore as necessary.

=== Cargo facilities ===
Koombana was designed and built to carry livestock. Her main deck had pens for transporting about 220 head of cattle or 1,500 sheep. However, as early as her second northwest coastal run embarked 2,500 sheep at Carnarvon for Fremantle.

Koombana had a refrigerating plant supplied by J&E Hall of London, and two large freezing chambers, with a total capacity of 1,800 tons of cubic space, perishable cargo. These chambers had capacity for about 800 tons of cargo, and were supplemented by an icemaking machine.

Koombana's seven sets of Welin quadrant davits were all worked by hydraulic power, apart from one steam crane at the No 1 hatch forward.

== Service history ==
=== Delivery voyage ===
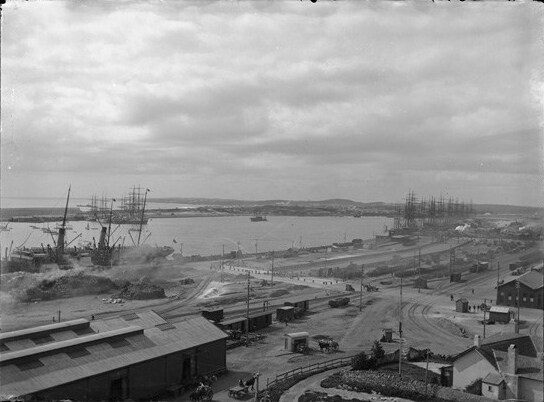
Victoria Quay, Fremantle Harbour and the Swan River from the Signal Station, Fremantle, about 1910.

At the end of December 1908, Koombana left the UK on her delivery voyage to Melbourne, Australia, via Cape Town and Durban in South Africa, and Fremantle and Adelaide in Australia. Her Master for the voyage was Captain John Rees, who had been Master of Bullara.

Koombana left Glasgow on 29 December 1908 in a severe snowstorm. After 36 hours' delay at Greenock awaiting snowbound passengers, she sailed at 7am on 31 December. She passed Las Palmas on 6 January 1909, Cape Verde three days later, and crossed the Equator on 13 January. She reached Cape Town on 23 January, embarked passengers, and left the next day.

On arrival at Durban on 27 January 1909, Koombana embarked many passengers bound for Australian ports, among them one JH Taylor. Two days after the ship left Durban, on 30 January 1909, Mr Taylor vanished without trace. He had been observed to be behaving "in a peculiar and eccentric manner". He had told other passengers that he had been in South Africa for some years, and had lost a lot of money. It was therefore assumed that "his losses had preyed upon his mind", and that "in a fit of melancholia", he had "jumped overboard in the night".

Koombana passed Amsterdam Island on 5 February and reached Fremantle on 11 February. There she unloaded cargo including valuable thoroughbred and Suffolk Punch horses, a Dorset horn ram and five Dorset horn ewes in lamb. A well known former Australian trainer, Edwin Couch, had been engaged to accompany the horses from Glasgow to Fremantle. But after apparently displaying great interest in the matter, he had failed to appear to carry out his engagement, which had therefore had to be carried out by "another good man". Couch had later been discovered to have died by suicide using a revolver in an Exeter hotel.

On 12 February 1909, Koombana left Fremantle for Melbourne. At a reception held on board her in Melbourne on 5 March, the federal Attorney-General, Billy Hughes, responded to a toast to the Commonwealth Parliament by acknowledging the immense proportions that the Australian shipping industry had recently assumed. His Western Australian colleague Senator George Pearce, Minister for Defence, also gave a speech, in which he attributed the moves to establish a Royal Australian Navy to the need to keep the way open for coastal trade. In another speech, the Minister for Home Affairs, Hugh Mahon, who was also the federal Member for Coolgardie in Western Australia, asserted not only that the coastal trade was one of Australia's most precious possessions, but also, somewhat presciently, that no sacrifice should be too great to preserve it.

Soon afterwards, Koombana returned to Fremantle to replace Bullarra on the northwest trade. Shortly before dawn on 8 March 1909, she berthed at Victoria Quay, Fremantle, to complete her delivery. During the delivery voyage, her seagoing qualities had proved to be exceptionally fine.

=== Early northwest trips ===
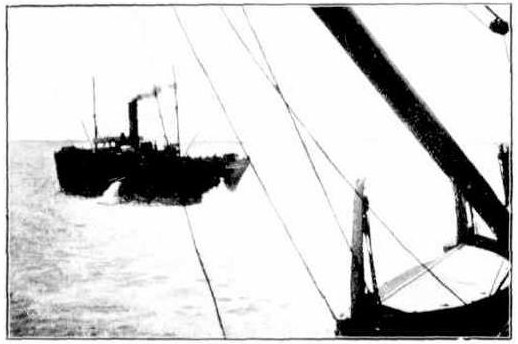
Winfield towing Koombana off the Shark Bay sand bank, 25 March 1909

Koombana left Fremantle on her first northwest trip to Derby on 12 March 1909, and from Geraldton the next night. She was expected to reach Carnarvon on the evening of 15 March 1909, but that morning she ran aground on a sand bank known as Bar Flats, 14 mi (23 km) from Denham in Shark Bay.

A subsequent inquiry by the Chief Harbourmaster, Captain CJ Irvine, established that the master, Captain Rees, had mistaken the mark buoy in the north side of the channel leading to Denham for the outer or westerly buoy. In the hazy prevailing weather, Captain Rees had been unable to verify his position by bearings from the headlands, and there was little warning of the approach of shoal waters. The Chief Harbourmaster therefore concluded that more care should have been exercised when approaching Bar Flats, and the speed of the ship reduced to "slow" until the vessel's position had been definitely ascertained. However, in light of Captain Rees's past good record, and in the absence of any damage to the ship, he recommended that no further action be taken.

Initially, Captain Rees expected to be able to float Koombana off the sand bank the next day. With the haze having lifted by the following morning, the ship became visible from Denham by the aid of glasses. Efforts to refloat her by emptying her ballast tanks were unsuccessful. Crew members then sent the motor launch towards Denham, but in a heavy sea its motor was swamped, and it returned to Koombana using its sail. Denham was reached only on a second attempt.

On 18 March 1909 at 02:30, SS Winfield left Geraldton to lighten her. The task of refloating Koombana took several more days, with the officers and crews of both ships working day and night. On 24 March 1909, Winfield herself ran aground for half an hour, while turning to come alongside. An attempted tow that day was unsuccessful, but at 14:30 the next day, after cargo had been taken out of Koombana's forehatch, she was finally refloated.

Meanwhile, there was disquiet in Carnarvon about the non-arrival of the mail being carried by Koombana. In a telegram to the Postmaster-General in Melbourne, Carnarvon's town clerk complained that the monthly delivery of mail had been delayed by eight days. He pointed out that plenty of boats were available at the scene of the stranding to convey them the 70 mi (110 km) to Carnarvon. Further north, the Port Hedland Advocate called for Shark Bay to be cut off the list of northwest trade calling places, due to its ever-shifting sand banks. However, Koombana was largely forgiven when she arrived in Carnarvon a few days later, even though a quantity of Carnarvon cargo had to be overcarried. Residents and local newspapers marvelled at the comfort of her cabins, while passengers spoke highly of the efforts of the officers and crew to refloat the ship. Koombana then covered the 280 mi (450 km) from Carnarvon to Onslow in the record time of 20½ hours.

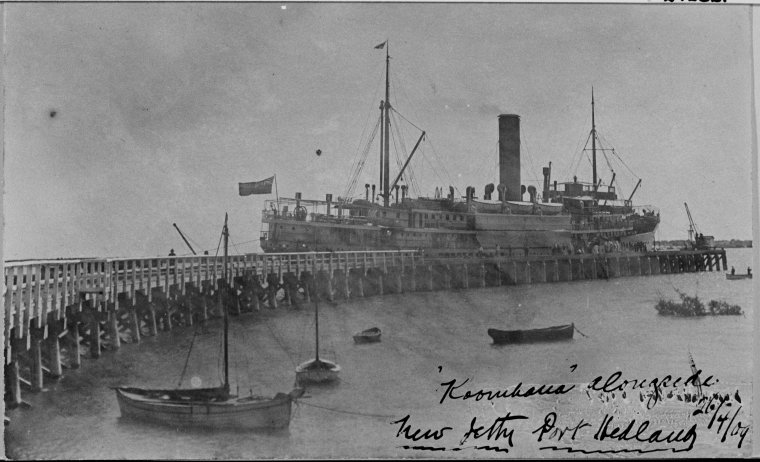
Koombana alongside the new jetty at Port Hedland, 26 April 1909

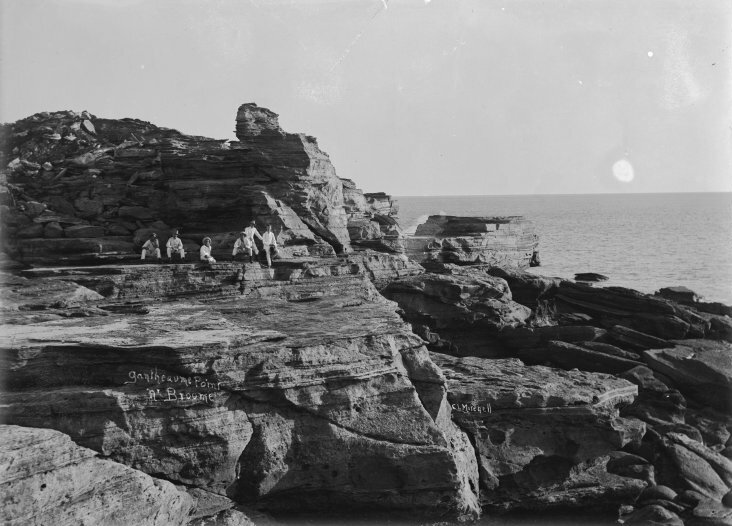
Gantheaume Point, Broome, about 1910

Koombana's second northwest trip left Fremantle on 17 April 1909. In Geraldton on 21 April 1909, the vessel embarked a party comprising the Premier, Newton Moore, the Minister for Works, James Price, and four other State MPs. The party had come from Perth to Geraldton by train, and then continued by Koombana to Derby, before returning by Koombana to Fremantle. Their aim was to visit the northwest ports, inspect recent public works projects, and "... meet the residents of the various ports and ascertain their wants ...". A highlight of the party's tour was the opening on 27 April 1909 of the new Port Hedland jetty, at which Koombana was the first ship to berth. Building the jetty had been expedited to enable the landing of the rails to build the Marble Bar railway line.

Shortly after leaving Broome for Derby on the evening of 28 April 1909, with the ministerial party aboard, Koombana struck an uncharted submerged obstruction about 1 mi (1.6 km) from the Gantheaume light, damaging her bottom on the port side forward. It seems that this incident was not immediately publicised, and that on arrival at Derby the vessel was examined and no damage was found. However, a Court of Marine Inquiry was held. After hearing evidence on 7 August 1909, the Court, consisting of Mr EP Dowley, RM, and Captains Cutler and Foxworthy, observed that an uncharted rock had since been found in the area, and that the course set by Captain Rees, under the guidance of the then available Admiralty chart, was perfectly safe through Roebuck Deep. The Court therefore dismissed a charge of laxity brought against the Captain, exonerated him, and returned his certificate.

Meanwhile, on 12 May 1909, Koombana had left Fremantle on her third northwest trip. By that stage the Broome incident had been made public, but The West Australian announced her impending departure with considerable enthusiasm:

On her recent trip she put up a tremendous performance for consistent fast steaming, and fully justified her claim to be ranked as one of the most speedy vessels on the Australian coastal trade. The demand for berths is still very keen, and on this trip she will take away a full complement of passengers.

However, during the voyage Koombana was found to be making water in one of her tanks. On arrival at Broome, an examination revealed that some of the cement on the bottom of the tank had broken away, and that one of the rivets had broken off, requiring repair.

=== Repairs in Sydney ===
Fremantle lacked a dry dock, so the Adelaide Steamship Co decided sent Koombana to Sydney to be examined and repaired. She steamed there from Fremantle after completing her third northwest trip, stopping only in Albany to land 100 tons of cargo on the way. The Huddart, Parker & Co's liner Burrumbeet stood in for her on the northwest route.

Koombana reached Sydney on the night of 13 June 1909, and entered Mort's Dock the next morning. According to one newspaper report, the Sydney docking revealed that – contrary to earlier reports in Western Australia – the grounding in Shark Bay had broken 13 plates of her hull. "She was evidently kept afloat only by the top skin of her ballast tanks", the report commented. After undergoing repairs, Koombana returned to Fremantle in August 1909, taking up the westward run of Kyarra while she was being overhauled. Burrumbeet then left Fremantle to take up Kyarra's eastward run.

=== Later service ===
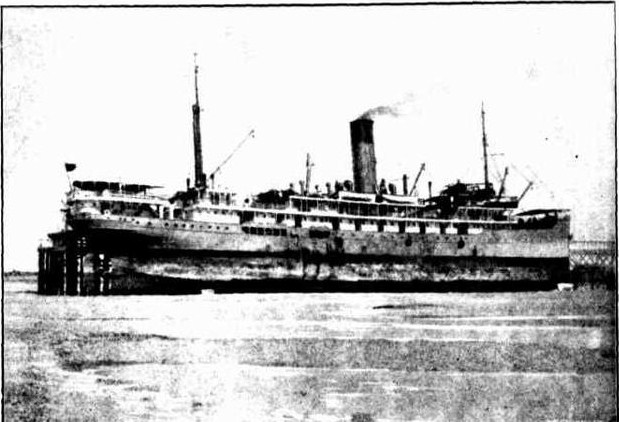
Koombana at Broome, about 1911

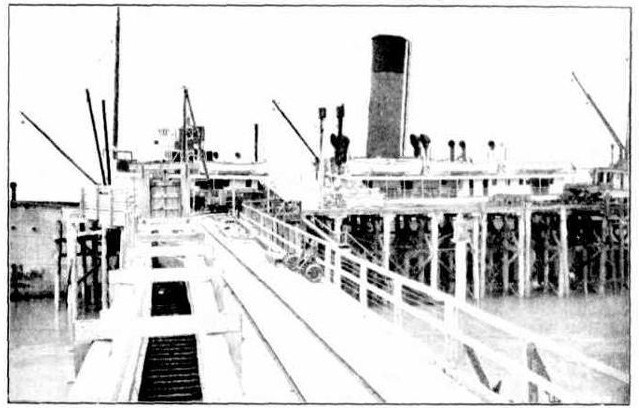
Koombana at the jetty at Derby, about 1911

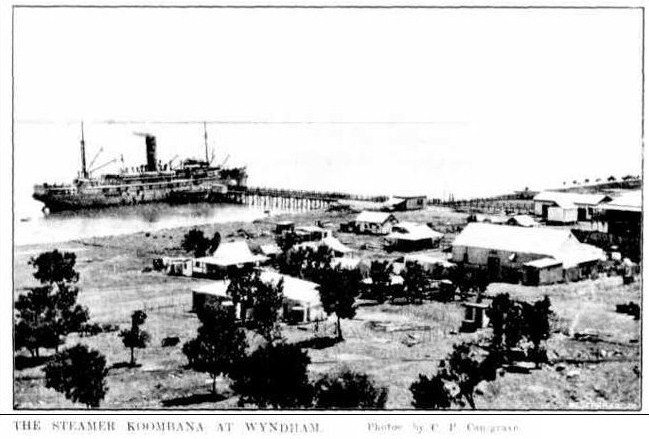
Koombana at Wyndham, about 1911

After Koombana's return from Sydney, she maintained regular monthly trips from Fremantle up the coast, with annual diversions to the eastern states for an overhaul. However, her routine continued to be punctuated by unusual events.

In June 1910, Koombana took another ministerial party on part of a tour of the northwest, when the Colonial Secretary, Mr J D Connolly, travelled aboard her between Fremantle and Port Hedland. On the tour, the Minister inaugurated steam traction on the Cossack – Roebourne tramway, using a steam engine that Koombana had brought there. After leaving Koombana at Port Hedland, the Minister continued his trip to Derby and back to Fremantle aboard the steamship Penguin.

On 26 August 1910 the Adelaide Steamship Co's General Manager in Western Australia, Mr WE Moxon, hosted a luncheon on board Koombana at Fremantle, for members of the Fremantle Chamber of Commerce and the Australasian Steamship Owners' Federation. The luncheon also marked the return from London of the Premier, Sir Newton Moore, and the Collector of Customs. Sir Newton himself was unable to be present, but two other Ministers deputised for him. Toasts proposed included one to King George V, who had recently succeeded to the throne, and another to Koombana. After the luncheon, guests inspected the McIlwraith, McEacharn & Co interstate liner Karoola.

In the early hours of 20 October 1910, on a voyage from Port Hedland to Broome, fire broke out in Koombana's No 1 cargo hold. The hatch was sealed down, and the ship's Clayton Patent fire extinguisher used to put out the fire. Passengers awoke later in the morning to find their cabins full of smoke, and Koombana making full speed for Port Hedland. After her arrival there at noon, parts of the ship remained very hot, and the No 2 hold was also sealed down. The cause of the fire was attributed to a cargo of wet wool that had been loaded at Shark Bay earlier in the trip.

When Koombana reached Fremantle on the afternoon of 27 October 1910, the fire was still smouldering. Water was then pumped into the hold, and by the time hatches were removed, the fire was completely out. The cargo was damaged by fire and water, but no damage was found to the ship.

On her next trip, on 15 November 1910, a visit by Koombana to Broome coincided with the arrival in Australia from the United Kingdom via Singapore of the Royal Australian Navy's first two destroyers, HMAS Parramatta and Yarra, accompanied by the cruiser HMS Gibraltar, and a Dutch steamship with heavy fuel oil to bunker the destroyers. Koombana formed the centrepiece of a welcoming flotilla of vessels, which also included the survey sloop HMS Fantome, and numerous schooners and luggers. Two further days of celebrations then followed.

Koombana grounded in Shark Bay for a second time on the morning of 20 December 1910, as she steamed from Carnarvon to Denham. She struck a sandbank, and was held fast for 12 hours. Dense blue smoke rising from the ship while her crew strove to free her caused alarm in Denham, where observers feared a volcano might be erupting near Dirk Hartog Island. A motor launch was sent to Denham to report the grounding, but Koombana was able to slide off the bank, and catch up with the launch, before it reached its destination.

Late in the evening of 21 January 1911, a second fire broke out aboard Koombana, this time while she was berthed at Victoria Quay, Fremantle. About four or five tons of fodder stored in the Nos 2 and 3 cargo holds were found to be ablaze, apparently by spontaneous combustion. Fremantle Fire Station quickly sent a fire engine, and soon afterwards the Harbour Trust fire plant was requisitioned. Once again the holds were flooded. By 4 am on 22 January 1911, the fire was extinguished, and again the ship seemed undamaged. A smoke helmet sent over by the captain of the German-Australian liner Augsburg did not need to be used, but greatly impressed the fire brigade staff.

On 19 April 1911, Koombana sustained a collision while tied up at Victoria Quay. The Master of another steamship, Pilbarra, became confused by the hoisting of berthing flags. He went astern, to prevent his ship from striking the wharf. Pilbarra then swung around, and struck Koombana's starboard quarter. A Court of Marine Inquiry later found that Pilbarra's Master had made an error of judgment.

On 6 September 1911, Koombana reached Fremantle after her annual overhaul in Sydney. Captain Rees had been transferred to Winfield, and Captain Thomas M Allen became Koombana's Master.

=== Labor dispute ===
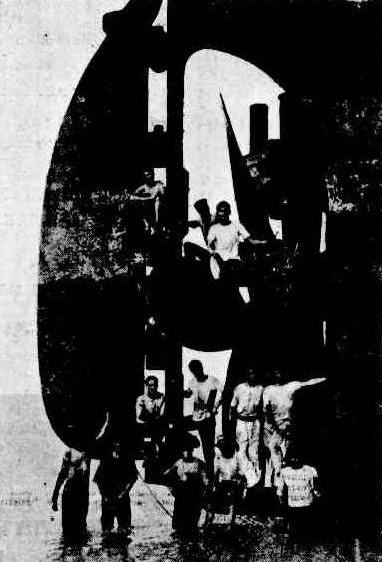
Koombana and crew members at Broome jetty, about 1911

Early in November 1911, as Koombana steamed south from Shark Bay to Geraldton, her chief steward, Frank Johnson, entered the bakehouse. He allegedly abused, and broke a loaf of bread over the head of, the young baker, a German named Edwin Albrecht. After Koombana arrived in Fremantle, Albrecht summoned Johnson to the Fremantle Police Court for using insulting and abusive language towards him, but at the hearing on 10 November 1911, Resident Magistrate Dowley dismissed the summons, and ordered that neither party pay the other's costs.

By that time, Albrecht had gained the sympathy of Koombana's crew. At a meeting of the Seamen's Union of Australia held in Fremantle the same evening, a large majority of the 60 members present, including representatives from other ships, decided that Koombana's crew should not resume work until the chief steward was removed from the ship. The decision was immediately conveyed to Captain Allen and the acting manager of the Adelaide Steamship Company, Mr AE Lewis.

Koombana's agents responded by deciding on 11 November 1911 to delay her next departure indefinitely. That day, the postal authorities were told that the mail contract would have to be suspended for the time being, and 16 firemen were paid off. Subsequently, the general secretary of the Firemen and Seamen's Union, Mr Cooper, telegrammed the crew from Sydney advising them to resume work, to avoid seriously jeopardising a case before the Arbitration Court in the eastern states.

On 17 November 1911, the recently elected new Premier, John Scaddan, intervened in the dispute, at the request of Labor Senators. He sent a delegation of two State MPs to a mass meeting of the union in Fremantle. The two MPs urged the crew to return to work, on the understanding that an investigation of their complaints would be made. The delegation, together with two union representatives, then met Captain Allen and the acting manager at the company's office. The company promised a thorough investigation into the grievances. Captain Allen guaranteed that food supplies would be of good quality and quantity, and that the chief steward should treat the firemen with respect. But after the delegation had reported back to the mass meeting, the members present voted overwhelmingly not to go back aboard, unless the chief steward was transferred to another ship.

Further negotiations followed between Mr Moxon, the WA general manager of the company, and the protesting firemen. Mr Moxon claimed that it would be an act of persecution to dismiss the chief steward without an inquiry being held into the allegations against him. However, the firemen were unmoved. At the request of Senator Guthrie, the general secretary of the Firemen and Seamen's Union in Melbourne, Mr Moxon then broke off the negotiations. Meanwhile, Senator Guthrie arranged for a fresh crew of 16 men, accompanied by two executive officers, to travel from Melbourne to Adelaide by express train, and from Adelaide to Fremantle by steamship.

On 24 November 1911, the chief steward "fell down in a fit" and was taken to a private hospital. The same day, the President of the Commonwealth Arbitration Court, Mr Justice H. B. Higgins, sitting in Melbourne, delivered his proposed award in the claim by the Federated Seamen's Union against the Commonwealth Steamship Owners. Although Mr Justice Higgins indicated that he proposed to grant the union's main demands, he then observed that Koombana's crew, in defiance of the union's executive, was breaching the existing agreement. He therefore deferred for a week the making of an award, and indicated that he would not do so at all if the position of Koombana did not change.

Five days later, on the evening of 29 November 1911, the fresh crew for Koombana reached Fremantle from the eastern states aboard SS Riverina. They were immediately signed on. Koombana sailed the next day, 30 November 1911, with her crew including chief steward Johnson, who had recovered. News of the resolution of the dispute was then telegramned to Melbourne, where it was welcomed by Mr Justice Higgins.

== Loss ==
=== Cyclone ===
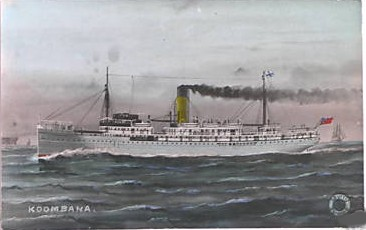
A postcard of Koombana at sea, showing her Adelaide Steamship Co funnel livery of dark buff with a black top

Koombana left Port Hedland for Broome on the morning of Wednesday, 20 March 1912 with a fresh north easterly blowing, followed by Bullarra, which had recently returned to the northwest passenger and cargo trade. Before leaving, her Master, Captain Allen, had reported a falling barometer and suggested that the voyage may take longer than normal. However, he and Captain Upjohn, Master of Bullarra, had decided in conversation prior to departure that there was nothing in it, and neither man expected to encounter such a storm as was later recorded in Bullarra's log book as "A Howling Hurricane".

Several hours after leaving, the two ships changed course as a heavy northeasterly gale set in, and they became separated. The storm increased and Bullarra suffered damage but was able to reach Cossack. She later returned to Port Hedland missing her funnel, reporting that the eye of the cyclone had passed directly over. But Koombana was not seen again.

A sailing ship, Crown of England, was wrecked on Depuch Island. Another ship, Concordia, was beached nearby. Several lighter vessels and pearling luggers were also sunk or wrecked.

The cyclone crossed the coast two days later on 22 March just west of Balla Balla, a minor port for the Whim Creek copper mines. Damage was reported for more than 200 kilometres (120 mi) along the coast.

After Koombana became overdue in Broome several days later, public concern was raised and a search organised. On 2 April one of the search ships steamed through a quantity of wreckage about 25 nautical miles (46 km) north of Bedout Island and 100 kilometres (62 mi) offshore. But the only wreckage recovered from Koombana was part of a starboard bow planking of a motor launch, a state-room door, and panel from the promenade deck, two planks for covering tanks of lifeboats, and some air tanks. The air tanks were found on the mainland. The other wreckage was found at sea.

=== Prominent passengers ===
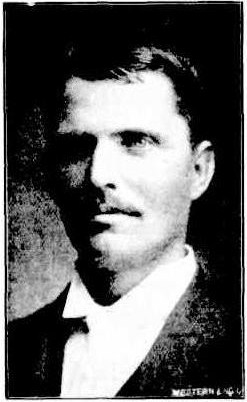
Corporal Frank Buttle

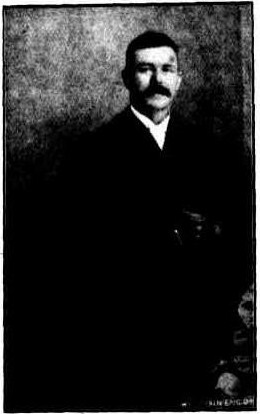
FWB Clinch

Aboard Koombana when she sank were several passengers prominent in the north of Western Australia. They included:

- Captain Pearson, the wharfinger at Derby. An old sea captain, he had formerly been employed by Melbourne Steamship Company, and had lived for many years in Fremantle.
- Corporal Frank Buttle, who had been in charge of the Derby police for about three years. He was returning from a holiday in Perth. His descendants include Brownlow Medal winning Australian rules footballer Graham Moss.
- George Simpson, the Department of Public Works official in charge of public works on the north coast. His last major work was in connection with the building of the lighthouse at Broome. Simpson was from NSW, a grandson of the colonial innkeeper, pastoralist and politician Nicolas Hyeronimus. He was also more distantly related to the Suttor dynasty of early NSW politicians, and to Grosvenor Francis, member of the House of Representatives for the seat of Kennedy in Queensland between 1925 and 1929. He left a widow and six children.
- Mr JS Davis, manager of the Broome office of Siebe Gorman & Co Ltd, "submarine engineers".
- Mr WP Milne, of the Department of Public Works, who was going to Derby with a gang of five men – W Davis, A Baker, G Martin, H Hereford and E Green – to carry out works. He had long been a member of a government boring party, and had done much boring work on one of the stock routes in the far north.
- George Piper and RH Jenkins, who were managers of stations for Emanuel Brothers Ltd, and were returning to Derby from a trip to Perth. As of 1912, Emanuel Brothers were prominent suppliers of stock and meat to Perth and the goldfields. Piper had previously worked for Sidney Kidman, who had sent him to Western Australia to manage Meda Station for Forrest and Emanuel. He was accompanied on Koombana by his brother, Alfred C Piper, another former Kidman employee. Mr Kidman was quoted after Koombana's disappearance as saying that "George was one of the smartest men they have had in the west, and his brother was a very capable man, too." Jenkins had been a stock manager for Emanuel Brothers for over a decade, and was accompanied on Koombana by his daughter.
- Deane Sparke, who was a storekeeper in Derby. He had been returning from holidays in Perth.
- Frederick WB Clinch, of Elder, Shenton & Co, who had been on his way to Derby to supervise embarking cattle aboard Bullarra. His father, James Clinch, had founded the Berkshire Valley farm near Moora, and was the first European settler in the Moora area. Frederick Clinch left a widow and six daughters.
- Captain Charles Brown Stuart, who was engaged in pearling on his own account, and was returning to Broome from a business trip to Port Hedland.
- Abraham de Vahl Davis, a resident of Broome, and manager of the Australian business of his brother-in-law, Mr Mark Rubin, whose business interests embraced pearling, pastoral and other business concerns. As part of the pearling business, he accompanied the infamous Roseate Pearl which Mark Rubin had bought for A£12,000 in a chest of Broome Pearls due for London and Paris. Mr de Vahl Davis was an uncle of Mark Rubin's son, Bernard Rubin, who won the 1928 24 Hours of Le Mans, in a Bentley 4½ Litre. His descendants include Graham de Vahl Davis, Emeritus Professor in the School of Mechanical & Manufacturing Engineering at the University of New South Wales.
- Rev Robert W Main, who had been travelling north on behalf of the Presbyterian Church of Western Australia to find a suitable place for a mission station for Aborigines.

=== Crew ===
==== Master ====
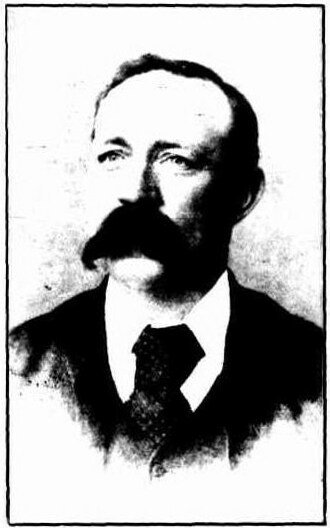
Captain T M Allen, master of Koombana at the time of her loss.

Captain Thomas M Allen, master of Koombana on her last voyage, was a 52-year-old bachelor. Born in South Australia, he had been educated at Port Adelaide Grammar School. His father, Thomas Allen was a Cork Irishman who had been a shipmaster and owner between the 1850s and 1880s, and had frequently visited Albany and Fremantle. As a child, Tom Allen had sailed with his parents around Australia, and later to New Caledonia. In 1873, he had sailed from Port Darwin aboard the barque Constant, commanded by his father, for Rockingham, Western Australia, to load jarrah, but Constant was wrecked at Rockingham, after blowing from her anchors during a north-westerly gale.

Early in his seafaring career, Captain Allen worked on sailing ships, as master of a tug, and on several occasions for the Adelaide Steamship Co. As quartermaster of the Orient Steam Navigation Company's Cuzco, he was one of a couple of hands who, in heavy seas, volunteered to go over her stern and secure her propeller, after she had broken her screw shaft. He also commanded several ships, beginning with the barque Verulam. In 1897, as commander of the coastal ship Marloo, he was convicted by a jury of manslaughter because a man had fallen down a hold, but the Attorney-General ignored the verdict.

Later that year, Captain Allen was appointed to the pilot service on the Port Adelaide River. In 1901 he was chosen to take the royal yacht HMS Ophir up the river, when the then Duke and Duchess of Cornwall and York (later King George V and Queen Mary) visited Australia. One of the most skilful navigators in Australia, he was the first South Australian born seafarer to be awarded an extra master's certificate.

He left the pilot service in 1906 and rejoined the Adelaide Steamship Company, which sent him to England to bring out Junee in 1907 and Echunga in early 1908. After a voyage to Valparaíso in Echunga, he commanded many of the company's coastal steamships, including Grantala, Bullarra and Winfield. In his career as master and pilot, he had had no mishaps before Koombana's disappearance.

==== Other crew ====
Norman Jamieson, Chief Officer of Koombana when she sank, had formerly been Chief Officer of Yongala. He had changed ships to Grantala immediately before Yongala's final voyage, and later was transferred to Koombana.

Koombana's chief steward when she sank was FW Johnson, who had been at the centre of the labor dispute four months earlier. He was from South Australia. His brother-in-law and niece were also aboard Koombana's final voyage.

== Aftermath ==
On 21 April 1912, a memorial concert in memory of Koombana's victims was held at His Majesty's Theatre, Perth. Many dignitaries, and hundreds of other people attended. In an address to the audience, the newly elected Dean of Perth, the Very Reverend HF Mercer, appealed for support to a Koombana relief fund, which had been established by the Lord Mayor of Perth and owner of the theatre, Thomas Molloy.

After Koombana's loss, the Adelaide Steamship Co sent another of its ships, Allinga, to take over the northwest run. Soon after, the company withdrew Allinga from the route, after it lost the contract to the State Shipping Service of Western Australia, that the Scaddan government had recently established. The company's withdrawal was a major impetus for the early development of the State Shipping Service, which was to dominate the northwest trade for the rest of the twentieth century.

=== Court of Marine Inquiry ===
At request of the Colonial Secretary, a Court of Marine Inquiry was held at Fremantle, just over a month after Koombana's loss. The Court comprised Mr EP Dowley as President, and Captains FL Parkes and JWW Yates as assessors. Evidence was led on 25, 26 and 29 April 1912 by the Crown Prosecutor, Frank Parker, on behalf of the Chief Harbourmaster. A closing address was made on 3 May 1912 by ML Moss KC, on behalf of Adelaide Steamship Co.

The Court gave its verdict on 10 May 1912. It found that Koombana had sailed from Port Hedland at about 10:20 am on 20 March 1912, drawing 19 ft (5.8 m) aft and about 12 ft (3.7 m) forward. She had been in excellent trim, and with her propeller well submerged. She had set course to round Bedout Island en route to Broome, on a voyage that was usually accomplished in about 24 hours. The southward bound Bullarra, which had left about a half hour later, had Koombana in sight until about noon. At about 6:30 pm that day, the wind had risen until it became a violent hurricane lasting for several hours, Koombana had not been seen or heard of since.

The Court could not say what became of Koombana, but it seemed reasonably clear that the hurricane had caused her total loss at sea. When leaving Port Hedland, she had been carrying 260 tons of cargo, properly stowed, 460 tons of coal, 871 tons of water in her tanks, 60 tons of stores, 76 passengers and 74 crew. Her stability with her known load had been tested with Ralston's stability indicator, and seven other tests had been made with the indicator under varying conditions of load. In each test, Koombana's stability had been shown to be entirely satisfactory.

Further confirmation of the ship's stability and seaworthiness was found in her career. All witnesses with experience in her had deposed to her very excellent seagoing qualities. Both Captain Allen and his Chief Officer had held extra masters' certificates, and were men of great experience on the Australian coast. The Court was satisfied that Koombana, in construction, stability and seaworthiness, was equal to any ship in her class in the Australian coastal trade. It concluded that her stability and seaworthiness were unassailable, the competency and carefulness of her Master beyond question, and that after being lost sight of at sea on 20 March 1912, "... her fate passes beyond human knowledge and remains a mystery of the sea."

=== Theories about the loss ===
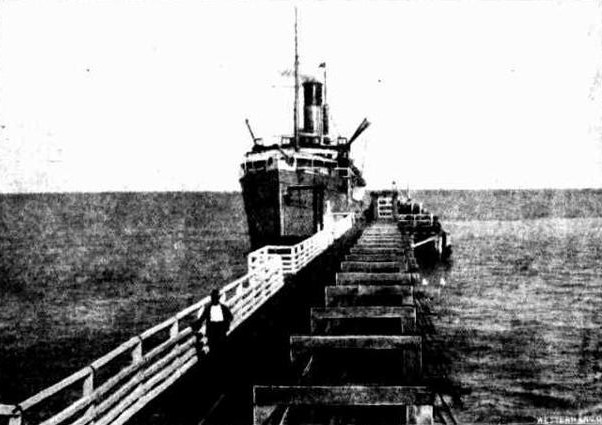
Koombana at Broome jetty, about 1911.

The Court's findings were not universally accepted. A number of commentators asserted that Koombana was "top heavy". She was said to have been "... built to scrape into the most horrible little bays and estuaries", and "... slightly unstable because [she] had to be shallow enough to get over the sandbar at Port Hedland". Koombana has also been described as narrow-bottomed, wide-topped and built for speed more than anything else. In 1946, Edward Angelo, a former long time MLA for northwest electorates, who had travelled on over 100 ship voyages, wrote that "Although I greatly admired [Koombana's] appointments, I never liked her, considering her too top heavy. She always had a list, even when tied up at jetties." However, the assertions made soon after the disappearance of Koombana that she was top heavy were disputed by her inaugural chief engineer.

It was also asserted that Koombana left Port Hedland unballasted, so that she could clear the sand bar at the harbour mouth.

In light of all of these claims, there has been speculation that Koombana may have capsized in the heavy sea, due to a combination of structural top heaviness and empty ballast tanks.

In an article published on 19 May 1912, The Sunday Times (Perth, WA) observed that Koombana had not survived the first big storm she had encountered. In response to the Court of Marine Inquiry's report, the article commented that "[n]o attempt whatever was made to produce independent expert evidence as to the stability of the steamer, and by that we mean her ability to live in a cyclone, and not her constructional strength." The article went on to report a number of comments by a Port Hedland journalist, Mr Barker, on the Court's findings. According to Barker, who had interviewed Captain Allen in Port Hedland, many pearling luggers had run into the creek for shelter before Koombana left Port Hedland, and Captain Allen himself had been reluctant to leave until after speaking with Captain Upjohn. Barker also claimed that upon leaving, Koombana had had "an ugly list to port", and "was rolling heavily, her propeller at times being out of the water".

The Sunday Times therefore called for a second inquiry, by the Commonwealth government, but no such inquiry was held.

== Possible discoveries ==
In 1973, what seemed to be the remains of a large ship were found in deep water about 20 nautical miles (37 km) off Eighty Mile Beach, about midway between Port Hedland and Broome. In 1985, crew members testing magnetic detection equipment on a Royal Australian Air Force Lockheed P-3 Orion reported a significant magnetic anomaly on the seabed 75 kilometres (40 nmi) off Bedout Island.

In August 1987, a specially equipped United States Navy research aircraft was sent to Port Hedland to search for the wreck in conjunction with the National Oceanic and Atmospheric Administration (NOAA) and an Australian research group. A US Navy crew flew the aircraft, another Lockheed Orion (RP-3D BuNo. 158227, operated in support of NOAA's Project Magnet), equipped with a vector magnetometer, and carrying scientists from NOAA. The Navy crew comprised aviators Deborah Anderson, Brad Huotari and Glenn Gosnell with navigators John Sheppard and Ruth Perron. The unique aircraft was painted international orange and white and had the "Road Runner" cartoon as nose art. It made several flights over the suspected area of the ship, seeking magnetic anomalies. Several promising indications were to be investigated by the Australian group.

In the years leading up to the centenary of Koombana's loss, there have been numerous deep-water expeditions to seek her wreck, but by the time of the centenary, she had still not been found.

== Legacy ==
=== The "death pearl" ===
Aboard Koombana when she sank was a Broome resident and pearl dealer, Abraham de Vahl Davis, the secretary of Mark Rubin, who had bought the "Roseate Pearl" for 12,000 Australian pounds. The loss led to Mark Rubin buying De Grey in 1912 with 63,000 sheep for a 100,000 pounds, and Mulyie and Warrawagine Stations in 1916 providing the wool for the British Army in both World Wars. Davis boarded Koombana there for the voyage to Broome, supposedly taking the Roseate Pearl with him. Mark travelled to Europe after the loss of Koombana to try to recover the loss, realised the World was going to war, and sold Broome Pearls and bought the stations. Jenny Hardie's book Nor'Westers of the Pilbara breed and Ion Idriess's book Forty Fathoms deep verify the ownership of the pearl. Legend had seven of the previous owners die after acquiring the pearl. After Koombana's loss, a further legend grew, blaming her loss on this allegedly cursed stone.

=== Centenary commemorations ===
Early in 2012, to commemorate the centenary of Koombana's loss, the Port Hedland Historical Society organised a program of activities for the weekend of 17–18 March 2012. It included a Captain's Table dinner, a ceremonial laying of floral tributes at Port Hedland's Koombana lookout and an exhibition of artefacts at Dalgety House Cottage. At least 13 descendants of those lost on Koombana planned to make the trip to Port Hedland for the weekend. However, on 15 March 2012 the Society was forced to postpone the event, due to the impending approach of Tropical Cyclone Lua.

On 24 March 2012, a Koombana centenary exhibition opened at the WA Maritime Museum in Fremantle. The exhibition, which was replicated in Port Hedland, was developed by the Western Australian Museum in consultation with the Port Hedland Historical Society, with financial support from the Port Hedland Port Authority. According to WA Museum chief executive Alec Coles, "The exhibition relates what is known of Koombana’s final hours, and describes the far-reaching search which took place following her disappearance."

The Port Hedland Historical Society's postponed commemorative activities were rescheduled to the weekend of 27–28 April 2012. They culminated in the laying of a wreath for those lost aboard the ship.

== See also ==
- List of maritime disasters
- Shipwrecks of Western Australia
- Waratah, a steamship lost in 1909 off South Africa
- Yongala, a steamship lost in 1911 off Queensland

== Bibliography ==
- Aslett, Geoffrey Garrard (2000). Henry Francis – Gentleman of Cumberland Street. Jindalee, QLD: G Aslett. ISBN 0-9578534-1-6.
- Bailey, John (2001). The White Divers of Broome. Sydney: Pan Macmillan. ISBN 0-7329-1078-1.
- Barker, Malcolm (2001). The truth is so precious. Dianella, WA: Success Print. ISBN 0-646-49948-3.
- Beatty, Bill (1960). A Treasury of Australian Folk Tales and Traditions. Sydney: U Smith. OCLC 252002047.
- Boyd, Annie (2013). Koombana Days. Fremantle: Fremantle Press. ISBN 978-1921888885. *Idriess, Ion L (1937). Forty Fathoms Deep. Sydney: Angus & Robertson. OCLC 561458581.
- Lloyd's Register of British and Foreign Shipping Vol. I – Steamers. London: Lloyd's Register. 1908 – via Internet Archive.
- McCarthy, Mike; Western Australian Maritime Museum. Dept. of Maritime Archaeology (1991). The Flamingo Bay voyage: including reports on Japanese submarine I 124, the iron barque Ann Millicent, Indonesian divers at Cartier Island, inspection of a site thought to be the SS Koombana. Fremantle, WA: WA Maritime Museum.
- Mercantile Navy List. London. 1910 – via Crew List Index Project.
- Plowman, Peter (2001). Coast to Coast: The Great Australian Coastal Liners. Dural, NSW: Rosenberg Publishing. pp. 39–45. ISBN 978-1-877058-60-8.
- Thom, Kerry (2009). "The searches for SS Koombana". Iron, Steel and Steamship Archaeology: Proceedings of 2nd Australian Seminar, Held in Perth, Melbourne and Sydney, 2006. Fremantle, WA: Australian National Centre of Excellence for Maritime Archaeology and Australasian Institute for Maritime Archaeology Inc: 38–39. ISBN 978-1-876465-01-8. ISSN 0812-9444.
- Wilson, Helen Helga (1980). Cyclone Coasts: Australia's North-West Frontier. Adelaide: Rigby. ISBN 0-7270-1390-4.
