= Suttor =

Suttor is a surname. Notable people with the surname include:

- Dudley Suttor (1892–1962), Australian who played rugby union for Australia
- Francis Bathurst Suttor (1839–1915), Australian pastoralist and politician, son of William Henry Suttor
- George Suttor (1774–1859), pioneer settler of Australia, father of William Henry and John Bligh Suttor
- John Bligh Suttor (1809–1886), Australian politician, brother of William Henry Suttor
- Rory Suttor (born 1998), Australian rugby union player
- Timothy Suttor (1926–1997), Australian Catholic theologian
- William Henry Suttor (1805–1877), an Australian pastoralist and politician, father of William Suttor Jr. and Francis Bathurst Suttor
- William Suttor Jr. (1834–1905), Australian politician and pastoralist, son of William Henry Suttor

== See also ==
- Suttor River, river in Central Queensland, named after William Henry Suttor
- Suttor River Causeway (built 1876), heritage-listed crossing of the Suttor River
- Suttor Developmental Road, State Route 11, Queensland, that crosses the Suttor River
- Suttor, Queensland, locality near the Suttor River
