= SS Yongala =

Passenger steamship that was wrecked in Queensland, Australia

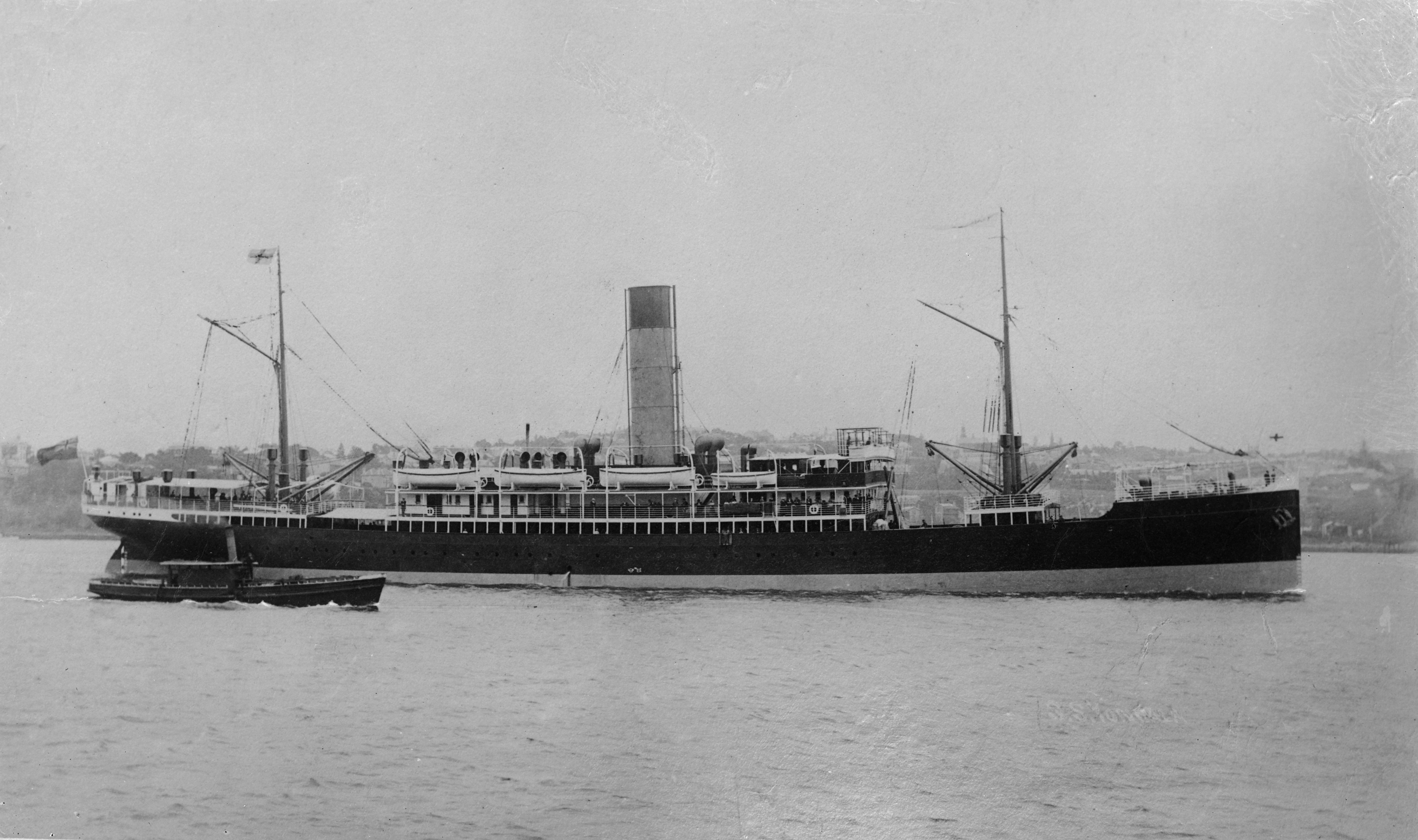
- Yongala in port

History

Australia
- Name: Yongala
- Namesake: Yongala, South Australia
- Owner: Adelaide Steamship Company
- Port of registry: Port Adelaide
- Builder: Armstrong, Whitworth & Co, Low Walker
- Cost: £102,000
- Yard number: 736
- Launched: 29 April 1903
- Completed: October 1903
- Identification: UK official number 118332; code letters VGFH
- Fate: Lost with all hands, 23 March 1911
- Notes: One of the largest, best-preserved shipwrecks in Queensland

General characteristics
- Type: Ocean Liner
- Tonnage: 3,664 GRT, 1,825 NRT
- Length: 350.0 ft (106.7 m)
- Beam: 45.2 ft (13.8 m)
- Depth: 27.2 ft (8.3 m)
- Decks: 2
- Installed power: 690 NHP
- Propulsion: 1 × screw; 1 × triple expansion engine
- Speed: 16 knots (30 km/h)
- Capacity: Passengers: 110 first class; 130 second class; Cargo: 3,000 tons, including 10,000 cubic feet (280 m^{3}) refrigerated
- Crew: 72
- Notes: sister ship: Grantala

SS Yongala was a passenger steamship that was built in England in 1903 for the Adelaide Steamship Company. She sank in a cyclone off the coast of Queensland on 23 March 1911, with the loss of all 122 passengers and crew aboard.

Her wreck off Cape Bowling Green was found in 1958. It is now a popular wreck diving site, protected by the Commonwealth Underwater Cultural Heritage Act 2018.

Yongala was the sister ship of Grantala, which in 1914 became Australia's only hospital ship in the First World War.

== Building and identification ==
In 1903 Sir WG Armstrong, Whitworth & Co built a pair of passenger and cargo steamships at its Low Walker shipyard at Newcastle upon Tyne for the Adelaide Steamship Co. Yongala was built as yard number 736, launched on 29 April 1903, and completed that October. She was named after the town of Yongala, South Australia. The name is a Ngadjuri word that means "broad water", or "broad wide watering place". Her sister ship Grantala was yard number 737, launched on 28 May 1903, and completed that December.

Yongala's registered length was 350.0 ft (106.7 m), her beam was 45.2 ft (13.8 m) and her depth was 27.2 ft (8.3 m). Her tonnages were 3,664 GRT and 1,825 NRT. She had a single screw, driven by a three-cylinder triple expansion engine built by the Wallsend Slipway Company. She had five single-ended boilers, which supplied steam to her engine at 180 lb_{f}/in^{2} (1,200 kPa). Her furnaces burned about 67 tonnes of coal per day. Her engine was rated at 690 NHP and gave her a speed of 16 knots (30 km/h).

Yongala had accommodation for 110 first-class and 130 second-class passengers, and holds for about 3,000 tons of cargo. She had electric lighting throughout. She had a direct acting steam windlass and capstan on her forecastle head. To handle her cargo she had two steam cranes and seven winches with derricks. A specially arranged steam and hand steering gear was fitted in a house at the after end of the fantail and controlled from the bridge. She had 10,000 cubic feet (283 m^{3}) of refrigerated space: 3,000 cubic feet (85 m^{3}) chilled for vegetables and provisions, and 7,000 cubic feet (200 m^{3}) for frozen meat.

The Adelaide Steamship Co registered Yongala at Port Adelaide. Her UK official number was 118332 and her code letters were VGFH.

== Service history ==
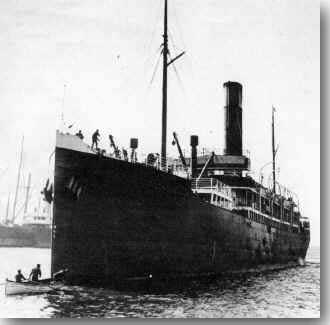
Yongala in port

Yongala began her delivery voyage from Southampton in England on 9 October 1903. She sustained some damage in heavy weather crossing the Bay of Biscay, called at Las Palmas and Cape Town, and on 24 November reached Fremantle. When she continued her voyage from Fremantle to Adelaide, it was alleged that she raced the Orient Steam Navigation Company mail ship RMS Orizaba, and that Yongala won the race. The Adelaide Steamship Company publicly denied that any race took place. On 30 November she reached Port Adelaide, where Adelaide Steamship Co shareholders inspected her. She reached Melbourne on 3 December and Grafton Wharf in Sydney on 6 December.

In 1905 Yongala's regular route linked Fremantle and Sydney via Adelaide and Melbourne. In 1906 her summer route was extended to Brisbane. At 2,700 nautical miles (5,000 km) this was Australia's longest interstate shipping route, and Yongala was the first ship to work it. Each winter from 1907 to 1911 she worked the route between Melbourne and Cairns instead.

== Loss ==
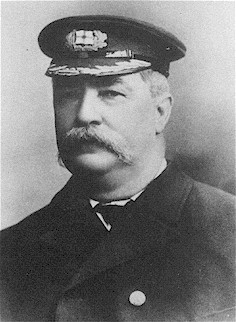
Captain William Knight in 1911

On 14 March 1911 Yongala began her 99th voyage in Australian waters. Her Master was Captain William Knight. She left Melbourne with 72 passengers, and on 20 March reached Brisbane. There most of her passengers from Melbourne disembarked, and she embarked passengers to continue up the Queensland coast. Also embarked were the racehorse "Moonshine" and a Lincoln Red bull. A harbour inspection reported Yongala to be "in excellent trim".

She reached Mackay on the morning of 23 March, and left at 1:40 p.m. that afternoon, bound for Townsville. She was now carrying 29 first-class passengers, 19 second-class passengers, 72 crew, and 677 tons of cargo. Shortly after she left Mackay, and before she left the sight of land, the Flat Top Island signal station received a telegram warning of a tropical cyclone between Townsville and Mackay. The signal station sent flag and wireless telegraph signals, which prompted several ships to take refuge at Mackay. But Yongala did not see the flags. The Marconi Company had recently dispatched a wireless telegraph set from England to be installed aboard Yongala, but the set had not yet reached Australia.

Five hours after Yongala left Mackay, the keeper of Dent Island Light saw her enter Whitsunday Passage. This was the last known sighting of her. The cyclone sank her on the night of 23–24 March, killing everyone aboard. Newspapers at the time counted 120 or 121 people aboard, but the total number is now accepted to be at least 122. The discrepancy arises from young children, servants, and members of ethnic minorities being omitted from official lists.

== Aftermath ==
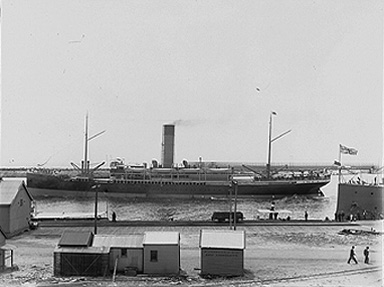
Yongala in Fremantle

When Yongala did not reach Townsville on time, at first it was assumed that, like other ships, she had taken shelter from the cyclone. But on 26 March she was listed as "missing". The Premier of Queensland, Digby Denham, ordered a search for her, in which seven vessels took part. Wreckage started to wash ashore on the Queensland coast between Hinchinbrook Island and Bowen. The body of the racehorse "Moonshine" was found at Gordon Creek, but no trace was found of any of the passengers or crew. The Queensland Government offered a £1,000 reward for information enabling the ship to be found. The reward went unclaimed, so it was eventually withdrawn.

It was speculated that either the cyclone had overwhelmed Yongala, or she may have grounded on a reef between Flinders Passage and Keeper Reef, or on Nares Rock, or on Cape Upstart.

Within days of the ship's loss, "Yongala distress fund" was set up. Money raised was used to relieve the dependants of those aboard. The fund was closed on 30 September 1914, with the £900 remaining credited to the Queensland Shipwreck Society.

Between 8 and 20 June 1911 the Marine Board of Queensland held an inquiry into Yongala's loss. The Board considered the ship's stability, equipment and seaworthiness, and Captain Knight's abilities as a shipmaster. It found no fault with the condition of the ship, based on design specifications supplied by the Adelaide Steamship Co, along with data from sea trials and seven years of uneventful operation. Nor did it find fault with Knight's ability. He was one of Adelaide Steamship Co's most capable men, and had 14 years' service without incident. The Board declared that it had "no desire to indulge in idle speculation", and concluded that "the fate of the Yongala passes beyond human ken into the realms of conjecture, to add one more to the long roll of mysteries of the sea".

== Discovery ==
In 1943, a minesweeper fouled on what was then thought to be a shoal, 11 miles east of Cape Bowling Green. The commander marked on his chart an obstruction at a depth of about 13 fathoms (24 m), on the route of vessels bound for Townsville.

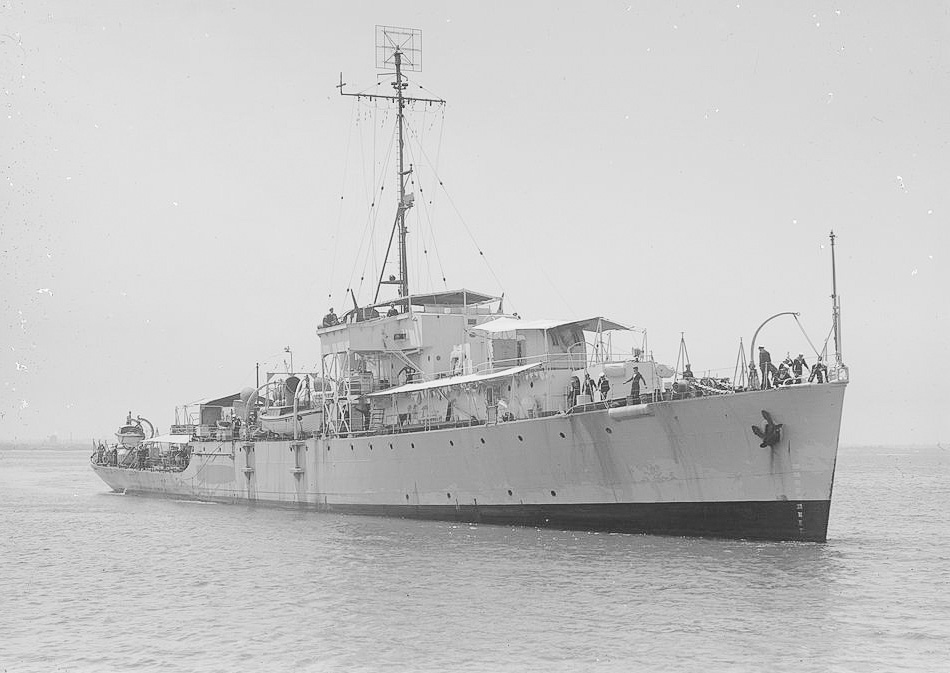
HMAS Lachlan

In June 1947, the survey vessel HMAS Lachlan investigated the location using echo sounding and anti-submarine equipment. She found a shoal about 300 feet (91 m) long, at a depth of about 6 fathoms (11 m), surrounded by water 12 to 14 fathoms (22 to 26 m) deep, and concluded that it could be the wreck of a steamship.

In 1958 a local fisherman, Bill Kirkpatrick, found the wreck, and recovered artefacts including a safe from one of the cabins. The safe contained only black sludge, but part of the safe's serial number was legible: 9825W. In 1961, Chubb in England identified this as the number of the safe that it supplied to Armstrong, Whitworth & Co. in 1903 for the cabin of Yongala's purser.

== Wreck site ==
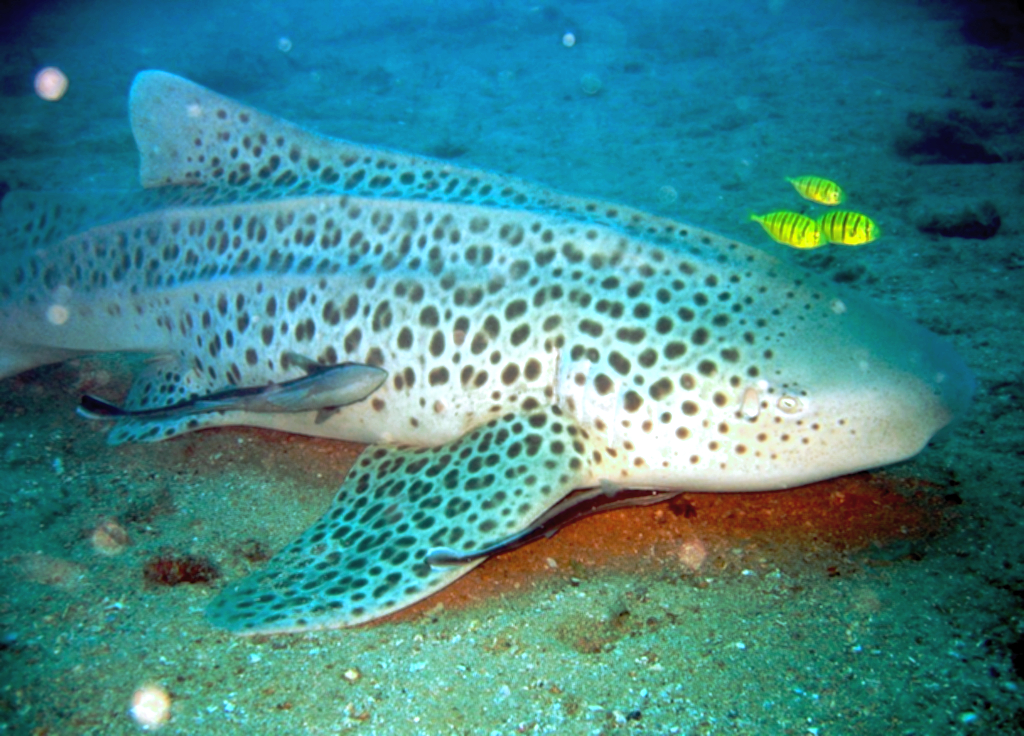
Fish next to Yongala's wreck: a zebra shark, Stegostoma tigrinum, attended by a live sharksucker, Echeneis naucrates, and three juvenile golden trevally Gnathanodon speciosus

Yongala's wreck is at position 19°18′16″S 147°37′31″E, in the central section of the Great Barrier Reef Marine Park, about 48 nautical miles (89 km) south-east of Townsville and 12 nautical miles (22 km) east of Cape Bowling Green. The wreck is 109 metres (358 ft) long. The bow points on a northerly bearing of 347 degrees, and lists to starboard at an angle of between 60 and 70 degrees. It retains its structural integrity. The depth of water to the sea floor is about 30 metres (98 ft), with the upper parts of the wreck 16 metres (52 ft) below the surface.

The sea floor around the wreck is open and sandy, so the wreck has become an established artificial reef, providing a structurally complex habitat for diverse marine life. In 1981 the marine biologist Leon Zann sketched the wreck. Its superstructure remains intact and much as in his sketch, but a significant buildup of sand around the starboard side of the vessel has been scoured away, and the ventilators and railings have collapsed.

The wreck is protected by the Commonwealth Underwater Cultural Heritage Act 2018 and is managed via the Museum of Tropical Queensland, Townsville. The Act prohibits penetration diving and interference with artefacts.

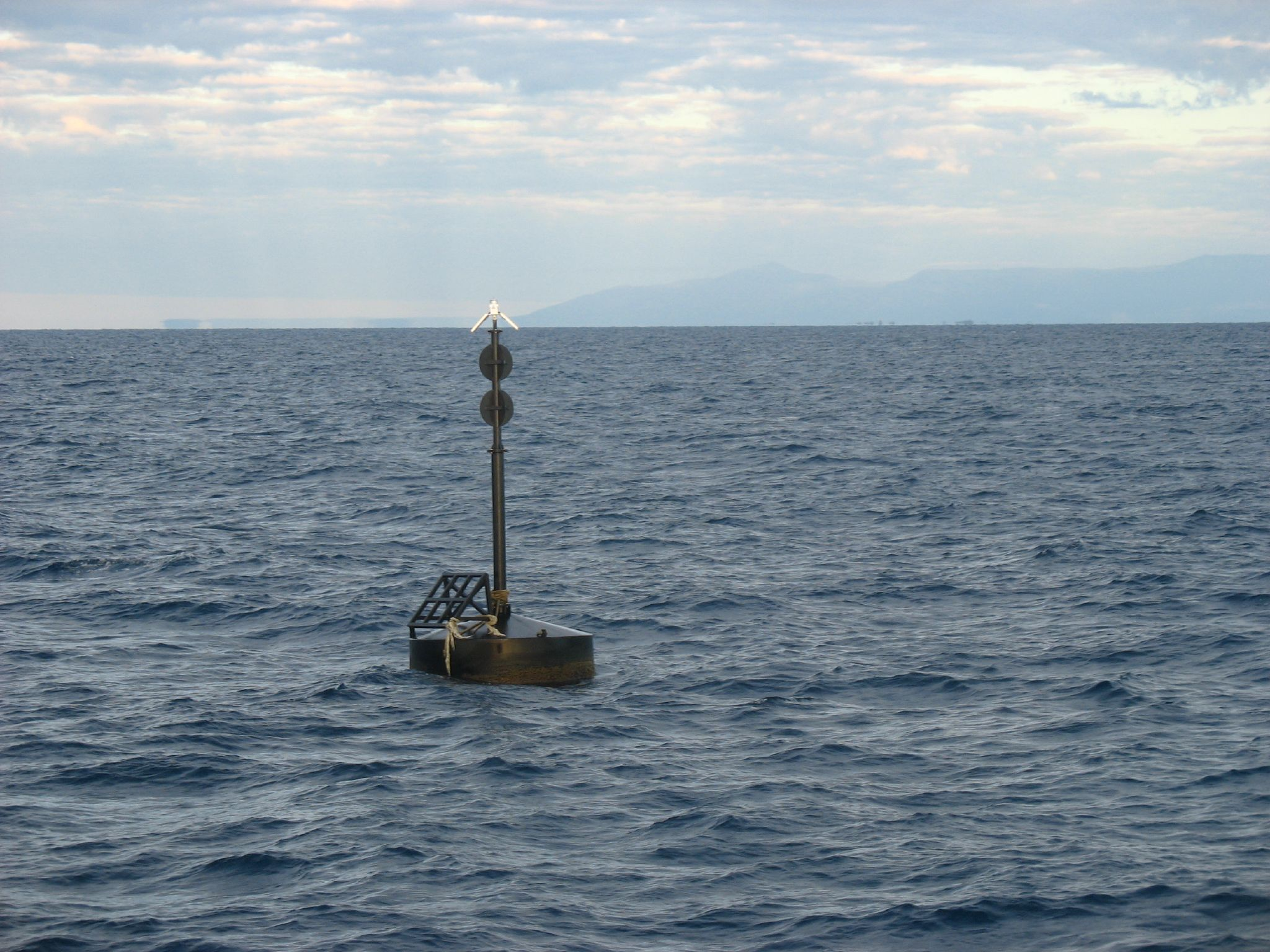
A buoy marking Yongala's wreck

A protected zone encompasses both the wreck, all the seabed within a radius of 797 metres (2,615 ft) from the wreck, and the waters above. Access to the site is via permit only, obtainable from the Maritime Archaeology Section of the Museum of Tropical Queensland. In 2002, to prevent further damage by careless anchoring, several moorings were installed, and anchoring within the protected zone was forbidden. The site was also listed on the now-defunct Register of the National Estate.

== Present day ==
Yongala is now a major tourist attraction for recreational diving in Townsville and North Queensland, with more than 10,000 divers visiting the wreck each year. At 110 metres (361 ft) long, she is one of the largest, most intact historic shipwrecks. The site has diverse marine life. A citizen science database using iNaturalist has recorded more than 213 observations of 79 species. The most observed species is the Humphead wrasse, Cheilinus undulatus. An episode of the BBC television documentary series Great Barrier Reef featured the wreck's biodiversity.

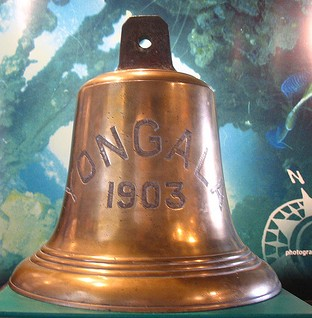
Yongala's ship's bell in the Maritime Museum of Townsville

The Maritime Museum of Townsville has an extensive display of Yongala artefacts and memorabilia, including her ship's bell.

The death of Tina Watson occurred near the dive site on 22 October 2003. Watson's husband of eleven days was subsequently imprisoned for manslaughter.

The heritage-listed Yongala Lodge in North Ward, Townsville, is named after the ship. It was built for Matthew Rooney, who died in the Yongala shipwreck along with his wife and youngest daughter.

== See also ==
- List of maritime disasters
- Koombana, a steamship lost in 1912 off Western Australia
- Waratah, a steamship lost in 1909 off South Africa
- Protected areas of Australia – Protected areas in Australia

== Bibliography ==
- Gleeson, Max (1987). Townsville's Titanic. Sydney: Turton & Armstrong. ISBN 0-908031-31-9. OCLC 27579405.
- Holthouse, Hector (1971). "Yongala Vanishes". Cyclone: A Centory of Cyclonic Destruction. Adelaide: Rigby. ISBN 0-85179-290-1. OCLC 251985.
- Lloyd's Register of British and Foreign Shipping. Vol. I.–Steamers. London: Lloyd's Register. 1904 – via Internet Archive.
- Mercantile Navy List. London. 1904 – via Crew List Index Project.
