= HMAS Lachlan =

River-class frigate that served the Royal Australian Navy

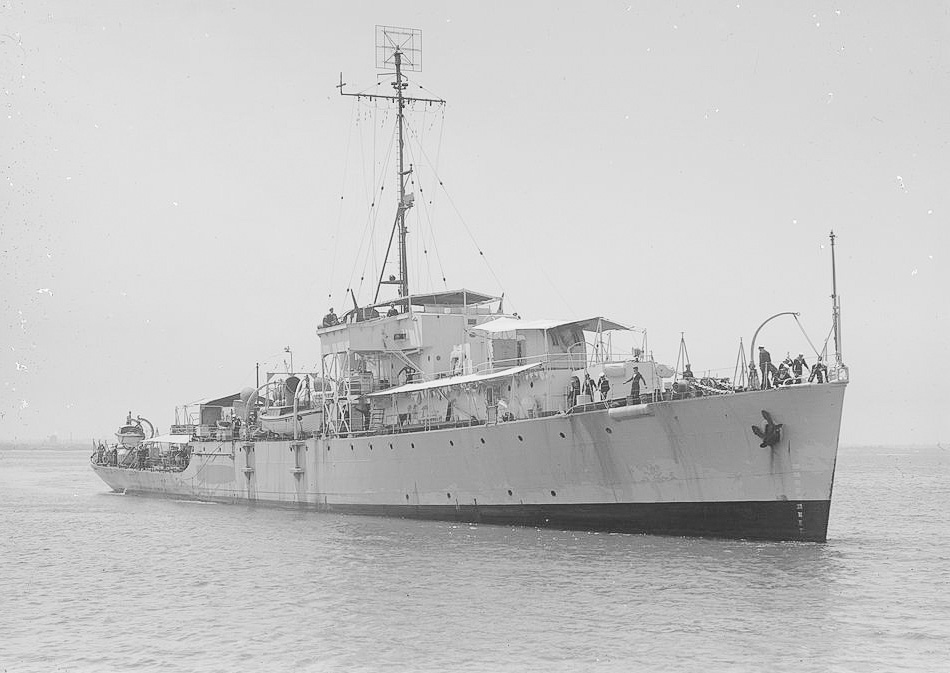
- HMAS Lachlan in 1946

History

Australia
- Name: Lachlan
- Namesake: Lachlan River
- Builder: Mort's Dock & Engineering Company, Sydney
- Laid down: 22 March 1943
- Launched: 25 March 1944
- Commissioned: 14 February 1945
- Decommissioned: 31 May 1949
- Fate: Transferred to Royal New Zealand Navy

New Zealand
- Name: Lachlan
- Commissioned: 5 October 1949
- Decommissioned: February 1975

General characteristics
- Class & type: River-class frigate
- Displacement: 2220 tonnes fully loaded
- Length: 91.8 metres, 86.3 at waterline
- Beam: 11.2 metres
- Propulsion: 2x shaft, two Admiralty 3 drum boilers, 4 cylinder triple expansion oil fired
- Speed: 20 knots
- Complement: 140 in RNZN service

HMAS Lachlan (K364/F364) (later HMNZS Lachlan (F364)) was a River-class frigate that served the Royal Australian Navy (RAN) from 1945 to 1949. The vessel was later transferred to the Royal New Zealand Navy serving as surveyor until 1975 and was eventually scrapped in 1993.

== Construction and design ==
Lachlan was laid down by Mort's Dock & Engineering Company, Sydney on 22 March 1943 and launched on 25 March 1944 by Sarah McNamara Scullin, wife of former Australian Prime Minister James Scullin, and commissioned on 14 February 1945. It was named after the Lachlan River in New South Wales

== Operational history ==
=== Australian service ===
During 1945, Lachlan was used during the opening of the Captain Cook Graving Dock; her bow was used to cut the ribbon across the drydock's mouth. In 1949, shortly before her decommissioning, she found the wreck of the SS Yongala, which sank with all 122 aboard in a cyclone in 1911. Her wreck was thought to be a shoal at that time.

Lachlan was paid off on 31 May 1949. She was transferred to the Royal New Zealand Navy, renamed HMNZS Lachlan, and was a survey and Antarctic supply ship until February 1975. She was used as a "Refit Barge" with many workshops onboard until the late 1980s when she was sold to Chile to continue work as floating workshops for ships being refitted.

=== New Zealand Service ===
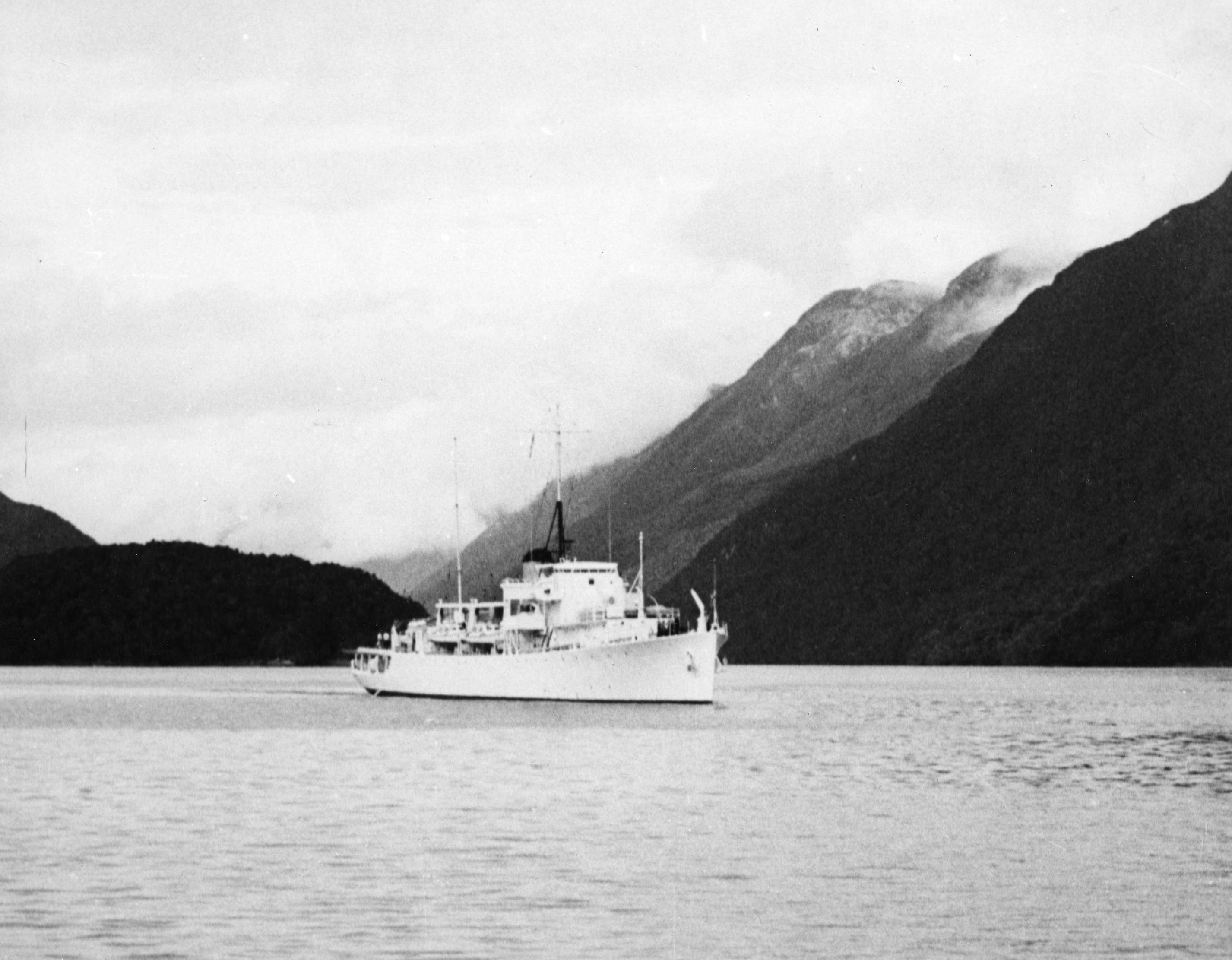
HMNZS Lachlan as a survey ship in Tamatea / Dusky Sound, South Island

In 1948, the New Zealand government sought a survey ship to use temporarily until a new one could be built in Britain. After negotiations, Lachlan was offered on loan for an initial time of three years and on 31 May 1949 was paid off from RAN service and was immediately given to the Royal New Zealand Navy the next day. Following trials through September 1949, on 5 October 1949 HMNZS Lachlan was commissioned into the Royal New Zealand Navy.

The ship was fully disarmed at the dockyard at HMNZS Philomel and the ship's chart room enlarged for surveying. The ship was rushed into service so quickly that some of the finishing touches were done at sea. Her first survey was started on 18 November 1949 surveying the Wellington Harbour entrance, taking three weeks to complete with assistance of a survey motor boat from Australia. To assist with the creation of the hydrographic service, on earlier voyages part of the ships company included personnel from the Royal Australian Navy and Royal Navy.

HMNZS Lachlan surveyed over fifty percent of New Zealand's coastline over her twenty years in commission. Some of her service included surveys in Australia and the rest of the Pacific, and she helped clear mines around the Gilbert & Ellice Islands from World War II. Her bow was damaged in a collision with the Napier wharf in October 1954. In 1963 the New Zealand government purchased the vessel for £16,000. By 1970, she was due to be decommissioned but in May 1970 the Royal New Zealand Navy was ordered by the government by an extra five years.

In 1975, HMNZS Lachlan was painted all grey and docked at HMNZS Philomel to house ship's companies whose frigates were undergoing refits. In September 1975, her engines were removed and sold, and in 1993 the hulk was sold to a Philippines company for scrapping.
