= Robert Bland =

British physician and obstetrician (1730–1816)

Robert Bland (1730–1816) was an English physician and man-midwife (obstetrician). He was physician to the London Dispensary.

== Biography ==
He was born the son of an attorney at King's Lynn. He was educated at London hospitals and was awarded at M. D. from St Andrew's University, Scotland, in 1778, and was licensed by the college of Physicians on 30 September 1786. In London he built up a considerable practice as an obstetrician and was invited to write all midwifery articles for Rees's Cyclopædia. The plates for these were suppressed.

Robert Bland died at Leicester Square, London on 29 June 1816.

== Family ==
His second son, William Bland, was a naval surgeon, and after killing a man in a duel was transported to Australia, where he became a politician.

His daughter Sophia married John Benjamin Heath, a governor of the Bank of England.

== Writings ==
- "Some calculation of accidents or deaths which happen in consequence of parturition, &c. taken from the midwifery reports of the Westminster Dispensary." (Phil. Trans, 1781, p 355)
- Observations on Human and Comparative Parturition, 1794
- Proverbs chiefly taken from the Adagia of Erasmus ..., 1814
