= HMS Porpoise (1798) =

1798 storeship

History

Great Britain
- Name: HMS Porpoise
- Ordered: 24 November 1797 (established)
- Builder: Hill & Mellish, Limehouse
- Launched: 16 May 1798
- Renamed: HMS Diligent (5 January 1799)
- Fate: Sold 1802

General characteristics
- Tons burthen: 324 (bm)
- Length: 96 ft 2 in (29.3 m) (overall); 76 ft 10 in (23.4 m) (keel)
- Beam: 28 ft 2 in (8.6 m)
- Depth of hold: 12 ft 0 in (3.7 m)
- Complement: 33
- Armament: 10 × 6-pounder guns; 12-pounder carronades later replaced some or all of the guns

HMS Porpoise was built as a storeship to a commercial design by John Henslow (Surveyor of the Navy), launched in 1798 and purchased by the Royal Navy. The Navy commissioned her in July 1798 under Lieutenant Walter Scott.

The ship was to carry a collection of trees and plants to Australia for Sir Joseph Banks and they were tended on board by George Suttor. A "garden cabin" 6 ft (1.8 m) by 12 ft (3.7 m) feet was built on the quarterdeck of the ship. After several abortive attempts to reach Australia the ship was condemned as unseaworthy, and the garden was transferred to the new HMS Porpoise.

The Navy renamed her Diligent in 1799 and sold her in 1802 at the end of the French Revolutionary Wars. Records in the National Maritime Museum for Diligent describe her as an "armed ship".
