= William Bland =

Australian politician

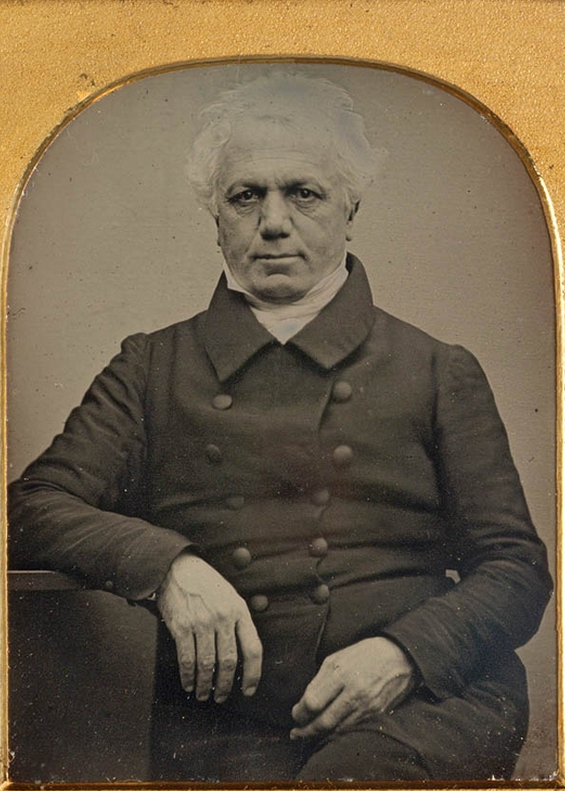
- Dr William Bland c. 1845, by George Barron Goodman – the oldest surviving photograph taken in Australia

Member of the New South Wales Legislative Council
- In office 24 March 1858 – 21 March 1861
- Constituency: None (nominated member)
- In office 1 December 1849 – 30 June 1850
- Preceded by: Robert Lowe
- Succeeded by: John Dunmore Lang
- Constituency: City of Sydney
- In office 1 June 1843 – 20 June 1848
- Preceded by: New seat
- Succeeded by: Robert Lowe
- Constituency: City of Sydney

Personal details
- Born: 5 November 1789 London, England
- Died: 21 July 1868 (aged 78) Sydney, New South Wales
- Spouses: Sarah Henry (m. 1817; died 1840) Eliza Smeathman (m. 1846)
- Parent: Robert Bland (father)
- Relatives: John Benjamin Heath (brother-in-law)
- Occupation: Surgeon
- Criminal charge: Murder
- Criminal penalty: Transportation

William Bland (5 November 1789 – 21 July 1868) was a prominent public figure in the colony of New South Wales. A surgeon by profession, he arrived in Australia as a convict but played an important role in the early years of Australian healthcare, education and science.

Bland was born in London and became a surgeon in the Royal Navy, serving on the East Indies Station. He was convicted of murder in 1813 after killing a crewmate in a duel in Bombay. He was sentenced to penal transportation, initially to Van Diemen's Land and then to New South Wales, where he was assigned to work at the Castle Hill Lunatic Asylum. He received a pardon in 1815 owing to the lack of qualified medical practitioners in the colony.

As one of the few surgeons in New South Wales, Bland practised medicine in Sydney for over 50 years. He developed new surgical techniques and improvised surgical instruments, publishing papers in The Lancet and later in the Australian Medical Journal. He was the founding president of the Australian Medical Association in 1859 and worked with the Benevolent Society. Outside of medicine Bland was a co-founder of the Sydney Mechanics' School of Arts and served terms as treasurer and president of Sydney College, a forerunner to the University of Sydney. He was also an inventor, receiving a patent for a fire suppression device and designing an experimental steam-powered airship.

Bland became politically active shortly after his arrival in New South Wales and in 1818 was sentenced to a year in prison for libelling Governor Lachlan Macquarie. He aligned himself with other emancipists and supported William Wentworth's calls for representative government and expanded civil rights for ex-convicts. Along with Wentworth and fellow former surgeon John Jamison, he was a key figure in the creation of the Australian Patriotic Association in 1835. Following constitutional reform, in 1843 Bland became one of the first elected members of the New South Wales Legislative Council. He served multiple terms in parliament where he supported land reform and opposed the interests of the Squattocracy.

Bland was granted a state funeral upon his death in 1868. He is the namesake of Bland Shire and the former Division of Bland in federal parliament.

== Early life ==
Bland was born in London on 5 November 1789. He was the second son of Robert Bland, an obstetrician who wrote for Rees's Cyclopædia. His grandfather Robert Bland was an attorney-at-law at King's Lynn. The identity of Bland's mother is uncertain. He had at least three siblings, an older brother and two sisters. His brother Robert was a clergyman, poet and teacher at Harrow School, while his sister Sophia married John Benjamin Heath, a governor of the Bank of England.

Bland was likely to have been educated at a public school, possibly at the Merchant Taylors' School, Northwood. He followed his father into the medical profession and may have served as his apprentice. In January 1809, he qualified for entry into the Royal Navy's medical service as a "surgeon's mate" after passing the examination conducted by the Royal College of Surgeons of England. He was promoted to naval surgeon in 1812 and was stationed aboard HMS Hesper on the East Indies Station.

=== Murder conviction ===
On 7 April 1813, Bland shot and killed Robert Case, the ship's purser on Hesper, in a duel on Cross Island in Bombay Harbour. The duel stemmed from a disagreement between Case and William Randall, the ship's first lieutenant. According to contemporary accounts in the Bombay Courier, Case initially challenged Randall to a duel, which Bland tried to prevent. A few days later, Case continued to make remarks about Randall, who was absent, and was defended by Bland. Case then called Bland a "contemptible fellow", to which Bland responded by throwing a drinking glass at him; Case subsequently challenged Bland to a duel with pistols.

Bland and the three other surviving participants in the duel were charged with "wilful murder" and gaoled by the Recorder's Court of the Bombay Presidency. Only he and Randall – who had served as his second – were brought to trial. Bland mounted a defence of honour, stating that to refuse Case's challenge would have "doomed me to a punishment worse than death" and that he had no intention of actually killing the man. The Recorder did not accept the argument, finding that the killing was premeditated and advising the jury to find the defendants guilty. The jury accepted the instruction but recommended mercy. Both defendants were given sentences of transportation; Bland received the minimum sentence of seven years while Randall was given eight years as he was judged to have played a greater part in the circumstances surrounding the duel.

== Australia ==
Bland arrived in Hobart as a convict in January 1814, transported with his co-offender Randall. Despite their status as criminals, they were invited to dine with senior army officers and invited to Government House by Lieutenant-Governor Thomas Davey, of whom Bland stated that he was "fortunate enough to obtain the steady and firm friendship". An account of Davey's actions was passed on to Lachlan Macquarie, the newly appointed governor of New South Wales, who stated that he had committed a "very great irregularity" in receiving the convicts.

In June 1814, Bland was sent on to Sydney. He was almost immediately granted his freedom by Macquarie and in September 1814 was appointed as the medical superintendent of the Castle Hill Lunatic Asylum. He was also granted some nearby government land for his own use. The appointment of convicts to government positions was not uncommon at the time due to a shortage of qualified individuals; the colony's principal surgeon D'Arcy Wentworth and assistant surgeon William Redfern were also ex-convicts. Bland received a full pardon on 27 January 1815.

In 1818 he wrote "pipes" (anonymous and variously insulting satires) criticising Governor Macquarie's treatment of farmers, and making fun of his desire to have his name on foundation stones; the Governor was not amused. Bland's handwriting was recognised and on Thursday 24 and Friday 25 September 1818 he was in court and convicted of libel fined £50/-/-d and sentenced to 12 months imprisonment which he served at Parramatta.

=== Philanthropy ===
In 1825 his committee founded Sydney Public Free Grammar School.

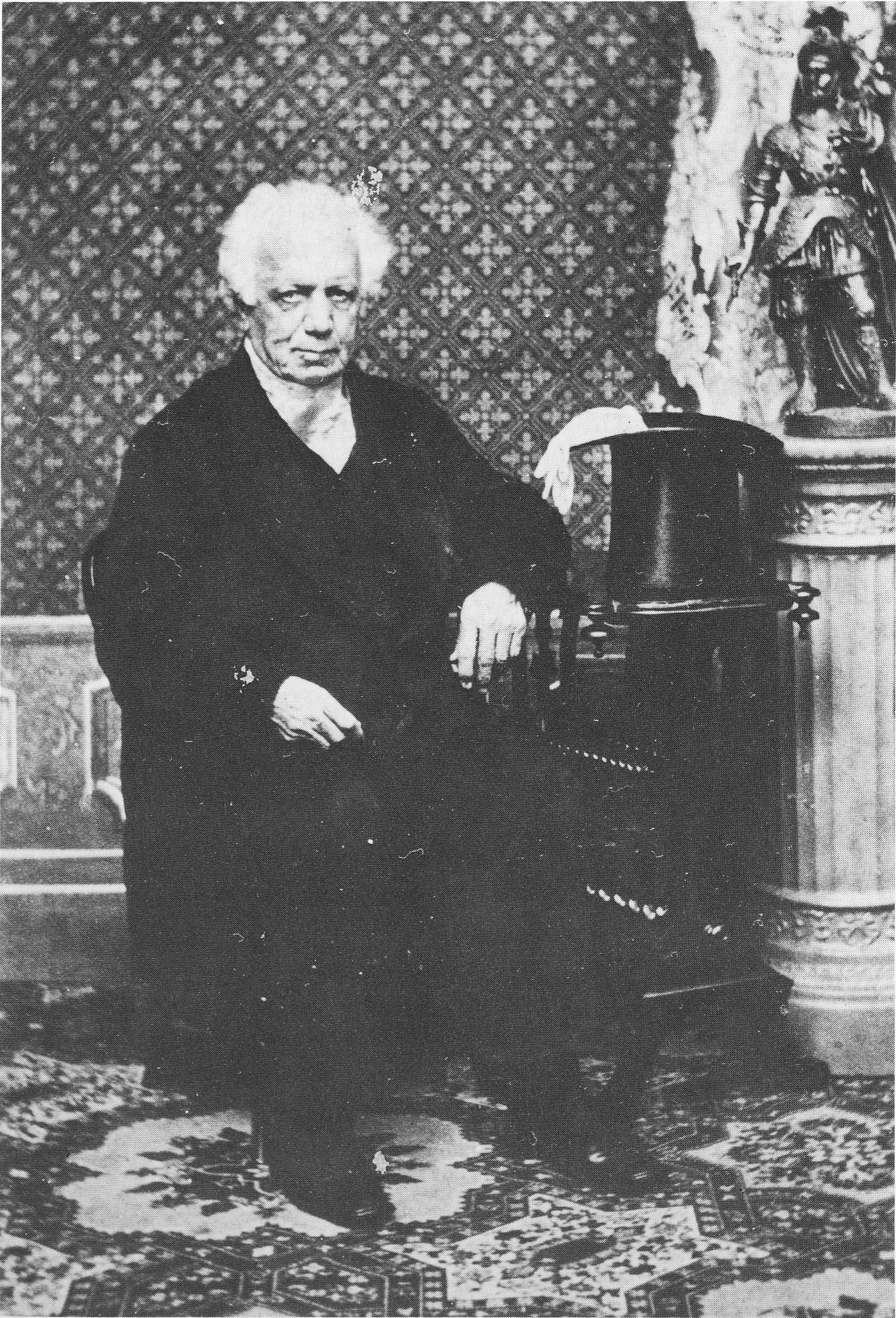
Dr William Bland

Flag used by Bland and William Wentworth as candidates for the Legislative Council

=== Politics ===
In 1839 he contributed funds and land to the building of St John's Ashfield.

During 1839–1841, Bland wrote letters for Australian Patriotic Association (emancipists), which now show the constitutional struggles towards autonomy. Bland, as secretary to the association, helped draft two bills for a "representative constitution", which was approved in 1842 with Bland representing Sydney at its reading and approval passages.

Bland was an elected member of the NSW Legislative Council twice (1843–1848, 1849–1850) for the City of Sydney and after the introduction of responsible government was appointed to the NSW Legislative Council (1858–1861).

In 1849 Wentworth introduced a bill into the Legislature to create the University of Sydney, naming Bland as one of its first senators, but Robert Lowe raised Bland's criminal record and the 1813 duel, and the bill failed. Bland challenged Lowe to a duel but Lowe avoided it. Bland's name was not included on the bill that was eventually passed.

=== Inventions ===
In 1843, Bland claimed that J. R. Hancorn had laid claim to an invention of his, the means for the prevention of spontaneous combustion, which he claimed to have invented in 1839.

In approximately 1845, he was the subject of the oldest surviving photograph taken in Australia, held by the Mitchell Library, State Library of New South Wales.

=== Atmotic airship ===
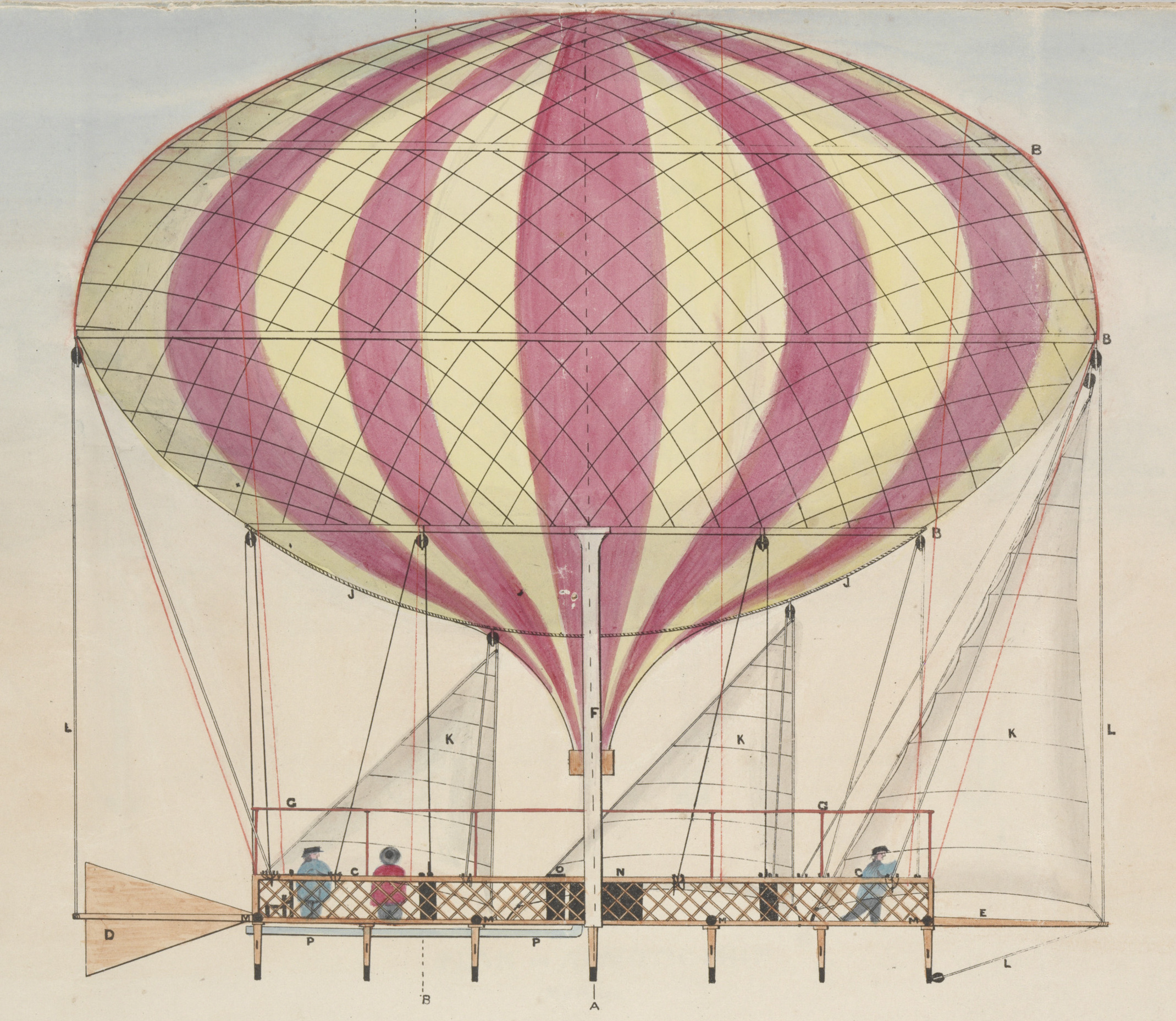
View of the Atmotic Ship illustrated by W. Louis Hutton

The Atmotic Ship was an experimental steam-powered airship designed in 1851 by Bland. No prototype was ever constructed. According to Bland, the idea for the Atmotic Ship came to him in March 1851. He may have been inspired by reports on ballooning carried in The Sydney Morning Herald, which drew attention to the problem of managing ascents and descents and navigating through the air. Additionally, he had previously corresponded with Francis Forbes, the son of Chief Justice Sir Francis Forbes, who had in 1843 put forward a proposal for an "aerial carriage" based on a steam-powered kite.

Illustrations of the Atmotic Ship

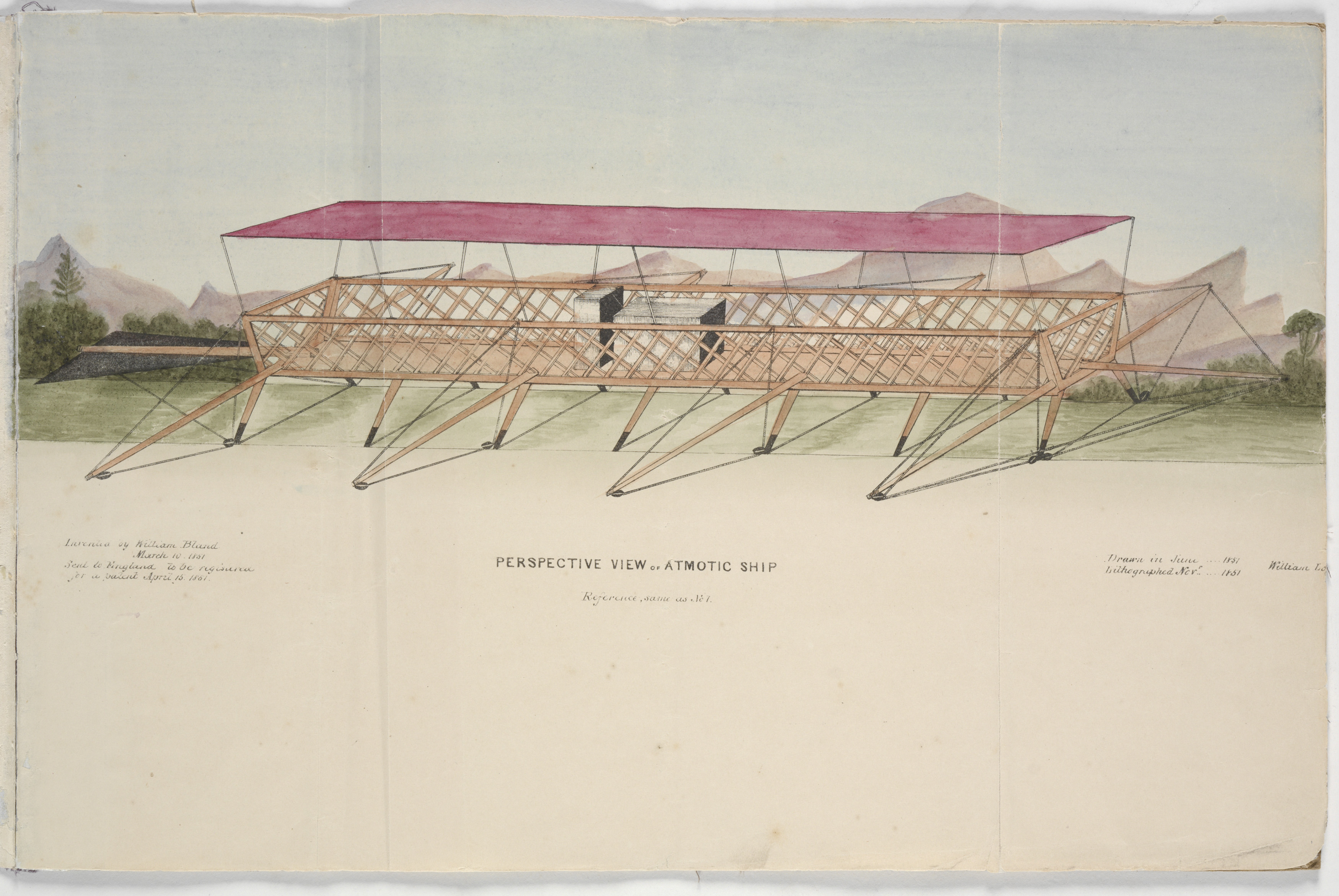
Prior to inflation

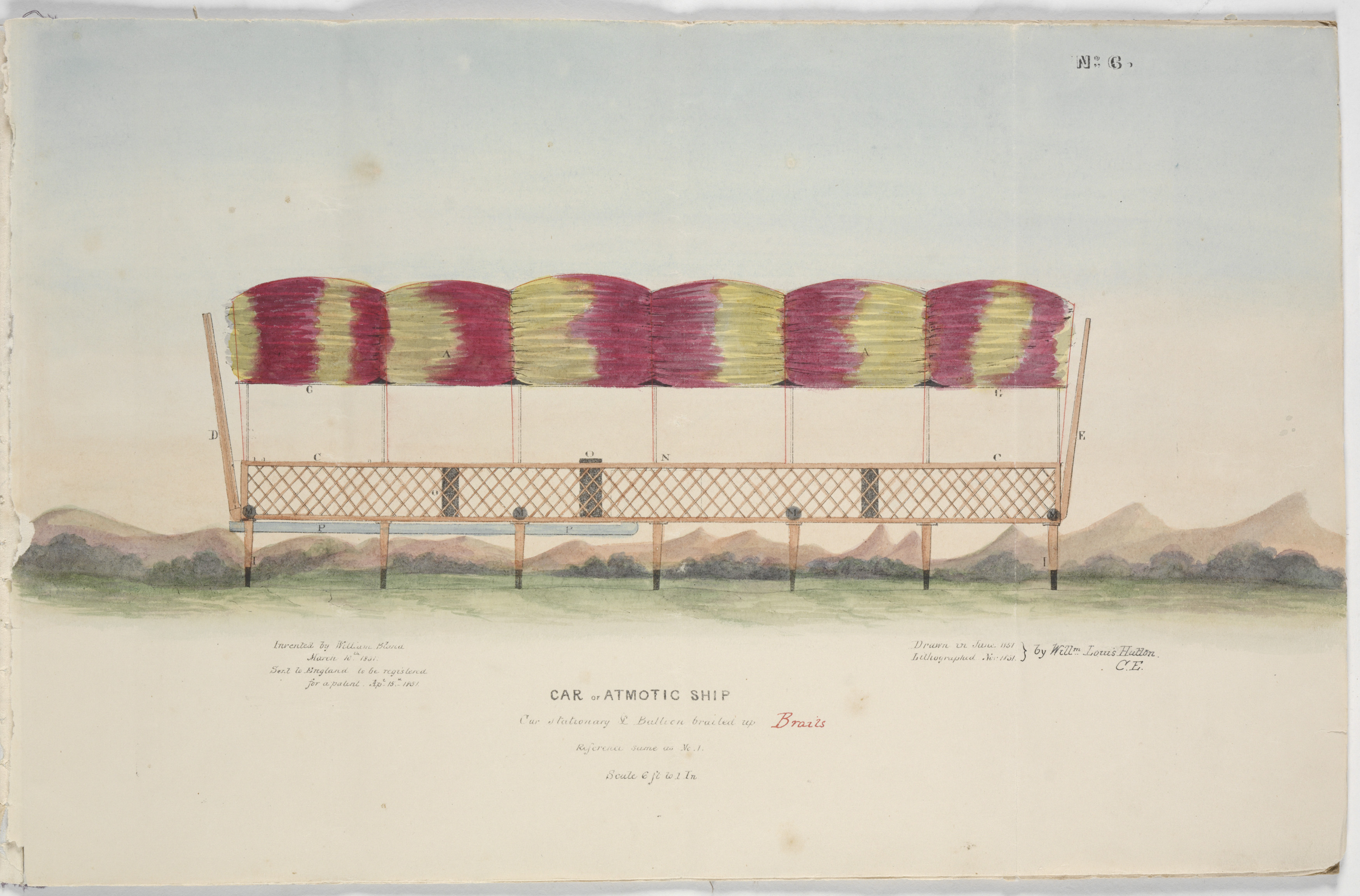
During inflation

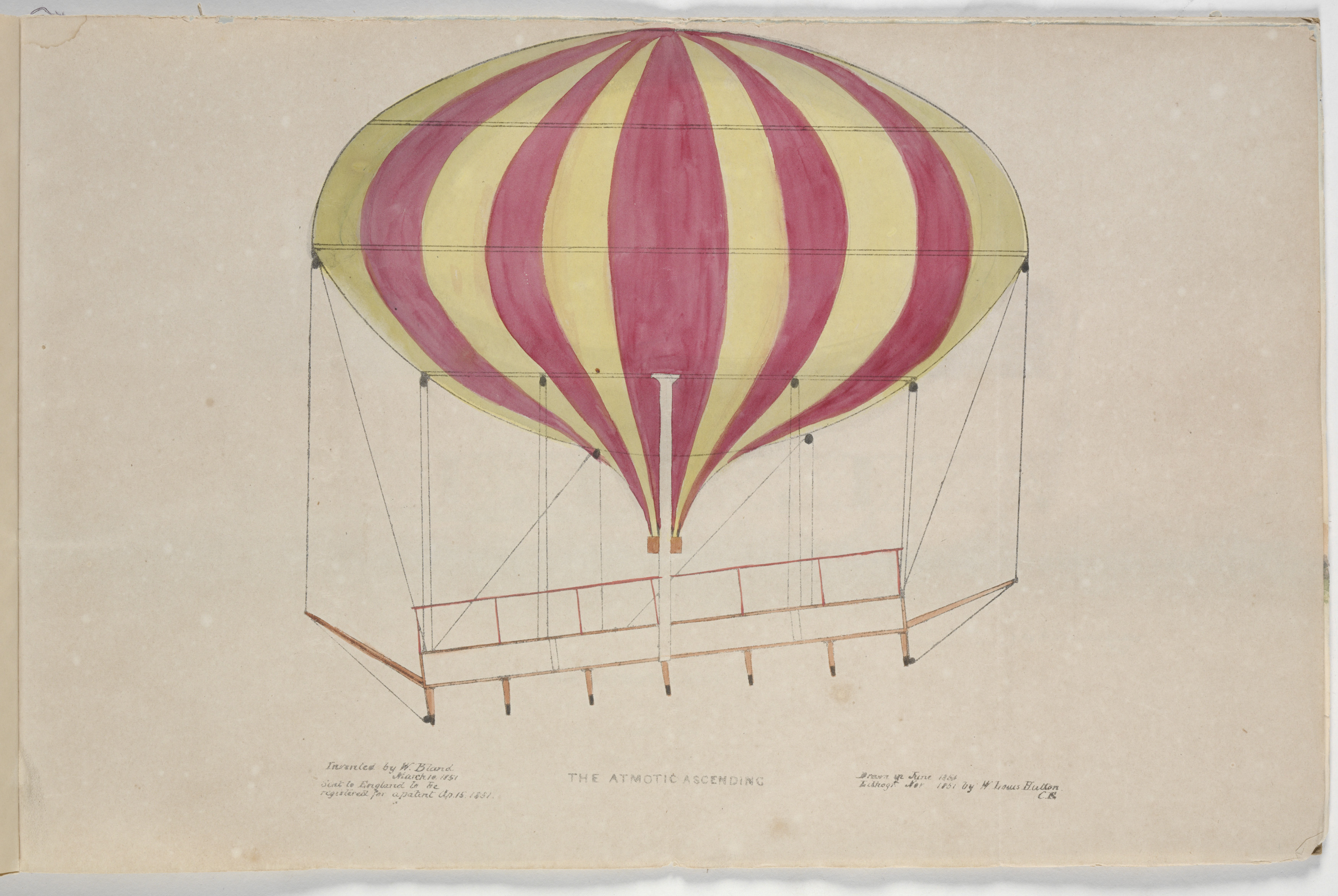
Ascending

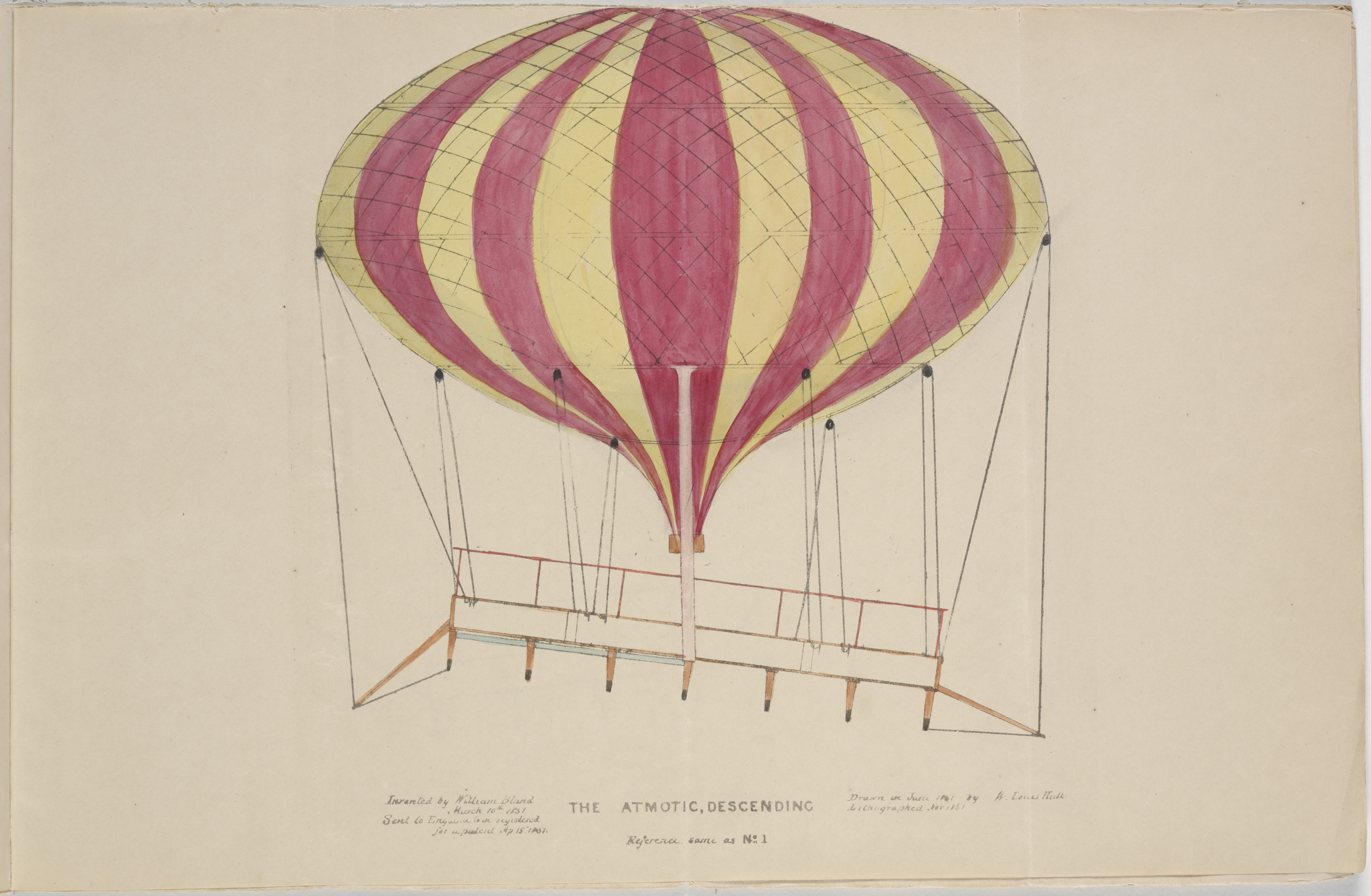
Descending

Bland sought to put forward a solution to the problem of managing ascents and descents that did not require releasing gas or jettisoning ballast. He proposed that the gondola or "car" be fitted with "sliding ballast", which the operator would move to the front, back or centre of the airship to effect an ascent or descent.

In June 1859, Bland gave an address to the Royal Society of New South Wales titled "On Atmotic Navigation", which was one of the first lectures on aviation in Australia.

Bland continued to lobby for the Ship to be trialled up until his death in 1868. He wrote letters to U.S. President Abraham Lincoln, King Victor Emmanuel II of Italy, and Tsar Alexander II of Russia, and proposed to the Colonial Office that the first Ship to be constructed should be named in honour of Queen Victoria. In 1866, Bland sent copies of his pamphlet to George Campbell, 8th Duke of Argyll, the president of the newly formed Aeronautical Society of Great Britain, requesting that the Ship be given a trial. The Duke of Argyll declined on the grounds that he believed aerial navigation would only be possible with a flying machine that was heavier than air, noting that no "flying animal is lighter than air". The following year, Bland was finally granted a patent for his fire suppression device. He proposed that the patent be sold and the future rights to the patent for the Atmotic Ship be sold for £2,000 (equivalent to $320,000 in 2022).

=== Later life ===
Bland continued in active medical practice until 1868. In 1863-4 he conducted correspondence with Father Therry on the best way to construct a transatlantic telegraph cable.

He died intestate in Sydney on 21 July 1868 of pneumonia, and was accorded a State Funeral.

== Personal life ==
In April 1817, Bland married Sarah Henry, the 20-year-old daughter of William Henry of the London Missionary Society. Henry had previously lived in Tahiti, where her father was a missionary, and was sent to Sydney after falling in love with a Tahitian chief. She was later engaged to Thomas Hassall, the son of another missionary, before beginning a relationship with Bland. Their wedding at St Philip's Church was officiated by William Cowper.

Only a few months into his first marriage, Bland discovered that his wife had committed adultery with Richard Drake, an East India Company officer. He initially sought a duel with Drake, who went into hiding and eventually fled the colony. He then sued Drake for "criminal conversation" and was awarded damages of £2,000 (equivalent to £150,000 in 2025), although he probably never received any money. Bland placed an advertisement in the Sydney Gazette "cautioning the public" against extending any credit to his wife. They remained legally married after their separation and he provided maintenance of £50 per year (equivalent to £3,700 in 2025) until her death in England in about 1840.

After separating from his first wife, Bland lived in a two-storey house in Pitt Street, retaining several convict servants and occasionally taking on boarders. He had a collection of pets which included a spaniel, a one-eyed magpie, a cockatoo and several snakes. In February 1846, Bland married Eliza Smeathman, the widow of his close friend Charles Smeathman who had frequently acted as coroner.

== Legacy ==
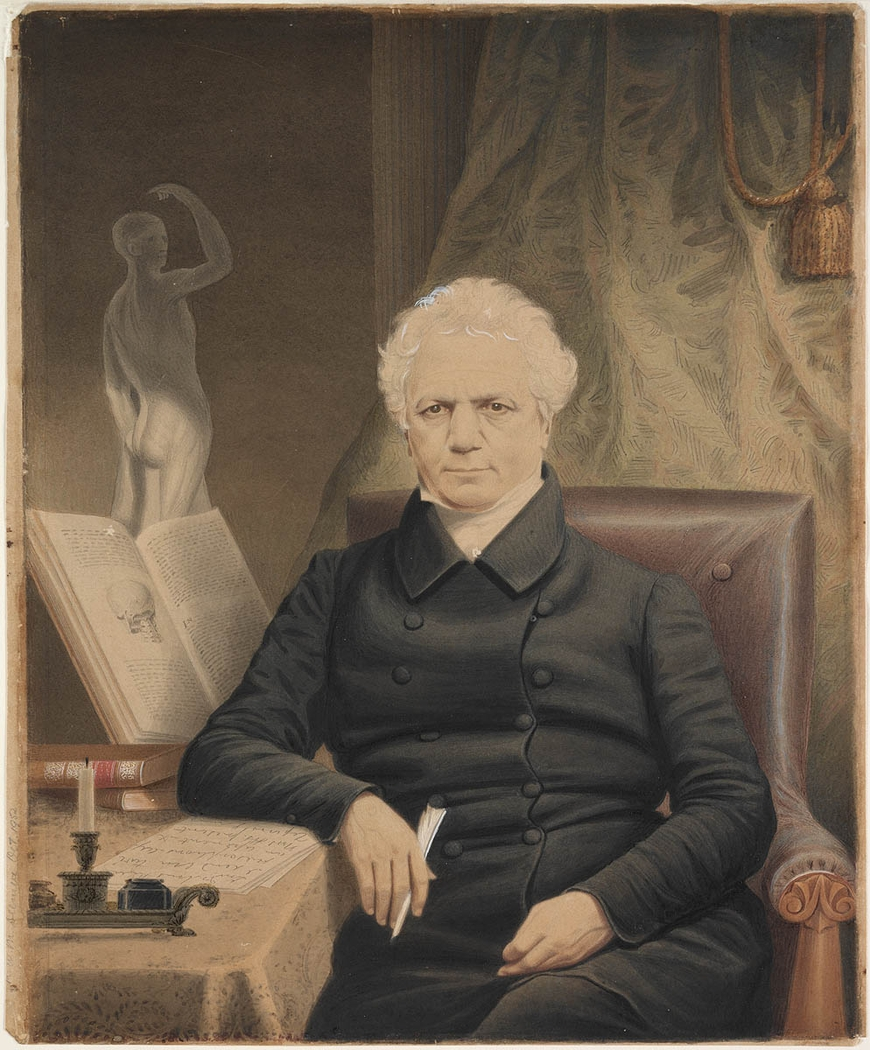
Watercolour drawing by Richard Read Sr.

Bland County, New South Wales was named in his honour.

An electoral division in the first federal parliament, the Division of Bland, was named after him. This division was abolished in 1906.

Bland is also commemorated in the name of Bland Shire Council and Bland Street in suburban Ashfield and Haberfield where he purchased land in 1839. Bland Street and the Bland Oak in Oakdene Park, Carramar, New South Wales are located what was known as the Mark Lodge estate, acquired by Bland in 1840.

In honour of Dr William Bland's contribution to medical practice within early Australia, a twelve level building opposite Sydney Hospital at 229–231 Macquarie Street, Sydney was built in 1960 and named the William Bland Centre. It predominantly houses private medical practices such as Physiotherapy Clinic mySydneyPhysio, addressing the health needs of Sydney's CBD workforce.

A public housing building, Blandville Court, on Victoria Road at Gladesville is named after the early name of the nearby suburb of Henley, which was originally called Blandville after Bland.

== See also ==
- List of convicts transported to Australia
- Photography in Australia

New South Wales Legislative Council
New creation	Member for City of Sydney; Jun 1843 – Jun 1848; With: William Wentworth	Succeeded by Robert Lowe
Preceded by Robert Lowe	Member for City of Sydney; Dec 1849 – Jun 1850; With: William Wentworth	Succeeded by John Dunmore Lang
Unknown	Nominated Member; 24 Mar 1858 – 21 Mar 1861	Unknown
