= Castle Hill Lunatic Asylum =

Defunct psychiatric facility

Castle Hill Lunatic Asylum was Australia's first official institution which provided care for the mentally ill. It was located approximately 7 miles (11 km) north of Parramatta in New South Wales. Established by Lachlan Macquarie in May 1811, it operated until 1826. It was housed in a two-storey stone building, previously a granary, which also served as a barracks at one time.

George Suttor, farmer and pioneer settler, was superintendent of the lunatic asylum from August 1814 to February 1819, when he was dismissed on charges of using lunatic labour on his farm.

Former naval surgeon William Bland – a convicted murderer – was a physician at the asylum from 1814 until he received a pardon in 1815.
