= George Suttor =

Anglo-Scottish farmer and Australian settler

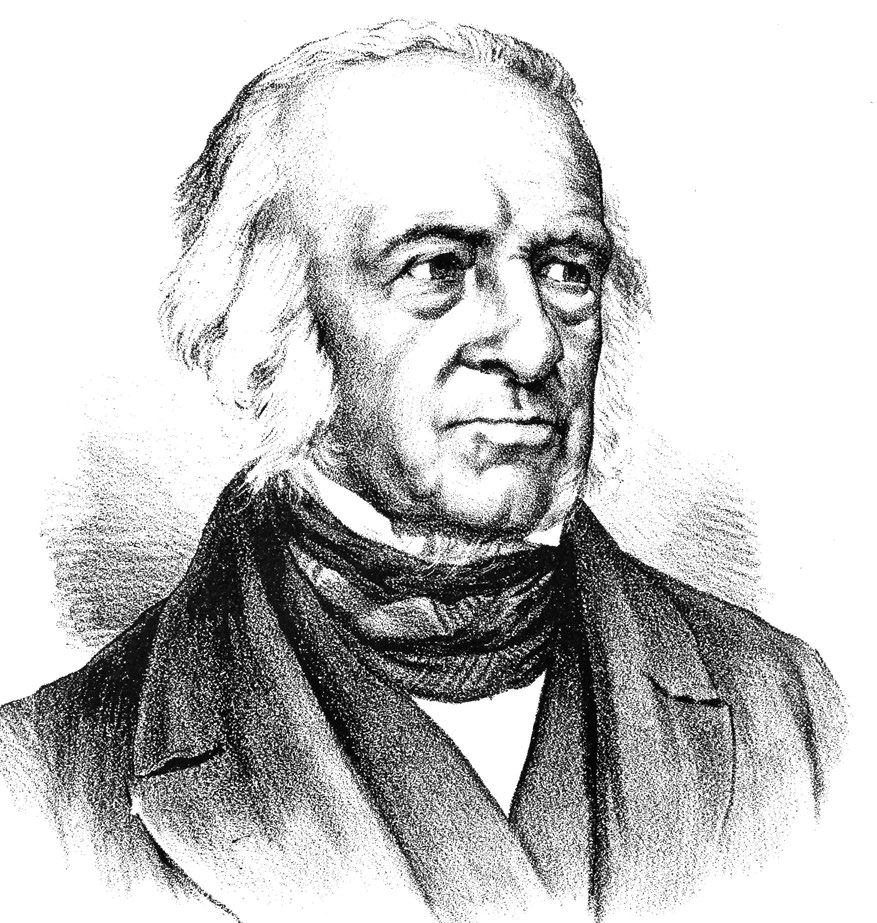

George Suttor (11 June 1774 – 5 May 1858) was an Anglo-Scottish farmer and pioneer settler of Australia, who is notable as the founder of a significant Australian family, and also as a supporter of Captain Bligh following the 1808 Rebellion at Sydney, New South Wales.

== Early life ==
Suttor was born in Chelsea, London, England, the third son of a Scottish market gardener (and botanist on the estate of Charles Cadogan, 2nd Baron Cadogan) and his wife, née Thomas. Suttor, through contacts of his father, gained an interview with Sir Joseph Banks who sent Suttor to Australia with a collection of trees and plants including grapevines, apples, pears, and hops. These were put on board HMS Porpoise in October 1798, but delays took place and it was not until September 1799 that a proper start was made. A gale almost wrecked the ship, which was found to be unseaworthy, and a return was made to Spithead. In March 1800 another start was made on a corvette taken from the Spanish and renamed HMS Porpoise and arrived in Sydney in November 1800.

== Australia ==
Suttor arrived at Sydney on 5 November 1800. In spite of the delays, Suttor managed to land some of his trees and vines still alive. He was given a grant of land, and settled at Chelsea Farm, Baulkham Hills. In a few years time he was sending oranges and lemons to Sydney, obtaining good prices for them, and had become a successful settler.

At the time of the William Bligh rebellion in 1808, Suttor was a firm supporter of the deposed governor. When Colonel Paterson arrived, Suttor's was the first signature to an address presented to him promising to give him

every information and support in our power in order that full satisfaction and justice may be given to the governor (whom we highly revere) . . . we cannot but feel the most confidant reliance that you will take prompt and effectual means to secure the principals in this most unjustifiable transaction.

Suttor was, however, arrested and sentenced to be imprisoned for six months for failing to attend Lieutenant-Governor Joseph Foveaux's general muster and for impugning his authority. The stand taken by Suttor was much to his honour; a full account of it will be found in the Historical Records of Australia, vol. VII, pp. 131–7. Suttor always spoke of Bligh as a "firm and kind-hearted English gentleman, no tyrant and no coward" (W. H. Suttor, Australian Stories Retold, p. 6). In 1810 Suttor was summoned to England as a witness on behalf of Bligh, and arrived in Australia again in May 1812. In August 1814 Suttor was given the position of superintendent of the lunatic asylum at Castle Hill with a salary of £50; in February 1819 he was dismissed from this position on charges he used lunatic labour on his farm.

Suttor again took up land, and in 1822 he moved to beyond the Blue Mountains to the newly settled lands on the Bathurst plains. There he established the 130 hectares (320 acres) 'Brucedale Station' at the junction of Winburndale and Clear Creeks, which turned out to be a successful landholding leading to great prosperity, and by the 1830s it had been expanded to 4,055 hectares (10,020 acres). During a time of great conflict with the Indigenous Australians of the Wiradjuri nation, who resisted the taking of their lands, Suttor and his family (in particular son William) established good relations with the local Indigenous peoples. They were known to have been close to the Wiradjuri's warrior leader Windradyne, and when Windradyne died he was buried at Brucedale.

Nine years later Suttor was living on the Baulkham Hills property, and he also built a house at Sydney. Suttor visited England and Europe in 1839–45 and was elected a fellow of the Linnean Society of London.

Suttor published a volume on The Culture of the Grape-Vine and the Orange in Australia and New Zealand (1843), and the Memoirs Historical and Scientific of the Right Honourable Sir Joseph Banks (1855, reprinted 1948).

Suttor married Miss Sarah Maria Dobinson (his childhood sweetheart) in 1798 and founded a distinguished Australian family. He died at Bathurst on 5 May 1859; Mrs Suttor had died in 1844, but five sons and three daughters survived their father.

A park in Baulkham Hills is named after him.

== Descendants ==
- George Banks Suttor (1799–1879), born on the Porpoise at Spithead.
- Eliza Maria Suttor (1801–1889)
- Thomas Charles Cadogan Suttor (1804–1889)
- William Henry Suttor (1805–1877) member of the New South Wales Legislative Council 1843–1854, and of the Legislative Assembly 1856–72
  - Grandson: William Henry Suttor (junior) (1834–1905), entered the Legislative Assembly in January 1875; in 1889 became Vice-President of the Executive Council
  - Grandson: Sir Francis Bathurst Suttor (1839–1915).
- Cordelia Sarah Suttor (1806–1894)
- John Bligh Suttor (1809–1886), who for some years represented East Macquarie in the Legislative Assembly, and at the time of his death was a member of the Legislative Council.
- Sarah Ellen Suttor (1813–1901)
- Elizabeth Mary Suttor (1815–1862)
- Edwin Clark Suttor (1818–1896)
- Timothy Suttor (1926–1997) Historian
