= Thomas Allen (captain) =

- Born: c. 1816
- Died: 14 September 1885 (age 69); Queenstown, South Australia
- Resting place: Woodville Cemetery
- Occupation: Sailing ship captain
- Known for: Captain of the last ship to carry convicts from South Australia to Van Diemen's Land
- Spouse: Sarah Ann Galway (m. 1850)

Thomas Allen (c. 1816–1885) was a sea captain based in Port Adelaide.

Allen was known for having been the captain of the last ship to carry convicts from South Australia to the prison colony in Van Diemen's Land.

A previous ship carrying convicts, the Lady Denison had not arrived at its destination. Allen took extra precautions to ensure the safety of his ship, the brig Punch, carrying prisoners, police and paying passengers. One of the paying passengers was the wife of one of the prisoners.

The ship departed Port Adelaide on 13 June 1850, and arrived in good order at Hobart Town on 25 June. It had on board nine male and three female prisoners, escorted by four Adelaide police, and eleven passengers (including five children).

Descriptions of exactly what happened on the voyage vary in details. By either account, the convicts had planned an escape and mutiny, using tools and equipment shipped on board in a locked chest.

Allen was a County Cork Irishman who had arrived in South Australia as ship's mate on the brig Elizabeth Buckham in 1843. At age 32, he married 21-year-old Sarah Ann Galway of Port Adelaide in 1850 at Holy Trinity Church, Adelaide. She accompanied him on voyages around Australia and South East Asia on the brigs Punch and Empress and schooner Swallow until he retired from sailing in 1875. He was also later part-owner of the Schah Jehan.

Their children were born on board, or at ports where they called, and travelled with them.

- Patrick (died 6 June 1855, aged 4, buried West Terrace Cemetery Catholic section, Adelaide)
- (son buried Singapore)
- Sarah Ann, aged 5 days, buried at Alberton Cemetery, Adelaide on 14 March 1855
- Marmion Allen (1857–1860, buried in Melbourne)
- Thomas Maurice (Tom) Allen (18 December 1859 – March 1912), died when the ship he skippered, the SS Koombana was caught in a cyclone and lost with all hands.
- Seaborn C. R. Allen (29 April 1862 – 22 June 1931) born on the Sehah Jehan off Cape Northumberland)

Allen died at his home in Queenstown near Port Adelaide in 1885 and was buried at the Woodville Cemetery.
