= HMAS Grantala =

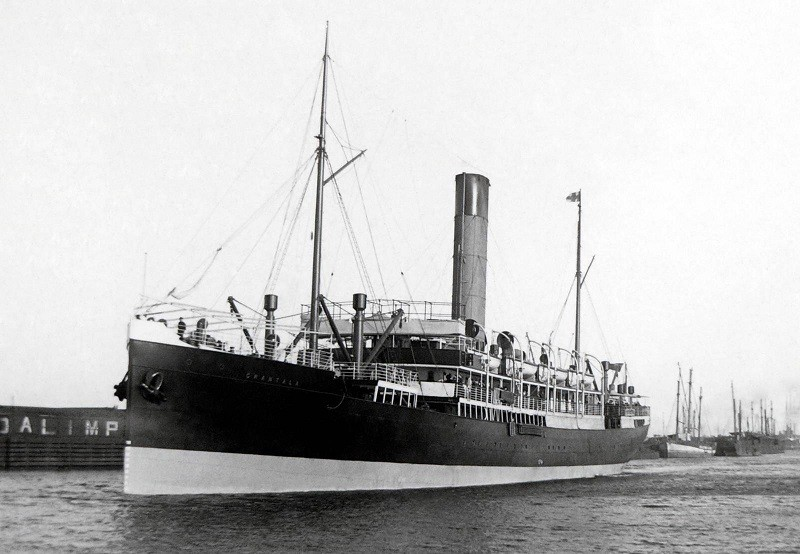
- Grantala before the First World War

History
- Name: 1903: Grantala; 1917: Figuig
- Namesake: 1917: Figuig
- Owner: 1903: Adelaide Steamship Co; 1915: Red Funnel Shipping Co; 1921: Cie Gle Transatlantique
- Operator: 1914: (United Kingdom) Royal Australian Navy; 1915: Cie Gle Transatlantique
- Port of registry: 1903: (Australia) Port Adelaide; 1915: (United Kingdom) London; 1921: (France) Bordeaux
- Builder: Armstrong, Whitworth & Co, Low Walker
- Yard number: 737
- Launched: 28 May 1903
- Completed: December 1903
- Acquired: For RAN: 7 August 1914
- Decommissioned: From RAN: 22 December 1914
- Identification: 1903: UK official number 118370; 1903: code letters VMHP; 1914: call sign VHJ; 1920: code letters OHED
- Honours and awards: Rabaul 1914
- Fate: Scrapped, 1934

General characteristics
- Type: Passenger ship
- Tonnage: 3,655 GRT, 1,787 NRT
- Length: 350.0 ft (106.7 m)
- Beam: 45.2 ft (13.8 m)
- Depth: 27.2 ft (8.3 m)
- Decks: 2
- Installed power: 690 NHP
- Propulsion: 1 × screw; 1 × triple expansion engine
- Speed: 16 knots (30 km/h)
- Capacity: Passengers: 110 first class; 180 second class
- Notes: sister ship: Yongala

HMAS Grantala was a passenger steamship that was built in England in 1903 as a coastal interstate liner for the Adelaide Steamship Company. In 1914 the Commonwealth government requisitioned her as a Royal Australian Navy hospital ship.

Compagnie Générale Transatlantique's British subsidiary, the Red Funnel Shipping Co, bought Grantala in 1915, and renamed her Figuig in 1917. She was transferred to the French parent company in 1920. She was scrapped in Italy in 1934.

Grantala was the sister ship of Yongala, which was lost with all hands off the Queensland coast in 1911, and is now a notable wreck diving site.

== Building and identification ==
In 1903 Sir WG Armstrong, Whitworth & Co built a pair of passenger and cargo steamships at its Low Walker shipyard on the River Tyne for the Adelaide Steamship Co. Yongala was built as yard number 736, launched on 29 April 1903, and completed that October. Her sister ship Grantala was yard number 737, launched on 28 May 1903, and completed that December.

Grantala's registered length was 350.0 ft (106.7 m), her beam was 45.2 ft (13.8 m) and her depth was 27.2 ft (8.3 m). Her tonnages were 3,655 GRT and 1,787 NRT. She had a single screw, driven by a three-cylinder triple expansion engine built by the Wallsend Slipway Company. It was rated at 690 NHP, and on her sea trials on 31 December 1903 she achieved 16 knots (30 km/h). She had accommodation for 110 first class and 180 second class passengers.

The Adelaide Steamship Co registered Grantala at Port Adelaide. Her UK official number was 118370 and her code letters were VMHP.

== Australian service ==
On 21 January 1904 Grantala left Southampton on her delivery voyage from England to Australia. She sailed via Cape Town and Durban, and reached Fremantle on 29 February. She continued via Adelaide and Melbourne, and reached Sydney on 10 March, carrying about 200 passengers from England and South Africa. She then immediately joined her sister Yongala on the Adelaide Steamship Co's interstate route between Sydney and Fremantle.

From 1908 until 1914, Grantala's route alternated seasonally. For part of the year she ran between Melbourne and Cooktown, Queensland, and the for remainder she worked her original route between Sydney and Fremantle.

By 1911 Grantala was equipped for wireless telegraphy, and by 1914 her call sign was VHJ.

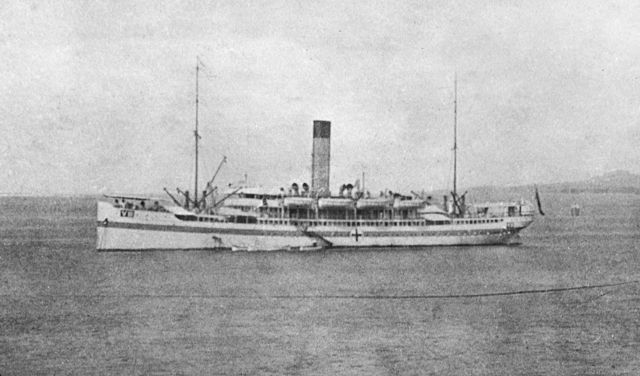
Grantala in hospital ship colours off Suva, Fiji in November 1914

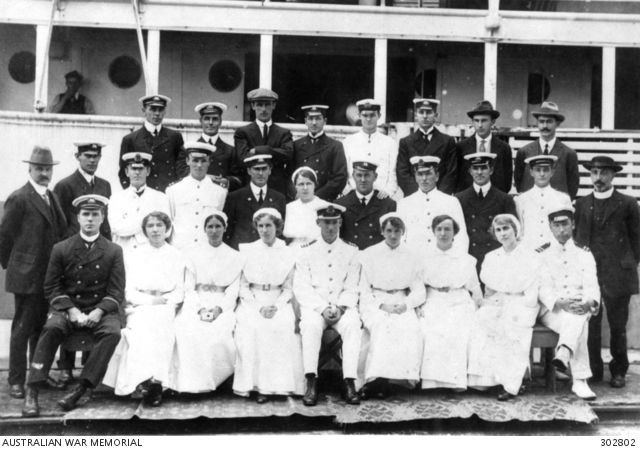
Medical staff on board in August 1914

On 4 August 1914 the UK entered the First World War, and three days later the RAN requisitioned Grantala. She was fitted out at Cockatoo Island Dockyard and Garden Island Naval Base as a hospital ship, with capacity for up to 300 patients, and 59 medical and nursing staff. The conversion was completed in 17 days. She was Australia's only hospital ship in the First World War.

On 30 August Grantala left Sydney to support the Australian Naval and Military Expeditionary Force landing at Rabaul in German New Guinea. She was later recognised with the battle honour "Rabaul 1914". However, Grantala proved too small for the purpose for which she had been requisitioned, so the RAN returned her to her owners at Sydney on 22 December.

== Red Funnel and CGT service ==
In November 1915 the Red Funnel Shipping Co Ltd bought Grantala at Sydney. This company was a UK subsidiary that the French Compagnie Générale Transatlantique (CGT) established during the First World War. It should not be confused with the Southampton Isle of Wight and South of England Royal Mail Steam Packet Co Ltd, which trades as "Red Funnel". Grantala left Sydney on 4 December 1915, sailed via Fremantle and Cape Town, and reached Naples in Italy on 25 February 1916.

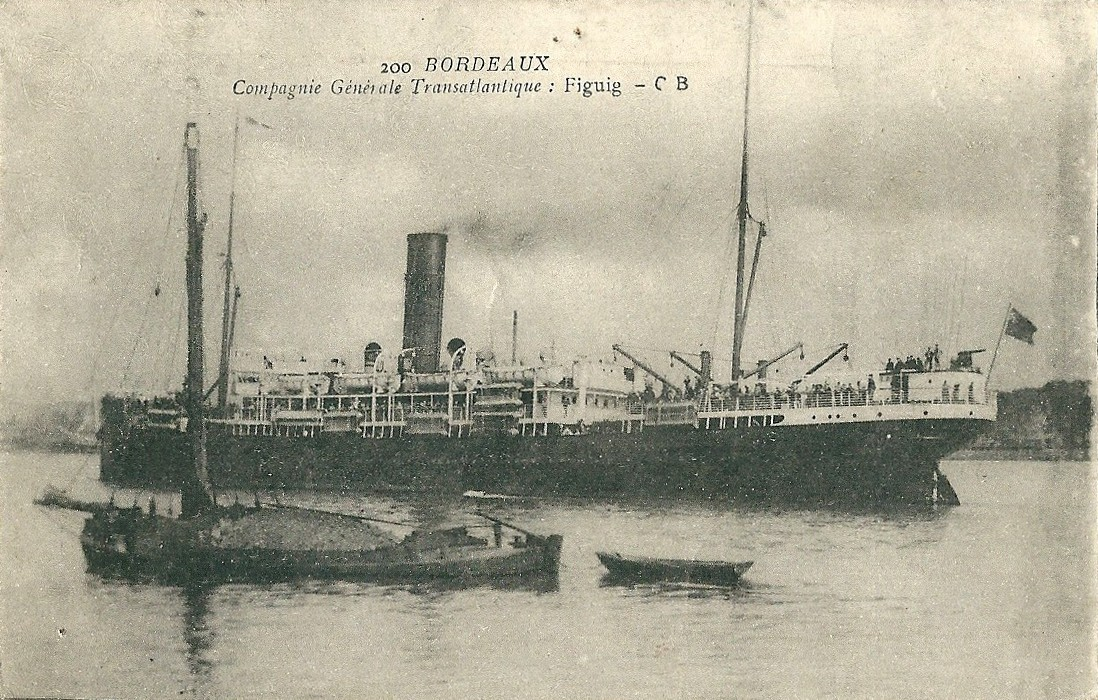
Figuig at Bordeaux

Red Funnel registered Grantala in London, but CGT managed her. By 1917 she was renamed Figuig, after the town of Figuig in Morocco. CGT ran her between Bordeaux and Casablanca.

On 18 July 1921 Figuig was transferred to the direct ownership of CGT, who re-registered her at Bordeaux. Her French code letters were OHED.

Her regular route was across the Mediterranean between Marseille and Algiers.

Figuig was scrapped in the second quarter of 1934 at Genoa in Italy.

== Bibliography ==
- Goyne, Rohan (March 2014). "HMAS Grantala – Australia's First Hospital Ship". Sabretache. LV (1). Garran, Australian Capital Territory: Military Historical Society of Australia: 28–31. ISSN 0048-8933.
- Lloyd's Register of British and Foreign Shipping. Vol. I.–Steamers. London: Lloyd's Register. 1904 – via Internet Archive.
- Lloyd's Register of British and Foreign Shipping. Vol. I.–Steamers. London: Lloyd's Register. 1911 – via Internet Archive.
- Lloyd's Register of Shipping. Vol. II.–Steamers. London: Lloyd's Register. 1921 – via Internet Archive.
- Lloyd's Register of Shipping (PDF). Vol. II.–Steamers and Motorships. London: Lloyd's Register. 1934 – via Southampton City Council.
- The Marconi Press Agency Ltd (1914). The Year Book of Wireless Telegraphy and Telephony. London: The Marconi Press Agency Ltd.
- Mercantile Navy List. London. 1906 – via Crew List Index Project.
- Mercantile Navy List. London. 1917 – via Crew List Index Project.
- Sauvaget, R (June 2009). "Ligne Bordeaux–Casablanca :le Figuig et le Volubilis" (PDF). French Lines (in French). No. 63.
- Wilson, Michael (1999). Royal Australian Navy 21st Century Warships, Naval auxiliaries 1911 to 1999 including Defence Maritime Services, Profile No. 4 (Revised ed.). Marrackville, NSW: Topmill. ISBN 978-1-876270-72-8.
