= Timothy Suttor =

Catholic theologian

Timothy Lachlan Suttor (11 May 1926, New South Wales, Australia – 1997, Spain) was a Catholic theologian noted for his work editing Thomas Aquinas' Summa Theologiae, v.11 as well as his original book Hierarchy and democracy in Australia, 1788-1870 : the formation of Australian Catholicism, published in 1965.

After converting to Catholicism in his late teens and spending years studying for the priesthood under the Dominicans, Suttor changed course in 1955, married, and began a career as a Catholic academic. He was remembered by Australian poet Geoffrey Lehmann as something of a poet himself. Suttor moved to Canada in 1964 where he taught at the University of Toronto (1964–1968) and the University of Windsor (1968–1984). He died in Malaga, Spain in 1997.
