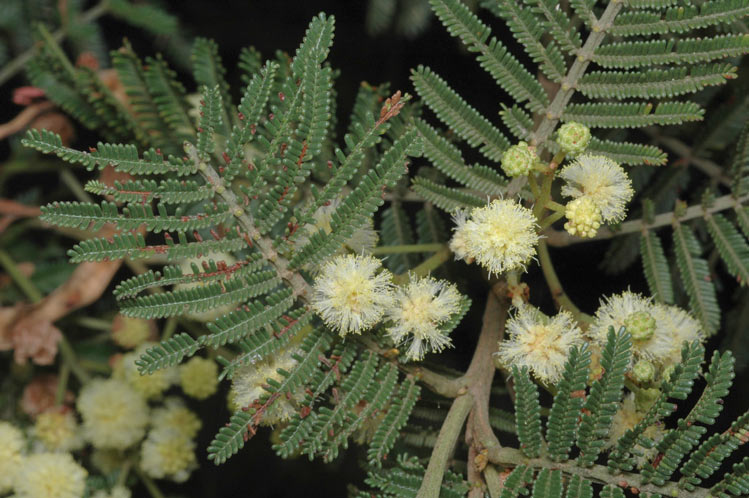

Conservation status
- Critically endangered (EPBC Act)

Scientific classification
- Kingdom: Plantae
- Clade: Tracheophytes
- Clade: Angiosperms
- Clade: Eudicots
- Clade: Rosids
- Order: Fabales
- Family: Fabaceae
- Subfamily: Caesalpinioideae
- Clade: Mimosoid clade
- Genus: Acacia
- Species: A. constablei

Binomial name
- Acacia constablei Tndale
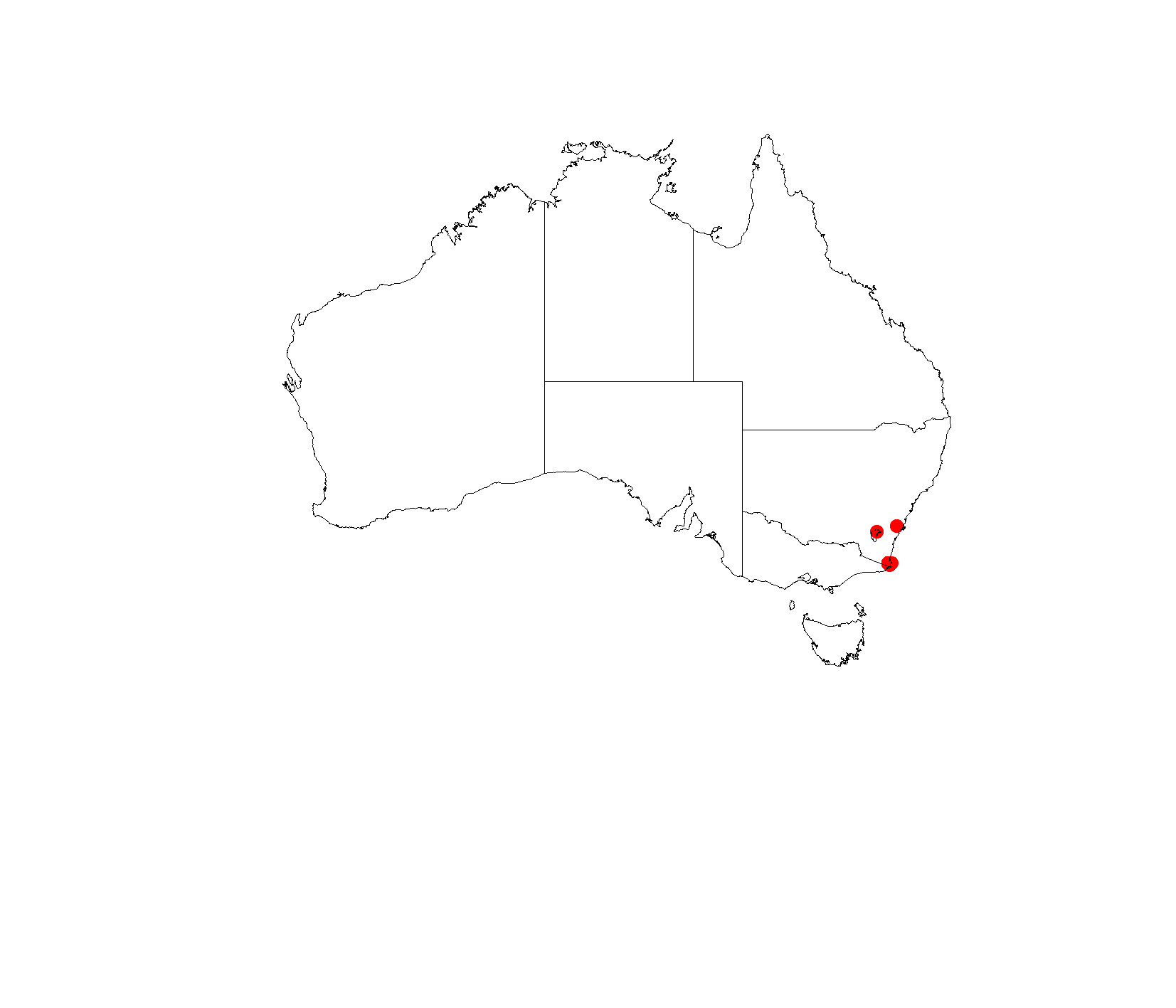
- Occurrence data from AVH

Synonyms
- Racosperma constablei (Tindale) Pedley

= Acacia constablei =

Narrabarba wattle

Species of legume

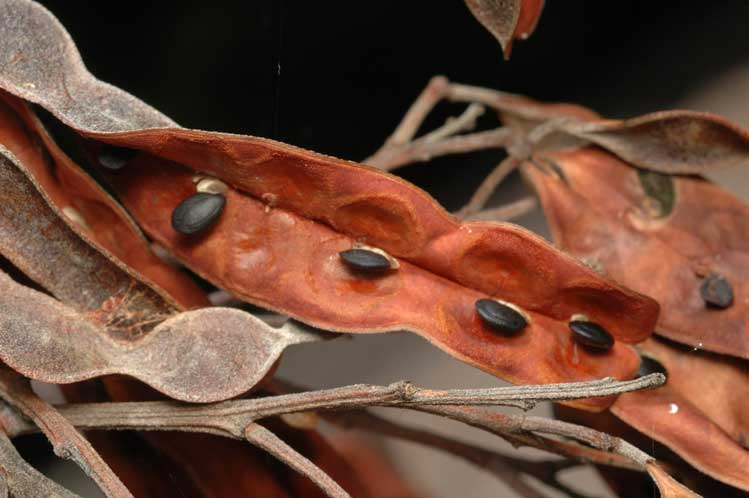
Pods

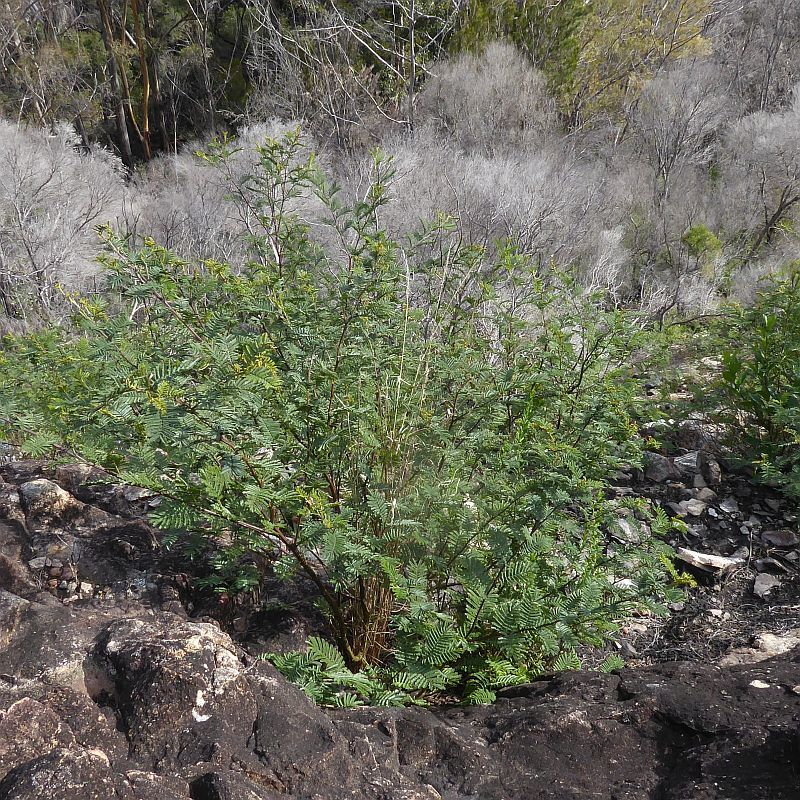
Habit

Acacia constablei, commonly known as the Narrabarba wattle, is a species of flowering plant in the family Fabaceae and is endemic to a restricted part of New South Wales, Australia. It is a straggling or erect shrub with smooth bark, knobbly branchlets, bipinnate leaves with 6 to 14 pairs of pinnae, each with 9 to 30 pairs of more or less oblong or narrowly oblong pinnules, spherical heads of pale yellow or cream-coloured flowers, and straight to slightly curved, leathery pods.

== Description ==
Acacia constablei is an erect to straggling shrub that typically grows to a height of 1–3 m (3 ft 3 in – 9 ft 10 in) but can be as tall as 7 m (23 ft). It has smooth grey, often mottled bark and dark grey branchlets with knobbly ridges. Its leaves are bipinnate, thick, leathery and dark green, on a petiole up to 10 mm (0.39 in) long, the rachis 17–50 mm (0.67–1.97 in) long with mostly 6 to 19 pairs of pinnae, each with 9 to 30 pairs of oblong to narrowly oblong closely-spaced pinnules 1–2.5 mm (0.039–0.098 in) long and 0.5–0.8 mm (0.020–0.031 in) wide. The flowers are borne in spherical heads in racemes in leaf axils, on a peduncle 2–6 mm (0.079–0.236 in) long, each head 5–7 mm (0.20–0.28 in) in diameter with 30 to 45 pale yellow or cream-coloured flowers. Flowering usually occurs between June and August and the pods are flat and straight to curved, 30–70 mm (1.2–2.8 in) long and 7–10 mm (0.28–0.39 in) wide, dark brown to black and covered in short fine hairs.

== Taxonomy ==
Acacia constablei was first formally described in 1980 by the Mary Tindale in the journal Telopea from specimens collected on a hill south-east of Narrabarba in the Mount Imlay National Park. The specific epithet honours Ernest Francis Constable, who was once the botanical collector for the Royal Botanic Gardens, Sydney.

== Distribution ==
Narrabarba wattle has a limited distribution about 20 km (12 mi) south of Eden in south western New South Wales with the bulk of the population confined to the Nadgee State Forest and within the boundaries of the proposed Narrabarba Hill Flora Reserve over a range of about 3 km (1.9 mi). Another smaller population in situated in Beowa National Park. The species is found on rocky rhyolite and apatite ridge-tops with nutrient poor skeletal sandy soils but sometimes in brown to black loamy soils. The estimated population is about 6,000 individuals in an area of around 4 ha (9.9 acres).

== Conservation status ==
Acacia constablei is listed as "critically endangered" under the Australian Government Environment Protection and Biodiversity Conservation Act 1999 and the New South Wales Government Biodiversity Conservation Act 2016.

== See also ==
- List of Acacia species
