= Mark Boyd =

Mark Boyd may refer to:

- Mark Boyd (footballer) (born 1981), English football midfielder
- Mark Boyd (author) (1805–1879), English author
- Mark Alexander Boyd (1562–1601), Scottish poet and soldier of fortune
- Mark Frederick Boyd (1889–1968), American malariologist and writer
