= Robert Coates =

Robert Coates is the name of:

- Robert Coates (actor) (1772–1848), British would-be-actor, famous for his atrocious skills
- Robert Coates (cricketer) (1881–1956), New Zealand cricketer
- Robert Coates (writer) (1897–1973), American novelist, short-story writer and art critic
- Robert Coates (politician) (1928–2016), Canadian politician
