= Beowa National Park =

National park in New South Wales, Australia

- IUCN category II (national park)
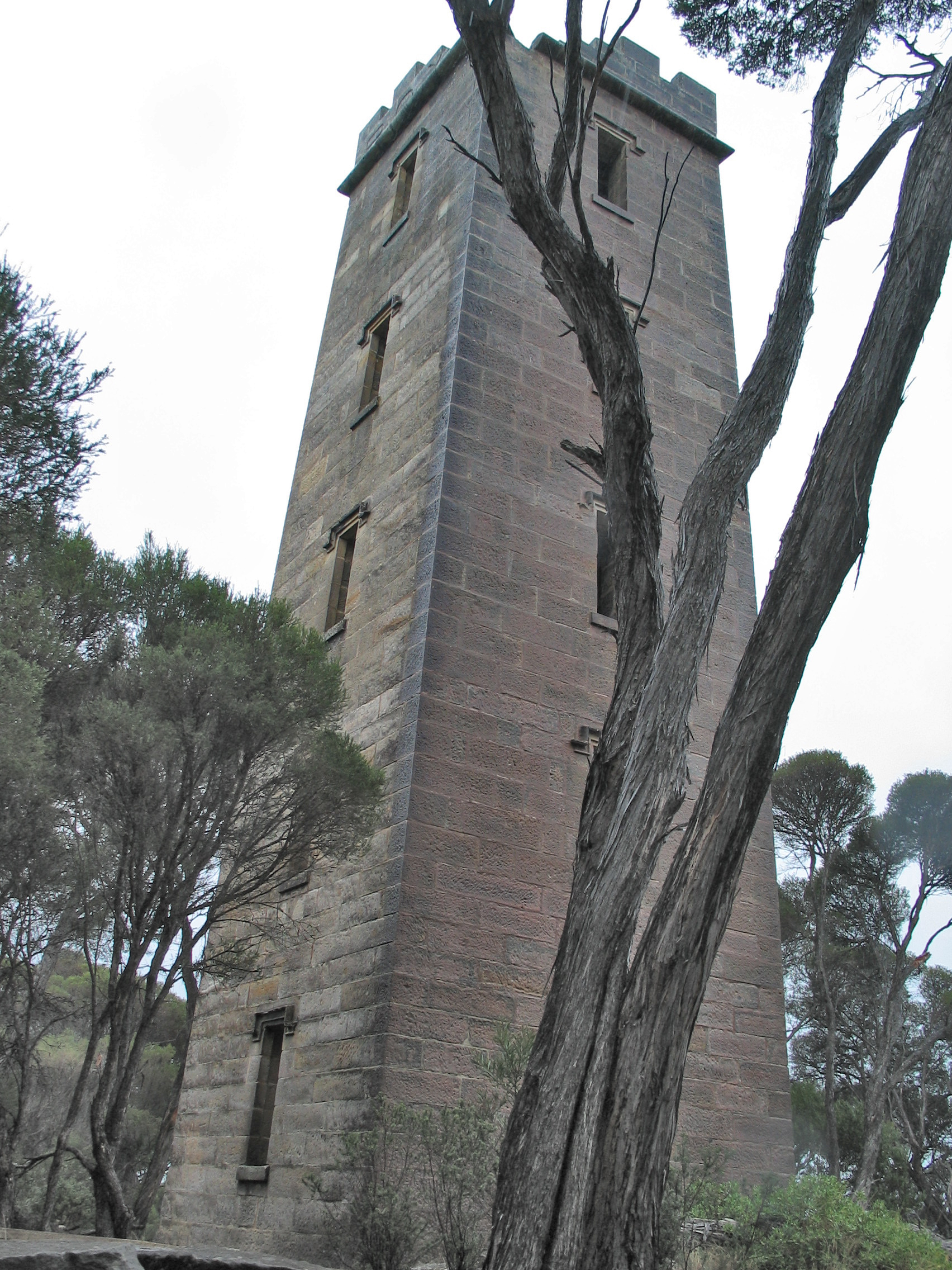
- Ben Boyd's tower

- Location within New South Wales
- Location: New South Wales
- Coordinates: 37°10′43″S 149°58′56″E
- Area: 104.86 km^{2} (40.49 sq mi)
- Established: 1971
- Governing body: NSW National Parks & Wildlife Service
- Website: https://www.nationalparks.nsw.gov.au/visit-a-park/parks/ben-boyd-national-park

Beowa National Park, formerly Ben Boyd National Park, is a national park in New South Wales, Australia, 578 km (359 mi) south of Sydney. It was established in 1971 and officially renamed in 2022 owing to its previous namesake's connection with blackbirding. Beowa means "orca", an animal of significance to the traditional owners, the Thaua people.

The park forms part of the Ulladulla to Merimbula Important Bird Area.

== History ==
The park was established in 1971 covering 8,900 ha (22,000 acres) and was originally named after Benjamin Boyd. Boyd was a wealthy pastoralist and businessman in the 1840s, with interests in shipping (including whaling), based on the South Coast of NSW. At the time, the area was part of the District of Port Phillip and Boyd was elected to the NSW Legislative Council for the electoral district of Port Phillip. He was the first in Australia to engage in blackbirding, a practice akin to slavery, when a ship he had commissioned brought 65 Melanesian labourers to Boyd Town in 1847.

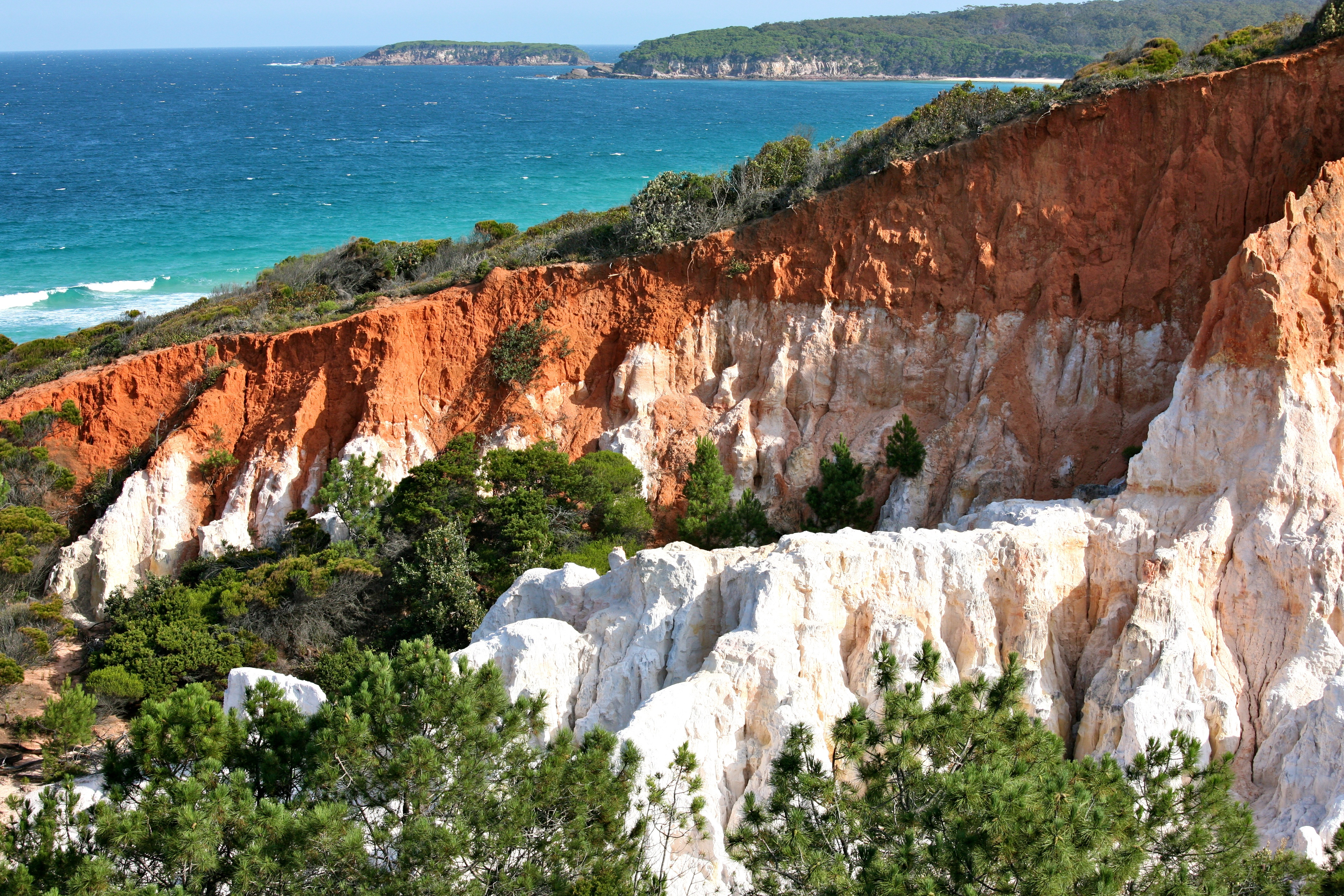
The Pinnacles, with white sand overlain by red clay

Boyd commissioned the construction of a sandstone tower overlooking the entrance to the harbour of Twofold Bay to alert whaling crews of the approach of their prey. The tower was never completed.

In the wake of the George Floyd protests around the world and in Australia and the Black Lives Matter movement gaining pace in mid-2020, calls for the national park to be renamed were renewed. Matt Kean, the NSW Environment Minister, promised to seek a briefing about renaming the park and then to consult with local elders and the community. In November 2021, Kean announced Ben Boyd National Park would be renamed Beowa Natural Park, after consultations with more than 60 representatives from Aboriginal and South Sea Islander communities. In September 2022 it was officially renamed, under new environment minister James Griffin. On 11 November 2023, Thaua and South Sea Islander elders conducted a ceremony together to mark the park's name change. The name Beowa had been selected in honour of the orca, which is significant to the Thaua people. According to their mythology, their ancestors are orcas, and when one of them dies they are reincarnated as an orca.

The park has been expanded from its original 8,900 ha (22,000 acres) to cover 10,486 ha (25,910 acres) over time.

== Description ==
The park consists of two sections, on either side of Twofold Bay and the town of Eden. The smaller northern section is bounded on its western border by the Princes Highway. The geology of this section is mainly sedimentary rock (ironstone and clay) laid down in the Paleogene, with some quartzite outcrops. The main attraction for tourists is the Pinnacles, a multicoloured erosion gully with white sands overlaid by rusty red clay. The southern section coastline is metamorphic and Devonian in age, with some heavily folded sections at Red Point, near Boyd's tower.

The park is fairly flat, with none of the northern section exceeding 100 metres (300 ft) in elevation, and the southern section not much higher; the tallest peak is Haycock Hill at 252 metres (827 ft). The region is particularly windy, dry and cold, and the headlands are covered in a low ground-hugging heathland community of plants. Further inland, the heath is replaced by open eucalypt woodland, which makes up most of the park's habitat. The two dominant tree species are silvertop ash (Eucalyptus sieberi) and red bloodwood (Corymbia gummifera). There are also scattered pockets of rainforest in gullies and protected areas, with species such as the scentless rosewood (Synoum glandulosum) and smooth mock-olive (Notelaea venosa).

== Flora and fauna ==
The park forms part of the Ulladulla to Merimbula Important Bird Area, identified as such by BirdLife International because of its importance for swift parrots. It was recorded in 1996 that 212 species of bird had been recorded in the park, with the heathlands being home to the eastern ground parrot and endangered eastern bristlebird, while the little tern breeds in the sand dunes and beaches. At the time, the tern was threatened by recreational four-wheel driving.

Fifty species of mammal had been recorded by 2010. Pests recorded include cats and foxes, occasional feral dogs, and rabbits. Bitou bush (Chrysanthemoides monilifera) was a problem weed north of the Pambula River.
