= Boydtown, New South Wales =

Boydtown
- Town
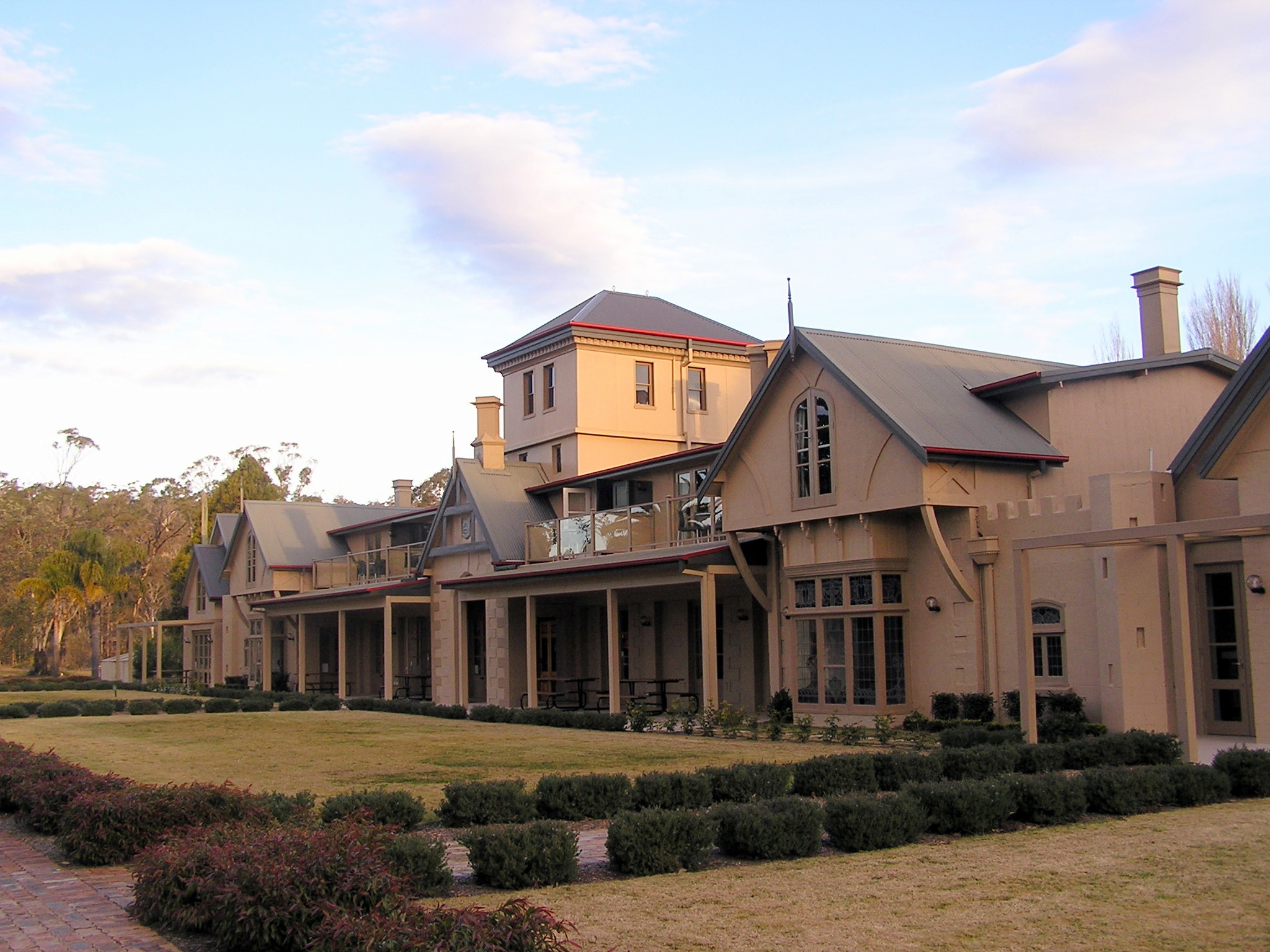
- The Seahorse Inn in July 2006

- Coordinates: 37°06′18″S 149°52′44″E
- Country: Australia
- State: New South Wales
- LGA: Bega Valley Shire
- Established: 1843

Government
  - State electorate: Bega
  - Federal division: Eden-Monaro

Population
  - Total: 75 (2021 census)
- Postcode: 2551

Boydtown is a village on Twofold Bay near Eden, on the far south coast of New South Wales, Australia. It was the original settlement in the bay, founded by Benjamin Boyd in 1843 to service his properties on the Monaro plains. The remains of whaling stations and the local landmark Boyd's Tower, a stone spotting tower used to look for whales, are all nearby.

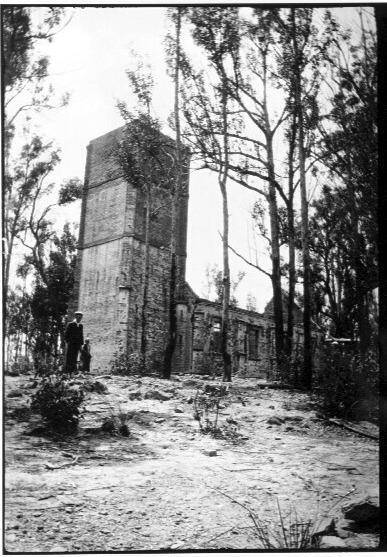
Ruin of old church at Boydtown in 1929

Boyd imported sandstone from Sydney to construct a lighthouse on south head. He also commissioned inns and churches, housing and store rooms, wharves and stock-yards.

When Boyd's finances collapsed, the town was abandoned from the 1840s until the first renovation of the Seahorse Inn in the 1930s.

In modern times, Boydtown is the smaller of the two towns in the bay, consisting mainly of housing, tourist caravan parks and the more recently (2006) refurbished Seahorse Inn.

== See also ==
- Beowa National Park
