= Benjamin Boyd =

Scottish-Australian entrepreneur and politician (1801-1851)

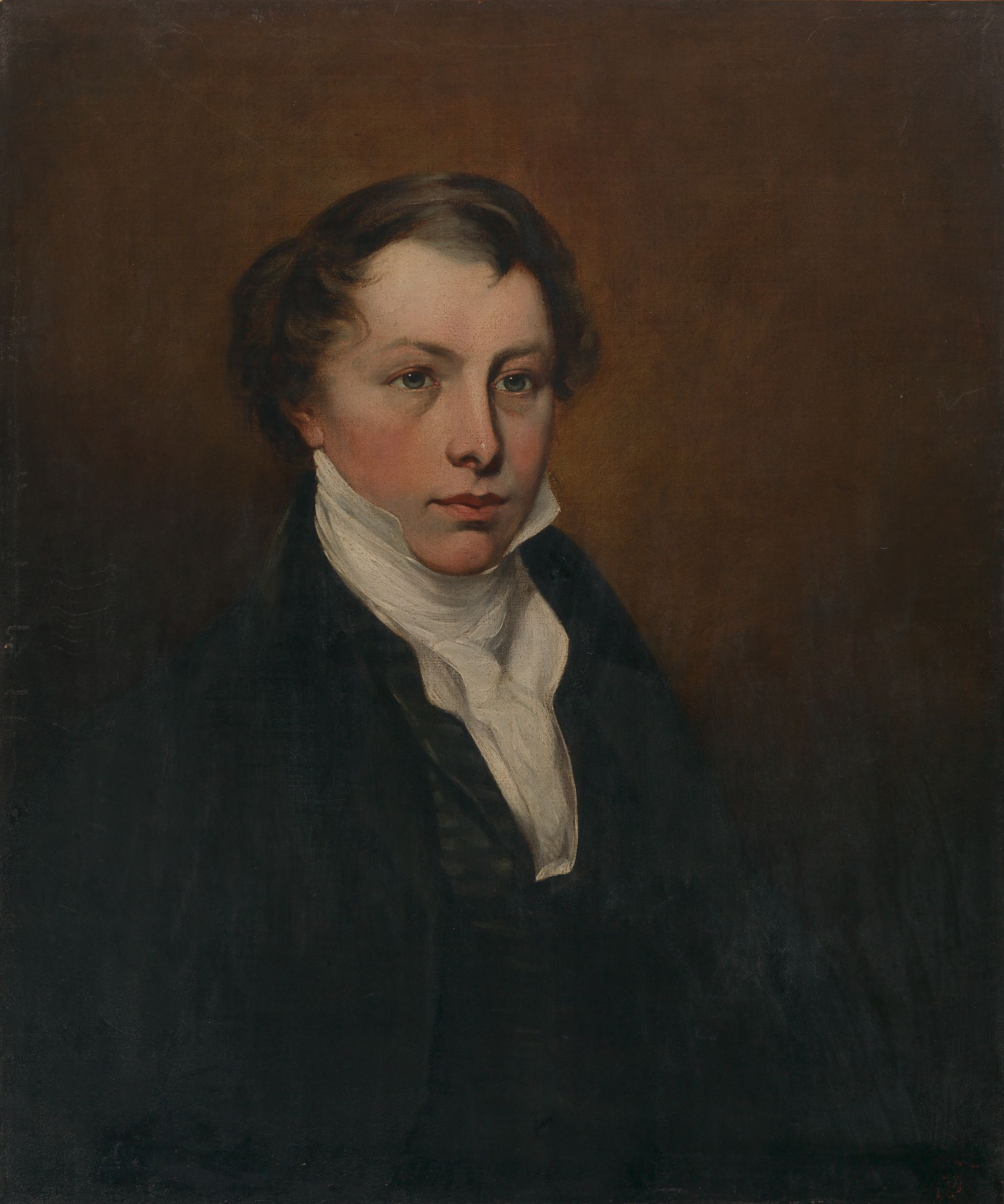
- Portrait of Boyd, c. 1830s, State Library of New South Wales

Member of the Legislative Council of New South Wales
- In office 1 September 1844 – 1 August 1845
- Constituency: Electoral district of Port Phillip

Personal details
- Born: 21 August 1801 Wigtownshire, Scotland, United Kingdom
- Died: 15 October 1851 (aged 50) Honiara, Guadalcanal, Solomon Islands
- Occupation: Stockbroker, pastoralist, entrepreneur

Benjamin Boyd (21 August 1801 – 15 October 1851) was a Scottish entrepreneur who became a major shipowner, banker, grazier, politician and blackbirder in the British colony of New South Wales. He was briefly a member of the Legislative Council.

Boyd became one of the largest landholders and graziers in the Colony of New South Wales before suffering financial difficulties and becoming bankrupt. Boyd briefly tried his luck on the Californian goldfields before venturing to establish a Pacific union, being purportedly murdered on Guadalcanal in the Solomon Islands. Many of his business ventures involved blackbirding, the practice of coercing South Sea Islanders to work in circumstances akin to slavery.

== Early life ==
Born at Merton Hall, Wigtownshire, Scotland, Boyd was the second son of Edward Boyd by his wife Jane (daughter of Benjamin Yule). His brother Mark Boyd would play an active role in some of his ventures.

By 1824, Boyd was a stockbroker in London. He held influential positions as a Director for the Union Bank of London and the North British Insurance Company.

== Royal Bank of Australia ==
Owning a vessel got Boyd into the Royal Yacht Squadron, where he could associate with the landed classes.

He arrived in Australia in 1842, preceded by three steamships, the first ocean-going steamships in Australian waters. These and two sail ships carried funds and employees of the bank.

The Royal Bank of Australia, formed in 1839, never carried out more than cursory banking operations. Instead, its funds were largely fraudulently used to finance Boyd's pastoral, shipping and whaling activities. Through the bank, Boyd also lent money to the New Zealand Government. The bank was liquidated in 1846 with heavy losses incurred by depositors and shareholders.

Henry Sewell, whom Boyd met through the Royal Yacht Squadron, became involved in the Royal Bank of Australia. He was subsequently able to use his experience of colonial affairs in joining the Canterbury Association which advocated for the colonisation of New Zealand, and in time was elected the colony's first premier.

== Squatter and politician ==
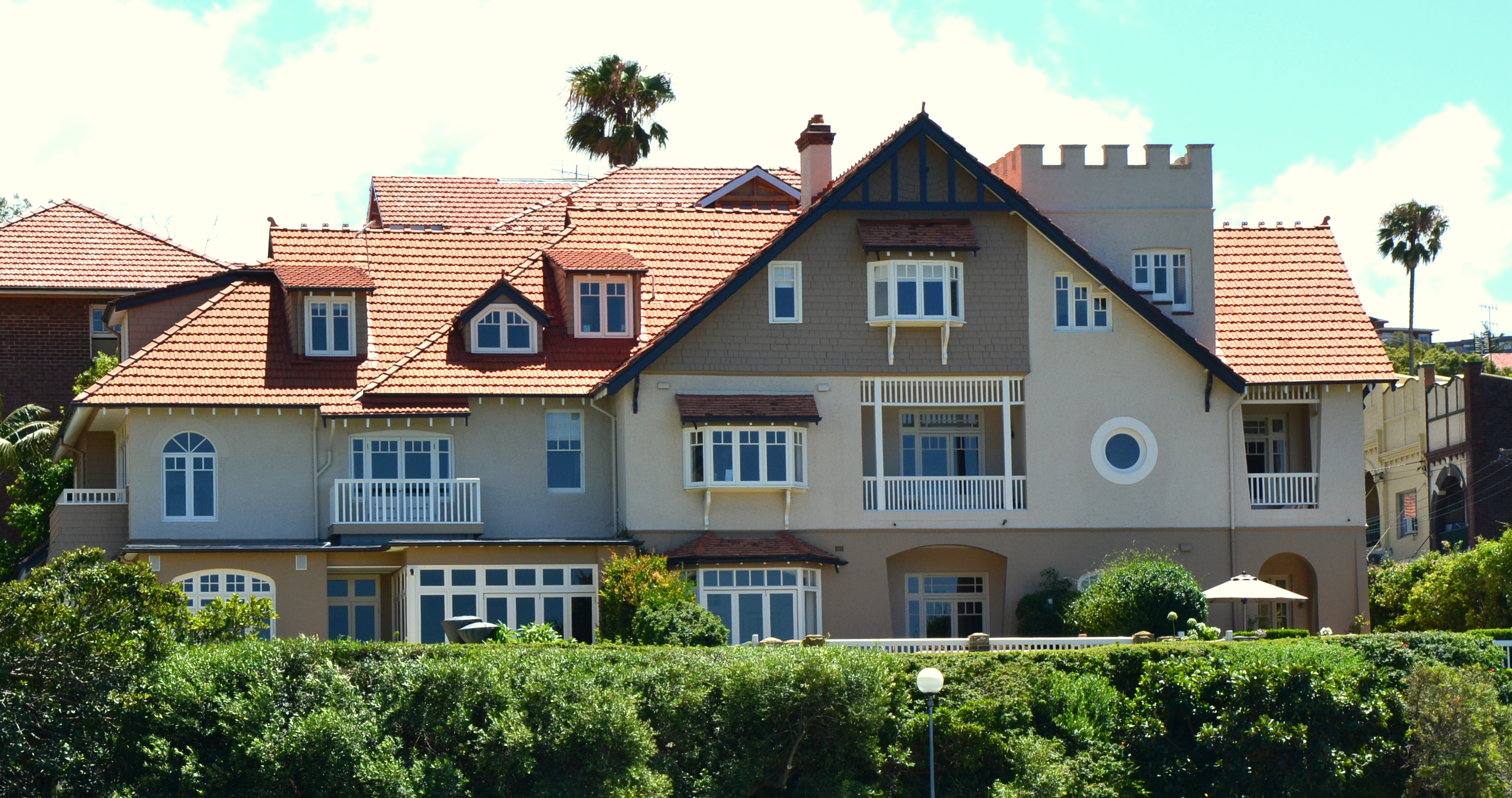
Craignathan, Neutral Bay

Boyd became a prominent squatter and absentee farmer, heading the Pastoral Association and operating the pro-squatter Atlas newspaper. In a dispatch of Governor Sir George Gipps dated 17 May 1844,

Boyd operated a wool-washing facility in Neutral Bay, where he also resided at his home from 1844 to 1849, Craignathan.

Boyd was elected to the New South Wales Legislative Council for the Electoral district of Port Phillip in September 1844, a position he held for 11 months.

In 1846, Boyd and Joseph Robinson, with the assistance of William Bland, established the Spectator newspaper to promote squatters' interests, installing Richard Thompson as editor. The paper ceased publication at the end of the year as the squatters' demands had been met. Boyd bought a controlling interest in The Australian in 1847, appointing Thompson as managing editor. The Australian ceased publication in 1848 as Boyd's financial situation collapsed.

=== Boydtown ===
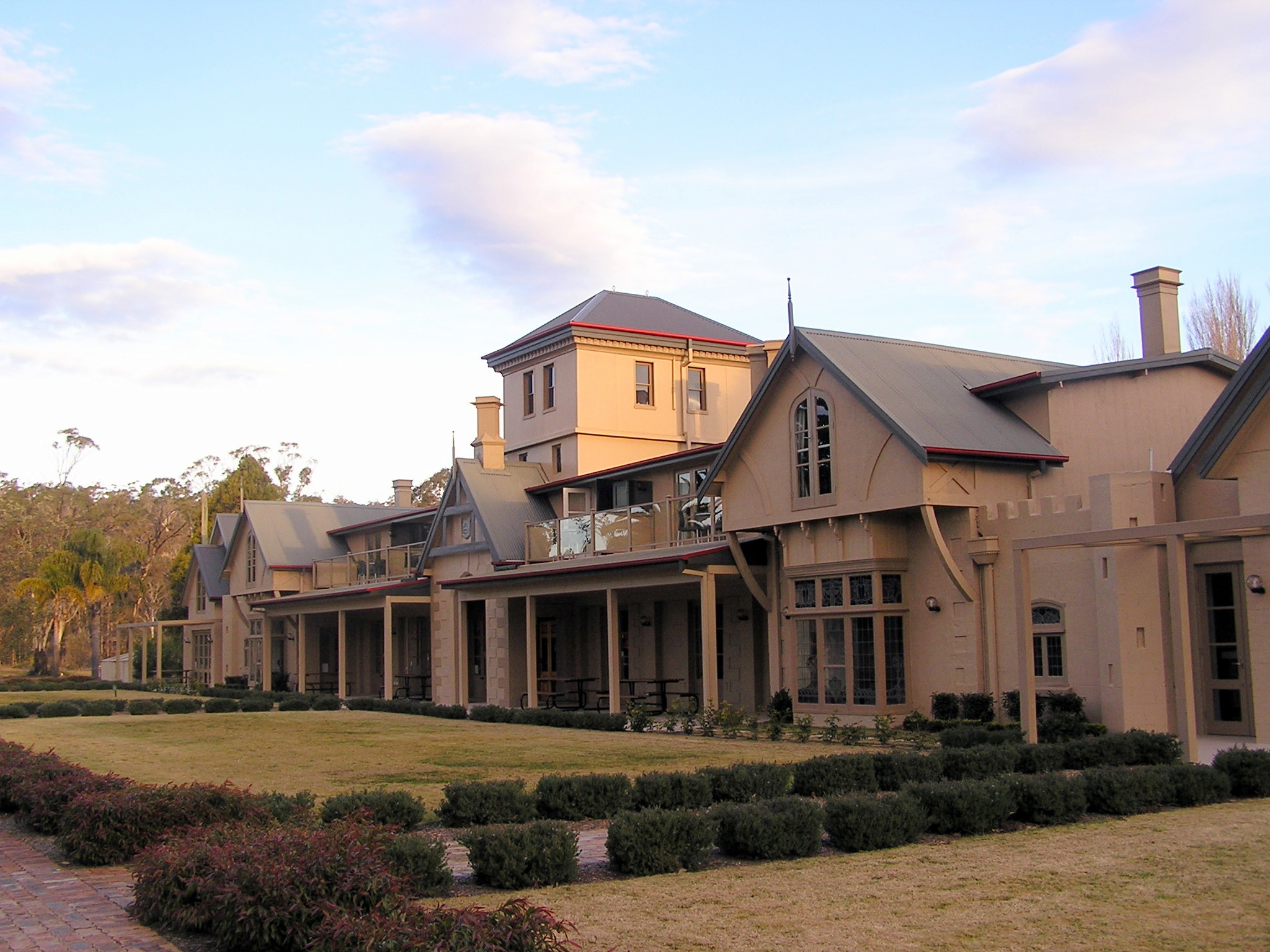
Seahorse Inn, Boydtown

Boydtown was the original settlement in the bay, founded by Boyd in 1843 to service his properties on the Monaro Plains.

Among the ships he owned were nine vessels that made 33 whaling voyages between 1843 and 1850.

With the collapse of Boyd's finances, the town was abandoned from the 1840s until the first renovation of the Seahorse Inn in the 1930s.

== Blackbirding ==
In 1847, Boyd brought the first 65 Islanders to Australia from Lifu Island in the Loyalty Islands (now part of New Caledonia) and from Tanna and Aneityum Islands in the New Hebrides (now Vanuatu). They landed at Boydtown. The local justice of the peace, Oswald Walters Brierly described them this way: "none of the natives could speak English, and all were naked..". "[T]hey all crowded around us looking at us with the utmost surprize, and feeling at the Texture of our clothes…they seemed wild and restless." They had all put their marks on contracts that bound them to work for five years and to be paid 26 shillings a year, plus rations of 10 lbs of meat a week, and two pairs of trousers, two shirts and a kilmarnock cap. However, clearly they had no idea of what they were doing in Australia, and Brierly refused to counter-sign the documents. Regardless, some of Boyd's employees began to take the party inland on foot. Some of them bolted and made their way back to Eden. The first one died on 2 May and as winter approached more became ill. Sixteen Lifou Islanders refused to work and began to try to walk back to Lifou along the coast. Some managed to reach Sydney and seven or eight entered a shop from the rear and began to help themselves to food. Those that remained at work were shepherds on far off Boyd stations on the Edward and Murray Rivers.

Boyd refused to admit that the trial shipment was a failure, sending for more Islanders. By this time colonial society was beginning to realise what he had done and was feeling uneasy. The New South Wales Legislative Council amended the Masters and Servants Act to ban importation of "the Natives of any Savage or uncivilized tribe inhabiting any Island or Country in the Pacific". When Boyd's next group of 54 men and 3 women arrived in Sydney on 17 October, they could not be indentured and once Boyd found this out he refused to take any further responsibility. The same legal conditions also applied to Boyd's Islander labourers from the first trip; they left the stations and set off to walk to Sydney to find alternative work and to find a way home to the islands. The foreman tried to stop them but the local magistrate ruled that no one had the right to detain them. Their progress from the Riverina was followed by the press as they began their long march to Sydney. The press described them as cannibals on their way to eat Boyd, and the issue as depicted in the media was extremely racist.

The whole matter was raised again in the Legislative Council and Boyd showed no remorse or sense of responsibility. Boyd justified himself with reference to the African slave trade and there was much discussion in the colony about the issue to introducing slaves from the Pacific Islands. The 'recruiters' were accused of kidnapping, a charge with they denied. Rumours about Boyd's recruiting methods prompted the Aborigines’ Protection Society and the Anti-Slavery Association to call on the Colonial Office to hold an inquiry. Concerns that the labourers were imported against their will led to an investigation by the Attorney-General, and in December 1847 Governor Sir Charles FitzRoy reported to the Colonial Office that such allegations were unsubstantiated.

The Islanders remained around Sydney Harbour, begging for transport back to their islands. Some of them found alternative work in Sydney and dropped out of the record. 60 Pacific Islanders left Australia via the French ships the Arche d'Alliance, the Lynher and the Statesman returning to the islands, although it is unlikely that many of them ever reached their home islands. This fiasco was the first time Pacific Islanders had been imported into Australia as labourers, although some had already reached Sydney as ships' crews.

Ben Boyd biographer Marion Diamond assessed allegations of slavery at the time, writing that "Despite Lowe's eloquence, [Boyd's] recruitment was not quite a slave trade, though it pointed the way towards the next generation of 'blackbirders'." She argues that Boyd "was less racist than his morally outraged accusers," for Boyd saw his employees merely as workers whereas his opponents viewed them as a racial threat.

== In the Pacific ==
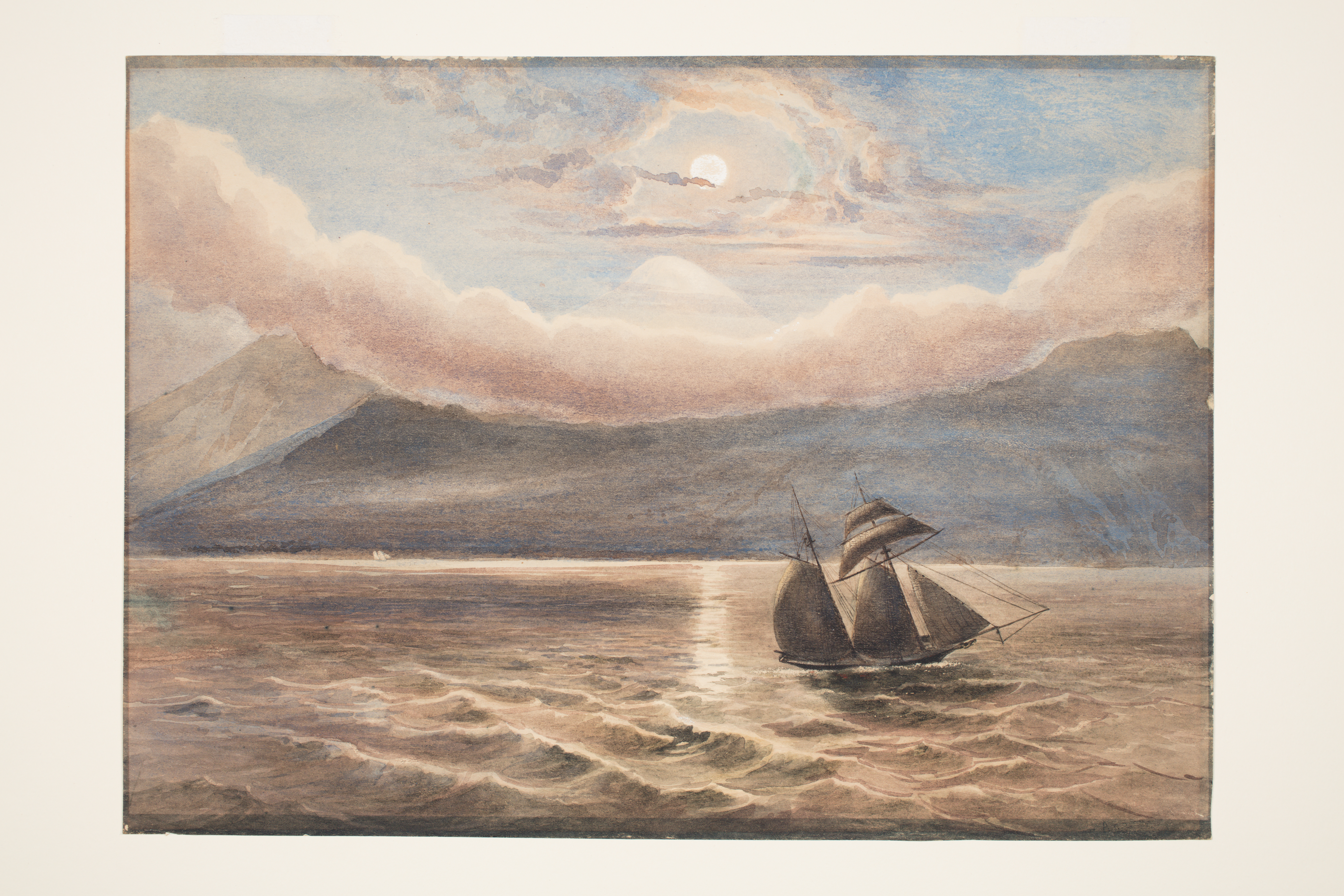
Watercolour by George French Angas depicting the Wanderer passing Hawaii in 1851

In October 1840, when Boyd wrote to the Colonial Office seeking support for the Royal Bank of Australia, he also enquired about the attitude the government would hold toward a hypothetical republic in the South Seas. Secretary of State for War and the Colonies Lord John Russell replied that he did not feel that he could "enter into any engagement on behalf of H. M. Government at present."

With no success with gold-digging in California, in June 1851 Boyd sailed in Wanderer among the Pacific Islands with the aim of establishing a union of Pacific islands. John Webster, who sailed with him, wrote that:

It was his love of adventure, no doubt, which constituted the great attraction. But there was a definite object in his view. This was to establish a Papuan Republic or Confederation: to lay the foundation of some sort of social and politician organisation, on which the simple machinery of an independent state might afterwards be erected. Had death not cut short Mr. Boyd's career, he would doubtless have succeeded in this object.

He reconnoitred various South Seas islands and finally settled on two islands in the Solomons to base a South Seas republic. They were San Cristobal (now Makira) and Guadalcanal.

== Death ==
On 15 October 1851, on Guadalcanal in the Solomon Islands, Boyd went ashore with a crew member to shoot game. Soon after entering a small creek in his boat, two shots were heard 15 minutes apart but Boyd never returned. At the same time, the remaining crew aboard Wanderer were involved in a large skirmish with the local population. Muskets, swivel guns and grapeshot were utilised against the natives resulting in over twenty-five fatalities.

A search party later looked for Boyd, finding his boat, belt and an expended firearm cartridge. In days following Boyd's disappearance, his crew raided and destroyed a number of villages in the area now known as Wanderer Bay before sailing for Port Macquarie.

Amid rumors that Boyd had survived and was living on Guadalcanal, Captain Lewis Truscott sailed to the islands on the vessel Oberon. This expedition was able to ascertain that Boyd was initially taken prisoner but was later executed in retribution for the number of villagers killed by the actions of the crew of Wanderer. Boyd's head was cut off and his skull kept locally in a ceremonial house. Truscott was able to purchase Boyd's skull from the leading men of the district and returned with it to Sydney. Boyd's attendant was also slain. The Sydney Morning Herald remarked of Boyd's death that:

...the melancholy fate of Mr. Boyd is to be attributed less to the murderous propensity of the islanders, than to a sense of savage justice. The narrative we append will show that the crew of the Wanderer were the aggressors in this lamentable matter. That they first slew several of the natives of the island, and it was on this account, while on an errand of peace, that Mr. Boyd himself was seized, his attendant slain, and himself tried by a tribunal of chiefs, and condemned to death.

== Personal life ==
While still a stockbroker in London, Boyd fell deeply in love with Emma Green and proposed marriage. He shared his "grandiose plans" for a new life in the colony of New South Wales, but she refused, reportedly finding the prospect of living in a primitive society among "violent criminals" unappealing. Devastated by the refusal, Boyd allegedly declared that no other woman would ever take her place. He remained unmarried for the rest of his life.

== Legacy ==
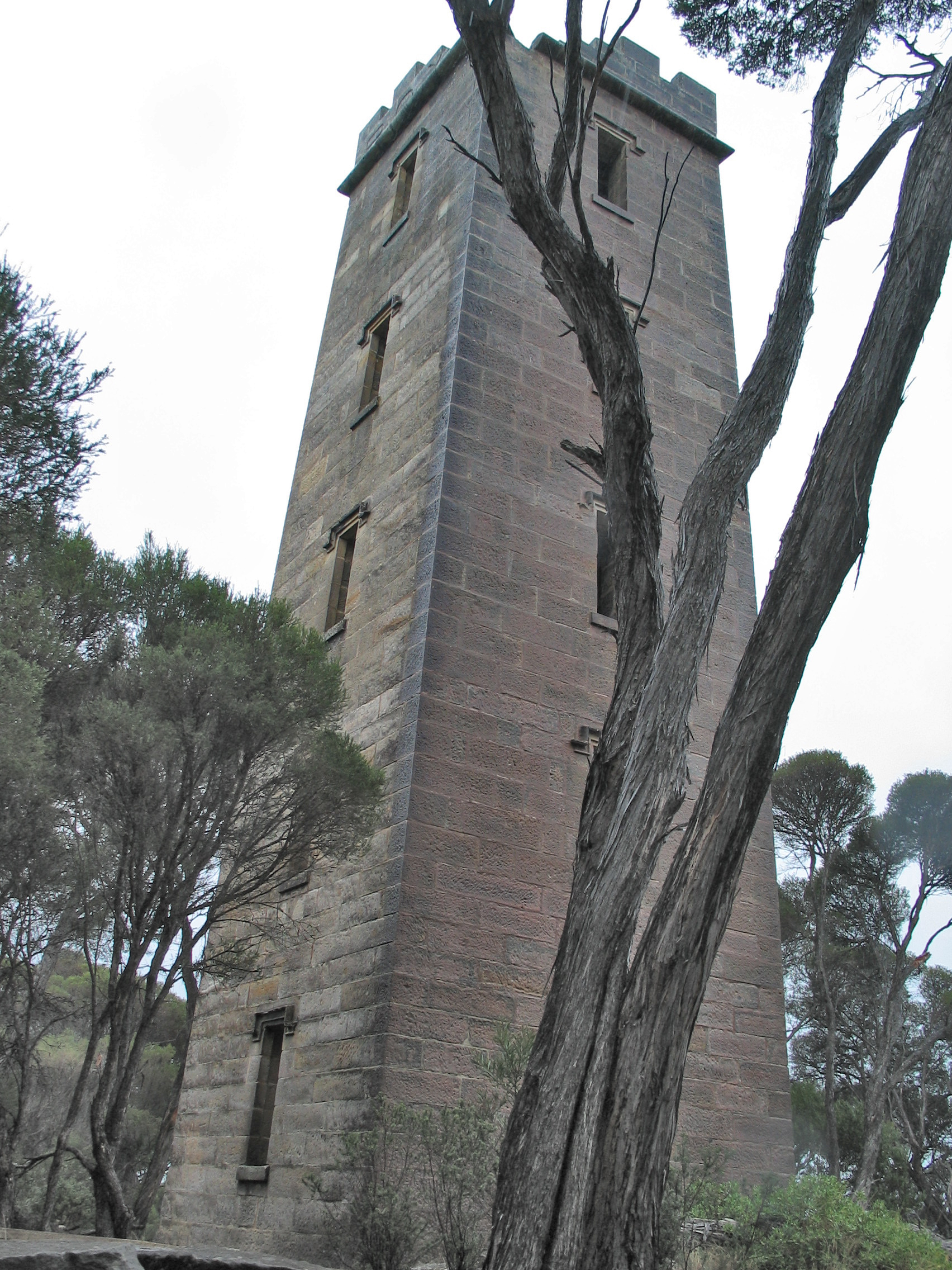
Ben Boyd's Tower, used for whale-spotting, Beowa National Park.

Boyd's legacy includes the buildings of Boydtown near Eden on Twofold Bay in New South Wales. The township was established by Boyd to provide services for the extensive properties he owned locally. It was abandoned in the mid-1840s when Boyd's finances failed. The township has since been revived.

Boyd's Tower is located at the entrance to the park near Twofold Bay and was designed as a lighthouse and lookout. The tower was designed by Oswald Brierly who had accompanied Boyd to Australia from England. It was built from sandstone quarried in Sydney. The structure was not commissioned as a lighthouse and the building work stopped in 1847 as funds became short. The tower was used as a whale sighting station. Whaling was already an established industry when Boyd arrived in the area and he brought with him his own boats and crew, and went into competition with the locals and expanded his fleet until he had nine whaling ships working for him.

The locality of Newton Boyd derives its name from a squatter run licensed under Archibald Boyd, cousin of Benjamin Boyd, who claimed the run as his own as well as others which were owned nominally by his cousins or business partner Joseph Robinson. The town of Newton Stewart in Scotland was near where Benjamin Boyd was raised. The name was in use by 1845.

Boyd's life was dramatised in the radio play The First Gentleman (1945) by Betty Roland, and in an episode of the television series Jonah (1962). George Blaikie wrote a fictionalised account of Boyd's life for his newspaper-syndicated series Our Strange Past, titled The Scot Who Would Be King (1953). An Australian animated children's television series first broadcast in 1999 entitled The Adventures of Sam features a character named Captain Ben Boyd who engages in blackbirding, and is likely inspired from the historical figure.

In 1971 the Ben Boyd National Park was established, located near Boydtown south of Eden and named after Boyd. The park area covers approximately 10,407 hectares (25,720 acres). In the wake of the George Floyd protests around the world and in Australia and the Black Lives Matter movement gaining pace in May–June 2020, calls for the national park to be renamed were renewed. Matt Kean, the NSW Environment Minister, commented that "national parks are about connecting people, not dividing them", and promised to seek a briefing about renaming the park and to consult with local Aboriginal Elders and the community about a suitable new name. In September 2022 the park was renamed Beowa National Park.

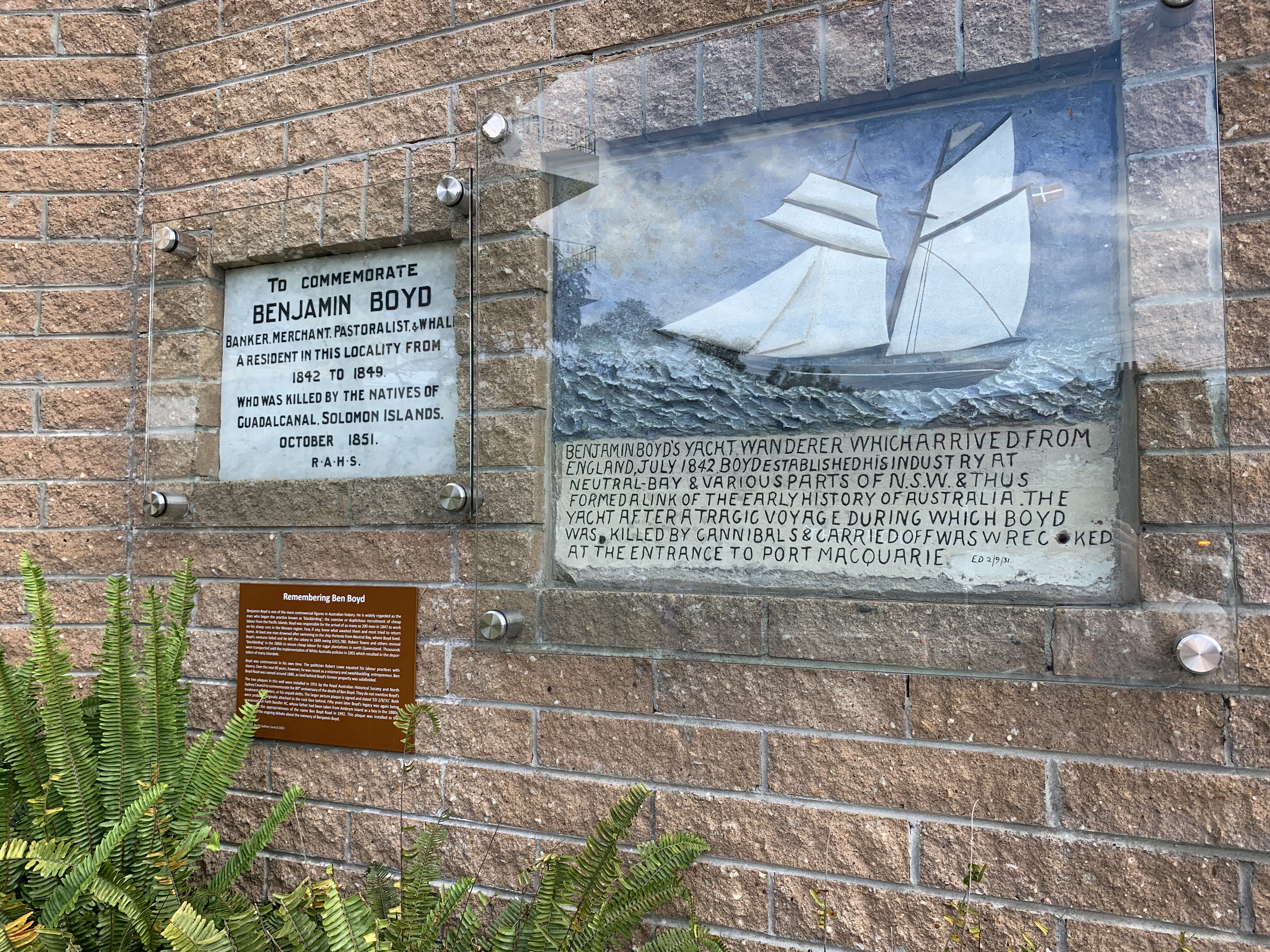
Commemorative plaques at Ben Boyd Road, Neutral Bay, NSW, Australia.

Ben Boyd Road in Neutral Bay was named in his honour. Three small plaques describing his life and death are on display at the corner of Ben Boyd Road and Kurraba Road, Neutral Bay. The North Sydney Council resolved to install the third plaque in 2021 to provide further context about Ben Boyd, his involvement in blackbirding and his reputation. Boyd house of Neutral Bay Primary School was likewise named after him; in 2021 after consulting with parents and students the house was renamed Waratah. To commemorate the 150th anniversary of Boyd's 1851 disappearance, a scale model of Wanderer was created for the Eden Killer Whale Museum.

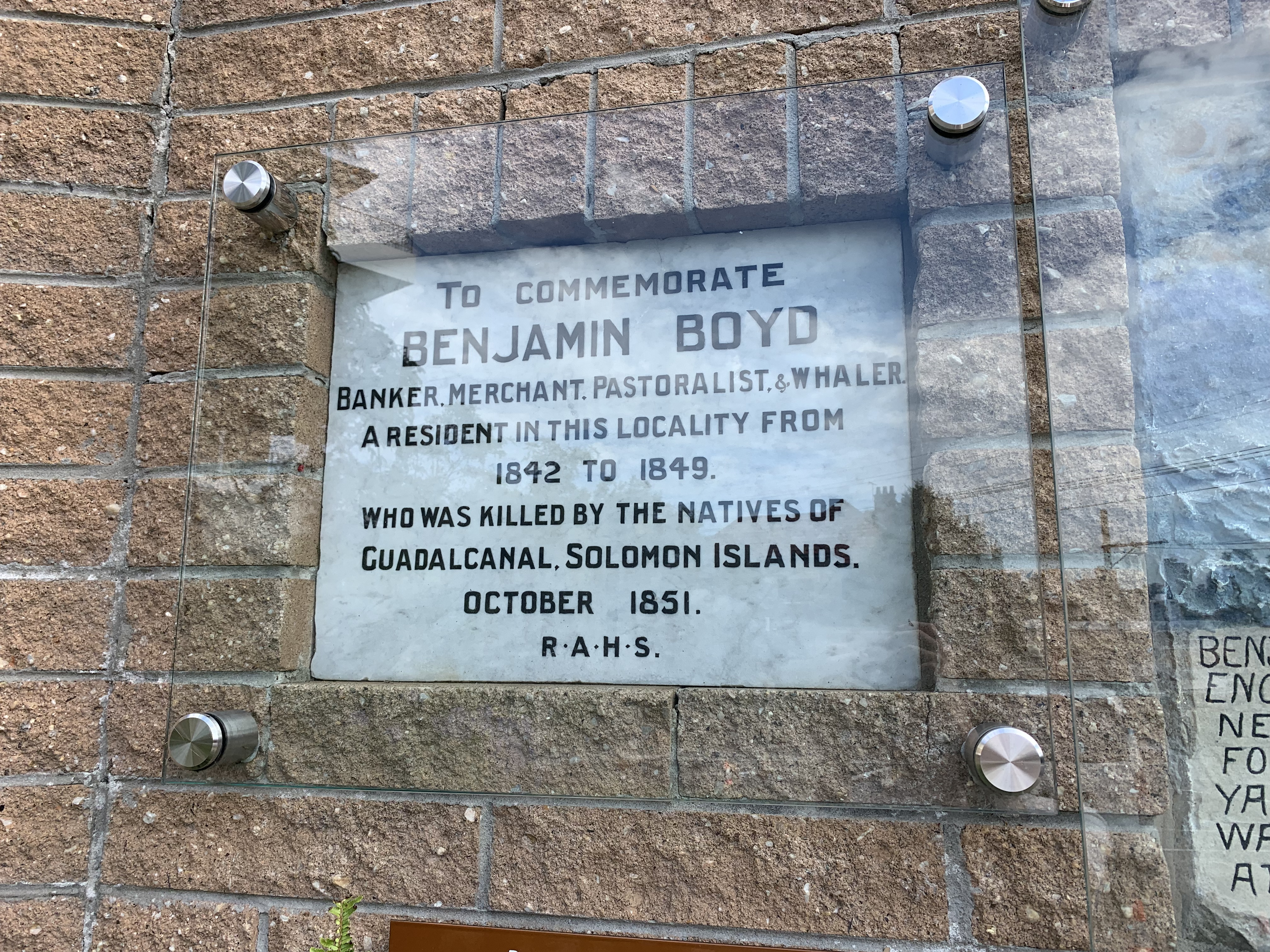

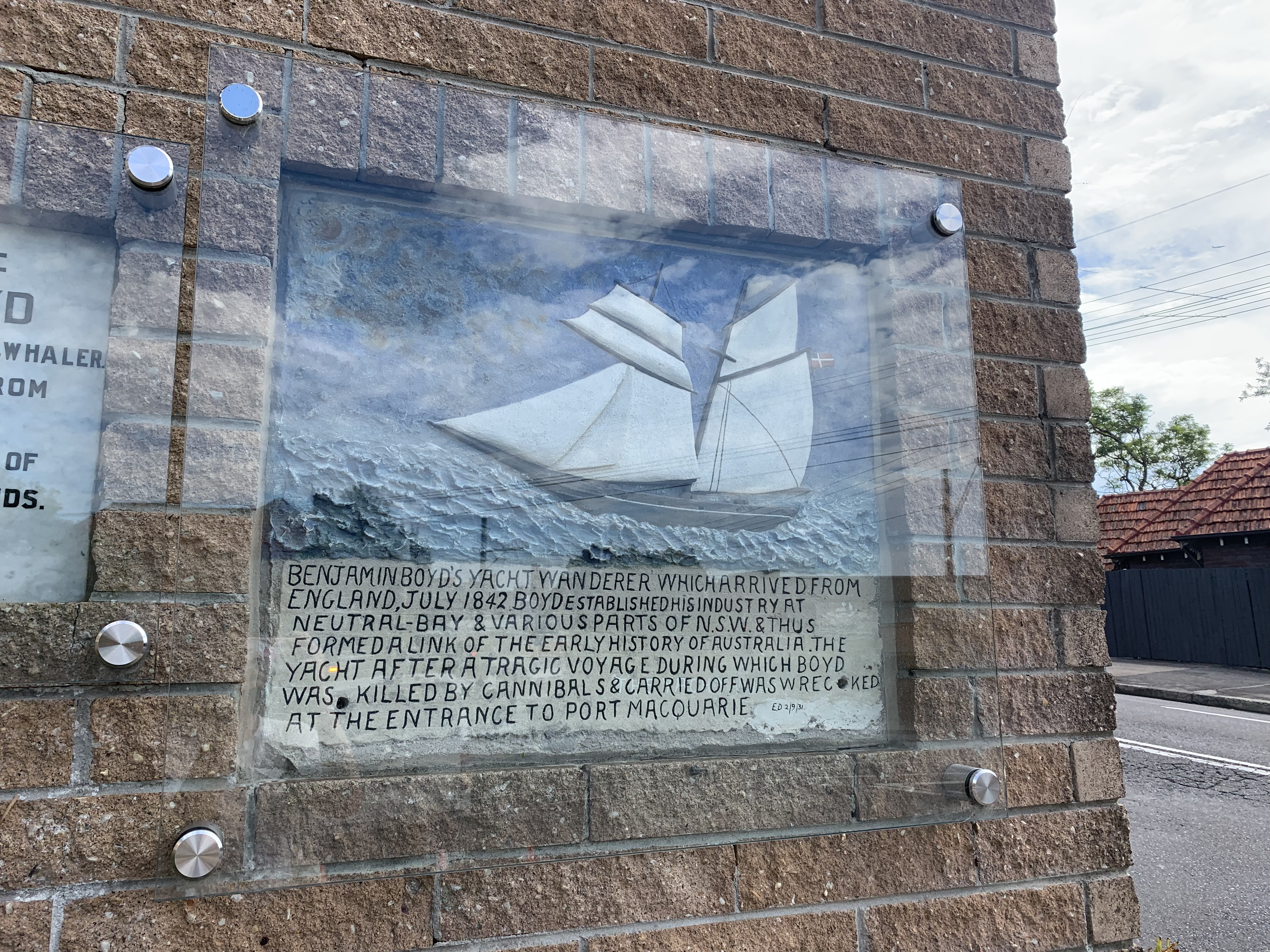

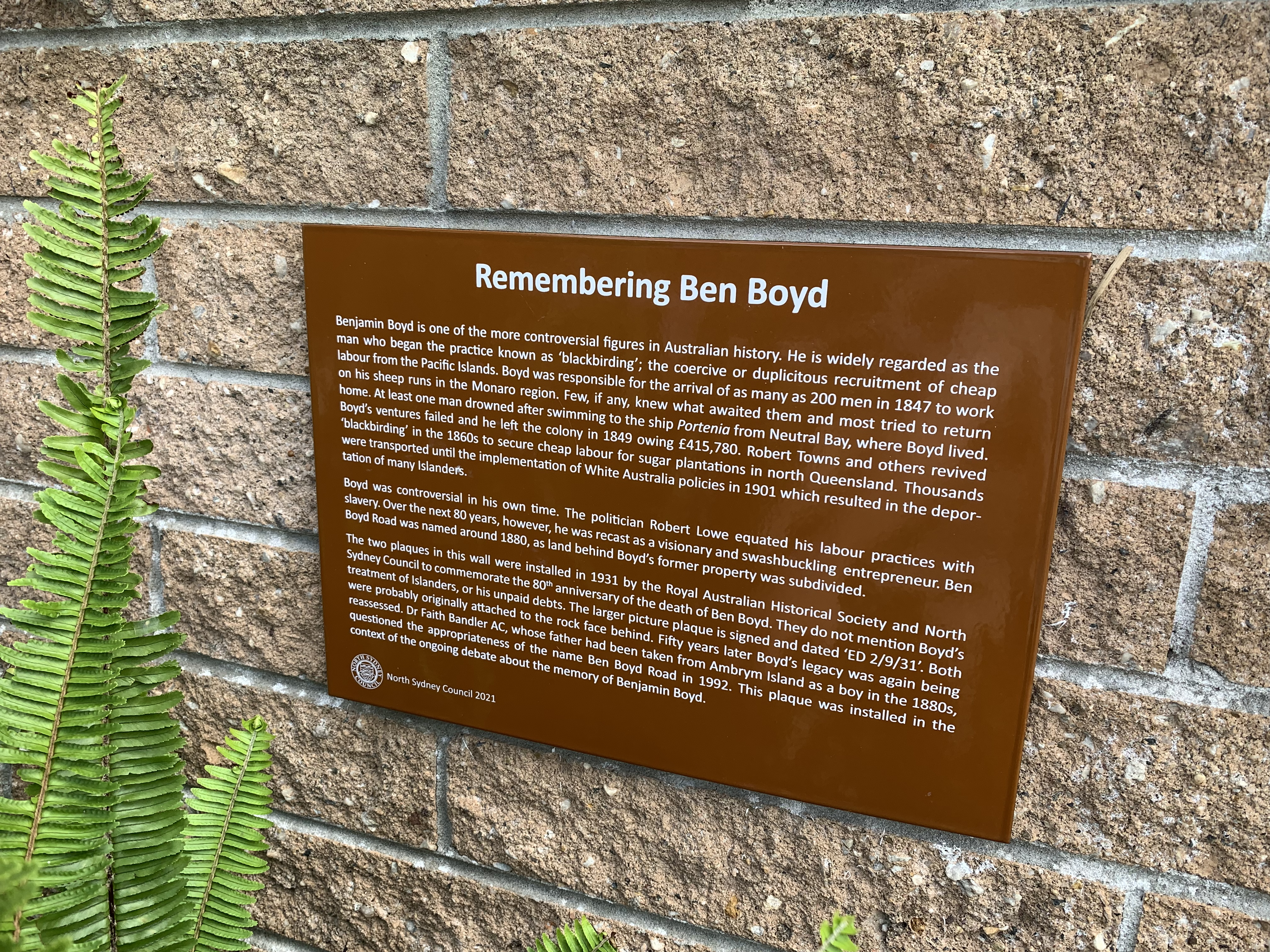

New South Wales Legislative Council
Preceded by Thomas Mitchell	Member for Port Phillip; 1844–1845; Served alongside: Thomas Walker, John Lang, Adolphus Young, Charles Nicholson	Succeeded by Edward Curr
