= Hastings (Neutral Bay) =

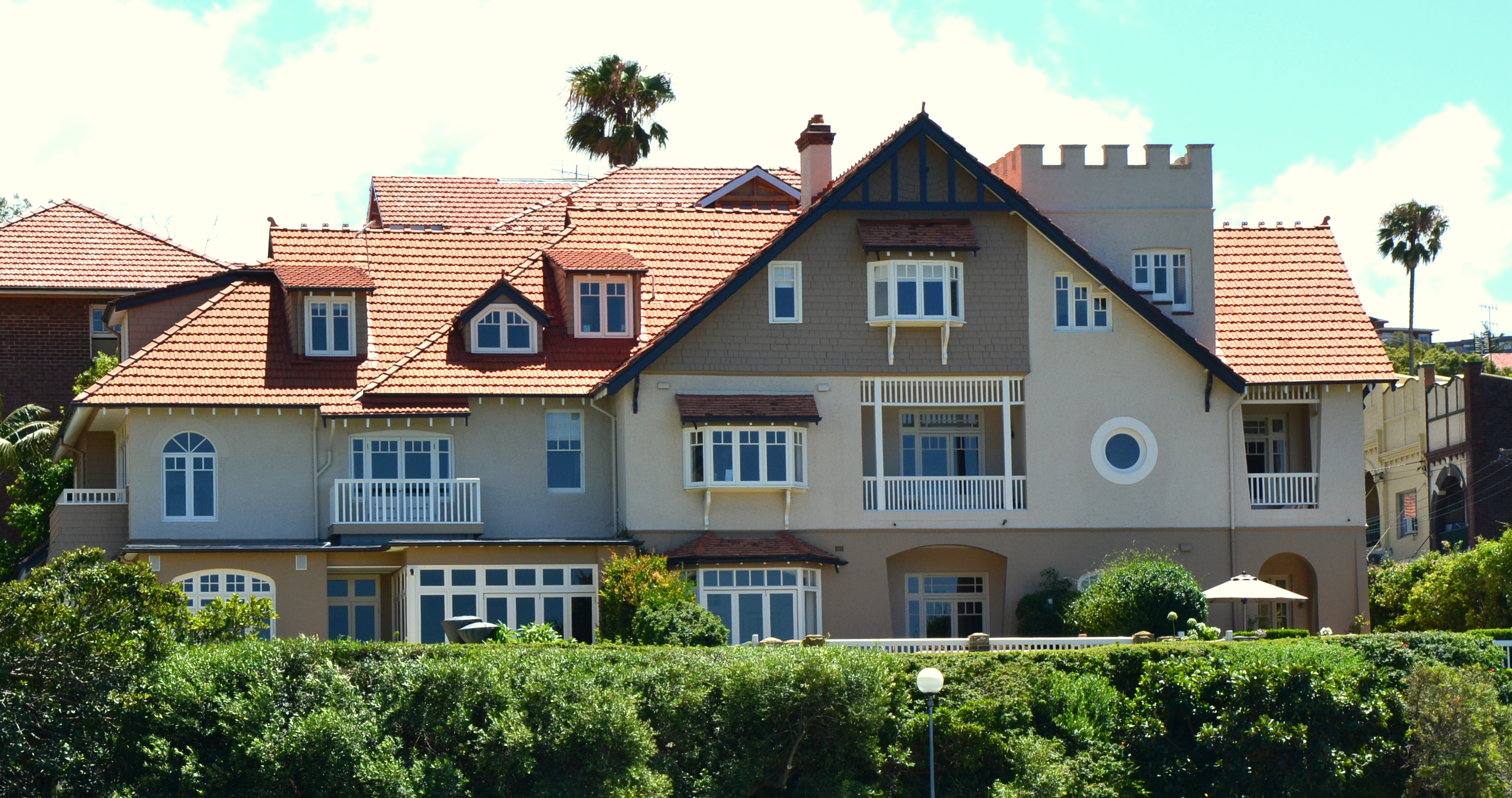
- Hastings, pictured in 2012

- Location within Sydney Location within Australia
- 33°50′30″S 151°13′07″E
- Location: 2 Hayes Street, Neutral Bay, North Sydney Council, New South Wales, Australia

History
- Built: 1830–1913

Site notes
- Architect: Edward Jeaffreson Jackson (1913 house)
- Architectural style: Federation Arts and Crafts

New South Wales Heritage Register
- Official name: Hastings; Thrupp's Cottage; Craignathan; The Hastings; Milton
- Type: State heritage (built)
- Designated: 2 April 1999
- Reference no.: 567
- Type: Other - residential buildings (private)
- Category: Residential buildings (private)

Hastings is a heritage-listed residence at 2 Hayes Street, Neutral Bay, New South Wales, a suburb of Sydney, Australia. The 1913 house was reputedly designed by Edward Jeaffreson Jackson and built from 1830 to 1913. It is also known as Thrupp's Cottage; Craignathan; The Hastings; Milton. The property is privately owned. It was added to the New South Wales State Heritage Register on 2 April 1999.

== History ==
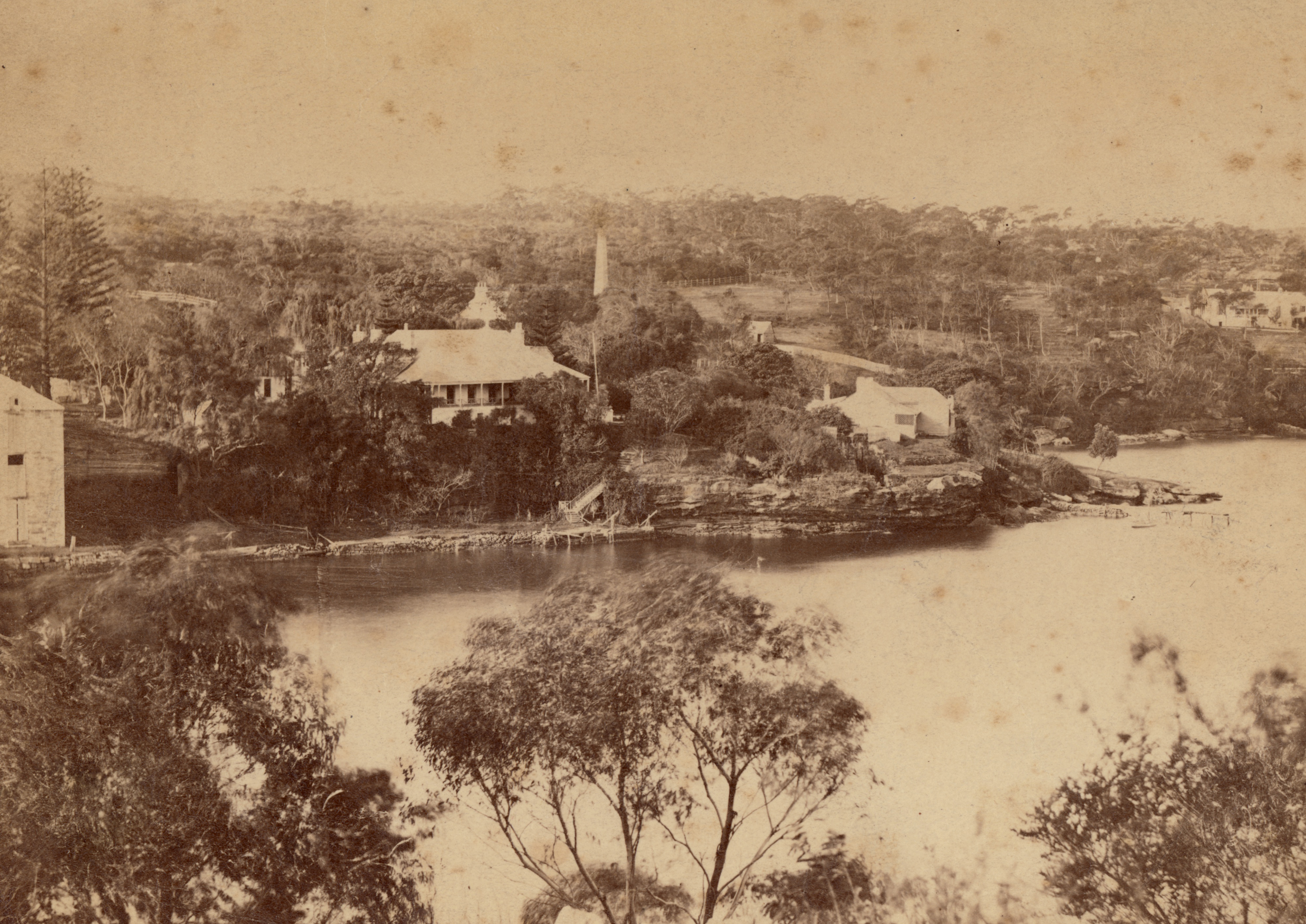
Ben Boyd's store at left, Craignathan residence, Thrupps Cottage at right, Neutral Bay, c. 1880

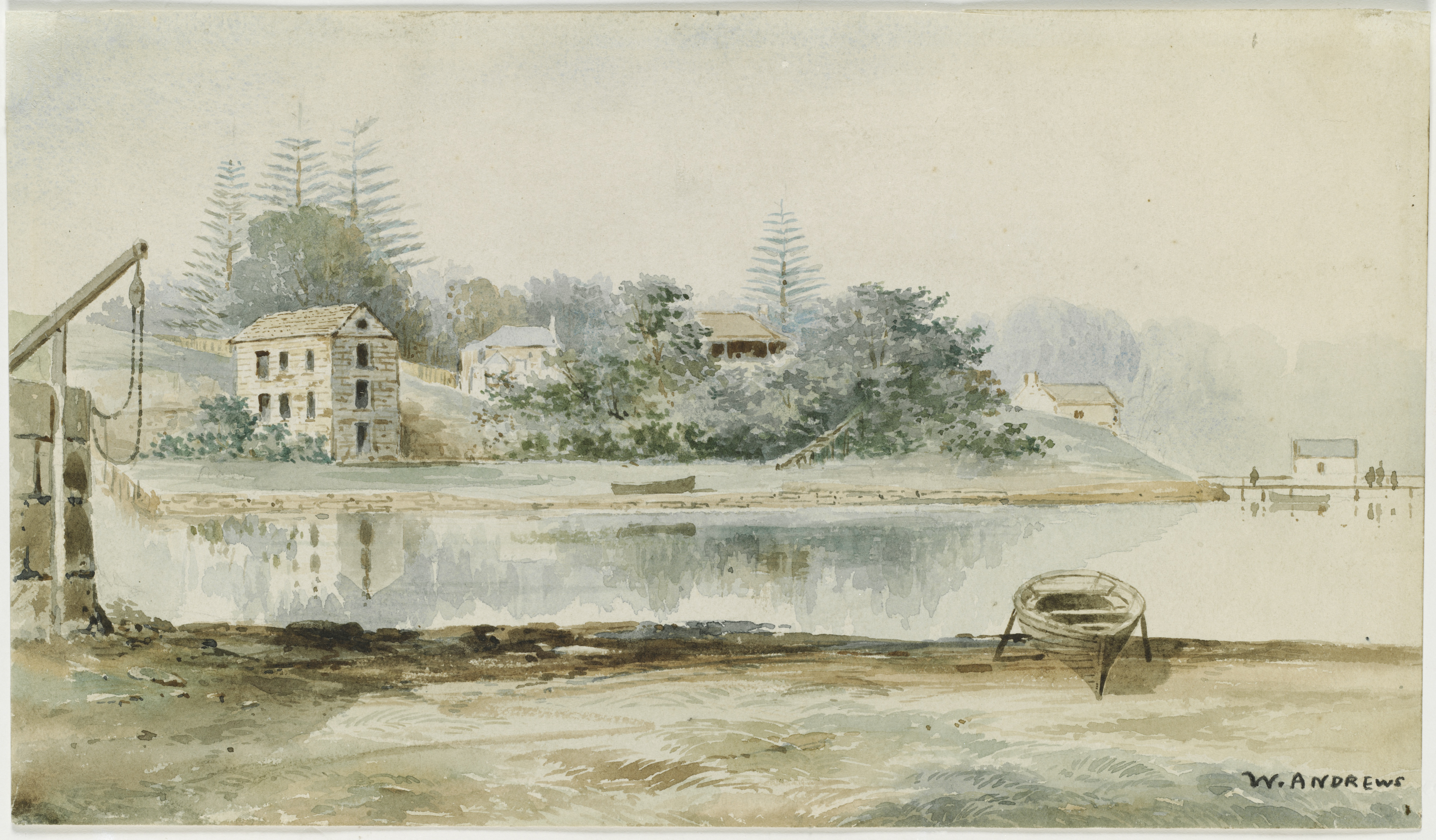
Craignathan (historic home), Neutral Bay, 1883, William Andrews

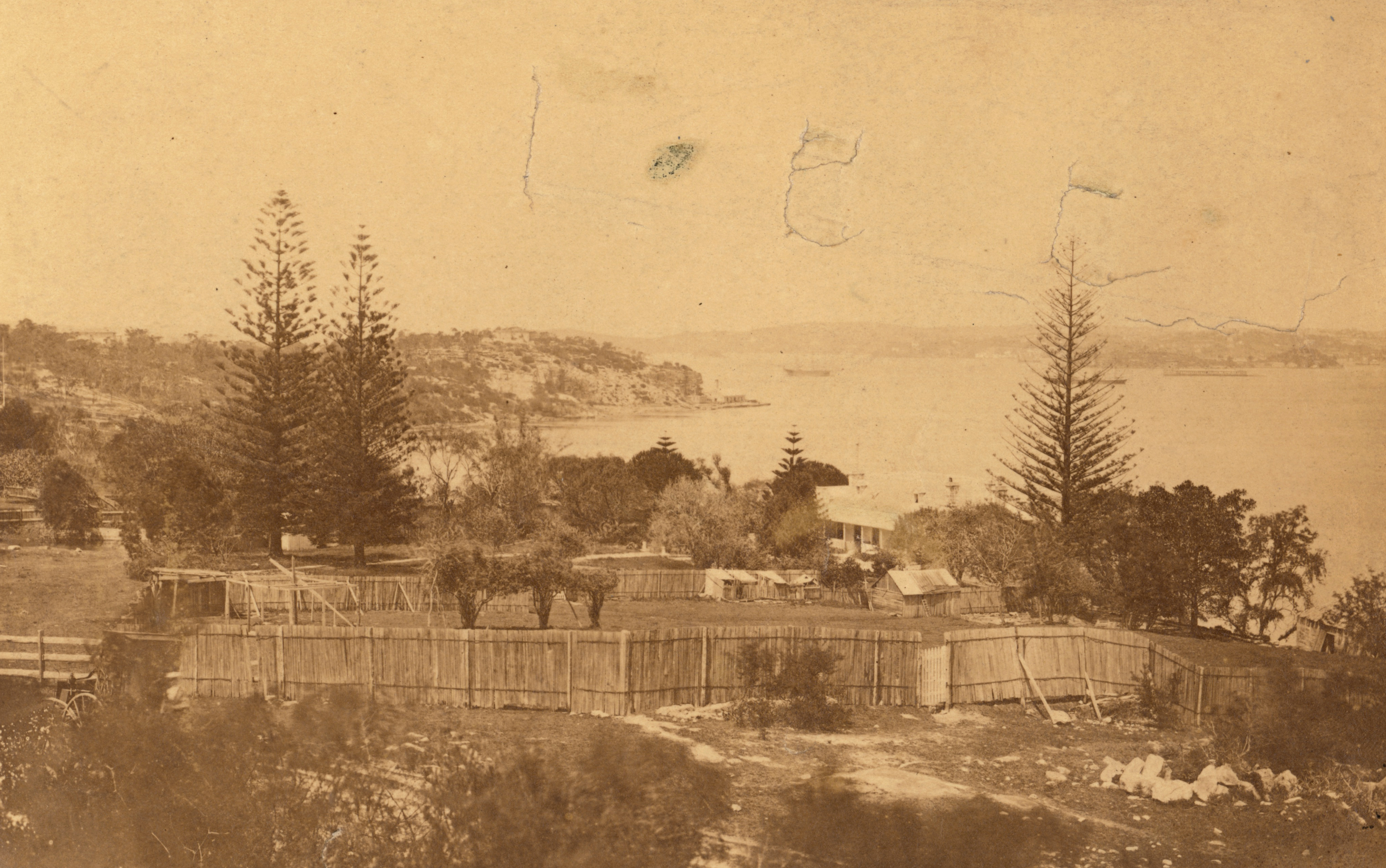
Corner of Craignathan property, Neutral Bay, 1875-1885

The site of Hastings, including earlier (remains of) houses, has important historical associations with a range of maritime industries, in particular whaling and also with pioneers such as Alfred Thrupp, John McLaren and Benjamin Boyd. The Hastings boarding house is indicative of the building boom of the early 1900s, which resulted in the creation of a coherent architectural styled suburb, the Federation Neutral Bay, for which, to this date, the suburb is well known. Being on the waterfront, Hastings formed a gateway to this important suburb and it would appear that it was probably one of the first large Federation period houses to have been erected on the northern foreshores of Sydney Harbour.

=== Garden ===
The site includes a stone wall which may be associated with "Thrupps Cottage" or "Craignathan" (1830s), both important early houses.

Within the grounds are several notable archaeological remains, including stone stairs which once lead to Thrupp's Cottage (possibly the earliest building on the North Shore), remains of a woolstore (built around 1831 and demolished 1884), remains of a reservoir and associated conduits constructed prior to 1842 and the cellar walls of Craignathan, one of the earliest of the more formal houses of the North Shore.

The following historic relics, located on the Hastings site, determine its cultural significance:

1. Thrupp's cottage remains;
2. the cellars of Craignathan;
3. the relics associated with whaling and other maritime activities, e.g. shipping of produce for storage in the woolstore.

=== House (1904-13) ===
The building "Hastings" is attributed to the architect E. Jefferson Jackson. Constructed in 1904 it was used primarily as a boarding house under various proprietors until 1956 when it was purchased by the Commonwealth of Australia. The Department of Defence purchased the property for use by the Royal Australian Air Force (RAAF) as a headquarters for its support units.

Hastings was substantially altered to accommodate the new military uses, with a considerable amount of structural alteration in the area now corresponding to Unit 3. A new porch and entry was added on the south side for the RAAF Chiefs of Staff and many internal changes were undertaken: removal of walls and parts of walls; blocking doors; and making new door openings. At this time the first floor did not extend as far west as it does now and there was no second floor on the western side of the building. It appears that the early ground floor additions of the late Federation period in this area were demolished during the period of occupation by the RAAF.

In the late 1980s the Australian Government disposed of the property. In October 1988 North Sydney Council approved a building application to convert Hastings into three apartments. The plans, prepared by Gary Rothwell, architect, show that the most significant changes occurring at the western part of the building to create Unit No. 3. Hastings the house was built between 1904–13, a large, dramatically designed Federation Arts and Crafts style house on an important harbourside site. Its design is attributed to noted architect E. Jeaffreson Jackson.

In 1989 approval was given for restoration works to Hastings and for landscaping works around it. Altered plans for landscaping work were approved in 1990. In 1995 approval was given for a new verandah. Craignathan manor was later replaced by an boutique block of six executive apartments. Approval was given in 2008 for alterations to 1st and 2nd floor including installation of lift, new balcony and extension of dining/living room. The same year approval was granted to extend dining and living space, enclose veranda, install lift, reconfigure stair, juliet balcony over extension, extend external retaining wall, landscape element relocations and addition to conservatory.

== Description ==
=== Site and area ===
This is an important harbourside site, part of the collection of large fine houses in the vicinity.

Occupying a prominent position on the northern foreshores of Sydney Harbour, Hastings is a conspicuous building, greeting ferry passengers arriving at Hayes Street Wharf and providing a pleasant backdrop to the harbourside reserve, shopping centre and ferry wharf. The site of Hastings, including earlier (remains of) houses, has important historical associations with a range of maritime industries, in particular whaling and also with pioneers such as Alfred Thrupp, John McLaren and Benjamin Boyd. The Hastings boarding house is indicative of the building boom of the early 1900s, which resulted in the creation of a coherent architectural styled suburb, the Federation Neutral Bay, for which, to this date, the suburb is well known. Being on the waterfront, Hastings formed a gateway to this important suburb and it would appear that it was probably one of the first large Federation period houses to have been erected on the northern foreshores of Sydney Harbour.

=== Garden ===
The site includes a stone wall which may be associated with "Thrupps Cottage" or "Craignathan" (1830s), both important early houses.

The site of Hastings, including (remains of) earlier houses, has important historical associations with a range of maritime industries, in particular whaling and also with pioneers such as Alfred Thrupp, John McLaren and Benjamin Boyd. Within the grounds are several notable archaeological remains, including stone stairs which once lead to Thrupp's Cottage (possibly the earliest building on the North Shore), remains of a woolstore (built around 1831 and demolished 1884), remains of a reservoir and associated conduits constructed prior to 1842 and the cellar walls of Craignathan, one of the earliest of the more formal houses of the North Shore.

Within the grounds are several notable archaeological remains, including:

- stone stairs which once lead to Thrupp's Cottage (possibly the earliest building on the North Shore);
- remains of a woolstore (built around 1831 and demolished 1884);
- remains of a reservoir and associated conduits constructed prior to 1842; and
- the cellar walls of Craignathan, one of the earliest of the more formal houses of the North Shore.

The following historic relics, located on the Hastings site, determine its cultural significance:

1. Thrupp's cottage remains;
2. the cellars of Craignathan;
3. the relics associated with whaling and other maritime activities, e.g. shipping of produce for storage in the woolstore.

=== House (1904-13) ===
A large, dramatically designed Federation Arts and Crafts style house. Its design is attributed to noted architect E Jeaffreson Jackson. It forms a part of the collection of large fine houses in the vicinity.

Two storey brick house with attic rooms below a multi-gabled roof of terracotta tiles. It features a roughcast rendered upper floor and square tower with battlemented parapet, bracketed, oriel windows, timber shingled gable ends, and sills and lintels and windows, dramatic arched brick verandah entries and timber slat balustrades to upper verandahs.

A fine example of Federation Arts and Crafts style, with asymmetrical composition and a steep roof with deep gables. The brick render and shingle facade treatment of the different levels provide textures and colour to the elevations. The bay windows and intricate joinery provide further interest and also relief to the formal facades. Occupying a prominent position on the northern foreshores of Sydney Harbour, Hastings is a conspicuous building, greeting ferry passengers arriving at Hayes Street Wharf and providing a pleasant backdrop to the harbourside reserve, shopping centre and ferry wharf. The Hastings boarding house is indicative of the building boom of the early 1900s, which resulted in the creation of a coherent architectural styled suburb, the Federation Neutral Bay, for which, to this date, the suburb is well known. Being on the waterfront, Hastings formed a gateway to this important suburb and it would appear that it was probably one of the first large Federation period houses to have been erected on the northern foreshores of Sydney Harbour.

A two-storey Federation Arts and Crafts style residential building (c. 1904) with much of its original details intact. It was built on the site of Thrupp's cottage, one of the earliest buildings on the North Shore and has been leased throughout the years as a high class boarding house. More recently it has been owned by the Commonwealth Government and used by the Department of Defence (Air Force). The house has been converted into units. The interior of Unit 4 is significantly modified. Unit 1 retains decorative features including plaster ceiling roses, cornices, joinery. Tesselated tiles on balcony.

Notwithstanding the substantial changes it has experienced, 2 Hayes Street presents as a fine example of the Federation period Arts and Crafts style. The additions and alterations in the 1980s have captured the characteristics of this distinctive style, maintaining the typical asymmetry and variations in the use of architectural forms and devices. To the extent that the new work blends so successfully with the retained original fabric and features the aesthetic and technical values of the building are somewhat false because it is only after a close inspection on site and study of drawings that the various phases of the buildings evolution can be understood.

=== Condition ===
The site still retains architectural evidence of earlier occupation in the form of stone steps associated with Thrupp's Cottage (possibly the oldest residence on the North Shore), remains of a woolstore (c. 1831), a reservoir and associated conduits (c. 1842) and, to the west, the stone cellar walls of Craignathan, also built and operated as an early twentieth century boarding house. The building's internal fabric has been substantially altered to convert it to three residential units, leaving no clear physical evidence of its origins as a boarding house or its use as the headquarters of the support units of the RAFF from 1956 to the mid-1980s.

However, the imposing presence of its exterior in this prominent location serves to preserve the record of its origins and use and the history of urban development along the northern shoreline of Sydney Harbour.

=== Modifications and dates ===
- 1956 – Purchased by the Commonwealth of Australia Department of Defence for use by the Royal Australian Air Force as a headquarters for its support units. Hastings was substantially altered to accommodate new military uses, with a considerable amount of structural alteration in the area now corresponding to Unit 3. A new porch and entry was added on the south side for the RAAF Chiefs of Staff and many internal changes were undertaken: removal of walls and parts of walls; blocking doors; and making new door openings. At this time the first floor did not extend as far west as it does now and there was no second floor on the western side of the building. It appears that the early ground floor additions of the late Federation period in this area were demolished during the period of occupation by the RAAF.
- Late 1980s – Commonwealth Government disposed of the property.
- October 1988 – North Sydney Council approved an application to convert "Hastings" into three apartments. The plans by Gary Rothwell, architect, show the most significant changes occurring at the western part to create Unit No. 3.
- The interior of Unit 4 is significantly modified. Unit 1 retains decorative features including plaster ceiling roses, cornices, joinery. Tesselated tiles on balcony.

== Heritage listing ==
Hastings was listed on the New South Wales State Heritage Register on 2 April 1999.

== See also ==
- Australian residential architectural styles
