= Robert Coates (actor) =

English eccentric and actor (1772–1848)

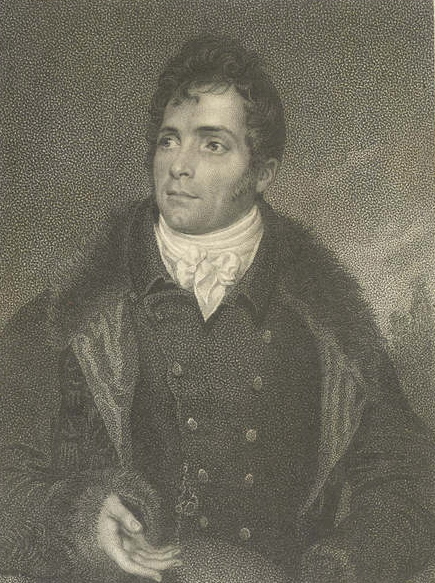
- Born: 1772; Antigua
- Died: 21 February 1848 (aged 75–76); London
- Resting place: Kensal Green Cemetery
- Other names: Romeo, Diamond Coates, the Celebrated Philanthropic Amateur
- Years active: 1809–1816
- Known for: Eccentric amateur acting
- Spouse: Emma Anne Robinson (m. 1823)
- Children: 2

Robert "Romeo" Coates (1772 – 21 February 1848) was an English eccentric, best remembered for his career as an amateur actor. He was known for a highly mistaken belief in his own thespian prowess, including dubious claims to be the best actor in Britain. Born in Antigua in the West Indies and educated in England, he began to appear in plays in Bath in 1809, and became notorious for his fondness for appearing in leading roles. His favourite role was Romeo in Shakespeare's Romeo and Juliet, hence his widely used nickname. After professional theatrical producers failed to cast Coates in roles prominent enough to satisfy him, he used his family fortune to subsidise his own productions in which he was both the producer and the lead actor.

When performing in plays, Coates would appear in bizarre costumes of his own design, invent new scenes and dialogue mid-show, and repeat parts of the play he particularly liked—usually dramatic death scenes—up to three or four times a night. His fame quickly spread, and people flocked to see whether Coates was really as bad as they had heard. They laughed, jeered, and pelted him; Coates sometimes turned to the audience and answered in kind. By 1816, audiences had tired of mocking Coates, and theatre managers became no longer willing to let him use their premises. After some years living in France to avoid creditors, he returned to England, married in 1823, and had two children who both predeceased him. Coates died in London in 1848, aged about 76, after a Hansom cab driver hit him outside the Theatre Royal, Drury Lane.

== Biography ==
=== Actor ===
Robert Coates was born in Antigua in the West Indies, the only surviving child of wealthy sugar planter Alexander Coates and his wife Dorothy. He was educated in England, and on returning to Antigua took part in amateur acting. When he inherited his father's estate and a large collection of diamonds in 1807, he moved to Bath, England, where he lived as a man of fashion. He eventually drew the attention of the manager of the Theatre Royal, Bath and began to appear in plays in 1809, though not as a professional actor.

Coates soon appeared in Romeo and Juliet in the part of Romeo, wearing a costume of his own design. The costume had a flowing, sky-blue cloak with sequins, red pantaloons, a vest of white muslin, a large cravat, and a plumed "opera hat", according to Captain Rees Howell Gronow. It also included dozens of diamonds, which was highly unsuitable for the part. The garments were too small for Coates and caused him to move stiffly, and at one point the seat of his pants split open, which caused the audience to roar with laughter. During his first performance of Romeo & Juliet, he pulled out his snuff box in the middle of a scene and offered some to the occupants of a box. Then, during Romeo's death scene, Coates carefully placed his hat on the ground for a pillow and used his dirty handkerchief to dust the stage before lying on it. Finally, at the invitation of the audience, he acted out Romeo's death twice—and was about to attempt a third before his Juliet came back to life and interrupted him.

Despite this ridicule, Coates went on to tour the British Isles. If a theatre manager hesitated to let him display his dubious talents, he would bribe them. Managers, in turn, often called in the police in case things went seriously wrong.

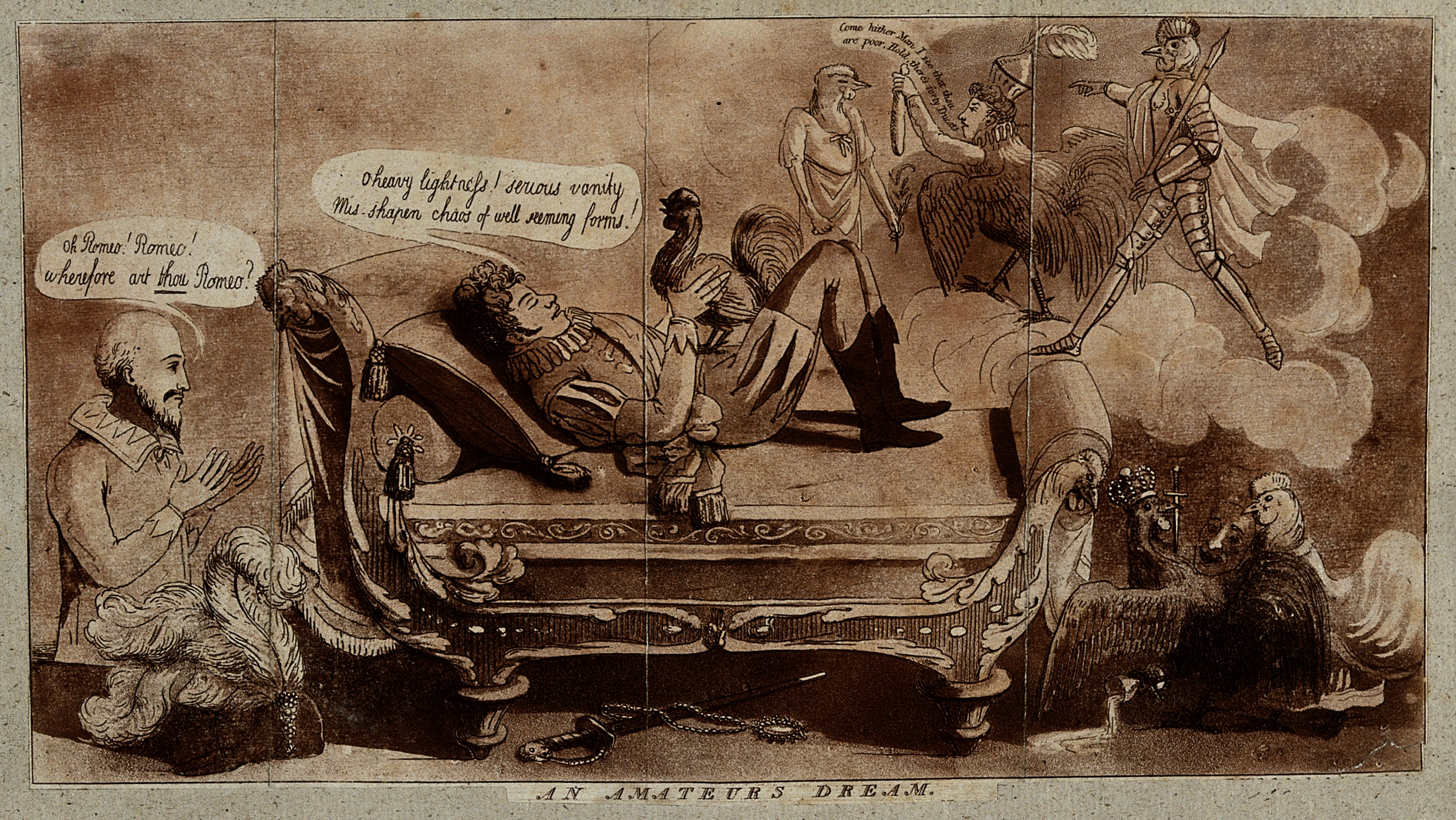
Robert Coates, "The Caricaturist General", 1812.

Coates claimed to be convinced that he was the best actor in business. He frequently forgot his lines and invented new scenes and dialogue on the spot. He loved dramatic death scenes and would repeat them, or any other scenes he happened to take a fancy to, three to four times over. Once, when he dropped a diamond buckle just before he was going to exit the stage, he crawled around the stage looking for it.

Coates claimed that he wanted to improve the classics. At the end of his first appearance as Romeo, he came back in with a crowbar and tried to pry open Capulet's tomb. In another of his antics, he made the actress playing Juliet so embarrassed that she clung to a pillar and refused to leave the stage. Eventually, no actress would agree to play the part with him.

The audience usually responded to Coates' behaviour with angered catcalls, embarrassed jeering, a large pelting of orange peels, and a great deal of laughter, upon which his fellow actors would try to make him leave the stage. If Coates thought the audience was getting out of hand, he turned to them and answered in kind.

Coates' fame spread, and people would flock to see whether he really was as bad as they had heard. For unclear reasons, Baron Ferdinand de Géramb became his foremost supporter. Even Prince Regent and future King George Augustus Frederick would go to see him. In 1811, when Coates played the part of Lothario in The Fair Penitent in London's Haymarket Theatre, the theatre had to turn thousands of would-be spectators away. In another performance in Richmond, Surrey, several audience members had to be treated for excessive laughter.

There is question as to whether Coates believed he was a great actor as he claimed, or if his performances were actually deliberate parody.

=== Offstage ===
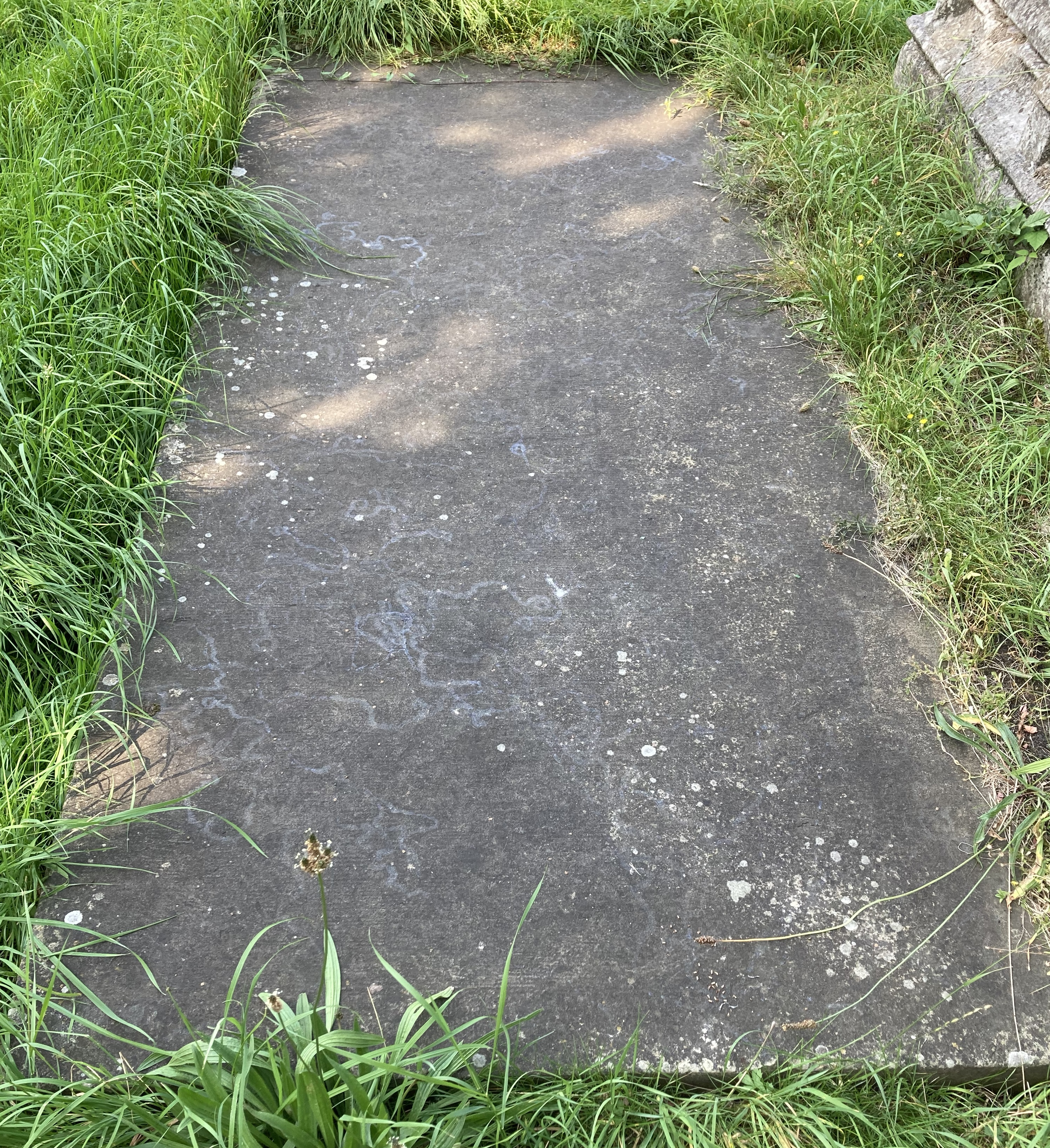
Grave of Robert Coates in Kensal Green Cemetery

Coates tried to amaze the public with his taste in clothing offstage as well. He wore furs even in hot weather. He would go out in a custom-built carriage with a heraldic badge of a crowing rooster and the motto While I live, I'll crow. At receptions, he glittered from head to toe with diamond buttons and buckles. His predilection for diamonds of all kinds gave him the nickname "Diamond Coates".

Coates was the victim of a prank orchestrated by Theodore Hook, who had famously coordinated the Berners Street hoax in 1810, a few years before. The Prince Regent and future King George Augustus Frederick was at the time holding "a fête of surpassing magnificence" at Carlton House; imitating the chamberlain's handwriting, Hook produced a ticket "commanding the presence of Signor Romeo" and, dressing himself in fine scarlet livery, delivered the flattering fake invitation to Coates in person. Hook waited to watch Coates embark for the event in his carriage, "bedizened in all his finery, with a diamond-hilted sword and the air of Louis le Grand". Coates was invited in, but on examination of the ticket was "politely informed that a mistake had occurred" and turned away. Having sent off his carriage, he was obliged to wait at the Hackney carriage stand in order to be able to return. The prince, unwittingly involved in Hook's prank, regretted that Coates had been turned away, considering him an "inoffensive gentleman" and noting that "his presence might have amused many of the guests, and could have done harm to no one." The prince sent his secretary the next day, inviting Coates to come and look at the "arrangements and ornaments" which were still all in place; Coates duly went. It was observed of Hook that he "never told the story without some signs of compunction."

Coates was never a professional actor, and made his stage appearances in support of charitable causes: his nickname of choice was 'the Celebrated Philanthropic Amateur'. His stage career ended for good by 1816; audiences were bored of him and stopped attending in large numbers, and theater directors subsequently barred him from any further appearances. He eventually fell into debt so severe that he fled his creditors and moved to Boulogne-sur-Mer, where he met Emma Anne Robinson, daughter of a naval lieutenant. After Coates got his finances in better order, they returned to England and were married on 6 September 1823. The two lived quietly in London, finally living at 28 Montagu Square. They had two children, both of whom predeceased him. Emma remarried in the year of Coates's death, her second husband being Mark Boyd.

Coates died in London in 1848. He had been caught and crushed between a Hansom cab and a private carriage as he was leaving a performance at the Theatre Royal, Drury Lane on 15 February, and died at home six days later. At his inquest, the coroner brought in a verdict of manslaughter by person or persons unknown. He is buried in an unmarked grave in Kensal Green Cemetery.

== See also ==
- William McGonagall
- Florence Foster Jenkins
- Ed Wood
- Tommy Wiseau
- Mrs. Miller
- Legendary Stardust Cowboy
