= Mark Boyd (author) =

- Born: 1805; Surrey, England
- Died: September 12, 1879 (aged 73–74); London, England
- Occupations: Writer, businessman, insurance director
- Spouse: Emma Anne (m. 1848)
- Relatives: Benjamin Boyd (brother)
- Writing career
- Genres: Reminiscences, social observations
- Notable work: Reminiscences of Fifty Years (1871); Social Gleanings (1875)

Mark Boyd (1805 – 12 September 1879, in London) was an English writer.

Mark Boyd was born in Surrey near the Thames, the younger son of Edward Boyd of Merton Hall, Newton Stewart, Wigtownshire, a merchant. His brother was Benjamin Boyd. He mainly spent his childhood on the Scottish estate, which was near the River Cree. He later pursued an active business career in London, becoming London director of a Scottish insurance society, and a lively promoter of the colonisation of Australia and New Zealand, and of other useful public undertakings. He travelled much in Europe. He published an account in the London and Shetland Journal of a journey in the Orkney Isles in 1839. On 23 December 1848 he married Emma Anne, the widow of 'Romeo' Coates, who had been run over and killed in the previous February. He died at the Alexandra Hotel, Hyde Park on 12 September 1879, aged 74.

== Works ==
In 1864 Boyd published a pamphlet about Australia, where his disgraced fraudulent slaver brother had settled. His Reminiscences of Fifty Years (1871) was dedicated to the Australian colonists, and Social Gleanings (1875, written from Oatlands, Walton-on-Thames) was dedicated to Dean Ramsay.
