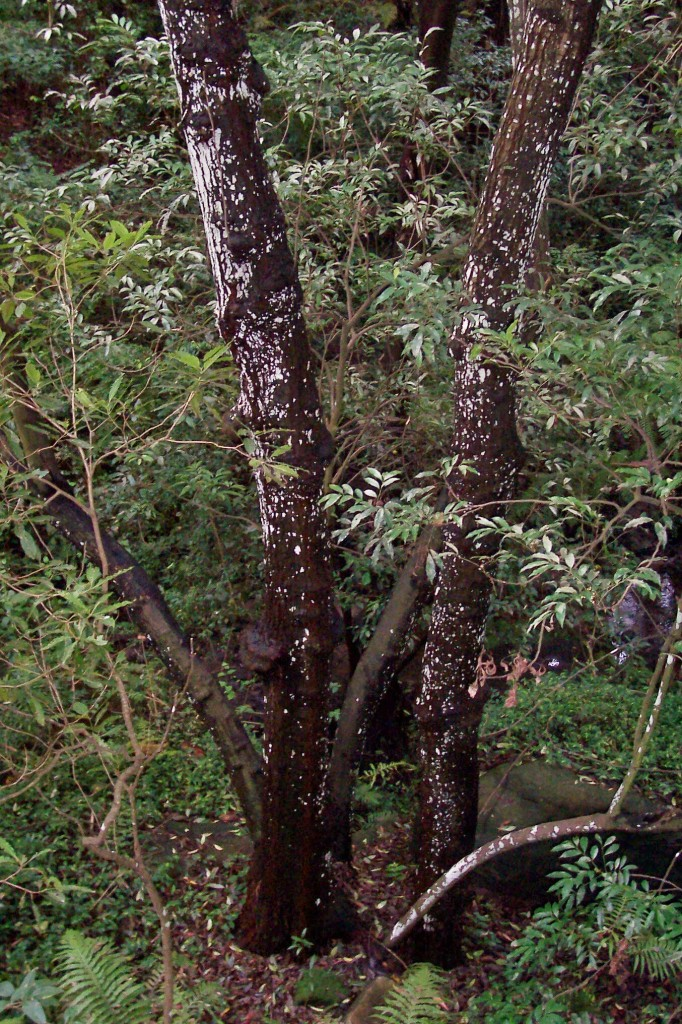
- Synoum glandulosum - Chatswood West, Australia

Scientific classification
- Kingdom: Plantae
- Clade: Tracheophytes
- Clade: Angiosperms
- Clade: Eudicots
- Clade: Rosids
- Order: Sapindales
- Family: Meliaceae
- Subfamily: Melioideae
- Genus: Synoum; A.Juss.
- Species: S. glandulosum

Binomial name
- Synoum glandulosum (Sm.) A.Juss.

= Synoum =

Genus of trees

Synoum is a monotypic genus of evergreen tree belonging to the family Meliaceae. It is endemic to Australia where it is found along the eastern sub-tropical to tropical coast, usually on the margins of rainforests, in Queensland and New South Wales.

The genus was originally described by French naturalist Adrien-Henri de Jussieu in 1830.

The only species recognized is Synoum glandulosum, known commonly as scentless rosewood. It resembles the related Toona, except that the leaves have 5-9 leaflets, whereas Toona has 8-20. Its fruit matures December to January and is a reddish three-lobed capsule that contains two or three seeds surrounded by a red aril. Germination from fresh seed is reliable and relatively fast. It is dioecious, with male and female flowers on separate plants.

The timber of Synoum is used in local construction as sawn timber for general house framing, flooring, mouldings and joinery. It is also used for furniture, shop and office fixtures, panelling, turnery, carving, as structural plywood, scaffold planks, wood wool, paper products, particleboard, and medium density fibreboard.

== Gallery ==
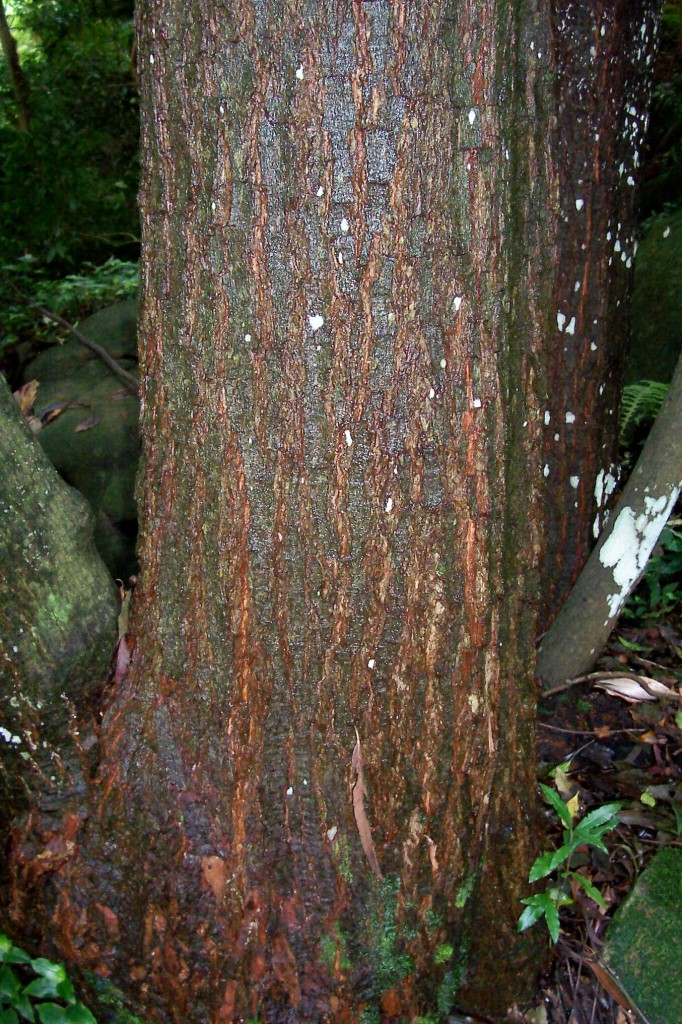
Bark on a large Synoum tree

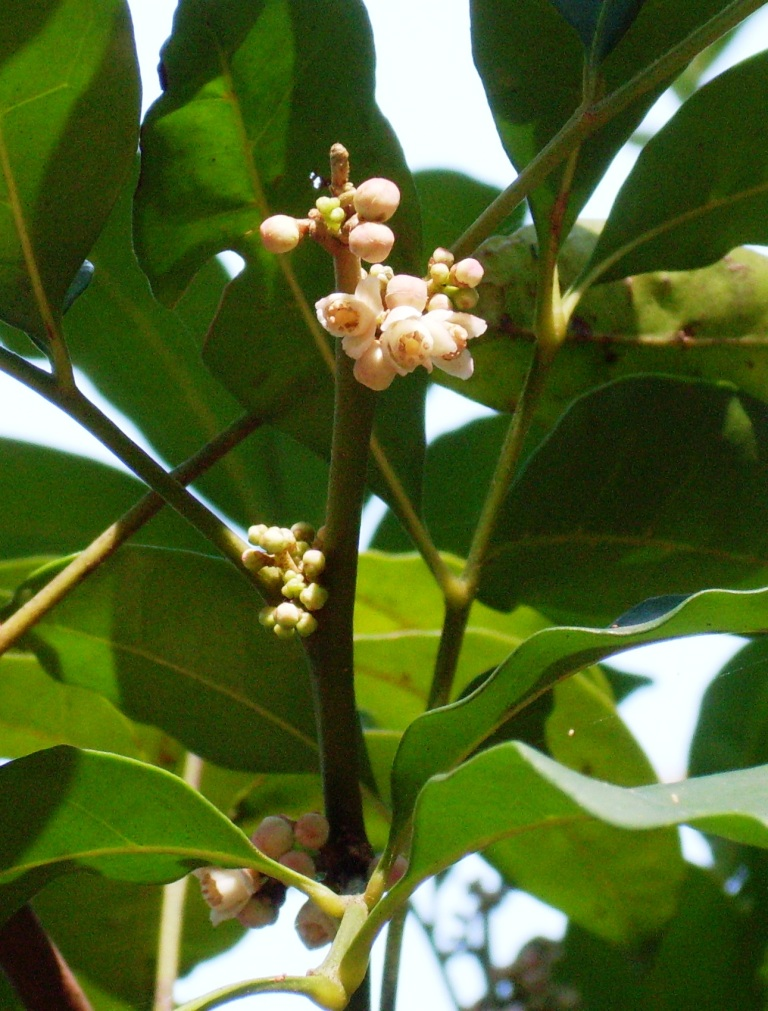
Synoum flower buds

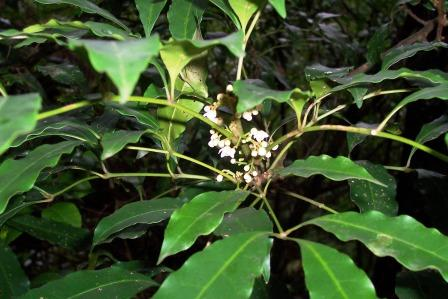
Synoum flowers
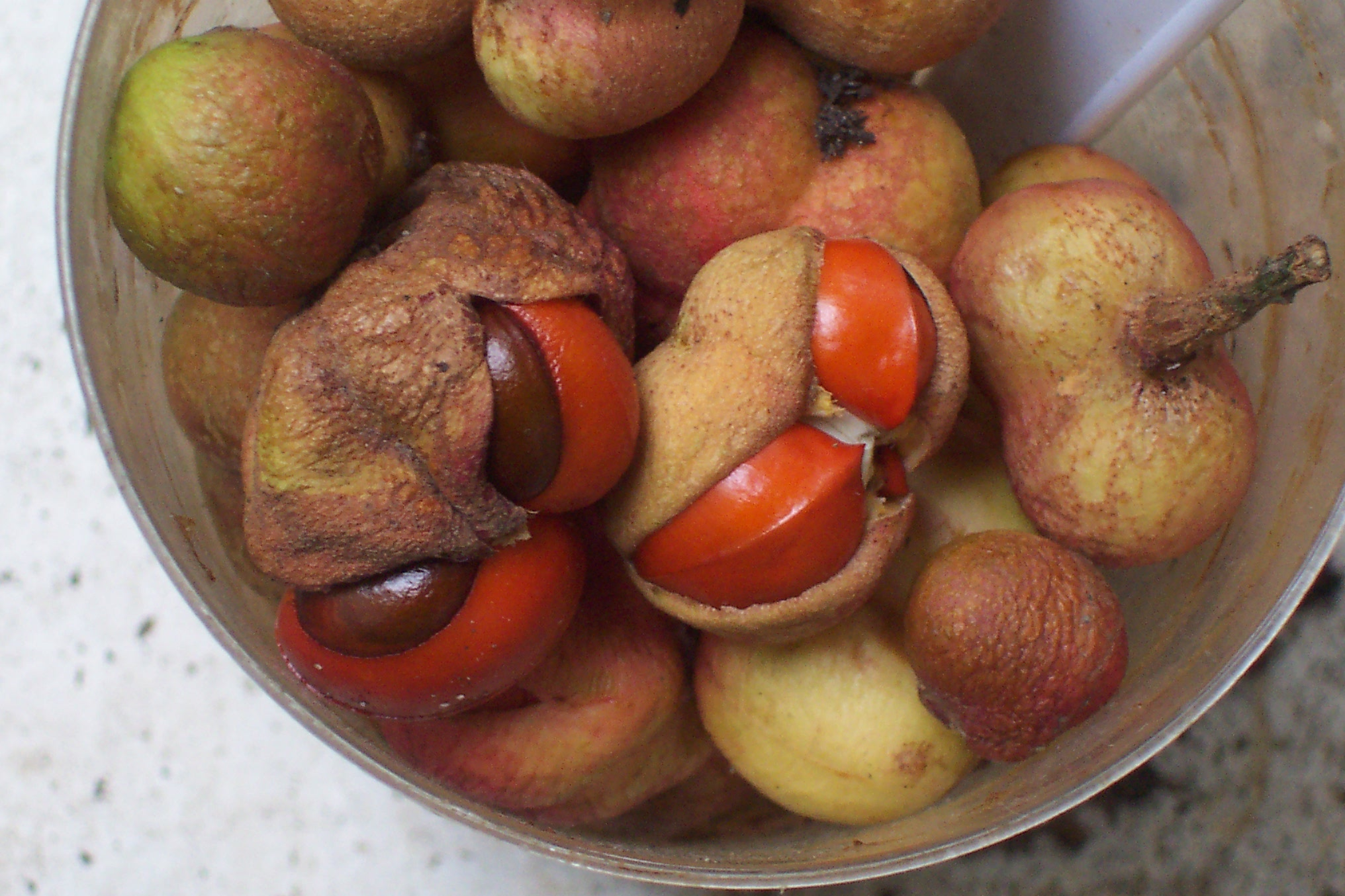
Synoum fruit

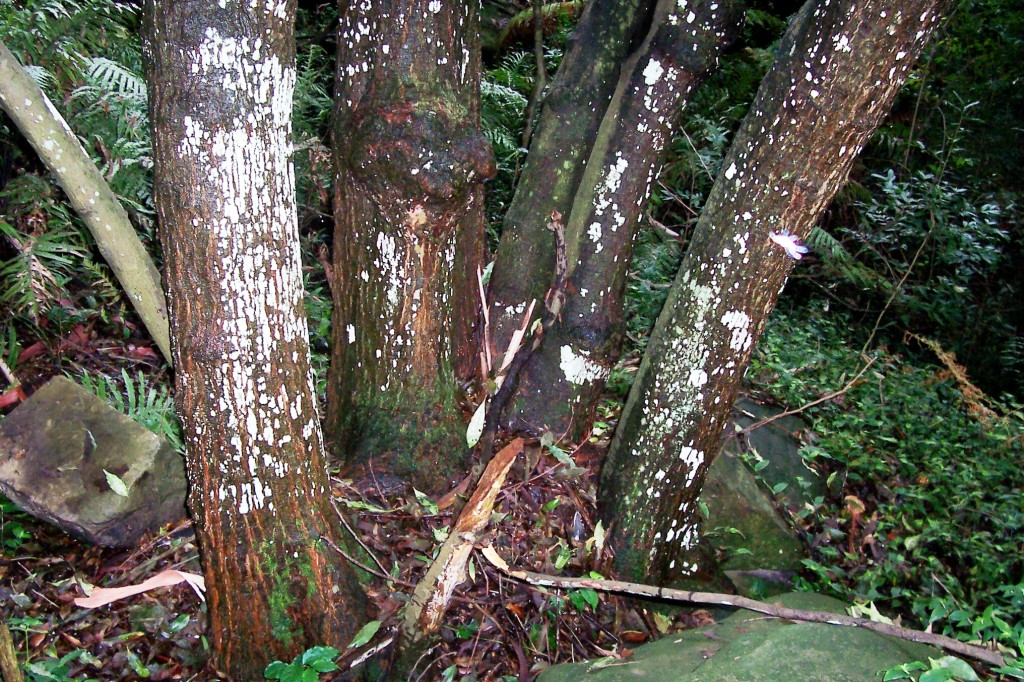
Base of a 15-metre-tall (49 ft) Synoum

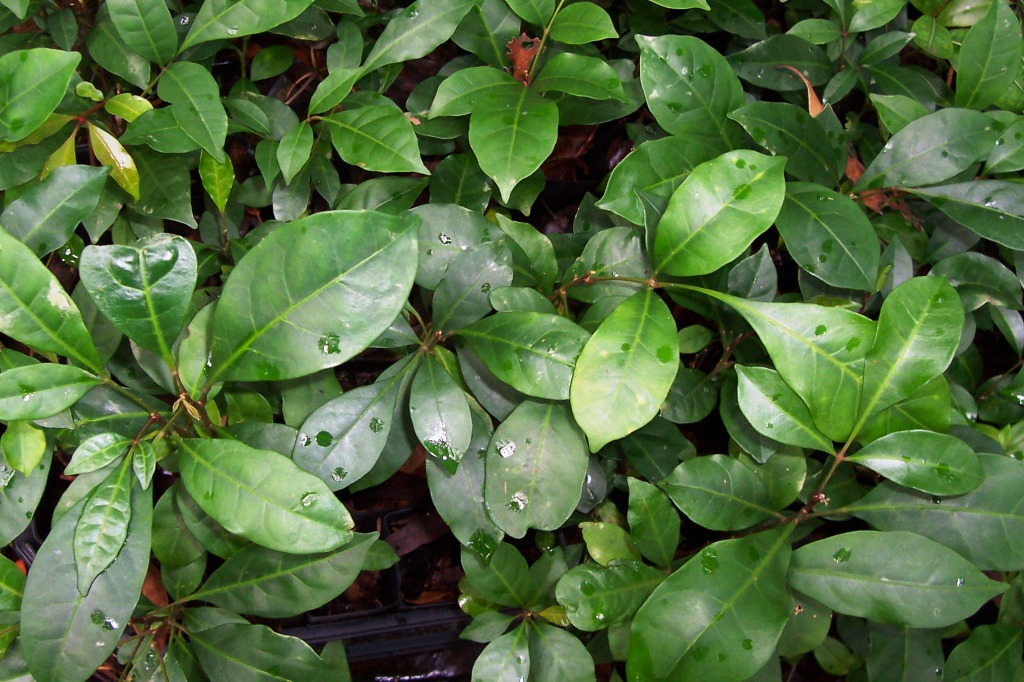
Synoum - juvenile foliage
