= List of University of Sydney people =

This is a list of University of Sydney people, including notable alumni and staff.

== Alumni ==
=== Academia ===
- Dennis A. Ahlburg – former president of Trinity University; dean of the Leeds School of Business at the University of Colorado at Boulder and Professor of Human Resources at the Carlson School of Management at the University of Minnesota
- Brian Anderson – former president of the Australian Academy of Science; emeritus Professor of Electrical Engineering at the Australian National University
- Elizabeth Bannan – educationist; fellow of the Australian College of Education
- Max Brennan – former Chief Scientist of South Australia
- Brian L. Byrne – social scientist known for research in psycholinguistics; emeritus Professor of Psychology at the University of New England
- Leonie Byrnes – educator and school inspector
- Jill Ker Conway – former vice-president of the University of Toronto and President of Smith College; Visiting professor in MIT's program in Science, Technology, and Society; Chairman of Lendlease; director of Nike, Merrill Lynch, and Colgate-Palmolive
- Beverly Derewianka – Emeritus Professor of Linguistics at the University of Wollongong
- Theodore Thomson Flynn – professor of marine biology and zoology at the University of Tasmania and Queen's University of Belfast, Chair of Zoology at Queen's University of Belfast, director of the marine station at Portaferry, father of actor Errol Flynn
- Margaret Gardner – Governor of Victoria, Vice-Chancellor of Monash University, President and Vice-Chancellor of RMIT University
- Michael Halliday – creator of the systemic functional grammar, an internationally influential grammar model
- Jenny Hammond – linguist known for research on literacy development
- Frank Lancaster Jones – sociologist known for research on social inequality, social stratification, social mobility, and national identity
- Sir Robert Madgwick – first Vice-Chancellor of the University of New England; former chairman of the Australian Broadcasting Commission; Director of the Australian Army Education Service during World War II
- Robert May, Baron May of Oxford – former president of the Royal Society; Chief Scientific Adviser to the UK Government
- Carmel O'Shannessy – linguistics professor at the Australian National University
- Jim Peacock – former president of Australian Academy of Science
- Michael Pitman – former chief scientist of Australia
- Ken Robinson – former head of the Department of Computer Science at the University of New South Wales
- Nicholas Saunders – former vice-chancellor of the University of Newcastle and former dean of medicine at Monash University and Flinders University
- Catherine Drummond Smith – one of first two female geologists hired by University of Sydney as demonstrators
- Michael Spence – president and provost of the University College London and former vice-chancellor and Principal of the University of Sydney
- Sir Brian Windeyer – former dean of the Middlesex Hospital Medical School at the University of London and former vice-chancellor of the University of London
- Nicki Packer – Distinguished Professor of Glycoproteomics at Macquarie University

=== Architecture ===
- Andrew Andersons
- John Andrews
- Arthur Baldwinson
- Marion Hall Best
- Louise Cox
- Philip Cox
- Eleanor Cullis-Hill
- Neville Gruzman
- Peter Kollar
- Richard Leplastrier
- Andrea Nield
- Paul Pholeros
- Penelope Seidler
- Alexander Tzannes
- Leslie Wilkinson
- Ken Woolley

=== Business ===
- Matt Barrie – CEO of Freelancer.com
- David S. Clarke – former Chairman of Macquarie Group
- Cameron Clyne – former CEO of National Australia Bank
- Matt Comyn – CEO of Commonwealth Bank
- James Curran – former CEO of Grok Academy
- Robyn Denholm – Chairwoman of Tesla
- John Grill – Chairman of WorleyParsons
- Angus Harris – Co-CEO of Harris Farm Markets
- David Higgins – Chairman of United Utilities Group
- Fred Hilmer – former director and Deputy Chairman of Westfield Group
- Michael Hintze, Baron Hintze – founder and Executive Chairman of CQS
- Ryan Junee – founder and CEO of Omnisio and Inporia
- Jeni Klugman – former director of the Human Development Report Office, United Nations Development Programme
- Jim Millner – former chairman of Soul Patts
- Allan Moss – former Managing Director/CEO of Macquarie Group
- John Mulcahy – former CEO of Suncorp-Metway
- Michael Patsalos-Fox – Chairman of McKinsey & Company in America
- Mark Scott – former CEO of Australian Broadcasting Corporation
- Glenn Stevens – former Governor of the Reserve Bank of Australia
- Matt Sweeny – CEO and co-founder of Flirtey, inventor
- Tom Waterhouse – former CEO of William Hill Australia
- Sir James Wolfensohn – former President of the World Bank

=== Community activism ===
- Eva Maria Cox
- Germaine Greer
- Noel Pearson
- Charles Perkins

=== Government ===
==== Royalty ====
- Sikhanyiso Dlamini – Princess of Swaziland
- Taufa'ahau Tupou IV – King of Tonga
- Princess Ingrid Alexandra – Princess of Norway

==== Governors-General of Australia ====
- Sir William Deane
- Sir John Kerr

==== State governors and Territory Administrators ====
- Dame Marie Bashir (NSW)
- Richard Butler (Tas)
- Peter Coleman (NF)
- Sir Roden Cutler (NSW)
- Tom Pauling (NT)
- Sir James Plimsoll (Tas)
- Sir James Rowland (NSW)

==== Politicians ====
===== Prime ministers of Australia =====
- Tony Abbott
- Anthony Albanese
- Sir Edmund Barton
- John Howard
- Sir William McMahon
- Sir Earle Page
- Malcolm Turnbull
- Gough Whitlam

===== Premiers of New South Wales =====
- Mike Baird
- Gladys Berejiklian
- Sir Thomas Bavin
- Sir Joseph Carruthers
- John Fahey
- Sir George Fuller
- Nick Greiner
- Morris Iemma
- James McGirr
- Dominic Perrottet
- Nathan Rees
- Sir Eric Willis
- Neville Wran

===== Federal politicians =====
- Ash Ambihaipahar
- John Anderson
- Sir Garfield Barwick
- Lionel Bowen
- Sir Nigel Bowen
- Sir Percy Spender
- Kerry Bartlett
- Chris Bowen
- Bob Brown
- Ross Cameron
- Peter Coleman
- Craig Emerson
- Laurie Ferguson
- Martin Ferguson
- Carina Garland
- Jennie George
- Joe Hockey
- Tom Hughes
- Ros Kelly
- Peter King
- Andrew Laming
- Mark Latham
- Robert McClelland
- Daryl Melham
- Tsebin Tchen
- Danna Vale
- Andrew Charlton
- Angus Taylor
- Tanya Plibersek
- Peter Garrett
- Robert McClelland

===== Australian state and territory politicians =====
- Clare Martin (NT)
- George Thorn (QLD)
- Max Willis (NSW)

===== International politicians =====
- Natalie Bennett, Baroness Bennett of Manor Castle – former leader of the Green Party of England and Wales
- H. V. Evatt – 3rd President of the United Nations General Assembly
- Trixie Gardner, Baroness Gardner of Parkes – member of the House of Lords of the United Kingdom
- John Horgan – 36th Canadian Premier of British Columbia
- Martin Indyk – former United States Ambassador to Israel
- Dave Sharma – former Australia Ambassador to Israel
- Alvin Tan – Minister of State of Singapore
- Teh Cheang Wan – former Minister of National Development of Singapore
- Catherine West – member of the House of Commons of the United Kingdom
- Akhilesh Yadav – 20th Chief Minister of Uttar Pradesh of India
- Roderick Yong – 7th Secretary-General of ASEAN

===== Lord mayors of the City of Sydney =====
- Sir Emmet McDermott
- Nelson Meers
- Clover Moore
- Frank Sartor
- Lucy Turnbull

==== Public servants ====
- Tony Cole – 13th Secretary of the Department of the Treasury
- Michael Cranston — former deputy commissioner of the Australian Taxation Office
- Philip Flood – 5th Secretary of the Department of Foreign Affairs and Trade
- Neil McInnes – intellectual, journalist and senior public servant
- Ewart Smith – campaigner against the Australia Card

=== Humanities ===
==== Arts ====
- John Bell – actor, theatre director and theatre impresario
- Bruce Beresford – film director
- Anne Boyd – composer, first Australian and first woman appointed Professor of Music at the University of Sydney
- Rose Byrne – actress
- Jane Campion – New Zealand director, producer, and screenwriter
- Alex Cubis – actor
- Somaratne Dissanayake – Sri Lankan film director, screenwriter and producer
- Christopher Doyle – cinematographer
- Sandy Edwards – photographer
- Jacqueline Fernandez – Bahraini–Sri Lankan actress and model who predominantly works in Bollywood, Miss Universe Sri Lanka 2006
- Charles Firth – comedian
- John Flaus – broadcaster, actor, voice talent, anarchist, poet and raconteur
- Ania Freer – documentary filmmaker
- Andrew Hansen – comedian and musician
- Michael Hannan – composer, pianist, and musicologist
- Tom Gleeson – comedian, radio and television presenter
- May Hollinworth – theatre producer and director
- Yvonne Kenny – soprano
- Chas Licciardello – comedian
- Dolph Lundgren – Swedish actor, filmmaker, and martial artist
- Julian Morrow – comedian and television producer
- Craig Reucassel – comedian, radio and television presenter
- Dame Joan Sutherland – dramatic coloratura soprano
- Chris Taylor – comedian
- Huỳnh Trần Ý Nhi – Vietnamese model, Miss World Vietnam 2023
- Peter Weir – film director
- Kip Williams – director of the Sydney Theatre Company
- Georgina Wilson – Filipino-British model, actress
- Roger Woodward – pianist, composer, conductor
- Whitney Duan – artist

==== History ====
- Alan Atkinson
- Carl Bridge
- Sir Christopher Clark
- Peter Loveday (historian)
- Anne Philomena O'Brien
- John Manning Ward

==== Journalism ====
- Phillip Adams
- Bob Ellis
- Elizabeth Fell
- Eliza Harvey
- Robert Hughes
- Clive James
- Paul Kelly
- Ray Martin
- Richard McGregor
- Jessica Rowe
- Lillian Roxon
- Adam Spencer
- Avani Dias

==== Literature, writing and poetry ====
- Millicent Armstrong
- Nikos Athanasou
- Clive Stephen Barry
- Dora Birtles
- Christopher Brennan
- Geraldine Brooks – winner of the Pulitzer Prize (2006)
- Dymphna Cusack
- Brook Emery — poet, educator
- Germaine Greer
- Kate Grenville
- A. D. Hope
- Geoffrey Lehmann
- Dominic Knight
- Niall Lucy
- Jeni Mawter
- Les Murray
- Jennifer Rowe
- James Roy
- Margaret Clunies Ross
- Pierre Ryckmans (Simon Leys)
- Kimberley Starr

==== Philosophy ====
- David Malet Armstrong
- Stephen Hetherington
- Peter Godfrey-Smith
- J. L. Mackie
- John Passmore
- Wesley Wildman

==== Law ====
- Sir Robert Garran
- Sir Edmund Barton
- Sir Garfield Barwick
- Tom Bathurst
- Virginia Bell
- Sir Maurice Byers
- Susan Crennan
- Sir William Portus Cullen
- Sir William Deane
- H. V. Evatt
- Mary Gaudron
- Murray Gleeson
- Sir Samuel Griffith
- William Gummow
- Sir Leslie Herron
- Dyson Heydon
- Sir Kenneth Jacobs
- Sir Lawrence Jackson
- Sir Frederick Jordan
- Sir John Kerr
- Michael Kirby
- Sir Frank Kitto
- Hugh Macrossan
- Sir Alan Mansfield
- Sir Anthony Mason
- Michael McHugh
- Sir Edward McTiernan
- Lionel Murphy
- Richard O'Connor
- Albert Piddington
- Sir George Rich
- Sir Percy Spender
- James Spigelman
- Sir Kenneth Whistler Street
- Sir Laurence Whistler Street
- Sir Philip Whistler Street
- Sir Alan Taylor
- Sir Cyril Walsh
- Sir Dudley Williams
- Sir Victor Windeyer

===== Other legal professionals =====
- Hugh Atkin – lawyer, former Tipstaff at the Supreme Court of New South Wales
- John Davies – Judge of the United States District Court
- Marcus Einfeld – Judge of the Federal Court of Australia
- Geoffrey Robertson – international human rights lawyer
- Charles Waterstreet – criminal defence lawyer, writer and producer

=== Military ===
- Lieutenant General Sir Frank Berryman – Deputy Chief of the General Staff
- Major-General John Broadbent
- Major-General Paul Brereton – Head of the Cadet, Reserve and Employer Support Division
- Lieutenant General Sir Mervyn Brogan – Chief of the General Staff
- Brigadier Sir Frederick Oliver Chilton
- Roden Cutler
- Major-General Sir Ivan Dougherty
- Major-General W B "Digger" James – Director-General of Army Medical Services
- Lieutenant General Sir Carl Jess – Director-General of Repatriation
- Captain Gordon Grimsley King
- Lieutenant General James Legge – Chief of the General Staff
- Percy Storkey
- Major General Mervyn Tan – Chief of Air Force of the Republic of Singapore Air Force
- Major-General Sir Victor Windeyer

=== Religious leaders ===
- Leo Ash – Bishop of Rockhampton
- Neville Chynoweth – Bishop of Gippsland
- Geoffrey Cranswick – Bishop of Tasmania
- George Cranswick – Bishop of Gippsland
- Hubert Cunliffe-Jones – former chairman of the Congregational Union of England and Wales
- Edwin Davidson – Bishop of Gippsland
- Glenn Davies – Archbishop of Sydney
- Anthony Fisher – Archbishop of Sydney
- Robert Forsyth – Bishop of South Sydney
- David Garnsey – Bishop of Gippsland
- Eric Gowing – Bishop of Auckland
- Arthur Green – Bishop of Ballarat
- William Hilliard – Bishop of Nelson
- Peter Jensen – Archbishop of Sydney
- Clive Kerle – Bishop of Armidale
- Sir Marcus Loane – Archbishop of Sydney
- Henry Newton – Bishop of New Guinea
- Anthony Howard Nichols – Bishop of North West Australia
- Donald Robinson – Archbishop of Sydney
- John Satterthwaite – Bishop of Gibraltar, Bishop of Fulham
- Ian Shevill – Bishop of Newcastle
- Father Joseph Patrick Slattery – physicist, radiologist, pioneer in the field of radiography
- Peter Watson – Archbishop of Melbourne
- William Wright – Bishop of Maitland-Newcastle

=== Sciences ===
==== Astronauts and astronomy ====
- Ron Bracewell – known for nulling interferometry, and the Bracewell probe concept in SETI; Lewis M. Terman Emeritus Professor of Electrical Engineering at Stanford University
- Philip K. Chapman – Apollo 14 Mission Scientist
- Greg Chamitoff – NASA astronaut and University of Sydney Lawrence Hargrave Professor of Aeronautical Engineering
- Bernard Mills – developed the Mills Cross Telescope and Molonglo Observatory Synthesis Telescope
- Anna Moore – director of The Australian National University Institute for Space
- Ruby Payne-Scott – first to use radio interferometry
- Edwin Ernest Salpeter – Crafoord Laureate Astronomy 1997, known for the initial mass function and accretion disk model of active galactic nuclei
- Paul D. Scully-Power – first Australian-born astronaut to fly in space

==== Biology ====
- Marnie Blewitt – molecular biologist, scientist in the field of epigenetics
- Marguerite Henry – zoologist
- Catherine King – ecotoxicologist, Antarctic researcher
- June Lascelles – microbiologist, pioneer in microbial photosynthesis
- John Mattick – molecular biologist
- Robert May, Baron May of Oxford – winner of the Crafoord Prize in Biosciences (1996)
- Sir Gustav Nossal
- Roland Stocker – scientist in the field of redox biology
- Pamela Anne Wills – research biologist and radiology scientist

==== Chemistry ====
- Arthur Birch
- Sir John Cornforth – winner of the Nobel Prize in Chemistry (1975)
- David Craig
- Philip A. Gale
- Noel Hush – winner of the Welch Award (2007)
- Alice Motion
- Elizabeth New
- Addy Pross
- Sir Robert Robinson – winner of the Nobel Prize in Chemistry (1947)
- Peter Rutledge
- Barbara H. Stuart
- Anthony Weiss
- Jenny Zhang

==== Computer scientists ====
- Michael Georgeff – AAAI Fellow, director of the Australian Artificial Intelligence Institute
- Rick Jelliffe – inventor of the Schematron schema language
- Rod Johnson – best-selling author; expert in Java/Java EE; founder of the Spring Framework
- John Lions – author of Lions' Commentary on UNIX 6th Edition, with Source Code, commonly known as the Lions Book
- Vaughan Pratt – ACM Fellow; pioneer in computer science; emeritus Professor of Computer Science at Stanford University
- Ross Quinlan – AAAI Fellow; highly cited scholar and a pioneer in decision theory
- Ken Thompson – co-creator of unix; winner of the Turing Award (1983)
- Andrew Tridgell – co-inventor of the rsync algorithm; author of and contributor to the Samba file server

==== Engineering ====
- Ronald Ernest Aitchison – solid-state physicist and electronics engineer
- Ronald N. Bracewell – known for nulling interferometry, and the Bracewell probe concept in SETI; Lewis M. Terman Emeritus Professor of Electrical Engineering at Stanford University
- John Bradfield – designer of the Sydney Harbour Bridge
- Julie Cairney – materials scientist and engineer and Director of the Australian Centre for Microscopy and Microanalysis
- Graeme Clark – inventor of the bionic ear implant
- Bryan Gaensler – dean of Dunlap Institute for Astronomy and Astrophysics and Professor of Astronomy at the University of Toronto
- Robert May, Baron May of Oxford – former chairman of the University Research Board and Professor of Zoology at Princeton University
- John O'Sullivan – winner of Prime Minister's Prize for Science (2009); an originator of wireless technology, credited with the invention of WiFi,
- Ruby Payne-Scott – first female radio astronomer
- David Skellern – made pioneering contributions to WIFI technology
- Richard H. Small – co-inventor of Thiele/Small parameters
- Neville Thiele – co-inventor of Thiele/Small parameters
- David Warren – inventor of the "black box" (flight data recorder)

==== Geology, archeology and oceanography ====
- Nerilie Abram – climate scientist
- Elaine Baker – marine science and environment researcher; Director of the University of Sydney Marine Studies Institute
- Stephen Bourke – archaeologist of the ancient Near East
- V. Gordon Childe – archaeologist of Prehistoric Europe
- Peter Cockcroft – petroleum geologist
- Sir Edgeworth David – geologist and Antarctic explorer
- Ove Hoegh-Guldberg – marine biologist and climate scientist
- Basil Hennessy – archaeologist of the Ancient Near East
- Sir Douglas Mawson – geologist and Antarctic explorer
- Beryl Nashar – geologist; first female PhD in geology at an Australian university; first female Dean of an Australian university
- David O'Connor – egyptologist
- Timothy Potts – art historian, archaeologist, and Director of the J. Paul Getty Museum
- Karin Sowada – archaeologist of Egypt
- Griffith Taylor – Antarctic explorer; Professor of Geography at the University of Chicago; founder of the Geography department at the University of Toronto

==== Mathematics and economics ====
- Robert Griffiths – Professor of Mathematical Genetics at the University of Oxford
- Peter Gavin Hall – Professor of Statistics at the University of California, Davis
- John Harsanyi – winner of the Nobel Prize in Economics (1994)
- Richard Holden – Professor of Economics of the UNSW Business School at the University of New South Wales
- Jan Kmenta – Emeritus Professor of Economics at the University of Michigan
- Kelvin Lancaster – creator of the theory of the second best and "A New Approach to Consumer Theory"; John Bates Clark Professor of Economics at Columbia University
- Graeme Milton – Professor of Mathematics at the University of Utah, winner of the SIAM Ralph E. Kleinman Prize; SIAM fellow
- Pat Moran – statistician known for his work on probability theory and its application to population and evolutionary genetics
- Yew-Kwang Ng – economist at Monash University
- Graeme Segal – Lowndean Professor of Astronomy and Geometry; Fellow of St John’s College, Cambridge
- Eugene Seneta – co-inventor of the Variance-gamma distribution
- Trevor Swan – economist best known for his work on the Solow-Swan Model
- Justin Wolfers – economist of Wharton School of Business at the University of Pennsylvania
- Eddie Woo – secondary school teacher and writer best known for his work on mathematics lessons published on YouTube

==== Medicine ====
- George Henry Abbott – surgeon and former Fellow at the University of Sydney
- Katie Louisa Ardill – first woman to be appointed as a divisional surgeon in New South Wales; among the first female doctors when she joined the British Expeditionary Forces in Egypt in 1915
- Nikos Athanasou – Professor of Musculoskeletal Pathology at the Oxford University and Greek-Australian novelist
- Samy Azer – Professor of Medical Education; international medical educator
- Maxwell Bennett – proved that nerve terminals on muscles release transmitter molecules, rather than just the noradrenaline and acetylcholine that were previously known
- Dame Valerie Beral – epidemiologist; Fellow of the Royal Society; Head of Cancer Epidemiology Unit at the University of Oxford and Cancer Research UK
- Dagmar Berne – first woman to study medicine in Australia. Completed her studies in France after the Vice Chancellor and Dean of Medicine prevented her from graduating.
- Ralph Beattie Blacket – beriberi and heart disease researcher
- Grace Boelke – general practitioner; one of the first two female graduates in medicine from the University of Sydney
- Claudia Bradley – pharmacist, paediatrician, orthopaedist
- Jennifer Byrne – cancer researcher
- Janet Carr – physiotherapist
- John Carter – endocrinologist and former President of Australian Diabetes Society
- Victor Chang – pioneer of modern heart transplantation
- Robert Clancy – developer of first oral vaccine for acute bronchitis
- Graeme Clark – inventor of cochlear ear implant
- Iza Coghlan – physician; one of the first two female graduates in medicine from the University of Sydney
- David A. Cooper – HIV/AIDS researcher and Director of the Kirby Institute
- Grace Cuthbert-Browne – doctor and Director of Maternal and Baby Welfare in the New South Wales Department of Public Health, 1937–1964
- Justine Damond – veterinarian, spiritual healer, and meditation coach before being killed by a Minneapolis Police Department officer
- Raymond Dart – anatomist and anthropologist, known for his discovery in 1924 of a fossil (first ever found) of Australopithecus africanus (extinct hominid closely related to humans)
- John Diamond – developer of Behavioral Kinesiology (now called Life-Energy Analysis), a system based upon applied kinesiology, incorporating the emotions
- Anna Donald – pioneer and advocate of evidence-based medicine
- Rachael Dunlop – medical researcher and sceptic
- John Dwyer – Australian doctor, professor of medicine, and public health advocate.
- Creswell Eastman – Endocrinologist, professor of medicine, known for Iodine Deficiency Disorders research.
- Sir John Eccles – winner of Nobel Prize in Physiology or Medicine (1963)
- Peter Green – director of the Celiac Disease Center at Columbia University
- Sir Norman Gregg – identified rubella in early pregnancy as a human teratogen
- Sir Henry Harris – Regius Professor of Medicine at Oxford; first demonstrated the existence of tumour-suppressing genes
- Freida Ruth Heighway – obstetrician and gynaecologist
- Ken Hillman – intensive care physician
- Portia Holman – child psychiatrist
- David Hunter – Dean of Academic Affairs of Harvard T.H. Chan School of Public Health at Harvard University
- John Hunter – Challis Professor of Anatomy at age 24 years whose brilliant career, achieving international recognition, was cut short by fever just two years later
- Sir Keith Jones – surgeon and former president of the Australian Medical Association
- Sir Bernard Katz – 1970 Nobel Laureate in Medicine or Physiology "for discoveries concerning the humoral transmittors in the nerve terminals and the mechanism for their storage, release and inactivation"
- Robert Kavanaugh – dentist and George Cross recipient
- Ross Kerridge – anesthesiologist; Lord Mayor of Newcastle
- Stephen W. Kuffler – "father of modern neuroscience"
- Max Lake – Australia's first specialist hand surgeon
- Gerald Lawrie – American heart surgeon and pioneer in the surgical treatment of valvular heart disease; performed the first mitral valve repair using the daVinci robotic surgical system; Methodist Hospital Michael E. Debakey Professor of Cardiac Surgery at Baylor College of Medicine
- Sir Herbert Maitland – surgeon
- William McBride – obstetrician, who in 1961 first warned the medical world against thalidomide as a human teratogen
- Charles George McDonald – physician, army officer and academic
- Patrick McGorry – Australian of the Year 2010
- Wirginia Maixner – neurosurgeon, Director of neurosurgery at the Royal Children's Hospital in Melbourne; graduated in 1986
- Sir Michael Marmot – President of British Medical Association, Professor of Epidemiology and Public Health at University College London; has conducted ground-breaking studies into stroke
- John Mattick – Executive Director of the Garvan Institute of Medical Research in Sydney, whose research led to the discovery of the function of non-coding DNA
- Stan Devenish Meares – former president of Australian Council Royal College of Obstetricians and Gynaecologists
- Donald Metcalf – his research revealed the control of blood cell formation
- Errol Solomon Meyers – prominent Brisbane doctor; one of the founding fathers of the School of Medicine at the University of Queensland
- Jacques Miller – discoverer of the function of the thymus (the last major organ of the human body whose function remained unknown)
- Sir William Morrow – former president of Royal Australasian College of Physicians
- Philip Nitschke – physician, humanist, founder and director of Exit International
- Sir Gustav Nossal – immunologist, discoverer of the "one cell-one antibody" rule, which states that each B lymphocyte, developed in bone marrow, secretes a specific antibody in response to an encounter with a specific foreign antigen
- Mitchell Notaras – graduate who funded the $1.1 million Mitchel J Notaras Scholarship for Colorectal Medicine at the University of Sydney
- Susie O'Reilly – family doctor and obstetrician, noted for her rejected application for residency at Sydney Hospital in favour of male applicants in 1905 despite her excellent academic record
- Brian Owler – president of the Australian Medical Association
- Cecil Purser – former chairman Royal Prince Alfred Hospital
- Margery Scott-Young – surgeon
- Thomas Peter Anderson Stuart – founder of the University of Sydney medical school
- Colin Sullivan – inventor of the Continuous Positive Airflow Pressure (CPAP) mask
- Mavis Sweeney – hospital pharmacist
- Frank Tidswell – former director New South Wales Government Bureau of Microbiology and Director of Pathology at the Royal Alexandra Hospital for Children
- Alan O. Trounson – President of the California Institute for Regenerative Medicine
- John Turtle – Kellion Professor of Endocrinology at the University of Sydney
- Nan Waddy – psychiatrist
- Robert Walsh – medical researcher and geneticist
- Claire Weekes – health writer and pioneer of anxiety treatment; first woman to graduate from the University of Sydney with a doctorate of science
- Harry Windsor – heart surgeon
- Donald Wood-Smith – Professor of Clinical Surgery at Columbia University
- Jeannette Young – medical doctor and Chief Health Officer of Queensland

==== Physics ====
- Bruce Bolt – pioneer of engineering seismology; Professor of Earth and Planetary Science at the University of California, Berkeley
- Brian O'Brien – physicist and space scientist
- Richard Dowden – noted geo- and astrophysicist
- Herbert Huppert – Professor of Theoretical Geophysics and Foundation Director of Institute of Theoretical Geophysics at the University of Cambridge; Fellow of King's College, Cambridge
- Richard Makinson – physicist known for his contributions to amorphous semiconductors
- Bernard Mills – inventor of the Mills Cross Telescope
- Edwin Ernest Salpeter – astrophysicist known for his contributions to Bethe–Salpeter equation and initial mass function; emeritus Professor of Physics at Cornell University

==== Veterinary and agricultural scientists ====
- Patricia Kathleen Abbott – first woman to graduate in veterinary science
- Vanessa Barrs – feline researcher
- William Ian Beardmore Beveridge – Professor of Animal Pathology and Director of the Institute of Animal Pathology at the University of Cambridge
- Chris Brown – veterinarian and TV presenter
- Sir Ian Clunies Ross – Chairman of Commonwealth Scientific and Industrial Research Organisation
- Hugh McLeod Gordon – veterinary parasitologist
- Daria Nina Love – veterinary microbiologist
- Gordon McClymont – agricultural scientist, ecologist, and educationist; foundation chair of the Department of Rural Science at the University of New England; originator of the term "sustainable agriculture"
- Ross Perry – Australia’s first registered avian veterinarian; first to study and name Psittacine Beak and Feather Disease, for which he was co-discoverer of viral infection agent
- Sanjaya Rajaram – winner of the World Food Prize (2014); former head of Wheat Programme at International Maize and Wheat Improvement Centre
- Elizabeth Tasker – fire ecologist

=== Sport ===
- 'Snowy' Baker – rugby union, diving, boxing, swimming and polo player
- Nigel Barker – sprinter
- Ken Catchpole (Note: Graduated with a Masters of Science; played exclusively for the Randwick Club.) – rugby union footballer, state and national representative half-back
- Alex Chambers – mixed martial artist
- Chloe Dalton – Australian rules football, rugby union player and basketballer; gold medalist at the 2016 Summer Olympics
- Caitlin De Wit – wheelchair basketball player
- Kilian Elkinson – Bermudian footballer
- Nick Farr-Jones – rugby union footballer
- Jessica Fox – slalom canoer, gold medalist at the 2020 Summer Olympics and 2024 Summer Olympics
- Peter Fuzes – association soccer player
- Scott Gourley – rugby union and rugby league
- Sienna Green – water polo player
- Phil Hardcastle – rugby union footballer
- Peter Johnson – rugby player (Note: Played for Sydney University Club and was a member of Randwick Club at time of Australian captaincy.)
- Tom Lawton, Snr – rugby union player
- Jack Metcalfe – long jumper, triple jumper and javelin thrower
- Herbert Moran – rugby union player
- Stirling Mortlock (Note: Graduated with a Bachelor of Science; played exclusively for the Gordon Club.) – rugby union player
- Dean Mumm (Note: Captained Australia in non-test matches in 2009.) – rugby union player
- Otto Nothling – rugby union and cricket player
- Ellyse Perry – cricket and football player
- Mike Pyke – rugby union player and Australian rules footballer
- Alex Ross – state and national representative rugby union player
- Kevin Ryan – rugby union and rugby league player (Note: Graduated in Law; did not play for any Sydney University Club.)
- John Solomon – rugby union player, state and national representative versatile back
- Johnny Taylor – rugby union and cricket player
- John Thornett (Note: Graduate in Science and Engineering; played for Sydney University Club and was a member of Northern Suburbs Club at time of Australian captaincy.) – rugby union player
- Dick Tooth – rugby union footballer
- John Treloar – sprinter,
- Johnnie Wallace – rugby union player, state and national representative three-quarter
- Phil Waugh – rugby union footballer
- Zhao Zong-Yuan – youngest Australian to become a chess Grandmaster

=== Other ===
- David Gulasi – Australian social media figure active in China
- Paul Hockings – anthropologist
- Margaret McArthur – anthropologist and nutritionist
- Mervyn Meggitt – anthropologist
- Anne Pattel-Gray – theologian
- Jane Sinclair Reid – educator of blind students

== Faculty ==
- John Anderson – Challis Professor of Philosophy
- Nadia Badawi – Chair of Cerebral Palsy
- Charles Badham – Professor of Classics and Logic
- Noel Benson – demonstrator in the Department of Geology
- Alison Betts – professor of Silk Road studies
- Quentin Bryce – principal of The Women's College, University of Sydney, 1997–2003; later governor-General of Australia
- John Burnheim – professor of general philosophy
- Gregory Chamitoff – Lawrence Hargrave Professor of Aeronautical Engineering
- James Crawford – Challis Professor of International Law and dean of the Faculty of Law; later justice of the International Court of Justice
- Keith Dobney – Head of the School of Philosophical and Historical Inquiries
- William A. Foley – Professor of Linguistics; co-developer of Role and Reference Grammar
- Moira Gatens – Challis Professor of philosophy
- Robert Gilbert – Professor of Chemistry and Founding Director of the Key Centre for Polymer Colloids
- Julia Kindt – Professor in Classics and Ancient History Department, ARC Future Fellow
- Kirsten McCaffery – Research Fellow and Director of Research at the Sydney School of Public Health
- Margaret C. Miller – Arthur and Renee George Professor of Classical Archaeology
- Helen Plummer Phillips – first tutor to women students
- Enoch Powell – Professor of Greek; later British politician
- Leo Radom – Professor of Computational Chemistry
- John Smith – Professor of Chemistry and Experimental Physics
- James Stewart – Professor of Near Eastern Archaeology
- Julius Stone – Challis Professor of Jurisprudence and International Law
- Dacheng Tao – Professor of Computer Science in the School of Computer Science
- Yanis Varoufakis – senior lecturer in economics; later Finance Minister of Greece during the Greek Debt Crisis of 2015
- Roger Vaughan – rector of St John's College, University of Sydney – 1874–1877; later archbishop of Sydney
- George Winterton – Professor of Constitutional Law
- Dinesh Wadiwel – senior lecturer in Human Rights and Socio-Legal Studies
- Fiona A. White – professor of social psychology

== Administration ==
=== Chancellors ===
The chancellor is elected by the fellows and presides at Senate meetings. In 1924, the executive position of vice-chancellor was created, and the chancellor ceased to have managerial responsibilities. Until 1860, the chancellor was known as the provost.

Ordinal	Name	Term begin	Term end	Time in office	Notes
1	Edward Hamilton	1851	1854	3 years	
2	Sir Charles Nicholson	1854	1862	8 years	
3	Francis Merewether	1862	1865	3 years	
4	Sir Edward Deas Thomson	1865	1878	13 years	
5	Sir William Montagu Manning	1878	1895	7 years	
6	Sir William Charles Windeyer	1895	1896	1 year	
7	Sir Normand MacLaurin	1896	1914	18 years	
8	Sir William Portus Cullen	1914	1934	20 years	
9	Sir Mungo William MacCallum	1934	1936	2 years	
10	Sir Percival Halse Rogers	1936	1941	5 years	
11	Sir Charles Blackburn	1941	1964	23 years	
12	Sir Charles George McDonald	1964	1970	6 years	
13	Sir Hermann Black	1970	1990	20 years	
14	Sir James Rowland	1990	1991	1 year	
15	Dame Leonie Kramer	1991	2001	10 years	
16	Kim Santow	2001	2007	6 years	
17	Dame Marie Bashir	2007	2012	5 years	
18	Belinda Hutchinson	2013	2024	13 years	
19	David Thodey	2024	present	2 years	

=== Vice-Chancellors ===
The vice-chancellor serves as the chief executive officer of the university, and oversees most of the university's day-to-day operations, with the chancellor serving in a largely ceremonial role. Before 1924, the vice-chancellors were fellows of the university, elected annually by the fellows. Until 1860, the vice-chancellor was known as the vice-provost. Since 1955, the full title has been Vice-Chancellor and Principal.

Ordinal	Name	Term begin	Term end	Time in office	Notes
1	Sir Charles Nicholson	1851	1853	2 years	
2	Francis Merewether	1854	1862	8 years	
3	Sir Edward Deas Thomson	1863	1865	2 years	
4	John Plunkett	1865	1869	4 years	
5	Robert Allwood	1869	1883	14 years	
6	Sir William Charles Windeyer	1883	1886	3 years	
7	Sir Normand MacLaurin	1887	1889	2 years	
8	Sir Arthur Renwick	1889	1891	2 years	
9	Henry Chamberlain Russell	1891	1892	1 year	
10	Alfred Paxton Backhouse	1892	1894	2 years	
—	Sir Normand MacLaurin	1895	1896	1 year	
—	Alfred Paxton Backhouse	1896	1899	3 years	
—	Sir Arthur Renwick	1900	1902	2 years	
11	Archibald Henry Simpson	1902	1904	2 years	
12	Sir Philip Sydney Jones	1904	1906	2 years	
—	Sir Arthur Renwick	1906	1908	2 years	
13	Sir William Portus Cullen	1909	1911	2 years	
—	Alfred Paxton Backhouse	1911	1914	3 years	
14	Frank Leverrier	1914	1917	3 years	
15	Cecil Purser	1917	1919	2 years	
16	Sir David Gilbert Ferguon	1919	1921	2 years	
—	Frank Leverrier	1921	1923	2 years	
—	Cecil Purser	1923	1924	1 year	
17	Sir Mungo William MacCallum	1924	1928	4 years	
18	Sir Robert Strachan Wallace	1928	1947	19 years	
19	Sir Stephen Henry Roberts	1947	1967	20 years	
20	Sir Bruce Rodda Williams	1967	1981	14 years	
21	John Manning Ward	1981	1990	9 years	
22	Donald McNicol	1990	1996	6 years	
23	Derek John Anderson	1996	1996	less than 1 year	
24	Gavin Brown	1996	2008	12 years	
25	Michael Spence	2008	2020	12 years	
26	Stephen Garton	2020	2021	less than 1 year	
27	Mark Scott	2021	present	2 years	
