= List of Australian Club members =

Exclusive club for men in Australia

The following is a list of notable past and present members of the Australian Club.

== A ==
- Hon Joseph Palmer Abbott OBE MC, Grazier and politician
- Haynes Gibbes Alleyne, Medical practitioner.
- Hon John Anderson (Australian politician) AO, Grazier and politician (deputy prime minister)
- Rt Hon Doug Anthony AC, CH, FTSE Grazier and politician (deputy prime minister)
- Hon Larry Anthony AO

== B ==
- Sir Samuel Henry Egerton Barraclough KBE VD, Engineer
- Rt Hon Sir Edmund Barton GCMG QC, First Prime Minister of Australia and a founding justice of the High Court of Australia.
- Rt Hon Sir Garfield Barwick GCMG AK, Attorney-General of Australia (1958–61), Minister for External Affairs (1961–64) and the seventh and longest serving Chief Justice of Australia (1964–81). He was appointed a Privy Counsellor in 1964 and a judge of the International Court of Justice (1973–74)[1]
- Hon Sir Thomas Bavin KCMG, 24th Premier of New South Wales.
- General Sir Phillip Bennett AC, KBE, DSO, KStJ
- Lieutenant General Sir Frank Horton Berryman, KCVO, CB, CBE, DSO.
- Lester Joseph Brain (1903–1980) aviator and aviation administrator
- Hon Sir Gerard Brennan KBE AC QC
- John Le Gay Brereton
- Major-General Sir William Throsby Bridges KCB CMG, First Australian appointed to General rank, KIA Gallipoli
- Sir Thomas Buckland, Goldmine-manager, pastoralist, businessman and philanthropist.
- Hon Sir James Burns KCMG, Businessman, shipowner and philanthropist
- Hon Sir William Westbrooke Burton KCMG, Politician and judge.

== C ==
- Robert Campbell, Landowner
- Robert Campbell, Politician
- Hon Sir John Carrick AC KCMG
- Cardinal Edward Idris Cassidy AC
- John Henry Challis, Benefactor University of Sydney
- General Sir Harry Chauvel GCMG, KCB
- David S. Clarke AO, Chairman Macquarie Group.
- Hon Terence Cole AO QC
- General The Hon Sir Peter Cosgrove AK MC CNZM
- Sir Bob Cotton KCMG AO
- Sir Charles Cowper, KCMG, Premier of NSW
- Sir Norman Lethbridge Cowper
- James Charles Cox (1834–1912) medical practitioner
- Major-General Paul Alfred Cullen AC CBE DSO ED, Soldier and Grazier.
- Sir Arthur Roden Cutler VC, AK, KCMG, KCVO, CBE

== D ==
- William John Dakin, Zoologist
- Lieutenant General Sir Thomas Joseph Daly KBE, CB, DSO
- Rt Hon Sir William Bede Dalley QC, Attorney-General of New South Wales
- Frederick Matthew Darley GCMG, Chief Justice & lieutenant-governor of New South Wales.
- Sir James Ralph Darling OBE, Headmaster Geelong Grammar School.
- Hon Sir John Bayley Darvall KCMG QC, Attorney-general of NSW
- Hon Sir William Deane AC, KBE, KStJ, QC, Australian judge and 22nd Governor-General of Australia.
- Peter Debnam MP
- Hon Sir George Dibbs KCMG, Three times Premier of NSW
- Rt Hon Sir Owen Dixon OM GCMG KBE, Australian judge and diplomat, was the sixth Chief Justice of Australia.
- Sir Stuart Donaldson KCMG
- Sir Talbot Duckmanton CBE. Australian broadcaster and General Manager of the Australian Broadcasting Commission, former chairman of Newington College Council 1968-1973
- Sir Walter Gordon Duncan (1885–1963) pastoralist and politician in SA
- Lieutenant General Sir Donald Dunstan AC, KBE, CB (born 18 February 1923) is a former Australian Army officer, who was Governor of South Australia from 1982 to 1991.

== E ==
- Malcolm Henry Ellis, Journalist and historian,

== F ==
- James Fairfax AO
- Sir Warwick Oswald Fairfax
- Charles Brunsdon Fletcher, Editor Sydney Morning Herald (1918–1937)
- Sir James Foots AO, Mining engineer and company director.
- Sir Francis Forbes
- Hon Sir George Warburton Fuller KCMG, Barrister and politician.
- Sir Hudson Fysh KBE, DFC, Aviator and businessman.

== G ==
- Rt Hon Sir Harry Gibbs AK GCMG KBE, Chief Justice of Australia
- David Gonski AC, businessman and arts patron.
- William Deuchar Gordon, grazier and president of the club.
- Sir Albert John Gould VD, lawyer and politician.
- Hon Justice Peter Graham, Federal court judge.
- Sir Norman McAlister Gregg MC, ophthalmologist who discovered Congenital Rubella Syndrome.
- Hon Justice William Gummow AC, Justice High Court of Australia.

== H ==
- Jack Hannes Businessman, founder of HANIMEX
- Hon Sir John Hay KCMG
- Sir Samuel Hordern KBE
- Air Chief Marshal Angus Houston AC AFC
- Hon John Howard AC, Prime Minister of Australia (1996–2007)
- Admiral Michael Wyndham Hudson AC
- Hon Tom Hughes AO QC
- Hon Justice Sir Percival Halse Rogers KBE, Judge
- Dr Timothy Hawkes OAM, former Headmaster of The King's School, Parramatta

== J ==
- Sir George Alfred Julius (1873–1946), mechanical engineer and inventor
- Alan Jackson AO (1936–2018), businessman and corporate executive

== K ==
- Hon Norman William Kater
- Sir Norman William Kater, Medical practitioner, grazier and politician.
- Stephen Lackey Kessell (1897–1979) forester and administrator
- Stephen Kimpton, Australian first-class cricketer and company director.
- Philip Gidley King (1817–1904) pastoralist and politician.
- Phillip Parker King, Naval officer, hydrographer and company manager.
- David Kirk MBE, Rugby World Cup winning captain of New Zealand and former CEO of John Fairfax & Sons
- Rt Hon Sir Frank Kitto AC, KBE, KC
- Frederick Percival Kneeshaw (1883–1955) engineer and company director
- Rt Hon Sir Adrian Knox KCMG QC, Second Chief Justice of the High Court of Australia.

== L ==
- Lieutenant General Peter Leahy AC is a former Chief of the Australian Army.
- George Le Couteur OBE, company director.
- Sir Charles Lloyd Jones, Chairman David Jones
- Hon Jim Longley
- Robert Lowe, 1st Viscount Sherbrooke, British and Australian statesman; served in William Ewart Gladstone's cabinet as Chancellor of the exchequer 1868–1873.

== M ==
- Hon Hannibal Hawkins Macarthur Australian colonist, politician, businessman and wool pioneer.
- Hon Sir William Macarthur, Pastoralist
- Major-General Sir Denzil Macarthur-Onslow CBE DSO ED
- Major General Hon James Macarthur-Onslow VD Soldier, grazier and politician.
- Professor Sir Mungo William MacCallum KCMG, Educationist, scholar and administrator.
- Hugh Mackay
- Sir Charles Mackellar, surgeon and M.P.
- Hon Michael MacKellar
- Brigadier-General Henry Normand MacLaurin
- Sir Normand MacLaurin, Physician, company director and university administrator.
- Hon Sir Alexander Macleay MLC FLS FRS, Colonial secretary NSW.
- Sir George Macleay KCMG, Explorer and Politician.
- William Sharp Macleay FRS, Entomologist.
- Sir Herbert Lethington Maitland, Surgeon and sportsman.
- Sir William Montagu Manning KCMG
- Conrad Martens
- Rear-Admiral Sir David Martin KCMG AO, Governor of NSW
- Hon Sir James Martin KCB QC, Three times Premier of New South Wales, and Chief Justice of the Supreme Court of New South Wales.
- Sir David Maughan QC, Barrister.
- John McCallum AC, CBE, Actor.
- Samuel McCaughey (1892–1955) grazier
- Rt Hon Sir William McMahon CH GCMG
- Sir William McMillan KCMG, Merchant and politician,
- Hon Roddy Meagher AO QC
- Francis Lewis Shaw Merewether, Public servant and university chancellor.
- Sir Denison Samuel King Miller KCMG, Banker governor of the Commonwealth Bank.
- Jim Millner, former president of the NRMA and chairman of Soul Patts
- David Scott Mitchell, founder of the Mitchell Library, Sydney
- Thomas Mitchell, surveyor and explorer of south-eastern Australia.
- Max Moore-Wilton AC
- Hugh Morgan AC
- Sir William Morrow, DSO ED.
- Lieutenant General Sir Leslie James Morshead KCB, KBE, CMG, DSO, ED
- Thomas Sutcliffe Mort
- Allan Moss AO, former managing director and CEO of Macquarie Group
- Sir Rupert Myers KBE, vice chancellor, University of New South Wales

== N ==
- Sir Charles Nicholson Bt, Founder of University of Sydney and Australia's first Baronet
- Lieutenant General Sir John Northcott KCMG KCVO CB

== O ==
- Richard Edward O'Connor, Foundation Justice of the High Court of Australia
- Arthur Alexander Walton Onslow, Naval officer and politician.
- Sir Alexander Campbell Onslow, Judge.
- Rt Hon Sir William Francis Langer Owen KBE, Judge of the Supreme Court of New South Wales and of the High Court of Australia.
- Sir William Owen, Royal commissioner and Chief Judge in Equity of the Supreme Court of New South Wales.

== P ==
- Hon Clyde Packer
- Sir Frank Packer KBE, OStJ
- James Packer AM
- Kerry Packer AC
- Rt Hon Sir Earle Page GCMG CH
- Banjo Paterson CBE
- Hon Andrew Peacock AC
- Professor Sir John Beverley Peden KCMG, barrister and professor of law
- Cardinal George Pell AC
- Brigadier Hon Thomas Alfred John Playfair DSO OBE VD MLC, Meat exporter, soldier and politician.

== R ==
- Rt Hon Sir George Edward Rich KCMG, Justice of High Court of Australia
- Hon Justice Bernard Blomfield Riley, Federal Court Judge
- Sir Alfred Roberts KCMG, surgeon
- Sir Stephen Henry Roberts CMG, Historian and university vice-chancellor
- Joseph Phelps Robinson (1815–1848) banker and landowner
- Hon William Robson MLC, NSW parliamentarian
- Christopher Rolleston CMG
- Air Marshal Sir James Rowland AC, KBE, DFC, AFC, Governor of New South Wales
- George Alfred Russell (1839–1926), insurance executive

== S ==
- Gordon Samuels, AC, CVO, QC, KStJ,
- Hon Justice Kim Santow AC
- Paul D. Scully-Power AM
- Hon Sir John See KCMG, Premier of New South Wales.
- Sir Nicholas Shehadie, AC, OBE, former Lord Mayor of Sydney (1973–1975) and ex-Captain in the Australia national rugby union team.
- Sir Colin Sinclair KBE
- Rt Hon Ian Sinclair AC.
- Robert Burdett Smith (1837–1895) solicitor and politician
- Hon Warwick Smith AM
- Rt Hon Sir Alfred Stephen GCMG CB
- Hon Justice Sir Matthew Henry Stephen, Puisne judge of the supreme court of New South Wales.
- Sir Bertram Stevens KCMG, Premier of New South Wales from 16 May 1932 to 5 August 1939.
- Hon Sir Francis Bathurst Suttor,
- Sir Thomas Peter Anderson Stuart KCMG, Professor of physiology and medical administrator.

== T ==
- The Hon. Angus Talbot, former chairman of Newington College Council 2007-2013
- Sir Edward Deas Thomson KCMG CB
- Robert Towns, businessman and founder of Townsville.
- Dr Ralph Townsend, headmaster, Winchester College, formerly Oundle and Sydney Grammar School.
- Malcolm Turnbull, MP, former prime minister of Australia

== V ==
- Walter Liberty Vernon VD, Architect and soldier.

== W ==
- Hon Thomas Waddell, Premier of New South Wales
- Hon Sir Charles Gregory Wade KCMG KC, Premier of New South Wales
- Sir Samuel Robert Walder, (1879–1946), Businessman and politician (Lord Mayor of Sydney)
- William Wilkinson Wardell (1823–1899) architect and civil servant
- Hon William Wentworth, explorer and founder of University of Sydney
- Morris West AM
- A B Weigall CMG
- Hunter White
- Richard Windeyer KC
- Major-General Rt Hon Sir Victor Windeyer KBE CB DSO KC, Australian judge, soldier and educator, was a Justice of the High Court of Australia
- Sir William Charles Windeyer
- John Woolley
- Hon Mr Justice Edward Wise
- James Wolfensohn AO KBE
- Lieutenant General Sir Eric Woodward KCMG, KCVO, CB, CBE, DSO, Governor of New South Wales from 1 August 1957 to 1 August 1965

== Z ==
- Sir David Zeidler AC CBE FAA FTSE, Australian chemist and industrialist.
