= Donald Woods (disambiguation) =

Donald Woods (1933–2001) was a South African journalist and activist.

Donald or Don Woods may also refer to:

- Donald Woods (actor) (1906–1998), Canadian-born American film and television actor
- Donald Devereux Woods (1912–1964), British microbiologist
- Don Woods (programmer) (born 1954), computer programmer and co-author of the game Colossal Cave Adventure
- Don Woods (American football) (born 1951), American football player
- Don Woods (meteorologist) (1928–2012), American weatherman

== See also ==
- Donald Wood (1933–2015), Canadian politician, businessman and farmer
- Donald Wood-Smith, professor and doctor
