= Leonie Kramer =

Australian academic (1924-2016)

Dame Leonie Kramer AC, DBE
- Born: Leonie Judith Gibson; 1 October 1924; Melbourne, Victoria, Australia
- Died: 20 April 2016 (aged 91); Sydney, New South Wales, Australia
- Education: University of Melbourne; University of Oxford
- Spouse(s): Harry Kramer (1952–1988, his death)
- Children: 2
- Parent(s): Alfred Gibson; Gertrude Gibson

Dame Leonie Judith Kramer, AC, DBE (/ˈkrɑːmə/, 1 October 1924 – 20 April 2016) was an Australian academic, educator and professor. She is notable as the first female professor of English in Australia, first woman to chair the Australian Broadcasting Corporation and the first female chancellor of the University of Sydney. She was made a Dame Commander of the Order of the British Empire and a Companion of the Order of Australia.

== Education ==
Kramer was born Leonie Gibson to Alfred and Gertrude Gibson in Melbourne on 1 October 1924. She was educated at Presbyterian Ladies' College, Melbourne, and entered the University of Melbourne in 1942, where she was a resident in the women's section of Trinity College, known as Janet Clarke Hall, and was awarded an A. M. White entrance scholarship. She took her Bachelor of Arts degree in 1945, and later attended Oxford University, where she graduated Doctor of Philosophy in 1953. During her postgraduate years at Oxford she tutored at St Hugh's College.

== Career ==
Kramer was appointed a lecturer in English in 1958, then senior lecturer and finally an associate professor in English at the University of New South Wales (UNSW). Kramer remained at UNSW until 1968, when she was appointed Professor of Australian Literature at the University of Sydney, the first female professor of English in Australia. She was Visiting Professor at Harvard University's Chair of Australian Literature Studies (1981–82). She was an Emeritus Professor of Australian Literature at the University of Sydney. She was elected a Fellow of the Australian Academy of the Humanities in 1974.

A major focus of Kramer's critical writing was the works of Henry Handel Richardson. She also edited the Oxford History of Australian Literature (1981) which did not receive good reviews.

Kramer served on numerous public bodies during her long career. She was the first woman to be appointed to the Chair of the Australian Broadcasting Corporation (1982–83), having served as a member of the ABC Board since 1977. During her time at the ABC, Kramer came to be known as "Servalan" after the autocratic character in the BBC science fiction series Blake's 7.

Her other appointments include the Secondary Schools Board (1976–82), the Council of the National Library (1975–81), NAATI (1977–81) and the Universities Council (1977–86). She served as a senior fellow of the Institute of Public Affairs (1988–96), a commissioner of the NSW Electricity Commission (1988–95) and chairman of the board of directors of the National Institute of Dramatic Art (1987–92). She also served on the boards of large corporations including Western Mining Corporation and ANZ Banking Group.

In 1986 she received the inaugural Britannica Award for the "dissemination of learning for the benefit of mankind". She also received honorary DLitt from the University of Tasmania and honorary LLDs from the University of Melbourne and the Australian National University.

She was appointed an Officer of the Order of the British Empire in 1976. In 1982, she was made a Dame Commander of the order. In 1993 she was appointed a Companion of the Order of Australia, at the time, the highest civilian award in the Australian honours system for "service to Australian literature, to education and to the community".

Kramer was deputy chancellor of the University of Sydney from 1989 to 1991 and chancellor from 1991 to 2001, becoming the first woman to hold the position. In 1995, she chaired the judging panel of the Miles Franklin Award where Helen Darville was conferred the award for her novel The Hand That Signed the Paper. It was later revealed that Darville alias Demidenko had faked her Ukrainian ancestry on which the book was based. The same year she met criticism for her statement that women "go a bit limp when going gets tough." She stated this in August 1995 when asked about higher positions held in her university by women. She justified her comment stating that she herself "can go limp at times" and attributed it to nothing other than their individual choices.

At the request of the parliament and a hostile university senate, the Governor of New South Wales empowered the senate to dismiss the chancellor of Sydney University in 2001. Kramer retired moments before a controversial senate meeting was to take place to dismiss her. The senate had passed a no-confidence motion concerning to contract details of then-Vice Chancellor Gavin Brown.

== Personal life and death ==
Kramer married Harry Kramer, a South African pathologist, in England in 1952. The couple moved to Australia in 1953, as Harry refused to return to South Africa while apartheid prevailed there. They had two daughters, Hillary and Jocelyn. Harry Kramer died in 1988.

In 2011, following worsening health associated with advanced Alzheimer's disease, Kramer's daughters admitted her to Lulworth House for full-time residential care. In 2012, at Lulworth House, she fractured her hip, and her mobility was greatly limited for the rest of her life.

Her memoir, Broomstick: Personal Reflections of Leonie Kramer, was published in 2012 by Australian Scholarly Publishing. She died, aged 91, on 20 April 2016.

== Bibliography ==
=== As author ===
- Henry Handel Richardson and Some of Her Sources (1954)
- A Companion to Australia Felix (1962)
- Myself When Laura: Fact and Fiction in Henry Handel Richardson's School Career (1966)
- Henry Handel Richardson (1967)
- Henry Kendall (1973) (with A.D. Hope)
- Language and Literature: A Synthesis (1976) (with Robert D. Eagleson) ISBN 0-17-004996-5
- A Guide to Language and Literature (1977) (with Robert D. Eagleson) ISBN 0-17-005008-4
- A.D. Hope (1979)
- Broomstick: Personal Reflections of Leonie Kramer (2012) ISBN 978-1-921875-84-7

=== As editor ===
- Collected Poems (of David Campbell) (1957, 1989)
- Australian Poetry 1961 (1962)
- Coast to Coast: Australian Stories 1963–1964 (1965)
- Selected Stories (of Hal Porter) (1971)
- The Oxford History of Australian Literature (1981)
- The Oxford Anthology of Australian Literature (1985) (with Adrian Mitchell) ISBN 0-19-554477-3
- My Country: Australian Poetry and Stories: Two Hundred Years (1985) ISBN 0-7018-1927-8
- James McAuley: Poetry, Essays and Personal Commentary (1988) ISBN 0-7022-1925-8
- The Multicultural Experiment: Immigrants, Refugees and National Identity (2003) ISBN 1-876492-10-4

Academic offices
Preceded by Sir James Rowland	Chancellor of the University of Sydney; 1991–2001	Succeeded by Justice Kim Santow
