= Hermann Black =

Economist and university chancellor

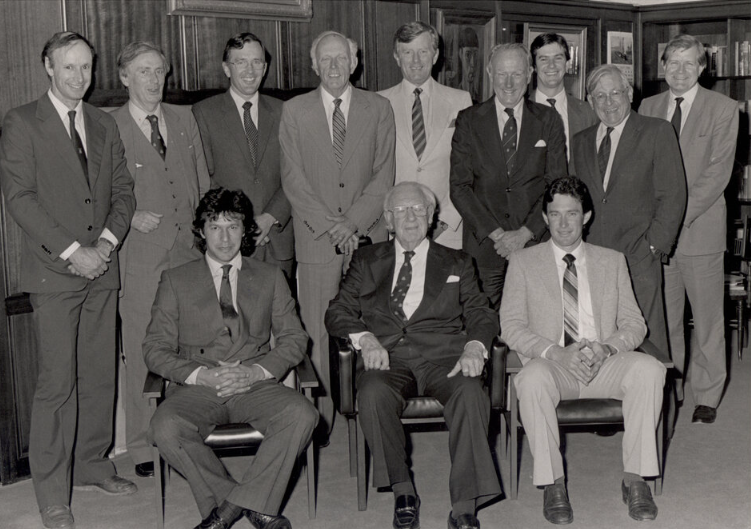
Chancellor Black (seated center) at a 1984 luncheon with Imran Khan (seated left) and Vice-Chancellor John Manning Ward (standing second from left), before Khan played for the university club.

Sir Hermann David Black AC (15 November 1904, Sydney – 28 February 1990, Sydney) was an economist, public-affairs commentator and Chancellor of the University of Sydney. He was knighted in 1974 and appointed a Companion of the Order of Australia in 1986.

Awards included: M. Ec. (Syd), F.C.I.S., F.A.S.A., Hon. D. LITT (N'csle, NSW), Knight Bachelor, A.C. Doctor of the University (U.N.E.), (h.c.), Doctor of the University (Syd), (honoris causa).

Academic offices
| Preceded by Sir Charles McDonald | Chancellor of the University of Sydney; 1970–1990 | Succeeded by Sir James Rowland |
