= Michael Spence (legal scholar) =

Australian academic

The Reverend Michael Spence AC FRSN
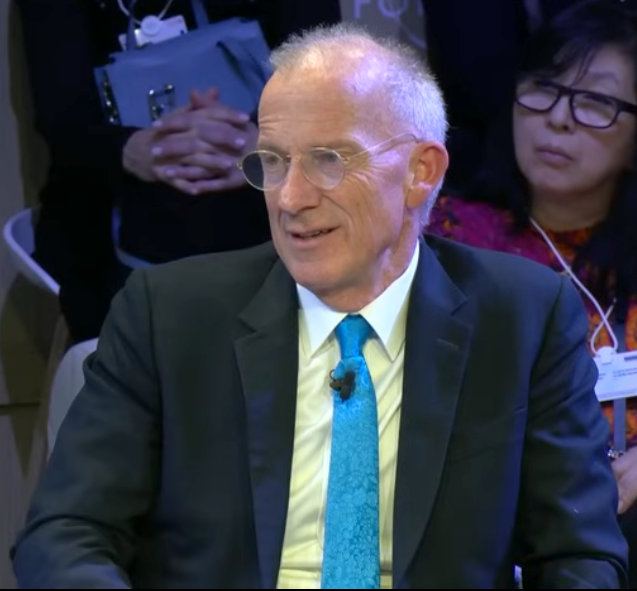
- At the WEF Annual Meeting in 2025

President and Provost of University College London
- Incumbent
- Assumed office January 11, 2021
- Preceded by: Michael Arthur

Vice Chancellor of the University of Sydney
- In office July 11, 2008 – December 14, 2020
- Preceded by: Gavin Brown
- Succeeded by: Stephen Garton

Personal details
- Born: Michael James Spence; 10 January 1962 (age 64)
- Spouses: Beth Ann Peterson (died 2012): Jenny Ihn
- Children: 8
- Education: University of Sydney (BA, LLB); University of Oxford (DPhil, PgDip)

Michael James Spence (born 10 January 1962) is an Australian university administrator who served as the vice-chancellor and principal of the University of Sydney from 2008 to 2020. He is currently the president and provost of University College London.

Spence has a background in intellectual property theory and was also ordained as an Anglican priest in 2006.

== Early life and education ==
Spence's father was a high-school headmaster and his mother was a manager of the Bjelke-Petersen School of Physical Culture. He attended Knox Grammar and the University of Sydney, where he graduated with a Bachelor of Arts degree with first-class honours in English and Italian in 1985 and a Bachelor of Laws degree with honours in 1987.

At the University of Oxford, Spence obtained his DPhil degree in law and became a fellow of St Catherine's College. In the 20 years he spent at the college, he lectured for the university, obtaining a postgraduate diploma in theology from the university.

== Faculty head at Oxford ==
Spence served as head of the law faculty at the University of Oxford and would eventually head the Social Sciences Division, one of the four divisions that constitute that university. One of Spence's priorities at Oxford was to actively encourage fundraising and sponsorship from benefactors and corporate groups. He was a driving force behind the establishment and financial support of a number of Oxford's new research centres and institutes, such as the Oxford Centre for Educational Assessment and the Smith School of Enterprise and the Environment. His responsibilities included oversight of research units, including the James Martin 21st Century School and the Oxford-Man Institute of Quantitative Finance.

== Vice-chancellor and principal of the University of Sydney ==
In 2008, Spence returned to Australia to take up the position of vice-chancellor and principal of the University of Sydney. In 2018, he was reportedly paid $1.53million for the role, the second highest paid university leader in Australia, having been the highest paid previously and having risen 60 percent between 2011 and 2016. In 2018, the Sydney Morning Herald reported concerns by the National Tertiary Education Union that the size of Spence's salary was "positioning him as a CEO of a corporate entity".

=== Vote of no confidence ===
In February 2012, The Conversation website reported that the university had overcommitted financially, with nearly $1 billion in new facilities to be built, $385m of maintenance work required to satisfy work, health and safety standards and international student numbers falling below projected levels. Significant staff cuts were then made, even in the law faculty which faced a 30% increase in students. The cuts led to the Faculty of Arts and Social Sciences "overwhelmingly [endorsing] a motion of no confidence" in Spence. Jake Lynch, one of the initiators of the motion, said Spence had circumvented due process and accountability by setting the consultation date during a time when committees do not meet. Lynch said staff would have rejected the proposal if given the opportunity, as they had done on previous occasions.

=== International students and relationship with China ===
As vice-chancellor, Spence led efforts to increase international student enrolments across Australia. He supported the university's continued engagement with China, and warned the Australian government about being too critical of China's influence on university campuses, in 2018 accusing the Turnbull government of "Sinophobic blatherings", which prompted criticism in return from Turnbull himself. In 2013, when a visit from the Dalai Lama was planned, the university warned organisers not to use its logo, allow media coverage or entry to the event by Tibet activists. When the event was moved off-campus, Spence described it as "in the best interests of researchers across the university", leading Tibetan activists to declare that the university had "compromised their academic freedom and integrity" and sent "a disheartening message to the Tibetan people". In August 2019, Spence warned that debate over the university's and the wider community's relationship with China should not have overtones of the "White Australia policy".

=== Fundraising ===
Spence was an advocate of fundraising at the university and, in May 2013, he launched the "Inspired" fundraising campaign.

In November 2018, Spence and the Premier of New South Wales, Gladys Berejiklian, announced that the University of Sydney was in negotiations with the state government to establish another campus as part of a leading international health, education and research precinct in Western Sydney.

=== Ramsay Centre ===
In 2018, during Spence's tenure as vice-chancellor, the university entered negotiations with the Ramsay Centre for Western Civilisation to establish degrees in Western civilisation in response for $50million in funding. The academics' union at the university called on Spence to end the negotiations, arguing that a relationship would taint the university's reputation for independence. The Ramsay Centre eventually walked away from the negotiations in December 2019 after rejecting a proposal to use the university's existing staff and courses.

== President and provost of University College London ==
In February 2020, Spence announced that he was stepping down from his role of vice-chancellor of the University of Sydney, to become president and provost of University College London, starting in January 2021, to succeed Michael Arthur. Spence was forced to pay back £5500 of claimed travel expenses for his wife, a clear breach of UCL policy. Spence is also the second highest paid university provost in the UK, earning £530,000 per year (including benefits).

== Personal life ==
Spence trained for ordination at St Stephen's House, Oxford, an Anglo-Catholic theological college, graduating with a Postgraduate Diploma in Theology. He was ordained in the Church of England as a deacon in 2006 and as a priest in 2007. From 2006 to 2008, he was a non-stipendiary minister in the parish of Cowley, Oxfordshire, in the Diocese of Oxford. He continues to minister part-time as a priest in an honorary capacity. He is fluent in French and Italian.

Spence met Beth Ann Peterson at the University of Oxford when he was reading for a DPhil. Petersen, originally from Minneapolis, Minnesota, was reading philosophy and theology after studying and rowing at Smith College in Massachusetts. Spence and Petersen were married and had five children. Beth Spence was also ordained as an Anglican priest and served as a curate in the Cowley parish, at the churches of St James and St Francis from 2005 to 2008 and at a parish in Waverley, New South Wales, from 2008 until her death in 2012, aged 47, from bowel cancer.

In 2014, Spence began dating Jenny Ihn, an artist and PhD student at the University of Sydney, whom he later married. The couple have three children together.
