= Henry Normand MacLaurin =

Australian general

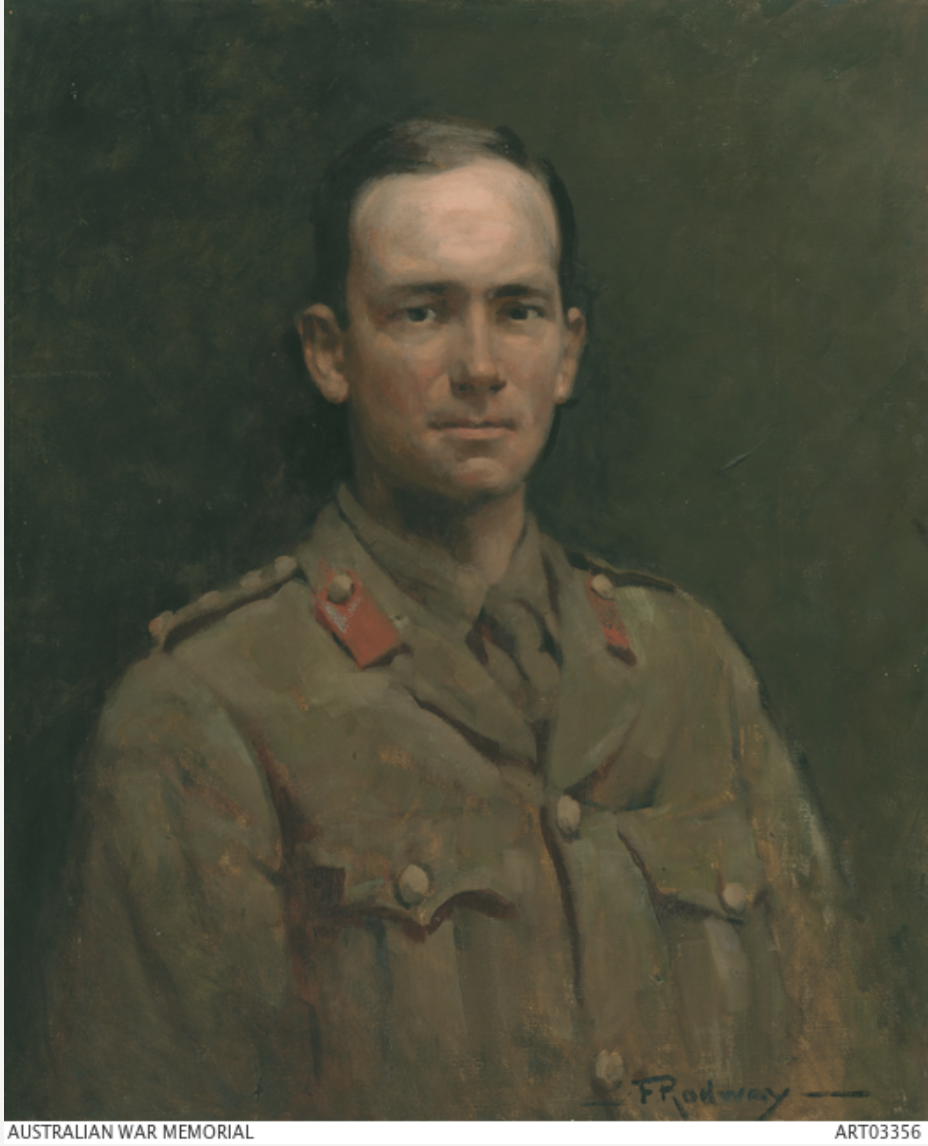
- Portrait of MacLaurin by Florence Rodway
- Born: 31 October 1878; Sydney, Australia
- Died: 27 April 1915 (aged 36); Anzac Cove, Ottoman Empire
- Relatives: Sir Henry Normand MacLaurin (father)
- Military career
- Allegiance: Australia
- Branch: Australian Army
- Service years: 1899–1915
- Rank: Brigadier General
- Commands: 1st Infantry Brigade (1914–15); 26th Infantry Regiment (1913–14)
- Conflicts: First World War; Gallipoli Campaign; Landing at Anzac Cove †
- Awards: Mentioned in Despatches

Brigadier-General Henry Normand MacLaurin (31 October 1878 – 27 April 1915) was an Australian barrister and an Australian Army colonel who served in the First World War. He was shot dead by a Turkish sniper at Gallipoli, and was posthumously promoted to brigadier general when all brigade commanders in the Australian Imperial Force were thus promoted.

== Early life ==
MacLaurin was born on 31 October 1878 in Sydney, Australia. He was the son of Sir Henry Normand MacLaurin, the chancellor of the University of Sydney. He was educated at Blair Lodge School, Polmont, Scotland; Sydney Grammar School; and the University of Sydney, graduating with a Bachelor of Arts. MacLaurin was later admitted to the bar in New South Wales and became a barrister.

== Military career ==
MacLaurin enlisted in the New South Wales Scottish Rifles while still at university and was commissioned as a second lieutenant in 1899. He was promoted to lieutenant in 1900, captain in 1903 and major in 1908. On 1 July 1913, he took command of the 26th Infantry Regiment.

=== First World War ===
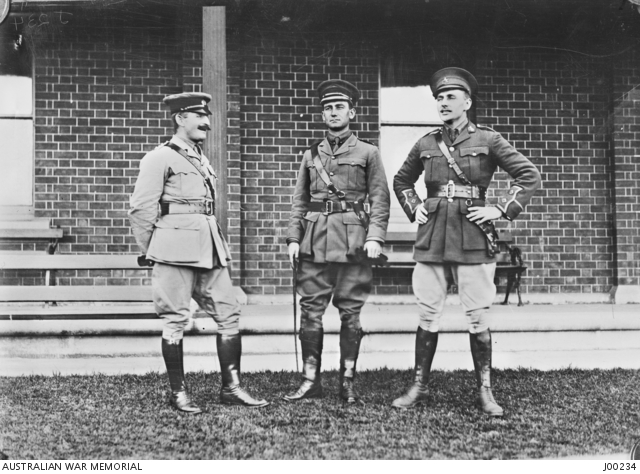
Outdoors portrait of the commander of the 1st Infantry Brigade and some of his staff, presumably taken in 1915. Left to right: Major Francis Duncan Irvine, British Army, Colonel Henry Normand MacLaurin, Captain D. M. King, British Army.

On 15 August 1914, MacLaurin joined the Australian Imperial Force as a full colonel and given command of the 1st Infantry Brigade.

MacLaurin was the youngest of the three original brigade commanders of the 1st Division, and more than ten years younger than any of his four battalion commanders. For a brigade major, he was given a British regular officer, Major Irvine of the Royal Engineers.

MacLaurin's brigade was the last to come ashore at Anzac Cove. By this time a crisis was developing and Major General William Bridges was ordering units to fill gaps almost as soon as they arrived ashore.

During the afternoon of 27 April 1915, when a Turkish counterattack threatened, Major Irvine collected 200 stray men in Monash Valley and was about to send them forward when the news arrived that the need for them had passed. Irvine went up to Steele's Post, where he observed the positions. He was warned about Turkish snipers, but brushed off the warnings and was quoted as saying "It's my business to be shot at". Soon after he was fatally wounded by a sniper.

Less than ten minutes later, MacLaurin was standing on the slopes of the ridge that now bears his name. Unaware of Irvine's fate, MacLaurin was in the act of warning soldiers to keep under cover when he too was shot dead, from the same point, possibly by the same Turkish sniper.

MacLaurin was buried by his men near where he fell in a grave marked with a simple wooden cross. In 1919, his remains were moved to the 4th Battalion Parade Ground Cemetery, on the slopes of Braund's Hill. For his services at Gallipoli he was Mentioned in Despatches. He was also posthumously awarded the 1914–15 Star, British War Medal and Victory Medal. Some weeks after his death, brigade commanders were upgraded from colonels to brigadier generals and MacLaurin was posthumously promoted to brigadier general.

== Family ==
His father was Normand MacLaurin. His eldest brother – listed as his next of kin and one of the executors of his will – was Dr. Charles MacLaurin (1872–1925), a lecturer in medicine at the University of Sydney and the author of Postmortem and other books. His two younger brothers were H.C.H. MacLaurin and J.B. MacLaurin

== See also ==
- List of Australian generals
