= Ryan Junee =

Australian-American entrepreneur (born 1979)

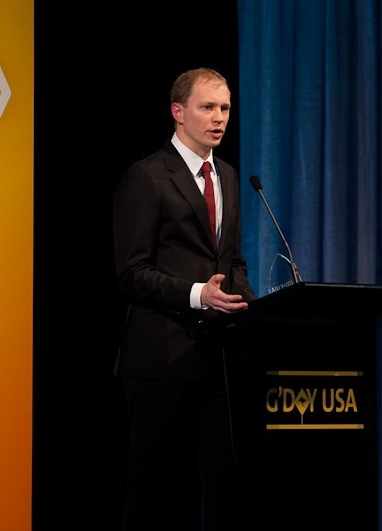
- Junee at G'Day USA
- Born: 17 November 1979
- Occupation: Entrepreneur
- Years active: 2002—present
- Known for: Founder of Parsable, Omnisio and Inporia
- Website: http://ryanjunee.com/bio

Ryan Junee is an Australian-American entrepreneur. He is the founder of Parsable and is based in San Francisco.

== Early career ==
In 2002, Junee graduated from the University of Sydney in Australia with degrees in computer engineering and commerce. After graduating, Junee worked at Telstra, but left when one of his friends raised money for a startup, Sensory Networks. Junee was the first non-founding employee at Sensory Networks, and was with the company as it grew from 5 employees to 70.

In 2003, he was accepted into the Electrical Engineering PhD program at Stanford University and moved to Palo Alto, California. After observing the entrepreneurial energy in Silicon Valley, he left Stanford once he obtained his Master's degree. He resumed working at Sensory Networks as Director of Strategic Partnerships in their Palo Alto office.

== Entrepreneurial career ==
In October 2007, Junee left Sensory Networks to co-found his own company, Omnisio, with Julian Frumar and Simon Ratner. Junee was the co-founder and CEO of Omnisio, a service that made online video more interactive and social, allowing users to add annotations to videos, tag people and highlights, and synchronize videos with PowerPoint presentations. To much acclaim, Omnisio is most famous for the concept of banner advertising units on YouTube videos. The company received early-stage funding from Y Combinator and Chris Sacca.

In July 2008, less than a year after the company was founded, Google acquired Omnisio for an undisclosed amount (TechCrunch reported that the amount was in the range of $15 million). As part of the deal, Junee became Product Manager at YouTube. While at YouTube, Junee integrated several of Omnisio's features into YouTube, including video annotations; in addition, he oversaw the implementation of RealTime, which lets users know what their friends are viewing.

Near the end of 2009, Junee left Google to start Inporia with Max Skibinsky, who sold Hive7 to Playdom in 2010. Inporia, an eCommerce fashion site that combines elements of social and gaming technology, has raised $1.25 million in seed funding from New Enterprise Associates, Ron Conway, Dave McClure, among others.

In 2013 Junee founded Wearable Intelligence with Yan-David Erlich and Chase Feiger, with a goal of bringing wearable technologies like Google Glass to enterprise markets. In 2016 the company was renamed Parsable and raised an additional $20M in funding from investors including Schlumberger, Airbus and Saudi Aramco.
