= Peter Cockcroft =

- Born: Peter John William Cockcroft
- Occupations: Petroleum geologist and researcher
- Years active: 2005-present

Peter Cockcroft FRS, FRGS is an Australian Petroleum geologist, researcher and oil industry executive.

== Early life and education ==
Cockcroft graduated from University of Sydney with a bachelor's degree in geology in 1972. He then went to the United States for further studies and received certification in drilling from the University of Texas. He also holds an MBA from Edinburgh Business School.

== Career ==
Since beginning work in the oil and gas sector, Cockcroft has made oil discoveries in Thailand and Philippines, was involved in oilfield developments in Indonesia. He also undertook the development of the first combined gas field and independent power project in South East Asia.

In 1984, Cockcroft joined Pertamina, a national oil company of Indonesia where he served as an analyst on the initial LNG contracts to Korea in the early 1980s and was in charge of three different domestic gas agreements in Indonesia. He also held technical positions from development geologist to operations manager for a number of oil and gas companies including Kodeco Energy Co., Petromer Trend Corporation, Husky Energy and Asamera Oil.

In 1993, Cockcroft joined as the president of Energy Equity (Asia) where he developed Sengkang combined gas/power field (1 TCF) and power project (135MW) in South Sulawesi, Indonesia. Prior to that, he served as the president of Fletcher Challenge Philippines.

From 1995 to 1999, he served as the Country Manager of BHP Petroleum and has overseen activities of BHP Petroleum in Indonesia, culminating in the development of the Elang Kakatua oilfield and the Bayu-Undan gas field.

In 2002, Cockcroft was appointed as the energy advisor to the president of Timor-Leste and worked with the government on implementing energy policy until 2009. He also served as an advisor to the CEO of Premier Oil and held position of managing director of Premier & Shell Pakistan B.V. from 1999 to 2001.

From 2004 to 2007, Cockcroft served as a visiting research fellow for the Institute of South East Asian Studies and has been a chairman of the Society of Petroleum Engineers in Indonesia, Pakistan, and Singapore, vice chairman of Pakistan Petroleum Association (PPEPCA).

Cockcroft has overseen exploration and production projects in West Africa, Yemen, Australia, Indonesia, France, India and the United States being Board Directors of public companies. He was a founding director of Kuwait Energy plc, a leading private oil company in the Middle East. He served as the chairman of Baraka Petroleum from 2005 to 2007. In 2008, he joined the board of the directors of Blue Energy Limited, and served as the chairman of the company until 2012. He was also the managing director of European Gas Limited from 2010 to 2011 and served on the board of directors of NuEnergy Gas Limited, Kairiki Energy and ERC Equipoise.

Cockcroft has advised the Singapore Stock Exchange (SGX), and was on the board of advisers of Proteus Energy, a company specializing in marginal field developments in California, from 2007 to 2013.

In 2014, Cockcroft was appointed as a lecturer at Edinburgh Business School, where he taught MBA courses on the negotiation of international deals, risk management, as well as oil and gas reserves and valuation.

Cockcroft is currently living in Singapore and working as a mentor and an advisor to entrepreneurs and startup companies.

== Writings ==
In 2017, Cockcroft co-authored a book titled Successful Farmins and Farmouts: For International Oil & Gas Professionals.

He has published over 30 technical papers and presented technical courses around the world in petroleum geology, marginal field development, reserves, and various commercial topics.

== Awards and recognition ==
For his contribution in oil and gas industries, Cockcroft received Life Fellowship of Royal Geographical Society, Life Membership of Society of Petroleum Engineers, Life Membership of South East Asian Petroleum Exploration Society.
