= Barbara H. Stuart =

Australian scientist

Barbara Stuart is an Australian spectroscopist.

== Background ==
Stuart studied her BSc at the University of Sydney in 1987, tutoring at the university for 3 years, then studied a MSc biophysical chemistry, graduating in 1990. Stuart then moved to the UK and studied a PhD in polymer engineering at Imperial College London, graduating in 1993. Stuart then began lecturing in Physical Chemistry at the University of Greenwich for 2 years before returning to Australia to lecture at the University of Technology Sydney.

== Publications ==
- Biological Applications of Infrared Spectroscopy (1997)
- Polymer Analysis (2002)
- Infrared Spectroscopy: Fundamentals and Applications (2004)
- Analytical techniques in materials conservation (2007)
- Forensic Analytical Techniques (2012)
