= Elizabeth Tasker =

Australian fire ecologist

Elizabeth Mary Tasker
- Education: University of Sydney
- Scientific career
- Thesis: The ecological impacts of cattle grazing and associated grazier burning in the eucalypt forests of northern NSW (2002)

Elizabeth Mary Tasker is an Australian fire ecologist. She obtained a PhD in Science at the University of Sydney in 2002. She is a researcher at the NSW Office of Environment and Heritage, and previously worked for the University of Wollongong and for The Australian Museum carrying out biological surveys in Melanesia. Her main area of expertise is the effects of fire and fire management on native animals and plants. She was a Vice-President, and subsequently (to 2015) Director, of the Ecological Society of Australia, the largest professional association of scientists in Australia, and a published wildlife photographer.

== Career ==
Tasker earned her PhD in 2002 at the University of Sydney and worked at the University of Wollongong on fire ecology projects before joining the New South Wales Office of Environment & Heritage (later NSW National Parks and Wildlife Service).

Her work has focused on fire regimes and biodiversity in south-eastern Australia, including projects for the Greater Blue Mountains World Heritage Area. She served on the Board of Directors of the Ecological Society of Australia in 2014, as Vice-President (Member Communications).

== Selected publications ==
- Tasker, Em; Dickman, Cr (2001). "A review of Elliott trapping methods for small mammals in Australia". Australian Mammalogy. 23 (2): 77. doi:10.1071/AM01077. ISSN 0310-0049.
- Tasker, Elizabeth M.; Bradstock, Ross A. (2006). "Influence of cattle grazing practices on forest understorey structure in north-eastern New South Wales". Austral Ecology. 31 (4): 490–502. Bibcode:2006AusEc..31..490T. doi:10.1111/j.1442-9993.2006.01597.x. ISSN 1442-9993.
- Tasker, Elizabeth M. (2004). "Wildlife, Fire and Future Climate: A Forest Ecosystem Analysis". Austral Ecology. 29 (3): 361–362. Bibcode:2004AusEc..29..361T. doi:10.1111/j.1442-9993.2004.01411.x. ISSN 1442-9993.
