= Fiona A. White =

Australian psychologist

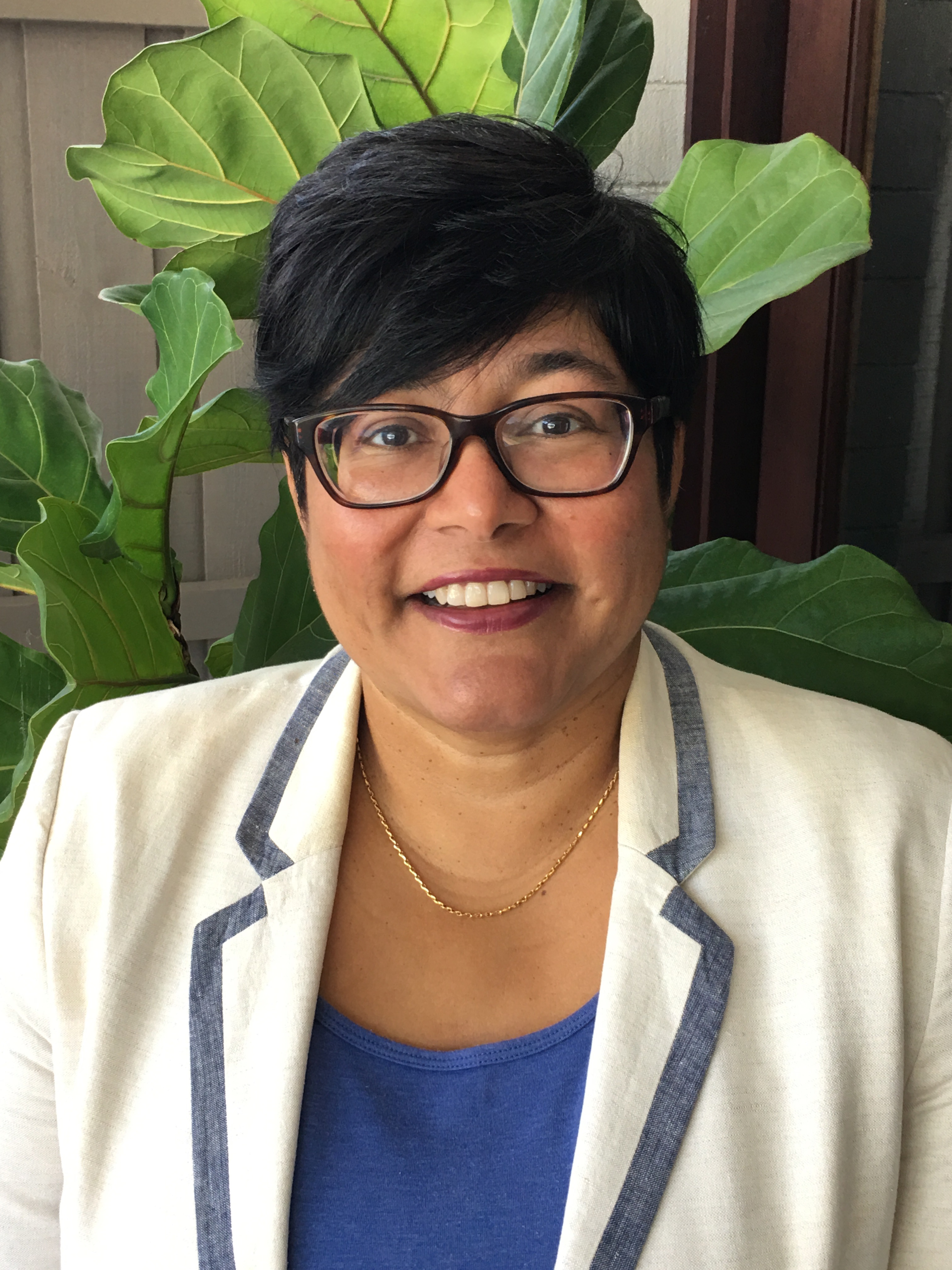
Fiona A. White

Fiona A. White is an Australian academic. She is a professor of social psychology at the University of Sydney, Australia, and director of the Sydney University Psychology of Intergroup Relations (SUPIR) Lab., and degree coordinator of the Bachelor of Liberal Arts and Science (BLAS). White is known as the developer of the E-contact intervention, a synchronous online tool that has been found to reduce anxiety, prejudice, and stigma.

== Career ==
White's research is noted for advancing new and effective strategies (i.e., cooperative Electronic- or E-contact; dual identity recategorization; perspective taking etc) to promote positive intergroup relations in the short- and long-term.

Her most significant contribution to the intergroup relations literature is the development and validation of the E-contact tool, a computer mediated text-based contact that involves a synchronous conversation between members from non-stigmatised and stigmatised groups. Fiona has led a number of prejudice and stigma reduction research projects, and has received competitive funding from the Australian Research Council, and ViCHealth.

== Research area and topics of interest ==
=== E-contact and long-term bias reduction ===
White's Dual Identity Electronic Contact (DIEC) program advanced a new conceptual framework proposing that cognitive strategies such as dual identity recategorization provides a necessary mechanism to enhance the benefits of social (i.e., contact) strategies such as E-contact, a program that was found to successfully promote and sustain (at a 1-year follow-up) bias reduction for both Muslim and Catholic high-school students who were religiously segregated.

=== E-contact and short-term bias reduction ===
White has also developed and evaluated a new lab-based version of E-contact which involves participants text chatting in a synchronous 15-minute online interaction with an outgroup member. This new short-form version of E-contact is also theoretically-framed by integrating Allport's facilitating conditions of contact and dual identity recategorization, and has received significant empirical support across multiple social and cultural contexts: amongst sexual minorities; Protestants and Catholics in Northern Ireland; mentally healthy people and people with schizophrenia; and Turkish and Kurdish peoples.

=== A refocusing on the 'intergroup' nature of prejudice ===
White's research adopts an intergroup perspective to prejudice, where both ingroup and outgroup voices need be included in interventions in order to successfully reduce intergroup tensions and conflicts.

=== 'The School That Tried to End Racism' (TSTTTER) ===
In 2021, White led a three-week school program showcased in the Australian Broadcasting Corporation (ABC) show 'The School That Tried to End Racism' where students engaged in teacher-led classroom activities and conversations which included: stereotyping as an antecedent to racism; cardboard cut-out friends; the stolen generation; understanding the complexity of an Australian identity; media misrepresentation in Australia; and racial jokes as a form of casual racism. The show received national coverage and great interest from school leaders across Australia. TSTTTER was nominated for the 2021 Australian Academy of Cinema and Television Arts Awards (AACTA) and 2022 Logie Awards for the most outstanding factual or documentary program.

== Awards and grants ==
- Australian Research Council Discovery Grant (2009–11)

== Selected publications ==
- Bagci, S., Guvensoy, I., Turner, R. N., White, F. A., & Piyale, Z. E. (2021). Investigating the Role of E-contact and Self-disclosure on Improving Turkish-Kurdish Interethnic Relations. Journal of Applied Social Psychology, 51,577-593. doi:10.1111/jasp.12760
- Boccanfuso, E., White, F. A., & Maunder, R.D. (2021). Reducing Transgender Stigma via an E-contact Intervention. Sex Roles, 84, 326–336. doi:10.1007/s11199-020-01171-9
- Maunder, R., White, F. (2019). Intergroup contact and mental health stigma: A comparative effectiveness meta-analysis. Clinical Psychology Review, 72, 1-12. doi:10.1016/j.cpr.2019.101749
- Maunder, R., White, F., Verrelli, S. (2019). Modern avenues for intergroup contact: Using E-contact and intergroup emotions to reduce stereotyping and social distancing against people with schizophrenia. Group Processes and Intergroup Relations, 22(7), 947-963. doi:10.1177/1368430218794873
- White, F., Abu-Rayya, H. (2012). A dual identity-electronic contact (DIEC) experiment promoting short- and long-term intergroup harmony. Journal of Experimental Social Psychology, 48(3), 597-608. doi:10.1016/j.jesp.2012.01.007
- White, F., Abu-Rayya, H., Bliuc, A., Faulkner, N. (2015). Emotion expression and intergroup bias reduction between Muslims and Christians: Long-term Internet contact. Computers in Human Behavior, 53, 435-442. doi:10.1016/j.chb.2015.04.074
- White, F., Abu-Rayya, H., Weitzel, C. (2014). Achieving twelve-months of intergroup bias reduction: The dual identity-electronic contact (DIEC) experiment. International Journal of Intercultural Relations, 38,158-163. doi:10.1016/j.jesp.2012.01.007
- White, F., Borinca, I., Vezzali, L., Reynolds, K., Blomster Lyshol, J., Verrelli, S., Falomir-Pichastor, J. (2021). Beyond direct contact: The theoretical and societal relevance of indirect contact for improving intergroup relations. Journal of Social Issues, 77, 132-153. doi:10.1111/josi.12400
- White, F., Harvey, L., Verrelli, S. (2015). Including Both Voices: A New Bidirectional Framework for Understanding and Improving Intergroup Relations. Australian Psychologist, 50, 421-433. doi:10.1111/ap.12108
- White, F., Livesey, D., Hayes, B. (2015). Developmental Psychology: From Infancy to Adulthood (4e). Australia: Pearson Australia.
- White, F., Turner, R., Verrelli, S., Harvey, L., Hanna, J. (2019). Improving intergroup relations between Catholics and Protestants in Northern Ireland via E-contact. European Journal of Social Psychology, 49(2), 429-438. doi:10.1002/ejsp.2515
- White, F., Verrelli, S., Maunder, R., Kervinen, A. (2019). Using Electronic Contact to Reduce Homonegative Attitudes, Emotions, and Behavioral Intentions Among Heterosexual Women and Men: A Contemporary Extension of the Contact Hypothesis. Journal of Sex Research, 56(9), 1179-1191. doi:10.1080/00224499.2018.149194
