= Percival Halse Rogers =

Australian jurist and university chancellor

Sir Percival Halse Rogers KBE

10th Chancellor of the University of Sydney
- In office 1936–1941
- Preceded by: Sir Mungo William MacCallum KCSG
- Succeeded by: Sir Charles Bickerton Blackburn KCMG OBE

Personal details
- Born: 1 August 1883 Gunnedah, New South Wales
- Died: 7 October 1945 (aged 62) Darling Point, New South Wales
- Spouse: Mabel Mary (née Trevor Jones)
- Relations: Rev. William Halse Rogers (father)
- Children: Judith Cecilie Halse Rogers (1914-1970) and Lorraine Halse Rogers (1918-2007)
- Education: Newington College (1896-1901); St Andrew's College, University of Sydney; Worcester College, University of Oxford
- Occupation: NSW Supreme Court Judge
- Profession: Law
- Website: University of Sydney Chancellor

Sir Percival Halse Rogers KBE (1 August 1883 – 7 October 1945) was an Australian jurist and university chancellor.

== Early life ==
Halse Rogers was born in Gunnedah, New South Wales, the second son of a Methodist minister and was educated at Newington College (1896-1901). He became a resident of St Andrew's College, at the University of Sydney and graduated BA in 1905. Outstanding as a student and sportsman he was the second Rhodes scholar from New South Wales and attended Worcester College, Oxford, graduating BCL in 1908.

== Legal career ==
On his return to Sydney, Halse Rogers became a temporary clerk in the Crown Law Office and then Judge's associate to New South Wales Chief Justice Sir William Cullen. Halse Rogers was admitted to the New South Wales Bar in 1911 and married later that year. From 1919 he lectured part-time on legal interpretation at the University of Sydney and in 1926 was commissioned KC. In 1928 he was appointed as a judge of the Supreme Court of New South Wales sitting in the common law jurisdiction and presiding in the commercial cases. He served four times as a royal commissioner, conducting inquiries into greyhound-racing licences and fruit machines in 1932. In 1941, he chaired a federal royal commission into the Winkler case.

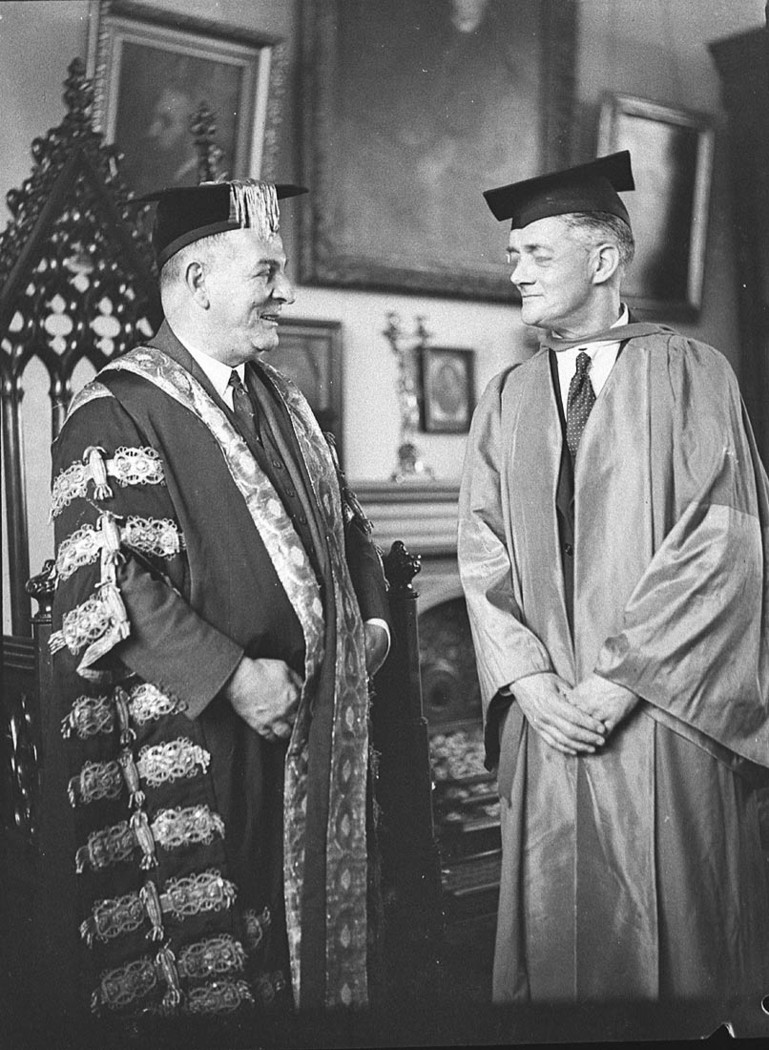
Halse Rogers wearing the robes of Chancellor of the University of Sydney (left) after conferring an Honorary Doctor of Laws upon Lord Nuffield

== Community service ==
Halse Rogers was a director of Sydney Hospital and a member of the executive committee of the Fairbridge Farm Schools of New South Wales. A fellow of the senate of the University of Sydney from 1929, he was deputy chancellor from 1934 until elected chancellor in 1936. He was appointed KBE in 1939. Placed in an embarrassing position as chancellor when promised senate support was withheld, he resigned.

== Personal life ==
Halse Rogers married Mabel Trevor Jones and had two daughters. In 1936, the Halse Rogers went on a 3-year trip to Europe, the UK, and the United States. In Germany, they attended the 1936 Berlin Olympics. Daughter Judith, an actress, later became a newsreader for the ABC during World War II.

Halse Rogers died of a heart attack on Sunday, 7 October 1945 in Darling Point.

== Bibliography ==
- J. M. Bennett, 'Rogers, Sir Percival Halse (1883 - 1945)', Australian Dictionary of Biography, Volume 11, Melbourne University Press, 1988, pp 442–443.
