= Nikos Athanasou =

Australian writer and pathologist (born 1953)

Nikos Athanasou (born 1953) is an Australian short story writer and novelist and musculoskeletal pathologist and scientist. He was born in Perth and grew up in Sydney where he studied medicine. He moved to England and is currently Professor of Musculoskeletal Pathology at Oxford University and a Fellow of Wadham College.

== Short story writer and novelist ==
His collection of twenty short stories Hybrids was published in 1995. These character-based short stories illustrated the sense of dislocation felt by Greek Australians and Greeks in Australia who see themselves as neither wholly Greek nor Australian but as a specific hybrid species formed by the influence of Greek and Australian cultures. Greek traditions sit uneasily in the new world society of Australia and contrarily, Australian attitudes clash with the social customs and outlook of Greeks. A second collection of twenty short stories, "Late Hybrids" was published in 2024; these stories highlighted not just cultural differences amongst later generation Greek-Australians, Greeks and Australians but also the distinctive psyche of Greek Australians when they encounter issues of life, love, death and duty to one’s past

His first novel, The Greek Liar, was published in 2002. It examined Greek Australian society and examined the effect of Greek social structures and the pursuit of materialistic goals on the Greek-Australian quest for identity.

His second novel The Person of the Man, published in 2012, continues this existential theme, examining the feelings underlying an outwardly successful but secretly flawed marriage. The betrayal and tragedy that follow show that love cannot be analysed: it can only be understood.

His third novel Palindrome, published in 2016 is a cerebral crime novel set in the none-too-virtuous world of modern Oxford town and gown.

== Musculoskeletal pathologist and scientist ==
As Nicholas Athanasou he has written widely on bone, joint, and soft tissue pathology and the pathobiology of osteoarticular cells and tissues. With TJ Chambers he developed the osteoclast lacunar bone resorption assay system. His work was the first to show that the human osteoclast shares specific surface antigens with macrophages and that the mononuclear human osteoclast precursor circulates in the (CD14+) monocyte fraction. This led to the discovery of cellular and molecular mechanisms of pathological bone resorption associated with primary and secondary bone tumours, particularly breast cancer metastasis, Ewing sarcoma and giant cell–rich lesions such as giant cell tumour of bone and pigmented villonodular synovitis. In addition, his work has studied synovial and inflammatory macrophages and their role in osteoarthritis, rheumatoid arthritis, infection and Paget disease. His work on hip and knee implants focused on the importance of biomaterial wear particles on promoting osteoclast formation, osteolysis and implant loosening. He also characterised inflammatory criteria for the histological diagnosis of infection using frozen section procedure and was the first to provide a pathological description of pseudotumors associated with metal on metal hip implants.
