= Normand MacLaurin =

Australian politician

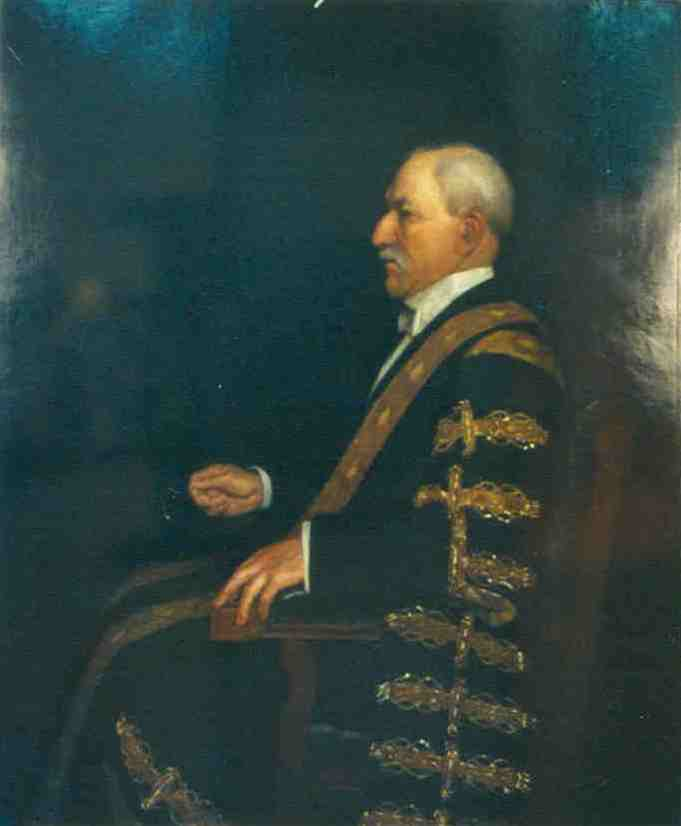
Sir Henry Normand MacLaurin, Chancellor of the University of Sydney.

Sir Henry Normand MacLaurin, (known as Normand MacLaurin; 10 December 1835 in Kilconquhar, Scotland – 24 August 1914 in Sydney, Australia), was a Scottish-born physician, company director, Australian politician and university administrator.

== Biography ==
MacLaurin was born in Kilconquhar, Fife, Scotland, the son of James MacLaurin, M.A. schoolmaster and Catherine, née Brearcliffe. He was educated at home. At 15 years of age he won a bursary at the University of St Andrews and took the degree of M.A., graduating in 1854 at 19 years of age.

Both parents died before he was 19. With help from his only brother, Rev. James MacLaurin, and some fees he had earned through tutoring, he enrolled in medicine at the University of Edinburgh. He qualified as M.D. in 1857 (aged 22) and subsequently served on eight different ships in the Royal Navy.

In the course of his naval service, on 4 February 1868 he reached Port Phillip, and then Sydney in conjunction with the Royal Visit to Australia of Alfred, Duke of Edinburgh. On 1 October 1868 he decided to register with the Medical Board of New South Wales, where he met Dr Charles Nathan and his family. He was obliged to return with his ship to England, but in May 1871 he obtained 12 months' leave and returned to Sydney where he married Eliza Ann née Nathan at St James' Church on 6 October 1871. (Eliza Nathan was the daughter of Charles, and the granddaughter of Isaac Nathan.) He was dropped from the navy list in January 1873.

MacLaurin went to Parramatta, and then after his father-in-law's death in September 1872, to Macquarie Street, Sydney. and became good friends with Charles Mackellar.

In 1887 MacLaurin was appointed vice-chancellor of the University of Sydney, becoming chancellor in 1896. He was made a knight bachelor on 15 August 1902, after the honour had been announced in the 1902 Coronation Honours list published on 26 June 1902.

He was awarded the honorary degree Doctor of Laws (LL.D.) from the University of Edinburgh in 1903.

== See also ==
MacLaurin had 4 sons:

- Charles MacLaurin (1872–1925), M.B., B.S., F.R.C.S. was "a medical practitioner" who wrote a number of notable publications.
- Henry Normand MacLaurin (1878–1915), was a barrister and Brigadier General who was killed at the Battle of Gallipoli in 1915.
- J.B. MacLaurin.
- H.C.H. MacLaurin.

Parliament of New South Wales
Political offices
Preceded by Sir Julian Salomons	Vice-President of the Executive Council; Representative of the Government in the Legislative Council; 1893 – 1894	Succeeded by William Suttor Jr.
Academic offices
Preceded by Sir William Windeyer	Chancellor of the University of Sydney; 1896 – 1914	Succeeded by Sir William Cullen
Preceded by Sir William Windeyer	Vice-Chancellor of the University of Sydney; 1887 – 1889	Succeeded by Sir Arthur Renwick
