= Elizabeth Bannan =

Australian educationist (1909–1977)

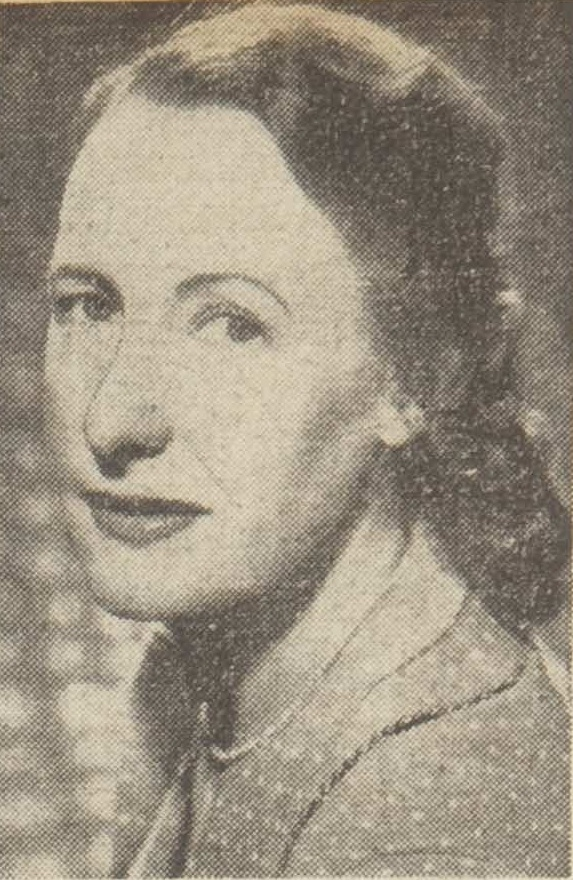
Bannan in 1950

Elizabeth Margaret Bannan BEM (1909–1977) was an Australian educationist.

Elizabeth Bannan was born on 5 June 1909 in North Sydney, New South Wales. She attended Fort Street Girls' High School, and later in life was the President of the Old Girls' Union. In 1931 earned a B.A. from the University of Sydney, during which time she led the Women's Union Debating team. She was awarded the Albert prize for anthropology, the Peter Board prize for education, Walter Beavis prize and the Jones medal.

Bannan taught at government secondary schools prior to her appointment in 1937 as lecturer at Teachers' College. In 1939 she was selected to exchange places with an academic from the University of Oregon. She became warden of women students there in 1943. In 1950 she spent nine months in the USA on the Carnegie Scholarship. In 1954 Bannan was Acting Principal of the college.

Bannan was particularly interested in the use of radio in school tuition.

Bannan died of a coronary occlusion on 26 July 1977 in Ballina.
