= James Rowland (RAAF officer) =

Royal Australian Air Force chief and New South Wales governor

Sir James Rowland AC, KBE, DFC, AFC
- Official RAAF portrait of Air Marshal Rowland

33rd Governor of New South Wales
- In office 20 January 1981 – 20 January 1989
- Monarch: Queen Elizabeth II
- Premier: Neville Wran (1981–86); Barrie Unsworth (1986–88); Nick Greiner (1988–89)
- Lieutenant: Sir Laurence Street
- Preceded by: Sir Roden Cutler
- Succeeded by: Sir David Martin

Personal details
- Born: James Anthony Rowland; 1 November 1922 Armidale, New South Wales
- Died: 27 May 1999 (aged 76) Sydney, New South Wales
- Profession: Air Force officer

Military service
- Allegiance: Australia
- Branch/service: Royal Australian Air Force
- Service years: 1942–1979
- Rank: Air Marshal
- Unit: No. 635 Squadron RAF
- Commands: ARDU (1956–59); No. 3 Aircraft Depot (1966–69); RAAF Technical Services (1972–75); Chief of the Air Staff (1975–79)
- Battles/wars: World War II
- Awards: Companion of the Order of Australia; Knight Commander of the Order of the British Empire; Distinguished Flying Cross; Air Force Cross

Air Marshal Sir James Anthony Rowland, AC, KBE, DFC, AFC (1 November 1922 – 27 May 1999) was a senior commander in the Royal Australian Air Force (RAAF), serving as Chief of the Air Staff (CAS) from 1975 to 1979. He held office as Governor of New South Wales from 1981 to 1989, and was Chancellor of the University of Sydney from 1990 to 1991.

Born in rural New South Wales, Rowland cut short his aeronautical engineering studies at the University of Sydney to join the RAAF in 1942. He was posted to Britain and served as a bomber pilot with the Pathfinders in the air war over Europe, earning the Distinguished Flying Cross in 1944. The following year he was forced to bail out over Germany following a collision with another Allied aircraft, and spent the rest of the war as a prisoner.

After repatriation and demobilisation, Rowland gained his engineering degree and rejoined the RAAF. He became a test pilot, serving with and later commanding the Aircraft Research and Development Unit in the 1950s, and also a senior engineering officer, being closely involved in preparations for delivery to Australia of the Dassault Mirage III supersonic fighter in the 1960s. In 1972, he was promoted to air vice marshal and became Air Member for Technical Services, holding this post until his elevation to air marshal and appointment as CAS in March 1975. He was the first engineering officer to lead the RAAF, and the first man to personally command it in a legal sense, following abolition of the Australian Air Board in 1976. Knighted in 1977, Rowland retired from the Air Force in 1979 and became Governor of New South Wales in January 1981. He was appointed a Companion of the Order of Australia in 1987. Retiring from the Governorship in 1989, he held a place on several boards as well as the Chancellorship of the University of Sydney.

== Early life and World War II ==
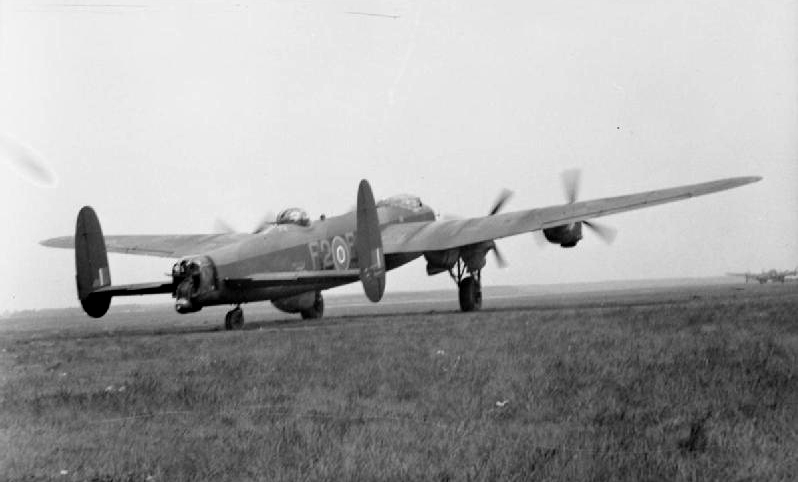
Lancaster of No. 635 Squadron RAF, May 1945

Rowland was born in Armidale, New South Wales, on 1 November 1922. He was the son of Louis Rowland, a commander in the Royal Australian Navy, and his wife Elsie. Jim evinced a fascination with aviation from an early age, carving model aeroplanes out of wood. Growing up with his three brothers on the family's 3,000-acre (1,200 ha) rural property, he was schooled via correspondence before completing his secondary education at Cranbrook, Sydney. Rowland entered the University of Sydney to study aeronautical engineering, but left in May 1942 to enlist in the Royal Australian Air Force (RAAF) as a pilot under the Empire Air Training Scheme. In early 1943 he underwent service flying training in Canada. He was commissioned as a pilot officer in July and posted to Britain, where he converted to Handley Page Halifax and Avro Lancaster heavy bombers.

Rowland was assigned to the Pathfinder Force that marked targets for other aircraft on strategic bombing missions over Europe. Considered an exceptional pilot, he became a master bomber with No. 635 Squadron RAF in 1944. As a master bomber, his role was to arrive ahead of the main Allied force, check that flares marking the target were in place, and warn his fellows if they were bombing inaccurately. No. 635 Squadron operated Lancasters, a type that, Rowland recalled, "would forgive sprog pilots doing the most outrageous things to it, and would even bring them home with quite large bits shot off it".

Having been promoted to acting flight lieutenant, Rowland was on a sortie to attack Düsseldorf in December 1944 when he lost one of his engines. He nevertheless continued on to the target where, owing to his lower-than-normal altitude, his aircraft was seriously damaged by anti-aircraft fire before and after he dropped his bombs. Nursing his plane back to base, he was recommended for the Distinguished Flying Cross in recognition of his "great determination and devotion to duty"; the award was promulgated in the London Gazette on 16 February 1945. In January 1945, Rowland's Lancaster collided with a Canadian bomber over Frankfurt, and he had to bail out with his surviving crew. Captured and held by the Gestapo in solitary confinement, he was scheduled to be executed but was saved by two Luftwaffe officers who had learned of his situation. They took him to a prisoner-of-war camp, where he remained until being repatriated at the end of hostilities. None of Rowland's crew survived the war and, though he believed he had done all he could to save them, he suffered survivor guilt.

== Post-war RAAF career ==
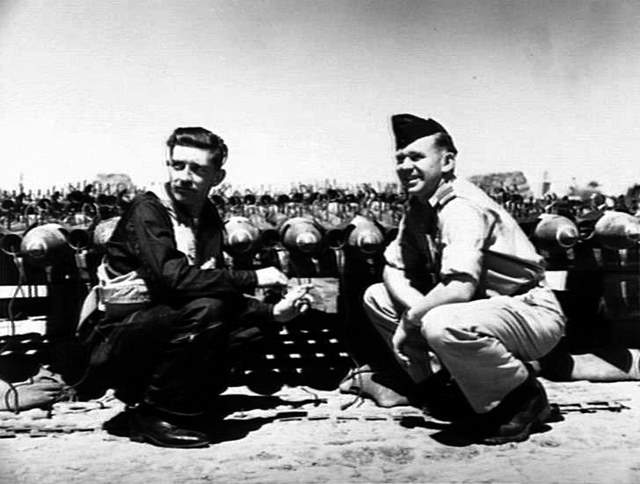
Rowland (right) on a visit to Kimpo, South Korea, with a pilot of No. 77 Squadron, April 1953

Rowland's commission was terminated in November 1945. Returning to Australia, he resumed his studies at the University of Sydney and completed his degree, before rejoining the RAAF as a member of its newly formed Technical Branch in 1947. He was posted to Britain in 1949 to attend the Empire Test Pilots' School. In 1952, he was appointed chief test pilot with the Aircraft Research and Development Unit (ARDU) at RAAF Base Laverton, Victoria. Rowland led trial programs that involved many of the Air Force's early jets such as the Gloster Meteor, de Havilland Vampire, English Electric Canberra, and CAC Sabre. Promoted to squadron leader, he earned the Air Force Cross for his test flying achievements; the award was gazetted on 1 January 1955. He married Faye Doughton on 20 April 1955; the couple had a daughter, Anni.

Rowland attended RAAF Staff College, Point Cook, in 1956. Promoted to wing commander, he took charge of ARDU from November 1956 until June 1959. In 1957, he raised concerns that the supersonic Lockheed F-104 Starfighter, touted as a multi-role replacement for the Sabre, was ill-suited for any purpose except interception. The Defence Minister, Sir Philip McBride, had reached a similar conclusion and kept the Sabre in frontline service until a more suitable aircraft could be chosen, namely the Dassault Mirage III delta-wing fighter. From 1961 to 1964 Rowland was based in Paris, as Technical Staff Officer on the RAAF team preparing for the Mirage's acceptance into Australian service. In contrast to most of the team members, he displayed a talent for language and by his second year was chairing meetings in French with Dassault engineers. After returning to Australia, he was posted to the Directorate of Aircraft Engineering at the Department of Air, Canberra, responsible for ongoing technical oversight of the Mirage.

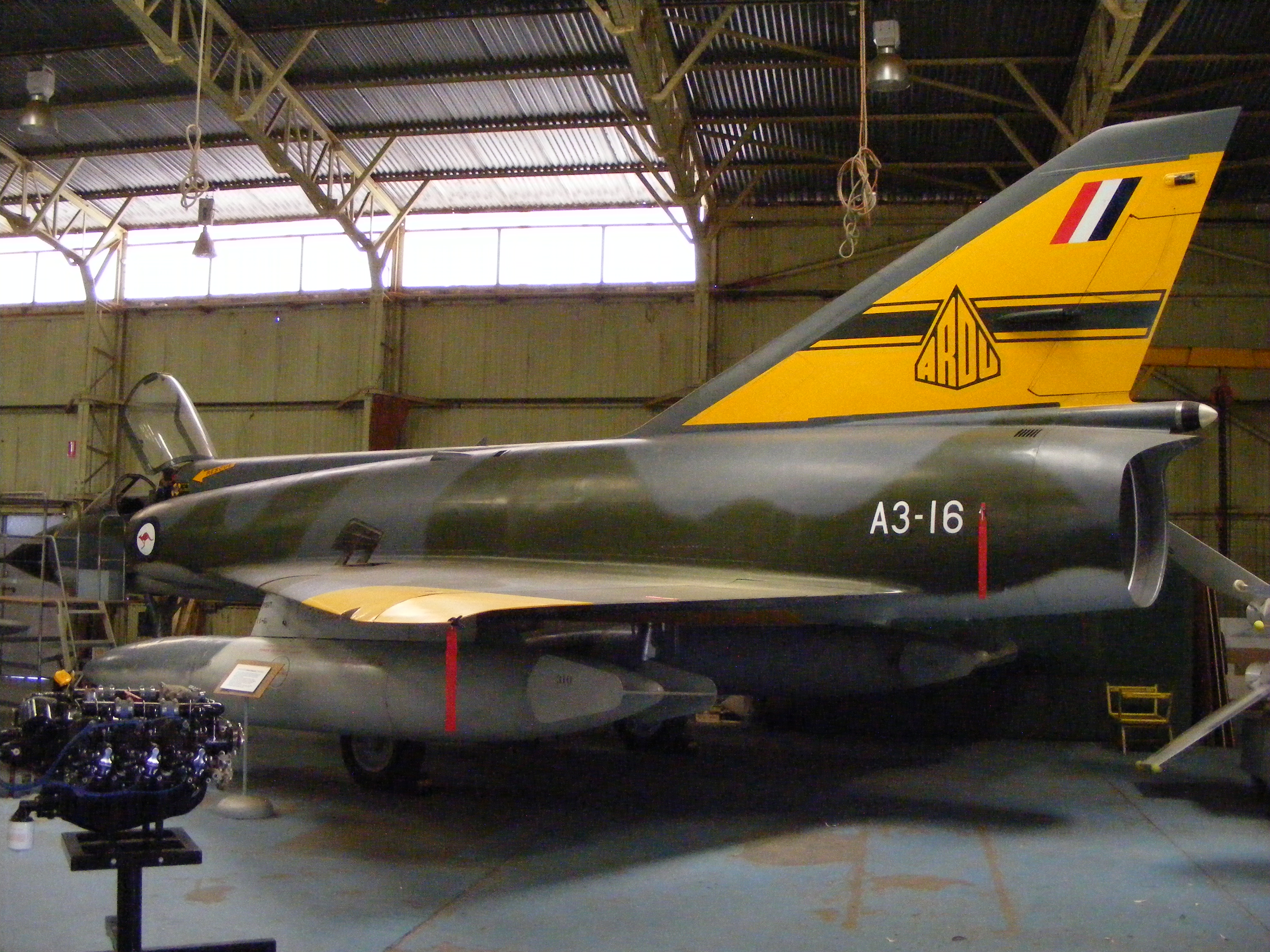
RAAF Mirage fighter in ARDU livery

In December 1966, Rowland became commanding officer of No. 3 Aircraft Depot (No. 3 AD) at RAAF Base Amberley, Queensland, with the acting rank of group captain; his promotion was made substantive in November 1967. After completing his tenure at No. 3 AD in January 1969, Rowland was appointed Senior Engineering Staff Officer at Headquarters Operational Command in Glenbrook, New South Wales. In 1971 he was posted to Britain to attend the Royal College of Defence Studies, London. Returning to Australia, he was Director-General of Aircraft Engineering before being promoted to air vice marshal to serve as Air Member for Technical Services (AMTS), the RAAF's senior engineering position, in November 1972. The AMTS occupied a seat on the Australian Air Board, the service's controlling body that was chaired by the Chief of the Air Staff (CAS).

In March 1975, Rowland was raised to air marshal and took over from Air Marshal Charles Read as CAS, becoming the first appointee to the position who had joined the RAAF after the commencement of World War II. He was also the first engineering officer to lead the RAAF, and was selected over a more senior air vice marshal through the personal influence of the Defence Secretary, Sir Arthur Tange. The CAS was required to be a member of the Air Force's aircrew stream so Rowland, still a qualified pilot, had to transfer from the Technical Branch to the General Duties Branch. Soon afterwards, the stipulation for the CAS to be a member of the General Duties Branch was removed.

1. Whatever you do, it will cost more, and the later you do it the more it will cost
2. There are never enough wires, and if there are they are in the wrong places
3. Whatever you choose there's now a better one available
4. Aircraft always get heavier

— The four "immutable laws" of aircraft acquisition related by Wing Commander Rowland in an address to the Royal Aeronautical Society, Canberra, 1965.

In 1976, Rowland became the first CAS to personally command the RAAF in a legal sense, following dissolution of the Air Board, a consequence of defence reorganisation in the wake of the 1973 "Tange report" that recommended departmental rationalisation. A new Chief of the Air Staff Advisory Committee (CASAC) was set up, but there was no requirement for the CAS to accept its advice. According to historian Alan Stephens, Rowland considered that the "collective wisdom" engendered by the Air Board had been generally beneficial to the RAAF, and believed the new arrangements led to "'paralysis and arrogation of decision making', and empire building in the Public Service component". Though known as a strong committee member who enjoyed a good argument, he "found that the sheer time involved in attending meetings made it very difficult for him to run the Air Force 'the way [he] wanted to'". To facilitate the cross-fertilisation of ideas on air power between senior officers, he inaugurated an annual CAS Symposium. During his term as CAS, Rowland reoriented the RAAF's priorities in line with the Defence of Australia policy, which had been adopted by the government in the early 1970s. As a result, he placed the strongest emphasis on protecting Australia from air attack, followed by conducting air strikes on targets in other countries, and supporting the Army and Navy.

On 11 June 1977, Rowland was appointed a Knight Commander of the Order of the British Empire in the military division. In July the same year, he was awarded the National Medal with First Clasp, given "for diligent long service to the community". Rowland's original three-year tenure as CAS was extended by a year. He retired from the Air Force in March 1979, and was succeeded by his deputy and former classmate at RAAF Staff College, Air Vice Marshal Neville McNamara.

== Governorship and later life ==
Viceregal styles of Sir James Rowland
- Reference style: His Excellency
- Spoken style: Your Excellency

After leaving the Air Force, Rowland continued to live in Canberra, consulting part-time for French arms concern Ofema. In late 1980 he was recommended by the government of Premier Neville Wran to serve as the next Governor of New South Wales, replacing Sir Roden Cutler. Rowland admitted that he did not have "the faintest idea" why he was chosen, and thought that "there must be a lot of people who could do it a lot better than I could". He saw the role as the monarch's representative in New South Wales as helping to provide "a valuable link with an older part of the world". Wran, for his part, was understood to have chosen Rowland largely on the basis of his engaging personality; it was also said that the Premier preferred military men for vice-regal office because "they knew how to take orders". Rowland was duly appointed by Queen Elizabeth II on 20 January 1981. Upon taking office, he declared that he wished to be seen as a "man of the people". To this end, he opened Government House to the public on a more frequent basis, and also extended invitations for official functions to a broader range of society than was previously the case.

As Governor of New South Wales and therefore the senior state governor, Rowland held a dormant commission to serve as Administrator of the Commonwealth and Commander-in-Chief of the Australian Defence Force during absences by the Governor General, and did so six times while in office. On one such occasion he was required to dismiss an old colleague, Air Vice Marshal James Flemming, from his position as director of the Australian War Memorial, Canberra, after the Government lost faith in Flemming's ability to properly manage the Memorial. Rowland had served as one of Flemming's referees when he applied to head the Memorial in 1982. Journalist and public servant Evan Williams also credited Rowland with being "the first Viceregal whistleblower" for alerting the Wran government to an unusual number of early release requests for prisoners that he was being asked to sign by Corrective Services Minister Rex Jackson. The inquiries set in motion by Rowland's queries revealed that Jackson was receiving money from criminals for misusing the early release scheme. Forced to resign, Jackson was later charged with corruption and imprisoned.

Rowland was awarded an honorary Doctorate in Engineering by the University of Sydney in 1983, and also appointed a Knight of the Order of St John. He was Honorary Air Commodore of No. 22 Squadron from 1981 to 1989, and Honorary Colonel of the Royal New South Wales Regiment from 1985 to 1989. On 26 January 1987, he was invested as a Companion of the Order of Australia for "service to the Crown and to the people of New South Wales". At Sydney Town Hall on 3 October that year, he took the salute of Vietnam veterans during their official "Welcome Home March". His governorship coincided with Australian Bicentenary celebrations in 1988. A popular Governor, Rowland was considered by his Labor premiers to be "a safe pair of hands", with Rowland himself expressing of his role that "the Governor is a continuity man". His original four-year term was extended twice, each time for two years, by the Wran and Unsworth administrations. On 27 April 1988, Rowland opened the Forty-Ninth New South Wales Parliament with a new premier, Nick Greiner, whose Liberal Party had defeated Labor in the March elections. That November, he took a turn at flying one of the RAAF's recently acquired F/A-18 Hornets piloted by Wing Commander (later Air Vice Marshal) John Kindler. He was succeeded on 20 January 1989 by Rear Admiral Sir David Martin.

After retiring from the Governorship, Rowland served as president of the Royal Humane Society, Chancellor of the University of Sydney from 1990 to 1991, and as a member of the Police Board from 1989 to 1992. He was also a member of the boards of several private companies, including Angus & Coote and Thomson-CSF Pacific Holdings, and Chairman of the Aerospace Foundation of Australia from 1992 until his death in Sydney on 27 May 1999. Sir James Rowland was survived by his wife and daughter, and accorded a state funeral.

In 2016, the RAAF Air Power Development Centre and the Australian Centre for the Study of Armed Conflict and Society at the University of New South Wales jointly established the Sir James Rowland Air Power Seminar to further "a broadened understanding of the origins, evolution, application and depiction of air power in the national interest".

== Notes ==
Military offices
Preceded by Charles Read	Chief of the Air Staff; 1975–1979	Succeeded by Sir Neville McNamara
Government offices
Preceded by Sir Roden Cutler	Governor of New South Wales; 1981–1989	Succeeded by Sir David Martin
Academic offices
Preceded by Sir Hermann Black	Chancellor of the University of Sydney; 1990–1991	Succeeded by Dame Leonie Kramer
