= John Manning Ward =

Australian academic (1919–1990)

John Manning Ward AO FAHA
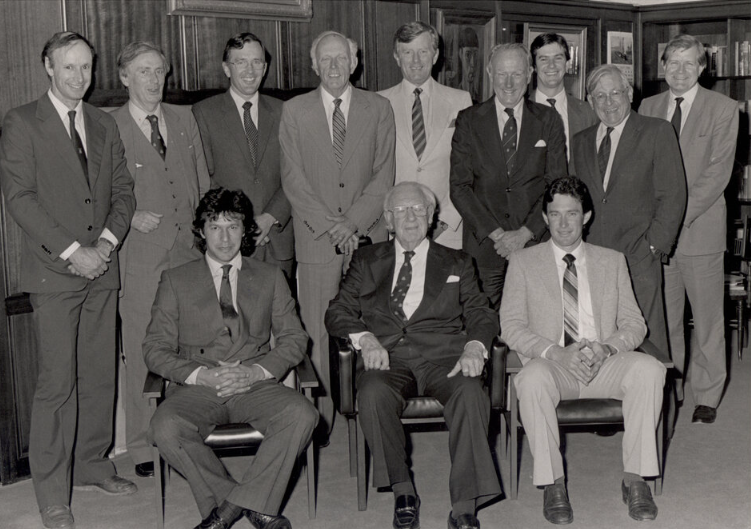
- Ward hosts a 1984 luncheon for Imran Khan before Khan played for the Sydney University club. Seated: Imran Khan, Chancellor Sir Hermann Black and Coach John Dyson. Ward stands second from left.
- Born: 6 July 1919; Sydney, New South Wales
- Died: 6 May 1990 (aged 70); Brooklyn, New South Wales
- Education: Fort Street Boys High School
- Alma mater: University of Sydney

John Manning Ward AO FAHA (6 July 1919 – 6 May 1990) was a Vice-Chancellor and Challis Professor of History at the University of Sydney.

Ward was born in Sydney and was educated at Fort Street Boys High School and the University of Sydney. He was admitted to the NSW Bar in 1948.

== Career ==
Professor Ward served as Challis Professor of History from 1948 to 1979. He steered the History Department through a period of scarce resources into an era of expansion.

He was appointed visiting professor at Yale University in 1963; visiting fellow at All Souls College, Oxford in 1968; and was the Smuts Visiting Fellow at Cambridge University in 1972.

Ward was a Foundation Fellow of the Australian Academy of the Humanities in 1969. He was appointed an Officer of the Order of Australia in the 1983 Australia Day Honours for service to education.

=== University administration ===
Ward had previously been Fellow of Senate from 1974 to 1977, and took office as vice-chancellor of the University of Sydney in 1981 and held that position until 1990. He was the first University of Sydney graduate to have held that post since the university's foundation. Professor Ward was a member of the university staff for 47 years.

== Books ==
He produced major books and articles on British, Imperial and Australian history. His books include British Policy in the South Pacific, 1796-1893 (reprinted three times); Earl Grey and the Australian Colonies, 1847-1856; Colonial Self-Government, the British Experience, 1759-1856; and James Macarthur, Colonial Conservative, 1798-1867, the latter being the first in a trilogy on conservatism in Australia. Professor Ward had planned on retirement to complete the other two books in the series.

== Death ==
On 6 May 1990, Professor Ward, together with his wife Patricia, 69, and his daughter Jennifer, 36, were on board the 3801 steam train on a Sunday excursion run from the Hunter Valley to Sydney. They were all killed when a commuter train collided with the rear of the steam train in the Cowan rail accident. The collision also killed Moira Jennings, the wife of the registrar, as well as injuring several other members of the university.
