= Gavin Brown (academic) =

Scottish-Australian mathematician and university administrator

Gavin Brown AO FAA
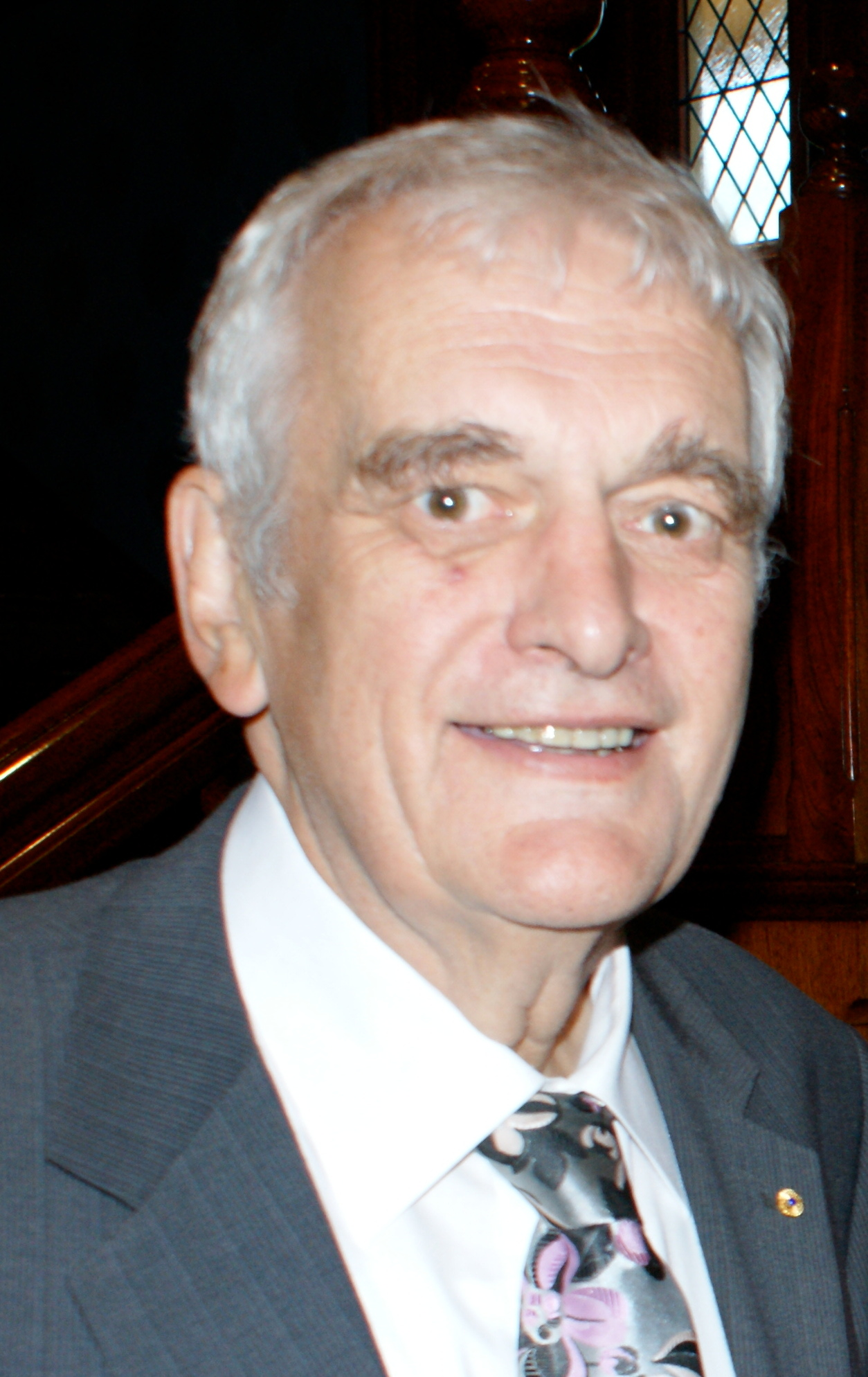
- Brown in Adelaide, South Australia, 2009

Vice-Chancellor of the University of Sydney
- In office 1996–2008
- Preceded by: Derek Anderson
- Succeeded by: Michael Spence

16th Vice-Chancellor of the University of Adelaide
- In office 1994–1996
- Chancellor: Bill Scammell
- Preceded by: Kevin Marjoribanks
- Succeeded by: Mary O'Kane

Personal details
- Born: 27 February 1942 Lundin Links, Fife, Scotland
- Died: 25 December 2010 (aged 68) Adelaide, Australia
- Education: University of St Andrews; University of Newcastle-upon-Tyne
- Profession: Mathematician

Gavin Brown AO FAA (27 February 1942 – 25 December 2010) was a Scottish-born mathematician and long-serving vice-chancellor and principal of the University of Sydney between 1996 and 2008.

== Early career ==
Gavin Brown was born on 27 February 1942 in Lundin Links, Fife, Scotland, the son of a bricklayer.

After attending secondary school at Madras College in St Andrews on a scholarship, he graduated as science dux. He received a Harkness Scholarship to the University of St Andrews, where he entered the second-year class in mathematics. He graduated with a Master of Arts degree (1st Class Honours and the Duncan Medal) in 1963, followed by a Doctor of Philosophy degree from the University of Newcastle upon Tyne in 1966. His thesis was titled "Norm and stability properties of semi-algebras.

== Career ==
Brown's academic career began at the University of Liverpool, where he became a senior lecturer in mathematics. He then spent some years lecturing at the universities of Paris, Illinois, Washington, Edinburgh, and Liverpool.

He was appointed Chair of Pure Mathematics at the University of New South Wales (UNSW) in 1975, and he and his family emigrated to Australia. At UNSW, Brown held a number of academic administrative posts, including Head of the Department of Pure Mathematics, Head of the School of Mathematics, and Dean of the Faculty of Science.

In 1992, Brown became the deputy vice-chancellor (research) at the University of Adelaide. In 1994, he became the vice-chancellor. He took up the position of vice-chancellor and principal of the University of Sydney in 1996 and retired from the post in 2008.

== Other activities ==
Brown wrote more than 100 research papers and served on the board of several international journals. His research areas were broad, including harmonic analysis, measure theory and algebraic geometry.

Brown was actively involved in the work of the Australian Research Council as a chairman of various funding committees from 1988 to 1993, and a member of the Council from 1992 to 1993.

== Recognition and honours ==
During his time at UNSW, Brown was awarded the Sir Edmund Whittaker Memorial Prize and the Australian Mathematical Society Medal.

He was awarded an honorary Doctor of Laws by the University of St Andrews (1997) and an honorary Doctor of Laws by the University of Dundee (2004).

In 2006, he was appointed an Officer of the Order of Australia.

== Later life, death and legacy ==
Brown returned to Adelaide after retiring in 2008. He died of a heart attack on Christmas Day in 2010.

The Gavin Brown Prize has been awarded by the Australian Mathematical Society since 2011 "for an outstanding and innovative piece of research in the Mathematical Sciences published by a member or members of the Society".

== Personal life ==
Brown married first Barbara Routh, and, following her death, Diané Ranck.

Academic offices
Preceded by Kevin Marjoribanks	Vice-Chancellor of the University of Adelaide; 1994–1997	Succeeded by Mary O'Kane

Academic offices
Preceded by Derek Anderson	Vice-Chancellor and Principal of the University of Sydney; 1997–2008	Succeeded by Michael Spence
