= Kim Santow =

Australian judge (1941–2008)

The Honourable Justice Geza Francis Kim Santow AO (11 March 1941 – 10 April 2008) was an Australian Judge of the Supreme Court of New South Wales Court of Appeal.

Santow was the son of Geza Santow, a surgeon and obstetrician who immigrated to Australia from Hungary in the 1930s. Santow was educated at The Friends' School, Hobart and Sydney Grammar School. He graduated from the University of Sydney with a Bachelor of Arts and Master of Laws and a Blue in rowing.

From 1965 to 1993, he was a partner at Freehill Hollingdale & Page, where he recruited and mentored David Gonski. He served as a Judge on the Equity Division of the Supreme Court from 1993, and on the Court of Appeal since 2002. He was remembered for his contribution to the resolution of commercial disputation, such as the practical benefit consideration in his judgment in Musumeci v Winadell Pty Ltd (1994) 34 NSWLR 723, and his judgments on the prohibition of collateral benefits in takeover bids and the imposition of civil penalty and disqualification orders upon defaulting directors. Santow retired from his judicial office at the end of 2007.

He was a part-time law lecturer at the University of Sydney and the University of New South Wales. From 2001 to 2007, he was the Chancellor of the University of Sydney from 2 October 2001 to 31 May 2007. Santow was a visiting scholar at Harvard, Cornell and at Lincoln's Inn, London. He was a director of various companies and sat on a variety of government and charity committees, such as the Art Gallery of New South Wales, St Vincent's Hospital and the Malcolm Sargent Fund for Children With Cancer.

In 1990, he was awarded a Medal of the Order of Australia, which was upgraded to an Officer of the Order of Australia in the 2007 Queen's Birthday Honours.

He died, aged 67, from a brain tumour on 10 April 2008. He was survived by his wife Lee and his three sons, Simon, William and Edward. Edward Santow was Australian Human Rights Commissioner in 2016-2021.

Academic offices
Preceded by Dame Leonie Kramer	Chancellor of the University of Sydney; 2001–2007	Succeeded by Marie Bashir
