= Herbert Maitland =

Australian surgeon

Sir Herbert Maitland
- Born: 12 November 1868; Surry Hills, New South Wales
- Died: 23 May 1923 (aged 54); Sydney
- Education: Newington College; University of Sydney
- Occupation: Surgeon
- Title: Sir Herbert Maitland
- Spouse(s): Mabel Agnes, née Cook
- Children: Two sons
- Parent(s): Duncan Mearns Maitland and Emily, née Dalgety

Sir Herbert Lethington Maitland (12 November 1868 – 23 May 1923) was an Australian surgeon of the head and neck who was an early specialist in rhinoplasty.

== Early life ==
Bert Maitland was born in Surry Hills, Sydney, Australia, the son of Duncan Mearns Maitland and Emily, née Dalgety. He attended Newington College (1883–1887) and went up to the University of Sydney in 1888 from whence he graduated as a Bachelor of Medicine and Chirurgery with first-class honours in 1892.

== Medical career ==
After graduation he became a resident medical officer at Sydney Hospital and in 1893 a senior R.M.O. The following year Maitland began private practice in Elizabeth Street, Sydney and in 1895 he was appointed an honorary assistant surgeon at Sydney. He was appointed to the senior staff in 1902 and lectured to Sydney Hospital nurses from 1900 until 1909. When Sydney Hospital became a clinical school in 1909, Maitland was the first lecturer in clinical surgery. He was a councillor of the local branch of the British Medical Association from 1904 until 1916 and president for two years after that. Maitland also served as consultant surgeon at the Crown Street Women's Hospital, South Sydney Women's Hospital and The Coast Hospital. During World War I, Maitland was a surgeon and temporary lieutenant-colonel in the Australian Army Medical Corps at the 4th Australian General Hospital, Randwick. In 1914 the Maitlands moved to a home and consulting rooms at 147 Macquarie Street, Sydney that is now a wing of the Royal Australasian College of Physicians headquarters. Two years later he became a director of Sydney Hospital and served on the house committee.

== Sportsman ==
Maitland played Rugby Union for Newtown and during the 1890s was a regular boxer in Sydney. He was Honorary Surgeon at Rushcutters Bay Stadium from 1908. He played cricket, swam and shot as well as being a noted angler, winning competitions in fly-casting and big-game fishing. Maitland was a skilful and expert angler who sailed from Sydney, Port Hacking and Port Stephens from 1906 to land tuna, kingfish and salmon. He is regarded as the father of game fishing in Australia.

== Death ==
Maitland died in his medical rooms of coronary artery disease. An impromptu mourning procession occurred when doctors, medical students and nurses from Sydney Hospital, and Sydney citizens walked from his home and congregated at Queen Victoria's statue near St James' Church. Survived by his wife, who later married Sir Frederick Edward French, and two sons, a third son had predeceased him, Maitland was buried in Waverley cemetery.

== Honours and memorials ==
- Knight Bachelor – 1915
- Maitland Lecture Hall – 1920, Sydney Hospital
- Maitland Theatre Suite – 1930, Sydney Hospital
- Maitland Oration – Presented since 1935 by Sydney Hospital Medical Alumni Association
- Sir Herbert Maitland Stakes – A weight-for-age event at Victoria Park Racecourse, Sydney
- A posthumous portrait by John Longstaff – 1944, Art Gallery of New South Wales

== Bibliography ==
- Sydney Hospital, Annual Report, 1891–1923
- Royal South Sydney Hospital, Annual Report, 1915, 1923
- Medical Journal of Australia, 8 April 1916, 23 June 1923, 1 December 1928
- Australian Bystander, 21 June 1923
- The Sydney Mail, 23 June 1888, 4 December 1907, 30 May 1923; Sun (Sydney), 24, 25 May 1923
- Sydney Morning Herald, 26 May 1923
- Referee (Sydney), 30 May 1923
- Smith's Weekly (Sydney), 2, 16 June 1923
- Maitland papers (Royal Australasian College of Physicians and State Library of New South Wales)
- Maitland family Bible (Royal Australian Historical Society, Sydney)
