= Stephen Garton =

Australian historian

- Born: 1955 (age 70–71)
- Awards: Fellow of the Australian Academy of the Humanities, the Academy of Social Sciences in Australia and the Royal Australian Historical Society, the Royal Society of New South Wales

Academic work
- Discipline: History
- Institutions: University of Sydney

Stephen Garton AM, FAHA, FRAHS, FASSA FRSN (born 1955) is an Australian historian and Professor of History at the University of Sydney.

== Books ==
- Medicine and Madness: Insanity in NSW 1880-1940 (1988)
- Out of Luck: Poor Australians 1788-1988 (1990)
- The Cost of War: Australians Return (1996)
- Histories of Sexuality: Antiquity to Sexual Revolution (2004)
- Playing the Numbers: Gambling in Harlem between the Wars (with Shane white, Stephen Robertson and Graham White, 2010)
- Preserving the Past: The University of Sydney and the Unified National System of Higher Education 1987-96 (with Julia Horne, 2017)
