= Donald Wood-Smith =

Australian-American plastic surgeon (1931–2026)

Donald Wood-Smith MD, FACS, FRCSEd
- Born: Donald Smith; 30 June 1931; Sydney, New South Wales, Australia
- Died: 22 October 2026 (aged 95)
- Occupation: Professor of Clinical Surgery
- Known for: Plastic and Reconstructive Surgery

Donald Wood-Smith (30 June 1931 – 22 October 2026) was an Australian-American plastic surgeon who was a professor of Clinical Surgery at Columbia University College of Physicians and Surgeons, and an attending surgeon at NewYork-Presbyterian Hospital/Columbia University Medical Center. He was also chairman of the department of Plastic and Reconstructive Surgery at the New York Eye and Ear Infirmary.

== Life and career ==
Wood-Smith was born as Donald Smith in Sydney, Australia, on 30 June 1931, and was educated at Newington College (1944–1947), the University of Sydney Medical School and the Royal College of Surgeons in Edinburgh, Scotland. He was then a resident at NYU Langone Medical Center and Manhattan Eye, Ear and Throat Hospital and as a fellow at Bellevue Hospital and Santa Clara Valley Medical Center.

He was quoted in the press on issues related to cosmetic and reconstructive surgery.

Wood-Smith died on 22 October 2026, at the age of 95.
