= Charles George McDonald =

Australian physician (1892–1970)

- Born: March 25, 1892
- Died: April 23, 1970 (aged 78)

Lieutenant Colonel Sir Charles George McDonald KCMG KBE KCSG FRCP (25 March 1892 – 23 April 1970) was an Australian physician, army officer and academic. He was noted for his work as a physician in the field of Tuberculosis and during the Second World War served in Greece and Palestine as a lieutenant colonel in the Australian Imperial Force. On his return to Australia, he served in various academic positions culminating in his appointment as Chancellor of the University of Sydney in 1964.

== Early life and education ==
McDonald was born at Newcastle, New South Wales, the youngest of five sons of Irishman William McDonald and Australian Mary, née Slattery. He attended preparatory schools in Singleton, first the Convent School of the Sisters of Mercy and later Singleton Superior Public School, where the headmaster tutored him privately in Latin and French. Following his family's removal to Sydney, he attended Sydney Boys High School from which he graduated in 1910 after having co-founded the school magazine, the Record, and serving as Senior Prefect (1909–10). He would later go on to be President of the Sydney High School Old Boys' Union. He enrolled in Medicine at the University of Sydney where he debated, edited the Sydney University Medical Journal for four years and presided over the Medical Society.

== Career as a physician ==
Graduating from the Sydney Medical School in 1916, he went on to serve as Assistant-Editor of the Medical Journal of Australia, publishing tens of papers and editorials, most of them on the subject of tuberculosis. From 1920 he was honorary assistant-physician in the tuberculosis clinic at Royal Prince Alfred Hospital, where he remained as an honorary physician until his death, serving on its board from 1964 until 1970. He also worked as a physician at various other hospitals throughout Sydney before setting up in practice with Professor A. E. Mills in Macquarie Street, Sydney.

He obtained a Master of Surgery in 1928 from the University of Sydney.

His work in the field of tuberculosis began in the military anti-tuberculosis dispensary at Randwick and was developed in various positions, including as honorary advisor on tuberculosis to the Australian Red Cross Society and examiner for admissions to the Queen Victoria Homes for Consumptives.

He co-founded the Royal Australasian College of Physicians in 1938, and served as councillor (1938–62), Secretary (1944–48), Vice-President (1948–50), Censor-in-Chief (1950–54) and President of the College (1954–56) successively. He was elected a Fellow of the Royal College of Physicians in London in 1956. McDonald also served as editor-in-chief of the Australasian Annals of Medicine publication.

McDonald served as member of the State Medical Board from 1946 to 1962 and as Chairman of the Australian Rheumatism Council from 1953 onwards.

== Military career ==
His first military appointment was as a captain in the Australian Imperial Force on 17 June 1918 and was transferred to the Officers' Reserve on 29 October 1919.

Following the outbreak of the Second World War, he was appointed lieutenant colonel in the Australian Imperial Force on 1 July 1940, serving in Greece, Crete, Palestine and Gaza from 1941 to 1942. He returned to Sydney on 27 February 1943, having been mentioned in despatches and was again transferred to the Officers' Reserve.

== Academic career ==
McDonald lectured in Clinical Medicine at the University of Sydney from 1938 but the outbreak of war saw him involved in foreign campaigns until 1943 when he resumed lecturing, continuing until 1952.

In 1942 McDonald was elected to the University Senate, going on to be Deputy-Chancellor in 1953 and Chancellor from 1964 to 1969, when demonstrations against the Vietnam War reached extreme intensity. He was the first Catholic Chancellor of the University of Sydney.

He served as a trustee of the Public Library of New South Wales and as Chairman of the Sancta Sophia College Council at the University of Sydney.

== Personal life and family ==
Sir Charles was a staunch Catholic, and was made a Knight Commander of the Papal Order of St. Gregory the Great in 1960. He founded the Newman Association of Catholic Graduates at the University of Sydney and assisted in the establishment of the Catholic Medical Guild of St Luke. He was also a close friend of Cardinal Sir Norman Thomas Gilroy, Archbishop of Sydney.

McDonald married Elsie Isobel Hosie, a pianist and stenographer, at Sacred Heart Church in Mosman in 1919. They had four sons who attended Saint Ignatius' College, Riverview, amongst them Geoffrey, Dux of Riverview in 1937 and later President of the Royal Australasian College of Physicians, like his father; John, a paediatrician; and Fr Charles McDonald, SJ, a Jesuit priest and long-term debating master at Riverview; as well as a daughter, Molly, who was Head Girl of Sacred Heart Convent, Rose Bay and Senior Student at Sancta Sophia College, University of Sydney.

He was appointed Commander of the Most Excellent Order of the British Empire in 1951, Knight bachelor in 1962, Knight Commander of the Order of the British Empire and Knight Commander of the Most Distinguished Order of St Michael and St George in 1970.

Sir Charles McDonald died on 23 April 1970 in Sydney.
