= David S. Clarke =

Australian businessman

David Stuart Clarke AO (3 January 1942 – 8 April 2011) was an Australian businessman. He attended Knox Grammar School on Sydney's North Shore, the University of Sydney (BEc), and Harvard Business School (MBA).

In 1971, Clarke became joint managing director of Hill Samuel, now Macquarie Group. He was appointed managing director in 1977 and became executive chairman in 1984. Clarke remained Executive Chairman of Macquarie Bank when it changed its name in 1985. He remained in this role until March 2007, when he ceased executive duties. In 2007, he was appointed president of Winemakers' Federation of Australia. Clarke also owned several vineyards in the Hunter Valley of New South Wales and was the chairman of Australian Vintage.
