= Australian knights and dames =

This is an incomplete list of Australians who have been appointed a knight or a dame, being entitled to be known as "sir" or "dame" respectively. It includes living Australian knights and dames as well as dead appointees. The list excludes Australian baronets; they have the title sir, but are not knights per se.

== Criteria ==
For the purposes of this list, an Australian is either:

- an Australian citizen (Australian citizenship did not exist prior to 26 January 1949), or
- a British subject who was born in or whose primary domicile was in Australia (1 January 1901 – 25 January 1949), or in the Australian colonies (26 January 1788 – 31 December 1900).

Hence, the list does not include most knighted British governors-general or colonial or state governors. Their primary domicile was, generally, in the United Kingdom, and they were only temporarily based in Australia. Those who chose to remain in Australia in retirement are listed below.

These appointments were made under:

- the British Imperial honours system. These were recommended by the Australian Government until 1982 and state governments until 1989 (in some cases, recommendations were made by other governments of the Commonwealth of Nations, principally the United Kingdom); and
- the Australian Honours System established in 1975. The categories of Knight and Dame of the Order of Australia were created by the Queen on advice from the Fraser Liberal-National coalition government in 1976, and discontinued by her on advice from the Hawke Labor government in 1986. During that period, twelve Knights and two Dames of the Order of Australia were appointed. On 25 March 2014 Tony Abbott announced the reintroduction of Knights and Dames to the Australian Honours System. Two more Knights and two more Dames were created. On 2 November 2015, they were once again removed from the constitution of the Order of Australia on the advice of Prime Minister Malcolm Turnbull.

Appointments as knight or dame under the orders of foreign countries are not included, with the exception of British Imperial honours awarded to Australians by the UK and PNG Governments after 5 October 1992. Unlike other foreign citizens, citizens of Commonwealth realms appointed knight or dame of a British order are entitled to use the titles "Sir" or "Dame", and use the relevant post nominal. The UK government does not recognize Australian knighthoods as giving entitlement to use these titles in the UK, however.

Many of the people shown had other honours, such as AC, OBE, CMG, VC, etc. These details are not relevant to this list, and are not shown.

Most of the details were sourced from It's an Honour, the Australian Government database of honours and awards. All names of those who were appointed to orders of chivalry (Order of Australia, Order of the British Empire, etc.) that appear in It's an Honour are listed. Not all awards appear in It's an Honour, as awardees may elect not to have their awards included in the database. The list of knights bachelor is also incomplete.

== Order of the Garter ==
Knights Companion of the Order of the Garter:

=== Knights Companion (KG) ===
Name	Born	Awarded	Died	Citation	Reference and comments
Richard Casey	1890	1969	1976	Governor-general of Australia 1965–1969	; also GCMG 1965 and a life peer
Paul Hasluck	1905	1979	1993	Governor-general of Australia 1969–1974	; also GCMG 1969 and GCVO 1970
Ninian Stephen	1923	1994	2017	Governor-general of Australia 1982–1989	; also AK 1982 , GCMG 1982 , GCVO 1982 and KBE 1972

== Order of the Thistle ==
Knights of the Order of the Thistle:

=== Knights (KT) ===
Name	Born	Awarded	Died	Citation	Reference and comments
Robert Menzies	1894	1963	1978	Prime Minister of Australia 1939-41, 1949–66	

- Note: Sir Robert Menzies is the only Australian ever appointed a Knight of the Order of the Thistle (Appointment made for his Scottish ancestry). The award was made in 1963, during his tenure as Prime Minister of Australia. He was also appointed a Knight of the Order of Australia (AK) in 1976.

== Order of the Bath ==
Knights of the Order of the Bath:

=== Knights Grand Cross (GCB) ===
Name	Born	Awarded	Died	Citation	Reference and comments
John Hackett	1910	1967	1997	Australian-born British General	also KCB 1962
William Heseltine	1930	1990	2026	First Australian-born Private Secretary to the Sovereign (1986–1990), last Australian honoured of any Knight Grand Cross grade.	also KCB, KCVO, GCVO
Isaac Isaacs	1855	1937	1948	Governor-general 1931–1936	; also KCMG, GCMG
Wallace Kyle	1910	1966	1988	Governor of Western Australia	also KCB, KCVO
George Reid	1845	1916	1918	Prime Minister 1904–1905	; also KCMG, GCMG

=== Knights Commander (KCB) ===
Name	Born	Awarded	Died	Citation	Reference and comments
Thomas Blamey	1884	1942	1951	Commander-in-Chief of the AMF	; also Knight Bachelor, GBE
William Bridges	1861	1915	1915	Australian Imperial Force	; King George V granted the award on 17 May 1915, and Bridges died on 18 May; however, the award was not formally gazetted until 22 May
Harry Chauvel	1865	1918	1945	AIF – for the capture of Jerusalem	; also KCMG, GCMG
Douglas Evill	1892	1943	1971	Vice-Chief of the Air Staff (RAF)	Also GBE (1946). Australian-born British airman.
John Gellibrand	1872	1919	1945	AIF – France & Flanders	
William Glasgow	1876	1919	1955	AIF – France & Flanders	
John Hackett	1910	1962	1997		Australian-born British soldier; also GCB
William Heseltine	1930	1986	2026	Upgraded Knight Grand Cross of the Order of the Bath (GCB) in 1990.	also GCB, KCVO, GCVO
Talbot Hobbs	1864	1918	1938	Australian Imperial Force	; also KCMG
Neville Howse	1863	1917	1930	AIF – (Surgeon-General AAMC during WW2)	; also KCMG
George Hyde	1877	1934	1937	RAN – Chief of the Naval Staff from 1931 to 1935	
Wallace Kyle	1910	1960	1988		Governor of Western Australia; also GCB, KCVO
John Monash	1865	1918	1931	Australian Imperial Force	; also GCMG
Leslie Morshead	1889	1942	1959	AMF – Commanded at siege of Tobruk	; also KBE
Charles Rosenthal	1875	1919	1954	AIF – France & Flanders	
Brudenell White	1876	1927	1940	Commonwealth Director of 1927 Royal Visit	; also KCMG, KCVO

== Order of Australia ==
Knights and Dames of the Order of Australia:

=== Knights (AK) ===
Name	Born	Awarded	Died	Citation	Reference and comments
Garfield Barwick		1981	1987	In recognition of service to the Australian Parliament, government and the law	; also Knight Bachelor, GCMG
Macfarlane Burnet		1978	1985	For extraordinary and meritorious service to medicine and to science particularly in the fields of microbiology and immunology	; also Knight Bachelor, KBE
Peter Cosgrove		2014	living	Governor-general 2014–2019	Cosgrove was appointed AK upon his appointment as Governor-General
Charles Court		1982	2007	In recognition of service to politics and local government	; also Knight Bachelor, KCMG
Zelman Cowen		1977	2011	–	; Cowen was appointed AK upon his appointment as Governor-General; also Knight Bachelor, GCMG, GCVO
Roden Cutler		1981	2002	In recognition of service to the Crown	; also KCMG, KCVO
Angus Houston		2015	living	For extraordinary and pre-eminent achievement and merit in service to Australia	
Gordon Jackson		1983	1991	For service to industry and to the community	
John Kerr		1976	1991	n/a	; Kerr was the governor-general and, as Principal Knight of the Order of Australia, his AK took effect immediately the category of Knight was established on 24 May 1976; also KCMG, GCMG, GCVO
Robert Menzies		1976	1978	For extraordinary and pre-eminent achievement and merit in the field of government	; also KT
Ninian Stephen		1982	2017	Governor-general 1982–89	; Stephen was appointed AK upon his appointment as governor-general; also KG, GCMG, GCVO, KBE
Colin Syme		1977	1986	For extraordinary and meritorious service to industry, particularly in the fields of research and technology	; also Knight Bachelor

Note: This is a complete list of the Australians who were or are Knights of the Order of Australia. Charles, Prince of Wales, heir to the Australian throne but not himself an Australian, was also appointed AK, by amendment to the Constitution of the Order of Australia in 1981. His father, Prince Philip, Duke of Edinburgh, was also made a Knight of the Order of Australia in 2015.

=== Dames (AD) ===
Name	Born	Awarded	Died	Citation	Reference and comments
Marie Bashir	1930	2014	2026	Governor of New South Wales 2001–2014	
Quentin Bryce	1942	2014	living	Governor-general 2008–2014	
Alexandra Hasluck	1908	1978	1993	For pre-eminent achievement in the fields of literature and history and for extraordinary and meritorious public service to Australia	
Enid Lyons	1897	1980	1981	For public and parliamentary service to Australia over many years	; also GBE

== Order of St Michael and St George ==
Knights of the Order of St Michael and St George:

=== Knights Grand Cross (GCMG) ===
Name	Date	Citation	Reference and comments
Robert Askin	1975	Premier of New South Wales	; also KCMG
Henry Ayers	1894	Premier of South Australia	also KCMG
Edmund Barton	1902	Prime Minister of Australia	
Garfield Barwick	1965	Chief Justice of the High Court	; also Knight Bachelor, AK
David Beattie	1980	Governor-General	also GCVO
Henry Bolte	1972	Premier of Victoria	; also KCMG
Richard Casey	1965	Governor-General-designate	; also KG and a life peer
Harry Chauvel	1919	AIF – for military services in Egypt	; also KCB, KCMG
Bede Clifford	1945	Governor of Trinidad and Tobago	also KCMG, CB and MVO
Joseph Cook	1918	Prime Minister of Australia	
Zelman Cowen	1977	Governor-General of Australia	; also Knight Bachelor, GCVO, AK
Frederick Darley	1901	Chief Justice of New South Wales	; also Knight Bachelor, KCMG
Owen Dixon	1954	Chief Justice of the High Court	; also KCMG
Arthur Fadden	1958	Treasurer and Deputy Prime Minister	; also KCMG
John Forrest	1901	Premier of Western Australia	
Robert Garran	1937	In recognition of service to the Commonwealth	; also Knight Bachelor, KCMG
Harry Gibbs	1981	Chief Justice of the High Court	; also KBE
John Gorton	1977	In recognition of service as Prime Minister of Australia	
Paul Hasluck	1969	Governor-general-designate	; also KG, GCVO
John Higgins	1934	Services to the Commonwealth	; also KCMG
William Irvine	1936	Chief Justice of Victoria	; also KCMG
Isaac Isaacs	1932	Governor-general of Australia	; also KCMG, GCB
John Kerr	1976	(Governor-general of Australia)	; also AK, GCVO, KCMG
John Latham	1935	Attorney-general and minister for external affairs	
John Madden	1906	Chief Justice of the Supreme Court of Victoria	; also Knight Bachelor, KCMG
John McEwen	1971	Services to the Commonwealth	
William McKell	1951	Governor-general of Australia	
William McMahon	1977	Prime Minister of Australia	
James Mitchell	1947	Lieutenant-Governor of Western Australia	; also KCMG
John Monash	1919	AIF – For military services in France & Flanders	; also KCB
Earle Page	1938	Deputy Prime Minister of Australia	
Thomas Playford	1957	Premier of South Australia since 1938	
George Reid	1911	Australian High Commissioner in London	; also KCMG, GCB
Ninian Stephen	1982	Governor-general of Australia	; also AK, KG, GCVO, KBE
Robert Torrens	1884	Premier of South Australia	also KCMG

=== Knights Commander (KCMG) ===
Name	Date	Citation	Reference and comments
James Agnew	1895		
Robert Anderson	1917	AIF – London Administrative Headquarters	
Robert Askin	1972	Premier of New South Wales	; also GCMG
William Aston	1970	Speaker of the House of Representatives	
Henry Ayers	1872		also GCMG
Henry Baker	1961	President of the Tasmanian Legislative Council	
Richard Baker	1895		
Redmond Barry	1877		also Knight Bachelor
Henry Barwell	1922	Premier and Attorney-general of South Australia	
Thomas Bavin	1933	Premier of New South Wales	
Lewis Anthony Beaumont	1901	n/a	
George Bell	1941	Speaker of the House of Representatives	
Thomas Bent	1908	Premier and Treasurer of Victoria	
Graham Berry	1886		
Robert Best	1908	Vice-president of the Executive Committee [sic]	
John George Bice	1923	South Australian Liberal Politician, born in Cornwall in 1853. Positions included chief secretary and acting premier.	
Joh Bjelke-Petersen	1984	Premier of Queensland	
Charles Blackburn	1960	Chancellor of the University of Sydney	; also Knight Bachelor
James Blair	1935	Chief Justice of Queensland	; also Knight Bachelor
Arthur Blyth	1877		
Henry Bolte	1966	Premier of Victoria	; also GCMG
Langdon Bonython	1919	In recognition of service to the Commonwealth	
James Boucaut	1895		
David Brand	1969	Premier of Western Australia	
John Bray	1890		
Stanley Burbury	1981	Governor of Tasmania	; also KBE, KCVO
James Burns	1917	Member of the NSW Legislative Council	
Francis Burt	1977	Chief Justice of Western Australia	
Richard Layton Butler	1939	Premier of South Australia	
Donald Cameron	1932	In recognition of service to public and charitable services in Queensland	
John Carrick	1982	In recognition of service to the Parliament of Australia	
Joseph Carruthers	1908	Premier & Treasurer of New South Wales	
Austin Chapman	1924	Minister of Trade and Customs	
Harry Chauvel	1917	Australian Imperial Force	; also KCB, GCMG
John Cockburn	1900		
Timothy Coghlan	1918	Agent-General for New South Wales in London	; also Knight Bachelor
John Colton	1892		
Pope Cooper	1908	Chief Justice of Queensland	; also Knight Bachelor
Robert Cosgrove	1959	Premier of Tasmania	
Bob Cotton	1978	In recognition of service to public and parliamentary services	
Charles Court	1979	Premier of Western Australia	; also Knight Bachelor, AK
Charles Cowper	1871		
William Rooke Creswell	1911	Director of Commonwealth Naval Forces	(appears as Cresswell); also KBE
Robert Crichton-Brown	1980	Commerce and the Commonwealth	(also Knight Bachelor) (appears as Chrichton-Brown)
William Portus Cullen	1912	Chief Justice of the NSW Supreme Court	; also Knight Bachelor
Roden Cutler	1965	Governor-designate of New South Wales	; also AK, KCVO
Frederick Darley	1897		also Knight Bachelor, GCMG
John George Davies	1909	Speaker of the Tasmanian House of Assembly	
John Mark Davies	1918	President of the Victorian Legislative Council	
James Dickson	1901	Chief secretary of Queensland	; died ten days after being knighted
Owen Dixon	1941	Judge of the High Court	; also GCMG
John Dodds	1901	n/a	; also Knight Bachelor
John Downer	1887		
Frank Gavan Duffy	1929	Judge of the High Court	
James Duhig	1959	In recognition of service as the Roman Catholic archbishop of Queensland	
Thomas Peel Dunhill	1933	n/a	
Albert Dunstan	1948	Former premier of Victoria and minister of health	
John Dwyer	1949	Chief Justice of Western Australia	; also Knight Bachelor
Hughie Edwards	1974	Governor of Western Australia	
Thomas Ewing	1908	In recognition of service as Minister of Defence	
Arthur Fadden	1951	Deputy Prime Minister and Treasurer	; also GCMG
George Fuller	1919	Colonial Secretary of New South Wales	
Robert Garran	1920	Solicitor-General of the Commonwealth	; also Knight Bachelor, GCMG
Guy Gaunt	1918	n/a	; lived in the UK
Alexander Charles Gregory	1903	Surveyor-General of Queensland	
Littleton Groom	1924	Attorney-general of the Commonwealth	
Henry Gullett	1933	Minister of Trade & Customs	
John Winthrop Hackett, senior	1913	Member of the WA House of Assembly	; also Knight Bachelor. His son John Winthrop Hackett, junior was also knighted, but by the British government – see "Non-Australian knights and dames with significant Australian associations" below
Rupert Hamer	1982	Public & political services in Victoria	
Colin Hannah	1972	Governor of Queensland	; also KBE, KCVO
Eric Harrison	1962	Australian High Commissioner in London	; also KCVO
James Harrison	1968	Governor of South Australia	
Edmund Herring	1949	In recognition for service as Lieutenant-Governor of Victoria	(appears as Edward Herring); also KBE
John Higgins	1918	Services to the Commonwealth	; also GCMG
John Hoad	1911	Chief of the General Staff – AMF	
Talbot Hobbs	1919	For military services in France & Flanders	; also KCB
Frederick Holder	1902	Speaker of the House of Representatives	
Neville Howse	1919	Australian Imperial Force	; also KCB
William Irvine	1914	Attorney-general of the Commonwealth	; also GCMG
Isaac Isaacs	1928	Senior Puisne Judge of the High Court	; also GCMG, GCB
Lawrence Jackson	1970	Chief Justice of Western Australia	; also Knight Bachelor
Walter James	1931	Chancellor of the University of Western Australia	; also Knight Bachelor
Elliot Johnson	1920	Speaker of the House of Representatives	
Frederick Jordan	1936	Chief Justice of New South Wales	
John Kerr	1974	Chief Justice of New South Wales	; also AK, GCMG, GCVO
James Killen	1982	Services to the Parliament of Australia	
John Kirwan	1947	President of the WA Legislative Council	; also Knight Bachelor
Adrian Knox	1921	Chief Justice of the High Court	
Condor Laucke	1979	Services to the Parliament of Australia	
John Lavarack	1955	Governor of Queensland	; also KBE, KCVO
Harry Lawson	1933	Former premier of Victoria	
Walter Lee	1922	Premier & Chief Secretary of Tasmania	; also Knight Bachelor
James George Lee Steere	1900		
Henry Lefroy	1919	Premier of Western Australia	
Elliott Lewis	1902	Premier of Tasmania	
James John Lowe	1956	Senior Judge of the Victorian Supreme Court	
Phillip Lynch	1981	Services to the Parliament of Australia	
Mungo MacCallum	1926	Vice-Chancellor of the University of Sydney	
Alexander MacCormick	1926	A leading surgeon	; also Knight Bachelor
Charles Mackellar	1916	President – NSW State Children's Relief Board	; also Knight Bachelor
George Macleay	1875	Explorer and politician	
John Madden	1899		also Knight Bachelor, GCMG
Frederick Mann	1937	Chief Justice of Victoria	; also Knight Bachelor
Alan Mansfield	1958	Chief Justice of Queensland	; also KCVO
David Martin	1993	Governor of New South Wales (Late gazettal)	
John Mason	1980		Mason was a British diplomat who was made a KCMG prior to his final posting as High Commissioner to Australia. On retirement, he and his wife chose to remain in Australia, and became Australian citizens.
Walter Massy-Greene	1933	Assistant Commonwealth Treasurer	(appears as Green, Walter Massy)
Henry Carr Maudsley	1919	Australian Imperial Force	
Philip McBride	1953	Minister of Defence	
John McCall	1919	Agent-General for Tasmania in London	; also Knight Bachelor
James McCay	1918	Australian Imperial Force	; also KBE
John McLeay	1962	Speaker of the House of Representatives	
Ian McLennan	1979	Services to youth, the community and industry	; also KBE
Robert McMillan	1925	Chief Justice of the WA Supreme Court	; also Knight Bachelor
William McMillan	1901	Colonial Treasurer of New South Wales	
Alister McMullin	1957	President of the Commonwealth Senate	
John McPhee	1934	Premier & Treasurer of Tasmania	
Denison Miller	1920	Governor of the Commonwealth Bank	
Edward Fancourt Mitchell	1918	Services to the Commonwealth	
James Mitchell	1921	Premier & Treasurer of Western Australia	; also GCMG
William Mitchell	1927	Vice-Chancellor of the University of Adelaide	
Newton Moore	1910	Premier & Treasurer of Western Australia	
John Morris	1952	Chief Justice of Tasmania	; also Knight Bachelor
Baron Ferdinand von Mueller	1879	Director of the Royal Botanic Gardens Melbourne	
Walter Murdoch	1964	Services to education & literature	
Brian Murray	1982	Governor of South Australia [sic]	(Note: Murray was in fact Governor of Victoria)
George Murray	1917	Chief Justice of the Supreme Court of SA	
Hubert Murray	1925	Lieutenant-Governor of the Territory of Papua	
Mellis Napier	1945	Chief Justice of South Australia	; also Knight Bachelor
John Newlands	1927	President of the Commonwealth Senate	
Herbert Nicholls	1927	Chief Justice of the Supreme Court of Tasmania	; also Knight Bachelor
Francis Nicklin	1968	Premier of Queensland	
John Northcott	1954	Governor of New South Wales – formerly CGS	; also KCVO
John Northmore	1932	Chief Justice of Western Australia	
Stephen Parker	1914	Chief Justice of Western Australia	; also Knight Bachelor
Archdale Parkhill	1936	Minister of Defence	
Alexander Peacock	1902	Lately Prime Minister [sic] of Victoria	
John Beverley Peden	1930	President of the NSW Legislative Council	
Samuel Pethebridge	1917	Australian Imperial Force	
Robert Philp	1915	Premier of Queensland	
Charles Powers	1929	Judge of the High Court of Australia	
James Ramsay	1978	Governor of Queensland	; also Knight Bachelor, KCVO
Claude Hill Reading	1934	Chairman – Board of the Commonwealth Bank	
George Reid	1909	Member of the House of Representatives	(appears as Reif [sic], George Houstoun); also GCMG, GCB
George Rich	1932	Senior Puisne Judge of the High Court	
George Ritchie	1935	Minister of Mines of South Australia	
David Rivett	1935	Deputy Chairman & Chief Executive of the CSIRO	
Arthur Robinson	1923	Chief secretary & Minister of Marine of SA	
Thomas Robinson	1913	Agent-General for Queensland in London	; also Knight Bachelor, KBE, GBE
Granville Ryrie	1919	For military services in Egypt	
Frederick Sargood	1890		
John See	1902	Lately Prime Minister [sic] of New South Wales	
Frederick Shedden	1943	Secretary of the Department of Defence	
Edwin Thomas Smith	1888	Vice-president of the organising committee for the Jubilee International Exhibition of 1887-88	
Billy Snedden	1978	For public & parliamentary service	
Walter Baldwin Spencer	1916	Professor of Biology at Melbourne University	
Bill Spooner	1963	Leader of the Government in the Senate	
Hayden Starke	1939	Puisne Judge of the High Court	
Bertram Stevens	1941	Premier of New South Wales	
Lancelot Stirling	1909	President of the SA Legislative Council	; also Knight Bachelor
Edward Albert Stone	1912	Lieutenant Governor of Western Australia	; also Knight Bachelor
Kenneth Street	1956	Chief Justice of New South Wales	
Laurence Street	1976	n/a	
Philip Street	1928	Chief Justice of New South Wales	
Josiah Symon	1901	Former attorney-general of South Australia	
Charles Wade	1920	Attorney-general of New South Wales	; also Knight Bachelor
Edward Emerton Warren	1969	Services to international relations & coal mining	; also KBE
Brudenell White	1919	For military services in France & Flanders	; also KCB, KCVO
Edward Williams	1983	For services to the XII Commonwealth Games	; also KBE
William Williams	1916	Operations in the field with the AMF	
Henry Winneke	1966	Chief Justice of the Victorian Supreme Court	; also Knight Bachelor, KCVO
Edward Wittenoom	1900	Agent-General for Western Australia in London	
Albert Wolff	1959	Chief Justice of Western Australia	
Harry Wollaston	1912	Comptroller-General of the Customs Department	
Eric Woodward	1958	For services to the Commonwealth	; also KCVO
Harold Young	1983	For services to the Parliament of Australia	
John Young	1975	Lieutenant-Governor of Victoria	
William Zeal	1895		

== Royal Victorian Order ==
Knights of the Royal Victorian Order:

=== Knights Grand Cross (GCVO) ===
Name	Living	Date	Citation	Reference and comments
David Beattie		1980	Governor-General of New Zealand 1980–1985	; also GCMG
Zelman Cowen		1980	Governor-General 1977–1982	; also Knight Bachelor, GCMG, AK
Paul Hasluck		1970	Governor-general 1969–1974	' also KG, GCMG
William Heseltine		1990	Private Secretary to HM The Queen 1986–1990	; also GCB.
John Kerr		1977	Governor-general 1974–1977	; also AK, KCMG, GCMG
Ninian Stephen		1982	Governor-general 1982–1989	; also AK, KG, GCMG, KBE

=== Knights Commander (KCVO) ===
Name	Living	Date	Citation	Reference and comments
Frank Berryman		1954	Director-general of the 1954 Royal Tour	
Leighton Bracegirdle		1947	Official Secretary – Duke Of Gloucester, Military and Official Secretary, Government House Canberra 1931–45	
Denis Browne		1961	Surgeon	
Stanley Burbury		1977	Governor of Tasmania during the 1977 Royal Visit	; also KCMG, KBE
Roden Cutler		1970	Governor of New South Wales 1966–81	; also AK, KCMG
Roy Dowling		1963	Australian Secretary to the Queen – 1963 Royal Visit	; also KBE
Colin Hannah		1977	Governor of Queensland 1972–77	; also KBE, KCMG
Eric Harrison		1954	Minister in Attendance during the 1954 Royal Visit	; also KCMG
William Heseltine		1982		; also GCVO, KCB, GCB
Robert Jackson		1962		also Knight Bachelor
Wallace Kyle		1977	Governor of Western Australia	also GCB, KCB
Walter Lamb		1943	Secretary of the Royal Academy	
John Lavarack		1954	Governor of Queensland 1946–57	; also KBE, KCMG
Bertram Mackennal		1921		
Alan Mansfield		1970	Governor of Queensland 1966–72	; also KCMG
Douglas Nicholls		1977	Governor of South Australia 1976–77	; also Knight Bachelor
John Northcott		1954	Governor of New South Wales 1946–57	; also KCMG
George Pearce		1927	Acting prime minister 1916	
Reginald Pollard		1970	Australian Secretary to Queen −1970 Royal Visit	; also KBE
James Ramsay		1982	Governor of Queensland 1974–77	; also Knight Bachelor, KCMG
James Scholtens		1977	Commonwealth Director in charge of 1977 Royal Visit	
Keith Seaman		1981	Governor of South Australia 1977–82	
David Smith		1990	Official secretary to the governor-general 1973–1990	
Percy Spender		1957	Commonwealth Minister	; also KBE
Murray Tyrrell		1968	Official Secretary to the governor-general 1947–74	
Brudenell White		1920	Chief of General Staff during the 1920 Prince of Wales Tour – Died in Fairbairn Air Disaster 1940	; also KCB, KCMG
Henry Winneke		1977	Governor of Victoria 1974–82	; also Knight Bachelor, KCMG
Eric Woodward		1963	Governor of New South Wales 1957–65	; also KCMG
John Yocklunn		1977	Director of the 1977 Royal Visit to PNG	; also Knight Bachelor

== Order of the British Empire ==
Knights and Dames of the Order of the British Empire:

=== Knights Grand Cross (GBE) ===
Name	Date	Citation	Reference and comments
Thomas Blamey	1943	C-in-C AMF & Cdr Allied Land Forces in SW Pacific	; also Knight Bachelor, KCB
Owen Cox	1920	Service in connection with the war	; also KBE
Douglas Evill	1946	Air Chief Marshal, Royal Air Force	Also KCB
Robert Gibson	1932	Chairman of the Commonwealth Bank	; also KBE
Thomas Robinson	1920	Agent-General for Queensland & services to AIF	; also Knight Bachelor, KCMG, KBE

=== Dames Grand Cross (GBE) ===
Name	Date	Citation	Reference and comments
Mary Hughes	1922	Services to Australia during the war	
Enid Lyons	1957	Public services to Australia	; also AD
Nellie Melba	1927	Services to Australia	; also DBE
Pattie Menzies	1954	Public services to Australia	
Flora Reid	1917	Services to Australia during the war	

=== Knights Commander (KBE) ===
Name	Living	Date	Citation	Reference and comments
Charles Adermann		1971	Political & public service	
Keith Aickin		1976	In recognition of service to the law	
John Allison		1959	Chairman of the Export Development Council	
William John Allison		1954	n/a	; also Knight Bachelor
Ken Anderson		1972	In recognition of service to the public service and politics	; also Knight Bachelor
Reg Ansett		1969	In recognition of service to the transport industry	
Stanley Argyle		1930	Minister of Health in Victoria	
Albert Edwin Axon		1959	Chancellor of the University of Queensland	
Clive Baillieu		1938	In recognition of service to the Public service	; later 1st Baron Baillieu
James William Barrett		1918	Service in Egypt with the Red Cross	
Walter Bassett		1959	Public service & engineering	
Robert Bates	living	2026	For services to Business and to the Community	Awarded on the recommendation of the Papua New Guinea government
Philip Baxter		1965	Chairman of the Atomic Energy Commission	
Howard Beale		1961	Australian ambassador to the USA	
George Beeby		1939	Chief Justice of the Arbitration Court	
Brian Ernest Bell		1994	Services to business and the community	Awarded on the recommendation of the Papua New Guinea government
Phillip Bennett		1983	Chief of the General Staff	
Nigel Bowen		1976	In recognition of service to political services	
Richard Boyer		1956	Chairman of the ABC	
Henry Braddon		1920	Commonwealth Commissioner in the USA	
Gerard Brennan		1981	Judge of the High Court of Australia	,
William Bridgeford		1956	Chief executive of the Olympic Games	
Charles Hart Bright		1980	In recognition of service to public service	
George Brookman		1920	Services during the war	
Michael Bruxner		1962	In recognition of service to public and political services	
John Bunting		1977	Australian High Commissioner in London	; also Knight Bachelor
Stanley Burbury		1958	Chief Justice of Tasmania	; also KCMG, KCVO
Joseph Terence Anthony Burke		1980	In recognition of service to the arts	
Macfarlane Burnet		1969	President of the Australian Academy of Science	; also Knight Bachelor, AK
Henry Mackay Burrell		1960	Honours List	
Samuel (Roy) Burston		1952	Honours List	
Gordon Chalk		1971	Queensland Government Minister	
Gilbert Chandler		1972	Leader of the Legislative Council of Victoria	
Frederick Chaney (senior)		1982	In recognition of service to the community	
John Clancy		1967	Chancellor of the University of Sydney	
Harold Clapp		1941	In recognition of service to public service	
Lindesay Clark		1968	In recognition of services to the mining industry	
Reginald Marcus Clark		1939	In recognition of service to public services	
Francis Grenville Clarke		1926	President of the Legislative Council of Victoria	
William Clarkson		1918	Reorganisation of coastal shipping during the war	Appears twice: ,. Also CMG, Bio
Charles Percy Barlee Clubbe		1927	Service to the Commonwealth	
Arthur Cocks		1923	Colonial Treasurer of New South Wales	
John Collins		1951	n/a	
Charles Wellington Connibere		1936	In recognition of service to charities	
Virgil Copas		1982	Archbishop Emeritus of Papua New Guinea	
Douglas Copland		1950	Prices Commissioner & Vice-Chancellor of the ANU	
Magnus Cormack		1970	In recognition of service to political and public service	
Owen Cox		1918	Chairman of the Overseas Shipping Committee	; also GBE
John Gregory Crace		1947		
William Rooke Creswell		1919	1st Naval Member of the Naval Board	(shown as Cresswell); also KCMG
Walter Crocker		1978	In recognition of service to the public	
Charles Cutler		1973	Deputy Premier of New South Wales	
Edgeworth David		1920	Services during the war	
Alfred Charles Davidson		1938	General manager of the Bank of New South Wales	
Charles Davidson		1964	Public services	
Daryl Dawson	living	1982	Judge of the High Court of Australia	
William Deane	living	1982	Judge of the High Court of Australia	
Hugh Denison		1923	Service to the Commonwealth	
David Derham		1977	Vice-Chancellor of the University of Melbourne	
Roy Dowling		1957	Honours List	; also KCVO
Alexander (Alick) Downer		1965	High Commissioner to the United Kingdom	, (appears as 2 separate entries in It's an Honour)
Russell Dumas		1964	In recognition of service to the Public Service in Western Australia	; also Knight Bachelor
John Wallace Dunlop		1971	In recognition of service to industry	
Donald Dunstan		1980	Chief of the General Staff	
Clifden Henry Andrews Eager		1952	President of the Legislative Council of Victoria	; also Knight Bachelor
James Alexander Mackenzie Elder		1925	Commonwealth Commissioner in the USA	
Kevin Ellis		1969	In recognition of service as Speaker of the NSW Legislative Assembly	
David Fairbairn		1978	In recognition of service to Parliament	
Allen Fairhall		1970	Minister of Defence	
Andrew Walker Fairley		1951	In recognition of service to the Public Service in Victoria	
Neil Fairley		1950	In recognition of service to tropical medicine	
James Oswald Fairfax		1926	In recognition of service as Chairman of the Empire Press Union	
James Freeman		1977	Roman Catholic archbishop of Sydney	
Gordon Freeth		1978	High Commissioner in London	
John Russell French		1918	General manager of the Bank of New South Wales	
Wilfred Fullagar		1955	Judge of the High Court	
Hudson Fysh		1953	Chairman of QANTAS	
Victor Garland		1982	In recognition of service to parliament	
Ragnar Garrett		1959	Chief of the General Staff	
Harry Gibbs		1970	In recognition of service to the law	; also GCMG
Robert Gibson		1920	Services to the Repatriation Office	; also GBE
Norman Gilroy		1969	In recognition for service as Roman Catholic archbishop of Sydney	
Philip Goldfinch		1934	Chairman of the British Settlers Committee	
Launcelot Goody		1977	In recognition of service to the Roman Catholic Church, particularly as the archbishop of Perth	
Eugene Gorman		1966	Services to the dried fruits industry	
Guy Green		1982	Chief Justice of Tasmania	
Richard Kenneth Green		1957	Senior Puisne Judge – Supreme Court of Tasmania	
John Grindrod		1983	Services to religion	
William Archer Gunn		1961	Chairman of the Australian Wool Bureau	
William Henry Hall		1979	Service to veterans	; also Knight Bachelor
Reginald Halse		1962	Archbishop of Brisbane	
Keith Hancock		1965	Professor of History at the ANU	
Val Hancock		1962	Honours List	
Mostyn Hanger		1973	Chief Justice of Queensland	
Colin Hannah		1971	Chief of the Air Staff	; also KCMG, KCVO
Wilfred Hastings Harrington		1963	Honours List	
John Richards Harris		1937	Minister of Health in Victoria	
John Harrison		1923	Chairman of the Disabled Soldiers Village	
Frank Hassett		1976	Chief of the Defence Force Staff	
Thomas Henley		1920	Member of the NSW Legislative Council	
Denham Henty		1968	In recognition of service to political services in Tasmania	
Edmund Herring		1943	For outstanding qualities of leadership in the S.W. Pacific area	; also KCMG
Leslie Herron		1966	For service as Chief Justice of New South Wales	
Thomas Hiley		1966	Lately Deputy Premier of Queensland	
William Frederick Holland		1961	President of the RSSAIL	
Ivan Holyman		1956	Service to the transport industry	
Samuel Hordern		1938	President of the NSW Royal Agricultural Society	; also Knight Bachelor
Henry Rudolph Howard		1963	Chairman of the Commonwealth Games Committee	; also Knight Bachelor
Herbert Sydney Hudd		1937	Minister of Railways & Marine in South Australia	
William Hudson		1955	Chairman of the Snowy Mountains Authority	
Alan Hulme		1971	Postmaster-General	
Thomas Ernest Victor Hurley		1950	Public services	
Leonard Huxley		1964	Vice-Chancellor of the ANU	
Kenneth Jacobs		1976	Service to law	
George Jenkins		1946	Minister of Agriculture in South Australia	
Asher Joel		1974	Services to the Community	; also Knight Bachelor
George Jones		1953	Honours List	
William Raymond Kelly		1952	Chief Justice of the Arbitration Court	
Alfred Newcombe Kemsley		1980	Shrine of Remembrance in Melbourne	
Wilfrid Kent Hughes		1957	Chairman of the Olympic Games Committee	
William John Kilpatrick		1965	Public service	
Frank Kitto		1955	Judge of the High Court	
Harold Knight		1980	Services to banking	
John Lavarack		1942	Operations in the Middle East	; also KCMG, KCVO
Arthur James Lee		1966	President of the RSSAIL	
Ernest Henry Lee-Steere		1988	Lord Mayor of Perth	
Frank Little		1977	Roman Catholic archbishop of Melbourne	
Marcus Loane		1976	Archbishop of Sydney	
Arthur MacDonald		1978	Chief of the Defence Force Staff	
William George Albert Mack		1967	Chief Justice of Queensland	
Iven Mackay		1941	Operations in the Middle East	
Thomas Chester Manifold		1965	Services to horse racing and Victoria community	; also Knight Bachelor
Henry Edward Manning		1939	Attorney-general of New South Wales	
Anthony Mason		1972	Services to law	
David Masson		1923	Professor of Chemistry at Melbourne University	
Louis Matheson		1976	Services to education and to Victoria	
William George McBeath		1920	Service during the War	
John McCauley		1955	Honours List	
James McCay		1919	Service during the war	; also KCMG
Emmet McDermott		1972	Lord Mayor of Sydney	
Charles George McDonald		1970	Chancellor of the University of Sydney	; also Knight Bachelor
William D'Arcy McDonald		1964	Chairman of the Commonwealth Bank	
Lyell McEwin		1954	Minister of Health & Mines in South Australia	
James Robert McGregor		1956	Services to the wool industry	
Malcolm McIntosh		1956	Minister of Works in South Australia	
Alick Benson McKay		1977	Services to Victoria & to newspapers	
Ross McLarty		1953	Premier of Western Australia	
Ian McLennan		1963	Services to industry	; also KCMG
Neville McNamara		1981	Honours List	
Alan McNicoll		1966	Honours List	
Walter McNicoll		1937	Administrator of New Guinea	
William McPherson		1923	Treasurer of Victoria	
Edward McTiernan		1951	Judge of the High Court	
Alfred William Meeks		1920	Member of the NSW Legislative Council	
Leslie Melville		1957	Vice-Chancellor of the ANU	
Douglas Menzies		1958	Judge of the High Court	
Harrison Moore		1925	Professor of Law at Melbourne University	
Kenneth Morris		1968	Services to parliament & the community	
Leslie Morshead		1942	Distinguished service in the Middle East	; also KCB
Alan Whiteside Munro		1965	Minister of Industrial Development in Queensland	
Alister Murdoch		1966	Honours List	
James Anderson Murdoch		1928	Public & charitable services	
Rupert Myers		1981	Services to education & science	
Maurice Arnold Nathan		1963	Lord Mayor of Melbourne	
Frank Kingsley Norris		1957	Services to medicine	
James O'Collins		1980	Services to religion & the community	
Mark Oliphant		1959	Director of the School of Science at the ANU	
Neil O'Sullivan		1959	Attorney-general of the Commonwealth	
Frank Packer		1971	Services to Australian & International Yachting	; also Knight Bachelor
Shane Paltridge		1966	Leader of the Government in the Senate	; appointed KBE 1 January 1966, and died 21 January
Herbert Angas Parsons		1945	Senior Puisne Judge in Queensland	(shown as Herbert Angis Parsons); also Knight Bachelor
Baden Pattinson		1962	Minister of Education in South Australia	
Richard Peek		1972	Chief of the Naval Staff	
Frederick Beaumont Phillips		1956	Chief Justice of Papua New Guinea	
John Phillips		1972	Services to banking	
Roslyn Philp		1958	Senior Puisne Judge in Queensland	
Reginald Pollard		1961	Honours List	; also KCVO
Charles Read		1976	Chief of the Air Staff	
Arthur Rickard		1920	Services during the War	
Horace Robertson		1950	Honours List	
Macpherson Robertson		1935	Philanthropic services in Victoria	; also Knight Bachelor
Thomas Robinson		1917	Agent-General for Queensland in London	; also Knight Bachelor, KCMG, GBE
Percival Halse Rogers		1939	Judge of the Supreme Court of New South Wales	
Robert Bell Roscoe		1981	Public services	
John Rossiter		1978	Agent-General for Victoria in London	
Sydney Rowell		1953	Chief of the General Staff	
James Rowland		1977	Chief of the Air Staff	
Charles Ryan		1919	Service during the war	
Arthur Rylah		1968	Deputy Premier of Victoria	
John Sanderson		1937	Services to the Commonwealth	
Bruce Saunders	living	2012	For service to business and public and community development	Awarded on the recommendation of the Solomon Islands government
Stanley Savige		1950	Honours List	
Frederick Scherger		1958	Honours List	
Francis Palmer Selleck		1957	Lord Mayor of Melbourne	; also Knight Bachelor
Joseph Aloysius Sheehy		1970	Senior Puisne Judge in Queensland	
Mark Sheldon		1924	Services to the Commonwealth	; also Knight Bachelor
Colin Sinclair		1953	Service to the public & the pastoral industry	
Joynton Smith		1920	Services during the war	
Keith Smith		1919	England-Australia flight	
Ross Smith		1919	England-Australia flight	
Victor Smith		1969	Chief of the Naval Staff	
Sydney Snow		1936	Public services	
Percy Spender		1952	Australian Ambassador to the USA	; also KCVO
Richard Hawdon Stawell		1929	President of the Melbourne Hospital	
Clive Selwyn Steele		1953	Services to engineering	
Ninian Stephen		1972	Justice of the High Court of Australia	also AK, KG, GCMG, GCVO
Jack Stevens		1955	Chairman of the Atomic Energy Commission	
Hugh David Stevenson		1977	Chief of the Naval Staff	
George Steward		1918	Service to the Commonwealth Government	
Hector Hamilton Stewart		1976	Service to medicine & the community	
Phillip Nigel Warrington Strong		1970	Primate of Australia	
Vernon Sturdee		1951	Honours List	
Reginald Swartz		1972	Minister for National Development	
Geoffrey Syme		1941	Service to journalism	
George Syme		1924	Service to Victoria	
Anthony Synnot		1979	Chief of the Naval Staff	
Alan Taylor		1955	Judge of the High Court	
Vernon Haddon Treatt		1970	Chief Commissioner for Sydney	
Donald Trescowthick		1979	Services to the community	
John Evenden Virtue		1975	Senior Puisne Judge in Western Australia	
Charles Graham Waddell		1927	Service to the Commonwealth	
Geoffrey Archer Walch		1954	Public service in Tasmania	
Cyril Walsh		1969	Judge of the High Court	
Arthur George Warner		1962	Minister of Transport in Victoria	; also Knight Bachelor
Edward Emerton Warren		1959	Services to the coal industry	; also KCMG
William Webb		1954	Judge of the High Court	
Henry Wells		1956	Chief of the General Staff	
Frederick William George White		1962	Chairman of the CSIRO	
Thomas White		1952	Australian High Commissioner to the United Kingdom	
Bruce Williams		1980	Services to education and to government	
Dudley Williams		1954	Judge of the High Court	
Edward Williams		1981	Services to law & the community	; also KCMG
Richard Williams		1954	Director-general of Civil Aviation since 1946	
Eric Willis		1975	Deputy Premier of New South Wales	
James Willis		1981	Chief of the Naval Staff	
Kenneth Agnew Wills		1960	Member of the Universities Commission	
Ronald Wilson		1979	Judge of the High Court	
Victor Wilson		1926	Services to the Empire Exhibition	
John Wilton		1964	Chief of the General Staff	
Victor Windeyer		1958	Judge of the High Court	
Frank Woods		1972	Primate of Australia	
George Wootten		1958	Chairman of the Repatriation Commission	
Guilford Young		1978	Services to the church	
Walter Young		1932	Chairman of the SA Committee on Finance	

=== Dames Commander (DBE) ===
Name	Living	Date	Citation	Reference and comments
Edith Teschemaker Anderson		1937	Public service in New South Wales	
Judith Anderson		1960	In recognition of service to the performing arts	
Jacobena Angliss		1975	Community and welfare services	
Mary V. Austin		1979	In recognition of service to community and welfare services	
Zara Bate		1968	Devotion to the public interest	; she was initially known as Dame Zara Holt (being the widow of Harold Holt), but later married Jeff Bate
Beryl Beaurepaire		1981	In recognition of service to women's affairs	
Alice Berry		1960	In recognition of service to country women	
Margaret Blackwood		1981	In recognition of service to the [sic] education	
Helen Blaxland		1975	In recognition of service to the community	
Jill Bolte		1973	Public service to Victoria	
Sister Philippa Brazill		1979	In recognition of service to the community	
Marie Breen		1979	In recognition of service to the community	
Mabel Brookes		1955	In recognition of service to charitable and social welfare services	
Edith Burnside		1976	In recognition of service to hospitals and the community	
Nancy Buttfield		1972	In recognition of service to political and public services	
Rita Mary Buxton		1969	In recognition of service to charities	
Carmen Callil		2017	Publishing	
Kate Isabel Campbell		1971	In recognition of service to the welfare of Australian children	
Florence Cardell-Oliver		1951	WA Minister of Health (Mrs Cardell-Oliver)	(as Annie Florence Gillies)
Alice Chisholm		1920	Organisation of canteens for the troops	
Rachel Cleland		1980	n/a	
Mabel Irene Coles		1971	In recognition of service to charities	
Mary Cook		1925		
Gertrude Cosgrove		1947	In recognition of service to the Public service in Tasmania	
Elizabeth Couchman		1961	In recognition of service to public and patriotic services	
Mary Cramer		1971	In recognition of service to the public	
Mary Daly		1951	In recognition of service to social welfare	
Constance Elizabeth D'Arcy		1935	In recognition of service to the welfare of children	
Florence Bligh, Countess of Darnley		1919	n/a	
Joyce Daws		1975	In recognition of service to medicine	
Mary Durack		1978	In recognition of service to literature	
Doris Fitton		1982	In recognition of service to the theatre	
Phyllis Frost		1974	In recognition of service to the community	
Monica Gallagher		1976	In recognition of service to the community	
Mary Gilmore		1937	In recognition for leading women in 'New Australian Movement' and as a writer of verse, stories and essays	
Margaret Guilfoyle		1980	Public & Parliamentary service	
Joan Hammond		1974	Distinguished services to music	
Mary Herring		1960	In recognition of service to nursing in Victoria	
Patricia Hewitt	living	2025	For services to Healthcare Transformation	Awarded as part of the 2025 New Year Honours
Carol Kidu	living	2005		Papua New Guinean 2005 New Year's Honours
Leonie Kramer		1983	Services to literature and the public	
Ruby Litchfield		1981	Service to the performing arts & the community	
Annie McEwen		1966	Public services	
Patricia Mackinnon		1977	Distinguished service to Royal Children's Hospital	
Ella Macknight		1969	Services to medicine	
Jean Macnamara		1935	In recognition of service to the welfare of children	
Ida Mann		1980	Services to the welfare of Aboriginals	
Nellie Melba		1918	Patriotic work during the war	; also GBE
Roma Mitchell		1982	Community services	
Elisabeth Murdoch		1963	Social welfare services	
Merlyn Myer		1960	Charitable services	
Olivia Newton-John		2020		
Ada Norris		1976	Distinguished community service	
Marjorie Parker		1977	Distinguished community service	
Annabelle Rankin		1957	Political and public services	
Audrey Reader		1978	Service to women's affairs and politics	
Joan Howard Roberts		1978	Services to the handicapped	
Raigh Roe		1980	Services to women	
Margaret Scott		1981	Services to ballet (Mrs Denton)	
Hilda Stevenson		1968	Social welfare services	
Joan Sutherland		1979	In recognition of service to the performing arts	
Dorothy Tangney		1968	Service to the Western Australia [sic] Parliament	; the reference to the "Western Australia [sic] Parliament" is an error, as Tangney was never a member of that parliament
Peggy van Praagh		1970	Services to ballet	
Eadith Walker		1928	Philanthropic & charitable services	
Ivy Wedgwood		1967	Services to Parliament	

== Knights Bachelor ==
This list of Australian knights bachelor is incomplete. You can assist by adding to it.

Note: There are no postnominal letters associated with the award of Knight Bachelor.

Name	Living	Date	Citation	Reference and comments
Daniel Aarons		1970	In recognition for services as Treasurer of the Liberal Party of NSW	
Tei Abal		1976		
Albert Francis Abbott		1981	Services to local government	
Charles Abbott		1960	Judge of the Supreme Court of South Australia	
Thomas à Beckett		1909	Puisne Judge of the Supreme Court of Victoria	
Peter Abeles		1972	Services to transport & Melbourne University	
Alastair Duncan Grant Adam		1970	Judge of the Supreme Court of Victoria	
Kenneth Thomas Adamson		1968	Services to the dental profession	
Garrick Agnew		1982	Service to industry & commerce	
Alexis Albert		1972	In recognition of service to industry & the community	
Henry Graham Alderman		1962	In recognition of services to the legal profession	
George Mason Allard		1926	In recognition of services to banking	
Gordon Laidlaw Allard		1981	In recognition of services to the Royal Victoria Eye & Ear Hospital	
Carleton Allen		1952		
Harry Brookes Allen		1914	Dean of Medicine at the University of Melbourne	
William Guildford Allen (senior)		1973	Services to the pastoral industry in Queensland	
William Guildford Allen (junior)		1981	In recognition of service to broadcasting & the pastoral industry	
William John Allison		1954	In recognition of service to Australian commerce	; also KBE
Arthur Barton Pilgrim Amies		1957	In recognition of service to the dentistry as Dean at the University of Melbourne	
Donald Anderson		1967	Director-general of the Civil Aviation Department	
Francis Anderson		1936	Services to the University of Sydney	
John Muir Anderson		1969	In recognition of service to the community	
Ken Anderson		1970	Minister for Supply	; also KBE
William Hewson Anderson		1965	In recognition of service to the Public service	
Dormer Andrews		1987	In recognition of service as Chief Justice of Queensland	
Keith Angas		1952	Service to the pastoral industry	
William Angliss		1939	In recognition of service to the public service in Victoria	
Tristan Antico		1973	In recognition of service to industry	
Archibald Archer		1981	In recognition of service to the primary industry, government and to the community	
Alfred Norman Armstrong		1966	In recognition of service to banking & export	
Alfred Henry Ashbolt		1925	Agent-General for Tasmania in London	
Will Ashton		1960	Service as Chairman of the Commonwealth Art Advisory Board	
Harold George Aston		1983	Services to industry	
John Atwill		1979	In recognition of service to commerce	
John Worroker Austin		1971	In recognition of service to industry	
James Frederick John Auswild		1974	In recognition of service to commerce	
Kenneth Bailey		1958	Commonwealth Solicitor-General	
James Balderstone		1983	In recognition of service to primary industry and commerce	
John Vincent Barry		1961		
Redmond Barry		1877		also KCMG
Peter Barter				
Garfield Barwick		1953	In recognition of service to the Public service	; also AK, GCMG
Noel Bayliss		1979	In recognition of service to education at Murdoch University	; also CBE
Frank Beaurepaire		1942	Lord Mayor of Melbourne	
George Bedbrook		1978	In recognition of paraplegic rehabilitation	; also OBE
Marcus Beeck		1979	Service to agriculture	
Harold Garfield Behan		1977	For distinguished service to local government and primary industry	
Arnold Lucas Bennett		1975	In recognition of service to legal advocacy	
Angus Bethune		1979	In recognition of service to the Federal Parliament [sic]	; the reference to the “Federal Parliament” appears to be an error, as Bethune was never a member of that parliament
Max Bingham		1988	In recognition of service to the law, crime prevention, parliament and the community	
Cyril Pangbourne Bird		1968		
Hermann Black		1974	Chancellor of the University of Sydney	
Charles Blackburn		1936	Member of the NSW Council of the BMA	; also KCMG
Richard Blackburn		1983	In recognition of service to law	
Robert Blackwood		1961	In recognition of service to Monash University	
James Blair		1930	Chief Justice of Queensland	; also KCMG
Thomas Blamey		1935	Commissioner of Police in Victoria	; also KCB, GBE
Henry Bland		1965	Secretary of the Department of Labour	
Lavington Bonython		1935	In recognition of service to philanthropy	
Stewart Bovell		1976	For long and outstanding service to Western Australia	
Geoffrey Fraser Bowen		1977	In recognition of distinguished service to commerce in the field of banking.	
John Bowser		1927	Speaker of the Victorian Legislative Assembly	
Jack Brabham		1979	In recognition of service to motor sport	
Donald Bradman		1949	In recognition of service to the sport of cricket	
William Lawrence Bragg		1941		
Laurence Brodie-Hall		1982	In recognition of service to the mining industry in WA	
Norman Brookes		1939	In recognition of service to public service	
Wilfred Deakin Brookes		1979		
Allen Brown		1956	Secretary of the Prime Minister's Department	
Thomas Buckland		1935	Chairman of the Bank of New South Wales	
Harry Budd		1970		
John Bunting		1964	Secretary to the Prime Minister's Department	; also KBE
Macfarlane Burnet		1951	Services to biological research	; also KBE, AK
Walter Burnett		1988	Services to the community	
Sam Burston		1977	In recognition of service to primary industry	
Richard Butler I		1913	Former premier of South Australia	
John Butters		1927	Commissioner of the Federal Capital Commission	
Maurice Byers		1982	In recognition of service to public service	
Bede Callaghan		1976	In recognition of service to banking	
Frank Callaway		1981	In recognition of service to music education	
Bernard Callinan		1977	Victoria [sic]	
Ewen Paul Cameron		1961	Minister of Health in Victoria	
Roy Cameron		1957	Pathologist	
Walter Campbell		1979	In recognition of service to government, law and education	
Edward Carlile		1913	Parliamentary Draftsman Victoria	
Alan Carmody		1978	In recognition of service to the Public service	
Roderick Carnegie		1978	In recognition of service to industry	
Stanley Carver		1962	Commonwealth Statistician	
Walter Cawthorn		1958	High Commissioner to Pakistan	
Michael Chamberlin		1964		
Frederick Oliver Chilton		1969		
Giles Chippindall		1955		
Raphael Cilento		1935	Director-general of the Queensland Health Dept	
Christopher Clark	living	2015	For services to British German relations	
Hector Clayton		1968	In recognition of service to commerce	
Donald Cleland		1961	Administrator of Papua New Guinea	
Ian Clunies Ross		1954	Chairman of the CSIRO	
Timothy Coghlan		1914	Agent-General for New South Wales in London	; also KCMG
Edward Cohen		1970	Businessman and philanthropist	
William Cole		1981	In recognition of service to the public service	
Hal Colebatch		1927	Agent-General for Western Australian in London	
Arthur Coles		1960	In recognition of service to public service	
Edgar Coles		1959	In recognition of service to philanthropy	
George Coles		1957	Director of the National Bank of Australia	
Kenneth Coles		1957	In recognition of service to charities	
Norman Coles		1977	In recognition of service to commerce	
Francis Raymond Connelly		1948	Lord Mayor of Melbourne	
James Connolly		1920	Agent-General for the State of Western Australia	
Alan Cooley		1976	In recognition of service to the Public service	
Pope Cooper		1904	Chief Justice of Queensland	; also KCMG
Walter Cooper		1959	Minister for Repatriation	
John Cornforth		1977		
Charles Court		1972	In recognition of service to the government of WA	; also AK, KCMG
Darcy Cowan		1955	In recognition of service to medicine	
John Cowan		1944	Member of the South Australia Legislative Council	
Zelman Cowen		1976	Vice-Chancellor of the University of Queensland	; also AK, GCMG, GCVO
Norman Cowper		1967	n/a	
John Cramer		1964	Minister for the Army	
John Crawford		1959	Secretary of the Department of Trade	
Robert Crichton-Brown		1972		also KCMG 1980
Lynton Crosby	living	2015	For political service	This award was made on the recommendation of the UK Government; Also AO
James Cruthers		1980	In recognition of service to the arts and television in WA	
Arthur Cudmore		1945	President of the South Australia Medical Board	; also CMG
Collier Cudmore		1958	Member - South Australia Legislative Council	
William Portus Cullen		1912	Lt Governor & Chief Justice of NSW	; also KCMG
Adrian Curlewis		1967	In recognition of service to the community	
Neil Currie		1982	In recognition of service to the public	
Leo Cussen		1922	Judge of the Supreme Court of Victoria	
William Dargie		1970	Chairman – Commonwealth Art Advisory Board	
Frederick Darley		1887		also KCMG, GCMG
James Darling		1968	Chairman of the ABC	
Peter Delamothe		1973	Agent-General for Queensland in London	
Harold "Jack" Dickinson		1975	Chairman of the NSW Public Service Board	
Leslie Diver		1975	Services to local government in WA	
William Dobell		1966	In recognition of service to the arts	
John Dodds				also KCMG
Lorimer Dods		1962	In recognition of service to medicine, particularly in the field of paedeatrics [sic]	
Lloyd Dumas		1946	In recognition of service to the Public service in South Australia	
Russell Dumas		1959	In recognition of service to the Public service	; also KBE
Frederick Dutton		1921		
John Dwyer		1946	Chief Justice of Western Australia	; also KCMG
Walter Dwyer		1949	President of the Arbitration Court of WA	
Gilbert Dyett		1934	National President of the RSL 1919–1946	
Clifden Henry Andrews Eager		1945	Member – Victoria War Advisory Committee	; also KBE
Donald Eckersley		1981	In recognition of service to primary industry	
Rod Eddington	living			This award was made on the recommendation of the UK Government
Llew Edwards			Services to the Parliament of Queensland	
Vincent Fairfax		1971	In recognition of service to youth, finance and the press	
Warwick Oswald Fairfax		1967	In recognition of service to the community	
Marc Feldmann	living	2010	For services to Medicine	; also AC
Raymond Ferrall		1981	In recognition of service to industry, commerce and to the community	; also CBE
James Hurtle Fisher		1860	President of the Legislative Council, South Australia	First resident of South Australia to be knighted
Norman Seymour Fletcher		1977	services to the agricultural and pastoral industries.	
Howard Florey		1944		; also a life peer
Geoffrey Foot		1984	In recognition of service to the community	
James Foots		1975	In recognition of service to the mining industry in Queensland	
Frank Fox		1926	Fellowship of British Empire Exhibition	
Nathaniel Bernard Freeman		1967	In recognition of service to public welfare	; also CBE (Civil)
Leslie Froggatt		1981	In recognition of service to commerce and industry	
John Fuller		1974	Minister for Development in New South Wales	
Robert Garran		1917	Commonwealth Solicitor-General	; also KCMG, GCMG
Arthur George		1972	In recognition of service to the Australian/Greek community	
Archibald Glenn		1966	For distinguished service, particularly as Chairman of the Interim Council of Latrobe University	
James Gobbo		1982	Services to migrants	
John Goodsell		1968	Chairman of the NSW Public Service Board	
James Hay Gosse		1947	In recognition of public service in South Australia	
Albert Gould		1908	In recognition of service as President of the Senate	
Andrew Grimwade		1980	Services to industry & commerce	
Roy Grounds		1969	Architecture	
John Winthrop Hackett		1911	Member of the Legislative Council of WA	; also KCMG
William Henry Hall		1968	Services to ex-servicemen	; also KBE
Clarence Harders		1977	Public service	
James Hardy		1981	Services to yachting	
David Hay		1979	Public service	
Bernard Heinze		1949	Professor of Music at Melbourne University	
Lenox Hewitt		1971	For service as Secretary of the Prime Minister's Department	
Peter Heydon		1970	Secretary of the Department of Immigration	
Tasman Heyes		1960	Secretary of the Department of Immigration	
Leo Hielscher		1987	Public service	
David Higgins	living	2011	For services to regeneration as the chief executive of the Olympics Delivery Authority	This award was made on the recommendation of the UK Government
Michael Hintze	living	2013	Philanthropist. For services to the Arts	; also AM
James Holden		1963	Director of General Motors-Holden	
John Holland		1973	Services to engineering	(as Holland, Clifton Vaughan)
Samuel Hordern		1919	President of the NSW Royal Agricultural Society	; also KBE
Henry Rudolph Howard		1961	Lord Mayor of Perth	; also KBE
Edward Stuart Reginald Hughes		1977	For distinguished service to medicine	
Herbert Hyland		1952	Leader of the Victorian Country Party	
Brian Inglis		1977	Services to industry	
Lawrence Jackson		1964	Senior Puisne Judge in Western Australia	; also KCMG
Robert Jackson		1956		also KCVO
Walter James		1907	Agent-General for Western Australia in London	also KCMG
Asher Joel		1971	Services to the community	; also KBE
Henry Jones		1919	Tasmanian businessman, head of H. Jones & Co. IXL	
Keith Jones		1980		
Arthur Llewellyn Jones	living	2024	Services to Business and to the Community.	; also OBE. This award was made on the recommendation of the PNG Government
Bernard Katz		1969		
William Kearney	living	1982	Services to the law in Papua New Guinea	
Charles Kingsford Smith		1932	For services to Aviation in the Commonwealth of Australia	
Richard Kingsland		1978	Public Service	
John Kirwan		1930	President of the WA Legislative Council	; also KCMG
George Knibbs		1923	Director of the Bureau of Science & Industry	
Errol Knox		1949	Public Service	(Note; His middle name is seen in this citation as "Gabrial" [sic] but it was in fact "Galbraith")
William Knox		1979	Deputy Premier and Treasurer of Queensland, 1976 to 1978	; also KSJI
Alfred Langler		1927	Director of West Australian Newspapers	
Peter Lawler		1981	Public service	; also OBE
Luke Leake		1897		
Walter Lee		1920	Premier of Tasmania	; also KCMG
Ernest Augustus Lee Steere		1948	Public service	
John Lienhop		1952	Agent-General for Victoria in London	
Albert Lind		1951	Member of the Legislative Assembly of Victoria	
Nicholas Lockyer		1926	Chairman of the Forces Canteen Trust Fund	
Raymond Douglas Logan		1983	Services to cattle industry in Queensland	
David Walter Longland		1977	Services to the Crown & cerebral palsied in Qld	
Frank Lowy	living	2017	Businessman, philanthropist	This award was made on the recommendation of the UK Government; Also AC
Kenneth Luke		1962	Businessman	
Peter MacCallum		1953	Dean of Medicine at the University of Melbourne	
Alexander MacCormick		1913	Services to medicine in New South Wales	; also KCMG
Charles Mackellar		1912	President of the NSW State Children's Relief Board	; also KCMG
Charles Mackerras		1979		
John Madden		1893		also KCMG, GCMG
Thomas Maltby		1949	Speaker of the Victorian Legislative Assembly	
Thomas Chester Manifold		1953	Services to politics & the public	; also KBE
Frederick Mann		1933	Judge of the Supreme Court of Victoria	(as Fred Mann); also KCMG
Norman Martin		1949	Agent-General for Victoria in London	
Robert Mathers		1981	Queensland businessman; Chairman of Mathers Shoes	
Robert May		1995		also a life peer
John McCall		1911	Agent-General for Tasmania in London	; also KCMG
Graham McCamley		1986		
Eric McClintock		1981		
Leslie McConnan		1951	Chief manager of the National Bank of Australia	
James McCusker		1983	Services to building societies in WA	
Osborn McCutcheon		1966	Services to architecture	
Charles George McDonald		1962	Services to the medical profession	; also KBE
Robert Ross McDonald		1950	Minister of Housing & Forests in WA	
Ian McFarlane		1984	Mining businessman	
Malcolm Kenneth McIntosh		1995	Chief of Defence Procurement, (UK) Ministry of Defence	
William McKie		1953	Organist and Master of the Choristers, Westminster Abbey	
John McLaren		1935	Secretary, London High Commission	
Robert McMillan		1916	Chief Justice of Western Australia	; also KCMG
John Medley		1948	Vice-Chancellor of the University of Melbourne	
Archie Michaelis		1952	Speaker of the Victoria Legislative Assembly	
Jonathan Mills	living	2013	Composer and arts festival director	Awarded by UK government; Also AO
William Henry Fancourt Mitchell		1875	Police officer, politician	
William Mitchell (philosopher)		1927	Vice-Chancellor, Chancellor, University of Adelaide	
Frank Moore				
John Morris		1943	Chief Justice of Tasmania	; also KCMG
Peter Morris				
Laurence Muir				
Angus Murray (doctor)		1966	President of the Australian Medical Association	
Norman Myer		1956	For public and philanthropic services in the State of Victoria	
Crawford Nalder		1974	Deputy Premier of Western Australia	
Mellis Napier		1943	Lt Governor & Chief Justice of South Australia	; also KCMG
Charles Nathan		1928	Development & Migration Commission	
Eric Neal				
Douglas Nicholls		1972	Advancement of the Aboriginal people	; also KCVO
Herbert Nicholls		1916	Chief Justice of Tasmania	; also KCMG
Arthur William Nicholson		1968		
Robert Norman		1989	Services to the people of North Queensland	
Thomas North		1982	Services to the retail industry	
Gustav Nossal	living			
Desmond O'Neil		1979	Deputy Premier of Western Australia	
Hubert Opperman		1968	High Commissioner to Malta	
Frank Packer		1959	Services to journalism & newspaper industry	; also KBE
Herbert Kingsley Paine		1953	Judge	
Arvi Parbo		1977	Services to industry	
Stephen Parker		1908	Chief Justice of Western Australia	; also KCMG
Nick Parkinson		1979	Ambassador to the USA	
Herbert Angas Parsons		1936	Puisne Judge in South Australia	(shown as Herbert Angus Parsons); also KBE
Dennis Paterson				
George Whitecross Paton		1957	Vice Chancellor Melbourne University	
Arthur Petfield		1968		
William Pettingell		1972	Services to finance and government	
John Pidgeon				
Noel Power		1999	Lately Acting-Chief Justice, Hong Kong	
William Prentice		1977	Services to the law (Papua New Guinea)	
Louis Pyke		1978	Services to the Multiple Sclerosis Society	
James Ramsay		1976	Lieutenant-Governor of Western Australia	; also KCMG, KCVO
John Ramsay		1939	Services to surgery	
Thomas Meek Ramsay		1972	For public service and services to commerce	
Richard Randall				
Benjamin Rank		1972	Services to medicine	
William Refshauge		1966	Director-general of health	
Clem Renouf		1988	Outstanding service to the community	
Horace Richardson (retailer)		1953	Public service	
Robert Risson		1970		
Malcolm Ritchie (Thomas Malcolm Ritchie)		1951	Services to politics	
Stephen Henry Roberts		1965	Vice-Chancellor of the University of Sydney	; also CMG
Macpherson Robertson		1932	Services to Antarctic expeditions	; also KBE
Roy Robinson		1931	Services to forestry	He was an expatriate in the United Kingdom; in 1947 he was raised to the hereditary peerage, but his barony became extinct upon his death in 1952
Thomas Robinson		1910	Agent-General for Queensland in London	; also KCMG, KBE, GBE
Dudley Bruce Ross		1962	Judge of the Supreme Court of South Australia	
Sydney Schubert		1985	Permanent Head, Qld Premier's Department	
Harold Seddon		1951	President of the Legislative Council, State of Western Australia	
Francis Selleck		1956	Lord Mayor of Melbourne	; also KBE
Allan Sewell (John Allan Sewell)		1977	Auditor-General of Queensland	
Christopher Sheehy		1959	Chairman Australian Dairy Produce Board	; also OBE
Nicholas Shehadie		1976	Lord Mayor of Sydney	; also AC, OBE
Mark Sheldon		1922	Services to the Commonwealth	; also KBE
Hercules Sinnamon		1985	Services to the community	; also OBE
Pascal Soriot	living	2022	Services to the community, principally the AstraZeneca vaccine	
John Soundy		1954	For service to the community of Hobart as Lord Mayor and Member of the Legislative Council	
John Spicer		1963	Chief Judge – Commonwealth Industrial Court	
Charles Spry		1964	Public service	; also CBE
George Stening		1968	CEO of the Order of St John of Jerusalem	
Lancelot Stirling		1902	President of the SA Legislative Council	; also KCMG
Edward Stone		1902	Chief Justice of Western Australia	; also KCMG
Colin Syme		1963	President of the Walter and Eliza Hall Institute of Research	; also AK
George Tallis		1922	Services to the Commonwealth; services to the theatre and for wartime fund-raising	
Gordon Taylor		1954	Aviator	
Leslie Thiess		1971	Mining and construction	
Robert Thomas		1909	Newspaper proprietor	
Evan Rees Whitaker Thomson		1977	Services to the medical profession and related fields of endeavour	
Joseph Totterdell		1953	Lord Mayor of Perth	
(Sydney) Lance Townsend		1971	Professor of Obstetrics at Melbourne University	
Thomas Travers		1972	Services to medicine	
Leon Trout		1959	Public service in Queensland	
Ian Turbott		1967		(knighthood awarded before emigrating to Australia)
William Tyree		1975	Services to the community	; also OBE
William Vines		1976	Services to primary industry	; also AC, CMG
Eric von Schramek		1981	Services to architecture	
Charles Wade		1918	Agent-General for New South Wales in London	; also KCMG
Samuel Walder		1933	Lord Mayor of Sydney	
Gordon Wallace		1968		
Arthur Warner		1956	Minister of Transport in Victoria	; also KBE
Bruce Watson		1985	Services to Queensland industry	
Alan Westerman		1963	Secretary of the Department of Trade	; also CBE
Guy Weston		2020	Philanthropist.	This award was made on the recommendation of the UK Government
Frederick Wheeler		1967	Chairman of the Public Service Board	; also CBE
Roland Wilson		1955	Secretary to the Treasury	; also CBE
Henry Winneke		1957	Solicitor-General of Victoria	; also KCMG, KCVO
Edward Woodward		1982	Public Service	
Reg Wright		1978	Services to the Parliament of Tasmania	
Geoffrey Yeend		1979	Public service	; also AC, CBE
Harold Wyndham		1969	Services to education	
John Yocklunn		1975	In recognition of politics and government in Papua New Guinea	; also KCVO

== New Zealand Order of Merit ==
Some Australians have dual citizenship with New Zealand. New Zealand awards knighthoods and damehoods through the New Zealand Order of Merit. All citizens of Commonwealth realms are eligible to be appointed to the order in any grade.

=== Knights Companion ===
Name	Living	Date	Citation	Reference and comments
Scott Dixon	living	2026	For services to motorsport	

=== Dames Companion ===
Name	Living	Date	Citation	Reference and comments
Adrienne Stewart	living	2014	Arts patron	

== Non-Australian knights and dames with significant Australian associations ==
Name	Nationality	Living	Honour	Reference and comments
George 'Gubby' Allen	Australian-born British		Knight Bachelor	Allen was born in Australia but lived most of his life in the UK, captaining the England cricket team.
James Atkin, Baron Atkin	British		Knight Bachelor	Atkin was born in Queensland to British migrant parents, moving with his mother to Wales at age 4. His father subsequently died in Queensland. He was a prominent British appellate judge of the second quarter of the twentieth century.
Edric Bastyan	British		KCMG, KCVO, KBE	After his term as Governor of Tasmania ended in 1973, Bastyan remained in Australia, where he died in 1980.
Dallas Brooks	British		GCMG, KCB, KCVO	After his term as Governor of Victoria ended in 1963, Brooks remained in Australia, where he died in 1966.
George Cartland	British		Knight Bachelor	Cartland spent a significant period in Australia, becoming Vice-Chancellor of the University of Tasmania 1968–78, and Chairman of the Tasmanian Council of the Trade Union Training Authority 1979–91, among other things.
King Charles III	Resides in the UK	living	AK	Although King of Australia, King Charles III is not personally an Australian citizen. To overcome this barrier to his being appointed a substantive Knight of the Order of Australia, the Constitution of the Order of Australia was amended by Letters Patent to specifically include him, when he was Prince of Wales. He became the Sovereign of the Order on 8 September 2022 upon the death of Queen Elizabeth II.
Cicely Courtneidge	British		DBE	Courtneidge was born in Australia but her career was conducted mainly in the UK and she was generally considered a British actress.
Charles Gairdner	British		GBE, KCMG, KCVO	After his term as Governor of Tasmania ended (he had also previously been Governor of Western Australia), he retired to Perth, where he died in 1983
Martin Gilliat	British		KCVO, GCVO	Gilliat was military secretary to the governor-general (presumably Sir William Slim) for some time. There is no evidence he had any other Australian association.
John Winthrop Hackett	Australian-born British		GCB	Hackett was born in Australia; his father Sir John Winthrop Hackett, senior was a newspaper proprietor, WA politician, and founding chancellor of the University of Western Australia. Hackett junior was based in the UK from his early 20s, becoming a general in the British Army and a writer. He died in 1997.
Archbishop David Hand	Australian-born Papua New Guinean		KBE	Geoffrey David Hand was an Australian Anglican priest who was the first person to adopt Papua New Guinea citizenship upon independence in 1975. He had already been appointed a CBE by Australia, and was knighted on a recommendation of the PNG government
Barry Holloway	Australian-born Papua New Guinean		KBE	Holloway was born in Tasmania and is buried there. He was a co-founder of Papua New Guinea's Pangu Party, became a PNG citizen upon independence, and was the inaugural Speaker of the Parliament of Papua New Guinea; he was knighted on a recommendation of the PNG government
Rex Nan Kivell	New Zealand-born British		Knight Bachelor	His extraordinary collection of Australiana was sold to the National Library of Australia at a fraction of its true value. He was knighted by the Australian Government in 1976, even though he never visited Australia.
Prince Philip, Duke of Edinburgh	Resided in the UK		AK	Prince Philip, while spouse of the Queen of Australia, was not personally an Australian citizen. To overcome this barrier to his being appointed a substantive Knight of the Order of Australia, the Constitution of the Order of Australia was amended by Letters Patent to specifically include him.
Garfield Sobers	Barbadian (later Barbadian-Australian)		Knight Bachelor	Sobers was knighted in 1975 for services to cricket. The award was made in the British Diplomatic and Overseas section of the 1975 New Year Honours List, rather than on the nomination of the Government of Barbados, which had then temporarily stopped putting forward recommendations for British honours. Sobers played cricket for South Australia 1961–64, he was married to an Australian 1969–90, and he acquired Australian citizenship through marriage in 1980, becoming a dual Barbadian-Australian citizen. He resided in Barbados.

== See also ==
- Living Australian knights and dames
- List of knights and dames of the Order of Australia
- Australian peers and baronets
