= Chancellor of the Order of Australia =

Political office in Australia

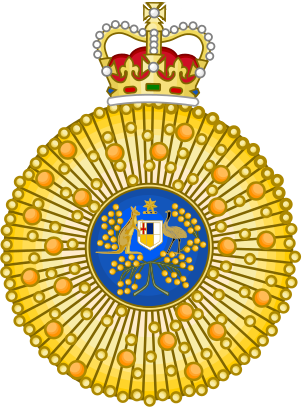
Badge of a Knight and a Dame of the Order of Australia

This is a list of chancellors of the Order of Australia. The position is held by the person who occupies the office of Governor-General of Australia.

Governors-General become Chancellor of the Order on assuming the office of Governor-General. The formal title of this position reflects the rank of the incumbent within the Order of Australia, which has changed over time along with the statutes of the order (see 'Brief history' below). The office is referred to as Chancellor and Principal Knight if the incumbent is a 'Knight of the Order of Australia' (AK), as Chancellor and Principal Dame if the incumbent is a 'Dame of the Order of Australia' (AD), or as Chancellor and Principal Companion if the incumbent is a 'Companion of the Order of Australia' (AC).

== List of chancellors ==
Name	Title	Time	Cumulative time
The Right Honourable Sir John Kerr, AK, GCMG, GCVO, QC	Chancellor and Principal Companion	1 year, 99 days	1 year, 99 days
The Right Honourable Sir John Kerr, AK, GCMG, GCVO, QC	Chancellor and Principal Knight	1 year, 198 days	9 years, 283 days
The Right Honourable Sir Zelman Cowen, AK, GCMG, GCVO, QC	Chancellor and Principal Knight	4 years, 233 days	9 years, 283 days
The Right Honourable Sir Ninian Stephen, KG, AK, GCMG, GCVO, KBE, QC	Chancellor and Principal Knight	3 years, 217 days	9 years, 283 days
The Right Honourable Sir Ninian Stephen, KG, AK, GCMG, GCVO, KBE, QC	Chancellor and Principal Companion	2 years, 349 days	28 years, 21 days
The Honourable William Hayden, AC	Chancellor and Principal Companion	7 years, 0 days	28 years, 21 days
The Honourable Sir William Deane, AC, KBE, QC	Chancellor and Principal Companion	5 years, 133 days	28 years, 21 days
The Right Reverend and Honourable Peter Hollingworth, AC, OBE	Chancellor and Principal Companion	2 years, 43 days	28 years, 21 days
Major General The Honourable Michael Jeffery, AC, CVO, MC	Chancellor and Principal Companion	5 years, 25 days	28 years, 21 days
The Honourable Dame Quentin Bryce, AD, CVO	Chancellor and Principal Companion	5 years, 201 days	28 years, 21 days
The Honourable Dame Quentin Bryce, AD, CVO	Chancellor and Principal Dame	3 days	3 days
General The Honourable Sir Peter Cosgrove, AK, MC	Chancellor and Principal Knight	5 years, 95 days	5 years, 95 days
General The Honourable David Hurley, AC, CVO, DSC	Chancellor and Principal Companion	5 years, 248 days	5 years, 248 days

== Brief history ==
The Order of Australia is the only Australian order of chivalry (although certain dynastic British orders of chivalry, such as the Order of the Garter, the Order of the Thistle and the Royal Victorian Order, may still be awarded to Australians by the Monarch). It was established on 14 February 1975 by the Monarch to recognise Australian citizens and other persons for achievement, meritorious service, or for both. At its establishment, the Order of Australia included three grades: Companion, Officer and Member, and two Divisions: Civil and Military.

On 24 May 1976, the grades of Knight (AK) and Dame (AD), and the Medal of the Order of Australia, were established by the Monarch on the advice of Prime Minister Malcolm Fraser, and the Civil Division was renamed the General Division. Knight and Dame of the Order of Australia superseded Companion of the Order as the highest grade, however Knight/Dame is only awarded in the General Division of the Order.

Recipients who are not Australian citizens may be appointed Honorary Knights or Dames, although no such appointments have yet been made. Although Heir to the Australian throne, Charles, Prince of Wales, is not an Australian citizen; to avoid his appointment being as an Honorary Knight, the Constitution of the Order of Australia was amended by Letters Patent to enable him to be a substantive Knight.

Following the 1983 election, Prime Minister Bob Hawke advised the abolition of the Knight and Dame grades. On 3 March 1986, the Monarch co-signed Letters Patent revoking the categories of Knight and Dame – existing Knights and Dames were not affected by this change. Following his election in 2013, Prime Minister Tony Abbott advised the Queen to reinstate the categories of Dame and Knight. In March 2014, the Queen co-signed Letters Patent to bring this into effect.

== See also ==
- Australian knights and dames
- Living Australian knights and dames
- List of knights and dames of the Order of Australia
- List of companions of the Order of Australia
