= President of the Liberal Party of Australia =

Political party official in Australia

President of the Liberal Party

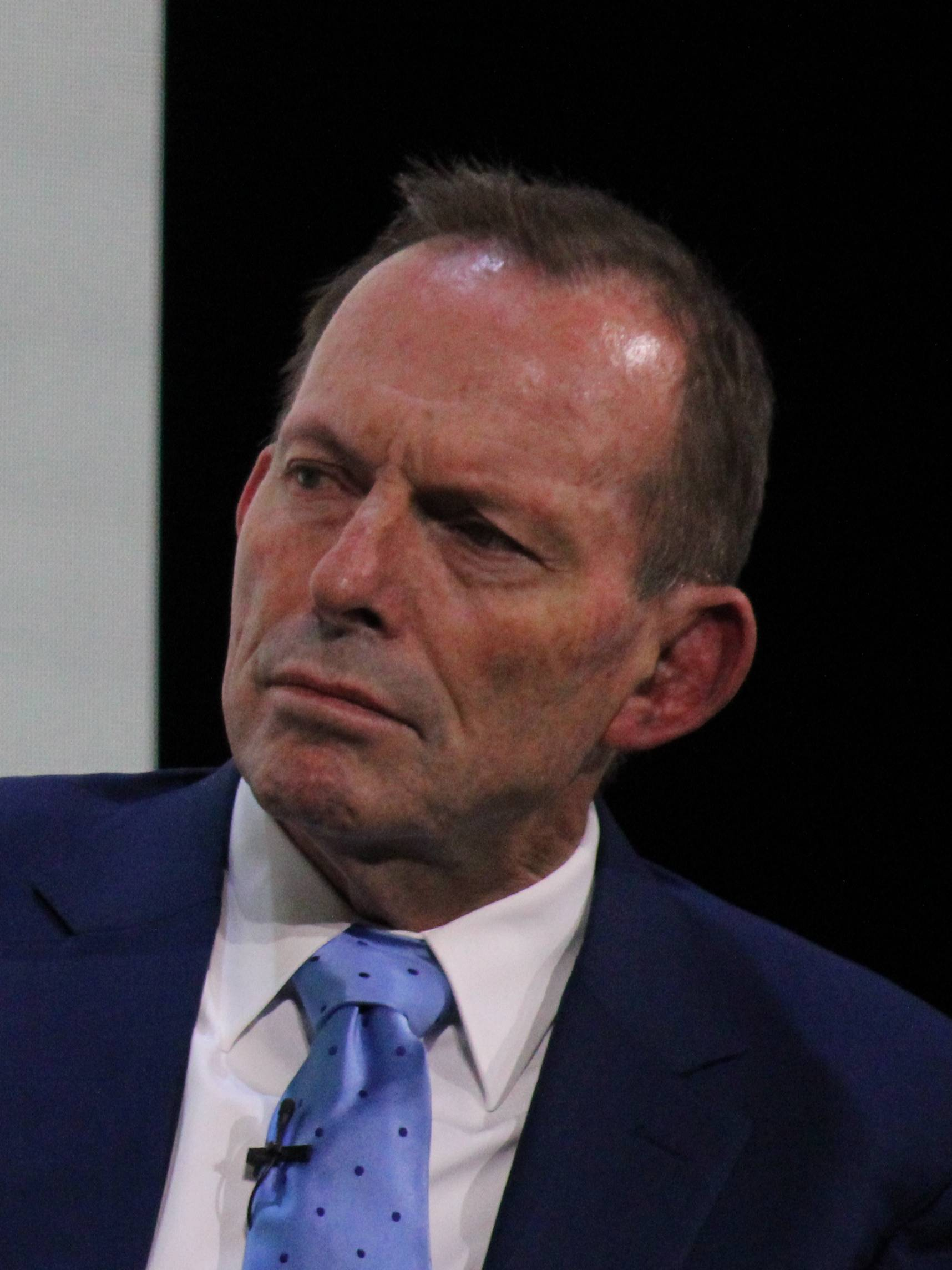
- Incumbent; Tony Abbott since 29 May 2026
- Member of: Federal Executive; Federal Council
- Term length: No fixed term
- Constituting instrument: Clause 11.1, Constitution of the Federal Liberal Party
- Inaugural holder: Malcolm Ritchie
- Formation: 1945; 81 years ago

The president of the Liberal Party of Australia is a senior position within the federal Liberal Party. A member of both the party's two governing bodies (Federal Council, Federal Executive), the position was established at the same time as the party's foundation. The position was established by the party's constitution and has had nineteen different office-holders. The current president is former prime minister Tony Abbott, elected president in May 2026.

== Presidents of the Liberal Party ==
Note: the right-hand column does not allocate height proportional to time in office.

A list of leaders (including acting leaders) since 1945.

No.	Leader (birth–death)	Portrait	Took office	Left office	State	Other/former positions
1	Malcolm Ritchie (1894–1971)		July–September 1945	2 September 1947	Victoria	Federal provisional chairman.
2	Richard Casey (1890–1976)		2 September 1947	10 December 1949 (Note: Casey resigned the post of President following his election to the House of Representatives for La Trobe.)	Victoria	MP for Corio (1931–1940); 15th Treasurer of Australia (1935–1939); 1st Minister to the United States (1940–1942); Governor of Bengal (1944–1946).
No federal president between 11 December 1949 – 26 January 1950.
(1)	Malcolm Ritchie (1894–1971)		27 January 1950	19 November 1951	Victoria	President of the Liberal Party.
3	W. H. Anderson (1897–1968)		19 November 1951	13 November 1956	Victoria	—N/a
4	Lyle Moore (1899–1982)		13 November 1956	14–17 November 1960	New South Wales	President of the New South Wales Liberal Party (1949–1956).
5	Philip McBride (1892–1982)		14–17 November 1960	9 November 1965	South Australia	MP for Grey (1931–1937) and Wakefield (1946–1958); Senator for South Australia (1937–1944); 39th Minister for Defence (1950–1958).
6	Jock Pagan (1892–1982)		9 November 1965	9 June 1970	New South Wales	President of the New South Wales Liberal Party (1962–1965).
7	Robert Southey (1922–1998)		9 June 1970	11 October 1975	Victoria	—N/a
8	John Atwill (1926–2001)		11 October 1975	15 May 1982	New South Wales	President of the New South Wales Liberal Party (1970–1975).
9	A. J. Forbes (1923–2019)		15 May 1982	18 July 1985	South Australia	MP for Barker (1956–1975); Minister for the Navy (1963–1964); Minister for the Army (1963–1966); Minister for Health (1966–1971); Minister for Immigration (1971–1972); President of the South Australian Liberal Party (1979–1982);
10	John Valder (1931–2017)		18 July 1985	30 October 1987	—N/a	—N/a
11	John Elliott (1941–2021)		30 October 1987	23 October 1990	Victoria	—N/a
12	Ashley Goldsworthy (b. 1935)		23 October 1990	28 August 1993	Queensland	Vice-president of the Liberal Party.
13	Tony Staley (1939–2023)		28 August 1993	2 July 1999	Victoria	MP for Chisholm (1970–1980); Minister for the Capital Territory (1976–1977); Minister for Post and Telecommunications (1977–1980).
14	Shane Stone (b. 1950)		2 July 1999	25 June 2005	Victoria; Northern Territory	Northern Territory MLA for Port Darwin (1990–2000); Chief Minister of the Northern Territory (1995–1999).
15	Chris McDiven (b. 1949)		25 June 2005	19 February 2008	Western Australia; New South Wales	—N/a
16	Alan Stockdale (b. 1945)		19 February 2008	25 June 2014	Victoria	Victoria MP for Brighton (1985–1999); Treasurer of Victoria (1992–1999).
17	Richard Alston (b. 1941)		27 June 2014	24 June 2017	Victoria	Senator for Victoria (1986–2004); Minister for Communications and the Arts (1996–1997); Communications, the Information Economy and the Arts (1997–1998); Communications, Information Technology and the Arts (1998–2003); High Commissioners of Australia to the United Kingdom (2005–2008).
18	Nick Greiner (b. 1941)		24 June 2017	7 August 2020	New South Wales	Premier of New South Wales (1988–1992); Leader of the New South Wales Liberal Party (1983–1992); New South Wales MP for Ku-ring-gai (1980–1992).
19	John Olsen (b. 1945)		7 August 2020	29 May 2026	South Australia	Premier of South Australia (1996–2001); Leader of the South Australian Liberal Party (1982–1990; 1996–2001); President of the South Australian Liberal Party (1976–1979; 2017–2020); Australian Consul General in New York (2006–2009); Australian Consul-General in Los Angeles (2002–2006).
20	Tony Abbott (b. 1957)		29 May 2026	Incumbent	New South Wales	Prime Minister of Australia (2013–2015); Leader of the Opposition (2009–2013); Leader of the Liberal Party (2009–2015); Leader of the House (2002–2007); Minister for Health and Ageing (2003–2007); Minister for Employment and Workplace Relations (2001–2003); Minister for Employment Services (1998–2001); MP for Warringah (1994–2019).
