= Sydney Schubert =

Australian public servant

Sir Sydney Schubert (22 March 1928 – 2 August 2015) was an Australian public servant best known for the work he did in Queensland during the 1970s and 1980s as Co-ordinator General of the Premier's Department, and for his positions as chancellor of Bond University and chief executive of Daikyo Australia.

== Career ==
After graduating from the University of Queensland with two Bachelor degrees, Schubert joined the Department of Main Roads as a cadet in 1945. Schubert took up the position of Chief Engineer in the Coordinator-General's Department in 1969, becoming its head in 1976.

Following an amalgamation of departments in 1982, Schubert's responsibilities increased to administrating state affairs in the Premier's Department during a time when the National Party governed Queensland, led by Sir Joh Bjelke-Petersen.

Schubert was somewhat influential during his time in the Premier's office. In early 1985, Bjelke-Petersen cited concerns raised by Schubert as the reason why he had ordered his ministers to stop having direct contact with the federal government.

In 1991, Schubert gave evidence at Bjelke-Petersen's perjury trial in Brisbane, during which Schubert testified that he didn't recall a 1986 meeting between Bjelke Petersen and Regent overseas principal Adrian Zecha as the prosecution attempted to prove Bjelke-Petersen overrode a cabinet decision which placed conditions on a proposed development involving Zecha.

Schubert retired from public service in 1988, but remained active in public life becoming executive director of Daikyo Australia and chancellor of Bond University.

Just prior to the National Party's loss at the 1989 Queensland election, Schubert was the subject of harsh criticism from Queensland Premier Russell Cooper following an interview Schubert did with ABC Television's The 7.30 Report. In the interview, Schubert implied the business sector had been having difficulty in dealing with the Queensland government while also appearing to praise Cooper's opponent Wayne Goss describing him as "dynamic". This prompted Cooper to describe Schubert's comments as the "bleatings of a thwarted lobbyist" and suggested he wouldn't have time for Schubert should he want to discuss potential developments. Goss described Cooper's comments as "political thuggery".

== Honours ==
Schubert was appointed a Knight Bachelor in 1985 for his outstanding contribution to public service in Queensland.

In 2006, Schubert received an honorary doctorate from James Cook University as recognition for his management of environmental assets in North Queensland.

In 2012, Schubert was named as a "Queensland Great" at the 2012 Queensland Greats Awards, which are held annually to recognise the contributions made by Queenslanders throughout the state's history.

In 2017, the Great Barrier Reef Marine Park Authority posthumously honoured Schubert by naming a reef near Lizard Island as the Sir Sydney Schubert Reef. This was done to recognise Schubert as being one of its founding members who is credited as helping steer the fledgling organisation through its inception in the mid 1970s.

== Personal life ==
Schubert was married to Maureen Kistle, a former Miss Australia who won the title in 1955.

They had two daughters - Marie-Louise and Felicity.

Sydney Schubert died on 2 August 2015.
