= Queensland Art Gallery =

Art museum in Brisbane, Australia

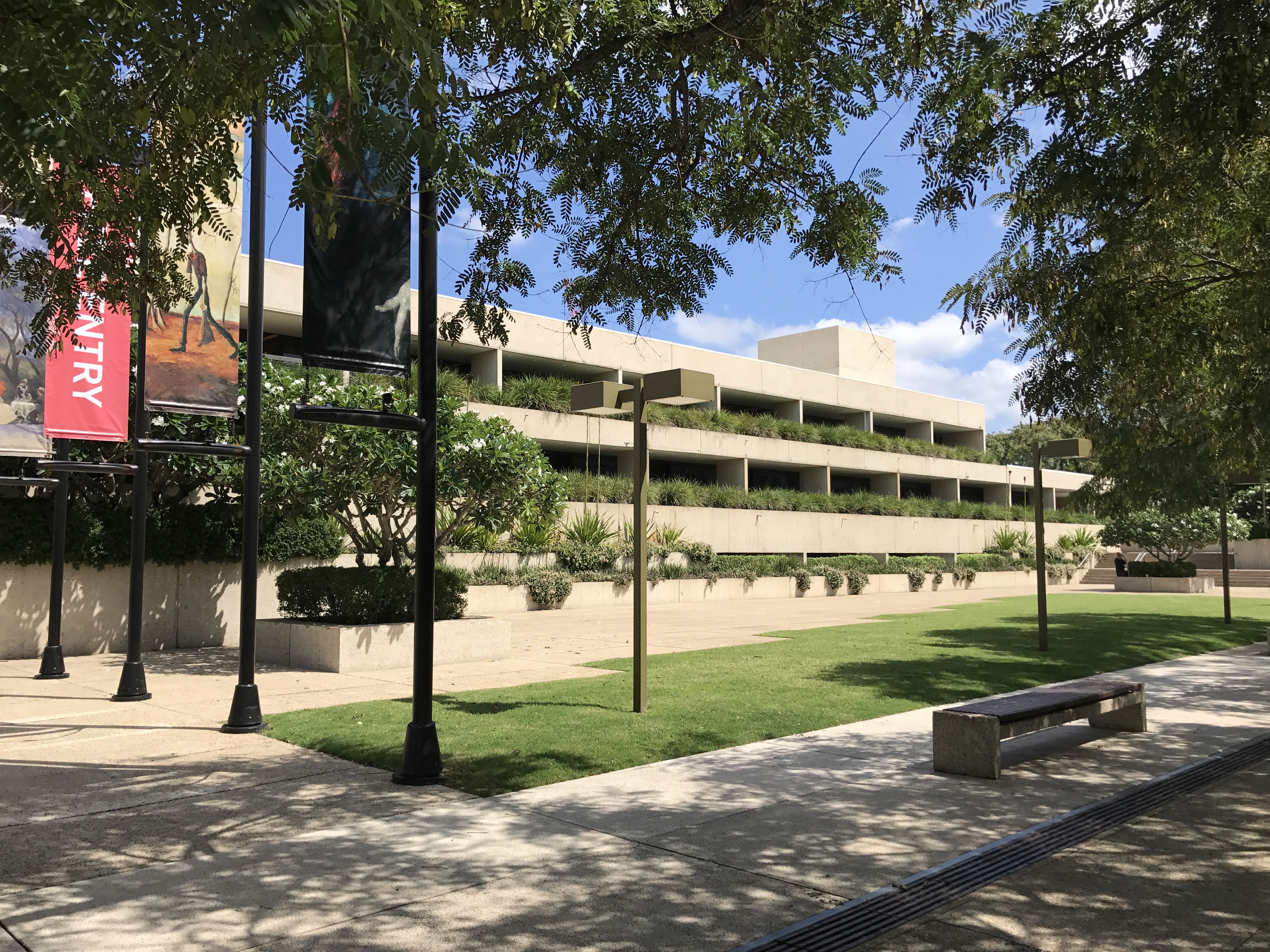
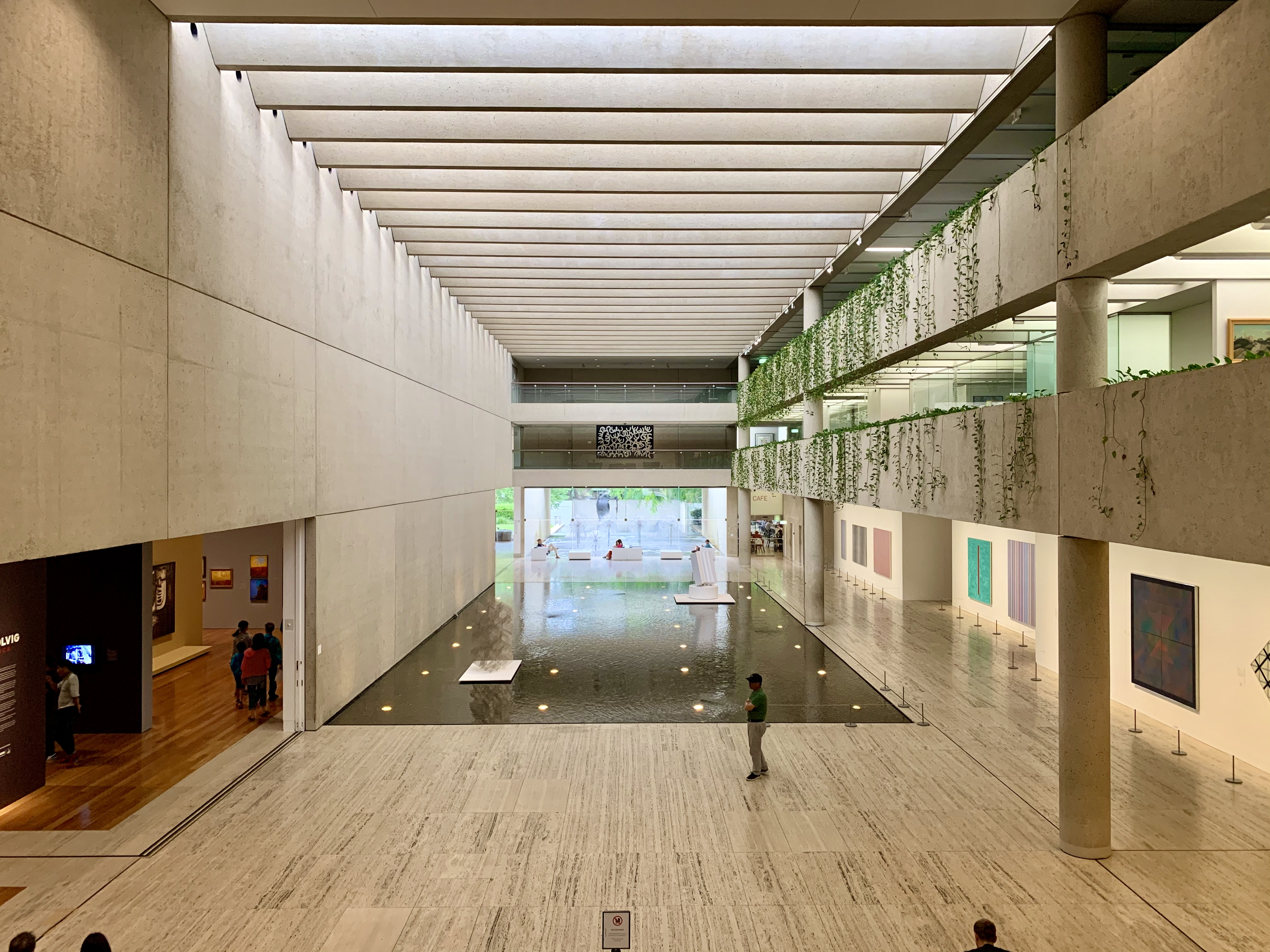
- From top: Queensland Art Gallery riverside façade in South Bank, Entrance atrium and Watermall
- Established: 1895
- Location: Stanley Place, South Brisbane, Brisbane, Queensland, Australia
- Coordinates: 27.472733°S 153.018453°E
- Type: Art museum
- Visitors: 572,762 (2016)
- Director: Chris Saines
- Public transit access: Bus: Cultural Centre station Train: South Brisbane station
- Website: qagoma.qld.gov.au

The Queensland Art Gallery (QAG) is an art museum located in South Bank, Brisbane, Queensland, Australia. The gallery is part of QAGOMA. It complements the Gallery of Modern Art (GOMA) building, situated only 150 metres (490 ft) away.

The Queensland Art Gallery is owned and operated by the Government of Queensland, which created the institution in 1895 as the Queensland National Art Gallery.

== History ==
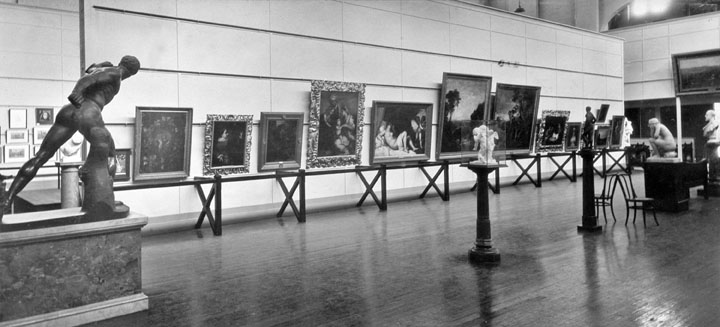
Interior of Queensland Art Gallery, 1931

The gallery was established in 1895 as the Queensland National Art Gallery. Throughout its early history the gallery was housed in a series of temporary premises. In the 1960s it shared premises with the Queensland Museum. Sir Leon Trout, a businessman and art collector, initiated a plan to include an art gallery in a proposed Queensland Cultural Centre in South Brisbane. The first stage of the monumental Robin Gibson-designed Queensland Cultural Centre opened on Brisbane's South Bank in 1982. The Gallery of Modern Art (GOMA) was established in 2006 which lead to the creation of a two-campus institution. In 2014, over 10 million people had visited both the sites since the establishment of GOMA. The Queensland Art Gallery was listed as a State Heritage Place in 2015.

The first painting acquired by the gallery in 1896 was Evicted, by the British painter Blandford Fletcher. Although it was the gallery's most popular picture, it was controversially retired from public display in 1949 by the newly appointed director, Robert Campbell, who declared that it was only popular "because it had a sentimental touch".

== Design ==
The Queensland Art Gallery was considered to be a building of its time for it incorporated the best techniques and materials available within the economic limits of the project. It was also the first major building to be built on the south side of the river adjacent to the new Victoria Bridge, which established a benchmark of scale and quality for future buildings.

The Queensland Art Gallery is a 4700 square metre display space broken down with walls and barriers that interchange between the art world and the public. The walls have been placed purposely to create flow and change of course of the viewer's journey. The primary orientation element of the Gallery's design is the Watermall that separates the tranquil environment of the exhibition galleries from the proactive environments of the administration, public programs and education areas. The varying ceilings heights and floor levels, colour and textured surfaces enhance variety and define the sequence of display areas. The entrance foyer efficiently acts as a hub for the public circulation and main access point for arrivals and departures for all visitors where they are able to select which collections they plan to visit. The buildings use of light coloured and maintenance free materials such as cement reflect and adapt to the Mediterranean- like quality of Brisbane's sub tropical climate.

In 2004 the Queensland Art Gallery (completed in 1982) was awarded the '25 Year Award', now known as the Robin Gibson Award for Enduring Architecture by the Queensland Chapter of the Australian Institute of Architects.

== Collection ==
The gallery's collection includes a number of significant artworks, including the popular:

- La Belle Hollandaise (1905) by Pablo Picasso
- Under the Jacaranda (1903) by Richard Godfrey Rivers

=== Gallery ===
Selected Australian works

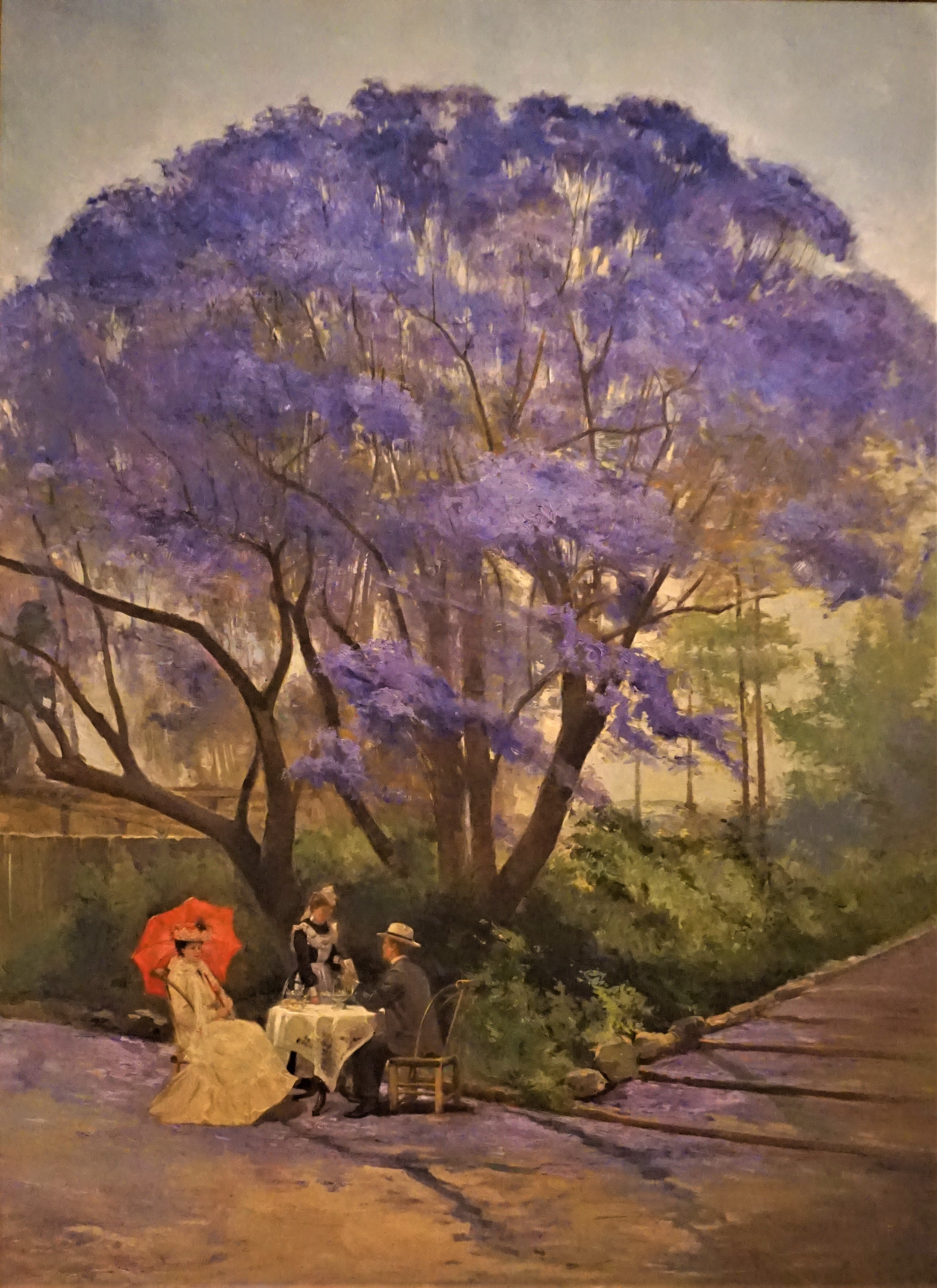
R. Godfrey Rivers, Under The Jacaranda, 1903

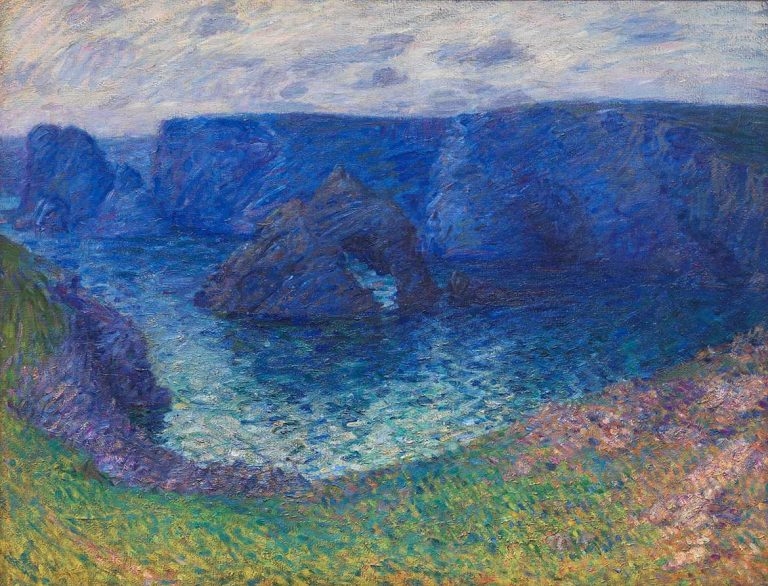
John Russell, Roc Toul (Roche Guibel), 1904

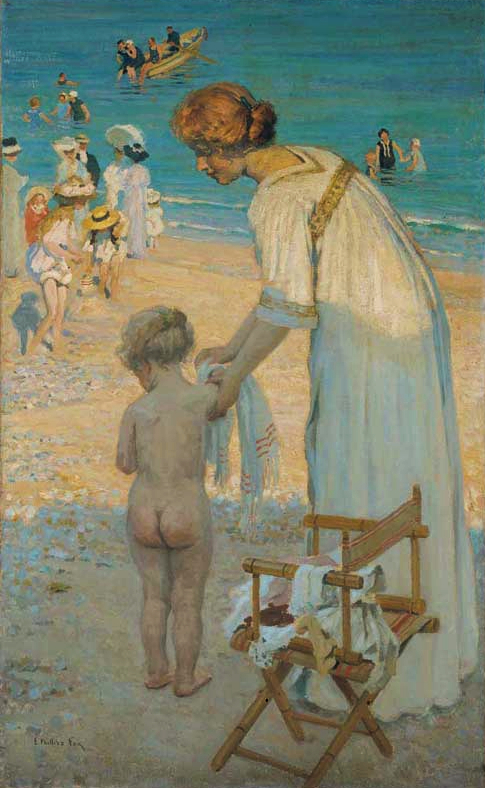
E. Phillips Fox, Bathing Hour, 1909

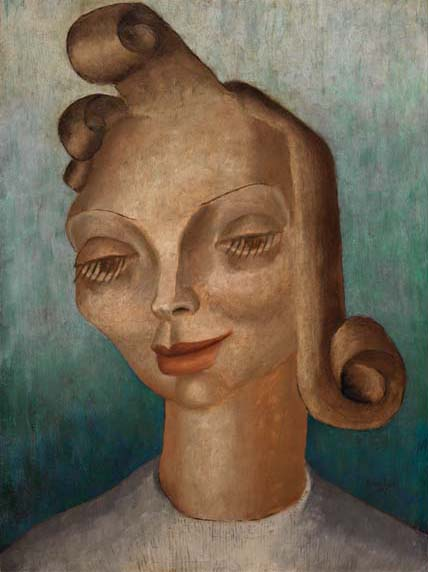
Peter Purves Smith, Lucile, 1937

=== Indigenous art ===
The Gallery is committed to profiling Indigenous Australian art and strengthening relationships with Queensland's Indigenous communities.

== Exhibitions ==
- California Design 1930–1965: Living in a Modern World (2 November 2013 – 9 February 2014)
- Quilts 1700–1945 (15 June–22 September 2013)
- Portrait of Spain: Masterpieces from the Prado (21 July–4 November 2012).
- Hats: An Anthology by Stephen Jones (27 March–27 June 2010)
- American Impressionism and Realism: A Landmark Exhibition from the Met (30 May–20 September 2009)

=== Asia-Pacific Triennial of Contemporary Art ===
The Gallery's flagship project is the Asia Pacific Triennial of Contemporary Art series of exhibitions, now a major event on the national and international arts calendar. The expertise developed since APT1 in 1993 in staging the Triennial has led to the establishment of the Australian Centre of Asia Pacific Art (ACAPA), to foster alliances, scholarship and publishing, and the formation of an internationally significant collection of art from the Asia Pacific region. The 7th Triennial featured Ressort, a giant snake skeleton sculpture by Huang Yong Ping at the gallery's watermall. This work was acquired by the Queensland Art Gallery in 2012.

=== Art for children ===
The Gallery is also recognised as an international leader in presenting innovative museum-based learning programs for children. These programs are coordinated through the Children's Art Centre. Developing youth audiences for visual art is another priority for the Gallery.

- Now is the Time (2 May 2020 – 26 January 2021)
- Below the Tide Line (7 December 2019 – 3 May 2020)
- Island Fashion (10 August 2019 – 15 March 2020)
- APT9 Kids (29 April–16 June 2019)
- Ben Quilty: Family Portrait (15 June–20 October 2019)
- Patricia Piccinini: Curious Creatures (24 March–5 August 2018)
- Tony Albert: We can be Heroes (19 May–7 October 2018)

=== Regional Queensland ===
To ensure all Queenslanders have access to the collection, travelling exhibitions tour to regional centres and remote parts of the state.

== Governance ==
The Gallery's governing body is a board of trustees appointed by the Queensland Government, and it is managed by an Executive Management Team. The current director is Chris Saines.

== Opening hours ==
- Open daily 10.00am to 5.00pm.
- Closed Christmas Day and Good Friday.
- Open from 12 noon ANZAC Day.

== See also ==
- National Gallery of Australia
- National Gallery of Victoria
- Art Gallery of New South Wales
- Art Gallery of South Australia
- Art Gallery of Western Australia
- Tasmanian Museum and Art Gallery
