= Living Australian knights and dames =

The following is a list of living Australians who have been appointed knights or dames.

The list includes:

- Knights and dames of the Order of Australia
- Knights and dames of an Order of Chivalry under the British Imperial Honours system, including
  - Order of the British Empire
  - Royal Victorian Order
  - Order of St Michael and St George
  - Order of the Bath
  - Order of the Garter
- Knights Bachelor (there is no female counterpart).

The list excludes Australian baronets.

== Living dames ==
Name	Year of birth	Year of damehood	Age	Notes
Dame Quentin Bryce AD CVO	1942	2014	83	Australia
Dame Patricia Hewitt DBE	1948	2025	77	United Kingdom
Dame Carol Kidu DBE AO	1948	2005	77	Papua New Guinea
Dame Janet Ritterman DBE	1941	2002	84	United Kingdom
Dame Adrienne Stewart DNZM QSM	1936	2014	90	New Zealand

== Living knights ==
Name	Year of birth	Year of knighthood	Age	KtB	Nominated by
Sir Robert Bates KBE	1940	2026			Papua New Guinea
Professor Sir Ed Byrne AC	1952	2020	74		United Kingdom
Professor Sir Chris Clark	1960	2015	66		United Kingdom
General Sir Peter Cosgrove AK CVO MC	1947	2014	79		Australia
Professor Sir Ross Cranston KC	1948	2008	78		United Kingdom
Sir Lynton Crosby AO	1956	2016	70		United Kingdom
Sir Daryl Dawson AC KBE CB KC	1933	1982	92		Australia
Sir William Deane AC KBE KC	1931	1982	95		Australia
Sir Scott Dixon KNZM	1980	2026	46		New Zealand
Professor Sir Peter Donnelly	1959	2019	67		United Kingdom
Sir Rod Eddington AO	1950	2005	76		United Kingdom
Sir Marc Feldmann AC	1944	2010	84		United Kingdom
Sir Trevor Garland KBE AM	1955	2010	71		Solomon Islands
Sir David Higgins	1954	2011	72		United Kingdom
Michael Hintze, Baron Hintze AM	1953	2013	73		United Kingdom; Made life peer in 2022.
Air Chief Marshal Sir Angus Houston AK AFC	1947	2015	79		Australia
Sir Arthur Llewellyn Jones OBE		2024			Papua New Guinea
Sir William Kearney CBE	1935	1982	91		Papua New Guinea
Sir Frank Lowy AC	1930	2017	95		United Kingdom
Sir Jonathan Mills AC	1963	2013	63		United Kingdom
Professor Sir Gustav Nossal AC CBE	1931	1977	95		Australia
Sir Bruce Saunders KBE	1941/1942	2012	83/84		Solomon Islands
Sir Pascal Soriot	1959	2022	67		United Kingdom
Sir Guy Weston	1960	2021	66		United Kingdom

Note 1: In 1981 as Prince of Wales, King Charles III was awarded a substantive knighthood of the Order of Australia (AK), despite not being an Australian (this required an amendment to the Constitution of the Order of Australia). He has been the Sovereign Head of the Order of Australia since his accession to the throne on 8 September 2022.

== See also ==
- Australian knights and dames, which includes both living and deceased persons
- Australian peers and baronets
- List of knights and dames of the Order of Australia
- Order of Australia
- Australian honours system
- Living New Zealand dames and knights
