= Leon Trout =

(1906–1978) Australian solicitor, businessman, and art collector

Sir Herbert Leon Trout (12 February 1906 – 6 March 1978) was an Australian solicitor, businessman and art collector.

He was born in Brisbane, Australia, to Walter John Trout, a butcher, and his wife Margaret Alice, née Storie. He qualified as a solicitor in 1928, and later qualified as an accountant. During the Second World War, he served in the Royal Australian Air Force in the Administrative and Special Duties Branch.

In 1950 he founded a law partnership, which grew to become one of Brisbane's leading law firms. In his later business career he held several company directorships and engaged in property development.

From 1953 to 1957 he was president of the Liberal Party of Australia, Queensland division, focusing on fundraising and candidate selection. He was knighted in 1959.

He was married to Peggy Elaine Hyland (26 July 1916 – 1988) from 1936 until his death. They had no children. With his wife he built a substantial art collection, which they kept in a gallery at Everton House in Everton Park, Queensland. A street nearby, Trouts Road, is named after them. They became the largest patrons of art in Queensland in the 1970s and 1980s. Trout was founding president of the Queensland National Gallery Society. Lady Trout died in 1988. In June 1989 the Australian works from the collection were auctioned by Christie's, raising over $7 million. Christie's had to fly in a large team of people to run the sale. The European works from the collection had been auctioned earlier in London, in April 1989.
