= List of knights and dames of the Order of Australia =

Badge of knights and dames of the Order of Australia

Knights and Dames of the Order of Australia was the highest level of the Order of Australia from 1976 to 1986 and 2014 to 2015.

== History ==
The Order of Australia is the only Australian order of chivalry, although certain dynastic British orders of chivalry, such as the Order of the Garter, the Order of the Thistle and the Royal Victorian Order, may still be awarded to Australians by the monarch of Australia. It was established on 14 February 1975 by Queen Elizabeth II on the recommendation of the Prime Minister of Australia, Gough Whitlam, to recognise Australian citizens and other persons for achievement, meritorious service, or both.

Recipients who are not Australian citizens may be appointed honorary knights or dames, although no such appointments have been made.

At its establishment, the Order of Australia included three grades: companion (AC), officer (AO) and member (AM), and two divisions: civil and military. On 24 May 1976, the grades of knight (AK) and dame (AD), and the Medal of the Order of Australia (OAM), were established by the monarch on the advice of Prime Minister Malcolm Fraser, and the Civil Division was renamed the General Division. Knight and Dame of the Order of Australia superseded Companion of the Order as the highest grade, however Knight and Dame were only awarded in the General Division of the Order. The then Governor-General, Sir John Kerr, reported to Sir Martin Charteris on 13 April 1976 that Malcolm Fraser wanted the level of knighthood to be "an extremely rare award" that would recognise "extraordinary and pre-eminent achievement and merit" and that no more than two would be made in any year. Sir Garfield Barwick, the then chairman of the Order of Australia Council, described such people as "super-knights" and Kerr thought the prospect of finding two each year "very slim".

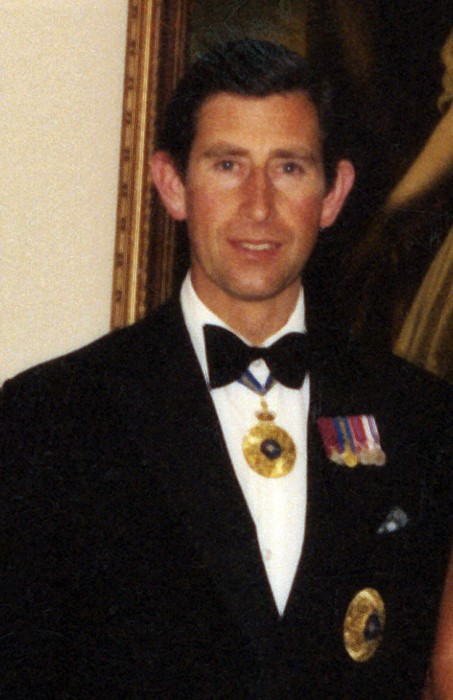
King Charles III (then Prince of Wales) wearing the insignia of a Knight of the Order of Australia, 1983

On 14 March 1981, the Queen co-signed letters patent amending the Constitution of the Order of Australia to create her son, the heir to the Australian throne, Charles, Prince of Wales, a knight of the Order of Australia. This procedure was necessary as Prince Charles, not being an Australian citizen, would not otherwise have qualified for a substantive knighthood and would have been eligible only for an honorary award.

Following the 1983 election, Prime Minister Bob Hawke recommended the abolition of the knight and dame grades. On 3 March 1986, the monarch co-signed letters patent revoking the categories of knight and dame – existing knights and dames were not affected by this change.

Following his election in 2013, Prime Minister Tony Abbott advised the Queen to reinstate the categories of dame and knight. On 19 March 2014, the Queen co-signed letters patent to bring this into effect, although no announcement of this change was made until 25 March. At that time, it was also announced that the governor-general would be the principal knight or dame of the order; the incumbent but outgoing governor-general, Quentin Bryce, was immediately made a dame of the order and the new governor-general, General Peter Cosgrove, became a knight immediately upon his swearing-in on 28 March.

On 7 January 2015, the Queen co-signed letters patent that created her consort, Prince Philip, Duke of Edinburgh, a knight of the Order of Australia on the same basis as applied to Prince Charles in 1981. This award was publicly announced in the Australia Day Honours list of 26 January 2015, along with the knighthood of Air Chief Marshal Angus Houston, former Chief of the Defence Force.

On 2 November 2015, Abbott's successor as prime minister, Malcolm Turnbull, announced that the categories of knight and dame in the Order of Australia would again be discontinued, although existing holders of the titles would not be affected. The Queen amended the Constitution of the Order by letters patent signed on 29 October and the amendment was gazetted on 22 December 2015.

== List of knights and dames ==
Name	Notability	Born	Awarded (Note: Date Awarded A = Australia Day List (26 January) Q = Queen's Birthday List (Second Monday in June) O = On assuming office as governor-general (or, in the cases of John Kerr and Quentin Bryce, on establishment / restoration of the grade of dame / knight).)	Died	Notes
KNIGHTS
Sir John Kerr AK, GCMG, GCVO, QC	Governor-General (1974–77); previously a Companion of the Order	24 September 1914	24 May 1976 O	24 March 1991	(Note: Sir John Kerr was the Governor-General and Principal Companion of the Order when the grade of Dame / Knight was established; his knighthood took effect immediately.)
Sir Robert Menzies KT, AK, CH, QC	Prime Minister (1939–41, 1949–66)	20 December 1894	7 June 1976 Q	15 May 1978	
Sir Colin Syme AK (Note: Colin Syme had previously been knighted as a Knight Bachelor, which carries no postnominal.)	Industrialist	22 April 1903	6 June 1977 Q	19 January 1986	
Sir Zelman Cowen AK, GCMG, GCVO, QC, PC	Governor-General (1977–82)	7 October 1919	8 December 1977 O	8 December 2011	
Sir Macfarlane Burnet OM, AK, KBE	Virologist, Nobel Prize laureate	3 September 1899	26 January 1978 A	31 August 1985	
Charles, Prince of Wales KG, KT, GCB, OM, AK, QSO, CC, CMM, CD, PC (Note: Ceased to be a knight upon becoming Sovereign Head of the Order)	Succeeded as King of Australia on 8 September 2022 and automatically became Sovereign Head of the Order of Australia.	14 November 1948	14 March 1981	living (age 78)	
Sir Roden Cutler VC, AK, KCMG, KCVO, CBE	Decorated soldier, diplomat, and longest-serving Governor of New South Wales (1966–81)	24 May 1916	7 April 1981	22 February 2002	
Sir Garfield Barwick AK, GCMG, QC	Attorney-General of Australia (1958–64); Minister for External Affairs (1961–64); Chief Justice of Australia (1964–81)	22 June 1903	8 June 1981 Q	14 July 1997	
Sir Charles Court AK, KCMG, OBE	Premier of Western Australia (1974–82)	29 September 1911	14 June 1982 Q	22 December 2007	
Sir Ninian Stephen KG, AK, GCMG, GCVO, KBE, PC, QC	High Court Judge (1972–82), Governor-General (1982–89)	15 June 1923	29 July 1982 O	29 October 2017	
Sir Roy Wright AK	Physiologist	7 August 1907	26 January 1983 A	28 February 1990	
Sir Gordon Jackson AK	Industrialist; previously a Companion of the Order	5 May 1924	13 June 1983 Q	1 June 1991	
General Sir Peter Cosgrove AK, CVO, MC	Chief of the Defence Force (2002–05), Governor-General (2014–19), also a Companion of the Order (Military Division)	28 July 1947	28 March 2014 O	living (age 79)	(Note: Gen. Cosgrove was previously a Companion of the Order in the Military Division prior to his appointment as Governor-General.)
Prince Philip, Duke of Edinburgh KG, KT, OM, AK, GCVO, GBE, ONZ, GCL, QSO, CC, CMM, CD, PC	Consort to the Queen of Australia, also a Companion of the Order (Military Division)	10 June 1921	7 January 2015 A	9 April 2021	(Note: Prince Philip was previously a Companion of the Order in the Military Division prior to his appointment. Like his son Prince Charles, Letters Patent amending the Constitution of the Order of Australia were required for him to become a substantive knight.)
Air Chief Marshal Sir Angus Houston AK, AFC	Chief of the Defence Force (2005–11), also a Companion of the Order (Military Division)	9 June 1947	26 January 2015 A	living (age 79)	
DAMES
Dame Alexandra Hasluck AD	Author, historian and vice-regal consort	26 August 1908	6 June 1978 Q	18 June 1993	
Dame Enid Lyons AD, GBE	First woman elected to the House of Representatives; first woman appointed to the federal Cabinet	9 July 1897	26 January 1980 A	2 September 1981	
Dame Quentin Bryce AD, CVO	Governor of Queensland (2003–08), Governor-General (2008–14); previously a Companion of the Order	23 December 1942	25 March 2014 O	living (age 83)	(Note: Quentin Bryce was the Governor-General and Principal Companion of the Order when the grade of Dame / Knight was re-established; her knighthood took effect immediately.)
Dame Marie Bashir AD, CVO	Governor of New South Wales (2001–14); previously a Companion of the Order	1 December 1930	9 June 2014 Q	20 January 2026	

== See also ==
- Australian knights and dames
- Living Australian knights and dames
- List of companions of the Order of Australia
