= William Williams (surgeon) =

Australian surgeon

Sir William Williams
- Born: 30 July 1856; Sydney, New South Wales
- Died: 10 May 1919 (aged 62); Caulfield, Victoria
- Burial place: Brighton General Cemetery
- Military career
- Allegiance: Australia
- Branch: New South Wales Military Forces; Australian Army
- Service years: 1883–1917
- Rank: Surgeon-General
- Commands: Director-General of Medical Services
- Conflicts: Mahdist War; Second Boer War; First World War
- Awards: Knight Commander of the Order of St Michael and St George; Companion of the Order of the Bath; Knight of Grace of the Order of St John of Jerusalem; Mentioned in Despatches (3)

Surgeon-General Sir William Daniel Campbell Williams, KCMG, CB, KStJ (30 July 1856 – 10 May 1919) was an Australian surgeon and military officer. He was surgeon general and Knight of Grace of the Order of St John of Jerusalem.

Williams was born in Sydney. He studied medicine at University College (M.R.C.S., 1879; L.R.C.P., 1880). In 1883, he was appointed staff surgeon of the New South Wales Artillery at the rank of captain. He reorganized the medical service in 1888 including to start the Permanent Medical Staff Corps. There he designed light ambulance wagons, which attracted notability in the Sudan and which were more advanced than those in the British Army.

Williams was promoted surgeon general and made a Companion of the Order of the Bath in January 1901. He served in the Australian Army Medical Corps in the First World War, for which he was made a Knight Commander of the Order of St Michael and St George in the 1916 Birthday Honours.
