= George Cartland =

Sir George Cartland CMG

Personal details
- Born: George Barrington Cartland; 22 September 1912
- Died: 31 July 2008 (aged 95)
- Education: Manchester University
- Occupation: Civil servant

Sir George Barrington Cartland, CMG (22 September 1912 – 31 July 2008) was the only deputy-governor of Uganda, in office from 1961 to 1962. After retiring, he became the vice-chancellor of the University of Tasmania.

== Early life ==
Cartland was born on 22 September 1912 to William Arthur and Margaret Cartland. His education took him to Manchester High School and Manchester University, where he studied for an honours degree in history.

== Colonial Service ==
After university he joined the Colonial Service and was sent to train at Hertford College, Oxford.

In 1935, Cartland was sent to his first posting on the Gold Coast, now called Ghana. As a cadet administrative officer he worked in the central secretariat until 1944. From there he was seconded back to London and home service at the Colonial Office.

At the Colonial Office Cartland worked in the African Studies Branch. In 1948, he was secretary of the London African Conference. Governors and other political leaders from Africa convened to discuss colonial policy and future independence as members of the Commonwealth.

In 1949, he was sent to Uganda to be an administrative secretary and stayed for the rest of his career. He became secretary for social services and local government as well as a member of the Executive Council in 1952. In 1955, he was appointed minister for social services. In 1958, he became minister of education and labour and chief secretary to the government in 1960. In this capacity, he made contributions towards the creation of the University of East Africa. Further to this he took interest in the growth of the University College of Makerere.

With the introduction of internal self-government in 1961, he became Uganda's first and last deputy-governor. In this capacity he was credited with helping to lay the groundwork for Ugandan independence.

== Retirement ==
In retirement, Cartland became registrar of Birmingham University. His work in this area also took on the executive committee of the Inter-University Council for Higher Education Overseas between 1963 and 1967. He was a member of the Commonwealth Scholarship Commission between 1964 and 1967.

In 1968, he moved to Tasmania to take up an appointment as vice-chancellor of the University of Tasmania. He worked in this position for the next decade and was awarded an honorary Doctor of Laws in recognition of his service. He was also deputy chair of the Australian Vice-Chancellors Committee between 1975 and 1977.

The Tasmanian government appointed him chair of the South-West National Park Advisory Committee (1976–77). He reviewed archives and library legislation (1977) and Tasmanian governmental administration (1979–81). In 1983, he was on the committee which examined the size of the Tasmanian parliament. His last role was as chair of the Tasmanian Council of Trade Unions Training Authority (1979–91).

== Personal life ==
He was married to Dorothy Rayton with whom he had two children, one of whom predeceased him. Cartland enjoyed fly fishing, sailing and mountaineering. He was a member of the Athenaeum Club in London as well as the Royal Commonwealth Society and joined the Tasmanian Club and the Royal Yacht Club of Tasmania. Cartland died on 31 July 2008 at the age of 95.
