= John Yocklunn =

Australian public servant (1933–2016)

Sir John Soong Chung Yocklunn KCVO (5 May 1933 – 7 April 2016) was a public servant who was National Librarian of Papua New Guinea during the 1970s.

== Early life and education ==
Yocklunn was born in China and arrived in Australia as a child.

He attended Perth Modern School and later Northam Senior High School. During the mid 1960s, Yocklunn served as president of the student association at the Australian National University.

In 1974, Yocklunn graduated with a master's degree in arts (MA) from the University of Sheffield.

== Working life ==
After joining the Australian Public Service, where he worked for the National Library of Australia, he moved to Papua New Guinea. He became National Librarian of the National Library of Papua New Guinea.

== Honours ==
Yocklunn was made a knight bachelor in 1975. He was made a knight commander of the Royal Victorian Order in 1977 for organising Queen Elizabeth's tour of Papua New Guinea.
