= John Atwill =

Australian lawyer and politician (1926–2001)

Sir John Atwill

President of the Liberal Party of Australia
- In office 1975–1982

Personal details
- Born: Milton John Napier Atwill; 16 January 1926
- Died: August 2001 (aged 75)
- Education: Cranbrook School, Sydney Geelong Grammar School Jesus College, Cambridge

Sir Milton John Napier Atwill (16 January 1926 – August 2001) was an Australian barrister, who was president of the Liberal Party of Australia between 1975 and 1982.

== Early life and military service ==
Atwill was born in 1926, the son of Milton Spencer Atwill and Isobel Caroline Cavaye. He was educated at Cranbrook School, Sydney, Geelong Grammar School and Jesus College, Cambridge. He served in the Royal Australian Air Force between 1944 and 1945. He had two daughters with his wife, Susan. His sister-in-law was the actress Wendy Playfair.

== Professional and political career ==
Atwill practised as a barrister between 1953 and 1973, being called to bar in New South Wales and a member of Gray's Inn.

He was treasurer of the NSW Division of the Liberal Party between 1989 and 1969, president 1970 to 1975 and federal president 1975 to 1982.

Atwill was knighted in 1978 in recognition of his service to commerce.

He died in August 2001.
