= Thomas B. Robinson =

Australian businessman and public servant (1853-1939)

Lieutenant-Colonel Sir Thomas B. Robinson GBE KCMG
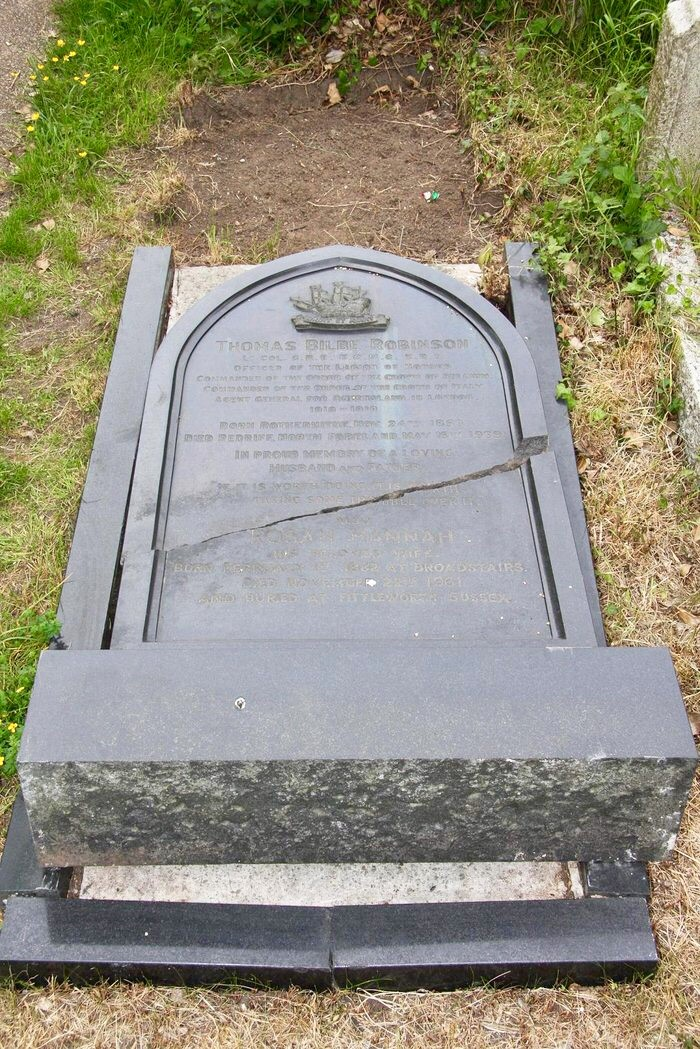
- The grave of Sir Thomas B. Robinson in the churchyard of St Peter's, Kent

Agent-General for Queensland in the United Kingdom
- In office 1910–1919

Personal details
- Born: Thomas Bilbe Robinson; 24 November 1853 Rotherhithe, London, England
- Died: 15 May 1939 (aged 85) England

Sir Thomas Bilbe Robinson (24 November 1853–15 May 1939) was an English-born Australian businessman and public servant.

Robinson was born in Rotherhithe, London, the son and grandson of shipbuilders. His father was Robert William Robinson and his mother was Frances Sarah, daughter of Thomas Bilbe. In 1881 he emigrated to Queensland and went into business, becoming involved in many companies. He also joined the Queensland Militia and rose to the rank of Major commanding the 1st Queenslanders and was later senior officer in Central Queensland.

In 1910 he returned to London as Agent-General for Queensland and served until his retirement at the end of 1919. During the First World War, the Board of Trade gave him the responsibility of procuring and distributing frozen meat to the Allied Forces. This job he carried out exceptionally well, and by the end of the war he had dealt with 3,500,000 tons of meat, the largest quantity that had been handled by a single organisation at any time in history to date. It was one commodity that the Allied Forces were never short of.

Robinson was knighted in 1910 shortly after his appointment as Agent-General, appointed Knight Commander of the Order of St Michael and St George (KCMG) in 1913, Knight Commander of the Order of the British Empire (KBE) in 1917, and Knight Grand Cross of the Order of the British Empire (GBE) in the 1920 Birthday Honours. He was also an Officer of the Légion d'Honneur (for his services as a commissioner of the Franco-British Exhibition), and a Commander of both the Order of the Crown of Belgium and the Order of the Crown of Italy.
