= Robert Crichton-Brown =

Australian businessman and yachtsman (1919–2013)

Sir Robert Crichton-Brown KCMG CBE TD
- Born: 23 August 1919; Melbourne, Victoria, Australia
- Died: 11 July 2013 (aged 93); London, England
- Other name: Bob Crichton-Brown
- Education: Sydney Grammar School
- Spouse: Nono (1941–2001)
- Military career
- Allegiance: United Kingdom
- Branch: British Army
- Service years: 1939–?
- Rank: Captain

Sir Robert Crichton-Brown KCMG CBE TD (23 August 1919 – 11 July 2013) was an Australian businessman best known as chairman of Rothmans International during the 1980s.

He was also Treasurer of the Liberal Party of Australia between 1974 and 1989. He was a keen yachtsman, competing in the Sydney to Hobart Yacht Race many times; he was the skipper of Pacha, handicap winner of the 1970 race. He was the National Chair for the Duke of Edinburgh's International Award - Australia from 1979 to 1984.

== Honours ==
Crichton-Brown was appointed a Commander of the Order of the British Empire (CBE) in 1970. He was made a Knight Bachelor in 1972, and made a Knight Commander of the Order of St Michael and St George (KCMG) in 1980.
