= Daikyo =

Japanese real estate company

Daikyo Incorporated (株式会社 大京, Kabushiki gaisha Daikyō) is a Japanese real estate company and one of the largest builders of condominiums in the country.
