= John Michael Higgins (businessman) =

Australian metallurgist

Sir John Higgins GCMG
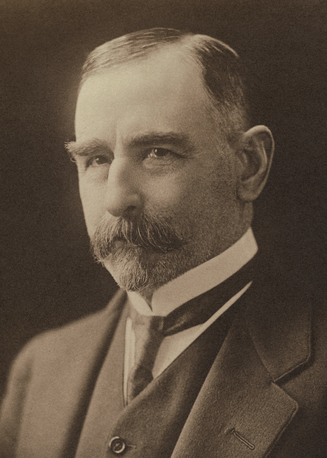
- Born: 9 December 1862; Castlemaine, Victoria, Australia
- Died: 6 October 1937 (aged 74); Toorak, Victoria, Australia
- Occupations: Metallurgist; Businessman
- Spouse: Frances Macgraith (m. 1909)

Sir John Michael "Bawra" Higgins GCMG (9 December 1862 – 6 October 1937) was an Australian metallurgist, businessman and political organiser.

== Early life ==
Higgins was born at Eureka Reef, Castlemaine, Victoria, the son of Enedor Stephens Higgins and his wife Elizabeth Jane, née Stephens, both Cornish. Higgins was educated at Rae's School, Sandhurst (now Bendigo) and at Bendigo High School. Afterwards he studied metallurgy and chemistry at the Bendigo School of Mines.

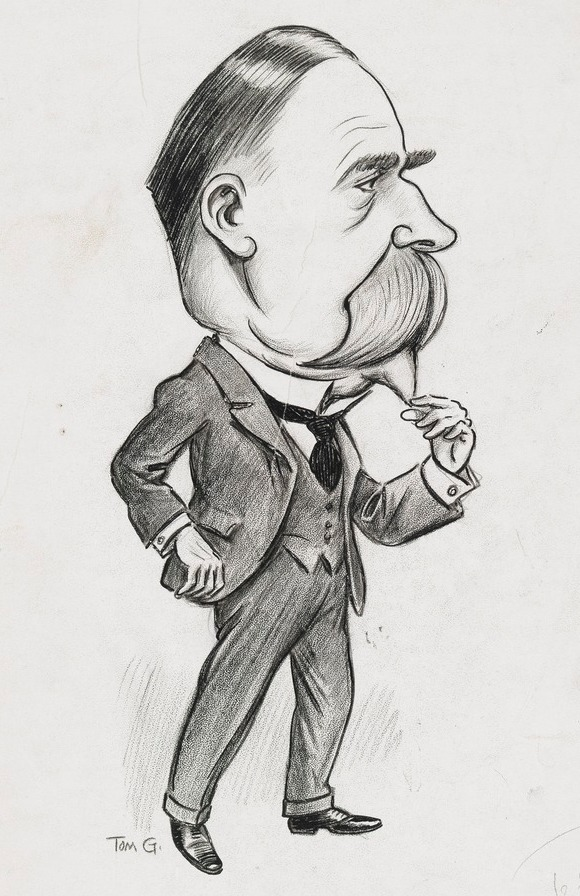
Caricature by Tom Glover, 1922

== Legacy ==
Grave of Sir John and Dame Frances at Box Hill Cemetery.

Sir John Higgins was married on 14 November 1889 to Frances Anna Maegraith/Magraith (1852-1932), later Dame Frances, the youngest daughter of Captain Robert Lovell Magraith (Maegraith; and Anna Balfour, of North Adelaide. Sir John Higgins and Frances Anna Higgins had no children. They lived at "Holyrood", Riverdale Rd, East Camberwell and later "Pentor", Toorak, Melbourne. Higgins was created KCMG in 1918 and GCMG in 1934.

Sir John Higgins was a wealthy philanthropist. He is remembered in the Higgins gallery of the Castlemaine Art Museum, a 1959 extension to the building to house his bequest of objects and artworks that was constructed partly from investments from a sum of £5,000 provided in 1942 by Catherine, his sister. The University of Melbourne promotes agriculture and veterinary science through the J. M. Higgins Research Foundation and the annual J. M. Higgins exhibition; the Royal Melbourne Institute of Technology's chemistry laboratory is named after Sir John and Lady Higgins.
