= William Henry Hall =

Captain William Henry Hall
- Born: 20 April 1842
- Died: 10 March 1895 (aged 52)
- Military career
- Allegiance: United Kingdom
- Branch: Royal Navy
- Rank: Captain
- Commands: Director of Naval Intelligence

Captain William Henry Hall (20 April 1842 – 10 March 1895) was the first Director of Naval Intelligence of the Royal Navy.

Hall was thought of highly by John A. Fisher, who had requested him to act as Commander in HMS Inflexible, which Fisher was to captain and which was under construction at the time. Hall had to decline the offer for private reasons. He was appointed to the Foreign Intelligence Committee in 1882, and became director of Naval Intelligence in 1887 when the Naval Intelligence Department was formed.

His son, William Reginald Hall, also became director of Naval intelligence in 1914.

== Bibliography ==
- Allen, Matthew (February 1995). "The Foreign Intelligence Committee and the Origins of the Naval Intelligence Department of the Admiralty". The Mariner's Mirror. 81 (1): 65–78. doi:10.1080/00253359.1995.10656533.
- James, Admiral Sir William (1955). The Eyes of the Navy: A Biographical Study of Admiral Sir Reginald Hall. London: Methuen & Co.

Military offices
Preceded by New Post	Director of Naval Intelligence; 1887–1889	Succeeded by Cyprian Bridge
