= Thomas Buckland =

Welsh footballer

Personal information
- Date of birth: 1870
- Place of birth: Bangor, Wales
- Date of death: 1932 (aged 61–62)
- Place of death: Pontypridd, Wales
- Position: Defender

Senior career*
Years	Team	Apps	(Gls)
1891–1904	Bangor City		

International career
1899	Wales	1	(0)
- * Club domestic league appearances and goals

Thomas J. Buckland (1870 — 1932) was a Welsh international footballer. During his career, he played 13 seasons for his hometown club Bangor, winning the Welsh Cup in 1896. He also gained one cap for the Wales national side in a match against England in 1899.

== Early life ==
Buckalnd was born in Bangor, Gwynedd, Wales, in 1870. His father worked as a shipping agent.

== Career ==
Buckland played club football for his hometown side Bangor, becoming a "stalwart" of the side for several years. He spent 13 seasons with the club and helped the side win the Welsh Cup in 1896, defeating Wrexham 3–1. In the Who's Who of Welsh International Soccer Players, Buckland was described as a hard-working player, he earned a reputation [...] as something of a "war horse"".

During his career, Buckland earned one cap for the Wales national football team. He replaced the injured Jack Jones in a 4–0 defeat to England on 20 March 1899 at Ashton Gate Stadium. Although described in one match report as "the pick of the half-backs", he never played for Wales again. He died in Pontypridd, South Wales in 1932 at the age of 63.

== See also ==
- List of Wales international footballers (alphabetical)
