= Colin Syme =

Australian businessman

Sir Colin Syme AK
- Born: 22 April 1903; Claremont, Western Australia
- Died: 19 January 1986 (aged 82); Howqua, Victoria, Australia
- Occupations: Lawyer, businessman
- Awards: Knight Bachelor; Knight of the Order of Australia

Sir Colin York Syme AK (22 April 1903 – 19 January 1986) was an Australian lawyer, businessman, technological innovator, and medical research administrator. He was noted as Chairman of BHP for nineteen years (1952–1971), and President of the Walter and Eliza Hall Institute of Medical Research for seventeen years (1961–1978).

== Career ==
Colin Syme studied in Perth, Melbourne and Sydney before joining the Melbourne legal firm of Hedderwick, Fookes and Alston in 1923. An articled clerk, Syme had ambitions to become a barrister, but after the premature death of Bruce Hedderwick in 1925, he accepted an offer to stay at the firm and was made a partner in 1928, remaining so until 1966.

Meanwhile, in 1937, he became a director of BHP and many of its subsidiaries, including Tubemakers of Australia, Australian Iron & Steel, Rylands Bros and the Commonwealth Aircraft Corporation. He was also a director of a number of other companies, including Imperial Chemical Industries of Australia and New Zealand, Elder Smith Goldsbrough Mort, the Private Investment Company for Asia, Mount Lyell Mining and Railway Company, National Australia Bank and the International Iron & Steel Institute.

In 1972, the federal government set up a committee under the Chairmanship of Sir Colin Syme to advise it on science and technology. It was known as the Syme Committee.

In 1973 he and Lance Townsend co-chaired an inquiry into Victorian health services, which produced findings widely known as the Syme-Townsend report, a major outcome of which was the creation of the Health Commission of Victoria.

Late in his career, he was President of the Walter and Eliza Hall Institute of Medical Research. When he retired from the latter position in 1978, the board established the Colin Syme Fellowship Fund, to nurture the career development of a talented young investigator within the Institute.

== Honours ==
On 8 June 1963, Colin Syme was made a Knight Bachelor. On 6 June 1977, he was appointed a Knight of the Order of Australia (AK), "for extraordinary and meritorious service to industry, particularly in the fields of research and technology".

He was the inaugural President of the Order of Australia Association, from January 1980 to January 1983.

He was an Honorary Doctor of Laws.

His portrait, painted by Judy Cassab, hangs in the National Portrait Gallery, Canberra.
