= Malcolm Ritchie =

Australian businessman & political activist (1894–1971)

Sir Malcolm Ritchie

Federal President of the Liberal Party of Australia
- In office 1949–1951
- Leader: Robert Menzies
- Preceded by: Richard Casey
- Succeeded by: William Anderson
- In office 1945–1947
- Leader: Robert Menzies
- Preceded by: New office
- Succeeded by: Richard Casey

Personal details
- Born: Thomas Malcolm Ritchie; 11 June 1894 Carlton, Victoria, Australia
- Died: 22 February 1971 (aged 76) Bong Bong, New South Wales, Australia
- Party: Liberal
- Education: Working Men's College, Melbourne
- Occupation: Electrical engineer, businessman

Sir Thomas Malcolm Ritchie (11 June 1894 – 22 February 1971) was an Australian businessman and political activist. He served as the inaugural federal president of the Liberal Party of Australia, in office from 1945 to 1947 and from 1949 to 1951. He was an electrical engineer by trade.

== Early life ==
Ritchie was born on 11 June 1894 in Carlton, Victoria. He was the son of Margaret (née Henry) and Thomas Ritchie. His mother was a tailor and his father, born in Scotland, was a tinsmith. Ritchie attended the Lee Street State School and then won a scholarship to the Working Men's College, Melbourne, where he studied mechanical and electrical engineering.

== Business career ==
Ritchie established his own company at the age of 21, "the first in Australia to manufacture heavy-duty electrical switchgear". He later formed partnerships with British and American companies, allowing him to "employ thousands of workers in four states". In 1934, he became general manager of Noyes Bros Pty Ltd, a Sydney-based manufacturer of radio sets and accessories. He eventually became the company's chairman and managing director, and also chaired the Australian subsidiary of Crompton Parkinson. Ritchie served on the New South Wales Electricity Advisory Committee from 1935 to 1946. During World War II, he was state business administrator of the Department of Munitions, for which he was knighted in 1951.

== Politics ==
Ritchie chaired the provisional executive of the Liberal Party of Australia in 1945 and was subsequently chosen as the inaugural federal president. He was replaced by Richard Casey in 1947, but when Casey returned to parliament in 1949 he was elected to a second term. He resigned in 1951 due to ill health. In the early days of the party Ritchie helped raise funds to finance the federal secretariat and helped convince the Queensland People's Party to affiliate to the new party. He came into conflict with the party's inaugural leader Robert Menzies over the influence of business within the party and the role of the organisational wing in making policy.

In 1976, the Labor Party publicised a statutory declaration made by a former Liberal activist, John Keegan, regarding fundraising during the 1951 federal election. Keegan alleged that Ritchie had sent a letter to "prominent British companies and industrialists" appealing for funds to be donated to the Liberal Party, and succeeded in raising almost £100,000. Robert Menzies, who was also implicated in the declaration, released a statement that he had never met Keegan and that the Liberal Party had never accepted funds from overseas.

== Personal life ==
Ritchie married Phyllis Elizabeth Brown in 1924. In retirement he established a Polled Hereford stud on his property at Bong Bong, where he also built a bowling green. He died at his home on 22 February 1971, aged 76.
