= William Kearney (judge) =

Australian judge (born 1935)

Sir William John Francis Kearney, CBE (born 8 January 1935) is a retired Australian judge who served on the supreme courts of Papua New Guinea and the Northern Territory in Australia.

== Career ==
William Kearney was born on 8 January 1935, to William John Kilbeg Kearney and Gertrude Ivylene Huston. He graduated in law from the University of Sydney and University College London. He worked as a solicitor in New South Wales from 1959 before moving to Papua New Guinea (at that time a territory of Australia) in 1963, where he was a barrister and solicitor with the Papua New Guinea Government Legal Services from 1963 to 1972. He was an official member of the House of Assembly of Papua and New Guinea and Executive Council from 1972 to 1973 and the Secretary of Law from 1972 to 1975. He held a dormant commission as High Commissioner of Papua New Guinea from 1973 to 1975 and as Administrator in 1973.

Kearney was a member of the Supreme Court of Papua New Guinea from 1976 to 1982. In 1976 he was appointed a Commander of the Order of the British Empire (CBE), on the recommendation of the Papua New Guinea government, for his services to the law in that country. He was Chairman of the Parliamentary Salaries Tribunal from 1977–82, and Deputy Chief Justice 1980–82. He was knighted as a Knight Batchelor in 1982 for services to law in Papua New Guinea, again on the recommendation of the Papua New Guinea government.

In 1982 Kearney was appointed a Justice of the Supreme Court of the Northern Territory, serving until 1999. He was also Aboriginal Land Commissioner from 1982 to 1987, and chairman of the Northern Territory Law Reform Committee from 1982 to 1990. During his time as Commissioner, he had a prominent role in the Kenbi Land Claim. At the time of his retirement, he was the third-longest serving resident judge on the Northern Territory's Supreme Court.

Kearney was Deputy to the Administrator of the Northern Territory at the opening of the Parliament of the Northern Territory (7th Legislative Assembly) on 27 June 1994.

From 1995 to 1998, Kearney was an acting judge of the Supreme Court of New South Wales under an exchange agreement.

Kearney married Jessie, a social worker and President of the Australia China Friendship Society. Jessie was born in Shanghai, and stood as a Green Independent in 1990 and was known for her work on the Australia-China council.
