= Electoral results for the district of Bondi =

Election results for Bondi, New South Wales, Australia

Bondi, an electoral district of the Legislative Assembly in the Australian state of New South Wales has had two incarnations, from 1913 to 1920 and from 1927 until 1971.

First incarnation (1913–1920)
Election	Member	Party
1913	James Macarthur-Onslow	Liberal Reform
1917	James Macarthur-Onslow	Nationalist
Second incarnation (1927–1971)
Election	Member	Party
1927	Harold Jaques	Nationalist
1930	Abe Landa	Labor
1932	Norman Thomas	United Australia
1935	Norman Thomas	United Australia
1938	Norman Thomas	United Australia
1941	Abe Landa	Labor
1944	Abe Landa	Labor
1947	Abe Landa	Labor
1950	Abe Landa	Labor
1953	Abe Landa	Labor
1956	Abe Landa	Labor
1959	Abe Landa	Labor
1962	Abe Landa	Labor
1965	Abe Landa	Labor
1965 by	Syd Einfeld	Labor
1968	Syd Einfeld	Labor

== Election results ==
=== Elections in the 1960s ===
==== 1968 ====
1968 New South Wales state election: Bondi
Party	Candidate	Votes	%	±%
Labor	Syd Einfeld	12,054	54.8	+2.9
Liberal	James Markham	9,938	45.2	−2.9
Total formal votes		21,992	97.0	
Informal votes		689	3.0	
Turnout		22,681	93.0	
Labor hold		Swing	+2.9	

==== 1965 by-election ====
1965 Bondi by-election Saturday 6 November
Party	Candidate	Votes	%	±%
Labor	Syd Einfeld	10,110	49.9	−3.7
Liberal	John Barraclough	9,579	47.3	+0.9
Democratic Labor	William Slowgrove	493	2.4	
Independent	Albert Rietschel	76	0.4	
Total formal votes		20,258	96.5	−1.3
Informal votes		732	3.5	+1.3
Turnout		20,990	86.8	−5.5
After distribution of preferences
Labor	Syd Einfeld	10,167	50.2	
Liberal	John Barraclough	9,588	47.3	
Democratic Labor	William Slowgrove	503	2.5	
Labor hold		Swing	N/A	

- Preferences were not distributed to completion.
- Abe Landa (Labor) resigned to accept the position of Agent-General for New South Wales in London.

==== 1965 ====
1965 New South Wales state election: Bondi
Party	Candidate	Votes	%	±%
Labor	Abe Landa	11,978	53.6	−5.6
Liberal	John Barraclough	10,356	46.4	+5.6
Total formal votes		22,334	97.8	−0.7
Informal votes		492	2.2	+0.7
Turnout		22,826	92.3	−0.4
Labor hold		Swing	−5.6	

==== 1962 ====
1962 New South Wales state election: Bondi
Party	Candidate	Votes	%	±%
Labor	Abe Landa	13,898	59.2	+5.8
Liberal	Carl Jeppesen	9,575	40.8	−1.6
Total formal votes		23,473	98.5	
Informal votes		363	1.5	
Turnout		23,836	92.7	
Labor hold		Swing	+5.2	

=== Elections in the 1950s ===
==== 1959 ====
1959 New South Wales state election: Bondi
Party	Candidate	Votes	%	±%
Labor	Abe Landa	10,713	50.4	
Liberal	Carl Jeppesen	9,660	45.4	
Democratic Labor	Charles Massey	881	4.2	
Total formal votes		21,254	98.0	
Informal votes		429	2.0	
Turnout		21,683	93.3	
Two-party-preferred result
Labor	Abe Landa	10,889	51.2	
Liberal	Carl Jeppesen	10,365	48.8	
Labor hold		Swing		

==== 1956 ====
1956 New South Wales state election: Bondi
Party	Candidate	Votes	%	±%
Labor	Abe Landa	11,263	54.6	−5.0
Liberal	Daniel Sutherland	9,360	45.4	+5.0
Total formal votes		20,623	98.3	+0.3
Informal votes		353	1.7	−0.3
Turnout		20,976	92.9	−0.4
Labor hold		Swing	−5.0	

==== 1953 ====
1953 New South Wales state election: Bondi
Party	Candidate	Votes	%	±%
Labor	Abe Landa	12,904	59.6	
Liberal	Leslie Fingleton	8,757	40.4	
Total formal votes		21,661	98.0	
Informal votes		446	2.0	
Turnout		22,107	93.3	
Labor hold		Swing		

==== 1950 ====
1950 New South Wales state election: Bondi
Party	Candidate	Votes	%	±%
Labor	Abe Landa	12,179	52.0	
Liberal	Keith Weekes	11,255	48.0	
Total formal votes		23,434	98.7	
Informal votes		314	1.3	
Turnout		23,748	92.4	
Labor hold		Swing		

=== Elections in the 1940s ===
==== 1947 ====
1947 New South Wales state election: Bondi
Party	Candidate	Votes	%	±%
Labor	Abe Landa	12,148	49.2	+5.6
Liberal	William McNally	10,488	42.4	+12.6
Lang Labor	Elizabeth Frewin	2,080	8.4	−6.4
Total formal votes		24,716	98.2	+3.1
Informal votes		442	1.8	−3.1
Turnout		25,158	93.5	+0.9
Two-party-preferred result
Labor	Abe Landa	13,454	54.4	+3.3
Liberal	William McNally	11,262	45.6	−3.3
Labor hold		Swing	+3.3	

==== 1944 ====
1944 New South Wales state election: Bondi
Party	Candidate	Votes	%	±%
Labor	Abe Landa	9,521	43.6	−1.5
Democratic	Frank Browne	6,505	29.8	−14.4
Lang Labor	Leslie Hallett	3,241	14.8	+14.8
Liberal Democratic	Alexander Stewart	2,465	11.3	+11.3
Independent Labor	Alfred Rosen	126	0.6	+0.6
Total formal votes		21,858	95.1	−3.4
Informal votes		1,116	4.9	+3.4
Turnout		22,974	92.6	+1.1
Two-party-preferred result
Labor	Abe Landa	11,164	51.1	−3.1
Democratic	Frank Browne	10,694	48.9	+3.1
Labor hold		Swing	−3.1	

==== 1941 ====
1941 New South Wales state election: Bondi
Party	Candidate	Votes	%	±%
Labor	Abe Landa	9,577	45.1	
United Australia	Norman Thomas	9,373	44.2	
State Labor	Allan Jenkins	2,267	10.7	
Total formal votes		21,217	98.5	
Informal votes		327	1.5	
Turnout		21,544	91.5	
Two-party-preferred result
Labor	Abe Landa	11,492	54.2	
United Australia	Norman Thomas	9,725	45.8	
Labor gain from United Australia		Swing		

=== Elections in the 1930s ===
==== 1938 ====
1938 New South Wales state election: Bondi
Party	Candidate	Votes	%	±%
United Australia	Norman Thomas	12,223	52.3	−11.5
Labor	Henry Collins	5,946	25.4	−10.8
Independent	Thomas Hogan	4,357	18.6	+18.6
Independent	Richard Brown	851	3.6	+3.6
Total formal votes		23,377	98.0	−0.3
Informal votes		474	2.0	+0.3
Turnout		23,851	95.8	−0.2
United Australia hold		Swing	N/A	

- Preferences were not distributed.

==== 1935 ====
1935 New South Wales state election: Bondi
Party	Candidate	Votes	%	±%
United Australia	Norman Thomas	12,978	63.8	+1.6
Labor (NSW)	Jack Fitzpatrick	7,374	36.2	+3.7
Total formal votes		20,352	98.3	+0.3
Informal votes		346	1.7	−0.3
Turnout		20,698	96.0	−0.2
United Australia hold		Swing	N/A	

==== 1932 ====
1932 New South Wales state election: Bondi
Party	Candidate	Votes	%	±%
United Australia	Norman Thomas	12,132	62.2	+19.4
Labor (NSW)	Abe Landa	6,330	32.5	−15.0
Federal Labor	James Buckingham	684	3.5	+3.5
Womens	Grace Scobie	233	1.2	+1.2
Communist	Archibald Smith	109	0.6	+0.6
Total formal votes		19,488	98.0	−0.7
Informal votes		387	2.0	+0.7
Turnout		19,875	96.2	+3.8
United Australia gain from Labor (NSW)		Swing	N/A	

- Preferences were not distributed.

==== 1930 ====
1930 New South Wales state election: Bondi
Party	Candidate	Votes	%	±%
Labor	Abe Landa	8,725	47.5	
Nationalist	Harold Jaques (defeated)	7,859	42.8	
Australian	Ashton Kurts	1,795	9.8	
Total formal votes		18,379	98.7	
Informal votes		242	1.3	
Turnout		18,621	92.4	
Two-party-preferred result
Labor	Abe Landa	9,592	52.2	
Nationalist	Harold Jaques	8,787	47.8	
Labor gain from Ind. Nationalist		Swing		

Sitting member Harold Jaques had won the 1927 election as an independent nationalist but rejoined the Nationalist party.

=== Elections in the 1920s ===
==== 1927 ====
1927 New South Wales state election: Bondi
Party	Candidate	Votes	%	±%
Ind. Nationalist	Harold Jaques	7,692	53.5	
Nationalist	Millicent Preston-Stanley (defeated)	3,408	23.7	
Labor	Susan Francis	3,278	22.8	
Total formal votes		14,378	97.9	
Informal votes		310	2.1	
Turnout		14,688	84.8	
Ind. Nationalist win		(new seat)		

Both Harold Jaques and Millicent Preston-Stanley were Nationalist members for Eastern Suburbs and Preston-Stanley won Nationalist pre-selection. Jaques re-joined the Nationalist party after the election.

District recreated

==== 1920 - 1927 ====
District abolished

=== Elections in the 1910s ===
==== 1917 ====
1917 New South Wales state election: Bondi
Party	Candidate	Votes	%	±%
Nationalist	James Macarthur-Onslow	unopposed		
Nationalist hold				

==== 1913 ====
1913 New South Wales state election: Bondi
Party	Candidate	Votes	%	±%
Liberal Reform	James Macarthur-Onslow	4,567	55.7	
Labor	George Moxon	1,995	24.3	
Independent Liberal	Frank Farnell	1,638	20.0	
Total formal votes		8,200	98.2	
Informal votes		146	1.8	
Turnout		8,346	63.7	
Liberal Reform win		(new seat)		
