= Agent-general =

Government representative of certain Commonwealth countries in the UK

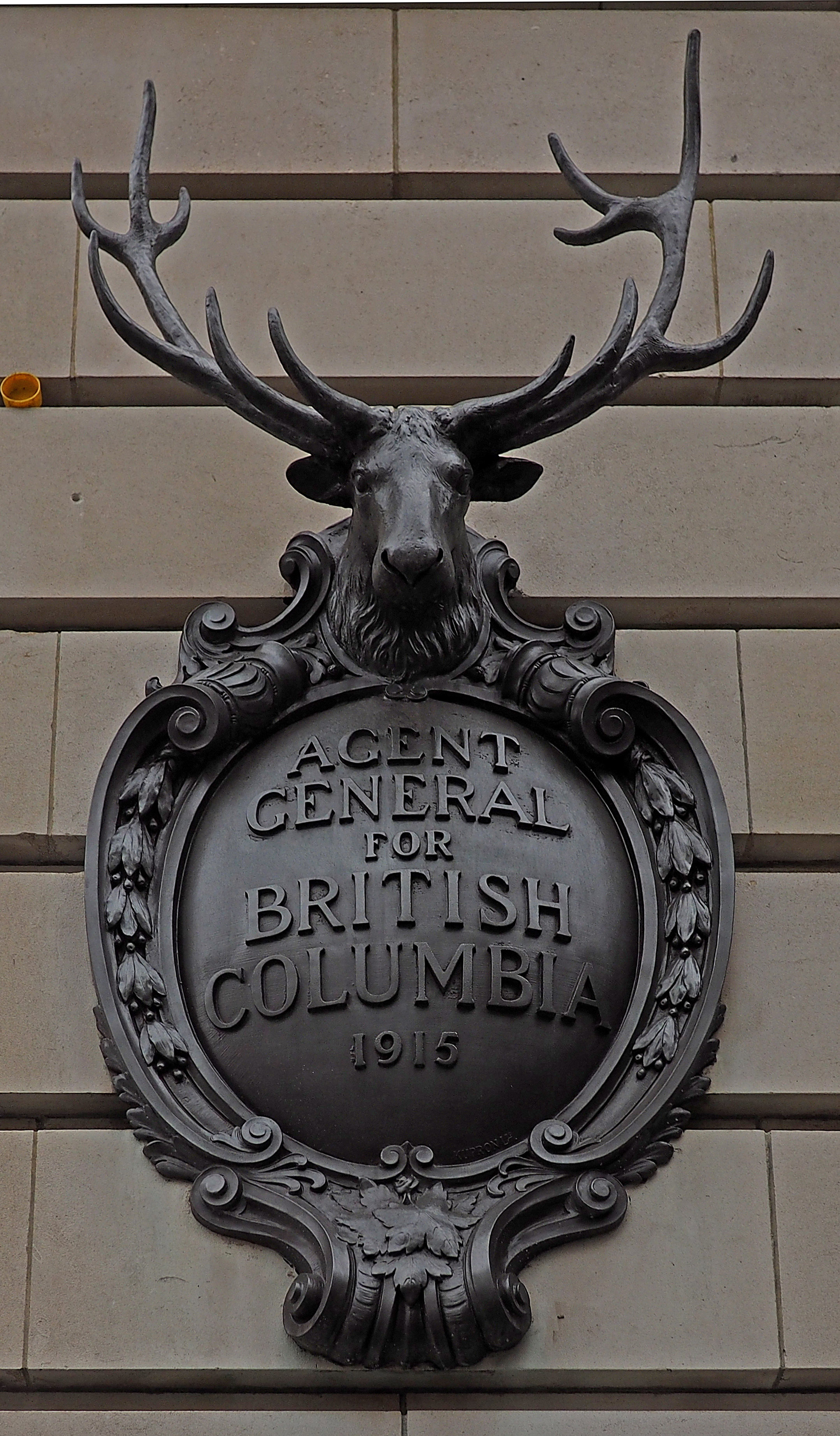
The plaque of the Agent General for British Columbia in London

An agent-general (French: délégué général or déléguée générale, masculine and feminine respectively) is the representative in cities abroad of the government of a Canadian province or an Australian state and, historically, also of a British colony in Jamaica, Nigeria, Canada, Malta, South Africa, Australia or New Zealand and subsequently, of a Nigerian region. Australia's and Canada's federal governments are represented by high commissions, as are all Commonwealth national governments today.

In the 18th and 19th centuries, a growing number of British colonies appointed agents in Great Britain and Ireland and occasionally elsewhere in Europe to promote immigration to the colonies. Eventually, agents-general were appointed by some colonies to represent their commercial, legal, and diplomatic interests in Britain and to the British government and Whitehall. They were appointed, and their expenses and salaries provided, by the governments of the colonies they represented.

Starting in 1886, Quebec and the federal Canadian government also appointed agents-general to Paris. The first, Hector Fabre, was dispatched by the province of Quebec but was asked by the federal government to represent all of Canada. He and his successor, Philippe Roy, continued to represent both Quebec City and Ottawa in France until 1912 when the federal government asked Roy to resign his Quebec position to avoid conflicts of interest. Canadian provinces have also appointed agents-general (called delegates-general by Quebec beginning in the 1970s) to other countries and major cities.

Following a military coup in Nigeria in 1966, the federal system was abolished, and the posts of the agents-general of Nigerian regions in London were subsumed in the Nigerian High Commission.

By the 1990s, some Australian state governments regarded the office of their agent-general in London as a costly anachronism, even for promoting tourism and investment, and have since been closed and subsumed into the Australian High Commission. The majority of Australian states continue to have agents-general in London, but operate from Australia House rather than maintain separate premises.

Many Canadian provinces similarly are no longer represented by an agent-general, although Quebec continues to have a Government Office in London (Délégation générale du Québec à Londres) and in several other cities around the world. Ontario, Alberta, Saskatchewan, and Manitoba have representatives who work out of the Canadian Embassy in Washington, DC.

== Diplomatic and legal status ==
=== Status in the United Kingdom ===
In the United Kingdom, agents-general of Australia and Canada (and their staff) are granted the same diplomatic privileges and immunities held under international law by virtue of the Consular Relations Act 1968; this privilege is granted under the Commonwealth Countries and Republic of Ireland (Immunities and Privileges) Order 1985 (SI 1985/1983), these privileges including the right to freedom from arrest and exemption of duties and taxes. Agents-general of other countries are not afforded these privileges.

=== Status in Australian, Canadian and international law ===
With the exception of the diplomatic status afforded to agents-general by the British government, under international law, agents-general do not have any diplomatic or legal status, privileges or immunities, however, Australian agents-general may be granted the privilege of a diplomatic passport, while Canadian agents-general may be granted the privilege of an official passport. The passport status of an agent-general, or his or her staff, in the United Kingdom does not affect the diplomatic privileges and immunities afforded by the British government.

== Australia ==
In the Australian colonies and Province of South Australia, prior to each achieving responsible government, each was represented in the United Kingdom by the Colonial Agent. The position was appointed by the British Secretary of State for the Colonies to work within the Office of the Crown Agents for the Colonies; each colony was represented by the same Agent, Edward Barnard, who was not appointed or paid by the colonies.

Growing dissatisfaction among colonial governments led, following each colony and province achieving responsible government, to the appointment of individual Agents-General appointed by the relevant colonial government to represent their interest to the Crown and Empire.

South Australia was the first Australian colonial government to appoint an Agent-General, with Gregory Seale Walters taking the post in January 1859. Most Australian states continue to maintain Agents-General in London.

=== Agents-general for South Australia ===
The Agent-General for South Australia is the official representative of the State of South Australia to the United Kingdom. The position is a quasi-diplomatic representative responsible for representing the State to the Crown and promoting South Australia's trade and economic interests in the United Kingdom and Europe. In 1858, South Australia was the first Australian colonial government to appoint an Agent-General.

Whilst the national interests of Australia are now represented by the Australian High Commissioner to the United Kingdom, South Australia maintains the role of Agent-General to:

- Encourage European companies to invest in South Australia;
- Seek opportunities and provide support for the export of South Australian products and services to Europe;
- Assist South Australian investors seeking investment opportunities in Europe;
- Encourage people to move to South Australia under the Skilled and Business Migration Schemes;
- Assist the State's Tourism Commission in attracting tourists to South Australia.

The Office of the Agent-General also assists in the:

- Promotion of South Australia, particularly in investment attraction, trade development and as a destination for business migrants and European tourists;
- Support and assistance to Ministers and government officials visiting the region;
- Work with South Australian businesses, industry associations and other agencies in establishing contacts in Europe to increase trade, financial and commercial activities of benefit to the State of South Australia; and
- Providing assistance in planning and preparing trade and investment missions from Europe to South Australia.

In 2015, the then Agent-General and advertising executive, Bill Muirhead established the South Australia Club in London as a means for South Australian expats and businesses to network with British and European businesses to leverage South Australia's trade and tourism opportunities. Since 2015, the club has grown across many countries around the world; with hopes of expanding further in the future.

=== Agents-general for New South Wales ===
The New South Wales Office in London was one of several overseas offices established by the colonies of Australia to represent their interests. The London Office was established after the appointment of the first Agent-General on 1 May 1864. In June 1932, the Agent-General's Office was abolished as a cost-cutting measure and was replaced by the New South Wales Government Offices, London, to be headed by an "Official Representative". The title was renamed Agent-General in 1937, but was left vacant from 1939 to 1946 due to the Second World War. From 1972 to 1993, the Agent-General's Office was located in separate premises from Australia House, at the nearby address of 66 The Strand, which was opened by Queen Elizabeth II in May 1972.

In October 1992, the position of NSW Agent-General in London was abolished by the Fahey government. This occurred following an expenses scandal by the last Agent-General, Neil Pickard, who had been appointed as a consolation for losing his seat in parliament. Following its abolition, Fahey noted to Parliament: "It was abundantly clear to me, to all Cabinet and to all Government that we no longer needed an agent-general's office in London. That was a throwback to colonial days – to the days when it was important to have garden parties and to participate in ceremonies. Quite frankly, little or no benefit accrued to New South Wales by participating in such a process." The Agent-General's Office was replaced by the NSW Government Trade and Investment Office, London, which had no ceremonial function, but focused on the promotion of investment and trade in the UK and Europe. The NSW Government of Gladys Berejiklian considered reviving the Agent-General position in late-2019, noting that "We know the post-Brexit environment is going to be very different and NSW can gain a lot of opportunities in business from the UK".

The position was revived in 2021, with an expanded remit to additionally cover Europe and Israel.

List of agents-general
Agents-general	Term start	Term end	Time in office	Notes
William Mayne	10 November 1864	1871	6 years	
Charles Cowper	6 December 1870	19 October 1875	4 years, 317 days	
William Forster	8 February 1876	7 October 1879	3 years, 241 days	
Alexander Stuart	25 November 1879	April 1880	142 days	
Sir Saul Samuel	11 August 1880	1 October 1897	17 years, 51 days	
Sir Daniel Cooper, Bt	1 October 1897	27 March 1899	1 year, 177 days	
Sir Julian Salomons	27 March 1899	14 May 1900	1 year, 48 days	
Henry Copeland	14 May 1900	18 July 1903	3 years, 65 days	
The Earl of Jersey	18 July 1903	1 April 1905	1 year, 257 days	
Sir Timothy Coghlan	1 April 1905	26 May 1915	10 years, 55 days	
Bernhard Wise	26 May 1915	21 September 1916	1 year, 118 days	
Sir Timothy Coghlan	21 September 1916	2 May 1917	223 days	
Sir Charles Wade	2 May 1917	15 March 1920	2 years, 318 days	
David Hall	17 March 1920	6 May 1920	50 days	
Sir Timothy Coghlan	6 May 1920	20 April 1925	4 years, 349 days	
Sir Arthur Cocks	20 April 1925	21 September 1925	154 days	
Sir Timothy Coghlan	21 September 1925	30 April 1926	221 days	
Edward McTiernan (acting)	2 May 1926	14 June 1926	43 days	
The Viscount Chelmsford	14 June 1926	14 April 1928	1 year, 305 days	
Sir George Fuller	14 April 1928	14 April 1931	3 years, 0 days	
Albert Willis	14 April 1931	30 July 1932	1 year, 107 days	
Albert Heath (Official Representative)	15 February 1934	26 January 1937	2 years, 346 days	
Albert Heath	26 January 1937	27 May 1938	1 year, 121 days	
Clifford Hay	20 June 1938	November 1939	1 years	
Jack Tully	1 June 1946	1 July 1954	8 years, 30 days	
Francis Buckley	1 July 1954	24 September 1965	11 years, 85 days	
Abe Landa	24 September 1965	5 November 1970	5 years, 42 days	
Sir John Pagan	5 November 1970	18 January 1973	2 years, 74 days	
Sir Davis Hughes	18 January 1973	December 1977	4 years	
Peter Valkenburg	18 January 1978	April 1980	2 years	
Jack Renshaw	April 1980	January 1983	2 years	
Reginald Watson	January 1983	March 1986	3 years	
Kevin Stewart	March 1986	February 1989	2 years	
Norman Brunsdon	February 1989	August 1991	2 years	
Neil Pickard	16 September 1991	4 March 1993	1 year, 169 days	
Stephen Cartwright OAM	1 October 2021	28 June 2023	1 year, 270 days	

=== Agents-general for Queensland ===
Agent-general	Years
John Douglas	1869–1870
Archibald Archer	1870–1872
Richard Daintree	1872–1876
Arthur Macalister	1876–1881
Thomas Archer	1881–1885
William Hemmant (acting)	1885–1885
Sir James Garrick	1885–1888
Thomas Archer	1888–1890
Sir James Garrick	1890–1895
Charles Shortt Dicken (acting)	2 October 1895 – 31 October 1895
Sir Thomas McIlwraith (acting)	31 October 1895 – 25 November 1896
Sir Henry Wylie Norman	1896–1897
Charles Shortt Dicken (acting)	29 December 1897 – 1898
Sir Horace Tozer	2 March 1898 – 1909
Thomas Bilbe Robinson	1910–1919
John McEwan Hunter	1 January 1920 – 1922
John Arthur Fihelly	8 February 1922–1924
John Huxham	1 August 1924 – 31 July 1929
Edward Henry Macartney	1 August 1929 – 14 August 1931
Leonard Henry Pike	14 August 1931 – 30 September 1951
Sir David Muir	3 October 1951 – 9 January 1964
Sir William Summerville	1 April 1964 – 1970
Sir Peter Delamothe	1971–1973
N. C. Sweeney (acting)	1973–1974
Sir Wallace Rae	6 December 1974–1980
G. W. Swan (acting)	August 1980 – March 1981
John H. Andrews	April 1981 – September 1984
John F. S. Brown	September 1984 – March 1988
Tom McVeigh	April 1988 – January 1991
Ray T. Anderson	June 1991 – September 1995
Dermot McManus	February 1996 – October 2000
Ray Kelly (acting)	October 2000 – April 2001
John Dawson	April 2001 – September 2007
Ross Buchanan (acting)	October 2007 – April 2008
Andrew Hugh Craig	April 2008 – June 2011
Ken Smith	July 2011 – May 2017
Linda Apelt	20 July 2017 – March 2021
David Stewart	15 March 2021 - present

=== Agents-general for Tasmania ===
- Hon Adye Douglas (later Sir, Kt), 1886–1887
- Sir Arthur Blyth (acting), 1887–1888
- James Arndell Youl CMG (later Sir, KCMG) (acting), 1888
- Hon Edward Braddon, (later Right Hon Sir, PC KCMG), 1888–1893
- Sir Robert Herbert, 1893–1896
- Sir Andrew Clarke (acting), 1896
- Sir Westby Perceval, 1896–1898
- Sir Andrew Clarke (acting), 1898–1899
- Hon Sir Philip Oakley Fysh, KCMG, 1899–1901
- Sir Andrew Clarke (acting), 1901
- Hon Alfred Dobson, CMG, 1901–1908
- Sir John McCall, KCMG, Kt., 1909–1919
- Alfred Henry Ashbolt (later Sir, Kt), 1919–1924
- Lieut.-Colonel R. Eccles Snowden (later Sir, Kt), 1924–1930
- Darcy W. Addison, CMG, ISO, MVO, 1930–1931
- Herbert W. Ely, ISO (acting), 1931–1937
- Hon Sir Claude Ernest Weymouth James, Kt, 1937–1950
- Sir Eric E. von Bibra, Kt, OBE 1950–1958
- Hon Sir Alfred J White, Kt 1959–1971
- Royce R. Neville, 1971–1978
- Hon Bill Neilson AC, 1978–1981

=== Agents-general for Victoria ===
- Hugh Culling Eardley Childers, 1857–1858
- Charles Pasley, 1864–1867 (acting)
- George Frederic Verdon, 1867–1872
- Hugh Culling Eardley Childers, 1872–1873
- James McCulloch, 1873 (acting from January to April)
- Archibald Michie, 1873–1879
- Charles Pasley, 1880–1882 (acting)
- Robert Murray Smith, 1882–1886
- Graham Berry, 1886–1891
- James Munro, 1892–1893
- Duncan Gillies, 1893–1897
- Andrew Clarke, 1897–1902 (and for Tasmania)
- John William Taverner, 1903–1913
- Peter McBride, 1913–1922
- John McWhae, 1922–1924
- George Fairbairn, 1924–1927
- Walter Leitch, 1929–1933
- Richard Linton, 1933–1936
- Murray Bourchier, 1936–1937
- Albert Louis Bussau, 1938–1944
- Norman Angus Martin, 1945–1950
- John Henry Lienhop, 1950–1956
- William Watt Leggatt, 1956– 1964
- Sir Horace Petty, 1964–1969
- Sir Murray Porter, 1970–1976
- Sir John Rossiter 1976–1979
- The Hon Joseph Anstice Rafferty 1979–1983
- Ian Haig, 1983–1985
- Kenneth Andrew Finnin, 1985–1988
- Ian Haig, 1988–1989
- Ken Crompton, 1993–1996
- Alan Brown, 1996–2000
- Peter Hansen, 2000–2004
- David Buckingham, 2004–2009
- Sally Capp, 2009–2012
- Geoffrey Conaghan, 2013–2016
- Ken Ryan AM, 2017–2020
- Tim Dillon, 2020–present

=== Agents-general for Western Australia ===
- Hon Septimus Burt KC, 1891–1892 (Acting)
- Hon Sir Malcolm Fraser, 1892–1898
- Hon Sir Edward Wittenoom, 1898–1901
- Hon Sir Henry Lefroy, 1901–1904
- Hon Sir Walter James, 1904–1907
- Hon Sir Cornthwaite Rason, 1907–1911
- Hon Sir Newton Moore, 1911–1917
- Hon Sir James Connolly, 1917–1923
- Hon Sir Hal Colebatch, 1923–1927
- Hon William Angwin, 1927–1933
- Hon Sir Hal Colebatch, 1933–1939
- Hon Michael Troy, 1939–1947
- Hon William Kitson, 1947–1952
- Hon James Dimmitt, 1953–1957
- Hon Ernest Hoar, 1957–1965
- Hon Gerald Wild, 1965–1971
- Hon Sir Stewart Bovell, 1971–1974
- Jim Richards, 1975–1978
- Les Slade, 1978–1982
- Ron Douglas, 1982–1986
- Hon Ron Davies, 1986–1990
- David Fischer, 1990–1992
- Gary Stokes, 1992–1994
- Bill Hassell, 1994–1996
- Hon Clive Griffiths, 1997–2001
- Robert Fisher, 2001–2005
- Noel Ashcroft, 2005–2008
- Dr. Kerry Sanderson, 2008–2012
- Kevin Skipworth, 2012–2015
- John Atkins, 2015–2018
- Commodore Michael Deeks CSC RAN Rtd, 2018–2021
- John Langoulant, 2021–2024
- Angela Kelly PSM, 2024–2025
- Rebecca Tomkinson, 2025–

== Canada ==
=== Agents-general for Canada ===
to the United Kingdom

- Edward Jenkins, MP for Dundee (1874–1876)
- William Annand (1876–1878)

to France

- Hector Fabre (1886–1910)
- Philippe Roy (1911–1912)

=== Agents-general for Alberta ===
- John Alexander Reid (Great War)
- Herbert Greenfield (1927–1931)
- R. A. McMullen (circa 1966)
- James McKibben (1980s)
- Mary LeMessurier (1986–1992)

=== Agents-general for British Columbia ===
- Gilbert Malcolm Sproat (1872–1876)
- Thomas Stahlschmidt
- Henry Coppinger Beeton (1893–1895)
- Forbes George Vernon (1895–1898)
- William Walter (1898–1901)
- John Herbert Turner (1901–1915)
- Sir Richard McBride (1915–1917)
- Frederick Coate Wade (1917–1925)
- Frederick Arthur Pauline (1925–1931)
- Frederick Parker Burden (1931–1934)
- W. A. McAdam (1934–1958)
- B. M. Hoffmeister (1958–1961)
- J. V. Fishei (1961–1964)
- Earle Cathers Westwood (1964–1968)
- Rear Admiral M. G. Stirling (1968–1975)
- R. M. Strachan (1975–1977)
- L. J. Wallace (1977–1980)
- WR. Smart (Acting) (1980)
- A. H. Hart (1981–1987)
- Garde B. Gardom (1987–1992)
- Mark Willson Rose (1992–1995)
- Paul William King (Acting) (1995–2002)

=== Agents-general for Manitoba ===
- Anthony John McMillan (c. 1890–1900)
- R. Murray Armstrong (1955–1963)

As it was difficult to compete with larger provinces like Ontario and Quebec, the province of Manitoba decided to leave trade promotion to the federal government and accordingly recalled their agent-general in 1965 without appointing a replacement.

=== Agents-general for New Brunswick ===
- Frederick W. Sumner (1915–)

=== Agents-general for Nova Scotia ===
- Joshua Maugher (1761–1768)
- William Annand (1878–1887)
- John Howard (1892–1929)
- Miss Jean Iris Howard (Acting, 1929–1930s)
- Charles Arthur Richardson (1969–1972)
- John Elvin Shaffner (1973–1976)
- Rear Admiral Desmond Piers (1977–1979)
- Donald MacKeen Smith (1980–?)

=== Agents-general for Ontario ===
to the United Kingdom

- Southworth (1908–?)
- Richard Reid (1913–1916) Died in office
- Brigadier-General Manley R. Sims (1918–1920)
- G. C. Creelman (1920–1921)
- William C. Noxon (1921–1934)
- vacant (1934–1944)
- James S. P. Armstrong (1944–1967)
- Allan Rowan-Legg (1968–1972)
- Ward Cornell (1972–1978)
- W. Ross DeGeer (1978–1985)
- Thomas Leonard Wells (1985–1992)
- Robert Nixon (1992–1994)
- Taylor Shields (2019, rescinded)
- Sophia Arvanitis (2021-present)

to Asia-Pacific

- Tim (Thomas E.) Armstrong (1986-1990)

to South East Asia

- Bernard Derible (2025—present)

to France

- Patrick J. Lavelle (1981-1983)
- Adrienne Clarkson (1983–1988)

to Japan

- Robin Sears (1990–1994)

to New York City

- Carlton Masters (1992)
- Tyler Albrecht (2019, rescinded)

to Chicago

- Earl Provost (2019—present)

to Dallas

- Jag Badwal (2019—present)

=== Agents-general for Prince Edward Island ===
- Harrison Watson (1902–?)

=== Agents-general for Quebec ===
Quebec uses the title agent-general or delegate-general. In 1936, legislation was passed by the government of Maurice Duplessis closing all Quebec government offices abroad. The government of Adélard Godbout repealed the legislation and opened an office in New York City in 1940. When Duplessis returned to power in 1944, his government retained the New York City office and its agent-general but opened no others. In the early 1960s, the government of Jean Lesage began to open additional offices abroad appointing in Paris (1961), London (1962), Rome and Milan (1965) and subsequent governments opened offices in Chicago (1969), Boston, Lafayette, Dallas and Los Angeles (1970), Munich and Berlin (1971), Brussels (1972), Atlanta (1977), Washington (1978), Mexico City and Tokyo (1980), Beijing and Santiago (1998), Shanghai and Barcelona (1999), Mumbai (2007), São Paulo (2008) and Moscow (2012). In 1971, the title of agent-general was officially changed to delegate-general although previous title is still often used, particularly for the government's representative to London.

As of 2024, the Government of Quebec has 35 offices abroad, including 9 delegates-general.

to the United Kingdom

- Jean-Marie-Joseph-Pantaléon Pelletier (1911–1924)
- Louis-Joseph Lemieux (1925–1936)
- vacant (1936–1961)
- Hugues Lapointe (1961–1966)
- Guy Roberge (1966–1971)
- Jean Fournier (1971–1977)
- Gilles Loiselle (1977–1983)
- Patrick Hyndman (1983–1987)
- Reed Scowen (1987–1992)
- Harold Mailhot (1992–1995)
- Richard Guay (1995–2000)
- Daniel Audet (2000–2003)
- George R. MacLaren (2003–2008)
- Pierre Boulanger (2008–2012)
- Stéphane Paquet (2012–2014)
- Christos Sirros (2014–2017)
- John A. Coleman (2017–2019)
- Pierre Gabriel Côté (2019–2021)
- Line Rivard (Nov 22, 2021- Oct 5, 2025)Nominations du Conseil des ministres
- Geneviève Brisson (Oct 6, 2025 - present)Nominations du Conseil des ministres

to France

- Hector Fabre (1882–1910)
- Philippe Roy (1911–1912)
- vacant (1912–1961)
- Charles Lussier (1961–1964)
- Jean Chapdelaine (delegate general) (1964–1976)
- François Cloutier (delegate general) (1976–1977)
- Jean Deschamps (delegate general) (1977–1979)
- Yves Michaud (delegate general) (1979–1984)
- Louise Beaudoin (delegate general) (1984–1985)
- Claude Pug (delegate general) (1985–1986)
- Jean-Louis Roy (delegate general) (1986–1990)
- Marcel Bergeron (delegate general) (1990–1991)
- André Dufour (delegate general) (1991–1994)
- Claude Pug (delegate general) (1994–1995)
- Marcel Masse (delegate general) (1995–1997)
- Michel Lucier (delegate general) (1997–2000)
- Clément Duhaime (delegate general) (2000–2005)
- Wilfrid-Guy Licari (delegate general) (2005–2010)
- Michel Robitaille (delegate general) (2010–present)

to Belgium

- Godfroy Langlois (1914–1928)
- vacant (1936–1972)
- Jean Deschamps (1972–1977)
- Jean Chapdelaine (chargé des affaires) (1977)
- André Patry (1978)
- Jean-Marc Léger (1978–1981)
- Jean-Paul L'Allier (1981–1984)
- Jean Tardif (1984–1986)
- Claude Roquet (1986–1989)
- Pierre Lorrain (1989–1993)
- Gérard P. Latulippe (1993–1996)
- Denis de Belleval (1996–1999)
- Richard Guay (1999–2001)
- Nicole Stafford (2001–2004)
- Christos Sirros (2004–2014)
- Michel Audet (delegate general) (2014–present)

to Germany (Munich)

- Claude Trudelle (delegate general) (as of 2016)

to Japan

- Claire Deronzier (delegate general) (2013–present)

to Mexico

- Christiane Pelchat (delegate general) (2011–2014)
- Eric R. Mercier (delegate general) (as of 2016)

to the United States (New York City)

- Charles Chartier (1940–1967)
- Jean-Marc Roy (1967–1969)
- Général Jean V. Allard (1969–1971)
- Guy Poliquin (1971–1977)
- Marcel Bergeron (delegate general) (1977–1980)
- Richard Pouliot (delegate general) (1980–1982)
- Raymond Gosselin (delegate general) (1982–1984)
- Rita Dionne-Marsolais (delegate general) (1984–1987)
- Léo Paré (delegate general) (1987–1992)
- Reed Scowen (delegate general) (1992–1994)
- Kevin Drummond (delegate general) (1994–1997)
- David Levine (delegate general) (1997–1998)
- Diane Wilhelmy (delegate general) (1998–2002)
- Michel Robitaille (delegate general) (2002–2007)
- Bruno Fortier (delegate general) (2007–2008)
- Robert Keating (delegate general) (2008–2009)
- John Parisella (delegate general) (2009–2012)
- André Boisclair (delegate general) (2012–2013)
- Dominique Poirier (delegate general) (2013–2014)
- Jean-Claude Lauzon (delegate general) (2014–present)

=== Agents-general for Saskatchewan ===
- Graham Spry (1946–1968)
- Edward Arthur Boden (1973–1977)
- Merv Johnson (1977–1983)
- Robert Larter
- Paul Emile Rousseau (1986–1991)
- Ranissah Samah (Oct 2021–present)LinkedIn

== Jamaica ==
Source: Historic Jamaica.

- 1664–1666: Sir James Modyford
- 1682–?: Sir Charles Lyttelton
- William Beeston
- 1688: Ralph Knight
- Gilbert Heathcote
- 1693–1704: Bartholomew Gracedieu
- 1714: P. Marsh
- 1725: Alexander Stephenson
- 1725–1726: Edward Charlton
- 1728–1733: Charles de la Foy
- 1733: John Gregory
- 1733–1757: John Sharpe
- 1757–1762: Lovell Stanhope (MP for Winchester)
- 1764–1795: Stephen Fuller
- 1795–1803: Robert Sewell
- 1803–1812: Edmund Pusey Lyon
- 1812–1831: George Hibbert
- 1831–1845: William Burge
- 1845 Office abolished

== Malta ==
With the granting of responsible self-government to Malta in 1921, a proposal of the government of Lord Strickland to appoint an agent-general to "encourage the migration of Maltese to the Northern Territory and north-west Australia" was presented to the parliament. Strickland, who was Governor of Western Australia (1909–1913) suggested former Colonial Secretary and Agent-General of Western Australia in London, Sir James Connolly. The position was discontinued with the suspension of the constitution in November 1933 and was replaced by a Trade Commissioner, who was in turn replaced by a Commissioner-General in 1947.

Agents-General	Years	Notes
Sir James Connolly	30 January 1929 – 23 December 1932	
Constantine John Colombos (acting)	23 December 1932 – 2 November 1933	

== South Africa ==
Prior to the creation of the Union of South Africa in 1910, the four constituent British colonies of southern Africa all sent agents-general to London, coinciding with the establishment of responsible self-government in each colony.

=== Agent-general for the Orange River Colony ===
The Orange River Colony sent an agent-general from 1908 until the creation of the Union of South Africa in 1910. Brounger was a former director of the Orange Free State Railways.

Agents-General	Years	Notes
Richard Ernest Brounger	August 1908 – 31 May 1910	

=== Agent-general for the Transvaal Colony ===
The Transvaal Colony sent an agent-general from the establishment of responsible self-government in 1907 until the creation of the Union of South Africa in 1910. Solomon then served as the first South African High Commissioner in London from 1910 to 1913.

Agents-General	Years	Notes
Sir Richard Solomon	3 May 1907 – 31 May 1910	

=== Agents-general for the Cape Colony ===
The Cape Colony sent separate agents-general until the creation of the Union of South Africa in 1910.

Agents-General	Years	Notes
Sir Charles Mills	October 1882 – 31 March 1895	
Sir David Tennant	1896 – 31 December 1901	
Sir Thomas Ekins Fuller	1 January 1902 – 31 December 1907	
Sir Somerset Richard French	1 January 1908 – 31 May 1910	

=== Agents-general for Natal ===
The Colony of Natal sent separate agents-general until the creation of the Union of South Africa in 1910.

Agents-General	Years	Notes
Sir Walter Peace	December 1893 – 28 January 1904	
Sir William Arbuckle	1 November 1904 – November 1909	
Robert C. Russell (acting)	November 1909 – 31 May 1910	

== New Zealand ==
After 1905 the position of Agent-General was replaced by that of High Commissioner, with the final Agent-General becoming the first High Commissioner.

Agents-General	Years	Notes
Isaac Featherston	1871 – 19 June 1876	
W. Tyrone Power (acting)	1876	
Sir Julius Vogel	1876–1880	
Sir Dillon Bell	1880–1891	
Sir Westby Perceval	1891–1895	
William Pember Reeves	1895–1905	

== Nigerian regions ==
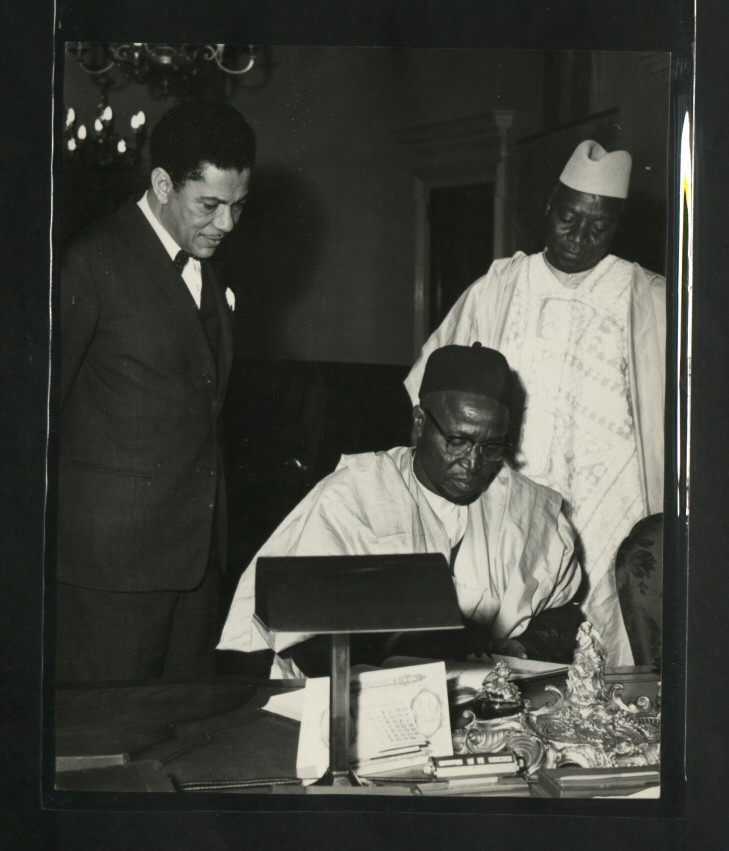
Signing the visitors' book at Nigeria House with Arthur Prest (left) and Alhaji Sa'adu Alanamu (right)

The First Nigerian agents-general to the United Kingdom were appointed in December 1959 and include:

- Northern Region: Alhaji Sa'adu Alanamu
- Eastern Region: Jonah Chinyere Achara
- Western Region: Chief Akitoye Emmanuel Coker

The last Nigerian agents-General in London were:

- Northern Region: Baba Gana
- Eastern Region: A. Ekukinam-Bassey
- Western Region: Prince Delphus Adebayo Odubanjo
- Mid-West Region: Josiah A.P. Oki

== Bibliography ==
- Hilliker, John; Barry, Donald (1995). Canada's Department of External Affairs. Volume 2: Coming of Age, 1946–1968. Canadian Public Administration Series. Vol. 20. Montreal: McGill-Queen's University Press. ISBN 978-0-7735-0738-8. ISSN 0384-854X.
- Australian Dictionary of Biography
