= 1965 Bondi state by-election =

Election result for Bondi, New South Wales, Australia

A by-election was held for the New South Wales Legislative Assembly electorate of Bondi on 6 November 1965 because Abe Landa (Labor) resigned to accept the position of Agent-General for New South Wales in London. This position was usually a sinecure for retiring members of the ruling party but Premier Robert Askin offered it to Landa to force his resignation from parliament and cause a by-election with the hope of increasing his government's small majority. Landa's acceptance of the position resulted in his expulsion from the Labor Party.

== Dates ==
Date	Event
23 September 1965	Landa resigned from Parliament.
19 October 1965	Writ of election issued by the Speaker of the Legislative Assembly.
22 October 1965	Day of nomination
6 November 1965	Polling day
7 December 1965	Return of writ

== Results ==
1965 Bondi by-election Saturday 6 November
Party	Candidate	Votes	%	±%
Labor	Syd Einfeld	10,110	49.9	−3.7
Liberal	John Barraclough	9,579	47.3	+0.9
Democratic Labor	William Slowgrove	493	2.4	
Independent	Albert Rietschel	76	0.4	
Total formal votes		20,258	96.5	−1.3
Informal votes		732	3.5	+1.3
Turnout		20,990	86.8	−5.5
After distribution of preferences
Labor	Syd Einfeld	10,167	50.2	
Liberal	John Barraclough	9,588	47.3	
Democratic Labor	William Slowgrove	503	2.5	
Labor hold		Swing	N/A	

- Preferences were not distributed to completion.

== See also ==
- Electoral results for the district of Bondi
- List of New South Wales state by-elections
