= Joseph Lowe (economist) =

Scottish journalist and political economist

Joseph Lowe (died 1831) was a Scottish journalist and political economist, well known for his pioneer treatment of indexation. Maurice Kendall called him the generally recognised "father of index numbers".

In the debate on the Corn Laws in 1839, Sir Robert Peel cited the views of Lowe and Thomas Tooke, to argue against imposing a low fixed rate of import duty on corn.

== Life ==
From Brechin, Lowe attended the University of St Andrews and University of Edinburgh. He then went into business, spending time in the Netherlands from 1792, and then London.

Lowe spent a period at Caen in France, from June 1814. From September 1815 he was tutor there to Edward Deas Thomson and his elder brother; Thomson later kept in touch and discussed technology with Lowe. He also employed Nathaniel Morren and others as writers. James Mill was a friend of Lowe from school days, and his son John Stuart Mill visited Lowe in France for some weeks in 1821.

Lowe was appointed lecturer in Commerce at King's College, London, around 1830, at the end of his life. According to Mill's biographer Alexander Bain, Lowe was partly dependent on Mill, and was unable to retain his position.

== Books ==
- An Inquiry into the State of the British West Indies (1807)
- Naval Anecdotes: or a New Key to the Proceedings of a late Administration (1807), an anonymous defence of the government, is attributed to Lowe.

The Present State of England in Regard to Agriculture, Trade and Finance (1822) was Lowe's major work, now noted mostly for its Chapter IX, Fluctuation in the Value of Money or in the Price of Commodities, which influenced George Poulett Scrope. Otto Neurath later praised this book as an attempt at a comprehensive sketch of a war economy. Lowe's general conclusions were rather buoyant, allowing the British economy good prospects and the moderation of the culture being promising for the future. He supported free trade and opposed the views of Robert Malthus.

Lowe advocated indexation as applied to bonds, but also to wage contracts and land rents. His advocacy of a "tabular standard" (a precursor of the indexed unit of account) has been recognised as a technical advance in monetary analysis; Lowe used the terms "standard of reference" or "table of reference"; the idea itself, and the term "tabular standard" are attributed to George Shuckburgh-Evelyn.

The first to use weighted index numbers, Lowe in effect anticipated the Laspeyres index. The book reviewed previous work by William Fleetwood, George Shuckburgh and Arthur Young. A German translation appeared in 1823. Lowe innovated in his use of constant price estimates, and the consideration of different demographic groups and their consumption, which anticipated the modern concept of consumer price index. Samuel Bailey argued against the concept of tabular standards, pointing to the difficulties arising from the need for like-to-like comparisons.

William Stanley Jevons later found Lowe's pioneer work on inflation-indexed bonds "ingenious". Lowe was a proponent of such bonds, to support and buffer the developing capital market. The book also opposed expansion of the workhouse system, on grounds of expense.

== Statistician ==
As a statistician, Lowe was one of an early group who collected economic data, and applied it in pamphlets and polemics. In fact the term current then was "political arithmetician". The larger significance of the statistical work of Lowe and Thomas Tooke is that they collected figures from the period of the Continental System, of the latter part of the Napoleonic Wars. These data were then deployed in the theoretical arguments of the 1820s, dominated by David Ricardo and his doctrine on convertibility.

There were no agreed principles on collection and use of data. Others bringing forward sets of figures were Patrick Colquhoun, Sir Frederick Eden, 2nd Baronet, and George Richardson Porter. Their work carried less intellectual prestige than that of the political economists. Lowe was mainly concerned with fiscal policy. He accused those who had drawn up the Bullion Report into monetary policy after the end of the Napoleonic Wars of failing to take into account recent economic growth. He argued the point quantitatively for the previous decade in The Present State of England (1822).

== Journalism ==
Lowe turned from his career as merchant to writing, after a reply he made to a pamphlet of Henry Brougham in 1806 was a success. He wrote for Lloyd's Evening Post and the Edinburgh Review. He mainly contributed to the Monthly Review, for which he wrote in the period 1805 to 1815. In reviewing a work of Davis Giddy on bullionism, he produced his own analysis, in the context of the Napoleonic Wars, of the connection of foreign exchange and shortages of bullion. He also contributed to The Athenaeum edited by John Aikin.

== Encyclopedias ==
Lowe wrote in the 1824 Britannica supplement on copyright, using the article to advocate for an extension of the current term of authors' copyright. This work was reprinted in Remarks on Literary Property (1838) by Philip Houlbrooke Nicklin in Philadelphia. In the Encyclopædia Britannica Seventh Edition Lowe wrote on "Austria" and "Book-Keeping". He wrote also for the Edinburgh Encyclopædia, on "Bullion", "Commerce", "Currency" and other topics.
