= Francis Merewether (Australian politician) =

Australian politician

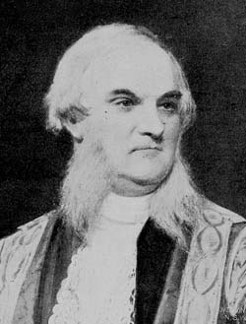

Francis Lewis Shaw Merewether (18 March 1811 – 27 December 1899) was an English-born Australian politician. Merewether served as the Chancellor of the University of Sydney between 1862 and 1865 and the Vice-Chancellor between 1854 and 1862.

He was the son of clergyman Francis Merewether and Frances Elizabeth Way, and attended Eton College and Cambridge University. In 1838 he migrated to Sydney, where he worked in the treasury department and as an immigration agent. In 1841 he married Kate Amelia Plunkett, with whom he had five children. He was a non-elective member of the New South Wales Legislative Council from 1851 to 1856, during which time he served as Postmaster-General (1851–52) and Auditor-General (1852–56), as well as acting Colonial Treasurer (1854–56). He served in the re-constituted Council from 1856 to 1861 and from 1861 to 1865, when his seat was vacated due to absence.

Merewether died in Essex in 1899 (aged 88).

Political offices
Preceded by James Raymond	Postmaster-General; 1851 – 1852	Succeeded by William Christie
Preceded by William Lithgow	Auditor-General of New South Wales; 1852 – 1856	Succeeded by Bob Nichols
Preceded by Campbell Riddell	Acting Colonial Treasurer; 1854 – 1856	Succeeded by Campbell Riddell
Academic offices
Preceded by Charles Nicholson	Vice-Chancellor of the University of Sydney; 1854–1862	Succeeded by Edward Deas Thomson
Preceded by Charles Nicholson	Chancellor of the University of Sydney; 1862–1865	Succeeded by Edward Deas Thomson
