= William Lithgow (auditor-general) =

Australian politician (1784–1864)

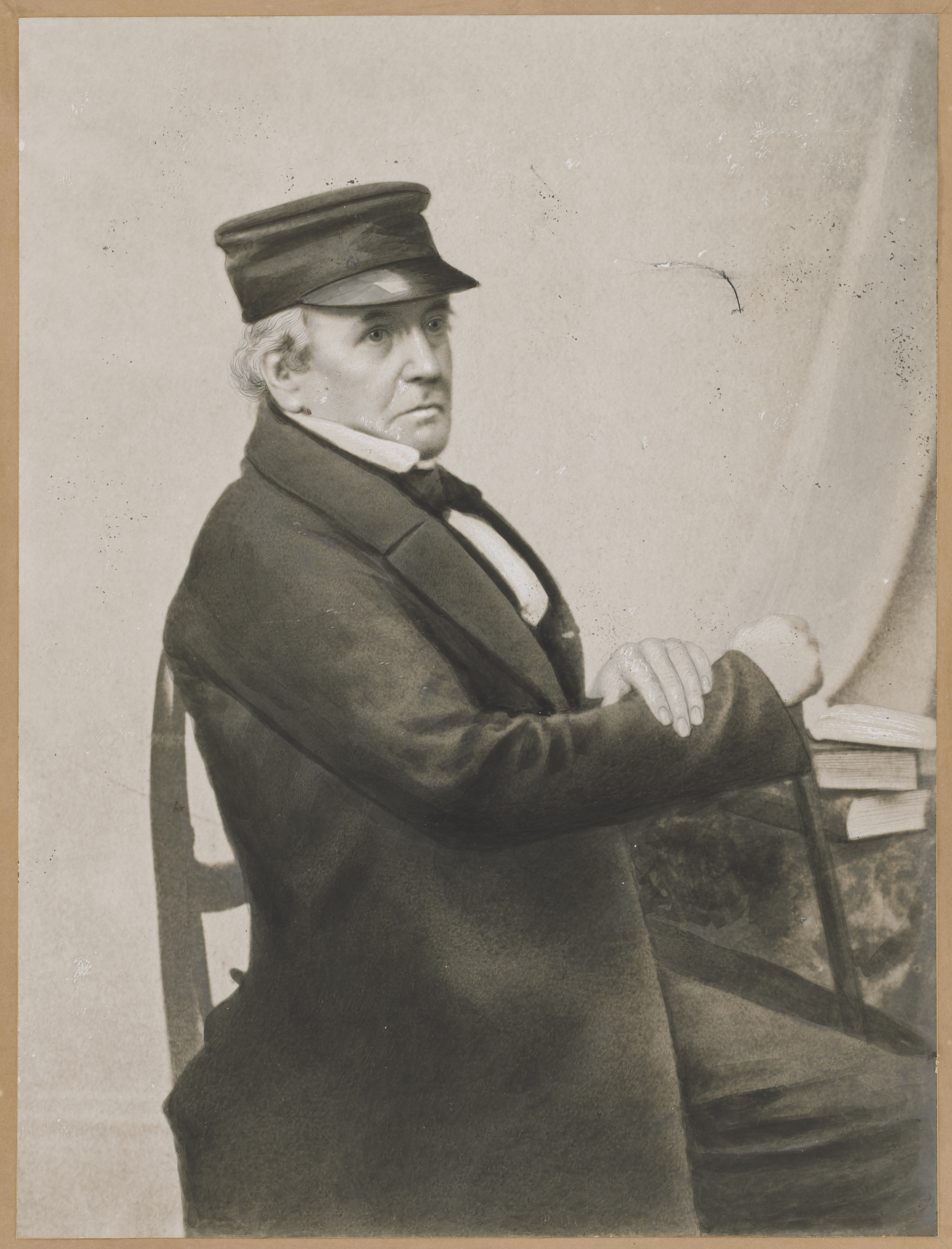

Member of the New South Wales Legislative Council
- In office 30 January 1829 – 30 April 1852

Auditor-General of Colonial Accounts in New South Wales
- In office 8 November 1824 – 30 April 1852
- Preceded by: new title
- Succeeded by: Francis Merewether

Personal details
- Born: 1 January 1784 Scotland
- Died: 11 June 1864 (aged 80) St Leonards, New South Wales, Australia
- Education: University of Edinburgh
- Occupation: Politician
- Salary: A£650 per annum

William Lithgow (1 January 1784 – 11 June 1864) was educated at the University of Edinburgh, graduating as a Licentiate of the Church of Scotland. He was the Auditor-General of the colony of New South Wales in Australia.

Lithgow was born in Scotland. He was an appointed member of the New South Wales Legislative Council from 30 January 1829 to 30 April 1852. He was Auditor-General from 8 November 1824 to 30 April 1852.

Lithgow died in St Leonards, New South Wales on 11 June 1864.

== Legacy ==
The city of Lithgow in New South Wales was named in honour of William Lithgow by his friend, and Surveyor General of New South Wales, John Oxley.

Political offices
New title	Auditor-General of Colonial Accounts in New South Wales; 1824–1852	Succeeded by Francis Merewether
