= Abe Landa =

Australian politician

The Honourable Abe Landa CMG

Minister for Housing
- In office 16 March 1956 – 13 May 1965
- Premier: Joseph Cahill; Bob Heffron; Jack Renshaw
- Preceded by: John McGrath
- Succeeded by: Stanley Stephens

Agent-General for New South Wales
- In office 24 September 1965 – 5 November 1970
- Preceded by: Francis Buckley
- Succeeded by: Sir John Pagan

Personal details
- Born: 10 November 1902 near Belfast, Ireland, United Kingdom
- Died: 10 July 1989 (aged 86) Vaucluse, New South Wales, Australia
- Party: Australian Labor Party (NSW), Australian Labor Party (New South Wales Branch)

Abram Landa CMG (10 November 1902 – 7 October 1989) was an Australian politician and a member of the New South Wales Legislative Assembly from 1930 until 1932 and from 1941 until 1965. He was variously a member of the Australian Labor Party (NSW) and the Australian Labor Party (New South Wales Branch). He held a number of ministerial positions between 1953 and 1965.

== Early and personal life ==
Landa was born in Belfast, Ireland and migrated to Sydney with his widowed mother in 1910. He was educated at Christian Brothers, Waverley and won a scholarship to study law at the University of Sydney. He practiced as a solicitor mainly in Industrial Law and joined the ALP in 1919. He was an advisor to Doc Evatt at the United Nations meetings in Lake Success. Landa was a prominent member of Sydney's Jewish Community. He was the uncle of Paul Landa who was a member of the Legislative Assembly and the New South Wales Legislative Council.

== State Parliament ==
Landa was elected as the Labor member for Bondi at the 1930 state election. He defeated the sitting Nationalist member Harold Jaques and his victory contributed to Labor forming a government under Jack Lang. However, he lost the seat in the 1932 landslide that ended Lang's premiership. Landa regained the seat at the 1941 election which resulted in Labor regaining power under William McKell. He retained the seat for the next 8 elections.

Landa held ministerial positions in the governments of Joseph Cahill, Robert Heffron and Jack Renshaw. He was the Minister for Labour and Industry and Social Welfare from 1953 till 1956, the Minister for Housing from 1956 and Minister for Co-operative Societies from 1959, holding both portfolios until the defeat of the Labor government in 1965.

== Later life and career ==
Following the victory of Robert Askin's conservative coalition at the 1965 election, Landa was controversially offered and accepted an appointment as the Agent-General for New South Wales in London. This position was usually a sinecure for retiring members of the ruling party but Askin offered it to Landa to force his resignation from parliament and cause a by-election with the hope of increasing his government's small majority. Landa's acceptance of the position resulted in his expulsion from the Labor Party. However, Askin's plans were frustrated when the by-election was won by Labor's Syd Einfeld.

Granted retention of the "Honourable" in 1965, Landa was appointed a Companion of the Order of St Michael and St George (CMG) in 1968.

Parliament of New South Wales
Political offices
| Preceded by Frank Finnan | Minister for Labour and Industry; 1953 – 1956 | Succeeded by James Maloney |
| Preceded by Frank Finnan | Minister for Social Welfare; 1953 – 1956 | Succeeded by Frank Hawkins as Minister for Social Welfare; Minister for Child Welfare |
| Preceded by John McGrath | Minister for Housing; 1956 – 1965 | Succeeded by Stanley Stephens |
| Preceded by Gus Kelly | Minister for Co-operative Societies; 1959 – 1965 | Succeeded by Stanley Stephens |
New South Wales Legislative Assembly
| Preceded by Harold Jaques | Member for Bondi; 1930 – 1932 | Succeeded by Norman Thomas |
| Preceded by Norman Thomas | Member for Bondi; 1941 – 1965 | Succeeded by Syd Einfeld |
Diplomatic posts
| Preceded by Francis Buckley | Agent-General for New South Wales; 1965 – 1970 | Succeeded by Sir John Pagan |
