= Queen's Club, Sydney =

Ladies club in Sydney, Australia

Queen's Club
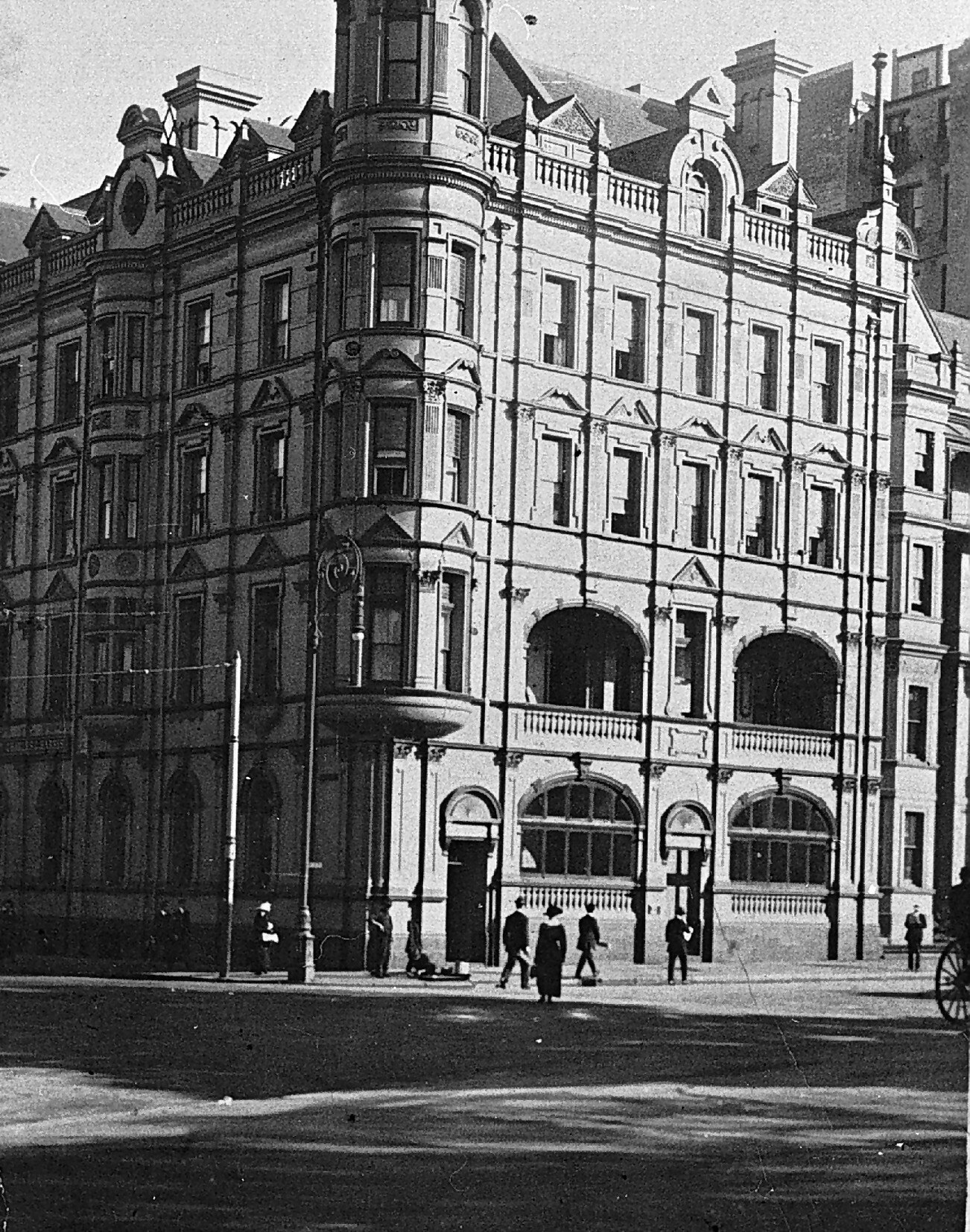
- Queen's Club building, c. 1930, in Queens Square, Sydney.
- Formation: February 1, 1912
- Location: 137 Elizabeth Street, Sydney
- Coordinates: 33.8709°S 151.2099°E
- Website: Queen's Club

The Queen's Club is a private, women-only club in Sydney, Australia. Founded in 1912, it is located at 137 Elizabeth Street. It is often described as the "sister" club to the Australian Club.

== History ==
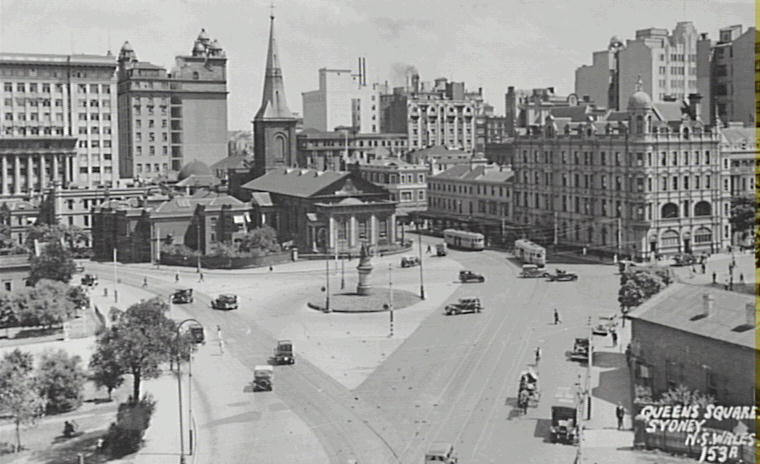
View of Queens Square, c. 1930 with The Towers on the right.

The Queen's Club was officially inaugurated on 1 February 1912 by the club's first president, Jane Barton, wife of Australia's first Prime Minister, Edmund Barton, and was based at The Towers (also known as Queens Chambers and Barristers Chambers), on the corner of Macquarie and King Streets, from this location in Queens Square is where the club gets its name. By 1914 the club had over 350 members, the club expanding into the neighboring buildings either side of The Towers.

From its inception, the Queen's Club was very much created for elite women, namely the mothers, daughters, and wives of powerful men. In August, 1938, the Queen's Club acquired Lachlan House (229-231 Macquarie St, later redeveloped as the William Bland Centre), this was sold to a dental facilities company in April, 1956. In the 1950s the New South Wales state government advised that The Towers was to be demolished to make way for the new Law Courts Building as part of the Supreme Court facilities, the Queen's Club moving to the St James Hotel which the club purchased in June, 1959. The club merged with the Macquarie Club on 1 January 1975, with members from the latter club becoming members of the Queen's Club.

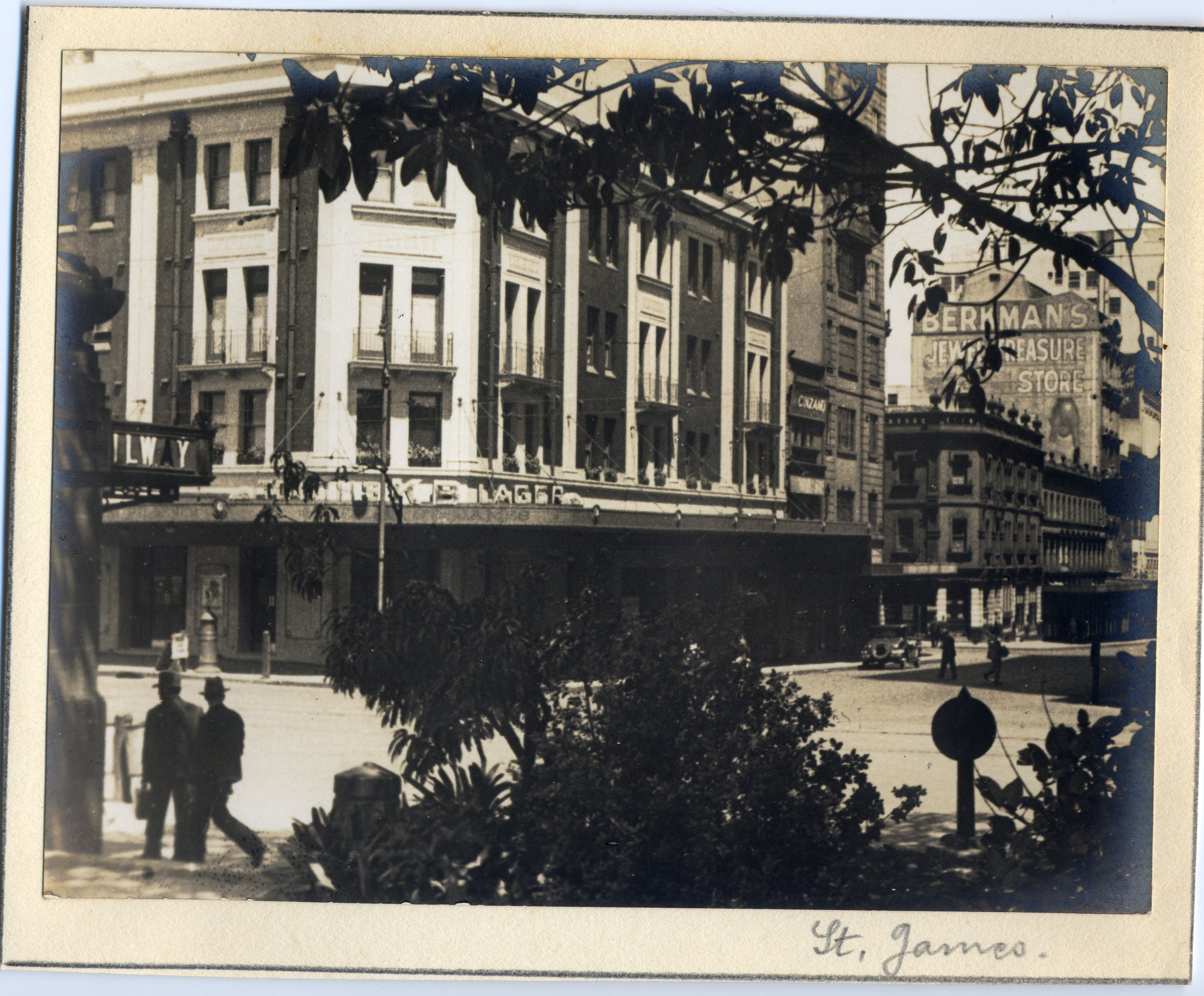
St James Hotel on Elizabeth Street in 1930, before becoming the current Queen's Club premises in 1959.

== Reciprocities ==
- Colony Club (New York)
- Cosmopolitan Club (New York)
- Chilton Club (Boston)
- Sulgrave Club (Washington DC)
- Francisca Club (San Francisco)
- Town and Country Club (San Francisco)
- Alexandra Club (Melbourne)
- Caledonian Club (London)
- Commonwealth Club (Canberra)
- Launceston Club (Launceston)
- Moreton Club (Brisbane)
- Naval and Military Club (London)
- New Club (Edinburgh)
- Oriental Club (London)
- Wellington Club (Wellington)
- Western Club (Glasgow)

== See also ==
- List of women's clubs
