= Agent-General for New South Wales =

Government representative of New South Wales in the UK

- Incumbent; Vacant since 28 June 2023
- Department of Enterprise, Investment and Trade – Investment NSW
- Reports to: Anoulack Chanthivong, Minister for Industry and Trade
- Seat: Australia House, London
- Appointer: Government of New South Wales
- Formation: 10 November 1864
- First holder: William Colburn Mayne
- Website: Investment NSW – United Kingdom

The Agent-General for New South Wales is the representative of the State of New South Wales in the United Kingdom who is responsible for the promotion of New South Wales' trade and economic interests in the United Kingdom, Europe and Israel. The holder is a state government public servant, as part of the Investment NSW agency, and also concurrently serves as New South Wales' Senior Trade and Investment Commissioner for Europe and Israel.

The first agent-general was appointed in 1864 as a representative of the Colony of New South Wales, and apart from a short period between 1932 and 1934, the role existed until its abolition in 1993. The position was revived in 2021, and was held until June 2023 by former Investment NSW CEO Stephen Cartwright.

== History ==
The New South Wales Office in London was one of several overseas offices established by the colonies of Australia to represent their interests. The London Office was established after the appointment of the first Agent-General on 1 May 1864. In June 1932, the Agent-General's Office was abolished as a cost-cutting measure and was replaced by the New South Wales Government Offices, London, to be headed by an "Official Representative". The title was renamed Agent-General in 1937, but was left vacant from 1939 to 1946 due to the Second World War. From 1972 to 1993, the Agent-General's Office was located in separate premises from Australia House, at the nearby address of 66 The Strand, which was opened by Queen Elizabeth II in May 1972.

In October 1992, the position of NSW Agent-General in London was abolished by the Fahey government. This occurred following an expenses scandal by the last Agent-General, Neil Pickard, who had been appointed as a consolation for losing his seat in parliament. Following its abolition, Fahey noted to Parliament: "It was abundantly clear to me, to all Cabinet and to all Government that we no longer needed an agent-general's office in London. That was a throwback to colonial days – to the days when it was important to have garden parties and to participate in ceremonies. Quite frankly, little or no benefit accrued to New South Wales by participating in such a process." The Agent-General's Office was replaced by the NSW Government Trade and Investment Office, London, which had no ceremonial function, but focused on the promotion of investment and trade in the UK and Europe. The NSW Government of Gladys Berejiklian considered reviving the Agent-General position in late-2019, noting that "We know the post-Brexit environment is going to be very different and NSW can gain a lot of opportunities in business from the UK".

The position was revived in 2021, with an expanded remit to additionally cover Europe and Israel.

List of agents-general
| Agents-general | Term start | Term end | Time in office | Notes |
|---|---|---|---|---|
| William Mayne | 10 November 1864 | 1871 | 6 years | |
| Charles Cowper | 6 December 1870 | 19 October 1875 | 4 years, 317 days | |
| William Forster | 8 February 1876 | 7 October 1879 | 3 years, 241 days | |
| Alexander Stuart | 25 November 1879 | April 1880 | 142 days | |
| Sir Saul Samuel | 11 August 1880 | 1 October 1897 | 17 years, 51 days | |
| Sir Daniel Cooper, Bt | 1 October 1897 | 27 March 1899 | 1 year, 177 days | |
| Sir Julian Salomons | 27 March 1899 | 14 May 1900 | 1 year, 48 days | |
| Henry Copeland | 14 May 1900 | 18 July 1903 | 3 years, 65 days | |
| The Earl of Jersey | 18 July 1903 | 1 April 1905 | 1 year, 257 days | |
| Sir Timothy Coghlan | 1 April 1905 | 26 May 1915 | 10 years, 55 days | |
| Bernhard Wise | 26 May 1915 | 21 September 1916 | 1 year, 118 days | |
| Sir Timothy Coghlan | 21 September 1916 | 2 May 1917 | 223 days | |
| Sir Charles Wade | 2 May 1917 | 15 March 1920 | 2 years, 318 days | |
| David Hall | 17 March 1920 | 6 May 1920 | 50 days | |
| Sir Timothy Coghlan | 6 May 1920 | 20 April 1925 | 4 years, 349 days | |
| Sir Arthur Cocks | 20 April 1925 | 21 September 1925 | 154 days | |
| Sir Timothy Coghlan | 21 September 1925 | 30 April 1926 | 221 days | |
| Edward McTiernan (acting) | 2 May 1926 | 14 June 1926 | 43 days | |
| The Viscount Chelmsford | 14 June 1926 | 14 April 1928 | 1 year, 305 days | |
| Sir George Fuller | 14 April 1928 | 14 April 1931 | 3 years, 0 days | |
| Albert Willis | 14 April 1931 | 30 July 1932 | 1 year, 107 days | |
| Albert Heath (Official Representative) | 15 February 1934 | 26 January 1937 | 2 years, 346 days | |
| Albert Heath | 26 January 1937 | 27 May 1938 | 1 year, 121 days | |
| Clifford Hay | 20 June 1938 | November 1939 | 1 years | |
| Jack Tully | 1 June 1946 | 1 July 1954 | 8 years, 30 days | |
| Francis Buckley | 1 July 1954 | 24 September 1965 | 11 years, 85 days | |
| Abe Landa | 24 September 1965 | 5 November 1970 | 5 years, 42 days | |
| Sir John Pagan | 5 November 1970 | 18 January 1973 | 2 years, 74 days | |
| Sir Davis Hughes | 18 January 1973 | December 1977 | 4 years | |
| Peter Valkenburg | 18 January 1978 | April 1980 | 2 years | |
| Jack Renshaw | April 1980 | January 1983 | 2 years | |
| Reginald Watson | January 1983 | March 1986 | 3 years | |
| Kevin Stewart | March 1986 | February 1989 | 2 years | |
| Norman Brunsdon | February 1989 | August 1991 | 2 years | |
| Neil Pickard | 16 September 1991 | 4 March 1993 | 1 year, 169 days | |
| Stephen Cartwright OAM | 1 October 2021 | 28 June 2023 | 1 year, 270 days | |

== See also ==
- Agent-General
- Agent-General for South Australia
