= Dominique Poirier =

Canadian journalist and radio/TV host (born 1963)

- Born: 18 May 1963 (age 62); Montreal, Quebec, Canada
- Occupations: Journalist, radio and television host, diplomat
- Years active: 1983–present

Dominique Poirier (born 18 May 1963 in Montreal, Quebec) is a Canadian journalist and host of radio and television. She has spent most of her career working for French-language public broadcaster Société Radio-Canada. She was also the Quebec Delegate General in New York from 2013 to 2014.

== Biography ==
Dominique Poirier studied art history at l’école Promédia de Montréal, when she was offered a job as a radio host following a short class in Montreal.

=== Career ===
Dominique Poirier started her media career in 1983 as a DJ at CKBS in Saint-Hyacinthe, then in Sherbrooke. Poirier continued intensive work, moving to French-language public broadcaster Radio-Canada in 1985. Because she did not have a journalism degree, Poirier had to gain field experience working for three years in Regina, Saskatchewan then in Winnipeg, Manitoba.

In 1989 she returned to Montréal as a journalist and anchor on the television news, then on the programme Le Point.

In June 2008, after 23 years on Radio-Canada, Poirier resigned when her television programme Dominique Poirier en direct (English: Dominique Poirier Live) came up for renewal.

Poirier returned to the radio in the summer of 2009 to fill-in for Christiane Charette (on summer vacation). From September 2009, she hosted the programme L'Après-midi porte conseil on Première chaîne.

Poirier had been courted by several political parties to run for office, but preferred diplomacy to politics. On 11 December 2013 Poirier was appointed Quebec Delegate General in New York. She was replaced by Jean-Claude Lauzon on 12 November 2014, and became assistant deputy minister at the Quebec Ministry of International Relations. Poirier was loaned to the City of Montreal to work on international missions for the mayor.
