= Auditor-General of New South Wales =

Independent official responsible for audits of NSW government entities

- Incumbent; Bola Oyetunji since April 2024
- Appointer: The governor of New South Wales
- Term length: Appointed for a term of 8 years, and is ineligible for reappointment
- Formation: 1824
- Website: https://www.audit.nsw.gov.au

The auditor-general of New South Wales helps the Parliament of New South Wales hold government accountable for its use of public resources.

The auditor-general is responsible for audits of NSW Government agencies, universities, and NSW local government, and also provides certain assurance services for Commonwealth grants and payments to the State under Commonwealth legislation. The auditor-general is the head of the Audit Office of New South Wales (AONSW), a statutory authority and integrity agency established under the Government Sector Audit Act 1983 to conduct audits for the auditor-general.

The auditor-general is independent of the Government, and is accountable to the Parliament of New South Wales and regularly reports on the audits. Parliament promotes independence by ensuring the auditor-general and AONSW are not compromised in their roles by:

- providing that only Parliament, and not the executive government, can remove an auditor-general
- mandating the auditor-general as auditor of public sector agencies
- precluding the auditor-general from providing non-audit and assurance services

The Legislative Assembly Public Accounts Committee reviews the appointment of the auditor-general, prior to the official appointment by the governor of New South Wales.

== Audit Office of New South Wales ==
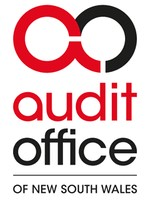
Audit Office of New South Wales

The vision of the Audit Office of New South Wales is Our insights inform and challenge government to improve outcomes for citizens. AONSW is headquartered in the Darling Park office precinct in the Sydney central business district, and is a short walk from Town Hall station.

AONSW comprises four branches:

- Office of the Auditor-General
- Financial Audit
- Performance Audit
- Corporate Services

=== Financial Audit and Performance Audit ===
The Financial Audit and Performance Audit branches conduct financial and performance audits, principally under the Public Finance and Audit Act 1983 and the Corporations Act 2001, and examines allegations of serious and substantial waste of public money under the Public Interest Disclosures Act 1994. In 2016, the Local Government Act 1993 expanded the auditor-general's mandate to include financial and performance auditing of NSW local government.

In 2016-17, AONSW completed 426 financial audits of NSW Government agencies and NSW universities, as well as seventeen performance audits. In 2017-18, this increased to 550 financial audits of NSW Government agencies, NSW universities and NSW local councils, and nineteen performance audits, as a result of the mandate to audit NSW local government. The full list of the financial audits and performance audits are included in Appendix Two and Appendix Five of the 2017-18 Annual Report.

Some of the key NSW agencies audited include:

- Department of Transport
- Roads & Maritime Services
- Ministry of Health
- Department of Education
- Department of Justice
- Department of Premier and Cabinet
- Department of Customer Service which assumed the functions of the former Department of Finance, Services and Innovation after the 2019 state election
- Department of Planning, Industry and Environment
- Department of Family and Community Services
- NSW Treasury

=== Office of the Auditor-General ===
The Office of the Auditor-General is responsible for audit quality and compliance with Australian Auditing Standards, and incorporates the Professional Service Branch responsible for governance matters and disclosures. It has developed a corporate governance model for the NSW public sector, the Governance Lighthouse, reflecting the eight core Australian Securities Exchange (ASX) Corporate Governance Principles across seventeen major points of good governance. The Governance Lighthouse provides practical advice and resources on implementing successful governance in the public sector.

=== Corporate Services ===
Corporate Services supports the service delivery branches of AONSW and comprises back-office functions including:

- Finance
- Communications and Business Support
- Information Technology
- Human Resources and Payroll
- Learning and Development

== Legislative Assembly Public Accounts Committee (PAC) ==
The auditor-general and the Audit Office of New South Wales work closely with Legislative Assembly Public Accounts Committee. The committee was first established in 1902 to scrutinise the actions of the executive branch of government on behalf of the Legislative Assembly.

The Public Accounts Committee has responsibilities under Part 4 of the Public Finance and Audit Act 1983 to inquire into and report on activities of government that are reported in the Total State Sector Accounts and the accounts of the State's authorities. A key part of committee activity is following up aspects of the Auditor-General's Reports to Parliament. The committee may also receive referrals from ministers, the Legislative Assembly and the auditor-general to undertake inquiries. The committee may also recommend improvements to the efficiency and effectiveness of government activities.

== History ==
For more than 185 years, the Audit Office of New South Wales has been assisting the Parliament of New South Wales hold government accountable for its use of public resources. This is done by reporting directly to Parliament on audits of government financial reports and performance.

- 1824 – William Lithgow was appointed Colonial Auditor-General, to compile and examine the colony's accounts and report on government departments to the Governor.
- 1855 – The UK Constitution Act 1855 formalised government in New South Wales, and the auditor-general made a political office and member of the government.
- 1856 – The auditor-general ceased to be a political office.
- 1870 – Powers and duties of the auditor-general first set in legislation, in the Audit Act 1870.
- 1902 – Audit Act 1902 prohibited the auditor-general from being a member of the Executive Council or of parliament.
- 1929 – Audit (Amendment) Act 1929 changed the tenure of office of the auditor-general from life to ceasing at 65. Position of Assistant Auditor-General created.
- 1984 – Public Finance and Audit Act 1983 established the Auditor-General's Office on 6 January 1984.
- 1989 – Auditor-General's Office declared a statutory body, allowing it to be both more independent and more commercial.
- 1991 – The Public Finance and Audit Act 1983 expanded the auditor-general's role to include performance audits, limited tenure to seven years, and prevented acceptance of any other post in the NSW public service.
- 2001 – Auditor-general's role expanded to reporting on issues of waste, probity and financial judgement.
- 2004 – Auditor-general given power to employ staff directly, and set wages and conditions.
- 2013 – Tenure of auditor-general extended to eight years.
- 2016 – The Local Government Act 1993 expanded the auditor-general's mandate to include financial and performance auditing of local councils and council entities
- 2021 – The Public Finance and Audit Act 1983 re-named the Government Sector Audit Act 1983. As part of this, a new principal object was added which specifically provides that the Auditor-General is an independent and accountable statutory officer.

== List of auditors-general of New South Wales ==
The following individuals have served as auditors-general of New South Wales.

Order	Auditor-General	Term start	Term end	Time in office
1	William Lithgow	8 November 1824	30 April 1852	27 years, 174 days
2	Francis Merewether	1852	1856	3–4 years
3	Bob Nichols	6 June 1856	25 August 1856	80 days
4	Terence Murray	26 August 1856	17 September 1856	22 days
5	William Mayne	1856	1864	7–8 years
6	Christopher Rolleston	1864	1883	18–19 years
7	Edward Rennie	1883	1903	19–20 years
Auditor-General's independence from parliament and government established in 1902
8	John Vernon	1903	1915	11–12 years
9	Frederick Coglan	1915	1928	12–13 years
10	John Spence	1928	1942	13–14 years
11	Edmund Swift	1942	1949	6–7 years
12	William Campbell	1950	1963	12–13 years
13	William Mathieson	1963	1967	3–4 years
14	Victor Cohen	1967	1968	0–1 years
15	Daniel Fairlie	1968	1977	8–9 years
16	William Henry	1977	1980	2–3 years
17	Jack O'Donnell	1980	1985	4–5 years
18	Kenneth Robson	1985	1992	6–7 years
19	Anthony Harris	1992	1999	6–7 years
20	Robert Sendt	1999	2006	6–7 years
21	Peter Achterstraat	2006	2013	6–7 years
22	Grant Hehir	2013	2015	1–2 years
23	Margaret Crawford	2016	2024	9–10 years
24	Bola Oyetunji	2024	current	1–2 years
