= Jean Chapdelaine =

Joseph Marc Antoine Jean Chapdelaine (1914 – February 1, 2005), more commonly known as Jean Chapdelaine or J. A. Chapdelaine, was a Canadian diplomat who was ambassador to Sweden, Finland, Brazil, Sudan and Egypt in the 1950s and 1960s. He was also an important figure in the development of Quebec Government Offices and has been called the 'Father of Quebec diplomacy'.

== Biography ==
Chapdelaine attended Collège Sainte-Marie de Montréal and was awarded a Rhodes Scholarship in 1934, studying PPE at Hertford College, Oxford.

Chapdelaine joined the Department for External Affairs in 1937. In 1941, he was third secretary at the Canadian embassy in Washington, D.C., working for Ambassador Leighton McCarthy. Chapdelaine attended the third session of the Food and Agriculture Organization conference in 1947, and the second session of the interim commission of the World Health Organization in 1948.

From January to July 1950, Chapdelaine was the chargé d'affaires to Ireland. From 1955 to 1959 he was the Canadian ambassador to Finland and Sweden, from 1959 to 1963 he was the ambassador to Brazil, and from 1963 to 1964 he was ambassador to Sudan and Egypt (then still called the United Arab Republic). From 1965, Chapdelaine became Quebec's delegate-general in Paris as part of one of the province's Government Offices, although he had hoped he would be nominated as ambassador to France. He held the post until 1976 when he returned to Canada to work as an adviser in the office of Premier René Lévesque. He later became Quebec's delegate-general in Brussels before retiring as a diplomat in the 1980s.

== Honours ==
Chapdelaine received several medals and honours:

- Commandeur of the Légion d'honneur
- Officer of the Order of La Pléiade
- Officer of the National Order of Quebec

Chapdelaine was also given an honorary doctorate in social sciences from the Université Laval in 1975. Since 2006, the university has awarded the Rita and Jean Chapdelaine Scholarship in remembrance of him and his wife.
