= Nathaniel Morren =

Scottish minister and author (1798–1847)

Nathaniel Morren (3 February 1798–28 March 1847) was a Scottish minister and author, known as a historian of the General Assembly of the Church of Scotland.

== Life ==
Born in Aberdeen 3 February 1798, Morren was educated at Aberdeen grammar school and at Marischal College, where he graduated M.A. in 1814. He became a tutor at Fort George, and then taught at Caen, France, a visit to Joseph Lowe set up by Professor George Glennie of the College.

Morren studied theology in the universities of Aberdeen and Edinburgh. He was licensed by the presbytery of Aberdeen in October 1822, and appointed minister of Blackhall Street (later North) Church, Greenock, in June 1823.

At the time of the disruption of 1843, Morren defended the Church of Scotland position, against Patrick Macfarlan, another of the Greenock ministers. He was translated to the first charge of Brechin in September 1843, the post being vacant because James McCosh had seceded.

Morren died of apoplexy on 28 March 1847.

== Works ==
Morren's major work is his Annals of the General Assembly from 1739 to 1766, 2 vols. Edinburgh, 1838–40, much cited by historians of the Scottish church. He was also the author of:

- Biblical Theology, Edinburgh, 1835;
- My Church Politics, Greenock, 1842; and
- Dialogues on the Church Question, Greenock, 1843.

Morren annotated a pocket edition of the Bible, 1845. He translated from the German Ernst Friedrich Karl Rosenmüller's Biblical Geography of Central Asia; and, with others, edited the Imperial Family Bible. He also wrote articles for John Kitto's Biblical Encyclopædia and Myles Macphail's Ecclesiastical Journal.

== Notes ==
Attribution

This article incorporates text from a publication now in the public domain: Lee, Sidney, ed. (1894). "Morren, Nathaniel". Dictionary of National Biography. Vol. 39. London: Smith, Elder & Co.
