= Edward Deas Thomson =

Australian politician (1800–1879)

Sir Edward Deas Thomson KCMG, CB
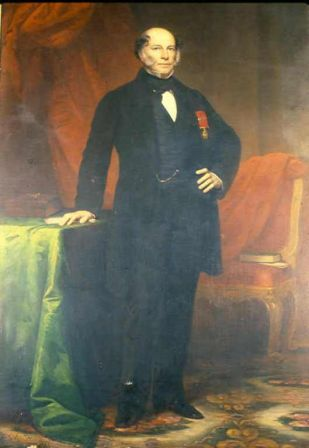
- Sir Edward Deas Thomson, ca. 1865

Colonial Secretary of New South Wales
- In office 2 January 1837 – 5 June 1856
- Monarchs: William IV; Queen Victoria
- Governor: Sir Richard Bourke; Sir George Gipps; Sir Charles FitzRoy; Sir William Denison
- Preceded by: Alexander Macleay
- Succeeded by: Stuart Donaldson

Chancellor of the University of Sydney
- In office 1865–1878
- Preceded by: Francis Merewether
- Succeeded by: William Montagu Manning

Vice-Chancellor of the University of Sydney
- In office 1863–1865
- Preceded by: Francis Merewether
- Succeeded by: John Plunkett

Member of the Legislative Council of New South Wales
- In office 3 January 1837 – 16 July 1879

Personal details
- Born: 1 June 1800 Edinburgh, Scotland
- Died: 16 July 1879 (aged 79) Sydney, New South Wales, Australia
- Education: Harrow School
- Occupation: Government administrator, politician, university administrator
- Awards: Companion of the Order of the Bath; Knight Commander of St Michael and St George

Sir Edward Deas Thomson KCMG, CB (1 June 1800 – 16 July 1879) was a Scotsman who became an administrator and politician in Australia, and was chancellor of the University of Sydney in New South Wales (NSW).

== Background and early career ==
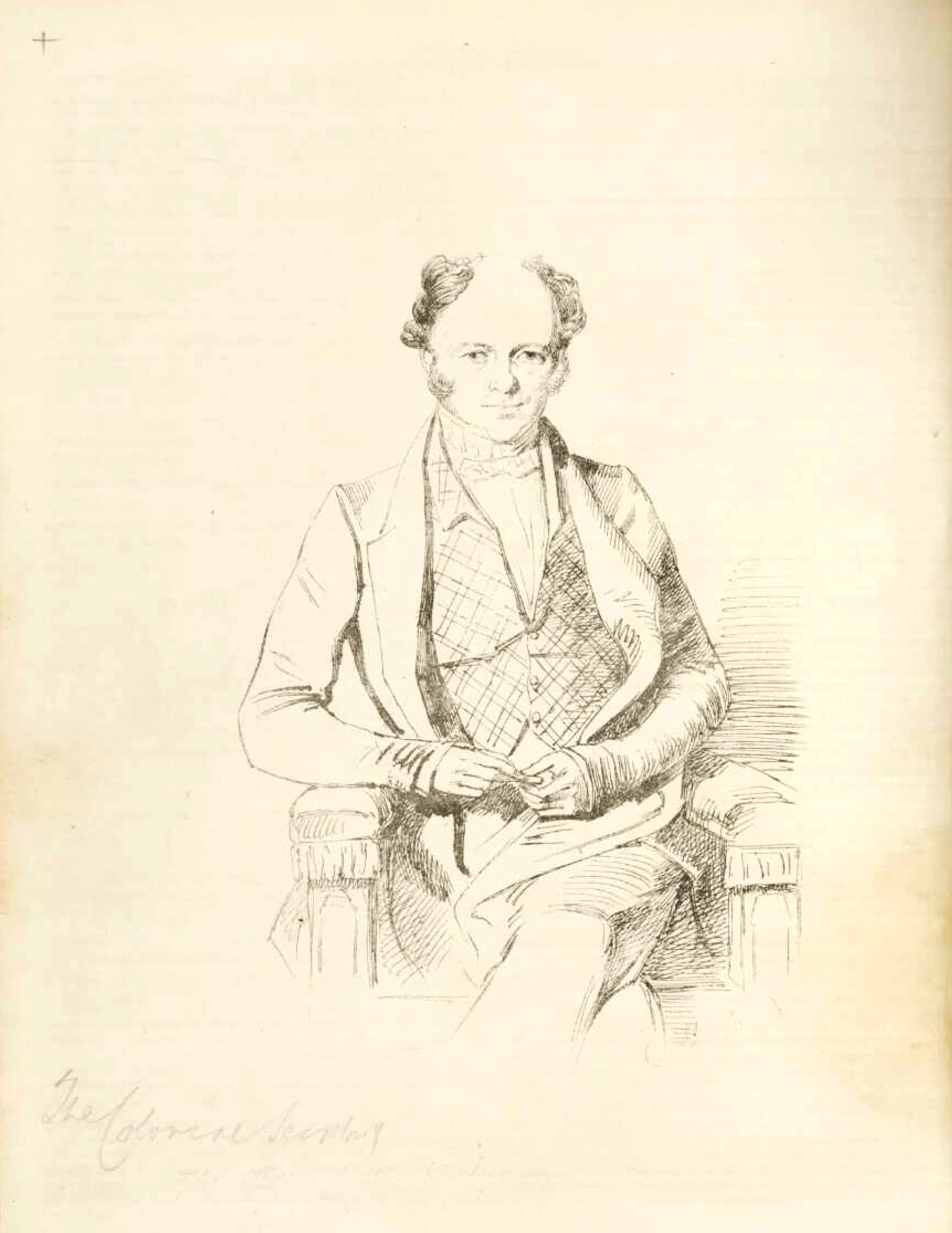
A younger Sir Edward Deas Thomson by William Nicholas 1847–1848.

Thomson was born at Edinburgh, Scotland. His tutor was Joseph Lowe.

His father was John Deas Thomson, born in Edinburgh and his mother was Rebecca Freer, the daughter of a South Carolina planter. John Deas Thomson was a Commissioner and Accountant-General of the Navy. He was knighted 24 August 1832. He was also a Fellow of the Linnean Society of London and a Fellow of the Royal Society. In 1836, John Deas Thomson is named as the 2nd claimant for £2925 4s 2d in compensation for the release of 172 enslaved people from the Nichola Town Estate in St Kitts following the abolition of slavery in 1833.

== In Australia ==
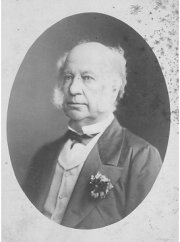
An older Sir Edward Deas Thomson.

Thomson also served as President of the Australian Club in Sydney. During his visit to England he was appointed a Companion of the Order of the Bath (CB) and in 1874 he was created a Knight Commander of St Michael and St George (KCMG)

== Personal life ==
Thomson married Anne Marie Bourke, the second daughter of Governor Sir Richard Bourke, who survived him with two sons and five daughters. His wife, a prominent activist, was one of the founding committee members for women and infant refuge Sydney Founding Institute, now The Infants' Home Child and Family Services. One daughter, Elizabeth, was mother of Edward Grigg, 1st Baron Altrincham; another, Susan Emmeline, married the politician-pastoralist William John Macleay, while another Eglantine Julia, married the politician William Campbell. His son, George Gipps Deas Thomson, was in 1870 a co-founder of the Wallaroo Football Club in Sydney, the NSW colony's first rugby union club.

A portrait of Thomson is in the great hall of the University of Sydney. Thomson died on 16 July 1879 in Sydney.

== See also ==
- Members of the New South Wales Legislative Council
- Thomson River
- The Wool Road (New South Wales)
- Vincentia, New South Wales

Political offices
Preceded by Alexander Macleay	Colonial Secretary of New South Wales; 2 January 1837 – 5 June 1856	Succeeded by Stuart Donaldson
Academic offices
Preceded by Francis Merewether	Vice-Chancellor of the University of Sydney; 1863–1865	Succeeded by John Plunkett
Preceded by Francis Merewether	Chancellor of the University of Sydney; 1865–1878	Succeeded by William Montagu Manning
