= Australian Club =

Gentlemen's club in Sydney, Australia

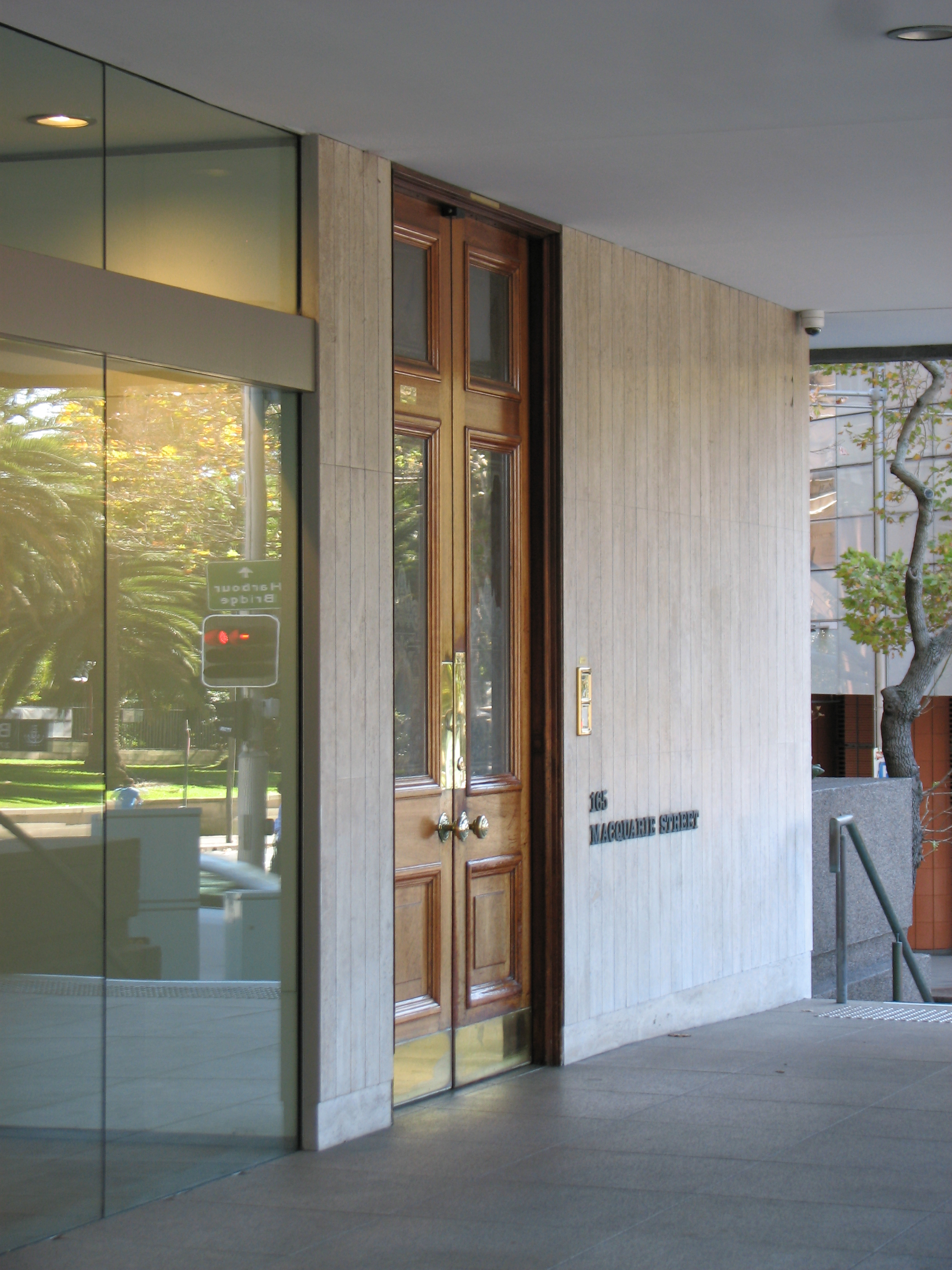
- Australian Club, 165 Macquarie Street, Sydney, New South Wales
- Formation: 1838
- Location: 165 Macquarie Street, Sydney
- Coordinates: 33°51′57″S 151°12′44″E
- Website: Australian Club

The Australian Club is a private club founded in 1838 and located in Sydney at 165 Macquarie Street. Its membership is men-only and it is the oldest and most prestigious gentlemen's club in the southern hemisphere.

"The Club provides excellent dining facilities, en-suite bedrooms and apartments, a fully equipped gym, and on Level 7 of the building in which the Clubhouse is located, are first rate business facilities which Members and resident guests may access."

== Reciprocities with other clubs ==
- Melbourne Club (Melbourne)
- Athenaeum Club (Melbourne)
- The Australian Club (Melbourne)
- Boodle's (London)
- Brooks's (London)
- Garrick Club (London)
- New Club (Edinburgh)
- Knickerbocker Club (New York)
- Union Club (New York)
- Metropolitan Club (Washington D.C.)
- Somerset Club (Boston)
- Philadelphia Club (Philadelphia)
- Pacific-Union Club (San Francisco)
- Circolo della Caccia (Rome)
- Circolo Nazionale dell'Unione (Naples)
- Domino Club (Bologna)
- Circolo Società dell'Unione (Venice)
- Jockey-Club de Paris (Paris)
- Jockey Club für Österreich (Vienna)
- Nuevo Club (Madrid)
- Haagsche Club (The Hague)
- Kildare Street & University Club (Dublin)
- Wellington Club (Wellington)
- Tokyo Club (Tokyo)

== Presidents ==
1. Hon Alexander Macleay MLC FLS FRS 1838–1848
2. Hon Campbell Drummond Riddell 1848–1856
3. Hon Sir Edward Deas-Thomson KCMG CB MLC 1857–1879
4. Hon Sir William Macarthur MLC 1879–1882
5. Christopher Rolleston CMG 1882–1888
6. Edward Merewether FRGS 1888–1893
7. Hon Philip Gidley King MLC 1894–1900
8. Hon Sir Francis Bathurst Suttor MLC 1900–1908
9. Hon Henry Edward Kater MLC 1909–1924
10. John Archibald Anderson 1924–1933
11. Major-General Hon James William Macarthur-Onslow VD MLC 1933–1936
12. William Deuchar Gordon 1936–1939
13. Pat Hamilton Osborne 1939–1942
14. Hon Sir Colin Sinclair KBE MLC 1942–1945
15. Hon Sir Norman William Kater MLC 1945–1948
16. Edmund Irving Body 1948–1951
17. Hon Sir Colin Sinclair KBE MLC 1951–1954
18. John Gordon Crowther 1954–1957
19. Edmund Irving Body CBE 1957–1959
20. John Gordon Crowther 1959–1960
21. Rt Hon Sir Victor Windeyer KBE, CB, DSO, ED, QC 1960–1963
22. Donald Brian Hardy Arnott 1963–1966
23. Major-General Sir Denzil Macarthur-Onslow CBE DSO ED 1966–1969
24. Sir Norman Lethbridge Cowper CBE 1969–1972
25. Sir William Morrow DSO ED 1972–1975
26. Peter Gordon Sayers 1975–1978
27. Graham Marriott Thorp MC 1978–1981
28. Louis Walter Davies A0 1981–1984
29. Hon Sir John Bryan Munro Fuller 1984–1987
30. Alam Hamilton Loxton AM 1987–1990
31. Brian Cameron France 1990–1993
32. Peter John Watt 1993–1996
33. David Hardy Playfair MBE ED 1996–1999
34. Robert Lee Maple–Brown AO 1999–2002
35. Peter Ross Graham QC 2002–2005
36. Roderick Murchison Hume Kater 2005–2008
37. Charles Frederick Moore 2008–2011
38. Richard Hamilton Fisher AM 2011

== Membership ==
At least 5 former Prime Ministers have been members of the club including recently, John Howard and Malcolm Turnbull.

Women are excluded from membership of the club; although they are welcome as guests in most areas and at most functions hosted by the club. For over a century the club has had a friendly albeit informal relationship with the women-only Queen's Club, where many of the members' mothers, wives and sisters are members. The committees of each club take turns to host the other to a formal dinner on an annual basis.

In June 2021, around 700 members attended a Special General Meeting of the club to vote on a proposal to allow women to join the club. Seventy-five percent of attending members needed to vote for the proposal in order for it to receive approval. The proposal was defeated when only 38 percent voted in favour of allowing women to join, falling well short of the 75 per cent required.

== Website ==
The club website is titled 165 Macquarie Street but is only accessible to members.

== See also ==
- Australian Club (Melbourne)
- White's
- List of India's gentlemen's clubs
- List of London's Gentleman's clubs
