= Christopher Rolleston =

Christopher Rolleston CMG
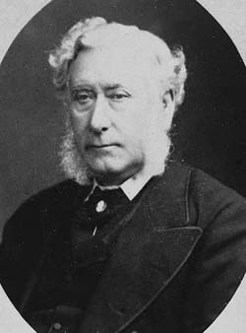
- Christopher Rolleston

Registrar-General of New South Wales
- In office 1855–1864

Auditor-General of New South Wales
- In office 1864–1883
- Preceded by: William Mayne
- Succeeded by: Edward Rennie

Personal details
- Born: 27 July 1817 Watnall, Nottinghamshire, England
- Died: 9 April 1888 (aged 70)
- Occupation: Civil servant

Christopher Rolleston CMG (27 July 1817 – 9 April 1888) was an English-born colonial public servant in Australia.

Rolleston was born 27 July 1817 in Watnall, Nottinghamshire, the second son of Rev. John Rolleston and Elizabeth, née Smelt.

A prominent colonial civil servant in New South Wales, Rolleston served as the Register-General of New South Wales (1855 – 1864). During his time as registrar general he was responsible for the launch of compulsory registration of births, deaths and marriages. He also served in a range of previous roles including Commissioner of Crown Lands in the Darling Downs (1842-1853), private secretary to the Governor of New South Wales, Sir William Denison (1855), as well as auditor-general (1864-1883).

His commercial appointments included director, European Assurance Society, the Mercantile Bank of Sydney and the Australian Gas Light Company, and a superannuation fund commissioner.

He served as the president and later a trustee of the Australian Club. For his lifelong service to colonial New South Wales he was appointed CMG in 1879.

== Legacy ==
A number of places in Queensland are named after him:

- The town of Rolleston in the Central Highlands Region (24.4631°S 148.6236°E)
- Mount Rolleston (27.7983°S 151.7178°E) in Felton in the Toowoomba Region on the Darling Downs

== Publications ==
- The Condition and Resources of New South Wales — A lecture delivered at Sydney, December 12, 1866. (1867)

Political offices
Preceded by William Mayne	Auditor-General of New South Wales; 1864–1883	Succeeded by Edward Rennie
