= Philip H. Nicklin =

American bookseller and writer

Philip Houlbrooke Nicklin (1786 – 2 March 1842) was an American bookseller, publisher and writer. In 1829, Nicklin was elected to the American Philosophical Society. In 1834, a trustee himself, he reported to the trustees of the University of Pennsylvania "concerning the universities of Oxford and Cambridge in England".

Philip H. Nicklin, an eminent bookseller and scholar, born in Philadelphia in 1786, received a collegiate education at Nassau Hall, whence he graduated, in 1804, in the class with Theodore Frelinghuysen, LL.D., Alfred Ely, D.D., Joseph R. Ingersoll, LL.D., Philip Lindsly, D.D., Nathaniel S. Prime, D.D., and Samuel L. Southard, LL.D., one of the most distinguished classes ever sent forth from that institution. Mr. Nicklin first studied law, but after the death of his father, in 1807, on account of pecuniary considerations, he resolved to embark in .mercantile pursuits. Accordingly, in 1809, he became a bookseller, first in Baltimore, and then, in 1814, at Philadelphia. Subsequently, in the year 1827, his business was exclusively confined to law books. In 1839, having acquired a competency, he retired from business, and spent his time in literary enjoyment, which was his favorite pursuit. He became a member of the American Philosophical Society, and a Trustee of the University of Pennsylvania. He contributed several articles on American Conchology to " Silliman’s Journal," and also occasionally to other periodicals. When a Trustee of the University of Pennsylvania he visited England. On his return, in 1834, he made a learned report to the Board, of which he was a member, on the condition of the Universities at Cambridge and at Oxford. He also published " Letters Descriptive of the Virginia Springs;" " A Pleasant Peregrination through the Prettiest Part of Pennsylvania;" " Remarks on Literary Property;" and various papers on " Free Trade." He manifested great interest in the cause of free trade; was a member of the Free Trade Convention which met at Philadelphia in 1831; and was the author of the Exposition of the Operation of the Tariff System, in Relation to Books, Bookbinding, Frmting, and Printing Paper," which was published among the documents annexed to the public report of that Convention. Mr. Nicklin was also an active member of several charitable societies, particularly of the missionary and other societies connected with the Protestant Episcopal Church, of which he was a devoted friend. In the midst of his public usefulness, and without the premonitions of gradual decay in health, Mr. Nicklin died suddenly, at Philadelphia, March 2d, 1842, aged fifty-six years.

Nicklin studied at Nassau Hall graduating in 1804. He died suddenly in Philadelphia in 1842.

== Bibliography ==
- Letters Descriptive of the Virginia Springs (1835) (as Peregrine Prolix)
- A Pleasant Peregrination Through the Prettiest Parts of Pennsylvania (1836) (as Peregrine Prolix)
- A Report Made to the Board of Trustees of the University of Pennsylvania, etc... (1834)
- Remarks on Literary Property incorporating work by Joseph Lowe
