= William Mayne (Australian politician) =

Australian politician

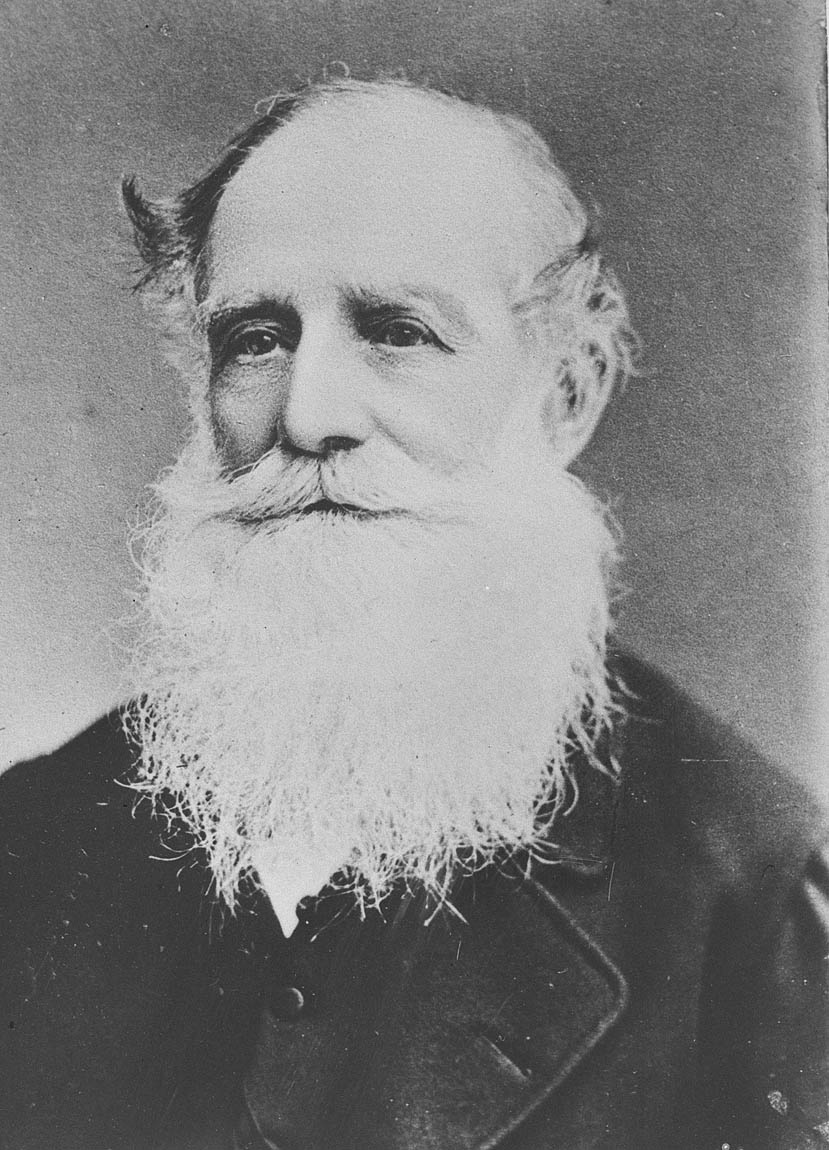
William Colburn Mayne

William Colburn Mayne (22 July 1808 – 31 August 1902) was an Irish-born Australian politician.

He was born in Dublin to Captain John Mayne and Theodosia Colburn. He joined the 5th Regiment of Foot in 1825 as an ensign, and was promoted lieutenant the following year. He married Mary Ellen Turner in 1831; they had eleven children. In 1833 he was promoted captain, and he retired in 1838. He migrated to New South Wales in 1839 and spent time on various pastoral properties before becoming Commissioner of Crown Lands for the Wellington district in 1846.

From 1852 to 1856 he was Inspector-General of Police, during which time he was also a member of the New South Wales Legislative Council. He was appointed to the reconstituted Council in 1856 and was the first to lead the Government in that body, representing Premier Stuart Donaldson. He left the Council in August 1856 to become Auditor-General, and from 1864 was the first Agent-General for New South Wales in London, a position he held until 1871.

Mayne died in Sydney on 31 August 1902 (aged 94).

Political offices
| New office | Representative of the Government in the Legislative Council; 1856 | Succeeded by Alfred Lutwyche |
Government offices
| Preceded by Terence Murray | Auditor-General of New South Wales; 1856 – 1864 | Succeeded by Christopher Rolleston |
Diplomatic posts
| New office | Agent-General for New South Wales; 1864 – 1871 | Succeeded by Charles Cowper |
