= Syd Einfeld =

Australian politician (1909–1995)

Syd Einfeld AO
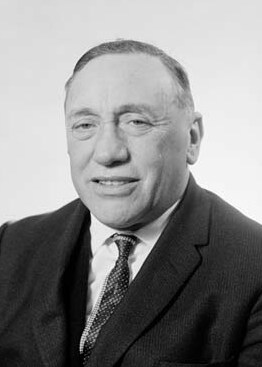

Member of the New South Wales Parliament for Waverley
- In office 13 February 1971 – 19 September 1981
- Preceded by: District established
- Succeeded by: Ernie Page

Member of the New South Wales Parliament for Bondi
- In office 6 November 1965 – 13 February 1971
- Preceded by: Abe Landa
- Succeeded by: District abolished

Member of the Australian Parliament for Phillip
- In office 9 December 1961 – 30 November 1963
- Preceded by: William Aston
- Succeeded by: William Aston

Personal details
- Born: 17 June 1909 Kings Cross, New South Wales, Australia
- Died: 16 June 1995 (aged 85) Woollahra, New South Wales, Australia
- Party: Labor
- Children: Marcus Einfeld
- Occupation: Company manager

Sydney David Einfeld AO (17 June 1909 – 16 June 1995) was an Australian politician and Jewish community leader. Einfeld is credited with changing Australia's immigration policy to provide a refuge for Holocaust survivors. As a result, Australia accepted more refugees per capita than any other country in the world, and more Jewish refugees than anywhere except Israel.

== Early life ==
He was born in Sydney in 1909, three weeks after his parents arrived in Australia – hence his name, Sydney. He was the son of Rabbi Marcus Einfeld (1874–1937) who came to Australia in 1909 (becoming the chazan and the Second Minister of the Great Synagogue) by way of London, England, which he had immigrated to from Jarosław in Galicia, with his wife Deborah (Gabel) Einfeld (d. 1957).

Einfeld attended Bourke Street Public School and Paddington Public School before completing his secondary education at Fort Street Boys High School. After leaving school he worked as a salesman and became manager of a merchandising company. He was active in various Jewish community groups from a young age, including as an inaugural member of the New South Wales Jewish Board of Deputies in 1945.

== Political life ==
Einfeld is the man credited with changing Australia's immigration policy after World War II to provide a refuge for Holocaust survivors. As a result, Australia accepted more refugees per capita than any other country in the world, and more Jewish refugees than anywhere except Israel. In 1948, Einfeld was elected to the Board of the Australian Jewish Welfare Society. In 1952 he was elected President of the Australian Jewish Welfare and Relief Societies. He held the position for 25 years. He was also President of the Executive Council of Australian Jewry between 1953 and 1954, 1957–58, and 1961–62.

In 1961, he was elected to the Australian House of Representatives as the Labor member for Phillip, defeating Liberal MP William Aston. At the time, he was only the fourth Jew to be elected to the Commonwealth Parliament. He was defeated by Aston in 1963. The Australian Council for International Development, an independent national association of Australian non-government organisations working in the field of international aid and development, was founded in 1965 with Einfeld as chairman.

In 1965 he was elected to the New South Wales Legislative Assembly for the seat of Bondi at a by-election. In 1966 he became Deputy Leader of the Opposition. In 1971 he transferred from Bondi to the seat of Waverley. He was New South Wales Minister for Consumer Affairs in the Wran Government from 1976 to 1984, when he retired from politics. In 1982 he was made an Officer of the Order of Australia.

== Personal life ==
Einfeld died in 1995, at 85 years of age. A major bypass road in Bondi Junction is named Syd Einfeld Drive.

He married Billie (Rosabelle) Appelboom on 2 June 1934 in the Great Synagogue, whereupon they lived in Newcastle, New South Wales, and had one son, Marcus, and a daughter, Robyn. His son Marcus Einfeld was a judge of the Federal Court of Australia from 1986 to 2001.

Parliament of Australia
Preceded by William Aston	Member for Phillip; 1961–1963	Succeeded by William Aston
New South Wales Legislative Assembly
Preceded by Abe Landa	Member for Bondi; 1965–1971	District abolished
New district	Member for Waverley; 1971–1981	Succeeded by Ernie Page
