= Timothy Augustine Coghlan =

Australian statistician, engineer and diplomat

Sir Timothy Coghlan KCMG ISO FRSS MICE
- Born: 9 June 1856; Sydney, Colony of New South Wales
- Died: 30 April 1926 (aged 69); London, England
- Education: Cleveland Street Public School; Sydney Grammar School
- Occupations: Public servant, diplomat
- Spouse: Helen Donnelly (m. 1897–1926)
- Children: Austin Coghlan; Eden Coghlan

Sir Timothy Augustine Coghlan KCMG ISO FRSS MICE (9 June 1856 – 30 April 1926) was an Australian statistician, engineer, economic historian and diplomat. He held the post of New South Wales government statistician for 19 years, and served various periods as Agent-General for New South Wales in London from 1905 to his death in 1926.

== Early life ==
Coghlan was born in Sydney, the second son of Thomas Coghlan of Irish Roman Catholic extraction. He was educated at Cleveland Street Public School and Sydney Grammar School, and in 1873 joined the public works department, becoming assistant-engineer of harbours and rivers in 1884.

== Other work ==
In December 1905, Coghlan was offered the chance to become the inaugural Commonwealth Statistician, heading the newly created Commonwealth Bureau of Census and Statistics. In February 1906, he informed Prime Minister Alfred Deakin that he could not accept the offer due to his obligations to the Premier of New South Wales, Joseph Carruthers. He later told Deakin that Carruthers had threatened to withdraw his pension entitlements if he accepted the federal position.

In 1912 he represented New South Wales at the First International Eugenics Conference in London.

On 15 December 1914, Banjo Paterson reports he was in London when he:

Dropped in for a chat with Sir T.A. Coghlan, our agent-general for New South Wales. As unemotional as a professional billiard player, and as self-reliant as a sea captain, Coghlan has battled his way from a minor civil service job to his present position through sheer ability.

It has been said of his work Labour and Industry in Australia from the first Settlement in 1788 to the Establishment of the Commonwealth in 1901:

This document provided the first great economic history of Australia, covering the period from European settlement to the creation of the Commonwealth … [its] 2449 pages constitute a great, pullulating Victorian panorama in words and numbers that seemingly capture every person, law and landmark … Beyond its use as an encyclopedic reference work, its enduring value lies in its bounty of quantitive data. Much of the latter proved an essential input into estimates of national accounts, other elements remain standing in their own right, with Coghlan's figures for gold production remaining unsuperceded. And posterity has ultimately granted him his famous claim to use his own name as the authority for the statistics he cites.

Coghlan was serving as Agent-General when he died suddenly at London on 30 April 1926. His funeral was held at St Mary's, Cadogan Street.

In 1897 he married Helen Donnelly (d. 1936), the daughter of Denis Donnelly, who survived him with a son, Austin, and a daughter, Eden. Coghlan left them an estate of the value of £43,197. Coghlan was awarded the Imperial Service Order (ISO) in 1903, was knighted in 1914 and created a Knight Commander of the Order of St Michael and St George (KCMG) in 1918.

Government offices
New title	Government Statistician of New South Wales; 1886–1905	Succeeded by William Heney Hall
Diplomatic posts
Preceded by The Earl of Jersey	Agent-General for New South Wales; 1905–1915	Succeeded by Bernhard Wise
Preceded by Bernhard Wise	Agent-General for New South Wales; 1916–1917	Succeeded by Sir Charles Wade
Preceded by David Hall	Agent-General for New South Wales; 1920–1925	Succeeded by Sir Arthur Cocks
Preceded by Sir Arthur Cocks	Agent-General for New South Wales; 1925–1926	Succeeded by Edward McTiernan
