= Campbell Riddell =

Australian politician

Campbell Drummond Riddell (9 January 1796 – 1858) was an Australian colonial public servant who served as the first Colonial Treasurer of New South Wales.

== Life ==
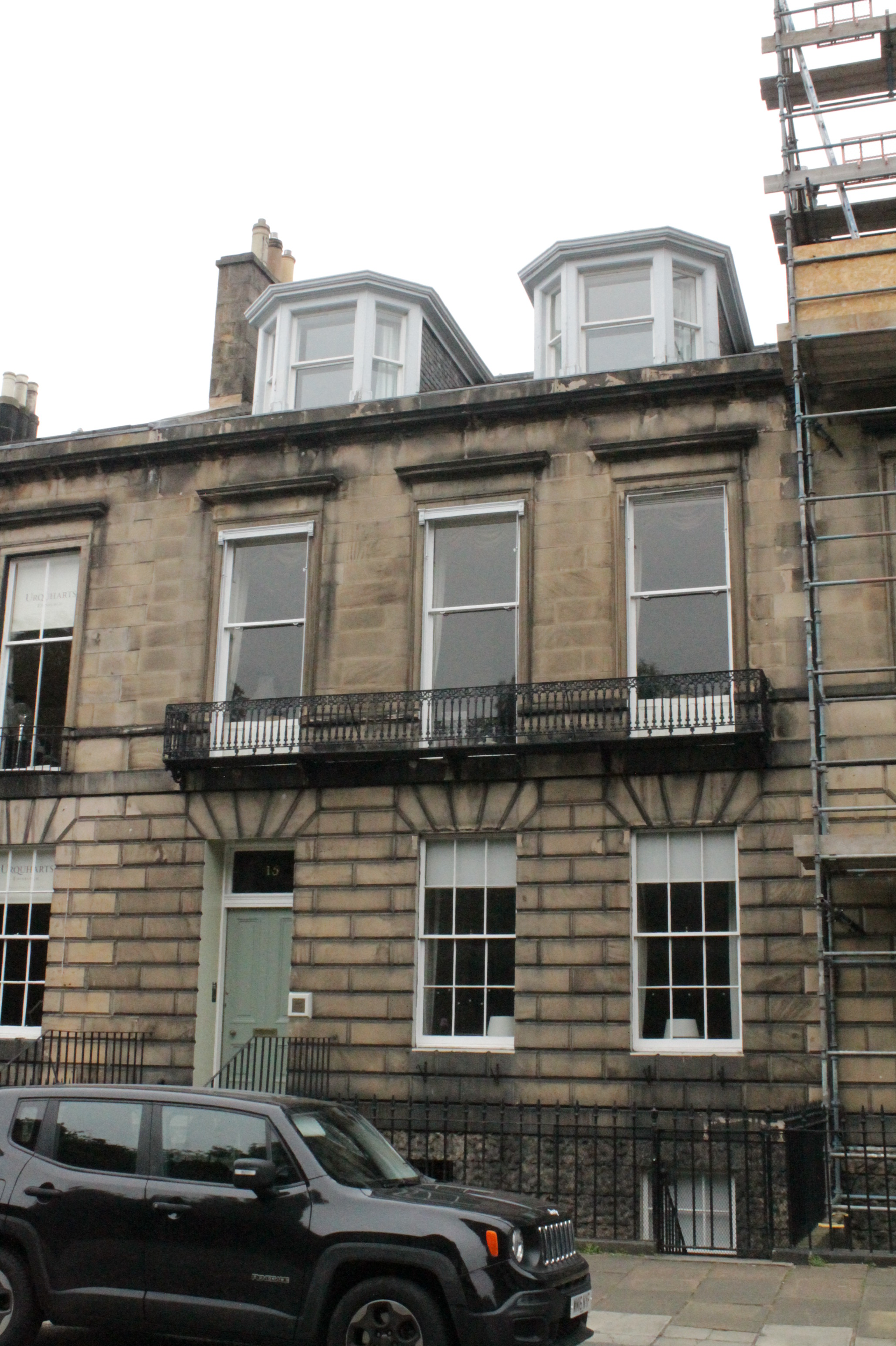
Townhouse at 15 Heriot Row, Edinburgh

Riddell was the son of Thomas Milles Riddell (d.1796) and Margaretta, née Campbell. He was the grandson of Sir James Riddell Bt who was created first baronet, of Ardnamurchan, Argyllshire, Scotland. He was brought up in Edinburgh living at 15 Heriot Row.

He was educated at Christ Church, Oxford, but he did not take a degree. Upon joining the Colonial Service he briefly served in Ceylon, where he met and married his wife, before being appointed the Colonial Treasurer for the Colony of New South Wales, arriving in Sydney in August 1830.

As treasurer, Riddell was appointed a member of the Executive Council on 25 June 1831. The Legislative Council was expanded in 1843 to include 24 elected members, the treasurer was one of the 6 members appointed by virtue of their office. Riddell was retired as treasurer under the provisions of the new constitution with the introduction of responsible government in 1856 and was replaced by Thomas Holt.

Riddell was appointed to the Legislative Council in 1856. He traveled to England and his seat was vacated by his absence on 8 December 1858.

He also served as President of the Australian Club.

He died in England in 1858.

Political offices
Preceded by William Balcombe	Colonial Treasurer of New South Wales; 1830-1856	Succeeded by Thomas Holt
