= Norman Thomas (Australian politician) =

Australian politician

Norman Thomas (14 March 1894 – ?) was an Australian politician.

He was born at Byrock to grazier Charles Edward Thomas and Mary Jane, née Patterson. He attended public schools at Narromine, Parramatta and Kensington before studying at Stott and Hoare's Business College. He worked various jobs including a jackeroo at Trangie, a station overseer at Walgett, and a sheep farmer. From 1916 to 1919 he served in the Australian Flying Corps as an air mechanic. On 8 March 1924 he married Josephine Fagan, with whom he had three daughters. Thomas moved to Bondi around 1930 as an investor and property owner. In 1932 he was elected to the New South Wales Legislative Assembly as the United Australia Party member for Bondi, serving until his defeat in 1941. He served in the Royal Australian Air Force from 1940 to 1945 as a flight lieutenant.

New South Wales Legislative Assembly
Preceded by Abe Landa	Member for Bondi; 1932–1941	Succeeded by Abe Landa
