= Jock Pagan =

Australian businessman

Brigadier Sir Jock Pagan CMG, MBE, ED

Federal President of the Liberal Party of Australia
- In office 9 November 1965 – 9 June 1970
- Preceded by: Philip McBride
- Succeeded by: Robert Southey

Personal details
- Born: John Ernest Pagan; 13 May 1914 Killara, New South Wales, Australia
- Died: 26 June 1986 (aged 72) Camperdown, New South Wales, Australia
- Party: Liberal
- Spouse: Marjorie Hoskins (m. 1948)
- Occupation: Businessman
- Civilian awards: Knight Bachelor; Companion of the Order of St Michael and St George

Military service
- Allegiance: Australia
- Branch/service: Citizen Military Forces; Second Australian Imperial Force
- Years of service: 1936–1945; 1948–1959
- Rank: Brigadier
- Commands: 1st Light Anti-Aircraft Regiment
- Battles/wars: Second World War
- Military awards: Member of the Order of the British Empire; Efficiency Decoration

Brigadier Sir John Ernest "Jock" Pagan, CMG, MBE, ED (13 May 1914 – 26 June 1986) was an Australian businessman, soldier and political figure. He had a long association with the Liberal Party of Australia including as state president of the New South Wales branch from 1963 to 1966 and federal president from 1965 to 1970. He was later Agent-General for New South Wales in London from 1970 to 1973.

== Early life ==
Pagan was born on 13 May 1914 in Killara, New South Wales. He was the son of Hilda (née Rowe) and David Clark Pagan, a civil engineer. He grew up in Hay, New South Wales, where his father was chief engineer for the Hay Shire. He began his education at a local public school and then boarded at St Peter's College, Adelaide.

== Military service ==
Pagan joined the Citizen Military Forces in 1936. On the outbreak of the Second World War in 1939, he was commissioned into the Royal Australian Artillery's 5th Heavy Brigade. He saw active service on the Western Desert campaign with the 9th Division, including at the First and Second Battles of El Alamein. He later served in New Guinea and as a senior instructor. Pagan was discharged from the regular army in 1945 and rejoined the Citizen Military Forces when it was re-raised in 1948, retiring with the rank of brigadier in 1959.

== Personal life ==
In 1948, Pagan married Marjorie Hoskins, the youngest daughter of industrialist Cecil Hoskins. The couple had three children.
