= Quebec Government Offices =

International delegations of the Canadian province

Quebec's diplomatic missions General Delegations Delegations Offices

The Quebec Government Offices (French: Délégations générales du Québec) are the Government of Quebec's official representations outside of Canada. They are overseen by Quebec's Ministry of International Relations.

The network of 35 offices in 20 countries consists of 9 general delegations, 5 delegations, 15 government bureaux and 6 trade offices. There are also 2 representatives at the Organisation internationale de la Francophonie and UNESCO.

== History ==
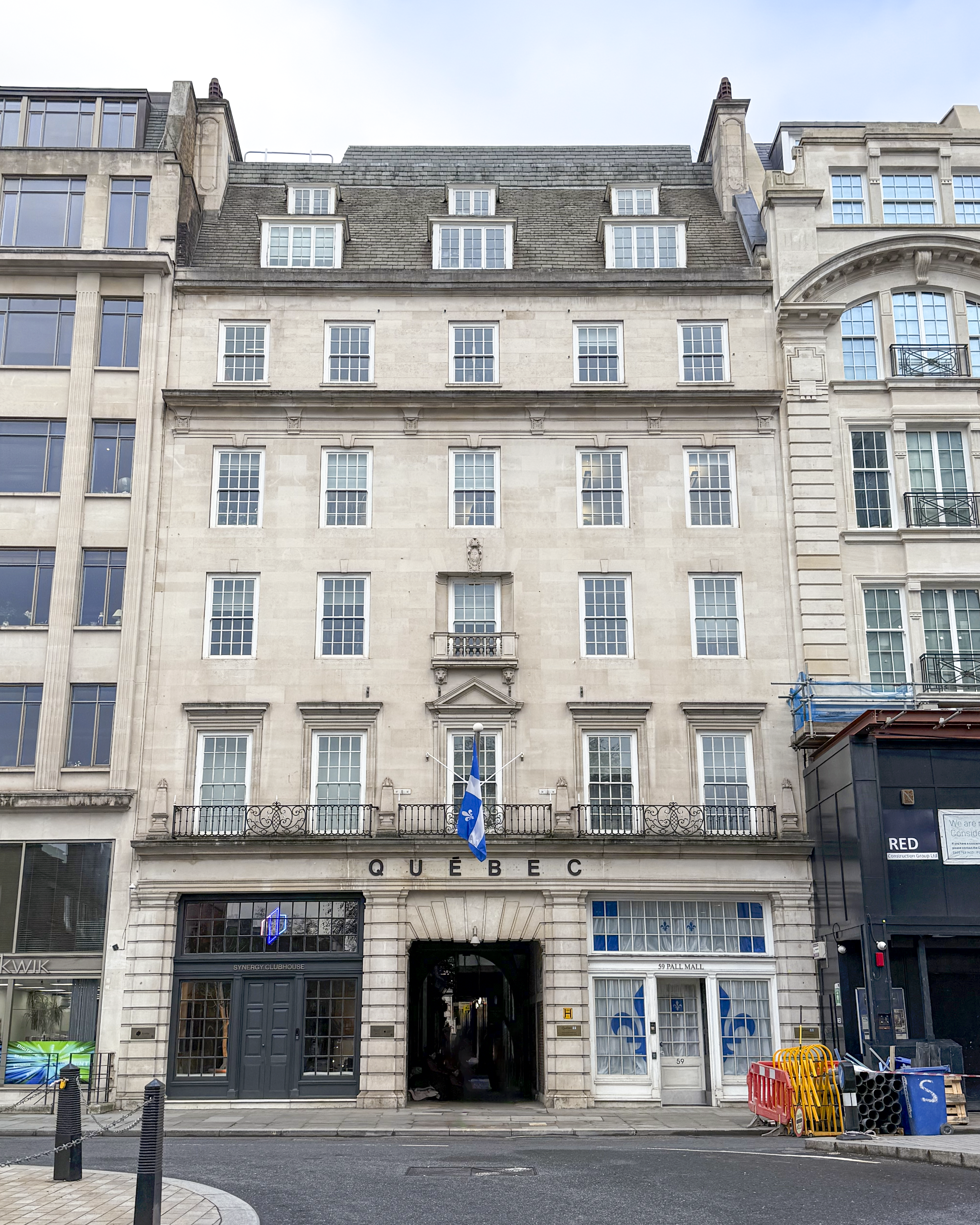
The Quebec Government Office at 59 Pall Mall in London, England

Quebec had agents-general in London, Paris, and Brussels prior to 1936, when legislation was passed by the government of Maurice Duplessis closing all Quebec government offices abroad. The government of Adélard Godbout repealed the legislation and opened an office in New York City in 1940. When Duplessis returned to power in 1944, his government retained the New York City office and its agent-general but opened no others.

In the early 1960s, the government of Jean Lesage began to open additional offices abroad in Paris (1961), London (1962), Rome and Milan (1965). Subsequent governments opened offices in Chicago (1969), Boston, Lafayette, Dallas and Los Angeles (1970), Munich and Berlin (1971), Brussels (1972), Atlanta (1977), Washington, DC (1978), Mexico City and Tokyo (1980), Beijing and Santiago (1998), Shanghai and Barcelona (1999), Mumbai (2007), São Paulo (2008) and Moscow (2012). A UQAM scholar in 1984 described the offices as "mini-embassies" for Quebec and part of the Quiet Revolution.

In 1971, the title of agent-general was officially changed to delegate-general, although the previous title is still often used, particularly for the government's representative to London.

As of 2024, the Government of Quebec is represented by 35 offices in 20 countries and has delegates-general (agents-general), delegates, bureaux, and trade offices. Québec also has a delegate for the Organisation internationale de la Francophonie and Multilateral Affairs and a representative to UNESCO, both based in Paris. Quebec, like other Canadian provinces, also maintains representatives in some Canadian embassies and consulates general.

== List of Quebec Government Offices ==
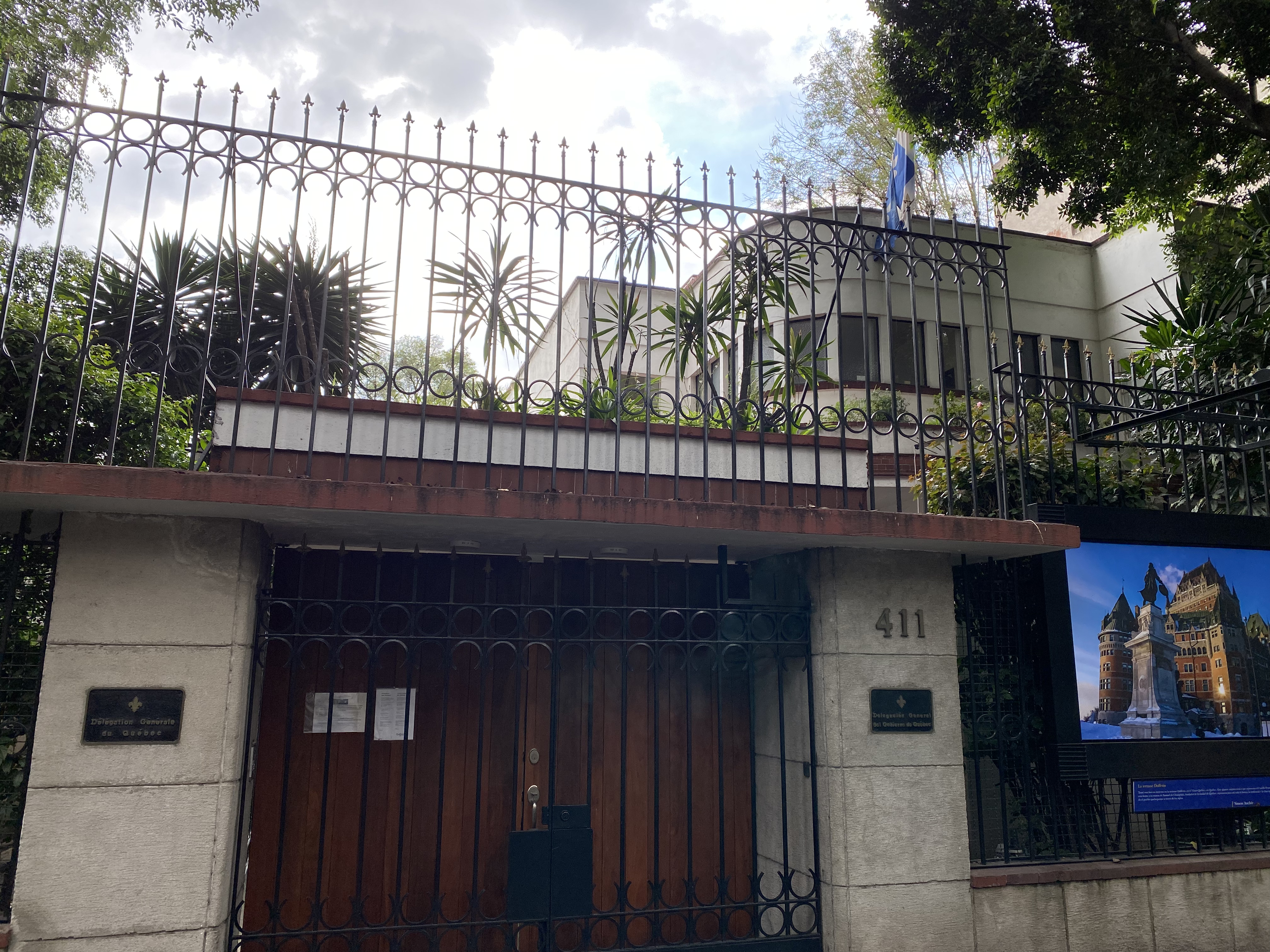
General Delegation of Quebec in Mexico City

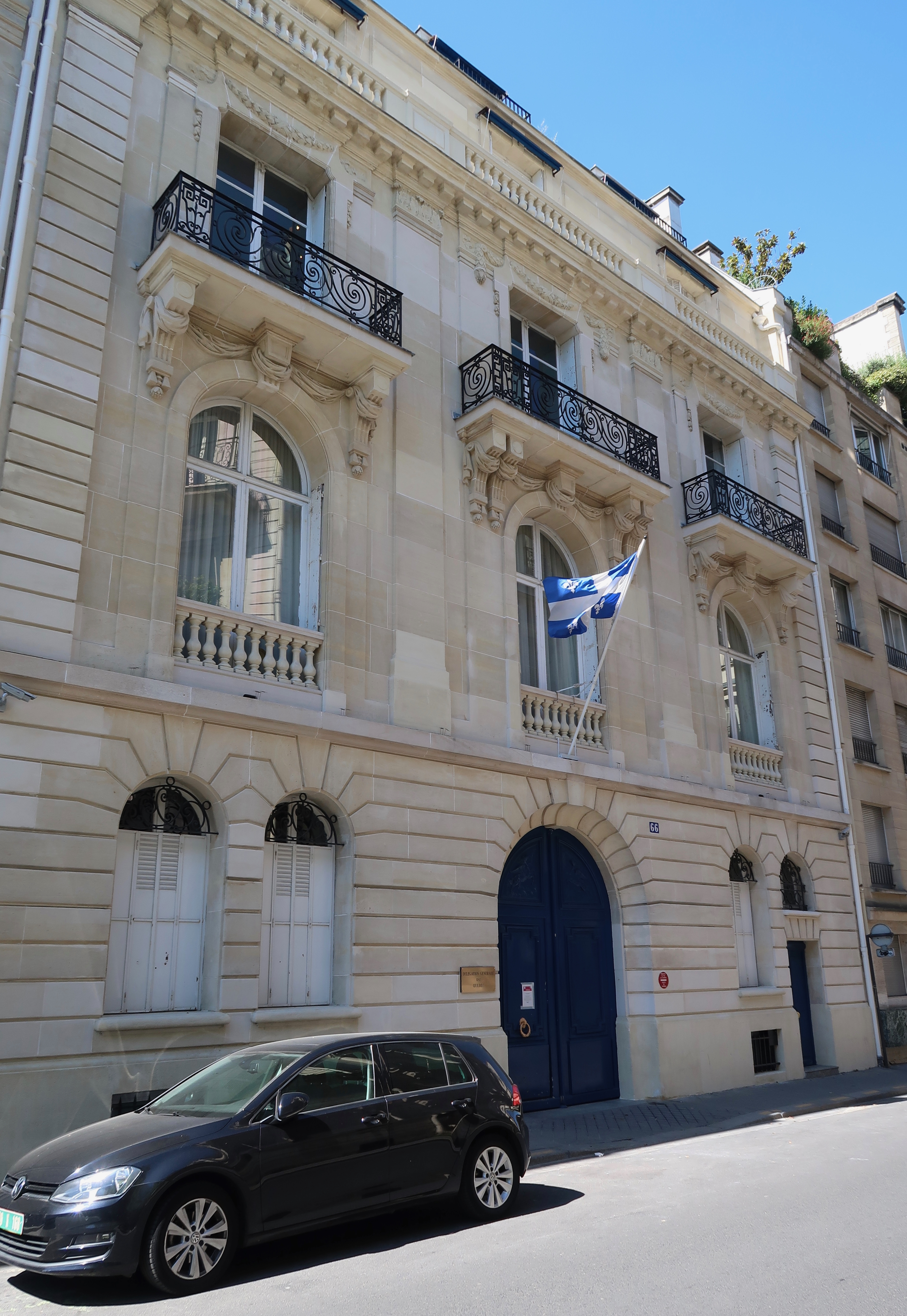
General Delegation of Quebec in Paris

Quebec Government Offices fall into several types. General Delegations are deemed most important, and handle affairs of economy, education, culture, immigration, and public affairs. Delegations are similar, but do not deal with immigration issues. Bureaus handle a small number of issues. Trade Offices deal with trade affairs.

City	Country	Type of Office
Brussels	Belgium	General Delegation
Dakar	Senegal	General Delegation
London	United Kingdom	General Delegation
Los Angeles	United States	General Delegation
Mexico City	Mexico	General Delegation
Munich	Germany	General Delegation
New York City	United States	General Delegation
Paris	France	General Delegation
Tokyo	Japan	General Delegation
Atlanta	United States	Delegation
Boston	United States	Delegation
Chicago	United States	Delegation
Houston	United States	Delegation
Miami	United States	Delegation
Rome	Italy	Delegation
Seoul	South Korea	Delegation
Singapore	Singapore	Delegation
Washington	United States	Delegation
Abidjan	Ivory Coast	Bureau
Barcelona	Spain	Bureau
Beijing	China	Bureau
Bogotá	Colombia	Bureau
Mumbai	India	Bureau
Rabat	Morocco	Bureau
São Paulo	Brazil	Bureau
Shanghai	China	Bureau
Tel Aviv	Israel	Bureau
Berlin	Germany	Trade Office
Milan	Italy	Trade Office
Qingdao	China	Trade Office
Shenzhen	China	Trade Office
Silicon Valley	United States	Trade Office
