= Electoral district of Bondi =

Former state electoral district of New South Wales, Australia

Bondi was an electoral district of the Legislative Assembly in the Australian state of New South Wales, originally created in 1913 and named after and including the Sydney suburb of Bondi. In 1920, with the introduction of proportional representation, it was absorbed into Eastern Suburbs. Bondi was recreated in 1927 and abolished in 1971 and partly replaced by Waverley.

== Members ==
First incarnation (1913–1920)
Member	Party	Term
James Macarthur-Onslow	Liberal Reform	1913–1917
James Macarthur-Onslow	Nationalist	1917–1920
Second incarnation (1927–1971)
Member	Party	Term
Harold Jaques	Nationalist	1927–1930
Abe Landa	Labor	1930–1932
Norman Thomas	United Australia	1932–1941
Abe Landa	Labor	1941–1965
Syd Einfeld	Labor	1965–1971
