= St Andrew's College, University of Sydney =

University college in Australia

St Andrew's College
- University of Sydney
- Location: 19 Carillon Avenue, Newtown, New South Wales, Australia
- Coordinates: 33.891234°S 151.183516°E
- Full name: Saint Andrew's College
- Motto: Christo, Ecclesiae, Litteris (Latin)
- Motto in English: For Christ, the Church and Scholarship
- Established: 1867
- Named for: Saint Andrew the Apostle, patron saint of Scotland
- Sister college: Ormond College
- Principal: Daniel Tyler
- Undergraduates: 350
- Postgraduates: 15
- Website: Website

St Andrew's College is a residential college at the University of Sydney, in the suburb of Newtown, New South Wales, Australia. The college occupies 4 hectares of land within the main campus of the University of Sydney and was built on a sub-grant of University Land. It is home to over 380 male and female undergraduate students, postgraduate students, resident fellows, and graduate residents. The college is governed by its own elected Council and has offered residency, academic, and social support to students for 150 years.

The St Andrew's College Incorporation Act received Royal Assent in 1867 and was replaced by an updated Act in 1998. The college is a non-denominational independent institution of Protestant origins situated upon its own sub-grant of Crown Land and governed by a Council under the St Andrew's College Act 1998. In 2017, the college celebrated its sesquicentenary. In 1870, the College Council first met, and in 1874 the first 16 students began their studies.

The college has produced notable alumni in the fields of business, law, and politics. Known as Androvians, alumni include, but are not limited to: H. V. Bert (Doc) Evatt (President of the United Nations), Andrew Constance (Politician), Angus Taylor (Politician), John Bradfield (Architect of Sydney Harbour Bridge), Rohan Browning (Athlete) and more.

== History ==
St Andrew's College was incorporated by Act of Parliament and received Royal Assent from Queen Victoria on 12 December 1867. The St Andrew's College Act 1998 replaced the St Andrews Incorporation Act 1867. This change meant the Principal may be a member of the laity and the religious affiliation of councillors was broadened to include all Protestants.

Adam Thomson became the first Principal of St Andrew's in 1872. He was a graduate of the University of Edinburgh who had come from his Hawick parish to Sydney in 1861. The College Council first met in 1870 and the first 16 students began their studies in 1874, even before the Main building was completed in 1878. Increasing demand for places led to the opening of additions to the college in 1892 (Sulman Wing), and in 1907 and 1914 (Vaucluse extensions). The student population increased to 140 in 1953 when the Reid building was completed, to 200 when the Thyne building was opened in 1966 and again to 272 when the Hanks Building was completed in 2007.

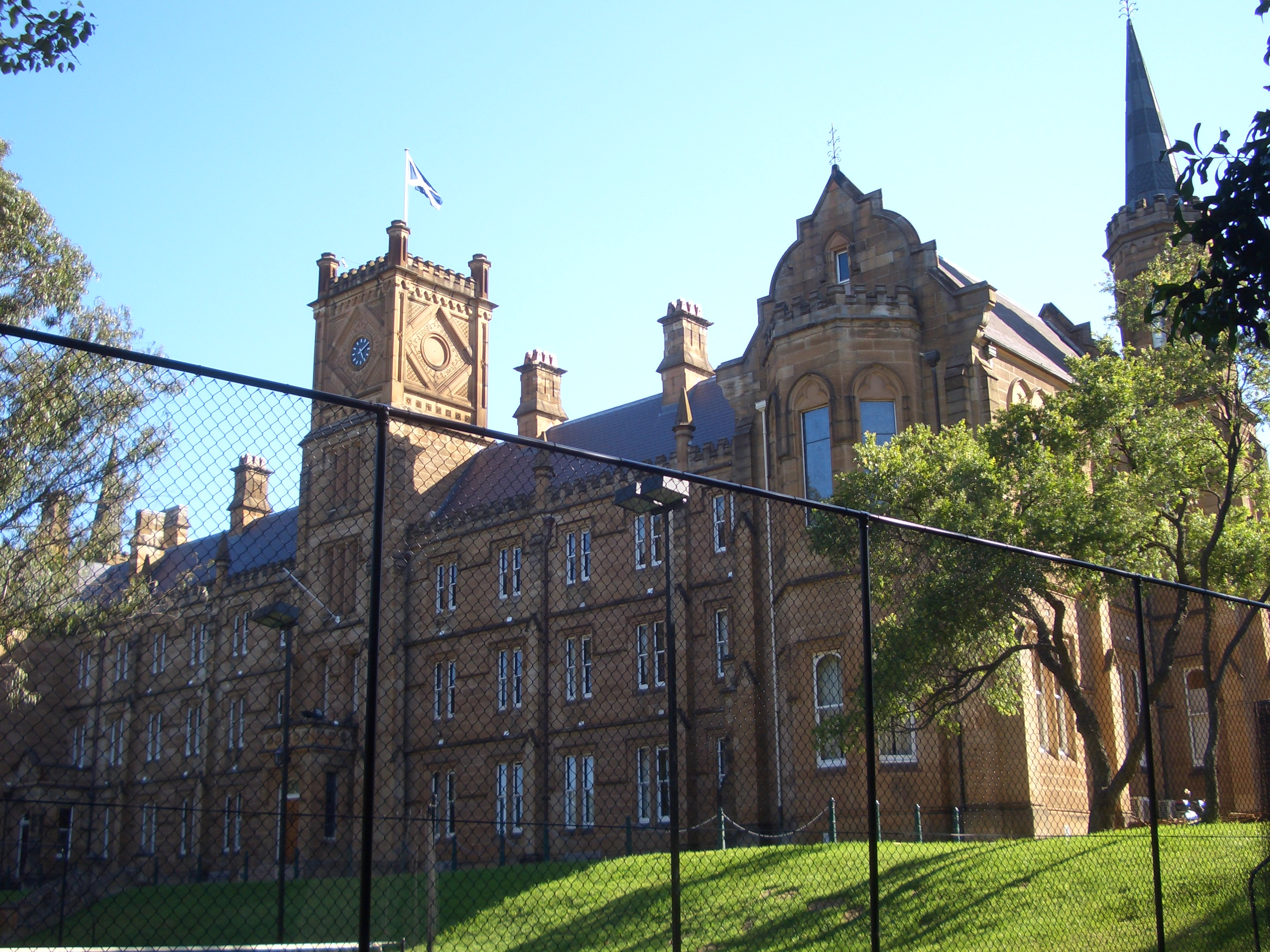
St Andrew's College

Whilst the Theological Hall of the Presbyterian Church in New South Wales, now the Presbyterian Theological Centre, was without a home, St Andrew's College allowed its members to live at the college (until it relocated to Burwood in 1983).

In 2001, the College Council resolved to admit female undergraduates for the first time, with the first such students taking up residence at the commencement of the 2002 academic year.

Its motto Christo, ecclesiae, litteris is Latin for For Christ, for the church, for scholarship.

St Andrew's College is home to 336 male and female undergraduate and graduate students and resident Fellows. All of the undergraduate students are members of the Students' Club, and the Junior Common Room. These are governed by an elected body of students, the House Committee. The college is also home to 22 graduate students who are members of the Senior Common Room. They contribute to the college's extensive tutorial program. Residential members of the Senior Common Room are allowed to compete for selection on the college sporting teams. There are also University academics who reside at the college and are members of the Senior Common Room.

=== Heresy Conviction Controversy ===
Scottish born Peter Cameron was appointed Principal of St Andrew's College in 1991, and thus became a minister in the Presbyterian Church of Australia. In 1993 while serving as Principal, Cameron was convicted by the Presbyterian Church of Australia of Heresy. He was charged for disagreeing with the first chapter of the Westminster Confession of Faith (which as a minister of the Presbyterian Church of Australia, he was required "firmly and constantly to adhere thereto and to the utmost of [his] power to maintain and defend") by questioning the writings of Paul in the New Testament. The charge related to a sermon that he preached on 2 March 1992 called 'The Place of Women in the Church' to 300 members of a Presbyterian women's organisation. In the sermon, Cameron supported the ordination of women to the ministry, criticised the Church's hard line on homosexuality, and attacked fundamentalist Christianity in general (Jensen, nd) (de Maria, 1999).

=== Modern Controversies ===
The college, along with other University of Sydney colleges, has encountered a reasonable amount of criticism in recent years over student behavior and culture. Hazing has been a major target of media allegations. Alcoholism, sexism, and racist sentiments as well as a general attitude of entitlement have all been said to be part of the college's culture. In response to these allegations, The college responded to the Broderick Report with a cultural renewal plan (2018–2019), focusing in particular on hazing, alcohol misuse, sexual misconduct, and harassment. Despite this, there have been allegations that many of the same problems continue to exist at St Andrews. In May 2020 graffiti stating "nothing has changed" and "end rape on campus" appeared on the walls of the college in response to continued reports of hazing, sexism, and white nationalism. The college lambasted the defacement of heritage buildings, though acknowledged that "there is nothing unfair about the view that there is more work to be done and new issues to be investigated". In 2021 there were continued media accusations, with claims that the college featured an environment of privilege in which students were partying and disrespecting rules throughout the July COVID-19 lockdown. The student head of college reportedly called the inability to travel between home and college at will throughout the lockdown "stupid", stating that they would attempt to bypass the restrictions.

== Buildings ==
At present the college comprises 4 main buildings as well as a number of smaller ones. "Main" is the oldest of these, and was extended with the addition of the Sulman and Vaucluse wings. Further extensions on Main were carried out in the 1960s, and now it houses 90 students’ rooms, the college's dining hall, library, reading room, Junior and Senior Common Rooms, administration offices, the Kinross-Mackie Chapel and a number of tutorial rooms. The Junior Common Room (JCR) underwent a comprehensive renovation in 2025 to improve student and community facilities, designed by Michiru Higginbotham in collaboration with Nock Architecture. Main predominantly houses freshers and sophomores. "Reid" is the second oldest building, and was opened in 1953, when it was simply known as the New Building. It is typically home to both Sophomores and Seniors. The Thyne Building was opened in 1966, the same year as the college's oval was constructed. This building typically houses freshers and Sophomores. The Hanks Building (referred to by students as "New Wing") was completed in 2007; it is home to only seniors and above.

The college has a number of smaller buildings, such as the Harper Lodge (where members such as the Vice-Principal live), the Dougan Lodge (where the Principal lives), the Old Laboratory (a.k.a. the Country Club, which houses graduates), the Gatehouse and Sulman Wing (graduate housing).

== Principals ==
Principals of St Andrew's College
Dates	Name	Notes
1872–1874	Adam Thomson	
1875–1901	John Kinross	
1902–1920	Andrew Harper	
1920–1937	Edward Erskine Anderson	
1938–1950	William Cumming Thom	
1950–1956	John McIntyre	
1957–1974	Alan A. Dougan	
1975–1987	Hugh Cairns	
1988–1991	Clyde Paton	
1991–1995	Peter Cameron	
1999–2008	William Porges	Dr Porges acted in the role of Principal from 1996
2008–2023	Wayne Erickson	
2023–2024	Rob Leach	
2024–to present	Daniel Tyler	

== Student life ==
=== Sporting ===
Every year, the college men compete for a sporting trophy known as the Rawson Cup, which was presented to the Sydney University Sports Union in 1906 by Admiral Sir Harry Rawson. The cup is fought for throughout the year by men representing each of the University of Sydney Colleges (St John's College, St Paul's College and Wesley College) accumulating points by competing in cricket, rowing, swimming, rugby, tennis, soccer, basketball and athletics. St Andrew's has won the Rawson Cup sixty times since its inception; more often than all the other colleges combined.

Since 2002, the college women have competed for their equivalent sporting trophy, the Macrae Archdale Cup, known as "The Rosebowl". The Rosebowl is contested by the six colleges that admit women. It consists of the sports of rowing, swimming, netball, hockey, tennis, basketball, soccer and athletics. The college won the Rosebowl for the first time in 2006, and then for seventeen consecutive years; 2009, 2010, 2011, 2012, 2013, 2014, 2015, 2016, 2017, 2018, 2019, 2020, 2021, 2022, 2023, 2024 and 2025, making a total of eighteen Rosebowl titles.

=== Arts ===
The college has found major success in the Palladian Cup, the annual inter-college performing arts competition, winning fifteen times. Palladian is contested by the six colleges. They compete in Solo Instrumental, Solo Vocal, Oration, Dance and Solo Drama in semester one and Debating, Vocal Ensemble, Art, Instrumental Ensemble and finally, Drama Ensemble in semester two. Each event has six points available, with three points for first, two points for second and one point for third. It is also customary to present a highly commended, however, this has no points associated with it. St Andrew's won in 2001, 2003, 2005, 2006, 2008, 2009, 2013, 2015, 2017, 2020, 2021, 2022, 2023, 2024, 2025 and 2026. Although there has been a cultural competition since the 1990s the Palladian Cup as it is now known has existed since 2001, under the organisation of Sancta Sophia. Since 2011 the competition has been organised under the auspices of the University of Sydney Union. One of the most notable accomplishments by an Androvian in the cup, was the three successive Solo Instrumental victories on piano by Will Cesta from 2013 to 2015.

=== Intramural ===
St Andrew's also competes annually in the Intramural Champions Cup, which is opened to sixteen student accommodation providers associated with the University of Sydney. The cup was designed to "engage in friendly competition while fostering a sense of community". There are three cups associated with the competition; the Intramural Champions Cup: Awarded to the residence that earns the most points across all events, excluding sports competitions, the Thomas Whalan Cup: Awarded to the residence with the most points in Intramural sports (male category) and the Liane Tooth Cup: Awarded to the residence with the most points in Intramural sports (female category). The University Cup has eleven events throughout the year; the intramural mixer, welcome shield, cook-off, oztag (tag rugby), trivia, badminton, ultimate frisbee, futsal, power pitch, basketball and intramural idol.

St Andrew's College remains the only college to have won the Palladian, Rosebowl, Rawson, and University Cup (tallied from Rawson and Rosebowl results) all in one academic year. They held all four cups in 2020 and 2022. "Four cups one college" is a common Androvian slogan.

== Notable former residents ==
=== Politics ===
Current

- Tim Ayres, Minister for Industry and Innovation and Minister for Science
- Angus Taylor, Leader of the Opposition and leader of the Liberal Party of Australia; Member for Hume
- Alister Henskens, state MP for Wahroonga

Former

- H. V. Bert (Doc) Evatt, Australian Opposition Leader, youngest ever High Court Judge and President of the United Nations
- Sir George Fuller, Premier of NSW
- John Mason, former Leader of the Opposition (New South Wales)
- Rob Oakeshott, Independent Federal Member of Parliament for Lyne
- Philip Lucock, Deputy Speaker of the House of Representatives and Member for Lyne
- Frederick Osborne, Australian Minister for Customs and Excise, Minister for Air and Minister for Repatriation and Member for Evans
- Garry West, NSW Minister for Police and Member for Orange
- Andrew Constance, NSW Minister for Transport and Infrastructure

=== Law ===
- H. V. Bert (Doc) Evatt, High Court Judge
- Joseph Campbell, judge of the New South Wales Court of Appeal
- Alan Loxton AM, Former Senior Partner Allen, Allen and Hemsley
- Reginald Kerr Manning, Barrister who established and edited The Bankruptcy and Company Law Cases of New South Wales
- Charles Waterstreet, Barrister, author and producer
- Ian Jackman, Federal Court Judge

=== The Sciences ===
- Gordon Childe, renowned prehistorian, philologist and archaeologist
- Raymond Dart, anthropologist
- John Bradfield, engineer and designer of the Sydney Harbour Bridge who received the first doctorate of science in engineering from the university

=== Medicine ===
- Cecil Cook, Medical administrator

=== The Arts ===
- Alex Cubis, actor and lawyer
- A.D. Hope, Poet
- Mungo Wentworth MacCallum, Political journalist
- Bob Brissenden, Poet and Novelist
- Frank Walker, Journalist and writer
- Chris Brown, Television presenter
- Sophie Payten, Singer known professionally as Gordi
- Toni Watson, Australian singer professionally known as Tones and I (musician)

=== Theology ===
- Revd. Dr John Dunmore Lang, foundation Councillor 1870–1878. Lang was a prominent Australian Presbyterian minister, politician, activist, republican, and libelist.
- Revd. Dr Andrew Harper, former Principal
- Revd. Dr Samuel Angus, professor of New Testament and Church History, charged with heresy
- Peter Cameron, former Principal and convicted heretic
- John McIntyre CVO, Hunter Baillie Professor 1946–1856, Principal 1950–1956, Honorary Fellow 1990–2005, sometime Professor of Divinity and Principal of New College in the University of Edinburgh, Moderator of the General Assembly of the Church of Scotland, and Dean of the Order of the Thistle

=== Academia ===
- Professor George Arnold Wood, Foundation Challis Professor of History at the University of Sydney 1891–1928
- Cecil Purser, Vice Chancellor of the University of Sydney 1917–1918 and 1923, Deputy Chancellor of the University of Sydney 1924–1925
- Sir David Gilbert Ferguson, Vice Chancellor of the University of Sydney 1919–1921
- Sir Percival Halse Rogers KBE, Chancellor of the University of Sydney, 1936–1941
- Robert C. Robertson-Cuninghame, Chancellor of the University of New England, 1981–1993
- Professor Clifford Blake, Vice Chancellor of Charles Sturt University, 1990–2001 and Vice Chancellor of the University of Adelaide, 2001–2002
- Associate Professor R. Ian Jack, Dean of the Faculty of Arts of the University of Sydney, Senior Fellow of St Andrew's College, co-founder of Historical Archaeology in Australia

=== Military ===
- Lt General Sir Iven Mackay, KBE, CMG, DSO & Two Bars, VD
- Group Captain Peter Jeffrey, DSO, DFC, Group Commander Royal Australian Air Force
- Brigadier Sir Kenneth Fraser, CBE

=== Sport ===
==== Rugby Union ====
Wallaby Captains

- Phil Waugh, who is currently the chief executive officer of Rugby Australia
- Nick Farr-Jones
- Dick Tooth
- John Solomon
- Johnnie Wallace, also played 9 rugby tests for Scotland and coached the Wallabies in 1937 and 1953
- Tom Lawton Snr
- Alex Ross
- Bill Hardcastle
- Nick Champion de Crespigny

Other Wallabies

- Scott Gourley, dual international rugby union and rugby league
- Marty Roebuck
- Jackie Beith
- Hugh Taylor
- Arthur Finlay
- Duncan Fowles
- Johnny Taylor, dual international cricket and rugby union
- Saxon White
- Myer Rosenblum
- David Brockhoff
- Nathan Charles
- David Fitter
- Otto Nothling, dual international Cricket and Rugby Union
- Max Jorgensen

==== Others ====
- Forbes Carlile, Olympic competitor 1952 Summer Olympics and Swimming coach of various Olympic swimmers including Shane Gould
- Johnny Taylor, former Australia Test cricketer and Wallaby
- Otto Nothling, Former Australian Test Cricketer and Wallaby
- Nigel Barker, Olympic athlete 1906 Athens Olympics holder of Australia's first athletics world record, in the 400 yards, and an Olympic Games bronze medalist in the 400 yards and 100 yards events.
- John Hudson, Olympic rower 1960 Rome Olympics
- Les McKeand, Olympic athlete 1948 London Olympics
- Glenn Kable, Olympic shooter for Fiji, 2004 Athens Olympics, 2008 Beijing Olympics, 2012 London Olympics and 2016 Rio Olympics
- Hannah Buckling, Olympic water polo player 2016 Rio Olympics
- Jaime Ryan, Olympic sailor 2016 Rio Olympics
- James Matheson, Olympic skier 2018 Winter Olympics
- Rohan Browning, Olympic sprinter 2020 Tokyo Olympics
- Phoebe Litchfield, Australian cricketer
- Clare Hunt, Australian Footballer and player for The Maltidas
- Clare Wheeler, Australian Footballer and player for The Maltidas

=== Rhodes Scholars ===
- 1904 Wilfred Barton
- 1905 Percival Halse Rogers
- 1906 Mungo Lorenz MacCallum
- 1908 Stanley Castlehow (for Queensland)
- 1910 John R. Hooten
- 1911 Harold K. Denham (for Queensland)
- 1921 Tom Lawton, Snr (for Queensland)
- 1922 Arthur C. Wallace
- 1928 Richard Ashburner
- 1929 Ian M. Edwards
- 1930 Norman K. Lamport
- 1934 Hugh C. Barry
- 1947 David R. Stewart
- 1949 Robert C. Robertson-Cuninghame
- 1984 Ian M. Jackman
- 1991 Angus Taylor
- 2004 Alexander W. Cameron
- 2004 Stephanie M. Topp
- 2024 Dr Ragavi Jeyakumar
