= Intramural sports =

Recreational sports organized within a particular institution

Intramural sports, also known as interhall sports, hall sports, or (in collegiate universities, particularly outside of North America) inter-collegiate sport or college sport, are recreational sports organized within a particular institution, usually an educational institution, for the purpose of fun and exercise. The term is chiefly North American, although the concept originates from the United Kingdom and the term has been adopted there (normally as intramural sport in the singular). It is contrasted with extramural, varsity or intercollegiate (US) sports, which are played between teams from different educational institutions. The word intermural, which means "between institutions", is a common error for "intramural".

== Etymology ==
The word intramural, derived from the Latin words intra muros meaning "within walls", dates from the 1840s in the general sense of "being or occurring within the limits usually of a community, organization, or institution", used in terms such as intramural burials, and eventually came to refer to sports matches and contests that took place among teams from "within the walls" of an institution or area. The use of intramural in the sense of sports has been attributed to A. S. Whitney, a Latin professor at the University of Michigan.

== History ==
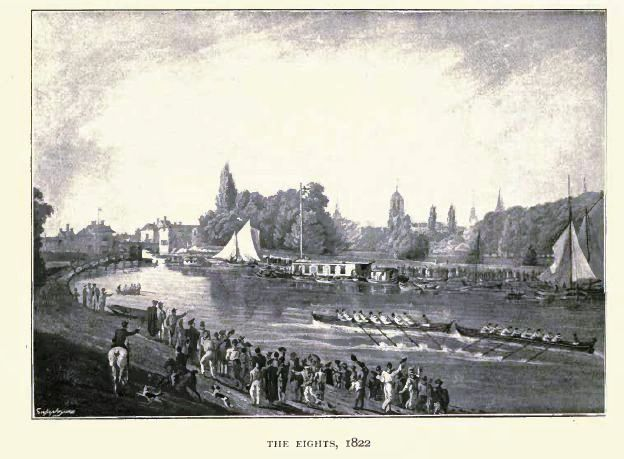
Two college eights, thought to be Brasenose and Jesus, pictured racing at the University of Oxford in 1822

The earliest reference to medieval football being played by students at Oxford University in England dates back to the 14th century. Sport became established within British universities in the 19th century, particularly cricket, rowing, football and athletics. The oldest competitive intramural sport is inter-collegiate rowing at Oxford University, where the first known competition was in 1815 with Brasenose College winning and Jesus College being possibly their only competitor. Inter-collegiate rowing spread to Cambridge University in 1827 and to Durham University in 1850. During the Victorian era, a group of students from Cambridge University created a set of 11 rules for football in 1848, building on their experiences of early English public school football games. A document from 1856 names the Cambridge University Association Football Club and its rules, although the club was formed a decade earlier. In 1863, the Football Association of England adopted most of these rules and added three more Laws of the Game, thus creating association football. Internal athletics (track and field) competitions were introduced at public schools and Durham University in the 1840s. This spread to Oxford, where Exeter College held an organised sports competition in 1850, and Cambridge, where St John's College and Emmanuel College held "athletic games" in 1855, followed by Trinity College in 1856 and a university-wide competition in 1857. The colleges of Oxford, Cambridge and Durham provided a natural focus for sporting activity, and by the end of the 19th century inter-collegiate sports competitions (including many of the cuppers at Oxford and Cambridge) were well established at all three universities. In the early 20th century, the inclusion of Durham's Armstrong College in Newcastle in the inter-collegiate competitions led to a rule that only matriculated students could compete, excluding the large non-matriculated membership of the college and preserving the middle-class, amateur nature of the events.

Outside of the collegiate universities, there is a record of a football match (of some form) between the English and Scottish students at the University of Edinburgh in 1851. The English university colleges, associated with the University of London and the Victoria University, faced challenges in sport from a lack of facilities – often having to rent playing fields – and due to being non-residential institutions whose sporting students were often attached to local clubs rather than the university. Despite this, sports clubs formed at many of these during the 1880s and 1890s and participated in local fixtures, but no mention is made of intramural matches.

Athletic competition among students at Harvard University in the United States began in 1780 when a group of sophomore students challenged freshmen students to a wrestling match. In 1827, the first reference to an annual “football” contest between freshmen and sophomore students was published. Intramural sport began at other US universities later in the 19th century, such as the baseball match between freshmen and sophomores at Princeton in 1857. This division by graduating class was followed at other US universities. By the 1880s, Yale had a college rowing championship, contested by class crews, and a class baseball championship. At Harvard, at around the same time, it was complained that "Each class has its own crew ... But the class nine and the class elevens exist only in name." Elmer Mitchell would later note that intramural sports grew in the 1860s, with clubs established "in somewhat the same manner that sport is carried on in English universities", but declined as the sports clubs concentrated on inter-varsity competition.

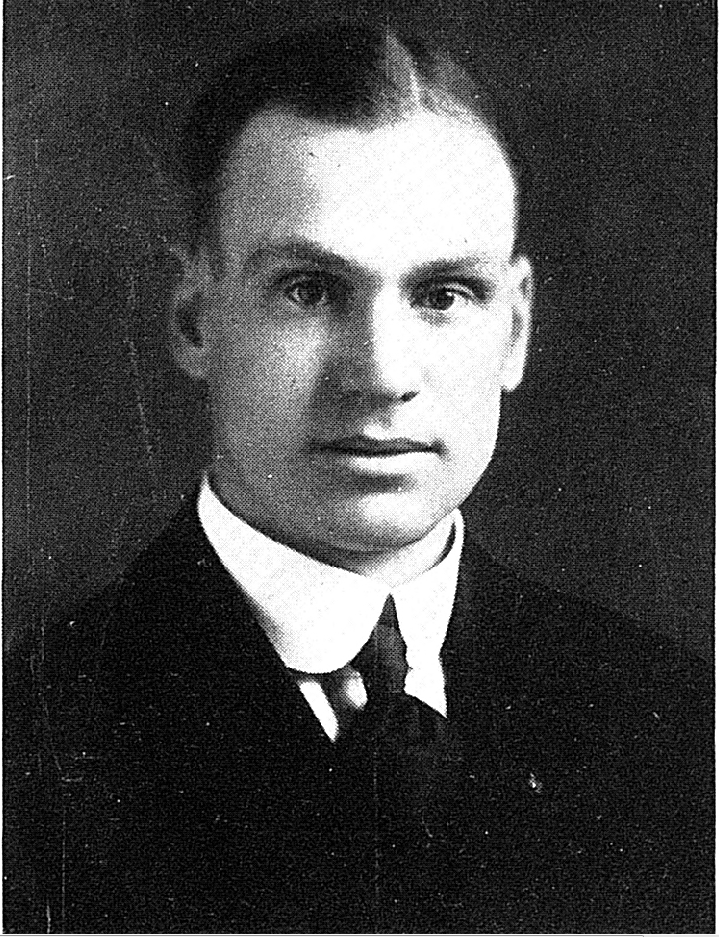
Elmer D. Mitchell, University of Michigan Director of Intramural Athletics, 1919

In Australia, inter-faculty matches between arts and medicine were established at the University of Sydney by the mid 1890s. In 1906, Harry Rawson, the Governor of New South Wales, presented the university with the Rawson Cup for men's intercollegiate sports, which is competed for annually between the university's colleges.

A second stage in the development of intramural sport in the US was the setting up of inter-class competitions, originally between first year and second year students but then expanding to take in all four undergraduate years. Slightly later, inter-fraternity sports were organized at some universities. The pressure put on sports facilities by the growing demand led to the institutions formalizing the organization of intramural sports. The first intramural sports departments in the United States were thus established at Ohio State University and the University of Michigan in 1913. Mitchell, a graduate student, at the time, was named the first Director of Intramural Sports at the University of Michigan in 1919. The first sports facility in the country dedicated to recreational sports opened at the University of Michigan in 1928. Mitchell went on to write Intramural Athletics (1925) and Intramural Sports (1939), and became known as "the father of intramural sports". One of Mitchell's students in 1946 was William Wasson, who founded the National Intramural Association (later the National Intramural and Recreational Sports Association; NIRSA) at a meeting of intramural directors from 11 Historically Black Colleges and Universities in 1950.

In the 1930s, the establishment of houses at Harvard and colleges at Yale meant the introduction of inter-college and inter-house competitions to the US, replacing the previous intramural organization at Harvard and inter-class competitions at Yale.

== By country ==
=== Australia ===
Colleges at the University of Adelaide compete across multiple sports for the High Table Cup, also known as the Douglas-Irving Cup. Intercollegiate sports are also played between the colleges of the University of Sydney for the Rosebowl (women) and the Rawson Cup (men). Other universities with intercollegiate sports programs include the University of Melbourne, the University of New England, the University of New South Wales and the University of Western Australia.

=== Canada ===
The Canadian Intramural Recreation Association was established in 1977 to share information and facilitate professional development in secondary and tertiary institutions in Canada, but became inactive in the 1990s. The Western Canadian Campus Recreation Association was established in 2009 and became the Canadian Campus Recreation Association in 2012. In 2013, they opened discussions with the US NIRSA about establishing a Canadian chapter within NIRSA, and in 2017 NIRSA established a Canada region.

The Ontario Intramural Recreation Association was established in 1969. After the formation of CIRA, this became CIRA Ontario in 1989. It remains active as a charity promoting intramural and recreational sports in Ontario.

At many Canadian universities, intramural sports competitions are for teams formed by students. There are inter-college sports at York University, where the colleges compete for the "York Torch", although students can also form their own teams in open intramural competitions. At the University of Toronto, the upper divisions of the intramural leagues are restricted to teams representing colleges, faculties or residences, while the lower divisions are open to student-formed teams.

=== United Kingdom ===
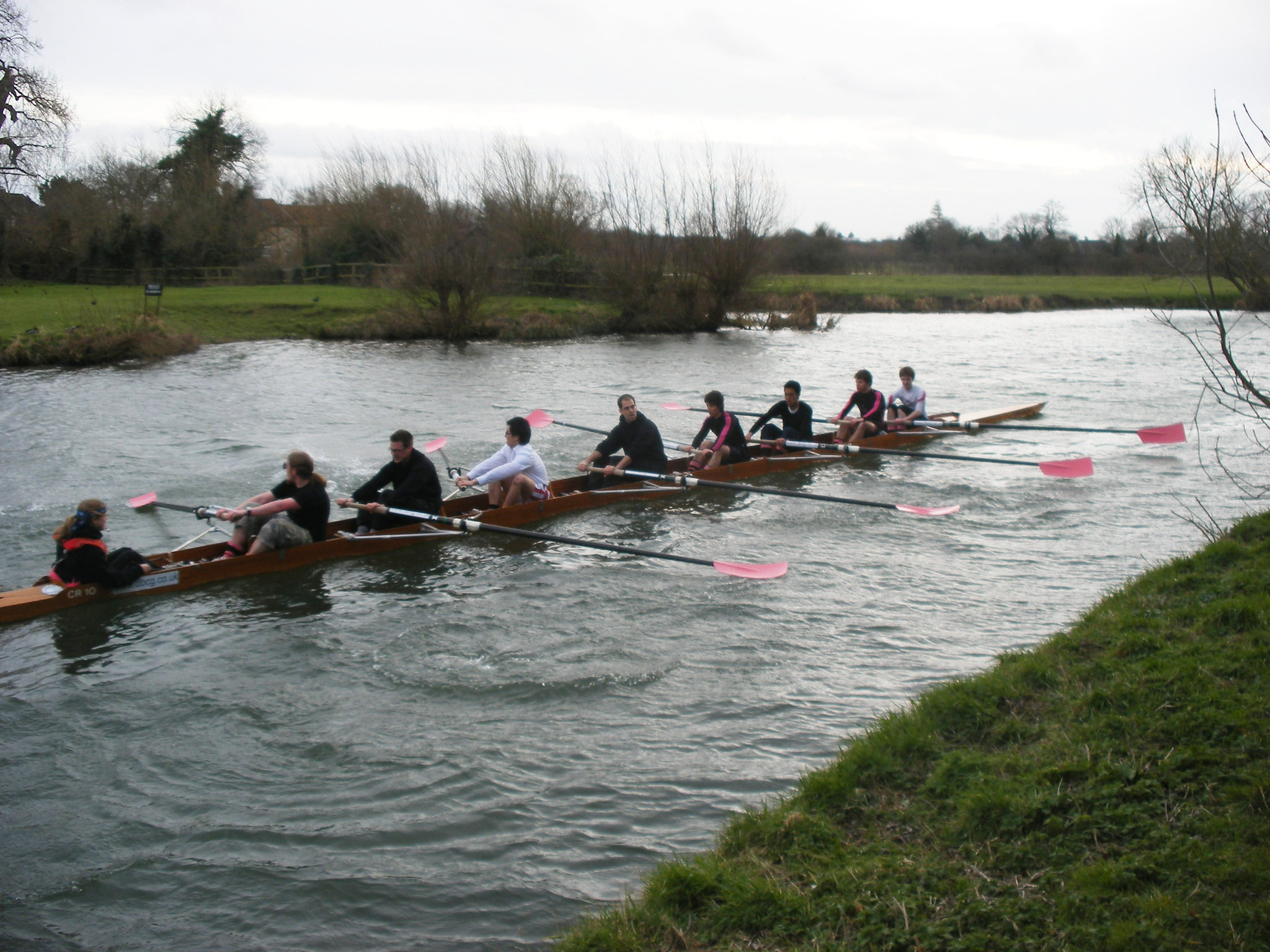
Churchill College Boat Club competing in an intercollegiate bumps race at the University of Cambridge

Around three quarters of universities in the United Kingdom offer recreational sports within the university. At the collegiate universities of Cambridge, Durham, Oxford, Lancaster and York, recreational sport takes place between colleges and is known as college sport, inter-college sport, or inter-collegiate sport. More generally, recreational sport within a university in the United Kingdom is often called intramural sport, and teams may represent halls of residence, academic departments, university sports clubs from other sports, other societies or simply groups of friends. Recreational sport exists alongside varsity matches with rival universities and inter-university competitions organized by British Universities and Colleges Sport (BUCS). In terms of participation, Durham University's college sports is the largest intramural program in the UK and one of the largest in the world, with over 75% of students (i.e., over 16,000 students based on the 2023–24 student population of 21,750) taking part in sports and more than 550 college teams across 18 sports. Collingwood College Association Football Club is said to be the largest amateur football club in the UK. The largest program in Scotland is at the University of Edinburgh.

Matches between representative intramural teams at different universities are sometimes arranged, such as the intramural varsities between Loughborough intramural sports teams and Durham college teams and between Loughborough intramural sports teams and Nottingham intramural sports teams, and the college varsity between college teams from Durham and York. College teams also participate in the Roses Tournament between York and Lancaster In the past, a men's and women's intercollegiate boat race was part of the Henley Boat Races between Oxford and Cambridge. College boat clubs from Oxford, Cambridge and Durham often compete in external events such as the Head of the River Race.

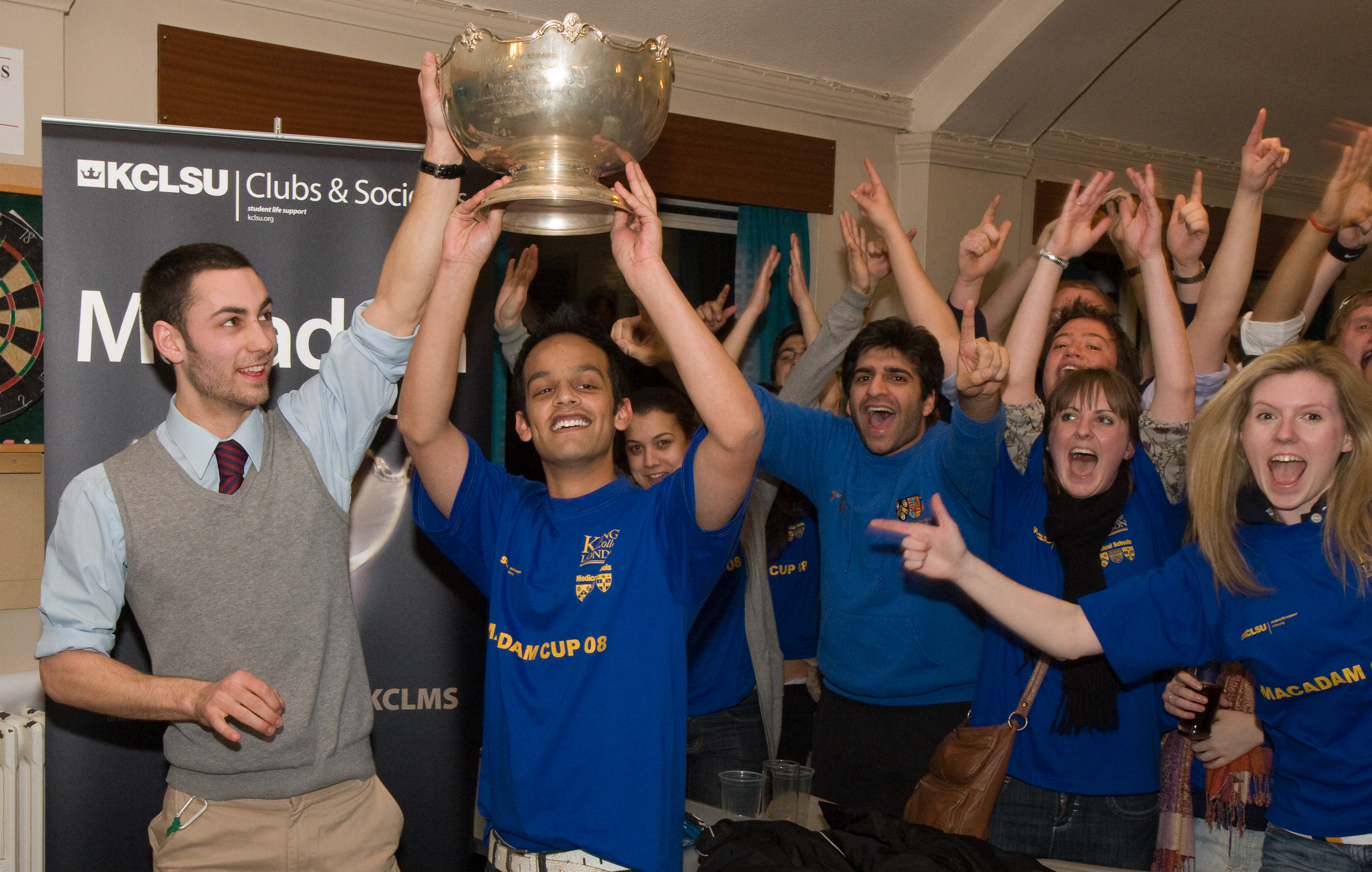
The Macadam Cup being awarded in 2008

One particular form of intramural competition is between medical schools and the rest of the university. This is found at places like Imperial College London, where Imperial Medics play the rest of Imperial College in the Imperial Varsity, and King's College London, where Guy’s, King’s College and St Thomas medical school play the rest of King's for the Macadam Cup.

Research by British Universities and Colleges Sport (BUCS) in association with the Complete University Guide has found that institutions with a higher BUCS rank (for inter-university sport) are more likely to provide intramural sport. In 2022–23, all of the top-20 ranked institutions had intramural programs, falling to 79% for institutions ranked 21 to 60, 71% for institutions ranked 61 to 100, and only 39% for institutions outside of the top 100. Overall, 73% of institutions had intramural sports, with the most commonly offered sport for men being association football (in 72% of institutions) and for women being netball (also in 72% of institutions). The average number of intramural teams per institution was 87 in 2022–23, up from 79 the year before but still down on the pre-pandemic average of 113 teams in 2018–19 and 2019–20. Membership of sports clubs and societies was around 12% of the student population in 2022–23, down from around 14% in 2019–20; in top-20 institutions it was just over 20%, down from around 23% pre-pandemic. An earlier report also found that the average number of intramural sports offered had dropped from 6.7 before the pandemic to 5.9 in 2021–22.

While most intramural sport is played at university facilities, the colleges of collegiate universities sometimes have their own facilities, often funded by college alumni. In Oxford, the Christ Church Ground hosted 37 first-class cricket matches played by the university between 1878 and 1961 and the New College Ground also hosted three first-class matches for the university, in 1906, 1907 and 1927. Some Cambridge colleges also have extensive supporting facilities. In Durham, Collingwood College's new multi-purpose pitch was opened by then-Newcastle United manager Rafa Benítez in 2017.

=== United States ===
NIRSA provides a national network of nearly 4,500 highly trained professionals, students and associate members in field of recreational sports.

As in the UK, intramural sports at universities where all students belong to a residential college may be organized along college lines, e.g., at Harvard and Yale. At others, such as Rice University, there is a distinction between college sports and intramural sports more generally. A third option, such as at the University of California, San Diego, is that intramural sports are separate from the residential college organization. Some residential universities, such as Notre Dame, run specific interhall competitions alongside open intramural competitions. At some universities, such as Missouri State University and Georgia Southern University, there are inter-fraternity or fraternity and sorority life sports competitions between the fraternities and sororities at the university.

A house–college rowing race was held between Harvard houses and Yale colleges from 1932 to at least 1958. The champions of the Yale colleges intramural competition and the Harvard houses intramural competition have competed annually for the Harkness Cup since 1935, The jubilee competition in 1985 was reported on in The New York Times.

== See also ==
- Durham College Rowing
- Eights Week – Intercollegiate regatta at the University of Oxford
- Lent Bumps and May Bumps – intercollegiate rowing competitions at the University of Cambridge
- Physical education
- Team sport
- University and college sport
