= Peter Cameron (minister) =

Scottish clergyman (born 1945)

Peter Cameron (born 1945) is a former Scottish Presbyterian minister, theologian, lawyer, who was notable for being convicted of heresy.

== Early life ==
Cameron was born in 1945 in Scotland, read law at Edinburgh University, and studied theology at Edinburgh and Cambridge before being ordained as a minister in the Church of Scotland.

== Career ==
Cameron and his family moved to Sydney, New South Wales, Australia at the beginning of 1991, when he was appointed Principal of St Andrew's College at the University of Sydney, and thus became a minister in the Presbyterian Church of Australia.

== Conviction for heresy ==
Cameron was charged with heresy in 1993 for challenging Christian beliefs, as Samuel Angus, a previous professor at St Andrew's College, had been in the 1930s. Whereas Angus was finally acquitted, Cameron was convicted by the Presbyterian Church of Australia of heresy for disagreeing with the first chapter of the Westminster Confession of Faith, which as a minister of the Presbyterian Church of Australia, he was required "firmly and constantly to adhere thereto and to the utmost of [his] power to maintain and defend", by questioning the writings of Paul in the New Testament.

The charge related to a sermon that he preached on 2 March 1992 called "The Place of Women in the Church" to 300 members of a Dorcas Society Rally (a Presbyterian women's organisation) in the conservative Ashfield Presbyterian Church. In the sermon Cameron supported the ordination of women to the ministry, criticised the church's hard line on homosexuality, and attacked fundamentalist Christianity in general. According to Bruce Christian, a member of the Sydney Presbytery in the Presbyterian Church, Cameron was prosecuted for his attitude to Scripture in the lecture, stating: "The point he actually made at the public rally was that there was little value in arguing the hermeneutics of 1 Timothy 2:11-15 on the ordination of women, the simple fact is that Paul got it wrong."

In Australia, most congregations of the Presbyterian Church had left that body in 1977 to join the Uniting Church in Australia. The thirty-six per cent of congregations that stayed tended to be more conservative than the majority that left. This meant that the Presbyterian Church in Australia was a far more conservative body than its 'parent' the Church of Scotland. Thus, Cameron's opinions were far more remarkable in the context of the Australian church than they would have been in the Scottish context. A church spokesman, Paul Cooper noted that:

"though the views that Dr Cameron is spouting would be acceptable in Scotland, they are not acceptable in Australia. We are a different church...an independent Church. Colonialism is dead. Dr Cameron wants the Presbyterian Church to be like the Church of Scotland...but we make our own decisions and our decision is that we don’t want to be that sort of church. We stand under the authority of the Bible."

The ordination of women was a particularly 'live' issue at the time. Seven months after Dr Cameron's arrival, the General Assembly of Australia had decided to reverse a seventeen-year-old policy of ordaining women. Cameron's thoughts towards women in the Church has been also attributed to him having a daughter, with him stating in his controversial sermon:

"it was only recently that the full significance came home to me when I suddenly realised that the effect of the decision to ban the ordination of women is that my daughter cannot become a minister of the Presbyterian Church of Australia. I don't mean that she was intending to. I mean that up to that point it was only the absurdity of the position that had struck me...after that I began to get angry. My daughter...goes to the PLC Croydon. It occurs to me that these initials now stand for Presbyterian Ladies Can't."

Cameron's conviction might have led to deposition (exclusion from the ministry) or excommunication (expulsion from the church). However he withdrew his last appeal and resigned from the ministry on 31 July 1994.

Cameron returned to Scotland in January 1996, and left the Church of Scotland to be ordained in the Scottish Episcopal Church (a historic Church that is in communion with the Church of England within the Anglican Communion).

In 2008 he obtained a Ph.D. in Classics from the University of St Andrews for a thesis entitled 'Approaching Death in the Classical World'.

== Published works ==
Cameron is the author of several books, the most well-known of which, Heretic, ISBN 0-86824-544-5, gives his account of the heresy trial.

- Peter Cameron (1997). Finishing school for blokes : college life exposed. St. Leonards, NSW, Australia : Allen & Unwin. ISBN 1-86448-134-X.
- Peter Cameron (1994). Heretic. Sydney : Doubleday. ISBN 0-86824-544-5.
- Peter Cameron (1993). Necessary heresies : alternatives to fundamentalism. Kensington, N.S.W. : New South Wales University Press. ISBN 0-86840-293-1.

== See also ==
- List of Australian Presbyterians
