= Otto Nothling =

Australian sportsman (1900–1965)

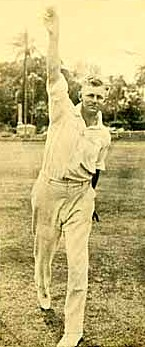
- Born: Otto Ernest Nothling; 1 August 1900 Teutoberg, Queensland, Australia
- Died: 26 September 1965 (aged 65) Chelmer, Queensland
- University: University of Sydney

Rugby union career
- Position: fullback
International career
Years	Team	Apps	(Points)
1921–24	Wallabies	19	(36)
- Cricket career

Cricket information
- Batting: Right-handed
- Bowling: Right-arm fast-medium

International information
- National side: Australia
- Only Test (cap 127): 14 December 1928 v England

Domestic team information
- Years: Team
- 1922-23 to 1924-25: New South Wales
- 1927-28 to 1929-30: Queensland

Career statistics
Competition	Tests	First-class
Matches	1	21
Runs scored	52	882
Batting average	26.00	24.50
100s/50s	0/0	1/6
Top score	44	121
Balls bowled	276	3810
Wickets	0	36
Bowling average	–	41.05
5 wickets in innings	–	2
10 wickets in match	–	0
Best bowling	–	5/39
Catches/stumpings	0/–	15/–
- Source: cricinfo, 10 October 2019

Otto Ernest Nothling (1 August 1900 – 26 September 1965) was a rugby union player who represented Australia, as well as an Australian cricketer who played in one Test in 1928. He is one of only two Australian rugby and cricket dual internationals, the other being Johnny Taylor. He became a dermatologist.

== Early life and education ==
Nothling was born of German immigrant parents on 1 August 1900 in Teutoberg, Queensland, an area settled by German immigrants. He won a scholarship to Brisbane Grammar School, and went on to the University of Sydney, where he studied Medicine whilst residing at St Andrew's College. At the time there was no medical school in Queensland.

He was a champion athlete at school and university, excelling at running distances between 100 and 440 yards, as well as shot put and javelin. He set a New South Wales record at his first javelin event.

== Rugby union career ==
Nothling, a fullback, claimed a total of 19 international rugby caps for Australia, playing against New Zealand, Maoris and South Africa. He retired from rugby when he graduated from university. At the time of his death he was vice-president of the Queensland Rugby Union.

== Cricket career ==
Nothling was a right-arm fast-medium bowler and hard-hitting middle-order batsman. He played for New South Wales while studying in Sydney, then for Queensland from the 1927–28 season. He took five wickets – all of leading batsmen – when Queensland played the touring MCC in November 1928. A few weeks later he was selected for the Second Test. He opened the bowling but took no wickets, and made 44 in the second innings, adding 101 for the fifth wicket with Jack Ryder.

His best first-class score was 121, scored in 145 minutes, for Queensland against New South Wales shortly after his Test appearance in 1928–29. His best bowling figures were 5 for 39 against New South Wales in 1927–28 in the second innings, when Queensland almost won the drawn match after being made to follow on. In a club match for Maryborough against Gayndah in December 1929 he took 10 for 16 in the first innings.

== Later life ==
After graduating as a doctor, Nothling briefly practised medicine in Dubbo in western New South Wales before returning to Queensland. He moved to Maryborough, Queensland, in 1929, and retired from major sport, although he continued to play cricket locally. He married Mildred Horsburgh in Maryborough in June 1932.

Nothling served in World War II as a medical officer, with the rank of major, in Egypt and Greece from 1940 until 1943, when he was invalided out. He later became a dermatologist, practising in Brisbane. At the time of his death he was President of the Queensland Cricket Association.

He died of hypertensive heart disease on 26 September 1965 at Chelmer, Brisbane, aged 65. He was survived by his wife and their son and daughter.
