= Kevin Fagan =

Kevin Fagan is the name of:

- Kevin Fagan (cartoonist) (born 1956), American cartoonist, creator of the syndicated comic strip Drabble
- Kevin Fagan (doctor) (1909–1992), Australian doctor and World War II hero
- Kevin Fagan (American football) (born 1963), former defensive end for the San Francisco 49ers
