= Rawson Cup =

University of Sydney men's athletic award

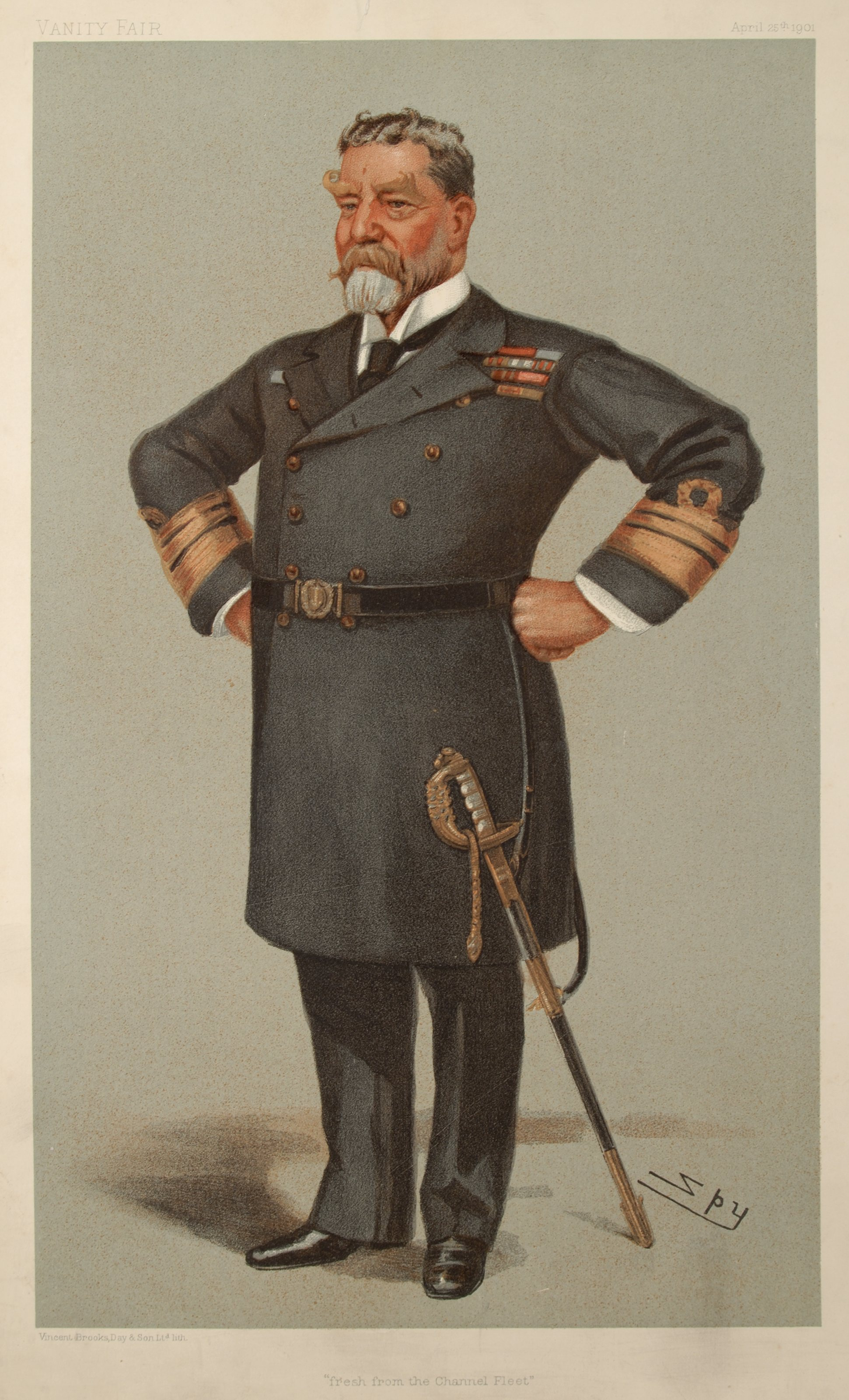
Admiral Sir Harry Rawson caricatured by Spy for Vanity Fair, 1901

The Admiral Sir Harry Rawson Cup, commonly known as "The Rawson Cup", was presented to the Sydney University Sports Union in 1906 by Admiral Sir Harry Rawson, GCB, KCMG, Governor of New South Wales (1902–1909). The Rawson Cup is the male intercollegiate sporting competition at the University of Sydney. The cup is fought for by men representing each of the four colleges with male undergraduate students; St Andrew's College, St John's College, Wesley College and St Paul's College. In addition, postgraduate men of Sancta Sophia College compete in rowing, swimming, and athletics.

It is contested over the academic year and consists of 8 sports:

- ‍Rowing
- ‍Swimming
- ‍Athletics
- ‍Rugby
- ‍Basketball
- ‍Tennis
- ‍Cricket
- ‍Soccer

Previously shooting was a Rawson Cup sport but this was replaced by basketball in 1975. Soccer was introduced as a Rawson Cup sport in 1993. At the conclusion of each sport points are awarded: seven [7] for first place, five [5] for second place, three [3] for third place and one [1] for fourth place. At the conclusion of the last sport the leader in the points score wins the Rawson Cup.

St Andrew's College have won the Cup the most and possess the longest continuous winning streak of eight years (1991 to 1998).

Prior to the donation of the Rawson Cup, there was a sport played between the men's colleges at the University of Sydney on an informal basis from about 1892.

The system used to determine the winner of the cup has a rather tangled history. Intercollegiate delegates have argued for many years over the interpretation of the word "challenge". Prior to 1922, the holder was determined on a first-place only basis, though half a point was awarded to each of the two colleges involved in a tied win in a sport. From 1922 second places were taken into consideration in the event in the event of two colleges obtaining an equal number of first places. In 1948, after consulting the University Of Sydney Sports Union, Intercol introduced the 5:3:1:0 scoring system, where points are shared in case of a draw. In 2025, the scoring moved to a 7:5:3:1 system.

The challenge principle was held to be still preserved in that the college holding the cup had to be defeated on points to relinquish it. On each of the five occasions where St Andrew's and St Paul's were equal on points (1960, 1978, 1996, 2020 and 2024), St Andrew's retained the cup although both names were inscribed on it. The award of the cup is considered valid even if all the sports are not contested, such as in 1946 when rowing and shooting were not contested.

During the two world wars, there were self-imposed restrictions on college sports and so the award of the Rawson Cup during those years was discontinued, although some informal sport did take place.

== Results ==
=== Overall ===
Total Victories
College	Number of Wins
St Andrew's College	64
St Paul's College	41
Wesley College	7
St John's College	3

Winners by Year
Year	College
1907	St Paul's College
1908	St Andrew's College
1909	St Andrew's College
1910	St Andrew's College
1911	St Andrew's College
1912	St Andrew's College
1913	St Andrew's College
1914	St Andrew's College
1915	discontinued
1916	discontinued
1917	discontinued
1918	discontinued
1919	St Andrew's College
1920	St Paul's College
1921	St Andrew's College
1922	St Andrew's College
1923	St Paul's College
1924	St Andrew's College
1925	St Andrew's College
1926	St Andrew's College
1927	St Andrew's College
1928	St Andrew's College
1929	St Andrew's College
1930	St Paul's College
1931	St Paul's College
1932	St Andrew's College
1933	St Andrew's College
1934	St Andrew's College
1935	St Andrew's College
1936	St Andrew's College
1937	St Paul's College
1938	St Paul's College
1939	St Paul's College
1940	discontinued
1941	discontinued
1942	discontinued
1943	discontinued
1944	discontinued
1945	discontinued
1946	St Andrew's College
1947	St Paul's College
1948	St Paul's College
1949	St Andrew's College
1950	Wesley College
1951	St Andrew's College
1952	St Paul's College
1953	St Paul's College
1954	St Andrew's College
1955	St Paul's College
1956	St Paul's College
1957	St Paul's College
1958	St Andrew's College
1959	St Andrew's College
1960	St Andrew's College, St Paul's College
1961	St Andrew's College
1962	Wesley College
1963	St Paul's College
1964	St Paul's College
1965	St Andrew's College
1966	St Andrew's College
1967	St Paul's College
1968	St Andrew's College
1969	St Andrew's College
1970	St Andrew's College
1971	St Andrew's College
1972	St Paul's College
1973	St Paul's College
1974	St John's College
1975	St Paul's College
1976	St Paul's College
1977	St Andrew's College
1978	St Andrew's College, St Paul's College
1979	St Andrew's College
1980	St Andrew's College
1981	St Paul's College
1982	St Paul's College
1983	St Andrew's College
1984	St Andrew's College
1985	St Paul's College
1986	St Paul's College
1987	St Andrew's College
1988	St Paul's College
1989	St Paul's College
1990	St Paul's College
1991	St Andrew's College
1992	St Andrew's College
1993	St Andrew's College
1994	St Andrew's College
1995	St Andrew's College
1996	St Andrew's College, St Paul's College
1997	St Andrew's College
1998	St Andrew's College
1999	Wesley College
2000	Wesley College
2001	Wesley College
2002	Wesley College
2003	St Paul's College
2004	Wesley College
2005	St Paul's College
2006	St Paul's College
2007	St Paul's College
2008	St Paul's College
2009	St Paul's College
2010	St Andrew's College
2011	St Andrew's College
2012	St Andrew's College
2013	St Andrew's College
2014	St Andrew's College
2015	St Andrew's College
2016	St Andrew's College
2017	St Paul's College
2018	St Andrew's College
2019	St Andrew's College
2020	St Andrew's College, St Paul's College
2021	St Andrew's College
2022	St Andrew's College
2023	St Andrew's College
2024	St Andrew's College, St Paul's College
2025	St John's College
2026	St John's College

=== Cricket ===
Year	College
2011	St Andrew's College
2012	St Andrew's College
2013	St Andrew's College, St John's College
2014	St Andrew's College
2015	Wesley College
2016	St Paul's College
2017	St Andrew's College
2018	St Andrew's College
2019	St Andrew's College
2020	St Andrew's College
2021	St Paul's College
2022	St Paul's College, St Andrew's College
2023	St Andrew's College
2024	St Andrew's College
2025	St Paul's College, Wesley College, St John's College
2026	St Paul's College, St John's College

=== Swimming ===
Year	College
2011	St Andrew's College
2012	St Andrew's College
2013	St Andrew's College
2014	St Andrew's College
2015	St Andrew's College
2016	St Andrew's College
2017	St Andrew's College
2018	St John's College
2019	St Andrew's College
2020	St Andrew's College
2021	St Andrew's College
2022	St Andrew's College
2023	St Andrew's College
2024	St Andrew's College
2025	St John's College
2026	St John's College

=== Rowing ===
Year	College
2011	St Andrew's College
2012	St Andrew's College
2013	St Andrew's College
2014	St Andrew's College
2015	St Andrew's College
2016	St Andrew's College
2017	St Andrew's College
2018	St Andrew's College
2019	St Andrew's College
2020	St Paul's College
2021	St Paul's College
2022	St Paul's College
2023	St Paul's College
2024	St Paul's College
2025	St John's College
2026	St John's College

=== Rugby ===
Year	College
2011	St Andrew's College, St John's College
2012	St Andrew's College
2013	St Andrew's College
2014	St Andrew's College
2015	St Andrew's College
2016	St Andrew's College
2017	St Paul's College
2018	St Paul's College
2019	St Andrew's College
2020	St Andrew's College
2021	St Andrew's College
2022	St Andrew's College
2023	St Andrew's College
2024	St John's College
2025	St John's College
2026	St John's College

=== Soccer ===
Year	College
2011	St John's College
2012	St Andrew's College
2013	St Andrew's College
2014	Wesley College
2015	St Andrew's College
2016	Wesley College
2017	St Paul's College
2018	St Andrew's College
2019	St Paul's College
2020	St Paul's College
2021	St Paul's College, St Andrew's College
2022	St Paul's College, St Andrew's College
2023	St Paul's College
2024	St Paul's College
2025	St John's College
2026	St John's College

=== Tennis ===
Year	College
2011	St Paul's College
2012	St Andrew's College
2013	St Andrew's College
2014	St Paul's College
2015	St Paul's College
2016	St Paul's College
2017	St Paul's College
2018	St Paul's College
2019	St John's College
2020	St Paul's College
2021	St Andrew's College
2022	St John's College
2023	Wesley College
2024	Wesley College
2025	St John's College
2026	St Andrew's College

=== Basketball ===
Year	College
2011	St Andrew's College, Wesley College, St John's College
2012	St Andrew's College
2013	St Paul's College
2014	St Paul's College
2015	St Andrew's College, St Paul's College, Wesley College
2016	St Andrew's College
2017	Wesley College
2018	Wesley College
2019	Wesley College
2020	Wesley College, St Andrew's College, St Paul's College
2021	St Andrew's College
2022	St Andrew's College
2023	Wesley College
2024	Wesley College
2025	St John's College
2026	Wesley College

=== Athletics ===
Year	College
2011	St Andrew's College
2012	St Andrew's College
2013	St Andrew's College
2014	St Andrew's College
2015	St Andrew's College
2016	St Andrew's College
2017	St Paul's College
2018	St Andrew's College
2019	St Andrew's College
2020	St Andrew's College
2021	St Paul's College
2022	St Paul's College
2023	St Andrew's College
2024	St Paul's College
2025	St Paul's College
2026	St John's College
