= Frank Walker (writer, born 1954) =

Australian author

Frank William Walker (born 5 February 1954) is an Australian journalist and non-fiction writer. He writes non-fiction books, mostly on military history including about the British nuclear tests at Maralinga, in South Australia.

== Early life ==
Walker attended Newington College (1967–1972). He attended the University of Sydney and graduated as Bachelor of Arts majoring in history and political science. While at university he was a resident at St Andrew's College.

== Journalism ==
Walker worked as a journalist for 35 years, most recently as chief reporter for The Sun-Herald covering defence, veterans affairs, national security and terrorism. He worked on The Sydney Morning Herald, The National Times, for News Limited in New York City and Deutsche Welle international radio in Germany. In 1979 he worked for News Ltd in New York. From 1980 to 1984 he worked for Deutsche Welle in Cologne, Germany. From 1990 to 1993 he was The Sun-Herald correspondent in the USA. He is now a freelance journalist in Sydney and writes for the German newsagency DPA. He writes non-fiction books, mostly on military history. His first two books are both on Australian involvement in the Vietnam War. On 26 August 2014 his new book 'Maralinga - The chilling expose of our secret nuclear shame and betrayal of our troops and country' about British nuclear testing on Australian soil in the 1950s and 1960s was published by Hachette. It was immediately hailed by 'The Australian' newspaper as "powerful". More can be found at his website www.frankwalker.com.au.

== Publications ==
- The tiger man of Vietnam (Hachette Australia, 2010)
- Ghost platoon (Hachette Australia, 2011)
- Maralinga : the chilling exposé of our secret nuclear shame and betrayal of our troops and country (Hachette Australia, 2014)
- Commandos : Heroic and Deadly ANZAC Raids in World War II (Hachette Australia, 2015)
- Traitors : How Australia and its Allies Betrayed our Anzacs and let Nazi and Japanese War Criminals Go Free (Hachette Australia, 2017)
- The Scandalous Freddie McEvoy: The true story of the swashbuckling Australian rogue (Hachette Australia, 2018)
