= Bob Brissenden =

Australian poet, novelist, critic and reader

Bob Brissenden AO
- Born: Robert Francis Brissenden; 13 March 1928; Wentworthville, New South Wales
- Died: 7 April 1991 (aged 62); Canberra, Australian Capital Territory
- Spouse: Rosemary Lorna Groves

Robert Francis Brissenden AO (13 March 1928 – 7 April 1991) was an Australian poet, novelist, critic, and academic.

== Life ==
Brissenden was born on 13 March 1928 at Wentworthville, Sydney to schoolteacher Arthur Piercy Brissenden, and Nellie Annie (née Rogers). After studying at Bowral and Cowra high schools, Brissenden earned a scholarship to St Andrew's College, University of Sydney, where he achieved a Bachelor of Arts with honours and a Master of Arts.

In 1953, he was assistant lecturer at Canberra University College, under A. D. Hope, and was awarded a British Council grant to study at the University of Leeds, where he earned his PhD in 1956. He married political scientist Rosemary Lorna Groves in 1959.

Brissenden returned as an English lecturer at CUC, which was amalgamated with the Australian National University in 1960. At ANU, Brissenden was the Faculty of the Arts' first sub-dean and remained a lecturer and reader until 1985.

He was an associate editor of the Meanjin literary journal from 1959 until 1964, and literary editor of The Australian from 1964 to 1965.

In 1982, Brissenden was appointed Officer of the Order of Australia for services to literature.

Brissenden died at Royal Canberra Hospital of complications from Parkinson's on 7 April 1991 and was buried in Tharwa Road Lawn Cemetery in Queanbeyan.

== Bibliography ==
=== Poetry ===
- Gift of the Forest (1982)
- Winter Matins (1971)
- Elegies (1974)
- Building a Terrace (1975)
- The Whale in Darkness (1980)
- Gough and Johnny Were Lovers: Songs and Light Verse Celebrating Wine, Friendship and Political Scandal (1984)
- Sacred Sites (1990)
- Suddenly Evening (1993)

=== Fiction ===
- Poor Boy (1987) Allen & Unwin
- Wildcat (1991) Allen & Unwin

=== Criticism ===
- Samuel Richardson (1958)
- Patrick White (1964)
- Virtue in Distress: Studies in the Novel of Sentiment from Richardson to Sade (1974)
- A Fire-talented Tongue: Some Notes on the Poetry of Gwen Harwood (1978)
- New Currents in Australian Writing (1978)
- The Great Gatsby: A Critical Introduction (1987)
