= Hugh Taylor (rugby union) =

Australian rugby player (1900–1970)

- Born: Hugh Carlyle Taylor; 4 December 1900 Narrabri, Australia
- Died: 17 November 1970 (aged 69)
- School: Newington College
- University: St Andrew's College, University of Sydney
- Notable relative: Johnny Taylor (brother)

Rugby union career
- Position: Lock
International career
Years	Team	Apps	(Points)
1923–1924	Australia	4	

Hugh Carlyle Taylor (4 December 1900 – 17 November 1970) was an Australian rugby union player and represented for the Wallabies four times.

He attended Newington College (1906–1913) and St Andrew's College within the University of Sydney. In 1944, Taylor married Edith Jean Edwards in Mosman, New South Wales.
