= Johnny Taylor (sportsman) =

Australian sportsman (1895–1971)

John Taylor
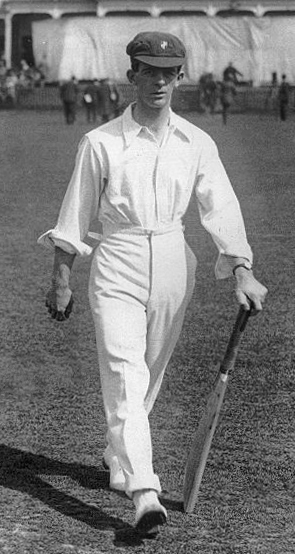
- Taylor in 1921
- Born: John Morris Taylor; 10 October 1895 Stanmore, New South Wales
- Died: 12 May 1971 (aged 75) Turramurra, New South Wales
- School: Newington College
- University: St Andrew's College; University of Sydney
- Notable relative: Hugh Taylor (brother)
- Occupation: Dentist

Rugby union career
- Position(s): fly-half, wing
International career
Years	Team	Apps	(Points)
1922	Wallabies	2	(15)
- Cricket career

Cricket information
- Batting: Right-handed

International information
- National side: Australia (1920–1926)
- Test debut (cap 112): 17 December 1920 v England
- Last Test: 10 July 1926 v England

Career statistics
Competition	Test	First-class
Matches	20	135
Runs scored	997	62,74
Batting average	35.60	33.37
100s/50s	1/8	11/38
Top score	108	180
Balls bowled	114	126
Wickets	1	1
Bowling average	45.00	53.00
5 wickets in innings	0	0
10 wickets in match	0	0
Best bowling	1/25	1/25
Catches/stumpings	11/–	68/–
- Source: Cricinfo, 12 October 2022

John Morris Taylor (10 October 1895 – 12 May 1971) was an Australian cricket and rugby union player.

He attended Newington College (1906–1915) and St Andrew's College within the University of Sydney. He served with the First Australian Imperial Force as an artillery gunner in World War I and at the conclusion of the war was selected to be part of the Australian Imperial Forces cricket team which played 28 first class matches in Britain, South Africa and Australia.

== Cricket career ==
Taylor played in 20 Tests between 1920 and 1926 and held the Australian 10th wicket partnership record with Arthur Mailey, set in Sydney in 1924/25 against England, until broken by Phillip Hughes and Ashton Agar, on 11 July 2013.

== Rugby union career ==
Taylor also played two rugby union tests for the Wallabies against the New Zealand Maoris in 1922.
