= Kevin Fagan (doctor) =

Australian doctor

Dr Kevin James Fagan AO (5 February 1909 – 1992) was an Australian medical doctor and World War II hero.

After attending St Ignatius' College, Riverview on a bursary, Fagan was Dux of the School in both 1925 and 1926, enabling him to study Medicine at the University of Sydney. He lived on campus at St John's College, University of Sydney from 1927 to 1932.

After graduation, he returned to Tasmania and became Superintendent of Hobart General Hospital in 1937. Shortly after the outbreak of World War II he joined the Army Medical Corps and was posted to Singapore in 1942 with the 8th Division. He was soon a prisoner-of-war of the Japanese, first in Changi and later on the infamous Thai-Burma Railway.

An outstanding surgeon, he was every bit as influential in his care of the sick and injured soldiers as the high-profile Sir Weary Dunlop. One of many testimonies from the Australian War Memorial reads:

'To many an unfortunate digger and others who rolled and tossed and cried out with the well nigh insufferable agony of those….. ulcers came a man who ceased suffering and pain and taking limbs off in many cases he put them on the road to home again. Yes Major Fagan, the diggers’ children will hear your name spoken with feelings of gratitude for many a long day to come. For the noble work you did, your name will be memorable'.

Kevin Fagan is memorialised by:

- Kevin Fagan House, the senior boarding house at St Ignatius' College, Riverview
- the Kevin Fagan Memorial at St John's College, University of Sydney.
- The main street of the village of Bookham NSW (close to his retirement home "Cooinda" on Burrinjuck Road) and formerly a section of the Hume Highway, which was renamed Fagan Drive in his honour.
