= St John's College, University of Sydney =

Residential college of the University of Sydney, Australia

St John's College
- University of Sydney
- Location: University of Sydney, H2; 10 Missenden Road, Camperdown NSW, 2050
- Coordinates: 33°53′19.32″S 151°10′54.66″E
- Full name: The College of St John the Evangelist
- Motto: Nisi Dominus Frustra (Latin)
- Motto in English: Unless the Lord is with us, we labor in vain
- Established: 1858
- Named for: St John the Evangelist – author of the fourth Gospel
- Former names: The College of St John the Evangelist
- Rector: Dr Mark Schembri
- Residents: 252
- Website: Homepage; Alumni Homepage

St John's College, or the College of St John the Evangelist, is a residential college within the University of Sydney.

Established in 1857, the college is the oldest Roman Catholic, and second-oldest overall, university college in Australia. St John's is a co-educational community of 252 undergraduate and postgraduate students. The rector, Mark Schembri, has held his position since 2022.

== History ==
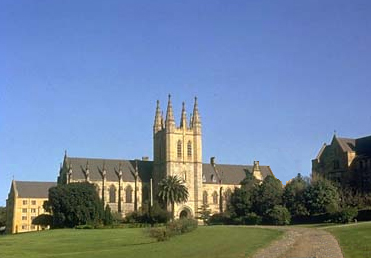
St John's College, built in the Gothic Revival style, as seen from Parramatta Road. Virtual Tour of St John's College

The College of St. John the Evangelist was founded by Archbishop John Bede Polding, who named it after the author of the fourth Gospel. The symbol of St John's College is the eagle, the traditional symbol of St. John. St. John's is the oldest Catholic tertiary educational institution in Australia, and the first Catholic college to be established in a preexisting, non-Catholic university in the English-speaking world since the Reformation.

In 1854, the first effort to establish a Catholic college within the University of Sydney was made at a meeting in old St Mary's Cathedral. The New South Wales government promised a pound-for-pound subsidy capped at a £20,000 limit, if at least £10,000 were raised by public subscription. The amount was met within six months from July 1857. On 15 December 1857, the act to incorporate St John's College as a college within the University of Sydney passed in the Parliament of New South Wales, and received the Royal Assent from Queen Victoria. The proclamation of the St John's College Council took place on 1 July 1858.

In 1887, James Francis Hogan wrote in The Irish in Australia that "Saint Ignatius' College, Riverview, St. Joseph's College, Hunters Hill and St John's College, affiliated to the University of Sydney, are three educational institutions which reflect the highest credit on the Catholic population of the parent colony".

=== English Benedictine influence ===
St. John's was established as a Benedictine foundation by Archbishop Polding, who had formerly been an English Benedictine monk at Downside Abbey. The English Benedictines were prominent in the raising of public support for the founding of St John's; Dom Maurus O'Connell, Dean of St Mary's Cathedral, Sydney, and the first Australian-born Benedictine priest, was appointed as the first rector of the college in 1858. When Roger Bede Vaughan, a former monk of Downside Abbey, arrived in Sydney as Polding's coadjutor bishop in 1873, he was elected by the fellows as rector. Vaughan retained the rectorship until he succeeded Polding as archbishop in his own right, but continued to live in the college and use it as his episcopal palace. Vaughan's secretary—Anselm Gillett, a monk of Ampleforth, who had been resident at Belmont Priory during Vaughan's time as superior before his departure for Australia—acted as rector during Vaughan's time as archbishop. After Vaughan's death and Gillett's return to England, another Benedictine, Fr. David Barry, was appointed rector in 1884. In the latter part of the 19th century, the College Council was dominated by clerical fellows who were Benedictine monks, and the majority of its students were affiliated with Benedictine Lyndhurst College, Glebe.

The carved Gothic-style reliquary box in the chapel contains the skull of St. Bede the Lesser, a Benedictine monk who died before AD 1000. The relic had been preserved in a reliquary in the church of St. Benignus at Genoa, served by the Benedictine monks of Monte Cassino until the early 19th century. The relic was transported to Sydney by the missionary priest Martial Mary and presented to Archbishop Vaughan while he was residing in the college.

== Governance ==
Government of the college is vested in the College Council by the 1857 Act of Incorporation The Council consists of the Rector and eighteen Fellows, six of whom must be Catholic clergy. The Catholic Archbishop of Sydney, currently the Most Rev. Anthony Fisher, takes the role of Visitor of the college. This is a largely ceremonial role, but he can also be called on to give guidance and resolve internal disputes. Under the direction of the Archbishop as Visitor, the college associates itself with the interests of the Church and its mission, particularly by the fostering of appropriate academic directions in education, charity, social justice, ethics and the environment.

=== Rectors ===
- (1858–1860) Maurus O'Connell OSB
- (1860–1874) John Forrest D.D.
- (1874–1877) Roger William Bede Vaughan OSB
- (1877–1883) Anselm Gillett OSB
- (1883–1884) Fr Daniel Clancy SJ
- (1884–1887) David Barry OSB
- (1887–1888) Patrick Murphy
- (1888–1915) James J. O'Brien
- (1915–1933) Maurice O'Reilly CM
- (1933–1958) John C. Thompson CM
- (1958–1958) William Cantwell CM (acting)
- (1958–1968) John Burnheim
- (1968–1969) Edmund Barry (acting)
- (1969–1977) Gregory Meere
- (1977–1980) Joseph Rheinberger VG
- (1980–1992) Lester Cashen OAM
- (1992–1994) Barry Tunks
- (1994–1995) Martin Milani (acting)
- (1995–2000) Marshal McMahon
- (2000–2000) Paul O'Donnell (acting)
- (2000–2000) Michael Connors
- (2001–2001) John Hill
- (2001–2002) Colin Fowler OP (acting)
- (2002–2008) David Daintree KHS
- (2009–2013) Michael Bongers
- (2013–2022) Adrian Diethelm
- (2022–present) Mark Schembri

=== Visitors ===
- (1858–1877) John Bede Polding OSB
- (1877–1883) Roger Bede Vaughan OSB
- (1884–1911) Patrick Francis Moran
- (1911–1940) Michael Kelly
- (1940–1971) Norman Gilroy
- (1971–1983) James Darcy Freeman
- (1983–2001) Edward Bede Clancy
- (2001–2014) George Pell
- (2014–present) Anthony Fisher

=== Fellows ===
St John's College has a number of honorary fellows. These are distinguished members of the university and wider community who have been selected to support the rector by representing the interests of the college in their own spheres and by mentoring students

=== Student club ===
The student club is the body that looks after much of the day-to-day activity of the students of the college. Formed in 1891, the club is governed by its own constitution and is led by its house committee. This committee is elected by the students at the end of each academic year. The activities of the club are varied, ranging across social, cultural, sporting, and disciplinary areas. The house committee comprises the House President, House Secretary, House Treasurer and six committee members.

== Architecture ==
=== Architects ===
In February 1859, William Wilkinson Wardell, the architect of St Mary's Cathedral, Sydney and St Patrick's Cathedral, Melbourne, was appointed the architect for St John's College. Working from his design for Melbourne, he drew up general plans and sent them to Sydney in May 1859. Wardell originally designed St. John's College as a three-story sandstone Gothic Revival building on an H-shaped plan. Because of budget restrictions, with a limit of £30,000, in July and August there was discussion of Wardell's design and of how much of it could be built. In September and October the general plans were approved by the St John's Council and the university senate.

From October 1859 to April 1860, relations between Wardell and the council deteriorated for various reasons, resulting in Wardell's resignation in June 1860. With the main building program already in progress, the council retained Wardell's plans and proceeded with the construction under the supervision of Edmund Blacket, another of Australia's best-known colonial architects, who had finished construction of the first stage of St. Paul's College, Sydney, the previous year. When Blacket was appointed to supervise the construction of St John's, several changes were made to Wardell's specifications: Australian hardwood was substituted for pitch pine, bar trusses were used in the chapel, a fountain was dropped from the plans, common rather than fire bricks were used, Portland stone was replaced by Colonel stone, and ornamental pillars were incorporated into the design of the library. Blacket estimated that these and other changes would save £1,689, leaving the amended quote at £35,754. When the college was finally occupied, the cost of construction for the first stage was £40,000.

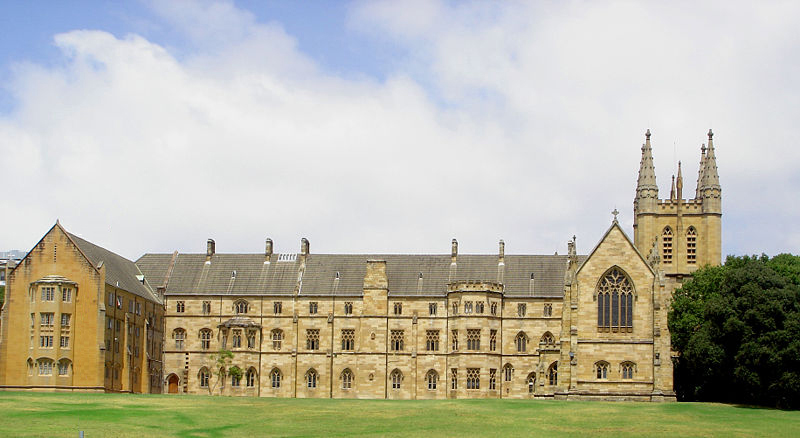
Eastern elevation from St John's oval, showing original building with new additions Menzies Wing (left) and Freehill Tower (right)

=== Original building ===
St John's College is perhaps the grandest Gothic Revival building in New South Wales. Designed by one of England's (and Australia's) foremost ecclesiastical architects of the mid-19th century, it is unique in Sydney collegiate architecture in its combination of scale, quality and construction. A rare realisation of Pugin's ideal Catholic college (and in turn based on Magdalen College, Oxford), it demonstrates the influence of Pugin on the work of William Wardell. It is a notable example of the period when Pugin's insistence on archaeological accuracy was giving way to the more eclectic influences of the High Victorian generation.

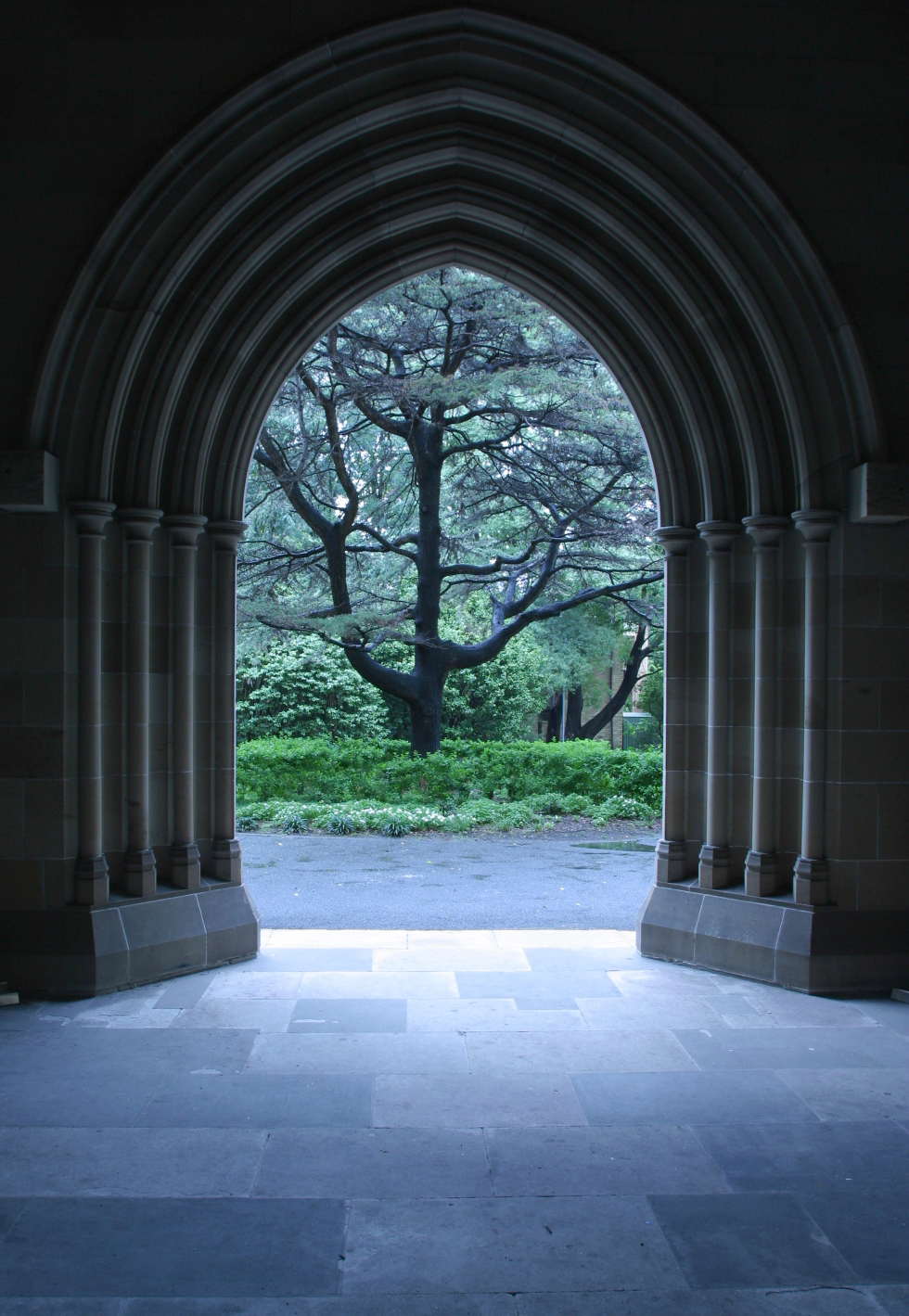
Freehill Tower foyer

Built entirely in sandstone, the college is 14th century English Gothic in style, and substantially Renaissance Baroque in plan, in the manner of Wardell's earlier monasteries and convents. The principal floor or piano nobile is above the ground floor and is related to a central space (the ante-chapel) by a series of classical enfilades. The arrangement of the ground floor entry vestibule, and the formal, axially linked Imperial staircase are equally classical in inspiration. In this respect St John's is unlike the traditional layout of an English university college. The formal parts of the building are very grand, particularly if compared to the almost domestic scale of Blacket's contemporary St Paul's College.

The main facade on the north wing is a typical exercise in Victorian near-symmetry, with the central tower nearly in the middle. Under the tower is a porte-cochère. Continuing south along the visitor's line of entry on the main axis is a visually low, dark vestibule. This enhances the view, through an open arcade and transverse passage, of the more brightly sidelit formal stone staircase. To the north of the stair hall on the principal floor is the central space. To the east of this space is the chapel, viewed through an arcaded screen. To the south is a vista across the stairwell, through an ante-room to the library and on to the students' accommodation. To the west is the Great Hall, although this was not visible from the central space on Wardell's original design. Lastly, through a wide opening to the north is the Lady Chapel in the tower.

==== Chapel and Lady Chapel ====
The Chapel of St John's College, unusual in being located on the first floor, was completed in 1863. The chapel has a plan that includes five bays. The two bays at the east end are distinguished as a chancel by a change in floor level. The eastern half of the chapel is in the traditional collegiate Choir arrangement. The details of the tracery and mouldings are late 13th and early 14th century English Gothic. There is a small gallery over the chapel, originally designed to enable invalids from the infirmary to hear Mass. The chapel is covered by a high wooden roof

Many of the sanctuary furnishings are believed to have been designed by Blackett in the 1860s, including the Blessed Sacrament shrine, which is made of Bondi Gold sandstone, the tabernacle, cedar choir stalls and pews. The walls of keyed sandstone were originally covered in plasterwork with Pugin-like decoration, but the plasterwork was completely removed in 1963. The chapel's wrought-iron gates were designed by Herbert Wardell and George Denning and installed in 1921. The chapel contains five stained glass windows, three of which were commissioned in 1918 from John Hardman and Co., Birmingham, with the design based on the writings of St. Bonaventure, quoted by Cardinal Newman. The eastern window, also from Hardman and Co., was presented to the college by Countess Freehill in 1937, in memory of her late husband, Francis Bede Freehill. The embellished sanctuary and Lady Chapel mosaics were also presented by Countess Freehill and laid by Melocco Co., in 1916–17 and 1937 respectively (approximately the same time as the Kelly Chapel floor at St Mary's Cathedral). The sanctuary features an oak reredos and panelling designed by Herbert Wardell, as well as two life-sized carved statues of the Virgin Mary and St. John the Evangelist, which were made by Koffmefer of Munich.

==== Great Hall ====
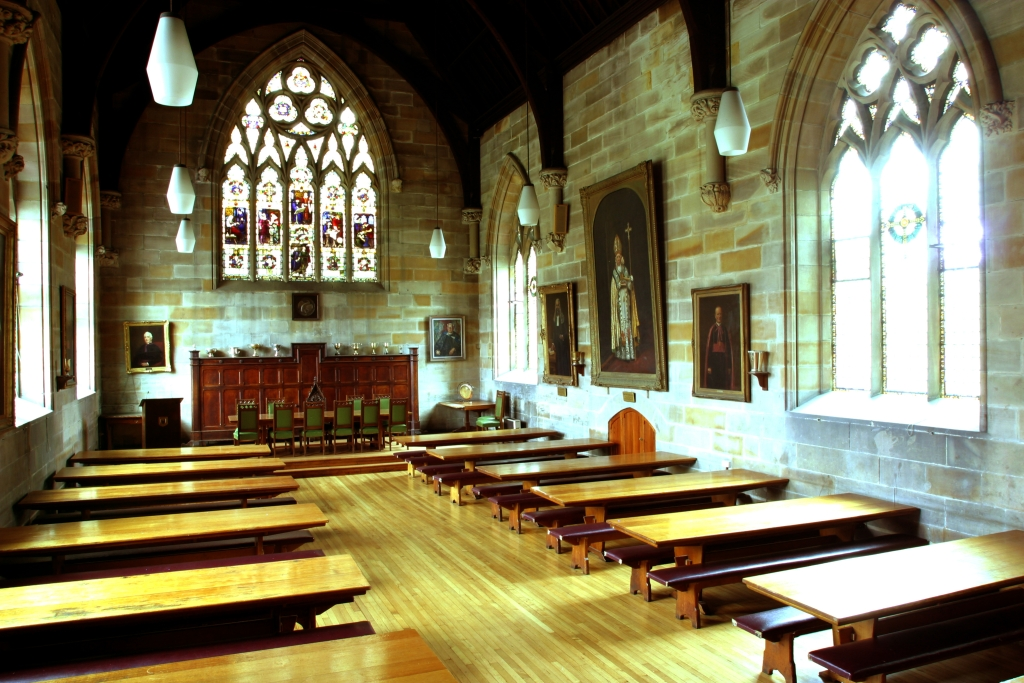
The Great Hall (dining hall)

The Great Hall, or dining hall, is a space with a large wooden roof of collar beams and arched braces, with king post and raking queen posts. Each truss is visually supported by short stone shafts with foliate capitals and corbels in the early 14th century manner, as is the tracery. The formal entry stairs intended to be placed to the south have never been built, and the original eastern wall has been replaced by an open arcade. On the western wall of the Great Hall is the Purcell Window, completed in 1930 by Hardman & Co. Birmingham. The upper windows contain the coats of arms of the universities of Sydney, Oxford (trefoils), Cambridge (trefoils), Paris (left soufflet) and St. John's College (right soufflet). The Great Hall has on display a collection of portraits of past visitors, rectors, fellows, and students, with the most significant portrait being Archbishop Polding / Gallery oil painting of Archbishop Polding DSB, 1866, by Eugene Montagu Scott (1835–1909), which was originally commissioned for St Mary's Cathedral.

==== Brennan Hall and library ====
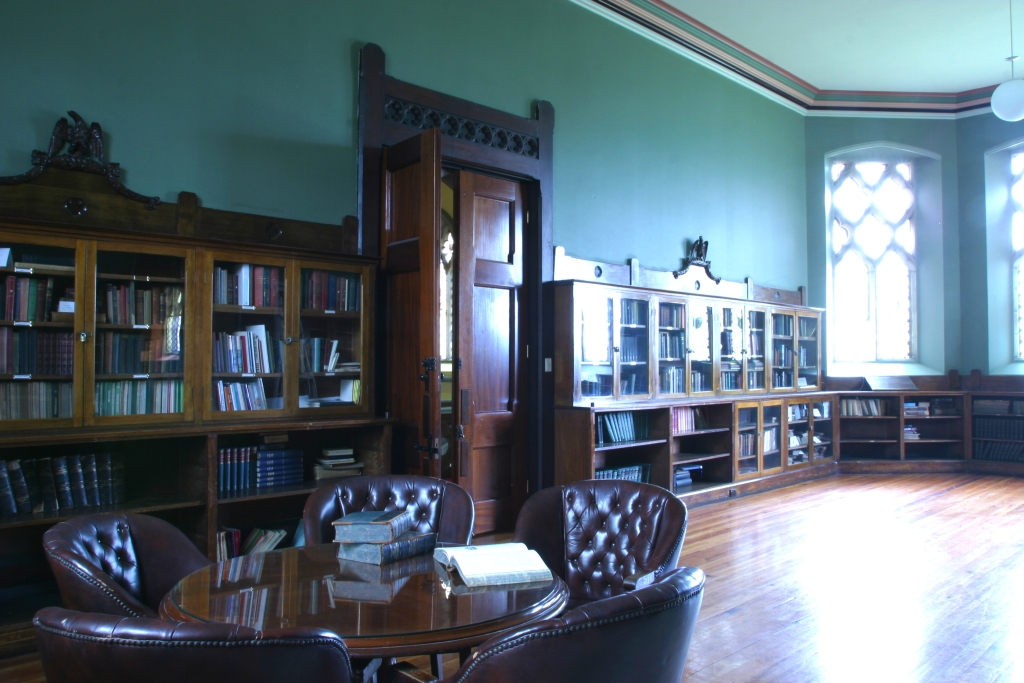
St John's College Library

Brennan Hall is named after the notable Australian poet and classical scholar Christopher Brennan (1870–1932), who was a regular visitor and close friend of Maurice J. O'Reilly, the then rector. Brennan Hall has a double arcade of slender wooden piers. Each pier has four engaged shafts with appropriate bases and capitals supporting arched braces. All motifs are in the 14th century manner, like the reticulated tracery in the square loaded windows. Brennan Hall is more grand than convenient, as it is a major thoroughfare.

The library holds several collections of books donated by past rectors and fellows of the college, contained in custom-made locked shelving units as a private library of books of historical relevance to the college. The stained glass windows on the eastern and western walls of the library are by Hardman & Co., Birmingham. The eastern windows contain the coats of arms of Bishop Davis, Archbishop Polding, St John's College, and Archbishop Vaughan. The western windows contain the coat of arms of William Bernard Ullathorne, Cardinal Moran and Archbishop Kelly.

=== Later developments: 1918–present ===
In 1918, Wardell's son, Herbert, working with his partner George Denning, designed what is known as the '38 wing (it was eventually begun in 1938), estimating the cost at £14,000. Construction was not started for 20 years because of lack of funds and was finally finished on a reduced scale in 1939.

In 1937 Countess Freehill donated £15,000 to the college on the conditions that it be used for the erection of the tower and that Hennessy and Hennessy be the architects. The design for the tower was 10 metres shorter than Wardell would have liked. Wardell believed that without the full height of the tower, the horizontal aspect of the building would not be balanced. Nonetheless, the tower was built to the amended design.

The 1960s saw great activity, with extensions to the college. In 1961, one hundred years after the first construction, Menzies Wing On the east end of the South Range was begun. The architects were McDonell, Mar and Anderson. The Menzies Wing was opened by the Right Honourable Robert Menzies and blessed by Cardinal Norman Gilroy on 14 May 1961. In 1962 the refectory was extended through to where the sacristies were, leaving an open arcade where the eastern wall had been. The Polding Wing was built on the west end of the South Range in 1967 and opened by Sir Roden Cutler and blessed by Archbishop James Carroll on 26 November 1967. Although these wings are four-storeyed and very different from the design of Wardell, the architects have looked back to his design for guidance and inspiration. Their modifications of Wardell's original design enabled the present building to accommodate 181 students.

Named after the Patron of the 150th Anniversary Capital Appeal, Michael Hintze (John’s 74 – 76), the Hintze Building was opened in 2010, as a new wing adjacent to Missenden Road, with attendees including His Eminence Cardinal Pell (Catholic Archbishop of Sydney) and Her Excellency Professor Marie Bashir (Governor of New South Wales and Chancellor of the University of Sydney). The new wing included 73 double ensuite rooms for students and apartments on the fourth level for the Rector and family, the Dean of Students, tutors and visiting academics.

== Student life ==
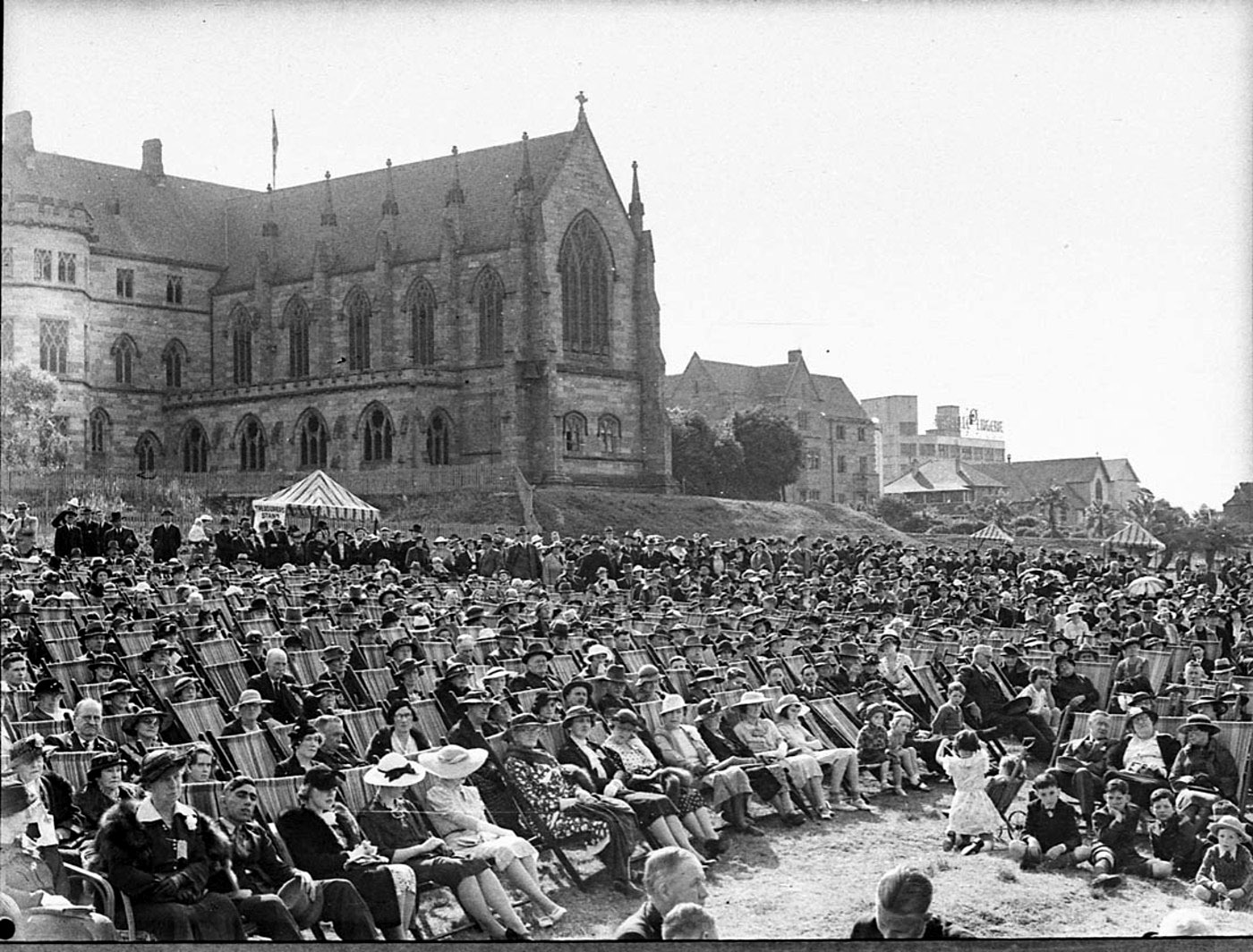
Crowds on the front lawns, 1936

St. John's College offers a traditional Oxbridge-style "collegial" experience of university life, situated on grounds within the University of Sydney's main campus.

=== Academic life ===
The college is primarily an academic community. Academic assistance is provided to scholars by the academic coordinator, assisted by a team of resident and non-resident tutors comprising senior and postgraduate scholars and university teaching staff and academics. The tutorial program is comprehensive (over 50 subjects per week), designed to supplement the teaching programs provided by the university.

=== Chapel ===
The St. John's College chapel was completed in 1863 in the Gothic Revival style as part of the northern wing and longitudinal arm of the college. The chapel is actively used as a place of worship and also for weddings, concerts, and other college events. Catholic Mass is celebrated in the chapel weekly on Sundays at 5.30 pm during the academic year, and on other important liturgical occasions. Each Wednesday after formal dinner night prayer is held in the chapel. Adoration and Benediction is held regularly throughout the semester and during stu-vac. All students of the college are encouraged to worship as a community, and the chapel is kept open at all times for prayer and personal reflection.

=== Formal dinners ===
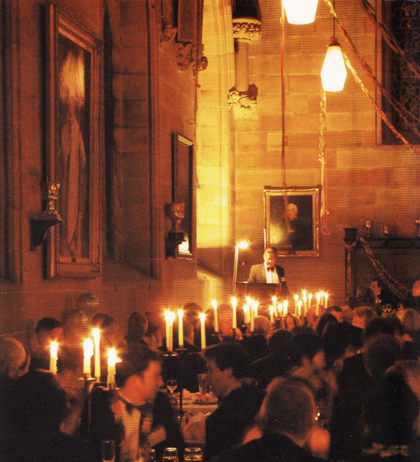
Formal dinner in the Great Hall

Formal dinners are held at 6.30 pm on Mondays and Wednesdays throughout the academic year. Attendance is mandatory and all members of the college must wear an academic gown and dress appropriately – men with jacket and tie, women in dress or skirt. There are ample occasions during the academic year when either black tie or lounge suit for men and ballgown or evening gown for women are worn, depending on the event. At formal dinners, traditional formalities are observed. Students enter the Hall and stand in place prior to the arrival of the members of High Table – the Rector, members of the Senior Common Room and other invited guests – who process in after the gong has been sounded. Grace is then said in Latin. Late arrivals should bow to the Rector (or Visitor) and be acknowledged. It is considered discourteous to leave the Hall before the final Grace.

=== Sport ===
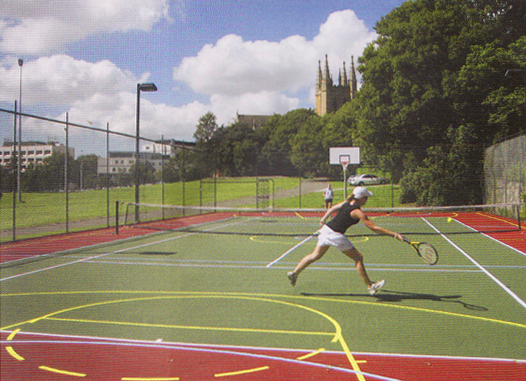
College tennis courts and sports grounds

Sport is an important aspect of collegial life. St. John's College teams compete against the other Sydney colleges in a wide range of sports for the Rawson Cup (men's sport) and the Rosebowl Cup (women's). The Rawson Cup was donated by Sir Harry Rawson in 1906. The Rawson sports are played throughout the university year, including cricket, rowing, rugby, swimming and diving, soccer, tennis, basketball, and athletics. Other sports which feature in the Rosebowl Cup are hockey, netball and softball.

The college has expansive sporting facilities, including a rugby oval, football oval, cricket nets, and floodlit tennis and basketball courts. All college residents are also members of Sydney Uni Sport and Fitness and are entitled to access to all exclusive member benefits and services, including three on-campus gymnasiums and an indoor aquatic centre.

=== Social and cultural ===
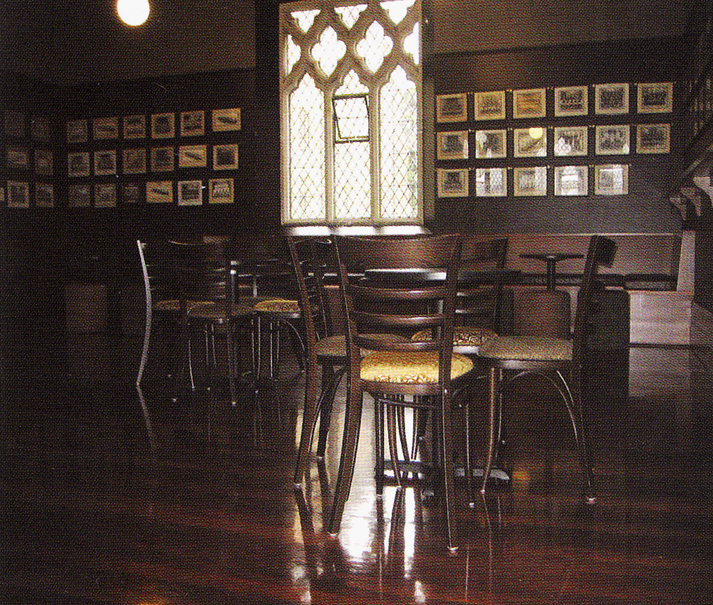
The Dail, bar next to Junior Common Room

Major events each year include a college play, an informal, and two black tie formal, balls, and the intercollegiate debating competition. The Student Club operates a bar, 'The Dail', in the area adjacent to the Junior Common Room.

=== Music and drama ===
The college choir sings at Mass in the chapel regularly and also performs on other occasions. Concerts to showcase the musical talents of students are presented each year. Arts of Gold is a bi-annual event which showcases the artistic talents of St. John's students to raise money for a selected charity. The college takes part in the Intercollegiate Debating Cup every year, competing with the other colleges of the University of Sydney. Competition is of a high standard, with many college teams consisting of university debaters.

The college competes in the Palladian Cup, in which the colleges compete in solo and group instrumental and dramatic performance. St. John's won the Palladian Cup in 2007 and 2019.

The college enjoys a close relationship with Capella Sublima, an a cappella vocal consort based at St. John's College, where its singers rehearse. In the European Renaissance, a cappella was a group of musicians attached to a cathedral or the court of a monarch. Capella Sublima specialises in choral masterworks of the European Renaissance. Its extensive repertoire includes Josquin, Lassus, Palestrina, Victoria, Guerrero, Tallis and others. Capella Sublima have been recorded for broadcast by ABC Classic FM and numerous other Sydney radio stations.

=== International students ===
Currently over ten per cent of St. John's residents come from overseas. Students are present from the United States, Canada, China and Hong Kong, Great Britain, Ireland, New Zealand, Zimbabwe, and South Africa.

== Distinguished alumni ==
=== Politics ===
- Tony Abbott – former Prime Minister of Australia
- Joe Hockey – former Treasurer of Australia
- Frank Sartor – former NSW minister for planning, former minister for Redfern Waterloo, former minister for the arts, and former lord mayor of the City of Sydney
- Peter Collins – former NSW leader of the opposition, former NSW minister for health, former NSW attorney-general and former treasurer of NSW.
- Greg Bartels – former mayor of City of Willoughby and former secretary of the New South Wales Liberal Party. Bartels Park in Chatswood is named after Greg Bartels.

=== Law ===
- Justice Richard O'Connor QC – former member of the New South Wales Legislative Council and solicitor-general; former member of the Australian Senate and, in the ministry of Edmund Barton, leader of government in the Senate; and founding justice of the High Court of Australia
- Justice Sir Cyril Walsh KBE PC – former Justice of the High Court of Australia
- Justice Roddy Meagher AO QC LLD (honoris causa) (Syd) – barrister, legal scholar and former Justice of the Court of Appeal, Supreme Court of New South Wales
- Justice John Hailes Flood Nagle AO QC – former Justice of the Supreme Court of New South Wales, Chief Judge at Common Law, and Royal Commissioner into NSW prisons. He was also president of the board of trustees of the Art Gallery of NSW.
- Justice Hugh Dennis Macrossan – former Justice of the Supreme Court of Queensland; appointed Senior Puisne Judge in 1926; appointed chief justice, Supreme Court of Queensland in 1940.
- John A. McCarthy QC – barrister and Australian Ambassador to the Holy See

=== Business ===
- Sir David Higgins – chief executive of Network Rail and former CEO of the London 2012 Olympic Delivery Authority and of Lend Lease Corporation
- Sir Michael Hintze GCSG, AM – founder and CEO of asset managers CQS Management
- Francis Bede Freehill – a founder of the City Mutual Life Assurance Society Ltd., director of the Australian Newspaper Co. Ltd., and co-founder of the Catholic Press

=== Diplomacy ===
- Michael L'Estrange AO – former secretary of the Department of Foreign Affairs and Trade, former Australian High Commissioner to the United Kingdom, and Rhodes Scholar

=== Academics ===
- Paul D. Scully-Power AM – Australia's first astronaut, former chairman of the Australian Civil Aviation Safety Authority, former chief technology officer of Tenix, and former chancellor of Bond University
- James Franklin – historian, mathematician, and philosopher

=== Sport ===
- Luke Burgess – former NSW Waratahs and Wallaby Halfback.
- Sam Carter – Brumbies and Wallabies Lock
- Ed Fernon – Olympic Modern Pentathlete
- Nathan Haas – UCI WorldTour cyclist on team Garmin–Cervélo
- Richard St John Honner – Australian Olympian (1926 – 400m, 400m hurdles, long jump)
- Paddy Ryan – Waratahs and Wallabies Prop
- Daniel Vickerman – former Waratah and Wallaby

=== Rhodes Scholars ===
- Terence Glasheen MBE (1938)
- Air Vice-Marshal Colin Hingston AM (1972)
- Michael L'Estrange AO (1976)
- The Hon Tony Abbott MP (1981)

=== Order of Australia and Order of the British Empire recipients ===
- James Dwyer McGee (1952 – OBE)
- Kevin Fagan (1987 – AO – In recognition of service to the welfare of ex-service personnel, to medicine and to the community)
- William Norman "Bill" Peach (1991 – AM – For service to the media and to tourism)
- Colin Hingston AM (2000 – AM – For exceptional service to the Australian Defence Force in the field of Strategic Logistics and, in particular, as Head National Support)
- Frank Sartor (2002 – AO – For service to the community, particularly through the implementation of plans to improve facilities and infrastructure in the City of Sydney, and to support for the Olympic and Paralympic Games)
- Justice Roddy Meagher (2005 – AO – For service to the judiciary, to legal scholarship and professional development, and to the arts)
- Michael L'Estrange (2007 – AO – For service to the development and implementation of public policy in Australia, particularly national security and foreign policy, and to international relations through fostering diplomatic, trade and cultural interests, including strengthening Australia's relationship with the United Kingdom)

=== Papal knighthood recipients ===
- John Lane Mullins KCSG (1920)
- Hugh Dennis Macrossan KCSG (1929)
- Michael Hintze KCSG (2005)
- Walter Burfitt KCSS (1940)
