= Samuel Angus =

Professor at University of Sydney

- Born: August 11, 1881; County Antrim, Ireland
- Died: November 17, 1943 (aged 62); Paddington, New South Wales, Australia

Academic background
- Education: Princeton University; University of Galway

Academic work
- Discipline: Bible studies
- Institutions: Columbia University; Sydney University; Hartford Seminary

Samuel Angus (27 August 1881 – 17 November 1943) was professor of New Testament and Church History at St Andrew's College in the University of Sydney from 1915 to 1943.

== Early life ==
Angus was born near Ballymena, County Antrim, Ireland, the eldest son of John Cowan Angus, farmer, and his wife Sarah, née Harper. He studied at the Collegiate School, Ballymena, and won a scholarship to Queen's College, Galway, receiving a B.A. in 1902 and an M.A. in 1903. He earned a second M.A. and a PhD from Princeton University. He attended Princeton Theological Seminary, but did not complete a degree.

== Career ==
In 1912 Angus was licensed as a probationer for the ministry in the United Free Church of Scotland and was appointed as a chaplain Church in Algiers, before being elected to St Andrew's College, University of Sydney in 1915. He held a lectureship at Hartford Theological Seminary from 1906 to 1910 and another in Louisville, Kentucky in 1912. Angus served as Visiting Professor of Education at Columbia University from 1929 to 1931.

Angus also spent some time as the Curator at Nicholson Museum in Sydney.

Angus's outspoken views of Christian theology were criticised by the Presbyterian Church of Australia, leading to formal charges of heresy. Angus was later acquitted of these charges after an investigation conducted by the Juridical Commission of the Church.

Angus rejected many of the core traditional Christian beliefs, including the doctrine of the Trinity, the Biblical inspiration, the virgin birth and bodily resurrection of Christ.

== Works ==
- Truth and Tradition: a Plea for Practical and Vital Religion and for Reinterpretation of Ancient Theologies, Sydney 1934
- The Mystery Religions and Christianity (1925)
- The Religious Quests of the Graeco-Roman World: A Study in the Historical Background of Early Christianity (June 1929), Biblo-Moser ISBN 0-8196-0196-9 ISBN 978-0819601964
- The Sources of the First Ten Books of Augustine's De Civitate Dei (1906)
- The Environment of Early Christianity (1914), Studies in Theology C. Scribner ASIN B00088EPA0
- What Is A Mystery Religion? (?)
- Christianity and dogma (1933), Angus & Robertson ASIN B00088YJZ6
- Forgiveness and life (Posthumously 1962); Chapters from an uncompleted book, "The Historical Approach to Jesus." Publisher: Angus and Robertson ASIN B0007JN3FS
- The koine: The language of the New Testament (1910) Princeton University Press ASIN B0008BGFM8
- Man and the new order (1941), Angus and Robertson ASIN B0007JZWKW
- Religion in national life: Address to the University Association of Canberra, 6 October 1933 ASIN 00088YJYW
- Alms for oblivion: chapters from a heretic's life (1943), Angus and Robertson

== Family ==
Angus married Katherine Duryea in 1907; they had no children.

== See also ==
- Henosis
- Gnosis
