= St Paul's College, University of Sydney =

Anglican residential college within the University of Sydney in Sydney, Australia

St Paul's College
- The University of Sydney
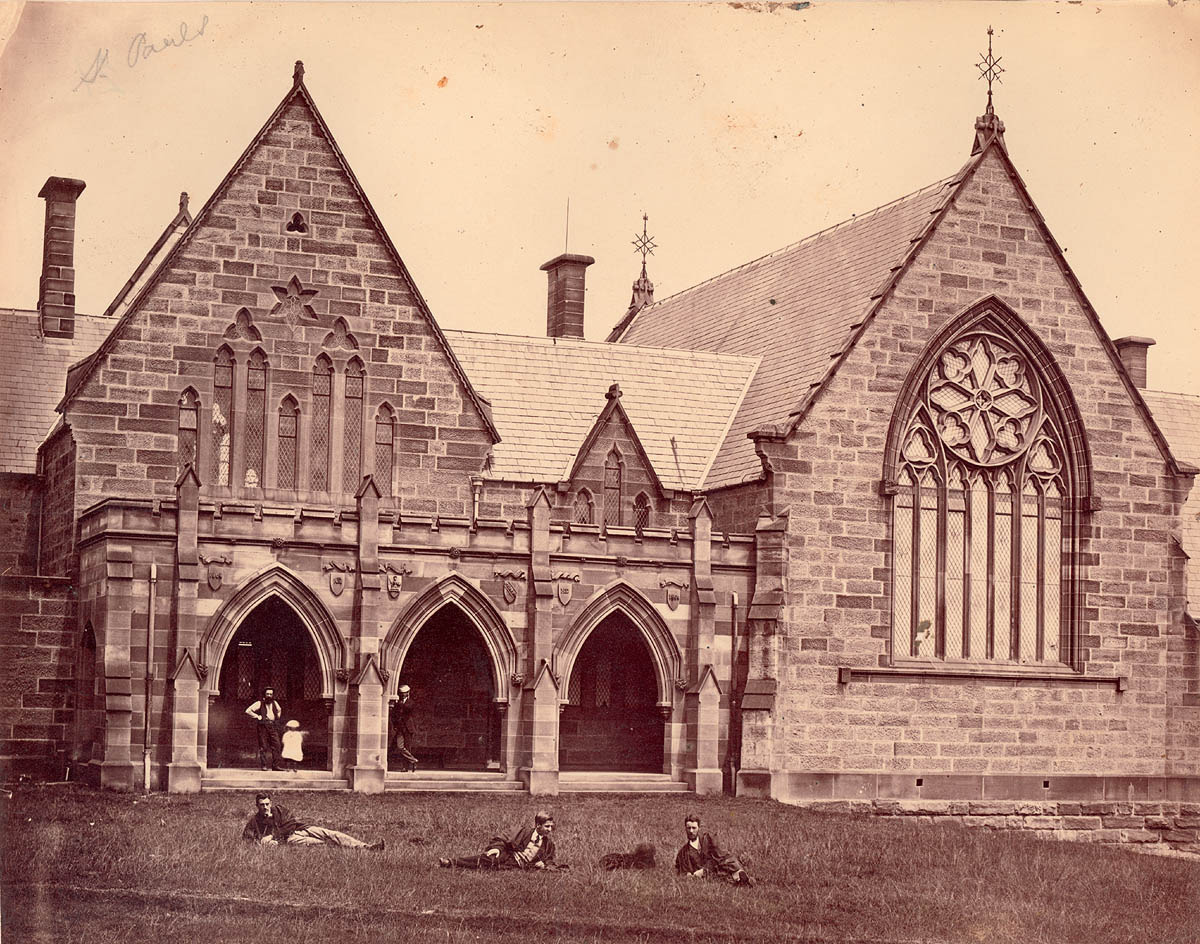
- Common room and dining hall, photographed from the main quadrangle in the 1870s

- Location: 9 City Road, Camperdown, City of Sydney, New South Wales, Australia
- Coordinates: 33°53′24″S 151°11′15″E
- Full name: St Paul's College
- Motto: Deo Patriae Tibi (Latin)
- Motto in English: "For God, Country and Thyself"
- Established: 1856; 170 years ago
- Named for: Paul the Apostle
- Gender: Co-educational
- Warden: Reverend Dr Edward Loane
- Residents: 400
- Undergraduates: 294
- Postgraduates: 120
- Called: Paulines
- Website: stpauls.edu.au

St Paul's College
- Location in greater Sydney
- Building details

General information
- Architectural style: Gothic Revival (main Early Gothic with some Perpendicular Gothic); Edwardian Gothic Revival (Gatekeeper's Lodge)

Technical details
- Material: Sydney sandstone; Slate tiled roof; Clinker bricks; Copper roof

Design and construction
- Architects: Edmund Blacket (1856); Cyril Blacket (1887-1915); Walter Liberty Vernon (1898)

Renovating team
- Renovating firm: Stephenson & Turner (1947)

New South Wales Heritage Database (Local Government Register)
- Official name: St Paul's College Group, University of Sydney
- Type: Local environment plan
- Designated: 14 December 2012
- Reference no.: I52
- Type: Built
- Category: Other

St Paul's College (commonly known as Paul's) is an Anglican residential college within the University of Sydney in Sydney, Australia. Founded in 1856, it is Australia's oldest university college. Its alumni, referred to as "Old Paulines", include prime ministers, deputy prime ministers, federal and state government ministers, High Court of Australia justices, Court of Appeal presidents and justices, Supreme Court chief justices and justices, pioneering surgeons and physicists, Australian of the Year recipients and 29 Rhodes Scholars.

The College has nearly 420 residents, of whom about 300 are undergraduate men and women; the remainder are postgraduate men and women undertaking further study or holding university positions. In 2019, the College opened Graduate House at St Paul's College, a community of 140 postgraduate students and university academics with its own additional facilities on the grounds. In 2023 it became fully co-residential, opening to male and female undergraduates. It retains most of its original 7-hectare (18-acre) grant and has its own oval.

== History ==
St Paul's was the first university college established in Australia. It was founded in 1856 following an unsuccessful attempt by members of the Anglican Church to incorporate the earlier St James's College within the new University of Sydney. The founders of the University of Sydney had initially intended to emulate the collegiate structure of Oxford and Cambridge, and the founding of St Paul's as the first of the colleges was a key development as part of this vision.

The original building was designed in Gothic style by English-born architect Edmund Blacket. Blacket was a distinguished ecclesiastical architect; he also designed the main university building and would go on to supervise the construction of the Catholic St John's College at the same university. Other buildings include a chapel (designed by John Leslie Stephen Mansfield and completed in 1960) and a residential wing designed by Clive Lucas, Stapleton & Partners which opened in 1999.

By this time the College had its own distinct intellectual tradition, foreshadowed by the founders, a liberal Anglicanism which took seriously the challenges involved in combining religious and secular knowledge and in making the English Church useful to the Australian nation. The number of Paulines from this period who are now listed in the Australian Dictionary of Biography is evidence of the way the College was in step with the times.

The new governing document provides for a college council with 12 fellows, four of whom must be elected Anglican clergy, six elected laymen and two appointed laymen - of which one must be a University of Sydney academic. Fellows serve six-year, renewable terms and are elected by graduates of the College who have spent at least three semesters in residence. The College is an independent body corporate, legally designated as "The Warden and Fellows of St Paul's College".

At the 2010 World University Debating Championship two former Paul's students (Chris Croke and Steve Hind) took the title, winning the final against teams from Oxford, Harvard and the London School of Economics. Since the 1890s, the College has fostered social-justice ideals (as part of the liberal Anglican tradition) and most students are involved at some point in philanthropic activities. During the first decade of the 21st century, half the male Rhodes Scholars from Sydney University have been Paulines. In 2010, Jack Manning Bancroft was named NSW Young Australian of the Year for his work in indigenous education.

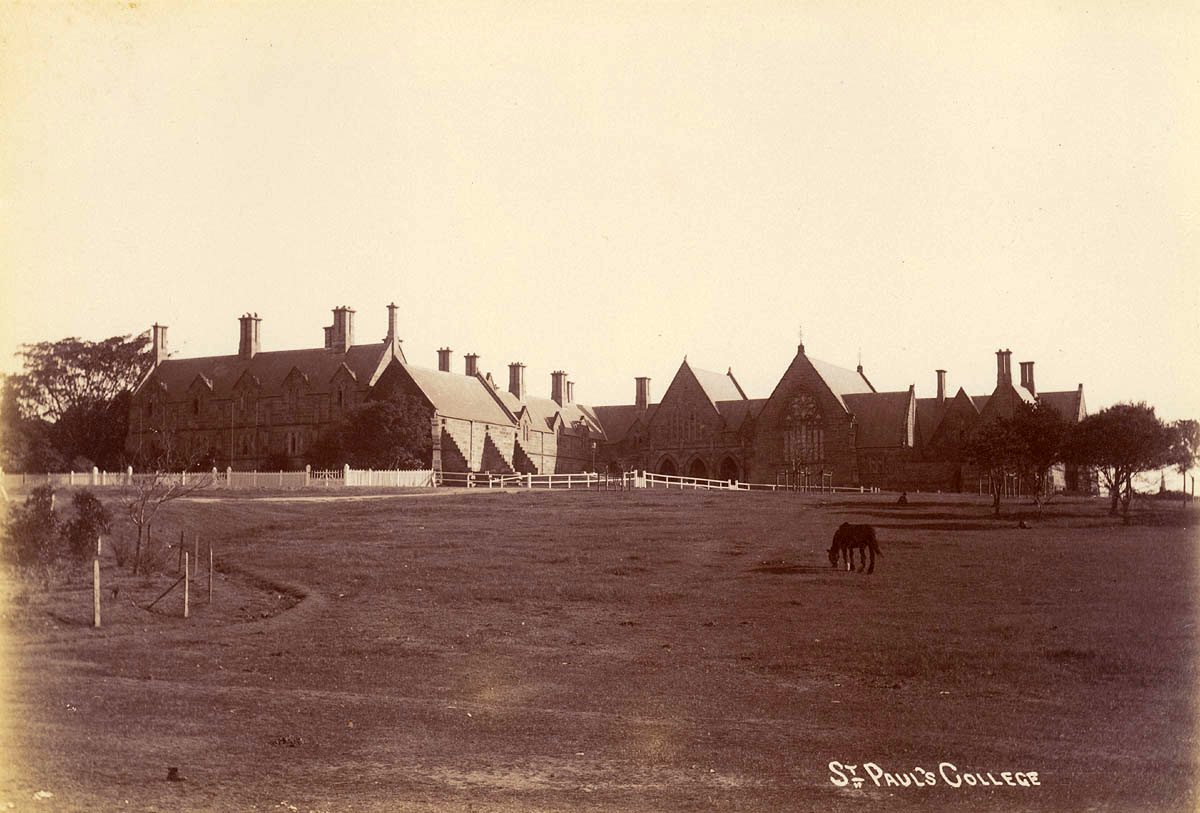
St Paul's College from the edge of its boundary with the university campus at the turn of the 20th century

== Heraldry ==
Officially granted by the Earl Marshal in 1961, the College coat of arms displays crossed swords and the Maltese cross to represent St Paul in the official colours of gold and gules. The College motto, Deo Patriae Tibi, can be translated "For God, Country and Thyself" or, more poetically, "God, Thy Native Land and Thee."

== Academic honours ==
The College boasts a long list of academic honours and its website lists many University Medallists since 2005. Its Rhodes Scholarship list is given below:

- 1907 – Garnet Vere Portus (1883–1954; in College 1903–04), afterwards cleric, Professor of History and Political Science, University of Adelaide, and radio broadcaster
- 1908 – Richard Granville Waddy (1885–1974; in College 1905–09), afterwards medical practitioner
- 1911 – Hugh Kingsley Ward (1887–1972; in College 1909–10), afterwards Professor of Bacteriology, University of Sydney
- 1915 – Walter Ferguson Crawford (1894–1978; in College 1913–14), afterwards knighted, Governor of Northern Sudan
- 1920 – Vernon Haddon Treatt (1897–1984; in College 1915–16), afterwards knighted, NSW Minister for Justice and Chief Commissioner for the City of Sydney
- 1925 – Allan Robert Callaghan (1903–93; in College 1922–24), afterwards knighted and South Australian Director of Agriculture
- 1931 – David Arthur Garnsey (1909–96; in College 1927–29), afterwards Bishop of Gippsland
- 1935 – Keith Noel Everal Bradfield (1910–2006; in College 1930–33), afterwards OBE and Civil Aviation Advisor to the Government of Papua New Guinea
- 1939 – Walter Laurence Hughes (1917–99; in College 1934–38), afterwards Kt, head of an engineering and shipbuilding firm and government adviser
- 1940 – Basil Holmes Travers (1919–98; in College 1938–39), afterwards Headmaster of Shore
- 1946 – William Winslow Woodward (1920–87; in College 1939–40), afterwards medical practitioner
- 1948 – Louis Walter Davies (1923–2001; in College 1941), afterwards AO and Professor of Electrical Engineering, University of NSW
- 1951 – Adrian Peter Henchman (1927–89; in College 1946–50), afterwards Sydney solicitor
- 1953 – James Graham McLeod (b 1932; in College 1949–53), afterwards AO and Professor of Neurology, Sydney University
- 1956 – John Maxwell Bailey (b 1935; in College 1954), afterwards attached to the European Atomic Energy Commission, Geneva
- 1960 – Malcolm John Swinburn (b 1937; in College 1956–60), afterwards a medical practitioner
- 1961 – Peter Garnsey (b 1938; in College 1956–60), afterwards Professor of the History of Classical Antiquity, Cambridge, and Fellow of Jesus College
- 1964 – John Dyson Heydon (b 1943; in College 1960–64), afterwards AC and High Court justice
- 1975 – Peter Edward King (b 1952; in College 1971–75), afterwards Sydney barrister and Federal MP
- 1990 – Andrew Scott Bell (b 1966; in College 1985–89), afterwards Sydney barrister (SC), Chief Justice and Lieutenant Governor of NSW
- 1992 – Scott Nixon (b 1968; in College 1986–91), afterwards Sydney barrister
- 1995 – Peter Raymond Barnett (b 1971; in College 1990–94), afterwards UK businessman and philanthropist
- 2001 – Andrew Henry Charlton (b 1978; in College 1997–99), afterwards Director of AlphaBeta and Federal MP
- 2003 – Benjamin Juratowitch (b 1978; in College 1998), afterwards Paris barrister (QC)
- 2007 – Eric Ronald Wing-Fai Knight (b 1983; in College 2002–04), afterwards Associate Professor and Pro-Vice-Chancellor (Research, Enterprise and Engagement), University of Sydney
- 2009 – Nikolas Norman Patrick Kirby (b 1984; in College 2005–09), afterwards Research Fellow in Philosophy and Public Policy, Blavatnik School of Government, Oxford
- 2010 – David Colin Conway Llewellyn (b 1985; in College 2006–09), afterwards CEO of the Good Lad Initiative and DJS Antibodies
- 2011 – Nathaniel Jon Ware (b 1988; in College 2009–11), afterwards social impact economist
- 2013 – Patrick Harry Brian Bateman (b 1987; in College 2006-10), afterwards management consultant and policy adviser

== Wardens ==
The following individuals have served as Warden of St Paul's College:

Ordinal	Officeholder	Term start	Term end	Time in office	Notes
1	The Revd Henry Judge Hose	1856	1862	5–6 years	
2	The Revd William Henry Savigny	1862	1865	2–3 years	
3	The Revd William Scott	1865	1877	11–12 years	Former NSW government astronomer
4	The Revd Canon William Hey Sharp	1878	1908	29–30 years	
5	The Revd Lewis Bostock Radford	1909	1915	5–6 years	Afterwards Bishop of Goulburn
6	The Revd Canon Arthur Henry Garnsey	1916	1944	27–28 years	
7	The Revd Felix Raymond Arnott	1946	1963	16–17 years	Afterwards Archbishop of Brisbane
8	The Revd Canon Alexander Peter Bruce Bennie	1964	1985	20–21 years	
9	The Right Revd Maxwell McNee Thomas	1985	1994	8–9 years	Former Bishop of Wangaratta
10	The Revd Canon Dr Ivan Francis Head	1994	2017	22–23 years	
11	Donald John Markwell	2018	2019	1–2 years	Former warden of Rhodes House, Oxford
12	The Revd Dr Edward Loane	2020		5–6 years	

== Notable alumni ==
Alumni of St Paul's College are referred to as Old Paulines. Alumni include two former Prime Ministers, three High Court judges, Supreme Court judges and 29 Rhodes Scholars, as well as influential figures in business, the law, public service, religion, science, the arts and sports.

Among the most notable Old Paulines are Sir William McMahon, 20th Prime Minister of Australia (1971–1972), Gough Whitlam, 21st Prime Minister of Australia (1972 to 1975), John Anderson, former Deputy Prime Minister of Australia (1999-2005), incumbent Chief Justice of New South Wales Andrew Bell, prominent barrister Bret Walker, journalist Tony Jones, cricketer Ed Cowan, media proprietor Warwick Oswald Fairfax and comedian Adam Spencer.

== Controversy ==
In June 2012, an article in a local Australian newspaper critical of an event with the theme "End of the British Raj". College students adopted a dress code of "white tie or colonial uniform", and were served by the usual college catering staff, many of Indian and south Asian descent, dressed in colourful traditional cultural garments. On 6 June 2012, the University Student Representative Council passed a motion condemning the themed party by writing a letter to the College's spokesman and the Warden asking for an explanation. Later, many Indian media groups covered this news with copies of the original Sydney Morning Herald article.

Allegations of sexism surfaced in 2017 following a post on the College's Facebook page which compared women to "harpooned whales". The College declined to participate in a university-wide review into culture led by Elizabeth Broderick, instead planning to undertake their own externally managed review. Michael Spence, the vice-chancellor of the University of Sydney, raised concerns regarding the "deep contempt for women" and the "cultural problems" at the College. In June 2017, Ivan Head, the Warden of the College, who had been in the role for 22 years, retired amid concerns regarding his leadership. Following Broderick's review into college culture at the University of Sydney's colleges, St Paul's released a response in which it indicated it would address all recommendations.

In 2024, the college expelled 6 students and suspended an additional 21 due to their involvement in the alleged abuse of another student either as bystanders or perpetrators. Following the incident, the college committed to an investigation of the incident as well as reviewing training programs provided to new students, steps that were supported by the University of Sydney in a statement about the incident.

== Gallery ==
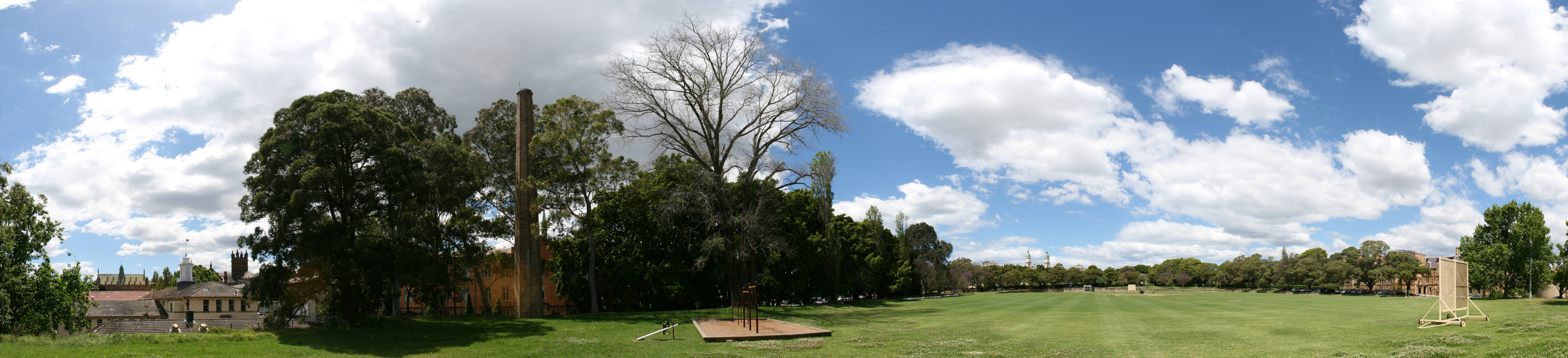
Panorama of St Paul's Oval, with the College located behind the trees at the far right
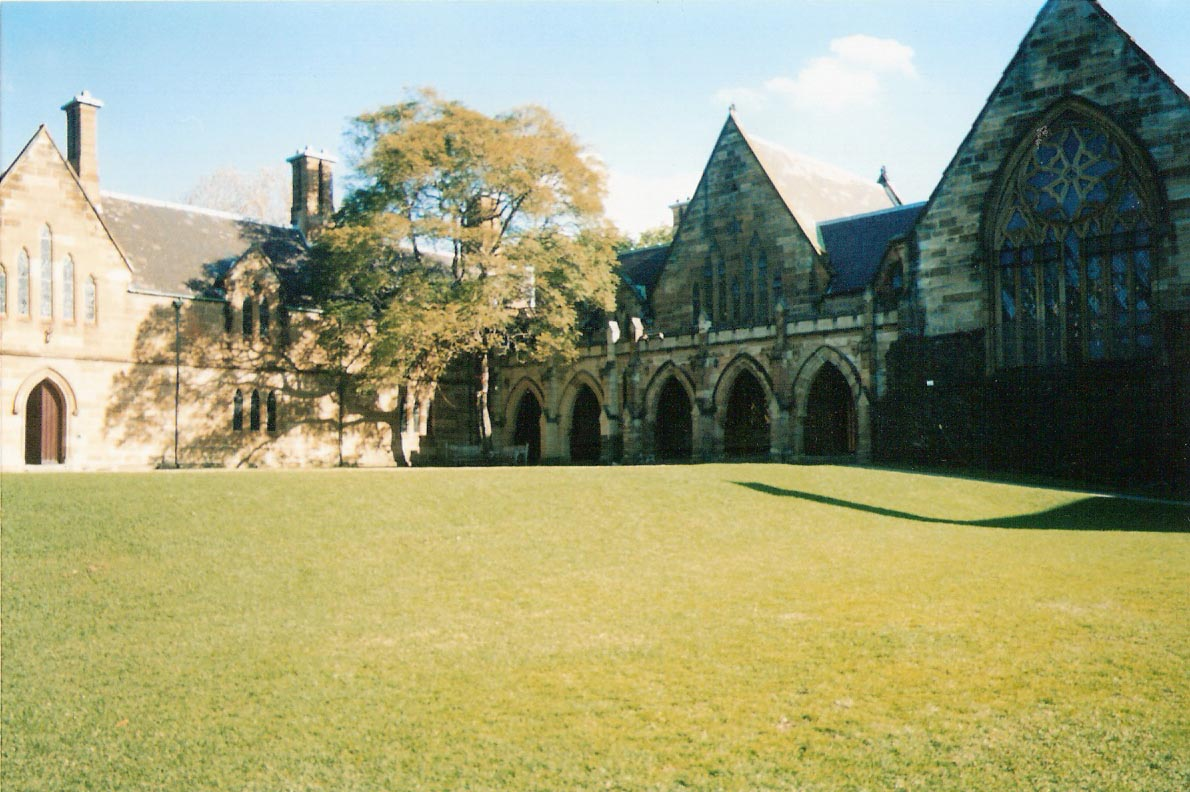
Main courtyard

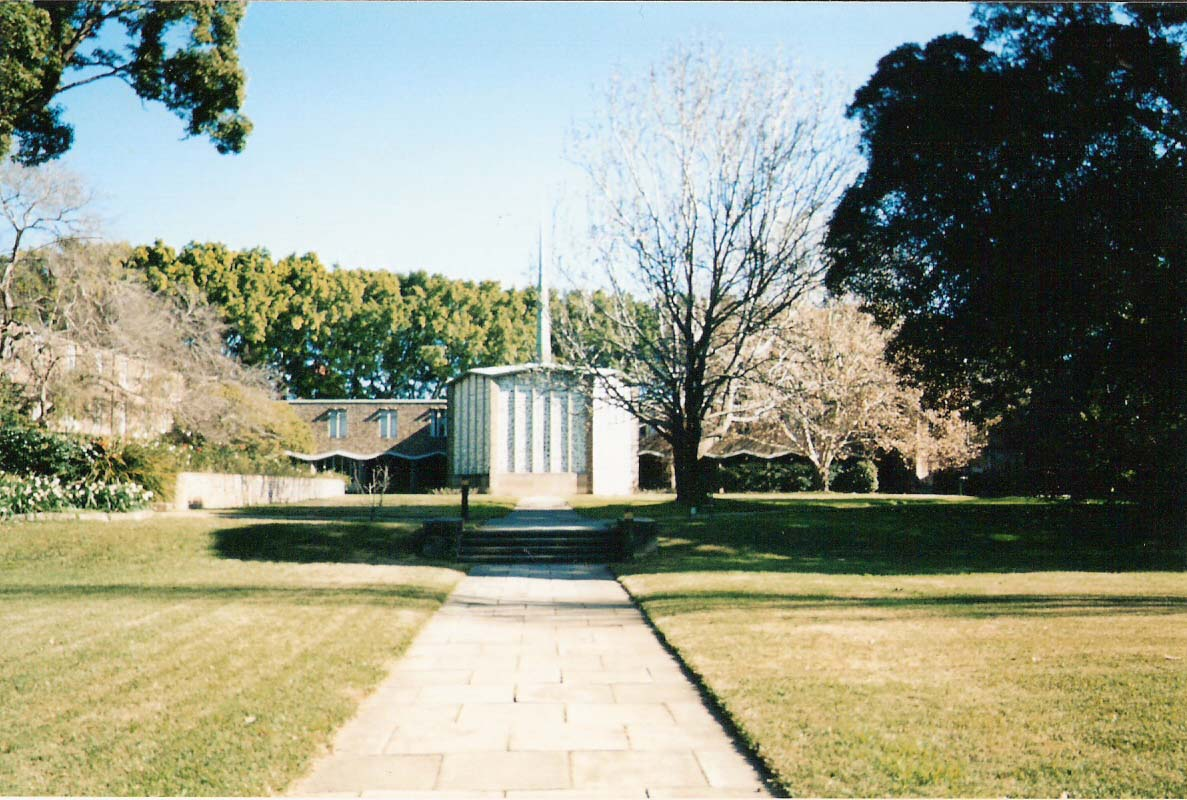
Chapel
