= William Dumaresq =

Australian politician

William John Dumaresq
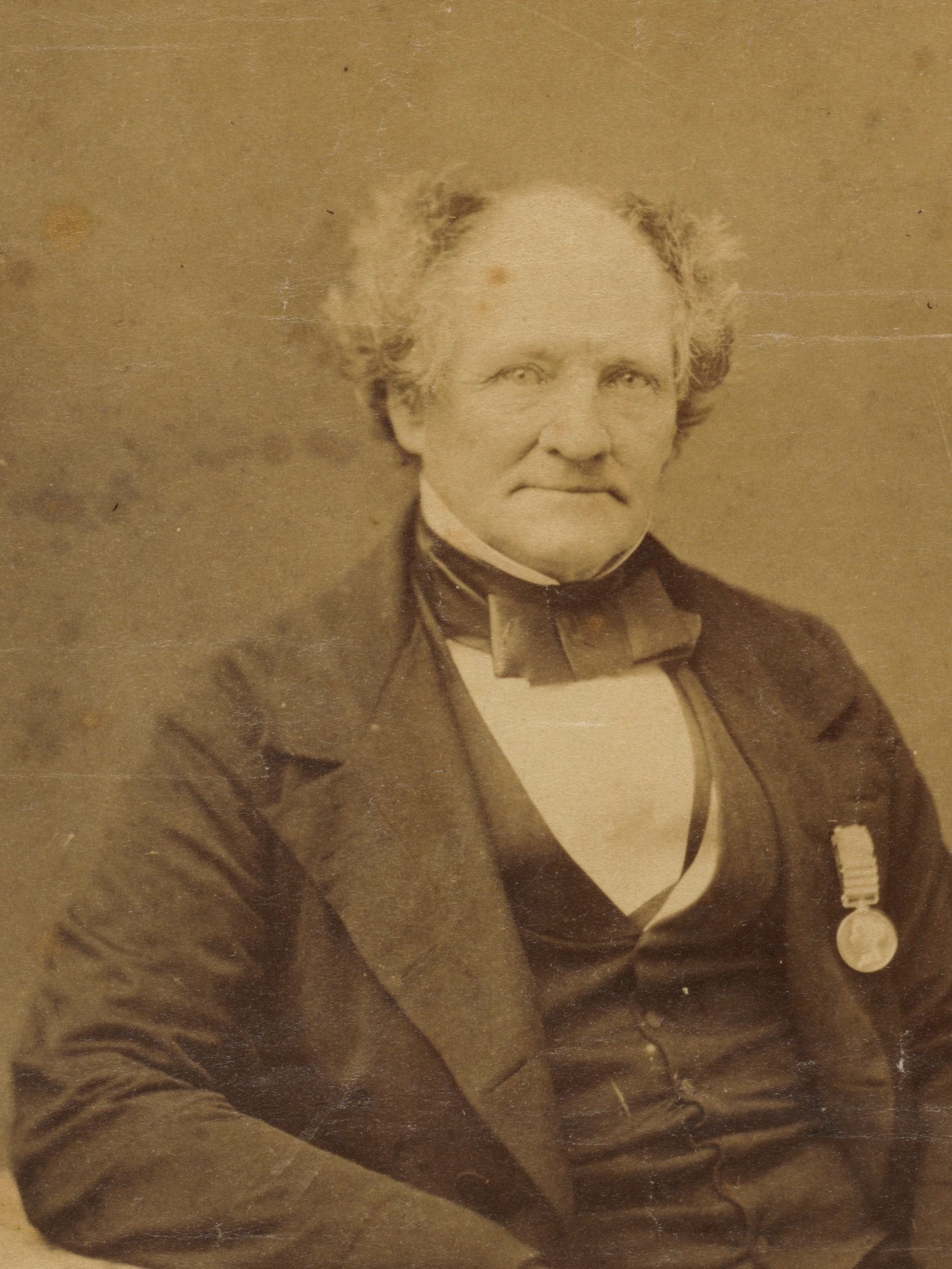
- c. 1858
- Born: 25 February 1793
- Died: 9 November 1868 (aged 75); Cleveland, Queensland
- Occupation: Politician

William John Dumaresq (25 February 1793 – 9 November 1868) was an English-born military officer, civil engineer, landholder and early Australian politician. He is associated with settler colonisation of the areas around Scone and Armidale, in New South Wales.

== Life and career ==
Dumaresq was the son of John Dumaresq, a Shropshire colonel, and Anne Jones. He attended the Royal Military College, Great Marlow, and became a civil engineer. He served in the Royal Staff Corps in the Peninsular War and in Canada. He rose to the rank of Captain. Although some sources say that he worked on the Ottawa canal, that seems unlikely, as the canal was built after Dumaresq arrived in Australia. However, he possibly worked on associated canals in Canada, which began construction earlier, such as the Greville Canal.

In 1815, he and Samuel Augustus Perry were entrusted with the task of removing and returning to Venice the four bronze Horses of St Mark that Napoleon had taken to Paris and installed atop the Arc de Triomphe du Carrousel.

He was a brother-in-law of Ralph Darling. When Darling became Governor of New South Wales, in 1824, Dumaresq and his brothers, Henry and Edward, came with Darling and their sister, Eliza, to Australia. William and his brother Henry were subject to criticism, from local opponents of Darling, who saw the brothers as beneficiaries of nepotism.

Initially, appointed as a civil engineer and as inspector of bridges and roads, he acted for a time as colonial treasurer, after the death of William Balcombe. He was acting Deputy Surveyor-General in New South Wales. His appointment was never confirmed, due to concerns about the many appointments Darling had made of his relatives and close associates.

During his time as a public official, William Dumaresq was the sponsor of a major improvement in Sydney's water supply, Busby's Bore. that was completed after he had left office. He is also credited with the design of the Commissariat Store in Brisbane and a watch house in Sydney (later the Erskine Street Police Station). In 1828, he purchased land owned by the church at Glebe, although he did not live on it.

He retired in 1829, after the death of Surveyor-General John Oxley and his replacement by Thomas Mitchell. It seems that Mitchell was resentful of Governor Darling and any of those who had been favoured by Darling, such as Oxley, Darling's brothers-in-law, Henry Dumaresq and Dumaresq himself, George Bowen (an assistant surveyor under Oxley), and Charles Sturt (who was a cousin of Henry Dumaresq's wife).

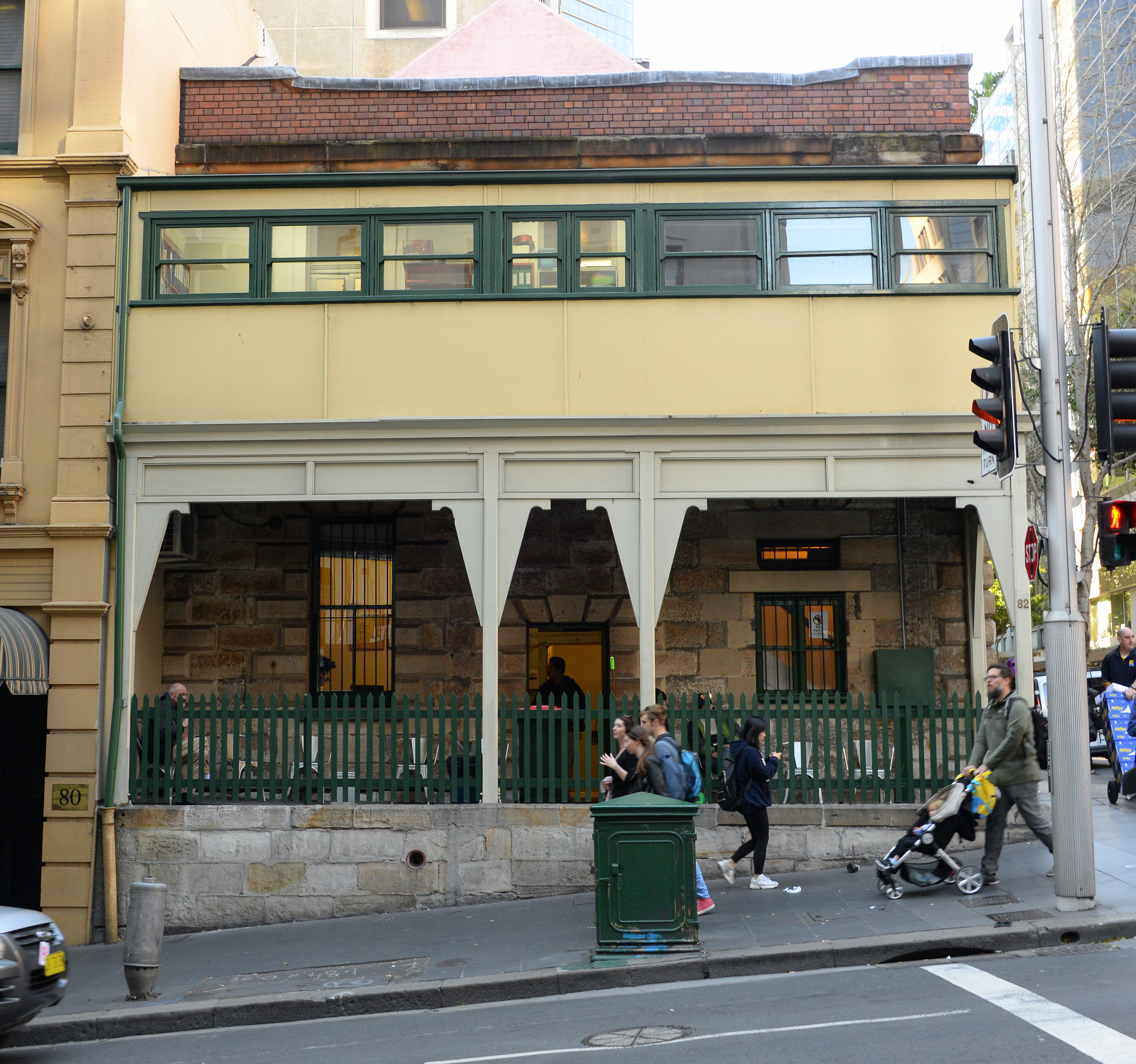
Heritage-listed Watch House in Sydney, designed by Dumaresq

From 1830, Dumaresq was a magistrate of the Hyde Park Barracks Court of General Sessions, with Samuel Augustus Perry (his successor as Deputy Surveyor-General) and James Busby. Convicts were brought to the site for sentencing and punishment by the court, sitting in northern perimeter buildings of the barracks. Punishments handed down included floggings, which were carried out on site, or terms on the treadmill or chain gangs. This role almost certainly ended, around the time that Governor Darling was succeeded by the liberal-minded Richard Bourke, in 1831. Bourke was horrified by the severity and arbitrary application of the punishments to which convicts were being sentenced, and had legislation passed, which codified offences and limited punishments.

On 15 October 1830, he married Christiana Susan Macleay, daughter of the Colonial Secretary, Alexander Macleay; they had three daughters and two sons.

Although he lived mainly at Rose Bay from the 1840s, Dumaresq was associated with the Scone district. He had been granted a landholding there, by Darling, which he named St. Aubins. In the 1830s, he was living in the area, then known as 'the district of Invermein', and was sitting as a Justice-of-the-Peace with two other local landholders. He was a pioneer of horse breeding, in the Scone district, at St Aubins.The Dumaresq brothers, Henry and William, also took, from local Aboriginal people, two vast squatting runs, in the New England district; William's run Tilbuster and Henry's adjoining run Saumarez, which they operated as sheep runs from around 1835.

During the 1840s, Dumeresq subdivided and sold his land, the 'Bossier Estate', at Glebe. It was an early suburban land development in what is now an inner suburb of Sydney. His land ran east-north-east, from modern-day Glebe Point Road, to the foreshores of Rozelle Bay and Blackwattle Bay.

William seems to have emerged from retirement into a more public role, only after the death of his more ambitious and temperamental brother, Henry Dumaresq, in 1838. In addition to his own estate of St Aubins, William became responsible for operating St Hiliers near Muswellbrook (by then his brother's widow's property), and both the New England runs.

Prior to the establishment of responsible government, Dumaresq was elected to the partially elected New South Wales Legislative Council at the first elections held in the colony in 1843. He represented the electorate of Counties of Hunter, Brisbane and Bligh. He was defeated for the seat at the 1848 New South Wales colonial election by Donald McIntyre, but was re-elected in 1851 as the member for Counties of Phillip, Brisbane and Bligh.

He was appointed to the reconstituted Council in 1856, but resigned without taking his seat. After that, his only public roles seem to have been in relation to the church.

== Later life and death ==
After his wife's death in 1866, Dumaresq moved to Queensland, to live with his daughter, Susan Frances Sophia, who was the wife of the sugar industry pioneer and politician, Louis Hope. He died at Cleveland on 9 November 1868 (aged 75). His remains lie in the Camperdown Cemetery, in Sydney, in one of the two vaults bearing the family name Macleay.

== Legacy ==
There is a memorial to him in St. James' Church, Sydney, which has this inscription, "William John Dumaresq Captn. Royal Staff Corps Served in the Peninsula, and Canada, and New South Wales Born xxv February MDCCXCII., died in November MDCCCLXVIII."

William Dumaresq's grandson was Rear-Admiral John Saumarez Dumaresq (1873–1922).

The family name Dumaresq appears in the naming of features in the north of New South Wales and the south of Queensland, including Dumaresq (a locality) and its former railway station, Dumaresq Creek and on it Dumaresq Dam, Dumaresq River, Mount Dumaresq, and the former Dumaresq Shire.

Dumaresq's Sydney home at Rose Bay, Tivoli House, although subsequently extended, still exists as a building of the Kambala School. He is also remembered by Dumaresq Reserve, a foreshore park in Rose Bay, The land that he sold at Glebe is now a significant part of that inner suburb, and the heritage building Bidura is located upon one of the lots.

One of the main streets of Scone is St Aubins Street, named after Dumaresq's estate, which was south of the settlement. Dumaresq's land adjoined the original village on its north and east sides, and also came close to its southern edge. As the town grew it expanded over some of the land formerly owned by William Dumaresq. Horse breeding, which Dumaresq pioneered at Scone, is still an important industry in the surrounding area.

== See also ==
- Members of the New South Wales Legislative Council, 1843–1851, 1851–1856 and 1856–1861
- Results of the 1843, 1848 and 1851 elections
- Eliza Darling (sister)
- Henry Dumaresq (elder brother)
- Edward Dumaresq (younger brother)
- Dumaresq family

New South Wales Legislative Council
New parliament	Member for Counties of Hunter, Brisbane & Bligh; 1843 – 1848	Succeeded by Donald McIntyre
Preceded by Donald McIntyre as Member for Counties of Hunter, Brisbane & Bligh	Member for Counties of Phillip, Brisbane & Bligh; 1851 – 1856	Council replaced by new parliament
New parliament	Appointed member 1856	Succeeded by uncertain
Political offices
Preceded by William Balcombe	Acting Colonial Treasurer; April – July 1829	Succeeded by Campbell Riddell
