= Theatre Organ Society =

Theater Organ Society may refer to one of several organizations:

- American Theatre Organ Society
- Cinema Organ Society
- Theatre Organ Society of Australia
- Theatre Organ Society International
