= List of Fortians =

This is a list of alumni of Fort Street High School, Sydney, New South Wales, Australia who have attained notability in various fields. It includes alumni of the historical Fort Street Boys' High School, Fort Street Girls' High School, Fort Street Superior Public School and Fort Street Model School (or Fort Street National School), from which Fort Street Public School also descends. They are named "Fortians" in the traditions of these schools.

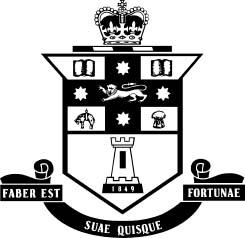
Fort Street Crest

== Politics, government and the law ==
- Edwin Abbott CBE (1878–1947), Controller-General of the Department of Trade and Customs 1933 to 1944
- Sir William Anderson, businessman, federal president (1955–1956) and federal treasurer (1956–1968) of the Liberal Party of Australia
- Edmund Barton, the first Prime Minister of Australia and a founding Justice of the High Court of Australia; (attended Fort Street for two years; later Sydney Grammar School)
- Sir Garfield Barwick, former chief justice of the High Court of Australia
- Eric Bedford, minister and member of the NSW Legislative Assembly (1968–1985)
- Charles Bennett, member of the NSW Legislative Assembly (1934–1941)
- Ivan Black, member of the NSW Legislative Assembly (1945–1962)
- Rod Blackmore, OAM, Senior Magistrate at the Children's Court of New South Wales, serving from 1978 to 1995.
- Vicki Bourne, Senator (1990–2002)
- Arthur Bridges, Leader of the Government in the NSW Legislative Council, minister and member (1946–1968);
- Joseph Browne, member of the NSW Legislative Council (1912–1932)
- John Bryson QC, former justice of the Supreme Court of New South Wales
- Sir Joseph Carruthers, former premier of New South Wales
- Rodney Cavalier, minister and member of the NSW Legislative Assembly (1978–1988), currently chairman of the SCG Trust
- Ian Cohen, member of the NSW Legislative Council (1995–2011)
- Terence Cole, QC, jurist, twice Royal Commissioner (AWB Oil-for-Food and Building Industry)
- Hugh Connell, DSO MC and Bar, member of the NSW Legislative Assembly (1920–1934)
- Peter Crawford, member of the NSW Legislative Assembly (1984–1988)
- William Dick, member of the NSW Legislative Assembly (1894–1907) and NSW Legislative Council (1907–1932)
- Ben Doig, member of the NSW Legislative Assembly (1957–1965)
- John Dowd, former NSW Attorney-General, Leader of the Opposition and Justice of the Supreme Court of New South Wales, and former chancellor of Southern Cross University;
- Syd Einfeld, Deputy Leader of the Opposition, minister and member of the NSW Legislative Assembly (1965–1981)
- Bob Ellicott, QC, former federal minister, solicitor-general, attorney-general and judge of the Federal Court
- Sir Kevin Ellis, Speaker of the NSW Legislative Assembly and Member (1948–1973)
- Dr H. V. Evatt, former High Court judge, former Chief Justice of the Supreme Court of New South Wales, president of the United Nations General Assembly and federal ALP opposition leader
- Clive Evatt, minister and member of the NSW Legislative Assembly (1939–1959), brother of H. V. Evatt
- Doug Everingham, federal Minister for Health, 1972–1975
- David Fell, member of the NSW Legislative Assembly (1904–1913)
- Sir David Ferguson, former justice of the Supreme Court of NSW
- JD (Jack) Fitzgerald, member of the NSW Legislative Assembly (1891–1894) and NSW Legislative Council (1915–1922)
- Harry Gardiner, member of the NSW Legislative Council (1960–1974)
- Don Grimes, former senator, federal minister, and member of the Administrative Appeals Tribunal
- Arthur Grimm, member of the NSW Legislative Assembly (1913–1925)
- Graham Hill, former judge of the Federal Court of Australia
- Thomas Holden, member of the NSW Legislative Council (1934–1945)
- Justice Michael Kirby, former justice of the High Court of Australia
- Justice David Kirby, former justice of the Supreme Court of New South Wales
- Joseph Kelly, member of the NSW Legislative Assembly (1894–1898)
- Sir John Kerr, 18th Governor-General of Australia, responsible for the dismissal of the Whitlam government in 1975, former Chief Justice of the Supreme Court of New South Wales
- Hugh Latimer, member of the NSW Legislative Council (1934–1954)
- Stan Lloyd, member of the NSW Legislative Assembly(1932–1941)
- Harold Mason, member of the NSW Legislative Assembly (1937–1938)
- Gustave 'Gus' Miller, member of the NSW Legislative Assembly (1889–1918)
- Trevor Morling, QC, former judge of the Federal Court, Royal Commissioner and chairman of the Australian Electoral Commission
- William Murray, member of the NSW Legislative Council (1952–1976)
- Lerryn Mutton, member of the NSW Legislative Assembly (1968–1978)
- Shane Paltridge, politician; senator 1951–1966
- Alfred Parker, Lord Mayor of Sydney (1934–1935)
- John Perry, minister and member of the NSW Legislative Assembly (1889–1920)
- Ivan Petch, member of the NSW Legislative Assembly (1988–1995)
- Dr Peter Phelps, member of the NSW Legislative Council (2011–2019)
- Max Ruddock, minister and member of the NSW Legislative Assembly (1962–1976) and father of Philip Ruddock;
- James Shand, minister and member of the NSW Legislative Assembly (1926–1944)
- Simon Sheikh, former executive director of GetUp!, a national non-party political organisation
- William Shipway, member of the NSW Legislative Assembly (1894–1895)
- Ross Smith, Victorian MLA (1985–2002)
- Harold Snelling, former NSW solicitor-general
- Sir Percy Spender, former president of the International Court of Justice, Federal Minister, diplomat and jurist
- Sir Bertram Stevens, former premier of New South Wales
- Stanley Stephens, minister and member of the NSW Legislative Assembly (1944–1973)
- Sir Alan Taylor, former justice of the High Court of Australia
- Sir Frederick Tout, pastoralist and member of the NSW Legislative Council (1932–1946) and Newington College (1886–1890) where he was Captain of Rugby Union.
- Allan Viney, member of the NSW Legislative Assembly (1971–1978)
- Horace Whiddon, member of the NSW Legislative Council (1934–1955)
- Sir Robert Wilson, member of the NSW Legislative Council (1949–1961)
- Neville Wran, former premier of New South Wales

== Science and academia ==
- Joyce Allan, conchologist, artist and first female Fellow of the Royal Zoological Society of New South Wales
- Sir Hermann Black, former chancellor of the University of Sydney
- Carl Bridge, Professor Emeritus of Australian History, King’s College London
- Frederick Bridges, educationalist and former chief inspector of schools in New South Wales
- Ida Brown, palaentonologist, first female president of the Royal Society of New South Wales
- Hedley Bull, professor of international relations at ANU, LSE and Oxford University, and author of "The Anarchical Society"
- Persia Campbell, Australian-born American economist and consumer rights champion
- John Henry Carver, physicist
- Alan Rowland Chisholm, professor of French at University of Melbourne, critic and commentator
- Sir Archibald Collins, former president of the British Medical Association of Australia,
- Dr Alex J Crandon, Oncology Surgeon & former Professor Gynaecological Cancer University of Queensland (1993–2004)
- Dr Robert Douglas, doctor and medical scientist
- Dr William Figgett, biomedical scientist at the University of Melbourne
- Theodore Thomson Flynn, professor of marine biology and zoology at the University of Tasmania and Queen's University of Belfast, served as the Chair of Zoology, first biology professor in Tasmania, director of the marine station at Portaferry, father of actor Errol Flynn
- Lionel Gilbert OAM, author and historian specializing in natural, applied, and local history.
- Norman Haire, medical practitioner and sexologist
- Margaret Ann Harris, Challis Professor of English Literature at The University of Sydney
- Stephen Hetherington, philosopher, Emeritus Professor in the School of Humanities and Languages at the University of New South Wales.
- Ronald Horan, educator, linguist and author
- John Irvine Hunter, biologist
- Prof Nalini Joshi, chair, National Committee for Mathematical Sciences, School of Mathematics and Statistics, The University of Sydney
- Phyllis Kaberry, social anthropologist
- Liang Joo Leow OAM, physician, Mohs surgeon, linguist; first dermatologist appointed to the Therapeutic Goods Administration
- Sylvia Lawson, academic, writer and journalist
- Sir Douglas Mawson, Antarctic explorer
- R. Kerry Rowe, FRS, civil engineer. Professor, Kingston University, Ontario
- Maria Skyllas-Kazacos AM, director of the University of New South Wales, Centre for Electrochemical and Mineral Processing
- Mavis Sweeney (1909 — 23 July 1986), Australian hospital pharmacist
- Arthur Bache Walkom, palaeobotanist and museum director
- Prof John Manning Ward, former vice-chancellor at The University of Sydney
- Enid Phyllis Wilson, (1908-1988) industrial psychologist,
- Sir Harold Wyndham, former NSW Director-General of Education, creator of the Wyndham Scheme (HSC)
- Dr John Yu, Australian of the Year, 1996; former chancellor of UNSW
- Dr Jee Hyun Kim, senior research fellow and head of the Developmental Psychobiology Laboratory at the Florey Institute of Neuroscience and Mental Health in Melbourne

== Rhodes Scholars ==
- Kate Brennan – BA LLB, University of Sydney, 2006 (also attended Tara Anglican School for Girls and MLC School)
- Robert Nicholson McCulloch – BSc (Agric), University of Sydney, 1926

== Military ==
- Maj Basil Catterns, soldier, businessman and yachtsman
- Maj-Gen Bill Crews, former national president of the Returned and Services League of Australia
- Flt Lt Pat Hughes, RAAF pilot. One of The Few, Hughes was the highest-scoring Australian in the Battle of Britain
- Sqdn Ldr Guy Menzies, first solo flight over the Tasman Sea
- Arthur George Weaver DFC, bomber pilot, lawyer and father of Jacki Weaver
- Maj-Gen George Wootten, soldier, lawyer, and political activist
- Maj-Gen Zeng Sheng (Tsang Sang), Chinese guerilla force commander in Hong Kong during World War II, later Rear Admiral in the People's Liberation Army Navy, Minister of Transport and Mayor of Guangzhou (1960–1967) and Deputy Governor of Guangdong Province, attended Fort Street for five years, later attended Sun Yat-sen University High School.

== Business and industry ==
- Frank Albert, founder of Albert Music and the board of the Australian Broadcasting Company
- Hughie Armitage, former governor of the Commonwealth Bank
- Samuel Hordern, merchant and philanthropist
- Sir Ronald Irish, businessman and author;
- Raymond McGrath, architect, pioneer of Modernism, former president of the Royal Hibernian Academy
- Gary Pemberton, businessman
- Abe Saffron, underworld figure, nightclub owner and property developer
- John Singleton, broadcaster; advertising tycoon
- Ken Thomas, founder of Thomas Nationwide Transport, international transport company.

== Religion and community ==
- Ellis Gowing former Archdeacon of Southend, United Kingdom
- Stephen Duckett, secretary of Commonwealth Department of Health (1994–1996), chair, board of directors, Brotherhood of St Laurence (2000–2005), president and chief executive officer, Alberta Health Services (2009–2010), Health Program Director, Grattan Institute (2012–)
- Tony Thirlwell OAM, chief executive, Heart Foundation (NSW)
- Sir Alan Walker, former superintendent minister of the Wesley Central Mission, Central Methodist Mission Sydney
- James Graham Somerville, environmentalist

== Entertainment, media and the arts ==
- Neville Amadio, flautist
- John Appleton, stage and radio actor writer and producer
- Helmut Bakaitis, actor
- George Lewis Becke, writer
- Bill Boustead, conservator at the Art Gallery of New South Wales from 1954 until 1977.
- Barbara Brunton actress
- Christian Byers, actor
- Anna Choy, television presenter
- Kenneth Cook, writer
- David Foster, novelist, essayist, poet and farmer (also attended Orange High School and Armidale High School)
- Nikki Gooley, make-up artist, BAFTA winner (2005), Saturn Award winner (1999), Oscar nominee (2006)
- Norman Hetherington, creator of "Mr. Squiggle"
- Frank Hodgkinson AM, Australian printmaker, painter and graphic artist
- A. D. Hope, poet
- Muriel Howlett, first female journalist for the BBC
- Lindy Hume, opera and festival director
- Deborah Hutton, Model & TV Personality
- Dr Francis James, journalist and publisher
- Sir Errol Knox, journalist, publisher, citizen soldier who served in both world wars rising to the rank of brigadier
- Mary Kostakidis, SBS newsreader and a member of founding management team
- James McAuley, poet and co-creator of Ern Malley
- Cassie McCullagh, ABC presenter, journalist and writer
- Donald McDonald, former chairman of the Australian Broadcasting Corporation
- Adit Gauchan, producer for Australian hip hop band Horrorshow
- Nick Bryant-Smith (MC Solo), rapper for Australian hip hop band Horrorshow
- Nick Lupi, rapper for hip hop group Spit Syndicate
- Tai Nguyen, actor
- Kaho Cheung (aka Unkle Ho), producer for Australian hip hop band The Herd
- Lucia Osborne-Crowley, author of 'I Choose Elena' and journalist
- Michael Pate, Australian actor and writer
- Robie Porter, (aka Rob E G), Australian musician and music producer
- Margaret Preston, artist and teacher of art
- Josh Pyke, singer/songwriting musician
- Eric Charles Rolls AM, Writer; Recipient of the Centenary Medal 2003
- Dennis Shanahan, political editor, The Australian
- Joy Smithers, actress and public speaker
- Harold Stewart, poet and co-creator of Ern Malley
- John West, ABC radio's "The Showman"
- Amy Witting, poet and novelist
- Rowan Woods, AFI winning film director
- Josh Szeps, political satirist and TV show host
- Jake Stone, singer of Indie rock band Bluejuice, along with others in the band

== Sport ==
- Marilyn Black, athlete, 1964 Summer Olympics
- Judy Canty, athlete, 1948 Olympic Games, 1950 British Empire Games
- Jean Coleman, athlete, 1938 Empire Games
- Robert Graves, dual Rugby international
- Harold Hardwick, swimmer, 1911 Empire Games; 1912 Olympic Games
- Jon Henricks, swimmer, 1954 British Empire and Commonwealth Games; 1956, 1960 Olympic Games
- Harry Hopman, tennis player
- Clarice Kennedy, athlete, 1938 Empire Games
- Garry Leo, Rugby League, 1963–74, Balmain Tigers First Grade
- Adrian Lowe, athlete, 1988 Paralympic Games.
- Charles Macartney, cricketer
- Betty McKinnon, athlete, 1948 Olympic Games
- Paul Magee, athlete, 1938 Empire Games
- June Maston, athlete, 1948 Olympic Games
- Marlene Matthews, athlete, 1954, 1958 British Empire and Commonwealth Games; 1956, 1960 Olympic Games; later director of the Western Sydney Academy of Sport
- Wayne Miranda, Rugby League, 1979–83, Balmain Rugby League First Grade
- Ian Moutray, Rugby Union international
- Margaret Parker, athlete, 1966 British Empire and Commonwealth Games
- Myer Rosenblum, athlete, 1938 British empire and Commonwealth Games; and Rugby Union international
- Frederick (Frank) Row, Australia's first Rugby Union captain (vs British Lions, 1899)
- Fred Spofforth, cricketer
- Jan Stephenson, golfer
- Liz Weekes, water polo, 2000 Olympic Games
- Taryn Woods, water polo, 2000 Olympic Games
