= Capri Theatre =

Heritage-listed cinema in Goodwood, Adelaide, South Australia

- Capri Theatre in 2026
- Former names: New Goodwood Star Theatre (1941–1964); New Cinema Curzon (1964–1967); Cinema Capri (1967–1978)

General information
- Type: Cinema
- Architectural style: Art Deco and Streamline Moderne
- Location: 141 Goodwood Road, Goodwood, South Australia, Australia
- Coordinates: 34°57′10″S 138°35′24″E
- Completed: 1941
- Opened: 8 October 1941
- Client: D. Clifford Amusements
- Owner: Theatre Organ Society of Australia

Design and construction
- Architect: Christopher Smith
- Other designers: B. A. Gordon
- Main contractor: R. J. Nurse

Website
- capri.org.au

South Australian Heritage Register
- Official name: Capri Theatre (former New Goodwood Star Theatre)
- Designated: 27 September 1990
- Reference no.: 10670

The Capri Theatre is a heritage-listed cinema in Goodwood, a suburb of Adelaide, South Australia, built in the Art Deco style in 1941. It was formerly called the New Star Theatre, Goodwood Star, New Curzon, and Cinema Capri.

It is owned by and is home to the Theatre Organ Society of Australia (SA Division). A notable feature of the cinema is the Wurlitzer theatre organ, which is used regularly for recitals, as well as an entertainment feature supporting the screening of films.

== History ==
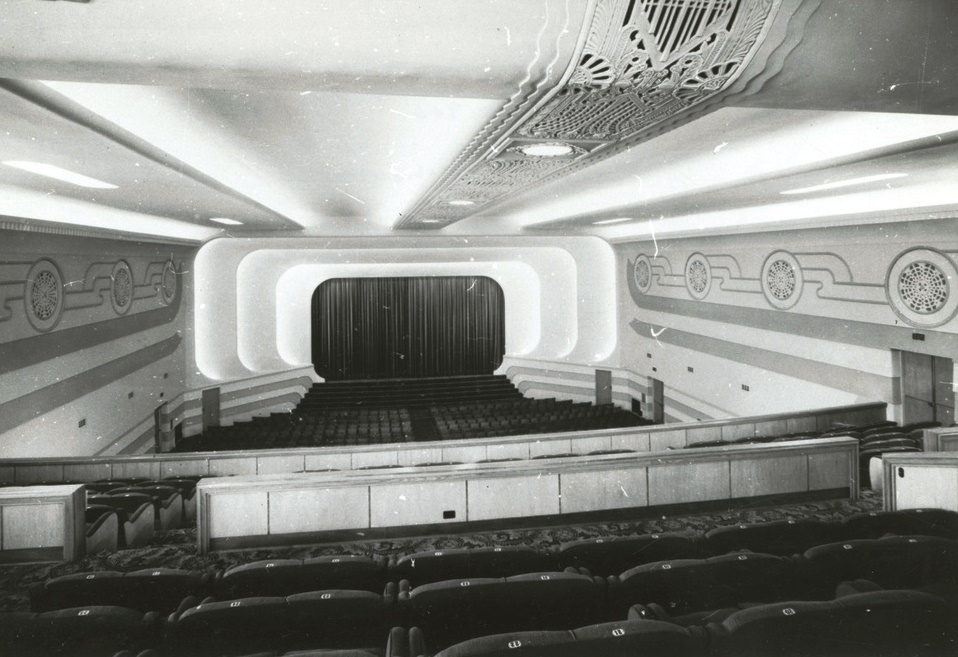
Star Theatre, Goodwood, interior, 1941

=== Earlier Curzon ===
The building housing the Goodwood Wondergraph, which opened on 3 November 1911, still stands two doors down from the present Capri, used as offices and a warehouse. It was acquired by the Clifford Theatre Circuit in September 1920, along with Wondergraph's other suburban cinemas, renamed Star Theatre until late 1942. After the October 1941 opening of the New Star Theatre, the old Star was sold to Ozone Theatres and renamed Ozone Theatre. It was renamed the Curzon in 1955 and was leased until its closure on 20 February 1964.

=== New Star ===
Theatre entrepreneur Dan Clifford had built several other cinemas in Adelaide, including the Piccadilly Theatre in North Adelaide in 1940, and he was responsible for the building of this new picture theatre. The cinema was designed by renowned Art Deco architect Christopher Arthur Smith. It was built by R.J. Nurse of Norwood, and the interior decoration was by a Mrs B.A. Gordon. The original plans show the name "Savoy", but it was initially named the Goodwood Star.

The cinema opened on 8 October 1941 as the New Star Theatre. It was part of the Clifford Theatre Circuit (D. Clifford Theatres Ltd.) and had a seating capacity of 1,472 persons. The films shown on opening night were Robert Young in Florian and Lew Ayres in Dr. Kildare Goes Home.

Greater Union acquired the cinema 1947, as part of their acquisition of the Clifford Circuit.

The cinema was renamed as the New Curzon on 21 February 1964, after the old Curzon nearby closed. It was again renamed as the Cinema Capri on 16 November 1967, when Greater Union took out most of the Art Deco interior decorative features and reduced the seating capacity to 851.

The Theatre Organ Society of Australia (South Australian Division) Inc. purchased the cinema in 1978, and they relaunched the cinema as the Capri Theatre. Many of the interior features have been retained and restored since then, with an appeal launched by the National Trust of Australia to repaint the exterior for the theatre's 75th anniversary in 2016.

=== Installation of the "Mighty Wurlitzer" ===
The Theatre Organ Society (TOSA) installed a Wurlitzer theatre organ, after altering the proscenium arch to allow for it, with the pipe work in glass fronted chambers along each side of the screen. The inaugural concert took place on 2 April 1983.

The original organ was built in the United States in 1923, and extra pipes had been added to it from around the country and overseas, during its lifetime in theatres in Melbourne, Brisbane, and Sydney. It was carried in a double-decker bus to Darwin in the 1960s, by a man who wanted it to keep it in his home. However, for climatic and other reasons, he never got it to work properly, and in 1974 it was moved (this time in a truck) to Adelaide by TOSA, not long before Cyclone Tracy devastated the house it had been kept in.

The organ to some years to be reassembled, and it was only on Easter Saturday in 1983, that the opening celebration took place, which included international theatre organists who flew in especially for the event. As originally installed, the organ had four keyboards and 13 sets of pipes (ranks). These were added to, until as of 2020 it has 29 ranks, making it the second largest in the Southern Hemisphere. The pipework has been progressively installed in glass-fronted chambers, unique in a theatre or cinema.

The organ's 40th anniversary at the Capri is celebrated on the Easter weekend (7–10 April) in 2023.

== Heritage listing ==
On 27 September 1990, the cinema was placed on the South Australian Heritage Register.

=== Authentic Art Deco restoration ===
While the cinema has modern presentation features, its appearance has been carefully restored to its 1941 Art Deco design, including:

- Exterior and interior decoration restored to original 1941 colours and styles
- Original 1941 design carpeting
- Replica 1941 Art Deco fireplace, mirror & wooden Venetians in the upstairs foyer
- Club Lounges and replica 1941 round column seating in both foyers

== Features, operation and programming ==
The cinema is a single-screen cinema, with 750 seats on two levels. It is available for hire, specialising in fund-raising events, and is used as a venue for Adelaide Fringe events.

The cinema had a new digital projection system installed in 2012, with the assistance of the South Australian Government and Unley Council. Upstairs, it features lounge seats, including double "love seats".

The cinema is run as a not-for-profit organisation, run mostly by volunteers and with all profits spent on the upkeep of the building and its famous organ.

The cinema operates mainstream cinema programming. Several times a year, it presents "Nostalgia Movie Nights", when popular classic films are shown, in a programme with supporting short films, a newsreel and nostalgic advertising. Another regular event is the "Cult at the Capri", when two films are shown.

The Wurlitzer is played before sessions on Tuesday, Friday and Saturday evenings, and is also used for regular organ concerts featuring local and international organists.

== Exhibition ==
The cinema was featured in a photographic exhibition called Now Showing... Cinema Architecture in South Australia, held at the Hawke Centre's Kerry Packer Civic Gallery in April/May 2024.

== See also ==
- Rod Blackmore Author of Australasian Theatre Organs
