= Avenue Theatre (San Francisco) =

Former movie theater in California, United States

Coordinates: 37.728181°N 122.403962°W

The Avenue Theatre was a movie theater in San Francisco that operated from 1927 until 1984.

== History ==
The theater opened on July 20, 1927, built and operated by four Levin brothers who owned other theaters in the area. It was located in the Portola neighborhood. The theater ran promotions wherein patrons could collect dinnerware, one piece at a time, on a weekly basis. Management changed in the mid-1960s, when the Lyric Photoplay Film Society, under Edward Millington Stout III, took over. In 1966 the Society installed a Wurlitzer theater organ of 3 manuals and 16 ranks, which had originally been the organ at the State Lake Theater in Chicago. The first show utilizing the "new" organ took place on October 7, 1966, screening The Lost World and featuring Tom Hazelton on the console. The theater then began showing an eclectic assortment of films, including foreign films, re-runs of three-dimensional films and silent films (for which the organ was utilized).

Lyn Larsen was staff organist for the next two years, 1967 through 1968. Bob Vaughn began as organist in 1968, and remained the organist at the Avenue until it closed. The American Theatre Organ Society featured this organ in its 1975 and 1983 national conventions. The theater developed a loyal following, but crime from the surrounding area eventually kept patrons away. The theater closed on December 22, 1984, amid financial difficulties. Before the organ was placed in storage, an album by Jim Riggs entitled Top Hat was recorded on it.
