= Capri Cinema =

Capri Cinema could refer to:

- Capri Theatre, in the suburb of Goodwood in Adelaide, South Australia (formerly Cinema Capri)
- Capri Cinema (Chicago), in Chicago, now defunct.
