= Rod Blackmore =

Former New South Wales magistrate

Rod Blackmore OAM
- Born: Rodney David Blackmore; 1935
- Education: Fort Street Boys' High
- Occupation: Magistrate
- Spouse: Beth Blackmore
- Children: Leigh, Kent and Melinda Blackmore
- Parent(s): Cecil Hargreaves Blackmore; Lydia Mabel Norris
- Relatives: Hugh Moffit Blackmore (paternal grandfather)

Rodney ("Rod") David Blackmore OAM (born 7 August 1935), is a former senior magistrate in the Australian state of New South Wales. He is perhaps best known for his work with children and adolescents. Blackmore's last judicial posting was as the Senior Magistrate at the Children's Court of New South Wales, serving from 1978 to 1995.

== Biography ==
=== Youth and early legal career ===
Blackmore was born in Deniliquin where his father Cecil was clerk of the court at the time of Rodney's birth. His parents deliberately named him "Rodney David" to achieve identification (via his initials) with the author of Lorna Doone. He came from a legal family; both his father, Cecil Hargreaves Blackmore, and paternal grandfather, Hugh Moffitt Blackmore, had served as New South Wales magistrates (Cecil was a Stipendiary Magistrate 1946–1960). Rodney's mother was Lydia Mabel Norris. Cecil Blackmore was appointed as clerk of the court in Grafton from 1937 to 1943, after which the family moved to Haberfield in Sydney.

After being educated at Grafton, New South Wales Public School (1940) and Haberfield Demonstration School, Rodney Blackmore was selected to attend Summer Hill School Summer Hill in opportunity class and then at Fort Street Boys' High (1947-1951) (see List of Fortians). On 12 April 1958, Blackmore married Elizabeth Anne James at Summer Hill Methodist Church, Sydney, where they had met due to Blackmore's playing organ for a number of local Sydney churches. Their children Leigh Blackmore, Kent and Melinda were born respectively in 1959, 1960 and 1962.

Rodney Blackmore gained a Diploma in Law through the Solicitors Admission Board in 1967 and worked in courts administration from 1951. He was Clerk of Petty Sessions in Camden, Clerk of Petty Sessions and Coroner in Armidale, instructing officer at Central Criminal Court, Clerk of Petty Sessions and chamber magistrate at Campsie, Clerk of Petty Sessions and assistant chamber magistrate at the Central Court of Petty Sessions in Darlinghurst Sydney and then chamber magistrate in Sydney.

=== Magisterial career ===
He was commissioned as a Stipendiary Magistrate in 1970. Blackmore was the Parramatta coroner in 1971 and then the traffic magistrate in Kogarah in 1971–72.

From 1972 to 1977 Blackmore and his family lived in Newcastle while he served for five years as the circuit magistrate for the Hunter Region, based in Maitland.

In 1977 he became Special Magistrate at the Metropolitan Children's Court at Albion Street, Sydney, also known as (Albion Street, Surry Hills) Children's Court.The office of Senior Special Magistrate was created and Senior Children's Magistrate Blackmore (as he later was known) took up that position on 8 August 1978. Metropolitan Children's Court at Albion Street closed in 1983 after Bidura Children's Court opened in Glebe. The court still operates today. However, due to frequent escapes from the Bidura Remand and Assessment Centre, it is now used only to hold juveniles appearing in court that day.

Blackmore was a founding member of the Homeless Children's Association in 1980 and its president from 1984 to 1991.

In 1988, Blackmore became the first Senior Children's Court Magistrate of NSW, a position he filled with distinction until his 1995 retirement thirteen years later. In 1989 he wrote the only standard text on the Children's Court in NSW and on the Children and Young Persons (Care and Protection) Act 1998. He later performed his duties at Bidura Children's Court in Glebe. He was featured presiding on the bench at Bidura in the Film Australia documentary Kids in Trouble directed by Sue Cornwell.

In 1995 he became Chairman of the Trustees for the Mangrove Mountain, New South Wales Homeless Persons' Reserve Trust (formerly the Homeless Children's Association); this trust was for some time managed by Wesley Mission in conjunction with its Mangrove Mountain retreat for disadvantaged children. An accommodation lodge at the trust's property near Gosford site was named 'Blackmore Lodge' in his honour.

=== Awards ===
Blackmore was awarded the Order of Australia Medal in 1997 for his service to the welfare of children through the judicial system and to the community.

== Personal life ==
He is the longest continuous member of the Theatre Organ Society of Australia (TOSA), having joined its NSW Division in March 1960 (within 2 months of the society's inauguration). He edited its journal The Diaphone from 1963 until its cessation in 1969.

He is also a Life Member, former President and Activities Director of the Probus Club of Hornsby, New South Wales. He lives with his wife Beth in Sydney.

== Selected bibliography ==
=== Issues impacting children and the legal system ===
- Blackmore, R. D.; Kedwell, W. L.; Lucas, Fr Brian (May 1981). "Advocacy in children's courts". College of Law Centre for Legal Information and Publications. 84 (7). Sydney: College of Law.
- — (1982). Education, courts and delinquency. Delinquency Prevention through affective [i.e. effective] education. Canberra: Australian Institute of Criminology.
- — (1989). The Children's Court and Community Welfare in NSW. Melbourne, Victoria: Longman Cheshire.
- — (1993). "Influences in reform of juvenile courts". In Gale, Fay; Naffine, Ngaire; Wundersitz, Joy (eds.). Juvenile Justice: debating the Issues. St Leonards, NSW: Allen and Unwin.
- — (1995). Finding History in 200 Years of Child Care. Sydney: Hornsby Shire Historical Society.
- — (1997). "Is the Adversary system in the True Interests of Children?". In Young, Anthony (ed.). The Advocate's Notebook. St Leonards, Sydney: Prospect Publishing.
- — (1998). "State Intervention with Children – Two Centuries of History". Australian Journal of Forensic Sciences. 30 (1): 5–17. doi:10.1080/00450619809411380.

=== Theatre organ matters ===
Blackmore was editor of The Diaphone, journal of the Theatre Organ Society of Australia, from 1963 until it ceased publication with volume 7, number 4, in November 1969 OCLC 33883425

- Blackmore, Rod (January 1963). "The State Theatre, Sydney". The Diaphone: 3–4.
- — (May 2008). "The Warragul Opening". TOSA News. "re the opening of the Wurlitzer Theatre organ at the Wesley Centre, Warragul, Victoria, Australia"
- — (April 2011). "Noted Sydney Theatre Had Unique Theatre Organ". TOSA News. "On the theatre organ of the Crystal Palace Theatre, Sydney"
- — (2011). A History of Theatre Pipe Organs in Australia and New Zealand. Thornleigh, New South Wales: self published.
- — (Winter 2015). "Wesley Organs". Sydney Organ Journal. 46 (3): 33–37.
- — (Winter 2016). "Photoplayers". Sydney Organ Journal. 47 (3): 36–37.
- — (Summer 2016–17). "Secular Organs in N.S.W.". Sydney Organ Journal. 48 (1): 47–48.
- — (Summer 2017–18). "The Thing at Drummoyne". Sydney Organ Journal. 49 (1): 24.. On the theatre organ at the Astra Theatre, Drummoyne, Sydney.
- — (Spring 2019). "Remembering David Parsons OAM". Sydney Organ Journal. 50 (4): 27–28.
- — (Autumn 2020). "Heritage Wurlitzer Re-invigorated". Sydney Organ Journal. 51 (2): 20.
- — (Autumn 2020). "New Zealand Christie Organ Unearthed in NSW Project". Sydney Organ Journal. 51 (2): 33–34.
- — (October 2020). "Saving the Regent Sydney's Wurlitzer". VOX: Newsletter of the Theatre Organ Society of Australia (Victorian Division). 61 (9): 3–4.
