= Electoral district of Counties of Hunter, Brisbane and Bligh =

Former legislative council electoral district of New South Wales, Australia

Counties of Hunter, Brisbane and Bligh New South Wales—Legislative Council
- State: New South Wales
- Created: 1843
- Abolished: 1851
- Namesake: Hunter County, Brisbane County, Bligh County
- Coordinates: 32°02′54″S 150°50′04″E

The Electoral district of Counties of Hunter, Brisbane and Bligh and from 1851, Phillip, Brisbane and Bligh, was an electorate of the partially elected New South Wales Legislative Council, created for the first elections for the Council in 1843. The electoral district included the north western counties of Hunter, Brisbane, Bligh. Polling took place in the towns of Jerrys Plains, nearby Merton, Muswellbrook, Scone, as far north as Murrurundi, Watson's on the Macdonald River, Cassilis and as far west as Montefiores. With the expansion of the Council in 1851 Phillip, the other north west county, was added to the district, replacing Hunter which was combined with the lower Hunter county of Northumberland as Counties of Northumberland and Hunter.

In 1856 the unicameral Legislative Council was abolished and replaced with an elected Legislative Assembly and an appointed Legislative Council. The district was represented by the Legislative Assembly Phillip, Brisbane and Bligh.

== Members ==
Member	Term
Hunter, Brisbane and Bligh (1843–1851)
William Dumaresq	Jun 1843 – Jun 1848
Donald McIntyre	Jul 1848 – Jun 1851
Phillip, Brisbane and Bligh (1851–1856)
William Dumaresq	Jul 1851 – Feb 1856

== Election results ==
=== 1843 ===
1843 New South Wales colonial election, 24 June: Counties of Hunter, Brisbane and Bligh
Candidate	Votes	%
William Dumaresq	58	52.25
Henry Dangar	34	30.63
Donald McIntyre	19	17.12
Total votes	111	100.00

=== 1848 ===
1848 New South Wales colonial election, 29 July: Counties of Hunter, Brisbane and Bligh
Candidate	Votes	%
Donald McIntyre (elected)	19	70
William Dumaresq	6	22
John Lang	2	7
Total votes	27	100

=== 1851 ===
1851 New South Wales colonial election, 23 September: Counties of Phillip, Brisbane and Bligh
Candidate	Votes	%
William Dumaresq	41	52.56
Robert Campbell	37	47.44
Total votes	78	100
