= Peter MacIntyre (colonist) =

Scottish-Australian colonist

Peter MacIntyre (1783 – 13 January 1842), sometimes referred to as Peter McIntyre, was a Scottish born colonist of New South Wales. He is credited as being one of the main pioneers of British colonisation in the Upper Hunter and New England regions.

== Early life ==
MacIntyre was born in Perthshire, Scotland, in 1783 to Donald (Daniel) and Mary MacIntyre. He became a highly regarded agriculturalist and farm manager, winning many prizes for farming, and was employed to manager the estates of the aristocrat, Baron Gwydyr.

== Agent for Thomas Potter MacQueen ==
In 1824, MacIntyre was appointed as the chief agent for Thomas Potter Macqueen, an influential Anglo-Scottish Member of Parliament who had received from the Colonial Secretary, Earl Bathurst, a free grant of 20,000 acres (8100 ha) in the colony of New South Wales. MacQueen chartered the vessels Nimrod and the Hugh Crawford, filled them with servants, livestock, and supplies, and placed them under the control of MacInytre. The ships reached Sydney in April 1825, and MacIntyre, after inspecting the best lands available, chose a locale for the uptake of the massive grant on the banks of the Pages River, east of modern-day Scone.

== Segenhoe and Blairmore ==
MacQueen's land acquisition was named Segenhoe after his family's estate in Bedfordshire, and MacIntyre was placed in charge. Segenhoe initially consisted of 27 employees, flocks of Saxon and Merino sheep and valuable Shorthorn cattle. While MacIntyre was establishing Segenhoe, he also lost no time in furthering his own interests by requesting and receiving other grants of land in Hunter region for himself and his brothers. MacIntyre was granted 2000 acres of prime land along Dart Brook, which he successfully fought a legal battle over its ownership against the surveyor of the area, Henry Dangar, who wanted the land for himself. MacIntyre called his property Blairmore. He also secured land grants of similar size in the region for his brothers, John and Donald MacIntyre. Donald named his grant Kayuga.

Segenhoe became the largest estate in New South Wales, where up to 100 convicts were put to work under MacIntyre to turn it into a productive venture. At his own estate at Blairmore, MacIntyre also built up a large enterprise where by 1829 he had 44 convicts and 8 free servants labouring for him. Local Geawegal and Wonnarua Aboriginal people were pushed out of their lands by the arrival of the Scottish and made raids on the crops grown by these colonisers. MacIntyre's brother, John, led a resultant punitive expedition but was forced to retreat when the Aborigines took up a high position and rolled rocks down upon them.

In 1827, explorer Allan Cunningham organised an expedition of discovery into the uncolonised lands north of the Liverpool Plains. He prepared for his journey at Segenhoe, where MacIntyre became his friend and assisted Cunningham by guiding him through the difficult pass across the Liverpool Range on the initial stage of his expedition. In return, Cunningham named the Macintyre River and Macintyre Brook in his honour.

By 1830, MacIntyre's own agricultural interests had become so profitable that he resigned from the managerial position at MacQueen's Segenhoe estate, where he was replaced by Hamilton Sempill. MacIntyre had a lavish 22 room mansion built for himself at Pitnacree in the town of East Maitland from where he ran his affairs. He recruited Alexander Campbell, who had also left the employment of Segenhoe, to be the direct supervisor of his properties.

== Pastoral squatter in New England ==
MacIntyre soon found the need to have more land and decided to send Campbell out into the uncolonised lands to the north to acquire and stock large squatting leaseholds. Through Campbell's efforts in the 1830s, MacIntyre was able to establish the properties of Long Point (near Breeza), Keera, Byron Plains, Guyra and Falconer Plains.

In 1838, Aboriginal people who escaped the Myall Creek massacre found refuge at MacIntyre's station at Keera. The settlers who perpetrated the massacre followed them there and killed approximately ten more. By 1839, Campbell had established the Byron Plains station on the MacIntyre River, which had been named after his employer. Campbell named the southern part of the Byron run, Inverell, from which the town of Inverell evolved. Large numbers of Aboriginal people resisted the occupancy of their lands at Byron Plains by spearing the shepherds and taking the livestock belonging to MacIntyre.

== Later life and death ==
The severe economic downturn in colonial Australia in the early 1840s took its toll on MacIntyre and he suffered badly from depression. He died in January 1842 at his Pitnacree estate.

== Legacy ==
The Macintyre River, Macintyre Brook and several Macintyre creeks are named after him.
