= Erskine Street Police Station =

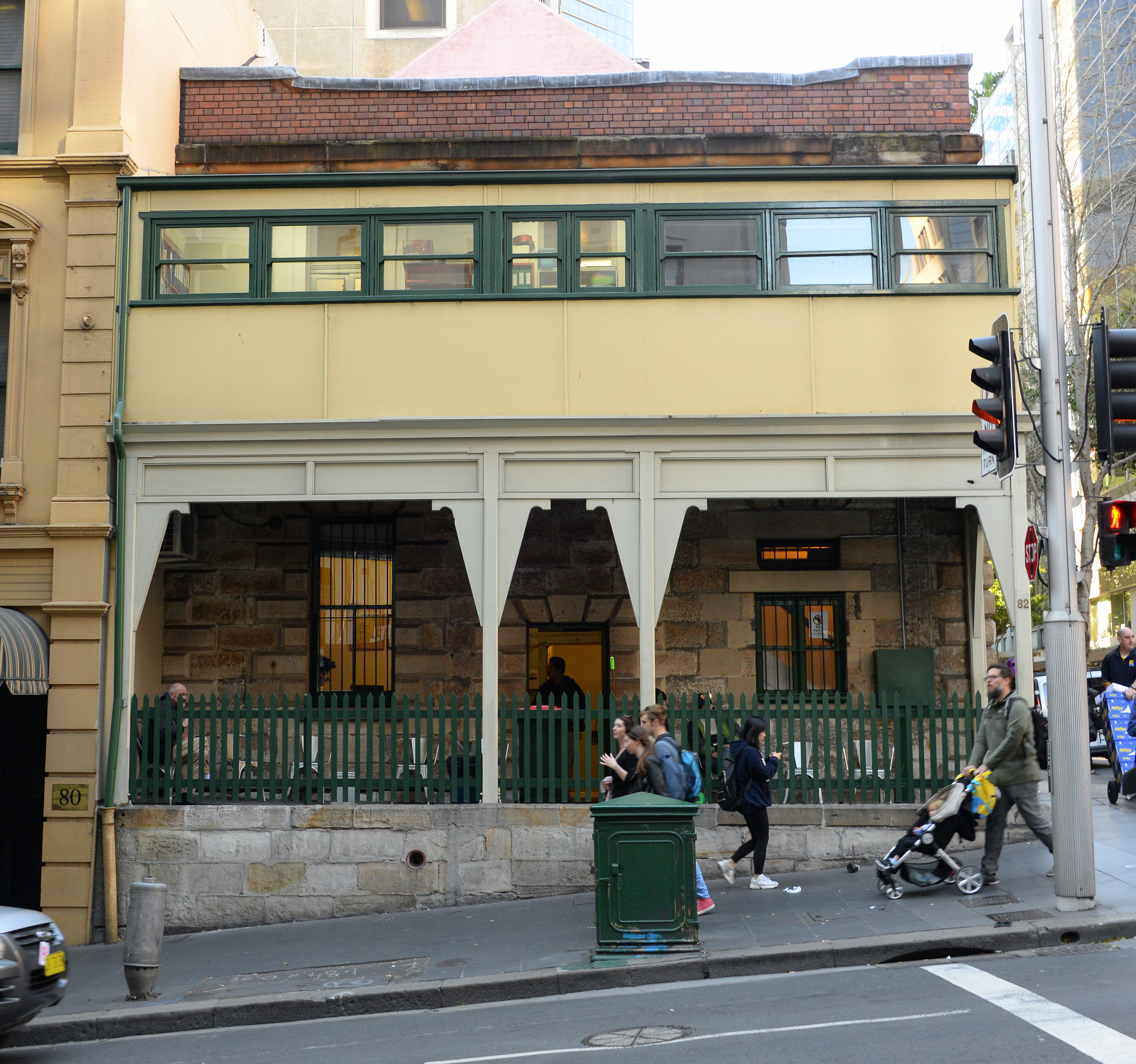
- Erskine Street Police Station (former)

- Location within Sydney Location within Australia
- 33.8666°S 151.2049°E
- Location: 82 Erskine Street, Sydney, City of Sydney, Australia

History
- Built: 1827

Site notes
- Architect: William Dumaresq

New South Wales Heritage Register
- Official name: Watch House
- Type: state heritage (built)
- Designated: 2 April 1999
- Reference no.: 501
- Type: Gaol/Lock-up
- Category: Law Enforcement

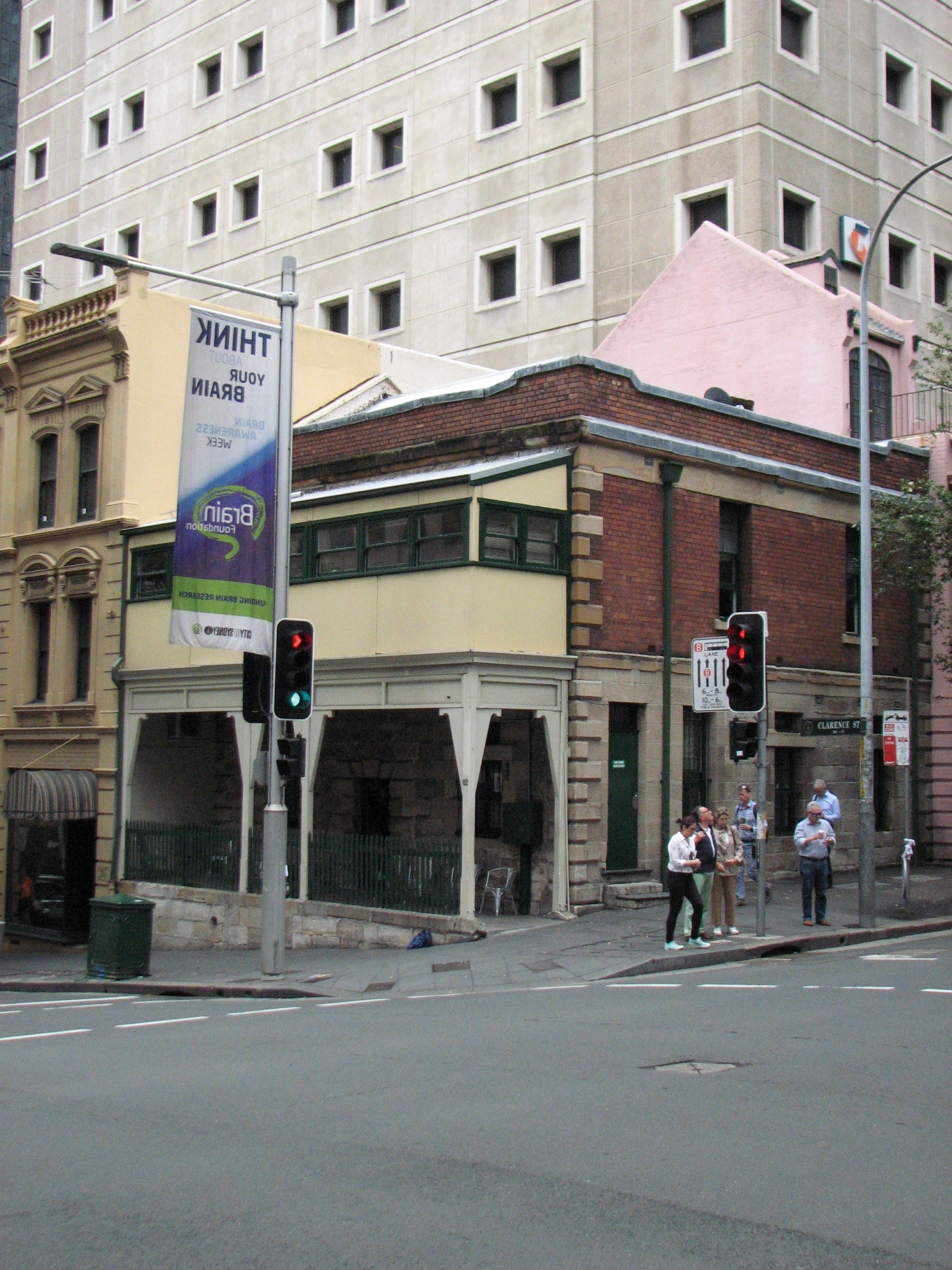
Erskine Street Police Station (former) - corner view

Erskine Street Police Station is a heritage-listed former police station at 82 Erskine Street, Sydney, New South Wales, Australia. It was designed by William Dumaresq and built in 1827. It is also known as the Erskine Street Watch House. It was added to the New South Wales State Heritage Register on 2 April 1999.

== History ==
Close to Darling Harbour, Erskine Street developed initially during the early decades of the nineteenth century as residential and mercantile, servicing the trading character of the harbour. Its proximity to an area considered by authorities to be potentially dangerous, frequented as it was by convicts, sailors and labourers, encouraged the city to locate a watch-house within the residential group. The watch-house at No. 82, built in 1827 and still operating until recently became closely linked with this row of houses.

The former Erskine Street Police Station was designed by William Dumaresq (1793–1868) and is a part of Sydney's early history as well as being an important link with early government law and order ideals.

Additions were made to the original building in 1910 and in the early 1920s.

In 1978, the former police station was formally reserved for use by charitable organisations. It is now occupied by "The Station", a drop-in centre for homeless youth.

== Description ==
The building at 82 Erskine Street is a small two-storey former police station with sandstone construction to the ground floor and brick with stone quoins, string courses and parapet capping to the first floor. The verandah to Erskine Street has been added during the twentieth century and infilled c. 1920. It was originally single storey with an attic, and the roof, now clad in corrugated iron, was originally clad in shingles. The building was burnt out in the mid-twentieth century and the interiors were reconstructed at that time. The building is set at the top of the Erskine Street terraces and next to Laurence & Wherry in Clarence Street, making its location as part of this rare surviving terrace group, of pivotal importance.

The window opening detail to Clarence Street appears to have been altered and the interior was refitted following the fire. The building was reported to be in poor condition overall as of 2005.

== Significance ==
The former Watch House is of historic, aesthetic, social and streetscape significance as one of the early surviving buildings of Sydney. It is a rare example of early Sydney building on a small scale demonstrating construction techniques of the time. The twentieth century additions are well considered and demonstrate the adaptation of early buildings that has taken place. It is part of the Erskine Street group of nineteenth century buildings that is one of the major groups in the city. The building is in a pivotal location on the corner of Clarence and Erskine Streets linking the Erskine Street terraces to 105A Clarence Street and having high street architecture value.

== Heritage listing ==
Erskine Street Police Station was listed on the New South Wales State Heritage Register on 2 April 1999.

== See also ==
- Australian non-residential architectural styles
