= 1851 New South Wales colonial election =

Colonial election for New South Wales, Australia in 1851

← 1848	12 – 25 September 1851	1856 →

36 seats in the New South Wales Legislative Council
- Results of the election, showing winners in each seat. Seats without circles indicate the electorate returned one member.

The 1851 New South Wales colonial election was held between 12 and 25 September. This election was for 36 seats in the New South Wales Legislative Council. The 1848 election had been for 5 year terms however the parliament had been reconstituted following the separation of Victoria. At the same time the council was expanded from 36 to 54 members. The Legislative Council was a hybrid system with 18 appointed members and 36 elected. The Port Philip districts had 6 elected members, which meant there were an additional 18 seats. There were 3 new districts for the northern regions of what would later become Queensland, Stanley, Stanley Boroughs and the pastoral districts of Moreton, Wide Bay, Burnett, and Maranoa and 7 new pastoral districts in western New South Wales. The other 8 additional seats were distributed among the nineteen counties of New South Wales.

The election was conducted with a first past the post system for five year terms. The right to vote was limited to men aged over 21 who owned property worth at least £100 or occupied a house at £10 per year. If a man fulfilled these requirements in multiple constituencies, then he was allowed to cast a vote in each. This was known as plural voting.

In 14 out of 31 districts the candidate was elected unopposed, including all eight pastoral districts, which were seen as representing the interests of squatters.

In 1856 the unicameral Legislative Council was abolished and replaced with an elected Legislative Assembly and an appointed Legislative Council.

There would not be another general election for the Legislative Council until 1978.

== Key dates ==
Date	Event
25 to 27 July 1848	Nominations for candidates for the election.
12 – 25 September 1851	Polling days.
14 October 1851	Opening of Legislative Council.

== Results ==
New South Wales colonial election, 12 – 25 September 1851 Legislative Council << 1843–1851 >>
Enrolled voters					
Votes cast	10,201		Turnout		
Informal votes	0		Informal	0	
Summary of votes by party
Party	Primary votes	%	Swing	Seats	Change
Total	10,201			36	

== See also ==
- Members of the New South Wales Legislative Council, 1851–1856
- Results of the 1851 New South Wales colonial election
