= Piccadilly Cinema =

Cinema in Adelaide, South Australia

- Piccadilly Cinema in 2026
- Former names: Piccadilly Theatre (1940–1967); Forum Cinema (1967–1983)
- Alternative names: The Piccadilly; Piccadilly Cinemas

General information
- Type: Cinema
- Architectural style: Art Deco and Streamline Moderne
- Location: 181–189 O'Connell Street, North Adelaide, South Australia, Australia
- Coordinates: 34.90307°S 138.59443°E
- Completed: 1940
- Opened: 23 October 1940
- Renovated: 2021–2022
- Cost: A£26,000
- Client: D. Clifford Theatres
- Owner: Wallis Cinemas

Technical details
- Material: Brick, concrete and steel

Design and construction
- Architecture firm: Evans, Bruer & Hall, in association with Guy Crick and Bruce W. Furse
- Main contractor: R. J. Nurse

Website
- wallis.com.au/piccadilly/

South Australian Heritage Register
- Official name: Piccadilly Theatre
- Designated: 11 September 1986
- Reference no.: 13496

Piccadilly Cinema(s), formerly Piccadilly Theatre and Forum Cinema (The Forum), and also known as The Piccadilly, is a cinema located on the corner of O'Connell Street and Childers Street in North Adelaide, South Australia.

== History ==
=== 1940: original architecture ===
The cinema was built for D. Clifford Theatres Ltd. (owned by Dan Clifford) as the Piccadilly Theatre in 1940, in art deco / moderne style, with elements of Jazz style and Streamline Modern, for instance its chevron-shaped windows. The building and interiors were designed in 1939 by Greg Bruer, Jack Evans and James Hall (Note: Later responsible for designing the Burnside Ballroom.) (Evans, Bruer, & Hall), in association with Sydney architects Guy Crick and Bruce Furse. The design was similar to Clifford's Vogue Theatre in Kingswood (opened 1939), but with some additional features. Work commenced in February 1940, and was completed by October that year.

Its name was chosen by Clifford, for its association with the busy traffic hub of Piccadilly Circus in London, as well as the Adelaide Hills town of Piccadilly, a place where many English people had settled in the colony of South Australia. Clifford was familiar with the area, having lived on Mount Lofty. A large mural based on a design of Piccadilly Circus by F. Millward Grey, commissioned by Clifford and reproduced by Frank Hussey, (Note: Frank Hussey attended the 9th birthday party of Dan Clifford's daughter in March 1939.) adorned the wall above the circle staircase in the lounge foyer, measuring 10 ft (3.0 m) by 9 ft (2.7 m). The cinema, which had cost £26,000 to build, was built by local builder R. J. Nurse, of Norwood. In a newspaper article announcing the opening, the architectural details of the cinema are described in some detail, including the ventilation system provided by the specially designed windows and vents on the roof. The report says "One of the outstanding features of the theatre is the circuitous stair hall leading from the upper foyer to the circle". It describes cream-coloured walls, maroon seating and curtains, and a rubber covering over the floor which include a large red star.

It was announced on 22 October 1940 that Mr. A. G. Harrison, who was general manager of Clifford Theatres and had been responsible for the design and installation of the lighting in the new theatre, would be the manager of the Piccadilly. The gala opening of the cinema took place on 23 October 1940, raising a total of £108, to be divided among the Red Cross Society, the Fighting Forces Comforts Fund, and the Adelaide Children's Hospital. The films First Love, starring Deanna Durbin, and Missing Evidence were shown, along with Cinesound and 20th Century Fox newsreels and fashion forecasts by Vyvyan Donner. The event was attended by the architects and their wives, luminaries of the film industry, and other eminent people.

The Piccadilly was considered the flagship of the Clifford Circuit.

=== 1940s: change of ownership ===
Clifford's death in 1942 led to Greater Union acquiring the Clifford Theatre Circuit in March 1947. The purchase price of £300,000 for the 22 suburban and regional cinemas was "believed to be the largest motion picture transaction ever made in Australia". The Clifford name was retained as a tribute to the entrepreneur, South Australian staff were retained, and his sister Mary Gordon took over operations. In the 1951–52 edition of Film Weekly Motion Picture Directory, Piccadilly Theatre is listed as being operated by the Clifford Theatre Circuit, with a seating capacity of 1,437.

Greater Union renamed the Piccadilly as the Forum Cinema (aka "The Forum") on 2 March 1967, celebrated by screening the American comedy It's a Mad, Mad, Mad, Mad World in 70mm film. Greater Union renovated the theatre, changing or hiding many of its original features, including the mural, which was covered with a printed image of the Roman Forum on a wooden panel, fixed to the wall by drilling through the mural.

The Forum was closed in February 1983, and Bob Wallis of Wallis Cinemas bought the building in the same year, in order to save it from being demolished.

=== 1980s: heritage listing ===
The building is heritage-listed on both the South Australian Heritage Register and the Register of the National Estate. It was listed on the national register on 21 October 1980, noted for both its architectural and environmental significance, and on the state register on 11 September 1986.

=== 1990: conversion to multiplex ===
In September 1989, a Heritage Agreement was entered into between the proprietors of the property and the State Heritage Branch of South Australia to turn the single auditorium of the original theatre into three smaller theatres in line with 1980s practice. The agreement involves the dismantling and storage of the upper circle balcony on site to be returned if ever the theatre were returned to a single auditorium. Plans were also to involve the incorporation of original materials into the refurbished structure.

Wallis converted the old single-screen picture palace, which had a 1400-seat capacity across its upper and lower level, into a multiplex with three screens, The former balcony became screen one, and screens two and three occupied the former orchestra level. The cinema reopened in 1990 as Piccadilly Cinema.

=== 2022 refurbishment ===
The cinema closed for a major renovation on 6 June 2021. The A$2 million refurbishment has been carried out IA Design and Premier Building Solutions, with the cinema set to reopen on 15 December 2022. A documentary film is being made by Scarlett Media to coincide with the reopening, which includes people's reminiscences of their experiences at the cinema. During the refurbishments, some original features were discovered that had been since covered up, such as the mural of Piccadilly Circus, and terrazzo tiling under a floor that had been carpeted in the 1980s. They were also able to restore a 35mm film projector that had been in storage, which could be used for retrospectives and special events. Restoration of the mural required professional expertise, which was provided by Artlab Australia. In February 2023, the team spent weeks removing embedded metal fixings and injecting adhesives into the loose plasterwork in order to stabilise it, before restoration work could begin. Piccadilly Circus was officially unveiled in late March 2023.

Apart from the interior refit of the theatres, installation of a lift and other features, a new licensed food and drinks lounge space will replace the shopfronts O'Connell Street, where the original candy bar was situated, and there will be a replica of the original sign atop the building. It is intended that the venue can also host live music on weekends sometimes, and, in the future, arts festival and other events.

=== 2026 redevelopment plans ===
In 2026, structural problems emerged, and in July, damage was caused by flooding.

In early November 2026, Peter Malinauskas, the Premier of South Australia, along with Wallis Entertainment, announced plans to build a 16-storey residential block above the cinema. While "the cinema [would] remain at the heart of the site", some of it would need to be demolished. The upper cinema would be rebuilt, but the spiral staircase and other Art Deco elements would be retained. A spokesman for the Art Deco and Modernism Society of South Australia said that it was "surprised" but "open-minded" about the project.

== Location and ownership ==
The cinema's street address is 181–193 O'Connell Street, with the building situated on the corner of O'Connell Street and Childers Street in North Adelaide.

The company that owns it is registered as Piccadilly Cinemas, and its trading name is Piccadilly Cinema. It is part of the Wallis Cinemas family-owned chain.

== Recognition ==
In 2021, the online platform Flicks included the Piccadilly in its list of "The 25 most beautiful cinemas in Australia".

The cinema was featured in a photographic exhibition called Now Showing... Cinema Architecture in South Australia, held at the Hawke Centre's Kerry Packer Civic Gallery in April/May 2024.

== See also ==
- Capri Theatre, built by Clifford as the Goodwood Star
