= Donald McIntyre (New South Wales politician) =

Scottish-Australian politician (1789/1790–1866)

Donald McIntyre (1789 or 1790 – January 1866), sometimes referred to as Donald MacIntyre, was a Scottish-Australian colonial politician, who was a member of the New South Wales Legislative Council from 1848 to 1851.

== Early life ==
McIntyre was born in 1789 or 1790 to Donald (Daniel) and Mary McIntyre from Perthshire, Scotland.

== United States and Canada ==
In 1818, McIntyre emigrated to Georgia in the United States of America. From there he selected land in Blondin, Canada where he lived for four years.

== Australia ==
His brother Peter McIntyre was the agent in New South Wales for the prominent colonist Thomas Potter MacQueen, and in 1825 he established the large Segenhoe property on MacQueen's behalf and also occupied Blairmore for himself, on the land of the Wanaruah and Geawegal people, near what is now Aberdeen. Having received favourable reports from his brother, Donald emigrated to New South Wales and in 1825 he received a land grant and established a property nearby to Blairmore, which he named Kayuga. In 1834 he established another station Dalkeith at what is now Cassilis, on the land of the Wiradjuri people.

In November 1833 a shepherd that McIntyre employed, variously referred to as Edward Hills, Edward Giles or William Gills, hit him in the back of the head with a piece of iron. The shepherd was convicted of attempted murder, sentenced to death, and was hanged in March 1834.

== Legislative Council ==
In 1843 McIntyre stood as a candidate for the Counties of Hunter, Brisbane and Bligh, but was unsuccessful. He stood again in 1848, winning the election. He did not nominate for election in 1851.

== Later life and death ==
On 19 December 1854, McIntyre married Margaret McGreggor. He died on 2 January 1866 at Glebe, at the age of 76.

== See also ==
- Members of the New South Wales Legislative Council, 1843–1851
- Results of the 1843 and 1848 elections

New South Wales Legislative Council
| Preceded by William Dumaresq | Member for Counties of Hunter, Brisbane & Bligh; 1848 – 1851 | Succeeded by William Dumaresq as Member for Counties of Phillip, Brisbane & Bligh |
