= University Hall and Cottages =

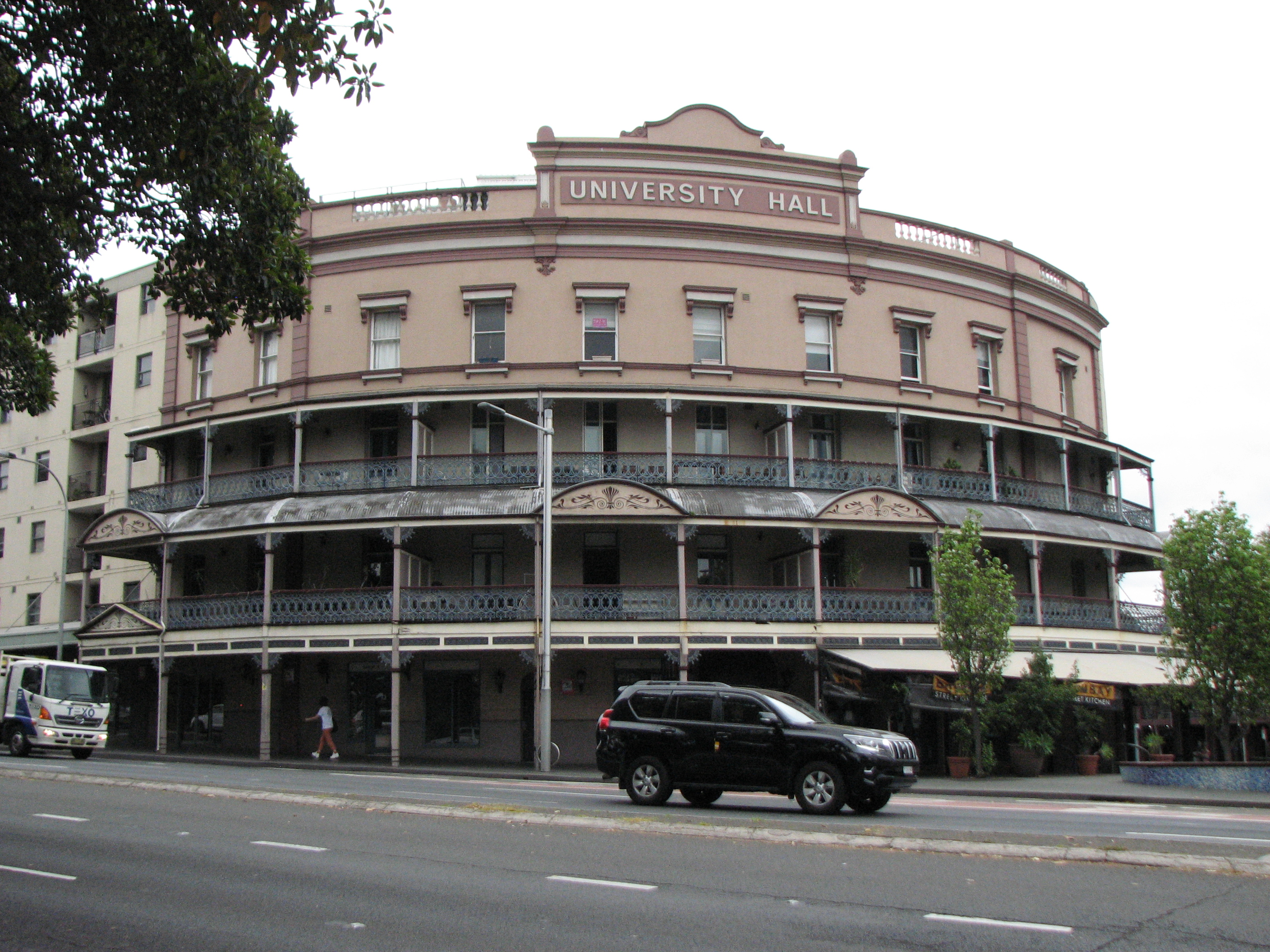
- University Hall and Cottages, 281-285 Broadway, New South Wales

- Location within Sydney Location within Australia
- 33.8844°S 151.1924°E
- Location: 281–285 Broadway, Glebe, City of Sydney, New South Wales, Australia

History
- Built: 1837–1890

New South Wales Heritage Register
- Official name: University Hall & Cottages
- Type: State heritage (built)
- Designated: 2 April 1999
- Reference no.: 128
- Type: Hotel
- Category: Commercial

The University Hall and Cottages is a heritage-listed former hotel and now student accommodation located at 281–285 Broadway in the inner western Sydney suburb of Glebe in the City of Sydney local government area of New South Wales, Australia. It was added to the New South Wales State Heritage Register on 2 April 1999.

== History ==
=== History of the area ===
The Leichhardt area was originally inhabited by the Wangal clan of Aboriginal People. After 1788, diseases such as smallpox and the loss of their hunting grounds caused huge reductions in their numbers and they moved further inland. Since European settlement the foreshores of Blackwattle Bay and Rozelle Bay have developed a unique maritime, industrial and residential character, a character which continues to evolve as areas which were originally residential estates, then industrial areas, are redeveloped for residential units and parklands.

The first formal grant in the Glebe area was a 162-hectare (400-acre) grant to Rev. Richard Johnson, the colony's first chaplain, in 1789. The Glebe (land allocated for the maintenance of a church minister) comprised rolling shale hills covering sandstone, with several sandstone cliff faces. The ridges were drained by several creeks including Blackwattle Creek, Orphan School Creek and Johnston Creek. Extensive swampland surrounded the creeks. On the shale ridges, heavily timbered woodlands contained several varieties of eucalypts while the swamplands and tidal mudflats had mangroves, swamp oaks (Casuarina glauca) and blackwattles (Callicoma serratifolia) after which the bay is named. Blackwattle Swamp was first mentioned by surveyors in the 1790s and Blackwattle Swamp Bay in 1807. By 1840 it was called Blackwattle Bay. Boat parties collected wattles and reeds for the building of huts, and kangaroos and emus were hunted by the early settlers who called the area the Kangaroo Ground. Rozelle Bay is thought to have been named after a schooner which once moored in its waters.

Johnson's land remained largely undeveloped until 1828, when the Church and School Corporation subdivided it into 28 lots, three of which they retained for church use. The Church sold 27 allotments in 1828, north on the point and south around Broadway. The Church kept the middle section where the Glebe Estate is now. Up until the 1970s the Glebe Estate was in the possession of the Church.

On the point the sea breezes attracted the wealthy who built villas. The Broadway end attracted slaughterhouses and boiling down works that used the creek draining to Blackwattle Swamp. Smaller working-class houses were built around these industries. Abbattoirs were built there from the 1860s. When Glebe was made a municipality in 1859 there were pro and anti-municipal clashes in the streets. From 1850 Glebe was dominated by wealthier interests.

Reclaiming the swamp, Wentworth Park opened in 1882 as a cricket ground and lawn bowls club. Rugby union football was played there in the late 19th century. The dog racing started in 1932. In the early 20th century modest villas were broken up into boarding houses as they were elsewhere in the inner city areas. The wealthier moved into the suburbs which were opening up through the railways. Up until the 1950s Sydney was the location for working class employment, it was a port and industrial city. By the 1960s central Sydney was becoming a corporate city with service-based industries, capital intensive not labour-intensive. A shift in demographics occurred, with younger professionals and technical and administrative people servicing the corporate city wanting to live close by. Housing was coming under threat and the heritage conservation movement was starting. The Fish Markets arrived in the 1970s. An influx of students came to Glebe in the 1960s and 1970s.

=== University Hotel ===
Originally the University Hotel, University Hall is home to students from the nearby University of Sydney. In c. 1990 the University Hall was renovated and expanded for use as apartments.

== Heritage listing ==
As at 22 February 2013, the townscape is significant as a landmark building that serves as "the gateway to Glebe" located at the junction of Broadway, Parramatta Road, and Glebe Point Road. The 1837 earlier building was sited in expectation of a proposed new railway. The ballroom roof truss construction is a significant example of building technology and design. Terraces are rare surviving early residential buildings. The hotel was built between 1889 and 1890.

The University Hall and Cottages was listed on the New South Wales State Heritage Register on 2 April 1999.

== See also ==
- Australian non-residential architectural styles
- Media related to University Hall and Cottages at Wikimedia Commons
