= Glebe Point Road =

Road in Sydney, Australia

Glebe Point Road, Glebe New South Wales
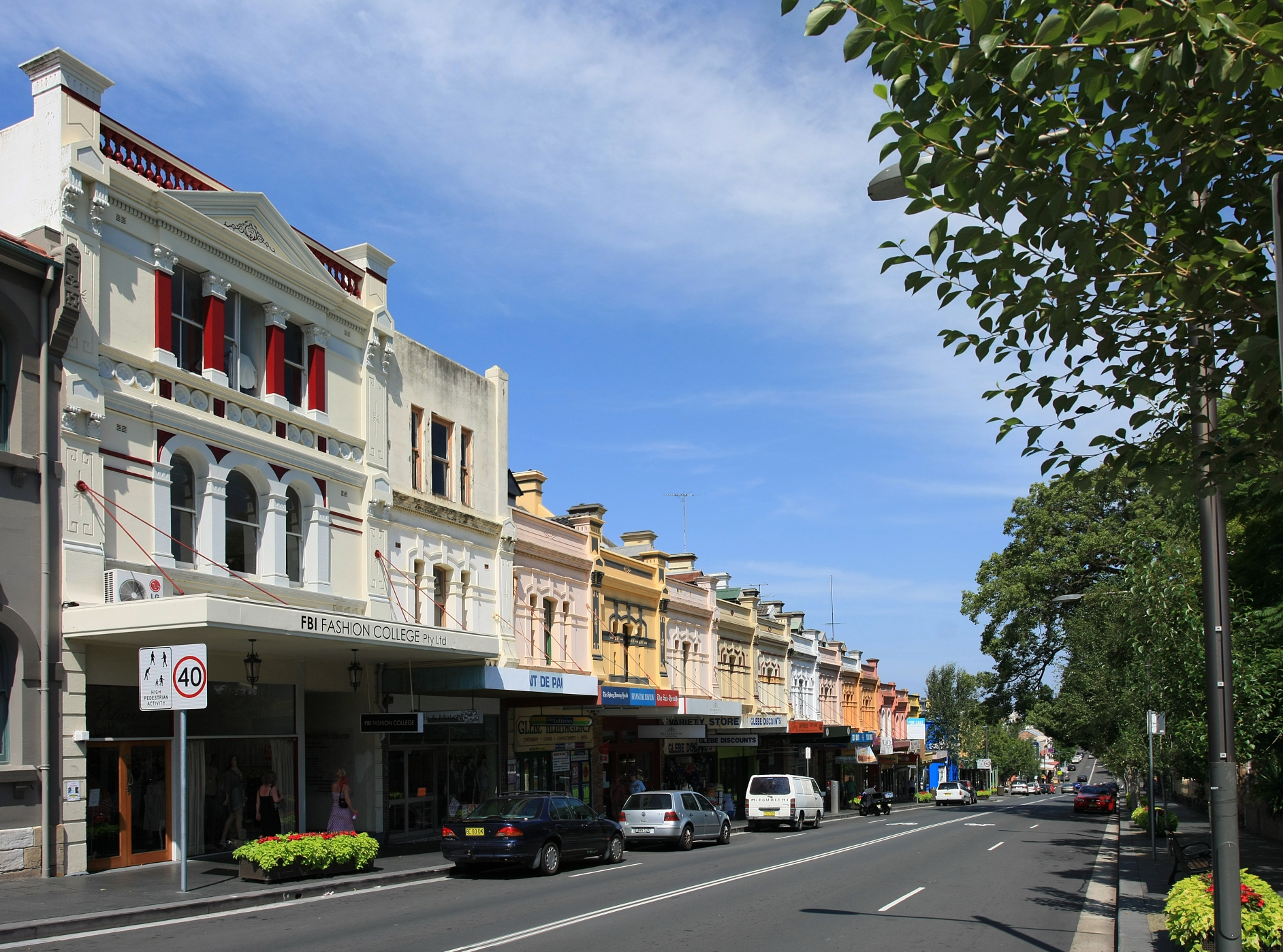
- Glebe Point Road looking south
- Coordinates: 33.871676°S 151.180498°E (Northwest end); 33.884525°S 151.192981°E (Southeast end)

General information
- Type: Street
- Length: 1.9 km (1.2 mi)

Major junctions
- Northwest end: Federal Road; Glebe, Sydney
- Bridge Road
- Southeast end: Parramatta Road; Glebe, Sydney

Location(s)
- Suburb(s): Glebe

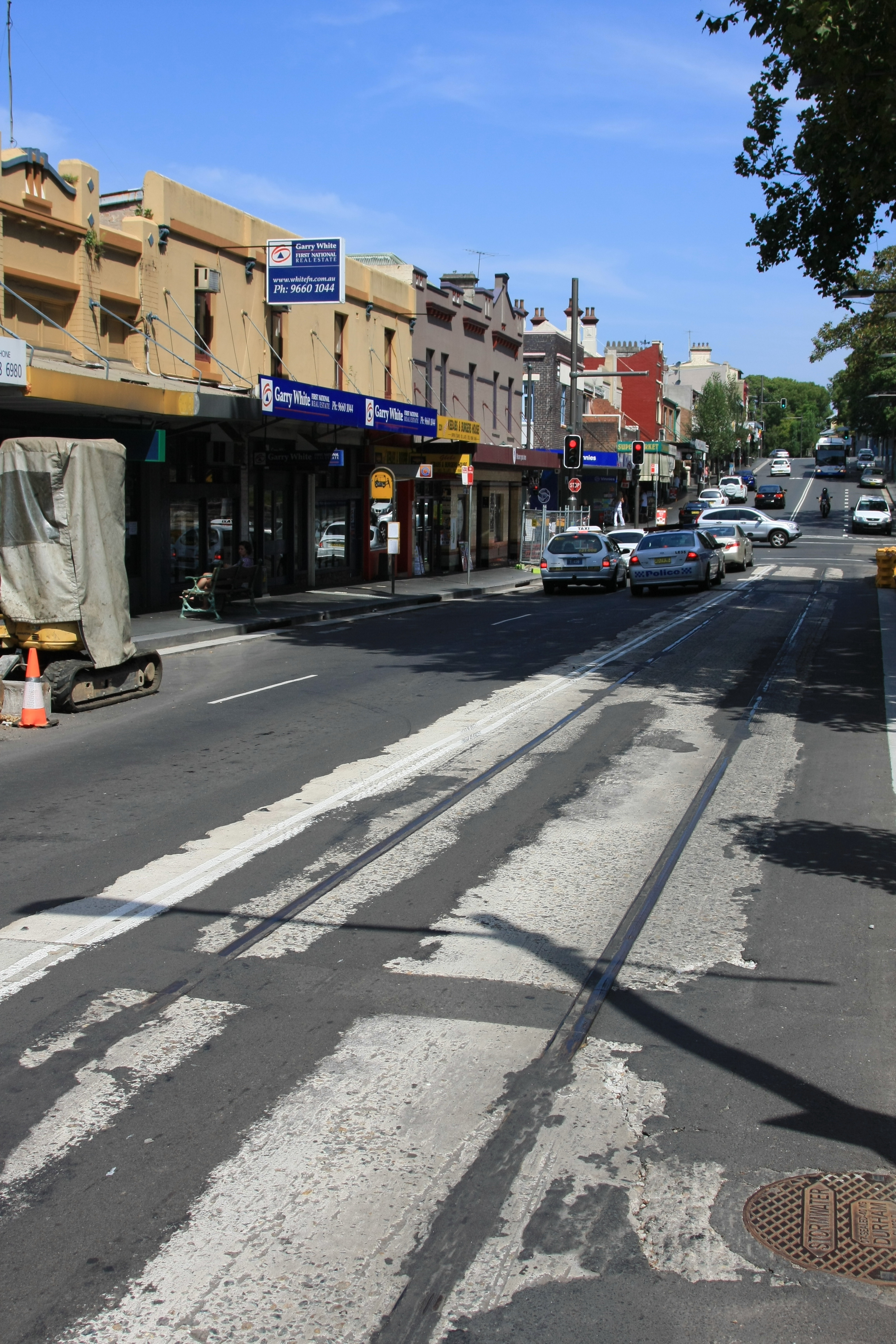
Exposed tram track in July 2010

Glebe Point Road is the main road of the inner city suburb of Glebe in Sydney, New South Wales, Australia. It is a boutique shopping strip with numerous restaurants and cafés.

== History ==
Glebe Point Road is one of the most historic streets in Sydney, dating from the early days of settlement, when the area was granted to the Anglican Church.

St John's Church was built on the corner of Glebe Point Road and St Johns Road, after a design by Edmund Blacket. Built from 1868–1870, the church is listed on the (now defunct) Register of the National Estate.

Blacket also built his own family home, the heritage-listed Bidura, on Glebe Point Road in 1858.

There was once a post office at no. 181a.

There was an active tramway on Glebe Point Road between 1892 and 1958, when the trams were replaced by buses. Roadworks near the Bridge Road crossing in late 2009 uncovered a section of the original tram tracks, which were left exposed by the City of Sydney to serve as a historical reminder.

The street is the main entry point to the Glebe Estate, which was originally owned by the Anglican Church and which was taken over by the Whitlam government in 1973 for an urban renovation program.

=== Valhalla Cinema ===
The Astor Cinema, designed in simple Art Deco style by theatre architects Kaberry & Chard, opened at no. 166D Glebe Point Road on 1 December 1937. It remained independently operated throughout its existence, through many changes of name.

The Astor was closed in November 1959 and was used as a warehouse for theatre equipment, before re-opening in 1968 as a second-run cinema. It was renamed Filmor Red Star Cinema in 1970 and began screening cult films and experimental films. After being acquired by new owners in 1971, they made alterations to the stage so that it could host live performances as well as film, and renamed it New Arts Cinema. Stage productions included The Rocky Horror Show for three years from 1973. This was followed by Oh Calcutta, but the performers were arrested by police after a few nights, as the show was banned.

After a brief closure in mid-1978, the New Arts Cinema reopened as the Curzon Cinema, screening mainstream films, but did not last long. After a brief return to live shows, it was put up for sale. In December 1979, after the lease was purchased by Chris Kiely, it reopened as the Valhalla Cinema, and began showing revival and arthouse films and occasional rock concerts. In 1987, Kiely purchased the freehold on the building, and undertook renovations to split the cinema into two; one using the circle and the other the stalls. The cinema was very successful until a new 10-screen Hoyts multiplex and a new four-screen arthouse opened nearby.

Valhalla Cinema was closed on 31 January 1999. A new company took over the lease, but that did not work, and Kiely again reopened the Valhalla. Despite many loyal patrons, it could not sustain enough income, and Kiely was forced to close again on 3 August 2005. Eventually Kiely sold to developers, who converted the building into office and retail space. The National Trust of Australia (NSW) were consulted in an attempt to get the building listed for its heritage value, but it was too late. In 2007 the interior was gutted.

== Description ==
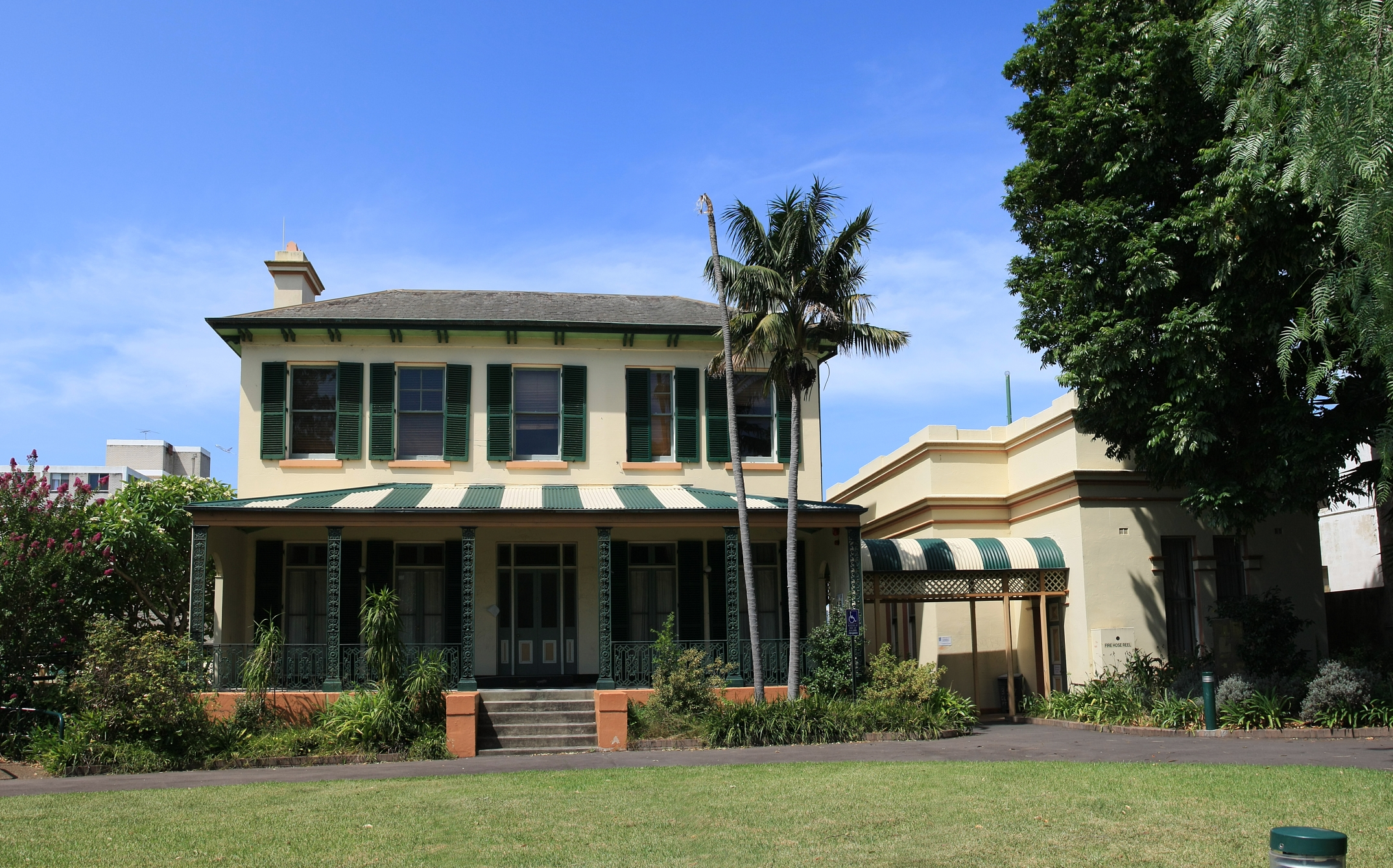
Bidura, former home of colonial architect, Edmund Blacket

Glebe Point Road's southern end begins at the northeastern tip of Victoria Park, where Broadway becomes Parramatta Road. This area is frequented by a mix of students from the University of Sydney and University of Technology as well as residents of nearby suburbs: Darlington, Ultimo, Chippendale, and Haymarket (also known as Chinatown). Glebe Point Road extends north through Glebe, terminating at Bicentennial Park located on Rozelle Bay.

The start of Glebe Point Road has trendy cafés and restaurants. Further down the road are very fashionable and expensive terrace houses with city and harbour views that go for over a kilometre to the water's edge. From around the 1980s, the area has become gentrified, resulting in rising property and rental prices. This led to an increase in white-collar workers and a decrease in students, artists, writers and musicians. In 2009, professionals, administrative workers and sales staff made up 44 per cent of all residents (above the city average of 30 per cent).

There is student accommodation at the heritage-listed University Hall and Cottages, located on the junction of Glebe Point Road, Broadway, and Parramatta Road. The cottages date from 1837 and the hall, originally the University Hotel, was built between 1889 and 1890.

Transdev John Holland bus route 370 and Transit Systems bus routes 431 and 433 traverse Glebe Point Road.

== Points of interest ==
=== Gleebooks ===
Gleebooks is an independent bookstore that has been operating on Glebe Point Road since 1975. Ray Jelfs and Tony Gallagher opened the store as a second-hand bookshop at 191 Glebe Point Road on 26 January 1975, which was formerly the site of Peacock's Hollywood Lending Library and Reading Room. Sydney University student Roger Mackell worked part-time at Gleebooks in the mid 1970s, and after Gallagher's sudden death in 1978, he and David Gaunt kept the shop going by creating a partnership. They expanded the business to include new books, and their reputation grew, especially among students and academics from the nearby Sydney University.

In 1990 Gleebooks moved to a larger location at 49 Glebe Point Road, the site of a boxing ring and gymnasium in the early twentieth century, and in 2008 opened a branch in Blackheath in the Blue Mountains.

In 2023 the owners undertook a major renovation of the premises, temporarily relocating to the old Glebe Post Office building at 181a Glebe Point Road and reopening at no. 49 in February 2024. As of February 2024 Roger Mackell and David Gaunt remain the owners.

The store hosts weekly discussions with public intellectuals and journalists, and has hosted launches and events with many literary luminaries, including Salman Rushdie, Margaret Atwood, Colm Toibin, David Malouf, and Annie Proulx.
