= 1843 New South Wales colonial election =

Colonial election for New South Wales, Australia in 1843

- 15 June 1843 – 3 July 1843

24 seats in the New South Wales Legislative Council
- Results of the election, showing winners in each seat. Seats without circles indicate the electorate returned one member.

The 1843 New South Wales colonial election was held between 15 June and 3 July 1843 and was Australia's first colonial election. This election was for 24 seats in the New South Wales Legislative Council and it was conducted in 15 single-member constituencies, two 2-member constituencies and one 5-member constituency, all with a first past the post system. This included 6 members in what became the Colony of Victoria and a single member for the coast north of Newcastle. The Legislative Council was a hybrid system with 36 members, 24 elected, 6 appointed by virtue of their office (Colonial Secretary, Colonial Treasurer, Auditor-General, Attorney General, Commander of the forces and Collector of Customs) and 6 nominated. The appointments and elections were for five year terms.

The right to vote was limited to men aged over 21 who owned property worth at least £200 or occupied a house at £20 per year. There was a higher requirement to be a member of the Council, owning property worth £2,000 or income from real estate of £100 per year. If a man fulfilled these requirements in multiple constituencies, then he was allowed to cast a vote in each. This was known as plural voting.

This was the first election held and the first form of representative government in Australia. The Governor retained considerable power, including the power to disallow bills and in appointing 12 of the 36 seats. As government appointments were expected to support the government, it only required the support of 6 of the 24 elected members to pass any bill.

== Background ==
The British Parliament passed an act in early 1843 which allowed for a "blended" Legislative Council, where 24 members would be elected and 12 members would be appointed by the Governor. News of the act had reached New South Wales prior to its formal adoption in 1842, and people began to consider whether to stand for election or not. However, Governor Sir George Gipps would not take any official action for the campaign before the official act arrived in New South Wales.

Each electorate would only conduct the poll in the main settlements inside each electoral district. Given the long distance it would take to travel from remote areas to the main settlement, many voters who would otherwise be eligible were effectively disenfranchised because of the distance.

== Key dates ==
Date	Event
13 to 27 June 1843	Nominations for candidates for the election.
15 June to 3 July 1843	Polling days.
1 August 1843	Opening of new Legislative Council.

== Results ==
Six of the eighteen electorates were won by candidates who were unopposed, for two reasons. The first being the overwhelming likelihood that the person standing would easily win the election, so all other candidates would withdraw. One example of this would be Hannibal Macarthur in Parramatta. The other was a much more remote electorate, where multiple candidates were not interested in standing for election.

Familial ties ran deep in this election, with 6 politically-connected and well known families in the colony contributing 12 members to the Legislative Council, along with marriage connections between candidates.

There was no party system at this election, and every candidate stood as an independent. This did not mean there weren't sectional and factional interests in the newly elected council, however. In what would become a forerunner of the "Ministerialists", those who supported Governor Gipps during this election were known as "placemen". Another divide during this election was between Protestants and Catholics, where the few Catholic candidates that did stand did not claim they would be defending catholicsm or Catholic sectional interests.

The election was marked by a riot at Sydney involving 4-500 men, which resulted in a fatality, and a smaller riot at Windsor. The Colonial Observer remarked that the leaders of the riots were "the very dregs of the Irish population." Due to the enfranchisement qualifications at the time, it is unlikely that many of these people could vote, which could have been a motivating factor in the riot.

New South Wales colonial election, 15 June 1843 – 3 July 1843 Legislative Council –1848 >>
Enrolled voters					
Votes cast	9,179		Turnout		
Informal votes	0		Informal	0.00	
Summary of votes by party
Party	Primary votes	%	Swing	Seats	Change
Total	9,179			24	

== See also ==
- Members of the New South Wales Legislative Council, 1843–1851
- Results of the 1843 New South Wales colonial election
- Wentworth—Bland flag
