= Persia Campbell =

Australian economist

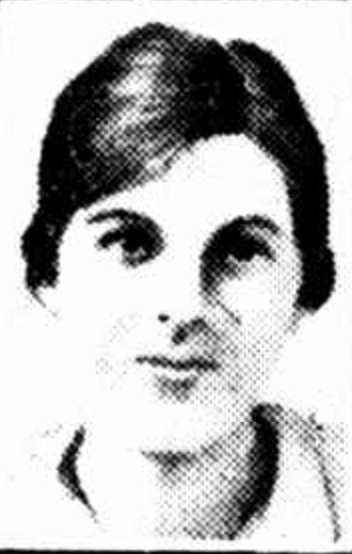
- Persia Campbell in 1931
- Born: Persia Gwendoline Crawford Campbell; March 15, 1898; Nerrigundah, New South Wales, Australia
- Died: March 2, 1974 (aged 75); Flushing, Queens, New York, USA
- Other name: Mrs Edward Rice
- Citizenship: Australian, American (from 1936)
- Occupations: economist, consumer rights advocate
- Children: 2

Persia Gwendoline Crawford Campbell (1898–1974) was an Australian-born American economist who championed consumer rights worldwide.

== Early life ==
Persia Crawford Campbell, was born March 15, 1898, at Nerrigundah, New South Wales. She was the daughter of school teachers, Rodolfe Archibald Clarence Campbell and his second wife Beatrice Hunt. Persia was educated in Sydney at Fort Street Girls' High School before going on to university, where she took her B.A from the University of Sydney in 1918, followed by her M.A. in 1920. She had obtained first-class honours in history.

== Economic studies ==
Campbell travelled to England, where she attended the London School of Economics on scholarship. She took her M.Sc. in economics in 1922. As a result of this study, she published Chinese Coolie Immigration in 1923, as part of the Studies in Economic and Political Science series. Her research investigated the abuse of indentured-labour regulations.

Campbell then visited Bryn Mawr College, in the U.S., to study immigration problems. She returned to Australia in 1923 working as an assistant-editor for the Australian Encyclopaedia in Sydney. She also lectured for the Workers' Educational Association. Campbell was employed as an assistant research officer in the Industrial Commission of New South Wales in 1927 before transferring to the Bureau of Statistics in 1928. Her interest in Fabian socialism and feminism, gained the attention of many in intellectual circles. She addressed the National Council of Women of New South Wales on the need for the educational and professional advancement of women. She also judged their peace essay competition. This led to her association with women graduates' organizations in Australia and the Pan Pacific (and South East Asian) Women's Association. She joined the New South Wales branch of the Institute of Pacific Relations which aimed 'to study conditions of the Pacific people with a view to the improvement of their mutual relationships'. She co-edited a publication Studies in Australian Affairs (1928). She was scathing of the screening practices being applied to Southern Europeans emigrating to Australia.

== Move to the United States ==
Campbell was offered a Rockefeller fellowship to study agricultural policy in the US in 1930. A year later she married Edward Rice, a widower with three children. They lived in Flushing, New York, and their family expanded to two further children. As the Great Depression lowered farm prices throughout the world, Campbell studied American responses to it. She published her findings in American agricultural policy (1933) which examined the Federal Farm Board. She also presented at conferences, including the Pan Pacific Women's Conference of 1934 where she analysed women's contribution to consumer policy. She continued to publish in journals, eventually taking her PhD from Columbia University in 1940. Her thesis had been on Consumer representation in the New Deal. Campbell took U.S. citizenship in 1936. Her husband died in 1939.

== Consumer activism ==
Campbell took a position in the faculty of economics at Queens College, City University of New York in 1940. Her role was described as the head of the college's consumer council. She was chairwoman of social studies for the New York branch of the American Association of University Women. She was appointed director of consumer services by the Civilian Defense Volunteer Office, New York in 1942, where she hoped to make improvements to consumer education, through courses offered at Queens College, through publication, and through the use of volunteers to monitor goods and prices. However she left the role in 1943, frustrated by the attitudes of the time to hiring women or recognising their potential to influence domestic economies. Eventually Campbell's arguments for women to use their power in the marketplace, led to calls for standard labelling of goods. She published a textbook entitled The Consumer Interest in 1949.

For the years 1948, 1949 and 1951 Campbell was an adviser on consumer affairs to American delegations to the Food and Agriculture Organization (FAO) conferences of the United Nations. Governor Averell Harriman of New York State appointed her to his cabinet in 1955 in the role of consumer counsel. She was able to make some improvements to legislation through this role, but was most successful in getting through to people through radio interviews and in meetings where she worked to change business practices and regulations.

She continued to chair the economics department at Queens College from 1960 to 1965. She published a biography of Mary Williamson Harriman in 1960. She attended conferences in Tokyo and Canberra for the Pan Pacific and South East Asian Women's Association. She was recognised by the Australian Consumers Association for her work with the Consumers Union of the United States. She also helped establish the International Organisation of Consumer Unions, which comprised U.S. and Australian members. She was a delegate to the United Nations Educational, Scientific and Cultural Organisation conference on adult education in 1960. Campbell was appointed to the President John F. Kennedy's Consumers Advisory Council in 1962, which tried to enact "truth in packaging" legislation. She also sought to use radio and television as a medium to reach low income earners and educate them about consumer issues, including a program called You, the Consumer.

Campbell retired from Queens College in 1965. She held an honorary appointment with the University of North Carolina the following year, and travelled widely. She was chairperson of the international aid committee of the International Organisation of Consumers Unions and represented this body at meetings of the United Nations. She wrote for the United Nations journal, International Development Review discussing economic and social programs. She later served on President Lyndon B. Johnson's committee on consumer interests in 1964, and his national advisory committee to his representative in international trade negotiations. Campbell felt strongly that much of the debate about consumer rights was unsuccessful because of race discrimination. By 1968, her interests in the area were moving toward a study of third world economies. She was a delegate at the United Nations Conference on the Human Environment in 1972.

Persia Campbell died March 2, 1974, in Flushing, New York. She was survived by her two children and three stepchildren. The Campbell Dome lecture hall at Queens College was named in her honor.

Her papers are collected within the Center for the Study of the Consumer Movement and the New York State Archives.

== Memberships ==
- Member-American Economic Association
- Director-Consumers Union of the U.S.
- Member-American Association of University Women
