= Bidura =

Bidura House
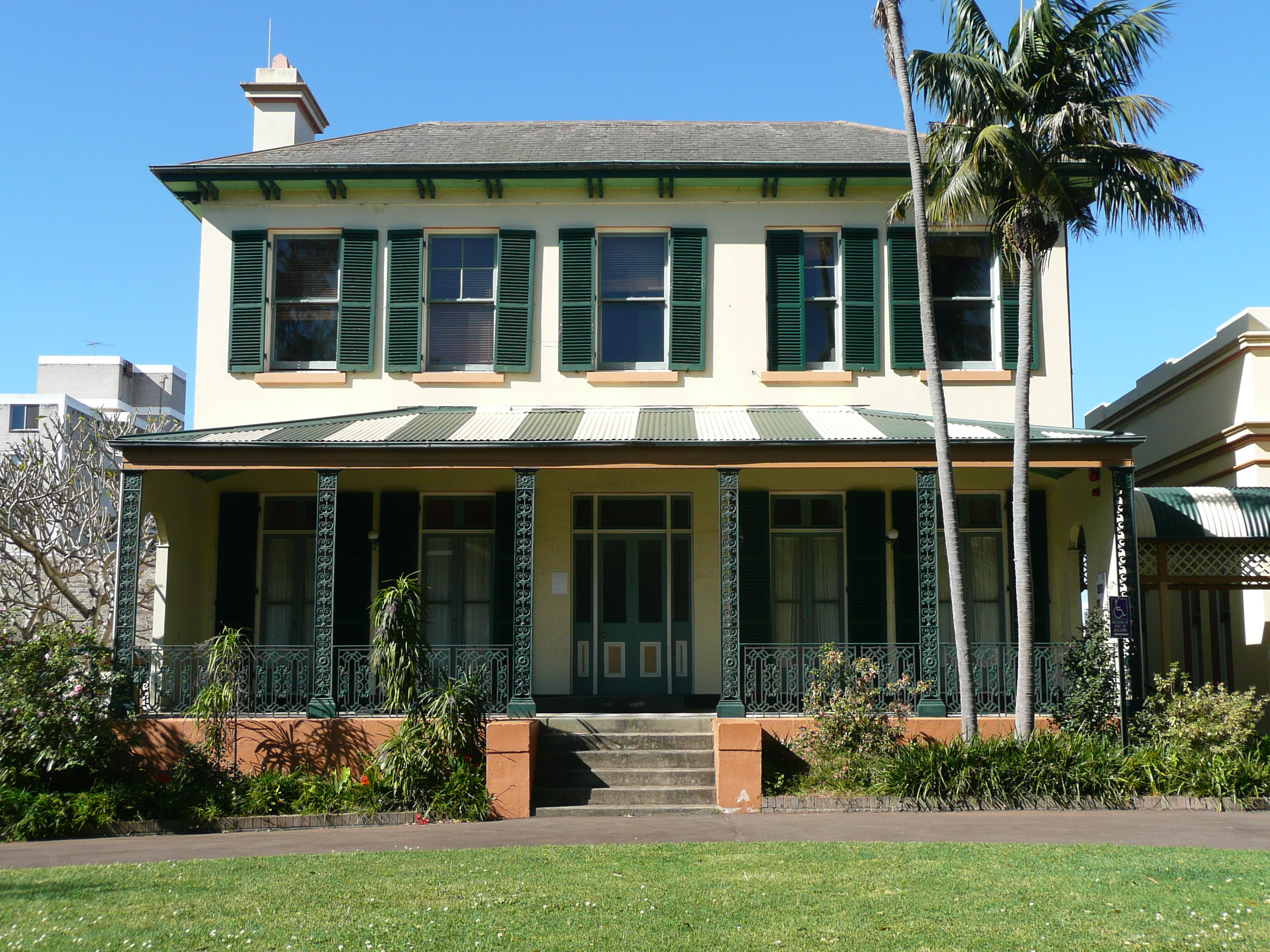
- Bidura, pictured in 2009.

- Location within Sydney Location within Australia
- 33.8764°S 151.1847°E
- Location: 357 Glebe Point Road, Glebe, City of Sydney, New South Wales, Australia

History
- Built: 1860

Site notes
- Architect: Edmund Thomas Blacket
- Architectural styles: Victorian Regency; Victorian Italianate

New South Wales Heritage Register
- Official name: Bidura House Group
- Type: State heritage (built)
- Designated: 28 August 2017
- Reference no.: 1994
- Type: House
- Category: Residential buildings (private)

Bidura House, or simply, Bidura, is a heritage-listed former residence, orphanage and office building located at 357 Glebe Point Road in the inner western Sydney suburb of Glebe, New South Wales, Australia. It was designed by Edmund Thomas Blacket and built in 1860. It is also known as Bidura House Group. It was added to the New South Wales State Heritage Register on 28 August 2017.

== History ==
=== Indigenous history ===
The traditional inhabitants of the Sydney city region are the Gadigal people of the Eora Nation. Despite the destructive impact of first contact, Gadigal culture and connections in Glebe endure. In addition to the Gadigal, Aboriginal people from elsewhere gradually moved into Glebe as it developed into an inner Sydney suburb.

=== European land grants and subdivision ===
The subject site is on land that was part of a 1790 grant of 162 hectares (400 acres) by Governor Phillip to the Church of England, officially named St Phillip's Glebe but known as "the Glebe". When the church reserve was subdivided into 27 allotments in 1828, Lots 3 and 4 of the subdivision were purchased by William Dumaresq, a captain in the Royal Staff Corps. Dumaresq first subdivided his land as the "Boissier Estate" in 1840 with Lots 1 and 2 purchased by businessman Stuart Alexander Donaldson in 1841.

=== Victorian residence 1858-1920 ===
The property was purchased by prominent colonial architect, Edmund Blacket, as family home while he was working on the University of Sydney in 1857. The landscape was still largely covered in dense bush at this time and Blacket is recorded to have "found it necessary to have four men to escort him home through the heavy timber after a day's work at his city office", along the track that became Ferry Road. Blackett built the two-storey house and single storey annex c. 1860. Sketches of the building, dating from 1865, and likely drawn by his daughter Edith, label the building "Our House". Blacket sold the house following the death of his wife Sarah in 1870.

The ballroom was constructed by subsequent owner, Robert Fitz Stubbs, in the 1870s. The extensive rear garden contained a number of outbuildings including a detached kitchen, scullery, servants' hall, store, servant's bedrooms, laundry and ironing room, workshop, tool house, two bedrooms, garden-house, carriage house, stables, and horse-boxes. In 1904, the northern corner of the property was subdivided and sold by subsequent owner, Frederick John Perks.

=== Joint welfare and judicial role 1920-1925 ===
In 1920 the site purchased by the NSW Government for use as accommodation for wards of the state. Children lived and were schooled on site. Originally called the Depot for State Children, but also known as Bidura Orphanage or Glebe Girls Home. The site originally had two functions:

1. as a receiving home: all wards of the state come to Bidura for processing after they had been removed from their families
2. as a remand facility: it also housed children awaiting trial in the Metropolitan Children's Court.

At the time, under this dual function a common "child saving" objective saw children who had committed crimes, those who were neglected or abandoned, those who were from single parent families, or had Aboriginal parents, and those who were simply poor processed in the same way. The site was the central point of child welfare in NSW, being the first place most children saw after they were taken from their families and the transit point for their referral to other institutions or programs. As a result, this was the place many members of the Forgotten Australians and Stolen Generations entered "care".

=== Development of the Metropolitan Girls Shelter 1925-1940s ===
From 1925, the two functions began to be separated when the NSW Government reorganised its approach to child justice institutions. The government had moved the Children's Court from Ormond House, Paddington to Albion Street, Surry Hills in 1911, and established two designated sites to house children awaiting trial-a nearby property, Royleston, was designated for use as the Metropolitan Boys shelter and a new building, the Metropolitan Girls' Shelter, was constructed fronting Avon Street at the rear of Bidura House. Both Bidura and the Girls Shelter operated on the subject site under the same administration and appear to have shared facilities for the first few decades, with the entire site known as the Metropolitan Girls' Shelter until the 1940s. The site as a whole was notoriously known as a place where cruelty and abuse were an everyday occurrence. This has caused significant ongoing distress and associated health and social problems for the former residents and their families, as specifically recognised in the Forgotten Australian's report of 2004.

=== Separation of Bidura and Metropolitan Girls Shelter 1940-1977 ===
By 1943 the Victorian house group was simply known as Bidura and appears to have been both administratively and physically separated from the Metropolitan Girls Shelter fronting Avon Street. The site was subject to protests by Women's Liberationists in the 1970s for the plight of female residents. Adaptation of all buildings and erection of additional outbuildings was undertaken in line with shifts in thinking, for example changing of open dormitories to single rooms, and adaptation of the ballroom for use as a school.

=== Establishment of offices late 1970s-present ===
Bidura closed as a residential facility in 1976/77 and the house was restored by the NSW Department of Public Works and used as office space for what is now known as the Department of Family and Community Services. Restoration works included demolition of the rear veranda and construction of a new one, removal of non-original internal partitioning and repartitioning of some areas for new purposes, reinstatement of some infilled openings and bricking up of others, replacement or removal of bathroom and kitchen fitouts, replacement of timber windows and doors, installation of new electrical, lighting and ventilation services. A children's court was on the site from 1983 to 2017, during which time it was known as the Bidura Children's Court. The site was sold into private ownership in 2014, with the Department of Justice vacating in 2017.

=== Institutional history ===
The institutional history of Bidura has been recognised by Federal and State governments through a series of reports. The National Museum of Australia's Inside exhibition, (promised in the National Apology to the Forgotten Australians and Former Child Migrants delivered by Australian Prime Minister Kevin Rudd on 16 November 2009 in Canberra) noted that three Senate reports were undertaken following pressure from interest groups for the government to put on record the histories that had been hidden or unrecognised. The reports acknowledged that children had experienced systems of "care" and social attitudes that had utterly failed to protect them. It also noted that the places associated with these Australians, like the Bidura House Group, despite being adaptively reused for other purposes, or left derelict or demolished, continue to be repositories of these historic events and connections.

In 2016 local heritage groups pushed to save Bidura, which led to the NSW Land & Environment Court rejecting a refusal of a DA by Sydney City Council for a proposed $43m redevelopment of the rear of the property, involving the five-storey 1983 Brutalist style court building as well as Bidura house and garden. Two apartment blocks were proposed, up to eight storeys high, behind (east of) the villa, which was proposed for retail and office use. In early 2017 the developer lodged an amended $29m DA proposing one seven-storey apartment building, which was due to be heard by the court by February 2018.

== Description ==
Landscape

The street frontage is delineated by a timber picket fence. The landscaped area at the front of the Bidura House group is a notable feature of the site, where the early carriageway alignment, garden layout, lawns, and stone retaining wall form a fine urban setting for the early residence. There are several mature trees located near the street frontage and to the immediate rear of the residence.

Exterior

The front and rear facades of this three-storey Victorian Regency house feature the symmetry characteristic of the style, as evident in the overall rectangular form, the hipped roof and the arrangement of chimneys, windows, doors and verandas. On both sides, however, the addition of windows has produced a less symmetrical appearance. The external walls are of rendered, coursed and painted brick. The double-hung windows are timber, with external timber louvred shutters. The roof is clad in slate with decorative eaves brackets and patinated copper gutters, and features a central valley which appears to spill into a rainwater head on the north-western facade. On either side of the house stand two tall chimneys with corbelled cornices and metal chimney pots.

Interior

On the ground floor a wide partly glazed front door with sidelights and highlights opens into a central entrance hall with a marble and slate floor and a secondary hall with polished non-original timber flooring beyond. Off the main hall lie a square room on the north-west side and a larger rectangular room on the south-east. Off the second hall is another square room to the north-west and a rectangular room to the south-east. At the north-west end of the second hall is the main timber staircase, with simple timber balusters and a timber handrail. The rooms have plastered walls and chimney breasts and, excepting the front north-west room where the chimney has been bricked up, metal fireplaces with marble mantels and slate hearths. All have ornate cornices, picture rails, high skirting boards with moulded tops, wide architraves and four-panel doors. Although high ceilings with ornate ceiling roses are found in every room, the ceilings themselves are contemporary and plain, with inset downlights. The western corner room has a non-original polished timber floor; the other three rooms are carpeted. The current colour scheme uses shades in the pink-orange spectrum for detailing as well as green in the cornices, with a softer beige for the walls.

The first floor features three square rooms and, in the southern corner, a larger rectangular room echoing that below. To the north-east of the central landing are a toilet and handwashing area fitted and tiled in relatively contemporary style, while the parallel area to the south-west is occupied by a storeroom. The four main rooms are fitted as on the ground floor; in this case it is the large southern corner room whose chimney breast has been bricked up rather than featuring a fireplace. The south-western wall of the stairwell shows patching from removal of the stairs once leading up to the 'Matron's WC'. The current colour scheme is generally more muted than that of the ground floor.

The lower ground or basement level, once comprised mainly working areas, has square areas in three corners and a larger rectangular room in the eastern corner, echoing that on the ground floor. These have been divided to create a passage to the Annexe, two toilets and cleaner's store. The wall originally dividing the larger area into two rooms (scullery and perhaps pantry) has been largely removed to form one room. At the bottom of the stairwell is a possibly original tongue and groove timber door with long strap hinges, leading to the outside. Opposite the stairs across the central hallway is a narrow contemporary kitchen and between the southern and western corner rooms is a narrow storeroom.

Walls are painted brick, except the larger eastern corner room which is plastered. Some original doorways are flat-arched. Cornices and other details are absent and the contemporary, plain ceilings are notably lower than in upper storeys. A variety of contemporary services have been fixed to walls and ceilings and in some places penetrate brick walls. One pane of a window on the north-west side has been removed to accommodate computer cabling. Floors are mostly vinyl or carpet; the WC and cleaner's store is ceramic-tiled. The current colour scheme is a relatively simply one based on cream and green.

Annex exterior

The annex is a one-storey rectangular structure at basement level with double hung windows and a hipped slate roof. A front veranda with timber posts and striped corrugated metal roof opens onto small grassed courtyard to the south-west. The external walls are rendered, coursed and painted brick. The outlines of a bricked up archway in the south-western wall are evident.

Annex interior

The interior consists of one large room with timber architraves, skirting, etc. are simple and contemporary, as are the ceiling and cornices. Exterior doors are partly glazed. Lighting is contemporary, as are the ceiling fans. The floors are carpeted and the colour scheme simple and muted.

Ballroom exterior

The Ballroom is a separate Victorian Italianate building connected to the main residence by a covered way roofed in striped, vaulted corrugated metal. The external walls are coursed, rendered and painted brick featuring ornate cornices at ceiling and roof height and parapet walls castellated at the north-western and southwestern sides. At the front (south-western) facade is a Vestibule annex with double timber panelled entrance doors at the north-west and two double-hung windows to the south-west. The main building has two (original) pairs of double-hung windows to the north-west and four (non-original) double-hung windows and a small highly placed central window to the north-east. Behind the parapet walls, Ballroom and Vestibule have metal butterfly roofs falling to a shared central box gutter spilling into a large rainwater head located on the northern external wall. The truncated remains of a chimney on the south-eastern wall are visible from above.

Ballroom interior

The Ballroom interior consists of a large single space with a high, timbered and decorated ceiling including an ornate ceiling rose and highly ornate cornices. The walls are plastered and painted, with a simple picture rail and double-height skirting boards with moulded tops. The fireplace in the chimney breast on the south-eastern wall has been bricked up. Timber floors may be partly original and have been carpeted. The Vestibule has been treated similarly, though the floor finish is vinyl. Two tall arches between the Vestibule and Ballroom spaces have cornices at springing point. Some original ventilation grilles are evident.

=== Modifications and dates ===
- c. 1860 – Construction of existing residence, probably including side annex, by Edmund Thomas Blacket.
- 1870-1876 – Probable addition of Ballroom by Robert Fitz Stubbs
- By 1876 – Addition of the Ballroom and its vestibule, connected to residence by covered way, and (in rear addition) a billiardroom, day nursery and bedroom, detached kitchen, scullery, servants' hall, store, servants' bedroom, laundry and ironing room and 2 servants' bedrooms, and at the rear of the property, a workshop, tool house, two bedrooms, garden-house, carriage house, gighouse, stables, horse-boxes, hay-room, and several out-buildings.
- By 1889 – Construction of apparent semi-detached houses in northern corner of site. Formal subdivision took place in 1904.
- Early 1920s – Adaptation of c.1860 buildings for use as Depot for State Children, including conversion of bedrooms to dormitories, conversion of ballroom to school room, conversion of ballroom rear addition to store; and partial infill of residence front veranda (north end) for office.
- 1925 – Likely demolition of stables. Construction of the Metropolitan Girls' Shelter.
- 1930s-40s – Demolition of rear addition to onetime ballroom.
- 1940s – Construction of new Store and Air Raid Shelter.
- Late 1950s – Construction of School building. Alterations to residence, including: division of Dining Room into bathroom and passage, internal fitout of bathroom, conversion of store to bathroom and bathroom to store, conversion of sitting room to locker room; infill of back veranda, conversion to WCs, blocking up of window and opening, conversion of window to door, removal of internal annex walls to create one space, new windows to side and rear of annex, division of Matron's bedroom into staff dining room with new window and medical room with new sink; conversion of dining room to dormitory with new windows to south-east wall, conversion of ballroom/school to dormitory with new windows to south-east wall, new WC in south corner, vestibule converted to dental examination room with sink, new external door in south-west wall with hood over, modification of doors and partitions at stairs, modifications to existing Matron's WC on stair landing, including installation of shower, division of large dormitory into two staff bedrooms with new window to south-east wall.
- 1960s – Conversion of Store to children's and staff dining facilities.
- Early 1970s – Construction of new classroom building.
- By 1978 – Demolition of all site buildings except residence, annex and ballroom.
- 1980-1983 – Construction of Metropolitan Remand Centre building. Restoration of Bidura House and Ballroom.

== Heritage listing ==
As at 10 March 2017, the Bidura House Group is of state heritage significance as a key point in a broader network of places associated with child welfare and juvenile justice in NSW. It functioned from 1920-1977 as the NSW receiving home, under various names. It is of state historical significance as during this period all wards of the state came to Bidura House before being fostered out or transferred to other institutions. It also functioned between 1920 and the 1940s as accommodation for children on remand awaiting trial in the Metropolitan Children's Court. It is therefore historically and socially significant for its impact on children and their families who were affected by child welfare and juvenile justice systems including the Forgotten Australians and Stolen Generations for a period of almost sixty years. Bidura House Group is also of state significance aesthetically as a good example of Victorian regency design, and via its strong association with prominent NSW architect Edmund Blacket.

Bidura House was listed on the New South Wales State Heritage Register on 28 August 2017 having satisfied the following criteria.

The place is important in demonstrating the course, or pattern, of cultural or natural history in New South Wales.

The Bidura House Group is of historical significance at a state level as a key point in a broader network of places associated with child welfare and juvenile justice in NSW. It functioned from 1920-1977 as child accommodation. During this period all wards of the state came to Bidura House before being fostered out or transferred to other institutions. It also functioned between 1920 and the 1940s as accommodation for children on remand awaiting trial in the Metropolitan Children's Court.

The place has a strong or special association with a person, or group of persons, of importance of cultural or natural history of New South Wales's history.

The building is associated with prominent colonial architect Edmund Thomas Blacket who purchased the site in 1857, built the regency-style residence, Bidura, c.1860 and lived there with his family until 1870.

The site has been occupied by various government child welfare and juvenile justice institutions, including the Depot for State Children, Glebe Girls' Home, Glebe Orphanage, Metropolitan Shelter for Girls, and the Department of Family and Community Services over a period of 96 years. As the first place most children were housed after being removed from their families before their referral to other institutions, this was the place many members of the Forgotten Australians and Stolen Generations entered "care". As such, Bidura has strong associations with these groups.

The site is also associated with mid-20th century feminist movement. In the 1970s, Bidura House, along with Parramatta Girls' Home and Hay Institution for Girls, were targeted by Bessie Guthrie and activists from the Women's Liberation movement for abuses against young women.

The place has a strong or special association with a particular community or cultural group in New South Wales for social, cultural or spiritual reasons.

The precinct is socially significant for its impact on NSW children and their families who were affected by the juvenile justice system including the Forgotten Australians and Stolen Generations. Its importance is indicated by attention given to the site in publications such as the Forgotten Australians Report, the Find & Connect web resource on institutional "care" in Australia, the National Library of Australia's Forgotten Australians and former child migrants oral history project and the Sydney Barani website. It continues to be a focal point for campaigns recognising the history of abuse in child institutions such as the "Loud Fence" Campaign in 2016.

The place has potential to yield information that will contribute to an understanding of the cultural or natural history of New South Wales.

The site is of potential technical significance at a state level as its fabric provides evidence of the conditions experienced in children's homes and remand facilities from the 1920s to the 1980s. The buildings together with descriptions of their former use, provide an insight into the processing, domestic routine and methods employed in the treatment of NSW minors in the state system. Many of the oral histories of former residents describe the routine at these institutions. Evidence of the various alterations and additions undertaken over time reflect changing philosophies and practises such as partitions which show the shift from open dormitories to single rooms at Bidura house.

The place possesses uncommon, rare or endangered aspects of the cultural or natural history of New South Wales.

The site is rare within NSW as a State children's welfare facility which operated continuously from the 1920s to the late 1970s, showing, through its modifications, changing philosophies of child welfare over time.

The place is important in demonstrating the principal characteristics of a class of cultural or natural places/environments in New South Wales.

Though modest in its detailing, the form, design and main elements of Bidura House make it a good example of upper-middle-class Victorian Regency residential architecture. The Ballroom is a simple example of the Victorian Italianate style.

== See also ==
- Australian residential architectural styles
