= Enid Phyllis Wilson =

Australian carillonist and psychologist (1908–1988)

- Born: Enid Phyllis Carpenter; 24 June 1908; Chatswood, New South Wales
- Died: 18 August 1988 (aged 80); Elizabeth Bay, New South Wales
- Education: University of Sydney
- Occupation: psychologist
- Employer: Australian Institute of Industrial Psychology
- Spouse: John Henry Wilson
- Children: a son

Enid Phyllis Wilson born Enid Phyllis Carpenter (24 June 1908 – 18 August 1988) was an Australian carillonist and psychologist. She was the director of the Australian Institute of Industrial Psychology from 1960.

== Life ==
Wilson was born in the Sydney suburb of Chatswood, New South Wales and she was the first of the three children of Catherine Isabella (born Brown) and Arthur Edmund Carpenter. She attended Fort Street Girls' High School before proceeding to the University of Sydney. She lived at The Women's College and she was funded by scholarships. She graduated in 1930 and then went on to claim a master's degree in 1932. She was an outstanding student of psychology and she won the university's medal for the subject and a first class degree. She was able to assist with the work of Alfred Horatio Martin who was a strong advocate for psychometric testing. Martin had founded the Australian Institute of Industrial Psychology in 1927 to help children decide on their best careers.

She married a dental surgeon in London in 1932 while carrying out clinical research directed by Cyril Burt. She also worked with the Scottish psychologist James Drever.

She renewed her association with Alfred Martin and the Australian Institute of Industrial Psychology in 1934. She led the Australian Institute of Industrial Psychology from 1960. Large companies employed her as a consultant.

Her university has a carillon that was unveiled in 1928. It commemorates the nearly 200 students and staff from the university who died during the first world war. It is a substantial instrument. The largest and deepest bell today weighs four and a half tons. Wilson was able to play the carillon operating the keyboard to make bells ring and in 1932 she was promoted from assistant to honorary carillonist. She visited the Mechelen Carillon School in Belgium to find out more about playing the instrument. She was playing it in the 1950s and in the 2020s the university's carillon is still played once a week.

Wilson died a widow in 1988 in the Sydney suburb of Elizabeth Bay.
