= The Colonial Observer =

Former New South Wales newspaper

Front page, The Colonial Observer, Thursday, 28 October 1841

The Colonial Observer was an English language newspaper published in Sydney, Australia during the early 1840s.

== History ==
The paper was published from Thursday, 7 October 1841, until Thursday, 26 December 1844.

The first editorial of the paper outlined its purpose as advocating "the grand doctrines of the Protestant reformation, those doctrines that are held in common by all denominations of Evangelical Protestants". The editors considered the Papal system "a monstrous perversion of Christianity" and an obstacle to "the political advancement and general welfare of any country", vowing to oppose it at all turns. The newspaper also advocated "the exclusive appropriation of Protestant funds to the encouragement and promotion of protestant immigration".

== Digitisation ==
The Colonial Observer has been digitised as part of the Australian Newspapers Digitisation Program by the National Library of Australia.

== See also ==
- List of newspapers in New South Wales
