= 1848 New South Wales colonial election =

Colonial election for New South Wales, Australia in 1848

| ← 1843 | 29 July 1848 – 2 August 1848 | 1851 → |

24 seats in the New South Wales Legislative Council
- Results of the election, showing winners in each seat. Seats without circles indicate the electorate returned one member.

The 1848 New South Wales colonial election was held between 29 July and 2 August 1848. This election was for 24 seats in the New South Wales Legislative Council and it was conducted in 15 single-member constituencies, two 2-member constituencies and one 5-member constituency, all with a first past the post system. The Legislative Council was a hybrid system with 36 members, 24 elected, 6 appointed by virtue of their office (Colonial Secretary, Colonial Treasurer, Auditor-General, Attorney General, Commander of the forces and Collector of Customs) and 6 nominated. The appointments and elections were for five year terms.

The right to vote was limited to men aged over 21 who owned property worth at least £200 or occupied a house at £20 per year. There was a higher requirement to be a member of the Council, owning property worth £2,000 or income from real estate of £100 per year. If a man fulfilled these requirements in multiple constituencies, then he was allowed to cast a vote in each. This was known as plural voting.

Settlers of the Port Phillip District had wanted representation in the New South Wales Legislative Council for some time, achieving 6 representatives from 1843, "But the colonists were not satisfied with government from and by Sydney". The campaign for independence for the district saw Earl Grey elected as the member for City of Melbourne. Earl Grey, the Colonial Secretary in London, had never set foot in the colony and there was no suggestion he met the property requirement for election. A different tactic was adopted for the 5 member Port Phillip, with no candidates nominated on 27 July, and a fresh writ was issued on 25 August for an election on 3 October.

== Key dates ==
| Date | Event |
|---|---|
| 25 to 27 July 1848 | Nominations for candidates for the election. |
| 29 July and 2 August 1848 | Polling days. |
| 15 May 1849 | Opening of Legislative Council. |

== Results ==
New South Wales colonial election, 29 July 1848 – 2 August 1848 Legislative Council << 1843–1851 >>
| Enrolled voters | | | | | |
| Votes cast | 8,887 | | Turnout | | |
| Informal votes | 0 | | Informal | 0.00 | |
Summary of votes by party
| Party | Primary votes | % | Swing | Seats | Change |
| Total | 8,887 | | | 24 | |

== See also ==
- Members of the New South Wales Legislative Council, 1843–1851
- Results of the 1848 New South Wales colonial election
