= Theatre Organ Society of Australia =

- Formation: 1960
- Type: Non-profit organization
- Purpose: Preservation and promotion of theatre pipe organs, and related music.
- Region served: Australia
- Website: tosa.net.au

The Theatre Organ Society of Australia (TOSA) is an Australian non-profit organisation that promotes the preservation and presentation of theatre organs. Each state has its own division, which is a free-standing and independent body.

== History ==
After the silent film era ended and many theatre organs were getting scrapped, small groups of enthusiasts in the USA and the UK got together to try to preserve what they could of the remaining instruments, to save their legacy. Various societies formed during the 1960s and still function today, based in Brisbane, Sydney, Canberra, Melbourne, Hobart, Adelaide and Perth. Additional groups, although not considered formal "divisions", also share knowledge, experience and other functions in preserving and presenting theatre pipe organs across Australia.

Rod Blackmore, the longest-serving member of the society's NSW division, edited its journal, The Diaphone, from 1963 until its cessation with Vol 7, No 4 (Nov 1969).

== Current activities ==
Throughout the year, many concerts and other activities are sponsored by TOSA, and promoted through their website at tosa.net.au

== Instruments ==
- List of Theatre Organs in Australia
- TOSA-owned organs
- TOSA Q - Kelvin Grove, Brisbane - The Christie Cinema Pipe Organ

== See also ==
- American Theatre Organ Society
- Cinema Organ Society
- Theatre Organ Society International
