= Theatre Organ Society International =

- Formation: 2007
- Dissolved: 2014
- Type: Non-profit organization
- Purpose: To promote and present theatre organ performance as an internationally recognized art form.
- President: Fr. Gus Franklin
- Main organ: Board of Directors
- Website: Official Website

The Theatre Organ Society International (TOSI) was a nonprofit organization, dedicated to promoting and presenting the theatre organ performance as an internationally recognized art form.

The organization existed from 2007 to 2014.

The mission of TOSI was to help promote theatre organ performance as a popular entertainment icon, thereby providing a unique musical experience.

== History ==
Around February 2006, personality issues began to surface within the American Theatre Organ Society (ATOS) which were causing some unrest among key members within ATOS. By July 2006 even more unrest within ATOS and in August there was what has been referred to as a "Mass Resignation". Bob Davidson, Jack Moelmann, Fr. Gus Franklin, Dan Bellomy, Russell Holmes, and Nelson Page were among those resigning key positions or membership within the ATOS organization.

The Theatre Organ Society International (TOSI) began with a planning meeting in the New Jersey area September 29–30, 2006, with Dan Bellomy, Nelson Page, Bob Davidson, Russell Holmes, and Diane Walker attending. Their purpose was to form a group which would present the theatre organ in a different way than the American Theatre Organ Society (ATOS) or any other organization for that matter. Fr. Gus Franklin and Jack Moelmann were urged to join the group but they both felt that TOSI was being formed in retaliation against ATOS and they didn't want to be a part of it since both were still active and supportive of ATOS even though they had resigned from their official roles in the organization, Fr. Gus as Past President and Jack Moelmann as Secretary.

It was decided that TOSI would become a corporation registered in the State of Delaware for its ease in obtaining that status. No attempt would be made at this time to make it a non-profit organization but that could follow sometime down the road.

The Founders of TOSI were known as the “Council” as opposed to being a Board of Directors. There would be a Board of Directors but the Council would be the organization’s foundation and exist without term limits. Fr. Gus and Jack were finally convinced to join the group on the condition that TOSI would not exist as a competing organization to ATOS. That was agreed by the Council, and Jack and Fr. Gus immediately began crafting bylaws for the organization while the preliminary actions of incorporation were being implemented by Nelson Page.

Officers were appointed: President: Fr. Gus Franklin; Vice-President: Carlo Curley until November 2007 when he began to serve as Honorary Vice President and John Ledwon was named Vice-President; Secretary: Jack Moelmann; Treasurer: Bob Miloche.

The Bylaws were developed using the content and format of those for ATOS. They were first approved February 10, 2007. They began with following purpose statement:

This Society is a Corporation formed under the laws of the State of Delaware. It is for public and charitable purposes, and not for the private gain of any person. The public purposes shall include:

a. To preserve and promote the theatre organ and its art form; b. To further public appreciation of the theatre organ and its music with concerts and educational programs; c. To encourage talented musicians to preserve the art of theatre organ playing.

A mission statement was developed as follows:

Theatre Organ Society International (TOSI) is a membership organization for public and charitable purposes whose aim is to promote and present theatre organ performance as an internationally recognized art form.

== Ending ==
In 2014, a notice was published on the organization's website, which announced the closing of the organization. It read, in part, "The TOSI Board of Directors reluctantly and with heavy hearts voted unanimously to close our doors to any and all new and renewing members and to dissolve TOSI as a legally recognized organization last February. Any attempt to enumerate the precise reasons for this action would be mere speculation. The time simply had come to do this."

It went on to announce that the remaining assets of the group would be used to create three annual scholarships for young organists, to be awarded to the annual winner of the ATOS Young Theatre Organist Competition for the following three years.

The announcement concluded by saying, "While we are no longer an officially recognized body in any state, we are still a group of great friends and we still have a mission. For a while, we did what we intended to do to fulfill our mission; this scholarship will allow us to continue to do some of that for a few more years." Following this, a detailed article about the organization's history was included, written by Jack Moelmann. It ended by saying "This concludes the background and history of the Theatre Organ Society International (TOSI). In its nine years of existence, did it make a difference? Only time will tell! It did live up to its expectations with a variety of unique programs. Many people supported its purpose and its activities. Will another organization like this come again? Who knows!"

== See also ==
- Cinema Organ Society
- American Theatre Organ Society
