= Cinema Organ Society =

- Formation: 1952
- Type: Non-profit organization
- Purpose: To promote high standards of theatre organ performance, presentation and technical skill.
- Region served: United Kingdom
- President: John Mann
- Main organ: General Committee
- Website: Official Website

The Cinema Organ Society (COS) was founded in 1952 by Hubert Selby and Tony Moss for those interested in organ music as entertainment.

It is for everyone interested in organ music as entertainment, with the emphasis on the cinema or theatre organ.

The COS is organised into a number of districts around the UK, each with its own 'adopted' cinema organ.

- Northern District Wurlitzer, Victoria Hall, Saltaire. Originally installed in the Gaumont Cinema, Oldham, Lancashire, 1937. 3 Manuals, 11 Ranks + Midi Piano
- Midlands & Wales District Compton, Hampton-in-Arden, Fentham Hall. Originally installed in the Tower Cinema, West Bromwich. 3 Manuals, 11 Ranks, Melotone, Digital Piano
- Southern District maintains the largest Wurlitzer ever imported to Europe from the US. Now fully restored and installed in Troxy, East London, it was originally installed in the Trocadero, Elephant & Castle, London. 4 Manuals, 25 Ranks, Piano

Northern District Wurlitzer	Midlands and Wales District Compton	Southern District Troxy Wurlitzer

== See also ==
- Wurlitzers in the United Kingdom
- American Theatre Organ Society
- Theatre Organ Society International
