= American Theatre Organ Society =

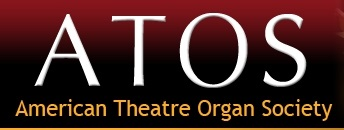
- Formation: 1955
- Type: Non-profit organization
- Purpose: Preservation and promotion of theatre pipe organs, and related music
- Region served: Worldwide, primarily USA
- Chairman: Taylor Trimby
- Website: Official website

The American Theatre Organ Society (ATOS) is an American non-profit organization, dedicated to preserving and promoting the theatre pipe organ and its musical art form.

ATOS consists of regional member-chapters, and is led by democratically elected leaders. There are currently over 75 local chapters of ATOS, and membership is made up of musicians, technicians, hobbyists, educators, and others who enjoy the music of the theatre organ. The ATOS Board of Directors is the main governing body.

== History ==
ATOS was founded as a group called the American Theatre Organ Enthusiasts by Richard Simonton. He was a Hollywood businessman, and entrepreneur. He arranged a gathering at his home on February 8, 1955, where he and several other organ enthusiasts founded what would later become ATOS.

== Current activities ==
ATOS hosts an annual convention, held at various locations across the country. ATOS has outreach to young musicians, and funds several musical scholarships for youth members. It also sponsors an annual Young Theatre Organist Competition.

ATOS sponsors ATOS Theatre Organ Radio, an internet radio station dedicated to the theatre organ. It can be streamed through the ATOS website 24 hours per day.

== See also ==
- Cinema Organ Society
- Theatre Organ Society of Australia
- Theatre Organ Society International
- Organ Historical Society
- American Guild of Organists
- Theatre Historical Society of America
- Richard Simonton
