= Odeon Star Semaphore Cinemas =

Cinema in Adelaide, South Australia

Coordinates: 34°50′19″S 138°29′05″E

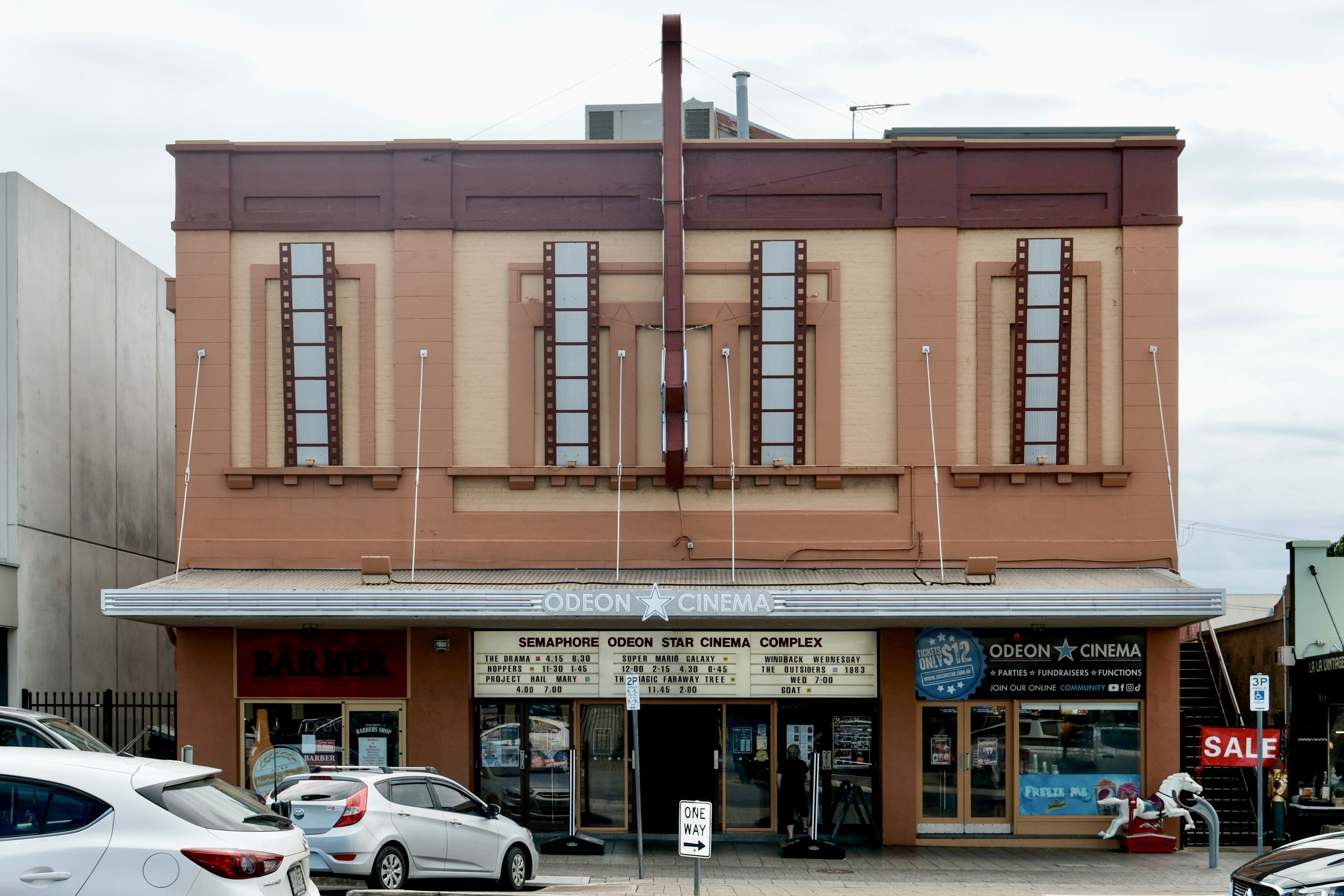
The cinema in 2026

The Odeon Star Semaphore Cinemas, usually referred to as the Odeon Star, is an independent multiplex cinema in the beachside Adelaide suburb of Semaphore, South Australia. It is the oldest purpose-built cinema in Adelaide, opened on 22 May 1920 as the Wondergraph Picture Palace.

== History ==
=== Picturedrome ===
In September 1910, before there were any indoor picture theatres in Semaphore, the Continental Wondergraph Company bought land on the esplanade, intending to establish a tea garden and open-air cinema. On Monday 26 December, Wondergraph gave the inaugural screening at its "Picturedrome", although the construction of the kiosk and tea garden had been delayed. The seating faced the sea, and several silent films were projected onto a solid concrete "silver wall", a new technology claimed to have been brought to Australia by the European company.

In winter, the Greater Wondergraph Company (formed in Adelaide in 1911) showed films at the Semaphore Town Hall, which was referred to as the Semaphore Wondergraph. In July 1912, a film of the British Antarctic Expedition led by Captain Scott was shown at the Semaphore Wondergraph. Competitor Ozone Theatres also used the town hall for showing films in the winter months.

A scheme to enclose the Picturedrome was advertised in November 1914, but this was apparently not concluded. Films were last advertised as being shown there at the end of summer in March 1915.

In December 1917, an advertisement refers to the "Semaphore Wondergraph Residential Cafe", right opposite the beach, for short stays.

The Picturedrome, which seated 1,000 patrons, was adjacent to the Customs Boarding Station, which still stands today, on the corner of the Esplanade and Semaphore Road.

=== New indoor cinema ===
In 1920, Wondergraph had a "palatial" new indoor cinema built on Semaphore Road, to cater for the people of the Lefevre Peninsula in winter. The magnificently fitted out building was designed by prominent South Australian architect Eric Habershon McMichael (Note: McMichael also designed the Wakefield Street Private Hospital, among other notable buildings.) and built by Messrs. Emmett Brothers. By this time the trams were running to Port Adelaide. The theatre opened on Saturday 22 May 1920 with the screening of the 1920 American silent comedy film What's Your Husband Doing?. It had a seating capacity of 1,246 in orchestra and balcony levels, described at the time as "palatial".

In September 1920 Dan Clifford bought Wondergraph's suburban circuit, including the Wondergraph Semaphore, which cost him £15,000. In 1921 the freehold was transferred to Clifford, and then in November 1923 to his company, D. Clifford Theatres Ltd. A vaudeville troupe known as The Dandies performed at the Wondergraph before its name change.

It was renamed Star Theatre in 1930 (like most other cinemas in the Clifford Theatre Circuit), and in January 1931, sound equipment was installed to cater for talkies, in order to compete with the Semaphore Ozone Theatre. No, No Nanette was screened as the inaugural talkie at the cinema.

After a takeover by Greater Union Cinemas in 1946 it was extensively refurbished or rebuilt, and was reopened as the Odeon Star on 12 June 1952. It was still owned by Clifford Theatres at this point.

With the beginning of the TV era in 1959, attendances declined, and the cinema eventually closed on 13 November 1976, and the building converted into a furniture shop.

After a few changes of hands and function, it was renovated and restored to its original purpose, and has continued to operate as the Odeon Star since December 1991. It was reopened as the Odeon Star on 19 December 1991, initially with only circle seating, accommodating 320 patrons, while the stalls area continued as "Hoff's Secondhand Emporium" until 1997. It was once again refurbished in 1997, becoming a three-screen cinema and (seating 300, 150 and 140). It was part of the Wallis Cinemas chain for some time, but by 2009 was being run by independent operators, then Terry, Jacky and Joe Proud. The Prouds put it up for sale in November 2018.

The Odeon Star celebrated its 100th anniversary on 22 May 2020.

== Today ==
As of December 2022 the Odeon Star shows new release mainstream and arthouse films, charging A$12 for any session, any day.

It is also one of several venues for the Adelaide Film Festival in October each year.
