= Wallis Cinemas =

Australian cinema chain

Wallis Cinemas, formerly Wallis Theatres, is a family-owned South Australian company that operates cinema complexes in greater Adelaide and regional South Australia.

== Company history ==
This family-owned company was established as Wallis Theatres by its founder, Hugh Wallis, in December 1953, with the opening of the Blueline drive-in at West Beach. Wallis gave up a refrigeration business to move into the cinema industry.

In 1991, Hugh's son Bob Wallis bought the Barr Smith home, Auchendarroch House, at Mount Barker, and restored it, including adding a tavern and a seven-screen cinema complex.

Hugh Wallis died in 1994, and Bob, then general manager, took over the business.

Bob Wallis died in 2007, and his wife Lorna and their daughter Michelle, and granddaughter Deanna continued to run the business.

In 2005, Wallis Theatres changed their branding for all public advertising purposes to "Wallis Cinemas". Officially, however, the company was still known as Wallis Theatres. This changed in late 2007 when officially it was changed to the new name Wallis Cinemas.

== Drive-ins ==
The Blueline was the state's first drive-in theatre, and the second in the country. It was established on a 40-acre (16 ha) plot purchased from Adelaide Airport. Wallis Theatres expanded rapidly, opening drive-ins throughout South Australia over the next decade. The company operated the following drive-ins in Adelaide:

- Blueline, West Beach
- Oceanline, Christies Beach
- Mainline, Gepps Cross
- Parkline, Mitchell Park
- Valleyline, St Agnes
- Harbourline, Outer Harbour
- Hi-line, Panorama
- Hollywood, Salisbury Downs

Wallis Theatres also catered for country South Australia, with drive-in theatres established in the Riverland, Barossa Valley and mid-north. Wallis' six country drive-ins were:

- Bonneyline, Barmera
- Murrayline, Berri
- Northline, Clare
- Riverline, Loxton
- Groveline, Renmark
- Barossaline, Tanunda

Wallis Theatres had closed and sold most of their country and suburban drive-ins by the early 1990s. Of their remaining drive-in locations, the Blueline closed in November 1998 and the Valleyline in May 2003.

However, Wallis continued to operate the Mainline Drive-in as the last surviving drive-in theatre in Adelaide. In November 2021, Wallis announced the closure of Mainline in early 2022.

== Cinemas ==
=== Glenelg Cinema Centre ===
The Ozone Theatre in Glenelg, designed by Kenneth Milne (who was also responsible for the 1940–41 major refurbishment of the), opened on 25 November 1937, with seating for up to 1,920 patrons. The Waterman family owned Ozone Theatres Ltd.

In February 1945, the Ozone was ranked second in terms of size among Adelaide suburban cinemas, with a seating capacity of 1,853; the largest was the Star Theatre / Hindmarsh Town Hall, part of the Clifford Cinema Circuit, with a seating capacity of 2,012.

In 1951, the cinema was being operated by Hoyts-Ozone Theatres Ltd., and remained as a single-screen cinema until 1971, when Wallis acquired it. Wallis transformed it into South Australia's first multi-screen cinema, and renamed it the Glenelg Cinema Centre. A third screen was added to the two screens in 1978.

On 1 February 2009, Wallis gave a free screening of Gone with the Wind, before closing the cinema. It was demolished in mid-2011.

The Ozone Glenelg was featured in a photographic exhibition called Now Showing... Cinema Architecture in South Australia, held at the Hawke Centre's Kerry Packer Civic Gallery in April/May 2024.

=== Chelsea/Regal ===
Wallis Theatres saved the Chelsea Cinema at Kensington Park from demolition, after taking over the lease from 1 January 1971. This cinema is now heritage-listed and owned by the City of Burnside.

=== Academy Cinema City ===
The company's growth continued when Wallis purchased a warehouse in Hindmarsh Square, Adelaide, and converted it into a twin cinema in 1976. A further three screens were added in 1980, and the complex was named Academy Cinema City.

In 2007, the Academy Cinema City complex was closed. It was demolished in 2007 and redeveloped into a serviced apartment and hotel complex.

=== Piccadilly ===
Bob Wallis purchased the single-screen Forum Cinema at North Adelaide in 1983, after it had closed in February of that year, to save it from demolition. This building was redeveloped into the three-screen Piccadilly Cinemas in 1989–90, although the company sought to maintain the heritage and architecture of the building, and had another major refurbishment in 2022.

=== Oxford Cinema ===
The company closed their single-screen Oxford Cinema in Unley Town Hall in 2001.

=== Noarlunga, Mt Barker, Mitcham ===
The company built and opened the five-screen Noarlunga Cinema Centre in 1991, next to the Colonnades shopping centre; the Mount Barker Cinemas in 2003; and the Mitcham Cinemas in 2007.

== Present locations ==
As of July 2026, Wallis Cinemas owns the following cinemas:

- Glenelg
- Mildura
- Mitcham Cinemas at Mitcham Square Shopping Centre (7 screens)
- Mount Barker Cinemas (7 screens)
- Mount Barker Outdoor
- Noarlunga Cinema Centre (5 screens)
- Piccadilly Cinemas, North Adelaide (3 screens; refurbished 2022)

== Other activities ==
Wallis also provides services to independent cinema operators in Australia & New Zealand (including the Capri Theatre at Goodwood, and Victa Cinemas at Victor Harbor), such as programming.

== Auchendarroch House ==
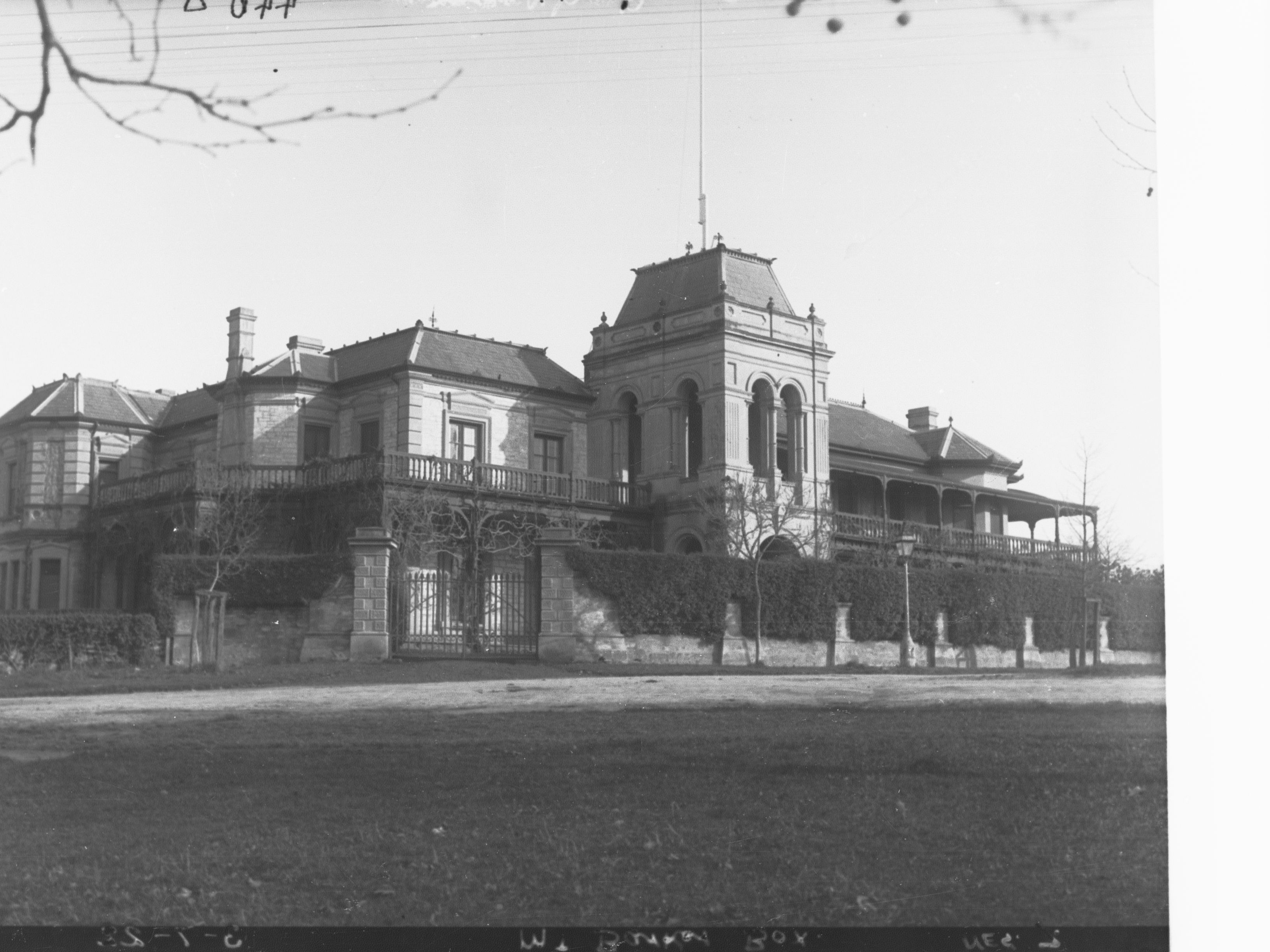
Auchendarroch House

Wallis Theatres owns and operates Auchendarroch House and the Wallis Tavern, both located at Mount Barker adjacent to Wallis' cinema complex.

In 1878, Robert Barr Smith and his wife Joanna (sister of Sir Thomas Elder), both Scottish immigrants to the colony of South Australia, paid £3000 for a piece of land in Mount Barker that included the Oakfield Hotel (opened 1860, owned by Lachlan MacFarlane). They planned and built a 30-roomed mansion in French Renaissance style around the existing hotel, to be used as their family's summer home, with the architect J. H. Grainger. They later assigned the name Auchendarroch, from the Scottish Gaelic word for "holy place of the oaks", and planted a lot of oak trees on the property. They assigned 3 acres (1.2 ha) each for an orchard and a garden, with hedges planted around the whole property. The garden included large lawns and many English trees, including cedars, chestnuts, maples, conifers, and around 50 oak trees. It also had flower beds and vegetable gardens, with the produce given away in the community.

Robert died in 1915, followed by Joanna in 1919, and the house was sold in 1921 to the Memorial Hospital and used as a convalescent home. It was also used as an air force hospital. In 1976 the government sold the house and plots of land off separately.

Hugh Wallis bought the house, surrounding gardens, and additional land in 2000, and his daughter Michelle set about restoring both house and garden, with the help of experts. The home was converted into a function centre.

== See also ==
- D. Clifford Theatres
- Greater Union - competitor
- Hoyts - competitor
- Reading Cinemas - competitor

South Australian cinema articles

- Capri Theatre
- Mercury Cinema
- Odeon Semaphore
- Piccadilly Cinema
- Regal Theatre, Adelaide
- South Australian Film Corporation
