= Wondergraph =

Early 20th C Australian cinema chain

Wondergraph, Wondergraph Theatre and variations were names given first to a technology, and then to picture theatres run first by the Continental Wondergraph Company (represented by two German men who arrived in Perth, Western Australia, in 1910); and then, in Adelaide, South Australia, by the Wondergraph Company (1910–1911), and then the Greater Wondergraph Company, established around 1911 and in existence until 1939.

The Continental Wondergraph Company was registered in Perth in early 1910, and later that year set up an open-air cinema in Semaphore. This was followed in 1911 by the Wondergraph Theatre, an indoor picture theatre in Goodwood.

The Greater Wondergraph Company was established in Adelaide around 1911 by a group of South Australian men led by Mandel Finkelstein, who built the first Wondergraph picture theatre in Hindley Street in 1912–13, and over time built a cinema chain in the city and suburbs. In September 1920 Dan Clifford bought some of Wondergraph's suburban cinemas. The Greater Wondergraph Company finally went into liquidation in 1942, after selling their remaining interests to S.A. Theatres in 1939.

== Company history ==
=== November 1909: arrival in Perth ===
The Continental Wondergraph Company is first mentioned in newspapers in Australia on 10 November 1909 in Perth, Western Australia, when they announced the presentation at the Theatre Royal, for the first time in Australia, a new technology, "claimed to be the latest development of animated art. The pictures, which are presented on a silver wall instead of on a linen screen, are, it is stated, greatly intensified, and presented more clearly and more distinctly in their every outline. Three different apparatus are said to be utilised to produce the remarkable mechanical and artistic effects. The Wondergraph is declared to be a perfected cinematograph and phonograph combined, and differs from all other shows of the kind in that the dramatic dancing and singing pictures are presented not in a dark, but in a lighted room". It was the company's intention to have a limited season in Perth before proceeding to the eastern states.

A Mr K. Luttgens was the director, and Mr T. Baar the general manager, and both arrived in the "Koningen Louise" (probably SS Königin Luise) on 8 November 1909. A later court case revealed that there were six partners in the firm when they came out from Germany, including W. H. Bruce in Australia.

In January 1910 Wondergraph gave exhibitions in Kalgoorlie. In March 1910 the "Continental Wondergraph Company, Ltd., of £1,250, in 25 shares of £50 each" was registered at the Supreme Court of Western Australia, with an office at 11 William Street, Perth.

At some point the partnership with W. H. Bruce was dissolved in Western Australia, in an agreement whereby Bruce took 140 films to Adelaide and 70 to Broken Hill, New South Wales. In April 1910, at a scheduled showing of Wondergraph films in Broken Hill by Bruce, "much disappointment was expressed at the non-appearance of the 'Wondergraph Talking and Singing Machine'", owing to the failure of a piece of equipment. In Adelaide in June 1910, Bruce sued the Continental Wondergraph company for breach of contract. The parties agreed to a settlement whereby Bruce was paid £50. In July 1910, Bruce was showing "Bruce's pictures in the suburbs", with screenings at Unley and Semaphore, and as late as July 1912 Bruce was showing films at the Lyric Theatre in Grote Street.

=== May 1910: Adelaide ===
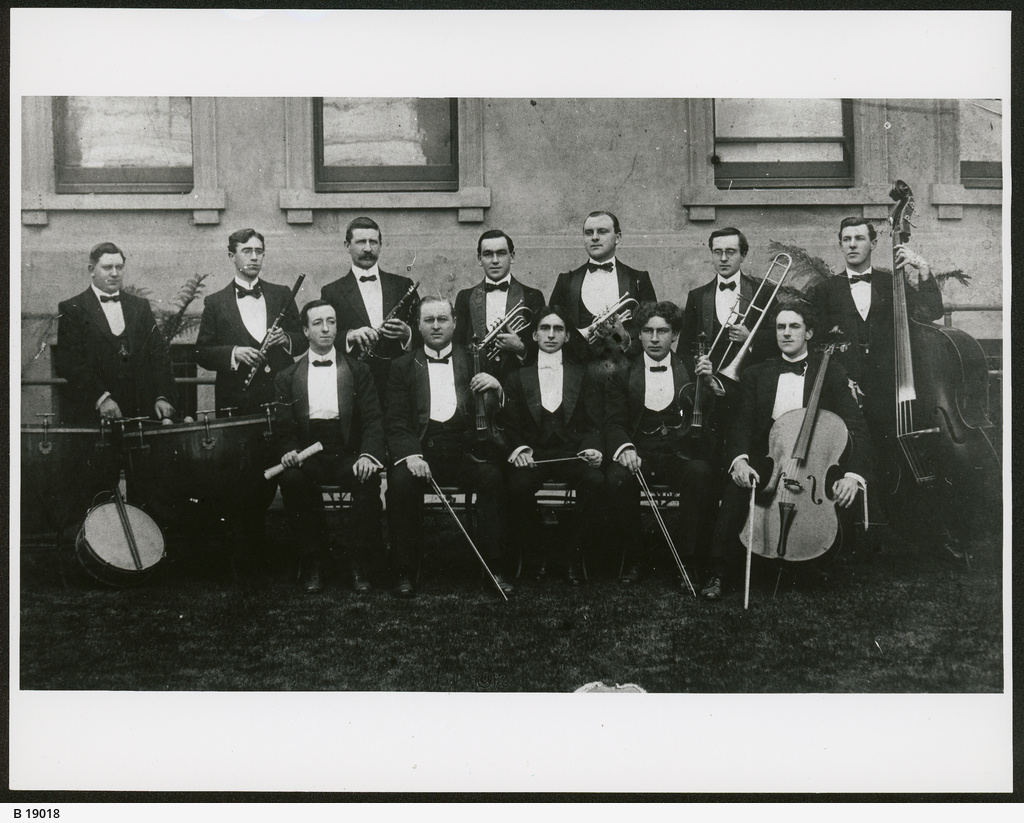
Wiliiam Richard Cade's orchestra which used to play at the Wondergraph Theatre, 1912.

On Saturday 14 May 1910, Luttgens and Baar began a seven-night season of screenings at the Adelaide Town Hall, using "finest and best process extant", including a technique known as "Fata Morgana", (Note: Fata Morgana refers to an optical illusion.) showing moving pictures in colour, accompanied by a full theatre orchestra. The same show was then given at Port Adelaide in the following week. They continued to give showings at the Port Adelaide Town Hall every Friday night in June 1910.

In September 1910, Mendel Finkelstein (c.1878–1949 (Note: He was "brother of well-known theatrical personality Phil Finkelstein".)) was selling "a large quantity of surplus outfit from the Continental Wondergraph Company", including projectors and many films, from his company at Bank Street, Adelaide. A couple of days later, he posted an ad saying "WANTED, Building Site, Port Adelaide, suitable for Picture Hall, or a suitable Building... Full particulars to Wondergraph Company, c/o Finkelstein & Co., Bank-street". In October 1910, the abridged prospectus for a new company was published, being Wondergraph Limited, with capital of £8,000, to be divided into 150 shares of £20 each. The directors were M. Finkelstein, C. B. Ware, W. O. McAulay, J. M. Hinton, and one other, to be elected at the first meeting. This new company was created to take over from Finkelstein all his rights and assets in the Continental Wondergraph Company, including the patents for the "Silver Wall" and "Fata Morgana" technologies, and also sites at Semaphore and Glenelg, with the intention of constructing a "Plcturedrome" and tea garden on these sites and elsewhere. It was also intended to build new halls for showing films and other entertainments. The company proved a great success showing movies at the Adelaide Town Hall, which soon proved too small to accommodate the demand for the new "moving pictures".

In July 1911, a prospectus for a new company, the Greater Wondergraph Company, was published, with Capital of £50,000, divided into 50,000 Shares of £1 each. The directors of this company were Finkelstein, Charles Boxer Ware, and three more to be elected. The purpose of this new company was "to acquire and take over from the present Company, Wondergraph Limited" and to have the option to purchase part of Town Acre 673 on Hindley Street, opposite the Theatre Royal, on which they would demolish the present buildings and build a new modern picture theatre. It would also acquire the name and the two new technologies associated with the former Wondergraph company, which had showed a profit on its paid-up capital of 140%. The company held its first half-yearly meeting in February 2012. The company was floated, raising enough money to build the Wondergraph (later Civic) Theatre in Hindley Street in 1912.

On Saturday 2 December 1911, Wondergraph opened its new "Picture Pavilion" opposite the Exhibition Building on North Terrace, a seated outdoor picture theatre, with its screen made of "reinforced concrete and covered with a patent cement" (the "silver wall" technology mentioned above), the largest of its type in the country. A full orchestra would accompany the short film, A Doll's House, based on Ibsen's play and starring Marie Eline, William Russell and Marguerite Snow. The venue continued to operate for several years until at least 1919, lending itself to other uses as well.

Around the time the group bought the York Theatre in Rundle Street (c. 1920?), Nat Solomons succeeded Edward Povey as chairman of the board. Solomons (1858–1943) was a London-born tobacco merchant, who later served as alderman and then mayor of the Kensington and Norwood Council.

=== 1920: acquisitions by Clifford ===
In September 1920 Dan Clifford bought Wondergraph's suburban circuit, which included cinemas at Unley, Goodwood, and Semaphore.

Nat Solomons was still chairman of Greater Wondergraph in December 1924.

In October 1936, there were two cinemas in Semaphore: the Semaphore Cinema, run by Ozone Theatres, and the Wondergraph Semaphore, which had retained its name despite then being operated by the Star (Clifford) circuit.

=== 1938–9: sale to S.A. Theatres ===
In January 1937 Solomons was still chairman, although had just been ill for 10 weeks.

After striking a deal worth £200,000 with S.A. Theatres (a subsidiary of Ozone Theatres, owned by the Watermans), in March 1938, the Greater Wonderaph Company sold its assets to the company, including the Civic and York Theatres in the city, as well as the Wondergraph theatres at Unley and Goodwood (for some time called the Star, while under D. Clifford Theatres). In September 1939, the sale was effected, with Wondergraph distributing the proceeds among its shareholders. The company finally went into liquidation in late 1942.

In August 1947, S.A. Theatres sold the Civic Theatre to Greater Union, who were leasing the theatre at the time.

== Theatres ==
=== Semaphore ===
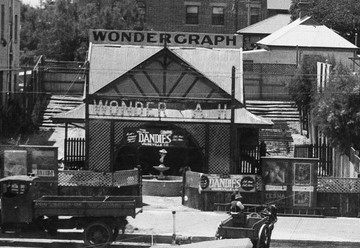
Wondergraph Theatre, Semaphore (c.1930)

Various cinemas were operated by the Continental Wondergraph Company and the Greater Wondergraph company in the seaside town (now a suburb) of Semaphore.

The Continental Wondergraph Company bought land at Semaphore in September 1910, intending to establish a tea garden and open-air cinema. On Monday 26 December, the Wondergraph company gave the inaugural screening at its "Picturedrome". Situated on the esplanade, the seating faced the sea, and although the construction of the kiosk and tea garden had been delayed, the screening went ahead. Several silent films were projected onto a solid concrete "silver wall" by "a new invention which enables the subjects to be shown without flicker or glare". The Picturedrome, which seated 1,000 patrons, was adjacent to the Customs Boarding Station, which still stands today, on the corner of the Esplanade and Semaphore Road. It was also referred to as the Semaphore Wondergraph.

A scheme to enclose the Picturedrome was advertised in November 1914, but this was apparently not concluded. Films were last advertised as being shown there at the end of summer in March 1915. In December 1917, an advertisement refers to the "Semaphore Wondergraph Residential Cafe", right opposite the beach, for short stays.

The Greater Wondergraph Company (formed in Adelaide in 1911) started showing films at the Semaphore Town Hall by mid-1912, which was also referred to as the Semaphore Wondergraph. In July 1912, a film of the British Antarctic Expedition led by Captain Scott was shown at this Semaphore Wondergraph.

==== The Odeon Star ====
In 1920, the Greater Wondergraph Company had a "palatial" new indoor cinema built on Semaphore Road, Semaphore. This would cater for the people of the Lefevre Peninsula in winter. The magnificently fitted out building was designed by prominent South Australian architect Eric McMichael and built by Messrs. Emmett Brothers. By this time the trams were running to Port Adelaide. The theatre opened on Saturday 22 May with the screening of the 1920 American silent comedy film What's Your Husband Doing?. In September 1920 Dan Clifford bought Wondergraph's suburban circuit, including the Wondergraph Semaphore, which cost him £15,000. In 1921 the freehold was transferred to Clifford, and then in November 1923 to his company, D. Clifford Theatres Ltd. A vaudeville troupe known as The Dandies performed at the Wondergraph before its name change. The Semaphore Wondergraph was renamed Star Theatre in 1930, and converted to catering for talkies on 24 January 1931. In 1952 it was extensively refurbished and reopened as the Odeon Star. The Odeon Star closed on 13 November 1976, but after a few changes of hands and function, it was restored to its original purpose and has continued to operate as the Odeon Star since December 1991.

=== Goodwood ===
The Wondergraph Theatre in Goodwood opened on 3 November 1911, and still stands two doors down from the present Capri Theatre.

It was acquired by the Clifford Theatre Circuit in September 1920, along with Wondergraph's other suburban cinemas. It was renamed Star Theatre from November 1920 until October/November 1942.

The cinema later passed back into Wondergraph hands, resuming its old name.

On 8 October 1941, the Clifford circuit opened the New Star Theatre a few doors to the north, and the old Star was sold to Ozone Theatres. The cinema was renamed Ozone Theatre when it was operated by the Waterman family, who owned Ozone Theatres Ltd (that also operated Ozone Marryatville and others). It was called the Ozone until at least November 1946. It was again briefly operated by Clifford Theatres, but the owners and operators are unclear for a period in the 1940s and 1950s. It was renamed the Curzon in 1955 and was leased until its closure on 20 February 1964.

=== Hindley Street ===
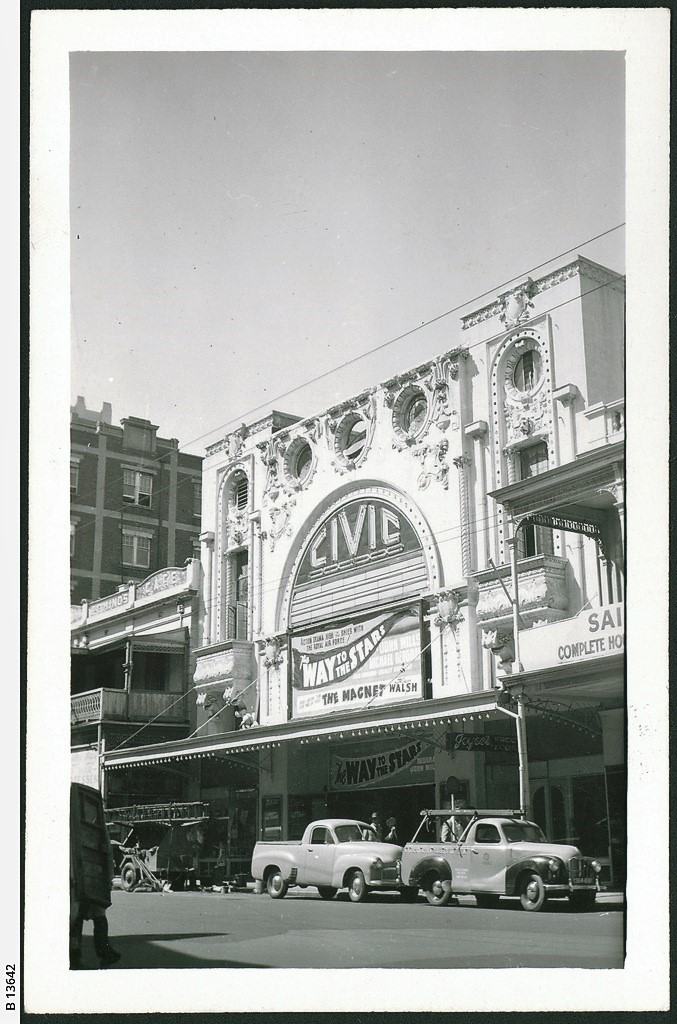
Civic Theatre, 1956 (formerly the Wondergraph)

The new Wondergraph picture theatre in Hindley Street, situated opposite the Theatre Royal, was built by the Greater Wondergraph Company from July 1912. Designed by Garlick & Jackman architects, the design of the building was being lauded well before construction. The theatre, which had a stalls entrance in Peel Street, had a seating capacity of 1,800, and was possibly the most opulent so far seen in Adelaide. It cost nearly £60,000 to build. The screen was 32 ft (9.8 m) by 24 ft (7.3 m), and the building's facade was based on a "Temple of Dreams" design. (Note: Probably referring to prints by artist Herbert Crowley – compare.) The theatre housed possibly Adelaide's third theatre organ (which was in 1917 removed to Glenelg's Seaview Theatre), and could accommodate an orchestra of 60 musicians.

At the invitation-only event on the night before its official opening night on Friday 5 September 1913, "every seat was occupied by the audience, which went into raptures over the fine appointments of the theatre and the pictures which were shown". The main feature was The Crossing Policeman. (Note: Article says it was called Crossing a Policeman, but it is evidently this one.)

The theatre was variously referred to as the New Wondergraph or simply the Wondergraph, with the company known as Wondergraph Pictures. In November 1913, the management was commended for being able to show film of the Melbourne Cup less than 24 hours after the race was run in Melbourne, over 500 mi (800 km) away.

The Wondergraph in Hindley Street was taken over by Union Theatres in 1929, and was extensively remodelled as the Civic Theatre (sometimes called New Civic or simply The Civic) on Good Friday, 24 March 1932, showing the American drama The Secret Call. Along with the Regent Theatre in Regent Arcade, it was the first in Adelaide to show talkies.

The Civic was demolished to make way for the State Theatre in 1957, which included provision for CinemaScope films as well as air conditioning. The State Theatre closed in May 1977. In 2002, it was converted into a bar, nightclub, and cabaret club, known as The Weimar Room. After undergoing renovations, it reopened in May 2019 as a music and entertainment venue named Downtown. As of 2022, 27 Hindley Street is occupied by Precinct Nightclub.

=== York Theatre ===
The Greater Wondergraph company bought the land on the corner of Rundle Street (now Rundle Mall) and Gawler Place and built the York Theatre, which opened on 5 November 1921. The building was regarded as an "architectural masterpiece" and dubbed "Adelaide's first skyscraper". The interior walls had landscapes depicting Australian scenery painted by decorator George Coulter. The York was taken over by Greater Union in January 1929, at which time the inaugural manager, Mr C. E. Webb, was still in charge (and remained so until at least 1937).

The cinema was modernised in May 1938 and started showing new releases for MGM films. It was demolished in the 1960s when Gawler Place was widened. The cinema was featured in a photographic exhibition called Now Showing... Cinema Architecture in South Australia, held at the Hawke Centre's Kerry Packer Civic Gallery in April/May 2024.

=== Others ===
In September 1912, the company was making plans to expand into the suburbs of Norwood and Unley, with the intention of building adjacent indoor and outdoor cinemas in each.
