= Milne & Co =

South Australian wine merchants

Milne & Co. was a South Australian company of wine merchants, with premises on Grenfell Street, Adelaide, founded and for much of its history run by members of the Milne family.

== History ==
Disher & Milne

William Milne (later Sir William) (17 May 1822 – 23 April 1895) formed a partnership with brother-in-law James Wardlaw Disher and in July 1846 purchased a Hindley Street wine merchant business from Patrick Auld (1811–1886) who was returning to England. The business operated as Disher & Milne from 1846 until July 1853 when the partnership was dissolved, and William Milne opened a similar business under his own name on Grenfell Street, opposite Elder & Co. From August 1853 the business continued with James B. Manford as Disher & Manford, then in March 1854 was bought out by Peter G. Harris. In 1857 William Milne was elected to the seat of Onkaparinga, and retired from business around the same time.

William Milne, jun.

In November 1869, his son William Milne, jun. (1849–1905) opened a wine and spirit store as "William Milne, jun." at 32–36 Grenfell Street (once the site of Beeby & Dunstan's flour mill), adjacent Elder, Smith & Co.'s building (later the site of Australian Widows' Fund Life Assurance Society building).

Milne & Co.

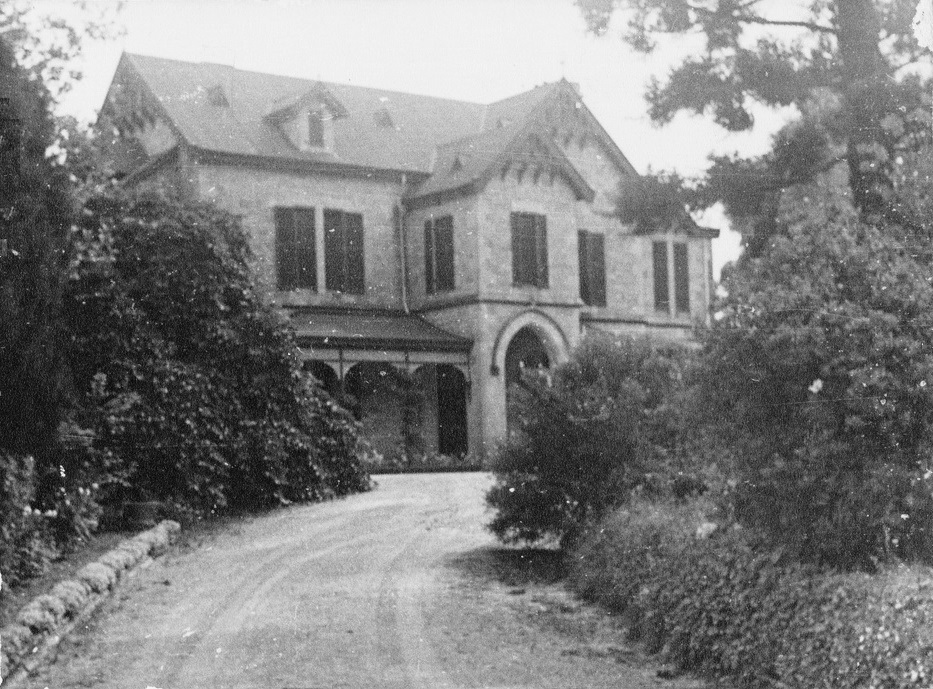
"Byethorne", Mount Lofty, home of William Milne, jun., later St. Catherine's Convent

In March 1882, William Milne, jun. took on his brother George Milne (1856–1934) and Henry Archibald Price (1849–1895) as partners. George had been a senior manager there for some years, and Price had until recently been manager of the Mount Gambier branch of the National Bank of Australasia. Their brother John Milne was also involved in the company for a time.

In 1887 William Milne, jun. and Price quietly retired from active involvement in the company, leaving George Milne in control. William had a home on Palmer Place, North Adelaide and a summer residence, "Byethorne" at Mount Lofty. He was an active director of the Executor Trustee and Agency Company. Price died in 1895.

In 1893 the South Australian Brewing, Malting & Wine & Spirit Co. Ltd., intent on focusing on beer brewing, sold their stocks of wines and spirits to Milne & Co. and to A. E. & F. Tolley Pty Ltd., and became the South Australian Brewing Company, Limited.

In May 1925 the business was registered as an incorporated company. George died in 1934, a very wealthy man.

== The Milne family ==
William Milne married Eliza Disher (c. 1818 – 17 August 1912), daughter of John Disher of "Byethorne", Nairne, South Australia in 1842; they later lived at "Sunnyside", Glen Osmond; among their large family were:

- William Milne, jun. (1849 – 14 December 1905) married Emma Sophia Simpson (1850 – 8 September 1914), daughter of Capt. Henry Simpson on 17 March 1870
- John Milne (3 November 1854 – 12 July 1934) married Lucy Edith Macgeorge (4 September 1859 – ) on 11 November 1875.

- Rev. John Philip Milne (c. 1878 – c. 1 September 1924) worked among poor in London
- George S(tanley) Milne (9 May 1879 – 1961) married Alice Belle Greenland, Inspector of Ships, South Africa
- L(eslie) Hugh Milne (1882– ) served in South Africa 1901, Inspector of Fisheries at Swansea, Wales.
- Lucy Edith Milne (1884 – 1961) married Kenneth James Stephen in 1918, lived in Blackwood.
- F(rank) Kenneth Milne (18 July 1885 – 3 October 1980), architect, married Hazel Muir Fotheringham in 1913

- Kenneth Lancelot Milne was founding president of the SA division of the Australian Democrats, and MLC 1979-85.

- E(rnest) Malcolm Milne (c. 1886–1963) married Gladys Burden on 1 March 1910, lived at Glenelg
- Mary Elizabeth Milne ( –1955) married Harold Powell in 1914, lived in Largs Bay

- George Milne (23 August 1856 – 17 August 1934) married Georgina Ellen Swinden on 14 June 1884.

- Clive Gordon Milne (19 February 1885 – 12 March 1933)
- Roy Melville Milne (19 February 1885 – 2 April 1938) noted racehorse owner
