= Ozone Theatres =

Historic cinema chain in South Australia

Ozone Theatres Ltd, formerly Ozone Picture Company and then Ozone Amusements Ltd, was a cinema chain based in Adelaide, South Australia, from 1911 until 1951, when it sold its theatres to Hoyts. It was founded by Hugh Waterman and friends, and was jointly run by him and seven sons, including Clyde Waterman and Sir Ewen McIntyre Waterman. S.A. Theatres and Ozone Theatres (Broken Hill) were subsidiary companies, and the chain was referred to as the Ozone circuit. It was one of two major film exhibitors in the state from after World War I until the late 1940s, the other being D. Clifford Theatres Limited. After 1938, Ozone dominated the market.

== History ==
Hugh McIntyre Waterman, a stationer, founded Ozone Picture Company, later renamed Ozone Amusements Ltd, in the seaside suburb (formerly a separate town) of Semaphore in 1911, along with four other residents, Les and Horace Warn, Jim Woods, and Chris Flaherty. They screened films in Semaphore Town Hall on two nights a week, (Note: This was after Wondergraph's outdoor cinema, the Picturedrome, was established in Semaphore in December 1910, but before the newly-built indoor Wondergraph was opened in May 1920.) and later four nights a week at Port Adelaide Town Hall. Apart their first purpose-built indoor cinema in Port Adelaide in 1913, called the Ozone, until 1923 they showed films in existing available halls, including Unley Town Hall.

There were a few competitors at that time, but as the era of silent films came to an end around 1929, Ozone and Dan Clifford's Star were the two surviving and dominating owners of cinemas in the suburbs of Adelaide. The main competitor to Ozone was D. Clifford Theatres, which began as Star in 1917 and continued to operate as the Clifford Circuit until a few years after Dan Clifford's death in 1942, when Greater Union bought his cinemas. The two companies dominated the market in South Australia from after World War I until the late 1940s, but after 1938, Ozone was bigger.

In 1924 Ozone built its second picture theatre in Fussell Place in Alberton, next to Alberton Railway Station and right next door to Waterman's own residence. In 1927, the cinemas were showing matinee performances as well as in the evenings. A theatre at Enfield followed, and in 1929 Semaphore Town Hall was converted into a cinema.

By 1928, Ozone Theatres Ltd had bought a number of cinemas from National Theatres (aka National Pictures), in the Adelaide suburbs of Prospect and Marryatville, and the Wonderview and Victor Theatres and at the seaside town of Victor Harbor. They also acquired leases of cinemas at North Adelaide and Norwood.

Adelaide architect Chris A. Smith designed nearly all of Ozone's cinemas during the 1920s. In the early 1930s, the company started using Adelaide designer and interior specialist E. Grant Walsh, but after appointing F. Kenneth Milne to rebuild the Victor Theatre at Victor Harbor after a fire in 1934, he was appointed to design all of their cinemas in the state. In about 1942, new construction was halted by World War II.

Hugh Waterman's eldest son Ewen joined the family business in 1928. Before November 1934, the family created the subsidiary company S.A. Theatres Ltd, for the purpose of taking on the lease of the Theatre Royal in the city, and for creating the Chinese Gardens open-air theatre at the Exhibition Grounds on North Terrace (opened in November 1934, Adelaide's first outdoor talkie theatre). Both theatres would show the same MGM films at both venues.

In April 1936, 25 years after entering the cinema industry, Hugh Waterman was managing director of three companies: Ozone Theatres Ltd, S.A. Theatres, and Ozone Theatres (Broken Hill). Ewen and his six brothers developed the companies over 20 years. Brother Clyde became joint managing director in 1938. Ewen was managing director of S.A. Theatres in August 1939. Keith Waterman managed the Ozone at Port Pirie (formerly the Alhambra; acquired in 1930). Hugh had seven sons, the others being Donald, Laurie, Norman, and Douglas, all of whom had executive positions in the business. (Note: See 1934 advertisement for photos.) The company became the major promoter of British films in Australia.

Ozone Glenelg, opened on 25 November 1937, was considered the chain's flagship. In the same year, they acquired the Lyric Picture Palace in Murray Bridge, renaming it Ozone Theatre. In November 1937, the Ozone Sport and Social Club first annual picnic was held in Belair National Park. In 1938, the company employed over 300 people.

The chain expanded interstate. In March 1938 it had suburban theatres at Glenelg, Port Adelaide, Semaphore, Alberton, Enfield, Prospect, and Marryatville; country cinemas at Port Pirie, Victor Harbor, Murray Bridge, and Renmark; and interstate at Broken Hill (Lenard's Theatre), New South Wales, and at Mildura, Victoria. In that month S.A. Theatres struck a deal with the Greater Wondergraph Company worth £200,000, to purchase assets which included the Civic and York Theatres in the city, as well as the Wondergraph Unley and the Wondergraph Goodwood (for some time called the Star, under D. Clifford Theatres). The purchase of the Wondergraph assets in 1939 made the group one of the principal cinema chains in the country.

In August 1947, S.A. Theatres sold the Civic Theatre in Hindley Street to Greater Union, who were leasing the theatre at the time.

By 1949, Ozone Theatres ran 34 cinemas in SA and interstate Adelaide suburban cinemas included Port Adelaide, Semaphore, Thebarton, Glenelg, and the Windsor Theatres at Brighton, Lockleys, Hilton, and St Morris.

In 1948 Ewen resigned his roles with Waterman Brothers Ltd and its associated companies.

In 1951 the Waterman family sold most of their Ozone theatres to Hoyts, with the new company known as Hoyts-Ozone Theatres Ltd.

== Impact ==
According to the South Australian Heritage Council (2022), Ozone Theatres "shaped public experiences and expectations of cinema-going during the interwar period, establishing high standards for film exhibition and introducing numerous innovations in architectural expression, technology and comfort, especially during the sound film era after 1929".

== Cinemas after sale ==
Semaphore Cinema, originally in the town hall, was expanded and extensively refurbished in 1929 in Art Deco style, eventually closing in May 1960. Ozone Alberton was closed in 1961.

The Hoyts Ozone Theatre in Murray Bridge closed in 1969.

Ozone Glenelg became Glenelg Cinema Centre when it was expanded and operated by Wallis Cinemas, finally closing in 2009.

The Ozone Marryatville has been fully restored and is now the Regal Theatre, within the suburb now named Kensington Park.

The Victor Harbor cinema had a seating capacity of 910 at the time of its takeover. It was renamed as Ozone Theatre, with its vertical signage on the facade simply "Ozone". After further changes of hands and renovations, it was renamed Victa Cinema in 1995 and converted into twin screens. In 2005 it changed hands and underwent further renovations, while retaining the Art Deco fittings, and in 2020 was acquired by the City of Victor Harbor. It has been heritage-listed. It was featured in a photographic exhibition called Now Showing... Cinema Architecture in South Australia held at the Hawke Centre's Kerry Packer Civic Gallery in April/May 2024.

== Ewen Waterman ==
Sir Ewen McIntyre Waterman was secretary of the South Australian Theatrical Proprietors' Association in 1937; president of the South Australian Motion Picture Exhibitors' Association in 1944; and vice-president of the Federal Cinema Exhibitors' Council of Australia in 1947. After resigning from the companies associated with his brothers, he moved on to internationally based posts relating to the Australian wool industry, and was knighted for his services to the pastoral industry in 1963.
