= All-British League =

Organisation in South Australia during World War I

The All-British League was an organisation in South Australia during World War I. Its objectives were to promote British traditions and culture at the expense of others in the state, especially to suppress any social or political influence from German Australian citizens and residents, whether born in Australia or not.

== Background ==
The Colony of South Australia was settled beginning in 1836 as a free colony. Immigrants were encouraged from Great Britain, and also migrants were encouraged from Europe, in particular German and Wendish Lutherans from Silesia who were seeking to escape religious oppression by Prussia. Over 5400 Germans immigrated in the 1850s. Many of these settled in their own communities including Klemzig, Hahndorf, the Barossa Valley and Lobethal. Over time, these farmers and tradesmen and their families spread across more of the colony (state after 1901). In many of these communities, the Lutheran church had a Lutheran school nearby, quite a few of which taught in the German language.

== League objectives ==
The league began in Port Adelaide and also established a branch in Adelaide itself. It was supported by several community leaders, including the Governor of South Australia, Sir Henry Galway.

The All-British League sought to intern all "subjects of enemy origin" and remove voting rights, prohibit from parliaments, and remove status as Justice of the Peace. The League referred as "alien enemies" not only immigrants from Germany, regardless of whether they had sworn allegiance and been naturalised as British subjects or Australian citizens, but also to their Australian-born descendants.

The league held meetings and recruitment drives in Semaphore Town Hall during the course of the war.

It was explicitly non-partisan in politics, but sought to influence whatever politicians were in power.

== Supporters ==
The league received support from senior officials. These included

- Sir Henry Galway, Governor of South Australia
- Sir Samuel Way, Chief Justice of the Supreme Court of South Australia
- John Verran member for Wallaroo and former premier of South Australia
- J. P. Wilson MLC

== Opposition ==
Not all British Australians supported the objects of the All-British League. One contributor to a newspaper noted that the entire British royal family would fail the parentage test to join the All-British League due to intermarrying with other European royalty, and that there were already Australians of German parentage killed or injured fighting for the British side.
