= Regal Theatre, Adelaide =

Heritage-listed cinema in Kensington Park, Adelaide, South Australia

The Regal Theatre
- Regal Theatre in 2026
- Former names: Princess Theatre; Ozone Marryatville (Theatre); Chelsea Cinema

General information
- Architectural style: Art Deco
- Location: Kensington Park (Adelaide), South Australia, Australia
- Coordinates: 34.926354°S 138.651474°E
- Current tenants: City of Burnside
- Completed: 24 November 1925
- Renovated: 1941, 1983, 2020
- Owner: City of Burnside

Design and construction
- Architects: Chris A. Smith (1925); F. Kenneth Milne (1941)

The Regal Theatre, formerly known as the Chelsea Cinema, the Princess Theatre and the Ozone Marryatville or Marryatville Ozone Theatre, is a single-screen cinema in Kensington Park, a suburb of Adelaide, South Australia. Originally built in 1925 to the designs of South Australian theatre architect Christopher Arthur Smith, it retains the features of a major renovation in Art Deco style in 1941 designed by noted cinema architect F. Kenneth Milne. It was heritage-listed on the South Australian Heritage Register in 1983. It is the oldest continuously running purpose-built cinema in Adelaide, and the only remaining silent cinema still operating in the city. It is owned by Burnside Council.

== History ==
The cinema's location at no. 275 Kensington Road forms part of a ribbon development of businesses along the arterial road, usually referred to as the Marryatville shops, although the businesses span four suburbs. The Marryatville Hotel is in Kensington, and the cinema was built in proximity to the post office and former primary school, police station and bowling club sites. Coopers Brewery was nearby in Leabrook, and many of its employees lived in the area at the time.

The cinema was opened on 24 November 1925 by National Pictures Ltd as the Princess Theatre, cited as located in Marryatville. at that time in a late Edwardian style designed for National Pictures (who also owned cinemas at Prospect, North Adelaide, Norwood and Victor Harbor) by South Australian theatre architect Christopher Arthur Smith. (Smith (1892–1952) had no formal architectural training, but is recognised as one of the leading South Australian exponents of the Art Deco style for his later works.) It was designed for silent films, and in the early days, presented pantomimes accompanied by the Princess Theatre Orchestra. The film shown at the opening night was Little Annie Rooney, starring Mary Pickford. The initial seating capacity was 1500. The original configuration allowed for an orchestra pit around the screen area.

The Waterman family, who owned Ozone Theatres Ltd, purchased National Pictures Ltd in 1928. The cinema was adapted for "talkies" when they became available in 1929, and in 1940–41 a substantial upgrade to an Art Deco was undertaken by Frank Kenneth Milne Architect (1885–1980) under the direction of the Waterman family. It reopened as the Ozone Marryatville on 30 May 1941, with a reduced seating capacity of 1145, or up to 1490, according to The News, which also reports that it only shut completely for a period of one week. The 1941 refurbishment included new facilities and internal structures, including a function room, parents' room and facilities for the hearing-impaired. The foyer included a fireplace, and upholstered seating was provided. The plaster mouldings adorning the roof and walls of the cinema were added at this time.

The cinema was sold to the Hoyts Group in 1951 (after a merger with Ozone Pictures). A cinemascope screen replaced the smaller traditional screen in 1955, allowing for a wider range of films to be shown. In 1963 the building was up for sale and Amoco Petrol Company was interested in buying the Cinema and building a petrol station on the site. However, Burnside Council purchased it and leased it back to Hoyts.

From 1 January 1971, Wallis Cinemas took over the lease, as part of their expansion across Adelaide, saving the cinema from demolition and renaming it as the Chelsea Cinema. Business was slow at the time, and the equipment outdated; the projection equipment dated back to 1937! The screen was small, seats damaged, the curtains and carpet worn out. The cinema's future was discussed at a council meeting in 1977, due to the ongoing need for restoration of the cinema. Wallis replaced the screen and reduced the seating capacity, with some of the sections of the building found to be infested with white ants.

Another major renovation took place in 1983–1984, after the building was listed on the state's heritage register, the South Australian Heritage Register, as "the oldest purpose-built cinema in Adelaide, (Note: Note: The Semaphore Odeon Star is in fact the oldest purpose-built cinema in Adelaide, having been opened on 22 May 1920 as the Wondergraph Picture Palace, with a seating capacity of 1,246 in orchestra and balcony levels, but it was not used as a cinema between 1976 and 1991 (i.e. when the Chelsea was heritage listed in 1983, which explains the discrepancy).) the only remaining silent cinema still operating, and as a building of architectural & cultural significance to Burnside", and the Council secured a grant under the Community Employment Program. The number of seats was reduced from 1145 to 586, a new floor, screen, acoustic equipment and carpet were installed, and the cinema was repainted for the first time since 1955. The cinema began to show first-release films at this time, increasing its attractiveness to audiences.

In 2008, the City of Burnside was approached about selling the Chelsea Cinema and the adjacent May Street property. After an Expression of Interest process for the sale of the site was run, there was strong community activism campaigning for the building to remain in public ownership as a cinema in perpetuity. As a result of this, the council implemented a conservation management plan for the Chelsea Cinema in 2009, and the Chelsea Cinema Strategic Plan in 2011, to guide the development, conservation and ongoing maintenance of the buildings. It then leased the cinema to a private operator, awarding the lease to Republic Theatres in 2012, at which time the cinema was renamed the Regal Theatre on 1 February 2012.

In 2017, Council took over management of the cinema. The conservation management plan was updated in 2020 to guide the development, conservation and maintenance of the buildings, and refurbishment commenced in 2020.

Consultation with the community on a new precinct master plan took place in 2020; 1,334 responses to the survey were received, and in March 2021 two community forums were held. As of December 2022 consultation had finished and the master plan is being developed.

== Heritage listing ==
On 24 March 1983, the cinema was listed on the South Australian Heritage Register, owing to its significance "both as a rare example of an Art Deco cinema and for being a notable example of an intact cinema interior representing an era when cinema-going was a major recreational activity and impressive cinema interiors were part of making a night at the pictures a memorable experience".

== Features ==
The cinema has the following features:

- Single-screen venue
- Red brick external walls as part of the rear of the cinema complex
- Replica 1941 Art Deco fireplace and mirror in the main foyer
- Lounge seats and column decorations within the main foyer area
- Carved emblems in the foyer area as well as a wooden and chrome ticket box
- A Dolby Digital "surround sound" system
- A soundproofed "crying room" for parents of infants
- Restaurants located on either side of the cinema entrance, and a public garden to the east
- Cinema carpark accessible via Uxbridge Street and May Terrace.

As part of a 2020 refurbishment, more than 500 new seats were installed, new carpets laid, and the paintwork refreshed.

== Operation and programming ==
Historically, the cinema is well known for its Rocky Horror Picture Show screenings (two sessions – late and midnight) during the 1980s.

As of July 2020, Steve Virgo manages the cinema as an employee of Burnside Council, since being appointed in December 2016. The cinema shows first-release films and in recent years has featured live performances, including Adelaide Fringe shows.
