= Christopher Arthur Smith =

South Australian architect (1892–1952)

Christopher Arthur Smith (19 November 1892 – 2 March 1952), also known as Chris Smith and Chris A. Smith, was a South Australian architect. He was a prolific designer of picture theatres and public buildings in Adelaide and regional South Australia during the 1920s and 1930s, and is recognised as one of the leading South Australian exponents of the Art Deco style.

== Early life ==
Smith was born on 19 November 1892 in Rosewater, South Australia (then known as Yatala), with his name registered as Arthur Christopher Smith; however, this order of names was never subsequently recorded. His father Thomas Edwin Smith was a sailor and then labourer, his mother Elizabeth Ellen Williams was likely illiterate, and Chris was the youngest of six sons.

Chris only had about eight years of schooling, going into business with his brothers in a film distribution business in Port Adelaide. In 1915 Smith was registered as a carpenter. There is no record of any architectural training.

== Architectural career ==
Smith had no formal architectural training, but was a prolific designer of cinemas and public buildings in Adelaide and regional South Australia during the 1920s and 1930s, and is recognised as one of the leading South Australian exponents of the Art Deco style.

In 1917 he signed himself as architect in documentation relating to the construction of a cinema in Kadina, and in 1924 claimed to have practised as an architect for ten years. He practised in King William Street, Adelaide until 1932, and subsequently from his home at 5a (now 3) Prospect Road, Prospect. After purchasing the adjoining property at no. 5, he built an Art Deco style home on that property’s tennis court, including a garage with his office and studio above facing Carter Street, in 1938. This was later hailed as an "iconic building" of Adelaide.

He was responsible for at least 12 Adelaide cinemas between the 1910s and 1940s. He designed the original Victor Theatre at Victor Harbor, opened in November 2023, but this building was almost razed to the ground in 1934 and was rebuilt to the design of F. Kenneth Milne (and now heritage-listed). Smith also designed the Wonderview Theatre at Victor Harbor, which was opened in December 1923, was later used as a dance hall, and has since been demolished. Smith became official architect for the family-owned chain Ozone Theatres in the 1920s.

After the Architects Act 1939 came into force, Smith was registered from 1941 until his death in 1952, having fulfilled the requirement of working as an architect for a specified period. In January 1946 he was admitted as an Associate of the South Australian Institute of Architects, even though he was no longer working as an architect.

== Later life and legacy ==
He lived with his wife and children in Prospect. In later life he was a Freemason, belonging to the Lodge of Faith No. 9, and was also a member of the Prospect Bowling Club.

He died at home on 2 March 1952.

Five of his buildings appear in the Australian Institute of Architects listing of "South Australia Significant Twentieth Century Architecture", and several more the South Australian Heritage Register.

== Selected works ==
=== Cinemas ===
- Star Theatre, Hindmarsh (1916) (an expansion of the old town hall), one of Dan Clifford's earliest cinemas, later known as the Odeon Star, Cinema Italia, Cinema Europa, and Windsor Theatre
- Austral Picture Palace, Kilkenny (1922)
- Ozone Theatre in Prospect (1923)
- Star Theatre at Norwood (1923, supervising architect, with Sydney architects Kaberry and Chard), now the Odeon Theatre
- Victor Theatre in Victor Harbor, opened as an Ozone Theatre in 1934; later gutted by fire and rebuilt to designs by F. Kenneth Milne
- Ozone Theatre in Enfield (1926)
- Ozone Theatre in Alberton (1924)
- Garden Theatre in Colonel Light Gardens (1927; closed 1962); also known as Colonel Light Gardens Theare, Odeon Star, Garden Picture Theatre, Hoyts Ozone
- Princess Theatre in (then) Marryatville (1929), now the Regal Theatre, Kensington Park
- Ozone Theatre, Semaphore, now Semaphore Library (1929)
- Austral Theatre (1935), Naracoorte, later known as the Rivoli Theatre
- Roxy Theatre, Everard Park (1937; closed 1961)
- Star Theatre, Wakefield Street, Adelaide (a complete refurbishment of the Central Picture Theatre)
- Capri Theatre in the suburb of Goodwood (1941)
- Savoy News Theatre (1941; closed 1966), 43-45 Rundle Mall, Adelaide city centre, a.k.a. Savoy News Luxe, Globe

=== Other buildings ===
- Peterborough Town Hall (1927)
- Semaphore Soldiers Memorial Hall at Semaphore (1929)
- Hindmarsh Town Hall at Hindmarsh (1936), specifically designed to accommodate a picture theatre with seating for 2,000 people; listed on the South Australian Heritage Register in November 1989.
- Port Adelaide Municipal Chambers (1939)
- Adelaide Hebrew Congregation (1938), Art Deco facade remodelling of synagogue building on Rundle Street
