= Peterborough Town Hall, South Australia =

Heritage-listed town hall in Peterborough, South Australia

Peterborough Town Hall
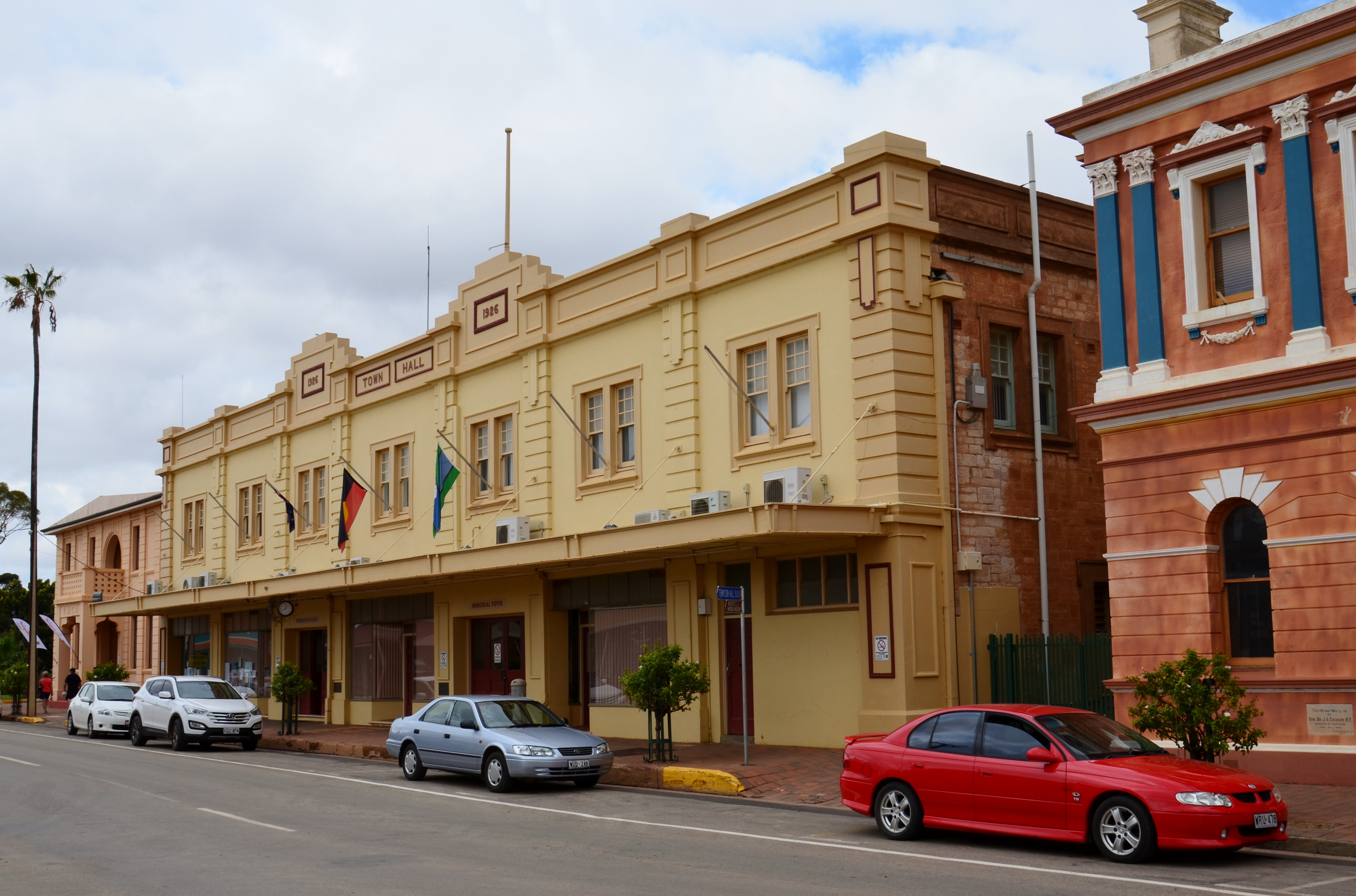
- The Town Hall in 2017
- Location: 108 Main Street; Peterborough SA 5422
- Coordinates: 32.9734°S 138.8382°E
- Built: 1927
- Architect: Chris A. Smith
- Governing body: District Council of Peterborough

South Australian Heritage Register
- Type: State Heritage Place
- Designated: 21 October 1993
- Reference no.: 16001

The Peterborough Town Hall is a heritage-listed town hall at 108 Main Street, Peterborough, South Australia. It was designed by Chris A. Smith and built in 1927, and was added to the South Australian Heritage Register on 21 October 1993.

The first town hall in Peterborough was the former Petersburg Institute building, which was transferred to the Corporate Town of Petersburg for use as a town hall in 1889. Though it had been expected that the building would need alterations for this purpose, these took some years to occur. They were eventually approved by a ratepayer ballot on 29 December 1893. The additions provided for a new stage and dressing rooms, new library and reading room in front, a council chamber and clerk's office, and a new classical facade replacing the previous "blank wall", at a cost of £1,200. It reopened to the public in September 1894. By 1925, however, the former institute building was seen as inadequate, with no alterations having been made in thirty years, and by the following year the council was investigating options for constructing a new building.

Christopher Arthur Smith, an architect who designed a number of South Australian public buildings, had completed a design for the new hall by June 1926: located adjacent to the old hall, it was to have five office fronts, a subscribers' room, a public reading room, a town clerk's office, a council chamber, and a hall seating 1,100 to 1,200 people, at an expected cost of £11,705. The foundation stone for the new hall was laid on 23 March 1927. A loan was authorised in October to allow the council to complete payments on the new hall. It was officially opened on 15 November 1927. MP George Jenkins described it as "the finest hall he had seen in any town of the same size." The council had planned to sell the former hall to cover the costs of the new hall, but failed to reach the desired price and initially leased it out instead. The final cost came to £13,961.0.6.

The building continues to be used by its successor council, the District Council of Peterborough. The former hall also survives; however, it is now a private residence.
