= Victa Cinema =

Cinema in Victor Harbor, South Australia

Coordinates: 35°33′15″S 138°37′22″E

Victa Cinema is a state heritage-listed cinema in the town of Victor Harbor, South Australia. The original building was designed by noted cinema architect Chris A. Smith and opened in 1923, but was extensively damaged by fire and rebuilt in 1934 to designs by F. Kenneth Milne. This reconstructed building is thought to be one of the first buildings in South Australia created in a style known as streamlined architecture. Its ownership changed from its first private owner, to National Pictures, to Ozone Theatres in 1928, before being taken over by Hoyts in 1951. After partial closure in the 1960s it was run by a series of independent operators, with an extra screen being added in 1998 and later renovations in 2005. Since 2020, it has been owned by the City of Victor Harbor.

== History ==
The Victor Theatre, described as a "beautiful new picture palace" was designed by noted cinema architect Chris A. Smith and built on the site of Ocean Street Garage, owned by D. H. Griffin & Sons. Construction was completed in four and a half months and cost £6,000. David Henry Griffin was a businessman who had also worked in public service, had twice contested seats in the House of Assembly, and had run a picture theatre in Murray Bridge. Moving to Victor Harbor, he had been a councillor for two years and mayor of the town for a term. He first operated a motor garage on the site of the theatre, before moving the garage and getting the theatre constructed on the site. It opened under the control of Griffin Pictures on 24 November 1923, just before Griffin's 60th birthday, and seated 700 people. The mayor J. C. Joy and his wife were present at the opening. On 30 November 1923, the 1922 Canadian film The Man from Glengarry showed at the Victor Theatre.

After a new cinema, the Wonderview Theatre, opened in Victor Harbor in December 1928 by National Pictures Limited (also known as National Theatres), including a modern soda fountain and "soda lounge", the Griffins built a lounge and cafe along the full length of the northern side of the theatre, extending, estimated to have cost an additional £4,000. On 24 November 1926, the Griffins licensed the Victor to National Theatres (aka National Pictures), who operated both theatres until January 1928.

On 3 February 1928, Hugh Waterman, managing director of Ozone Theatres, announced that his company had taken over National Pictures on 31 January 1928. National Pictures had commenced operations on the Esplanade at Victor Harbor with the Wonderview, and had since built theatres at the Adelaide suburbs of Marryatville and Colonel Light Gardens, and later acquired the Victor Theatre from Griffin's Pictures, but was liquidated on 31 January 1928. This meant that Ozone now had ownership or leases of picture theatres in Semaphore, Port Adelaide, Alberton, Norwood, Prospect, Marryatville, Colonel Light Gardens, North Adelaide, Enfield, and Victor Harbor. Waterman said that he would be undertaking a major renovation of the Victor Theatre, including the addition of a dress circle, expanding the capacity by 350 to accommodate 1000 people. In March 1928, Ozone Theatres signed a contract with Jack Fewster to provide orchestras in all 10 of their theatres. From June 1928, when the Wonderview ceased operations in the winter months, the Ozone became the main cinema in the town.

In February 1928, Ozone Theatres screened Madame X at both the Victor and Wonderview Theatres, and in May screened the 1925 film Ben Hur, starring Ramon Novarro, in both. In July 1928, the Cecil B. DeMille film The King of Kings was screened at the Victor Theatre.

In November 1930, Ozone installed a Western Electric sound system at a cost of £3,000, so that "talkies" could be shown at the Victor.

On 14 January 1931, a serious fire damaged the rear of the theatre, leading to closure for most of the rest of the year, opening just before Christmas. During this time, it transferred some of its equipment to the Wonderview and film were screened there. In 1932, Allan Woodard became manager and projectionist at the theatre.

After a huge fire gutted the building on 15 January 1934, it underwent reconstruction and extension in September of that year, to designs by F. Kenneth Milne as sole practitioner. Milne re-used some footings and lower walls from the southern and eastern sides, but the rest was demolished. The theatre was substantially enlarged in height, width, and length (the latter enabled by the acquisition of property at the rear). The building cost about £15,000 to build, and seated a total of 963. It is thought to be one of the first buildings in South Australia created in the style known as streamlined, a type of Art Deco that became popular in the 1930s.

On 21 December 1934 the Victor Theatre reopened as the Ozone Theatre, with its vertical signage on the facade simply "Ozone".

The cinema had a seating capacity of 910 at the time of its takeover by Hoyts in 1951. After the introduction of television in 1959, the cinema operated restricted opening times from 1960 onwards, and from 1963 closed during the winter.

In 1970 it was acquired by independent operator Roy Denison for A$25,000, who reopened it as the Victa Theatre and expanded the stage area in 1975, to allow for live performances. Geoff Stock bought the cinema upon Denison's retirement in 1995, and it was fully renovated and renamed Victa Cinema. Twin screens were created in August 1998, with the former balcony screen seating 286, and the screen in the former stalls screen seating 297.

In 2005 it was bought by David and Carol Stonnill, who upgraded the building further, while retaining the Art Deco character.

In November 2012, 2K digital projectors were installed in both cinemas, and a new screen downstairs. A 3D projector was added downstairs in July 2015. In late 2016, the City of Victor Harbor installed a digital projector on the other side of Ocean Street, allowing digital art to be projected onto the façade of the cinema. In October 2020 the council purchased the cinema, intending to include it in the town's Arts and Culture centre in the future.

== Impact and heritage listing ==
Milne's design had considerable impact on future new cinemas, both in modern architectural expression and with its planning for both sightlines and acoustics in the new era of talkies. More attention was also paid to concealed lighting, ventilation, and gathering spaces for patrons. It was his first commission from Ozone Theatres, who had used Chris A. Smith in the 1920s, and he henceforth became their appointed architect for all South Australian projects until about 1942, when World War II led to a pause in new construction.

The Victa was heritage-listed on the South Australian Heritage Register on 17 August 2023. Its entry states:

The Victa Cinema (former Ozone Theatre) demonstrates the evolution of motion pictures as a new form of mass entertainment in the twentieth century, and in particular, the role of cinema-going and its contribution to community building in regional South Australia in the interwar period. As the first South Australian picture theatre purpose-built to screen "talkies", [it] established the pattern for all picture theatres that followed... [it] is an early, outstanding example of interwar streamlined architecture... [It] is also the only remaining intact picture theatre purpose-built by Ozone Theatres Limited.

In the full documentation, it states that the building "established a clear break with the past and also set the pattern for all purpose-built interwar picture theatres that followed, in terms of planning, acoustics, aesthetic expression and audience comfort. It is therefore considered to be an influential and pivotal example of the class of place".

The cinema retains its Art Deco fittings. It was featured in a photographic exhibition called Now Showing... Cinema Architecture in South Australia held at the Hawke Centre's Kerry Packer Civic Gallery in April/May 2024.

== Location and description ==
The Victa Cinema is located at 37-41 Ocean St, Victor Harbor. It is a two-storey brick building, with two screens and auditoriums.
