= Dan Clifford (theatre entrepreneur) =

South Australian cinema entrepreneur

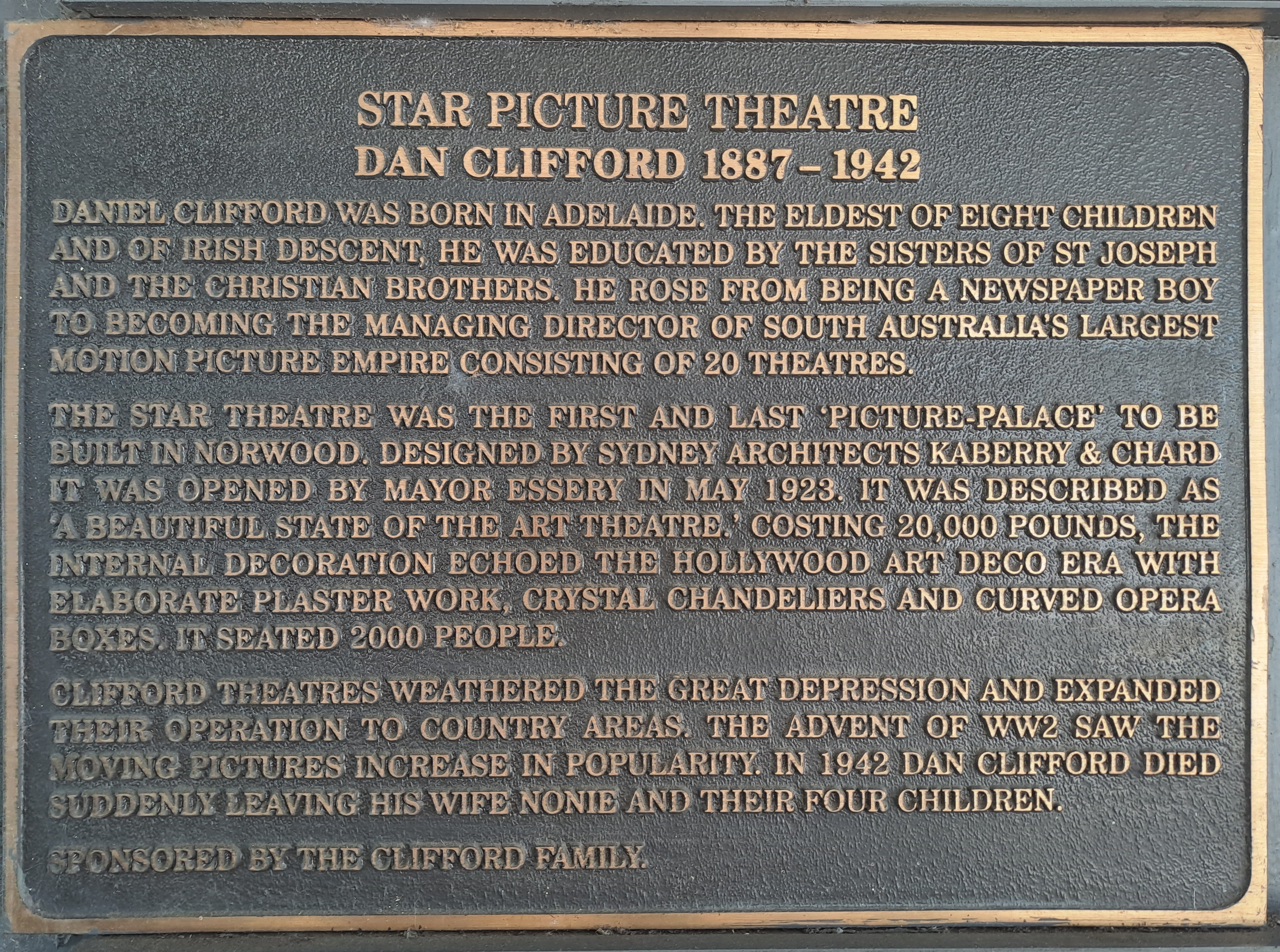
- Born: Daniel Clifford; 1887; Adelaide, South Australia
- Died: 9 December 1942 (aged 54–55); Calvary Hospital, North Adelaide
- Occupation(s): Entrepreneur, philanthropist
- Years active: 1917−1942
- Known for: Founding a cinema chain (Star and Clifford circuits)

Dan Clifford (1887 – 9 December 1942) was a well-known cinema entrepreneur and philanthropist in South Australia. He was also a keen promoter of the cinema industry, and owned 20 cinemas across the state at the time of his death, including several in Art Deco style, such as the Piccadilly Theatre and the Goodwood Star (now the Capri).

He founded the Star chain of picture theatres in 1917, which became Star Pictures Ltd in 1922 and then D. Clifford Theatres in 1923. The business was also referred to as the Clifford Theatre(s) Circuit, the Dan Clifford Cinema Circuit or Star (Theatre) Circuit in newspapers.

Five years after his death, in 1947 his theatres were bought by Greater Union; however, the business name of Clifford Theatres Ltd and the Clifford Theatre Circuit continued to be used until at least 1954.

== Early life and education ==
Clifford was born in Adelaide in 1887, to a large family in the western suburbs. He was the eldest of eight children, and one of his sisters was Ellen, who married John Walkley, who had attended Rostrevor College.

He attended St Joseph's School in Russell Street (in 1934 becoming inaugural vice-president of the Old Scholar's Association), and Sturt Street School, both in the south-western corner of Adelaide city centre.

After starting his working life in 1902 as a newsboy, selling papers outside the Supreme Court, he became a newsagent, selling stationery. He opened a second kiosk at Outer Harbor, and also became a bookie for horse-racing.

== Cinemas ==
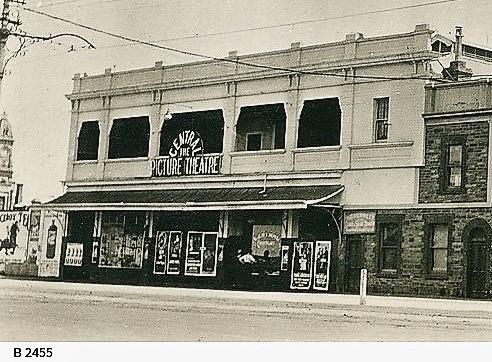
Central Picture Theatre, Wakefield St (1925)

Clifford went into the cinema industry with capital of £800, in 1916 or 1917, when he bought the Torrensville Star. He then enlarged and converted Hindmarsh's town hall to create the Hindmarsh Star Theatre, going on to do the same with Thebarton (later Thebarton Theatre) and Woodville council town halls. Initially just called Star, Clifford renamed his company Star Pictures Ltd. in 1922, and the following year again, to D. Clifford Theatres Ltd. His major competitor, Ozone Theatres, had been established in 1911.

He also built the Norwood Star (now the Odeon Theatre), the first of his single-tier theatres, which was officially opened by mayor or Norwood William Essery (Jnr) in May 1923. The Norwood Star was designed by Sydney architects Kaberry and Chard in association with local architect Chris A. Smith.

He also built cinemas at Semaphore and Port Adelaide. Other suburban cinemas included the Capitol Saint Peters (on the corner of George and Payneham Roads) and the New Star Theatre at Unley, and he also ran cinemas elsewhere in the state, including at Kadina (in a hall), and at Murray Bridge and Mount Gambier (in the old Institute building).

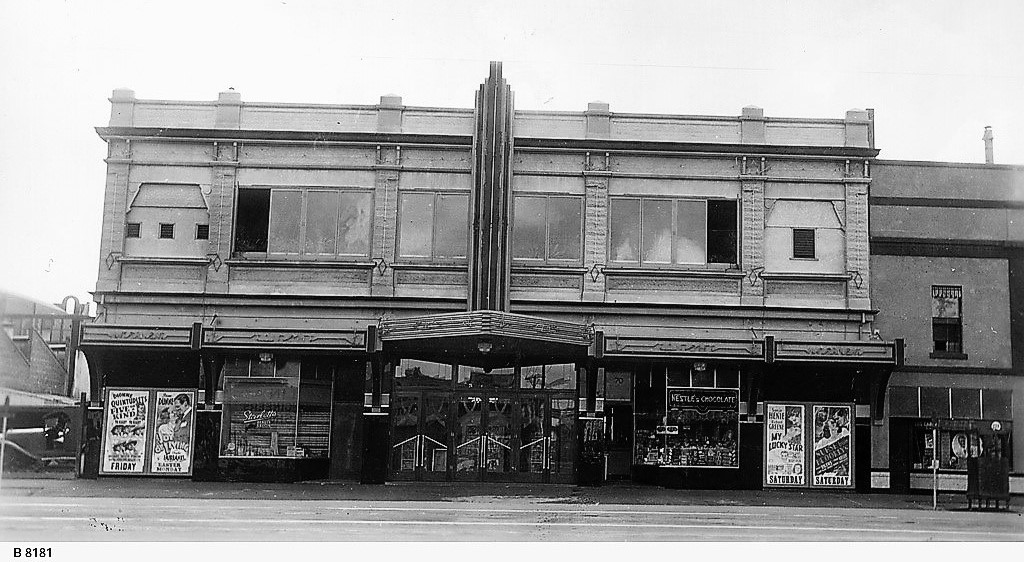
The Star Theatre, Wakefield St, c.1939

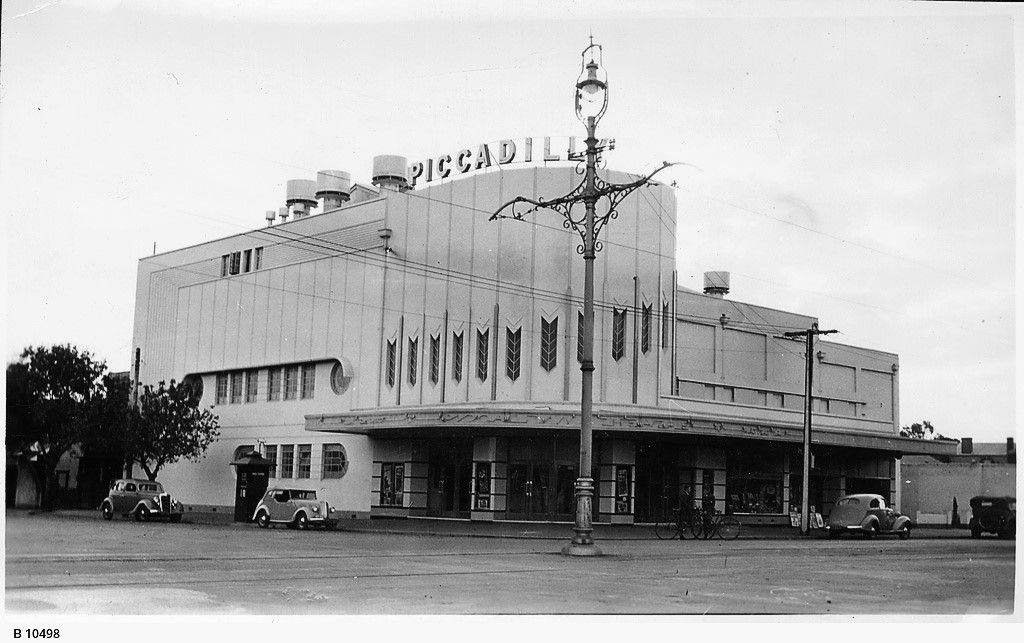
Piccadilly Theatre, North Adelaide (1941)

In September 1920 Dan Clifford bought Wondergraph's suburban circuit, which included cinemas at Unley, Goodwood, and Semaphore. The Unley and Goodwood theatres later passed back into Wondergraph hands.

Through the 1920s, Clifford also booked vaudeville entertainers to perform between films at his cinemas. In the 1930s he also built a three-storey building containing a shopping centre in Unley, which included a cinema.

The Star Theatre at 107 Henley Beach Road, Torrensville (designed by R. R. G. (Rowland) Assheton, who also designed the Grand Picture Theatre in Rundle Street) was renamed the Plaza Theatre in 1937 but remained in the Clifford circuit, and continued to operate as a cinema until at least 1957.

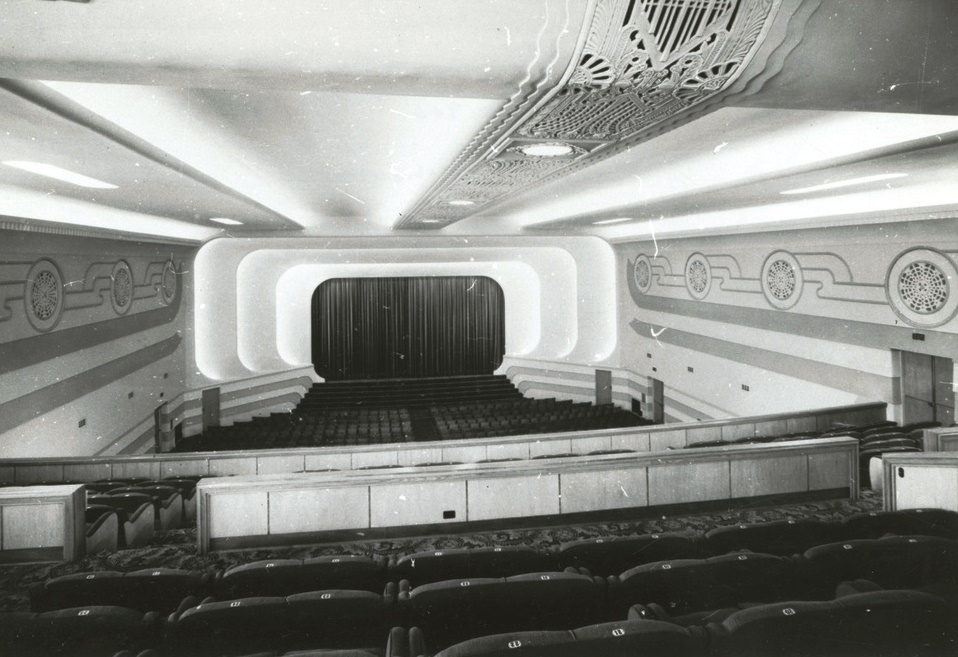
Star Theatre, Goodwood (1941), later the Capri

On Saturday 14 May 1938 the former Central Picture Theatre at 70 Wakefield Street, Adelaide was opened as the Star after a complete refit, making it into "the most modern theatre in S.A.", according to one reviewer. Architect Chris Smith had designed the new interior, and furnishings were supplied by John Martin's The Central (also designed by R. R. G. Assheton,) had been built in 1912, featuring silent films until its first talkie screened in 1930, It was variously referred to as the New Star Theatre, Wakefield Street; Wakefield Street New Star; and the Wakefield Street Star Theatre. The cinema was situated adjacent to the Wakefield Hotel on its western side. The Star closed around 1959 or 1960 and reopened in 1962/63 as a Greek theatre, the Pantheon. It was demolished (date unknown) and is now the site of a carpark next to an office block tenanted by SAPOL. The building was constructed around 1980, with its address no. 60.

After the acquisition of the New Star Theatre in Wakefield Street, it was reported that Clifford owned 15 theatres. In June 1938, advertisements for films at 12 Star Theatres featured in The Advertiser: Wakefield Street, St Peters Town Hall, St Peters Capitol, Unley, Parkside, Norwood, Goodwood, Thebarton, Woodville, Hindmarsh, Semaphore, and the Plaza Torrensville.

The Vogue Theatre in Kingswood opened on 12 July 1939, the first new cinema built in Adelaide for around 10 years. It closed in October 1976.

At some point the Windsor Theatre in Lockleys was named the Odeon Star.

The Piccadilly Theatre, built the following year, was said to have been modelled on a similar design to the Vogue.

Having earlier acquired the Ozone Theatre in Goodwood and renamed it the Star, in 1941 Clifford built the New Star Theatre two doors down. The old Star continued to operate as the Curzon Cinema until it closed in 1964, and the New Star later became the New Curzon and later the Capri. Others in the city, suburbs, and regional South Australia followed. Clifford's chain of picture theatres was the largest in Adelaide, with the Piccadilly considered the flagship of the group,

During the war years, the government assisted with obtaining scarce materials in order to get his theatres built, realising the boost to morale that films were able to give the public.

=== Size ===
In February 1945, four out of the five largest suburban cinemas in Adelaide were Clifford's:

1. Star Theatre, Hindmarsh Town Hall, seating capacity 2,012
2. Ozone Theatre, Glenelg (opened 5 November 1937), seating capacity 1,853
3. The Piccadilly, North Adelaide (opened 23 1940), seating capacity 1,437
4. The New Star Theatre, Goodwood (opened 8 October 1941; now the Capri Theatre), seating capacity 1.472

== The company ==
Clifford was managing director of D. Clifford Theatres, which was also referred to as the Clifford Theatres Circuit, the Dan Clifford Cinema Circuit or Star (Theatre) Circuit, the latter name deriving from his earliest acquisitions.

His office was in King William Street, Adelaide, and he was known as a hard worker who always had time for others.

Five years after Clifford's death in 1942, in 1947 his theatres were bought by Greater Union. However, the name "Clifford Theatres Ltd" and "Clifford Theatre Circuit" were still in use as late as December 1954, with its address at 313a King William Street.

== Other roles ==
Clifford was a philanthropist, giving generously especially to children's charities, in particular those run by Catholics.

He was president of the Motion Pictures Exhibitors from 1932 to 1935, after several years of vice-presidency.

== Personal life ==
Clifford married Nonie and they had four children: Daniel, John, Joan, and Honora. They lived on Kensington Road in Norwood. Clifford spent every Thursday afternoon with his family.

Clifford was a generous benefactor of Rostrevor College; among other things, he commissioned and donated the first ever Rostrevor flag, as well as donating the school's first movie projector. His sons Daniel jnr. and John Clifford both attended the school from 1944 .

== Death and legacy ==
Clifford died on 10 December 1942 in Calvary Hospital, North Adelaide. Being Catholic, his funeral service was held in St Ignatius Church in Norwood, and he was buried in the Catholic portion of Centennial Park Cemetery.

At the time of his death, he owned 20 cinemas across the state.
