= Mark Harrity =

British-Australian cricketer

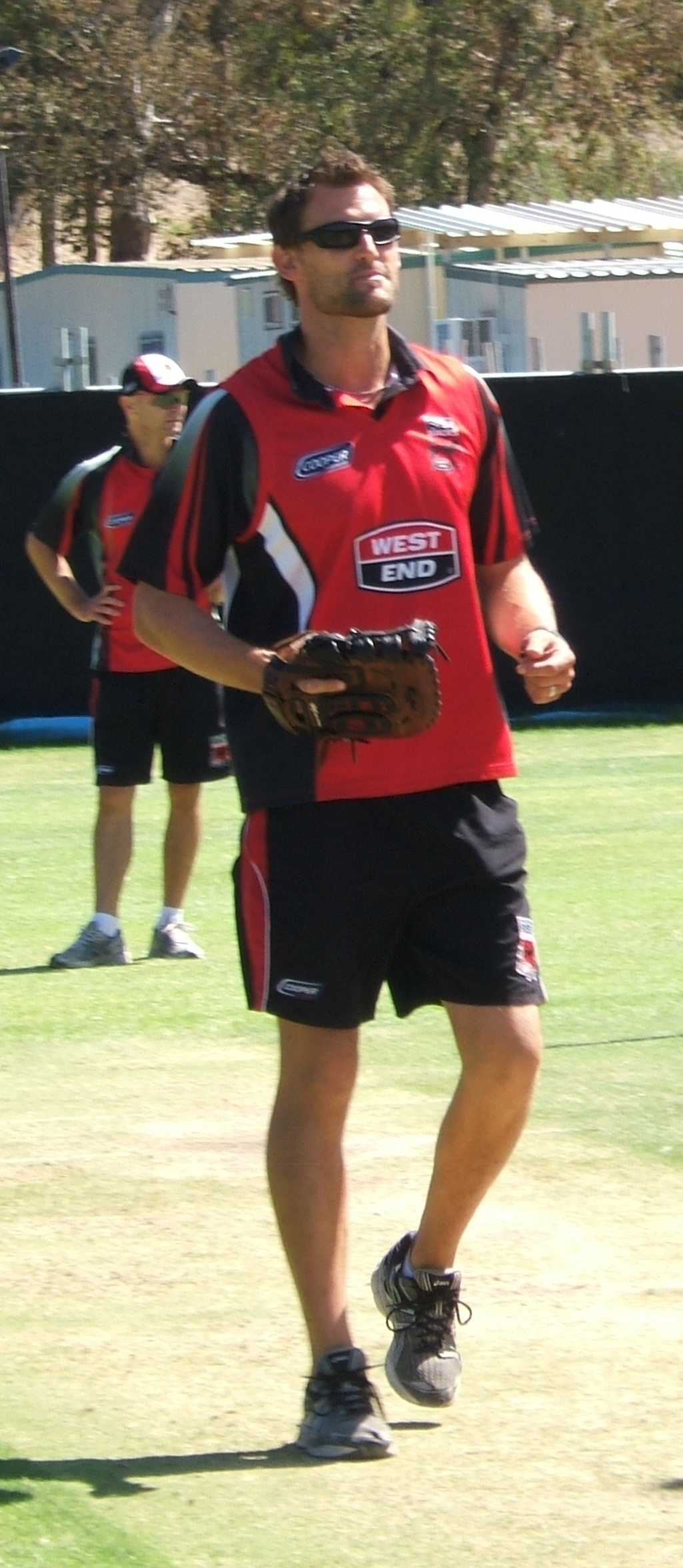
- Harrity c. 2004

Personal information
- Full name: Mark Andrew Harrity
- Born: 9 March 1974 (age 52); Semaphore, South Australia, Australia
- Height: 183 cm (6 ft 0 in)
- Batting: Right-handed
- Bowling: Left-arm fast
- Role: Bowler

Domestic team information
- Years: Team
- 1994–2003: South Australia
- 2003–2004: Worcestershire
- First-class debut: 7 January 1994 South Australia v Western Australia
- Last First-class: 25 May 2004 Worcestershire v Warwickshire
- List A debut: 18 July 1995 Young Australia v Yorkshire
- Last List A: 23 May 2004 Worcestershire v Yorkshire

Career statistics
Competition	First-class	List A
Matches	84	53
Runs scored	254	30
Batting average	5.08	6.00
100s/50s	0/0	0/0
Top score	19	15
Balls bowled	15,418	2,593
Wickets	216	78
Bowling average	39.31	25.91
5 wickets in innings	2	1
10 wickets in match	0	0
Best bowling	5/65	5/42
Catches/stumpings	26/–	10/–
- Source: Cricinfo, 7 August 2019

Mark Andrew Harrity (born 9 March 1974) is an Australian former cricketer. He was born in Semaphore, a suburb of Adelaide. He was a very fast bowler but saw his career repeatedly interrupted by injury.

Harrity made his first-class debut in the 1993–94 Sheffield Shield season, for South Australia against Western Australia at the Adelaide Oval, but went wicketless. For his first victim he had to wait over two months until selected against Tasmania, when his single scalp was that of Shaun Young. It was the following season that he came good, taking 22 first-class wickets at 34.92, including a haul of 5–92 against Western Australia in February which would remain his best for seven years. He was also selected for the Australian Cricket Academy that season.

In 1995 Harrity toured England with Young Australia, playing five first-class matches as well as his first three List A games. For some seasons thereafter he played only for his state in Australia, always coming up with around 20 first-class wickets a season but never managing a really spectacular return, partly on account of his aforementioned injury problems. In 1997–98 he recorded his best List A bowling figures, 5–42 against Victoria, while 2001–02 saw his career-best first-class figures, 5–62 against Tasmania.

In 2003 Harrity returned to England to play county cricket for Worcestershire, using a British passport. A minor but unwanted feat was to score no runs at all in five Twenty20 games for the county: two ducks, one 0* and two did-not-bats. In List A cricket he took 12 wickets at 23.58, but he did not have a successful first-class season, taking only 11 wickets in more than 166 overs at an average of only barely below 50.

He was retained by Worcestershire for 2004, but reprimanded by the ECB for an incident in a second XI match in June and played his final matches during the season.
