= Lance Milne =

Australian politician (1915-1995)

Flight Lieutenant Lance Milne CBE

Member of the South Australian Legislative Council
- In office 15 September 1979 – 6 December 1985

19th Agent-General for South Australia
- In office 26 August 1965 – 21 March 1971
- Preceded by: Malcolm Pearce
- Succeeded by: Raymond Taylor

Mayor of Walkerville
- In office 1 July 1961 – 4 July 1964
- Preceded by: Cecil Searle
- Succeeded by: Ernest Phillipson

Alderman on the Walkerville Council
- In office 1 July 1961 – 31 December 1965

Personal details
- Born: Kenneth Lancelot Milne; 16 August 1915 Norwood, South Australia
- Died: 27 December 1995 (aged 80) Stirling, South Australia
- Party: Labor Party (195?-1977); South Australian Democrats (1977-1985); Independent (1985)
- Spouse(s): Mary Milne (m. 1941; died 1980) Joan Milne (m. 1982–1995)
- Parent: F. Kenneth Milne (father)
- Military career
- Allegiance: Australia
- Branch: Royal Australian Air Force
- Service years: 1939-45
- Rank: Flight lieutenant
- Conflicts: World War II

Flight Lieutenant Kenneth Lancelot Milne CBE (16 August 1915 – 27 December 1995), generally known as Lance Milne, was an Australian Democrats member of the South Australian Legislative Council from 1979 to 1985.

== Early life and education ==
Kenneth Lancelot Milne was born on 16 August 1915, the son of architect F. Kenneth Milne (1885–1980), and great-grandson of Sir William Milne (1822–1895), of the Milne & Co. family business of wine and spirit merchants.

== World War II ==
In 1937, Milne published Ostrich Heads, a book predicting an upcoming war and encouraging young Australians to become involved in public life.

Before the outbreak of the Second World War, Milne and his wife moved to 51 Hackney Road, St. Peters. He enlisted in the Australian Defence Force on 9 November 1940 in Adelaide. Milne was a highly competent airman in the military, with his superior officer stating: Popular amongst his fellows, he [Milne] has a frank countenance and manner. He was married to Mary on 3 May 1941 and they moved to Stanley Street, North Adelaide. (Note: Possibly "Sunnyside", at no. 229, designed by his father?)

Milne reached the rank of Flight Lieutenant and piloted Supermarine Spitfires during World War II

== Local politics ==
Milne was elected to the Council the Town of Walkerville in July 1961 and was immediately elected mayor. His term began on 1 July 1961 and ended on 4 July 1964. Milne defended the trams that extended into suburban Adelaide and wished for them to be preserved for cultural significance. Also during his time on the council, Milne initiated action for a free public library in Walkerville and campaigned for the establishment of the town's YMCA Youth Centre.

Milne joined the Labor Party in the mid-1960s and supported the party in the 1966 Australian federal election. He resigned from the Walkerville council in December 1965, when he was appointed the Agent General for South Australia in London by Premier Frank Walsh. Milne held many positions in the 1960s and 1970s, including President of the Municipal Association, Chairman of the Local Government Act Revision Committee, member of the Municipal Tramways Trust and Chairman of the State Government Insurance Commission. In December 1970, when the prospects of the United Kingdom joining the European Union started to grow greater, Milne said "If more countries go into the Common Market [EU], it will start the greatest war ever seen," later comparing the common market to the Roman Empire, stating that both would eventually become rich and subject to external pressures.

When his term as South Australian Agent-General ended in 1971, he was made a Freeman of London.

== State politician ==
Milne was elected President of the South Australian Democrats in 1977 and was elected to the South Australian Legislative Council in September 1979, making him the first upper house member of the Parliament for the Democrats. Milne's 1979 election manifesto included policies supporting rural South Australians, subsidies on petrol, and the decentralisation of government. During his term, he served as the Parliamentary Leader of the South Australian Democrats. He introduced bills to ban cigarette advertising, supported environmental protection measures, opposed some state taxation measures, and spoke out against increases to parliamentarians' salaries. Milne also opposed the mining of uranium in Roxby Downs and stated that nuclear energy was "the most dangerous way of creating energy ever devised by mankind".

Milne retired at the 1985 election. He publicly disagreed with the party's choice to preselect Mike Elliott from the party's left faction as the party's lead candidate, ahead of Milne's preferred candidate from the right faction, Don Chisholm, and resigned from the party six days before the election.

== Later life and death ==
Milne was involved in local politics until his death. He was chairman of the South Australian branch of the Royal Life Saving Society from 1974 to 1995.

Towards the end of his life, Milne was very ill and was diagnosed with cancer.

He organised a meeting of Partnership SA to defend small businesses in December 1995. Due to illness he could not attend this meeting. In February 1996, Deputy Premier Stephen Baker told a story about Milne from November 1995: "We had the annual general meeting of the Royal Life Saving Society, of which Lance was President... He came down with Joan for that night to say hello to the people he had worked with and supported, having harassed and harangued the government to gain better results for one of his favourite organisations. Lance was so ill that he should not have been out of bed, but he attended that meeting. That story epitomises Lance Milne, the man, who had tremendous inner strength and who had enormous regard for his fellow human beings".

Milne died of cancer at his home in Stirling on 27 December 1995. He was survived by his wife, three children and nine grandchildren. Milne was an expert and collector of Chitons, and he donated his collection to the South Australian Museum.
