= Semaphore Library =

Heritage listed public library in South Australia

- Semaphore Town Hall, circa 1937
- Interactive map of Semaphore Library
- 34°50′19″S 138°28′53″E
- Location: 10-14 Semaphore Road; Semaphore SA 5019

History
- Built: 1884

Site notes
- Architect: Wright and Reed
- Governing body: City of Port Adelaide Enfield

South Australian Heritage Register
- Type: State Heritage Place
- Designated: 1 September 1983
- Reference no.: 2984

The Semaphore Library is a public library in Semaphore, South Australia. It was formerly the Semaphore Institute, Semaphore Town Hall, Ozone Theatre, and Semaphore Cinema, and is heritage-listed on both the state and national registers.

== Institute and town hall ==
The building was constructed as the Semaphore Institute, an early mechanics institute, and opened on 15 March 1884. It was designed by architects Wright and Reed, and built by Williams & Cleave. It was a stone building with an iron roof, with a main hall and stage, entrance room, library and reading room on the ground floor, and offices for the local municipality, the Corporate Town of Semaphore, and a gallery on the second floor.

In 1889, it was sold to the municipality to be used as the Semaphore Town Hall. The municipality merged with the adjacent Corporate Town of Port Adelaide in 1900, but it continued to be rented out for community events by the Port Adelaide council.

From 1910 until around 1912 or 1913, the hall was used as a temporary cinema by a number of organisers while continuing to be used for other community functions. These included the Greater Wondergraph Company, whose screenings were referred to as the Semaphore Wondergraph; Ozone Theatres Ltd; and the People's Concert and Picture Company.

During the First World War, the All-British League held meetings and recruitment drives at the town hall.

== Cinema ==
In 1929, the town hall underwent extensive renovations to designs in Art Deco style by architect Christopher Arthur Smith and converted into a cinema, opening as the Ozone Theatre on 9 December. It included orchestra and balcony-level seating. It includes a proscenium 15 ft (4.6 m) in width and a stage 40 ft (12 m) in depth, and was equipped with a RCA sound system. Smith was a prominent architect of the period, designing many theatres and cinemas, and a number of public buildings including a refurbishment of the Brighton Town Hall.

The company later became Ozone Theatres, and would become one of the two major movie chains in South Australia. In 1951, Hoyts bought out the Ozone company, and in 1952 undertook a complete refurbishment of the Semaphore Cinema, reopening on 20 November as Hoyts Ozone Theatre. However, box office takings suffered from the introduction of television, and Hoyts closed the cinema on 21 May 1960.

In 1966 the stalls area was converted into a youth club (Semaphore Youth Club), which included a boxing ring (closed in 1978). In December 1977, a small cinema opened in the former dress circle, known as the Semaphore Cinema and run by Alan and Fran Hall. This ran until 1 June 1985, after which the building was boarded up.

The building was vacant from 1985 to 1993, when the City of Port Adelaide restored the building as the Semaphore Library, which opened on 11 February 1994.

== Heritage listing ==
The building, located at 14 Semaphore Road, was listed on the South Australian Heritage Register on 1 September 1983, and was also listed on the Register of the National Estate.

The building remains substantially intact from its previous uses, and its state heritage listing notes that "enough interior elements of both periods [as a cinema] remain for it to be quite a significant representative of suburban cinemas in their heyday".
