= F. Kenneth Milne =

Australian architect (1885–1980)

Frank Kenneth Milne
- Born: 18 July 1885; Adelaide, South Australia, Australia
- Died: 3 October 1980 (aged 95); Adelaide, South Australia
- Occupation: Architect
- Spouse: Hazel Muir Fotheringham
- Children: Lance Milne
- Practice: F. Kenneth Milne & Evans; F. Kenneth Milne, Evans & Russell; F. Kenneth Milne, Dawkins & Boehm; Others
- Buildings: South Australian Brewing Co. Woodards House; Arbury Park (later Raywood); Sunnyside, North Adelaide, his own residence Ozone Marryatville remodelling

Frank Kenneth Milne (18 July 1885 – 3 October 1980), usually referred to as F. Kenneth Milne, was an Australian architect based in Adelaide, South Australia. He was regarded as one of the leading architects in the state in 1920, and continued to design buildings even in retirement. He went into partnership with a series of other architects over the course of his career, including John Richard Schomburgk Evans, (Note: John Richard Schomburgk "Jack" Evans (14 February 1892 – 26 June 1948) was born in Brompton, South Australia, a son of Dr John Herbert Evans (died before 1914) and Hermine Rosalie "Rosie" Evans (née Schomburgk, daughter of Dr Richard Schomburgk) who married on 8 April 1891, of Grange Road, Hindmarsh, later of Northcote terrace, Medindie. He was educated at St Peter's College and enlisted with the 1st AIF in September 1915, served with 18th Battery, 6th Field Artillery Brigade. He was awarded the MC for action at Mont St Quentin on 2 September 1918. He married Jocelyn Bowman (born 1904), daughter of Edmund Bowman (perhaps died 1921), on 4 April 1934.) Charles Alexander Russell, and Rolfe Vernon Boehm. He is also known for his work as a cinema architect, having been the appointed architect for Ozone Theatres in the 1930s.

He and his wife established the Kenneth and Hazel Milne Travelling Scholarship at the University of Adelaide in 1958. Several of his designs survive today, with many heritage-listed, including Woodards House in Waymouth Street, Adelaide, the remodelled Regal Theatre in Kensington Park, and his own home in Stanley Street, North Adelaide.

== Early life and education ==
Frank Kenneth Milne was born on 18 July 1885 in the eastern Adelaide suburb of Tusmore, the seventh of eight children of land agent John Milne and his wife Lucy Edith Macgeorge. His grandfather was Sir William Milne.

He attended both private school and state schools at Glenelg and North Adelaide. His art teacher at Mrs Kingston's school in Glenelg, Mary Overbury, taught him drawing.

== Career ==
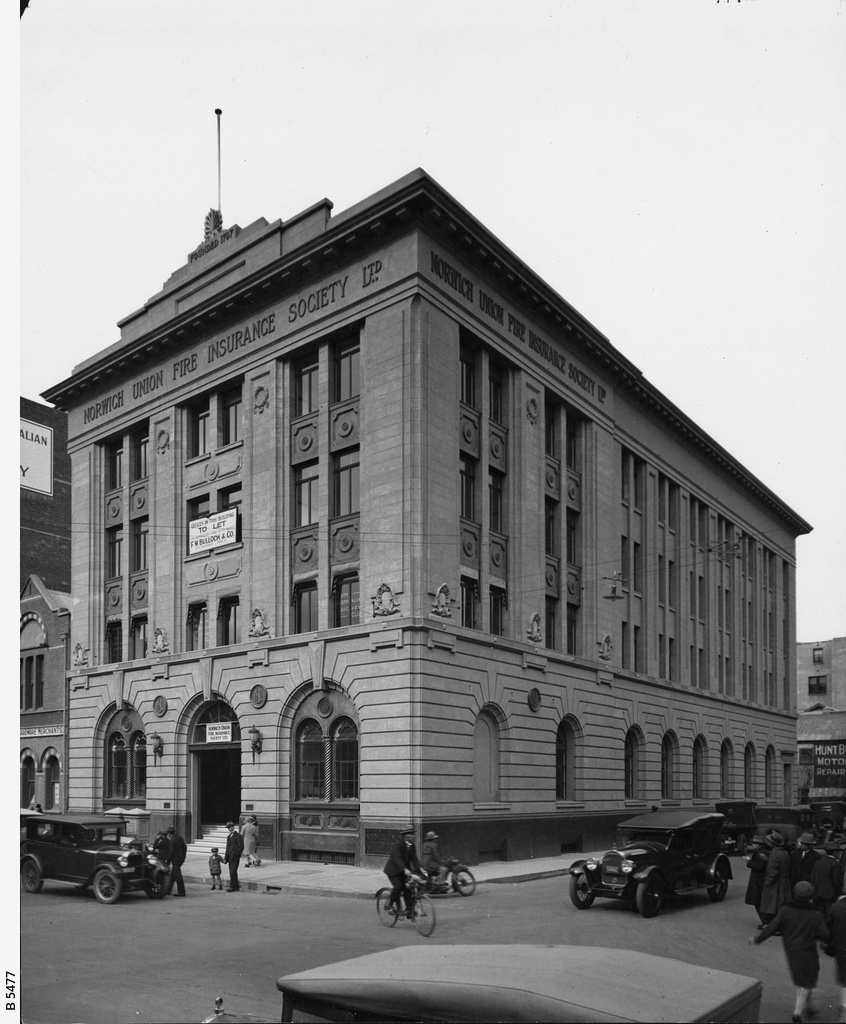
Woodards House, formerly Norwich Union Building, Waymouth Street, Adelaide, built 1929

Milne was articled to the Adelaide architect Alfred Wells (Note: Wrongly named as William Alfred Wells in ADB.) from 1903 to 1906, being taught there by chief draftsman Stuart Clark.

In 1906 Milne moved to Sydney, and worked as a draftsman with G. B. Robertson & T. J. Marks for three years.

After returning to Adelaide in April 1909, he set up a practice in Grenfell Street. His style became more and more eclectic, using elements of Art Nouveau, Beaux Arts Classicism, Art Deco, Gothic, and Italian Renaissance architecture. He designed many types of building, including banks, hotels, churches, houses, and picture theatres.

From 1912 until 1946, he was contracted to the South Australian Brewing Company to supervise their building works.

In 1920 John Richard Schomburgk Evans joined his practice (F. Kenneth Milne and Evans), and in 1925 Charles Alexander Russell joined them, becoming Milne, Evans, and Russell. The practice was dissolved in early 1930.

By the 1920s Milne was regarded as one of the state's leading architects. In October 1928, architects Milne, Evans, and Russell submitted their plans for extensions and alterations to the Crown & Anchor Hotel in Grenfell Street. The work was completed in 1929, with the alterations costing £5,000. In 1928-9 Milne (then in practice as Milne & Evans) designed and supervised construction of an office building at 47-49 Waymouth Street, Adelaide, known as the Norwich Union Building (later Woodards House), for Norwich Union Fire Insurance Society, which Milne regarded as one of his finest works. In the same year, the firm designed a large extension to the Kensington Gardens Bowling & Tennis Club.

In 1933-4 Milne travelled to Europe on a study tour, and was impressed by Georgian architecture, especially that of John and James Adam.

In 1934, he was commissioned by Ozone Theatres as sole practitioner to design the rebuild of the Victor Theatre at Victor Harbor, after a fire. He was then was appointed architect for all of their South Australian projects until about 1942, when the war intervened. Ozone was a family-owned company that became the largest in South Australia. The Victa Cinema was particularly significant in the history of cinema architecture in the state, as the buildings adapted to "talkies" and architectural design embraced the principles of Streamline Moderne, a form of Art Deco. The design of the Victor had considerable impact on future new cinemas, both in modern architectural expression and with its planning for both sightlines and acoustics in the new era of talkies. More attention was also paid to concealed lighting, ventilation, and gathering spaces for patrons.

In 1936, he designed a home for his own family, at 229 Stanley Street, North Adelaide, called "Sunnyside". The home was state heritage-listed on the South Australian Heritage Register on 11 September 1986.

In 1941, he was engaged to do an extensive remodelling of the Ozone Marryatville (now the Regal Theatre, Kensington Park). The then Chelsea Cinema was state heritage-listed on 24 March 1983.

Later associates in his practice, from the late 1940s onwards, included L. C. Dawkins and Rolfe Vernon Boehm (1946); Russell Stuart Ellis (1947); F. P. Bulbeck (by 1957); J. R. N. Twopeny (1960); and James Hodge (by 1964).

=== Practice names ===
Milne's practices operated under the following names: (Note: Note that contemporary firm Kenneth Milne Architects of Wyatt Street, Adelaide, appear to have no connection with F. Kenneth Milne.)

- F. Kenneth Milne (1909–1920)
- F. Kenneth Milne & Evans (1920–1925)
- F. Kenneth Milne, Evans & Russell (1925–1930)
- F. Kenneth Milne (1931–1946)
- F. Kenneth Milne, Dawkins & Boehm (1946–1947)
- F. Kenneth Milne, Dawkins, Boehm & Ellis (1947–1955)
- F. Kenneth Milne, Boehm, Ellis & Bulbeck (1956–1959)
- F. Kenneth Milne, Boehm, Bulbeck & Partners (1960–1961)
- F. Kenneth Milne, Boehm, Twopeny & Moss (1961–1963)
- Milne Boehm Twopeny & Hodge (1963–1973)

== Other activities ==
Milne was president of the South Australian Institute of Architects (SAIA) from 1937 to 1939. He promoted the architectural profession in public lectures, and was a co-founder of the school of architecture at the University of Adelaide.

He also belonged to the English-Speaking Union and the Liberal and Country League of South Australia.

He was a fit man, and belonged to the Adelaide Rowing Club, the Amateur Sports Club and the South Australian Rugby Union. He also played Australian Rules football, tennis and golf, and excelled at swimming and diving, earning trophies in these as well as rowing.

== Awards ==
- 1944: Inaugural SAIA Merit Award for Domestic Architecture, for Sunnyside
- 1953: Queen Elizabeth II Coronation Medal
- 1970: Life Fellow, Royal Australian Institute of Architects

== Personal life ==
On 12 March 1913 Milne married Hazel Muir Fotheringham (d.1968) at Chalmers Church (later Scots Church) on North Terrace. They had one child, Kenneth Lancelot Milne, who was founding president of the South Australian division of the Australian Democrats in 1977 and was elected to state parliament in the South Australian Legislative Council.

== Later life, death and legacy ==
Milne semi-retired in 1957, but continued to undertake alterations to buildings designed by him, and some work for old clients until he finally retired fully in 1973.

At the age of 91, Milne rowed on the River Torrens with three family members as crew. He died on 3 October 1980, aged 95, at Calvary Hospital, North Adelaide, and was cremated.

Milne and his wife Hazel gave £5000 to establish the Kenneth and Hazel Milne Travelling Scholarship in Architecture in 1958, which continues as of 2024. The scholarship, now worth A$20,000, is awarded to the selected "graduates of the Master of Architecture to travel and undertake study abroad and then return to Adelaide".

== Selected works ==
=== Norwich Union Building ===
In 1928-9 Milne (then in practice as F. Kenneth Milne, Evans & Russell) designed and supervised construction of an office building at 47-49 Waymouth Street, Adelaide, for Norwich Union Fire Insurance Society, which included ground floor offices for the Commercial Bank of Australia. Milne regarded this building as one of his finest works. The building contractor was prominent local builder Frederick Fricker, who died suddenly while on holiday, in Port Said, before the building was completed. The building was officially opened on 5 June 1929, after a dinner the previous night attended by many local dignitaries. Later renamed Woodards House, the building was state heritage-listed on the South Australian Heritage Register on 23 August 2013, and described as "an outstanding example of a building constructed in the Inter-War Commercial Palazzo style". An additional floor was added in 1953.

=== Other buildings ===
- Hampshire Hotel, Grote Street (1910)
- South Australian Cricket Association scoreboard, Adelaide Oval (1911)
- South Australian Brewing Co. (from 1912), "numerous hotels"
- Edments building, Rundle Street (1920s, with Evans & Russell)
- Crown & Anchor Hotel, Grenfell Street (1928–9, with Evans & Russell)
- Lister House, 196 North Terrace (1928–9, with Evans & Russell), for Peeks Limited, tailors, with rooms for doctors & dentists on upper floors; named after Joseph Lister, medical doctor who developed antiseptic surgery; building purchased by Commonwealth Oil Refineries in 1946; described as "Modern Gothic" and including a; renamed Tobin House 2002, (Note: shortly after the murder of Margaret Julia Tobin) later used as UniSA student accommodation
- Victor Theatre, Victor Harbor, rebuild (1934)
- Arbury Park, Bridgewater (1934), a residence for Sir Alexander Downer in the Adelaide Hills
- Sunnyside, North Adelaide (1936), his own home
- Goldsbrough Mort & Co. offices (1935) at 172-174 North Terrace, Adelaide; additional storey being in 1935–36; named Goldsbrough House, now serves as an entry to the Myer Centre; state heritage-listed in 1986
- Ozone Marryatville remodelling (1941)
- H. C. Sleigh Ltd offices (1955)
- Eringa, Unley Park, home of Sir Sidney Kidman
- Woolstores at Port Adelaide for Goldsborough Mort & Co.
- Several banks for the English, Scottish & Australian Bank
- Australian Mutual Provident Society offices at Clare
