= Semaphore, South Australia =

Semaphore
- Suburb
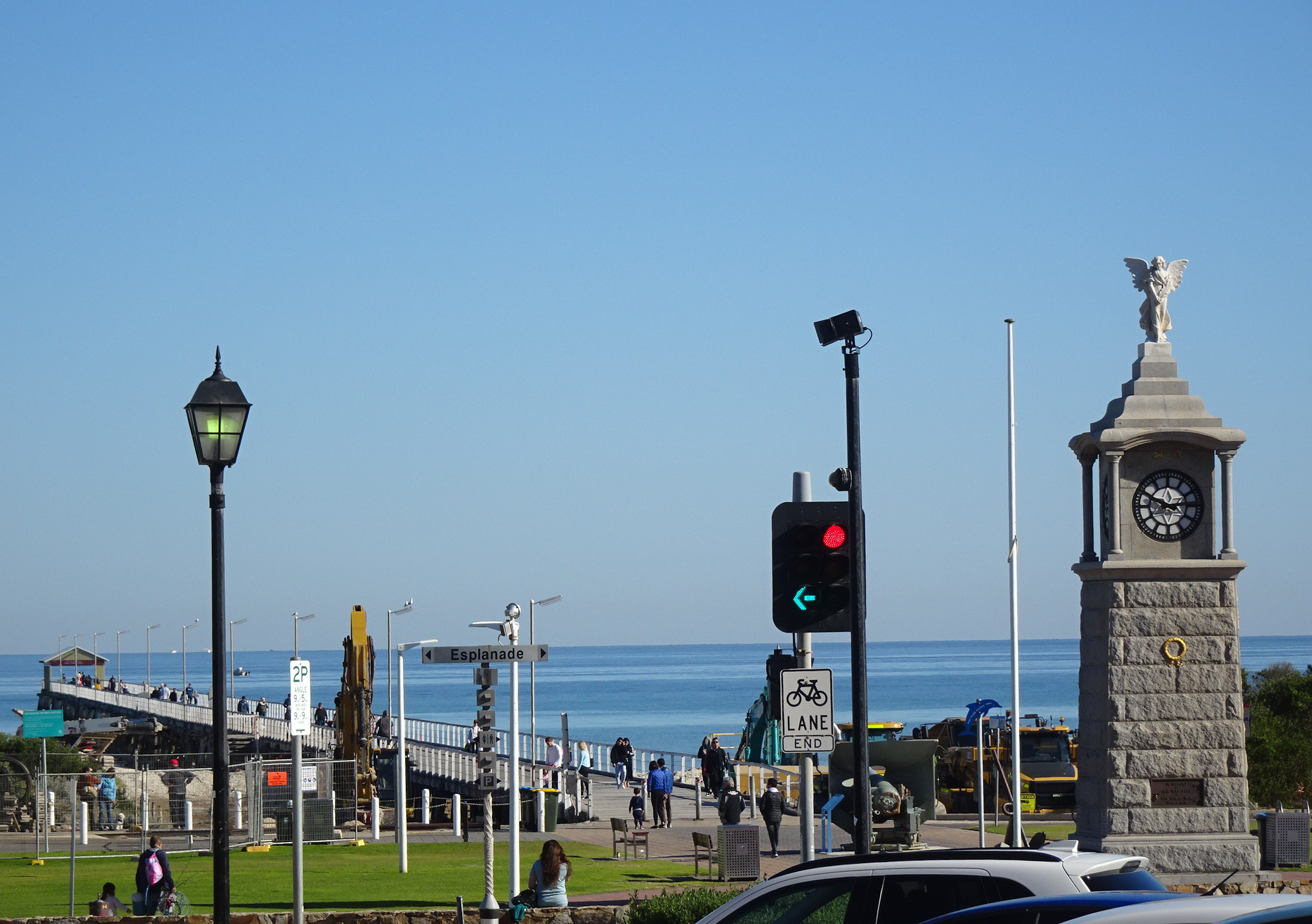
- Semaphore beachfront and jetty

- Interactive map of Semaphore
- Coordinates: 34.838781801759126°S 138.48360145726306°E
- Country: Australia
- State: South Australia
- City: Adelaide
- LGA: City of Port Adelaide Enfield
- Location: 14 km (8.7 mi) from Adelaide CBD
- Established: 1849

Government
  - State electorate: Port Adelaide
  - Federal division: Hindmarsh
- Elevation: 14 m (46 ft)

Population
  - Total: 2,749 (SAL 2021)
- Postcode: 5019
Suburbs around Semaphore
Gulf St Vincent	Largs Bay	Largs Bay
Gulf St Vincent	Semaphore	Exeter; Glanville
Gulf St Vincent	Semaphore South	Ethelton
- Coordinates; Adjoining suburbs

Semaphore is a northwestern suburb of Adelaide in the Australian state of South Australia. It is located on the Gulf St Vincent coastline of the Lefevre Peninsula about 14 kilometres (9 mi) from the Adelaide city centre.

== History ==
Semaphore was first surveyed for sale in 1849, at which time it was isolated by swamps to the south and the Port River to the east. In 1851, George Coppin, a prominent publican, theatrical entrepreneur and actor, built a two-storeyed timber hotel on the southern corner of The Esplanade and Blackler Street. A very high flagpole was erected to signal to his "White Horse Cellars" hotel at Port Adelaide the approach of ships, earning the area the name Semaphore, often called "The Semaphore".

In 1856, an official government signal station was established at the intersection of The Esplanade and Semaphore Road, where officers would record the details of all vessels in Gulf St Vincent. It was also used to record information on water depth, tides and cargo loading. A Telegraph Office opened in 1856 and became a Post and Telegraph Office in March 1871.

In 1875, the Time Ball Tower was erected adjacent to the Signal Station.

The area was isolated from Port Adelaide by the Port River until 1859 when a wooden bridge, later replaced by the Jervois Bridge, was opened. The following year saw the construction of the jetty.

In 1880, an octagonal brick tower with 2-metre (6 ft 7 in) thick walls was erected in Blackler Street to maintain a water supply when the Jervois Bridge had to be raised for passing ships. It was in use until 1972, after which it was converted into a residence.

The Corporate Town of Semaphore was established on 17 January 1884. This centralised the local governance of Semaphore and its surrounds, which formerly had been part of the Lefevre's Peninsula and Glanville councils on the north and south of Semaphore, respectively. Semaphore now forms part of the City of Port Adelaide Enfield.

In 1884 the Mechanics Institute was built, becoming the Semaphore Town Hall in 1889 (later Semaphore Cinema, and now the heritage-listed Semaphore Library).

The road link to Port Adelaide allowed for more convenient commuting from Semaphore to the commercial area, and contributed to increased residential development in the area, as well as churches, schools and pubs. This was further augmented by the construction in 1878 of a railway, which attracted affluent holiday-makers to the seaside. Carnivals, sideshows and open air cinemas were opened, and 1917 a tram service from Port Adelaide was built.

From around 1911 until 1919, an open-air theatre showing silent films used to operate in the summer on the Esplanade, run by the Wondergraph company, until the company built the Wondergraph Picture Theatre, opened in May 2020.

In 1928, a merry-go-round, the largest in Australia, was constructed, driven by an electrical lift motor and gearbox, unlike the predominantly steam-driven machines of the era.

In the mid-1930s, the Great Depression brought a decline to Semaphore, with the tram service being closed down and the functions of the Signal Station and Time Ball Tower being moved to Outer Harbor, while the jetty was shortened due to storm damage, with repairs being considered unaffordable.

== Description ==
Semaphore is bounded to the north by Union and Hargrave Streets, to the south by Hart Street, to the west by Gulf St Vincent and to the east by Woolnough Road and Swan Terrace. Semaphore is primarily a residential suburb, although its seaside location makes it a popular local tourist destination, with numerous restaurants, takeaway food outlets and other tourism-oriented businesses. It is adjacent to Semaphore South, Glanville, Exeter and Largs Bay.

== Landmarks ==
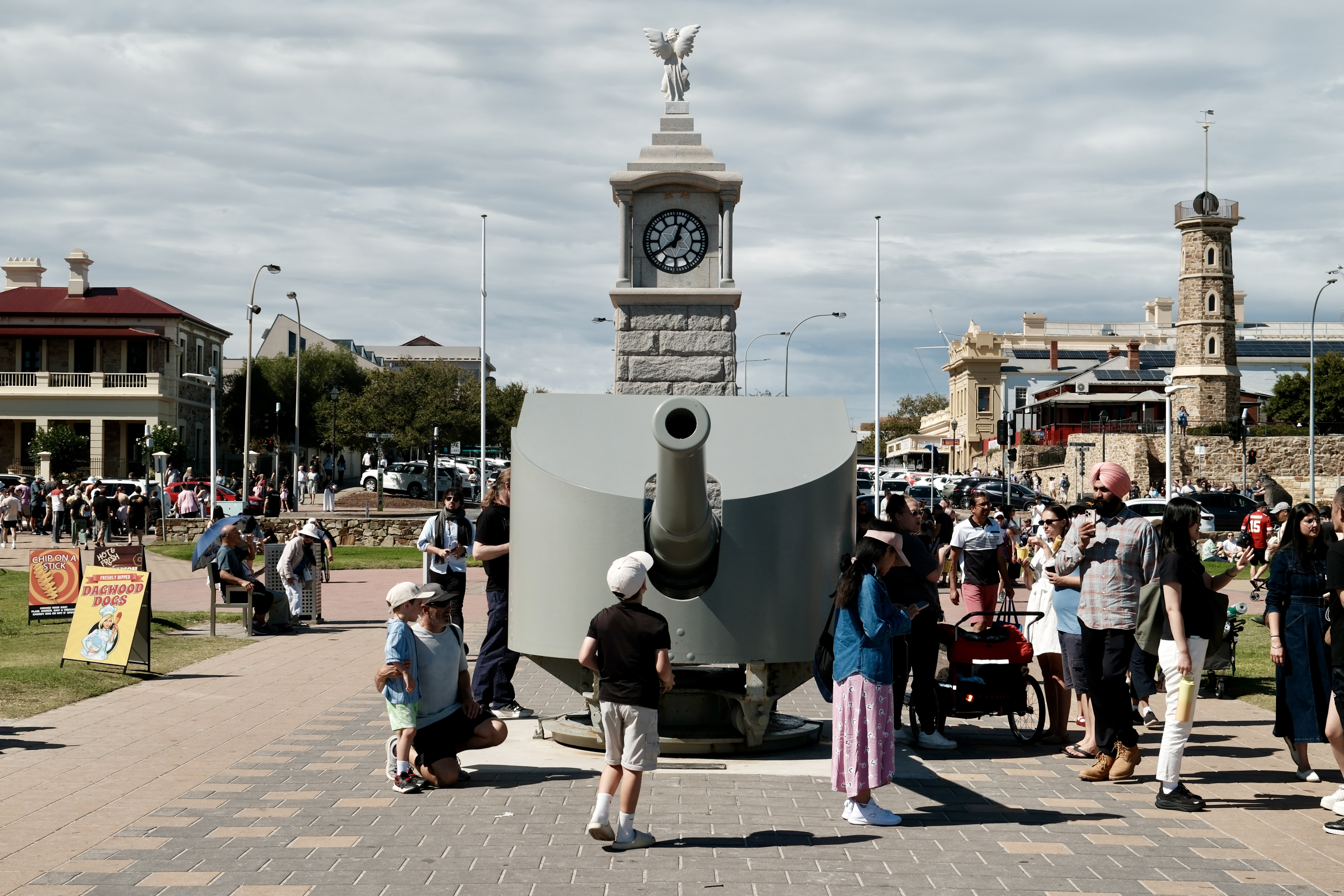
World War I memorial clock, dedicated in 1925

The Semaphore jetty, which was completed in 1860, once stood at 652 m (2,150 ft) in length, but today is 585 m (1,930 ft). It overlooks the Fort Glanville steam train, which operates as a heritage item by the National Railway Museum. A World War I memorial clock was built in 1925 at the landward end of the jetty.

The birthplace of Sir Ross Smith, the aviator who flew from the United Kingdom to Australia is preserved to this day at 36 Newman Street.

== Odeon Star cinema ==
The Odeon Star in Semaphore Road is the oldest purpose-built cinema in Adelaide, opened on 22 May 1920 as the Wondergraph Picture Palace. It was designed by a prominent South Australian architect, Eric McMichael, and built by Emmett Bros. It was renamed Star Theatre in 1930 (as part of the Clifford Theatre Circuit), and in January 1931, sound equipment was installed to cater for talkies.

After a takeover by Greater Union Cinemas in 1946 it was renamed to Semaphore Odeon Cinema from 12 June 1952, eventually closing on 13 November 1976 due to declining audiences, with the building converted into a furniture shop.

It was renovated and reopened as the Odeon Star on 19 December 1991, and enlarged and refurbished in 1997, becoming a three-screen cinema. It was part of the Wallis Cinemas chain for some time, but by 2009 was being run by independent operators.

== Facilities ==
Semaphore's beach is the busiest of those on the LeFevre Peninsula, as it is the most convenient beach to people living in the northern suburbs of metropolitan Adelaide. There are large car parks on the foreshore to accommodate visitors. During weekends of the summer months the beach is patrolled by the Semaphore Surf Life Saving club, with the swimming flags often being placed 50m south of the jetty or outside the club at Point Malcolm (1.5 km (0.93 mi) south of the jetty).

The beach is wide, with a large amount of wide sand. The surf is low and good for swimming, but surfing is generally not possible. Sandbars extend out a considerable distance, with holes, troughs and channels in the bars creating the major safety hazard on a generally safe beach. Other substantial hazards on the beach are jumping from the jetty (the depth of the water under the jetty varies considerably during the day and between visits) and non-swimmers climbing on the groyne at Semaphore South finding themselves cut off from land by a rising tide.

The jetty is the focus of cultural events such as the annual Kite Festival and Greek Festival.

The local public primary school is LeFevre Primary School in the neighbouring suburb of Birkenhead. The local high school is LeFevre High School in the neighbouring suburb of Semaphore South. The only school located in Semaphore is Dominican Primary School, a private school run by the Catholic Education Office. Another nearby faith-based private school is Portside Christian College in neighbouring Ethelton, a primary and secondary school.

Semaphore is served by the historic Semaphore Library, and Semaphore Road contains a large number of retail stores. Some are aimed at the large number of summer visitors, with a large range of food vendors, clothing boutiques and gift retailers. Semaphore Road was voted the People's Choice Award for best main street in South Australia for 2014.

The Odeon Star cinema runs regular programmes of films as well as special screenings for the Adelaide Film Festival.

== Heritage listings ==
Semaphore has a number of heritage-listed sites, including:

- 40 Blackler Street: Semaphore Water Tower
- Semaphore Road: Semaphore Soldiers Memorial Clock
- Esplanade: Semaphore Palais
- 64 Esplanade: Dwelling
- 68 Esplanade: Richard Jagoe's House
- 74 Esplanade: Semaphore Customs Boarding Station
- 176-186 Military Road: Bute Terrace
- 6 Newman Street: Dwelling
- Semaphore Road: Semaphore Jetty
- Semaphore Road: Semaphore Timeball Tower
- 10-14 Semaphore Road: Semaphore Soldiers Memorial Hall, designed by Christopher Arthur Smith.
- 10-14 Semaphore Road: Semaphore Library
- 15 Semaphore Road: Semaphore Post and Telegraph Office
- 43 Semaphore Road: Warrinilla

== Politics ==
Semaphore is in state and federal electorates that are considered historically "safe" Labor-held seats. This is a reflection of the working class heritage of the nearby docks of Port Adelaide, where the dock workers had a bitter struggle against shipping owners for reasonable terms of employment, wages, and safety. In the 1970s the docks were containerised and moved to Outer Harbor. The resulting unemployment and poverty in Port Adelaide entrenched the political appeal of Labor. Since the 1990s Semaphore has seen an influx of urban professionals, and whilst this diminished the Labor vote it did not increase the Liberal vote proportionally. In recent years the Labor margin of both seats has diminished due to new and expensive housing in West Lakes, Port Adelaide and New Port (a residential suburb created in 2007 on land once used by maritime facilities).

== Transport ==
The 157 and 333 buses have stops on Military Road. The 352 and 353 buses have stops on Semaphore Road.

The Glanville railway station is nearby, with a service to the Adelaide CBD every 30 minutes every day.

On-road cycling lanes are on most major roads, although operation of these is typically limited to peak hours. A separated cycling and walking path runs along the beach's foreshore. Another separated cycling and walking path forms a loop through Semaphore, Ethelton, Port Adelaide and New Port.

Some limited short stay car parking is available along Semaphore Road. Larger long-stay carparks stretch along the foreshore, with access from The Esplanade. Most residential streets have on-street parking available for non-residents, although in the older areas of the suburb many residents park on the street as houses of the pre-car era lack off-street parking.

== Notable people ==
- Susan Close, politician
- Mark Harrity, cricketer
- Frank Hatherley, broadcaster
- John Kosmina, footballer
- Colin Hayes, horse trainer
- Geoffrey Proud, artist
- Charles Todd, telegraph pioneer and meteorologist
- Brando Peričić, MMA fighter

== See also ==
- Semaphore (disambiguation)
- Semaphore railway line
- Electoral district of Semaphore
- Corporate Town of Semaphore
