= Kensington Park, South Australia =

Kensington Park
- Suburb
- Country: Australia
- State: South Australia
- City: Adelaide
- LGA: City of Burnside

Government
  - State electorate: Dunstan
  - Federal division: Sturt

Population
  - Total: 2,627 (SAL 2021)
- Postcode: 5068

Kensington Park is an eastern suburb of Adelaide in the City of Burnside in South Australia. It is bordered by Magill Road to the north, Glynburn Road to the east, Kensington Road to the south, and Gurrs and Shipsters Roads to the west.

It is home to the Regal Theatre (formerly Chelsea Cinema) and all three campuses of Pembroke School.

== Notable residents ==
- Cricketer Donald Bradman lived at 2 Holden Street from 1934 until his death in 2001.
- Clarrie Grimmett was a resident of Kensington Park, playing for the Kensington Cricket Club alongside Bradman in the 1930s.
