= Reussdale =

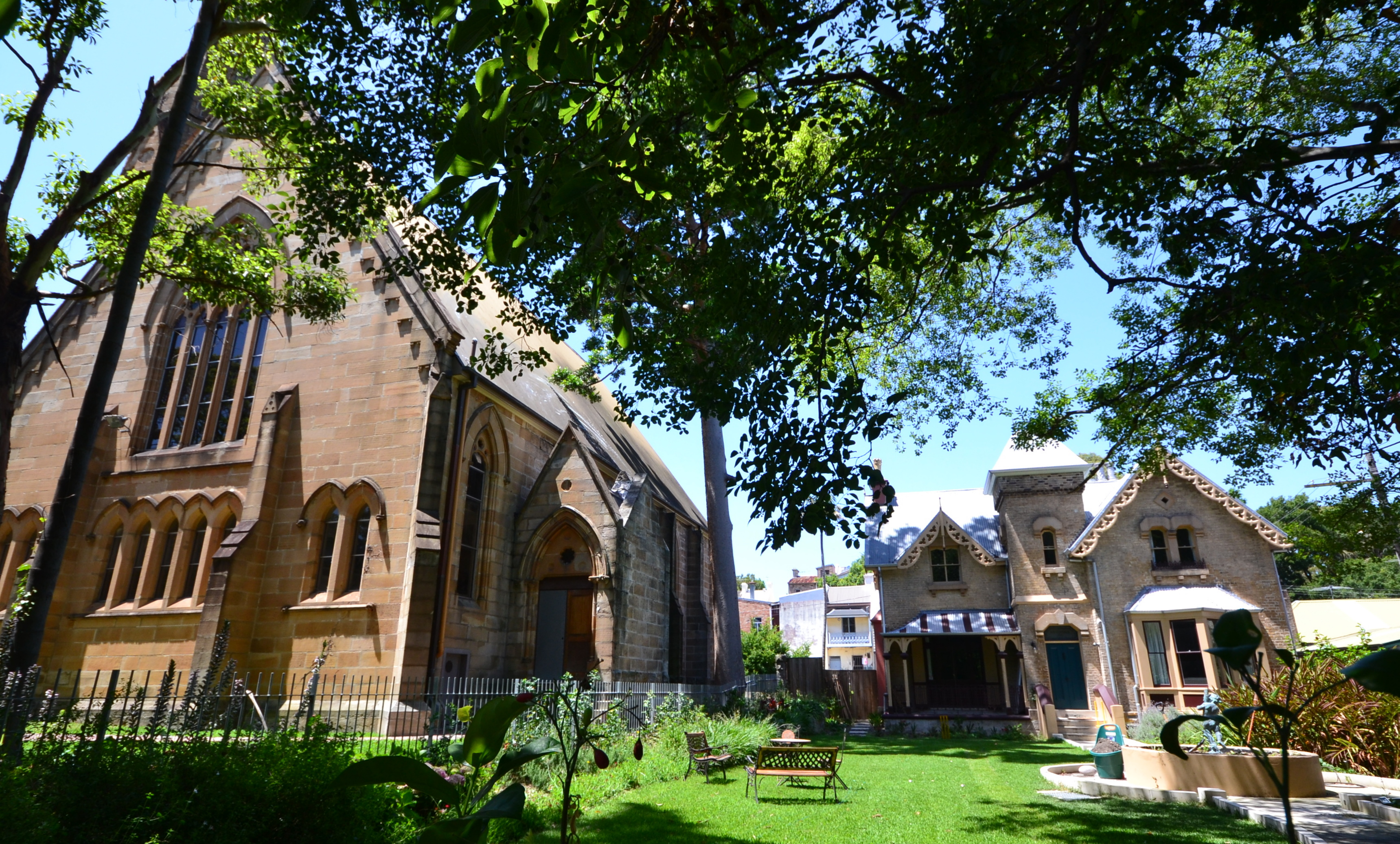
- Adjacent church (left) and Reussdale (right)

- Location within inner Sydney
- 33°52′52″S 151°11′07″E
- Location: 160 Bridge Road, Glebe, City of Sydney, New South Wales, Australia

History
- Built: 1868–1870

Site notes
- Architect: Ferdinand Reuss
- Architectural styles: Italianate; Free Gothic

New South Wales Heritage Register
- Official name: Reussdale; former Presbyterian Manse
- Type: State heritage (complex / group)
- Designated: 2 April 1999
- Reference no.: 292
- Type: Presbytery/Rectory/ Vicarage/Manse
- Category: Religion
- Builders: Ferdinand Reuss

Reussdale is a heritage-listed former private house and now function centre located at 160 Bridge Road in the inner western Sydney suburb of Glebe in the City of Sydney local government area of New South Wales, Australia. It was designed and built by Ferdinand Reuss from 1868 to 1870. It is also known as the former Presbyterian Manse. The property is privately owned. It was added to the New South Wales State Heritage Register on 2 April 1999.

It is regarded as possible the earliest example of High Victorian architecture in Glebe, with a mixture of Italianate and Free Gothic influences. Reussdale was listed on the (now defunct) Register of the National Estate.

== History ==
=== History of the area ===
The Leichhardt area was originally inhabited by the Wangal clan of Aborigines. After 1788 diseases such as smallpox and the loss of their hunting grounds caused huge reductions in their numbers and they moved further inland. Since European settlement the foreshores of Blackwattle Bay and Rozelle Bay have developed a unique maritime, industrial and residential character - a character which continues to evolve as areas which were originally residential estates, then industrial areas, are redeveloped for residential units and parklands.

The first formal grant in the Glebe area was a 162-hectare (400-acre) grant to Rev. Richard Johnson, the colony's first chaplain, in 1789. The Glebe (land allocated for the maintenance of a church minister) comprised rolling shale hills covering sandstone, with several sandstone cliff faces. The ridges were drained by several creeks including Blackwattle Creek, Orphan School Creek and Johnston Creek. Extensive swampland surrounded the creeks. On the shale ridges, heavily timbered woodlands contained several varieties of eucalypts while the swamplands and tidal mudflats had mangroves, swamp oaks (Casuarina glauca) and blackwattles (Callicoma serratifolia) after which the bay is named. Blackwattle Swamp was first mentioned by surveyors in the 1790s and Blackwattle Swamp Bay in 1807. By 1840 it was called Blackwattle Bay. Boat parties collected wattles and reeds for the building of huts, and kangaroos and emus were hunted by the early settlers who called the area the Kangaroo Ground. Rozelle Bay is thought to have been named after a schooner which once moored in its waters.

Johnson's land remained largely undeveloped until 1828, when the Church and School Corporation subdivided it into 28 lots, three of which they retained for church use. The Church sold 27 allotments in 1828 - north on the point and south around Broadway. The Church kept the middle section where the Glebe Estate is now. On the point the sea breezes attracted the wealthy who built villas. The Broadway end attracted slaughterhouses and boiling down works that used the creek draining to Blackwattle Swamp. Up until the 1970s the Glebe Estate was in the possession of the Church. On the point the sea breezes attracted the wealthy who built villas. The Broadway end attracted slaughterhouses and boiling down works that used the creek draining to Blackwattle Swamp. Smaller working-class houses were built around these industries. Abbattoirs were built there from the 1860s.

When Glebe was made a municipality in 1859 there were pro and anti-municipal clashes in the streets. From 1850 Glebe was dominated by wealthier interests.

Reclaiming the swamp, Wentworth Park opened in 1882 as a cricket ground and lawn bowls club. Rugby union football was played there in the late 19th century. The dog racing started in 1932. In the early 20th century modest villas were broken up into boarding houses as they were elsewhere in the inner city areas. The wealthier moved into the suburbs which were opening up through the railways. Up until the 1950s Sydney was the location for working class employment - it was a port and industrial city. By the 1960s central Sydney was becoming a corporate city with service-based industries - capital intensive not labour-intensive. A shift in demographics occurred, with younger professionals and technical and administrative people servicing the corporate city wanting to live close by. Housing was coming under threat and the heritage conservation movement was starting. The Fish Markets moved in in the 1970s. An influx of students came to Glebe in the 1960s and 1970s.

=== Reussdale ===
Ferdinand Reuss (1821–96) was active as an architect, builder and surveyor in Sydney in the 1870s and 80s. He trained as a civil engineer in the firm of Robert Stevenson, the great lighthouse engineer and grandfather of Robert Louis Stevenson. As a young man he spent some time with the New York-Erie Railway as Resident Engineer until the discovery of gold in Australia attracted him to Victoria in 1851.

He soon moved to Sydney, however, and set up as an architect at 134 Pitt Street. By 1863 he was living in Hereford Street, Glebe, and about 1865 bought two parcels of land on either side of the Pyrmont Bridge Road in the vicinity of Woolley Street: 76 metres (250 ft) on the eastern and 40 metres (132 ft) on the western side. On these he built cottages, most of which he rented.

On the east side he built The Hermitage (154 Bridge Road), in which he lived from 1866 until his death in 1896; Hamilton (156 Bridge Road), now behind the Presbyterian Church hall and in a derelict state (1972), which he named after Sir William Hamilton, a distant relative; Alma Villa (158 Bridge Road), which was demolished by the Presbyterian Church when they re-erected their church here in 1927; and Reussdale (160 Bridge Road). On the other side of Bridge Road Reuss appears to have built the house at no. 177, and his family later built Hamilton Lodge (also named after Sir William Hamilton) in Woolley Street.

Reussdale was built by 1871 and probably dates to the later 1860s. There were/are no wells on the property, there being one on an adjacent property. Ferdinand Reuss died in 1896.

In 1927 the Presbyterian Church demolished 158 Bridge Road (Alma Villa) and moved their (dismantled) church here, which had been formerly located on the corner of Glebe Point Road and Parramatta Road. During the 1960s there were fires in the Abbey building, with damage to roof and ceilings. The site was allegedly vacant since 1969. In 1977, the De Carlo Brothers purchase the property in a derelict condition and commence building works, creating lowered ceiling, restaurant and function centre, kitchen area in Abbey. They also construct a bitumen car parking area rear (south) of Abbey, over former clay tennis court in south-east corner of rear of Hamilton/the Abbey. This business ended c. 2003; the church, Reussdale and Hamilton all went into decline and became derelict.

By c. 2010, however, other parties had taken an interest in this notable group. Reussdale was restored and sold as residential accommodation; the abandoned church, which had been used by squatters, was also restored and offered for sale. Hamilton, which had deteriorated badly, was demolished.

== Description ==
The site is located on the southern side of Bridge Road, Glebe between Glebe Point Road to the east and Ross Street to the west. The site is rectangular in shape and has an area of approximately 3,362 square metres (36,190 sq ft). The site is large, the buildings more or less equally spaced with a well planted garden area in front. The site is currently occupied by the following three existing buildings:

1. Reussdale: A 19th century (c.1870) two storey Victorian Pictuesque Gothic Revival villa designed by Ferdinand Reuss, prominent architect and builder. The building has been vacant since 1969. It is in poor condition as a result of a fire, vandalism and lack of maintenance over the years. New corrugated iron roof and barge boards installed in 1996 (Original roof was tiles, by then in very poor condition);
2. The Abbey: A former Presbyterian Church originally constructed on the corner of Parramatta Road and Glebe Point Road in 1876. The church was demolished and re-erected at its current location in 1927–28. Since 1979 (until c.2003) the Abbey has been used as a restaurant and function centre. During the conversion process the walls were reinforced, a new roof and floor were installed, and a suspended ceiling. The Abbey is listed as a heritage item under the Leichhardt LEP2000; and
3. Hamilton Cottage: A nineteenth century Victorian style single storey brick cottage. Constructed in the 1870s as a small cottage by F. Reuss, it was later adapted for use as a community hall and school when the Presbyterian Church occupied the site. The building is in a poor condition. In particular, the interior has been modified extensively. The interior walls were removed, large steel tie beams were added and a large portion of the ceiling has fallen. Hamilton Cottage is listed as a heritage item under the Leichhardt LEP2000. It has creeping fig (Ficus pumila var. pumila) and clematis sp. creeping over the northern facade.

=== Setting ===
There is a large asphalt parking area at the rear of no.s 156 and 158 Bridge Road. Setbacks from Bridge Road are staggered. The former church is closest to the road alignment and Reussdale the furthest. The site is bounded by Hewit Avenue on the south-west and Reuss Street at the rear. Reussdale is built right to the Hewit Avenue boundary. There is a stone fence along the front boundary with a number of iron gates.

The relationship of the building to its neighbours contributes to its interest. The deep setbacks and generous grounds also provide a setting appropriate to the magnificence of the architecture. Whilst very little remains of the original gardens some of the site's trees appear to date back to the original construction. Presently they contribute to the Gothic atmosphere of the main frontage.

=== Reussdale ===
Built by 1871 and probably dates to the later 1860s. Planned as an asymmetrical cottage with a tower in the re-entrant angle above the entrance. The house possesses several unusual features such as the treatment of the walls. The back and side walls are rendered - the normal treatment of walls at this time. But the front of the house is of exposed, apricot-brown brickwork, speckled with crushed coal. And the unusual bay window features a triangular pointed frame unique in Glebe.

The decorative enframement of windows and doors is expressed with considerable vigour. The sandstone lintels are carved from one block to simulate segmental arches, some with prominent keystones. And they rest on prominent corbels with classical moulding. Wrought iron is used about the window sills, but cast iron has been avoided. The verandah posts are of wood with fretted wood brackets. The gables are carved elaborately.

The top of the tower contains a diagonal pattern of glass brick beneath the eaves, placed about a course of head? And sawtooth laid bricks. This interest in the colour and laying of bricks is unusual in Glebe at this time. The general vigour of the decoration, suggests Reuss had come into contact with the writings of Ruskin and Butterfield. Reussdale appears to be the earliest example of High Victorian domestic design in Glebe.

=== Landscape ===
Mature trees on site (from 1989 photographs in Perumal Murphy) include:

- Nettle trees (Celtis sinensis) - large one on eastern side fence of Hamilton, two in front of Abbey on Bridge Road fence, two large ones in north-west corner in front of Reussdale, several west of and close to the Abbey, two close to Abbey walls on eastern side, several at rear (south-west) on boundary behind Reussdale/Abbey
- Camphor laurel (Cinnamomum camphora), a large specimen on the front boundary fence in front of Hamilton
- Brush box (Lophostemon confertus) one on front fence to Bridge Road in front of Abbey, one closer to Abbey entry off north-east corner
- Leaning palm (Washingtonia robusta) on side fence between Hamilton & the Hermitage to the east
- Lord Howe Island palm (Kentia fosteriana) south-west corner of Abbey, predates it.

Trees probably post-1927 (or may be seedling regrowth of earlier trees on site):

- Queensland kauri (Agathis robusta), west of Abbey, possibly post 1927 (a species rare in Sydney today)
- Jacaranda, (J. mimosaefolia), on rear fence behind Reussdale/Abbey
- Two Lombardy poplars, (Populus italica Nigra), on west fence north of Reussdale, both cut down to stumps recently'
- Hill's weeping fig, (Ficus x hillii) close to front entry to Abbey'
- Illawarra flame tree (Brachychiton acerifolius) one on front fence north of Abbey, one inside front fence north of Reussdale
- Bay tree/sweet bay/laurel (Laurus nobilis), north-west of Hamilton, close to house'
- Lord Howe Island palm (Kentia fosteriana), in same location as bay tree, closer to house
- Oleander (Nerium oleander) south west corner of the Abbey (may predate it, may not)
- Wattle (Acacia sp.) south west corner of the Abbey - may predate it - unusual species, near end of lifespan
- Cocos Island or Queen palms (Syragus romanzoffianum), many planted between bays of Abbey walls, three planted in bitumen paving north of the Abbey towards Bridge Road.

=== Condition ===
As at 30 March 2004, although the building is still structurally sound the interior, especially, is in a very poor state. Unless remedial work is undertaken water damage also threatens the external brickwork. There is a large hole in the main roof which has resulted in major damage to one of the upstairs rooms. Much of the interior plasterwork has also deteriorated beyond repair. Fortunately the building remains capable of rescue, and there have been no major alterations which cannot be easily undone.

=== Modifications and dates ===
- 1927 – Presbyterian Church demolished 158 Bridge Road (Alma Villa) and moved a (dismantled) church here.
- Date unknown – stables/outbuildings behind (south of) Reussdale demolished.
- 1960s – fire in Abbey with damage to roof, ceilings.
- 1977/8 – conversion of Abbey to restaurant, bitumen sealing of rear of Abbey/Hamilton for carpark, replaced earlier clay tennis court and Hamiltons stables (which may have been long gone by then).
- 1996 – corrugated iron re-roofing of Reussdale, new timber barge boards and front verandah structure.

== Heritage listing ==
As at 30 March 2004, possibly the earliest example of High Victorian architecture in Glebe with some unusual features. Built by Ferdinand Reuss c. 1868. One of the most interesting and original of the Victorian picturesque Gothic style houses still standing in Glebe. It is of particular note for its association with Ferdinand Reuss, an active Sydney architect and builder from the 1860s to the 1880s. It forms part of a group developed by Reuss on this section of Bridge Road. The group is unified by its attractive streetscape, as well as by its historical associations with Reuss.

It is one of the most impressive buildings of its period. But for physical deterioration, and later additions to the rear, its fabric survives essentially unaltered. It is interesting for its marrying of Picturesque Gothic and Italianate influences and is a good early example of both. The building features the best materials available at the time and some of the most elaborate decoration. The exposed, apricot-brown brickwork is of special note, as is the unusual pointed bay window and the excellent stone and timber detailing.

The relationship of the building to its neighbours contributes to its interest. The building and its immediate neighbours are distinguished from later buildings in the street by their deep setbacks. The deep setbacks and generous grounds also provide a setting appropriate to the magnificence of the architecture. Although little remains of the original front gardens these setbacks, and the large trees surrounding, provide a suitable setting for such a grand architectural statement and contribute to the Gothic atmosphere of the main frontage. Some of the site's trees appear to date back to the original construction.

Interesting group of Victorian suburban villas of varied style (by the same architect) with generous mature gardens, around a contemporary (if not original) church. Numbers 160,154 and the church are particularly interesting architecturally. These houses and gardens, dominated by the former church and spire, form a leafy suburban precinct of great charm in spite of the present condition of the properties owned by the Presbyterian Church.

Reussdale was listed on the New South Wales State Heritage Register on 2 April 1999.

== See also ==
- Australian residential architectural styles
