= Glebe, New South Wales =

Glebe
- Suburb
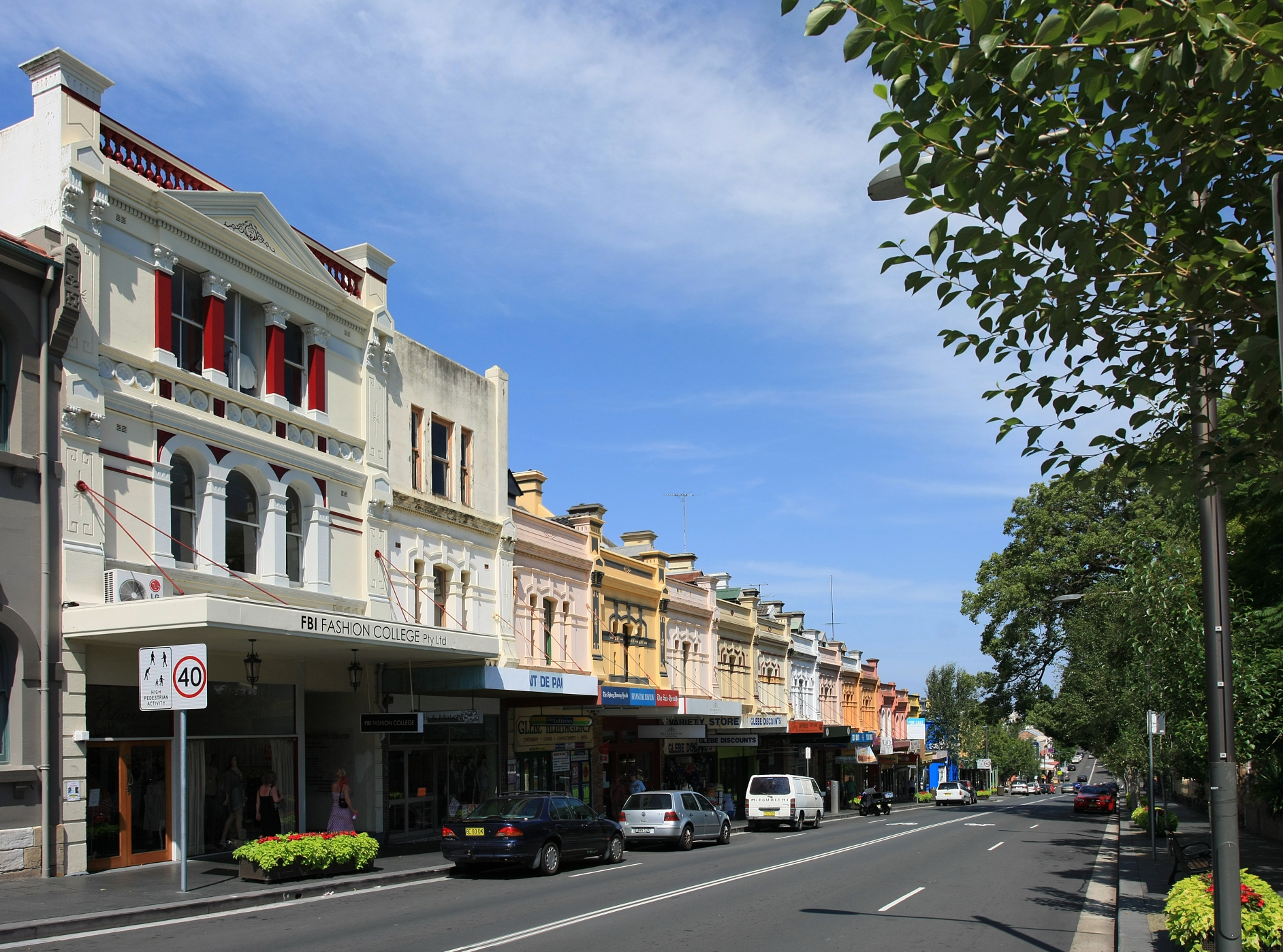
- Glebe Point Road

- Interactive map of Glebe
- Coordinates: 33°52′47″S 151°11′07″E
- Country: Australia
- State: New South Wales
- City: Sydney
- LGA: City of Sydney
- Location: 3 km (1.9 mi) south-west of Sydney CBD

Government
  - State electorate: Balmain
  - Federal division: Sydney

Area
  - Total: 1.69 km^{2} (0.65 sq mi)
- Elevation: 31 m (102 ft)

Population
  - Total: 11,680 (SAL 2021)
  - Density: 6,911/km^{2} (17,900/sq mi)
- Postcode: 2037
Suburbs around Glebe
Annandale	Blackwattle Bay	Pyrmont
Forest Lodge	Glebe	Ultimo
Camperdown	Broadway	Chippendale

Glebe is an inner-western suburb of Sydney in New South Wales. Glebe is located 3 kilometres (1.9 mi) southwest of the Sydney central business district in the Inner West region.

Glebe is surrounded by Blackwattle Bay and Rozelle Bay, inlets of Sydney Harbour, in the north. The suburb of Ultimo lies to the east and the suburbs of Annandale and Forest Lodge lie to the west. The southern boundary is formed by Parramatta Road and Broadway. Broadway is a locality sited along the road of the same name, which is located on the border of Glebe, Chippendale and Ultimo.

== History ==
Glebe's name is derived from the fact that the land on which it was developed was a glebe, originally owned by the Anglican Church. 'The Glebe' was a land grant of 162 hectares (400 acres) given by Governor Arthur Phillip to Reverend Richard Johnson, Chaplain of the First Fleet, in 1790.

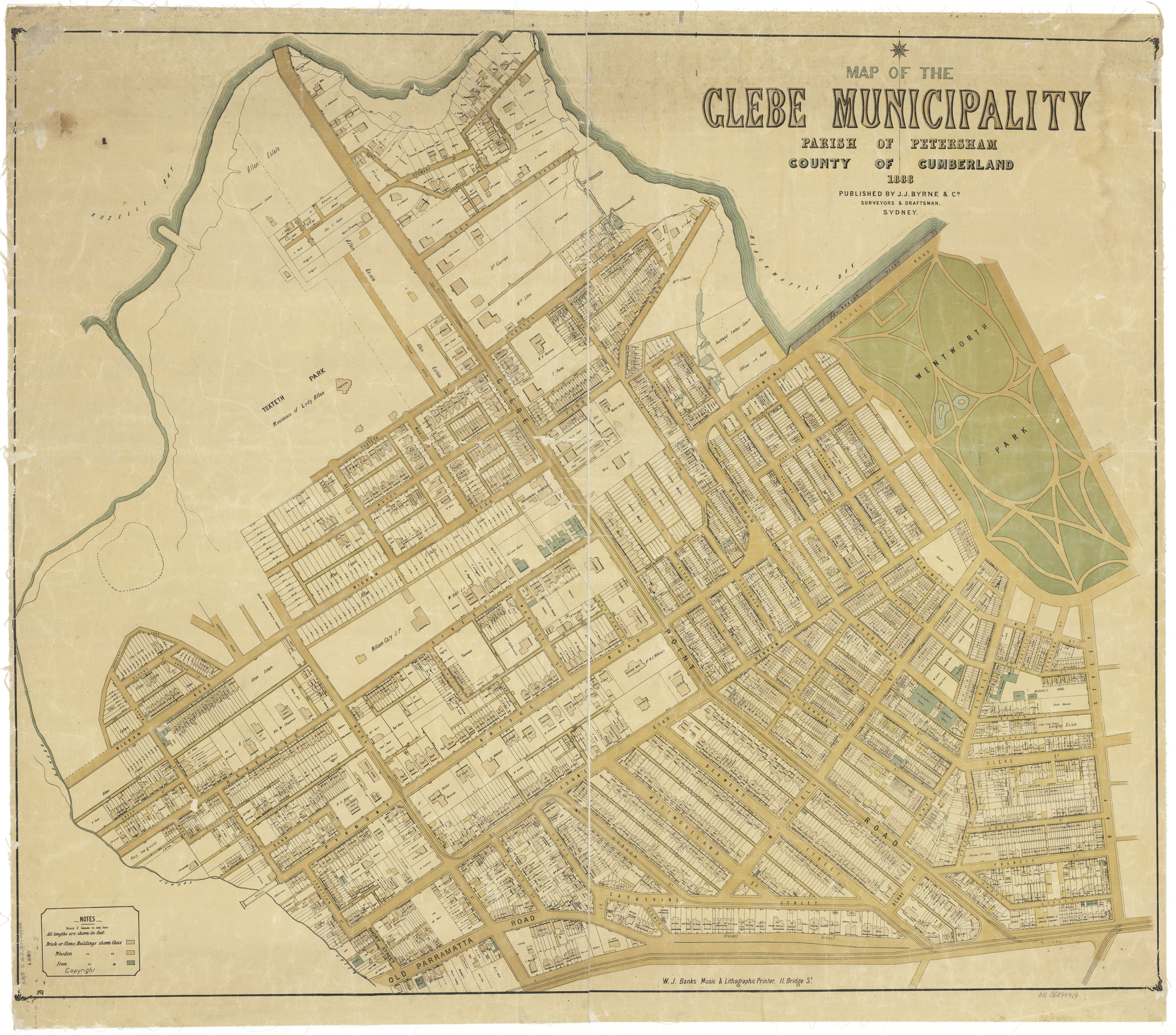
Map of the Glebe Municipality, 1888

Glebe is now much altered from the environment which was home to Aboriginal people of the Guringai tribe for thousands of years and which Europeans first saw soon after the settlement was established at Sydney Cove in 1788. Blackwattle Creek and Blackwattle Bay were discovered and named in 1789. Almost half of the Aboriginal population was killed by disease within the first few years of white occupation and survivors, with their traditional life shattered and increasing pressure put on their resources, retreated away from the principal settlement. It is likely that the relatively untouched area of Glebe provided some shelter but there are no known Aboriginal sites on or near the study area.

The area is based on a geology of sandstone with Wianamatta shale caps. The shallow sandy soil supported, on the ridge tops, robust forests of tall eucalypts and angophoras. Below was a shrubby under-storey that included acacias and banksias. The study area would have supported an environment of this type. Further down the ridges were black wattles, tea-trees and swamp oaks and these gave way at the marshy and muddy intertidal zone to mangroves. Blackwattle Bay extended in a rivulet to Parramatta Road, Wentworth Park occupies the reclaimed headwaters of this bay.

Governor Phillip made the observation that this land was:

"in general so rocky that it is surprising that such large trees should find sufficient nourishment but the soil between the rocks is good and the summits of the rocks ... with few exceptions are covered with trees most of which are so large that the removing them off the ground after they are cut down is the greatest part of the labour."

The land was not suited to farming because of its topography and soils and the first European associated with it, the Reverend Richard Johnson famously described his land as "four hundred acres not worth four pence". Despite its limited use for agricultural purposes the timber was a valuable raw material and by the 1820s at least a substantial portion of the land in the vicinity of the study area had been cleared and fenced ready for sale.

In 1790 Governor Phillip reserved approximately 162 hectares (400 acres) of land to the south and west of Blackwattle Creek as a Glebe devoted to supporting the Anglican Church. Reverend Johnson set about clearing it. He had few convicts to do so and considered the land poorly suited to agricultural purposes. In 1794 he exchanged his rights to this land for a separate grant. The Glebe land appears to have remained relatively untouched from this time until the 1820s.

In 1826 a Corporation was formed to administer all the lands reserved for clerical and educational use and income. This was the Clergy and School Lands Corporation. The Glebe land came under their authorisation as part of a Crown Grant made to the Corporation. The latter, being in a parlous financial situation, made the decision to sell this estate to generate income. The land was sold as two subdivisions at two separate auctions the second being on 7 May 1828. The Church sold 27 allotments in 1828 - north on the point and south around Broadway. The Church kept the middle section where the Glebe Estate is now. Up until the 1970s the Glebe Estate was in the possession of the Church.

On the point the sea breezes attracted the wealthy who built villas. The Broadway end attracted slaughterhouses and boiling down works that used the creek draining to Blackwattle Swamp. Smaller working-class houses were built around these industries. Abbattoirs were built there from the 1860s. When Glebe was made a municipality in 1859 there were pro and anti-municipal clashes in the streets. From 1850 Glebe was dominated by wealthier interests.

Glebe was home to the architect Edmund Blacket, who had migrated from England. Blacket built his family home, Bidura, on Glebe Point Road in 1858, designing it along conventional Victorian Regency lines. He also designed St John's Church, on the corner of Glebe Point Road and St Johns Road. The church was built from 1868 to 1870.

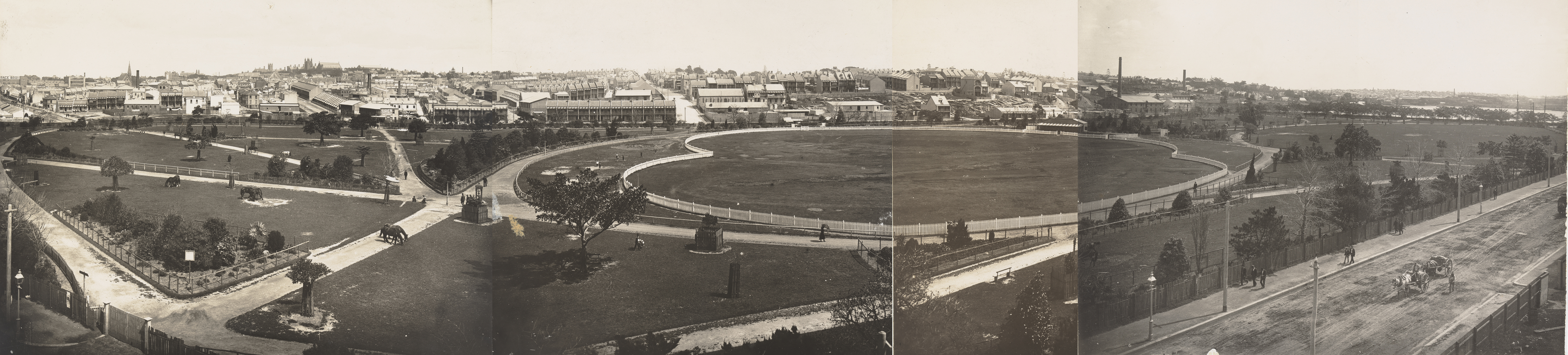
Panorama of Wentworth Park, Glebe, Sydney, c.1924

Reclaiming the swamp, Wentworth Park opened in 1882 as a cricket ground and lawn bowls club. Rugby union football was played there in the late 19th century. Glebe was home to a first grade football team in the New South Wales Rugby League. The Glebe Dirty Reds were formed in 1908 and played in the first seasons of rugby league in Australia, with home games at Wentworth Park. The foundation club did not win a premiership and was excluded from the competition in 1930. Dog racing started in 1932.

In the early 20th century modest villas were broken up into boarding houses as they were elsewhere in the inner city areas. The wealthier moved into the suburbs which were opening up through the railways. Up until the 1950s, Sydney was the location for working-class employment – it was a port and industrial city. By the 1960s central Sydney was becoming a corporate city with service-based industries - capital intensive not labour-intensive. A shift in demographics occurred, with younger professionals and technical and administrative people servicing the corporate city wanting to live close by. Housing was coming under threat and the heritage conservation movement was starting. The Fish Markets moved in during the 1970s. An influx of students came to Glebe in the 1960s and 1970s.

In the 1970s, feminist activists took over an abandoned terrace house in Westmoreland Street and set up Australia's first women's shelter, the Elsie Refuge. This was one of many properties left empty in the area due to government plans to build the North-East Expressway. The demolition of parkland and houses in Glebe was averted after the NSW Builders Labourers Federation placed bans on such work.

=== Original vegetation ===
The original vegetation was the Sydney Turpentine-Ironbark Forest. A veteran Ironbark still grows at the grounds of St John's Anglican Church, at Glebe Point Road.

== Landmarks ==
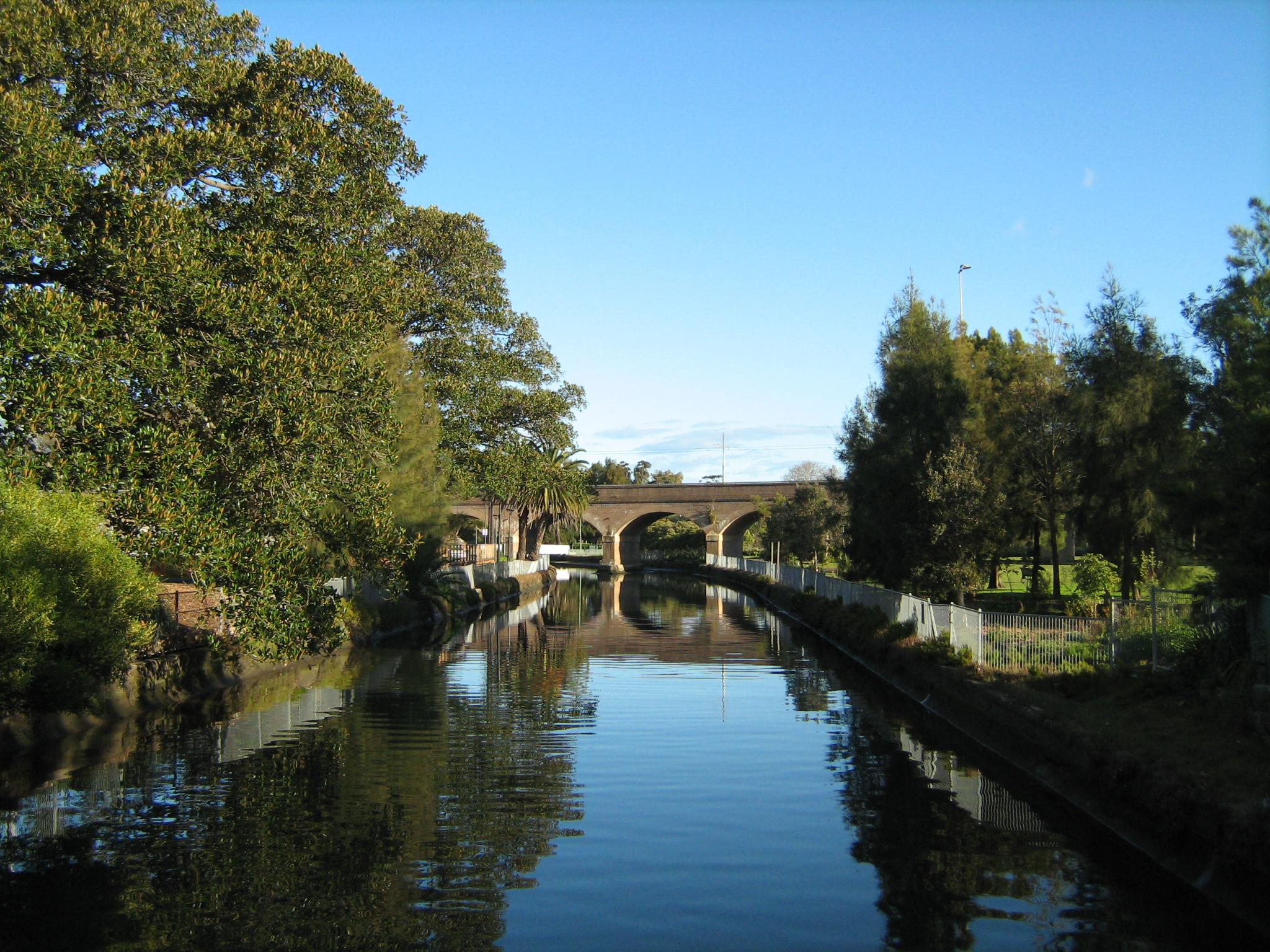
Johnstons Creek

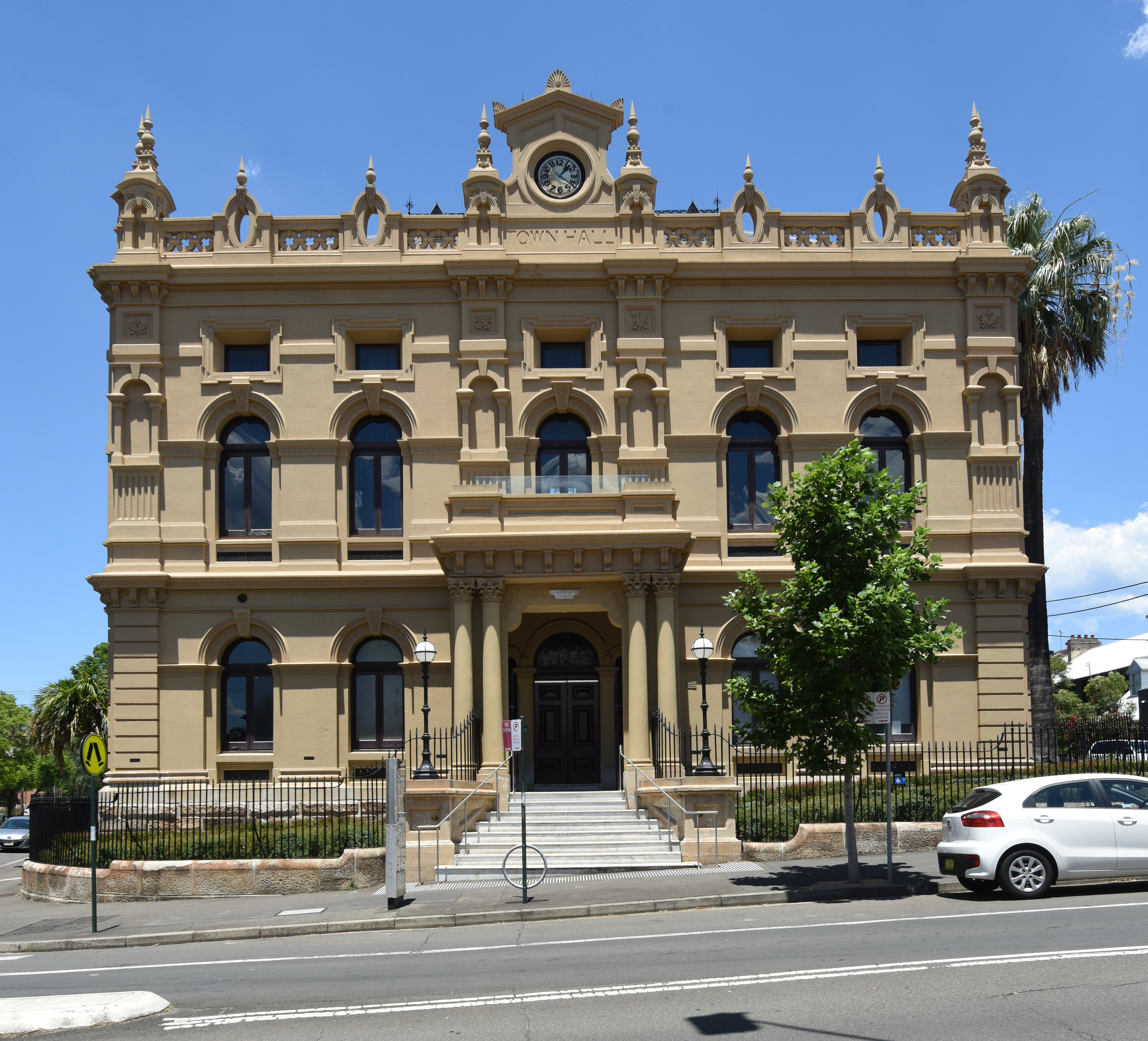
Glebe Town Hall, following its restoration, in 2018.

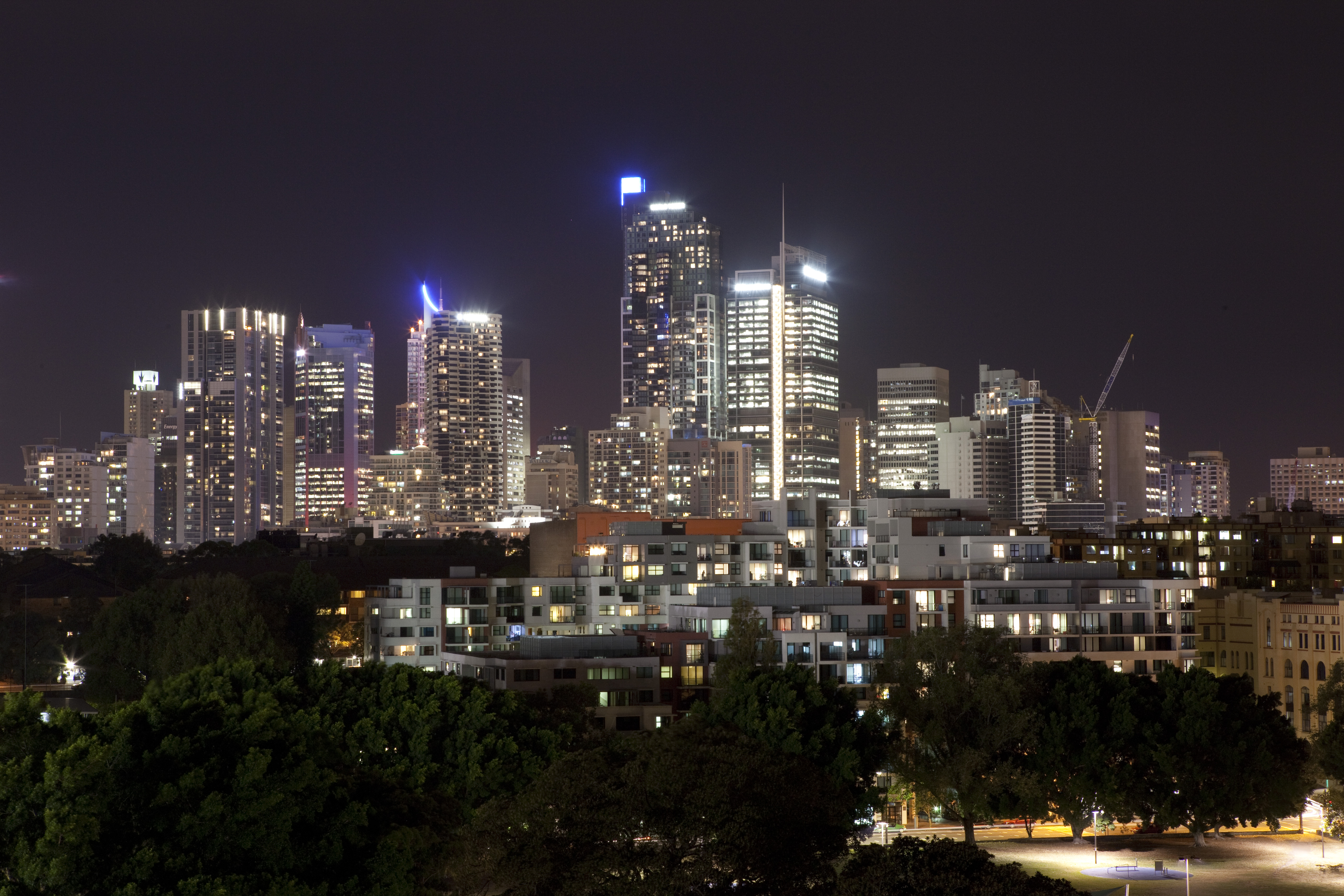
The Darling Harbour skyline at night from Glebe

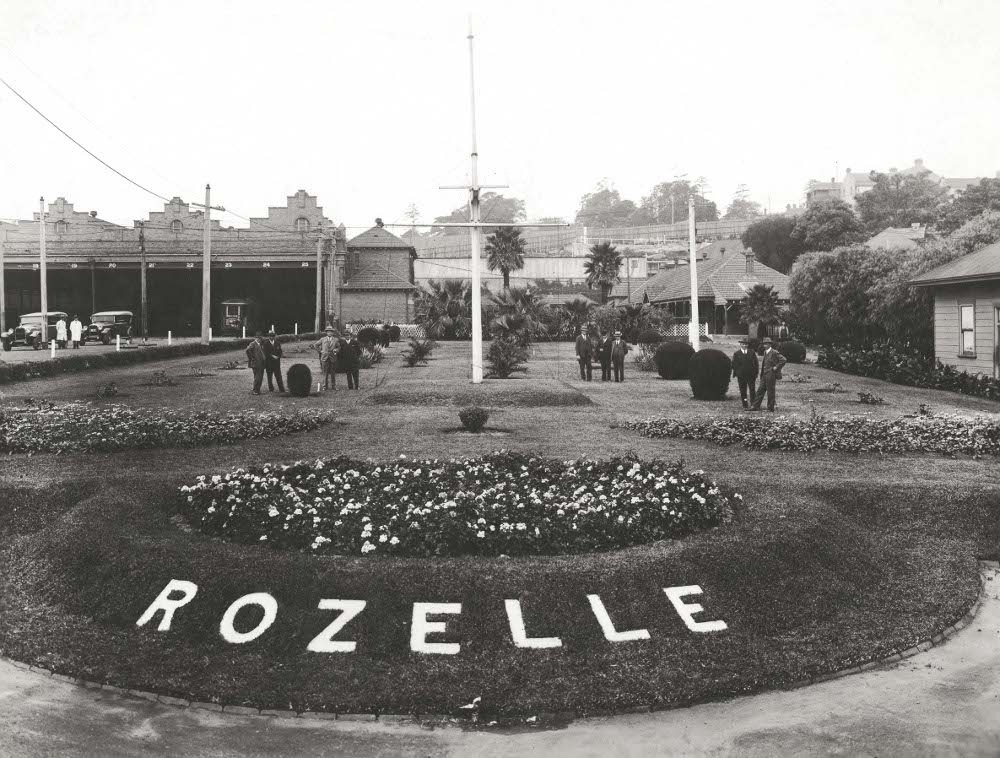
Rozelle Tram Depot c. 1929

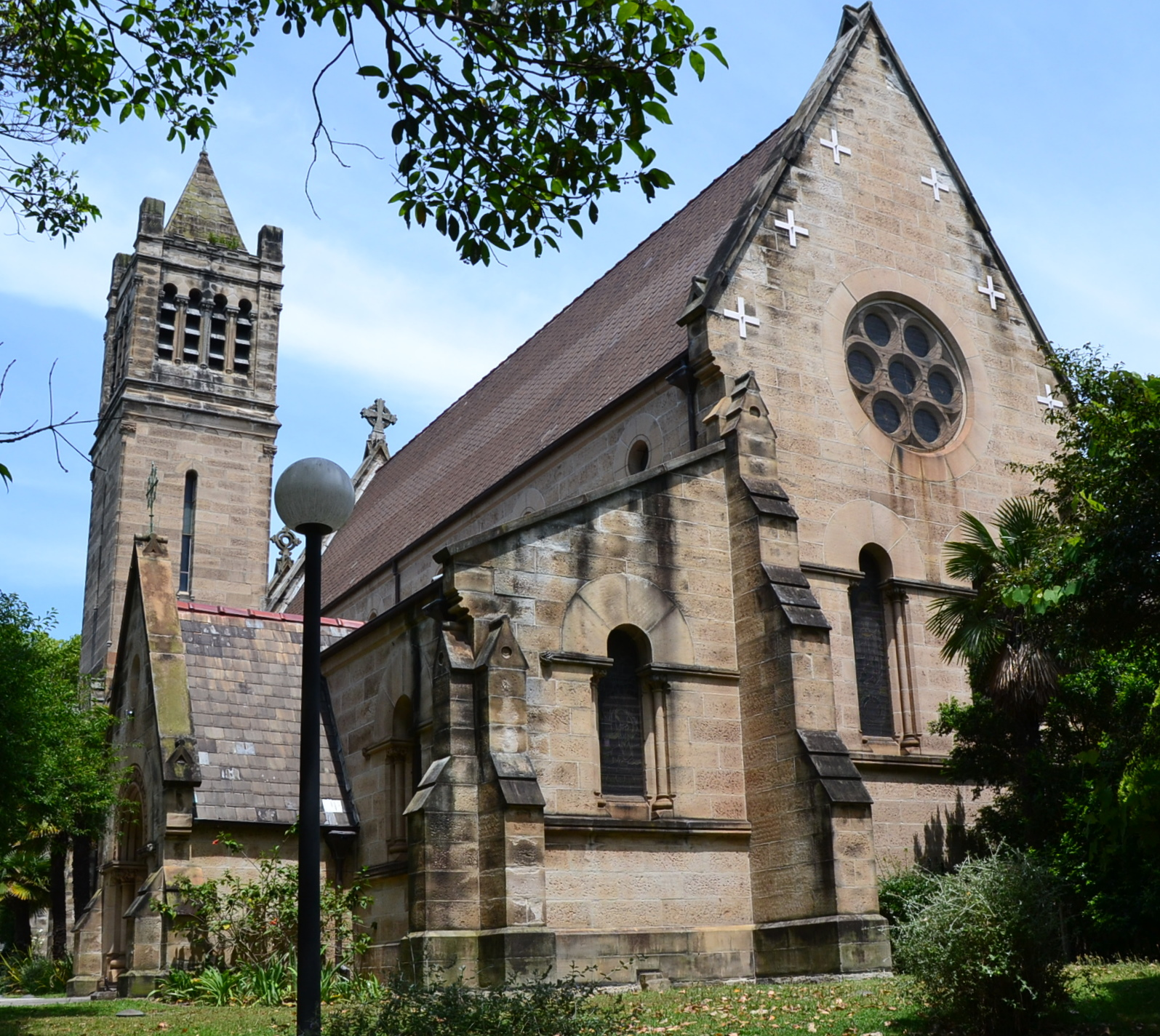
St John's Church with tower

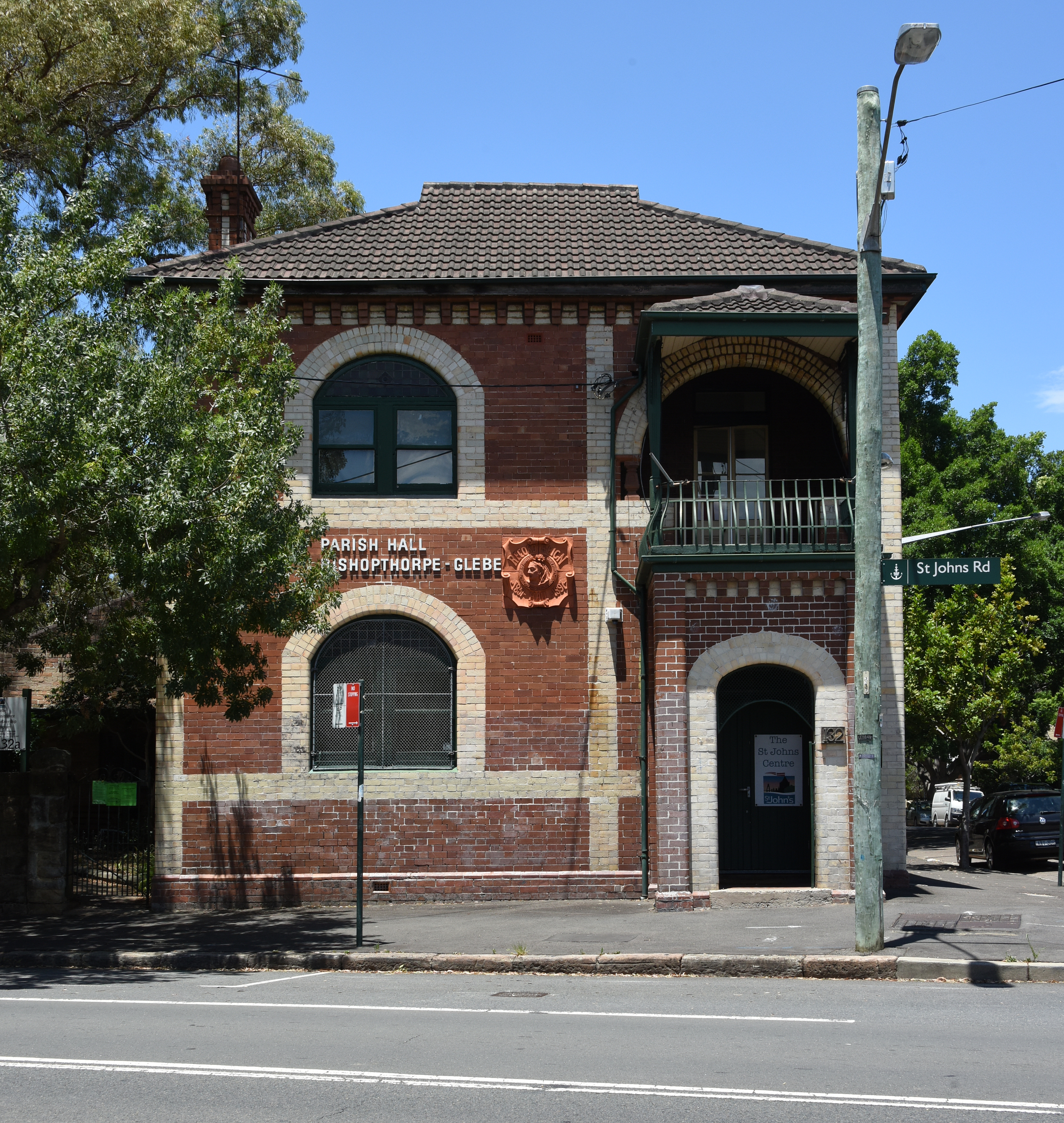
St Johns Parish Hall Glebe

- Glebe Town Hall, a heritage-listed civic building, which was used as the seat of the Glebe Municipal Council from its opening 1880 to 1948. Since merging with the City of Sydney council in that year, the building has been used extensively as a community hall for local concerts, rehearsals, balls, parties, conferences, and society meetings.
- Rozelle Tram Depot, constructed in stages from 1904, is the largest remaining tram depot in Sydney, and is one of five remaining tram depots in the state of New South Wales. Operations ceased on 22 November 1958. The depot at present contains six historic trams, some of which date back to the 1930s, as well as an old coach that has been heavily vandalised. The trams that were in near mint condition prior to 2000 have now been vandalised, stripped and painted with graffiti. The depot served the inner western suburbs tram routes to Leichhardt, Balmain, Birchgrove, Abbotsford, and Lilyfield. During its peak of operations the depot was a major place of employment, employing up to 650 staff and was one of few workplaces of significant size in the Glebe area during its period. The depot ceased operations on 22 November 1958.
- Sze Yup Temple (Chinese: 四邑廟) is located in Edward Street and was originally built in 1898 by Chinese immigrants from Sze Yup, Guangdong, China. It provided a focal point for the early Chinese market gardeners in the area and is still in use today. The present building, which replaced one destroyed by fire, dates from 1955. Arsonists caused another fire in January 2008, damaging the roof and all its contents. Racism and anti-Chinese sentiments just prior to Chinese New Year in February were suspected as motives, but police refused to confirm or deny this. While refusing to agree to community suspicions that the fire was racially motivated, in January 2009 the local council allowed reconstruction work as a sign of goodwill. The temple is heritage-listed.
- Bellevue, located in Blackwattle Park, was built in 1896 by Ambrose Thornley for prominent Glebe resident William Jarrett. It was later restored and turned into a café. Bellevue is heritage-listed.
- Bidura, situated on Glebe Point Road, was built by architect Edmund Blacket for his family. Built in 1857, the house may have been influenced by the design of the nearby Toxteth Park. It is heritage-listed.
- St Scholastica's (Toxteth Park), Glebe, Sydney George Allen, who established a legal firm and became Lord Mayor of Sydney in 1844, constructed the building as his home and called it Toxteth Park. St Scholastica's College moved to this site from Pitt Street in central Sydney in 1901. The building is heritage-listed.
- Lyndhurst This mansion was built between 1834 and 1837 for Dr James Bowman, who was the principal surgeon of the nearby Sydney Hospital. It was designed by the noted architect John Verge, in the Regency style. The building was resumed in 1972 with the intention of demolishing it as part of a proposed freeway project. However, it was saved as a result of public protest and the placing of a green ban, then handed over to the Historic Houses Trust of New South Wales in 1983. In 2004 it was sold and then returned to use as a private home. Lyndhurst is heritage-listed.
- Johnstons Creek rises in Stanmore and flows in a generally northward direction towards Rozelle Bay. The creek passes beneath the stands of the former Harold Park Paceway prior to emptying into Rozelle Bay at Bicentennial Park, Glebe.
- Glebe Jubilee fountain erected in 1909 on the corner of Glebe Point Road and Broadway commemorates the Jubilee of Glebe as a municipality.
- St John's Glebe, also known as St John's Bishopthorpe. Opened in 1870 it was designed by John Hunt and Glebe resident Edmund Blacket. The tower was added in 1909 by Blacket's son Cyril.
- St John's Parish Hall Glebe. Built in 1870 and designed by Edward Halloran. There is a horse trough near Glebe Point Road. The hall was used as a hostel during World War II as part of the Church of England National Emergency Fund's efforts to offer hostel accommodation in Sydney for armed services personnel visiting from the surround military barracks. The hall had 30 beds.

== Demographics ==
Glebe's population shrunk for much of the 20th century. It reduced from 22,000 in 1911, to 20,510 in 1947, and 13,601 by 1996.

At the 2021 census, 11,680 people were living in the suburb of Glebe, compared to 11,532 people at the 2016 census. At the 2021 Census, the Glebe - Forest Lodge SA2 contained 20,262 people.

In 2021, Aboriginal and Torres Strait Islander people made up 3.3% of the population. Of people attending an educational institution, 13.5% were in primary school, 10.8% in secondary school and 44.5% in a tertiary or technical institution. 57.0% of people were born in Australia. The most common other countries of birth were England 4.4%, China 4.0%, New Zealand 2.7%, Vietnam 2.2% and United States 1.4%. 68.2% of people only spoke English at home. Other languages spoken at home included Mandarin 4.4%, Vietnamese 2.7%, Spanish 2.1%, Cantonese 1.7% and Greek 1.0%. The most common responses for religion were no religion 51.6% and Catholic 15.6%. Of occupied private dwellings in Glebe, 47.2% were semi-detached, 46.0% were flats or apartments and 5.0% were separate houses. 61.4% were rented, 19.4% were owned outright and 19.4% were owned with a mortgage.

== Housing ==
It is popular with city-workers and students due to its proximity to the Central Business District as well as University of Sydney, the University of Technology Sydney, and the University of Notre Dame Australia. Glebe is a popular destination for backpacker tourism due to the bars and cafes of Glebe Point Road and the aforementioned proximity to the city. Glebe has one of the highest rates of inequality of Sydney suburbs.

In 1910, Glebe was said to be fully built out. It's population at the time was 22,000 in 1911 and 22,500 in 1915.

The "most hectic period of all" in Glebe's development was from 1871 to 1891. It population reached 21,943 in 1911.

The Glebe Society neighborhood association has been involved in advocacy since 1969. The Society's first newsletter flagged the problem of flats development as a pressing concern. Three-storey brick walk-up buildings were nicknamed "The red brick terror". In 1970 society members drew up a plan to address the issue of indiscriminate home unit building in Glebe.

=== Public Housing ===
Glebe is one of the major centres of public housing in inner-Sydney.

At its south-eastern end is the Glebe Estate, an area of Housing Commission properties, mainly consisting of low density affordable Victorian terrace houses (similar to the surrounding private houses), single cottages and small complexes, purchased by the government of Gough Whitlam as a massive urban renewal project to provide public housing for the needy. Some houses in the Glebe estate have been sold off to private real estate, including a high density tower block, and a large complex. This area has the third highest Aboriginal population in Sydney.

=== Heritage listings ===
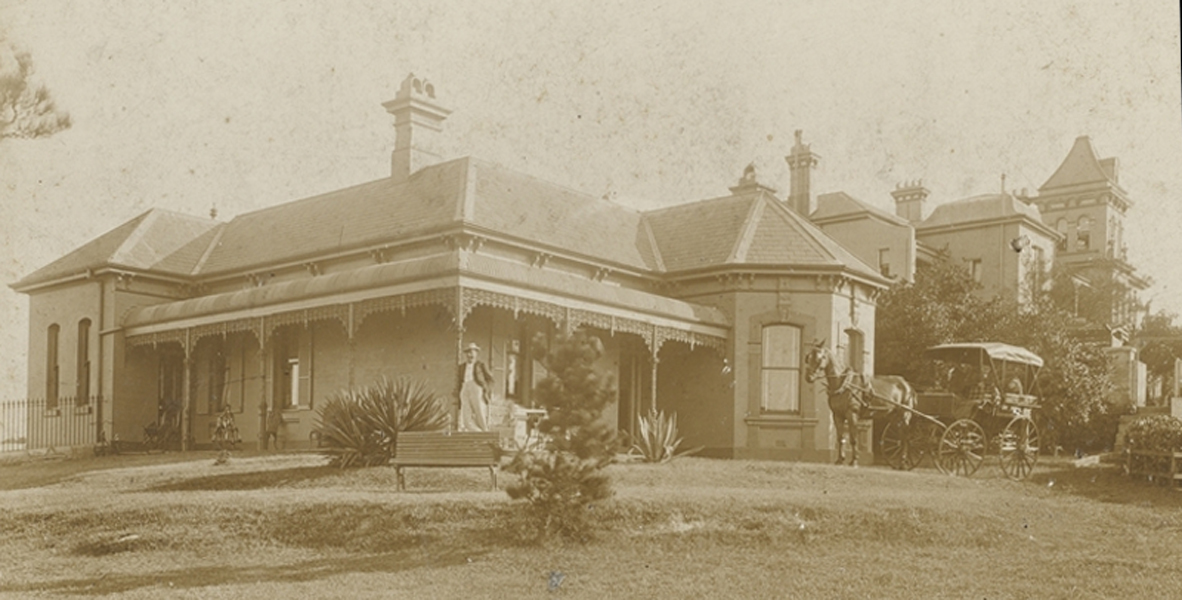
Bellevue, Glebe 1899. The large house behind is Venetia.

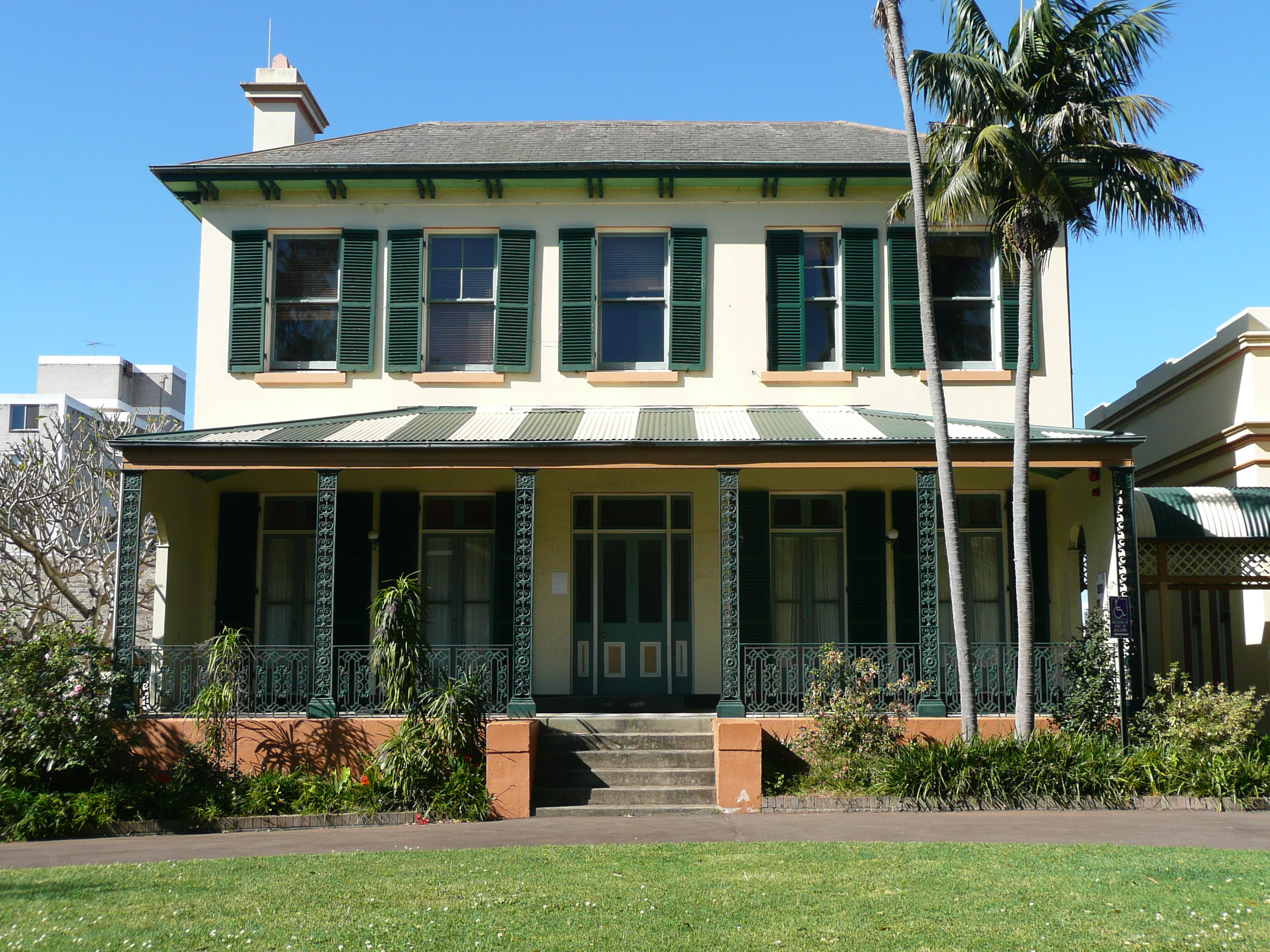
Bidura, pictured in 2009, the former home of Edmund Blacket.

Glebe has a number of heritage-listed sites, including the following sites listed on the New South Wales State Heritage Register:

- 55–57 Leichhardt Street: Bellevue, Glebe
- 160 Bridge Road: Reussdale
- 281–285 Broadway: University Hall and Cottages
- 61 Darghan Street: Lyndhurst, Glebe
- 24 Ferry Road: Rothwell Lodge and Factory
- 266 Glebe Point Road: Monteith, Glebe
- 357 Glebe Point Road: Bidura
- 53 Hereford Street: Hereford House
- 13 Mansfield Street: Tranby, Glebe
- Victoria Road: Sze Yup Temple
- Wentworth Park, Jubilee Park, Johnstons Creek: Glebe and Wentworth Park railway viaducts
- Metropolitan goods railway: Pyrmont and Glebe Railway Tunnels

The following buildings are listed on other heritage registers:

- St John's Anglican Church, Glebe Point Road
- Glebe Court House, Talfourd Street
- Glebe Police Station, Talfourd Street
- Former Glebe Town Hall, St John's Road
- Former Glebe Post Office, Glebe Point Road
- Emslee, Mansfield Street
- Margaretta Cottage, Leichhardt Street
- Hartford, Glebe Point Road
- War Memorial, Glebe Point Road

A number of heritage items were studied in the Glebe Point Road Main Street Study.

== Culture ==
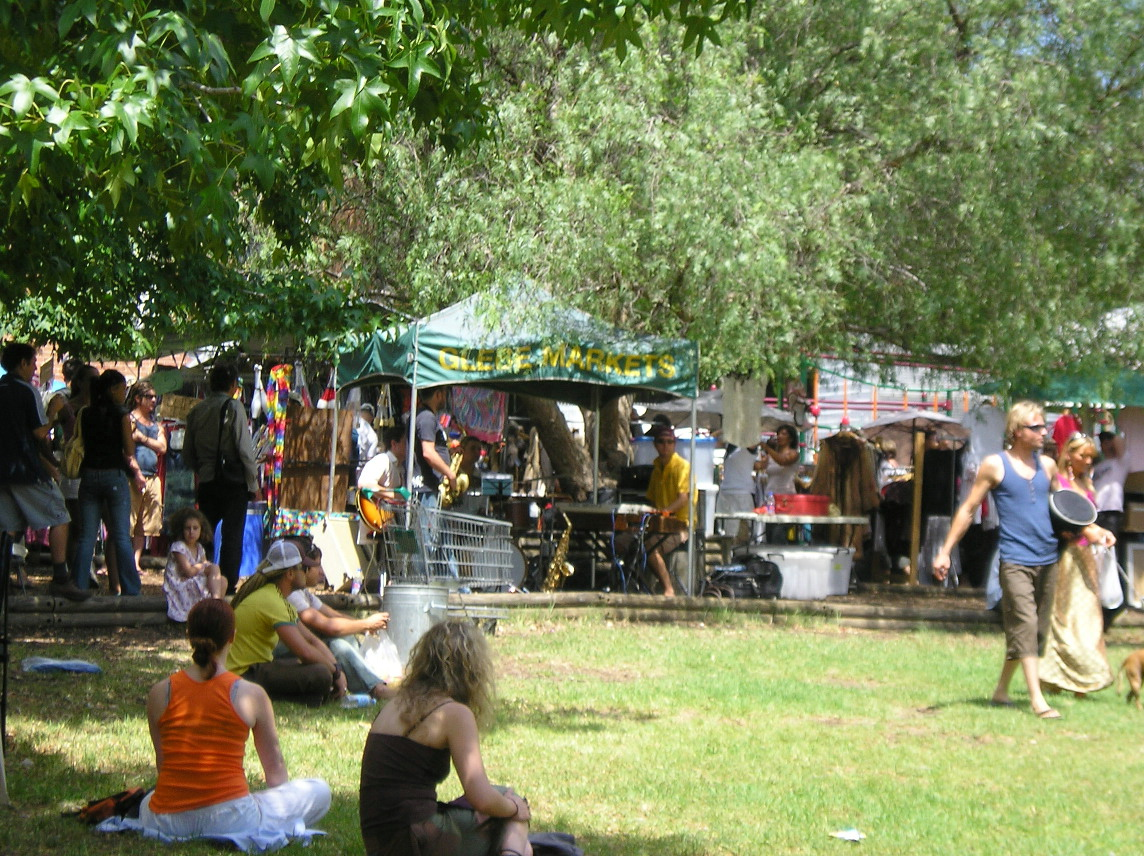
Glebe markets

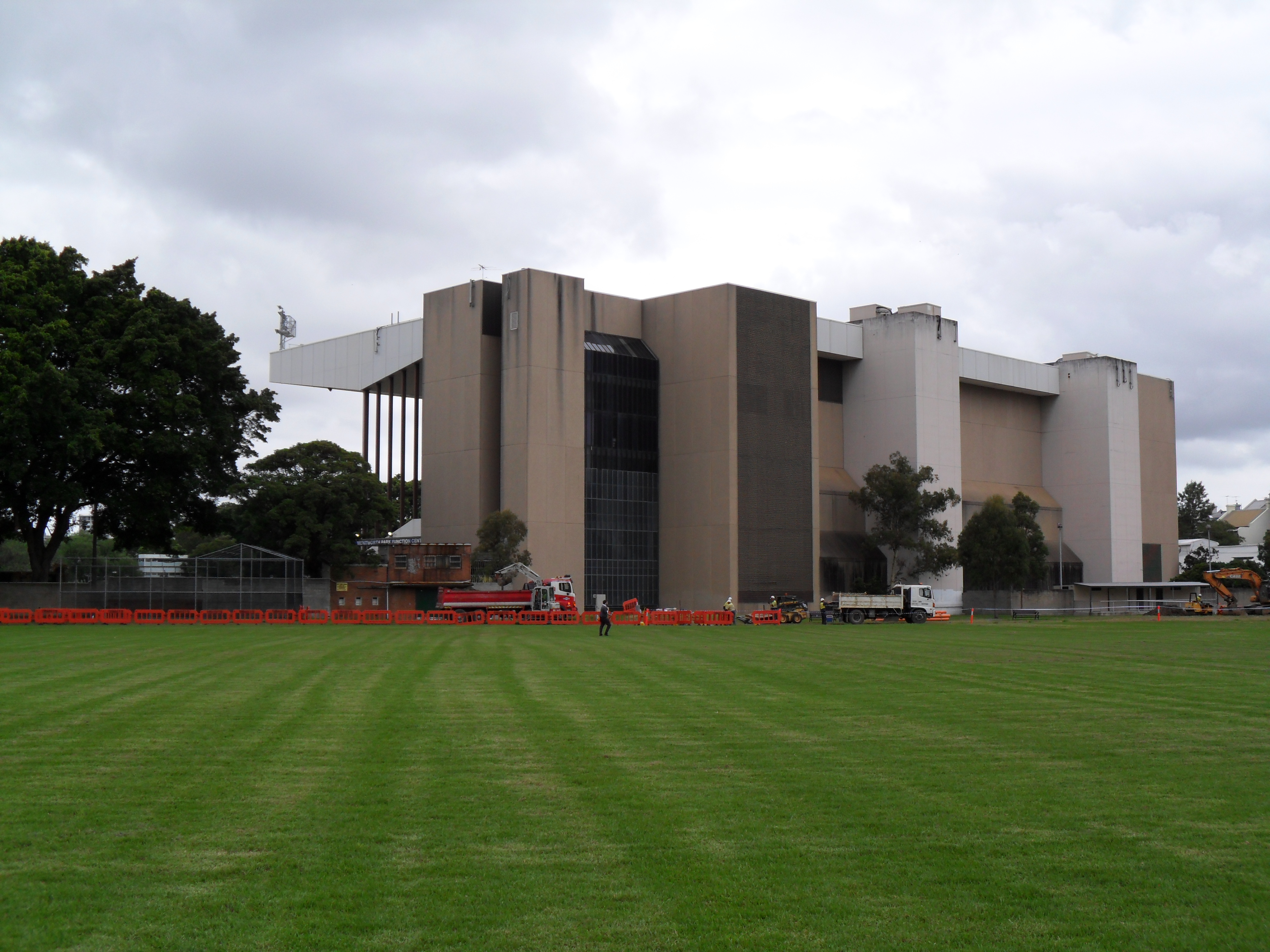
Wentworth Park

=== Commercial areas, restaurants and cafés ===
Glebe Point Road is the main road through the suburb, featuring a shopping strip, known for its specialty shops and cafés and for its variety of ethnic restaurants – Indian, Thai, Italian, Nepalese, Dutch-Indonesian, and other minority ethnic tastes.

Broadway Shopping Centre was built on the landmark site of the former Grace Bros department store. The shopping centre includes a food court and cinema complex, and completed a renovation in July 2007 which added a fourth floor.

Glebe has a popular market which is held on Saturdays in the grounds of Glebe Primary School. Arts, crafts, clothing and edibles are sold. They are known as the alternative markets for the alternative lifestyle goods that are offered. New and second-hand goods are sold there.

=== Sport and recreation ===
Wentworth Park, which features a greyhound racing track, is on the border with Ultimo.

Glebe mini skateboarding ramp is located in Bicentennial Park off Chapman road, in between Glebe and Annandale. The mini was originally 3.5-foot (1.1 m) tall with a hump in the middle. Circa 2005 the original mini was removed and replaced with a traditional 4-foot (1.2 m) ramp, sans hump. Balmain South Sydney Cricket Club play at Jubilee Oval in Glebe.

Glebe Dirty Reds compete in the Ron Massey Cup.

== Education ==
Schools in the suburb include Glebe Public School (on Glebe Point Road), St James Catholic School (on Woolley Street), Forest Lodge Public School (Bridge Road) and St Scholastica's College (on Avenue Road). The Blackwattle Bay Campus of Sydney Secondary College sits on the site of the old Glebe High School. Tranby Aboriginal College is located in a heritage-listed house, Tranby, in Mansfield Street.

== Transport ==
The Inner West Light Rail has two stations in the suburb, Glebe and Jubilee Park, with the journey from Glebe to Central railway station taking just under twenty minutes. Transit Systems route 431 runs from Martin Place via Elizabeth Street, Broadway and Glebe Point Road, terminating at Glebe Point. Route 433 runs from Railway Square, along Glebe Point Road and continuing to Balmain. Route 469 loops north along Glebe Point Road before running west towards Annandale, Lilyfield, and Leichhardt down Wigram Road, terminating at Leichhardt Marketplace Shopping Centre. Transdev John Holland route 370 runs from Glebe Point to Coogee via Newtown, Alexandria and the University of New South Wales.

== Notable residents ==
- Sir Edmund Barton (1849–1920), first Prime Minister of Australia (1901-1903), federationist and judge.
- Sir John Sydney James Clancy (1895–1968), judge.
- Toni Collette, actress, was raised in Glebe until age six.
- Eva Cox, author, sociologist, activist.
- Lucy Eatock (1874 – 1950), political activist, lived in Glebe. Her house was nominated for a blue plaque to celebrate her life here.
- Tim Ferguson, comedian, musician, author.
- Sir Norman Thomas Gilroy (1896–1942), Catholic cardinal.
- Ross Gittins, economist, journalist, author.
- Stan Grant, television presenter, journalist.
- Bessie Guthrie (1905–1977), designer, publisher, feminist and campaigner for children's rights.
- Tracey Holmes, journalist, sports broadcaster.
- James Francis (Frank) Hurley (1889–1962), adventurer, photographer, and film maker.
- Maynard, broadcaster, entertainer, event promoter.
- Reg Mombassa, musician, artist, entrepreneur.
- James Bradfield Moody, author, engineer, executive.
- Ernest Ridding (1927–2001), well known locally as 'The Fridge Man', Ridding's community service was honoured by the Governor of New South Wales.
- Patricia Easterbrook Roberts (1910–1987), floral designer.
- Leigh Sales, television presenter, journalist, author.

== Gallery ==
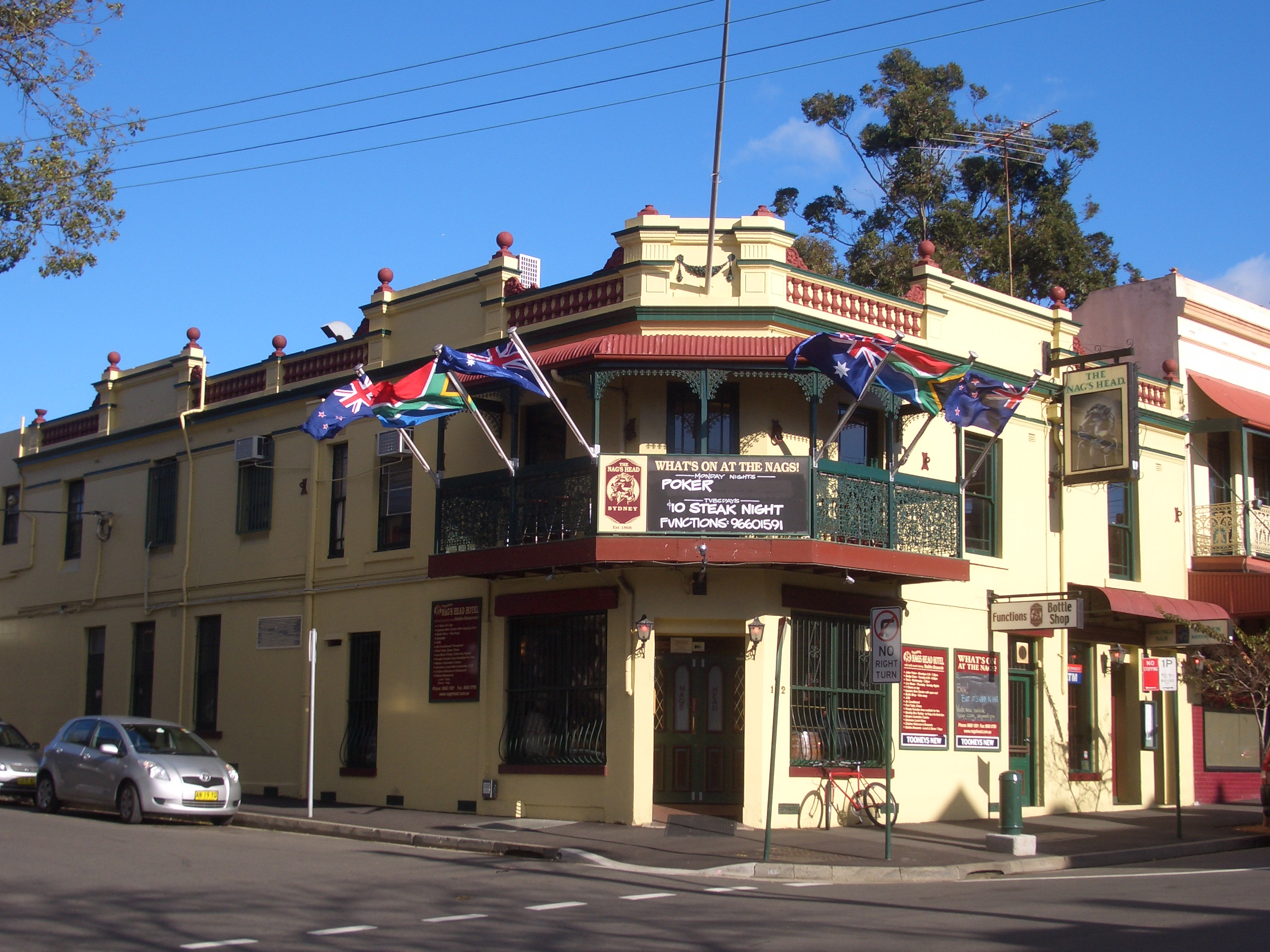
The Nag's Head, St Johns Road

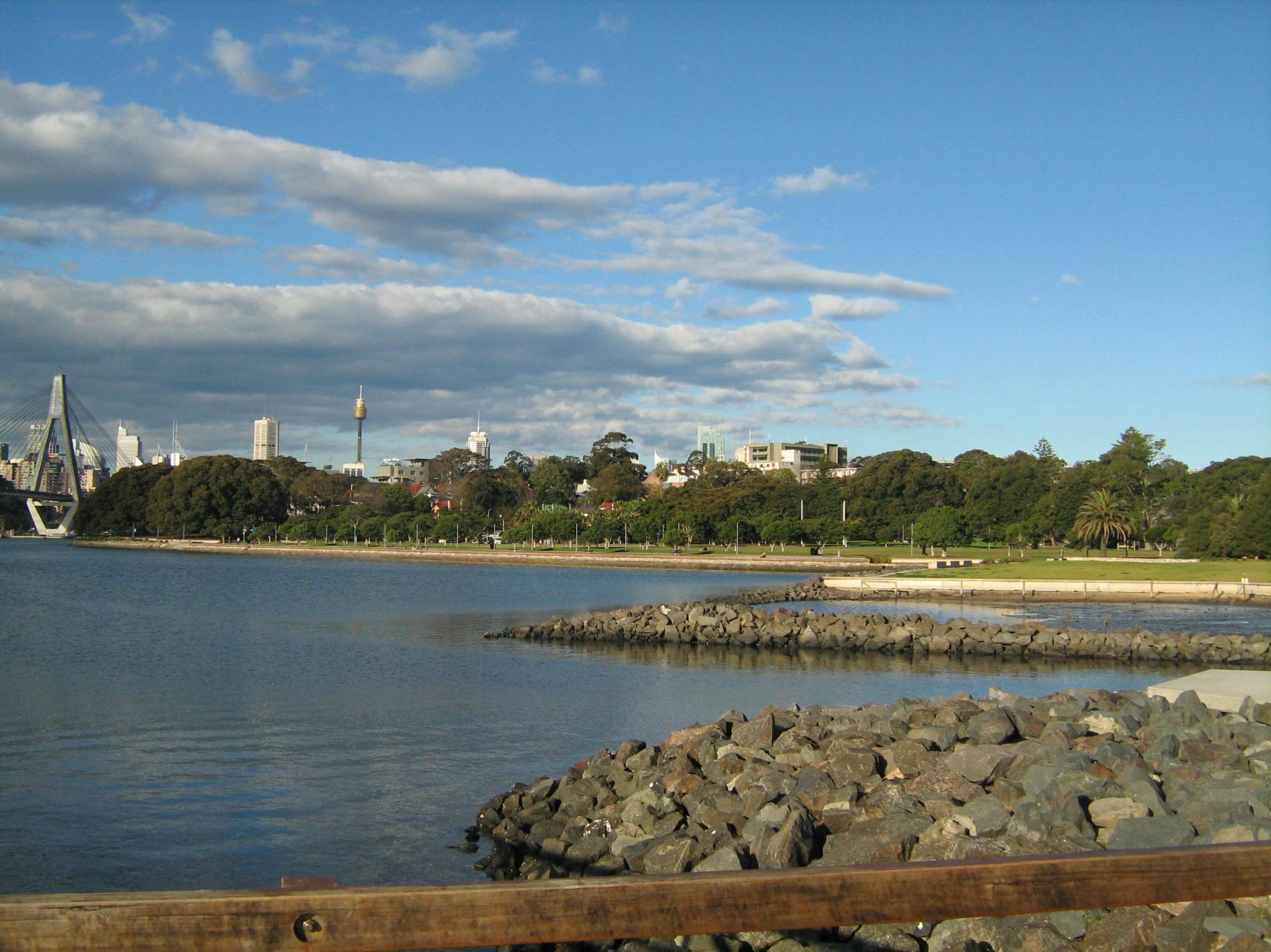
Bicentennial Park on Rozelle Bay

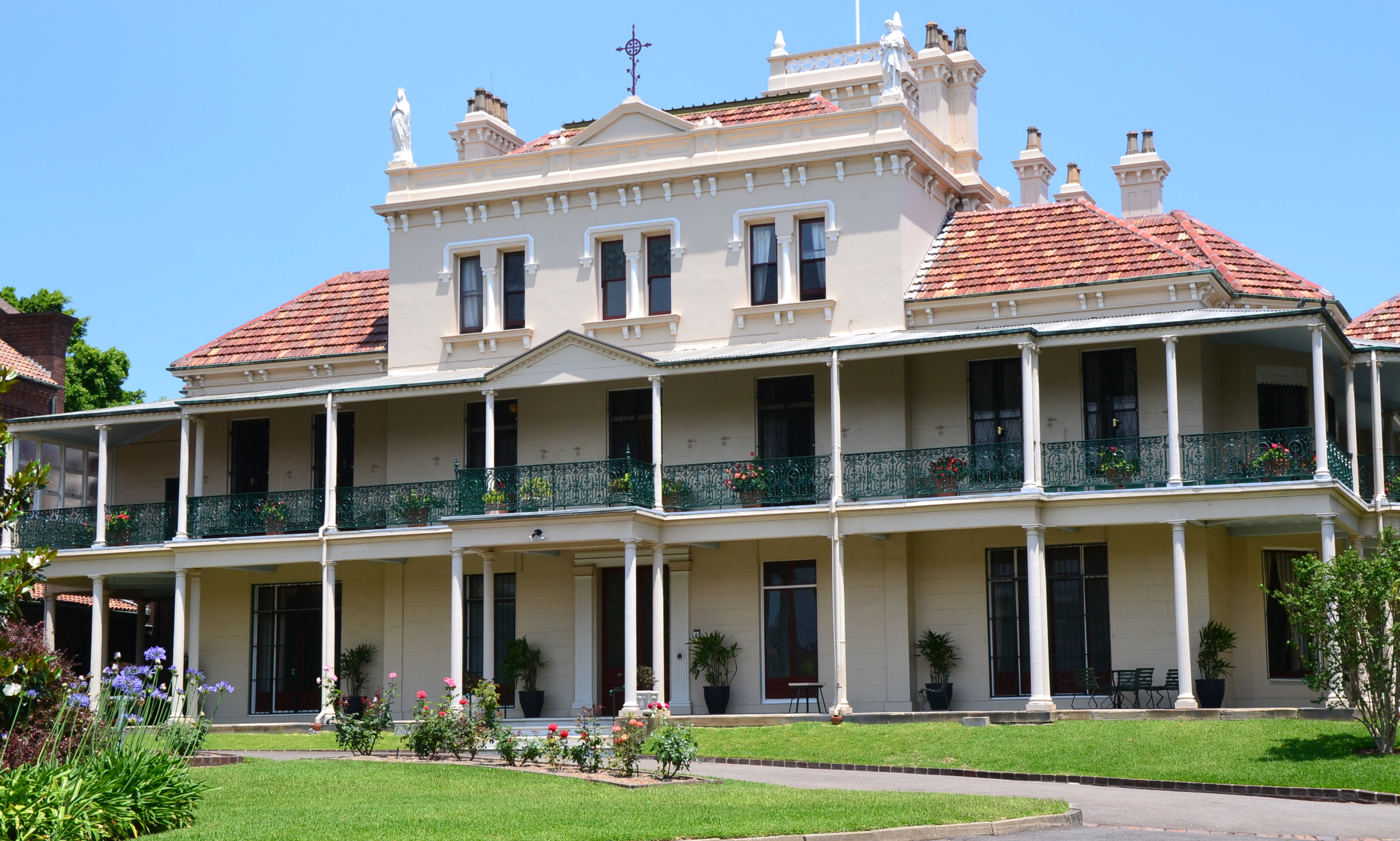
St Scholastica's College, formerly Toxteth Park
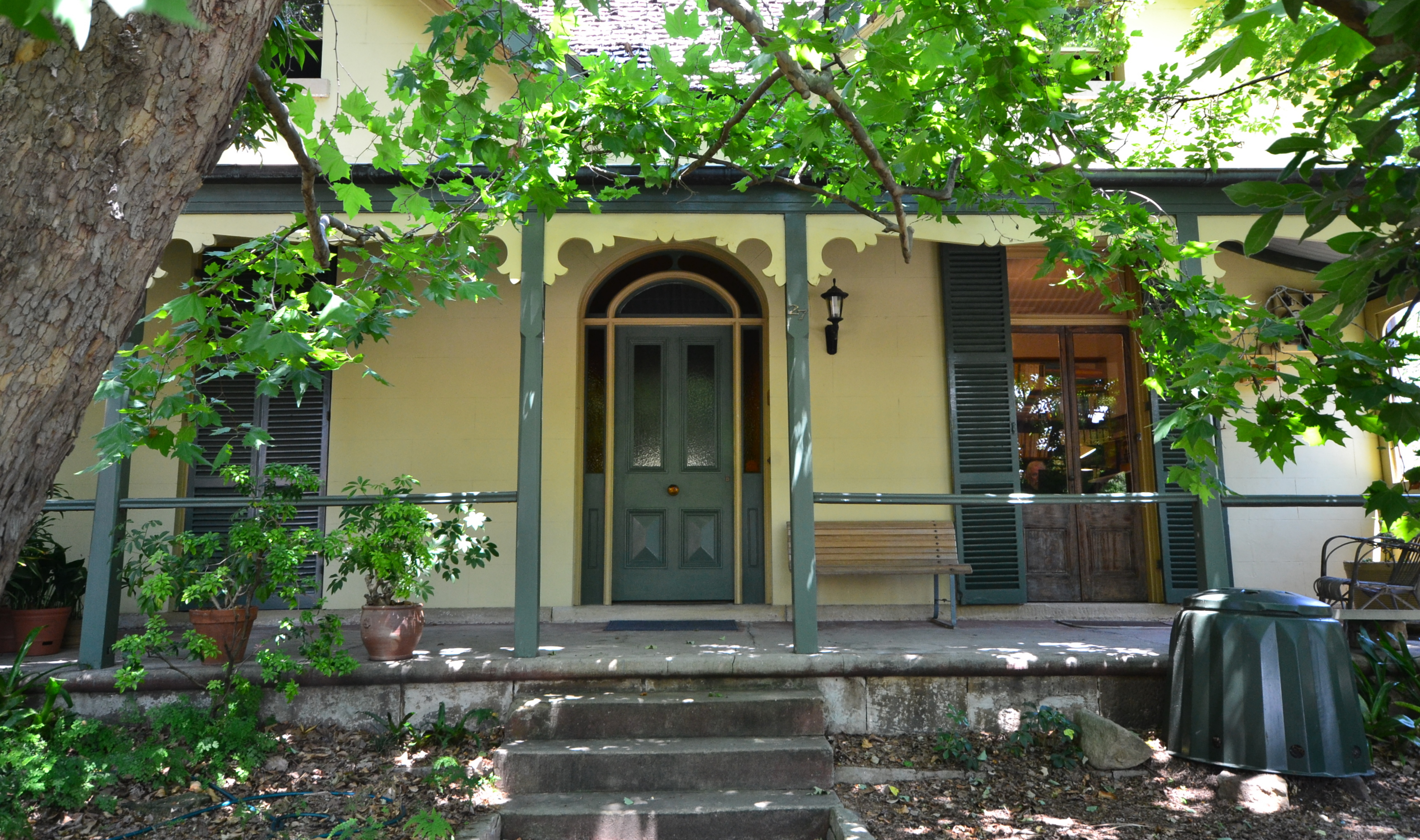
Emslee, Mansfield Street

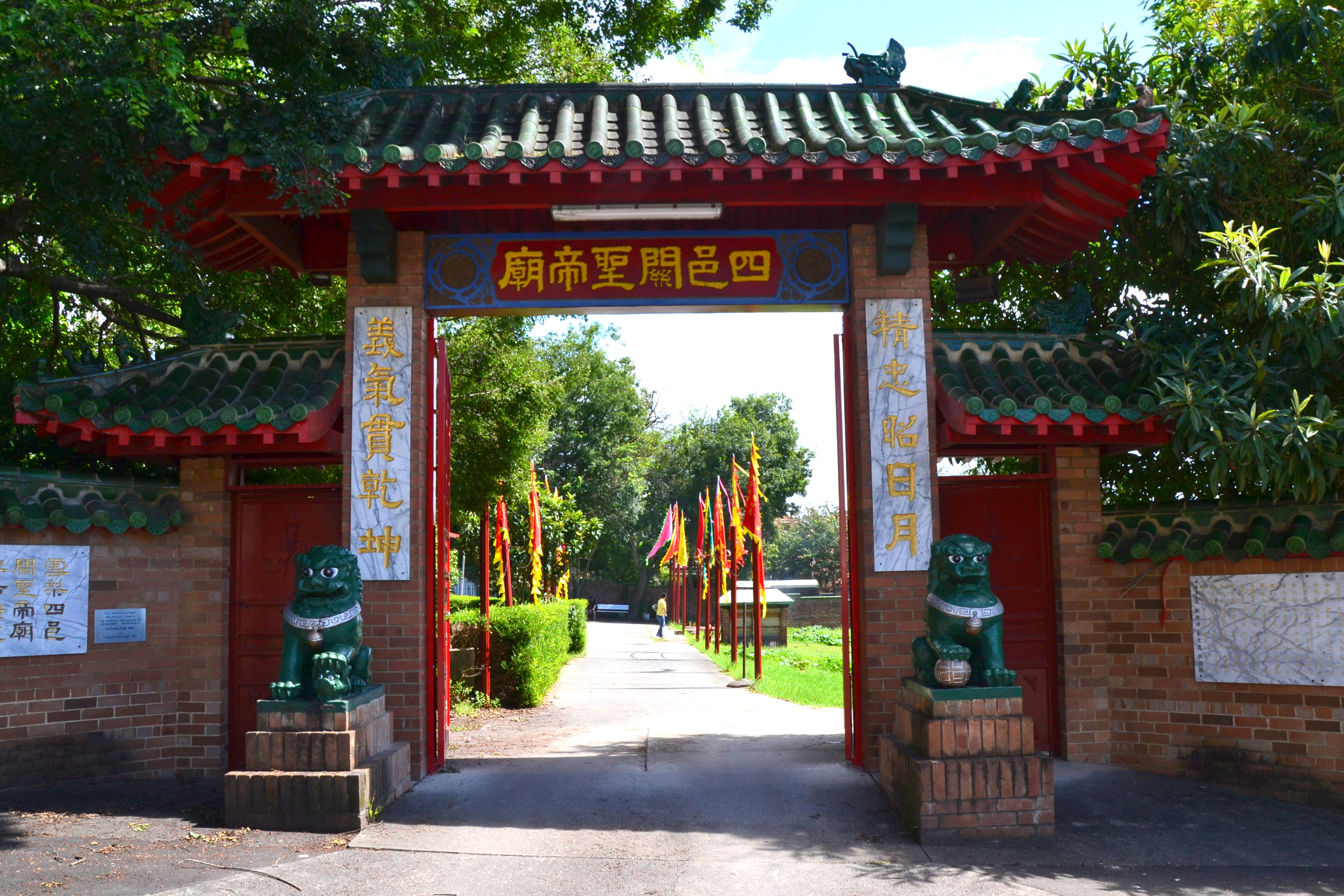
Sze Yup Chinese Temple

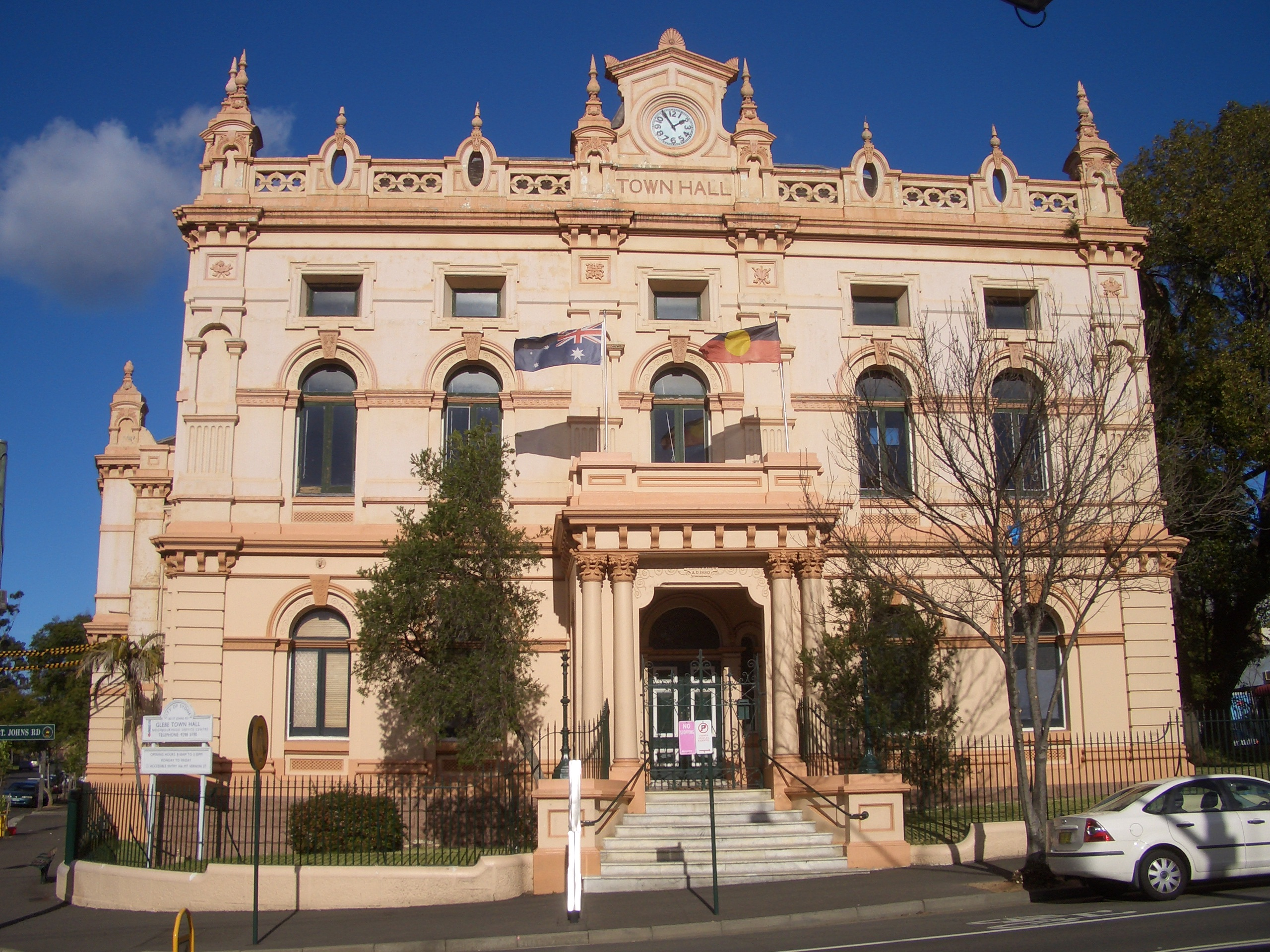
Former Glebe Town Hall, St Johns Road
