= Hereford House =

Australian heritage-listed historic site

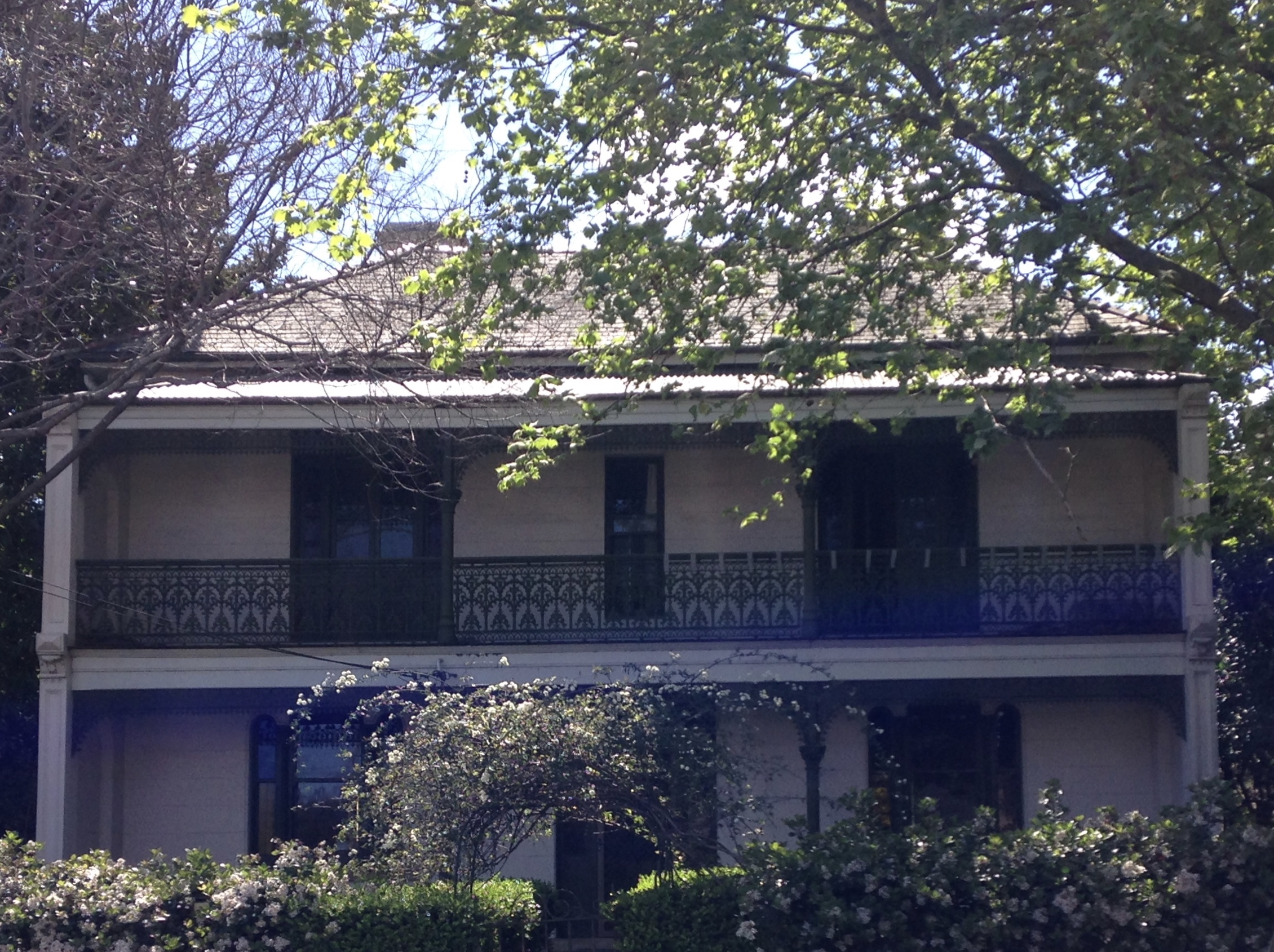
- Hereford House

- Location within Sydney Location within Australia
- 33.8793°S 151.1834°E
- Location: 53 Hereford Street, Glebe, City of Sydney, New South Wales, Australia

History
- Built: 1870–1879

Site notes
- Architectural style: Victorian Filigree
- Owner: Private ownership

New South Wales Heritage Register
- Official name: Hereford House
- Type: State heritage (built)
- Designated: 2 April 1999
- Reference no.: 460
- Type: historic site

Hereford House is a heritage-listed historic site located in Hereford Street in the inner western Sydney suburb of Glebe, New South Wales, Australia. It was built from 1870 to 1879. The property was owned by the NSW College of Nursing until it was sold to a private owner in 2001. The house was added to the New South Wales State Heritage Register on 2 April 1999.

== History ==
Following the arrival of the First Fleet, in 1790 Governor Phillip reserved approximately 162 hectares (400 acres) of land to the south and west of Blackwattle Creek as a Glebe devoted to supporting the Anglican Church. In 1826 the Clergy and School Lands Corporation was formed to administer all the lands reserved for clerical and educational use and income. The corporation made the decision to sell this estate to generate income. The land was sold as two subdivisions at two separate auctions the second being on 7 May 1828.

=== Subdivision of lands ===
In the 1820s Mr A. K. Mackenzie purchased 15 hectares (37 acres) at £15/6/0 per 4,047 square metres (1 acre), being portion 15 of the second subdivision. The study area is contained within it. The full extent of his holding is shown on an updated plan of the Glebe lands. During the following year he subdivided his purchase and submitted it for public action in July 1829. It was reported in The Australian of 22 July 1829.

Frederick Unwin purchased most of this land, including the study area, for a little over £564. In January 1831 an indenture was made between Unwin and John Wood for the sale of the portion of the property for £168. It included the study area. In 1834 Woods' son, John William, paid his father £300 and an annuity for life of £208 for the property.

Because of a complicated arrangement of deposit and repayments of principal and interest between the original purchaser and the Clergy and School Lands Corporation which had been passed on to each new owner Williams did not come into full title of the property until he paid the agent of the corporation (which had been dissolved in 1833) a balance of £175 on his land. He was then granted title to a little over four acres. The title was issued on 31 March 1856.

Woods retained ownership of this property until the 1870s. Council rate valuations of the 1860s record that he had a house, grounds, cottage and orchard very close to the study area closer to Glebe Point Road. It is likely that the study area was part of a garden or the orchard being this close to the main residence. Woods made a will in 1874 and appointed Trustees for his estate. He died in February 1875.

=== Hereford House ===
The trustees subdivided the property and it was actioned as the Glenwood Estate. On 27 November 1875 William Bull paid £320 for lots 4 and 5 of the Glenwood Estate. This encompassed both the present-day 53 and 55 Hereford Street.

William Bull was born in 1819 in Liverpool the son of a First Fleeter. In Glebe Bull is said to have worked as a local wheelwright. By the time he built and occupied Hereford House he was listed in city directories as a Justice of the Peace or solicitor. Bull appears to have used part of his land (the present No 53) almost immediately to build a new, two-storey residence he called Hereford House. He is listed in occupation by the mid-1870s in city directories and council rate assessments which simply describe his property as "house". By 1889 it was home to six people.

The earliest survey plan of the property dates from 1888. It shows Hereford House fenced off from the vacant block of 55 Hereford Street. It is fenced from its other neighbour, a very large residence called "Lask" (now demolished). Between the two, from Hereford Street, was a passage running the full depth of Hereford House. The house is shown to a have a full-width verandah both front and back with a small brick extension at one end of the back verandah. Behind the house, some distance from it on the boundary fence with 55 Hereford Street, was a large brick-built stables. This had a brick WC at one end and galvanised iron shed at the other. No evidence of landscape is recorded on this plan.

William Bull died in the new early years of the new century and the executors of this estate sold Hereford House to Alice Goldmsith and her husband William in 1909. William Goldsmith was a butcher. The improved capital value of their property was rated in 1919 as £1700. The Goldsmiths sold Hereford House to Alexander Levi in 1924. Mr Levi leased the house to Ernest Arnold. A survey plan of the property in 1926 shows that the out-buildings on the boundary with Kerribree had been extended by this date to the back fence. The galvanised iron shed had been more than doubled size and abutting it and extending to the lane was another brick building. The water closets had been transferred to a block that occupied almost all of the back fence leaving a small gate between them and the brick shed on the boundary. Some extensions and changes are also shown to have been made to the back of Hereford House. Levi sold Hereford House in 1928 to Louise and Phillip Leonard. Sands directory listings show that Mr Arnold continued to lease the property at least until the early 1930s. In 1951 the Leonards sold Hereford House to the McCormacks.

It has been claimed the McCormack, a Mayor of Glebe occupied this house since the 1920s and used the premises as a transport depot in his capacity as a growers agent. The stables at the rear of the property are claimed to have accommodated draught horses which were used to transport produce from the railway at Darling Harbour to the city markets. While the property may have been used in this way there is no primary evidence to show an association between it and the McCormacks before the 1950s. Similarly, the claim that there were two tennis courts at the rear of the property on which the champion Lew Hoad learnt to play may well be true but cannot find support in any primary evidence. However, 1943 aerial maps clearly show there were four tennis courts situated at the rear of numbers 45, 47, 49 and 51 Hereford Street.

The property was still in the ownership of Stephen Patrick McCormack and Sons Pty Ltd when it was sold to the NSW College of Nursing in 1981. The 511-square-metre (5,500 sq ft) property was subsequently sold to a private owner in 2001 for A$922,500.

== Description ==
Exterior

The building is single fronted. It has a simple hipped slate roof with terracotta ridge and hip capping, and boxed eaves. There is pair symmetrically arranged chimneys behind the main ridge, which are moulded and rendered. The building has a skillion and gabled corrugated iron roof above a single-storey section at the rear.

The walls are generally ashlar rendered. There is a double storey verandah on the symmetrical street facade. It has a hipped corrugated iron roof. The verandah roof and first floor are supported on cast iron posts. The first-floor verandah has a cast iron balustrade and there is a cast iron valance on both levels.

The windows are generally double-hung, with projecting sandstone sills and single pane sashes. There are two pairs of French windows on the first floor level of the street facade.

Interior

The building has a central hallway on both levels which provides access to a pair of rooms on each side. The hallway has a central archway and a timber stair with turned balusters. The original kitchen would originally have been located in rooms at the rear. There is a large proportion of surviving original fabric in the main part of the house, including plaster ceilings, roses and cornices, marble fireplaces and timber skirtings, picture rails, doors and architraves.

== Heritage listing ==
As at 13 August 2002, Hereford House has historical significance for its association with William Bull, its first owner, a wheelwright and founder of the Glebe Rowing Club. The building also has an association with Stephen Patrick McCormack and his family, the owners of the property from the 1950s until 1981. McCormack was a Mayor of Glebe. The building has historical significance because it demonstrates the process of residential development in Glebe in the mid-19th century.

Hereford House has aesthetic significance as a representative example of a Victorian Filigree style house. The building has significance as part of the Victorian period streetscape of Hereford Street.

The building has social significance because it is recognised by the community as a Victorian period house which is a major element of the Glebe streetscape.

Hereford House was listed on the New South Wales State Heritage Register on 2 April 1999 having satisfied the following criteria.

The place is important in demonstrating the course, or pattern, of cultural or natural history in New South Wales.

The site is one small part of the earliest European association with Glebe and its subsequent history of subdivision and sale into increasingly small allotments is typical of the history of Glebe.

The place has a strong or special association with a person, or group of persons, of importance of cultural or natural history of New South Wales's history.

The Hereford House has particular associations with William Bull and Stephen McCormack, both prominent local figures.

The place is important in demonstrating aesthetic characteristics and/or a high degree of creative or technical achievement in New South Wales.

Good example of their late Victorian-period architectural styles (Victorian Filigree and Italianate Filigree)

The place has a strong or special association with a particular community or cultural group in New South Wales for social, cultural or spiritual reasons.

This site comprise some of the earlier residential developments in this area.

The place has potential to yield information that will contribute to an understanding of the cultural or natural history of New South Wales.

The site is unlikely to contain a substantial and largely undisturbed archaeological resource. Some evidence may be found of the changes made to the landscape, wells or tanks and disturbed fragments of buildings already known to exist. The evidence which may be exposed by future work is likely to add to existing information in quite minor ways. It is unlikely to have potential for substantive interpretive or investigative values.

The place is important in demonstrating the principal characteristics of a class of cultural or natural places/environments in New South Wales.

The residential use, style of house and the economic bracket they represent is characteristic for this part of Glebe during the later nineteenth century.

== See also ==
- Australian residential architectural styles
