= Rothwell Lodge and Factory =

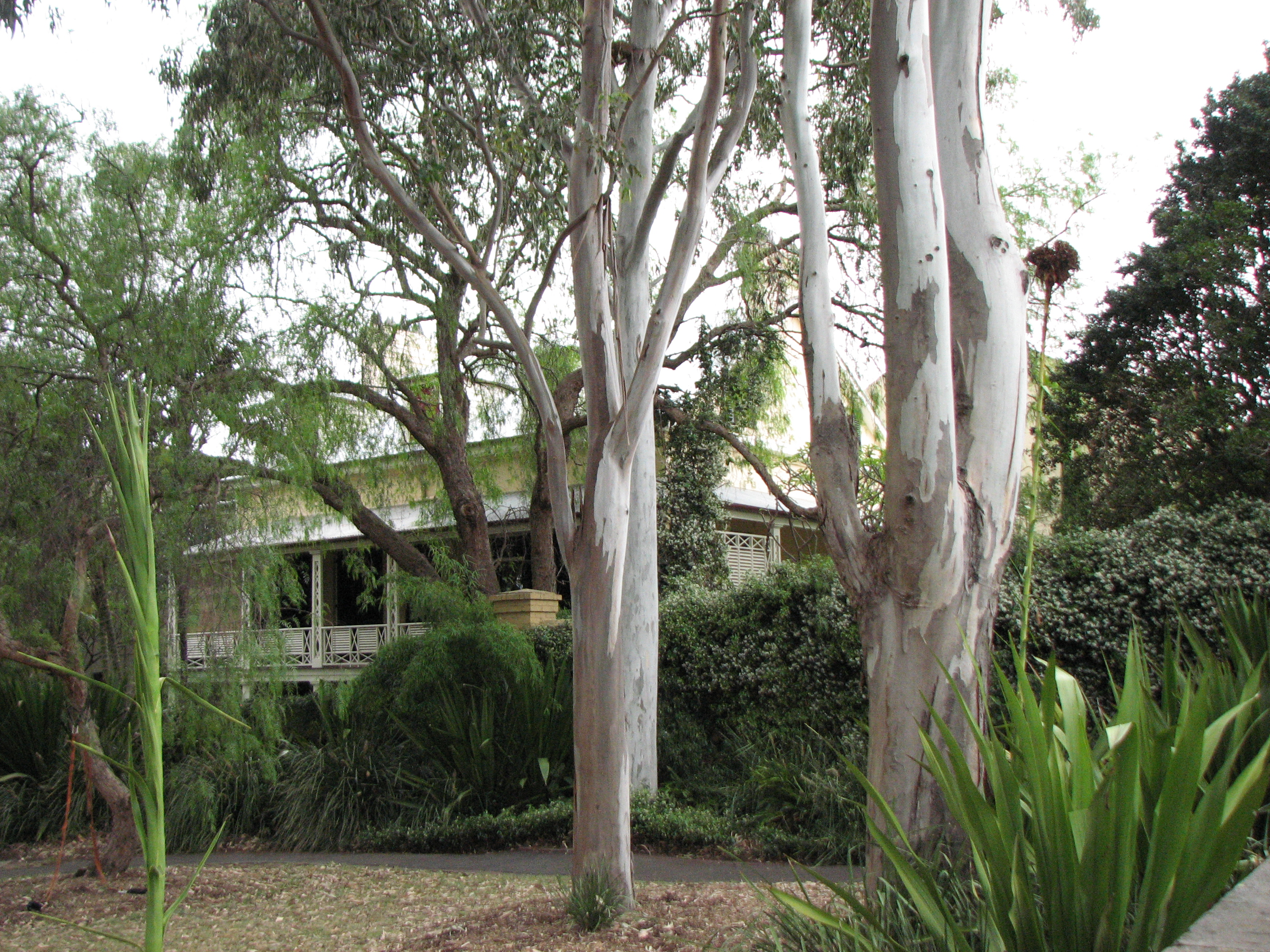
- Rothwell Lodge and Factory, 24 Ferry Road, Glebe, New South Wales

- Location within Sydney Location within Australia
- 33°52′36″S 151°11′10″E
- Location: 24 Ferry Road, Glebe, City of Sydney, New South Wales, Australia

New South Wales Heritage Register
- Official name: Rothwell Lodge & Factory
- Type: State heritage (built)
- Designated: 2 April 1999
- Reference no.: 591
- Type: Historic site

The Rothwell Lodge and Factory is a heritage-listed historic site located at 24 Ferry Road in the inner western Sydney suburb of Glebe in the City of Sydney local government area of New South Wales, Australia. The property is privately owned. It was added to the New South Wales State Heritage Register on 2 April 1999.

== History ==
=== History of Glebe ===
The Leichhardt area was originally inhabited by the Wangal First Nations Peoples. After 1788 diseases such as smallpox and the loss of their hunting grounds caused huge reductions in their numbers and they moved further inland. Since European settlement the foreshores of Blackwattle Bay and Rozelle Bay have developed a unique maritime, industrial and residential character - a character which continues to evolve as areas which were originally residential estates, then industrial areas, are redeveloped for residential units and parklands.

The first formal grant in the Glebe area was a 162-hectare (400-acre) grant to Rev. Richard Johnson, the colony's first chaplain, in 1789. The Glebe (land allocated for the maintenance of a church minister) comprised rolling shale hills covering sandstone, with several sandstone cliff faces. The ridges were drained by several creeks including Blackwattle Creek, Orphan School Creek and Johnston Creek. Extensive swampland surrounded the creeks. On the shale ridges, heavily timbered woodlands contained several varieties of eucalypts while the swamplands and tidal mudflats had mangroves, swamp oaks (Casuarina glauca) and blackwattles (Callicoma serratifolia) after which the bay is named. Blackwattle Swamp was first mentioned by surveyors in the 1790s and Blackwattle Swamp Bay in 1807. By 1840 it was called Blackwattle Bay. Boat parties collected wattles and reeds for the building of huts, and kangaroos and emus were hunted by the early settlers who called the area the Kangaroo Ground. Rozelle Bay is thought to have been named after a schooner which once moored in its waters.

Johnson's land remained largely undeveloped until 1828, when the Church and School Corporation subdivided it into 28 lots, three of which they retained for church use.

The Church sold 27 allotments in 1828 - north on the point and south around Broadway. The Church kept the middle section where the Glebe Estate is now. On the point the sea breezes attracted the wealthy who built villas. The Broadway end attracted slaughterhouses and boiling down works that used the creek draining to Blackwattle Swamp.

Up until the 1970s the Glebe Estate was in the possession of the Church.

On the point the sea breezes attracted the wealthy who built villas. The Broadway end attracted slaughterhouses and boiling down works that used the creek draining to Blackwattle Swamp. Smaller working-class houses were built around these industries. Abbattoirs were built there from the 1860s.

When Glebe was made a municipality in 1859 there were pro and anti-municipal clashes in the streets. From 1850 Glebe was dominated by wealthier interests.

Reclaiming the swamp, Wentworth Park opened in 1882 as a cricket ground and lawn bowls club. Rugby union football was played there in the late 19th century. The dog racing started in 1932. In the early 20th century modest villas were broken up into boarding houses as they were elsewhere in the inner city areas. The wealthier moved into the suburbs which were opening up through the railways. Up until the 1950s Sydney was the location for working class employment - it was a port and industrial city. By the 1960s central Sydney was becoming a corporate city with service-based industries - capital intensive not labour-intensive. A shift in demographics occurred, with younger professionals and technical and administrative people servicing the corporate city wanting to live close by. Housing was coming under threat and the heritage conservation movement was starting. The Fish Markets moved in in the 1970s. An influx of students came to Glebe in the 1960s and 1970s.

=== Rothwell Lodge ===
Rothwell Lodge was built for Rev. William Boyce, the Methodist friend of George Wigram Allen of Toxteth Park, whose second marriage was to Allen's daughter, Mary. Sands Directory lists Boyce at Rothwell Lodge in 1861.

For many years it was a lodging house with a shoe-making warehouse factory at the rear. The house sold in 2014 for $5 million.

== Description ==
Rothwell Lodge is a two-storey post-Regency rendered masonry house with iron roof and dormer window, verandah north and east sides- new addition to south.

=== Modifications and dates ===
Restored as home and office to Otto Cserhalmi in early 1990s. Was restored and dormer windows added. Restoration completed and sold in 2014.

== Heritage listing ==
As at 1 December 2004, one of earliest surviving houses in Glebe, built c. 1840s. Architectural significance as representative of early Victorian Georgian Style. Townscape importance. Developer: George Allen for Rev. Boyce (LEP).

Rothwell Lodge and Factory was listed on the New South Wales State Heritage Register on 2 April 1999.
