= Ernest Ridding =

Australian eccentric

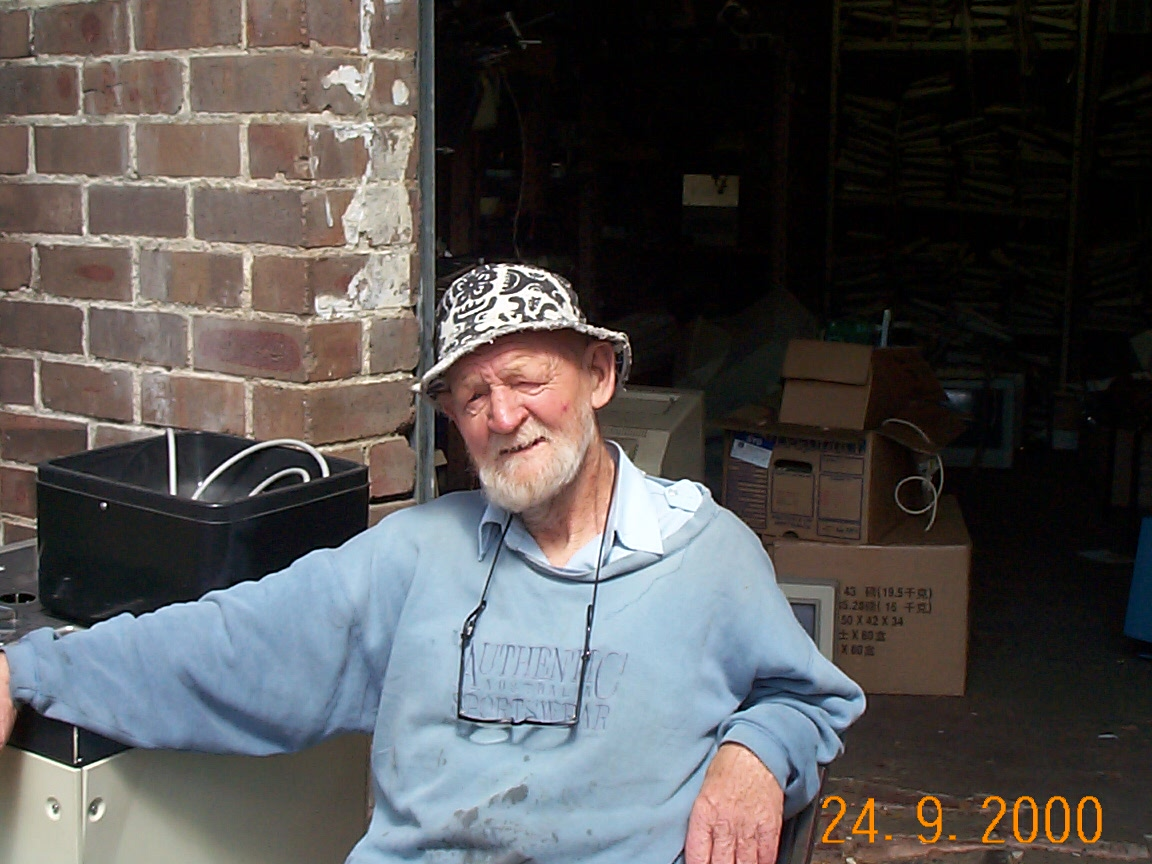
Ernest Ridding in 2000

Ernest 'Ernie' Ridding (1927–2001) was an eccentric resident of Glebe, NSW. He was well known locally as 'The Fridge Man' on account of his practice of repairing old refrigerators and donating them to the poor.

During his early life, Ridding spent time in Goulburn's Kenmore Psychiatric Hospital, after which he adopted the title "Ernest Ridding, GKN LLM" ("Graduate of Kenmore Nuthouse, Legally and Lawfully Mad"). In his final years, Ridding moved to a Marrickville nursing home.

Ridding's life was documented in an exhibition on Sydney's eccentric residents. In September 2007, Ridding's community service was honoured in the unveiling of a plaque, by Governor of New South Wales Marie Bashir, at the Glebe Community Garden, with the text: "In giving, he inspires us to give."

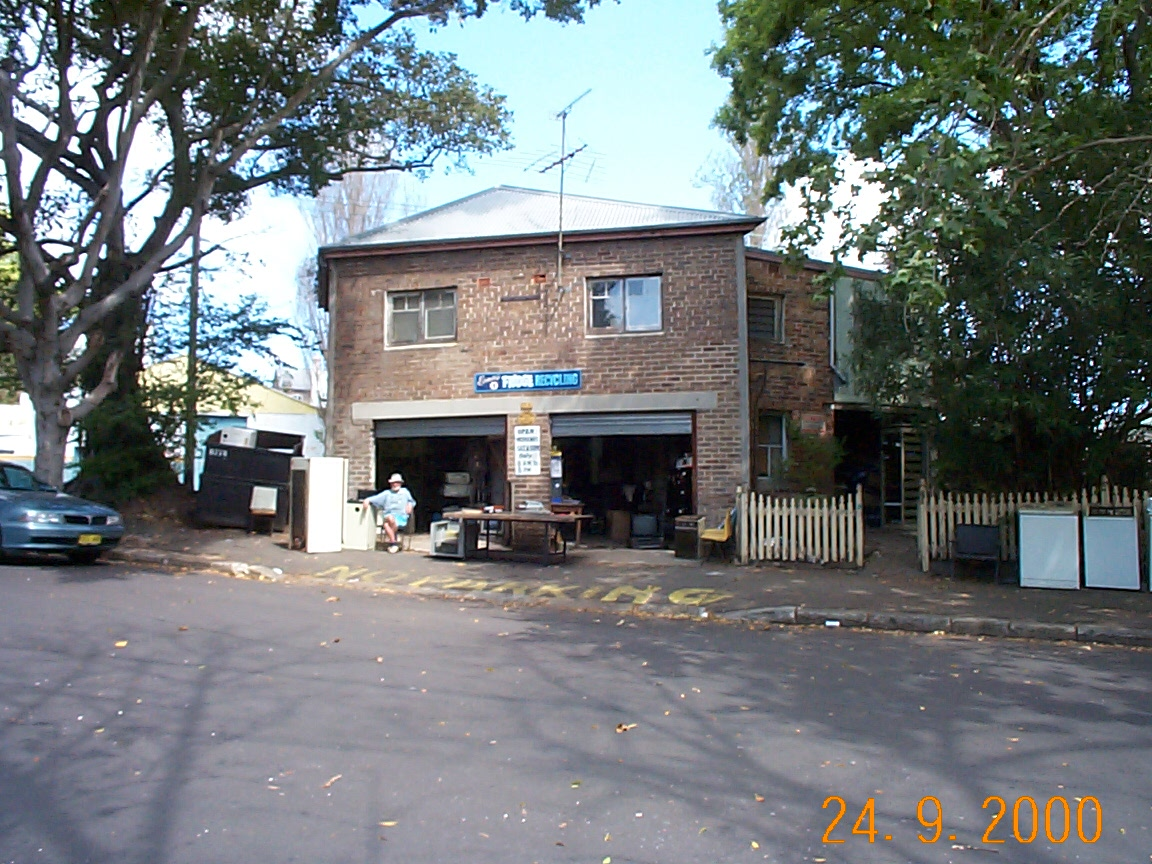
Ernest Ridding outside his establishment
