= Kaberry and Chard =

Australian theatre architects (1920–1939)

Kaberry and Chard was an Australian architectural firm known for designing theatres, picture theatres and town halls from around 1920 until the end of 1939. It was based in Sydney, New South Wales, and designed many theatres in every state of Australia, as well as commercial buildings. The firm's partner's were Lewis Kaberry (1879–1962) and Clifford Chard (born 1884).

== The firm ==
Kaberry and Chard was founded by architects Lewis Kaberry and Clifford M. Chard in 1920. Based in Sydney, Kaberry and Chard grew to be a large general practice, designing buildings of all kinds, but were known especially for their design of theatres. They designed over 57 theatres around Australia.

In July 1936, Chard visited Maryborough, Queensland, to discuss proposed alterations to the Bungalow Theatre there. He also undertook a research visit to the United States, as well as studying art in France and Italy, after which he started using landscape painting as an adjunct to his work.

Also in 1936, Kaberry visited England to study the development of housing conditions and factory construction, gaining valuable knowledge for the firm which was used on his return in commercial architecture.

The partnership was dissolved on 1 January 1940, although both architects continued to practise independently in the same offices at 67 Castlereagh Street in Sydney.

== Lewis Kaberry ==
Lewis Kaberry (Note: Misspelt "Louis" in one source) was born in 1879 in Pontefract, Yorkshire, England. (Note: His birth was registered in the January to March quarter of 1979 in Pontefract district. One source says place of birth is Dewsbury, but so far no corroboration for this. Three older siblings were born in Dewsbury, which may have been the cause of the confusion. He was baptised in Pontefract on 26 January 1879.) His parents were Isaac Kaberry and Mary Ann Knibbs. In 1891 he was living in Bilton, Harrogate. He attended Harrogate College, a boys' school in Harrogate.

Kaberry then worked at architects Tennant and Bagley in Yorkshire before moving to London to work at the office of John Hudson FRIBA. Working as an architectural draughtsman at the Royal Naval College, Greenwich, he served his Articles as an architect under the British Admiralty and worked for the Admiralty in Bermuda. After the 1906 San Francisco earthquake, he lived there and helped to rebuild some of the buildings. He was appointed as chief draughtsman with the Bell Telephone Company in San Francisco in 1908, a position he held until 1913. In an undated letter to the San Francisco Chronicle, Kaberry described how he designed a new telephone exchange in Chinese style, inspired by an illustration of the Empress of China's bedroom for the interior wall treatment.

He married Hetty (or Hettie) Emily Coggins (1884–1975) in London in 1909. Both were Christian Scientists. They had three children, the eldest being anthropologist Phyllis Kaberry (1910–1977), who was born in San Francisco, followed by two boys. One son was called Norman. The family moved first to New Zealand in 1913, then to Newcastle, New South Wales, finally settling in the Sydney suburb of Manly in 1914. where he formed a partnership with Clifford Chard. Phyllis Kaberry attended Fort Street Girls' High School in the suburb of Petersham.

Lewis Kaberry died in 1962.

== Clifford Chard ==
Clifford Markham Chard was born on 13 November 1884 in Armidale, New South Wales, the son of J. S. Chard, who was the district surveyor, having moved from Sydney in 1880. He was a member of the Royal Society of New South Wales, and on the committee of the New England Jockey Club.

Clifford attended The Armidale School. He trained for his articles in the office of Spain and Cosh.

He studied through the Sydney Technical College, passing second year model drawing with an honours grade in 1899. In 1902 he passed freehand drawing with a first-class pass from Armidale; in 1903 he passed first-year drawing with honours from Armidale; and in 1904, the first-year black and white drawing course (then under the NSW Technical Education Branch), also with honours.

He worked for the government's Public Works Department as well as in private practice, before joining the Australian Imperial Forces overseas during World War I.

After the war he joined in private practice with Kaberry to form Kaberry and Chard in 1920. After a research visit to the United States, he also visited France and Italy to study art, and started using landscape painting as an adjunct to his work.

After the partnership with Kaberry was dissolved, Chard continued to work until at least 1941, when he designed extensions to a factory in the Sydney suburb of Alexandria.

== Significance ==
Kaberry and Chard were described in a 1923 article in Everyones (Note: incorporating Australian Variety and Show World.) as "the two foremost theatrical designers and builders in Australia", who were "responsible for the erection of a great number of the most modern picture theatres in this country". The article is based on an interview with the two architects, in which they discuss design principles of the theatre, in which they stress the importance of consulting a specialist.

== Theatres ==
According to Norman Kaberry, Kaberry and Chard designed and supervised the building of over 150 theatres in every state in Australia (not Northern Territory). According to the Office of Environment & Heritage, there were 57 theatre design jobs (new theatres, major and minor alterations) by the firm carried out in New South Wales. Only three remain with an auditorium close to the original design (Roxy Community Theatre, Leeton; Athenium Theatre, Junee; and Montreal Community Theatre, Tumut). Only Leeton and Junee still possess the architects' distinctive "superficial walls" each side of the stage opening.

As of February 2024, the website Cinema Treasures lists 31 theatres either fully designed or with major renovations designed by the firm, with 13 demolished and only six still open. Theatres designed by Kaberry and Chard, with those still open marked **, include:

- Anita's Theatre,** Thirroul, New South Wales (built as King's Theatre in 1925)
- Athenium Theatre, Junee, New South Wales
- Crown Theatre, Wollongong
- Empire Theatre, Sydney
- Enmore Theatre,** Sydney – major renovations (1920)
- Montreal Community Theatre,** Tumut, NSW, which is listed on the National Trust of Australia (NSW) register
- Odeon Theatre, Norwood,** Adelaide (in association with local architect Christopher Arthur Smith, as supervising architect)
- Roxy Community Theatre,** Leeton
- Thebarton Theatre,** Adelaide
- Valhalla Cinema, Sydney
