= Thebarton Theatre =

Coordinates: 34°55′25″S 138°34′8″E

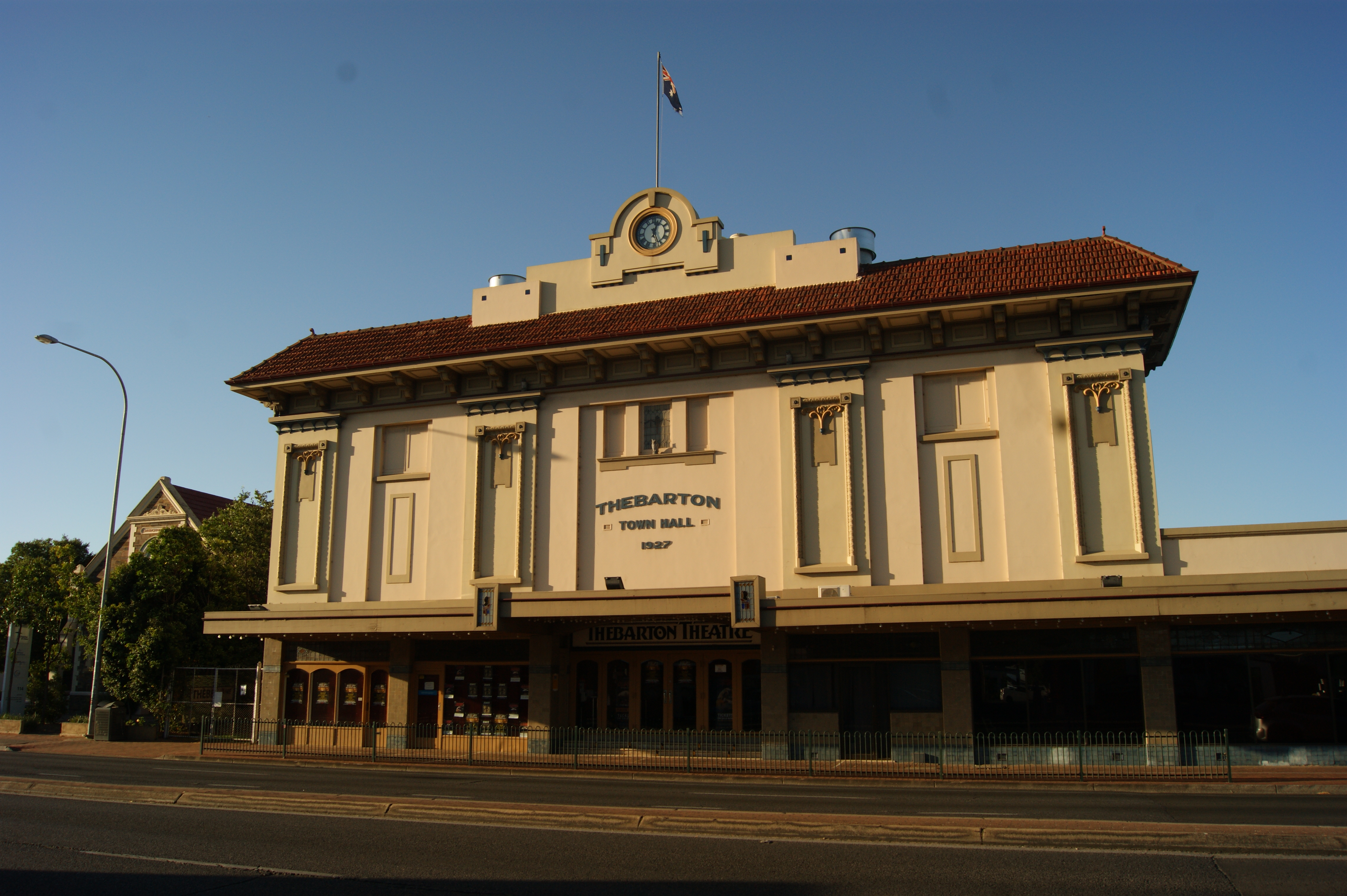
- Thebarton Theatre
- Interactive map of the Thebarton Theatre area

General information
- Location: 112 Henley Beach Road; Torrensville, South Australia
- Current tenants: Weslo Holdings Pty. Ltd
- Opened: 11 June 1928
- Renovated: 1981
- Cost: £30,000 (A$2.31 million in 2016 dollars)
- Renovation cost: over A$1.0 million (A$3.78 million in 2016 dollars)
- Owner: City of West Torrens

Design and construction
- Architecture firm: Karberry & Chard

Other information
- Seating capacity: 2,000

Website
- www.thebartontheatre.com.au

The Thebarton Theatre, also known as the Thebby Theatre or simply Thebby/Thebbie, is an entertainment venue located in the inner-western Adelaide suburb of Torrensville, South Australia. Built in 1926 as a combined town hall / picture theatre and officially known as Thebarton Town Hall and Municipal Offices, the building was opened in June 1928. It was listed on the South Australian Heritage Register on 23 September 1982.

Its capacity is 2,000 people, with customisable seating, enabling to be arranged from "in the round", or with the seating partially or fully removed to make room for a dance floor. It is known as a music venue for both big international names and newly established artists, as well as a range of other types of performance. Thebarton Theatre is in partnership with Holden Street Theatres, and houses its office headquarters.

== History ==
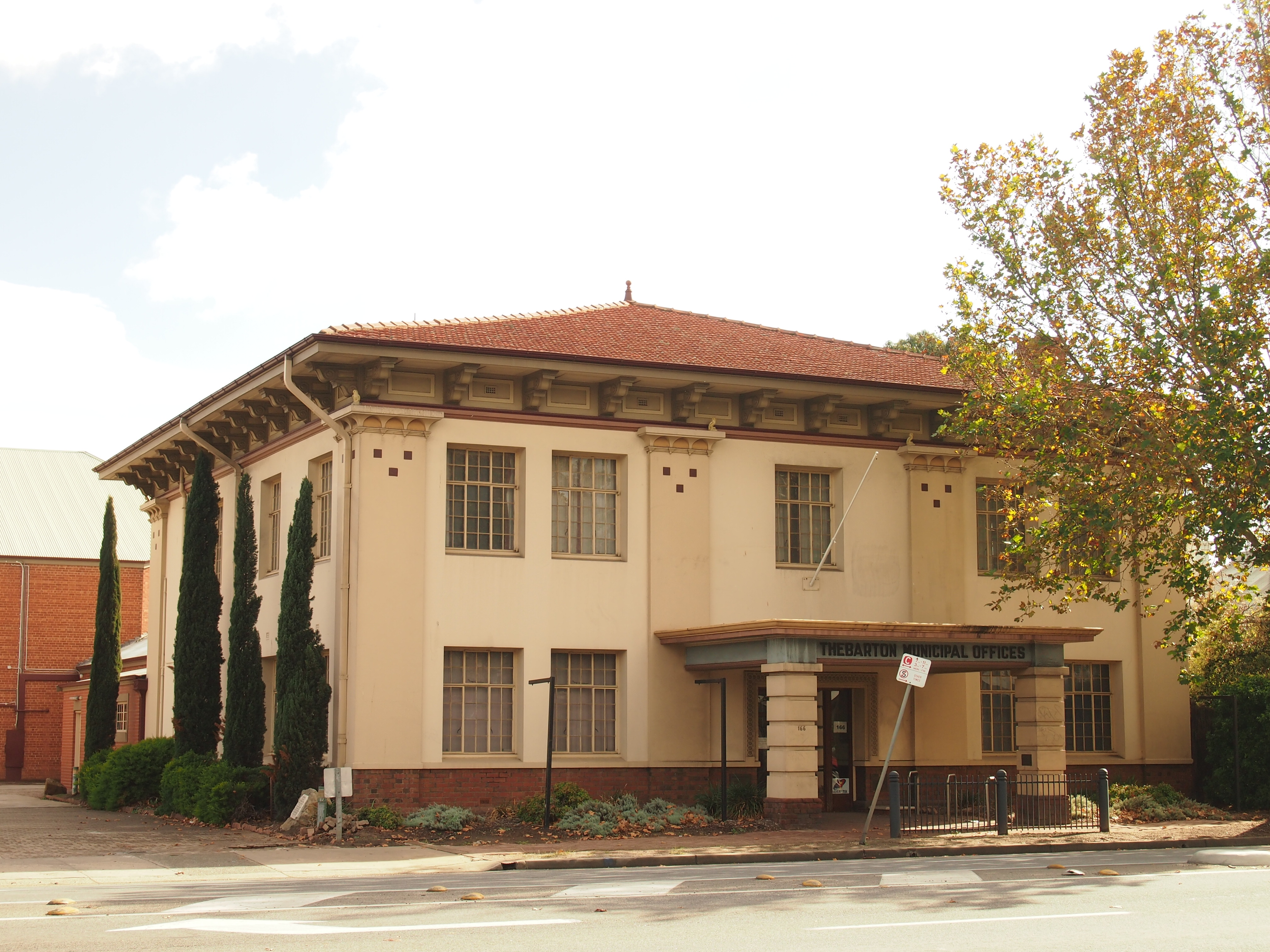
Former Thebarton Municipal Offices, facing South Road

When the "old" Town Hall, designed by Withall & Wells and built in 1885, proved inadequate, the council bought land on the corner of Henley Beach Road and Taylor's Road (now South Road).

Cinema entrepreneur Dan Clifford played a vital part in the design of the building so that it could accommodate use as a picture theatre. He negotiated with several local councils of the western suburbs to create these dual-purpose buildings in the early days of building his cinema chain (first named Star Pictures, then D. Clifford Theatres), and Thebarton was one of the earliest.

The theatre was designed by Sydney architects Kaberry and Chard, who designed a façade for the council chambers similar to Colonel William Light's Theberton House in England. They also designed the Odeon Theatre, Norwood, in association with local architect Chris A. Smith, the Athenium Theatre in Junee, New South Wales, and many other cinemas across the country. Constructed in 1926 for a sum of £30,000, the Thebarton Town Hall and Municipal Offices were officially opened on Monday 11 June 1928 by the mayor, H. S. Hatwell. It was regarded as modern and luxurious, providing seating for 2,000 people, with a large stage and striking proscenium arch. The lighting was innovative and elaborate, with most of the 2,000 lights hidden and used for dimming and colouring effects. There was room for a full orchestra, and seating in stalls, balcony and dress circle levels, and many other rooms used for a variety of purposes.

It continued to operate as a cinema in the Clifford circuit until, after Clifford's death in 1942, the company's holdings, including Thebby, were taken over by Greater Union in 1947. Greater Union continued to operate it as a cinema until 3 July 1965.

From the early days, Thebby has hosted school concerts for a variety of schools across Adelaide.

The building was revived from the 1960s onwards, when it became a venue for the Adelaide Festival of the Arts, including many international acts. From 1966 to 1972, the theatre hosted the state championships for Hoadley's Battle of the Sounds, where many great Australian bands started their careers. It was the venue for several musicals in the 1980s and 1990s, including a production of Hair.

In 1979, Weslo Holdings took over the lease of the town hall, renaming it Thebarton Theatre, and spent more than $1 million on refurbishing the theatre, including the provision of new foyers, toilets, carpets, seating, electrical system, bars, and other retail areas.

The theatre was listed on the South Australian Heritage Register on 23 September 1982. Along with the adjacent municipal offices, it was listed in around 2000 by the Australian Institute of Architects as one of 120 nationally significant 20th-century buildings in South Australia.

Outdoor bars were added in 2018.

In May 2023 a major upgrade to the building was announced. Designed by local architects JPE Design Studio, and built by Kennett Builders, the plans were lodged for public consultation, including the demolition of the old eastern toilet block extensions; addition of a new secondary entry lobby and new toilet amenities to the theatre in the form of a two-storey building 7.35 m (24.1 ft) tall; expansion and upgrade to the eastern carpark and plaza; a new loading dock at the rear of the site, and minor refurbishments and repair works to the existing building, including re-painting. Funding of A$4m had been announced in the 2020/21 state government budget, with an additional A$4m to be provided by West Torrens Council. The project was completed in September 2025, with shows re-commencing from October 1.

== Description ==
Thebarton Theatre is in partnership with Holden Street Theatres, and houses its office headquarters.

The capacity of the theatre is 1,899 fully reserved seating, or 2,000 people with some general admission, but there is a huge amount of flexibility for other configurations, whether a dance floor, kickboxing tournament or intimate performance.

== Selected list of past acts ==
The Thebarton Theatre has hosted a very large collection of acts, including: AFI, Alice Cooper, Alter Bridge, Air, Amity Affliction, Tori Amos, Arctic Monkeys, Avenged Sevenfold, The B-52s, Bad Religion, Barry Manilow, Beastie Boys, Beck, Behind Crimson Eyes, Belle & Sebastian, Ben Folds Five, Ben Harper and the Innocent Criminals, Bill Bailey, Billy Bragg, Billy Joel, Black Label Society, Black Sabbath, Blink-182, Bloc Party, Blondie, Blur, Bowling for Soup, Brian Wilson, Bruno Mars, Bullet For My Valentine, The Cat Empire, Circus Oz, The Church, The Clash, Cold Chisel, Coldplay, Crowded House, Custard, The Dandy Warhols, David Lee Roth, Depeche Mode, Devo, Died Pretty, Disturbed, Down, Dream Theater, Dropkick Murphys, Dylan Moran, DZ Deathrays, Ed Sheeran, Eddie Vedder, Elvis Costello and The Attractions, Europe, Foo Fighters, George Thorogood & The Delaware Destroyers, Green Day, Grifters, Groove Armada, Gipsy Kings, The Hard Ons, Heaven & Hell, The Hives, The Hoodoo Gurus, Hunters & Collectors, Icehouse, The (International) Noise Conspiracy, INXS, Iron Maiden, James Blunt, Jarvis Cocker, Joe Cocker, Jeff Beck, Jeff Buckley, Jethro Tull, John Butler Trio, King Gizzard & the Lizard Wizard, The Kinks, The Living End, Lou Reed, Madness, Mars Volta, Keith Urban, Kylie Minogue, Metallica, Midnight Oil, Miles Davis, The Monkees, Motörhead, Mortal Sin, Muse, New York Dolls, Nirvana, NoFX, Opeth, Orchestral Manoeuvres in the Dark, Paul Weller, Pennywise, Phoenix, The Pixies, Powderfinger, Primus, Public Image Ltd, The Ramones, R.E.M., Redd Kross, Refused, Regurgitator, Richard Thompson, Rise Against, Sepultura, Sex Pistols, The Shins, Simple Minds, Simply Red, Skyhooks, Slash featuring Myles Kennedy and the Conspirators, Slayer, Slipknot, Spiderbait, Split Enz, Stevie Ray Vaughan, The Stone Roses, Stray Cats, The Strokes, Suicidal Tendencies, Sum 41, Tenacious D, The Tea Party, Billy Thorpe, Tool, UB40, The Vandals, Van Morrison, "Weird Al" Yankovic, The White Stripes, Wolfmother, You Am I.

== See also ==
- Adelaide Entertainment Centre
- Adelaide Festival Centre
- Adelaide Oval
- Memorial Drive Park
