= Ben M. Hall =

American writer and historian

Ben M. Hall (1921-1970) was an American author and theater historian. His 1961 book, The Best Remaining Seats, was a seminal work in the history of theaters. It was the first to survey the origins and architecture of America's movie palaces, the palatial cinemas built between the 1910s and the 1940s to showcase the films of Hollywood's major studios.

In 1969, Hall founded the Theatre Historical Society of America.

Born and raised in Atlanta, Georgia, Ben Hall resided in Manhattan, near the Hudson River, at 181 Christopher Street in Greenwich Village. A bachelor, he lived in the upper two floors of a former steamship company. He was murdered there in December, 1970, just short of his 49th birthday.

The following is excerpted from his obituary in the Atlanta Constitution of December 18, 1970:

Benjamin M. Hall III, 48-year-old author ... was born in Atlanta and was active in the Boy Scouts when he attended Druid Hills High School in DeKalb County. He attended Millsaps College in Jackson, Miss., and graduated cum laude from the University of North Carolina School of Journalism. He was a member of Kappa Sigma fraternity.

An infantry captain during World War II, he later worked for Doubleday Publishing Co. He joined Time Magazine in New York, working from 1956 to 1962 as a promotion copy writer and from 1962 to 1965 as a staff writer. He also served as managing editor of Show Magazine.

Hall was the author of the book "The Best Remaining Seats," a history of the golden age of the movie palace, published in 1961. His interest in the subject was reflected in the furnishings of his apartment – murals from a Manhattan Loew's theatre, an electric foyer fountain, a two-manual theatre organ, and a pianola.

Just prior to the slaying, Hall had completed a biography of composer Cole Porter. He was working as a free-lance writer at the time of his death.

Contacted Wednesday night in New Smyrna Beach, Fla., Hall's mother, Mrs. Ben M. Hall, said her son had telephoned her last Friday to tell of plans for an eight-page article on "The Best Remaining Seats" in Life Magazine. [The article ran in Life magazine on February 19, 1971.]

"He had a marvelous sense of humor about him." Said Mrs. Hall, "and he wrote entertainingly as well as accurately."

Hall is survived by his parents, Ben M. Hall, a retired Atlanta architect, and Mrs. Hall, both of New Smyrna Beach; and a sister, Mrs. Rhea T. Eskew of Atlanta.

An Atlanta funeral is planned.

Hall's funeral was planned to be held "Saturday, Dec. 19, 1970 at 2 o'clock at All Saints Episcopal Church in Atlanta." "As pallbearers, Mr. Robert T. Eskew, Mr. Alex M. Hitz Jr., Mr. Joseph Patton [sic], Mr. Charles E. Freeman, Jr., Dr. Marvous Mosteller, and Mr. George C. Woelper."
