= Theatre Historical Society of America =

US non-profit organization

The Theatre Historical Society of America (THS) is a 501(c)(3) non-profit founded in 1969 to promote the legacy of America's historic theatres and insure the documentation of the architectural, cultural and social history of those theatres. Through programs that include the collections in the American Theatre Architecture Archive, regional theatre tours, cooperative museum exhibits, publications, lectures, awards and research fellowships, THS seeks to promote appreciation, scholarly study and use of these historically significant buildings.

== History ==
The Theatre Historical Society (THS) was founded in 1969 by writer and theatre historian Ben M. Hall, author of the first book celebrating America's movie palaces, The Best Remaining Seats. After Hall's death in 1970, one year after founding THS, Brother Andrew Corsini Fowler, Frank Cronican, Terry Helgesen, and others were instrumental in shaping THS into the foremost organization of its kind in the U.S. From just a handful of interested enthusiasts, it has grown into a national organization with an international membership composed of individuals, university and public libraries, theatres, performing arts organizations and other interested firms and groups.

In 2016, the society moved from Elmhurst, Illinois to Pittsburgh, Pennsylvania. In 2018, they purchased the Hollywood Theater in Dormont with the intention of presenting historic films and providing a permanent home for the society. In 2023, the Hollywood Theater closed with no explanation and was eventually sold by to an outside company.

As of 2025, the organization no longer has any paid staff and is strictly a volunteer organization. THS has posted on its website that they are committed to regaining the trust of their members and returning to their mission "to bring the original purpose of THS back to the forefront: preservation of our archive, education and the camaraderie of like-minded people."

== Archives collections ==
Previously located in Elmhurst, Illinois, the collection is now situated in Pittsburgh, Pennsylvania, home of the first nickelodeon, the Warner brothers, David Selznick, and other notables of movie history. The Society's extensive archives contain information on over 16,000 theatres (both domestic and international) and span nearly every style and period of theatre architecture. In addition, they contain historical artifacts and resources documenting the social and cultural heritage of movie theatres and performing arts venues in America. Composed of photographs, negatives, slides, postcards, artists' renderings, scrapbooks, books, periodicals, business records, blueprints and architectural drawings, supplier and trade catalogs, architectural artifacts, theatre furnishings, ushers' uniforms, and numerous other items our collections relating to theatre buildings and their cultural and social history. The archives now reside at the Heinz History Center in Pittsburgh and are currently not open to the public.

Each year, the Thomas R. DuBuque Research Fellowship is awarded to support scholars interested in conducting on-site research in the collections of the ATAA. The Fellowship provides monetary support to winning proposals.

== Conclave Theatre Tour ==
Each year THS engages different communities across the United States with a week-long Theatre Tour called “Conclave.” Held in a different geographic location each year, the tour is designed to showcase 20-30 local theatres and their historical significance within the spectrum of theatre history. Over the past 30 years, THS has designed tours for major metropolitan areas (including Chicago, New York City, Detroit, and Los Angeles) and tours that include the New York Capital Region and Seattle, Washington. These tours are attended by over 100 enthusiasts from over six countries internationally.

== Publications ==
THS produces two publications yearly, Marquee, a quarterly journal which has been published continuously since 1969, and the Annual, published since 1973. Both publications are made up of in-depth articles on topics related to theatre buildings and their social and cultural legacy. Our publications serve as primary vehicles for showcasing materials from our collections.

Each year, the Jeffrey Weiss Literary Award is awarded to encourage interest in research and writing on historic theatres and to provide additional content for Marquee.

== Yearly awards ==
THS presents awards for Outstanding Theatre Book of the Year award, Member of the Year and Honorary Member of the Year. The Creating Theatre History Award and President's Award are presented on a merit basis, typically honoring individuals and organizations for their work to rescue, restore and operate historic theatres or exceptional dedication to THS.

== See also ==
- American Theatre Organ Society
- Cinema Treasures
