= Roxy Community Theatre =

- The Roxy
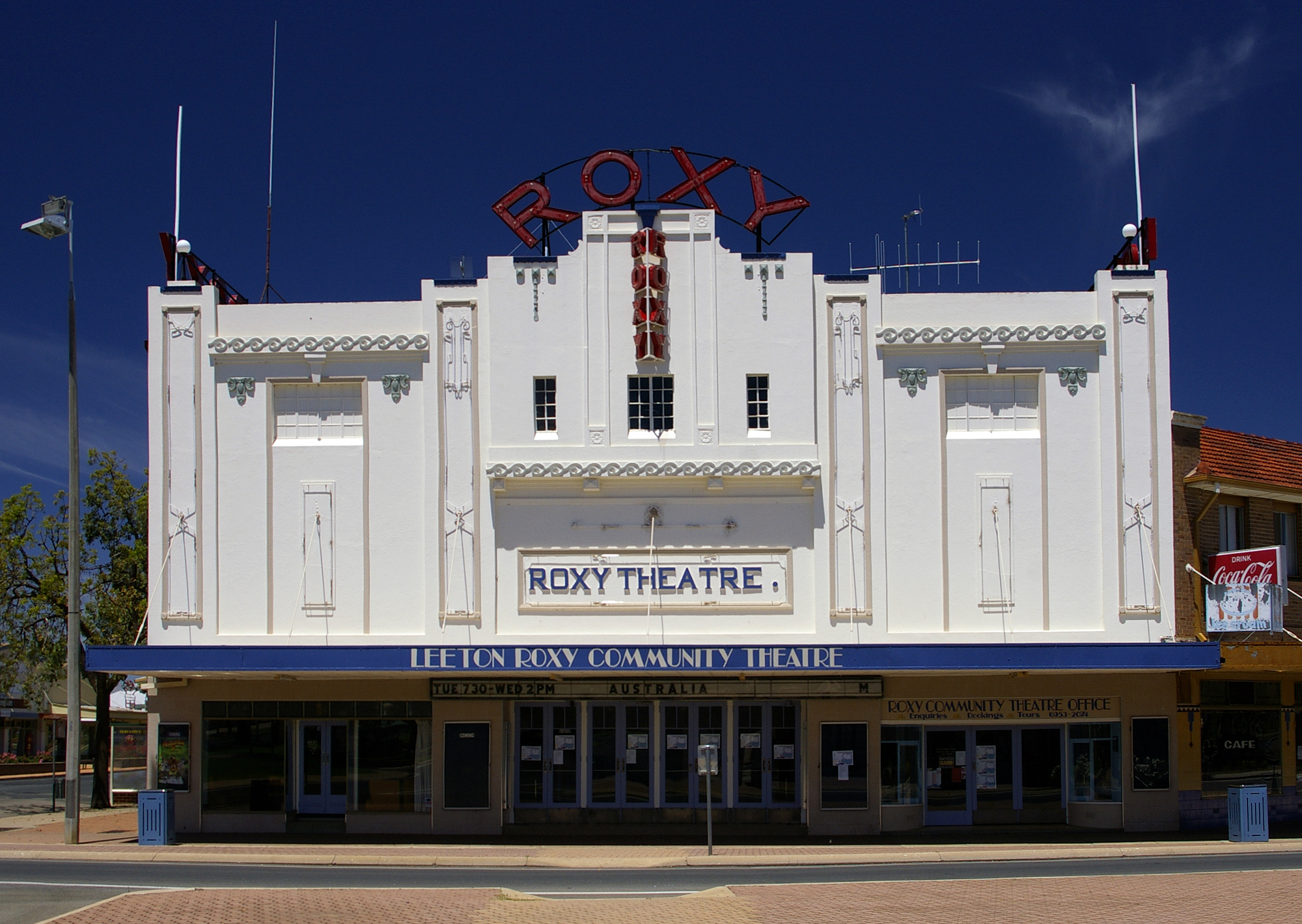
- Roxy Community Theatre
- Interactive map of Roxy Community Theatre
- Former names: Roxy Theatre
- Location: 114-118 Pine Avenue, Leeton, Leeton Shire, New South Wales, Australia
- Coordinates: 34°33′07″S 146°24′19″E
- Capacity: 880
- Type: Civic/Movie theatre

Construction
- Built: 1929–1930
- Opened: 7 April 1930
- Expanded: 1933

Website
- roxyleeton.com.au
- Building details

General information
- Architectural style: Art Deco/Art Nouveau/Spanish Mission

Design and construction
- Architect: Kaberry and Chard

New South Wales Heritage Register
- Official name: Roxy Community Theatre; Roxy Theatre; Big Red
- Type: State heritage (built)
- Designated: 24 February 2006
- Reference no.: 1747
- Type: Cinema
- Category: Recreation and Entertainment
- Builders: W. H. Hones for George Conson

The Roxy Community Theatre is a heritage-listed cinema, live theatre, theatre, concert venue and meeting venue located at 114-118 Pine Avenue, Leeton in the Leeton Shire local government area of New South Wales, Australia. It was designed by Kaberry and Chard architects in the Art Deco/Art Nouveau/Spanish Mission style and built from 1929 to 1930 by W. H. Hones for George Conson. It is also known as Roxy Theatre and Big Red. The property is owned by Leeton Shire Council. It was added to the New South Wales State Heritage Register on 24 February 2006.

== History ==
The Roxy opened 7 April 1930 and was built for Riverina Theatre entrepreneur George Conson. The architects for the theatre were the noted firm of Kaberry and Chard.

The popularity of the Roxy as a theatre name, imported from America's most famous movie theatre, reflects the importance and worldwide influence of movies and the glamorous American lifestyle depicted in Hollywood films, embraced by Australian society during the 1920s and 1930s inter-war period. The original Roxy Theatre, built in New York in 1927, was the world's largest showcase cinema from this era of theatrical movie palaces. It was established by and named after the master cinema showman himself, Samuel "Roxy" Rothapfel. "Roxy" as a name thus became synonymous with showmanship and dramatic cinema palaces from the boom time era of movies, wherever American cinema, Pop culture, and the theatrical American movie lifestyle became influential, admired and replicated.

The theatre was built by Mr W. H. Jones (sometimes J. H. Jones), with a seating capacity of 1091 on two levels. The Roxy was built in a modified Spanish Mission Style, with large red neon signs that were visible from a great distance at night, owing to the theatre's location on top of a hill. As a result, the Roxy was nick-named "Big Red" . These lights were installed in 1933 when a full sized concert stage was constructed to mark its official opening. Australia's celebrated soprano singer, Miss Gladys Moncrieff OBE, was engaged to sing in October 1933, as part of these opening celebrations.

In 1977 the theatre's future was threatened with redevelopment. A meeting was called on 2 June 1977 by the Leeton and District Community Advancement Fund where the theatre's future was discussed including unanimously agreeing that the theatre should be retained as a Civic type building and also should be saved as a picture theatre. On 23 June 1977 the matter on the theatre was discussed further at the Leeton and District Community Advancement Fund's Annual General meeting with extensive investigations made and convinced of the buildings soundness and viability. The theatre was purchased by the community after a massive fund raising drive. $27,000 was raised by the Save The Roxy Committee and it was purchased for $75,000. Ownership was vested in Leeton Shire Council.

The theatre was progressively upgraded to provide a larger stage area and new dressing rooms, with a present seating capacity of 880 people (414 downstairs and 474 in the upstairs lounge area). It is run by a small part-time staff and a voluntary management committee. In addition to showing regular films, the Roxy is now the venue for eisteddfods, discos, high school speech nights and the musical society's annual production. It has been restored to its original 1930s style.

== Description ==
The Roxy is a fine example of an Inter-war cinema designed in a modified Art Deco architectural style with Art Nouveau and Spanish Mission elements. The building is constructed of brick walls, with the primary facade rendered, the roof clad in corrugated iron and timber floors. The theatre has a full size concert stage with the original two levels of seating, a foyer and ticket box area and an integrated shop at the west side. Large red neon lettering for "Roxy" is mounted above the roof parapet in three directions, plus extensive neon lighting on the front facade.

=== Condition ===
As at 18 May 2005, the theatre is in good condition, although some maintenance required. Heritage Council funding for conservation works to the Roxy Theatre were approved in 1992 for a total of $15,600. In December 2018 the NSW Government announced an additional $3.9 million grant towards a $4.4 million refurbishment of the Roxy Theatre.

The Roxy and associated shop survives virtually intact.

=== Modifications and dates ===
- 1933 – Larger concert stage and dressing rooms constructed.
- 1933 – Facade neon lighting and red neon "Roxy" sign installed, and restored in 1992.
- 1995-1998 – Electrical upgrade to replace original decayed wiring.
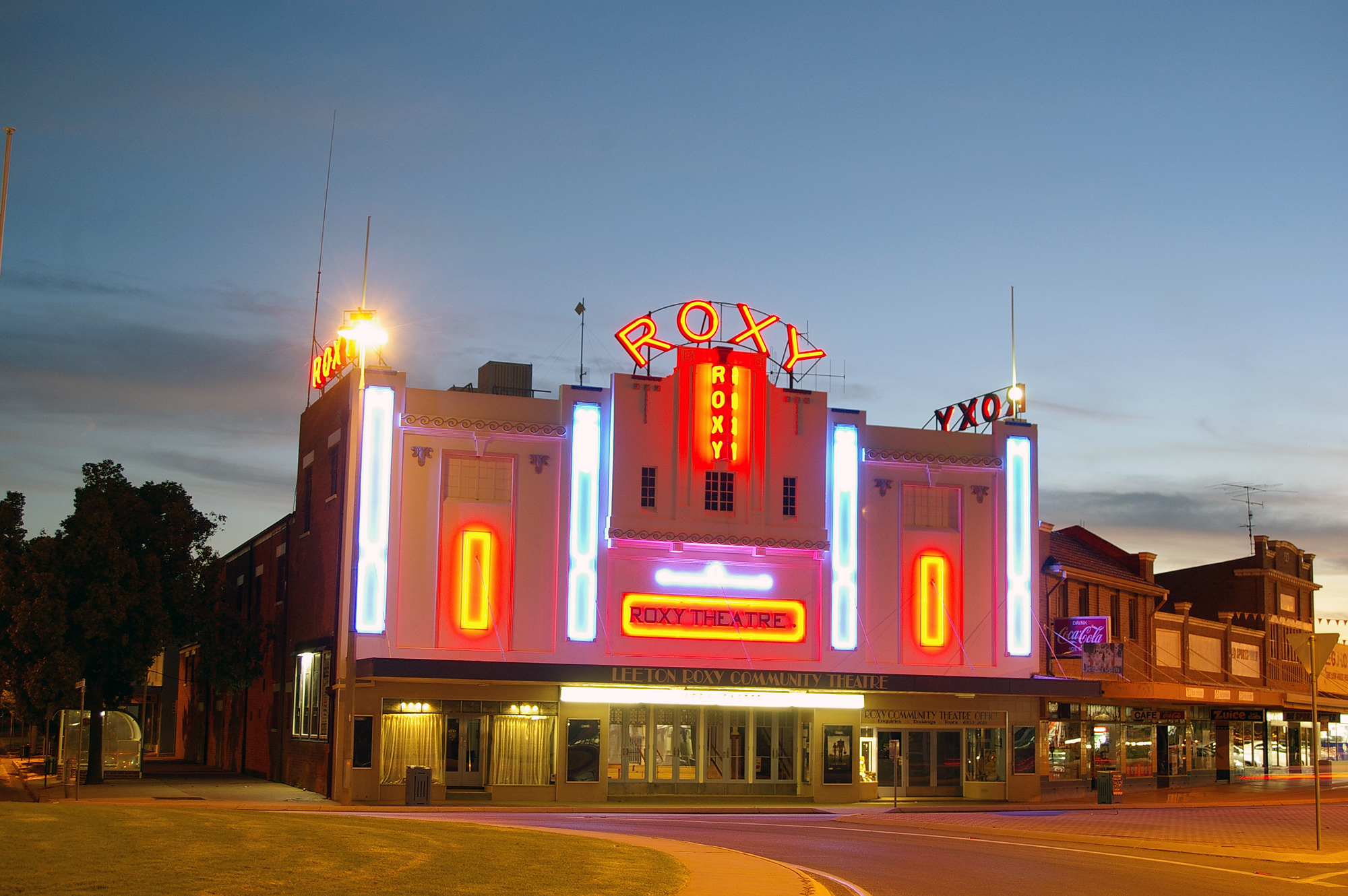
The Roxy Community Theatre at dusk

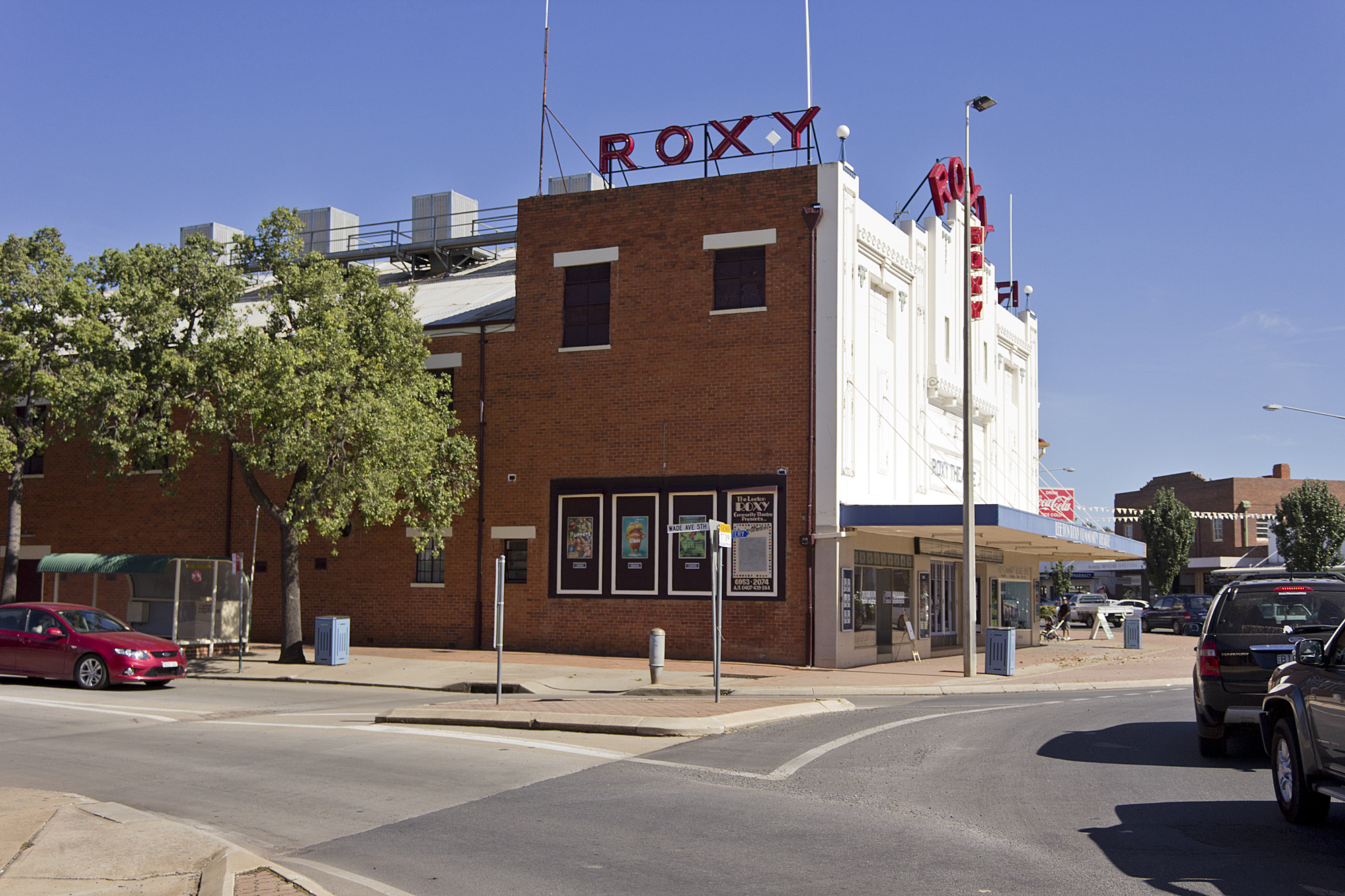
Leeton Roxy Community Theatre viewed from the corner of Kurrajong Ave and Wade Ave South

== Heritage listing ==
As at 20 November 2006, The Roxy Community Theatre is a rare surviving example of an Inter-war cinema in country NSW from the heyday era of movies, which demonstrates the importance of "cinema going" during the first half of the 20th century in NSW towns before the advent of television, embraced by Australian society during the 1920s and 1930s.

Dating from 1929, the Roxy Theatre also demonstrates and records the early introduction of American Pop culture into country NSW by the early Hollywood movies shown for the first time in this cinema, by the building function, original theatrical design and its name, which were all modelled on the world's largest showcase movie palace of the time, the original Roxy Theatre in New York of 1927. This early introduction of American Pop culture in the form of Hollywood movies and picture theatres, as represented by the Leeton Roxy Theatre, provided a major new form of entertainment, communication and society to NSW communities, as well as having a significant influence on Australian tastes of the time in architecture, fashion and design generally, language, music and behaviour.

Built in 1929–1933, the Roxy Theatre is a fine example of an Art Deco cinema with Spanish Mission and Art Nouveau elements, which has survived remarkably intact. Of the hundreds of cinemas that once existed in country towns throughout NSW from the height of its popularity and influence, the Roxy now represents one of only eleven surviving country cinemas in the State that retain their original integrity. Designed by the major theatre architects of the time, Kaberry and Chard, the Roxy also illustrates one of only three surviving examples of their collection of work in NSW cinemas. The Roxy Theatre is also especially rare in NSW for retaining its original theatre interiors and spaces on two levels.

Roxy Community Theatre was listed on the New South Wales State Heritage Register on 24 February 2006 having satisfied the following criteria.

The place is important in demonstrating the course, or pattern, of cultural or natural history in New South Wales.

The Roxy Theatre represents a rare surviving example of a country cinema from the heyday era of movies, which demonstrates the importance of "cinema going" during the first half of the 20th century in NSW towns before the advent of television. The scale of the theatre constructed to seat over 1000 patrons on two levels, the central location and landmark building design all illustrate the popularity and social importance of the cinema during this era when going to the cinema was second only to sport as the most popular leisure activity.

In its style, era, function and name, the Roxy also demonstrates the early introduction of American Pop culture into country NSW, which in addition to providing a major new form of entertainment, communication and society, had a significant influence of popular Australian tastes of the Inter-war period, ranging from architecture, fashions and design generally to food, drink, language, music and behaviour. As became popular for cinemas of this boom time era of movies, the theatre name and dramatic Art Deco/Spanish Mission style of the building were all modelled on America's "Roxy Theatre" in Broadway, New York. This was America's most famous theatre and the world's largest showcase movie palace of the time. It was built in 1927, now demolished. The original Roxy was established by and named after the master cinema showman himself, Samuel "Roxy" Rothapfel. "Roxy" as a name thus became synonymous with showmanship and dramatic cinema palaces from the boom time era of movies wherever American cinema and the theatrical American movie lifestyle became influential, admired and replicated in local Pop culture, leisure activities, fashions and architectural styles.

The construction of the cinema during the Inter-war period demonstrates a period of growth for Leeton following the incorporation of the town as a shire. The building has formed part of the town fabric for 66 of the 84 years of the town's existence, with the cinema continuing to serve the community for 75 years.

The place has a strong or special association with a person, or group of persons, of importance of cultural or natural history of New South Wales's history.

The building is associated with Gladys Moncrieff OBE, who was the most famous soprano in Australia since the retirement of Florence Austral for the period of the 1930s to the end of the 1940s. The building symbolises those lost country theatres in NSW in which Moncrieff appeared, in this case for a six-day concert in 1933 to celebrate the addition of the stage.

The theatre is also associated with the major theatre architects, Kaberry and Chard, which illustrates one of their original designs largely intact. From a large body of work in NSW cinemas from this period, the Roxy is one of only three of their works which has survived with original integrity.

Further research may also demonstrate associations with further personalities of significance in the history of entertainment, movie making or theatres in NSW.

The place is important in demonstrating aesthetic characteristics and/or a high degree of creative or technical achievement in New South Wales.

The Roxy Theatre represents a rare surviving example of the work of the major theatre architects, Kaberry and Chard. It is a fine example of a country picture theatre from the Inter-War period, designed in a modified Art Deco architectural style with Art Nouvou and Spanish Mission elements, which has survived remarkably intact, internally and externally. It demonstrates an intact example of a two level theatre interior, retaining its original design, which provides a rare opportunity to experience a country picture theatre of this era.

The scale of the Theatre, its dramatic facade and the prominent red neon signs are a major part of the Leeton landscape. Together with the nearby Walter Burley-Griffin designed water towers, the Roxy is a landmark building of the district. Its location at the crest of a hill makes the theatre visible for many kilometres into the countryside at night, particularly with its red neons aglow.

The place has a strong or special association with a particular community or cultural group in New South Wales for social, cultural or spiritual reasons.

The Roxy is valued by several generations of the Leeton and surrounding community as a key centre for social interaction, community events and entertainment for over 75 years. The theatre has been an essential part of the social and cultural fabric of the Leeton community for most of the town's period of existence.

The Roxy was the first country cinema in NSW to be purchased by the community to save it from demolition in the 1970s, illustrating an advanced social value for these buildings and community activism for heritage, without which most cinemas from this era, including the original New York Roxy of 1927, have been lost. The money was raised in 1977 for the $75,000 purchase of the Cinema from a major fundraising drive and significant donations from the community of $27,000. The local nickname for the theatre. "Big Red", also indicates the emotional attachment the community holds for the building.

The place has potential to yield information that will contribute to an understanding of the cultural or natural history of New South Wales.

As the Roxy is virtually intact from its construction in 1930 and 1933 additions, it offers potential for further research into the design, operation and cultural aspects of early theatres from the time when "talky" pictures were first introduced. This resource includes the associated memorabilia in the form of pictorial records of works and artists and a small collection of early cinema items.

The place possesses uncommon, rare or endangered aspects of the cultural or natural history of New South Wales.

The Roxy is rare in the State as one of only three surviving intact country cinemas designed by the major theatre architects of Kaberry and Chard, of an original collection of 57 theatres commissioned from these architects throughout NSW. The Jadda Centre at Junee and the Montreal Theatre at Tumut are the other two surviving examples. The Jadda Centre was listed on the State Heritage Register in 2004. Only the Leeton Roxy and the Junee Jadda Centre retain the splayed false decorative walls each site of the stage opening, which is a distinctive and theatrical feature of the architects, Kaberry and Chard. Only Tumut has an original proscenium.

The Roxy is also one of only eleven surviving intact country cinemas in NSW, where there had once been 351 cinemas in 289 country towns throughout NSW (in 1951). By 2003 less than 10 per cent "exist" as spaces recognisable as original theatres (that is, only 31). Only 11 of those exist with some form of obviously decorative interior and theatrical exterior. The Junee theatre is one of those eleven or one of only 3.1 per cent of the body of country cinemas that existed in 1951, comprising picture theatres built in the heyday of the silent and sound movies.

The Roxy is a rare surviving example in NSW of an Inter-War cinema that retains the two levels.

The place is important in demonstrating the principal characteristics of a class of cultural or natural places/environments in New South Wales.

The Roxy Theatre represents a rare surviving example of a 1930s country cinema from the heyday era of movies, which demonstrates the importance of "cinema going" during the first half of the 20th century in NSW towns before the advent of television.

It also represents the early introduction of American Pop culture into country NSW, which had a major impact on Australian leisure activities, society, communication and fashions in architecture, clothing, music, behaviour and language.

The Roxy Theatre represents a fine example of an Inter-war cinema of the Art Deco/ Spanish Mission style, which is remarkable for retaining its original interiors and two levels. It also represents a rare surviving work of the major theatre architects, Kaberry and Chard.

== See also ==
- List of theatres in Australia
