= Montreal Community Theatre =

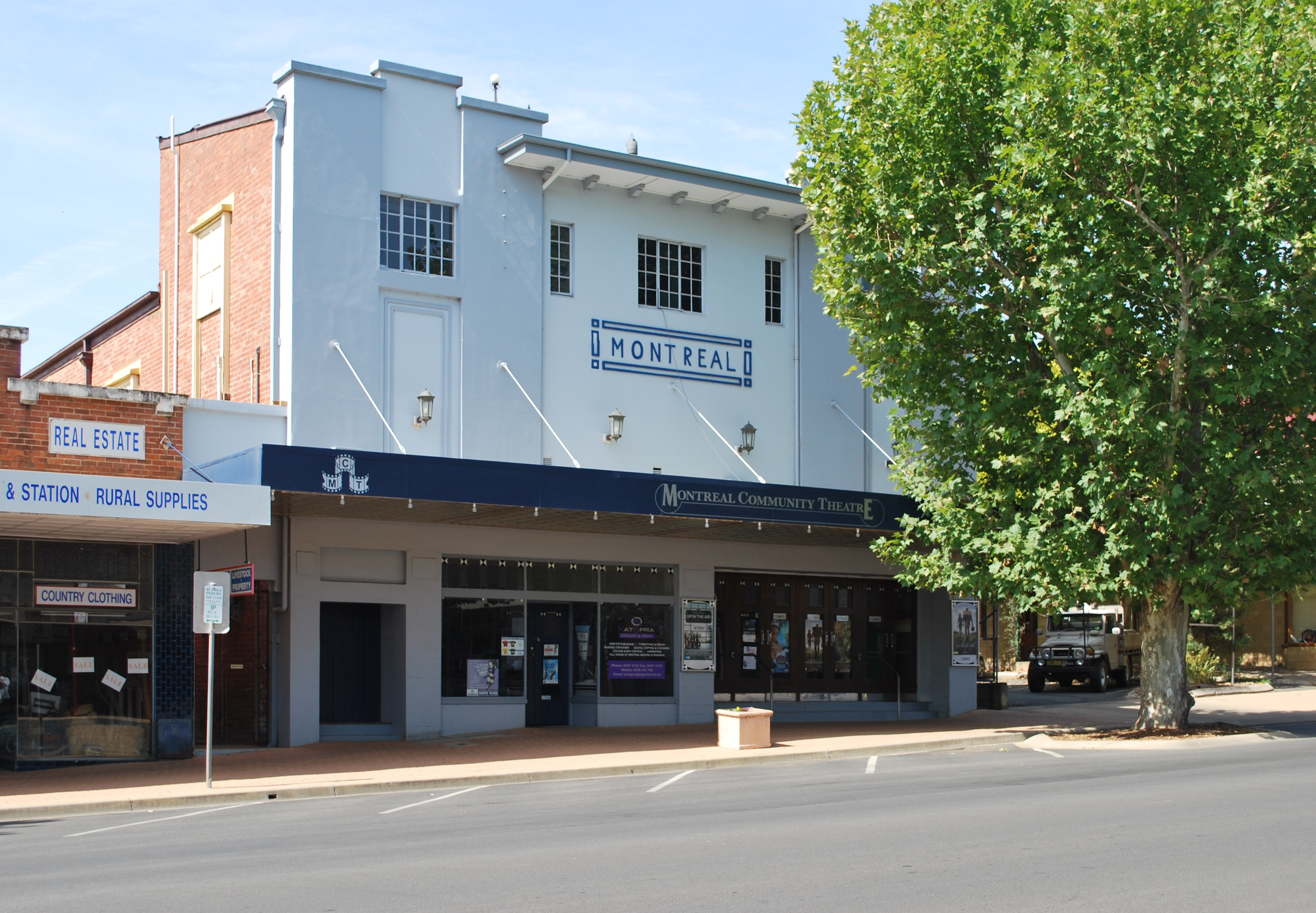
- Montreal Community Theatre, pictured in 2010

- Location within New South Wales Location within Australia
- 35°18′03″S 148°13′21″E
- Location: 46 Russell Street, Tumut, Snowy Valleys Council, New South Wales, Australia

History
- Built: 1929–1930

Site notes
- Architect: Kaberry & Chard
- Architectural style: Inter-war Stripped Classical
- Owner: Snowy Valleys Council

New South Wales Heritage Register
- Official name: Montreal Community Theatre and Moveable Heritage Collection
- Type: State heritage (built)
- Designated: 21 June 2013
- Reference no.: 1909
- Type: Theatre
- Category: Recreation and Entertainment

The Montreal Community Theatre is a heritage-listed cinema and community theatre at 46 Russell Street, Tumut, Snowy Valleys Council, New South Wales, Australia. It was designed by Kaberry & Chard and built from 1929 to 1930. It is also known as Montreal Community Theatre and Moveable Heritage Collection. The property is owned by the Snowy Valleys Council. It was added to the New South Wales State Heritage Register on 21 June 2013.

== History ==
=== Pre-contact history ===
Prior to European settlement, the Tumut Valley area was home to the Wiradjuri Aboriginal people and a regular meeting place of several other groups including the Bigewal, Ngarigo, Wolgol of the southern, tableland and highland Monaro area and Ngunawal from around the Canberra area. During the warmer months of the year these groups travelled through what became Tumut on their way to the Snowy Mountains where they performed ceremonies and feasted on the bogong moth. The word Tumut is derived from a possibly Wiradjuri word for the area, possibly doo-maaht or doormat, meaning "a quiet resting place by the river".

=== Post-contact history of the area ===
The explorers Hume and Hovell were the first Europeans to visit the area when they crossed the Tumut River and entered the Tumut Valley in 1824. The area was first settled in the 1820s.

During the early years of settlement and contact around the Tumut area it seems that the Aboriginal people continued to a large extent to visit the mountains and perform ceremony regularly. A property, "Yellowin", in the nea by Blowering Valley was noted as an important meeting place for the Murray, Yass and local Aboriginal people. Large corroborees were held and the women camped there while the men travelled further into the mountains to perform ceremony.

During the 1840s and 1850s settlement continued with land being selected and taken up with grazing and cropping throughout the Tumut Valley. The township of Tumut was slow to develop. It was surveyed and laid out in 1848 and by 1856 comprised a school building, three hotels and a few huts. The first site for the town was down by the river near the current racecourse. This site was abandoned as a town centre after a major flood in 1952. During the late 1850s and 1860s in response to the activity accompanying the gold rushes in the area, the township began to take off and by the 1880s boasted 18 hotels, a blacksmith, a post office a courthouse and lockup, a local newspaper outfit and many other commercial services and residences.

As a consequence of settlement and the growth of the town Aboriginal people were more and more alienated from their traditional lands and tradition way of life. By the 1840s many local Aboriginal families were camped on a large pastoral station at Brungle which is close to the township of Tumut. By 1889 it was reported that 100 Aboriginal people resided there in what were described as huts with corrugated iron supplied by the Government. In fact the previous year the Aborigines Protection Board had built a weatherboard schoolhouse near the camp for Aboriginal children. The people subsisted on the Government Ration provided by the Aboriginal Protection Board, which by accounts was frugal and the people were expected to supplement this by hunting fishing and tending vegetable gardens.

In 1890 a small area of 1.2 hectares (3 acres) was gazetted as a reserve for a mission management precinct and a cottage was built for the first manager, Mr Usher. By 1909, with the establishment of the Aborigines Protection Act a further 142 acres of land coinciding with the Mission's housing area was gazetted and managed by a Government appointed manager who had far reaching control over the lives of the Aboriginal residents. Through the 1890s and into the twentieth century the Mission developed as a community village with the establishment of a dairy, cess pits for houses tree planting and various vegetable and crops raised there.

By 1940 Government philosophy towards the Government Reserves was changing and as a consequence the Mission Manager at Brungle was withdrawn. In 1941 the Board was encouraged to buy housing outside reserve areas and thus facilitate Aboriginal assimilation into towns. The Reserve officially closed in 1951. During this period of time conditions at Brungle reserve declined and by the later 1960s most families had left what remained of the Reserve and moved to Tumut or farther afield. During the 1980s Aboriginal families moved back to the reserve and new accommodation was erected.

=== The Theatre and its owner ===
The Montreal Community Theatre in Tumut was originally commissioned by John J. Learmont in the late 1920s. The name Montreal is an anagram of the name Learmont, declaring the family association with the building. The Learmont family had a long history in Tumut with John J's father John Learmont setting up a Draper and Mercer shop next door to the site of the Montreal Theatre in 1889. After a number of years John Learmont moved to Young, leaving his older sons living and engaged in business in Tumut. His younger son John J Learmont grew up in Young then return to Tumut where he also set up as a Draper and Mercer in an "empty shop" in Russell Street, Tumut in 1912. In 1927 John J Learmont applied to build a new brick shop on the north west side of the land on which the Montreal theatre stands.

He moved into the new premises in 1927 and by 1929 had commissioned the architects Kaberry and Chard, to design a moving picture theatre on the parcel of land to the south east of the shop. During the planning and design stages for the theatre John J Learmont is said to have maintained an active interest in the design and his son recalled his father's many visits to Sydney where he visited many theatres and took inspiration from their design features and decor details. The Learmont family still owns the adjacent shop which is now leased to as a Stock and Station Agent. The family also retained ownership of the theatre until 1998.

Kaberry and Chard, who commenced their partnership in around 1916, became well-established cinema and theatre architects in NSW and Australia. They designed over 150 theatres throughout Australia, 57 of these in NSW. Some of the NSW theatres designed by Kaberry and Chard included: the Lyric Wintergarden and the Lyceum in Sydney, both of which no longer stand; the Enmore Theatre in Sydney, which was extensively restyled in the 1930s, and a plethora of smaller theatres in the Sydney suburbs and rural towns in NSW. Most of these smaller theatres have been demolished or adapted. The Montreal Community Theatre in Tumut is one of only 3 Kaberry and Chard theatres remaining intact in NSW, the rest having been demolished or adapted beyond recognition.

The theatre at Tumut remains in its original condition apart from the removal of the splayed stage exit fins on the stage which were removed in 1955 to accommodate a cinemascope screen. The splayed fins as well as the design of the stepped loge boxes as part of the dress circle are two of the distinctive elements of Kaberry and Chard's design. The Athenium Theatre in Junee and the Roxy in Leeton are the other two extant theatres designed by this architectural partnership. The formerly carpeted foyer floor of the Montreal Community Theatre has also been tiled in a design sympathetic with the style of the theatre.

==== Laurantas family ====
The theatre was constructed by local builder Joseph Nyson and was completed by early 1930. By this time the lease on the theatre had been taken up by a Riverina-based entrepreneur of Greek origins, Nicholas Laurantas, his brother George Laurantas and a silent partner, B. Cummins.

Nicholas and George Laurantas had immigrated to Australia from the island of Kythera in Greece in 1908. After starting out working in small business in rural NSW, Nicholas quickly worked his way up to purchasing the business in which he worked in Grenfell. This was the beginning of his career as a businessman and entrepreneur in rural NSW and Sydney. Among his business interests were the ownership or leasing of a string of cinema theatres in the Riverina district including those at Gundagai, Cootamundra, Corowa, Lockhardt, the Montreal at Tumut, the Athenium in Junee and the Roxy in Leeton. George Laurantas was involved in managing several of Nicholas cinemas and other businesses, including rural farming properties.

Nicholas became a leader in the Australian Greek community and from early in his residence in Australia he provided assistance and advice to individuals. As his wealth grew Nicholas was able financially contribute to the preservation of Greek language and culture and the Greek community in Australia by assisting in the establishment of schools, the establishment of a Chair of Modern Greek at Sydney University and assistance to the residential and community based services for the aged, St Basil's Homes. For his contribution to his community and that of NSW and Australia he was knighted in 1979.

From its opening in April 1930, the day-to-day management of the Montreal Theatre was undertaken by Peter Stathis, brother in law of Nicholas and George Laurantas. One of the many tasks was to meet the local train to take delivery or send off the latest film to be shown as it did the rounds of the Laurantas managed cinemas in the Riverina. In the first years Peter also ran the refreshment room in front of the theatre. In 1945, operation of the cafe was taken over by Gerry Holmes who operated another cafe across the road. In later years the theatre shop has been leased to a number of businesses. In 1937 Peter bought the lease of the Montreal Theatre from Nicholas and George and he and then his sons leased it until 1965. During approximately the last 10 years of the Stathis family leasehold, day-to-day management was undertaken by Mr R. Duffas.

==== Opening ====
The opening of the theatre on 2 April 1930 was presided over by the local Shire President Mr Godfrey and a local, Stan MacKay was engaged to present a program of entertainment for the occasion. Stan provided another program on the following night and that weekend, on Saturday April 5 the "Opening Picture Attraction" featuring 'Douglas Fairbanks, the screen's most versatile star in the Greatest Achievement of His Glorious Career, The Iron Mask, an epic in photoplay production...' was screened.

==== Improvements ====
Since the 1930s the theatre has continued to present both film and live entertainment and has been the centre of cultural life in for the community providing a venue for dances fundraisers and charity drives and during the 1950s was a regular performance venue for the newly formed Tumut Review Club.

As well as being a major focus for the social life of the Tumut European community, the movie theatre was a highlight in the week of many of the young Aboriginal people living at the old Brungle Mission or Reserve who, in the 1930s, would ride their horses into Tumut after working on farms around Brungle, in order to see a film at the Montreal. Later in the early 1960s Sonia Piper and Elva Russell recall hitching a lift into Tumut to go to the pictures at the theatre.

Major technological improvements up until the 1960s included the installation in 1937 of a new Raco No 2 Sound Screen (unfortunately no evidence of the original sound system is to be found) and then in 1955 a new Brakewell cinemascope screen was installed in front of the proscenium arch. At this time the stage was widened by covering over a small orchestra pit and the stage exit fins removed.

From the 1970s through to 1998 the theatre was operated by a number of individuals for varying periods of time. It was put up for sale in 1993. At this time a campaign to save the theatre was begun and community interest was such that the theatre was taken off the market in 1994. A steering committee was formed to investigate the possible acquisition of the theatre and eventually an agreement was struck between the Blakeney Millar Foundation Trust, Tumut Council, the Learmont family and the Montreal Steering Committee to run a "living feasibility study". The Foundation provided $30,000 for the study and assistance to operate the theatre. In February 1995 the theatre was prepared for operation by a band of volunteers who painted and cleaned the theatre and sourced and installed second hand projectors, films and gas heaters. In April 1995 a grand opening variety night was held with a capacity audience.

Further maintenance and upgrading of the theatre was commenced in October 1995 with the assistance of a government training scheme.

In 1997-1998 the Steering Committee secured $40,000 in honoured pledged donations from the community and with the assistance of the Blakeney Millar Foundation the theatre was bought for the benefit of the local community. A Ministry of the Arts grant enabled the purchase and installation of a new screen and stage curtains and in 2000 reverse cycle air conditioning was installed. The roof was restored and painted in 2004. Much of this work was funded through NSW Heritage Council funding schemes.

== Description ==
=== Exterior ===
The Montreal Community Theatre is designed in the Inter-war Stripped Classical architectural style, a transitional style between the Classical and the later Moderne or Art Deco style. The theatre building comprises the theatre shop to the left of the theatre entrance, the foyer, box office, managers office auditorium and dress circle and the stage area with a small backstage area with kitchen storage and a dressing room.

The theatre's street facade is simple but imposing with a cantilevered awning extending across the front of the building above the footpath. Originally a pressed metal Wunderlich ceiling lined the underside of the awning. This was replaced by masonite sheeting and more recently by a new pressed metal ceiling. Above the awning the facade has two slim columns on either side and, a stepped parapet with coping. Within the columns on either side are windows with glazed panes and panels with rendered frames. In the centre the framed word Montreal is written in render. Above this are three projection room windows, capped by a small awning.

Below the large footpath awning are four sets of glazed timber framed double doors, approached by a set of steps from the footpath. Above the entry doors are decorative glass panels. The theatre shop has two large windows either side of a recessed entry with a timber and glass door. The same decorative glass panels as over the entry doors of the theatre lie above the door and windows of the shop.

At the rear of the theatre are two sets of toilets for patron's use.

=== Entrance Foyer ===
Inside the entry is a small foyer, on the rear wall in a central position is the box office with the original copper security grille. Above the box office are vents covered with a striking spider web pattern. Steps on either side of the box office lead to the auditorium. The foyer was originally carpeted but is now tiled in white with a central star motif in black tiles and a border of black tiles. In the mid 1980s the walls were papered with a flock wall paper. Subsequently, they have been painted. Hung in the foyer are the original architectural plans for the theatre and original light fittings On the south east side of the foyer is a staircase leading to the dress circle.

=== Auditorium ===
A narrow hallway extends the width of the building between the foyer and auditorium which provides access to the auditorium and also the emergency exit on the northern side of the building. A glass case stands in the hall which contains moveable items relating to the operation of the theatre.

The auditorium floor is of timber and the aisles are covered with carpet reflecting the colour and design of the original linoleum floor covering. The dress circle is cantilevered with loge boxes stepped towards the stage along both sides of the theatre. They are now used to accommodate lights and sound system.

The roof is vaulted with a geometric design of sunken panels which give both an unimpeded view of the stage from all positions in the theatre and provide an impressive and pleasing design finish to the space. A pressed metal cornice of egg and dart pattern along the top of the northern and southern walls of the theatre. While most of the seats in the theatre have been replaced, a number of the original blue leather and velvet seats remain in situ including a couple of the "love seats". Each row of original seating ends with a wrought iron support.

At the rear of the dress circle are the projection box, work room and store room. None of the original projectors remain but there is one Cumming and Wilson projector similar to that originally used at the theatre.

The walls of the auditorium are bagged and painted deep cream and dados and window ledges picked out in Indian Red. Large windows along the north and south walls of the theatre have shutters which are detailed similarly to the spider web air vents. The shutters are casement shutters downstairs and are opened using a sliding mechanism in the dress circle. Originally, in the absence of air conditioning the shutters were essential to providing air and comfort to the audience. Further control of temperature and airflow was provided by the Venturi air ventilation system, consisting of a set of air vents in the walls of the auditorium which drew cool air from the sub floor area which rose to the roof as it heated and was drawn outside through a set of large vents in the ceiling. The air vents were opened in summer and closed in winter when the theatre needed to be warmed. The system is no longer used but is still in situ. Original night lights are located along the walls of the auditorium and the exits are marked both by modern exit lights and the original kerosene emergency lighting system.

The stage is defined by a large decorative proscenium arch made from pressed metal and featuring deep cove and an egg and dart pattern painted in blue, off white and gold. The stage curtains are blue velvet with gold embroidery. These were purchased by the Montreal Community Theatre committee from a production of Beauty and the Beast. The floor of the stage has been enlarged firstly in the 1970s by covering in a small orchestra pit. This facilitated use by local schools. More recently it has been further enlarged to accommodate a full symphony orchestra and also school "spectacular" style performances. The decorative stage exit fins were removed in 1955 to allow the installation of a cinemascope screen. More recently an electrically controlled screen has been fitted to facilitate the theatres program of both film and live performance.

=== Backstage area ===
The backstage area is small and contains storage and ropes for curtains and sets. Behind the stage is a small dressing room and a small greenroom/kitchen. There is also a storage area under the floor of the auditorium.

=== Moveable heritage items ===
There is a collection of moveable items some of which are associated with the theatre from the early years of its operation including:

- a set of ticket dispensing boxes and ticket stub boxes
- a 1930s pedestal fan;
- a set of hand made timber and glass exit signs;
- the original stage curtain valance;
- a 1930s Cumming and Wilson, 35-millimetre (1.4 in), silent movie projector fitted with Raaco sound heads which utilised a carbon arc lamp; and
- the reel box associated with this projector containing spent and unspent carbon arc lamps.

Many of the moveable items have been in storage for a number of years and are yet to be catalogued. A catalogue of moveable heritage will be produced indicating items originally associated with the theatre. This will be revised from time to time and the Director of the Heritage Branch notified.

=== Condition ===
As at 7 May 2004, very good.

=== Modifications and dates ===
Major modifications include:

- 1955 – Decorative stage exit fins removed to allow for Cinema Scope Screen;
- 1992 – Refurbishment of foyer undertaken;
- 1998 – Refurbishment of proscenium and curtains; and
- 2003 – Restoration of roof and vents.

== Heritage listing ==
As at 12 March 2013, the Montreal Community Theatre was of state heritage significance as a fine and rare example of an intact interwar movie theatre in rural NSW from the period where cinema going was a predominant leisure activity in Australia. The theatre has been in continuous operation as a cinema and live theatre and a social focus for the community for over 80 years. Its heritage significance at a state level is increased as rural theatres are lost through demolition and redevelopment. Only 11 theatres recognisable as such remained in 2008 of 351 surveyed in 1951. It is also historically significant as it demonstrates, through its management by Sir Nicholas Laurantas and his family, the importance of the Greek community in the development of cinema in NSW and Australia, especially in rural areas.

Its historic values are enhanced through its association with the architectural partnership, Karberry and Chard, well regarded and prolific theatre architects, who designed over 150 theatres throughout Australia, 57 of these in NSW. It is also associated with the noted philanthropist Sir Nicholas Laurantas and his family who managed the Montreal as one of their network of cinemas in the Riverina area.

The theatre is a rare, fine and representative example of a cinema theatre in the Interwar Stripped Classical style designed by architects Karberry and Chard and is a landmark in the streetscape. It has social significance as it is highly valued by the Tumut and wider district community as demonstrated in the public campaign to raise money to purchase the building in 1998.

The theatre contains a number of moveable items associated with its history of operation.

Its intact condition and layout including the former milk bar/refreshment room incorporated in the theatre building, as well as the history of its operation is able to yield valuable information on the development of cinematography and cinema going in rural NSW for the past 80 years or more.

Montreal Community Theatre was listed on the New South Wales State Heritage Register on 21 June 2013 having satisfied the following criteria.

The place is important in demonstrating the course, or pattern, of cultural or natural history in New South Wales.

The Montreal Community Theatre and Moveable Heritage Collection in Tumut is of state heritage significance as a rare example of an intact interwar cinema/live theatre in rural NSW from the period where cinema-going was fast becoming a predominant leisure activity in Australia, especially in rural areas with limited entertainment options available.

It is one of only three intact theatres in NSW designed by the noted and prolific theatre architects Karberry and Chard who designed over 57 theatres in NSW and 151 in Australia.

First managed by (Sir) Nicholas Laurantas and his brother George and later his brother-in-law, the theatre also demonstrates the important role of the Greek community in the development of cinema in the Australian community, especially in rural areas. The theatre is a now rare demonstration of the continuity of an historical activity as it has continuously presented films and live theatre for over 82 years from 1930 to the present day .

The place has a strong or special association with a person, or group of persons, of importance of cultural or natural history of New South Wales's history.

The Montreal Community Theatre is of state heritage significance for its association with Sir Nicholas Laurantas who initially managed the theatre with his brother George, passing on the role to his brother in law Peter Stathsis. Sir Nicholas was knighted for his charity work and work with the Greek community over the years after he immigrated to Australia in 1908. Among his works were substantial donations towards the St Basils homes for the elderly and toward the establishment of a chair of modern Greek at the University of Sydney.

The theatre is also of significance through its association with the architectural partnership Karberry and Chard. These architects were talented and prolific designers of theatres in Australia including the Wintergarden and the Lyceum in Sydney.

The place is important in demonstrating aesthetic characteristics and/or a high degree of creative or technical achievement in New South Wales.

The Montreal Community theatre is of state heritage significance as a fine example of a cinema theatre designed in the Interwar Stripped Classical style which while based on a classical elements, omitted or reduced ornamentation. In Australia it was a transitional style between Interwar Academic Classical and Art Deco. Karberry and Chard's concern with functional design is also reflected in the striking lattice auditorium ceiling where the structure and construction, through carpentry provides a visually pleasing effect.

Similarly to other small towns, this theatre's imposing and distinctive facade make it an outstanding contribution to the streetscape. Where as at one time this landmark quality was common in NSW towns, this is no longer the case due to the disappearance of small rural theatres and this increases the Montreal's landmark values to a state level.

The place has a strong or special association with a particular community or cultural group in New South Wales for social, cultural or spiritual reasons.

The Montreal Community Theatre is of state heritage significance as an increasingly rare example of a small rural theatre being the centre of social and leisure activity and community life for a period of more than 80 years. Its ongoing importance to the community is demonstrated by the fact that it was purchased by a local community organisation through fundraising in Tumut in 1997.

The place has potential to yield information that will contribute to an understanding of the cultural or natural history of New South Wales.

The virtually intact condition of the Montreal Community Theatre, its offices box office, backstage area, auditorium and moveable heritage as well as its history or "story" can yield information which contributes to an understanding of NSW cultural history and the history and role of cinemas in NSW. The building and its contents demonstrate the growth and development of cinematography and cinema going for the past 80 years or more.

The place possesses uncommon, rare or endangered aspects of the cultural or natural history of New South Wales.

The Montreal Theatre in Tumut is a rare example of an interwar country cinema designed in the Interwar Stripped Classical architectural style. In 1951 there were 351 cinemas in NSW. In 2008, the Montreal Community Theatre was one of only 11 still recognisable as theatres, the rest having been redeveloped or demolished. It is one of 3 remaining Karbury and Chard designed cinema theatres in NSW. Karbury and Chard originally designed 57 theatres in NSW and 151 in Australia.

The place is important in demonstrating the principal characteristics of a class of cultural or natural places/environments in New South Wales.

The Montreal Community Theatre is a fine example of a cinema theatre designed in the Interwar Stripped Classical style by noted and prolific theatre architects, Karberry and Chard. It is one of a remaining group of 3 cinema theatres in NSW designed by these architects and features plain panelled, stepped loge boxes and formerly the splayed exit fins typical of their theatre design.

== See also ==
- Australian non-residential architectural styles
