= Athenium Theatre =

Theatre at The Broadway, Junee New South Wales, Australia

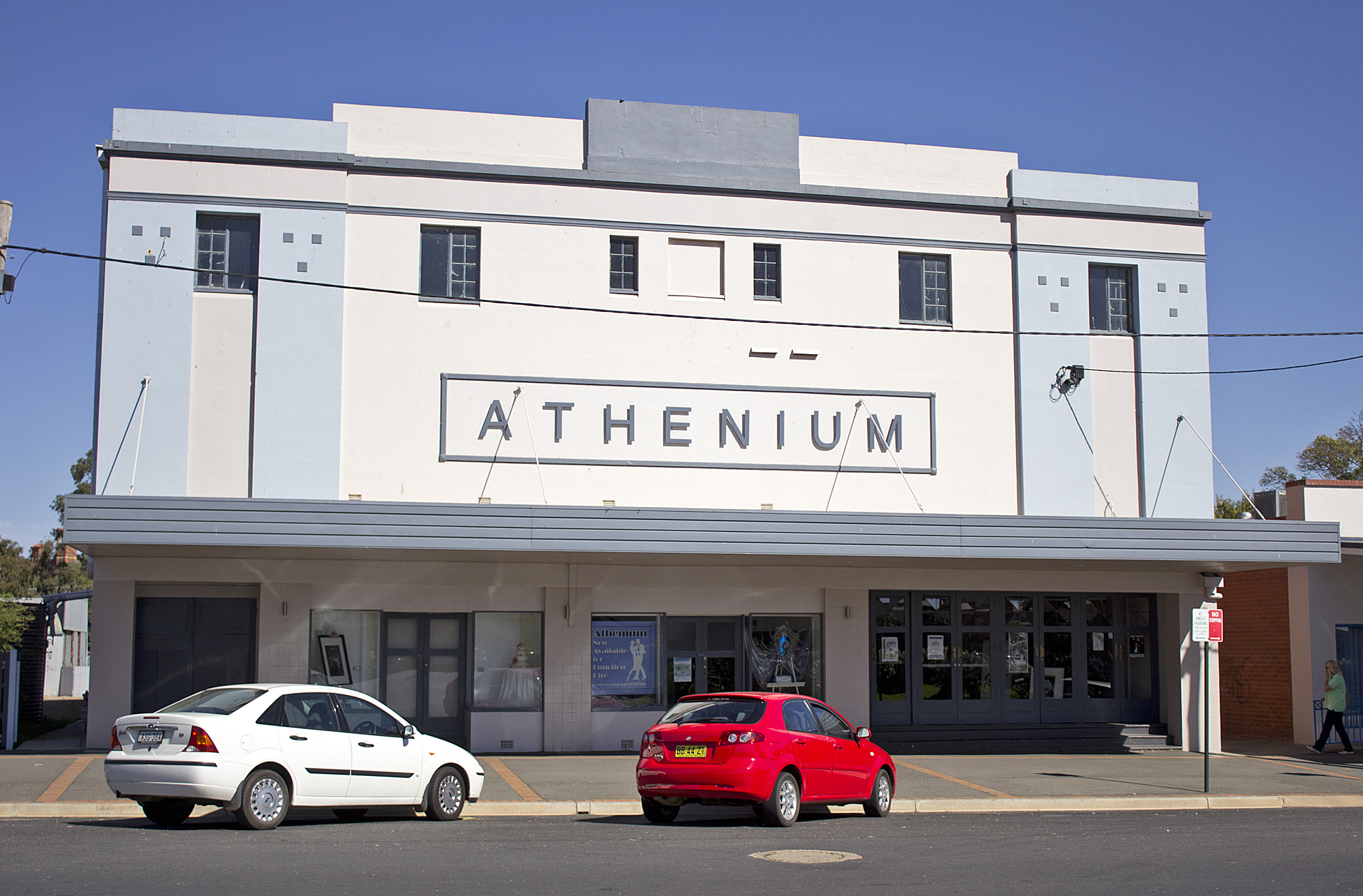

- Location within New South Wales Location within Australia
- 34.8680°S 147.5821°E
- Location: The Broadway, Junee, Junee Shire, New South Wales, Australia

History
- Built: 1929–1929

Site notes
- Architect: Kaberry and Chard
- Owner: Junee Shire Council

New South Wales Heritage Register
- Official name: Athenium Theatre; Broadway Theatre; JADDA Centre
- Type: state heritage (built)
- Designated: 9 January 2004
- Reference no.: 1687
- Type: Theatre
- Category: Recreation and Entertainment
- Builders: J. Nyssen

Athenium Theatre is a heritage-listed former theatre and cinema and now community hall at The Broadway, Junee, in the Riverina region of New South Wales, Australia. It was designed by Kaberry and Chard and built in 1929 by J. Nyssen. It is also known as the Broadway Theatre and JADDA Centre. The property is owned by Junee Shire Council. It was added to the New South Wales State Heritage Register on 9 January 2004.

== History ==
=== Chronology ===
- c. 1894. Gearge Laurantus was born in Kythira, Greece. (His brother, Nicholas was five years his senior.)
- c. 1909. George emigrates to Australia, first working in Sydney, then for brother Nicholas who had bought a cafe in a country town, then the Globe Theatre, Narrandera.
- 1925. Nicholas Laurantus's Globe Theatre is destroyed by fire. He rebuilds.
- 1927. The new Globe Theatre opens. Nicholas wishes to develop a "chain" of cinemas as a means of getting a better deal on film hire.
- c. 1928. Nicholas joins Ben Cummins, Junee, to build a new theatre in the Broadway; he puts brother George in charge of the Lyceum and overseeing the building of the new theatre.
- 1929. In May, Theatres and Public Halls gives approval to build. On 10 October the theatre opens as the Athenium Theatre.
- 1935. Nicholas and Gearge build the Rio Theatre at Lockhart.
- 1939. Nicholas decides to buy a property outside of Narrandera, decides to sell his theatre interest in Junee, forces George to give up management of the Athenium to go out and manage the property while Nicholas resides in town.
- c. 1940. Robert Tilby Begg takes over the theatre.
- 1950. R J and E E Pollard buy and run the theatre, renaming it Broadway.
- 1954. The Pollards sell on to Albert Thomas Manion for his son Kevin and daughter-in-law, Yvonne to manage (purchase price 28 000 pounds $56 000).
- 1958. The theatre is transferred into a company, Broadway Theatre (Junee) Pty Ltd, of which Kevin Manion and Thomas A Wah are directors
- 1959. The proscenium is removed, as was the custom to provide a wider opening for Cinemascope presentation. Kevin Manion sells out to a T A Wah who is sole owner under the company until 1971.
- 1971. Theatre licence is cancelled and the building is placed up for sale.
- 1977–78. Bought by Junee and District Development Association for $20 000, which makes the Junee and Illabo Councils trustees (virtual owners) of the property as tenants in common. Alterations to make it useful for indoor sports as well as social events, costing $45 000. Funding by community donations. A new licence is issued.
- 1984. Junee Council appears to be taking greater interest. Theatres and Public Halls initiates a search as to who or what actually owns the building.
- 1990. Theatres and Public Halls Act is repealed and a new Act transfers licensing, inspections etc. to local councils.
- 1998. The exterior is repainted, the refreshment bar kitchen is re-equipped at a cost of $28 000.
- 2002–03. The Junee Shire Council wishes to demolish the theatre.

For over fifty years before the coming of local television in 1964, cinema, as in other country towns, cities and suburbs, would provide not only entertainment but tacit cultural learning in behaviour, design, fashion, and current events. All the cinema venues in Junee would also provide the facility for live entertainment and social events, such as balls and receptions, since all possessed "flat" floors.

The Globe theatre in Junee was showing films by 1917, screened on Tuesday and Saturday in a small hall in Lisgar Street. By 1922, Lyceum Pictures were also showing in the larger Lyceum Hall, also in Lisgar Street The Globe appeared to disappear from the available local newspaper advertisements from 1924 while the Lyceum continued with films and live shows.

The Cummins' family of Junee owned the Lyceum. Ben Cummins decided to seek a partnership with some local cinema entrepreneur to build a new picture theatre. He consulted a brother-in-law, Jack Cavellas (who himself was a cinema entrepreneur and subsequently merged his assets with Hoyts Theatres). It seemed that Cavellas had misgivings about Ben Cummins forming a partnership with Nicholas Laurantus, but Cummins did, resulting in his becoming a "silent" partner in the deal. The new theatre would be under the control of Nicholas Laurantus, but with the day-to-day management by his younger brother, George.

George settled in Junee as soon as he married in 1928. He assumed management of the Lyceum Theatre. The theatre was in wide use for live shows, benefits and dancers, featuring performances by artists such as Gladys Moncrieff.

Approval was given for erection of the new theatre on 1 May 1929. The architects, Kaberry and Chard, wrote to say the theatre was about half completed by early July. George Laurantus, from his office at the Lyceum, wrote on 5 October seeking permission to open on the 10th of that month. The local police, representing Theatres and Public Halls, were asked to make an inspection to see that the theatre complied with the Departments requirements, and if so, allow it to open that day. The full report by the police at Junee on 17 October gave the seating capacity as dress circle 410 and stalls 600. A licence was granted to G. Laurantus for general entertainment purposes from 10 October 1929 for 1010 persons. Notes from Les Tod indicate the builder to be J. Nyssen.

Peter Laurantus related that from the opening until the birth of their first child in 1931 his father and mother did everything his father doing the sign-writing for the film attractions (on the front of the awning), booking films, despatching them and projecting them. His mother sold tickets and retained the records for the entertainment tax and film hire (particularly percentage) charges. In 1931, Blanche Heffernan, formerly Cummins became employed in the ticket office. She was the seventeen-year-old daughter of Ben Cummins (the "silent partner" in the venture), and remained working at the theatre until she married in December 1936.

The theatre opened two weeks before the New York stock market crash, and the Great Depression that followed. But the taxable admission figures for 1928 were showing a decline in admissions to picture theatres before the Depression. Perhaps the novelty of silent films was wearing thin, particularly as wireless was now developing. The Laurantus' had to work hard, but fortunately, after an initial poor quality, sound films rapidly improved and even with the Depression attendances quickly rose. From Census figures for income and employment for 1933, Junee was in a considerably better position than many other towns and shires. Even so, Blanche Heffernan remembers how itinerants, looking for work, but only being allowed to stay in a town for one or two nights before being moved on, were allowed to come into the theatre and stand at the back for a while in order to warm themselves up. Farmers, who were possibly "doing it tougher" than, say, railway employees, were allowed to come in at half time and half price to see the main movie.

In one of the regular police reports to T&PH; (11/2/38) on maintenance of the theatre, it was noted that movies were shown six days a week except for about seven times a year when dances or concerts were held (on single nights). In a note by George Laurantus, he says that the theatre is used for a Saturday matinee and every night. With the Sunday Observance Act in operation at the time this would mean Monday to Saturday for showing films with perhaps a free event such as a concert by one of the church choirs on Sunday. Blanche Heffernan remembered that every church had a ball, the ambulance would present plays, Sorley's touring variety show would perform at the theatre, as too would McKays'. The locals put on The Mikado one year. As late as the 1960s, White Horse Inn was being performed for a three-night season. Of course during World War II, the only visual news was via the filmed newsreels, both Australian and International editions; there were also special advertising films and foyer posters to encourage patrons to buy War Bonds and War Savings Certificates; and there were the patriotic balls, concerts and competitions such as the Spitfire [fighter aircraft] Queen Competition of 1941, with its crowning ceremony at the Athenium Theatre.

The theatre was also used during the daytime, its flat floor in the stalls being suitable for dancing lessons. Blanche Heffernan taught ballet there two days a week until she married and moved to her husband's farm.

Since its opening George Laurantus had an eye for good publicity. Advertisements in the local newspaper became large with large type so they could not be missed. He would shift his programs to suit the films available and his audience. By the start of 1935 he was having a "bargain night on Monday with one program, a second program on Tuesday, Wednesday, Thursday, and a third program on Friday, Saturday. Each would be a double-bill feature program with newsreel, travelogue or carton, a serial for the weekend, and of course, trailers for coming attractions. All films were transhipped by train to and from different distributors, and to and from different towns, with about 50 percent coming from and being despatched back to Sydney. This meant receiving and despatching from Junee station some fifteen or sixteen films per week.

The Athenium had another link with the railway (apart from film delivery). In the Junee Southern Cross for 11 February 1935 there is an advertisement for the Junee Railway Jubilee Gala Performance for Wednesday 20th of that month. There was to be a film at 7:00pm, followed by presentation of service medals to railway employees by the Chief Commissioner of New South Wales Government Railways, then a concert and dancing until 1:00am the next morning. The last included the finals and judging of the National Dancing Competition. This six hour marathon concert illustrates how the Athenium Theatre doubled up as a town hall.

Picture theatres, in those times, did not possess their own candy bar. Often there would be a small shop in the theatre building that was a milk-bar, but this could rarely cater for the crowd that rushed out at interval between the two feature films. At Junee, Allan McEwan, Dal Eisenhauer and Blanche Heffernan remember how a few early exiting patrons would get into the small milk-bar in the shop next to the theatre lobby, but the great rush was across the two roadways and the garden strip to the Allies Cafe in the Broadway Stores building to get a milkshake, cordial drink, ice cream, a bar of chocolate or packet of Minties (no popcorn or coffees). Sensibly, the same Greek proprietor, from about 1935 Peter John Prineas of the island of Kythera assisted by his wife Nancy (nee MacDonald), ran both milk-bars, thus maximising his business.

George Laurantus renewed the licence in 1938, still a manager, but in September 1940, the renewal application is by Robert Tilby Begg as owner. Upon calculating from the year of birth of his daughter and her age when she left Junee, the Laurantus family would have left the town around the end of 1939.

In 1941 the toilets were supposed to be connected to the recently reticulated town sewer. In 1942 Robert Begg was castigated by Theatres and Public Halls for changing the seating plan without prior approval. He reduced the stalls to 475 and the circle to 386. Once the toilet situation was mentioned in 1941, it became a saga with the authority which wanted changes and upgrades. It was finally settled in 1947 according to a July police report on the T&PH; file. On 29 March 1950, Begg agreed to transfer the licence (No 50580 for the Athenium Theatre) to R. J. and E. E. Pollard, another husband and wife team who write to say they are the owners.

Mr and Mrs Pollard renamed the theatre the Broadway, according to the licence issued on 10 October 1950 (T&PH;). The Pollards said they were the owners on 11 April that year, but it is on 8 March 1952 that the Pollards sign under the letterhead banner of the Broadway Theatre Company. They were reporting the destruction of a spool of film by fire in the top magazine of the projector (T&PH;).

The Pollards sold the theatre to Albert Thomas Manion on 28 September 1954 (T&PH;) for £28,000 ($56,000) according to his daughter in law. As with earlier owners it was a husband and wife team who operated the theatre. They were Albert Manion's son, Kevin, and his wife Yvonne, Kevin Manion selecting films and projecting, while his wife worked in the ticket box and did the accounting (although once she made a wide projection screen by joining two screens on a Singer Sewing Machine with two men supporting the large heavy material). Chairs were becoming "tatty" and inspections showed that some needed reupholstering. On 29 December 1958 the Fire Brigade, in one of its regular reports, noticed the proscenium opening being enlarged to permit a wider screen, Theatres and Public Halls wrote back to Mr Albert Thomas Manion, as licence-holder, pointing out that work could not proceed without approval.

Earlier in 1958 the Registrar General's Land Titles Office showed a transfer to the Broadway Theatre (Junee) Pty Ltd (with a mortgage to the Commercial Bank of Australia) on 30 May. From a letterhead for correspondence about the theatre, dated 5 February 1959, the company directors are shown as T. A. Wah and K. C. Manion (T&PH;). Yvonne Kingsford-Archer says that this new arrangement was organised when Mr Manion senior wished to withdraw. She had reservations about Tom Wah since he seemed to lack any suitable skills for theatre operation, so she left the theatre for another business occupation, the local newsagency. Sometime in the first half of 1959 Tom Wah bought out Kevin's shares in the company. In applying for a renewal for the licence on 10 October 1960, Wah is described as managing director. (A search of computerised company records indicated that it had been wound up many years ago.)

The problem of the widened proscenium was only concluded when the Junee Council's building inspector was asked to report. The reply (1/12/60) to T&PH; stated that the reinforced truss, to increase the stage opening from 27 ft 4ins to 36 ft 4ins was structurally sound. On other matters, the place seemed to deteriorate, yet local television had not yet commenced - it would in 1964. Sgt C. E. Riordan of Junee Police reported (15/12/63) "In my opinion, Wah is making little or no effort to complete the outstanding items" of repairs. It then became a saga of decline.

In 1966 the Junee Municipal Council toyed with the idea of buying it, but did not. The licensing authority became more frustrated with Thomas Wah's procrastination and his ideas that never came to fruition. On 15 July 1969, the Police reported that Wah could not make the required alterations to the theatre due to financial problems. Certainly, attendances for films had dwindled and they were only being shown a couple of times a week until a local police sergeant made his report on 21 December 1970: "I have to report that the Broadway Theatre, Junee, is now closed and has been so for a period of about two months. The proprietor, Mr T. A. Wah has left Junee and is now residing in the Sydney area."

The NSW Fire Brigades subsequently obtained advice from Miss L. Wah, sister of the previous correspondent, Mr T .A. Wah that the building "is now closed and no continuation of the licence is required and that the premises are up for sale". Theatres and Public Halls then cancelled the theatre's license as of 21 January 1971. The file was closed.

The Junee and District Development Association (JADDA) was formed at a public meeting on 25 October 1975 to "promote social, recreational, cultural and commercial activities within the Junee and Illabo local government areas" (according to its Constitution). On 25 November 1977, JADDA bought the Athenium Theatre, with the Junee and Illabo councils jointly accepting trusteeship of the property. The purchase price of $20,000 was provided exclusively by the Association with no money put in by the councils.

In an application for a licence, note was made that the cost of building works for repairs to ceiling, floor, painting etc. was $45,000. This together with the $20,000 purchase price accords with the $60,000 claimed to have been raised from the community by Alan McEwan and Dal Eisenhauer (in their interview, 2003). Because of the trusteeship vested in the local councils, it virtually meant that the community had given some $60,000 to the councils.

JADDA wrote to the Theatres and Public Halls administration on 7 December 1977 seeking the reopening of the building as a theatre. In December 1978 there was a letter suggesting that JADDA wished to screen 35 mm films again. The projection box regulatory standards had changed since the theatre was previously licensed, thus requiring enlargement for re-use. Although plans were prepared for a smoke-lock to the projection box (13/11/81), the changes and proposal to show films was dropped.

However, there were subsequent issues with a secretary not replying to mail, a mass resignation by the organisation's executive, and further non-response to inquiries by Theatres and Public Halls. This promoted the authority to seek a search of the property's title by the Registrar General's Office in 1985. Because of organisational difficulties the Theatres and Public Halls authority decided (after the titles search) to correspond with Junee Council (11/3/85). As a result of the community group having faltered, the Junee Council took control of the building. A report from the Government Architect noted that, under the regulations in existence in 1985, the exits only allowed for a capacity of 350 in the dress circle and 400 in the stalls. A photograph, attached to a report (28/5/86), shows the colour scheme of 1978 grey, blue and white.

Alterations in 1986 reduced some of the decorative qualities of the interior and exterior perhaps attempting to "modernise" the building. At that time there was little knowledge of heritage (unless it was an early 19th-century building), the Heritage Act for NSW only recently coming into effect. Lights and neon was stripped from the facade, dark tiles on the shop fronts were overpainted, the ticket box was removed, the timber decoration on the ceiling was either covered over or removed, the side-wall shutters were replaced by windows, and the lights on the Art Deco back plates, and dress circle balustrade vine and trellis motifs, were removed.

The 1908 Theatres and Public Halls Act and the Public Halls (General) Regulation, 1977, were repealed in 1990. New legislation, the Local Government (Theatres and Public Halls) Amendment Act, 1989 came into effect. It transferred licensing inspection etc. responsibilities to councils.

In 1998 the exterior was painted, and additions made to the shop that had become the kitchen. This was undertaken partly with a grant from the NSW Heritage Office, the total cost, according to the Heritage Office being $28,000. Due partly to insurance "problems" that plagued community groups and councils, following the collapse of the HIH Insurance Group, the theatre closed as a general recreation centre.

In 2003, the Junee Shire Council sought to demolish the building to build a new medical centre. After public controversy, the building was given an interim heritage listing in May and saved from demolition when it was listed on the State Heritage Register in November.

The building was subsequently reopened, refurbished to a modern standard, and reverted to its former name of the Athenium Theatre.

In 2016, the theatre received donations of a new screen and grand piano. In 2017, members of the local community renovated the theatre's dress circle, which had been out of bounds for more than 20 years. In 2018, it received $48,800 in funding to install new lighting and sound systems.

As of 2018, the building is available for hire as a community hall.

Role of Greek immigrants in the cinema industry

The Athenium Theatre represents Greek immigrant interest in operating cinemas in NSW for 50 years from c. 1910

The immigration of Greek nationals to NSW showed marked differences in economic sustainability for those who came before 1950 compared to those who arrived during the mass immigration period following World War II. Prior to World War II the numbers of Greek immigrants were small and followed a system of chain migration. That is, one or two members of a family arrived, worked for other Greeks, set themselves up in some form of business, then sponsored one or more members of the family or friends, to come out and work in that business. Businesses were not set up to service other Greeks but to serve the Anglo-Celtic population.

These immigrants frequently went to country towns to set themselves up in a small catering type of business - food shops or cafes that prepared Australian-style meals. A number then moved into motion picture presentation in the same towns, again providing fare for the Anglo-Celtic population. Becoming managers of picture theatres also provided Greek immigrants with greater standing in town communities and allowed them to be better integrated into those communities.

Greek immigrants of the 19th and early 20th centuries mainly came from islands, (particularly Kythera), coastal towns and inland villages with what is described as a peasant background, often with little, if any, formal education. Between 1911 and 1947 almost half of those who arrived in NSW settled in non-metropolitan areas.

From around 1915 to the early 1960s 116 country picture theatres in NSW were at some time operated by 66 Greek immigrants in 57 towns. Thirty-four new picture theatres were built by Greek exhibitors in these towns. It is known that at least 61 of these immigrants were proprietors of their own food businesses by the time they branched into the motion picture exhibition business.

The Laurantus brothers fitted this model of arrival. Nicholas went to a Greek-run country cafe. George worked in Sydney until Nicholas bought the cafe, then he went to work for his brother, who although looked after the family was domineering like a father. George arrived from the island of Kythera in 1908/9. By the 1920s Nicholas had bought the Globe (later Plaza) Theatre, Narrandera; it burnt down in 1925 and the new one opened in 1927. This would be where George developed his flair for showmanship. He taught himself violin, would perform, and generally loved show business. He married in 1928 and settled in Junee to look after Nicholas's cinema interest in that town. It was a partnership with Ben Cummins, a local businessman. The three of them leased the Montreal Theatre, Tumut, then handed its operation over to a brother-in-law of the Laurantus'. They did the same with the Gundagai Theatre. In 1935 the Rio Theatre was built by Nicholas or the two brothers in partnership (depending upon what story is related). In 1936 Nicholas built the Rex Theatre at Corowa.

in 1939 he wanted to pull out of the cinema. Whereas other members of the family stayed at Gundagai and Tumut, Nicholas required George to give up Junee and look after a property he owned out of Narrandera. It would be five years before George could leave and obtain a picture theatre at Liverpool, Sydney, on his own terms.

According to his son and daughter, George was quite bitter, resenting his having to leave Junee. He loved the town and the Athenium Theatre. He painted all the billboards that announced the films for the wide fascia on the awning. He enjoyed setting up promotional floats and events. For On Our Selection (made 1931) he had a Dad, Mum and Dave with horse and old fashioned plough standing on the wide nature strip in the centre of the Broadway. Huge billboards covered the sides of a truck to advertise Janet Gaynor in Delicious (booked for four nights c.1932). A float that completely covered a small truck drove around town advertising Motion Picture Art in the Musical Gem, City of Song with Betty Stockfield. It is obvious from these examples from photos in Peter Laurantus's possession, and the gusto with which benefits and gala nights were organised, that George was an asset to Junee.

Where Greek immigrants had picture theatres they controlled their town's principal entertainment at a time when the overall population attended the cinema on average from 20 to 31 times a year at a time. It was also at a time when there were no registered clubs, no evening opening of hotels, no television, and virtually no professional sport. They [the Greek showmen] had direct input into the moral and social values of the communities in which they operated. They brought national and international events to the rural areas in the form of feature films, newsreels and documentaries.(Cork,1998)

== Description ==
The Athenium Theatre possesses a wide, imposing front, similar to many theatres that used to exist in towns that were mostly larger than Junee and in the more populated suburbs of Sydney now almost all gone. Its landmark quality is observed when one enters the town from the north and glances across the railway crossing.

The Exterior

The building is substantial, built in brick with a cement-rendered facade. There is a hung cantilevered awning with a deep fascia, below which are two shopfronts and doors to the theatre. The awning fascia and soffit appear to have been replaced in recent years. The shops have glass show-windows and tiled piers and plinths which have been over-painted. Glazed doors to the theatre are at the north-western end of the front and, if not original, appear to contain original leadlight upper panes. Above the awning are double piers (or "slimmed-down" pilasters) at each end supporting an entablature and small cornice. A little below the entablature is a row of seven windows. Two, each end, light the rear of the dress circle; the central three (the central one currently blocked out) are for the projection box. In size, they are all functional, but their composition, in relation to the whole facade was originally dependent upon the theatre sign, on a dark panel, with one lamp above, and bracketed lamps between the twin piers at each end. If the proportion of some of the windows may seem strange today, there was originally a unifying effect through the repetition of the same pane proportion and size. Each window was a multiple of the same size and shape pane in what appear to have been steel framed, modern industrial-type windows of the time (1920s). Apart from one being blocked out completely, most of the others have had large pane replacements, quite unsympathetic to the original. The pane proportion on the original was important for it is close to those in Georgian buildings in NSW, such as Macquarie Fields', or Glenfield houses. But, unlike the windows in these early 19th-century houses, the repetition of panes is different. The Georgian examples are three across and four up, whereas those larger of the seven windows at the Athenaeum Theatre have four across, to suit the casement of steel-framed windows, and four up. The multi-pane windows should be reinstated to suit the classical style of the building.

Apart from the spherical opalescent ball lamps bracketed out from the facade wall, there were originally three more, supported on metal decorative standards, about one metre tall off the top of the parapet wall. Only one existed on the parapet in a 1954 photograph. In addition, the parapet was outlined in neon tubing, as too was the sign-panel, together with vertical decorative neon on each of the four piers. Around the outer edges of the underside of the awning was a continuous white-way strip of neon (according to Mrs Kingsford-Archer, formerly Manion, who operated the theatre from 1954–59).

The sides of the building did not originally possess windows but, instead, had vertically sliding timber framed and sheeted panels (or shutters). The position of the runners can be seen on the brickwork. The panels would be slid down partially or wholly at night for ventilation, the total opening being the size of the current glazed area. The panels were also divided into timber "panes" of Georgian proportion. The present aluminium-framed windows appear serendipitous, without much consideration for the original design.

Over the 74-year history of the building the toilets, at the rear, have "progressed" from unsewered outhouses to sewered brick additions with access from within the building.

Architectural style of the exterior

The facade of the theatre is what might be termed "slimmed-down classical". Before Art Deco style hit Australia this earlier design expresses that transition between Classical and lack-of-decoration Functional. It was obviously not influenced by theatre architecture of USA which was overlaid with decoration and, by 1930, was just beginning to change Classical, Renaissance, Mayan, Spanish, Tudor, Moorish and Chinese decor to Art Deco without a pause for the Modern Movement that emanated from Europe. It would be 1932 when USA recognised the Modern Movement that they termed the "International Style." Even in Britain only a few picture theatres were being designed with more simplicity in 1929. There was the Pavilion at Shepherds Bush, London, in 1923 it winning an award from the Royal Institute of British Architects (RIBA) with large expanses of plain brick walling beneath its classical cornice. The Odeon at Kensington, London, (1926) showed a design style moving away from classical, but still with a cornice and entablature As many Australian architects belonged to the RIBA or subscribed to English architectural journals, Kaberry (originally an Englishman) and Chard may well have pored over these "less pure" and somewhat simplified classical designs. Depending upon the journals seen at the time it may have been that the architects were more influenced by Swedish design which went from classical adornment to minimalist classical, almost unadorned buildings, from 1925 to 1930. Certainly such simplicity preceded the arrival of the Modern Movement Expressionist designs of Eric Mendelsohn the most influential being the Universum Cinema, Berlin, of 1928 that so influenced Guy Crick and Bruce Furse in their Kings Theatres designs from 1935 (Thorne & Cork, 1994: introduction).

The Interior

The front lobby is small with the principal stair to the dress circle to the right, against the sidewall. The original ticket box, (of glass front and sides above a small "counter", about 900 mm cross, 1300 mm deep and a shade over two metres high) was freestanding in the space. It was removed in 1978. There is, at present a "hole-in-the-wall" ticket window in the wall of the stairway. Plain wide double doors provide access to the stalls level of the auditorium. The stalls floor is timber, flat for dancing and indoor sports activities (from 1978). The portion of the dress circle cantilevered over the back stalls is supported by a deep, plated rolled steel joist (T&PH; files), spanning some 12 metres or further if the walls to the two rooms each side of the back stalls are not structural. The architects have used an unusual method of "hiding" the beam by curving the ceiling down from the rear stalls wall to the soffit of the beam, then curving up again to the edge of the circle.

The plan shape of the dress circle is typical of the work of the architects, Kaberry and Chard. In the early 1920s, their circle balustrade designs (with their straight central portions curved around each side to side boxes) were in plaster with swags of classical ornament and cartouches. From about 1927 they simplified the design to unadorned flat panelling (as at the Magnet Theatre, Lakemba demolished; Montreal, Tumut). The panels here at Junee have been decorated by persons other than the architects. The side boxes designed by the architects in their theatres finished or abutted theatrically false splayed walls in some classically-based design, as is here these comprising only one of two examples that still exist (the other being the Roxy, Leeton).

The original proscenium was a "picture frame", using diagonal strapwork as the decorative motif. In 1959 this was removed, together with the required amount of wall, to widen the opening by close on 3 metres for Cinemascope presentations. At the same time the height of the opening was lowered. This was constructed in lightweight materials. Some form of applied panelling would alleviate the "plain-ness" and better fit in with the general theme of the interior.

The walls are rough-cast plaster with classical "egg and dart" on an ovolo cornice moulding. The inside of the wall shutters are marked out in battens with a typical geometric pattern, as used since Roman times. It is the same as on the upper panes of the street doors a cross, over which are diagonals. (They are seen on grillework as painted on walls depicting theatres in Rome and Pompeii, and used by Richard C Beacham in his replicas of early Roman stages at Warwick University).

In the introduction of the Movie Theatre Heritage Register for New South Wales, 1896 1996 five stages of building development for cinema design are described. In the 1910s and early 1920s in NSW, most suburban and country cinemas had the rooftruss structure fully visible with either no ceiling or one immediately beneath the roofing material. This was the case for the early version of the Enmore Theatre, the Australian cinema at Spit Junction (demolished), and Odeon, Randwick (demolished). This was referred to as Stage Three development.

Stage Four development occurred from the late teens, up until the Great Depression. It was when some theatrical decoration was being added. The Movie Theatre Heritage Register particularly mentions the architects, Kaberry and Chard as key people in this development. They brought the ceiling down to be at the level of the lower chord of the truss, but still expressing that chord as a "beam". It was, however, almost universal not to take the lower chord to the springing point off the walls but connect it some three or four metres along the upper chord of the truss. This provided the necessary height for projection from the rear dress circle over the audience, and for an imposing proscenium. As a result, there is a sloping segment of the ceiling each side of the central flat section. It also meant that side walls could be lower than if a complete flat ceiling was designed, and of course, it was more economical, something of which Kaberry and Chard were well aware of (see K&C;, 1936). This technique, however, produced the risk of the extension of the upper chord beyond the lower chord (of the truss) deflecting and pushing the side walls out. To prevent this, these and other architects installed tension rods from the springing point up, on a more shallow rake, to be fixed some distance along the lower chord of the truss. These rods were exposed as at the Athenium Theatre. It was only after the Great Depression when a new style of decorative architecture later known as Art Deco took hold, that the whole truss, including the tension or tie rods, were covered beneath by generally, plaster ceilings. (The sloping side segments including the tie rods were now hidden by stepped plasterwork).

The other rather clever solution to the economic confines, presented by suburban and country cinema designs, was to visually express the subsidiary beams that tied the trusses together, and the system of panelling required for the lining material. This was done at the Athenaeum with all the structural and panel-framing picked out in a dark tone so the whole became a decorative geometric pattern. The horizontal section of the ceiling was divided into three segments across the width of the building. In the opposite direction the five roof trusses formed four segments, thus 12 panels were formed. In each there were nine smaller panels a large central panel of lattice-work surrounded by four small square corner panels and four elongated rectilinear side panels. Wooden lattice-work had been used for centuries in middle-eastern (Arab) countries, but appeared as a form of decoration in England in 16th-century windows and in 18th- and 19th-century furniture. It was used in ceilings of picture theatres as a means of allowing stale hot air to escape into the roof space and through roof ventilators. Unfortunately this decorative ceiling was compromised in, it is assumed, 1978, when a plain ceiling lining either covered it or replaced it. The remaining elements of the interior are the stage, dress circle and conversion of the two shops as annexes to the auditorium.

The stage is relatively small to avoid the stringent rules for fire control, yet provide enough space for live performance. The widening of the opening in 1959 permitted a screen size larger than that in many suburban, country and even capital city theatres.

The dress circle with access from the lobby on one side, possesses an emergency exit stair on the other, also against the side wall. Whereas the stalls only ever had removable seating in banks (to clear away for social functions), the circle has upholstered fixed seating with wooden arm rests as was typical for the 1930s. The capacity for this portion of the auditorium commenced at some 400 but has been reduced to somewhere between 200 and 300. The seats need re-upholstering and repair. The projection box was minimum in size when constructed, and would need to be extended sideways to provide adequate facilities for projection and lighting control for live shows.

The two shops at the side of the theatre entry have been converted into a store for chairs, mainly, and a kitchen / refreshment bar that opens into the back stalls area. The latter work and some external painting was completed in 1998 at a cost of $28,000, some of which funds was from the NSW Heritage Office.

Decoration: The architects had, at the time of construction of the theatre, great integrity in the use of classical style and its ornamentation. They were also being slightly influenced by Functionalism, but only slightly. What has been confusing to observers of the interior are two elements of Art Deco style, and embellishments to the panels on the balustrade-front of the dress circle, and on the false side-of-stage walls. It is contended that the Art Deco dado moulding and centre-piece of side false-wall panels (and as a ceiling rose in the lobby) were added after construction. Art Deco decoration did not become apparent in theatres in Australia until after the Great Depression (i.e. from 1933 onwards) yet this theatre was designed in late 1928 to early 1929, being completed in October that year.

The corner and central motifs of the dress circle panels are of an impression of trellis-work over which is a spray of vine leaves. The central motif had an inverted shell-like light fitting affixed, as seen in 1954 photographs. These photographs depict a sheen in these panels that appears metallic. Blanche Heffernan (formerly Cummins), related that the decoration was "all gold".

Peter Laurantus (in 2003) mentioned that his father, George, and mother worked hard together without employees to get the theatre up and running during the Depression (it commencing in New York only two weeks after opening the theatre). Although the Depression may have had an effect on attendance, Entertainment Tax receipts showed a decline in audiences across Australia towards the end of the 1920s. Perhaps the enthusiasm for silent films was waning. However, despite the Depression, receipts began to grow soon after sound films were introduced (1929 30, depending upon the theatre). By 1934 new cinemas were being built to cater for the growing trade. In 1935 George Laurantus and his elder brother, Nicholas, had obviously accumulated profits from their theatres, and wanted to be in this expansion, so built the Rio Theatre at Lockhart. It possessed stock Art Deco ornamentation, one of which is identical to that at the Junee theatre. Another, a strip as diaper decoration, is similar to the second Art Deco ornament at Junee the dado line. The Lockhart theatre had other painted decoration and rough-cast plaster in free swirls that appeared to be very Mediterranean, most possibly Greek in character. (The Laurantus brothers were born on the island of Kythera and came to Australia as immigrants).

The trellis and vine motifs may represent basket willow (or similar) trellises upon which grape vines were trained in the 19th and early 20th centuries in Greece. According to the Australian Greek architect, Chris Tsioulos, the vine (and these appear to be akin to Shiraz grape vine leaves) is a traditional feature of Greek life and decoration. Certainly Charles Pickett, architecture curator at the Powerhouse Museum has not so far been able to identify the motif from the Wunderlich pressed metal catalogues.

When Albert Thomas Manion purchased the theatre from Mr and Mrs P ollard in 1954 for his son, the then Mrs Manion asked about this unusual decoration and was told that it was put there by "the Greeks", meaning George Laurantus, or he and his older brother Nicholas. (From conversations with George's children it was Nicholas who called the shots until after World War II when George bought into a theatre on his own).

It is contended that the dado decoration (possibly replacing a timber dado moulding similar to that at the Montreal Theatre, Tumut), the second Art Deco motif (used as a centre-piece backing plate for lamps on the false splayed walls), the vine-leaf elements and the rough plasterwork above the dado moulding, and as backing for the vine-leaf elements, were all added around 1935. The less-rough plaster below the dado moulding is similar to that at the Tumut theatre, the material above is quite different. Judging by its covering some of the edge of the egg-and-dart cornice moulding it would appear to have been added after that moulding had been affixed (i.e. in 1929).

Peter Laurantus has told me that his father loved managing the Junee theatre. Perhaps, when attendances picked up, with the establishments of sound films, and funds became available, he wanted to put his "Greek stamp" on the theatre. In the late thirties he wanted to remain at the theatre but the elder brother, to put it in his son's word, forced George to leave and work on Nicholas' property outside of Narrandera.

The name of the theatre, albeit a corrupted spelling, also has Greek connotations being the temple of the goddess Athene, which was used for teaching. Within the original proscenium hung deep blue curtains with a large applique of overlapped letters, A and T in a highly decorative form on each of the two drapes. They also had a wide gold band a little up from the hemline. From an early photograph, a valance appears to have three crossed-hammer motifs on it. The arches in the false splayed walls had full length dark blue repp fabric curtains with bottom gold fringe and draped gold cords and tassels near the top. The present curtains are blue for the stage and nothing in the archways.

The former heritage adviser for Junee Shire Council, David Scobie, believes the present colouring of the false splayed walls and dress circle front was done at the time of the making of the film The Crossing (1990). A photo on the Theatres and Public Halls administration files, taken after it had become the JADDA Centre, shows a colour scheme of grey, white and blue (the dado moulding being blue). In The Crossing, for the dancing competition scene, the dado moulding is bright red and the walls white to off-white. The dress circle front is not shown in the film but its current finish certainly appears to have been done by a scenic artist to provide an "antique" metallic impression. The dado moulding has returned to being blue (with earlier gold showing through) but the lower portions of the walls are cream. The ceiling and upper walls appear to be as when painted c. 1978 (for the JADDA).

The integrity of the item has only been compromised by superficial alterations (such as change of windows and removal of light fixtures on the facade;; replacing side wooden shutters with windows; changing the original proscenium for a wider "plain" stage opening; and relining the ceiling). The principal parts of the building are intact, thus retaining its original theatrical aura.

== Heritage listing ==
Due to its rarity, as a building-type, the Athenium Theatre symbolises, for the State, an association with past events, persons and groups who contributed or participated in an important and cultural phenomenon of the 20th century, namely "movie going".

It symbolises the use of a cinema building as the social centre of a town with its being surrogate town hall. This and the role of the community (JADDA) organisation from 1976/7 accord the building the status of social significance for the State.

The building is a representative example of the design-work of theatre architects, Kaberry and Chard it being one of only three remaining intact across the State.

The building has as association with Greek immigrant business and benefactor, Sir Nicholas Laurantus, and through its rarity, symbolises his interests in cinema operation in the Riverina region. It also is one of the few remaining buildings in NSW that has a direct connection with Gladys Moncrief OBE, and the country touring that she and lesser Australian stage artists did in the 1920s, 30s, and 40s.

Of the 116 movie theatres operated by Greek immigrants in NSW, this one unusually possesses added decoration (presumably by George Laurantus, brother of Nicholas) in the form of a trellis and vine leaf motif. It provides a "Greek overlay" to portion of the auditorium. This exhibits significance in aesthetic terms in relation to the importance of the Greek contribution to developing cinema operation in NSW

Athenium Theatre is listed on the New South Wales State Heritage Register as of 9 January 2004 having satisfied the following criteria:

- The place is important in demonstrating the course, or pattern, of cultural or natural history in New South Wales.
- The place has a strong or special association with a person, or group of persons, of importance of cultural or natural history of New South Wales's history.
- The place is important in demonstrating aesthetic characteristics and/or a high degree of creative or technical achievement in New South Wales.
- The place has strong or special association with a particular community or cultural group in New South Wales for social, cultural or spiritual reasons.
- The place possesses uncommon, rare or endangered aspects of the cultural or natural history of New South Wales.
- The place is important in demonstrating the principal characteristics of a class of cultural or natural places/environments in New South Wales.

It is important in the course or pattern of NSW's cultural history because, like the very few remaining picture theatres of its era it is of historic, social and cultural significance due to "its association with past events, persons and groups who contributed or participated in an important social and cultural phenomenon of the 20th century, namely "movie going". The importance of such historical phase or phenomenon may be gauged. . .by its physical manifestations, including the number of theatre buildings then existing [from 1910 to 1960], the amount of employment created, the fact that "picture going" was second only to sport as a leisure time activity, and by its impact on popular taste of the time where concerned with fashion, design generally, language, music and behaviour".

The building has an association with Sir Nicholas Laurantus, Greek immigrant, businessperson and philanthropist, for this and other cinemas in the Riverina Region of NSW. The theatre generally exhibits the early 20th century efforts of Greek immigrants (with George Laurantus) to integrate into and supply entertainment facilities for the Anglo-Celtic population.

The building has an association with Gladys Moncrief, OBE, who was the most famous soprano in Australia since the retirement of Florence Austral, for the period of the 1930s to the end of the 1940s. The building symbolises those lost country theatres, in NSW, in which Moncrief appeared in major Sydney-produced productions on tour.

At a local level it has an association with the present Heffernan family through the grandfather (Ben Cummins) and great-grandfather of Senator Heffernan, for their involvement in cinema at both the Lyceum and Athenium Theatres.

The theatre building stands out and is recognisable as a theatre. This visually important element used to be a feature of many towns but the list of picture theatres in NSW towns at 1951 demonstrates that it is now rare. That is, it possesses landmark quality.

The layering of the vine and trellis decoration uniquely exhibits the influence of the management of a Greek immigrant, providing a flavour of the "peasant" population of the island of Kythera that existed at the turn of the 19th into the 20th century.

In 1929, the architects were developing towards a Functional architecture, away from the revivalist styles of the twenties and former decades. It was in the mould of that development in Sweden, but whereas Sweden continued on the road to Modernism, Australia, like USA, temporarily deviated into the style that would later be known as "Art Deco". It demonstrated what was a forward thinking process by these architects. The use of structure and construction, through simple carpentry, to provide a decorative ceiling (not now visible) also fits this assessment of Functionalism used by Kaberry and Chard.

From entertainment tax receipts, cinema attendance was greater than all other paid-for activities - sport, racing, concerts, dancing, live theatre etc., combined.

The Athenium Theatre (now Jadda Centre) possesses social significance for Junee being one of the very few, and first towns in NSW where the population came together as early as 1976/7, to buy the town's theatre for community use. Total funds were raised for purchase and rehabilitation (at that time) from the local population, through the organised community group, the Junee and District Development Association which generously vested ownership in the Local council(s).

The building provides great social significance in an historical sense to the town. Commissioner Simpson, in his Inquiry into the Regent Theatre, Sydney (1986) reported: "It is of historic, social and cultural significance because of its association with past events, persons and groups who contributed or participated in an important social and cultural phenomenon of the 20th century, namely "movie going".

It also has social significance for its other role as virtual town hall - the social centre of the town.

Collectively in Junee, the pubs (and former hotels), the three quarter century old shops and the Broadway Stores, the theatre, the railway station, the banks, the post office, the engine roundhouse, the former printery, the mansion on the hill (Monte Christo), the former flour mill, all provide a social history of a town that is unique in New South Wales.

For this assessment a table of all country theatres in NSW was revised to omit areas now incorporated into Sydney or Newcastle where comparison of Census data becomes impossible. The year 1951 was taken as being a high attendance time before television, and without new post-World War II theatres being built or old ones being closed down.

There were 351 cinema venues in 289 towns in NSW (excluding Sydney and Newcastle). A column was added to the list showing present 2003 status. Less than 10 per cent "exist" as spaces recognisable as original theatres (that is, only 31). Only 11 of those exist with some form of obviously decorative interior and theatrical exterior. The Junee theatre is one of those eleven or one of only 3.1 per cent of the body of country cinemas that existed in 1951, comprising picture theatres built in the heyday of the silent and sound movies.

Of the 57 theatre commissions identified for the work of the major theatre architectural firm of Kabbery and Chard in NSW, only three remain without being demolished, or considerably adapted. Those three are in Junee, Tumut and Leeton. Junee and Leeton possess the side-of-stage splayed false decorative walls, used as a feature by these architects. Only Tumut has an original proscenium. All three should be listed.

The picture theatre/social centre for the town is a rare example that "provides evidence of a [virtually] defunct custom, way of life". The Junee theatre is rare across the total number of towns in NSW (excluding Sydney and Newcastle). It provides accurate evidence of a significant human activity. Combined. It shows evidence of a rare significant human activity important to a community.

With its wide frontage and substantial, imposing, but modest facade, the Junee theatre is a superior building to most constructed at the time in towns of up to four thousand people, and which, in 2003, have either been altered for other uses or demolished.

The integrity of the building has only been compromised by superficial alterations (such as change of windows and removal of light fixtures on the facade; replacing side wooden shutters with windows; changing the original proscenium for a wider "plain" stage opening; and relining the ceiling). The principal parts of the building are intact, thus retaining its original theatrical aura.
