= Cinema Treasures =

Website

- Website type: Cinema
- Available in: English
- Founded: 1999
- Headquarters: Alexandria, Virginia
- Founder: Ross Melnick Patrick Crowley
- Website: Cinema Treasures
- Commercial: No
- Registration: Optional
- Launched: 2000

Cinema Treasures is a website launched in 2000 in the United States documenting theaters both extant and no longer in existence. It was created by Ross Melnick and Patrick Crowley. Melnick co-authored a book by the same name. The book explores the current use trends among former theatres, whether lesser or well known.

== See also ==
- Theatre Historical Society of America
