= David Dewhurst Medal =

Australian award for biomedical engineering

- Description: Outstanding service to biomedical engineering
- Sponsored by: Engineers Australia
- Country: Australia
- Presented by: Biomedical College, Engineers Australia
- Rewards: Framed bronze medal and certificate
- First award: 1996
- Currently held by: Bruce Morrison (2026)
- Website: www.engineersaustralia.org.au/about-us/excellence-awards-program/achievement-awards

The David Dewhurst Medal, officially the David Dewhurst Award, is presented annually by the Biomedical College of Engineers Australia to a distinguished biomedical engineer who has made significant contributions to the field. Described as Engineers Australia's top award for biomedical engineering, it was first presented in 1996 and is named after David Dewhurst, one of Australia's earliest biomedical engineers. Recipients receive a framed bronze medal and a certificate.

== History ==
David John Dewhurst AM (8 January 1919 – 4 March 1996) was a biophysicist at the University of Melbourne, where he became reader in biophysics in 1964 and remained until his retirement in 1985. He was a founder of the Society for Medical and Biological Engineering (Victoria) in 1959, the Australian Federation of Medical and Biological Engineering in 1967 and the Institution of Biomedical Engineering (Australia) in 1974, and was president of the International Federation for Medical and Biological Engineering from 1969 to 1972. He worked with Graeme Clark on the prototype multi-channel cochlear implant, and played a leading part in developing Australian electrical safety standards for medical equipment.

The award was inaugurated by the Biomedical College in 1996, the year of Dewhurst's death. According to a College account, it succeeded the Eminent Biomedical Engineers Award, which was first presented to Dewhurst himself in 1994. In 2016 Karen Reynolds became the first woman to receive the award.

== Selection ==
The award recognises outstanding service to biomedical engineering through one or more of: a highly significant contribution through technical innovation; longstanding eminence in the science or practice of biomedical engineering; exceptional and sustained management or leadership; or a notable combination of these. Under the College's rules, nominees did not need to be members of Engineers Australia, and serving members of the College Board were not eligible. The award is now one of the achievement awards in the Engineers Australia Excellence Awards program, which accept self-nominations; the Biomedical College judges nominations nationally and selects one recipient each year.

== Recipients ==
David Dewhurst Medal recipients
Year	Recipient	Affiliation	Ref.
1996	Keith Daniel	Nucleus Ltd	
1997	Peter C. Farrell	ResMed	
1998	George Kossoff	CSIRO	
1999	Richard Kirsner	La Trobe University	
2000	Klaus Schindhelm	University of New South Wales	
2001	Alex Watson	Premier Biomedical Engineering Pty Ltd	
2002	Barry Seeger		
2003	Laurie Knuckey		
2004	Mark Pearcy		
2005	John Southwell		
2006	John Symonds		
2007	Geoffrey Wickham	Telectronics	
2009	Andrew Downing	Flinders University	
2010	Alexander McLean		
2011	Graham Grant		
2012	David Burton	Compumedics	
2013	Nigel Lovell	University of New South Wales	
2014	James F. Patrick	Cochlear Limited	
2015	Derek Abbott	University of Adelaide	
2016	Karen Reynolds	Flinders University	
2017	W. John Russell	University of Adelaide	
2018	Christopher Bertram	University of Sydney	
2019	Alan Finkel	Office of the Chief Scientist	
2020	Michael Griffiths		
2021	Leo Barnes	Retired; formerly TÜV SÜD	
2022	Edward Scull	Royal Perth Hospital (retired)	
2024	Lloyd Walker		
2025	Michael Flood	Consultant	
2026	Bruce Morrison		

== See also ==
- List of engineering awards
