= Noel Desmond Gray =

Noel Desmond Gray (26 December 1920 – November 1999) was a senior design engineer at the Philips subsidiary Kriesler and medical student at the University of Sydney after War service in the Royal Australian Electrical and Mechanical Engineers. He formed the desire to start the Medical Device Industry at Med School and co-founded Telectronics Pty Ltd.

== Early life ==
Noel Gray was born to Hilda Alice Gray on Boxing Day 1920 in Crookwell, New South Wales, Australia. Separated from his father Jo Gray, Hilda took him to grow up with her father at Middle View near Dalgety on the Snowy River. His grandfather brought him up. George Hedger was son of a man that newspaper reports said was the original inspiration for the Banjo Paterson poem "The Man from Snowy River".

Noel and Hilda moved to Sydney and he attended a number of technical schools and at the Sydney Technical School passed the Intermediate Certificate. He then went to work in the radio industry culminating in a position at Kriesler as a technician before the War.

== World War II ==
Gray enlisted in the army in August 1942. During World War II he was trained at the Army School of Radio Physics, whereupon he became a radar technician and Senior Radar Artificer. He also attended No. 6 OCTU.

Gray returned to LHQ where he was placed in charge of the Drawing Office and maintenance section. He helped to install the radar defenses on Rottnest Island for Western Australia and was the Senior Radar Artificer at Exmouth Gulf. He worked on the first US-designed radar unit in Australia, which was subsequently used to direct bombers during the Battle of the Coral Sea.

Gray was discharged from the army on 10 May 1946 with the rank of Staff Sergeant posted to 2 SPECIAL RADAR DET RAA.

== Post war ==
In 1948 Gray was accepted to study medicine at the University of Sydney but withdrew from his studies in 1950 to get married. He work for the Department of Civil Aviation on RADAR installation at Sydney Airport, and on engineering projects for the Metropolitan Water, Sewerage & Drainage Board.

In 1952 he returned to work for the Philips' subsidiary Kreisler to work on a secret project for LRWE, then as senior design engineer. He designed and developed printed circuit board production methods that he incorporated into his designed Kriesler Duplex radios, but were not adopted until a later date. A number of patents were taken out on his work and he was sent on a World study tour by Phillips where he introduced his printed circuits to their founder.

Gray resigned from Kreisler in 1959 to start a medical electronics business, an ambition he had developed while studying medicine from 1948 to 1950. To finance this venture he started a specialist TV repair business and was a founder of ESA (later called TESA).

Noel incorporated Television Electronic Services, a sole trader into Telectronics Pty Limitedin Sydney, Australia, in 1963 The engineer Noel Gray invited Geoffrey Wickham to join and the unqualified man initially worked under Noel's supervision and guidance to manufacture industrial products. Noel gradually educated Geoff in medical electronics and introduced implantable cardiac pacemakers in 1963. The corporate name was derived from "Television and Electronic Services", operated by Noel Gray as a sole trader from 1959 to 1964. The company made significant contributions to pacemaker technology including the first definition of the relationship between surface area of the heart electrodes & pacing pulse characteristics, the first use of integrated circuits and the first hermetic titanium encapsulation.

Nucleus Holdings Pty Limited, a company incorporated in 1967, became a 50% shareholder of Telectronics in January 1968. In 1975 Nucleus Holdings Pty Limited transferred its shares in Telectronics to Nucleus Corporation Pty Limited and reduced the holding by sale of shares to a French multinational leaving a 33.33% holding by Nucleus Corporation Pty Ltd which became the publicly listed company Nucleus Limited 1980. In turn Nucleus Limited was acquired by Pacific Dunlop in 1988. Legal action over the sale of faulty "J Lead" electrodes, inherited by Telectronics in acquisition of pacemaker manufacturer Cordis corporation of Miami led to the company having to settle extensive worldwide compensation claims. This led to the sale of Telectronics assets to, eventually, St. Jude Medical of Minneapolis and Pacific Dunlop restructuring itself into Ansell.

== Death ==
Noel Desmond Gray died in November 1999. He was survived by his wife Beth, daughter Robyn, and son Christopher.
