= Telectronics =

Australian company best known for its role in developing the pacemaker

Telectronics Pty Ltd was an Australian company best known for its role in developing the pacemaker. It was located in Lane Cove, Sydney. In 1988 the business was acquired by Pacific Dunlop. However, legal claims resulting from the sale of faulty pacemaker electrode leads inherited by the company in acquisition of Cordis Corporation of Miami led to eventual sale of the assets of the company and Pacific Dunlop restructuring itself into Ansell.

== Development of the pacemaker ==
Noel Gray incorporated Telectronics in Sydney, Australia, in 1963 the engineer Noel Gray invited Geoffrey Wickham to join and under Noel's supervision and guidance he initially designed some simple industrial products and introduced Geoff, an unqualified man, to medical electronics and implantable cardiac pacemakers in 1963. The corporate name was derived from "Television and Electronic Services", operated by Gray as a sole trader from 1959 to 1964.

The company made significant contributions to pacemaker technology including the first definition of the relationship between surface area of the heart electrodes and pacing pulse characteristics, the first use of integrated circuits and the first hermetic titanium encapsulation.

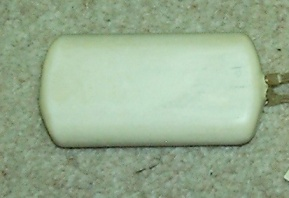
Telectronics first pacemaker model P1, 1964

The company's first model, designated P1, was implanted in three volunteer terminally ill patients in December 1964 - January 1965, while 2 control samples were retained in a 37 °C. saline bath. This initial design used PNP - NPN electronics to deliver a 2 millisecond pulse to the Jeffcoat epicardial electrodes, and was powered by 4 Mallory mercuric oxide zinc cells (mercury battery), all encapsulated in epoxy resin with a final dip coat of a mix of epoxy and titanium dioxide. All 3 implants failed in ability to maintain capture of the heart after periods of up to 35 weeks. These failures were later proven to be due to the excessively large surface area of the electrodes.

The initial clinical experience led to further animal research using mongrel dogs at the laboratories of the University of Sydney medical school and at the Royal North Shore Hospital's Wellcome laboratory. In this research measurements were made of electrode impedance and pacing threshold energy over a range of pulse voltages and pulse widths, using intramyocardial electrodes of 10, 20 and 50 square millimetres surface area. The chronic measurements allowed plotting of the relationship between electrode surface area and pulse voltage/width, leading to a conclusion that an electrode area between 10 and 30 mm^{2} was optimum in terms of energy needed when combined with a pulse width of only 0.5 milliseconds.

These characteristics were incorporated in the next design to be implanted in humans, the model P4, which employed 30 mm^{2} area intramyocardial electrodes (and later transvenous pacing electrodes), a very conservative 7.5 volt pulse and for further conservatism a magnetically operated switch which could be actuated from outside the body to change the pulse width from 0.5 to 1.0 millisecond.
The 0.5 millisecond pulse width became the standard for later Telectronics models and became the approximate standard for all pacemaker manufacturers by the late 70's, until the evolution of externally programmable/monitorable pacemakers using digital electronics in the late 1980s.

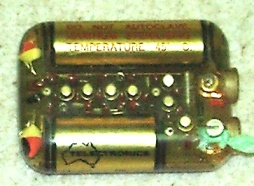
'Demand' (VVI) model P6 1967. Epoxy encapsulation, 7 transistors, mercury battery

Research also included dissection and analysis of the failure modes of explanted pacemakers of any manufacturer. Most failures were due to an internal short circuit of one of the cells of the multicell battery due to the growth of metal dendrites; or the result of water vapour diffusing though the epoxy resin encapsulation. The only suitable cell available at the time was the mercuric oxide-zinc cell, so the battery problems remained. In 1967 Telectronics commenced research into the technologies which could allow hermetic sealing of the pacemaker to preclude water vapour penetration and, as an interim measure contracted AWM, a subsidiary of AWA, to develop integrated circuits for the electronics. These early integrated circuits were developed by David R. Money who later joined Telectronics and later still led development of the cochlear implant for the profoundly deaf. The circuits were analogue type, housed in hermetically sealed ceramic military 'flat packs' with redundant double gold bonding of the terminations. The IC's were first used in the model P7 of 1969.

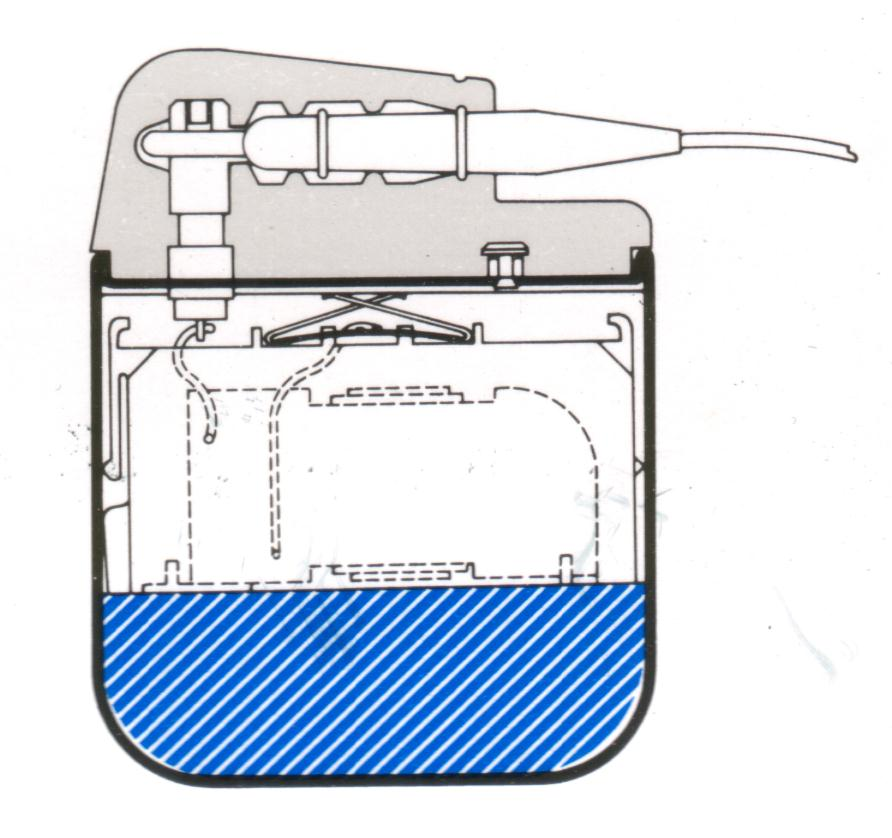
Model 160 (VVI) 1976 the first 'Slimline' titanium cased model. Blue is lithium-iodide cell, above that the electronics, above that hermetic cap/terminal & electrode lead

The first hermetically sealed models were the P8-9-10 of 1971 using titanium encapsulation with ceramic terminal insulation, developed by David J Cowdery. Bonding of the ceramic was performed using vacuum brazing and an alloy of titanium/nickel with a small percentage of copper. The final hermetic sealing of the titanium capsule was performed by a TIG argon welding process within a large bell jar on an automated analogue controlled machine designed and built by Cowdery. These were the first pacemakers using the conventional battery to be hermetically sealed. Gas products of the battery were absorbed by a chemical 'getter'. Some examples of these models survived to beyond 5 years. By the late 80's TIG welding was replaced by laser welding.

In 1971 Telectronics commenced testing samples of a new type of energy source for pacemakers, the lithium cell (lithium battery) being developed by Wilson Greatbatch and in 1972 commenced development of a range of integrated circuits capable of operation from the 2.8 volts of the cell while providing a stimulating pulse of 4.5 volts. The combined technologies of a lithium cell, integrated circuits, hermetic titanium casing and an 0.5 millisecond pulse was first used clinically in 1974 in the model 120 pacemaker which was state of the art for that time. In 1981 a study of 28,669 Telectronics lithium powered implants showed a cumulative survival of 99.88% and a mean time to failure (MTTF) of 12,260 months. The longest surviving model 120 was electively explanted in 1993 after 17 years of operation.

Control of Telectronics was gained in 1967 by Nucleus Holdings. Telectronics Inc. was incorporated in the US in 1974, and in 1977 commenced US manufacture from the former General Electric facility in Milwaukee, later relocating to Denver. A manufacturing plant was also established at Châtellerault France, in 1978.

== Pacific Dunlop ==
In 1988 Nucleus was acquired by Pacific Dunlop. At that time Nucleus Limited contained offshoots such as Telectronics, Medtel, Ausonics, Domedica and Cochlear. Cochlear Limited which developed the cochlear implant was floated on the Australian stock market. Pacific Dunlop was hoping to diversify away from so-called rustbelt companies. At the time of acquisition, Telectronics was number 2 in the worldwide pacemaker market.

In January 1995, Telectronics was forced to recall thousands of model 801 atrial "J" leads by the Food and Drug Administration leading to the company having to eventually settle legal claims at a cost of hundreds of millions of dollars. The cause of the recall was a "J lead" electrode, utilizing a rigid stylet within the helix of the electrode lead, inherited by the company in acquisition of pacemaker lead manufacturer Cordis Corporation of Miami. The inherent dangers arising from incorporation of a rigid stylet had been demonstrated by Telectronics, Sydney, in 1967. In 1996 Pacific Dunlop sold most of the assets of Telectronics to St Jude Medical of Minnesota and Telectronics Pty Limited is now a shelf company TPLC Pty. Ltd. Pacific Dunlop restructured in 2001 becoming Ansell with the high cost of the Telectronics settlement being a contributing factor in the decision.
