= Geoffrey Wickham =

Geoffrey Gordon Wickham AO (28 October 1933 – 23 April 2024) was an Australian medical instrument engineer. He was one of the pioneers of cardiac pacemaking.

Wickham was born in 1933 in Camperdown, Victoria, Australia to dairy farmer parents. In 1963 he co-founded the medical instruments company Telectronics Pty Ltd in Sydney, and served as the company's Chief Engineer from 1963 to 1970 and Technical Director from 1963 to 1978. He was elected an Honorary Life Governor of Royal Prince Alfred Hospital, Sydney in 1982, and was appointed Officer of the Order of Australia in June 2000 "for service to the design of medical equipment, particularly in the development of the implantable cardiac pacemaker".

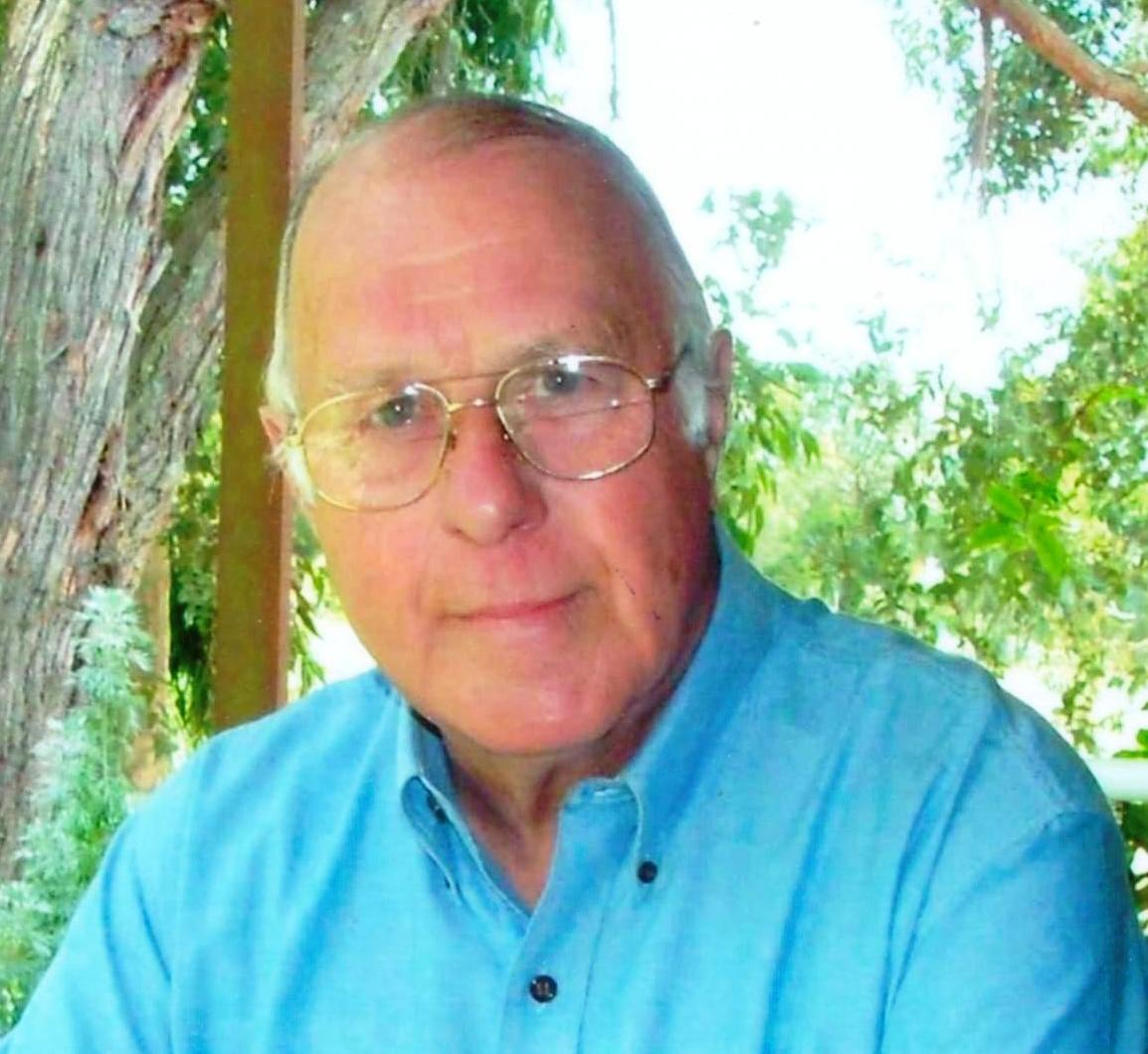
Wickham in 2004

Wickham had no formal engineering training, finishing High School at Year 8 to commence work as a radio and electrical repairman. At age 21 he passed the Year 12 examinations by night study at the South Australian School of Mines and Industries, while working as a technician at the Department of Supply, Long Range Weapons Establishment in South Australia, and being appointed the same year on merit as an electrical engineer at graduate level by T.C.A. Pty Ltd, a subsidiary of the Dutch company Philips. In 1958-59 he studied the application of the new technology of the transistor at Philips' establishments in the Netherlands and England; being relocated after that to Philips' Sydney office.

In 1964, after being co-founder of Telectronics Pty Ltd in 1963, the company was invited to participate in artificial cardiac pacemaker research in which Wickham as head of research and development and co-founder and initial financier Noel Gray made significant contributions. His involvement as a director of Telectronics ceased in about 1982 when control of the company was gained by Nucleus Limited.

Subsequently, while continuing involvement in bio-engineering (particularly in paediatrics), he studied aerodynamics and structural engineering, which led to construction of a fuel efficient light aircraft which was awarded the Sport Aircraft Association of Australia's Henry Millicer Innovation Award for Best Australian Technical Innovation or Design in 1998. In 2007, he was the recipient of Engineers Australia's David Dewhurst Medal "In recognition of his outstanding contribution to the profession of Biomedical Engineering".

At age 77, he was the lead co-researcher of a team at Sydney's The Children's Hospital at Westmead developing and clinically trialling a new form of therapy for a childhood condition, funded by a AUS$330,000 grant by the National Health and Medical Research Council.

He was a father of four and has 11 grandchildren.
