= Nucleus Limited =

Private company in Sydney, Australia

- Type: Public
- Industry: Biotechnology, Medical devices
- Founded: 1965
- Founder: Paul Trainor
- Headquarters: Sydney, Australia
- Key people: Paul Trainor (Managing Director)
- Products: Pacemakers, Cochlear implants, Ultrasound imaging, Cardiac monitors
- Parent: Pacific Dunlop (acquired 1988)

Nucleus Limited began as a private company in Sydney, Australia, in 1965. It was founded by former Watson-Victor executive Paul Murray Trainor, after acquisition of X-ray sales & service company Scientific & General.

Other companies to be controlled by Nucleus and developed by Trainor were pacemaker pioneers Telectronics, cardiac monitor/ defibrillator manufacturer Medtel which was previously the instrument division of Telectronics, Ausonics a specialist in ultrasound imaging, medical instrument importer Domedica, and Cochlear which developed the multichannel 'bionic ear' cochlear implant pioneered by Dr Graeme Clark AC.

In 1982 Nucleus, by then a multinational company, was floated on the Australian Securities Exchange as Nucleus with the Trainor family holding 50% of the issued stock. Control of Nucleus was gained by Pacific Dunlop in 1988.

Nucleus and Trainor are generally accorded recognition as the founders of bioengineering as an industry in Australia. Paul Murray Trainor, born 1927 died in 2006. His contribution to Australian industry was recognised by his appointment as an Officer of The Order Of Australia on Australia Day 1986, "For Service to Secondary Industry, particularly in the Field of Medical Technology", and, as further recognition the establishment in March 2006 by the University of New South Wales of the "Paul M Trainor Chair", a memorial Professorship in the Graduate School of Biomedical Engineering.
