= Lars Kolind =

Danish businessman

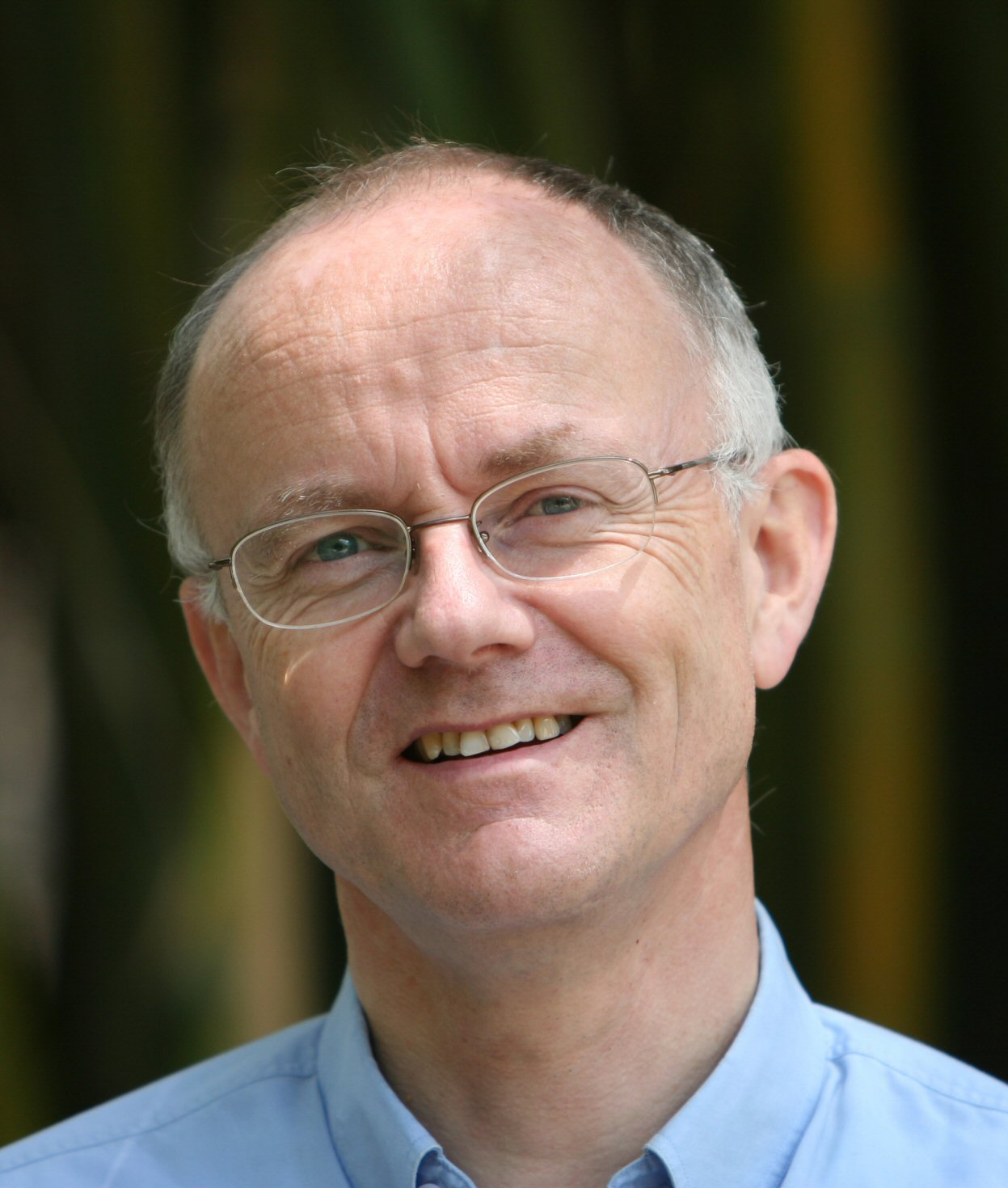

Personal details
- Born: 5 May 1947 (age 78)
- Education: Cand.scient.
- Alma mater: Aarhus University
- Website: www.kolindkuren.dk larskolind.dk

Lars Kolind (born 5 May 1947) is a Danish businessman. Kolind holds an M.Sc. in Mathematics from Aarhus University from 1972 and a B.Comm. from the Copenhagen Business School from 1977. He is adjunct professor of leadership and strategy at Aarhus University Business School (Aarhus School of Business) since 2000. He serves as Detao Master of Leadership and Strategy since 2012.

== Career ==
Kolind was executive vice president of Risø National Laboratory from 1981 to 1984 and chief operating officer of Radiometer (company) from 1984 to 1988. Kolind served as CEO of Demant A/S (1988–98), which owns hearing aid manufacturer Oticon. He introduced a non-hierarchical organization (the Spaghetti Organization) in 1991 and took the company public on Nasdaq Copenhagen in 1995. Kolind and the Spaghetti organization were featured by Tom Peters in several books including Liberation management in 1992. Kolind’s transformation of Oticon has been subject of management cases from IMD.

Kolind carried through a financial turnaround of Oticon 1988–90, and in 1991 Kolind changed the company by designing and implementing the so-called "Spaghetti Organization", which has been featured as one of the first knowledge-based, almost paperless organisations in the world. Kolind left William Demant Holding in 1998. Kolind's work in Oticon has been featured in articles and books including Tom Peters' Liberation Management and Per Thygesen Poulsen's Think the Unthinkable (in Danish: Tænk det Utænkelige), both in 1993. Upon Kolind's departure from Oticon, professor Mette Morsing from the Copenhagen Business School co-edited the book Managing the Unmanagable for a Decade (with Kristian Eiberg) in 1998, which also discusses Kolind's works.

Since 1998 Kolind has served as non-executive board member of K. J. Jacobs AG, Grundfos, Poul Due Jensens Fond, Unimerco Group, Zealand Pharma, LinKS and Wemind. In 2000 he started PreVenture A/S, a venture capital firm, which was managed by BankInvest. PreVenture owned Retail Internet A/S, Yellowtel A/S, Isabella Smith A/S and KeepFocus A/S and was dissolved in 2009. Today, Kolind is majority shareholder in KeepFocus A/S through his personal holding company Kolind A/S. Other investments are Spiir, Impero A/S, and Bookanaut Aps. The Kolind family owned the Løndal and Addithus Estates in Western Denmark 1996-2017 and has owned the Sømer Skov Forest Estate on the island of Sjælland since 2011. Kolind is chairman of the supervisory board of Kristeligt Dagblad A/S and a member of the advisory board of Danske Bank. Kolind is also chairman of the board of Jacob Jensen Holding ApS, and LinKS.

Kolind co-founded Impero A/S, a global compliance platform, in 2012, and took the company public on Nasdaq First North Copenhagen in 2021.

In 2011 Lars Kolind became Chairman of Jacob Jensen Design, and in 2018 became a majority shareholder. Jacob Jensen Design has since been experiencing financial losses. In 2020, Salling Bank and Vækstfonden intervened to help prevent the company from going bankrupt.

== Books ==
In 2000 Kolind published the book, The Knowledge Society—Agenda for Denmark in the 21st Century (Vidensamfundet—Dagsorden for Danmark I det 21. Århundrede, in Danish). In 2006, Kolind wrote The Second Cycle–Winning the War against Bureaucracy.

Kolind also co-authored the book, Unboss: Leadership For Today and For The Future, (with Jacob Bøtter). He also a contributor to the book, The Future of Innovation—where over 350 academic, political and business thinkers contributed.

== Politics ==
On 7 May 2007 Kolind announced that he had supported the newly formed party, Liberal Alliance with a donation of DKK 100.000 hoping that he could help establish a new political agenda for Denmark in relation to the increased competition from low-wage countries, the environmental challenge and the future for Danish culture.

At the November 2007 parliamentary election, Kolind ran for Liberal Alliance in the Fyn region. Kolind was not elected, but he continued to actively support the party, currently chairing the Liberal Alliance Business Club since 2018.

== Awards and other activities ==
Kolind served as associate professor of economics and planning theory at the Copenhagen University from 1977 to 1982. In 1993 he received the national IT-Prize (IT-prisen) and in 1996 the National Management Prize. The same year Kolind was awarded the title "Man of the Year" and in 1998 "Social Entrepreneur of the Year" (Årets Ildsjæl).

In 1998, Kolind co-founded The National Competency Council (Det nationale kompetenceråd or Kompetencerådet) where he led the establishment of The Danish National Competency Accounts 1999. Together with Minister for Social Affairs Karen Jespersen, Kolind founded The National Network for Social Cohesion in 1996 and The Copenhagen Centre for Social Cohesion in 1998. In 2000 Kolind co-founded The National Council for Children and Culture. In 2017 Kolind co-founded and chaired the Danish National Advisory Board for Food, Meals and Health.

Kolind has been chairman of the board of the World Scout Foundation 2010-12 and 2017–19, and member of the World Scout Committee 2009-18.

In 2017, Kolind co-founded the World Guide Foundation under the patronage by Her Royal Highness Princess Benedikte of Denmark.

Kolind has received the highest international award of the World Organization of the Scout Movement, the Bronze Wolf Award, the Swedish Gustav Adolf Award, and the Boy Scouts of America Silver World Award and Kolind is a member of the Regal Circle of the Baden-Powell World Fellowship. Kolind is a knight 1st class of the order of the Dannebrog and member of the Danish Academy for the Technical Sciences.

== Controversies ==
In 2012, Lars Kolind exited his post as Chairman of the Board at Grundfos after power struggle problems with Niels Due Jensen. This controversy became the subject of a book written by Birgitte Erhardtsen. Kolind said he had been affected by the negative publicity against him that the book had generated.

In 2016, Keepfocus was sold to the German Noventic Group, where Kolind (the main owner of Keepfocus at the time of its sale) had to write off DKK 51 million.

In 2020, Kolind said he had lost over DKK 20 million as a major shareholder in the IT company Conferize. The company announced it would close down in the same year.

== External sources ==
- Kolind Kuren (http://kolindkuren.dk/)
- Dagbladet Information: Storbytosserne (http://www.information.dk/149264/)
