= Karen Reynolds =

Australian biomedical engineer and researcher

Karen Reynolds FTSE FAHMS

Personal details
- Occupation: Biomedical engineer

Karen Reynolds is an Australian biomedical engineer. She is currently the Deputy Dean of Computer Science, Engineering and Mathematics at Flinders University and a Matthew Flinders Distinguished Professor. Reynolds is the director of the Medical Device Research Institute and founding director of the Medical Device Partnering Program in South Australia, an organisation that facilitates collaboration between researchers, end-users and industry.

== Honours and awards ==
- David Dewhurst Medal, 2016
- Fellow of the Australian Academy of Health & Medical Sciences, 2014
- Medical Technology Association of Australia Outstanding Achievement Award, 2014
- South Australian Scientist of the Year, 2012
- Named in Top 100 Most Influential Engineers in Australia, 2012, 2013 & 2015
- Fellow of the Australian Academy of Technological Sciences & Engineering, 2011
- Australian Professional Engineer of the Year, 2010
- Australian Learning & Teaching Council Citation, 2011

== Boards and committees ==
Her expertise has been called upon in a number of scientific boards and committees providing medical and scientific advice to organisations, institutes and governments.

- Member, The Advisory Committee on Medical Devices, Therapeutic Good Administration
- Member, Australian Medical Research Advisory Board
- Past Chair, Biomedical Engineering College, Engineers Australia
- Chair, National Panel for Biomedical Engineering Education and Research, Engineers Australia
- Director, Academy of Technological Sciences & Engineering Board
- Chair, Health and Technology Forum, Academy of Technological Sciences & Engineering
- Member, South Australian Science Council
- Member, Advisory Committee on Medical Devices, Therapeutic Goods Administration
- Member, South Australian Selection Panel for The General Sir John Monash Awards
