= Bernafon =

- Company type: Aktiengesellschaft
- Industry: Medical devices
- Founded: 1946
- Headquarters: Bern, Switzerland
- Area served: Worldwide in over 70 countries
- Key people: Søren Nielsen, CEO; Erich Spahr, Managing Director
- Products: Hearing aids
- Number of employees: over 500 worldwide (2018)
- Parent: Demant A/S
- Website: bernafon.com

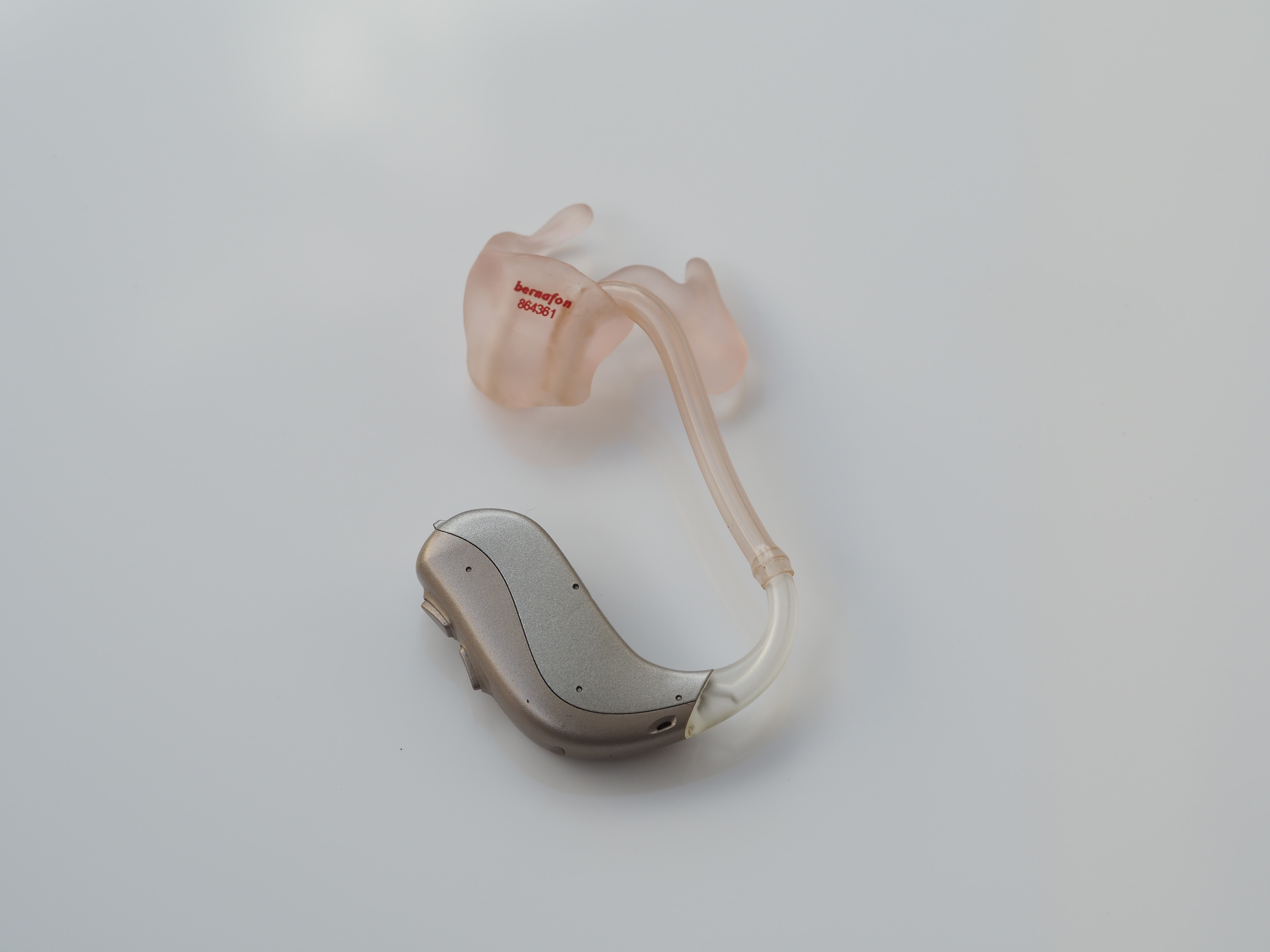
Hearing aid Bernafon Zerena ZR5

Bernafon is a globally operating company that defines and markets hearing aids and hearing aid accessories, including fitting software and consumer apps. Headquartered in Bern, Switzerland, the company employs some 500 people worldwide and operates in over 70 countries.

In its history, Bernafon has achieved many industry milestones and successes, including the world's first digitally programmable hearing instrument, an ChannelFree™ signal processing. In 2017, the new DECS™ technology platform was introduced.

== History ==
The story of Bernafon began in 1946, at what was then Gfeller AG, a telephone and telephone system company outside Bern, Switzerland. There were two main reasons for the compoany to enter the hearing instrument business. Shortly after the end of Second World War, management wanted to expand the range of its products, and the head of the company, Hans Gfeller, was himself severely hearing-impaired.

As a result, Hans Gfleller's son and one of his fellow students started building their own hearing instruments. The first model, completed in 1946, saw the device and its battery housed in two separate leather cases. It was therefore given the name A1 2-Pack. The device was soon in demand, and hearing instruments rapidly became an integral part of Gfeller's product range.

== Merger ==
In 1987, Gfeller AG merged with Autophon, Hasler and Zellweger Telecommunications to form the Ascom group. This group employed a total of 14,000 workers and was ranked eleventh among the world's telecommunication firms.

A further expansion took place in 1992 with the takeover of the hearing instrument activities of the German firm Robert Bosch GmbH. The integration of Bosch's hearing instrument activities and the simultaneous creation of a production line in Australia proved too great a challenge for the relatively small company.

The 1995 takeover of Bernafon by William Demant resulted in the opening of new sales companies and expansion of the product offering.

In 2016, Bernafon celebrated its 70th anniversary in the hearing aid industry.

== Products ==
- 1946: A1 2-Pack, first portable hearing instrument
- 1958: G-Series, pocket hearing instrument with transistor
- 1963: H-Series, first behind-the-ear instrument
- 1986: Charisma, first in-the-ear instrument
- 1988: PHOX, world's first digital programmable hearing system
- 1992: Audioflex, hearing instrument with remote control
- 1999: Smile, first fully digital hearing instrument
- 2002: Symbio, world's first ChannellFree™ hearing instrument
- 2007: Brite, award-winning design with external speaker
- 2012: Chronos Nano, receiver-in-the-ear instrument with Adaptive Feedback Canceller Plus
- 2017: Zerena, first made for iPhone® hearing instrument with DECS™ technology
- 2019: Viron, first Li-ion rechargeable hearing aid
- 2019: Leox, first True Environment Processing™ Super Power | Ultra Power hearing aid
- 2020: Alpha, first rechargeable hearing aid with Hybrid Technology™
