= Oticon =

Danish hearing aid manufacturer

Oticon A/S
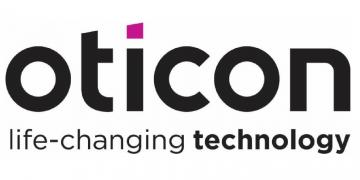
- Type: Subsidiary (A/S)
- Industry: Medical devices
- Founded: 1904; 122 years ago
- Founder: Hans Demant
- Headquarters: Smørum, Egedal, Denmark
- Products: Hearing aids
- Number of employees: 3,000+
- Parent: Demant A/S
- Website: oticon.global

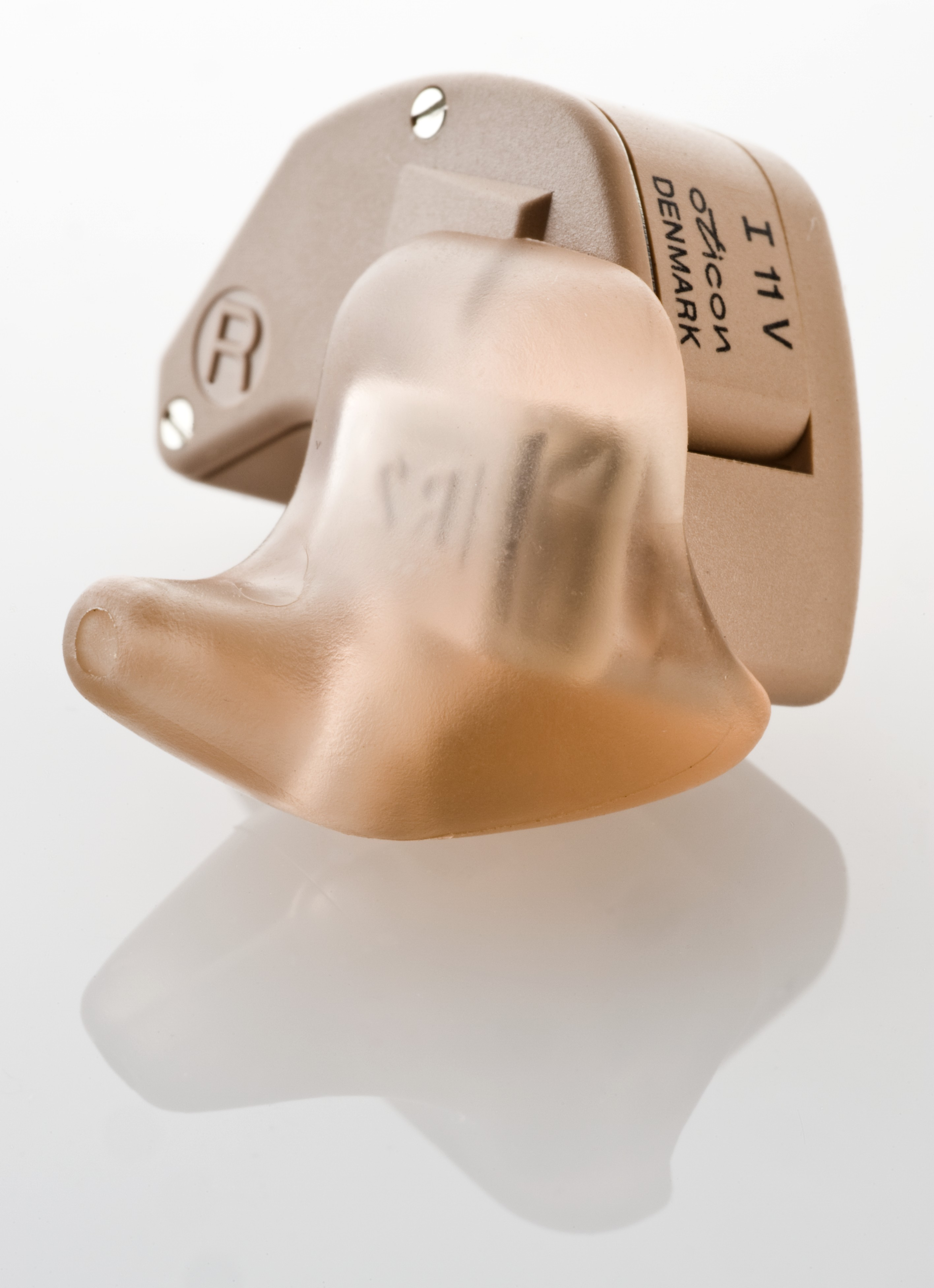
Oticon hearing aid

Oticon is a Danish hearing aid manufacturer based near Copenhagen in Denmark. The company is a subsidiary of Demant A/S. It was founded in 1904 by Hans Demant, whose wife was hearing impaired.

Oticon has branches in several countries, including a production plant in Poland, with more than 3,000 employees worldwide. The company claims to be the world's second-largest manufacturer of hearing aids, and it uses a management style known as "spaghetti organization", which was introduced by Lars Kolind under his leadership between 1988 and 1998.

In 2018 Oticon was fined AUD$2.5 million and they were forced to apologise for misleading customers in Australia about hearing aids and their technology.

== Oticon Medical ==
Oticon Medical is a sister company of Oticon, both being subsidiaries of the Demant Group. Whereas Oticon specialises in hearing aids, Oticon Medical specialises in hearing implants and released its first products in 2009. The company's Ponto bone conduction implant is now in its fifth generation.

In 2013, Oticon Medical acquired Neurelec, a French producer of cochlear implants.

In April 2022, Demant announced it had agreed to sell Oticon Medical to Australian company Cochlear Limited for DKK850 million and would exit the hearing implant business.
