= Bionics Institute =

The Bionics Institute
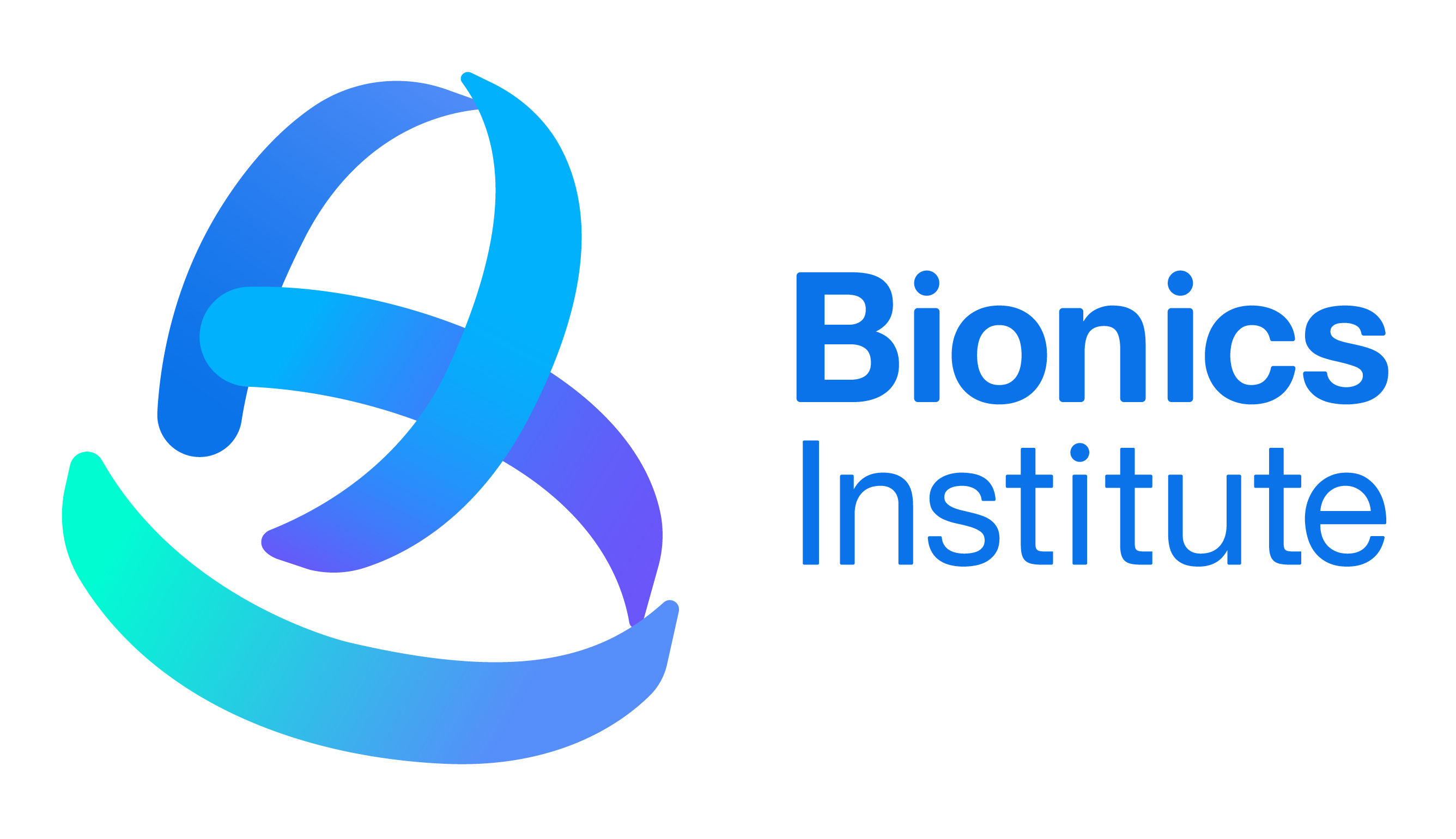
- The Bionics Institute logo
- Motto: Innovation for Life
- Founder: Professor Graeme Clark
- Established: 1986; 40 years ago
- Mission: Medical translational research
- Focus: Medical bionics
- Chair: John Stanhope AM
- CEO: Robert Klupacs
- Faculty: University of Melbourne; University of New South Wales; La Trobe University; University of Wollongong; St Vincent's Hospital, Melbourne; Royal Victorian Eye and Ear Hospital
- Adjunct faculty: Centre for Eye Research Australia; National ICT Australia; CSIRO; ARC Centre of Excellence for Electromaterials Science; Bionic Vision Australia; HEARing CRC
- Staff: approx. 100
- Budget: A$10.8 million (2019)
- Formerly called: Bionic Ear Institute
- Location: 384-388 Albert Street, East Melbourne, Victoria, Australia
- Coordinates: 37°48′34″S 144°58′41″E
- Interactive map of The Bionics Institute
- Website: bionicsinstitute.org

The Bionics Institute is an Australian medical research institute focusing on medical device development. It is located in Melbourne, Australia.

== History ==
The Bionics Institute was founded in 1986 by Professor Graeme Clark AC. Professor Clark is widely recognised for his role in the development of the cochlear implant, a device that can restore hearing to deaf individuals. From 2005 to 2017, the Bionics Institute was under the leadership of Professor Rob Shepherd AM. During his tenure, the institute's research focus expanded to include a variety of clinical areas, such as neurological conditions, blindness, and inflammatory bowel disease.

In 2017, Robert Klupacs was appointed as the institute's CEO. Under his leadership, the scope of the institute's research was broadened to encompass auto-immune, chronic, brain, hearing, and vision disorders. Additionally, Klupacs emphasised the importance of commercialising the institute's research, facilitating the creation of several spin-off companies.

The institute's primary mission is to advance medical technologies through research and the development of medical devices, to transform the lives of individuals with disabilities and solve medical challenges.

== Location ==
The Bionics Institute has two campuses, one located in East Melbourne and the other in nearby Fitzroy. Mollison House (East Melbourne) is the site of the institute's administrative team as well as the bulk of its human research. The second campus exists in the Daly Wing of St Vincent's Hospital, Melbourne which houses the institute's wet labs and device fabrication facilities.

== Research ==
The Bionics Institute's research is focusses their research into three areas of study: auto-immune and chronic conditions; brain conditions; hearing impairment and vision loss.

=== Auto-immune and chronic conditions ===
The application of electricity for the purpose of modifying nerve function has emerged as a fundamental method for treating various auto-immune and chronic ailments that have limited responsiveness to traditional pharmaceutical treatments. Such conditions include Crohn's disease, rheumatoid arthritis, type 2 diabetes and incontinence.

=== Brain conditions ===
Various devices have been developed with the purpose of enhancing outcomes for individuals with neurological conditions, such as Alzheimer's disease, Parkinson's disease and stroke. Additionally, the Institute develops neural prosthetics, which aims to improve bodily functions and brain function through the use of implanted devices.

=== Hearing impairment and vision loss ===
Hearing impairment research at the Bionics Institute is a field of study dedicated to addressing various forms of hearing loss and developing solutions to improve auditory function. The Institute focuses on advancing medical technology and addressing the needs of individuals with hearing impairments. One key area of research at the Bionics Institute is the development of a medical device geared towards optimising language development in hearing-impaired infants. According to one 2006 study, the device aims to provide necessary auditory stimulation for language acquisition has resulted in improved speech and language skills. Another area of study involves the use of light to enhance the selectivity of auditory nerve stimulation, particularly in the context of cochlear implants and other neural stimulation devices; Additionally, the institute has developed objective tests for tinnitus.

== Funding ==
The Bionics Institute is funded through a combination of government funding, private donations, and contract research. In 2019, the institute's annual expenditure was $10.8 million. In 2019, 26.5% income was from Government Grants and 18.6% income was from donations and bequests.

== Commercialistion ==
Professor Graeme Clark, the founder of the Bionics Institute, played a prominent role in the development of Australia's cochlear implant, which was later commercialised by Cochlear Pty Ltd.

Building upon this success, the Bionics Institute has also produced several spin-off companies including Epi-Minder, which focuses on the commercialisation of an epilepsy seizure monitoring device; DBS Tech which specialised in adaptive deep brain stimulation systems for Parkinson's disease; and Neo-Bionica (launched 2021), a company dedicated to the design and manufacturing of specialised medical devices and implants for human clinical trials.

== Collaborations ==
=== The University of Melbourne, Medical Bionics Department ===
In July 2012, the School of Medicine and Dentistry at the University of Melbourne established the Medical Bionics Department in collaboration with the Bionics Institute.

The Medical Bionics department launched its inaugural PhD program in 2013. Professor James Fallon serves as the head of the Medical Bionics Department at the University of Melbourne.

== See also ==
- Health in Australia
