= Pacific Dunlop =

Australian conglomerate company

Pacific Dunlop Limited
- Type: Conglomerate
- Industry: Automotive, textile, electronics, biotechnology
- Founded: 1899
- Defunct: 2002; 24 years ago
- Fate: Defunct company, assets spun off
- Successor: Pacific Brands, Ansell, Repco, GNB, Cochlear
- Headquarters: Melbourne, Australia
- Products: Tires, car batteries, food, cables, clothing, electronics, bedding, condoms

Pacific Dunlop was a highly diversified Australian conglomerate company that operated in, among other things, the Automotive, textile, electronics and biotechnology industries. Products commercialised included tires, car batteries, cables, clothing, electronics, bedding, condoms.

Facing financial difficulties, it rapidly spun off and sold its non-core assets before renaming itself Ansell in 2002. In 2006, it sold its tyre making business to Goodyear to focus on the manufacturing of latex products.

== History ==
Pacific Dunlop has its roots in the Irish Dunlop Pneumatic Tyre Company, which established the Dunlop Pneumatic Tyre Company of Australasia in 1893, which included a local finishing factory and office in Melbourne to supply the market with bicycle tyres. In 1899 downturn in cycling's popularity and speculation from the parent company led to the sell-off of Dunlop's Australasian and North American operations, and the Dunlop Pneumatic Tyre Company of Australasia was floated with 80,000 shares, costing £1 per share. The company was listed on Melbourne, Sydney and Adelaide stock exchanges.

In 1906, the company changed its name to the Dunlop Rubber Company of Australasia. World War I and the rise of the automobile proved to be a boom in demand for rubber products, and the company grew. In 1920, the company was incorporated in Victoria and Dunlop continued to expand merging with the Perdriau Rubber Company, a manufacturer of raincoats and boots in 1929, again renaming itself Dunlop Perdriau. In 1941, it again changed its name to Dunlop Rubber Australia. in 1969, Dunlop acquired Ansell Rubber, a disposable glove and condom manufacturer, and continued to expand. Establishing operations producing footwear, bedding and clothes.

During the 1970s, the company streamlined its rapidly growing operations and profits soared. In 1980, Dunlop merged with Olympic Industries, another manufacturer of tyres and cables, and owner of the Beaurepaires automotive service chain. The company was also renamed Dunlop Olympic. By 1984, the Dunlop Olympic severed all ties with Dunlop UK.

In 1986, Dunlop Olympic changed its name to "Pacific Dunlop", to reflect its region-wide status. The company was listed on the Tokyo and London Stock Exchanges. Pacific Dunlop and Goodyear formed a joint venture that consolidated both companies tyre manufacturing operations in the Asia Pacific region named South Pacific Tyres, or SPT. SPT made tyres featuring the Dunlop, Goodyear and Olympic brands. During the 1980s, the company continued to expand, acquiring Nucleus Limited and buying assets from the failing Adelaide Steamship Company, notably Petersville Sleigh, owners of Peters Ice Cream, Birds Eye, Edgell and the former Hardie rubber products and expanded polystyrene business. By 1991, Pacific Dunlop's Ansell had become the world's largest latex product manufacturer.

Pacific Dunlop became the third foreign company allowed to operate in China in 1993. By the mid-1990s, Pacific Dunlop was one of the 20 largest companies in Australia, with sales of over $6.3 billion and profits totalling the hundreds of millions. But by 1999 the company was facing financial difficulty and had a debt of $2.1 billion, Pacific Dunlop had already sold or spun off most of its food subsidiaries, as well as the Telectronics, Cochlear and RMax polystyrene businesses (the latter to Huntsman Chemical Australia, including the Hardie Coolite brand). In 2001, it sold Pacific Brands to CVC Asia Pacific and in 2002, it was renamed Ansell, the subsidiary which now accounted for the majority of its revenue.

Ansell maintained 50% ownership of South Pacific Tyres with Goodyear until 2006. SPT was closed in 2008.

== See also ==
- Wesfarmers, another Australian conglomerate
- Pacific Brands
- Cochlear Limited
