= Demant =

Medical equipment company

Demant A/S
- Formerly: William Demant Holding A/S (1997–2019); Oticon Holding A/S (until 1997)
- Type: Public (Aktieselskab)
- Traded as: Nasdaq Copenhagen: DEMANT
- Industry: Hearing healthcare
- Founded: 1904; 122 years ago
- Founder: Hans Demant
- Headquarters: Smørum, Egedal, Denmark
- Key people: Niels B. Christiansen (Chairman); Søren Nielsen (President & CEO)
- Products: Hearing aids, audiometric equipment
- Revenue: ▲DKK 22.419 billion (2024)
- Net income: ▲DKK 2.388 billion (2024)
- Total assets: ▲DKK 32.450 billion (2024)
- Total equity: ▲DKK 9.644 billion (2024)
- Owner: 55-60% is owned by William Demant Invest A/S (which is wholly owned by the William Demant Foundation)
- Number of employees: ▲ +22.000 (2024)
- Parent: William Demant Invest A/S
- Subsidiaries: Oticon; Bernafon
- Website: demant.com

Demant A/S is a Danish international company involved with hearing care, hearing aids and audiometric equipment. It is headquartered in Smørum (northwest of Copenhagen) and had a revenue of kr. 22,400,000,000 in 2024.

== History ==
=== Early 20th century ===
Hans Demant purchased his first hearing aid for his hearing-impaired wife in 1904. He won a contract with the American manufacturer General Acousticon Company that produced hearing aids called Acousticon. Demant sold his first hearing aids in Odense, Denmark. After Demant's death in 1910, his widow Camilla and their son William Demant, took over the responsibility of the company. William expanded distribution to Finland and Russia. In 1915, William, and his wife Ida Emilie Høst, traveled to Russia to sell hearing aids. William started the licensed production of hearing aids from General Acoustics Company. The new hearing aid, named Acousticus, becomes a registered trademark. He then began to import unassembled hearing aids without wires and batteries and set up a production line in Denmark to assemble the devices.

=== Postwar success ===
During World War II, William was unable to import good from the US, England and France. He therefore decided to produce components for the latest Acousticon devices in Denmark and start manufacturing the first Danish-made licensed hearing device - the Acousticus - a copy of the original Acousticon model. In 1943, Oticon become the official name of the company. After World War II has ended, the production of hearing aids in Denmark became a big success, and Oticon established an export business. Together, with American hearing aid producer Charles Lehman, they establish the American-Danish Oticon Corporation, headquartered in Copenhagen.

In 1957, William and his wife Ida Emilie donated the family's shares in the company to "William Demant and wife Ida Emilie's Foundation", also called the Oticon Foundation, which is now called the William Demant Foundation. The Foundation's general aim is charity, with particular emphasis on helping people with a hearing impairment.

During the 1960s, Oticon expanded with subsidiaries in the Netherlands, United States, Norway, Switzerland, and West Germany. Management also changed during this time, with Bent Simonsen, Henning Mønsted, Torben Nielsen, and Bengt Danielsen taking over Oticon, with Bent Simonsen as general manager.

Oticon established a temporary factory in Skinnerup near Thisted, Denmark. An additional factory in Scotland was also established. Oticon also expanded with subsidiaries in France and New Zealand. Eriksholm, Oticon's research centre was established outside of Elsinore, Denmark, in a newly renovated building. At the end of this decade, Oticon was the biggest supplier of hearing aids with a market share of almost 15 percent, and William Demant died.

Oticon Holding A/S is established in 1983. Oticon produced many powerful hearing instruments, including the E28P BTE, the I52 ITE, and the E43 hearing aid. Under the leadership of Lars Kolind, the company introduced a new and revolutionary way of working under the slogan "Time to think the unthinkable". Kolind also introduced the term 'spaghetti organisation', which is an organisation model he introduced in Oticon in 1991. This type of organisation has no formal hierarchical reporting relationships, a resource allocation system built around self-organised project teams, and an entirely open-plan physical layout. Oticon expanded further, establishing subsidiaries in Australia, Poland, South Africa, and China. The Group also acquired Bernafon, a hearing aid manufacturer based in Switzerland. The acquisition also included the manufacturer of diagnostics equipment, Maico, thus laying the foundation for the Group's diagnostic business activity.

In 1995, the company was listed on the Copenhagen Stock Exchange. In 1997, it was decided to change the name of the company from Oticon Holding A/S to William Demant Holding A/S, because it was considered disadvantageous to use the same name for both the corporate group and for one of its businesses. In 1998, Niels Jacobsen was appointed President & CEO of William Demant Holding A/S.

=== 21st century ===
William Demant Holding A/S acquired the Danish manufacturer Interacoustics, that specializes in diagnostic instruments and audiometers. The Group further expanded its portfolio with diagnostics instruments with the acquisition of Amplivox in 2008 and Grason-Stadler in 2009. At this point, Demant's Diagnostics Instruments solidified its position as the world's largest supplier of diagnostic equipment. In 2003, the German company Sennheiser electronic and William Demant Holding A/S establish a joint venture to produce and sell headsets for office and gaming, which would later be operated by Demant alone under the brand name EPOS.

In 2005, William Demant Holding A/S moved its headquarters and, at that time, 475 employees, to Smørum on the outskirts of Copenhagen. The location is still the headquarters today. Oticon established a subsidiary in Finland.

In 2010, Otix Global aws acquired, giving the Group a third hearing aid brand, Sonic. The Group acquired the French company Neurelec in 2013, adding cochlear implants to the hearing implants business. The year after, Neurelec is fully re-branded to Oticon Medical. Later, the Group launches its own cochlear implant, Neuro.

In 2015, William Demant Holding AS expanded its retail business with a majority stake in the French retailer, Audika.

In February 2017, it was announced that then-President and CEO Niels Jacobsen would step down after 25 years in charge of the company. Instead, he would become CEO of William Demant Invest A/S. As of 1 April 2017, the company has been led by President & CEO Søren Nielsen and by board chairman Niels B. Christiansen.

In 2018, William Demant Holding A/S and Sennheiser announced an end to their joint venture in headsets. Going forward, Enterprise Solutions and Gaming became independent divisions under the EPOS brand, which is fully owned by William Demant Holding A/S. William Demant Holding A/S and Philips announce a partnership where William Demant Holding A/S brings Philips branded hearing solutions to market, thus adding a fourth hearing aid brand to the Group.

In 2019, William Demant Holding A/S changed their name to Demant A/S and launched a new brand strategy to support collaboration across the Group. At the same time, the Oticon Foundation was renamed the William Demant Foundation.

EPOS was established as the Group's headset and meeting rooms solutions business. In 2024, the Group announced its intention to find a more suitable owner for EPOS.

In April 2022, Demant announced it had agreed to sell Oticon Medical to Australian company Cochlear Limited for kr. 850,000,000 and would exit the hearing implant business. In May 2024, the divestment of the cochlear implant business closed. In June, Demant acquired ShengWang and their network of 500 hearing aid clinics in China at a cost of CN¥ 1,750,000,000.

In 2025, Demant acquired Germany's KIND Group for €700,000,000.

== Business areas ==
The company has three business areas:

Hearing Aids
Oticon
Philips Hearing Solutions
Bernafon
Hearing Care / Retail
Audika (Australia, Belgium, Denmark, Germany, France, Hungary, Italy, Japan, New Zealand, Poland, Portugal, Spain, Sweden, Switzerland, The Netherlands, United Kingdom)
HearingLife (Canada, United States)
Hidden Hearing (Ireland)
Hearing Partners (Malaysia, Singapore)
Telex (Brazil)
SWTL (China)
Acoustica Medica (Greece)
Idis (Turkey)
Medton-Hedim (Israel)
Diagnostics
Maico Diagnostics
Interacoustics
Amplivox
Grason-Stadler
MedRx, Inc.
AudioScan
Inventis

Additional business Demant are or has been involved in:

Communications
EPOS
Hearing Implants
Oticon Medical (Cochlear implants have been divested, bone anchored implants have not yet been divested)
