= Cordis (medical) =

Medical device company

- Type: Private
- Industry: Medical device
- Founded: 1957
- Founder: Dr. William P. Murphy Jr.
- Headquarters: Miami Lakes, Florida, United States of America
- Number of employees: 4,100
- Website: Cordis.com

Cordis is an international medical device company that develops, manufactures, and markets cardiovascular and endovascular devices for diagnostics and interventional procedures to treat coronary and peripheral vascular diseases. Headquartered in Miami Lakes, Florida, the company operates in more than 70 countries and employes over 4,000 people worldwide.

Cordis was founded in 1957 by Dr. William P. Murphy Jr. as The Medical Development Corporation in Miami, Florida.

The company serves markets across North America, Europe, South America, Asia-Pacific, the Middle East, and Africa.

== History ==
1957

The Medical Development Corporation was founded in 1957 in Miami, Florida, by Dr. William P. Murphy Jr. and focused on interventional vascular medicine and neuroscience.

1959

The company's name was changed to Cordis.

1960s–1970s

Cordis expanded its portfolio of cardiovascular devices.

1996 - 1998

Johnson & Johnson acquired Cordis. and a year later, Cordis Corporation expanded into electrophysiology after Johnson & Johnson acquired Biosense Inc. and merged it with Cordis. In 1998, Biosense Inc. merged with Webster Laboratories to form Biosense Webster, Inc.

2015

Cardinal Health acquired the Cordis business from Johnson & Johnson for $1.944 billion. Cardinal Health acquired Cordis. Cardinal Health also owned Access Closure, Inc. (ACI), whose Mynx vascular closure portfolio became part of Cardinal Health's Medical segment alongside Cordis. On March 31, 2017, Cardinal Health announced two new strategic agreements that enabled Cordis, Cardinal Health's interventional vascular business, to expand its cardiology product offering in China.

2021

Cardinal Health divested Cordis and ACI in the same transaction to private equity firms Hellman & Friedman and KKR for $1 billion. The transaction was completed in August 2021.

2023

Cordis completes its acquisition of Swiss medical device company MedAlliance, adding the SELUTION SLR™ sirolimus drug-eluting balloon platform to its cardiovascular portfolio.

== Milestones and Firsts ==
Cordis has been associated with the development and commercialization of several arterial access, cardiovascular and endovascular interventional technologies, and vascular closure, including a number of devices that represented early milestones or firsts in interventional cardiology and vascular medicine.

1960s

During the 1960s, the company introduced and distributed pre-shaped diagnostic and guiding catheters developed by cardiologist Melvin P. Judkins. These catheters contributed to the standardization of coronary angiography techniques.

1970s

In 1974, Cordis introduced one of the earliest remotely programmable cardiac pacemakers and developed a catheter sheath introducer incorporating a hemostatic valve designed to reduce blood loss during vascular access procedures.

1980s - 1990s

During the 1980s and 1990s, the company expanded its interventional cardiology portfolio with balloon catheter technologies, including introducing the first nylon percutaneous transluminal coronary angioplasty (PTCA) balloon catheters.

Cordis also collaborated with physician and inventor Julio Palmaz in the development and commercialization of vascular stent technology. In 1991, the U.S. Food and Drug Administration (FDA) approved the PALMAZ ILIAC stent, first vascular stent approved for clinical use in the United States. In 1994, the FDA approved the PALMAZ-SCHATZ coronary stent, one of the first coronary stent systems to achieve widespread clinical adoption.

2000 - 2004

In 2003, the FDA approved the CYPHER sirolimus-eluting coronary stent, developed by Cordis and Johnson & Johnson. It was the first drug-eluting coronary stent approved in the United States and significantly reduced rates of restenosis compared with earlier bare-metal stents.

2022 - 2026

With its acquisition of MedAlliance in 2022, Cordis added a drug-eluting technology to its portfolio with the SELUTION SLR™ sirolimus drug-eluting balloon (DEB) platform.

In 2023, the FDA approved the PALMAZ MULLINS XD™ Pulmonary Stent for pediatric patients receiving treatment for pulmonary artery stenosis (PAS). This approval marked the first device of its kind approved to treat PAS in pediatric patients that offers an additional treatment option for patients.

Following regulatory approvals across Europe, Latin America, Middle East, and Asia Pacific; SELUTION SLR™ DEB became one of the first commercially available sirolimus drug-eluting balloon platforms. In 2026, Japan approved SELUTION SLR for the treatment of disease in the superficial femoral and popliteal arteries, making it the first sirolimus drug-eluting balloon approved in the country for those indications. In September 2026, SELUTION SLR™ DEB received FDA approval for the treatment of coronary in-stent restenosis (ISR), making it the first and only sirolimus drug-eluting balloon approved in the United States.
