= Cochlear Limited =

Australian medical device manufacturer

- Type: Public
- Traded as: ASX: COH; S&P/ASX 200 component
- Industry: Medical devices
- Founded: 1981 (as the Cochlear Project); incorporated in 1983
- Headquarters: Sydney, Australia
- Key people: Dig Howitt (chief electoral officer); Alison Deans (chair)
- Products: Cochlear implants Bone-anchored hearing aids Cochlear wireless accessories Bone anchored prosthetics
- Revenue: A$2.343 billion (2026)
- Net income: ▲ A$147.3 million (2026)
- Number of employees: 5,400 (2026)
- Website: www.cochlear.com

Cochlear Limited is a medical device company that designs, manufactures, and supplies implantable hearing systems. Its principal products include the Nucleus range of cochlear implants and the Baha and Osia bone conduction hearing systems.

Based in Sydney, Cochlear was formed in 1981 as a subsidiary of Nucleus with finance from the Australian government to commercialise the implants pioneered by Dr. Graeme Clark, although the company later became separate.

As of 2026, the company holds 60% of the cochlear implant market, with more than 800,000 people receiving one of Cochlear's implants.

== History ==
=== Corporate affairs ===
Cochlear was originally founded in 1981 as a subsidiary of Nucleus, a medical electronics company founded in 1964. Previously, in 1981, Nucleus received a grant from the Australian government to commercialize development of a multi-channel cochlear implant like the one that Graeme Clark created. The project was a success, with the first commercial implantation of a Nucleus implant taking place in 1982. Although it was established as a subsidiary of Nucleus, which was acquired by Pacific Dunlop in 1988, Cochlear soon became a separate and publicly listed company in 1995 when Pacific Dunlop was split up. In 2004 Cochlear expended its portfolio beyond cochlear implants by buying Entific Medical Systems, a Swedish company that produced bone anchored hearing aids for conductive hearing loss. Most of the company's income is from after-market (post-implantation) products such as processor upgrades and accessories. (Note: Cochlear Corporation was established in Australia in 1981; the American branch of the company, Cochlear Americas, was founded in 1984. This has led to some sources incorrectly reporting that Cochlear Ltd was founded in 1984.)

In April 2022, Cochlear announced it would acquire Danish competitor Oticon Medical for A$170 million after its parent company Demant decided to exit the hearing implant business. At the time, Oticon Medical was running at a loss, with sales lower than expected and technical problems affecting some of their devices, leading to a voluntary recall.

=== 2010 anti-kickback settlement ===
Cochlear Limited's 2007 annual report acknowledged that a US Federal investigation continued into its payments to physicians and providers. In February 2007, part of the whistleblower complaint against Cochlear filed by former vice president and director at Cochlear Americas Brenda March was unsealed by the U.S. District Court for the District of Colorado. The complaint alleges that Cochlear violated the Federal anti-kickback statute through its Partners Program, which offered credits towards free or discounted products for physicians who implanted Cochlear devices, as well as gifts, trips, and other gratuities paid to physicians and providers. The government intervened in the case and transferred it from the U.S. Department of Justice to the Health and Human Services Inspector General for the imposition of civil penalties. In June 2010, Cochlear America agreed to pay a fine of $880,000 as part of a settlement with the US Department of Justice.

== Historic products ==
=== Cochlear implants ===
==== Implants ====
CI22M (Nucleus 22) implant received FDA approval in 1985, making it the first FDA-approved multi-channel cochlear implant. While first approved for postlingually deaf adults, its FDA approval expanded to people ages two and up in 1990 after clinical trials on children.

In 1998 FDA approved the company's first Nucleus 24 family implant, the CI24M, which was the first cochlear implant to have a removable magnet to make it easier for patients to get an MRI. Nucleus 24 implants had 22 contacts. The next version of the Nucleus 24 to be approved by the FDA the CI24R implant, which came with the option of three different styles of electrode array. In 2005 the FDA approved the CI24RE "Freedom" implant, which had a new chip that reduced power consumption and better stimulation for improved sound processing. The implant had two options for the electrode array, both from the previous version of the CI24R "contour" options.

The CI500 implant range, which had 22 contacts enabling detection of 161 frequencies, was launched in 2009. When the whole CI500 family was recalled in 2011 due to soft failures of some CI512 implants, the CI500 family consisted of the CI512 and CI513 cochlear implants, the CI522, CI532 which had a perimodular electrode array, CI551 which had a double array, and the Nucleus ABI 541, which was an auditory brainstem implant version of the product.

In the mid to late 2000s, the company released its first short-electrode Hybrid implants, starting off with the Hybrid S8 and Hybrid S12; the devices were used in clinical trials and research on the potential for use in patients with severe to profound high-frequency hearing loss but significant low-frequency residual hearing. All Hybrid implants were paired with a sound processor fitted with an accompanying acoustic piece to amplify the lower frequencies in the recipient's residual hearing. Eventually, in 2014 the FDA approved the Nucleus L24 "Hybrid" implant (CI24REH) for use in people ages 18 and up.

The Nucleus Profile implant, approved by the FDA in summer 2015, succeeded the Nucleus 24 implant. At the time it was released, it was the thinnest cochlear implant on the market. However, the titanium case on the Profile implant was 2.5 times stronger than the previous Nucleus 24 implant. Just like its predecessor, a variety of electrode array options were available the Nucleus Profile.

==== Sound processors ====
===== Body-worn =====
The first sound processors made by the company were quite primitive compared to modern behind-the-ear and off-the-ear processors. The first sound processor made for the Nucleus 22 was the Wearable Sound Processor (WSP), an analog device that was only worn by adults; three versions of it were produced. Eventually, in 1989 it was replaced by the Mini Speech Processor, a slightly smaller body-worn digital processor. Subsequently in 1994 the company released the Spectra processor, which continued to improve audio processing, and became the last body-worn processor designed specifically for the Nucleus 22, as all later processors were made backwards-compatible with Nucleus 22 implants (meaning that the version of those processors were first released were compatible with newer implants and that only later were versions of those processors compatible with the Nucleus 22 were produced). In 1997 the company released the SPrint processor which had a small screen on it, and was compatible with the newly-developed Nucleus 24 implants, which received FDA approval in 1998. The SPrint became the last body-worn processor offered by the company; no Nucleus 22 version of it was made since the processor was made obsolete by the ESPrit that same year.

===== Behind-the-ear =====
In 1998 the company released its first processor that lacked a body-worn component, the ESPrit. However, the original ESPrit was only compatible with the Nucleus 24 implants, so in 2001 the ESPrit 22, which looked nearly identical to the ESPrit, was released for patients with older Nucleus 22 implants.

In 2002 the company released the ESPrit 3G for Nucleus 24 implants. It was the first processor equipped with telecoil, allowing streaming of audio wirelessly from certain sources such as phones and sound systems that were telecoil compatible. Later a version for older Nucleus 22 implants was released.

In 2005 the company released the Nucleus Freedom sound processor. Unlike previous processor upgrades, the Freedom was larger than its predecessor. Nevertheless, it had more sophisticated sound processing technology than the ESPrit 3G. While the previous ESPrit 3G and the earlier ESPrit required the use of disposable batteries, the Nucleus Freedom was the company's first behind-the-ear processor that offered a rechargeable power supply option. However, it was not until 2008 that a version of the Nucleus Freedom processor compatible with N22 implants was released.

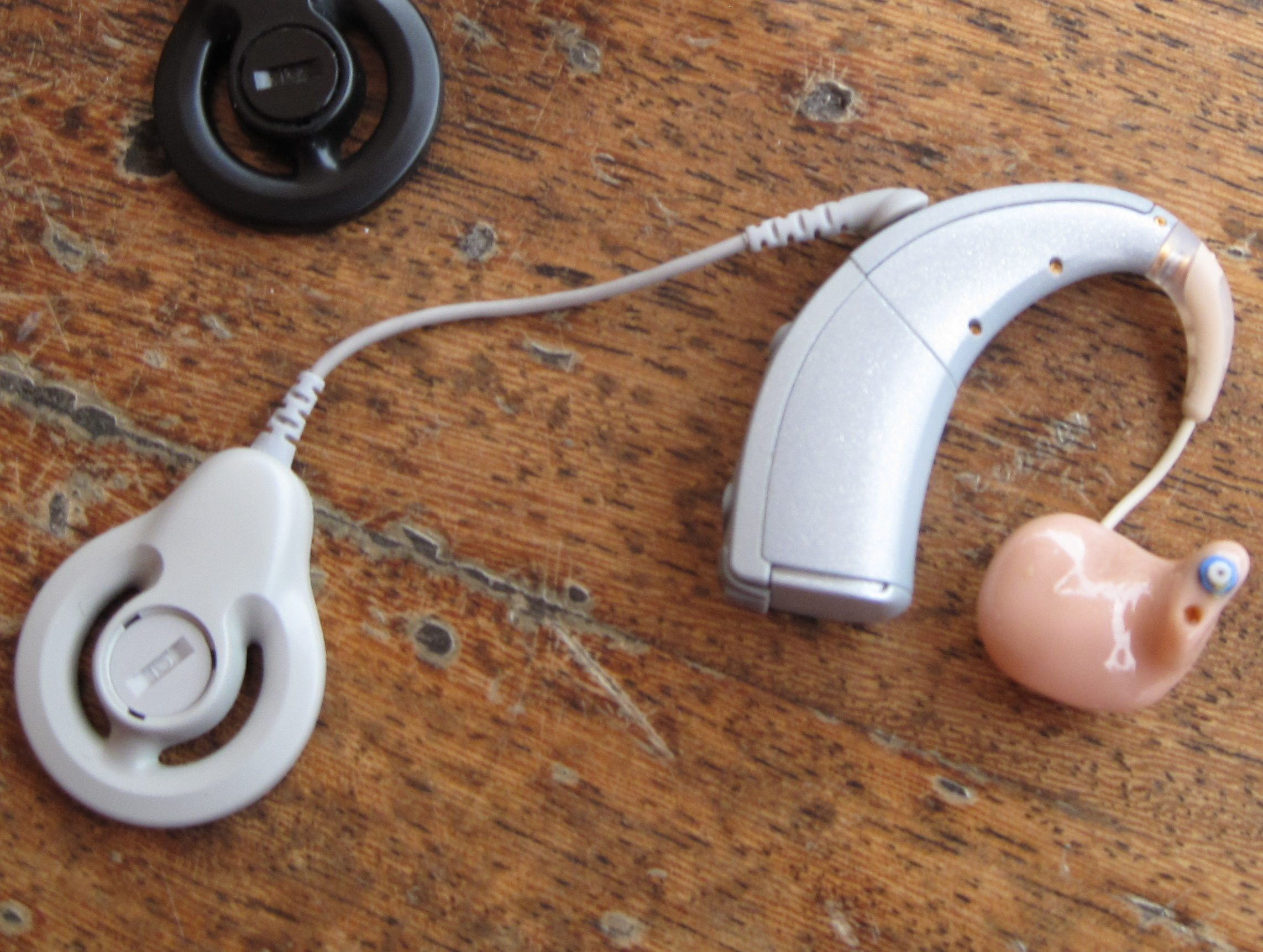
A Nucleus Freedom sound processor fitted with an acoustic earhook to enable EAS

An electric acoustic stimulation (EAS) or "hybrid" version of the Freedom sound processor that included an earhook with an acoustic component provided amplification of sounds that could be picked up by residual hearing was used in clinical trials of early Nucleus Hybrid S8 and S12 implants, making it the first Cochlear processor that capable of EAS.

The Nucleus 5 (CP800 series) sound processor was approved by the FDA in 2009. Despite being much smaller than its predecessor, it also had more sophisticated sound processing capability. Initially released with the CI500 series implant, it was eventually made compatible with the earlier Nucleus 24 series implants.

The Nucleus 6 (CP900 series) was released in 2013; while it looked very similar to the Nucleus 5 and contained many of the same features, it was slightly smaller and had more advanced computer chip. Both the Nucleus 5 and Nucleus 6 shared many of the same outward features, such as a direct audio input port, dual omnidirectional microphones, three battery options (rechargeable, compact rechargeable, and disposable), and many similar or even identical accessories. The Nucleus 6 was backwards compatible with all Nucleus implants at the time, from the current generation to the Nucleus 22.

===== One-piece =====
In 2016 the company released the Nucleus Kanso processor, first one-piece sound processor made by the company. The electronics in and features of the device were nearly identical as in the previous Nucleus 6. However, because of its size and positioning, it is more easily concealed by hair or a hat.

==== Accessories ====
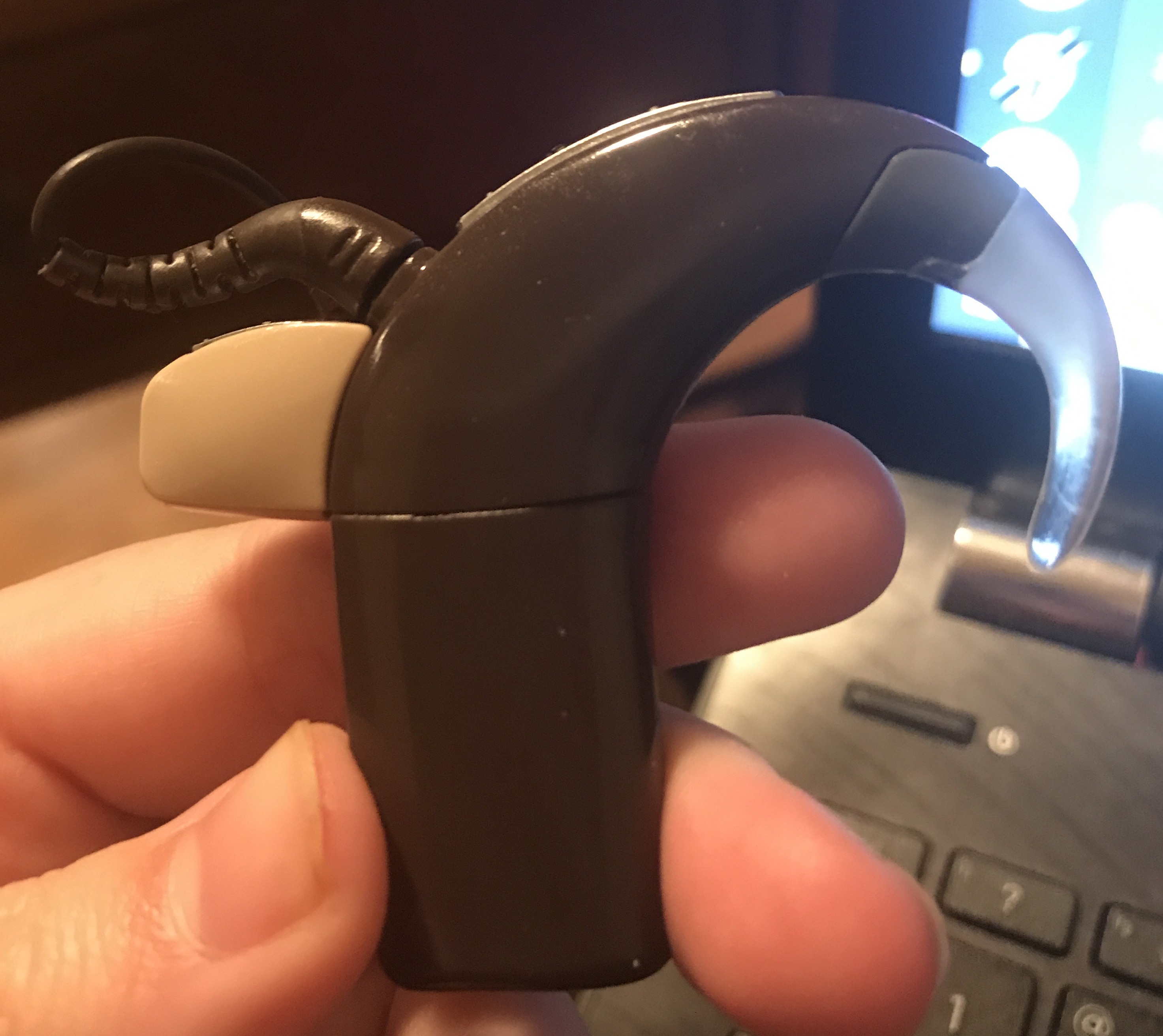
A Nucleus 6 sound processor equipped with an FM receiver (in light brown)

In 2013 Cochlear released the "Aqua Accessory", a sealable single-use plastic pouch shaped to fit a Nucleus 5 processor. When used properly, it gave an IP68 water resistance level to the processor inside. However, it soon became obsolete by the 2014 introduction of the Aqua+ kit, which consisted of a waterproof coil and a silicone sleeve for the processor unit.

Other accessories include a TV streamer using ReSound technology that allows streaming of audio directly to sound processor, a wireless mini mic that can be worn be the person speaking with the implant user, and a wireless phone clip for streaming audio from a bluetooth-enabled device to the sound processor.

Various sound processor models have been designed to be compatible with certain FM receivers made by other companies specifically for use in the given sound processor. For example, the Phonak Roger 20 made by Phonak is compatible with the Nucleus 7, where the receiver can be connected between the processing unit and the battery pack. However, the previous Roger 14 that was used with Nucleus 5 and Nucleus 6 devices was plugged into the side of the processor unit (pictured). Other earlier processors like the ESPrit and Freedom also had FM options.

=== Auditory brainstem implants (ABI) ===
The company also produces auditory brainstem implants, which look similar to cochlear implants but bypass the cochlea completely, instead placing a rectangular electrode array on the cochlear nucleus of the brainstem. The first ABI made by the company was the Nucleus 22ABI, released in the early 1990s. It had eight electrodes, utilized parts from the Nucleus 22 cochlear implant, and utilized the Spectra sound processor. This was followed by the 1999 introduction of an improved ABI based on the Nucleus 24, the Nucleus ABI24, which had 21 electrodes and allowed for more advanced audio processing in addition to having a removable magnet; in 2000 it was approved by the FDA for use in people with Neurofibromatosis Type 2 ages 12 and older. In 2016 the Nucleus Profile ABI541 received FDA approval.

== Modern systems ==
As of 2022, the latest cochlear implant is the Nucleus Profile Plus implant, which can withstand a 3.0 Tesla MRI without having the magnet removed or needing a headwrap. In 2019, the Osia OSI200 osseointegrated steady-state implant and the accompanying Osia 2 sound processor were also approved. Earlier in 2013, the FDA approved the BAHA BI300 implant as part of the BAHA Attract system; the device is also incorporated in the Osia system.

As of 2022, the current behind-the-ear cochlear implant sound processor is the Nucleus 7 (CP1000 series), which was released in 2017. It is smaller and lighter than the Nucleus 6, and can stream audio directly from certain Apple devices without the need for an additional device; however, users with Android phones have to use the phone clip accessory to stream audio to the Nucleus 7. The Nucleus 7 also has a battery life that is 50% longer than the Nucleus 6. The processor can also be controlled via a downloadable phone app instead of a separate remote control, although a separate remote control is available. The Nucleus 7 is also compatible with a bimodal hearing system (the use of a cochlear implant in one ear and a hearing aid in the other). If the user has a ReSound Enzo 3D or Lynx 3D hearing aid in their non-implanted ear, they can stream audio from certain sources such as compatible Apple devices to both ears at the same time. However, the device does not have a port for direct auditory input. Like its predecessors, a version of it with an acoustic receiver for EAS is available. It is compatible with all generations of nucleus implants.

The company released the Nucleus 8 in summer 2022, but it is not expected to be available to most recipients until 2023.

The other modern sound processor for cochlear implants is the Kanso 2, which was released in 2020; it is compatible with the same app and accessories as the Nucleus 7 and is smaller than the original Kanso. However, unlike the Nucleus 7, there is no EAS option due to it being an off-ear device, and it is compatible with the original Nucleus 22 implant.

In 2021 the company released the BAHA 6 Max Sound Processor for users of BAHA implants; it was smaller than the previous generation processor.

== Recalls ==
Cochlear recalled some of its CI22M (Nucleus 22) implants in 1995 due to failures with the internal power supply caused by the capacitors being installed backwards, however less than 10 devices had to be explanted.

On 12 September 2011, Cochlear announced that they were voluntarily recalling all Nucleus CI500 implants after reports of the devices shutting down. The cause of the malfunction and number of devices affect is unknown, however, no patients suffered injuries from the device failures, and the company want back to the CI24RE implant until launching a replacement in 2013. The CEO said in a press conference that manufacturing of those devices would cease until the cause of the malfunction is evaluated. Representatives of the company further elaborated that the reason for the recall being that they did not want to suffer more failures that could hurt the reputation of the company. The recall resulted in a drop of 27% of the companies shares, as the product being recalled made up 70% of Cochlear's total company sales.

== Union relations ==
Fair Work Australia issued bargaining orders against Cochlear Limited in relation to breaching good faith bargaining requirements under the Fair Work Act after a long bargaining battle. Workers at the company's Sydney manufacturing facility in Australia, represented by the Australian Manufacturing Workers Union, had been attempting to bargain with Cochlear starting 2007 after the company tried to switch to individual contracts. Majority vote of workers supported collective bargaining, but negotiations went to a standstill for a while, and the union accused Cochlear of not engaging in good-faith negotiations.

== Gallery ==
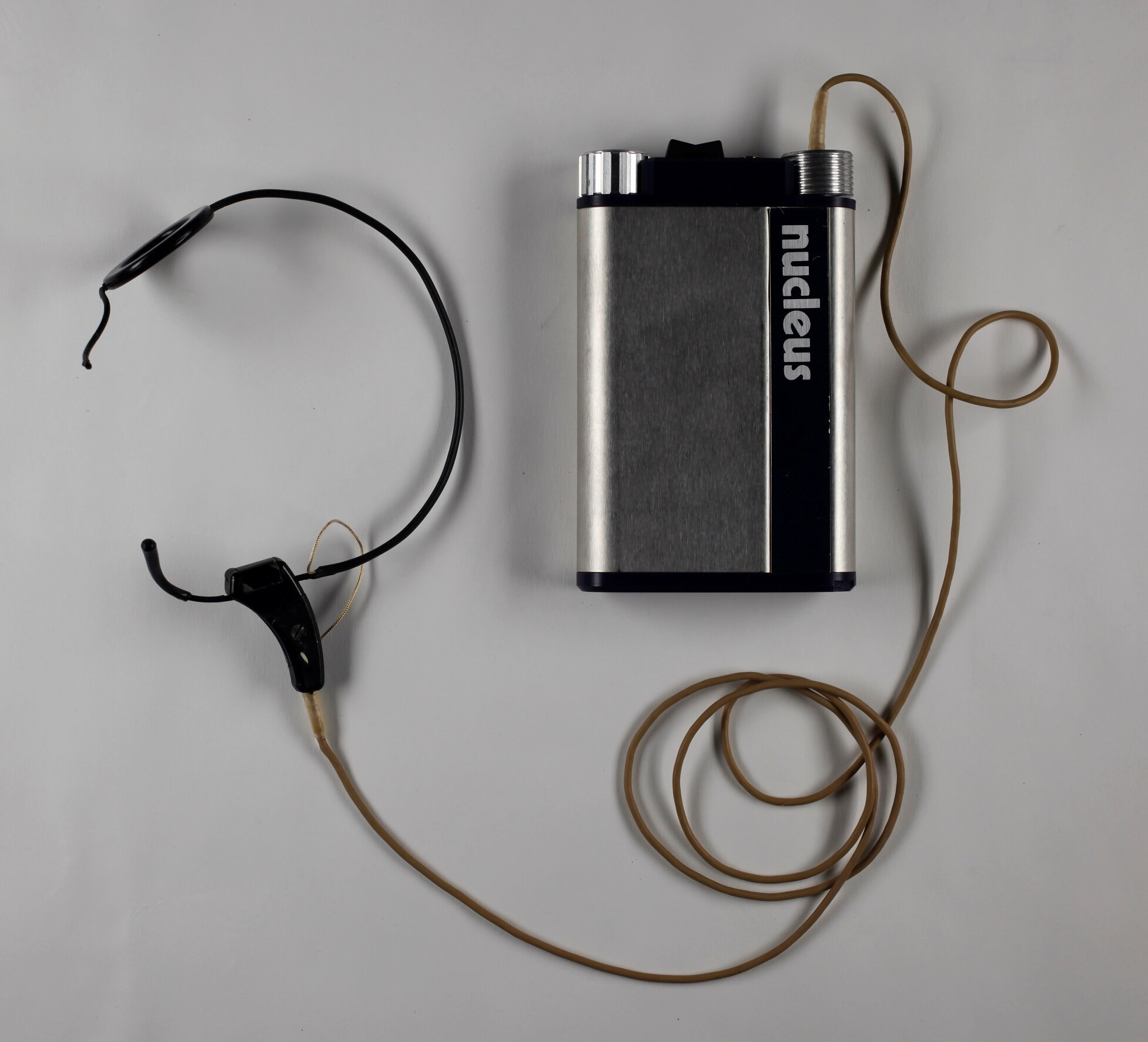
early 1980s wearable sound processor with headset

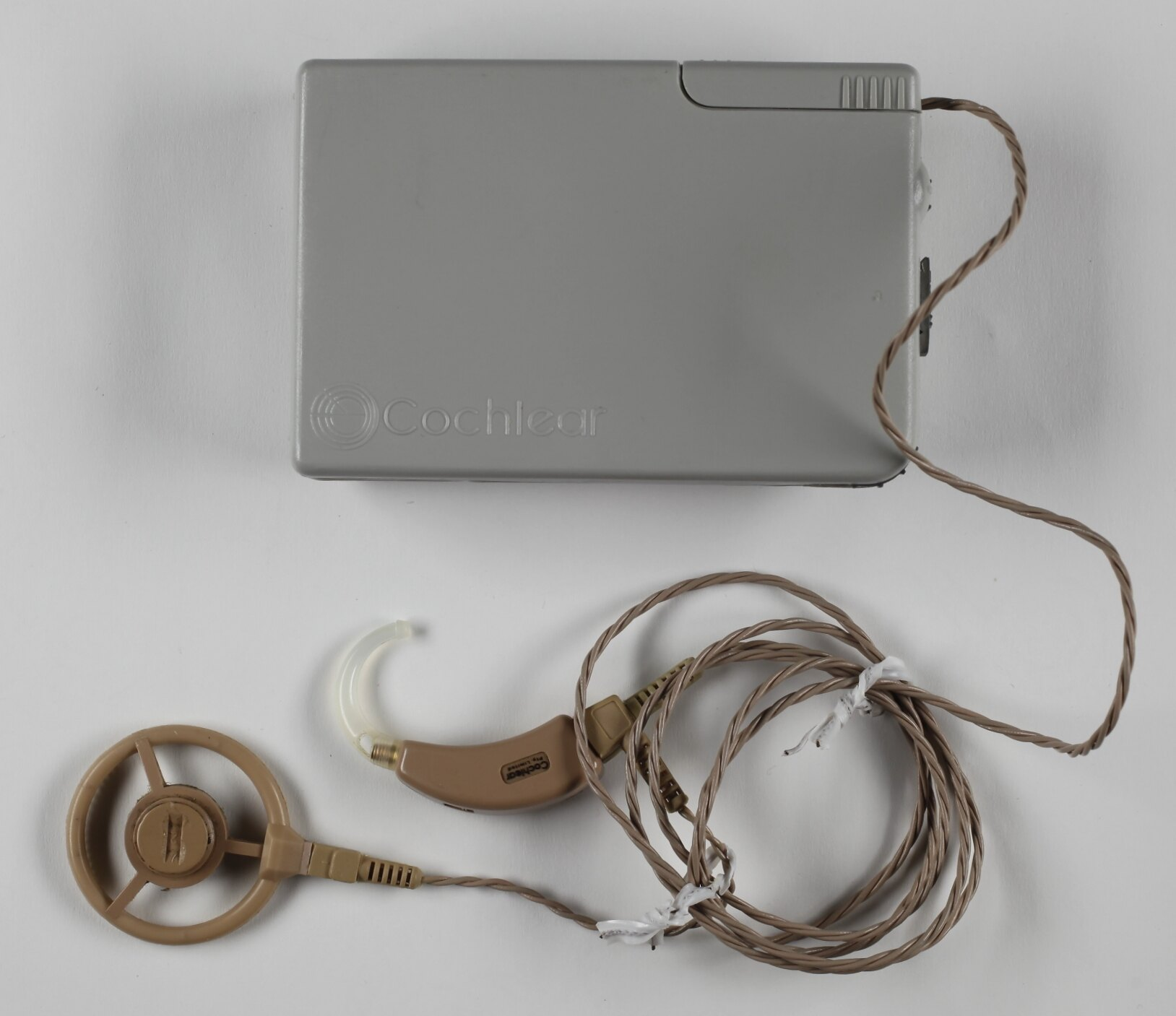
1989 Mini Speech Processor

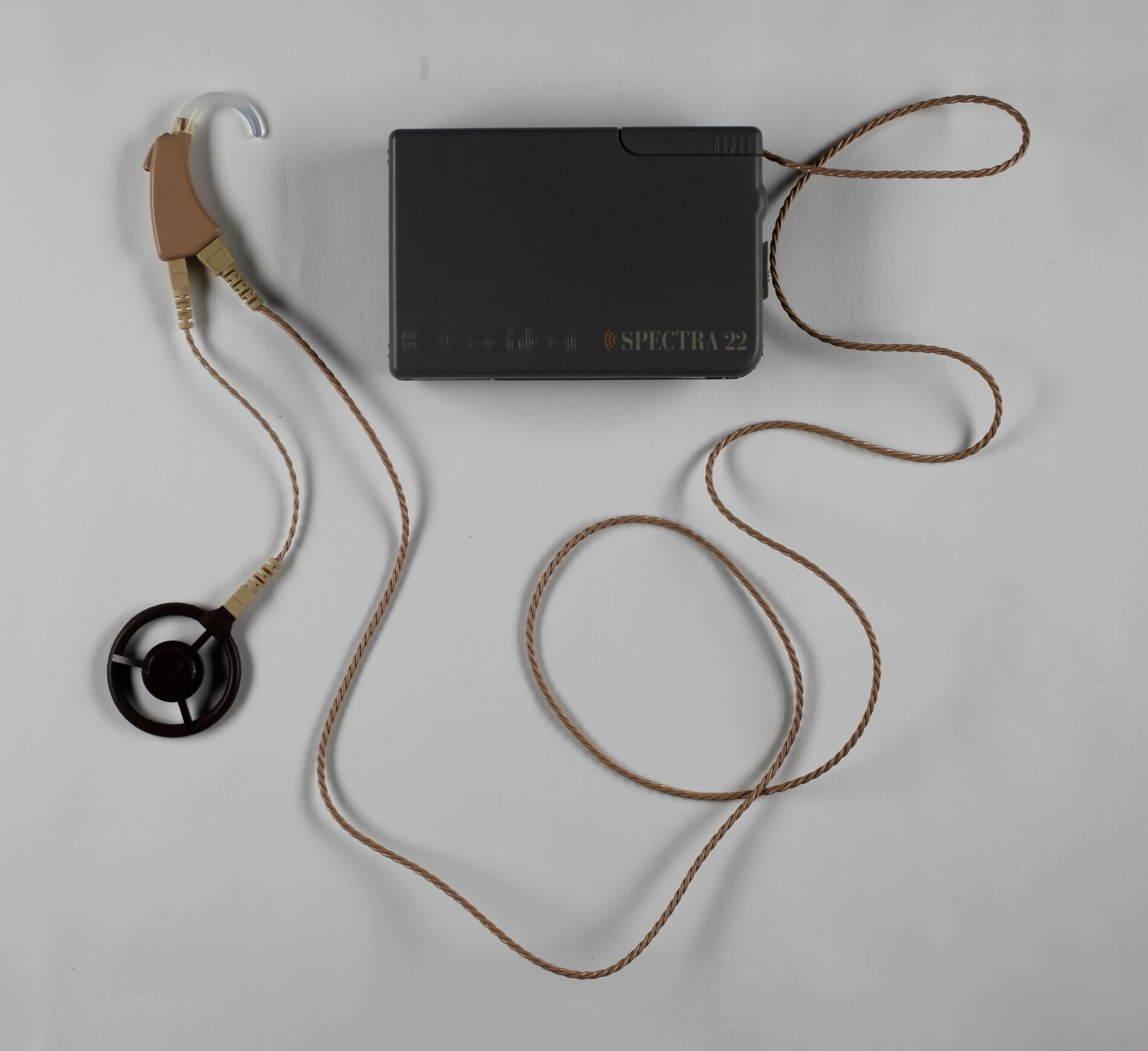
1994 Spectra body-worn processor

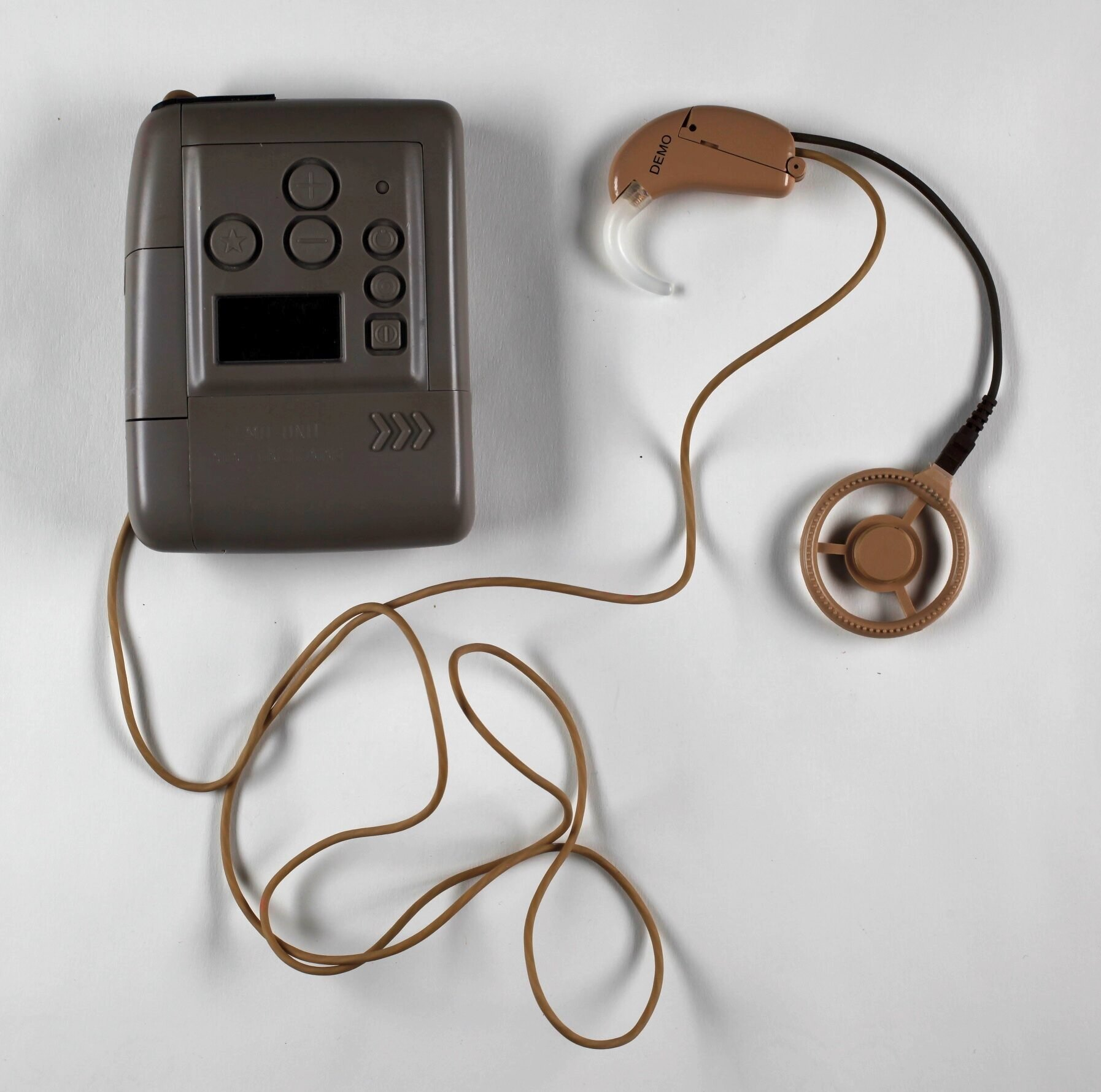
1997 SPrint body-worn processor

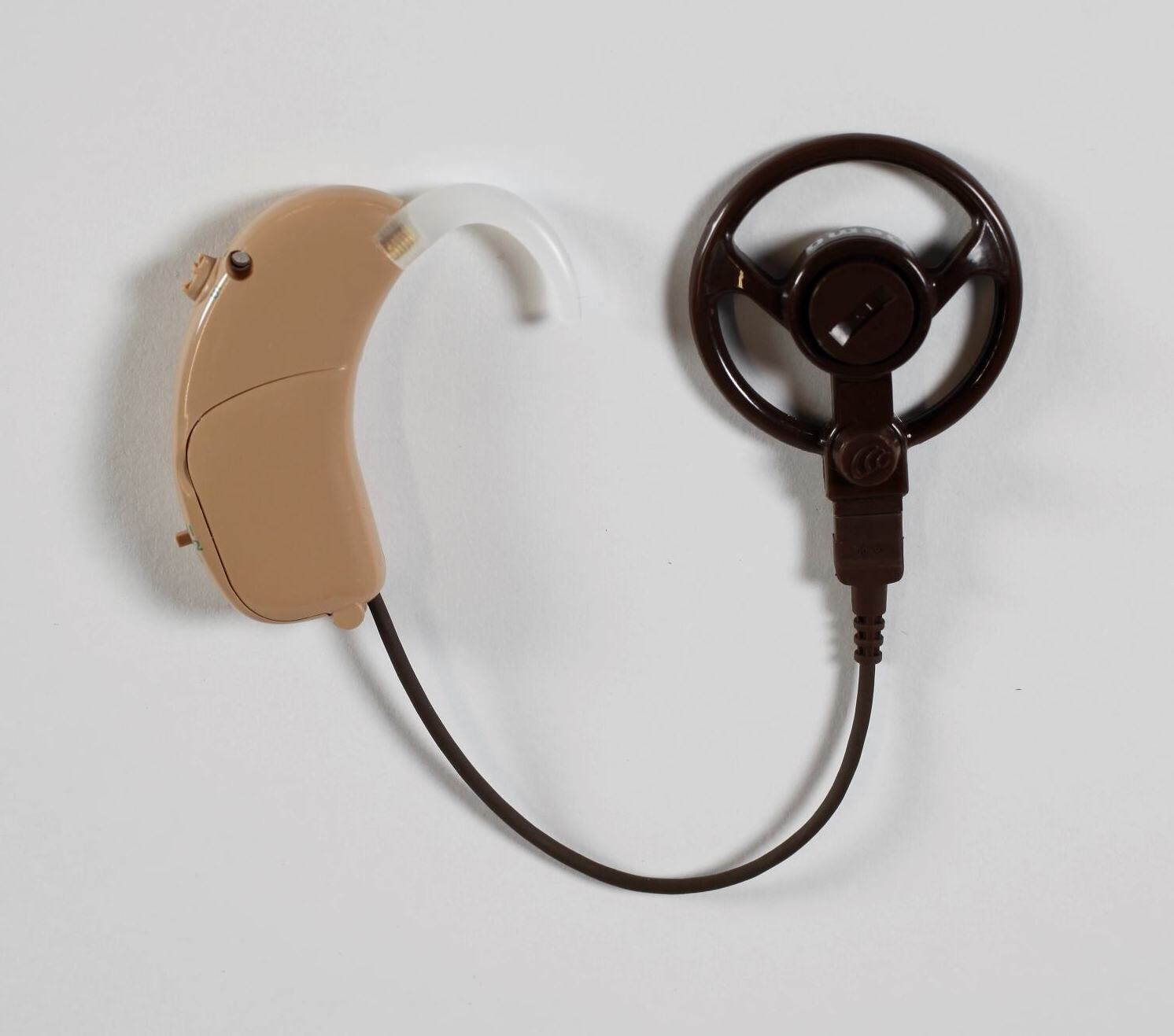
1998 ESPrit

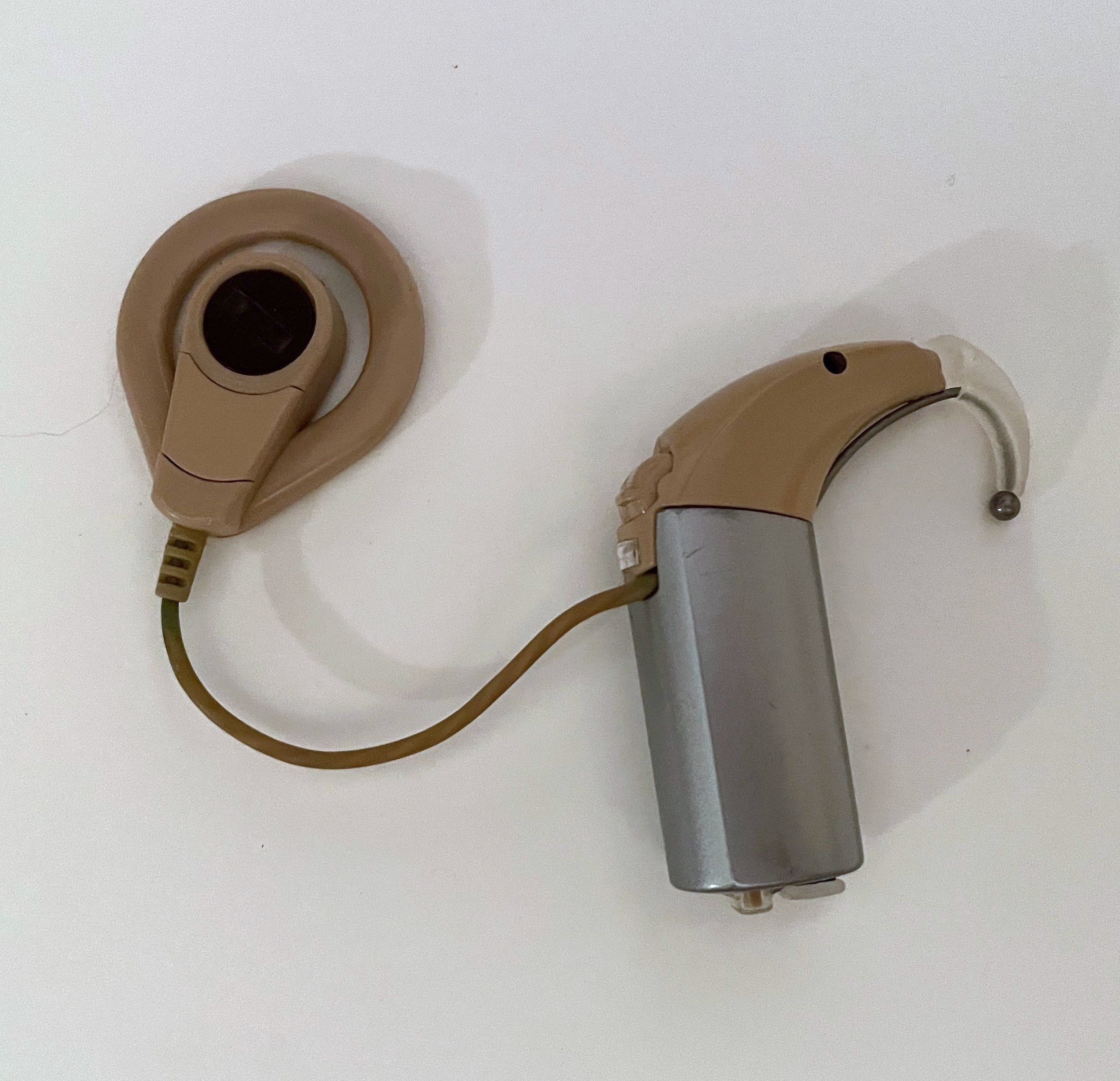
2002 ESPrit 3G

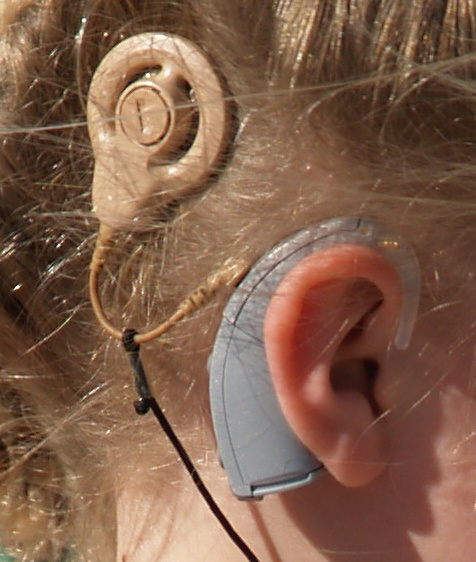
2005 Nucleus Freedom

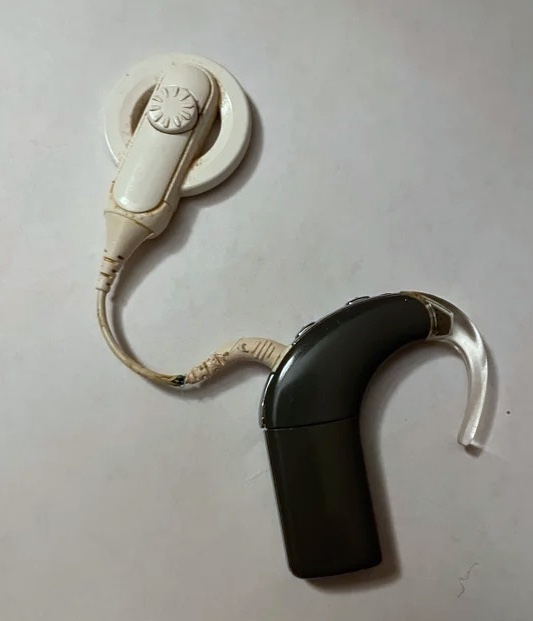
2009 Nucleus 5

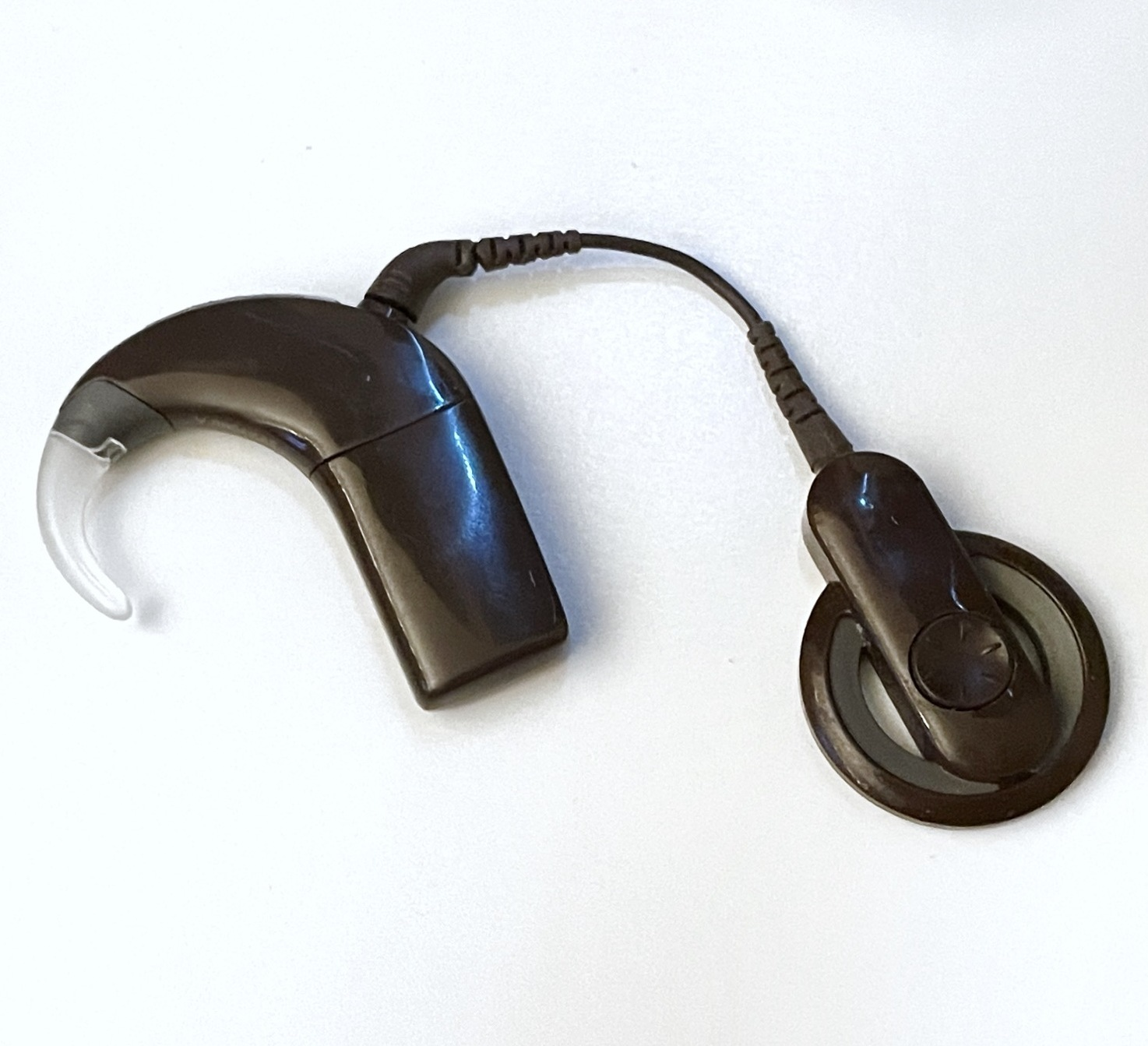
2013 Nucleus 6

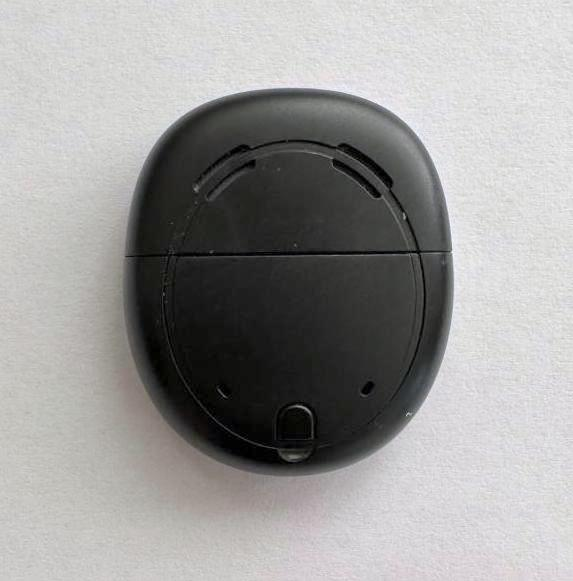
2016 Nucleus Kanso 1

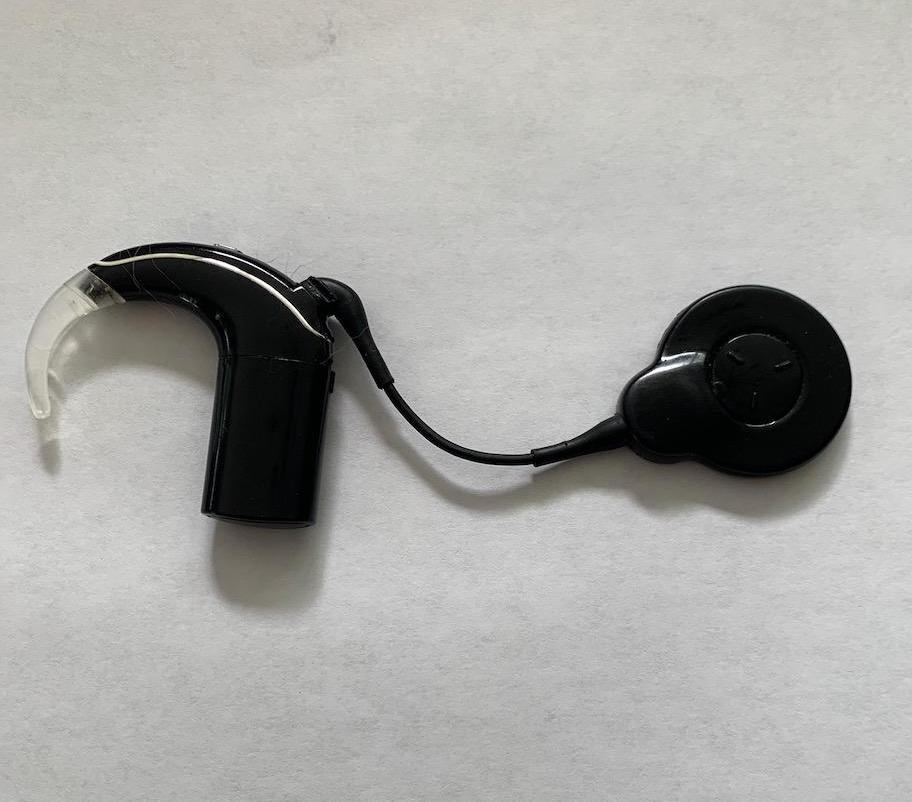
2017 Nucleus 7

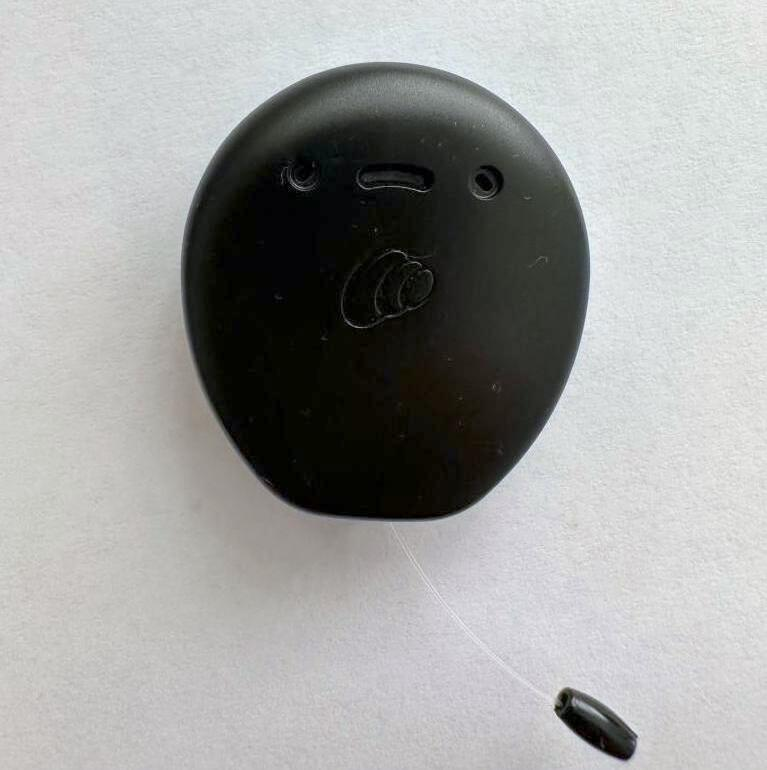
2020 Kanso 2

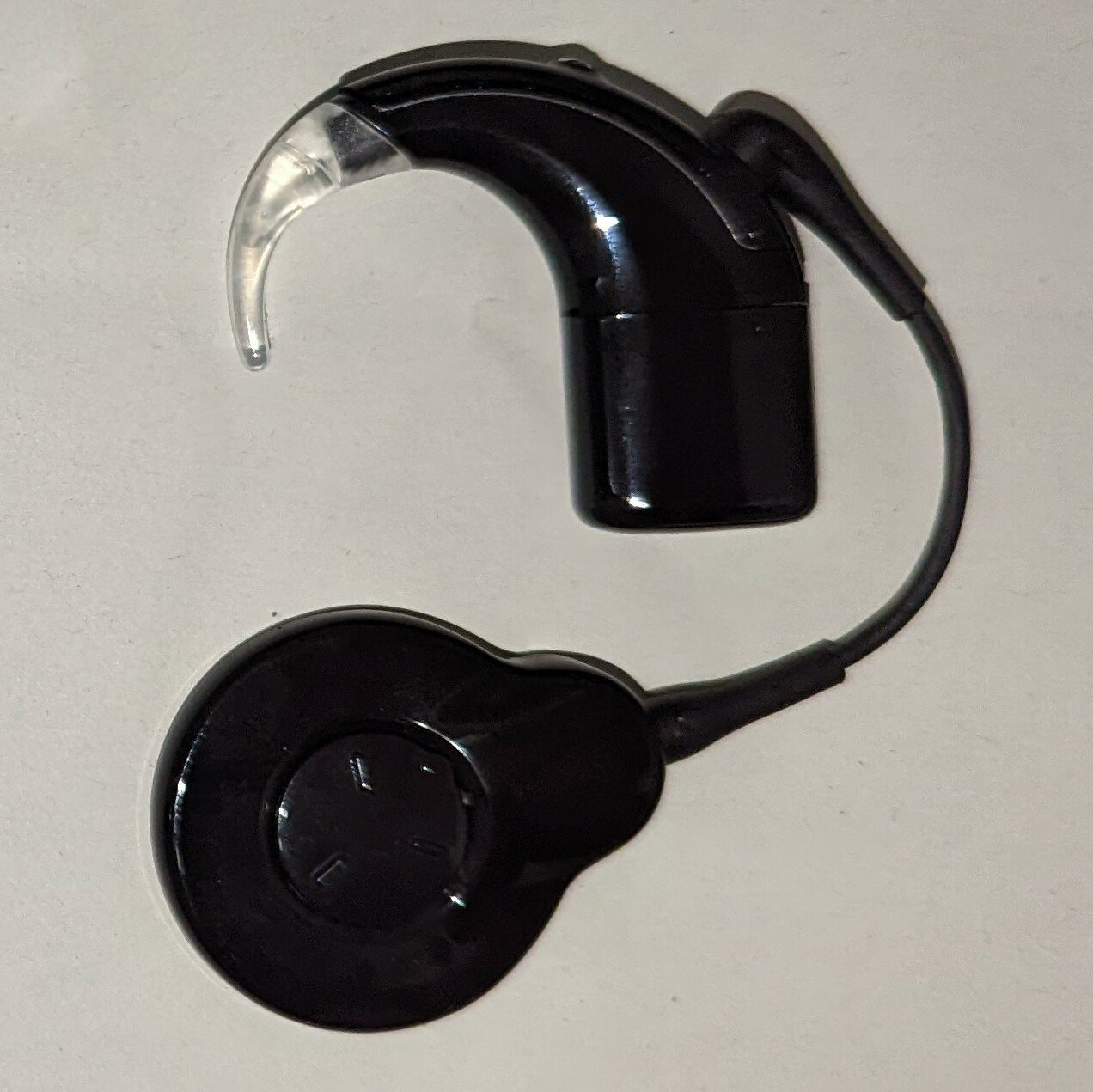
2022 Nucleus 8

== See also ==
- Advanced Bionics
- MED-EL
