= Ansell =

Australian manufacturer of protective products

Ansell Limited

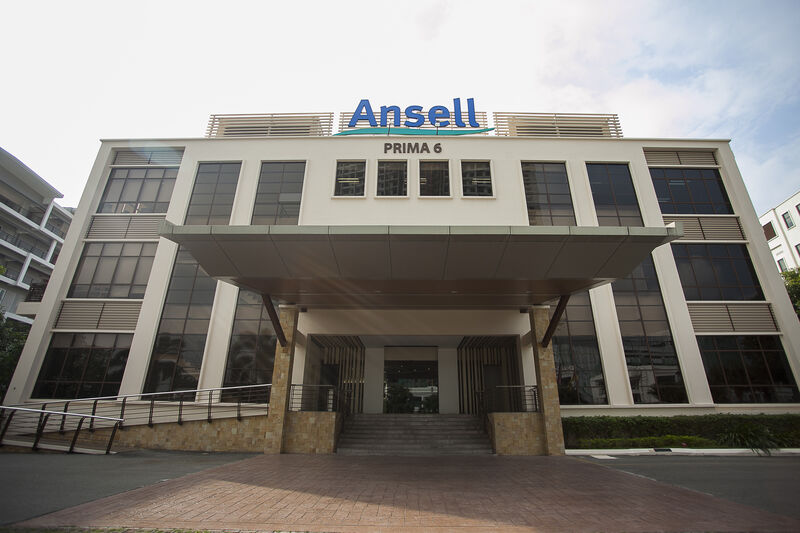
- Ansell office in Cyberjaya
- Type: Public
- Traded as: ASX: ANN
- ISIN: AU000000ANN9
- Industry: Manufacturing
- Founded: 1893; 133 years ago (as Dunlop Perdriau Ltd.)
- Founder: Eric Norman Ansell
- Headquarters: Richmond, Victoria, Australia
- Area served: Worldwide
- Key people: Nathalie Ahlström (CEO)
- Products: Personal protective equipment, Gloves, Medical gloves, Cut-resistant gloves, Rubber gloves, Hazmat suit
- Revenue: ▲US$2.14 billion (2026)
- Operating income: ▲US$320.5 million (2026)
- Net income: ▲US$208.6 million (2026)
- Total assets: ▼US$3.29 billion (2026)
- Total equity: ▲US$2.02 billion (2026)
- Number of employees: ▼15,409 (2026)
- Website: ansell.com

Ansell Limited is an Australian company which manufactures gloves and personal protection equipment, primarily from latex and rubber. The products are designed for healthcare professionals, industrial workers, and end consumers.

== History ==
=== Early years ===
Ansell's history began in 1893 with the Dunlop Pneumatic Tyre Company of Australasia being listed on the Australian Stock Exchange. Eric Norman Ansell, later to found Ansell, worked at the company as a mechanic then, in 1905, he left to set up his own business manufacturing condoms.

Between 1905 and 1929, Eric Ansell dedicated himself to broadening his rubber manufacturing experience, producing new types of products such as balloons and household gloves. Finally in 1929, his company was registered as E.N. Ansell & Sons Pty Ltd. In 1934, the company's name was changed to The Ansell Rubber Company Pty Ltd. More than thirty years later, in 1965, Ansell introduced its first disposable surgical gloves under the Gammex brand. Innovative for their time, the gloves were sterilized using gamma radiation and then packaged so they were ready-to-wear.

In 1906, Dunlop was renamed to Dunlop Rubber Company of Australasia. In 1929, it merged with the Perdriau Rubber Company, a manufacturer of general rubber products based in Sydney, forming Dunlop Perdriau. The new company focused primarily on the production of automobile tyres and later expanded into other rubber products. In 1967, the company changed its name to Dunlop Australia, and in 1969 it acquired Ansell.

=== Late 20th century ===
In 1980, Dunlop Australia merged with diversified industrial company BTR Nylex to form Dunlop Olympic. This merger aimed to expand the company's product range and market presence beyond rubber products to various industrial and consumer goods. In 1986, Dunlop Olympic changed its name to Pacific Dunlop Limited.

=== Recent years ===
During the late 1980s and 1990s, Pacific Dunlop continued to expand and diversify its operations. In 1996, Pacific Dunlop announced a strategic initiative to focus on core businesses, and a divestment program to sell off non-core assets. In 2001, Pacific Dunlop divested its healthcare safety division, which included Ansell. This divestment allowed Ansell to establish itself as a stand-alone company with global expertise in manufacturing and marketing gloves and protective equipment. Since this point, Ansell has grown organically and through acquisition.

Acquisitions between 2000 and 2024 have been focussed on several industries:

- Protective gloves:
  - Marigold Industrial (UK), known for industrial gloves.
  - Hawkeye Glove Manufacturing, in the protective gloves market.
  - VibraGuard, a manufacturer of gloves for vibration protection.
  - Comasec, a European-based company specializing in protective gloves.
  - BarrierSafe Solutions International, a leading North American provider of disposable gloves.
  - Hands International, a Sri Lankan glove manufacturer.
  - Hercules Equipments Ltd., a Brazilian industrial safety gloves manufacturer.
  - Nitritex, a UK-based supplier of cleanroom gloves.
  - Primus Gloves, in the Indian market.
- Protective clothing:
  - Trelleborg Protective Products, known for chemical protective clothing.
  - Microgard, a UK-based manufacturer of chemical protective clothing.
  - Kimberly-Clark's Personal Protection Equipment business.
- Medical protection:
  - Sandel Medical Industries, medical safety products.

In 2017, Ansell sold its sexual wellness business to Chinese companies Humanwell Healthcare and CITIC Capital in a move to divest non-core business and increase focus on safety and personal protection equipment (PPE) products and services.

== Sustainability ==
In July 2022, Ansell announced their ambition to be net zero in Scope 1 and 2 emissions by 2040. They plan to achieve this by reducing dependency on fossil fuels and shifting to renewable energy sources; innovating around products and business models, while also improving circularity; and collaborating through value chain partnerships and policy advocacy. Since then, Ansell has been recognized by Morningstar Sustainalytics as an ESG industry top-rated company in 2023 and 2024, and their Coimbatore manufacturing facility in India achieved a platinum rating from the Indian Green Building Council (IGBC) for their Packing and Sterilization Facility in 2023.

== Responsible Glove Alliance (RGA) ==
The Responsible Glove Alliance (RGA) was launched in March 2022, of which Ansell was one of the seven founding members. The RGA's initial focus is the Malaysian rubber glove manufacturing industry, as Malaysia is the world's largest producer of rubber gloves and the industry relies heavily on migrant labour.

== Sustainability awards and ratings ==
- Being listed as an ESG Top-Rated Company by Morningstar Sustainalytics
- Winning two 2024 SEAL Business Sustainability Awards
- Being featured in the Asia-Pacific Climate Leaders 2024 list by The Financial Times and Statista

== Sectors ==
Today, Ansell serves a multitude of sectors with its range of personal protective equipment. The sectors include:

- Agriculture
- Automotive
- Chemical
- Diving
- Energy
- Food Processing
- Laboratory
- Life Sciences
- Machinery & Equipment
- Mining
- Warehousing & Logistics
