= HMAS Kanimbla (C78) =

1935 passenger vessel converted to armed merchant cruiser and infantry landing ship

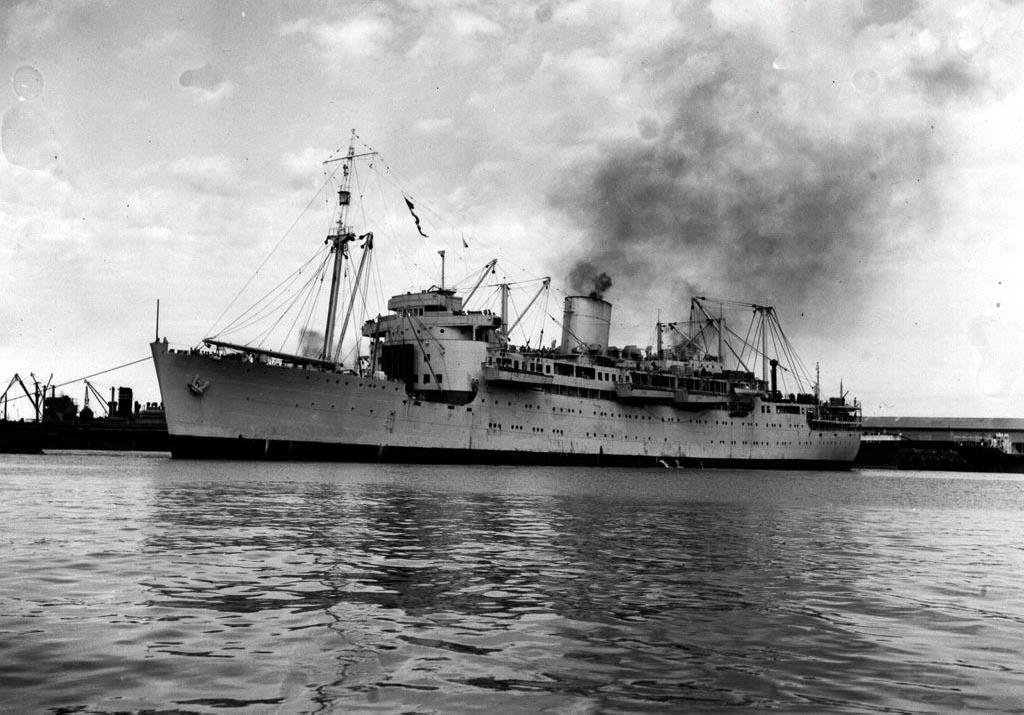
- HMAS Kanimbla at Fremantle Harbour 1945

History

United Kingdom / Australia
- Namesake: Kanimbla Valley
- Builder: Harland & Wolff, Belfast
- Laid down: July 1933
- Launched: 15 December 1935
- Commissioned: 6 September 1939 (Royal Navy)
- Recommissioned: 1 June 1943 (Royal Australian Navy)
- Decommissioned: 25 March 1949
- Renamed: MV Kanimbla (1936–1939); HMS Kanimbla (1939–1943); HMAS Kanimbla (1943–1950); Oriental Queen (1961 onwards)
- Reclassified: Passenger vessel (1936–1939); Armed merchant cruiser (1939–1943); Landing Ship Infantry (1943–1950); Passenger vessel (1950 onwards)
- Motto: "Cry Havoc"
- Honours and awards: Battle honours: New Guinea 1944; Leyte Gulf 1944; Lingayen Gulf 1945; Borneo 1945; Pacific 1945
- Fate: Returned to civilian service
- Badge

General characteristics
- Tonnage: 10,985 GRT
- Length: 468.8 ft (142.9 m)
- Beam: 66.3 ft (20.2 m)
- Draught: 24.4 ft (7.4 m)
- Propulsion: Diesel engines, twin screws. 10,000 horsepower
- Speed: 19 knots (35 km/h; 22 mph)
- Capacity: 1,380 troops (as landing ship)
- Complement: 345
- Armament: (as merchant cruiser): 7 × 6-inch guns; 2 × 3-inch anti-aircraft guns; 2 × Lewis light machine guns; (as landing ship): 1 × 4-inch gun; 2 × 40mm Bofors anti-aircraft guns; 2 × 2-pounder anti-aircraft guns; 12 × 20mm Oerlikon anti-aircraft guns

HMAS Kanimbla was a passenger ship converted for use as an armed merchant cruiser and landing ship infantry during World War II. Built during the mid-1930s as the passenger liner MV Kanimbla for McIlwraith, McEacharn & Company, the ship operated in Australian waters until 1939, when she was requisitioned for military service, converted into an armed merchant cruiser, and commissioned in the Royal Navy as HMS Kanimbla.

Initially used to board and take control of merchant vessels belonging to Occupied Europe and operating in Asian waters, Kanimbla led the raid to capture the Iranian port of Bandar Shahpur in August 1941, and was present during the covert Japanese midget submarine attack on Sydney Harbour in 1942. In 1943, the ship was converted into a Landing Ship Infantry, transferred to the Royal Australian Navy, and operated throughout the South West Pacific Theatre until the end of the war.

Kanimbla was decommissioned and returned to her commercial owners in 1950. In 1961, she was sold to the Pacific Transport Company and renamed Oriental Queen. The ship operated as a liner throughout the Pacific and to Japan until 1973, when she was broken up for scrap.

== Construction ==
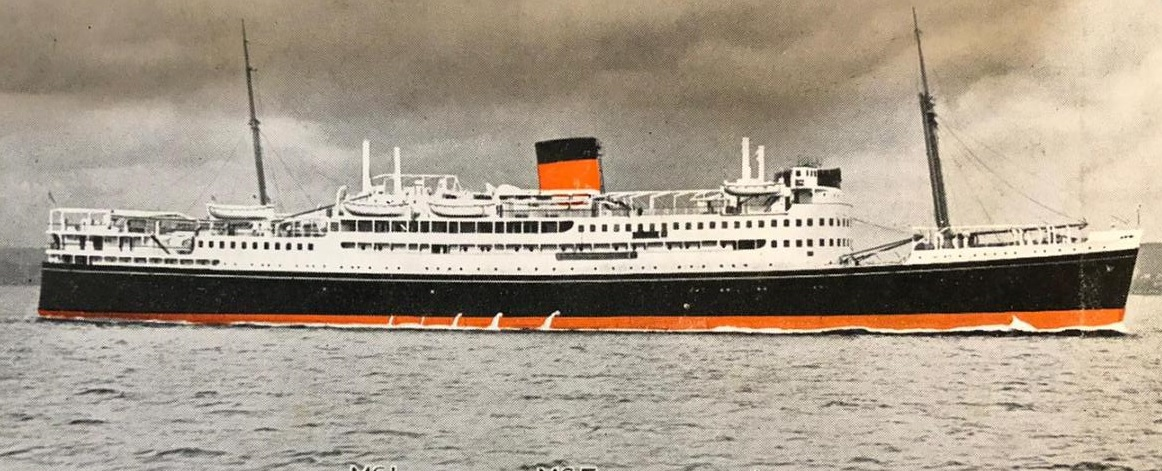
MV Kanimbla Mc Ilwraith Mc Eacharn's Line

The ship was laid down as motor vessel (MV) Kanimbla for McIlwraith, McEacharn & Company by Harland & Wolff, Belfast. She was launched on 15 December 1935 and completed in 1936.

The ship was named for the Kanimbla Valley, west of Blackheath in the Blue Mountains in New South Wales. A Sydney Ferries Limited ferry, launched in 1910 as Kanimbla gave up her name to the new larger vessel in 1936, and was renamed Kurra-Ba.

== Operational history ==
=== Pre-war ===
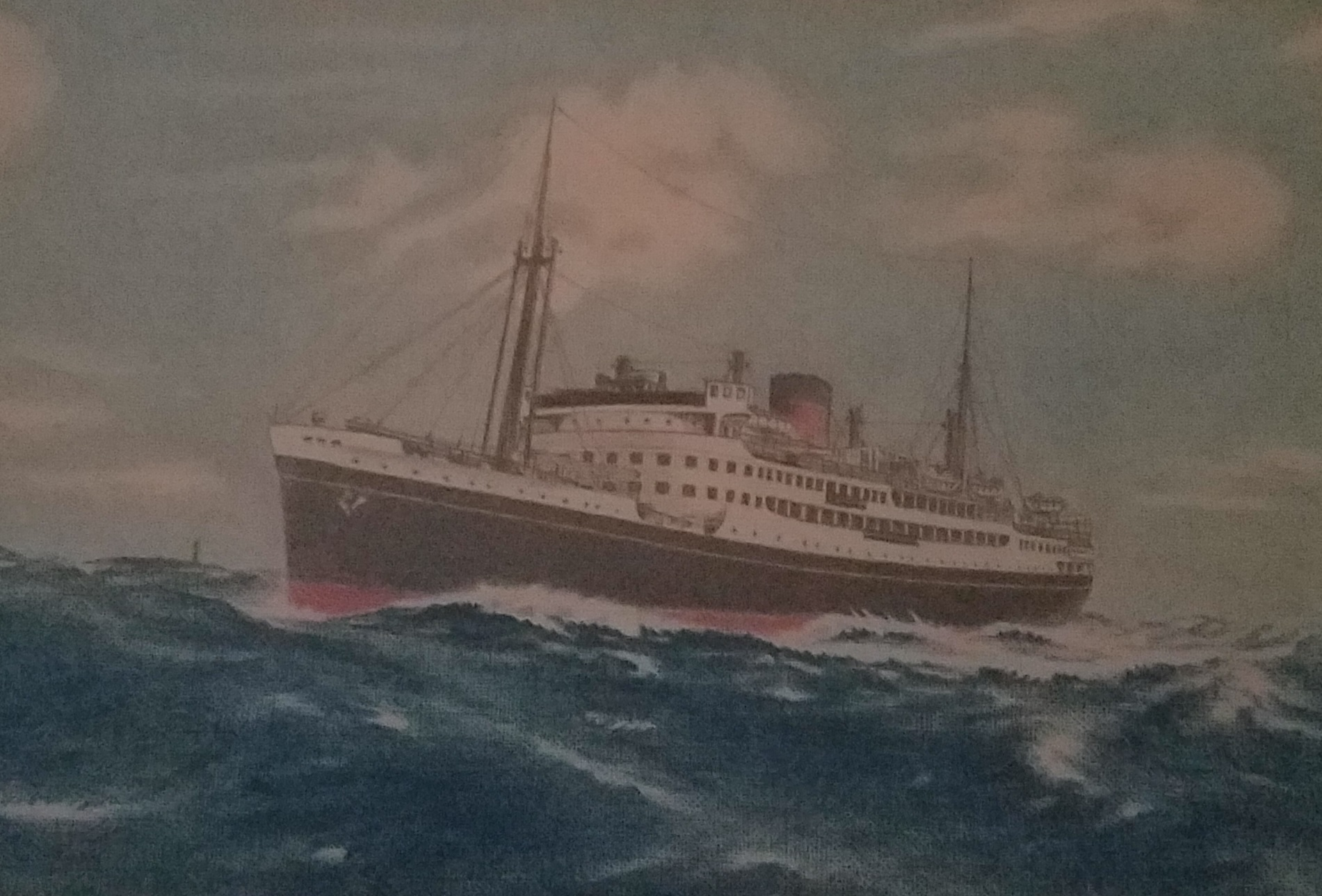
MV Kanimbla off Gabo Island in June 1937

The ship arrived in Melbourne 12 June 1936 and operated a passenger service between Cairns and Fremantle. The ship accommodated 203 first class and 198 cabin class passengers. This passenger service continued until the outbreak of World War II.

Kanimbla carried its own broadcast radio station (call sign 9MI), which broadcast programs to onshore listeners and other ships, as it passed along the coastline. It broadcast on short wave, but sometimes its programs were relayed by onshore medium wave stations. It was conducted entirely by Eileen Foley. It broadcast between 1936 and 1939.

=== World War II ===
Om 5 September 1939, Kanimbla was requisitioned for military service, and underwent conversion to an armed merchant cruiser at Garden Island in Sydney. She was commissioned into the Royal Navy as HMS Kanimbla, though with a largely Australian crew, on 6 September 1939. The ship was assigned the pennant number F23, although this was later changed to C78.

During 1940 and early 1941, Kanimbla was engaged in patrolling the coasts of Asia and boarding vessels of German or occupied Europe origin.

On 24 August 1941, as part of the Anglo-Soviet invasion of Iran, HMS Kanimbla carried an amphibious force that captured the port of Bandar Shahpur. She led seven other vessels, including the gunboat HMS Cockchafer, the corvette HMS Snapdragon, the naval trawler HMT Arthur Cavannagh, the sloop HMIS Lawrence, an oil rig tugboat, and a dhow. In addition, Kanimbla carried 300 Indian Army troops, including Gurkhas and soldiers from 3rd Battalion, 10th Baluch Regiment, whose task included securing the railhead, capturing eight Axis merchantmen (including the German cargo ship Hohenfels), two gunboats, and a floating dock. Kanimbla also provided artillery support with her deck guns.

On the night of 31 May 1942, Kanimbla was one of several Allied vessels located in Sydney Harbour, during the covert attack by Japanese midget submarines .

She arrived back in Sydney on 2 April 1943, was converted to a Landing Ship Infantry (LSI) and commissioned into the Royal Australian Navy as HMAS Kanimbla on 1 June 1943. She received the pennant number C78. In this configuration, she could carry 1,280 troops, and carried up to 22 LCVPs, plus two Landing Craft Mechanised.

The ship earned five battle honours for her wartime service: "New Guinea 1944", "Leyte Gulf 1944", "Lingayen Gulf 1945", "Borneo 1945", and "Pacific 1945".

=== Post-war ===
Kanimbla paid off at Sydney on 25 March 1949 and was returned to her owners on 13 December 1950 after being converted back by the Cockatoo Docks & Engineering Company with the ship subsequently bringing European migrants to Australia and later taking Australian tourists to Japan and other parts of Asia. In 1961, the ship was sold to the Pacific Transport Company and renamed Oriental Queen. For the next three years, the ship was chartered to transport pilgrims between Indonesia and Jeddah. In 1964, Oriental Queen was chartered by a Japanese shipping company and served as a liner on the Yokohama – Guam route. The vessel was later sold outright to the Japanese charterer. Oriental Queen's career ended in 1973, with the ship's sale to Taiwanese breakers for scrapping.

== Legacy ==
The suburb of Kanimbla in Cairns was named after the ship. In 1958 a container ship named kanimbla was launched by Bulkships.
