= John Spalvins =

John Spalvins, (born Jānis Gunnars Spalviņš, 1936) in Latvia, was Managing Director of the Adelaide Steamship Company from 1977 until the company's collapse in 1991. During this period under Spalvins' control, "Adsteam" became Australia's major corporate entity with interests and significant holdings in retailing, food, wine, dairy, hardware, building, banks, and numerous other companies. "Spalvins built up one of Australia's largest industrial conglomerates, which took in David Jones, Woolworths, Metro Meat, food company Petersville Sleigh, beer and wine company Tooth & Co, as well as a tugboat business, before it was put into receivership in 1991."

== Early career ==
Spalvins spent the first 13 years of his life in Latvia before his mother brought him to Australia.

In 1957, aged 21, he became company secretary of Camlec where he remained until 1973. During this period he studied economics in the evenings earning a degree from the University of Adelaide.

== The Adelaide Steamship Company ==
In 1973, Adelaide Steamship Company's managing director (and later chairman) Ken Russell head-hunted Spalvins to aid in revitalising the company. In 1977 Spalvins was appointed managing director, and in 1980 Spalvins and Russell commenced their acquisition and control of David Jones, followed through the 1980s by acquisition of numerous Australian "household names" including, but by no means limited to, Tooth & Co, (Penfolds, KB Lager, etc.), Petersville Sleigh, (Four’N Twenty pies, Bodalla Cheese, Pura Milk, Peters Ice Cream, Birds Eye frozen foods, Nanna's frozen apple pies, etc.), Farmers Union, Metro Meat, AWA, John Martin's, Pioneer Property Group and Woolworths.

== Retirement ==
Following the collapse of the Adsteam share price, in March 1991 it was announced that Spalvins "would be terminated as an Adsteam employee". He departed on 5 July 1991.

For many years, Spalvins and his second wife Gale divided their time between "Kintyre", their home in Springfield, South Australia, their villa on Hamilton Island, and their units in the United States. They continue to spend at least three months each year in the United States at their home in Sun Valley, Idaho, where he indulges his passion for skiing. He remains an active investor through his company Galufo Pty Ltd, and is prominent for his role in advocating the obligation of company boards to provide value for their smaller shareholders.

== Family ==
On 16 December 1961, Spalvins married Cecily Westall Rymill (b. 1939, d.14 April 1991). They had two sons.

After Cecily's unexpected death, aged 53, from a rare blood disease, Spalvins subsequently married Gale.
