= MV Kooringa =

Australian ship

Kooringa
History

Australia
- Name: Kooringa
- Namesake: Kooringa
- Owner: Associated Steamships and McIlwraith, McEacharn & Co
- Port of registry: Melbourne
- Builder: State Dockyard, Newcastle, New South Wales
- Yard number: 72
- Launched: 29 February 1964
- Completed: 17 May 1964
- Fate: Scrapped November 1992

General characteristics
- Type: Container ship
- Tonnage: 5,825 GRT; 6,753 DWT
- Length: 126.2 m (414 ft) LOA
- Beam: 19.1 m (63 ft)
- Speed: 16 knots (30 km/h; 18 mph)

MV Kooringa was the world's first fully cellular purpose-built container ship and was built by Australian company, Associated Steamships in partnership with McIlwraith, McEacharn & Co and commissioned in May 1964. It was built at the New South Wales State Dockyard in Newcastle as a "custom-designed cellular container ship to handle 20-ton containers".

The 6,750-ton ship was designed to handle 10,000 tons of containerised cargo in 36 hours by being loaded and unloaded simultaneously. It entered the Melbourne-Fremantle trade in 1964, arriving at Fremantle Harbour on 19 June that year. Two more purpose built container ships, MV Kanimbla and MV Manoora joined the regular service in 1969 and the three ships continued to operate until 1975 when competition from rail freight made the service non-viable.

The ship was named after the now closed mining town of Kooringa in South Australia.

== Another ship of the same name ==
A ship of the same name, the 339-ton SS Kooringa was built for the Yorke Peninsula Steamship Co in 1902 and ran mail, passenger and cargo between Port Adelaide and ports along the Yorke Peninsula and Kangaroo Island. Yorke Steamship Co. was ultimately taken over by Adelaide Steamship Company.
