= Walter Peeler =

Australian Victoria Cross recipient (1887–1968)

Walter Peeler VC, BEM
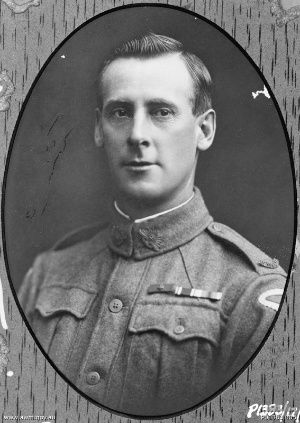
- Peeler c. 1920
- Born: 9 August 1887; Barker's Creek, Victoria
- Died: 23 May 1968 (aged 80); Caulfield South, Victoria
- Burial place: Brighton General Cemetery
- Military career
- Allegiance: Australia
- Branch: Australian Army
- Service years: 1916–1918; 1940–1945
- Rank: Warrant Officer Class II
- Conflicts: First World War; Western Front; Battle of Messines; Battle of Passchendaele; Battle of Broodseinde; Second World War; Syria–Lebanon campaign; Battle of Merdjayoun; Battle of Damour; Dutch East Indies campaign; Battle of Java; Battle of Leuwiliang
- Awards: Victoria Cross; British Empire Medal
- Other work: Custodian of the Shrine of Remembrance (1934–1964)

Walter Peeler, VC, BEM (9 August 1887 – 23 May 1968) was an Australian soldier and a recipient of the Victoria Cross, the highest award for gallantry "in the face of the enemy" that can be awarded to members of the British and Commonwealth armed forces. He was decorated following his actions during the Battle of Broodseinde in October 1917. Then a lance corporal in the Australian Imperial Force, he repeatedly took the lead in the 37th Battalion's advance on well-defended German positions, destroying four machine gun posts and killing more than 30 German soldiers during the battle.

Born near Castlemaine, Victoria, Peeler worked at various jobs in his home town and in the Melbourne area before enlisting in the Australian Imperial Force in February 1916. Posted to the 3rd Pioneer Battalion, he arrived on the Western Front during November. In June 1917, his battalion participated in the assault on Messines ridge, where he was lightly wounded. Eight days after his Victoria Cross action, Peeler was severely wounded in his right arm and spent the next seven months recuperating in the United Kingdom. Following the armistice with Germany, he was discharged from service with the rank of sergeant in December 1918.

Peeler re-settled with his family in Victoria, and was appointed the inaugural custodian of Melbourne's Shrine of Remembrance in 1934. In May 1940, Peeler enlisted for service in the Second World War, understating his age by fourteen years to avoid the upper age limit imposed on volunteers. He was posted to the 2/2nd Pioneer Battalion and initially saw action in the Syria–Lebanon campaign. However, with the entry of Japan into the war, his unit was one of the first sent to the Netherlands East Indies in early 1942. The unit arrived in Sumatra and was disembarking when it was diverted to Java where it assisted in the Dutch defence of the island. When Dutch resistance collapsed in March, allied forces in Java signed a formal surrender with British, Australian and American troops becoming prisoners of war. After three-and-a-half years as prisoner of war, Peeler was freed in August 1945 and returned to Australia in October, resuming his duties at the Shrine of Remembrance. He retired in 1964 and, aged 80, died at his home in South Caulfield in 1968.

== Early life ==
Walter "Wally" Peeler was born at Barker's Creek, near Castlemaine, Victoria, on 9 August 1887. He was the eighth child of William Peeler, a farmer and miner, and his English-born wife Mary Ellen (née Scott). As a youth Peeler worked in his parents' orchard, before gaining employment with Thompson's Foundry in Castlemaine. On 10 July 1907, he wed Emma Hewitt; the couple were to have five children. An active sportsman, Peeler was a member of the Castlemaine Cricket Club and, briefly, secretary of the Wesley Hill Football Club.

== First World War ==
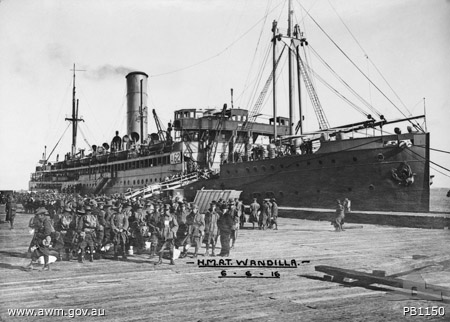
Soldiers of the Australian Imperial Force about to embark aboard HMAT Wandilla at Port Melbourne

By 1916, Peeler was living in the Melbourne suburb of Richmond with his wife and three daughters. On 17 February, he enlisted in the Australian Imperial Force for service in the First World War. Posted as a private soldier to the machine gun section of the 3rd Pioneer Battalion, Peeler underwent his initial training in Victoria, before departing from Melbourne headed for England aboard HMAT Wandilla on 6 June. The battalion arrived in Plymouth seven weeks later. During the three months Peeler's unit spent in England undergoing additional training, he was charged with being absent without leave for six hours on 3 July, and fined a day's pay. He was nevertheless promoted to lance corporal on 6 November.

Two weeks later, the 3rd Pioneer Battalion was posted to the Western Front. Sent to the Armentières sector, the battalion spent several months working on trench and railway construction. In mid-December, Peeler attended a week-long course at the Machine Gun School in Le Touquet, and in early 1917, accompanied the battalion north in preparation for the upcoming Messines offensive. However, on 8 May 1917, one month before the offensive, Peeler found himself the subject of a court-martial in the field. Following an incident that occurred during a training session on 26 April, he was charged with "careless and negligent handling of a Lewis Gun whilst instructing" that led to "grievous bodily injury" to Private John Martin Fife. Found guilty of the charge, Peeler was stripped of his lance corporal stripe.

On 7 June 1917, Peeler participated in the initial assault on Messines Ridge. Manning a Lewis gun during the action, he was injured twice, suffering shrapnel wounds to his face and eye from an artillery shell, and a gunshot wound to his right cheek. He spent three days in hospital before returning to his battalion. On 22 June, he was once again promoted to lance corporal. The 3rd Pioneer Battalion spent the next four months in a quieter section of the front.

=== Victoria Cross ===
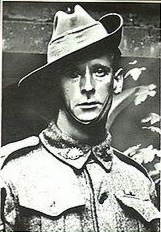
Sergeant Peeler c. 1918

As part of the third stage of General Sir Herbert Plumer's Passchendaele offensive, an attack against Broodseinde was scheduled for 4 October 1917. The 3rd Australian Division's 10th Australian Infantry Brigade was one of the assault formations charged with delivering the main blow, and ultimately with seizing the heavily defended Broodseinde Ridge. To provide defence against low-flying German aircraft during the attack, a group of 24 men, including Peeler, from the 3rd Pioneer Battalion's machine gun section were attached to the 10th Brigade's 37th Battalion.

The attack on Broodseinde began at 06:00 under the cover of an artillery barrage. Armed with a Lewis Gun, Peeler advanced with the initial wave. The Australians rapidly crossed the first 100 metres (110 yd) before becoming pinned down by a party of nine German soldiers, who were situated in a shellhole and sniping at the advancing troops. Firing his machine gun from the hip, Peeler dashed forward across the exposed ground and shot the group of Germans, "clearing the way for the advance". He performed similar feats on two subsequent occasions, killing several German soldiers and emerging unscathed.

The Australian force continued to press their assault, encountering pillboxes and machine gun positions as they pushed forward. One such machine gun position, situated in the open, held up the advance. Firing a single burst from his Lewis Gun, Peeler killed the gunner and caused the remainder of the gun's defenders to seek cover in a nearby dugout. One of the Australians then lobbed a "well aimed" grenade into the dugout, driving out ten soldiers whom Peeler then shot. Described as being "particularly prominent in the advance" by historian Charles Bean, Peeler "almost single-handedly" destroyed four German posts in an hour, accounting for more than 30 soldiers.

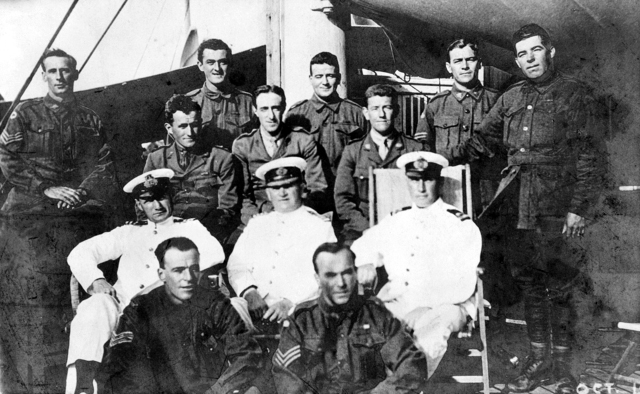
The group of ten Australian Victoria Cross recipients repatriated to Australia to assist in recruitment pictured on HMAT Medic with three naval officers. Peeler is standing at left.

By 07:15 the following morning, the 37th Battalion had captured its objective, having seized eight pillboxes, several concrete dugouts, 20 machine guns and 420 prisoners. Two hours later, the Australians were in possession of Broodseinde Ridge. For his actions during the battle, Peeler was awarded the Victoria Cross; one of two Australians to be so decorated that day. On 12 October, eight days after Peeler's actions, the men of the 10th Brigade returned to the front line in an effort to exploit the success of the previous week. The ground in front of their position was dominated by a series of German pillboxes and had been turned into a quagmire by heavy rain. The brigade's attack was soon subject to a "torrent of machine gun fire", and Peeler was severely wounded in his right arm. Initially evacuated to the 11th Australian Field Ambulance casualty station, it was decided that his wound necessitated treatment in England so he embarked for the Northampton War Hospital on 15 October, arriving the following day.

While recuperating in England, the announcement and accompanying citation for Peeler's Victoria Cross was promulgated in a supplement to the London Gazette on 26 November 1917, reading:

War Office, 26th November, 1917.

His Majesty the KING has been graciously pleased to approve of the award of the Victoria Cross to the undermentioned Officer, Non-commissioned Officers and Men: —

No. 114 L./Cpl. Walter Peeler, Aus. Imp. Force.

For most conspicuous bravery when with a Lewis gun accompanying the first wave of the assault he encountered an enemy party sniping the advancing troops from a shell-hole.

L./Cpl. Peeler immediately rushed the position and accounted for nine of the enemy, and cleared the way for the advance. On two subsequent occasions he performed similar acts of valour, and each time accounted for a number of the enemy.

During operations he was directed to a position from which an enemy machine gun was being fired on our troops. He located and killed the gunner, and the remainder of the enemy party ran into a dugout close by. From this shelter they were dislodged by a bomb, and ten of the enemy ran out. These he disposed of.

This non-commissioned officer actually accounted for over thirty of the enemy.

He displayed an absolute fearlessness in making his way ahead of the first wave of the assault, and the fine example which he set ensured the success of the attack against most determined opposition.

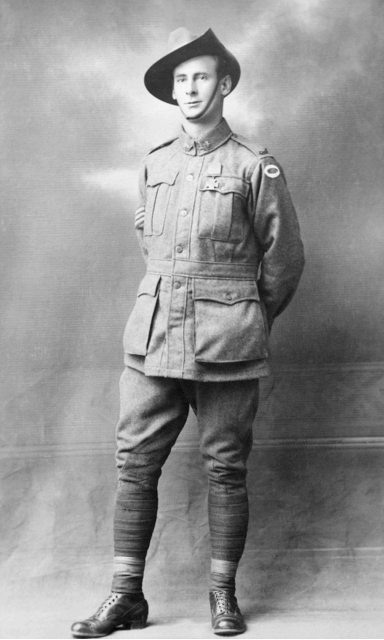
Studio portrait of Sergeant Walter Peeler c. 1918

=== Recuperation and repatriation ===
As news of Peeler's decoration spread, it prompted a "wave of celebrations" in his hometown of Castlemaine; flags flew in his honour, and one of his daughters was cheered by fellow pupils at her school. On 8 January 1918, Peeler was formally conferred with his Victoria Cross by King George V in an investiture ceremony at Buckingham Palace. Having sufficiently recovered from his wound, Peeler rejoined the 3rd Pioneer Battalion in France on 17 May; he was promoted to temporary corporal two weeks later.

On 22 June 1918, Peeler was posted to the Corps Gas School for eight days. He was promoted to sergeant on 30 July. Around this time, Australian Prime Minister Billy Hughes invited Australia's Victoria Cross recipients of the war to return to Australia and assist in a recruiting drive. Among the group who accepted the offer, Peeler was one of ten who embarked for Melbourne aboard HMAT Medic on 24 August, arriving in Melbourne seven weeks later. He would not return to France; on 11 November 1918 an armistice with Germany was declared, effectively ending the war. Peeler was discharged from the Australian Imperial Force on 10 December.

== Inter-war years ==
Following his discharge, Peeler gained employment with the soldier-settler branch of the Victorian Department of Lands. He remained with the department for six years, before acquiring an orchard in the Castlemaine district. However, this venture proved short-lived and he soon returned with his family to Melbourne, joining the H.V. McKay Sunshine Harvester Works at Sunshine. Also on the company's staff was a fellow Victoria Cross recipient, Dominic McCarthy. When Melbourne's Shrine of Remembrance was completed in 1934, Peeler was appointed as the memorial's first custodian. He occupied this post for next 30 years, coming to regard the Shrine as "his second home".

== Second World War ==
=== Enlistment and Syrian Campaign ===
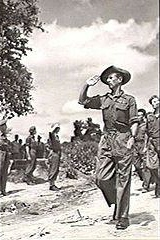
Warrant Officer Peeler leads his company of ex-prisoners of war in the salute of Major Green, Commanding Officer of 2/4th Machine Gun Battalion.

On 27 May 1940, Peeler enlisted in the Second Australian Imperial Force for service in the Second World War, giving his date of birth on his enlistment forms as 9 August 1901, thus understating his age by fourteen years. At 52, Peeler was twelve years over the maximum age limit, although he later claimed he was not the "oldest fellow in my unit". Granted the acting rank of sergeant, he was allotted to the newly raised 2/2nd Pioneer Battalion. The battalion completed its initial training at Puckapunyal, during which time Peeler was made acting staff sergeant and Company Quartermaster Sergeant of D Company on 1 August.

On 7 April 1941, the 2/2nd Pioneer Battalion embarked aboard HMT Queen Mary at Sydney, bound for the Middle East; Peeler's rank of staff sergeant was confirmed as substantive on the same day. After just under four weeks at sea, the troopship disembarked at Port Tewfik in Suez, where the battalion entrained for Palestine. There it was attached to the 7th Division in support of the Syrian campaign against Vichy French forces.

The 2/2nd Pioneer Battalion was initially divided up, with each company attached to a different brigade of the 7th Division. Peeler's D Company—assigned to the 25th Brigade—was originally tasked with the maintenance and general repair of the road network in its locality. However, when the Vichy French launched a counter-attack on 15 June, the battalion was concentrated in the Merdjayoun area in an effort to prevent any further French gains. On the night of 27 June, after a costly assault against the Vichy French at Merdjayoun earlier that day, Peeler led out a patrol to recover the wounded. Four soldiers were discovered and brought back to the Australian lines. Despite suffering heavy casualties in Syria, the 2/2nd Pioneer Battalion served throughout the campaign, including participation in the decisive Battle of Damour in July.

After the Vichy French defeat in Syria, the 2/2nd Pioneer Battalion was relocated to Tripoli, Lebanon where it headquartered itself in an olive grove while carrying out training and garrison duties over the next four months. During November, the battalion was moved to Qatana in Syria, but with the entry of Japan into the war in late 1941, the 1st Australian Corps including the 6th and 7th Divisions were directed to move to the Netherlands East Indies for service in the Pacific theatre. In January 1942, Peeler was among the men of the 2/2nd Pioneer Battalion who embarked aboard HMT Orcades for Sumatra but later diverted to Java. He was promoted to Warrant Officer Class II during this time.

=== Defence of Java and prisoner of war ===
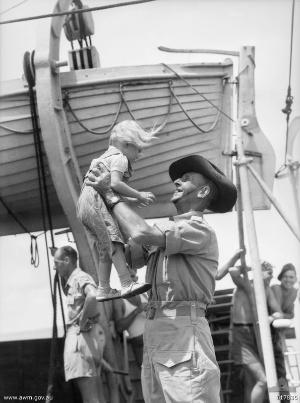
Peeler playing with three-year-old Ferne Pope on the deck of HMS Highland Brigade during his journey back to Australia, after three years as a prisoner of war

The 1st Australian Corps with the 6th and 7th Division were moving from the Middle East to Dutch East Indies. Sailing far ahead of the 7th Division ships, the fast liner Orcades with 3400 men including the 2/2nd Pioneer Battalion without its heavy equipment, reached Sumatra at midday of 15 February. Orcades was disembarking troops just hours before the fall of Singapore when ordered to reembark troops and divert from Sumatra to Batavia in Java. Disembarking at Batavia on 18 February, Peeler's battalion was combined with the other units aboard Orcades to form Blackforce. This ad hoc grouping, under the command of fellow Victoria Cross holder Brigadier Arthur Blackburn, was tasked with defending a series of airfields and supporting the Dutch. Blackburn organised his men into a brigade formation, consisting of a headquarters and three infantry battalions—the men of the 2/2nd Pioneers made up the bulk of Blackforce's 2nd Battalion.

On 28 February 1942, elements of the Imperial Japanese Army landed on Java. Blackforce was stationed at Buitenzorg, poised to advance west to confront the invaders. However, rapid Japanese progress pushed the defending Dutch forces in the opposite direction, and Blackforce was assigned the defence of Buitenzorg and Leuwiliang. As the situation deteriorated further, Blackburn was forced to withdraw his men east on the night of 4/5 March, and again on 7/8 March. On 8 March, the Dutch surrendered, ordering all men to lay down their arms. With supplies running low and unable to contact the Australian Government, Brigadier Blackburn announced the surrender of Blackforce four days later. Peeler and his fellow soldiers thus became prisoners of war. At the time, he was one of three Australian Victoria Cross recipients of the First World War serving overseas, all of whom were "swept up in the Japanese advance"; Blackburn surrendered with Peeler at Java, while Walter Brown was caught up in the fall of Singapore, where he is believed to have been killed attempting to evade capture.

Peeler was among a contingent of Australian captives transported to work on the Burma Railway. Despite the "harsh treatment" meted out by the Japanese, he later played down his ordeal, stating: "I wasn't treated too badly, apart from nearly starving ... But what the Japs did to the others on the railway was pretty horrifying". After three-and-a-half years incarceration, he was freed following the Japanese capitulation in August 1945 and the subsequent liberation of prisoner-of-war camps in the Pacific. On 6 October, Peeler embarked for Australia aboard HMS Highland Brigade; he arrived in Melbourne fifteen days later. Back in Australia, he learned that his son, Donald, by his second marriage, had been killed in action on the island of Bougainville on 31 December 1944, while serving with the 15th Battalion. Donald Peeler was posthumously mentioned in dispatches for his "distinguished service in the South-West Pacific Area". Warrant Officer Class II Walter Peeler was discharged from the Second Australian Imperial Force on 12 December 1945.

== Later life and legacy ==
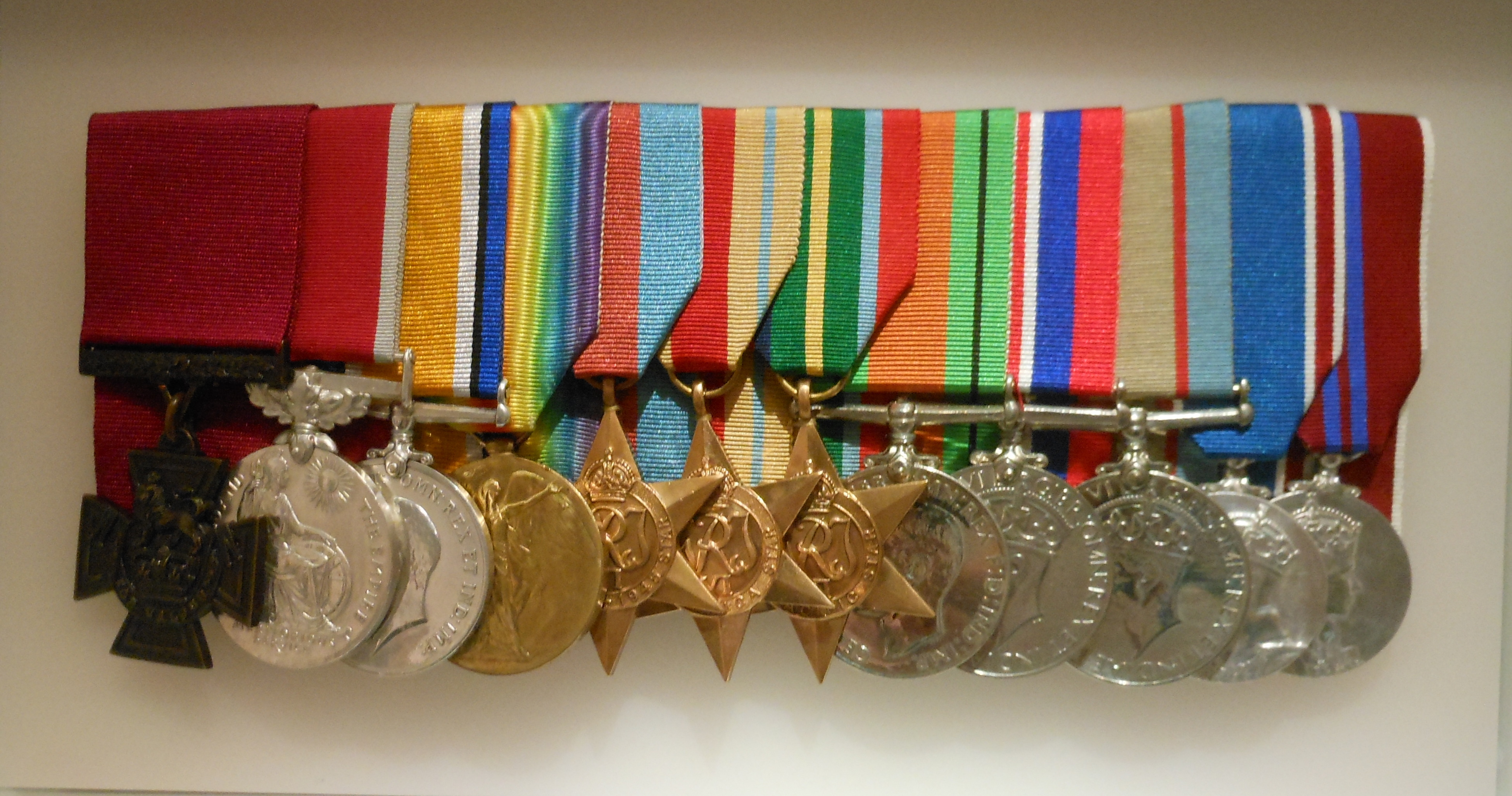
Walter Peeler's medals at the Australian War Memorial, Canberra

Peeler resumed his duties as custodian of the Shrine of Remembrance on his discharge, guiding visitors around the memorial. In the 1961 Queen's Birthday Honours, his "long and dedicated service" at the Shrine was recognised with the award of the British Empire Medal. He retired three years later at the age of 76, stating: "It's time I had a rest." In 1966, Peeler was interviewed for a newspaper article; when queried on his Victoria Cross exploit, he recalled:

My wartime experiences are nothing to make a splash about ... I'm just an ex-soldier who did his job. I never saw the faces of those I killed. They were just men in an enemy uniform. It was simply them or me. I don't think I was brave—not any more than the other Aussies who were with me. I simply had a job to do and I did it ... Only afterwards did I realise how lucky I'd been not to get killed myself.

— Walter Peeler

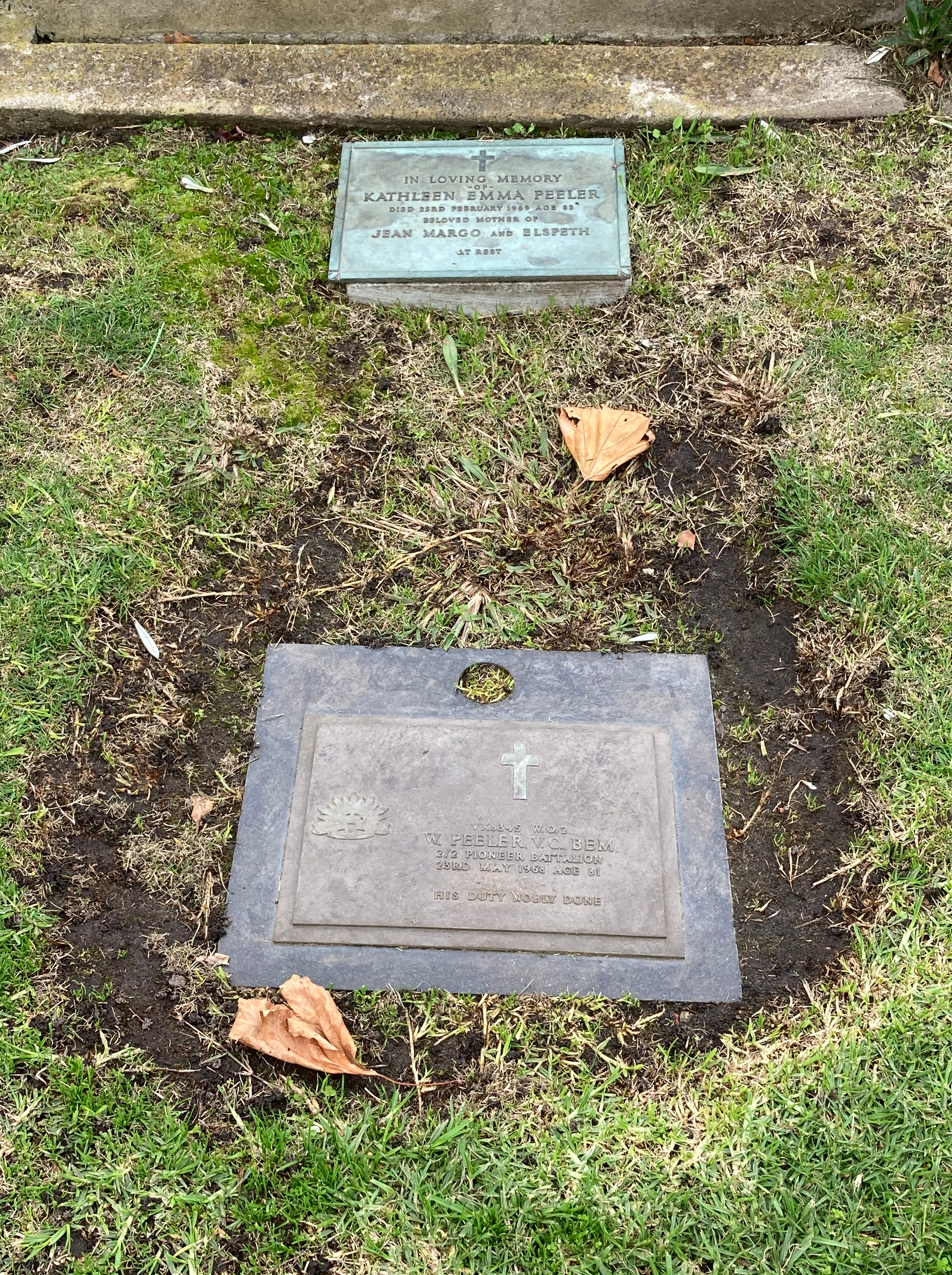
Peeler's grave at Brighton General Cemetery

Peeler died at his home in South Caulfield, Victoria, on 23 May 1968. Survived by his second wife, Kathleen, and his four remaining children, he was buried in Brighton Cemetery. Kathleen died the following year. Peeler is commemorated in the Victorian Garden of Remembrance, and a soldiers' club in Casula, New South Wales, bears his name. His Victoria Cross and other medals are on display in the Hall of Valour at the Australian War Memorial in Canberra.
