= Fred Peters =

Fred Peters may refer to:

- Fred Peters (politician), American politician
- Fred Peters (artist) (1923–2018), American animator and comics artist
- Fred Peters (businessman) (1866–1937), American businessman
- Fred Peters (discus thrower) (born 1933), American discus thrower, 1957 NCAA runner-up for the Stanford Cardinal track and field team

== See also ==
- Frederick Peters (disambiguation)
