= 3rd Pioneer Battalion (Australia) =

Australian infantry and light engineer unit

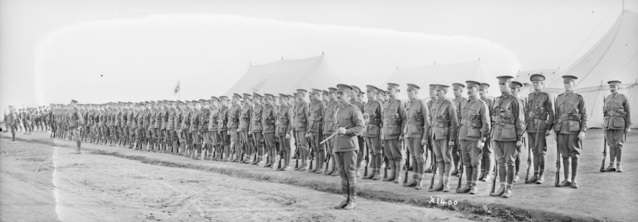
- 3rd Pioneers on parade at Campbellfield, May 1916
- Active: 1916–1919
- Country: Australia
- Branch: Australian Army
- Role: Pioneer
- Size: Battalion
- Part of: 3rd Division
- Colours: Purple and white
- Engagements: First World War: Western Front

Insignia
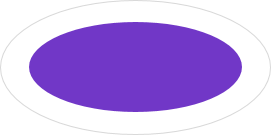
- Unit colour patch

The 3rd Pioneer Battalion was an Australian infantry and light engineer unit raised for service during the First World War as part of the all volunteer Australian Imperial Force (AIF). Formed in Victoria in March 1916, the battalion subsequently undertook further training in the United Kingdom before arriving in France in late 1916. It later served on the Western Front in France and Belgium until the end of the war. Assigned to the 3rd Division, the 3rd Pioneer Battalion fought in most of the major battles that the AIF participated in between mid-1916 and the end of the war in November 1918. It was subsequently disbanded in early 1919.

== History ==
=== Formation and training ===
The 3rd Pioneers were raised in Victoria, in March 1916, from volunteers drawn from Victoria, Queensland, South Australia, and Western Australia and was subsequently assigned to the 3rd Division. The battalion was formed in the aftermath of the failed Gallipoli campaign when the Australian Imperial Force (AIF) was expanded as part of plans to transfer it from the Middle East to Europe for service in the trenches along the Western Front. This expansion saw several new infantry divisions raised in Egypt and Australia, as well as specialist support units such as machine gun companies, engineer companies, artillery batteries and pioneer battalions.

Trained as infantrymen, the pioneers were tasked with light combat engineer functions in the field, with a large number of personnel possessing trades from civilian life. The concept had existed within the British Indian Army before the war, but was adopted by the Australian Army in early 1916 to meet a need for troops with construction and engineering skills to assist with digging trenches, labouring, constructing strong points and undertaking battlefield clearance. As such, they were designated as pioneer units. At the same time, they could be pressed into the line to fight alongside regular infantry where required.

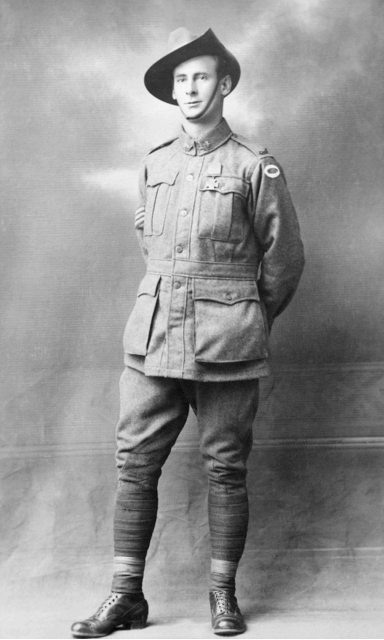
Walter Peeler, the 3rd Pioneers' sole Victoria Cross recipient

A total of five pioneer battalions were raised by the AIF during the war, with one being assigned to each of the five infantry divisions that the Australians deployed to the battlefield in France and Belgium. The battalions consisted of four companies, under a headquarters company. To identify the 3rd Pioneer Battalion's personnel, they were issued with a purple and white unit colour patch. The colours were in common with other Australian pioneer battalions, while the horizontal oval shape denoted that the unit was part of the 3rd Division.

The battalion's first commanding officer was Lieutenant Colonel Robert Law, and upon establishment it was decided that the unit would be an "all States" unit, meaning that personnel would not just be drawn exclusively from one particular state, but would instead draw recruits from all around Australia. The headquarters and 'A' Company were recruited from Victoria, and was established at Ascot Vale, before moving to Campbellfield in March, while 'B' Company was composed of New South Welshmen, 'C' Company came from Queensland and 'D' Company was a composite sub-unit drawn from South Australia and Western Australia. After the sub-units had formed in their home locations – Liverpool, Bathurst, Brisbane, Blackboy Hill, and Adelaide – the battalion began concentrating at Campbellfield in April 1916.

Detailed training began at Campbellfield shortly after concentration and in May the battalion marched through the streets of Melbourne, before being presented with its unit colour. They were subsequently laid up at St Paul's Cathedral in Melbourne prior to embarkation. They departed Australia on the transport Wandilla on 6 June 1916, and endured a seven-week voyage to the United Kingdom, sailing via Cape Town. After arriving in the United Kingdom, the battalion subsequently concentrated with the rest of the 3rd Division around Larkhill on Salisbury Plain, in Wiltshire. Between July and November 1916, the 3rd Pioneers carried out intensive training to prepare them for their arrival on the Western Front. Finally, on 25 November the battalion entrained at Amesbury bound for Southampton from where they were ferried across the English Channel to Le Havre.

=== Western Front ===
The 3rd Pioneers would subsequently serve on the Western Front from late 1916 until the end of the war. After a brief period of acclimatisation in a "nursery sector" around Armentieres, the battalion's first major action came around Messines in June 1917, during which several of the battalion's companies were assigned to the assaulting companies to dig communication trenches while other troops were assigned general engineering duties such as road clearance, tramway maintenance, anti-aircraft defence and water supply, laying pipes and ensuring that they were maintained throughout the battle. Following this, the battalion's next major battle of 1917 was the Third Battle of Ypres, before moving back to Wavrans in late October 1917. One member of the battalion, Lance Corporal Walter Peeler, received the Victoria Cross, for his bravery during the Battle of Broodseinde in October 1917. During the action, Peeler was part of a Lewis Gun team that was supporting the 37th Infantry Battalion; tasked with providing anti-aircraft defence, when the first wave of the assault was held up, Peeler advanced ahead of the assaulting infantry and destroyed one of the German positions that was causing heavy casualties. He then proceeded to destroy a machine gun position.

The battalion wintered around Messines, during which time it provided reinforcements to the Australian engineer tunneling companies, as well as helping to construct and maintain the divisional tramway systems. In early 1918, the battalion took part in efforts to blunt the German spring offensive, serving around Belle, Heilly and Ribemont between March and May 1918. In the lull that followed the failed German offensive, the Allies sought to regain the initiative, and after being relieved by the 2nd Pioneers around Heilly, the 3rd Pioneers were dispatched to the Somme, taking over from the 4th Pioneers around Villers-Bretonneux. They then took part in the Battle of Hamel before joining the Hundred Days Offensive, which was launched around Amiens in August 1918. It was during the August offensive that the 3rd Pioneers went into action as infantry for the first time, doing so on 22 August 1918. The battalion's final actions of the war came against the Hindenburg Line, around the St. Quentin Canal in early October 1918, during which a company of Americans from the US 102nd Engineers were attached to them. The battalion was subsequently withdrawn from the line for reorganisation along with the rest of the Australian Corps after the battle around the St. Quentin Canal, and moved back to the Abbeville area. They did not see further action before the armistice came into effect on 11 November 1918.

Of the five Australian pioneer battalions, it spent the longest period of time in the infantry role, spending more days in combat, standing-to and in the line than any of the others. After the conclusion of hostilities, the battalion's strength dwindled as personnel were sent to England and elsewhere for educational courses to prepare them to return to civilian life. The first batch of around 100 personnel left for Australia for demobilisation in February 1919, and the battalion was formally disbanded the following month. During the war, a total of 1,964 men served in the 3rd Pioneer Battalion; this includes the original enlistments and eight batches of reinforcements. Of these, 140 were killed or died of wounds, 19 died from illness or from accident, 208 were gassed, and 619 were wounded in action. Including Peeler's VC, a total of 129 honours and awards were bestowed upon members of the battalion: one VC, four Distinguished Service Orders, 16 Military Crosses, 10 Distinguished Conduct Medals, 73 Military Medals, nine Meritorious Service Medals, and three Mentions in Despatches. In addition, three members of the battalion were invested as Members of the Order of the British Empire and one was appointed as an Officer of the Order of the British Empire.

== Legacy ==
Within the AIF, according to historian William Westerman, the pioneer battalion concept was not "effectively employed by Australian commanders". In this regard, Westerman argues that the AIF pioneer battalions were rigidly utilized as either engineers or infantry, instead of "integrating those two functions". Additionally, while he argues that they were under utilised in their infantry roles, and that the amount of time that was spent training as infantry and the resources consumed was disproportionate for the amount of time they spent in the line undertaking infantry tasks. While some battalions, including the 3rd Pioneers, undertook successful infantry actions, units such the 1st and 4th Pioneers never saw action directly in their infantry role. Additionally, the units' separation from the field engineers resulted in "administrative, organisational and command and control problems" which even limited their utility as engineering formations.

After the war, the concept of pioneer battalions was discontinued in the Australian Army. In the immediate aftermath of the war, as plans were drawn up for the shape of the post conflict Army, a proposal was put forth to raise six pioneer battalions in the peacetime Army, but a combination of global disarmament and financial hardship resulted in this plan being scrapped. As a result, pioneer battalions disappeared from the Australian Army order of battle until the Second World War, when four such battalions were raised as part of the Second Australian Imperial Force. According to Alexander Rodger, as a result of the decision not to re-raise pioneer battalions in the interwar years, no battle honours were subsequently awarded to the 3rd Pioneer Battalion – or any other First World War pioneer battalion – as there was no equivalent unit to perpetuate the honours when they were promulgated by the Australian Army in 1927.

== Commanding officers ==
The battalion was commanded by the following officers:

- Lieutenant Colonel R. Law (1916–1917)
- Lieutenant Colonel L.F.S. Mather (1917–1918)
- Lieutenant Colonel H. Grant (1918)
- Lieutenant Colonel W.H. Sanday (1918)
