= Frederick Peters (disambiguation) =

Frederick Peters (1851–1919) was a Canadian lawyer and politician.

Frederick Peters may also refer to:

- Frederick Adam Peters (born 1979), American football executive
- Frederick Emerson Peters (1885–1959), American fraudster
- Frederic Thornton Peters (1889–1942), his son, Canadian recipient of the Victoria Cross
- Frederick Peters (actor) (1884–1963), American film actor
- F. Whitten Peters (born 1946), District of Columbia lawyer and public official

== See also ==
- Fred Peters (disambiguation)
