= Peters Ice Cream =

Australian ice cream brand

- Company type: Subsidiary
- Founded: 1907
- Founder: Fred Peters
- Headquarters: Victoria, Australia
- Parent: Froneri
- Website: www.peters.com.au

Peters Ice Cream is an Australian ice cream brand, now a subsidiary of European food firm Froneri. It was originally developed in Sydney by American businessman Fred Peters in 1907, using his mother's recipe.

== History ==
Peters was established by Fred Peters in 1907 in Paddington, New South Wales as the Peters' American Delicacy Company. Business flourished and in 1923 a new manufacturing plant was built in Redfern. In 1927, Peters then established an associated sister company Peters' Arctic Delicacy Co. Ltd in Brisbane, with a branch located in Newcastle. In 1929, Peters further expanded when associated companies were established in Victoria, Western Australia and Townsville, with a new manufacturing plant in Rockhampton.

Peters was largely responsible for introducing to Australia the small refrigerated cabinet, which he hired out to retailers. The red and cream corporate identity was adopted in New South Wales and Queensland, whilst green and cream were used in Victoria and Western Australia.

By the 1960s all ice cream production for the Peters brand, with the exception of Peters Western Australia which owned and operated its own separate factory, was handled by the Melbourne-based Petersville Australia Limited.

In the late 1980s, the non-Western Australian Peters businesses were taken over by the Adelaide Steamship Company (AdSteam) and were then acquired by Pacific Dunlop (now known as Ansell) upon AdSteam's collapse. In the mid-1990s, Pacific Dunlop sold its ice cream division as Peters to Nestlé.

The separate Peters Western Australia business was owned by Peters and Brownes Foods, which was acquired by Fonterra in 2006. In 2009 Fonterra sold Peters and Brownes Foods to Nestlé, giving Nestlé nationwide control of the Peters brand.

In 2012, the consolidated Peters was purchased from Nestlé by Pacific Equity Partners, with the Australian licence to produce sub-brands that were retained by Nestlé, e.g., Drumstick. In May 2014, Pacific Equity Partners sold Peters to the European company R&R Ice Cream.

On April 19, 2018, R&R Ice Cream merged with Nestlé's ice cream business to form Froneri, which became the corporate parent of Peters.

== Gallery ==
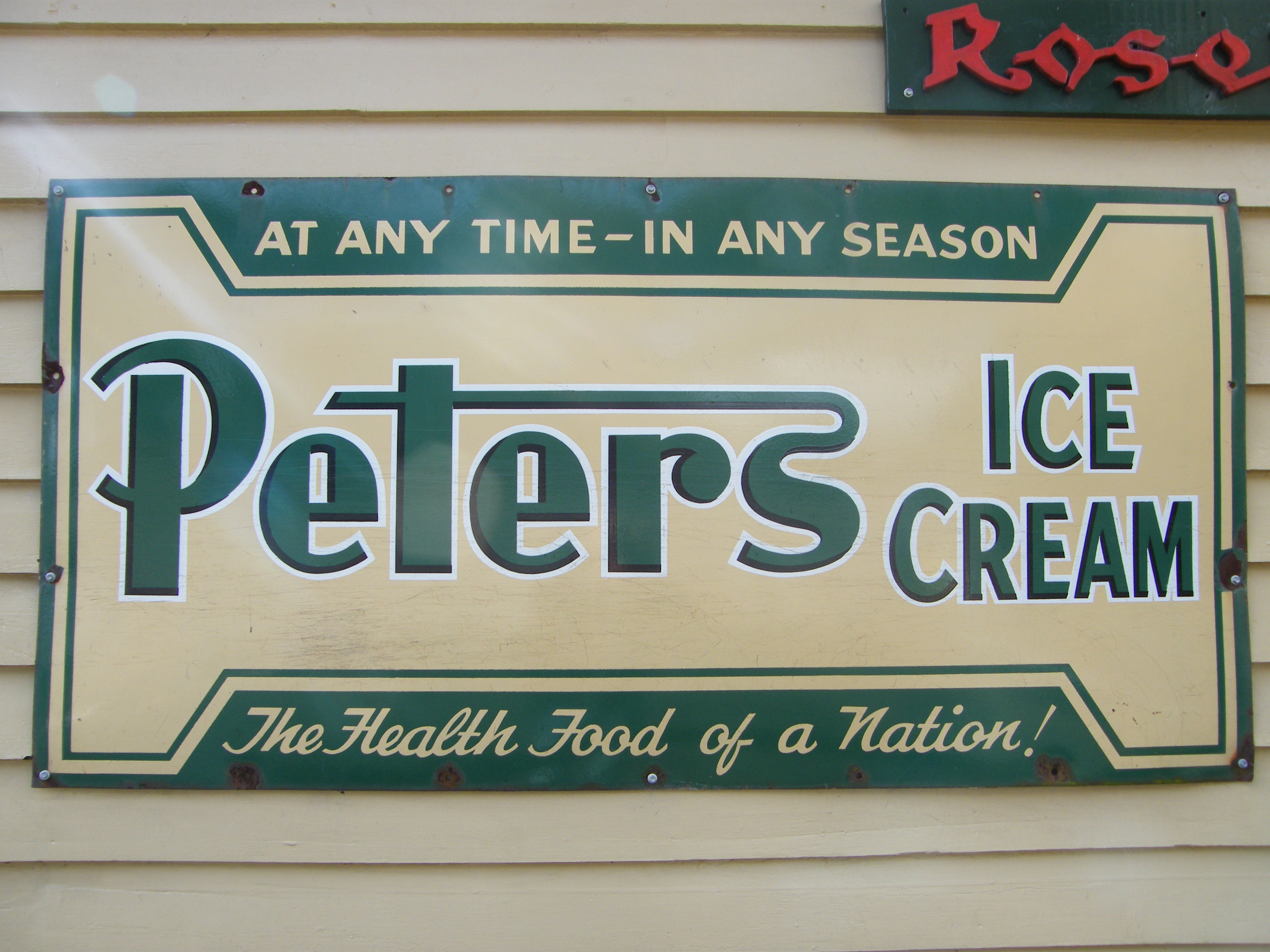
Old advertisement on the side of the former Narracan General Store at Old Gippstown, Moe

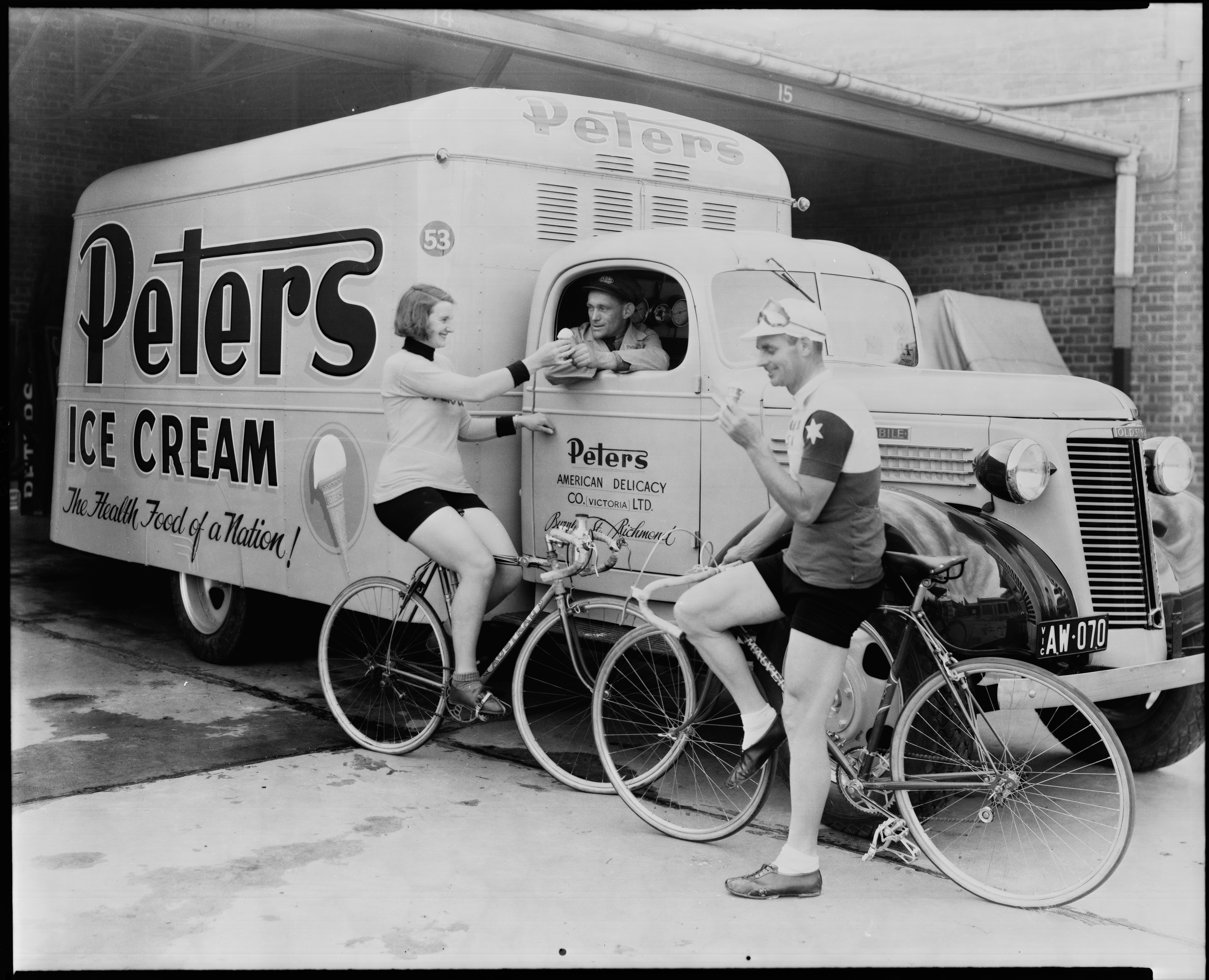
Advertisement for Peters Ice Cream from 1939 featuring Valda Unthank and Hubert Opperman.

== See also ==
- Michelides Tobacco Factory, a building which was for a while the Peters Ice Cream factory in Perth, Western Australia.
- Zig and Zag (Australian performers), a clown duo who advertised Peters Ice Cream
