= HMAT Wandilla =

Sometimes referred to as SS Fort St. George

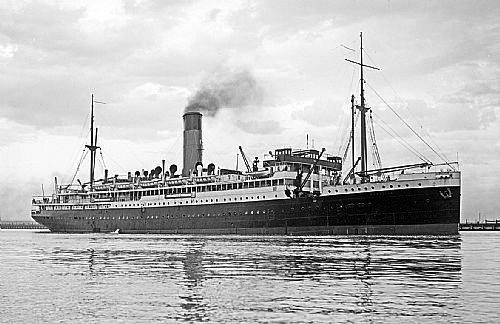
- SS Wandilla

History
- Name: Wandilla (1912–1921); Fort St. George (1921–1935); Cesarea (1935–1938); Arno (1938–1940)
- Owner: Adelaide Steamship Company (1912–1921); Bermuda & West Indies SS Company (1921–1935); Lloyd Triestino (1935–1940)
- Builder: William Beardmore and Company, Glasgow
- Yard number: 506
- Launched: 25 May 1912

Australia
- Name: Wandilla
- Operator: Australian Army
- In service: 1915
- Out of service: 1918
- Fate: Returned to owners in 1918.

Italy
- Name: Arno
- In service: 1940
- Fate: Sunk 40 miles off Ras el Tin after being torpedoed on 10 September 1942.

General characteristics
- Tonnage: 7,785 gross register tons; 4,532 net register tons
- Length: 411 feet 3 inches (125.35 m)
- Beam: 56 feet 7 inches (17.25 m)
- Draught: 34 feet 1 inch (10.39 m)
- Installed power: 626 nhp on 6 coal-fired boilers
- Propulsion: Twin quadruple expansion engines
- Speed: 16.36 knots (30.30 km/h; 18.83 mph) maximum; 14.5 knots (26.9 km/h; 16.7 mph) normal

SS Wandilla was a steamship built in 1912 for the Adelaide Steamship Company. The ship operated on the Fremantle to Sydney run until 1915, when she was acquired for military service and redesignated HMAT Wandilla. Initially used as a troop transport, the vessel was converted to a hospital ship in 1916. Wandilla was returned to her owners at the end of the war, then was sold to the Bermuda & West Indies SS Company and renamed Fort St. George in 1921. She was sold in 1935 to Lloyd Triestino and renamed Cesarea before being renamed Arno in 1938. At the start of World War II, the ship was acquired by the Regia Marina for use as a hospital ship. She was sunk by British aircraft on 10 September 1942.

== Design and construction ==
The ship was built in 1912, by William Beardmore and Company, Glasgow, together with her sister ships SS Warilda and SS Willochra.

== Operational history ==
She was used on the Fremantle to Sydney passenger-cargo service until May 1915. After the start of World War I, Wandilla was one of several Adelaide Steamship Company vessels requisitioned for military service. The ship was initially used as a troop transport under the designation His Majesty's Australian Transport (HMAT) Wandilla, and delivered Australian soldiers to Europe. In July 1916, the vessel was converted into a hospital ship. While serving as a hospital ship, she was torpedoed by a U-boat in February 1918, although the torpedo failed to explode. Wandilla was crewed by Australian officers and (during part of her service) Australian sailors. Commonwealth control ended 24 January 1917.

After being returned to her owners in 1919, she continued plying the coastal passenger-cargo service until 1921; Adelaide Steamship Company felt that there was no future in coastal passenger services, and Wandilla was sold to the Bermuda & West Indies SS Company and renamed Fort St. George. She was modified by replacing her cargo holds with water tanks to supply fresh water to the hotels in Bermuda. She was also modified to accommodate 380 first class and 50 second class passengers. She collided with White Star Line's RMS Olympic in 1924 while in New York City, and was out of service for a period of time for repairs. She was sold in 1935 to Lloyd Triestino, Trieste and renamed Cesarea before being renamed Arno in 1938.

== Fate ==
The Arno was requisitioned as a hospital ship by the Regia Marina during World War II. The ship and its crew members were featured in the 1941 Italian propaganda film The White Ship (Italian: La nave bianca). The Arno was sunk by aerial torpedoes from the Royal Air Force on 10 September 1942 at 33°14′N 23°23′E, about 40 miles (64 km) north-east of Ras el Tin, near Tobruk. It has been alleged that a German radio message decoded on 31 August 1942 showed that the ship was being used to carry supplies to Benghazi in violation of the Hague Convention, making the sinking a justified attack. However, as noted by lawyer Alfred-Maurice de Zayas in his 1979 work The Wehrmacht War Crimes Bureau, 1939–1945, the Wehrmacht War Crimes Bureau identified the sinking of the Wandilla was a war crime.

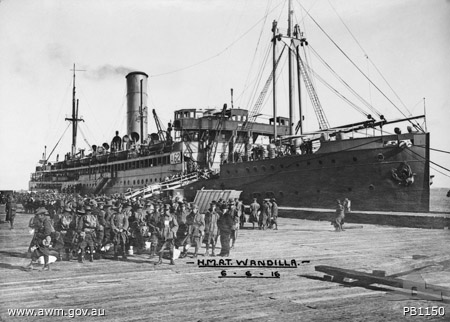
The diggers of the 3rd Pioneer Battalion prepare to board HMAT Wandilla at Port Melbourne, bound for the Western Front. 6 June 1916
