= RMS Fort Victoria =

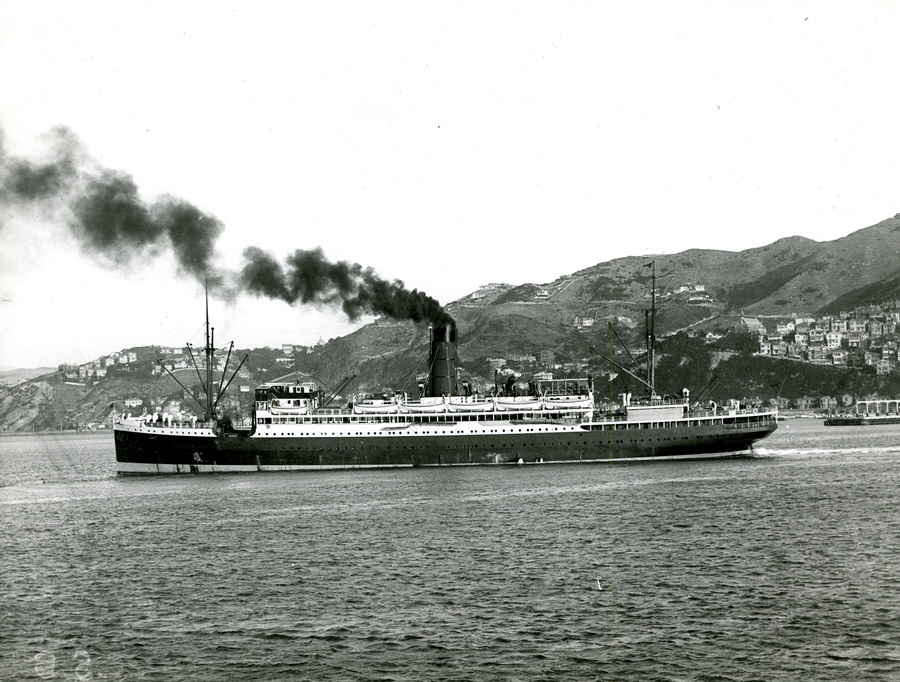
- The ship as Willochra

History
- Name: Willochra (1912–19); Fort Victoria (1919–29)
- Owner: Adelaide Steamship Co (1912–19); Furness, Withy & Co (1919–29)
- Operator: Adelaide Steamship Co (1912–13); Union Steamship Company of New Zealand (1913–15); Adelaide Steamship Co (1915–19); Quebec Steamship Co (1920–21); Bermuda & West Indies Steamship Co (1921–29)
- Port of registry: Port Adelaide (1912–19); Montreal (1920–21); Hamilton (1921–29)
- Route: United States – Australia – New Zealand (1912–19)
- Builder: William Beardmore & Company, Dalmuir
- Yard number: 507
- Launched: 14 August 1912
- Completed: 7 February 1913
- Out of service: 18 December 1929
- Identification: UK official number 122744; code letters JBPH
- Fate: Sunk by collision

General characteristics
- Type: passenger ship
- Tonnage: 7,784 GRT, 4,532 NRT
- Length: 411.7 ft (125.5 m)
- Beam: 56.7 ft (17.3 m)
- Depth: 34.1 ft (10.4 m)
- Decks: 2
- Installed power: 762 NHP
- Propulsion: 2 × screws; 2 × quadruple expansion engines
- Speed: 16 knots (30 km/h)

Fort Victoria was a 7,784 GRT passenger steamship that was built in 1912 as Willochra. During the First World War she was requisitioned for use as a troopship. In 1920 she was sold and renamed Fort Victoria, serving until lost in a collision in 1929.

== History ==
William Beardmore & Co Ltd built the ship at Dalmuir, West Dunbartonshire as yard number 507. She was launched as Willochra on 14 August 1912 and completed on 7 February 1913 for the Adelaide Steamship Company. Her identical sister ships, also built by William Beardmore and Company, were Warilda (1911) and Wandilla (1912).

In 1913, Willochra was chartered by the Union Steamship Company of New Zealand. In November 1914, Willochra was requisitioned, as a troopship making numerous journeys with reinforcements to the war, notably Egypt, and returning with wounded. In 1918 she was requisitioned by the UK for transatlantic duties and painted in dazzle camouflage. At the end if the war she repatriated German prisoners to Europe.

In 1919, Willochra was sold to Furness Withy. She was refitted and renamed Fort Victoria. Initially, she was operated by the Quebec Steamship Company, Montreal but in 1921 she was transferred to the Bermuda & West Indies Steamship Co, Hamilton, Bermuda. Both companies were owned by Furness Withy. On 18 December 1929, Fort Victoria sailed from New York Harbor for Hamilton with just over 200 passengers on board. The weather at the time was dense fog, and Fort Victoria stopped to await an improvement in conditions. While anchored, she was hit by the Clyde-Mallory Line's Algonquin, a liner which was on a voyage from Galveston, Texas to New York. Algonquin cut into the port side of Fort Victoria. Distress calls were made by both ships, which were answered by the United States Coast Guard and other ships in the area. All on board Fort Victoria were rescued before the ship sank later that day. The position of the wreck is 40°28′27″N 73°53′13″W. To replace Fort Victoria, a contract was given to Vickers-Armstrong's to build SS New Australia, which entered service in 1933.

== Description ==
The ship was a 7,714 GRT cruise ship. She was 411 feet 7 inches (125.45 m) long with a beam of 56 feet 7 inches (17.25 m). She had two screws, each driven by a quadruple expansion engine. The combined power of her twin engines was rated at 762 NHP, and gave her a speed of 16 knots (30 km/h). As Fort Victoria she was fitted up for 400 first class passengers, and had no accommodation for other classes.

== Model ==
A boardroom model of Willochra is in the possession of the Newport Harbor Nautical Museum, Newport Beach, California.
