= Bulkships =

Australian shipping company

- Industry: Shipping
- Founded: 1958
- Founder: Adelaide Steamship Company; Howard Smith; McIlwraith, McEacharn & Co
- Area served: Australia

Bulkships was an Australian shipping company.

== History ==
Bulkships was founded in 1958 by the Adelaide Steamship Company, Howard Smith and McIlwraith, McEacharn & Co as a bulk carrier operator. By 1968, Adelaide Steamship Company and McIlwraith, McEacharn & Co each owned 50%.

In August 1970, TNT purchased a one-third shareholding. By 1972, it owned a 25% shareholding in RW Miller. In February 1977, TNT bought out Adelaide Steamship Company taking its shareholding to 63% with McIlwraith, McEacharn & Co owning 37% with the business rebranded TNT Bulkships.
