= Fred Peters (businessman) =

- Born: 12 July 1866; Scio, Michigan, U.S.
- Died: 14 May 1937 (aged 64); Strathfield, New South Wales, Australia
- Education: Dexter High School (Michigan)
- Occupation: Businessman
- Spouse(s): Daisy Stephen (m. 1897; died 1929) Mildred Mallard (m. 1929; died 1931) Hilda Hogberg (m. 1931; died 1935) Theodora Pitkethly (m. 1936)

Frederick Augustus Peters (12 July 1866 – 14 May 1937) was an American businessman who founded the Peters Ice Cream brand, one of Australia's largest ice cream manufacturers during the 20th century.

== Early life ==
Peters was born on 12 July 1866 in Scio, Michigan. He was the son of Jannette (née Jacobs) and George Augustus Peters. His father was a farmer and miller.

Peters was educated at Dexter High School outside of Scio. After leaving school he worked for a Boston-based drug manufacturer. He later worked as the general sales manager of the Union Manufacturing Company in Toledo, Ohio, from 1892 to 1896.

== Career in Australia ==
Peters first visited Australia as a result of his part-ownership of a New York-based bicycle manufacturing firm which exported to Australia. He took up residence in Sydney in 1899, where he initially worked as an agent of the Union Manufacturing Company and later began developing his own ventures, including a patent medicine for piles.

In 1907, Peters established Peters' American Delicacy Co. Ltd to manufacture ice cream, which was not yet mass-produced in Australia. The company was initially based in rented rooms at an ice factory in Paddington.

By the time of his death, Peters was "the largest ice cream business in the British Empire" according to The Sydney Morning Herald, with eight factories across all Australian states except Tasmania and over 1,000 employees.

== Personal life ==
Peters was married four times and was widowed three times. His Australian estate was valued for probate at £56,400 (equivalent to $5,900,000 in 2022).
