= Adelaide Steamship Company =

Australian shipping company

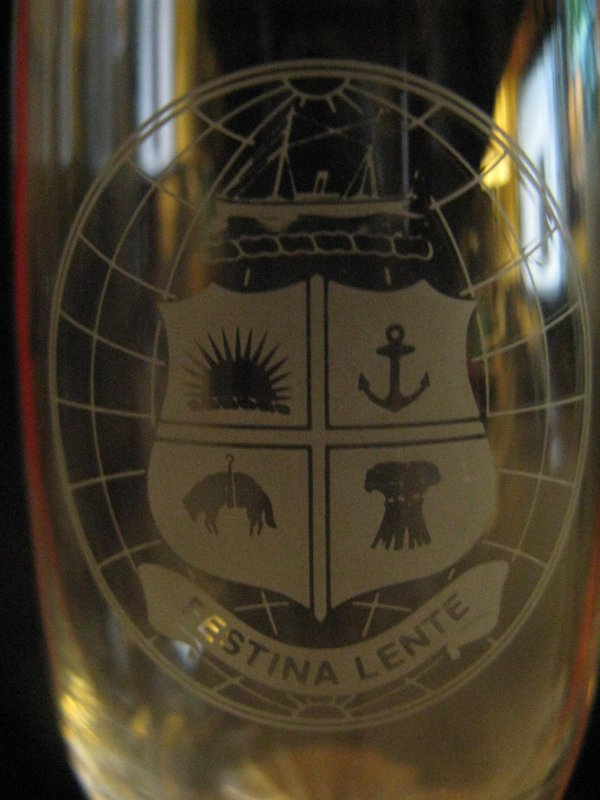
- Company coat of arms

- Company House flag
- Industry: Cargo
- Founded: September 1875
- Defunct: 2006
- Successor: Maersk Line
- Headquarters: Adelaide
- Area served: Australia

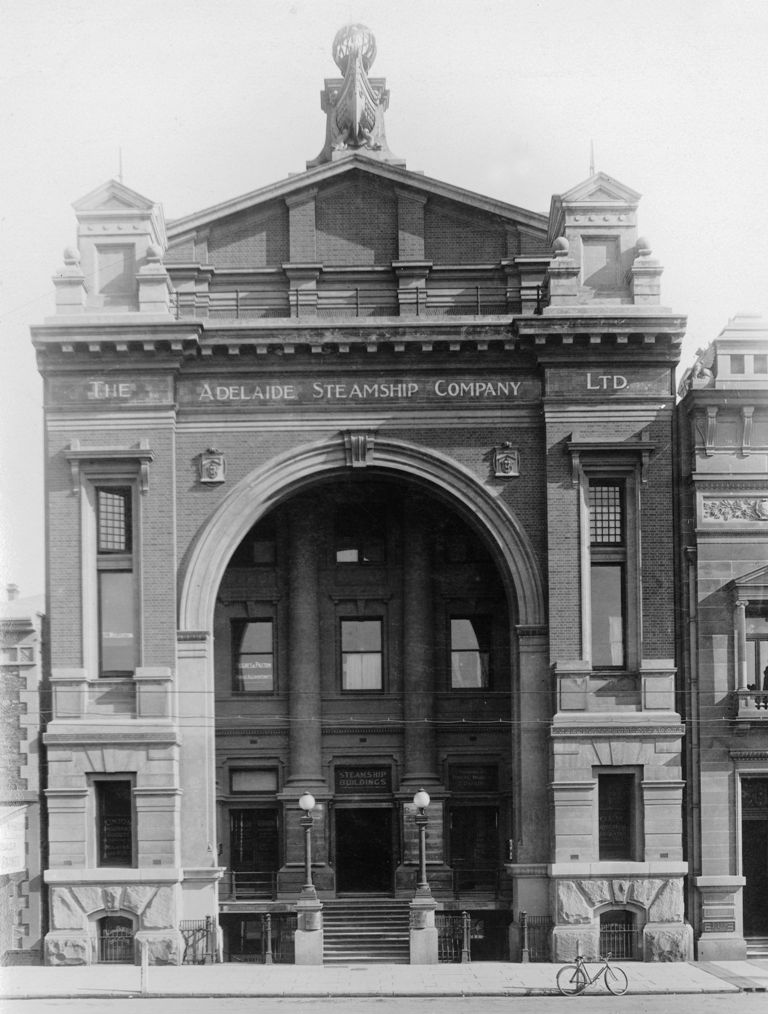
Adelaide Steamship Company building, Currie Street, Adelaide in 1917 (built 1903, dem. 1986)

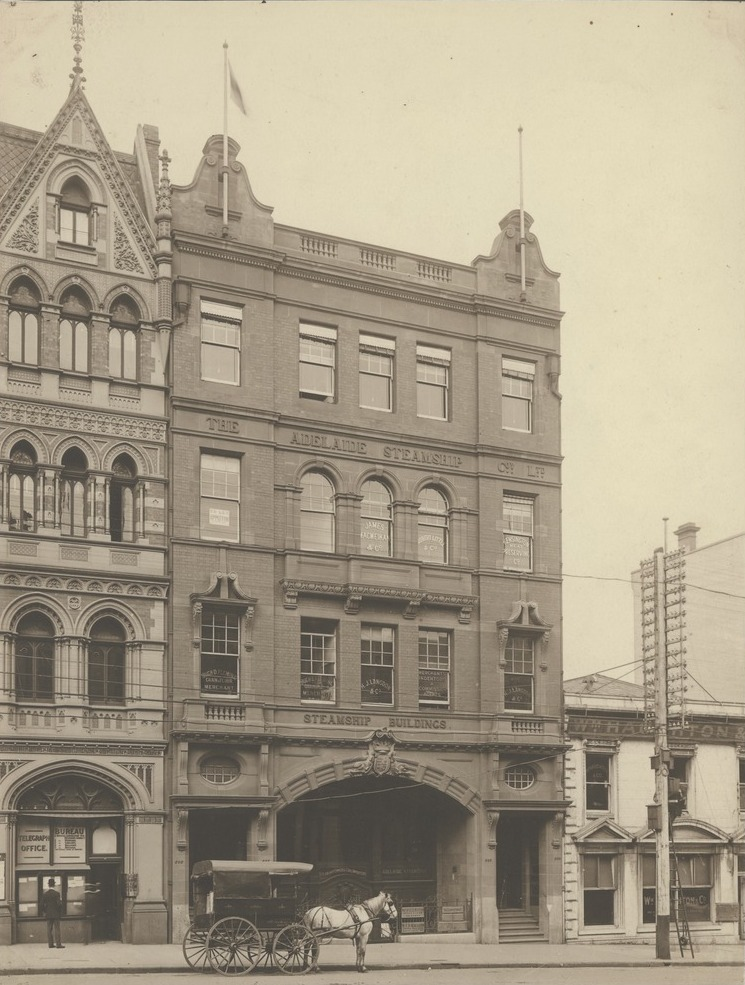
The Adelaide Steamship Company Charles D'Ebro designed building in Melbourne during the early 1900s

The Adelaide Steamship Company was an Australian shipping company, later a diversified industrial and logistics conglomerate. It was formed by a group of South Australian businessmen in 1875. Their aim was to control the transport of goods between Adelaide and Melbourne and profit from the need for an efficient and comfortable passenger service. For its first 100 years, the company's main activities were conventional shipping operations on the Australian coast, primary products, consumer cargoes and extensive passenger services.

In the 1930s and 1940s, the company diversified into the airline operations, towage, shipbuilding, and the shipping of salt, coal and sugar. Adelaide Airways was formed in 1935, and purchased West Australian Airways before merging with Holyman's Airways to form Australian National Airways (ANA) in 1936. ANA was sold to Ansett Transport Industries in 1957.

In 1964, the interstate fleet merged with McIlwraith, McEacharn & Co, and the partnership developed the world's first purpose-built container ships. In 1973, the company ceased its shipbuilding operations, and in 1977, in its 103rd year of operation, sold its shipping-related businesses and ceased its connection with ship owning and operating. It did, however, retain its interests in tugboat operations.

In the 1970s and 1980s, with John Spalvins at the helm, the company became a corporate raider with a portfolio financed by huge borrowings. The recession of the early 1990s caused lenders, over 200 banks, to demand the return of their assets. This forced the liquidation of the portfolio.

With the completion of the liquidation, on 30 April 1997 the company was renamed Residual Assco Group Limited in order that the Adelaide Steamship name could be reused. Residual Assco was delisted on 24 December 1999. In June 1997, the tug boat operations were floated on the Australian Securities Exchange under the name Adsteam Marine. In 2001, Adsteam Marine acquired its joint venture partner (and major rival as the premier Australian towage operator), Howard Smith. Adsteam Marine became the largest towage operator in Australia and the United Kingdom, with further extensive operations in the South Pacific. In 2006, Adsteam Marine was acquired as the Pacific arm of the world's largest shipping company, AP Moeller-Maersk, thus removing the Adelaide Steamship name from the Australian Stock Exchange and Australian Company registers.

== Steamships ==
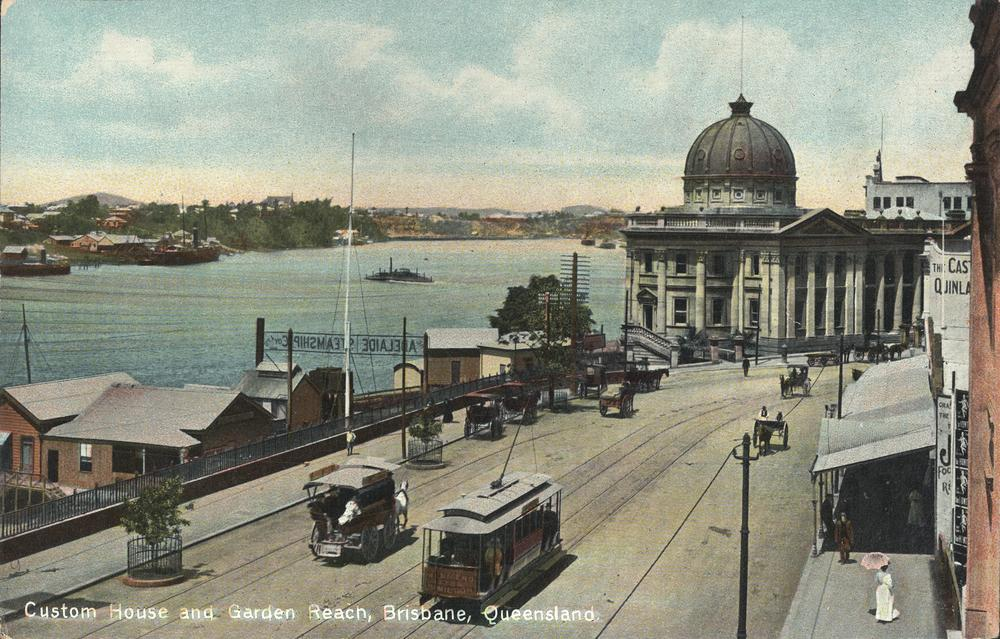
The Adelaide Steamship Company wharf in Brisbane during the early 1900s

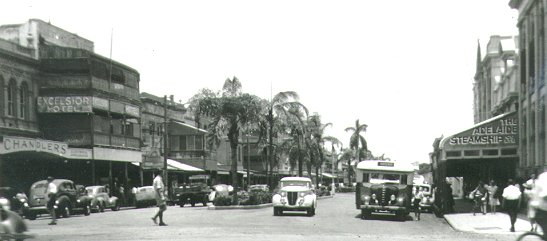
The Adelaide Steamship Company office in Townsville c. 1940

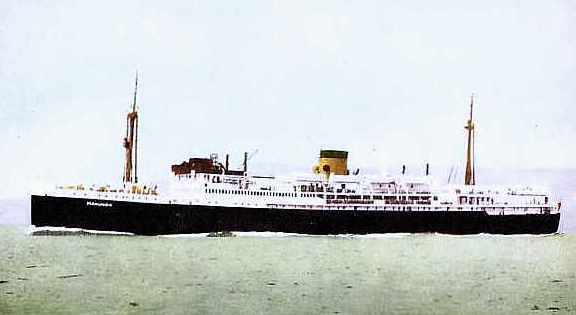
TSMV Manunda c. 1930 in Adelaide Steamship livery (buff funnel with black band at top)

The company was formed in September 1875 in Adelaide, South Australia, by a group of pastoralists and businessmen, some of whom already had steamship interests in the Spencer Gulf, namely Federal Wharf Co. Ltd, Port Adelaide Dredging Company Ltd, and Spencer Gulf Shipping Co. Ltd, and was incorporated on 8 October 1875.

Its promoters and founding directors included Andrew Tennant, Robert Barr Smith and Thomas Elder of Elder Smith & Co Ltd. The first ship of the new company was Flinders. In July 1876 the company's leading promoters amalgamated their private ship-owning interests to form the Spencer's Gulf Steamship Co Ltd, trading in South Australian coastal waters. The two companies amalgamated in December 1882. The fleet circled the coast from Derby in northern Western Australia to Cairns in northern Queensland. Shipping operations were supported by a large network of agency offices in almost every major Australian port.

During World War I, several Adelaide Steamship Company ships were requisitioned, as were several other privately owned ships; Grantala and Warilda as hospital ships and Wandilla and Fort Victoria as troopships. Yankalilla and Echunga were also commandeered.

Adelaide Steamship Company was liquidated and reconstructed twice for more efficient and profitable operation, first in 1900 and subsequently in 1920. On 20 January 1915 they took over Coast Steamships Limited, and kept it running as a subsidiary that retained its own identity until 1968.

By the start of World War II, the company owned 30 ships. With World War II, the company was again forced to surrender nine ships to the Navy, including Manoora and Manunda which became an Armed Merchant Cruiser and a hospital ship. Manunda was in Darwin harbour during the Japanese bombing and was able to bring 260 military and civilian casualties to safety in Fremantle. During the war she carried about 30,000 sick and wounded back to Australia from the Middle East and New Guinea. During the 1940s, a decline in trade necessitated the company to diversify and they began to acquire interests in other companies and projects. Consequently, after the war, the company diversified into towage, shipbuilding, and the shipping of salt, coal and sugar.

On 1 January 1964, its interstate fleet was merged with that of McIlwraith, McEacharn & Co in a new company, Associated Steamships Limited, in which Adelaide Steamship Company held 40%. Also in 1964, the merged company developed the world's first purpose built container ship, MV Kooringa. Bulkships, in which Adelaide Steamship held a 40% interest in 1965, acquired all the shares in Associated Steamship Limited in 1968. In 1977 the company's interest in Bulkships was disposed of and Adelaide Steamship Company ceased its connection with ship owning and operating. The company did, however, retain its interests in Tug boats and Tug boat operations and by the late 1980s, Adelaide Steamship was one of Australia's oldest surviving industrial companies.

=== Ships ===
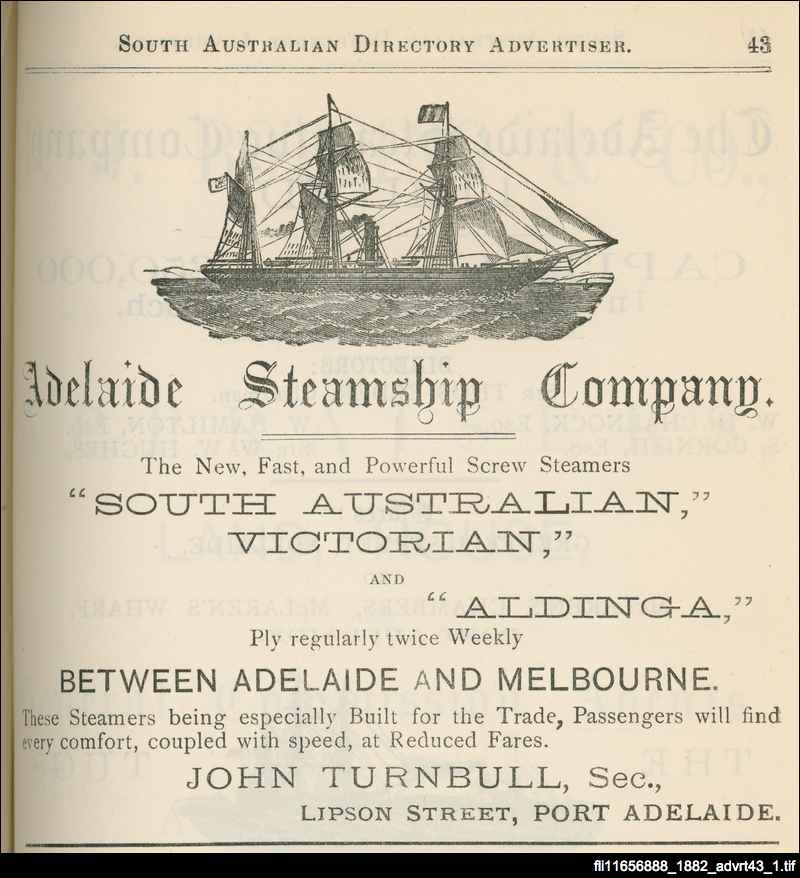
An 1882 Adelaide newspaper advertisement for the Company

Ships owned and operated by Adelaide Steamship Company included:

- Argosy Lemal, later Booya (ship)
- SS Beltana
- HMAS Bungaree
- SS Camira Built 1894 as SS Clan Campbell
- SS Cantara Built 1894 as SS Clan Ross
- SS Ceduna Built 1894 as SS Clan Mackay
- SS Ferret
- MV Kooringa
- SS Koombana
- HMAS Manoora (1935)
- TSMV Manunda
- MV Minnipa
- MV Moonta
- SS Paringa
- Polly Woodside (1922–1953)
- SS Warilda, later HMAT Warilda
- SS Willochra, later RMS Fort Victoria
- SS Yongala

== Aeroplanes ==
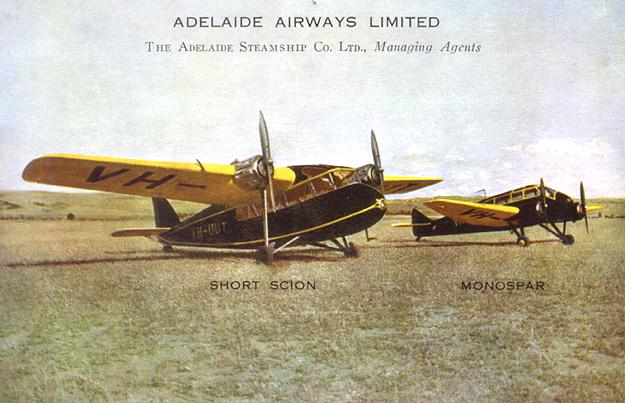
1935 Short Scion & Monospar

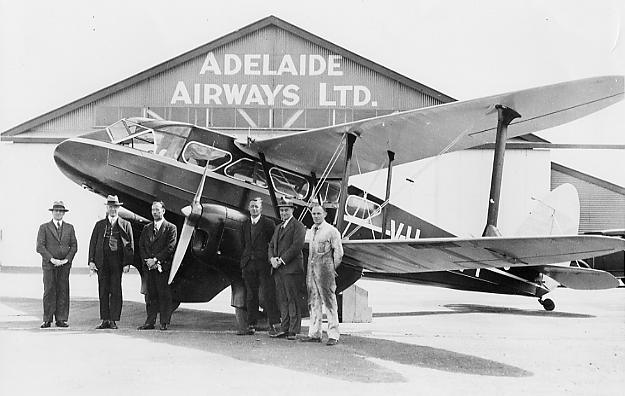
1936 De Havilland DH.89A

Adelaide Airways was formed as a subsidiary of the Adelaide Steamship Company on 3 July 1935 and commenced operations on 29 October. It had a number of different types of aircraft in its fleet, including the Short Scion, the General Aircraft Monospar ST-25, and the De Havilland DH.89A.

On 12 June 1936, Adelaide Airways purchased West Australian Airways for £25,000. Ivan Nello Holyman (of Holyman's Airways Pty Ltd) approached AdSteam with a view to an amalgamation, aiming to form Australia's most powerful airline which would effectively control airline traffic between Perth, Adelaide, Melbourne and Sydney. On 12 June 1936 the two companies merged and, on 2 November 1936 with Orient Steam Navigation Company and Union Steam Ship Company of New Zealand, formed Australian National Airways (ANA), "the pre- and post-war giant among Australian domestic airlines". AdSteam retained partial ownership in ANA until Holyman's death in 1957. The ANA board then unsuccessfully attempted to sell out to the Government owned Trans Australia Airlines, before reaching agreement with Reg Ansett to sell the airline to him for £3.3 million. ANA and Ansett Airways merged to form Ansett-ANA on 3 October 1957.

== Shipbuilding ==
Adelaide Ship Construction was set up as a subsidiary of the Adelaide Steamship Company in 1957, and was incorporated in July 1957. At the same time it was issued with the sole Australian licence for the hydroconic hull design patented by Burness, Corlett & Partners of the United Kingdom. This hull design for tugs gave them greater bollard pull from a given horsepower. Adelaide Ship Construction had been set up especially to address the issue of Australia's ageing fleet of tugs. The yard was built on the historic Fletcher's slip site at Birkenhead.

The keel for the first tug was laid 20 May 1958 and it was launched 12 February 1959. The shipyard site grew from two acres and one berth to four berths and 6½ acres in 1968, and to cater for vessels up to 425 feet long. At this time it employed more than 1,000 men. Adelaide Ship Construction had also acquired from Burness, Corlett and Partners the licence for their 'Towmaster' patent. Coupled with the Hydroconic hull design this enabled ever greater pull in its tugs. Hamersley Comet, built in 1968 had a bollard pull of 34.1 tons, the strongest to that time.

However, by 1973 the yard was running at a loss of $3.4 million, and it closed in August of that year. Its last ship was Cape York.

== Tug boat operations ==
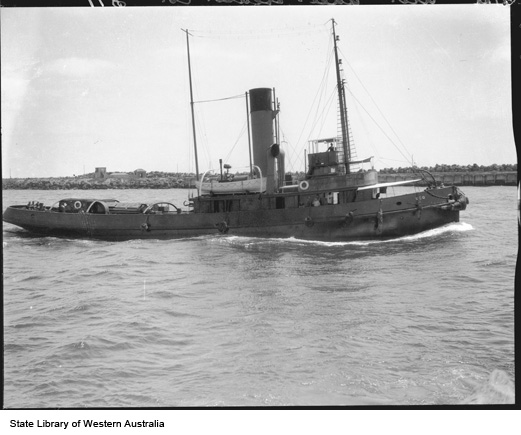
The Adelaide Steamship Company vessel ST Uco in Fremantle Harbour c. 1929

A relatively minor sideline, started in the 1890s, was the company's tug boat operations. Gradually, tug boat operations extended over a number of ports, but until the middle of the 20th century they remained the poor relation of the more significant coastal shipping operations. With the decline of coastal shipping however, towage assumed more importance. By the 1960s, towage and associated operations represented a very significant part of the company's activities.

In 1977 the company's interest in Bulkships was disposed of, and Adelaide Steamship Company ceased its connection with ship owning and operating. It had diversified into investment and property ownership, vineyard and wine production, optical goods manufacturing and distribution, engineering, share investment, and, until 1973, shipbuilding. Thus towage and associated operations continued to have prominence, even during the 1970s and 1980s when the Adelaide Steamship Company became the foundation for one the country's major conglomerate organisations.

AdSteam Marine logo

As this activity was happening, towage began to reassert itself as an important element of the company; From 1993 it exhibited a period of aggressive growth until the company had a fleet of 156 tug boats, and operated in over 40 Australian, Indian, Pacific Oceana and British ports. Strengthened by a series of industry rationalisations – Brambles' Port Kembla, Sydney and Newcastle operations and P&O's towage operations in Western Australia – the towage division became a valuable candidate for asset disposal. In April 1997 the company changed its name to Residual Assco Group Limited and in June 1997 floated its marine division which was registered on the Australian Securities Exchange as Adsteam Marine Limited.

Once it became a publicly listed company in its own right, Adsteam Marine established a strong investor following. In addition to towage, the company developed shipping agency and tug barging activities. Adsteam Marine doubled its size in May 2001 when it acquired the towage interests of Howard Smith, its partner in many towage ventures, for more than $500 million, making it the largest towage operator in Australia and the United Kingdom, together with operations in Papua New Guinea and Fiji. Other activities included barge operations in the United States, and ships agency services throughout Australia, New Zealand and India.

In 2006, it was acquired by AP Moeller-Maersk.

== The corporate raider ==
After becoming chief executive of the Adelaide Steamship Company in 1977, John Spalvins built up one of Australia's largest industrial conglomerates and became one of the most feared takeover specialists in corporate Australia. Spalvins transformed himself into an entrepreneur, using vast amounts of debt to launch a series of massive takeovers. Adsteam "aggressively acquired significant shareholdings in a variety of companies in a number of fields including retailing, hotels, leisure industries and civil engineering." "Adsteam's share price rose dramatically through much of the 1980s and it was hailed by some commentators as being entrepreneurial, well managed and with a highly disciplined reporting system."

At its height, the Adsteam group included Woolworths, David Jones, Tooth & Co, Petersville Sleigh, Farmers Union, Metro Meat, a stable of premium wineries and many others. Also, at various stages, it held a 15% stake in Westpac, a 20% stake in Bell Resources, and numerous other "strategic" stakes and investments. During this period of aggressive growth, AdSteam also had 156 tug boats and operated in over 40 Australian, Indian, Pacific Ocean and British ports. The company was Australia's fourth highest capitalised company during the 1980s.

=== Group structure ===
A characteristic of the AdSteam Group during this period was a complex Group Structure of cross ownership where many of the companies of the group owned not-quite-50% of each other. This served the dual purposes of making the elements of the group "take-over proof", but did not trigger the financial reporting requirements of a consolidated set of accounts. In the 1990 Adelaide Steamship Company Annual Report, the following companies were reported as "Principal operating subsidiaries" of the AdSteam Group, with the following cross ownerships greater than 5%:

The Adelaide Steamship Company

- 100% Marine Interests (various)
- 100% Martin Wells Holdings – optical goods; acquired 1982
- 100% Sellers Atkins – building supplies; acquired 1976
- 100% Pioneer Property Group – House Building & Property Development
- 100% WA Realty – real estate
- 49% David Jones – department stores and investments
- 50% Metro Meat (Holdings) Limited – meat
- 14% Tooth & Co – brewing, hotels, investments, wine, food; acquired 1981; brewing interests sold 1983 to Carlton & United Breweries
- 18% Petersville Sleigh – food, timber, woodchips, mining, distribution of earthmoving equipment, shipping agencies, investments, food product manufacture, distribution and marketing (sold to Pacific Dunlop)
- 13% National Consolidated – diversified manufacturing and marketing, investments
- 33% Industrial Equity food and beverages, energy and resources, manufacturing and distribution, property services, investments
- 18% AWA – manufacturing & installation of electronics & electrical communications products
- 23% Macmahon Holdings – civil engineering, leisure industries
- 48% Markheath Securities plc – property development, manufacturing, investment

David Jones

- 100% John Martin's – department stores; acquired 1985
  - John Martin Financial Services Limited
  - John Martin Retailers Limited
- 44% The Adelaide Steamship Company
- 44% Tooth & Co – hotels, investments, wine, food
- 30% AAM Inc – coal handling, office supplies, investments
- 33% Industrial Equity Limited food and beverages, energy and resources, manufacturing and distribution, property services, investments

Tooth & Co

- 50% Metro Meat (Holdings) Limited – meat
- 33% Industrial Equity Limited food and beverages, tnergy and resources, manufacturing and distribution, property services, investments
- 18% National Consolidated Limited – diversified manufacturing and marketing, investments

Petersville Sleigh

- 30% AAM Inc – coal handling, office supplies, investments
- 51% Howard Smith – shipping, distribution, heavy engineering, investments

National Consolidated Limited

- 20% David Jones – department stores and investments
- 10% Markheath Securities plc – property development, manufacturing, investment

Howard Smith

- 7% Markheath Securities plc

Industrial Equity Limited (IEL)

- 100% Woolworths – retail

=== Other companies, acquisitions and disposals ===
Other companies, acquisitions and disposals in the group included:

- Lockwood locks
- Buffum's – chain of Long Beach, California based department stores
- Wineries, including Penfolds, Wynns Coonawarra Estate, Seaview, Glenloth, Kaiser Stuhl, Barossa Co-op, Tulloch and Loxton Co-op, sold to South Australian Brewing Company in 1990. Other wineries owned by group members at one time or another included Seppelts and Woodley Wines (IEL).
- Bridgestone
- Farmers Union – subsequently floated as part of National Foods
- SAFCOL Food Processing – sold to Tropical Canning (Thailand) plc
- Vaniro – for some reason not explained, Vaniro is not included in the 1990 Annual Report Group Structure diagram. It does, however, feature significantly in the State Bank audit report.
- Dextran Pty Ltd – like Vaniro, another AdSteam subsidiary. Dextran is the owner of IEL.

During the 1980s, AdSteam instigated a number of "share plays", and also made significant investments in a number of companies including:

- ANZ Bank
- Bell Resources
- BHP
- National Australia Bank
- Royal Insurance plc
- Westpac

=== Borrowings ===
All of this was financed by huge borrowings from about 200 banks. The lendings of just one bank, the State Bank of South Australia, are summarised in the following chart.

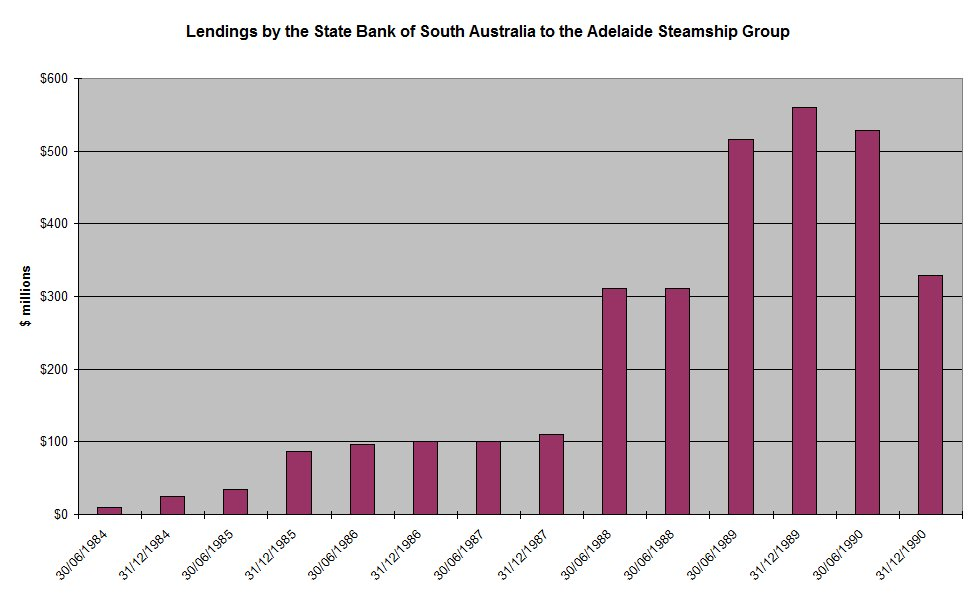

The source of the above data (South Australian Government Auditor in 1993), in a comment dated 26 April 1990, states: "Papers also comment on 'off the record' discussions with Adsteam Group's major bankers and gives exposures of nine banks (including the Bank) which total $4,960M. There is little comment on this figure but an analysis of each company's results shows assets exceed liabilities in each company by a good margin... Paper also comments on recent press issues including potential worst case losses of $110.0M from Bell Resources investment – 'the impact of such a loss ..... is not considered a major concern'."

A subsequent comment dated 26 July 1990 states: "Lending Credit Committee minute notes planned reduction in exposure through maturity of facilities. Also notes extension of other facilities to August 1991 which illustrates 'the continued level of confidence this Bank held in Adsteam's continuity'." With the benefit of hindsight, further comments make interesting reading. Despite the assurances recorded in the board papers, from that point the State Bank of South Australia steadily reduced its exposure to the AdSteam Group.

=== 1990–1991 ===
The opaque nature of the AdSteam Group caused rising concern in a variety of circles. Although shareholders continued to enjoy bonus shares, rights issues, and significant dividends, the share price plateaued. Financial journalists started asking questions, and the share price faltered. After the 1990 Annual General Meeting and the announcement of the 25c dividend (per share) against a diminished share price, investor confidence deserted the company and the share price crashed from over $5 to under $1 in one day.

The previously "nervous" banks were far from happy, and started demanding the return of their capital, despite AdSteam having had this money invested in largely non-liquid assets. Also of course, the banks were not keen to force AdSteam into bankruptcy as such a situation would be unlikely to achieve the return of their assets. Hence, AdSteam organised an "arrangement" with the 200 banks, and in 1991 the Adsteam group was placed under an informal, receivership-type scheme of arrangement. Under this arrangement, there was an orderly disposal of assets.

=== The aftermath ===
In order to facilitate the orderly disposal of assets, a number of the group members were renamed:

- The Adelaide Steamship Company became The Residual Assco Group.
- David Jones Limited became DJL Limited.
- Metro Meat Holdings became Ortem Holdings.

During the course of the disposal, there were a number of sales, and four successful floats:

- National Foods (1991)
- Woolworths (1993)
- David Jones (1995)
- Adsteam Marine (1997)

Nevertheless, not all of the disposals were made under ideal circumstances, and Adsteam's loss of $4.49 billion represented one of Australia's largest corporate collapses.

However, the major lesson out of the AdSteam collapse was for the accounting profession; a newspaper report on its failure carried the sub-headline "Adsteam a humiliation for the accounting profession". Adsteam was "an excellent instance of how the rule-book approach to consolidation accounting imposed by the law and the Accounting Standards at the time determined managerial actions".

The "Adsteam saga" resulted in major changes to Australian accounting rules pertaining to consolidation and led to the issue of AAS 24 Consolidated Financial Statements by the accounting profession in June 1990 for application from 30 June 1991 (subject to a "legal impediment", see Deegan, 2005, p. 880) and the issue of AASB 1024 Consolidated Accounts with statutory backing in 1991.

Specifically, the definition of "control" for consolidation purposes was broadened beyond prescribed ownership interests to embrace control over an entity's financial and operating policies, making use of the notion of "substance over form" in determining the existence of a controlled entity.

==== Industrial Equity Limited ====
Several matters from the collapse are still ongoing – over 15 years after "the collapse". Industrial Equity Limited (IEL) is worthy of particular mention:

- IEL acquired Woolworths in 1989 as a wholly owned subsidiary.
- AdSteam investment company Dextran purchased IEL from Brierley Investments in November 1989.
- Dextran was one-third each owned by AdSteam, David Jones & Tooth.
- IEL delisted in 1990.
- Woolworths floated in 1993 – very successfully – "it was floated in the biggest share sale (at that time) in Australia's history"
- The Australian Taxation Office (ATO) ruled to disallow IEL $524m of deductions.
- IEL challenged this ruling – the matter has been before the courts on and off ever since – "One of the largest and longest tax disputes in Australian history."
- In December 2007, IEL was given leave to challenge the ATO ruling.
- "While prime assets such as Woolworths and Adsteam Marine were floated, IEL and its tax liabilities remained within the corporate shell of Adelaide Steamship when it was renamed Residual Assco Group Ltd in 1997 and delisted in 1999. Residual Assco has no operating businesses but remains active while several IEL tax disputes wind their way through the courts."
- Residual Assco's October 2007 annual report notes that the group holds $429 million "on deposit pending resolution of the outstanding matters between IEL and the ATO". At that time, the ATO were claiming $7.3 billion.
- The dispute continues; the Chairman's address to the concurrent AGMs of Residual Assco, DJL and Tooth on 14 November 2008 is rather bleak. The Tooth & Co. Ltd. Annual Financial Report to 30 June 2008 summarises the then current situation in detail.
- Other sources of information include "The Three Ugly Sisters", Australian Financial Review, 24 December 1999 and Tooth and Co.#Decline.

== Court cases ==
The Adelaide Steamship Company was involved in two court cases which led to changes in the way the Australian Constitution and Australian Law is interpreted.

=== The Engineers' Case ===
Amalgamated Society of Engineers v Adelaide Steamship Co Ltd, (commonly known as the Engineers' Case) was a landmark Australian court case decided in the High Court of Australia on 31 August 1920. From a legal perspective, this case is widely regarded as one of the most important cases ever decided by the High Court of Australia, for it swept away the earlier doctrines of implied intergovernmental immunities and reserved State powers, firmly establishing the modern basis for the legal understanding of federalism in Australia and Australian constitutional law. In essence, this meant that decisions of the Commonwealth Conciliation and Arbitration Court were binding on State governments. and that the constitution is no longer read in a way which attempts to preserve the power of the states.

When providing his judgement on Strickland v Rocla Concrete Pipes Ltd, (where the Court unanimously rejected the decision in Huddart, Parker & Co Pty Ltd v Moorehead, holding that it was based on the rejected doctrine of reserved State powers, which was abolished in Amalgamated Society of Engineers v Adelaide Steamship Co Ltd), Chief Justice Barwick stated "the earlier doctrine virtually reversed the Constitution".

=== ASIC vs former Adsteam directors and auditors ===
"Residual Assco and Australian Securities & Investments Commission (ASIC) vs former Adsteam directors and auditors.

- The litigation was commenced by ASIC in April 1994 under section 50 of the ASC Law, in the name of the Adelaide Steamship Company (renamed Residual Assco. in 1997) and dragged on, unresolved, for 6 years before a settlement was agreed.
- The essential allegation was that there had been an overstatement of profit in the company's accounts and that its investments in 4 subsidiary companies had not been accurately recorded. As a result dividends had not been paid out of profits.
- The proceedings involved numerous decisions and important regulatory outcomes, including:
  - In May 1994 proceedings were brought by Deloitte under the ADJR Act challenging ASIC'sdecision to begin and carry on the Adsteam proceedings. The ADJR proceedings took approximately two and a half years to be finally determined. ASIC's decision was ultimately upheld.
  - "The Adelaide Steamship Co Limited and Australian Securities and Investments Commission v Janis Gunars Spalvins, Michael James Kent, Neil Leslie Branford, Kenneth William Russell, Michael Stevenson Gregg, Deloitte Haskings & Sells and Deloitte Ross Tohmatsu", more concisely referred to as "Adelaide Steamship Co Ltd v Spalvins", This was an appeal by ASIC against an earlier ruling in favour of Spalvins et al. regarding client legal privilege. The appeal was only partially successful and ASIC were required to produce Counsel's advice on which privilege had been waived.
  - In June 1999 the High Court held that the constitution did not allow State judicial power to be vested in the Federal Court. As a result, the Adsteam proceedings, which had been brought in the Federal Court, could not proceed because the Federal Court did not have jurisdiction to hear them.
  - Following the introduction of the Federal Courts (State Jurisdiction) Act 1999 (SA), which was intended to address some of the effects of the decision in Re Wakim, an application was made in the Supreme Court of South Australia effectively to have the Adsteam proceeding transferred to that Court. The validity of the relevant provisions of the Federal Courts (State Jurisdiction) Act was challenged by some of the defendant directors. On 25 May 2000 the High Court upheld the validity of section 11 of that Act. (The application to have the matter transferred was still pending before the Supreme Court of South Australia at the time of the settlement.)

== Timeline ==
- 1875 Company formed September 1875
- 1875 Company incorporated 8 October 1875
- 1882 Amalgamated with Spencer's Gulf Steamship Co Ltd
- 1882 Bought out William Whinham
- 1883 Bought out Anderson & Marshall
- 1887 Locks out members of the Captains & Officers' Society when it seeks to affiliate with the Maritime Labour Council
- 1900 Liquidated and reconstructed
- 1903 Adelaide building at 17 Currie Street
- 1904 Adelaide Steamship Company building constructed in Melbourne
- 1911 SS Yongala lost without trace (discovered in 1958)
- 1912 SS Koombana lost without trace
- 1914–1918 World War I – several ships were requisitioned
- 1915 Took over Coast Steamships Limited
- 1920 Liquidated and reconstructed
- 1920 Amalgamated Society of Engineers v Adelaide Steamship Co Ltd (The Engineers' Case)
- 1933 First John Martin's Christmas Pageant
- 1935 Formed Adelaide Airways Limited
- 1936 Purchased West Australian Airways
- 1936 Merged with Holyman's Airways to form Australian National Airways
- 1939 Currie St (Adelaide) building changed significantly
- 1939–1945 World War II – several ships were requisitioned
- 1940s Diversified into towage, shipbuilding, and the shipping of salt, coal and sugar.
- 1957 Sold Australian National Airways to Ansett Transport Industries
- 1964 Interstate fleet merged with McIlwraith, McEacharn & Co to form Associated Steamship Limited
- 1964 The world's first purpose-built container ship was constructed
- 1965 Acquired 40% interest in Bulkships
- 1968 Coast Steamships Limited no longer "retained its own identity"
- 1968 Bulkships acquired Associated Steamship Limited
- 1976 Tooth & Co acquired Penfolds
- 1977 Bulkships sold; ceased connection with ship owning and operating
- 1980 Acquired a substantial interest in David Jones
- 1980 Adelaide Steamship Company building in Melbourne destroyed
- 1981 Acquired Tooth & Co (via David Jones (Properties) Pty Ltd)
- 1981 Acquired Georges (via David Jones)
- 1982 Acquired Buckley & Nunn (via David Jones)
- 1983 Sold Tooth & Co brewing interests to Carlton & United Breweries
- 1985 Acquired John Martin's
- 1986 Currie Street building demolished to make way for the State Bank Building, completed in 1988
- 1989 Industrial Equity Limited purchased from Brierley Investments
- 1990 Wine interests sold to South Australian Brewing Company
- 1990 Share price crash
- 1991 Adsteam commenced liquidation of assets
- 1991 National Foods floated
- 1993 Woolworths floated
- 1993 Adsteam Marine created as the last remaining operational division of Adelaide Steamship Company.
- 1994 The Australian Taxation Office ruled to disallow IEL $524m of deductions regarding the Woolworth float
- 1994 "Adelaide Steamship Company (via ASIC) vs former Adsteam directors and auditors" commenced
- 1995 David Jones floated
- 1997 Adelaide Steamship Company renamed Residual Assco Group
- 1997 Adsteam Marine floated
- 1999 Liquidation of assets completed – Residual Assco Limited delisted – "Residual Assco has no operating businesses but remains active while several IEL tax disputes wind their way through the courts."
- 2000 "Residual Assco (via ASIC) vs former AdSteam directors and auditors" reached settlement
- 2001 Adsteam Marine acquired tug operations of Howard Smith for A$500m
- 2006 Adsteam Marine acquired by AP Moeller-Maersk
- 2007 Residual Assco's annual report notes that the group holds $429 million "on deposit pending resolution of the outstanding matters between IEL and the ATO"
- 2007 IEL given leave to challenge the ATO ruling

== People ==
Throughout its history, many people have been involved with, played significant roles in and/or been associated with the company:

- Robert Barr Smith (1824–1915) – founding director. Brother-in-law of founding director Sir Thomas Elder, with whom he was partner in Elder Smith and Company. (Barr Smith married Elder's sister Joanna.)
- Tom Elder Barr Smith (1863–1941) – director (eldest son of Robert Barr Smith)
- Sir Tom Elder Barr Smith (1904–1968) – director and deputy chairman (1960–1968) (son of Tom Elder Barr Smith)
- William Beardmore, 1st Baron Invernairn (1856–1936) – shipbuilder
- William Berry (1857–1928) – completed his qualifying sea service with the company and went on to become their chief engineer
- Neil Leslie Branford – Chief Accountant of John Martin's, AdSteam Company Secretary from the mid-1980s to early 1990s
- Ron Brierley – New Zealand investor, corporate raider, and chairman and director of a number of companies in Australia, New Zealand and the UK. He founded Brierley Investments in 1961 and purchased his first shareholdings in Industrial Equity Limited (IEL) in 1964. IEL purchased Woolworths in 1989, and later in 1989 Brierly sold IEL to the AdSteam Group.
- George Calder (1839–1903) – mariner
- David Charleston (1848–1934) – marine engineer and unionist who worked for the company after migrating to Australia in 1884
- Bruce Corlett – Chairman of Adsteam Marine Limited
- Charles D'Ebro (1850–1920) – architect who in 1904 designed the Adelaide Steamship Building in Melbourne
- Deloitte Haskings & Sells and Deloitte Ross Tohmatsu – Adsteam auditors (?-1990)
- Frank Duffy (1852–1936) – High Court Judge involved in the decision of the Engineers' Case
- Sir Walter Gordon Duncan (1885–1963) – Director between 1932 and 1960
- Francis Vivian Dunstan – father of Don Dunstan; former Premier of South Australia; manager of the company's Fiji office from 1916 until the family's return to Adelaide in 1933
- Sir Thomas Elder (1818–1897) – founding director. Brother-in-law of founding director Robert Barr Smith, with whom he was partner in Elder Smith and Company. Elder never married, but Barr Smith named his first-born Tom Elder Barr Smith.
- Alexander Forrest (1849–1901) – negotiated in 1893 the contract with the Adelaide Steamship for serving Western Australian ports
- Clayton Frederick – Chief Executive Officer between 1993 and 2004, during Adsteam Marine's expansion to become Australia's largest towage operator
- James Gosse (1876–1952) – director and chairman
- Michael Stevenson Gregg – director (?-1990)
- Robert Holmes à Court – Australia's first billionaire; a feared corporate raider of the 1980s who set up Bell Resources, a company 20% owned by the AdSteam Group
- Sir Ivan Nello Holyman (1896–1957) – merged Holymany's Airways with AdSteam's Adelaide Airways in 1936, and initiated moves which led in November 1936 to the formation of Australian National Airways
- Henry Keep (1863–1905) – shipping agent for AdSteam in Fremantle, 1893–1897
- Michael James Kent – director (?-1990)
- Herbert Lloyd (1883–1957) – board member of several companies, including the Adelaide Steamship Company, from 1946 to his retirement
- George R L Macdonald – company secretary (1990–1994) and corporate lawyer
- Malcolm McEacharn (1852–1910) – shipowner and partner of McIlwraith, McEacharn & Co which merged with the Adelaide Steamship Co in 1964
- Andrew McIlwraith (1844–1932) – shipowner and partner of McIlwraith, McEacharn & Co which merged with the Adelaide Steamship Co in 1964
- Hugo Muecke (1842–1929) – director of many companies, including the Adelaide Steamship
- Guy Packard (1884–1963) – Manager and later Director; also had financial interests in Australian National Airways
- Daniel Poole DCM & Bar (1882–1959) – recommended for the VC during World War I; worked for both McIlwraith, McEacharn & Co and Adelaide Steamship Company
- Robert Dalrymple Ross (1827–1887) – Chairman of the company during the 1870s and 1880s
- Ken Russell (Kenneth William Russell, ?-1999) – Chairman (?-1990)
- David J Ryan – held various senior positions in the company from 1997 to 2002; foundation Managing Director of Adsteam Marine Limited
- Charles Seymour (1853–1924) – seaman, journalist and militant unionist who worked for the company in the late 1800s
- John Spalvins (Janis Gunars Spalvins) – Managing Director (1977–1990)
- Andrew Tennant (1835–1913) – founding director
- Alfred Wells – designer of original company building at 17 Currie Street, Adelaide
- Robert Wright – executive director, 1991–1995

== Company archives ==
The archives of the Adelaide Steamship Company are held by the Noel Butlin Archives Centre at the Australian National University in Canberra.

== See also ==
- Mosquito Fleet (Johnstone River, Queensland)#The Adelaide Steamship Company
- Timeline of Australian history

== References and notes ==
- Clarke, Frank, Graeme Dean and Kyle Oliver (2003). Corporate Collapse: Accounting, Regulatory and Ethical Failure, 2nd Edition. Published by Cambridge University Press. OCLC 51637715. ISBN 0-521-82684-5. Front matter Index
