= HMAT Warilda =

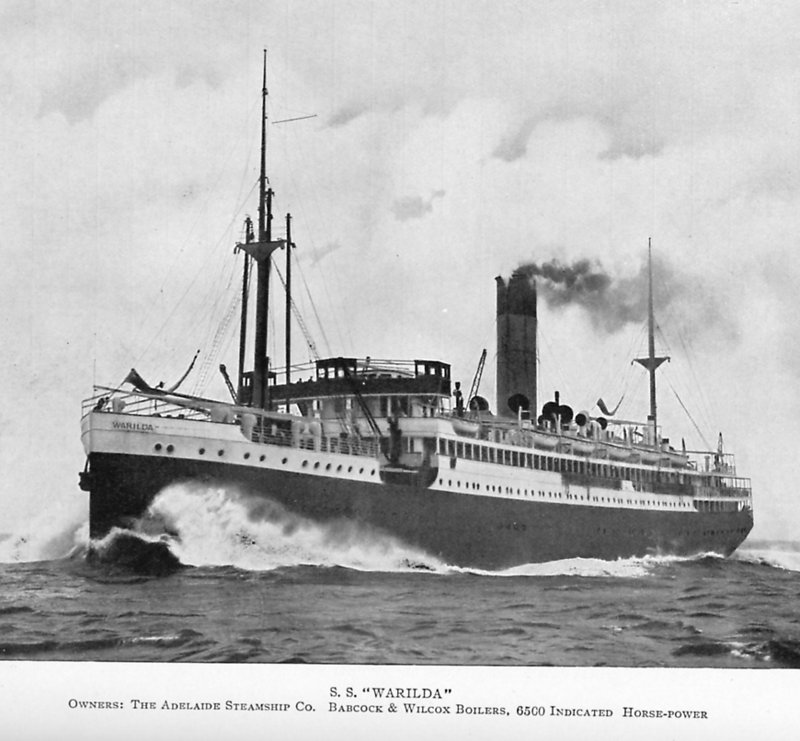
- Warilda

History

United Kingdom
- Name: Warilda
- Operator: Adelaide Steamship Company
- Builder: William Beardmore and Company, Glasgow
- Yard number: 505
- Launched: 5 December 1911
- Maiden voyage: 1912
- Fate: Torpedoed and sunk on 3 August 1918.

General characteristics
- Tonnage: 7,713 GRT
- Length: 411 ft 3 in (125.35 m)
- Beam: 56 ft 7 in (17.25 m)
- Draught: 34 ft 1 in (10.39 m)
- Installed power: 626 nhp on 6 coal-fired boilers
- Propulsion: Twin quadruple expansion engines
- Speed: 16.36 knots (30.30 km/h; 18.83 mph) maximum

HMAT Warilda (Note: HMAT is a ship prefix that stands for His Majesty's Australian Transport) was a 7,713-gross register ton (GRT) vessel, built by William Beardmore and Company in Glasgow as SS Warilda for the Adelaide Steamship Company. She was designed for the East-West Australian coastal service, but following the start of the First World War, she was converted into a troopship and later, in 1916, she was converted into a hospital ship.

Her identical sister ships, also built by William Beardmore and Company, were HMAT Wandilla (2) (1912) and SS Willochra (1913).

== Time as a troopship ==
- 5 October 1915: 10th Reinforcements, 9th Battalion embarked from Brisbane heading to Egypt.: 15 Batt embarked Brisbane HMAT A69 Warilda same date
- 8 October 1915: 10th Reinforcements, 1st Infantry Battalion embarked from Sydney heading to Egypt.
- 8 October 1915: 10th Reinforcements, 1st Brigade of the AIF, embarked from Liverpool, NSW, Australia. The ship arrived at Fremantle, Western Australia on 15 October 1915, and reached Suez on 5 November, when the troops were disembarked.
- 25 May 1916: Tunneling Companies, 2 Reinforcements embarked Melbourne.
- 1 June 1916: Tunneling Company 6, 3rd Tunneling Company embarked from Fremantle, Western Australia 1 June 1916. Disembarked Plymouth, England, 18 July 1916.

== Sinking ==
On 3 August 1918, HMAT Warilda was transporting wounded soldiers from Le Havre, France, to Southampton when she was torpedoed by the German submarine UC-49. This was despite being marked clearly with the Red Cross; as with a number of other hospital ships torpedoed during the war, Germany claimed the ships were also carrying arms.

The ship sank in about two hours, and of the 801 persons on board, 123 died due to the sinking. The Deputy Chief Controller of the Queen Mary's Army Auxiliary Corp, Mrs Violet Long, lost her life in this action. Among the survivors was her commander, Captain Sim, who was later awarded the OBE by King George V. Her wreck lies in the English Channel.

== Gallery ==
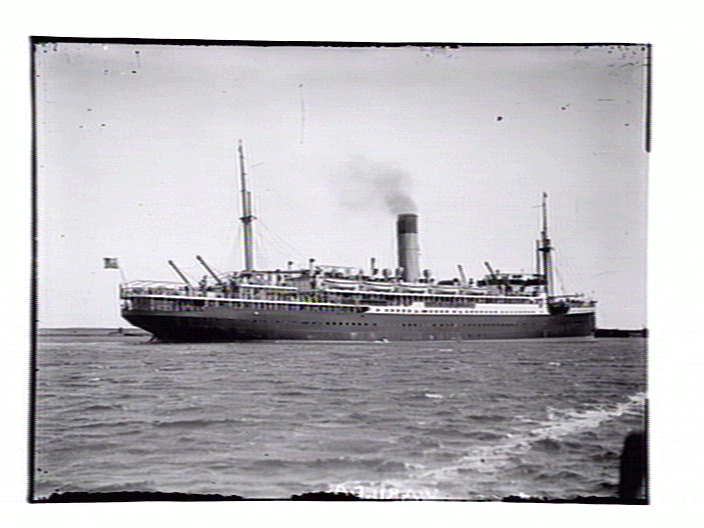
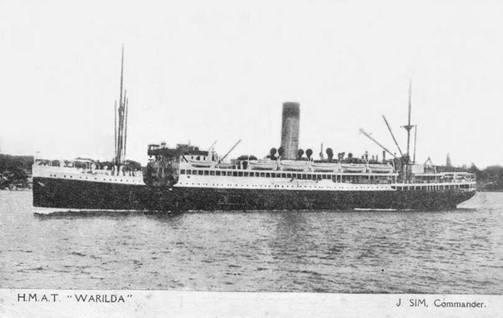
