= Petersville (company) =

Australian food manufacturing company

- Type: Listed company as Petersville Australia Limited
- Traded as: ASX: PTV (1964–1983)
- Industry: Food manufacturing
- Predecessor: Edgell; Peters Ice Cream
- Founded: 1961
- Defunct: 19 October 1983 (delisted from ASX)
- Fate: Corporate raid (1982); Subsidiary (1983); Brands subsequently sold, some via private equity to: Froneri, Simplot, Patties Foods, anor. (c. 2002)
- Successor: Peterville Sleigh (1981-1982); Adelaide Steamship Company (1982–1991); Pacific Dunlop (1991–c. 2002)
- Headquarters: Mulgrave, Victoria, Australia
- Area served: Australasia
- Products: Ice cream; yogurt; cheese; butter; frozen goods; meat pies
- Brands: Peters Ice Cream; Four'n Twenty; Edgell; Birds Eye

Petersville Australia Limited was an Australian food manufacturing company. Traded on the Australian Stock Exchange from 1964 until 1983, its brands were developed as part of the growth of the post-war Australian food manufacturing industry.

== History ==
Petersville was founded in 1961 when Edgell and Peters Ice Cream merged. Some of the foods it produced or distributed included ice cream, yogurt, cheese, butter and imported cheeses. Among its brand names were Peters Ice Cream, Four'n Twenty, Edgell, and Birds Eye, that are continued to be manufactured and sold through various other corporate entities.

In May 1981, H.C. Sleigh Co. launched a successful takeover offer and rebranded the company Petersville Sleigh. In 1982, Petersville Sleigh was raided by the Adelaide Steamship Company and was delisted from the ASX on 19 October 1983. Following the demise of AdSteam, in October 1991 the company was purchased by Pacific Dunlop. The Petersville brands were divested in c. 2002 as part of the demise of Pacific Dunlop.

=== Locations ===
Head office

Petersville Head Office
- Interactive map of Petersville Head Office
- 37°55′06″S 145°09′13″E
- Type: Commercial office
- Location: 254-294 Wellington Road, Mulgrave, Melbourne, Victoria

History
- Built: 1962–1963
- Built for: Peters Ice Cream (Vic) Ltd
- Original use: Factory administration; head office

Site notes
- Material: Steel, brick, timber, concrete
- Architect: D. Graeme Lumsden (firm)
- Architectural style: Modernist
- Current use: vacant (since 2016)
- Public access: No

Victorian Heritage Register
- Official name: Petersville Factory Administration Building
- Type: Registered place
- Criteria: A, D
- Designated: 19 December 2019
- Reference no.: H2394
- Heritage overlay no.: HO86
- Category: Manufacturing and Processing

Initially built for Peters Ice Cream (Vic) Ltd who were vacating their existing inner-city Richmond site, the Wellington Road, Mulgrave-building became the head office for the newly-formed merged company of Petersville Australia Limited. (Note: There were pushes to name the newly created suburb of Mulgrave as Petersville.) Peters Ice Cream acquired 35 hectares (86 acres) in Melbourne's outer eastern suburbs in 1961 in the suburb that was then known as Clayton. The Petersville factory administration building was added to the Victorian Heritage Register on 19 December 2019 in recognition of its historical significance. It is considered a notable example of a post-war factory administration building, including a distinctive street frontage and utilitarian buildings located to the rear of the site.

Designed by D. Graeme Lumsden in the Modernist style, the two-storey brick building was officially opened in 1964 by the Governor of Victoria on 12 May 1964. Occupied until 2016, the administration building is H-shape in plan and is set back generously from Wellington Road. Its projecting upper level supported by concrete columns and its narrow balcony is covered by a full height, full length, honeycomb-patterned metal screen.

In 2017 Peters Ice Cream (as Nestlé Australia/Froneri) opened a new head office building at the rear of the site, and sold the land on which the original head office building sits to Charter Hall for redevelopment.

Other factories

Petersville had dairy production plants at Warragul, Trafalgar and Yarragon in Victoria and at Orange, Taree and Grafton in New South Wales. The Warragul dairy production plant ceased production in the 1990's and caught fire on 17 April 2026.

== Gallery ==
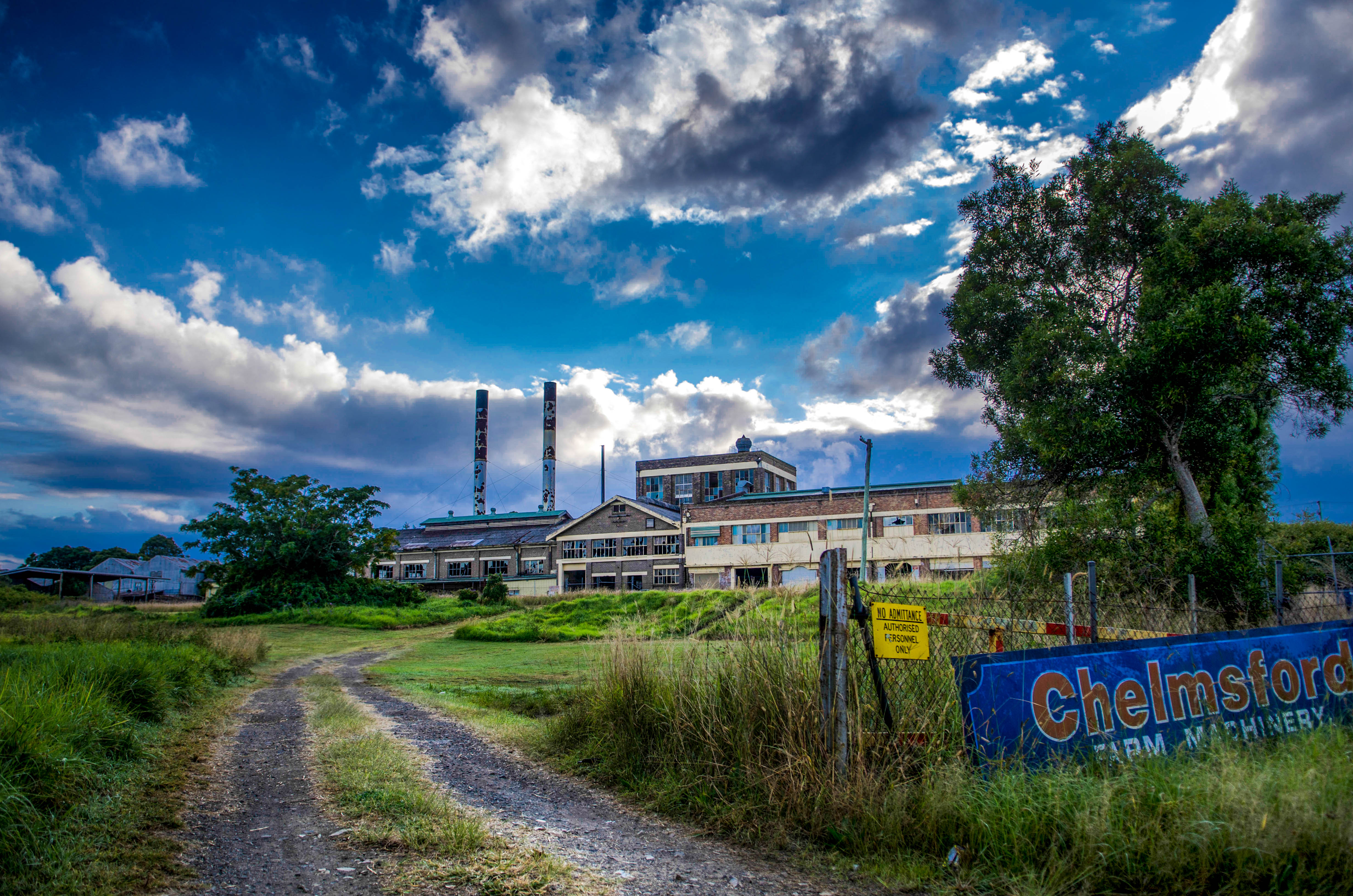
Abandoned Peters Ice Cream factory in Taree

== See also ==
- Architecture of Melbourne
