= McIlwraith, McEacharn & Co =

Australian shipping company

- House flag
- Industry: Shipping
- Founded: 1875
- Founder: Andrew McIlwraith; Malcolm McEacharn
- Headquarters: Melbourne
- Area served: Australia

McIlwraith, McEacharn & Co (MMC) was an Australian shipping company.

== History ==
McIlwraith, McEacharn & Co (MMC) was founded in 1875 in London by Scottish sea captains Andrew McIlwraith and Malcolm McEacharn. In 1876 it began operating ships to take British migrants to Australia under contract to the Government of Queensland. In 1891, it relocated its headquarters to Melbourne.

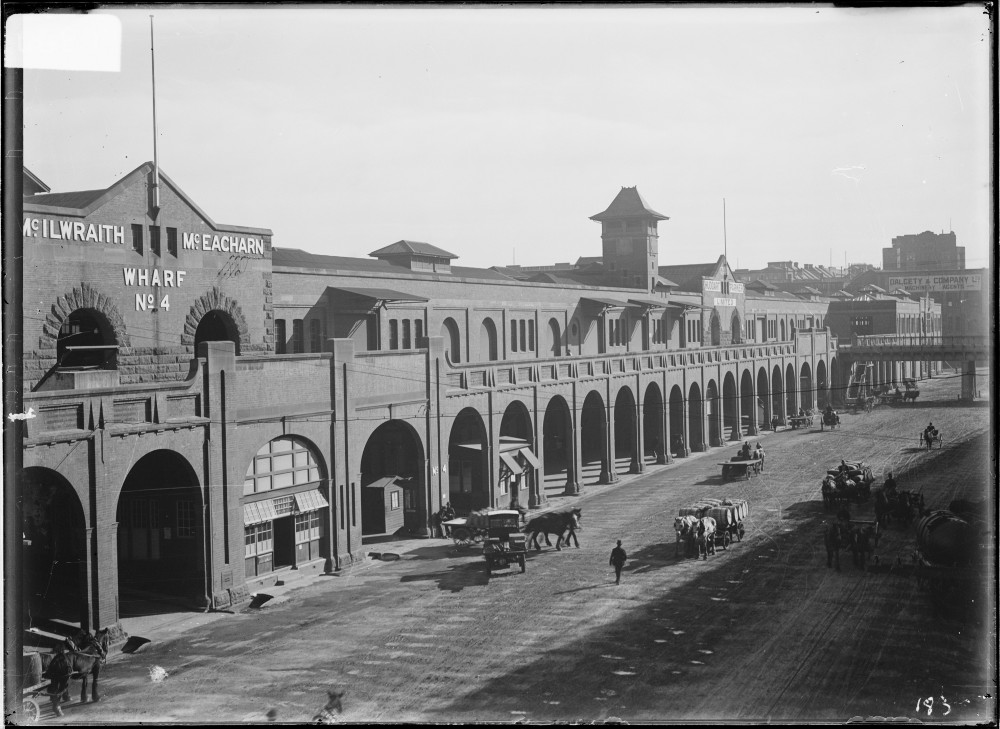
McIlwraith, McEacharn's wharf number 4 in Sydney

An office building at 45 Hunter Street, Newcastle, named Scottish House, completed in 1923, was designed by Spain and Cosh for MMC. The heritage-listed building is now known as T & G Mutual Life Assurance Building.

MMC built up a coal bunkering business, had a shareholding in Mount Morgan Mine, and had associations with Burns Philp and Castlemaine Perkins. In 1958, MMC became a shareholder in bulk carrier operator Bulkships in partnership with the Adelaide Steamship Company.

In May 1993, MMC was sold to Cyprus Mining Company.
