= Lego Pompeii =

Large LEGO model

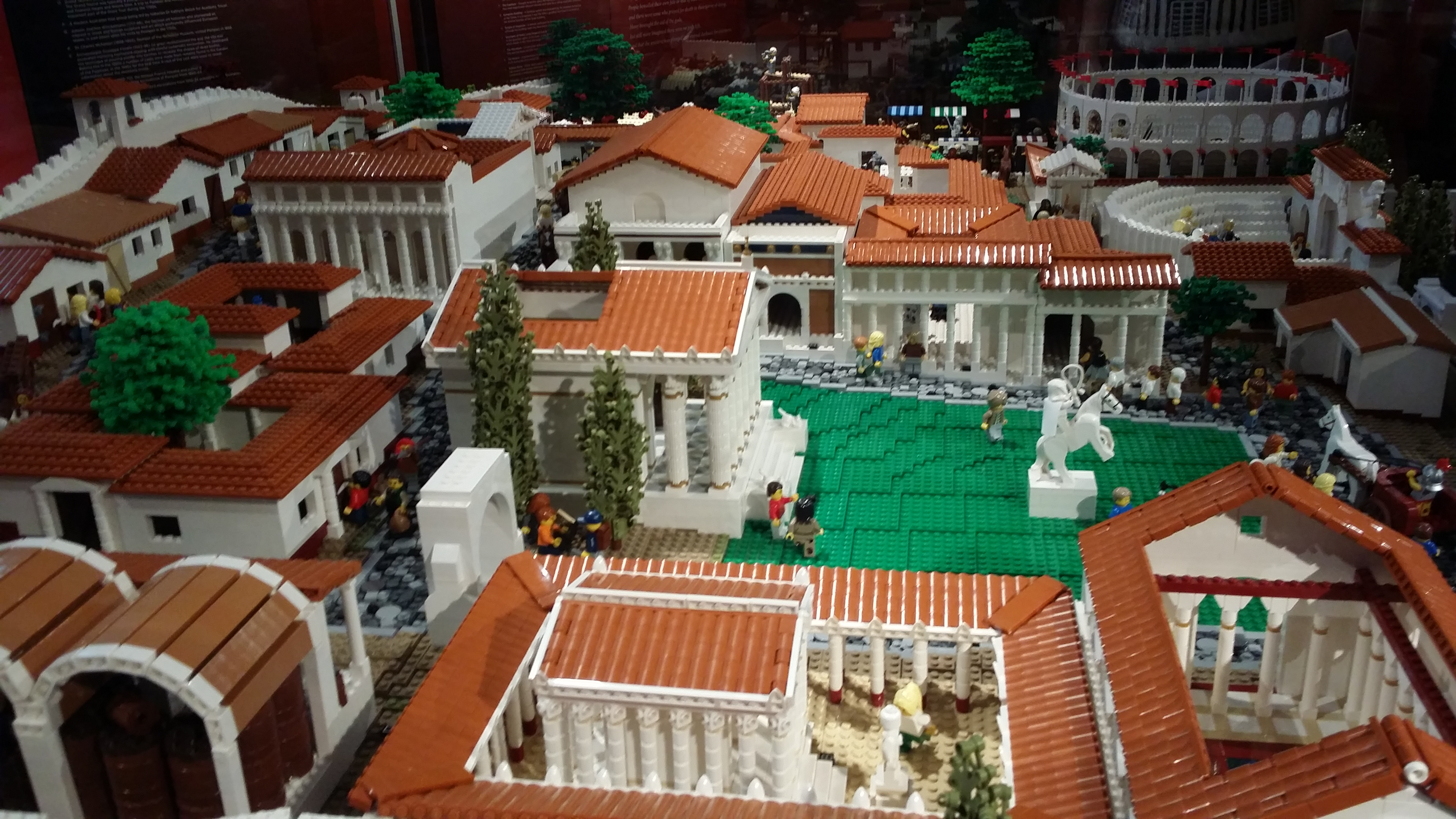
Lego pompeii

Lego Pompeii is notable for being among the largest of all Lego historical models. Lego Pompeii was developed by Ryan McNaught of Melbourne, Australia, a notable Lego artist known as "The Brickman."

== Background ==
The Lego Pompeii exhibition (as it is also known) is currently on display at the Chau Chak Wing Museum, which is located opposite the Quadrangle in the University of Sydney, where it was moved after the closure of the Nicholson Museum in February 2020. The exhibition was commissioned by the Nicholson Museum and opened on 10 January 2015. The historical model is used to commemorate three historical moments in the history of Pompeii. Firstly, it commemorates the moment in 79AD when the volcano Mount Vesuvius erupted. Secondly, it commemorates the period when it was discovered again during the 1700s. It is also a stylised representation of what Pompeii looks like today. The display also depicts excavation sites that have occurred in Pompeii, as well as archaeologists including Fiorelli, Spinazzola and Maiuri.

== Construction ==
The material of construction of Lego Pompeii contributes to its notability. Though tied to "classical antiquity," this stylised representation of the ruined city of Pompeii is a product of modernity. The Nicholson Museum, the oldest university museum in Australia, boasts is reported to be "home to the largest collection of antiquities in the Southern Hemisphere." The Lego Pompeii installation, constructed from plastic, a synthetic material of the modern age, therefore stands in contradistinction to the other artefacts, all antiquities in the Museum.

In the LEGO Pompeii display, developer Ryan McNaught mixes both fact and fiction. For example, he uses several popular culture references in his model. An example of this is one section of the display in which we can see the band Pink Floyd performing at the Amphitheatre. Another example is a depiction of Mozart playing the piano in the Temple of Isis.

== Other LEGO historical models ==
Other historical models developed by McNaught from LEGO blocks include "The Colosseum" and "LEGO Acropolis." The LEGO Colusseum, the largest of McNaught's historical models, consists of 200,000 LEGO blocks and the Colosseum represented in cross-section, showing half of its present-day "ruined form." It also includes a "backstage" which depicts the holding area for condemned prisoners, ferocious animals and gladiators comprising 60,000 blocks. The University of Sydney's Nicholson Museum sponsored the launch of the LEGO Colosseum in its Quadrangle in July 2012, and was then on exhibition at the Powerhouse Museum until July 30, 2012. The University of Sydney also commissioned LEGO Acropolis, which took McNaught 300 hours to build. The exhibit consisted of 120,000 LEGO bricks and the university donated to the representation of the Acropolis to the Acropolis Museum.
