= Chau Chak Wing Museum =

Museum in Camperdown, New South Wales, Australia

Coordinates: 33.8853°S 151.1905°E

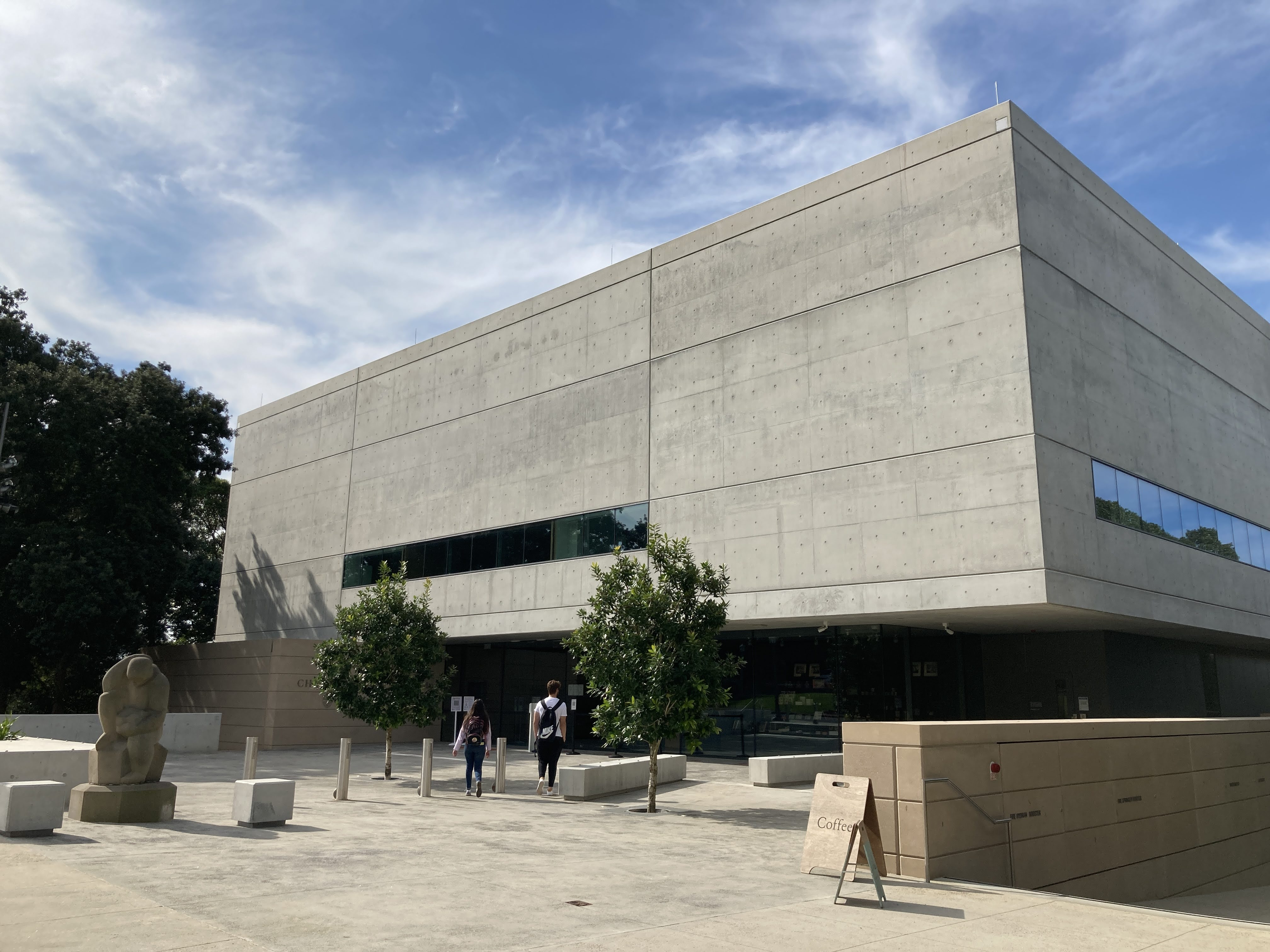
- Established: 2020
- Location: University Pl, Camperdown, New South Wales, Australia
- Collections: Archaeology, Art, Ethnography, Natural History
- Director: Michael Dagostino
- Architect: Johnson Pilton Walker
- Owner: University of Sydney
- Website: https://www.sydney.edu.au/museum/

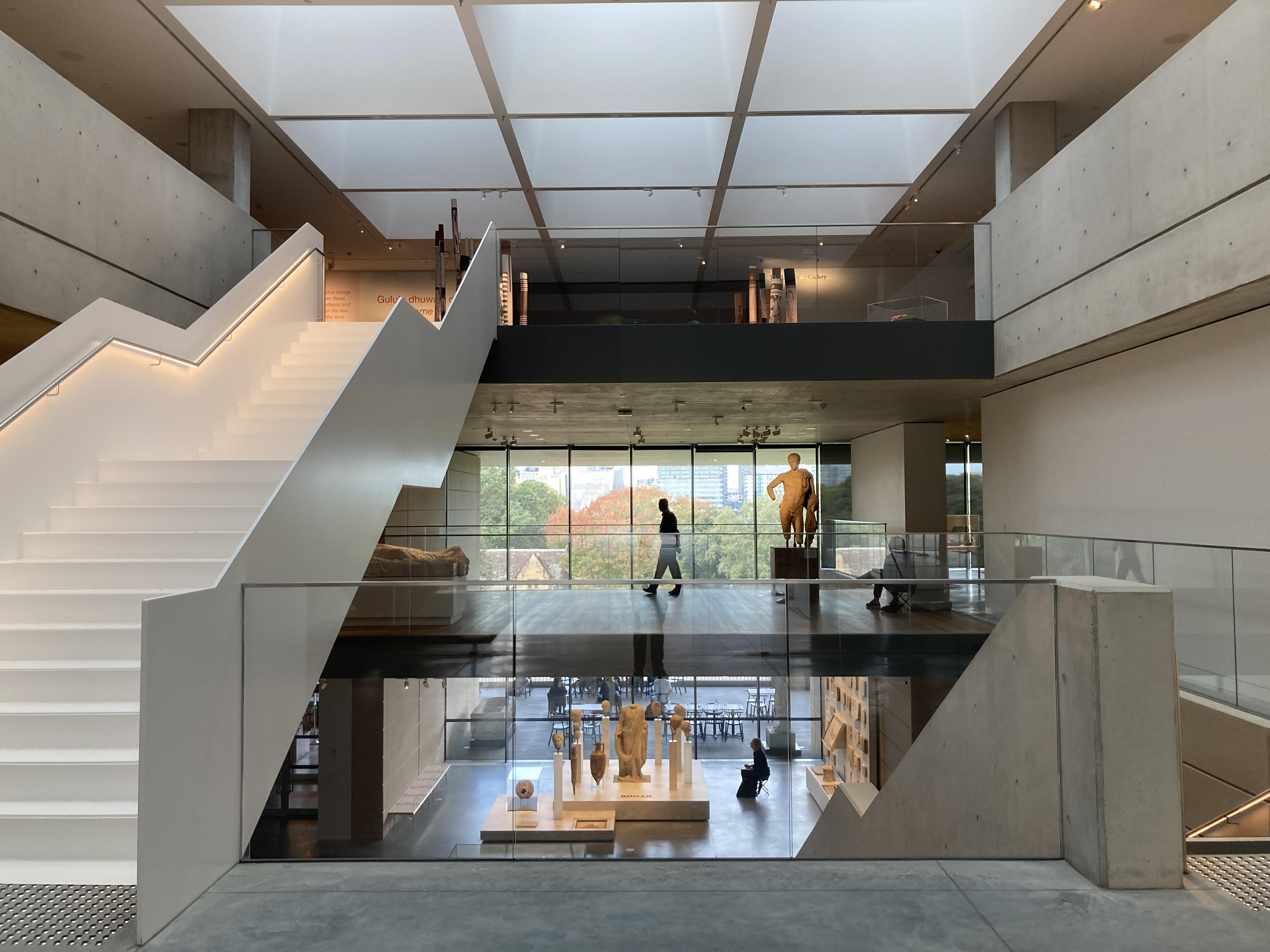
The interior of the Chau Chak Wing Museum

The Chau Chak Wing Museum is a university museum at the University of Sydney, Australia.

It was formed as an amalgamation of the Nicholson Museum, the Macleay Museum, and the University Art Gallery in 2020.

== History ==
The collections began with the Nicholson Collection of antiquities in 1860 and continued to grow to include the Macleay Collections of natural history, ethnography, science and historic photography, and the University Art Collection. The three collections were brought together under Sydney University Museums in 2003.

The museum is named after Chau Chak Wing, a Chinese-Australian businessman who donated $15 million for the building's construction in 2015. Other major benefactors were Penelope Seidler, the Ian Potter Foundation and Nelson Meers Foundation. The museum was officially opened on the 18 November 2020.

In September 2023 it hosted the International Council of Museums Committee for University Museums and Collections Conference, "Truth-telling through university museums and collections".

The museum's collection of human remains from Egypt was featured in the second season of Stuff the British Stole.

In 2026, the director Michael Dagostino proposed a major restructure for the museum, with eight full time staff positions being made redudant, primarily from the curatorial team, in favour of hiring a second deputy director.

=== Directors ===
- David Ellis (2020-2023)
- Michael Dagostino (2023–present)

== Building ==
The building is located on Camperdown Campus of the University of Sydney, opposite the Main Quadrangle and Fisher Library. The building was designed by Johnson Pilton Walker. The building is five-storey, with four levels of exhibition space with six main galleries: Ian Potter Gallery, Macleay Gallery, Nicholson Gallery, Penelope Gallery, Power Gallery, and the China Gallery. Indigenous Australian design features were incorporated design and landscaping of the building. The forecourt incorporates a replica of a pre-invasion Aboriginal petroglyph of two wallabies originally located in Westleigh and the foyer prominently displays a Welcome to Country in the Sydney language.

Construction of the new museum was completed in 2020.

== Collections ==
CCWM has three main collections, the Macleay Collection, the Nicholson Collection, and the University of Art Collection.

=== Macleay Collection ===
The Macleay Collection is the oldest natural history collection in Australia, originating in the cabinets of Alexander Macleay, and expanding through the collecting networks of the Macleay family from Charles Darwin to Sir Stamford Raffles.

It contains historically rich collections of Aboriginal, Torres Strait and Pacific Islanders' cultural material, including objects collected on the early scientific expedition, the Chevert, and those collected in the early years of anthropology at the University of Sydney.

The work of University of Sydney scientists is reflected in the collection of scientific instruments and apparatus used in research and teaching, and is part of the story of scientific practice in Australia.

The Historic Photograph Collection records life in Australia and the Pacific region, from the late 1840s to the 1960s, as captured by both commercial and amateur photographers. It includes a wide range of photographic formats, reflecting the changing technology of photography.

In addition, the Macleay Collections holds material reflecting the museum's history, including a significant library, furniture, documents and ephemera relating to the major collectors.

=== Nicholson Collection ===
The Nicholson Collection contains nearly 30,000 artefacts representing ancient cultures from the Mediterranean, North Africa, the Middle East and Europe. Spanning from the Palaeolithic to the late medieval period, these artefacts hold intimate stories of people's everyday lives, ancient environments, and cultural activity for over more than 10,000 years.

The collection was founded in 1860 by Sir Charles Nicholson with a donation of Etruscan, Greek, Roman and Egyptian antiquities acquired to establish a museum, "calculated materially to promote the object[ives] for which the [University of Sydney] was founded." By 1870, the University of Sydney's Museum of Antiquities included over 3,000 artefacts and had been nicknamed the Nicholsonian Museum.

Over the past 160 years, the Nicholson Collection has expanded through ambitious acquisition programs, generous donation and private bequests. International excavations in Egypt, Cyprus and the Middle East, partly sponsored by the University of Sydney have also contributed significant objects to the collection.

=== University Art Collection ===
The collection contains more than 8000 works including paintings, sculptures, photography and ceramics. Among the first donors was one of its founders, Sir Charles Nicholson, who gave some 30 European paintings, tapestries and sculptures in 1865. The strength of the collection lies in Australian painting – including Indigenous art – as well as significant holdings in European and Asian art.

=== Human remains ===
CCWM holds 950 identified human remains across its collections. This includes the remains of Aboriginal and Torres Strait Islanders, as well as remains from what is now the Czech Republic, Cyprus, Egypt, France, Israel, Palestine, Papua New Guinea, Fiji, Vanuatu, the Solomon Islands, Timor, and Peru.

== Current exhibitions ==
- Ambassadors
- Crossroads - Ancient Cyprus
- Dance Protest, Project Banaba
- Hercules: Myth and Legacy
- Impressions of Greece
- Instrumental 4. Collections from Science: Physiology
- J.W. Power: Art, war and the avant-garde
- Kerameikos - the potters' quarter
- Mediterranean Identities: Across the wine-dark sea
- The Mummy Room
- Natural Selections: animal worlds
- Pharaonic Obsessions: Ancient Egypt, an Australian Story
- Roman Spectres
- Student Life: Max Dupain at the University of Sydney
- The trace is not a presence...
- Villages and Empires: Ancient Cultures of the Middle East

== Past exhibitions ==
=== 2025 ===
- Contemporary Art Project #6. Consuelo Cavaniglia: seeing through you
- Micro:Macro - models of insight and inspiration
- Mungari: Fishing, Resistance, Return
- Union Made: Art from the University of Sydney Union

=== 2024 ===
- Barbara McGrady: Australia Has a Black History
- Chinese Toggles: Culture in Miniature
- Contemporary Art Project #5. Hayley Millar Baker: Nyctinasty
- Instrumental 3. Collections from Science: Surveying
- Ömie barkcloth: Pathways of nioge
- Photography and the performative
- The Staged Photograph
- Ten Thousand Suns
- Tidal Kin - Stories from the Pacific

=== 2023 ===
- Australian Seashores
- Coastline
- Contemporary Art Project #3. D Harding with Kate Harding: Through a lens of visitation
- Contemporary Art Project #4. Mikala Dwyer: Penelope and the Seahorse
- Instrumental 2. Collections from science: Optical instruments
- Object/Art/Specimen
- Sentient Paper
- Sherman Gift

=== 2022 ===
- Animal Gods: Classics and Classification
- Contemporary Art Project #2. Sarah Goffman: Applied Arts
- Instrumental 1. Collections from science: Calculating and Computing
- Kamay (Botany Bay) spears: Yesterday, today, and tomorrow
- Light & Darkness
- Pacific views

=== 2021 ===
- The Business of Photography
- Contemporary Art Project #1. Daniel Boyd: Pediment/Impediment
- Gululu dhuwala djalkiri: welcome to the Yolŋu foundations

== Awards ==
In 2021, CCWM won the Museums and Galleries National Award (MAGNA) and two Museums Australasia Multimedia and Publication Design Awards (MAPDA). CCWM won the 2023 UMAC Award for its object-based learning program. It is the first time the UMAC Award has been won by an Australian university.

== Teaching ==
CCWM's object-based learning program aims to provide access to the collections to university students. This has including increasing cross-disciplinary collaborations with parts of the university that did not traditionally engage with the collections, such as the University of Sydney Business School and Medical Sciences.

== Research ==
=== Egyptian-Australian community initiative ===
In 2022 the curators of the Nicholson Collection and our research partners from the Egypt's Dispersed Heritage Project, Heba Abd Al-Gawad and Alice Stevenson, invited members of the Egyptian-Australian community to a weekend long focus group to discuss the ways in which Egyptian heritage is interpreted and ways forward for participation.

=== Egyptian stelae ===
This interdisciplinary project examines 20 ancient Egyptian stelae, made from limestone, pottery and wood that were produced and decorated between the New Kingdom (c.1500–1069 BCE) and the Ptolemaic Period (c.332–30 BCE).

=== Excavating MacGregor ===
The first Administrator of British New Guinea, William MacGregor, made a significant collection of objects between 1888 and 1898, specifically for its future citizens. The aim of the project is to re-assemble and re-connect this material by 'excavating' its private and official components, focusing on the makers and traders to disentangle the social relationships embedded in the objects.

=== Human remains research project ===
This research project seeks to understand better different public attitudes and responses to the display of human remains with a particular focus on museum visitors and Egyptian communities in Australia's diaspora, in Egypt, and elsewhere.

=== The Jericho Research Project ===
An ongoing research project to investigate the museum's holdings from Jericho in the West Bank. The collection was obtained as the Nicholson Museum was one of the financial sponsors for Kathleen Kenyon's archaeological research in the region.

=== Paphos Theatre Archeological Project ===
Ongoing excavations at the ancient theatre and surrounding environs of Nea Paphos that was the capital of Cyprus under the Ptolemaic and then Roman administrations. The Paphos excavations are supported by the Australian Archaeological Institute at Athens.

=== Reconstructing museum specimen data ===
This project which examines trade processes to reconstruct and understand the mechanisms of natural history trade.

=== Revision of the dottyback fish subfamily Pseudoplesiopinae ===
The Pseudoplesiopinae is a subfamily of small coral-reef fishes found throughout the Indo-Pacific. The study aims to determine species within the subfamily and investigate their phylogenetic relationships.

=== Woodhouse Archive Flickr Project ===
In July 2017, the museum launched a crowdsourcing project to help identify and catalogue the Woodhouse Photographic Archive of glass-plate negatives taken in Greece during the 1890s and early 1900s.

== Publications ==
The museum has published a biannual magazine, Muse, since 2012. The magazine has won design awards from Museums Australia.

Other publications include:

- Chen, S., & Kim, M.-J. (Eds.). (2024). Chinese toggles: Culture in miniature. Power Publications. ISBN 978-0-909952-24-2
- Conway, R. (Ed.). (2021). Djalkiri: Yolngu art, collaborations and collections. Sydney University Press. ISBN 9781743327272
- Ellis, David (2020). Director's choice. Chau Chak Wing Museum. London: Scala Arts & Heritage Publishers Ltd. ISBN 9781785511134
- Fraser, J., Lord, C., & Magnussen, J. (Eds.). (2022). Speak my name: Investigating Egyptian mummies. Sydney University Press. ISBN 9781743328460
- Stephens, Ann (Ed.). (2021). Light & Darkness: Late Modernism and the JW Power Collection. Power Publications. ISBN 9780909952020
