= Melanella amabilis =

Scientific classification
- Kingdom: Animalia
- Phylum: Mollusca
- Class: Gastropoda
- Subclass: Caenogastropoda
- Order: Littorinimorpha
- Family: Eulimidae
- Genus: Melanella
- Species: M. amabilis

Binomial name
- Melanella amabilis (Brazier, 1877)

Synonyms
- Eulima amabilis Brazier, 1877

Species of gastropod

Melanella amabilis is a species of sea snail, a marine gastropod mollusk in the family Eulimidae. The species is one of many species known to exist within the genus, Melanella.

== Description ==
(Original description) The shell is subulately (narrowing down into a sharp tip) pyramidal in shape. It is opaque white, polished, solid, and only slightly curved. It consists of ten convex whorls. A slight varix occurs on the right side of the first and second whorls. The suture is distinct, and the spire is straight. The aperture is oblong-ovate. The columella is thickened and projects below, while the outer lip is strongly thickened in the middle but remains thin along its edge.

== Distribution ==
This marine shell is endemic to Australia and occurs off Queensland.
