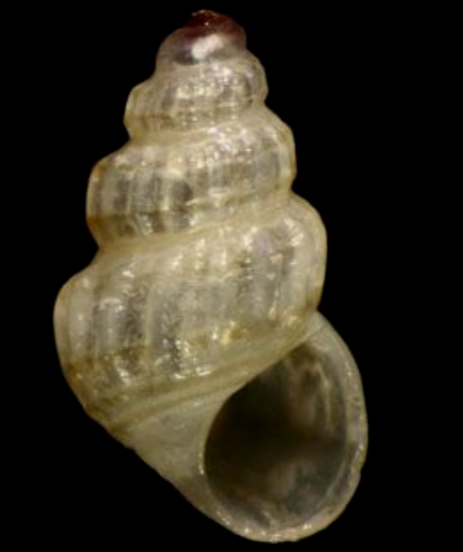
- Shell of Alvania strangei (specimen at the Natural History Museum, Rotterdam)

Scientific classification
- Kingdom: Animalia
- Phylum: Mollusca
- Class: Gastropoda
- Subclass: Caenogastropoda
- Order: Littorinimorpha
- Superfamily: Rissooidea
- Family: Rissoidae
- Genus: Alvania
- Species: A. strangei

Binomial name
- Alvania strangei (Brazier, 1894)

Synonyms
- Alvania tatei Thiele, 1930 (junior synonym); Rissoa (Apicularia) strangei Henn, A.U. & Brazier, J.W. 1894; Rissoa lineata Petterd, 1884 (invalid: secondary junior homonym of Alvania lineata Risso, 1826); Rissoia (Apicularia) strangei Brazier, 1894 (Rissoia incorrect subsequent spelling of Rissoa; Alvania accepted as genus)

= Alvania strangei =

Species of gastropod

Alvania strangei is a species of small sea snail, a marine gastropod mollusk or micromollusk in the family Rissoidae.

== Description ==
The length of the shell attains 2.2 mm, its diameter 1 mm.

(Original description) The minute, rather solid shell is imperforate and turbinately conoid. It is whitish, faintly light banded with light brown. It contains 5½ whorls. The apical whorls are smooth. The others are longitudinally strongly ribbed, ending at the periphery. The interstices are smooth and slightly noduled at the sutures, which are rather deep. The base of the shell is convex and has three strong raised spiral lines. The aperture is subcircular. The outer lip is rather thin. The white columella is thickened.

== Distribution ==
This species is endemic to Australia and occurs off New South Wales, South Australia, Tasmania, Victoria and Western Australia
