= Great Hall of the University of Sydney =

Building in Sydney, New South Wales, Australia

The Great Hall of the University of Sydney
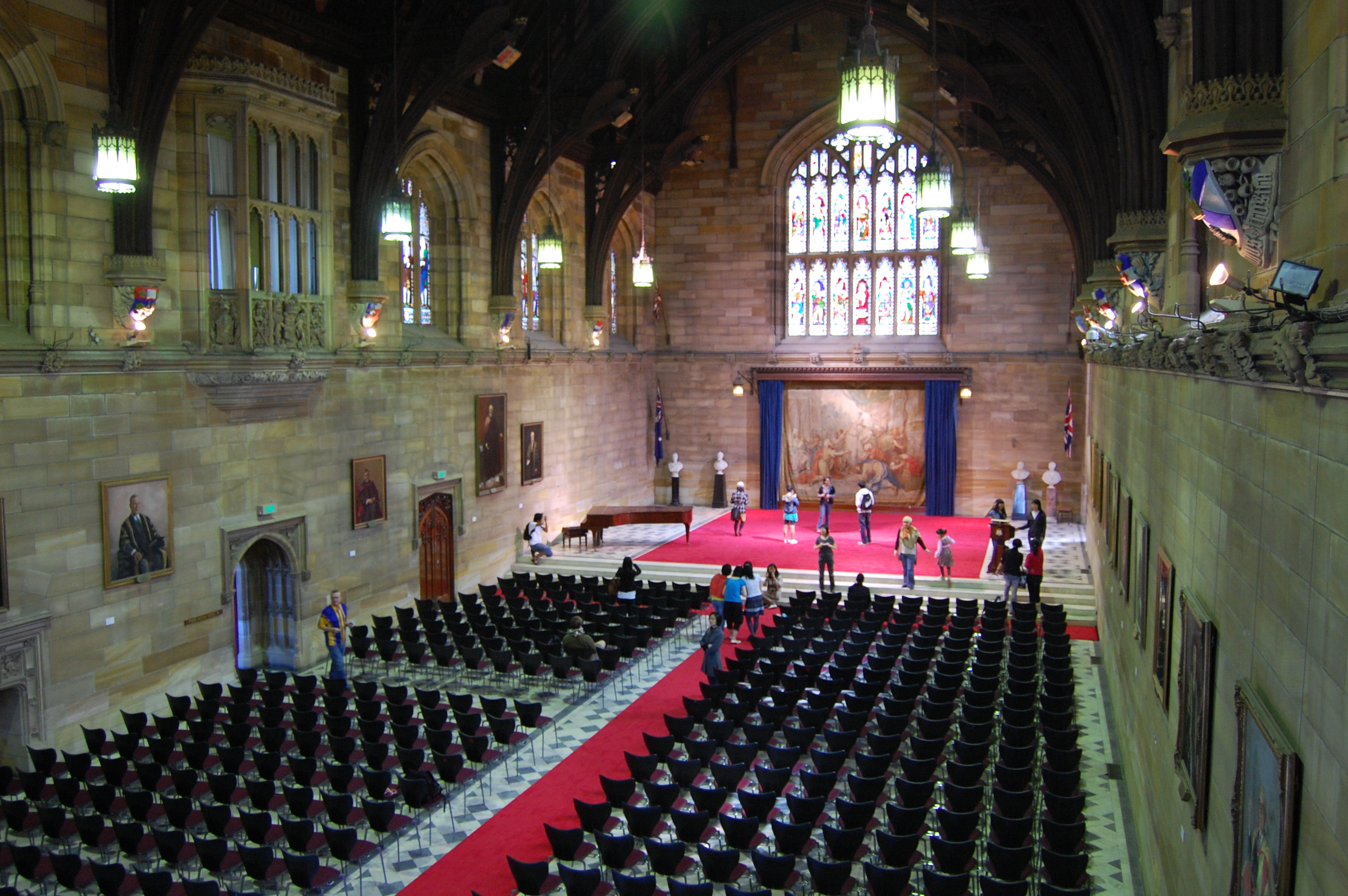
- The interior of the Great Hall
- Interactive map of the The Great Hall of the University of Sydney area

General information
- Status: Completed
- Architectural style: Victorian Academic Gothic revival
- Location: Main Quadrangle, The University of Sydney, Camperdown Campus, Sydney, New South Wales, Australia
- Coordinates: 33°53′07″S 151°11′20″E
- Construction started: 1855
- Completed: July 1859
- Owner: The University of Sydney

Technical details
- Material: Sydney sandstone; Cedar timber beams; Hammerbeam roof; Marble flooring

Design and construction
- Architects: Edmund Blacket (1855-1859); James Barnet (Clerk of Works); T. E. O’Mahony
- Other designers: Rudolf von Beckerath (1972 organ); Ronald Sharp (1972 organ)
- Known for: Stained-glass windows, gables and gargoyles

Website
- sydney.edu.au/engage/visit/places-of-interest/great-hall.html

New South Wales Heritage Database (Local Government Register)
- Official name: Main Quad / East Range and Great Hall
- Type: Local government (built)
- Designated: 1999
- Reference no.: 4726003
- Group: Education
- Category: University
- Builders: Holmes & Coney; John Donovan & Robert Melville; A & S Loveridge; W. Elphinstone; W. H. Hudson & Sons

The Great Hall of the University of Sydney, is one of the principal structures of The University of Sydney, New South Wales, Australia, with a public interior used for formal ceremonies, conferences, recitals and dinners. The Hall, located in the Main Quadrangle on the Camperdown campus, is a symbol of the university's stately history and an excellent example of Victorian Academic Gothic revival architecture. Completed in July 1859, the Great Hall soon became a tourist attraction; the writer Anthony Trollope wrote home in 1874 that the Hall was "the finest chamber in the colonies", and that no college of Oxford or Cambridge possessed a hall "of which the proportions are so good".

The Great Hall, Main Quadrangle and the East Range of the University of Sydney were listed on the City of Sydney local government heritage list in 1999; where the collection of buildings are described as ".... probably the most significant group of Gothic Revival Buildings in Australia."

== History ==
Designed by Sir Edmund Thomas Blacket (1817–1883), the Great Hall lies at the most northeastern point of the university Quadrangle - dominating the sweeping lawns of University Place, as well as University Avenue, which overlooks Victoria Park. Blacket was appointed Colonial Architect of New South Wales from 1849 to 1854. He resigned from this position in 1855 to pursue the design of new buildings for the university - supervising both their development, and construction, until their completion in 1862. Blacket's other notable achievements include the design of St. Paul's College and the alteration of the original construction of St. Andrew's Cathedral in Sydney, from architect James Hume's original design.

The Great Hall was completed in July 1859, and represents one of Blacket's finest accomplishments. On 18 July 1859, degrees were first conferred upon graduates by the university in a formal ceremony in the Hall.

=== Organ ===
During 1881–1882, a Forster & Andrews pipe organ was installed, later to be replaced in 1972 by the present organ, manufactured by Rudolf von Beckerath of Hamburg, Germany; and installed with the assistance of Ronald Sharp.

The organ has three manuals and pedals, a mechanical key and electric stop action, 54 stops, 79 ranks and 4005 pipes. The cedar case was constructed in the university's Joinery Shop, and blends with the architecture of the Great Hall. Looking towards the organ, the three manual and pedal console can be seen on the left. Above it are large principal pipes from the Great division (middle keyboard), with the rest of the Great pipes situated immediately behind these display pipes. Above the Great is the Swell division (top keyboard), which is the expressive section of the instrument enclosed in a large wooden box with front shutters operated by the Swell pedal at the console. In the centre of the gallery, jutting out into the hall, is the Ruckpositiv division (bottom keyboard), and on the right side, the Pedal division.

== Architecture ==
The Great Hall is recognised as one of the finest examples of the Victorian Gothic revival style of architecture in Australia, in a design that reflects, and harmoniously complements the University Quadrangle of which it forms part. A feature of the Great Hall is the sloped roof, built in hammerbeam style to resemble that of Westminster Hall in London. The arched design of the roof is supported by six collar cedar beams, and is architecturally reminiscent of such British interiors as those of Stirling Castle, Hampton Court and Etham Castle, all equally typical of Gothic constructions.

Twelve carved wooden figures of angels are located among the beams holding items that reference the arts and sciences – Grammar has a papyrus roll, Dialectic has Aristotle's diagram of the three syllogistic figures, Poetry has a harp, Ethics has a St Mary's lily, Metaphysics has a symbol of the Deity, Arithmetic has an abacus, Geometry has the 47th proposition of the first book of Euclid, Astronomy has a star, Music has a lyre, and Physics has an ancient air pump. An angel of knowledge originally sat atop the eastern gable, however was removed in 1874.

The marble floor, elevated upon the western side of the hall, mirrors the dais found in Westminster Hall, upon which the throne of King Richard II stood. The armorial bearings upon the southern side of the Hall, as well as the frame of the Oriel window, have been carved of Caen stone. The walls are otherwise constructed of Sydney sandstone, with a floor of marble.

== Gallery ==
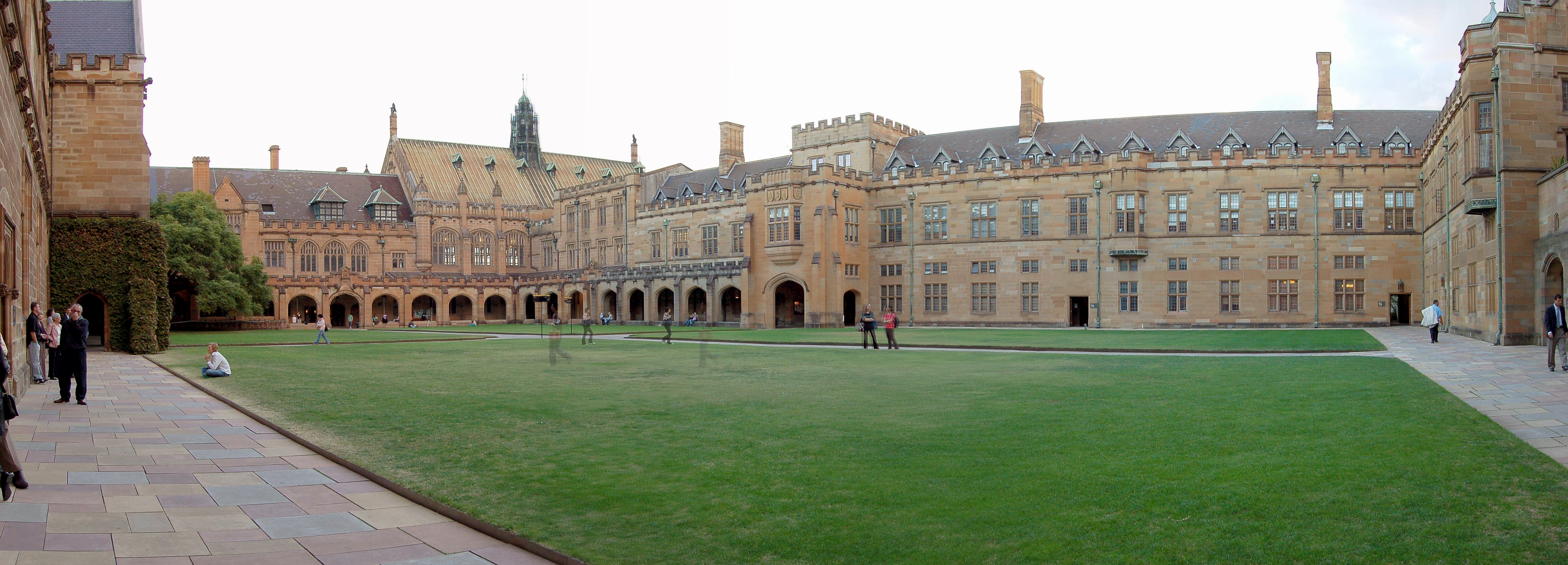
The Main Quadrangle, the University of Sydney, viewed from Great Hall

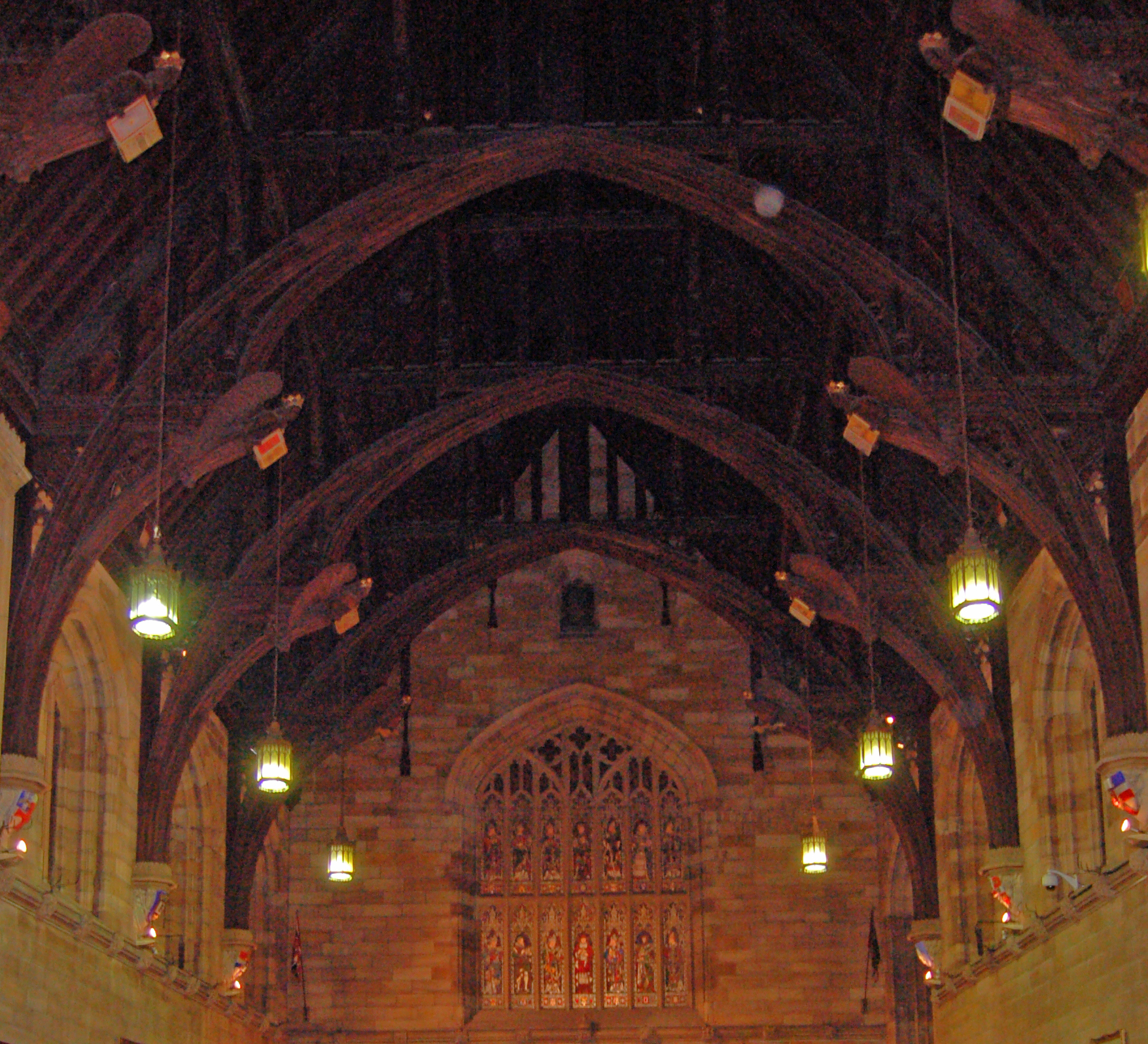
The arched roof of the Great Hall

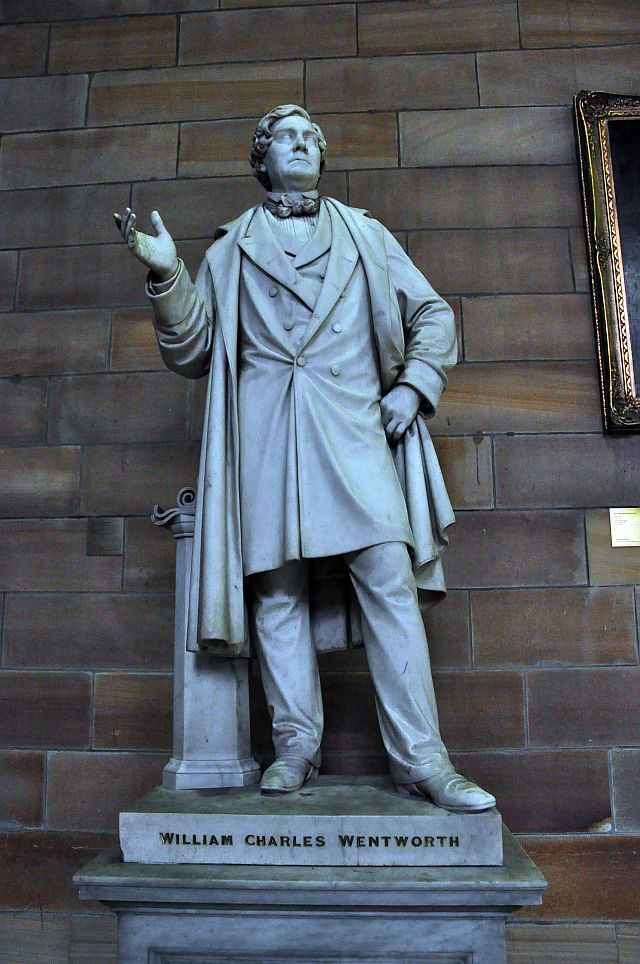
Statue of William Wentworth

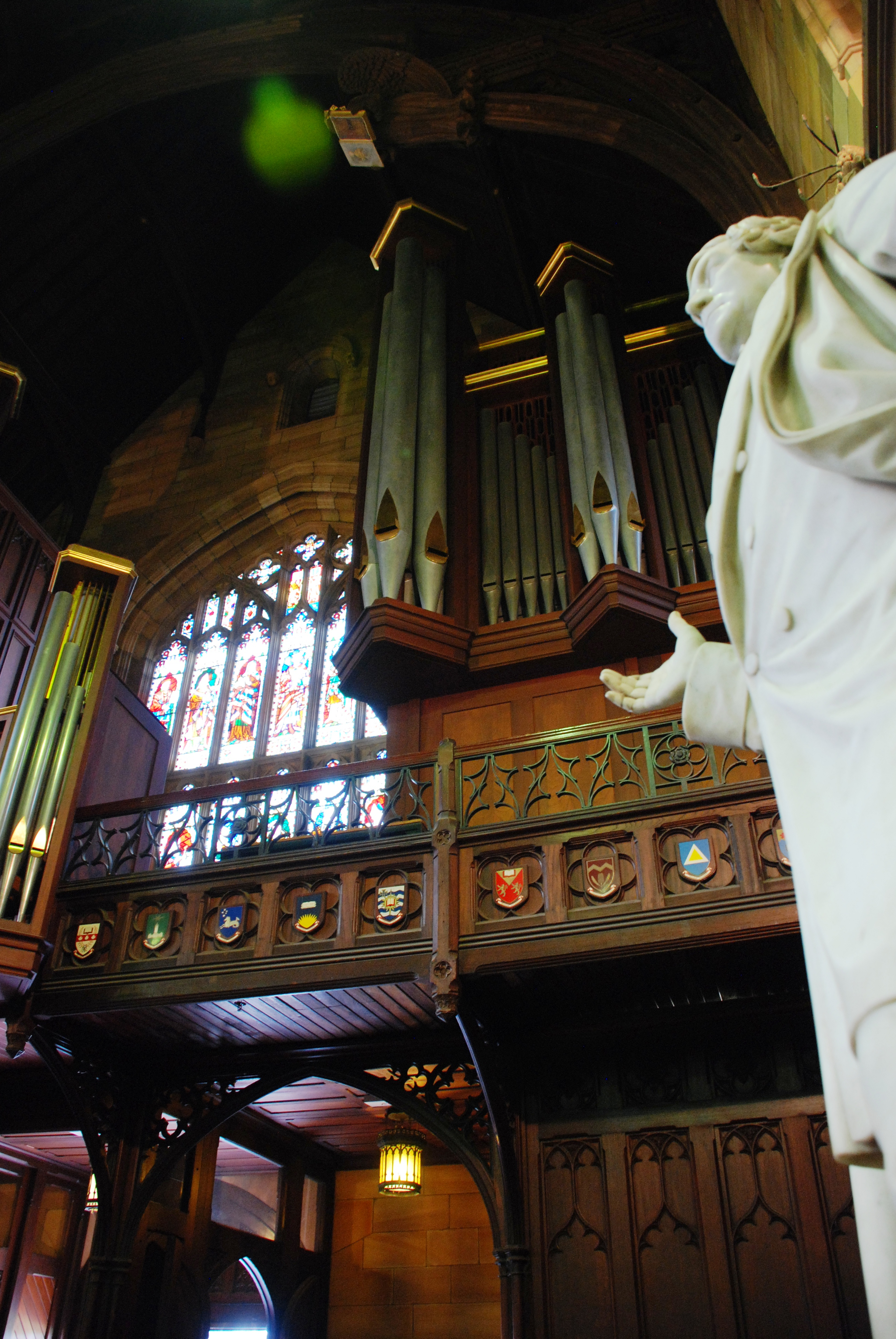

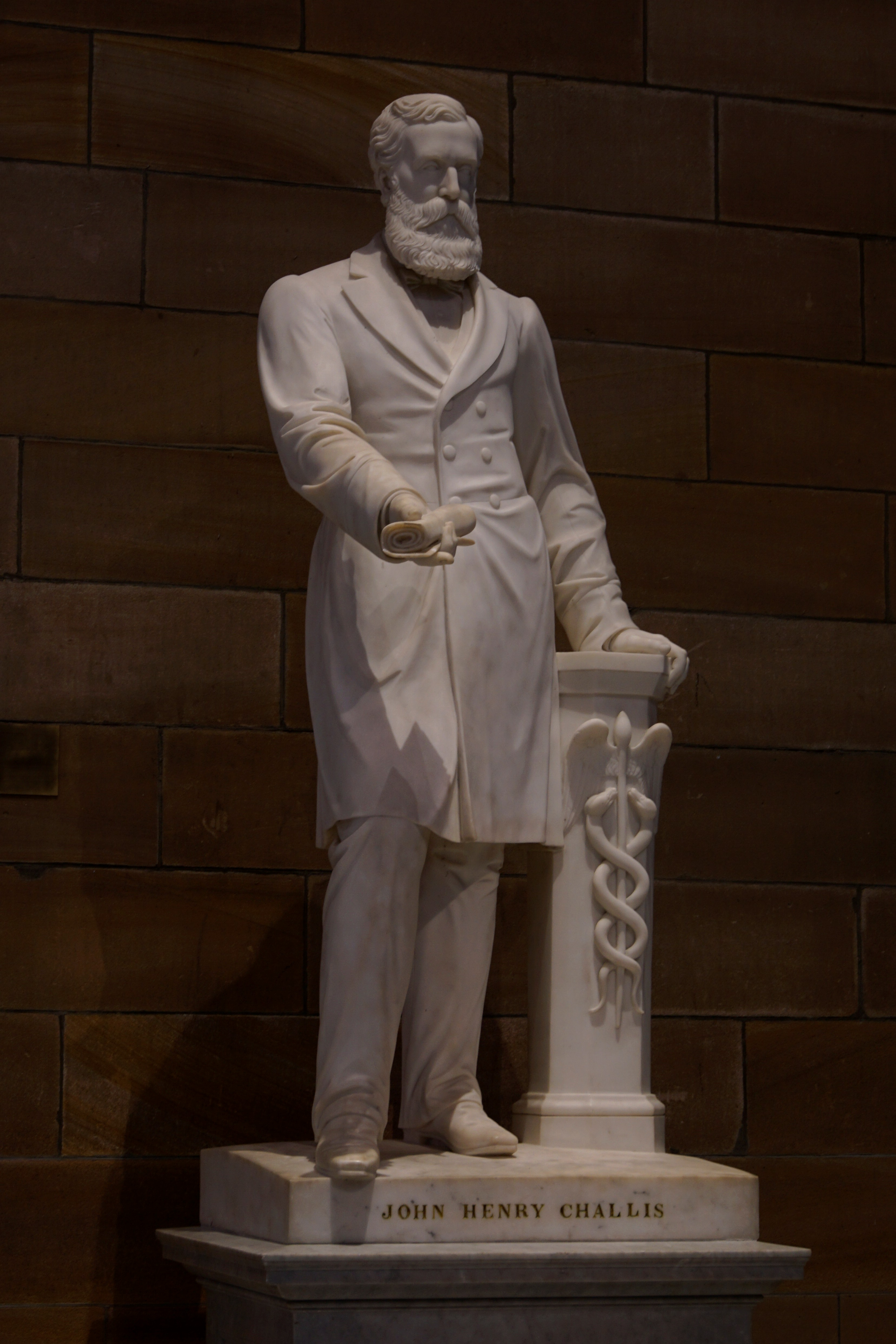
John Henry Challis

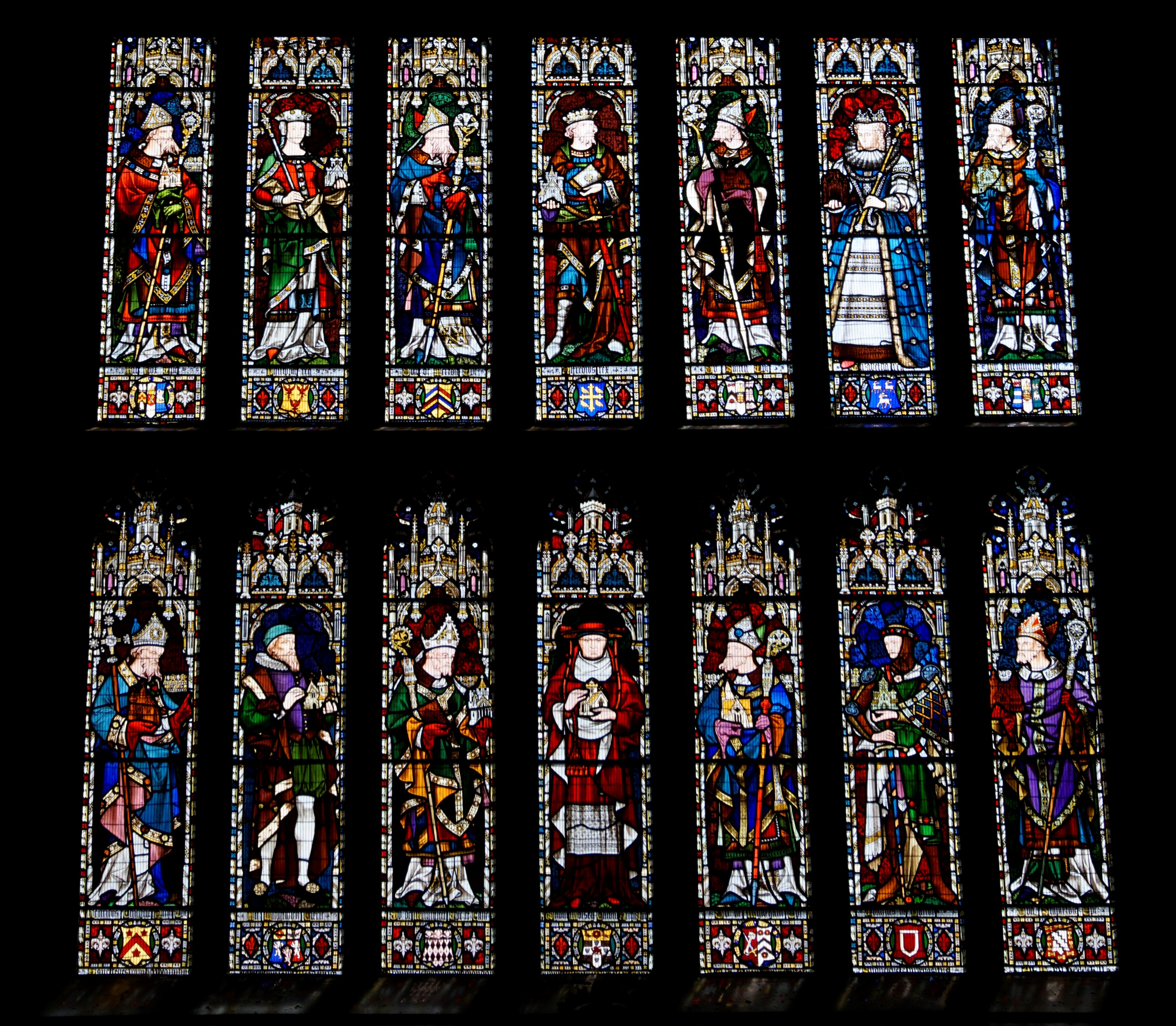
Oxford Window

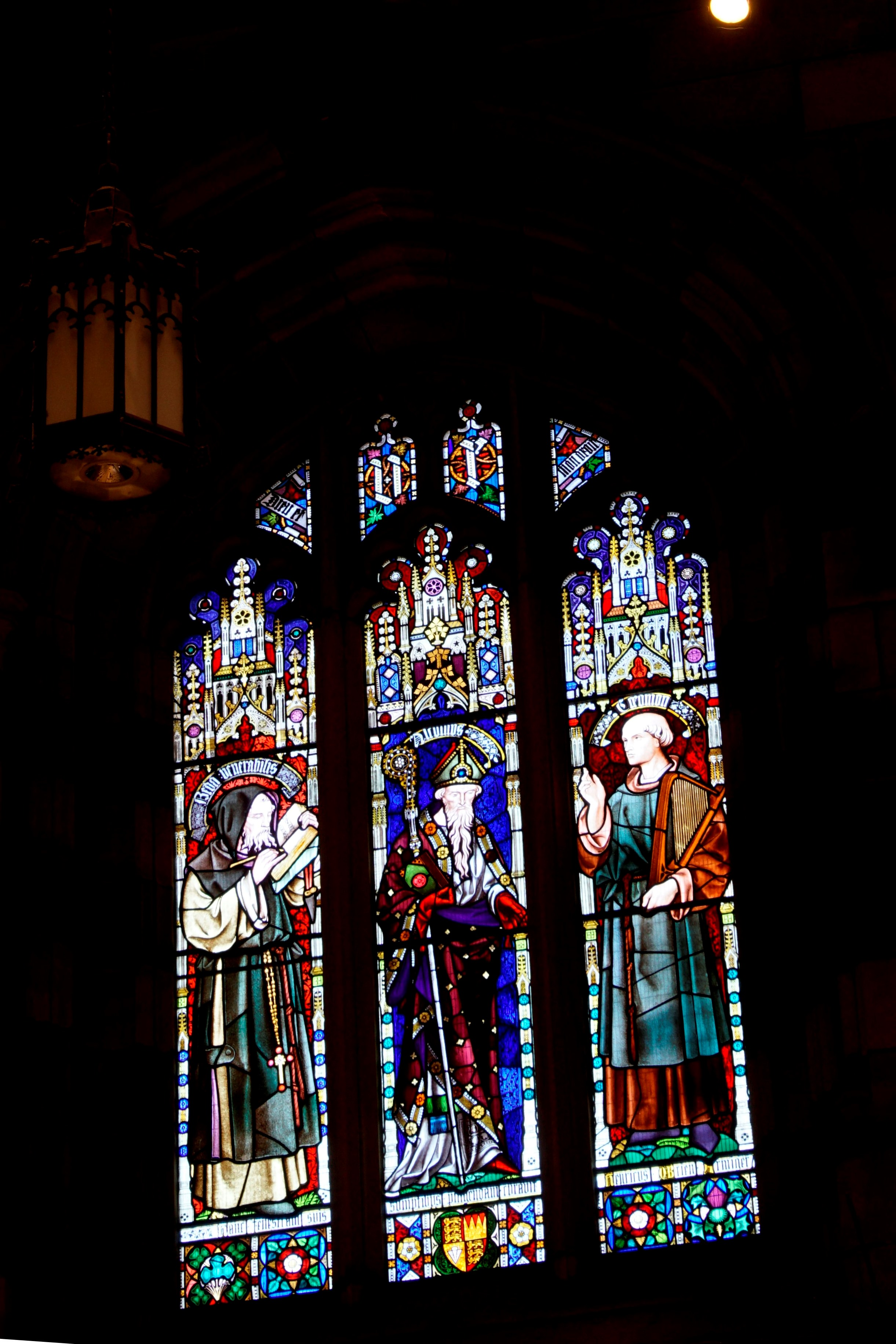
Window I

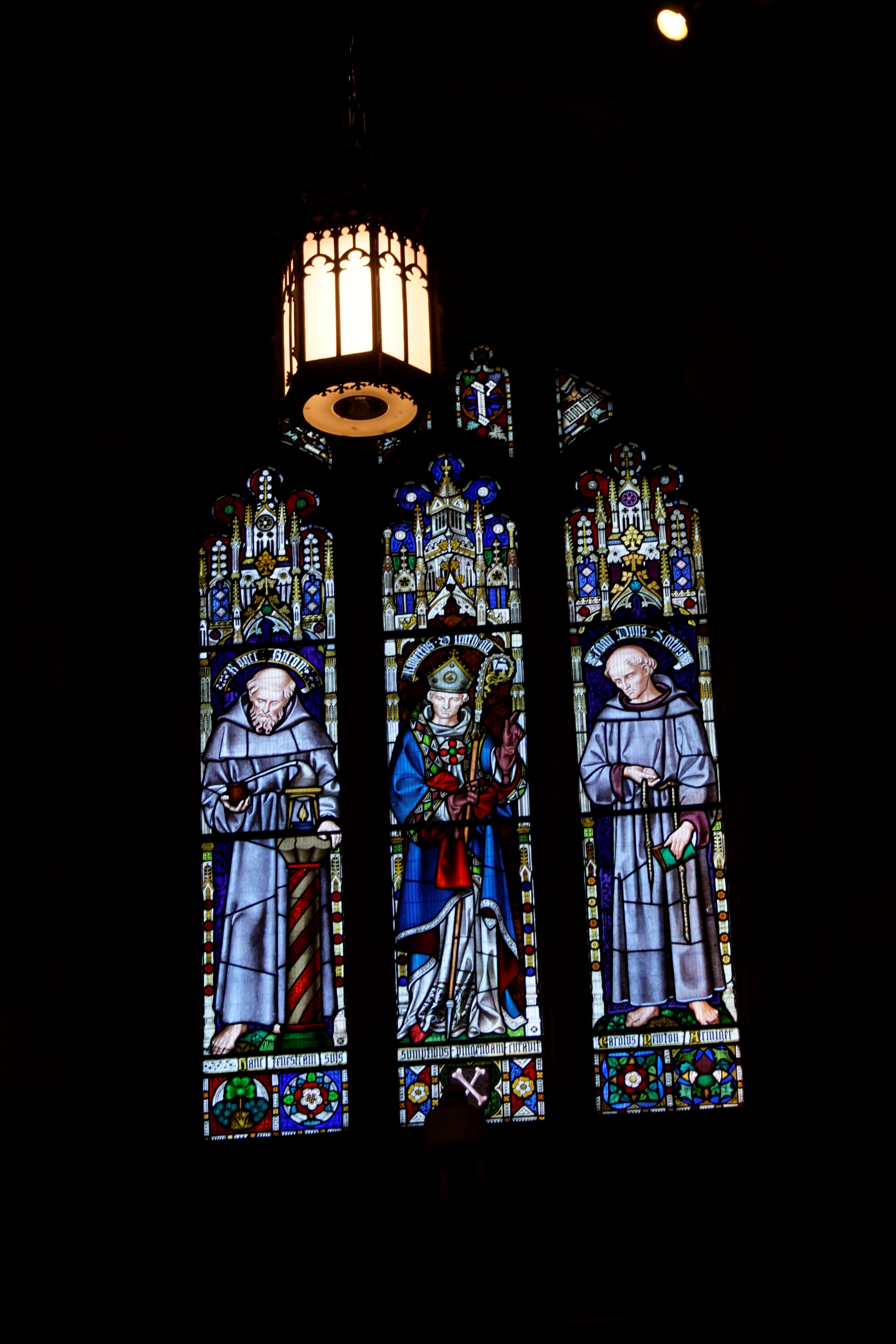
Window II

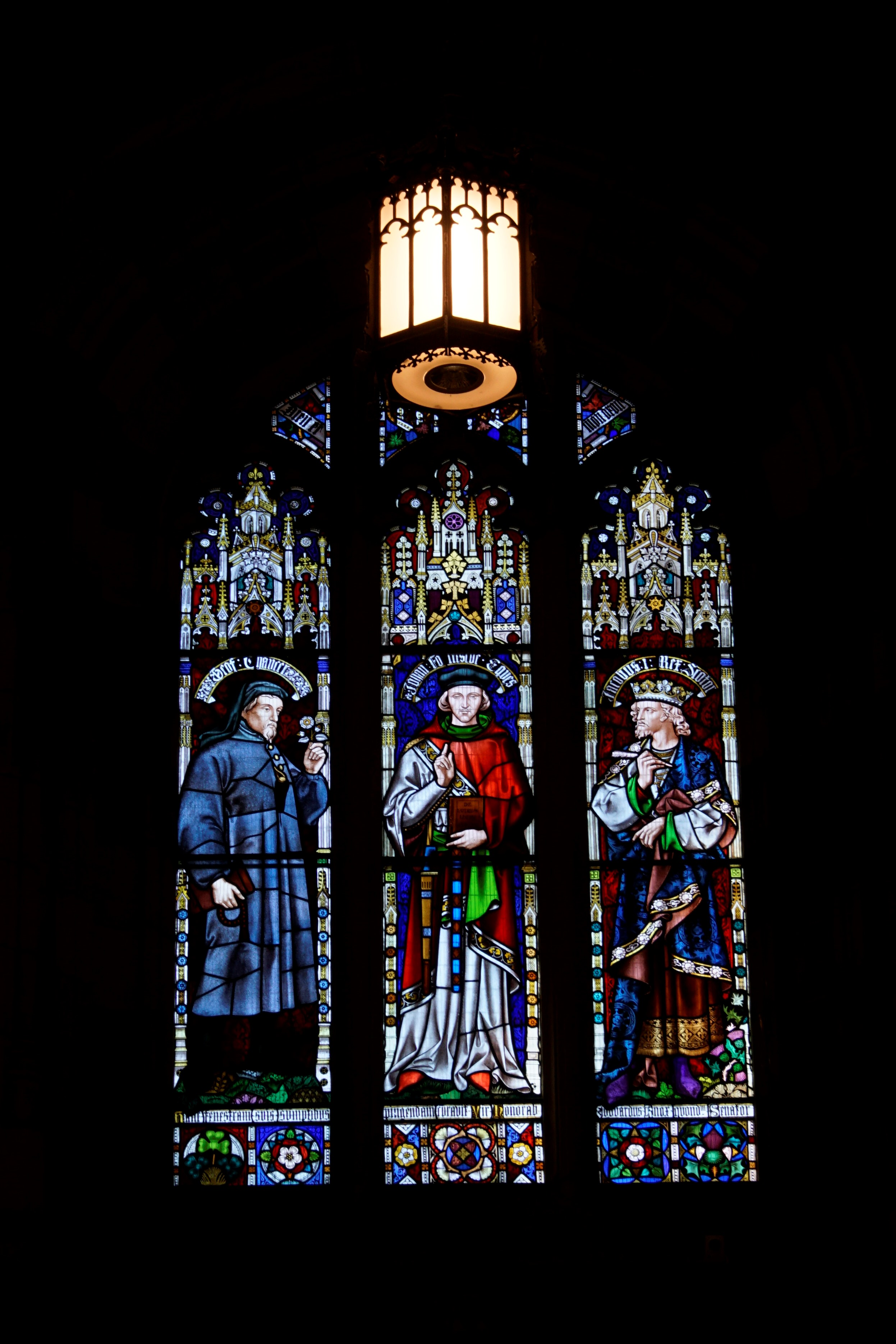
Window III

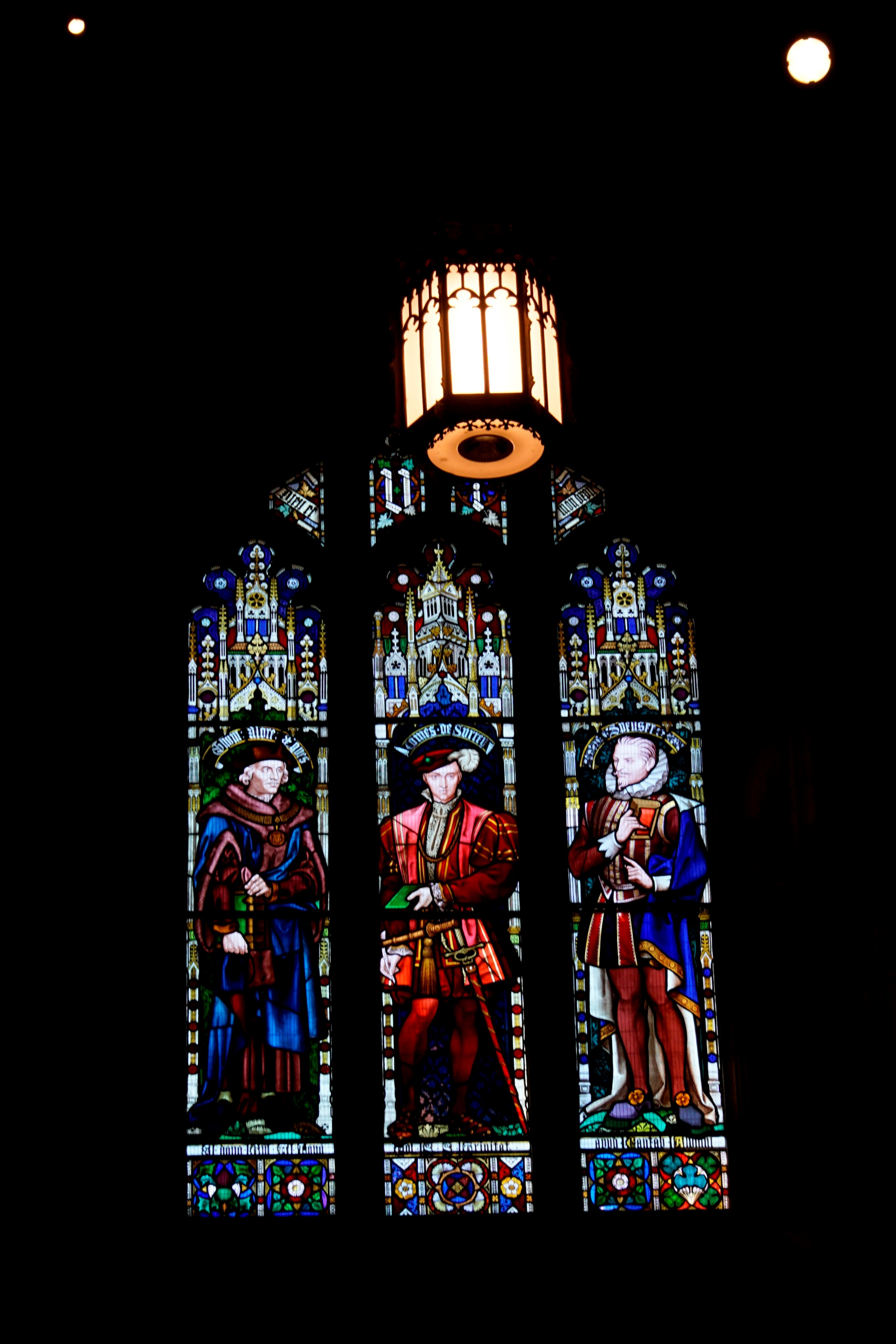
Window IV

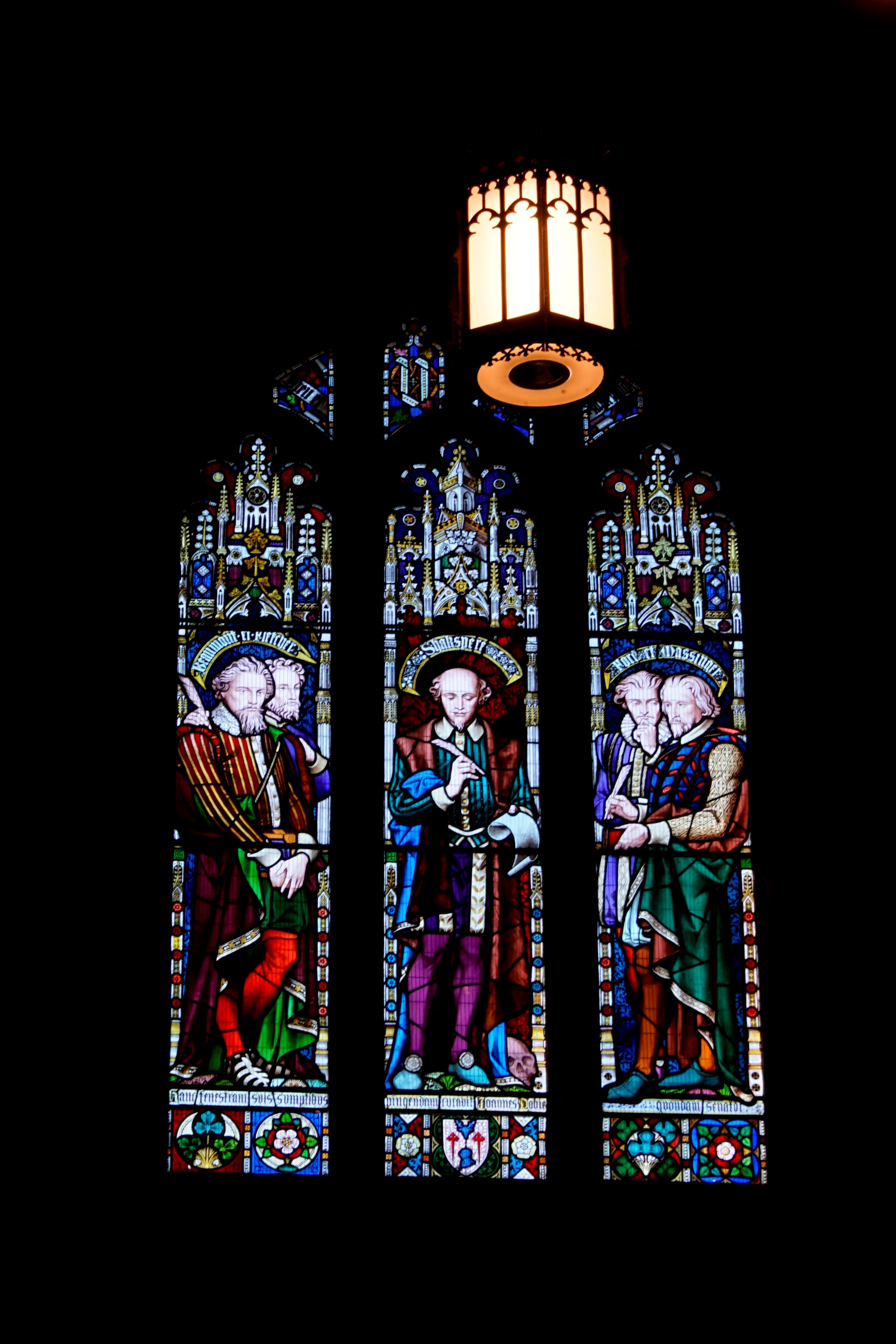
Window V

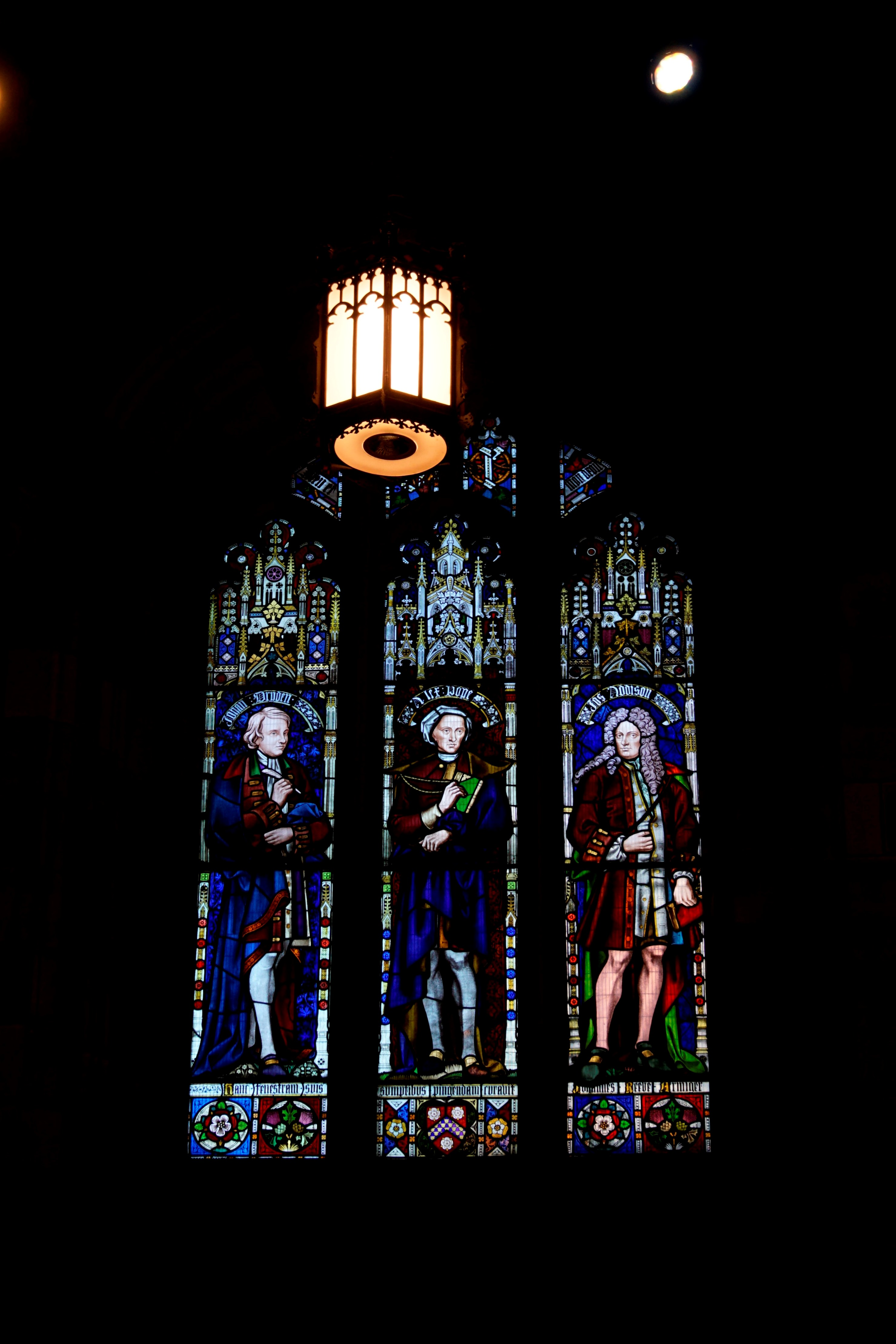
Window VIII

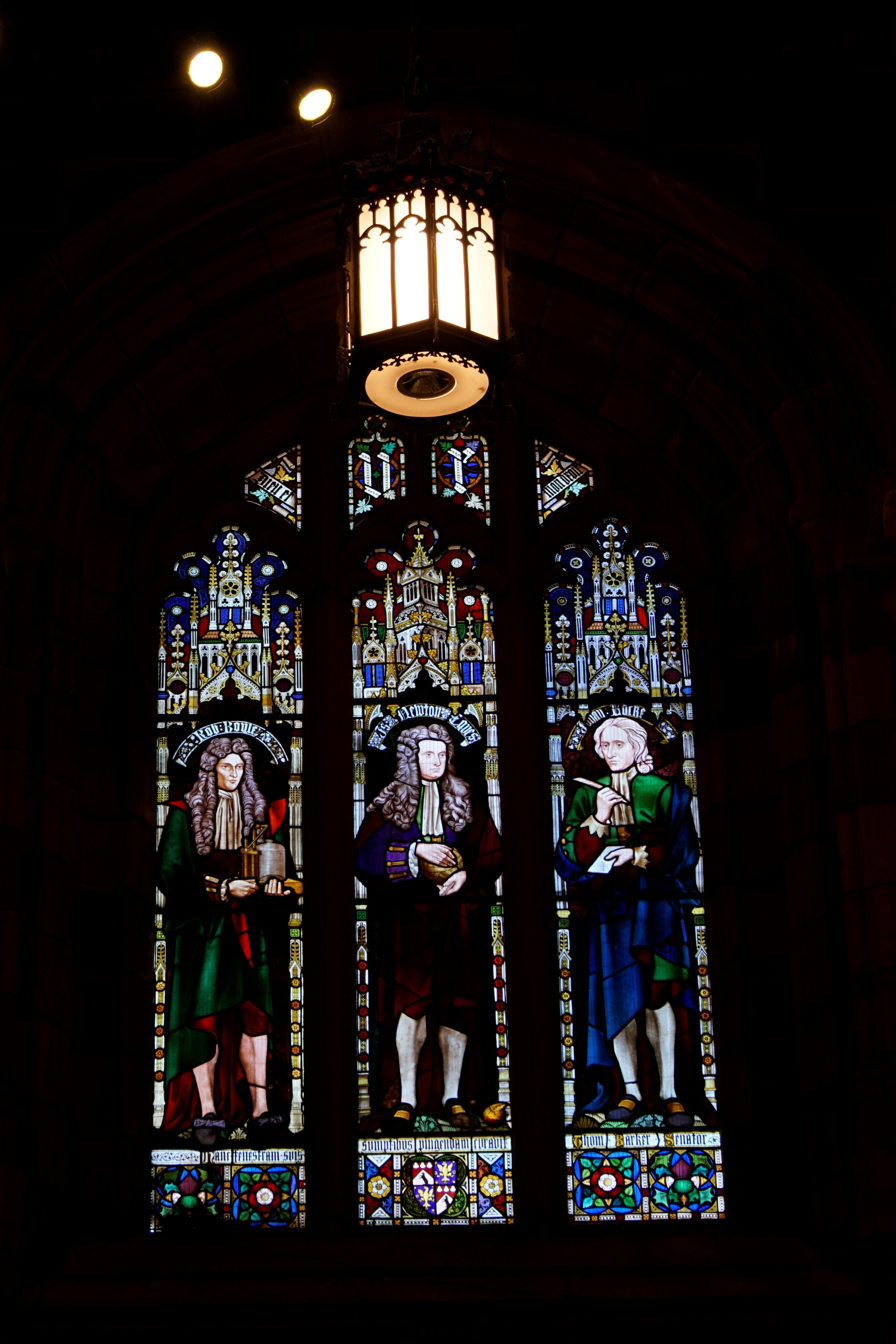
Window IX

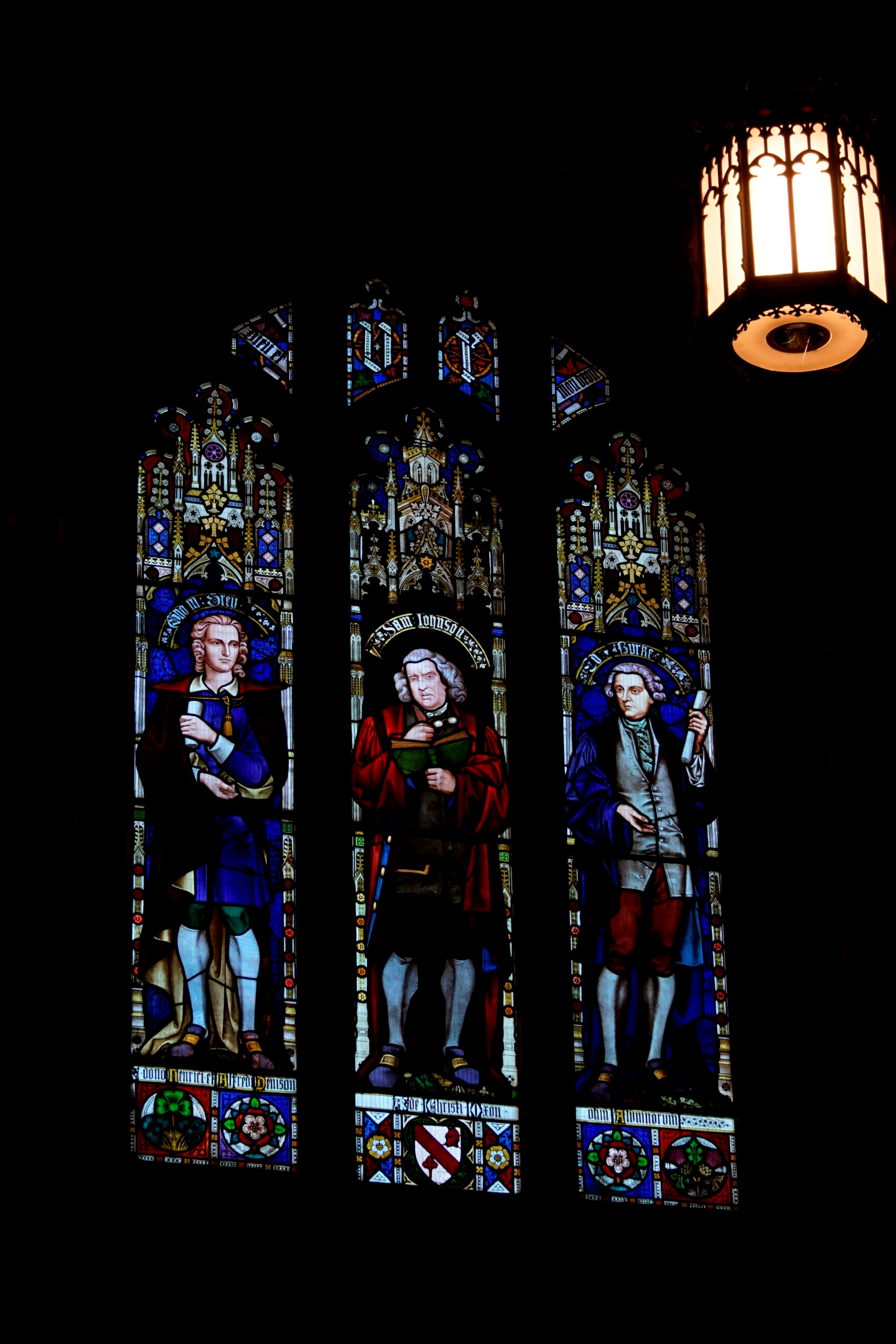
Window X

== See also ==
- List of Edmund Blacket buildings
- Architecture of Australia
