= Nicholson Museum =

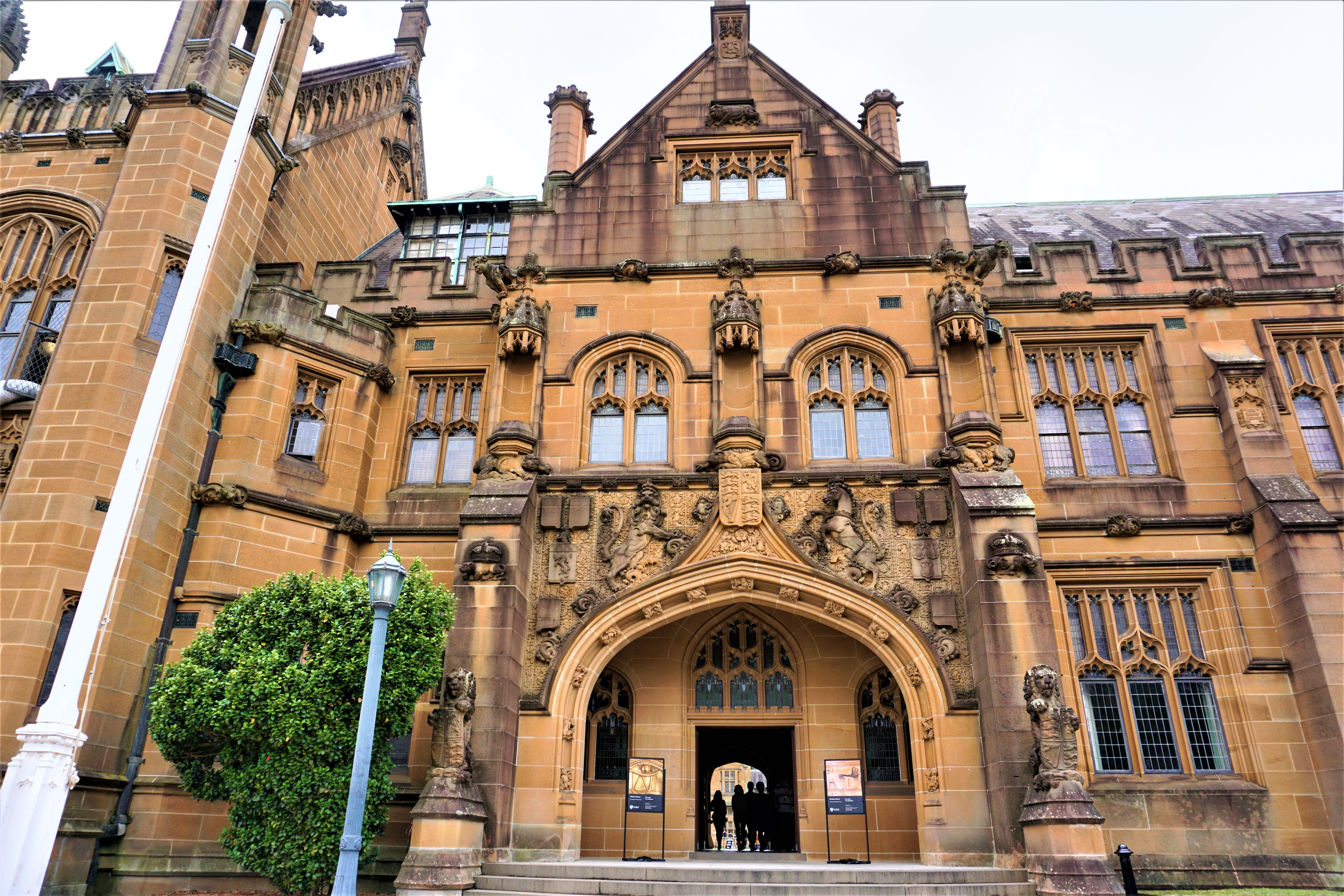
- Entrance to the Nicholson Museum in the University of Sydney Quadrangle
- Former name: Museum of Antiquities
- Established: 1860
- Dissolved: 28 February 2020
- Location: University of Sydney Quadrangle, Parramatta Road, Camperdown, New South Wales, Australia
- Coordinates: 33°53′11″S 151°11′20″E
- Type: Archaeological museum
- Collections: Egyptian; Cypriot; Greek; Italy; Near Eastern
- Collection size: 30,000+
- Founder: Sir Charles Nicholson
- Director, University Museums: David Ellis (2013-2020)
- Owner: The University of Sydney

The Nicholson Museum was an archaeological museum at the University of Sydney home to the Nicholson Collection, the largest collection of antiquities in both Australia and the Southern Hemisphere. Founded in 1860, the collection spans the ancient world with primary collection areas including ancient Egypt, Greece, Italy, Cyprus, and the Near East. The museum closed permanently in February 2020, and the Nicholson Collection is now housed in the Chau Chak Wing Museum at the University of Sydney, open from November 2020. The museum was located in the main quadrangle of the University.

== Introduction ==
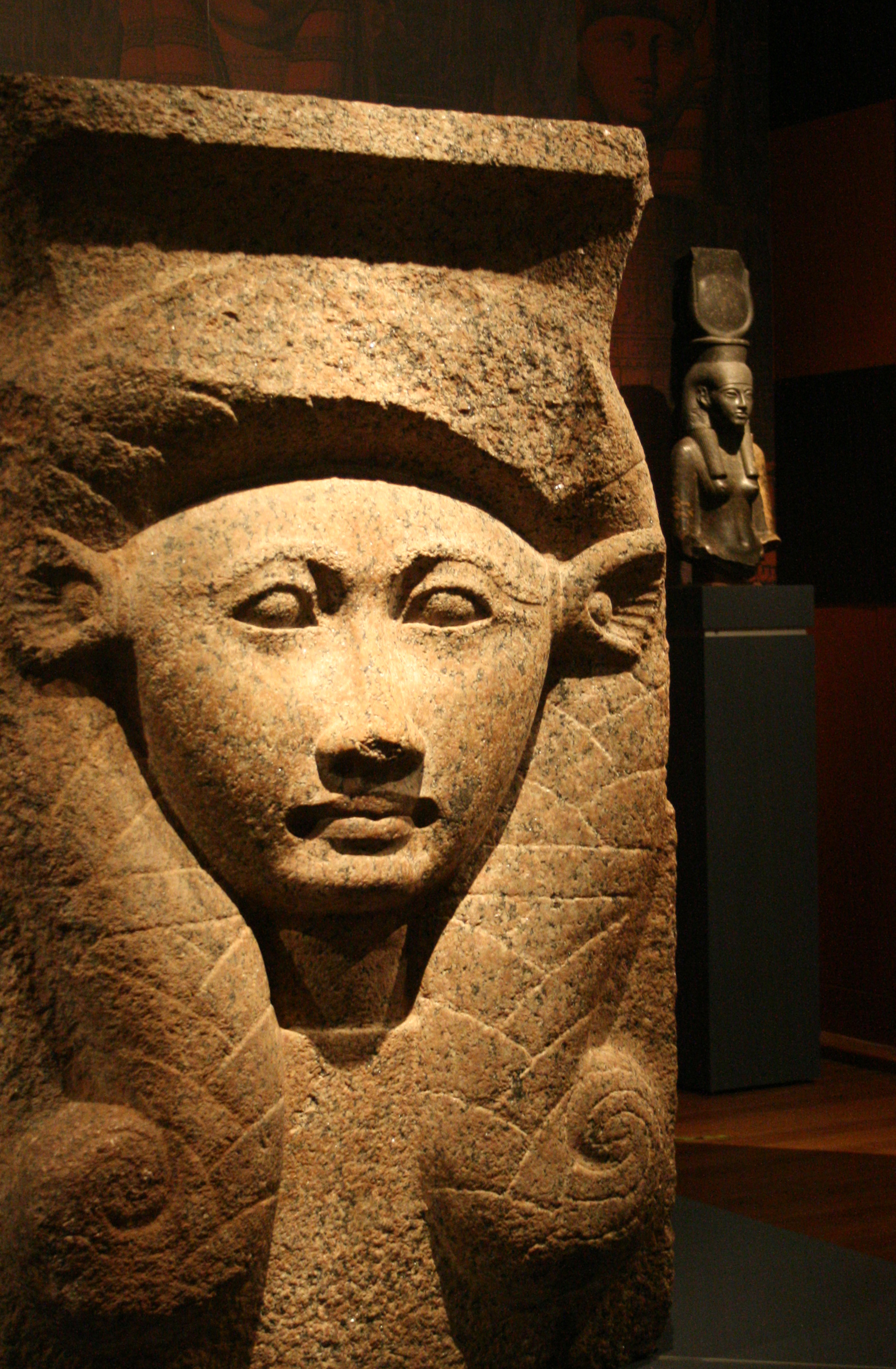
Hathor capital from the Temple of Bubastis on display in the Nicholson Museum

The Nicholson Museum was named after its founder, Sir Charles Nicholson. In 1856-57, Nicholson traveled throughout Egypt and then Italy where he acquired the first thousand or so primarily ancient Egyptian, Greek, South Italian and Etruscan artefacts. These he donated to the University in 1860. The museum's collection grew exponentially since this founding donation. Individual benefaction, donations, sponsored archaeological projects and curatorial acquisition have all contributed to the wealth of material in the Nicholson Collection.

The museum had a mixture of permanent and temporary exhibition areas within its gallery. Permanent or ongoing exhibitions included: Egyptians, Gods and Mummies: Travels with Herodotus, Aphrodite's Island: Australian Archaeologists in Cyprus; The Etruscans: A Classical Fantasy; Tombs, Tells and Temples: Excavating the Near East as well as a permanent display of artefacts from the Greek and Italian Classical world. Temporary exhibitions included: LEGO Pompeii, featuring a large scale model of the site of Pompeii in LEGO and 50 Objects, 50 Stories – which was moved to Chau Chak Wing Museum upon the closing of Nicholson.

The Nicholson Museum, along with its sister institutions, the Macleay Museum and the University Art Gallery, were united under a single director, David Ellis, in 2003 to form Sydney University Museums. In 2005, Michael Turner was appointed Senior Curator.

== Permanent collections ==
The permanent collections of the Nicholson Museum spanned the ancient world with primary collection areas including the Classical world of Greece and Italy, Egypt, Cyprus, the Near East and Northern Europe from the Neolithic to Medieval periods. The Collection also includes a significant historic photograph collection of over 1,350 glass negatives taken by former curator William J. Woodhouse.

=== Egyptian collection ===
The ancient Egyptian collection included artefacts from a variety of ancient sites including Abydos, Alexandria, Bubastis, Fayum, Heliopolis, Memphis, Saqqara, and Thebes. Egyptian material formed a large part of Sir Charles Nicholson's founding donation. He traveled throughout Egypt between 1856 and 1857 purchasing artefacts from dealers in Cairo and Luxor as well as collecting artefacts straight from sites, including Karnak where he collected a fragment of a red granite thought to be from Hatshepsut's obelisk.

=== Cypriot collection ===
Beginning in 1860 with a single artefact from the original donation by Sir Charles Nicholson, the collection grew exponentially, especially under the curatorial direction of firstly William Woodhouse (honorary curator 1903-1938) and then James Stewart (honorary curator 1954-1962). Many of the artefacts within the collection were sourced directly from Stewart's own excavations conducted at Bellapais Vounous, Karmi Palealona, Karmi Lapasta, Nicosia Ayia Paraskevi and Vasilia Kafkallia as well as from the excavations of at the sites of Myrtou Stephania and Myrtou Sphagion, conducted by Stewart's former student Basil Hennessy, who later became Professor of Near Eastern Archaeology at the University of Sydney. As a result of these acquisitions, the Museum held many complete tomb groups of archaeological importance.

=== Greek collection ===
The Nicholson Collection's Greek collections contains artefacts representative of the material culture of the Greek mainland, islands and surrounding regions, from the Bronze Age through to the Late Hellenistic period. During Sir Charles Nicholson's travels to Egypt and Europe between 1856 and 1858 he acquired, primarily in Rome, a range of Classical and Hellenistic Greek ceramics as well as terracotta figurines. In total over seventy significant Greek artefacts were included in the founding donation of the Nicholson Museum. Further material, representative of the Greek mainland and islands, was bought during the curatorship of A. D. Trendall. His proactive acquisition program involved purchasing a wide range of ceramic types of Greek origin as well as significant contributions of sherd material for teaching purposes sought from prominent museums and individual collectors and scholars, including Sir John Beazley. The collection was then expanded following a donation of hundreds of pottery fragments and small votive objects by the family of former curator William J Woodhouse in 1948. The majority of this material is thought to have been collected during Woodhouse's 1890s and 1930s trips to Greece, documented in the Woodhouse photographic collection.

=== Italian collection ===
The Italian collection is representative of the diversity of the ancient Italian world with significant cultural material from Etruria, South Italy and the Roman World. From the museum's foundation the cultures of ancient Italy have been strongly represented in the collection. Sir Charles Nicholson spent considerable time in Rome collecting Latin inscriptions, Etruscan funerary urns and bronzes, South Italian vases and Roman lamps, figurines and ceramics. Additional large sculptural works were also acquired by Sir Charles including two life-sized togatus statues along with several fragmentary figures. The Italian collection was further developed with the acquisition of a significant corpus of South Italian vases by A.D. Trendall during his curatorial tenure. Many of the significant pieces from the South Italian collection were comprehensively published in the first Corpus Vasorum Antiquorum of an Australian collection.

=== Near Eastern collection ===
The Nicholson Museum's collection of Near Eastern artefacts represented many of the great cities and civilisations that flourished along the Levantine coast, across Mesopotamia and through to Pakistan and India. The Near Eastern collection began with just a handful of artefacts from Ur, donated by the British Museum in 1926. This was greatly expanded upon in the mid 20th century by the acquisition program of the curators A.D. Trendall and his successor James Stewart. Both curators wrote countless letters to museums and government agencies around the world requesting representative samples of artefacts to ensure the Nicholson Museum's holdings reflected the diversity of this expansive region. The University of Sydney also contributed financially to archaeological excavations and projects in the Near East, most notably Dame Kathleen Kenyon’s excavations at Jericho. In return for the University's support the Nicholson Museum received a consignment of objects at the end of each season including full tomb groups from the Bronze Age and rare finds such as our Neolithic over plastered skull. Other items have been acquired through generous donations of individual archaeologists, including Sir Leonard Woolley and Sir Flinders Petrie, as well as from archaeological institutes, museums and private donors.

== Temporary exhibitions ==
=== LEGO Pompeii ===
A modern display of Pompeii built with LEGO was featured in Nicholson museum. Professional LEGO builder Ryan McNaught assembled the work. The display showed Pompeii as it was the moment of destruction, as it was when rediscovered, and as it is today. The exhibit appears to be an attempt to appeal to contemporary audiences, and especially a younger generation, including current HSC ancient history students, as Pompeii is an early part of the curriculum taught. Upon seeing the exhibit it is apparent that a lot of work has gone into it (around 470 hours). The deep red glow – only noticeable from the rear of the piece – foreshadows the eruption of Mount Vesuvius, which destroyed the town. The exhibit attracted new audiences to Nicholson Museum.

== See also ==
- List of museums in Sydney
