= Chevert expedition =

Scientific expedition

- Keywords: Chevert, William John Macleay, zoology, Australia, New Guinea, Torres Strait, mammals, fish, mollusca, reptilia, avifauna
- Project type: Scientific expedition
- Objective: Scientific discovery
- Location: Australia, New Guinea, Torres Strait
- Project coordinator: William Macleay
- Participants: William Macleay, John Brazier, William Frederick Petterd, William Hughes James, Thomas Reedy, Edward Spalding
- Budget: Funding: William John Macleay
- Duration: 18 May 1875 – September 1875

The Chevert expedition was a scientific expedition to collect natural history samples from New Guinea and the Torres Strait. It was led and financed by William John Macleay, the first president of the Linnean Society of New South Wales. Chevert sailed from Sydney on 18 May 1875 and returned in September that year. Scientific specimens collected included approximately 1,000 birds, 800 fish, reptiles, insects, molluscs, plants and ethnographic objects. There are conflicting accounts of the number of crew members who were present during the expedition, with certain sources there were 30 members, and others claiming 31. The scientific personnel on board were Sir William Macleay, John Brazier, William Petterd and Edward Spalding, Thomas Reedy, and William James.

In a journal article titled "Notes on the Zoological Collections made in Torres Straits and New Guinea during the cruise of the Chevert", that was composed five months after Macleay initially embarked upon the expedition, Macleay detailed scientific observations that he believed were notable. In this publication, Macleay notes that the majority of the mammals that he encountered in New Guinea, with minimal anomalies, were marsupials, he outlines similarities between avifauna in New Guinea and in Australia, discusses the abundance of reptilia in New Guinea and the lack thereof in the Torres Strait, and describes his marine mollusca collections. Upon the return of Chevert, critical comments regarding the expedition were promulgated in newspapers due to its short duration, despite an absence of communication regarding the length of the voyage. Further, condemnation was directed as Macleay, as the perception of New Guinea as a suitable colonial endeavour, which was a popular contention at the time, was a notion that he did not engage with. However, contemporary opinions that consider the expedition a scientific success exist.

== Preparations ==
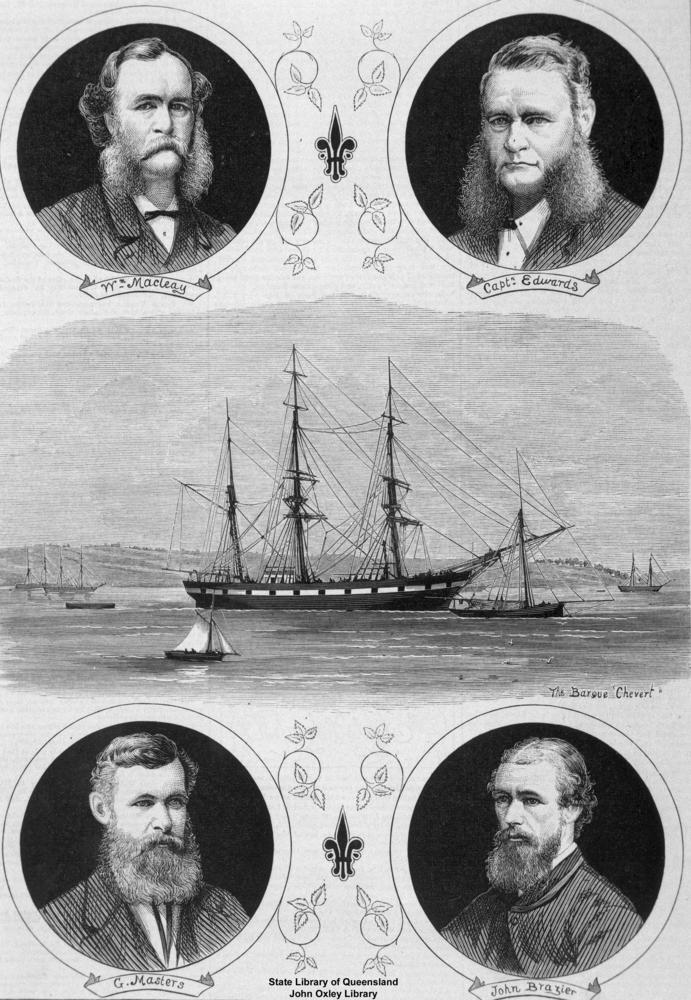
Clockwise from top left: William John Macleay, Capt. Edwards, John Brazier, G. Masters; centre: barque Chevert

Macleay sought ships for his expedition with Captain Edwards, and at Mort's Dock on 22 February 1875, they encountered the barque Chevert. The boat was constructed between 1850 and 1863 and had historically been a transport vessel used for colonial advancement under the rule of both the English and French within the Pacific and Indian Ocean. The surveyor who examined the boat provided positive feedback, and Macleay bought it in early 1875 for £3000. The barque was then adjusted and rectified to suit Macleay’s unique expeditionary requirements. In further preparation, guns and additional apparatus were organised, personnel were assigned, food was stocked, and units of sample storage were assembled, as was a steam launch. Further, a picnic was organised by the Linnean Society of New South Wales in the weeks preceding the expedition. Notable political figures and members of the academia of Sydney such as Premier John Robertson; Attorney General William Dalley, and Professor Charles Badham of the University of Sydney attended, as did the Consul of France, Eugène Simon, and Lieutenant Henri Villemot, Commandant of Cher. Badham presented a speech to the attendees, in which he praised France for its historical assistance in advancing the "civilisation of nations". Simon also presented a speech in which he commended Macleay for his scientific endeavour, correlating scientific discovery and knowledge to national progression. Additionally, he communicated his perception of the importance of the expedition in defining Australia's international scientific status.

=== Chevert ===
Francois de Chevert, who Chevert is named after, was an esteemed French general and soldier. The construction of Chevert commenced in April 1850 in Rochefort, France, and it was not until 26 November 1863 that Chevert began operating. Prior to the expedition, it had been a transport vessel used for colonial advancement under the rule of both the English and French within Pacific and Indian Ocean colonies. It began operating under French rule in Tahiti on 13 April 1864, transporting materials to colonies. In the capital of Tahiti and Polynesian colonies, the ship's service was of particular significance. Chevert eventually entered the merchant industry after being purchased by Captain Richard Martin on 19 March 1873. During its operation within the merchant industry, Chevert was impaired after being exposed to poor weather conditions. Prior to its entrance into Macleay's possession, the damages had been rectified.

== Scientific personnel ==
William John Macleay was the lead member of the Chevert expedition. His professions included: naturalist, entomologist, pastoralist, scientist and politician. Macleay was involved in founding the Entomological Society of New South Wales in 1862, and he was the first president of the Linnean Society of New South Wales, which was established in 1874. Following the expedition, in 1875, Macleay published "Notes on the Zoological Collections made in Torres Straits and New Guinea during the cruise of the Chevert", in which revealed scientific notes that he had taken on the expedition.

John William Brazier was a conchologist by profession; on the expedition his assigned role was zoological collecting.

William Frederick Petterd was a scientist and boot importer by profession; on the expedition his assigned role was zoological collecting.

William Hughes James was an American medical doctor and naturalist. On the expedition, James acted as a surgeon and a collector/taxidermist.

Thomas Reedy worked as a gardener; during the expedition his designated role was the collection of flora.

Edward Spalding worked as an entomologist and taxidermist; on the expedition he was a zoological collector.

== Journey ==
Chevert departed from Port Jackson on 18 May 1875. The expedition initially made stops at Cape York, the Palm Islands and Cape Grenville, Brookes Island and the north-west of the North Barnard Isles, and it was in the latter, that two samples of the Ptiloris species were collected. At Fitzroy Island and Palm Island, the terrain was dominated by boscage which, at Fitzroy Island, hindered specimen collection. Chevert then continued, reaching the coral encircled sand-bank, which was labelled the "Low Wooded Isle", which was then followed by Turtle Reef and Number 4 Howick Group. The topography near Flinders Island, which was the next location, was "rough and rocky". On 12 June 1875, Chevert reached Cape Grenville on the Cape York Peninsula, and due to poor weather conditions, specimen collection was not very successful. However, specimen collection did eventually ensue, with scientific personnel and native populations pursuing sample collecting at Cape Grenville and other locations within its vicinity. Cape Grenville and the surrounding terrain was arid, with the distribution and variants of vegetation on the lower and higher ranges exhibiting differences.

On 18 June 1875, the barque moored at Mud Bay, where it remained until 26 June 1875. During its anchorage, specimen collection abated temporarily. Following this period, Chevert headed north to Warrior Island, and then departed Somerset for New Guinea. On 3 July, Chevert moored one and half miles from the mouth of the Katow (Binaturi) River, where it remained for 14 days. Specimen collection was limited to the shore as the crew were unable to advance inland. When anchored near to the Katow River, the personnel were approached by two men, one of whom was from the village in which they resided, whose name was Maino, and the other, from a neighbouring village to the west, whose name was Owta. The men welcomed the personnel to their village, which contained seven houses that were positioned by the sea.

With Maino and Owta, the personnel navigated through a mangrove forest and eventually reached a forest described as "lofty and interminable". During their progression through the river, they encountered a blockage that was caused by a tree that had collapsed. To counteract this issue, the crew returned to Warrior Island, and then progressed to Darnley Island, where they were able to remove the material that was blocking their path. On 13 August, the crew departed for Hall Sound in New Guinea, and then proceeded to Yule Island. Yule Island comprised a range of plantations belonging to the Indigenous inhabitants, and the nature varied in appearance from that which was observed in New Guinea. For example, the topography varied, as Yule Island did not contain smooth surfaces, but rather, elevated formations, and additionally, the forests were not as impenetrable as those encountered prior. The personnel returned to Somerset on 8 September 1875, and Macleay journeyed back to Sydney on a separate ship, named Singapore.

== Scientific observations ==
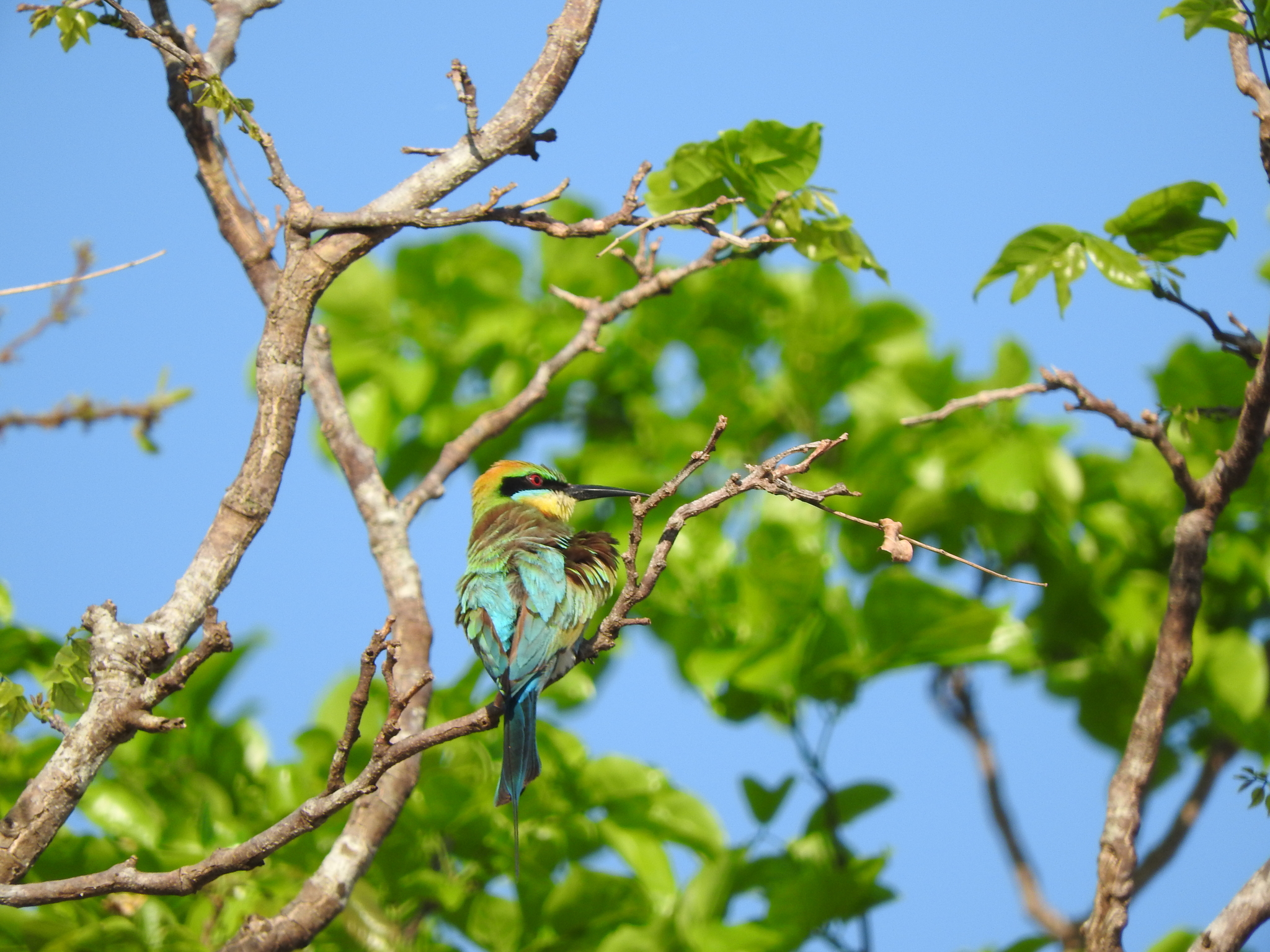
Rainbow bee-eater (Merops ornatus)

Following the expedition's dissolution, Macleay presented his zoological findings in a Linnean Society of New South Wales meeting. Further, in 1875, he published a paper in the journal, Proceedings of the Linnean Society of New South Wales titled "Notes on the Zoological Collections made in Torres Straits and New Guinea during the cruise of the Chevert". In this paper, Macleay discusses his observation that the majority of the mammals that he encountered in New Guinea, were marsupials. The outliers of this observation are listed as Sus Papuensis (New Guinea Pig), specific murdiae, and various species of frugivorous bats. Macleay comments that despite the deficit in his mammal collections, mammals were plentiful. He lists mammals that he witnessed, such as kangaroos, Cuscus, Belideus, Phalangers, and Parameles. Regarding avifauna, Macleay mentions the similarities between New Guinea and Australia. He mentions the bee-eater Merops ornatus and the Torres Strait pigeons, noting that both travel from New Guinea to Australia during the summer months.

Macleay also writes about his collection of three birds which had not been observed prior, named the Pilorhis Victoriae, which was collected by Mr. Masters at the North Barnard Isles. Regarding reptilia, Macleay observes that they were more abundant in New Guinea than in the Torres Strait. At Katow, collections were made consisting of snakes, lizards, tree frogs, and alligators. Macleay collected approximately 800 fish, which he sourced primarily from the northern Australian coast. While in the Torres Strait, Macleay observed that sharks and rays were the most heavily populated type of fish, and he was able to collect numerous samples of both organisms. Macleay notes that he encountered the colourful Labridae; and he observed Percoid fishes, including Pristopomatidae, and Squamipennes, which he detected in large quantities. Additionally, Macleay observed a fish belonging to the genus Naseus, and he also encountered the fish Echineis Remora, and a species of Mugil within the vicinity of Cape York. Regarding marine mollusca, Macleay comments that the collections were plentiful, and that they were made on the north-east coast of Australia and the Torres Straits. He states however, that the most successful specimen collection occurred at Darnley Island. Macleay notes that in New Guinea, he was able to include variants of new species of Helix within his collections.

== Aftermath ==
Following the termination of the expedition in 1875, medical doctor William James pursued a follow-up expedition, returning to New Guinea and the Torres Strait for further specimen collection. Members included William Petterd, Felix Knight, Lawrence Hargrave and Kendall Broadbent. The personnel, before specimen collection commenced, dispersed gradually and pursued specimen collection in different locations. On the Chevert expedition, specimen collection in New Guinea was limited to Katow, Yule Island and Hall Sound. However, in the follow-up expedition, specimen collection extended to Port Moresby, where specimen collection occurred from October 29, 1875, to January 26, 1876. Specimen collection then proceeded at Yule Island and Hall Sound until August 23, 1876. At Port Moresby, Petterd and Broadbent made the most progress in collecting. James and Knight pursued sample collecting at Port Moresby until November 4, 1875. They then proceeded to collect at Yule Island and Hall Sound until 23 August 1875. Referencing an anonymous source from 1875, terrestrial ecologist Graham R. Fulton states that the follow-up expedition was self-funded by the personnel, and that they travelled in a boat, named Ellangowan. On 23 August 1876, while in Hall Sound, James was speared, and as a result, died.

Following the end of the voyage of the Chevert, public reaction towards Macleay was generally negative. The public expected Macleay to achieve colonial advances in New Guinea and collect material goods, such as gold, despite the fact that Macleay had never proclaimed that he intended to do so. Rather, Macleay's intentions were grounded in the advancement of scientific knowledge. In January 1876, Macleay put Chevert up for sale, and it eventually operated under Captain Livingston, moving coal between Newcastle and Melbourne. In October 1876, it went on sale again. In June 1877, it reverted to its prior role of transporting coal around Newcastle, as well as areas such as Wallaroo in South Australia. After being on sale in March 1879, Chevert was sold to Captain Stephenson, and operated in the South Sea Island trade. Chevert became a site of wreckage in January 1880 following a cyclone. Chevert was last observed at Vanuatu, where its wreckage was utilised as a location to conduct meetings between chiefs.
