= Robert Strachan Wallace =

Sir Robert Strachan Wallace

Vice Chancellor of the University of Sydney
- In office 1928–1947
- Preceded by: Mungo William MacCallum
- Succeeded by: Stephen Henry Roberts

Personal details
- Born: 1 August 1882 Old Deer, Aberdeenshire, Scotland
- Died: 5 September 1961 (aged 79) Canberra, Australia
- Spouse: Mary Murray McAdam
- Education: University of Aberdeen; Christ Church, Oxford
- Profession: Academic and censor
- Website: University of Sydney

Sir Robert Strachan Wallace (1 August 1882 – 5 September 1961) was an Australian academic, army officer and film censor. Wallace served as the Vice-Chancellor of the University of Sydney from 1928 to 1947. He was Australia's chief censor from 1922 to 1927 and served as a member of the Australian Broadcasting Commission from 1932 to 1935.

== Early life ==
Wallace was born in Old Deer, Aberdeenshire, Scotland on 1 August 1882. The son of a blacksmith, he was educated at Robert Gordon's College, the University of Aberdeen, and Christ Church, Oxford where he took first-class honours in English literature.

== Academic and military career ==
After working as a Lecturer in English at the University of Aberdeen, Wallace was appointed as Professor of English Language and Literature at the University of Melbourne, Australia in 1912. While at Melbourne, Wallace also served as the administrator and dean of the faculty of arts from 1914 to 1917.

Wallace enlisted in the Australian Imperial Force in 1917. In 1918 he was posted to the A.I.F. Education Service in Cambridge, England and served as the director of the Australian Corps Central School at Rue, France.

After the war, Wallace continued at the University of Melbourne, where he held several senior board and academic positions, before being appointed Vice-Chancellor of the University of Sydney in 1927, a role he commenced in 1928. He continued as Vice-Chancellor until his retirement in 1947.

Wallace used his influence and government contacts to secure new funding for the university and, while having to deal with salary reductions, lack of essential equipment and financial constraints, established several new chairs, including the Bosch chairs in medicine, surgery and bacteriology, and expanded the university's course offerings. Wallace became known as "the building Vice-Chancellor". Upon taking up his post in 1928, Wallace found that the university's quadrangle was "overgrown, and the grounds beyond were in much worse repair." During his tenure, Wallace oversaw the renovation of university grounds, and the construction of a new medical school, biology laboratories, and the establishment of the departments of biochemistry and geography. A lecture theatre, bearing his name, was also constructed. Wallace worked to maintain the university's independence, despite the receipt of government grants. The university received a £100,000 donation from the Rockefeller Foundation for the construction of the medical school, and in 1932 Wallace traveled to the US to personally thank the Foundation for its support to education in Australia.

In 1939, Wallace was commissioned to undertake an operational review of the University of Western Australia, which encompassed "all phases of University activity...including organisation of the teaching departments, library development, adult education, public examinations, and future expansion of...activities."

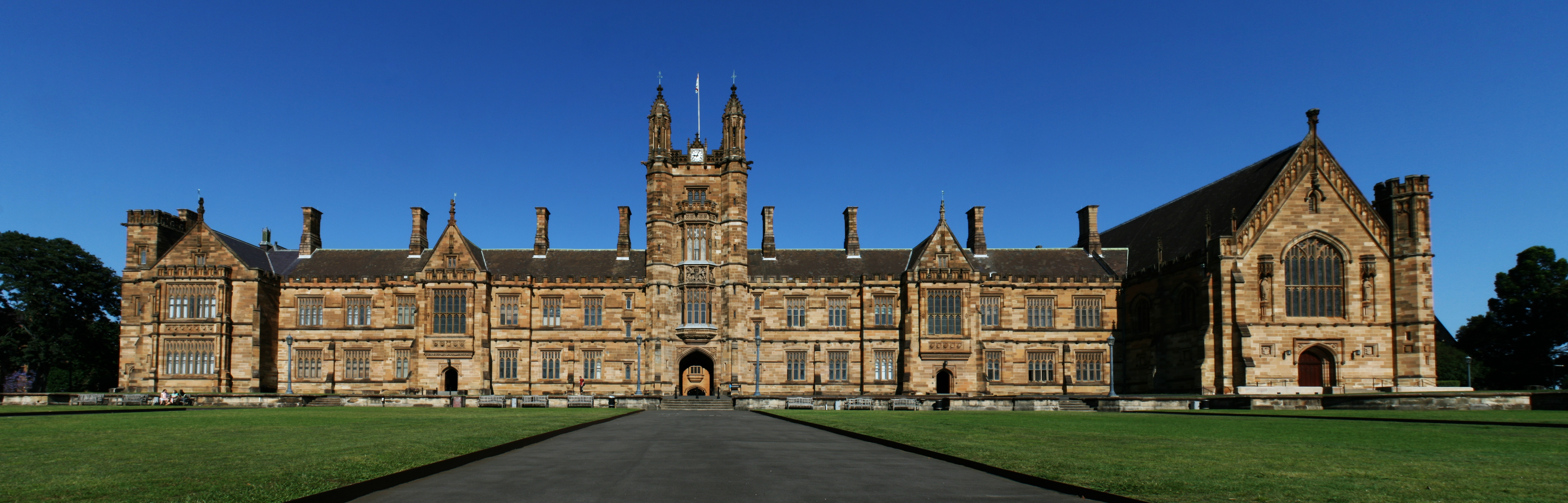
The University of Sydney's quadrangle was renovated under Wallace's Vice-Chancellorship

== Chief film censor ==
Wallace served as Australia's chief censor for cinematographic films from 1922 to 1927. In February 1927, while working as chief censor, Wallace made news when he tracked down and apprehended two armed men who had earlier broken into his home.

== Later life ==
Wallace was awarded a Knight Bachelor in the 1941 New Year Honours list. In 1947 he retired from the University of Sydney and moved to Canberra, where he died on 5 September 1961. He was buried in Canberra cemetery.
