= University of Sydney Quadrangle =

Prominent quadrangle in Sydney, Australia

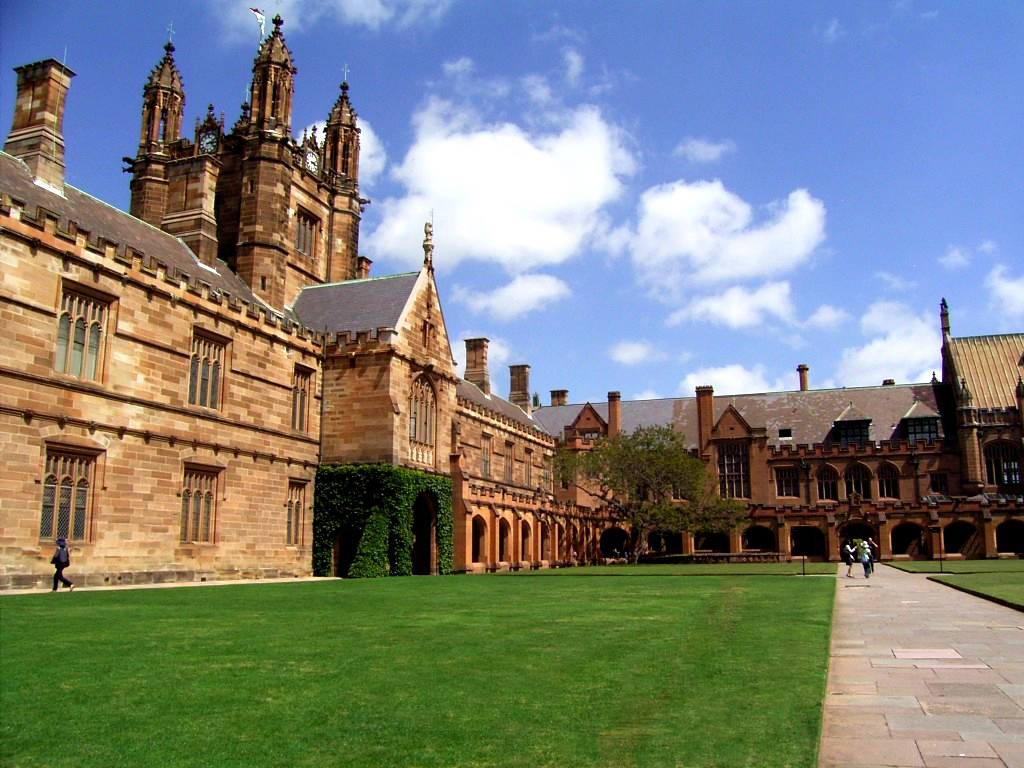
- The Quadrangle, pictured in 2005

- Location within Sydney
- Alternative names: University of Sydney Main Quadrangle

General information
- Status: Completed
- Architectural style: Victorian Academic Gothic Revival
- Location: The University of Sydney, Parramatta Road, Camperdown, Sydney, New South Wales, Australia
- Coordinates: 33°53′09″S 151°11′20″E
- Construction started: 1854
- Completed: 1966 (West Tower)

Technical details
- Material: Sydney sandstone

Design and construction
- Architects: Edmund Blacket (1855–1862); James Barnet; Walter Liberty Vernon (1902–1904); Leslie Wilkinson

New South Wales Heritage Database (Local Government Register)
- Official name: Main Building and Quadrangle Group, University of Sydney Including Interiors
- Type: Local government heritage (built)
- Criteria: a., c., d., e., f.
- Designated: 14 December 2012
- Reference no.: I84
- Type: Education
- Category: University

The University of Sydney Quadrangle is a prominent quadrangle formed through the construction of several Sydney sandstone buildings located within The University of Sydney Camperdown Campus, adjacent to Parramatta Road, in Sydney, New South Wales, Australia. The Quadrangle is also called The University of Sydney Main Quadrangle. The Quadrangle and its associated main building and interior was listed on the City of Sydney local government heritage list on 14 December 2012.

Built between 1854 and 1966 in the Victorian Academic Gothic Revival architectural style, the Quadrangle was designed and developed by numerous contributors including Edmund Blacket, James Barnet, and Leslie Wilkinson. The original building included the Great Hall and was constructed between 1855 and 1862. Construction on the quadrangle began in 1854, it had four sides by 1926, and was completed in 1966 after several stages of development. The Quadrangle comprises the Great Hall, MacLaurin Hall, Faculty of Arts office and the Nicholson Museum. MacLaurin Hall was constructed from 1902 to 1904 and was designed by Walter Liberty Vernon. The building is mostly constructed of Sydney sandstone and is unique in the Australian architectural landscape. At the time of its completion, the Quadrangle was 'the largest public building in the colony.' The main entrance – constructed first along with the Great Hall – is underneath the clock tower, which holds one of only three carillons in Australia.

Robert Strachan Wallace, the university's vice chancellor from 1928 to 1947, upon taking up his position found the quadrangle to be "overgrown, and the grounds beyond...in much worse repair". He embarked on a restoration program, for which he became known as the "building vice chancellor".

== Architecture ==
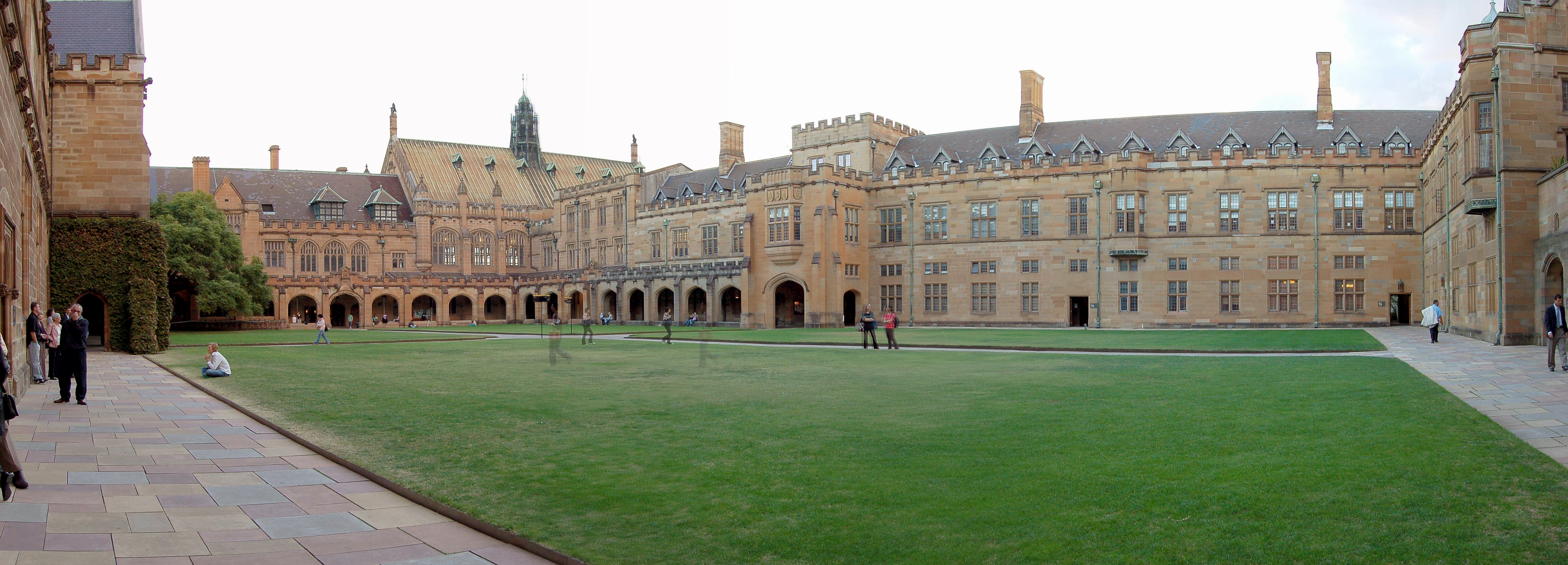
The Quadrangle, the University of Sydney

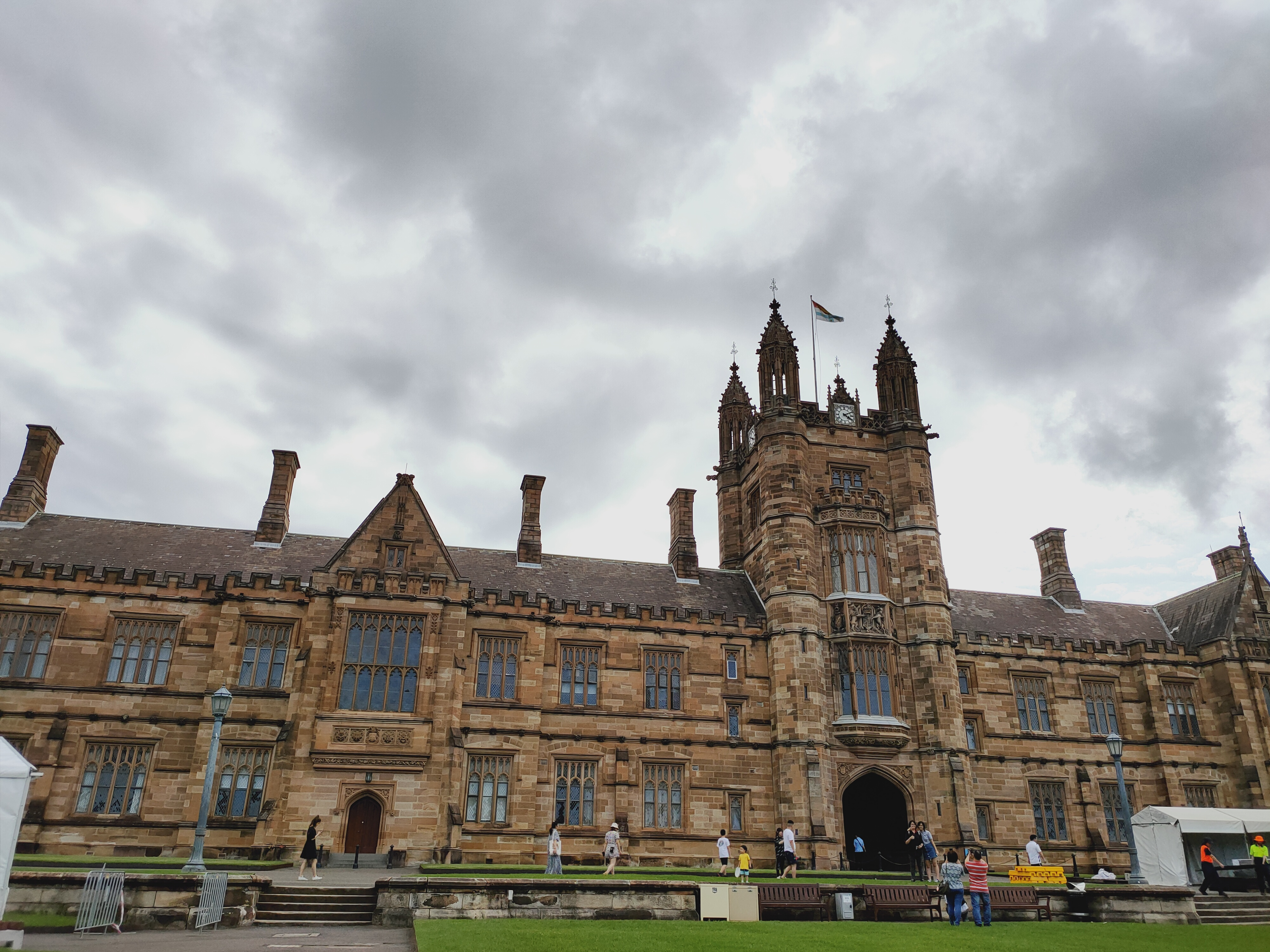
The Quadrangle in the University of Sydney

The Quadrangle design is based on those of Oxford and Cambridge. It contains one of only three carillons in Australia, the others being located on Queen Elizabeth II Island, Canberra and in Bathurst.

The Quadrangle is categorised under Sandstone Universities which are informally known as Australia's oldest universities. Commonly known as the first building for Australia's first university, the Quadrangle itself is built in an anachronistic style, which was already outdated by the time it was built. The Female Orphan School, built in 1813, is the oldest building at an Australian University. Edmund Blacket, one of the architects responsible for the design of the Quadrangle, was also known for other works in Sydney such as St Andrew's Cathedral. Blacket primarily focused on Victorian Gothic Revival architecture, which influenced James Barnet's design of Sydney University's Andersen Stuart Building. In 1924, the Quadrangle comprised four walls, in which are included bronze pipes which state the year they were placed. The final completion of the Quadrangle's exterior display was during the 1960s, which included work on the West Tower.

There are a variety of gargoyles located across the walls of the Quadrangle and its towers. Some serve the functional purpose of waterspouts and draining water from buildings, but many are simply decorative gargoyles, also known as 'grotesque'. The abundance of a variety of gargoyles featured in the Quadrangle's architecture relates to gargoyles being characteristic of Neo-Gothic medieval architecture, as they have a symbolic role of warding off evil spirits in the Catholic tradition. Traditionally, gargoyles often depicted fantastical and mythical creatures, but in the turn of the 12th century stonemasons started incorporating real animals; both kinds of creatures can be found on the Quadrangle. Such medieval influenced architecture, although partially appropriated to a local context, directly mimic designs of esteemed Cambridge and Oxford universities in England.

In the 1850s, under the direction of Blacket, three stonemasons worked on the clock tower gargoyles: Joseph Popplewell, Edwin Colley, and Barnet. The infusion of Australian flora and fauna with traditional medieval Neo-Gothic influences is evident in some of the Quadrangle's distinctive gargoyles. There is a kangaroo gargoyle on the clocktower (right hand side, facing towards the city) and a crocodile gargoyle on the inside of the clock tower, that are different from the traditional gargoyles on the Quadrangle. In addition, there are kookaburras above the entrance to the northern foyer.

Adjacent to the Quadrangle is the university's Great Hall, which holds an organ designed by Rudolf von Beckerath of Hamburg.

== The Jacaranda tree ==
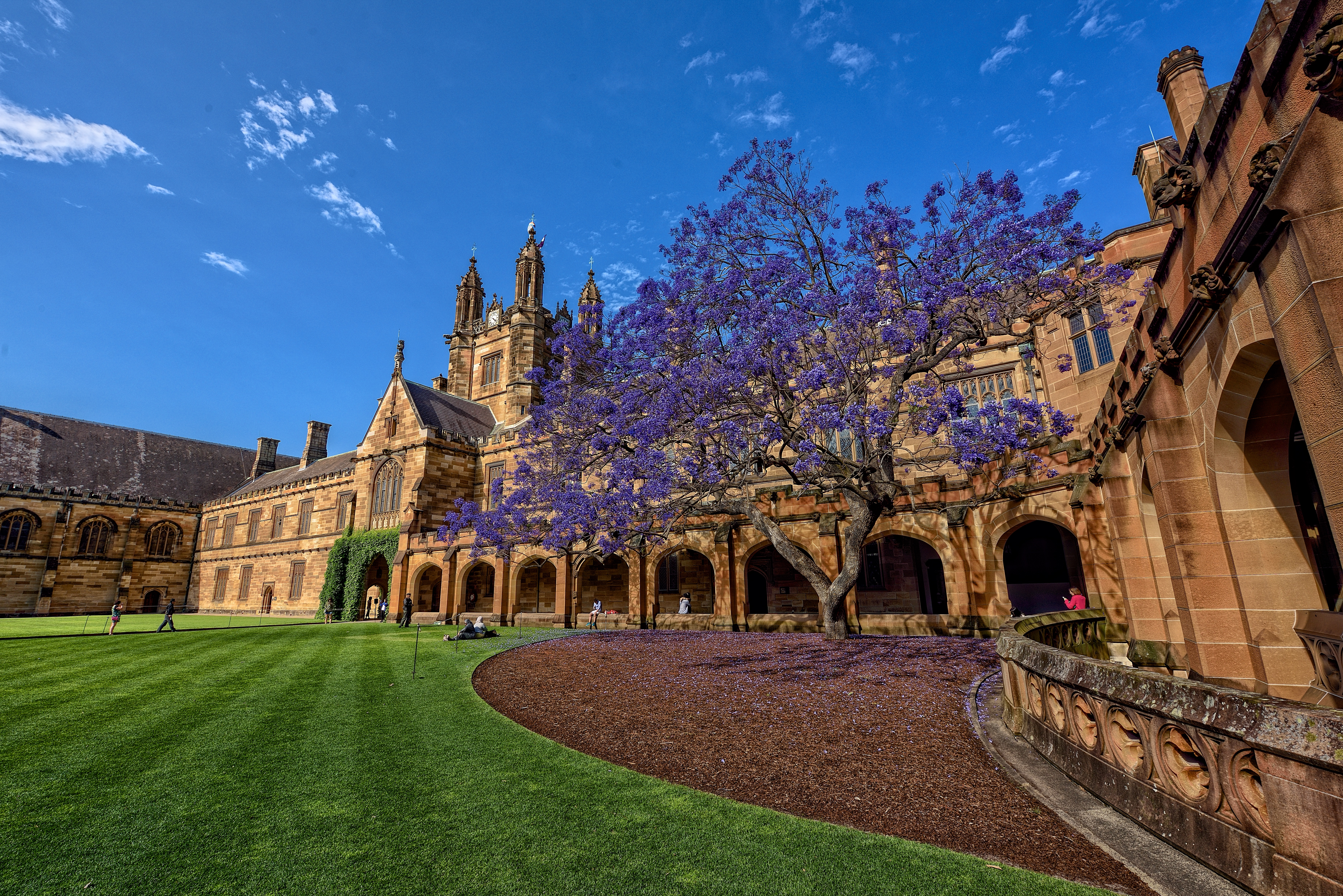
The Jacaranda tree in the quadrangle in full bloom. Philosophy classes were held in the rooms behind it.

A jacaranda tree was planted in the Quadrangle in 1928 by Professor E. G. Waterhouse, who was also a keen horticulturist and dedicated contributor to the landscape design of the university. The tree was a well-loved specimen that served as the background to many graduations and private events before its death in 2016. Its flowering at examination time was believed to be a clear sign that students should start studying. A replacement tree, and an Illawarra flame tree, were planted in July 2017.

== The Philosophy Room ==
The Philosophy Room located within the quadrangle is home to two murals which are placed at the back of the room. On 14 November 1921, these two mural decorations were unveiled in the Philosophy Room within the quadrangle at the University of Sydney. They were painted by Norman Carter and were commissioned to celebrate the 30 years of work of Professor Francis Anderson. One mural depicts Socrates, Aristotle and Plato together whilst the other depicts Descartes, Bacon and Spinoza. Both murals were unveiled by Professor Anderson's wife.

== Maintenance and groundskeeping ==
The University of Sydney established a Conservation of Grounds Plan in October 2002. Being the most photographed area in the university, and having a one-hour heritage tour, the Quadrangle must keep up its appearances. Of the many, three policies are stated in order to maintain and conserve the vegetation and foliage of the university's grounds including the Quadrangle.

These three are:

- Policy Seven: When significant trees such as the jacaranda tree in the Quadrangle age significantly or decease, they should be replaced with an identical tree.
- Policy Eight: Trees and vegetation that are highly important to the image of the heritage buildings such as the infamous purple tree in the Quadrangle and the manicured green grass must be preserved. This is evident in how ropes and bollards are put up in order to prevent students and tourists from soiling the newly planted grass.
- Policy Nine: Pruning of vegetation such as the Ivy on the archway should be well kept in order to sustain views and accessibility.

== See also ==
- Australian non-residential architectural styles
- New South Wales Heritage Database
