= John Brazier =

Mollusc researcher (1842–1930)

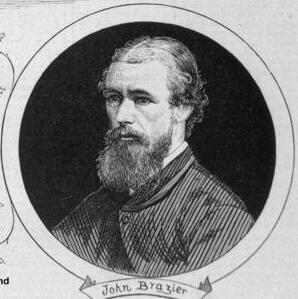
- Born: 23 September 1842
- Died: 20 August 1930 (aged 87)
- Known for: shell collections
- Scientific career
- Fields: malacology conchology
- Institutions: Australian Museum

John William Brazier (23 September 1842 – 20 August 1930) was a malacologist from Australia.

== Early life ==
He was born to Captain John Brazier and his wife Mary nee McMillan. His father commanded whaling vessels out of Sydney, Australia, and during his voyages he collected sea shells as a hobby. His son, John, accompanied him to sea on at least one of those voyages and he too became interested in collecting sea shells.

== Professional life ==
In 1865 John Brazier junior accompanied Julius Brenchley on the voyage of H.M.S. Curacoa to Norfolk Island, Samoa, Tonga, Fiji, the New Hebrides, the Solomon Islands and New Caledonia. After several other shell collecting expeditions in Australasia he joined William John Macleay 's 1875 expedition in the Chevert to New Guinea via the Great Barrier Reef. In the early 1880s Brazier curated the shell collections at the Australian Museum and at first also the ethnological, historical and numismatic collections. By 1891 the shell collections had grown so large that Brazier curated only marine shells.

== Personal life ==
He married first Sophia Sarah Jane, after whom he named several species of shells. She had three daughters before dying in 1882. He next married Eliza Emma Heinze, with whom he had eight children.

== Works ==
- Brazier, J. (1870). Descriptions of three new species of marine shells from the Australian coast. Proceedings of the Zoological Society of London 1870:108-110.
- Brazier, J. (1875). Descriptions of ten new species of shells from the collection of Mr. Charles Coxen, of Brisbane, Queensland. Proceedings of the Zoological Society of London 1875:31-34, pl. 4.
- Brazier, J. (1875). [... describing fourteen new species of terrestrial, fluviatile, and marine shells from Australia and the Solomon Islands...]. Proceedings of the Linnean Society of New South Wales 1:1-9.
- Brazier, J. (1876). A list of the Pleurotomidae collected during the Chevert Expedition, with the description of the new species. Proceedings of the Linnean Society of New South Wales, 1, 151–162.
- Brazier J. (1877). Description of three new species of shells, from Australia and New Guinea.Proceedings of the Linnean Society of New South Wales 2: 25-27 [26]
- Brazier J. (1877). Mollusca collected during the Chevert Expedition. Proceedings of the Linnean Society of New South Wales 2: 55-60.
- Brazier, J. (1877) Shells collected during the Chevert Expedition. Proceedings of the Linnean Society of New South Wales, 1, 224–240.
- Brazier, J. (1877). Continuation of the Mollusca of the Chevert Expedition, with new species. Proceedings of the Linnean Society of New South Wales. 1: 283-301.
- Brazier, J. (1877). Continuation of the Mollusca of the Chevert Expedition. [Family Littorinidae – Family Planaxidae – Family Rissoidae]. Proceedings of the Linnean Society of New South Wales 1: 362-368
- Brazier, J. (1878) Continuation of the Mollusca of the Chevert Expedition. Proceedings of the Linnean Society of New South Wales, 2, 368–369.
- Brazier, J. (1883) Synonymy of Australian and Polynesian Land and Marine Mollusca. Proceedings of the Linnean Society of New South Wales. Vol. 8, pp. 224–234
- Brazier, J. (1886). Notes on the distribution of Ceratella fusca, Gray. Proceedings of the Linnean Society of New South Wales 21 : 575-577.
- Brazier, J. 1887. Trochidae and other genera of South Australia with their synonyms. Transactions and Proceedings and Report of the Royal Society of South Australia 9: 116-125.
- Brazier, J. (1889) Notes and critical remarks on a donation of shells sent to the museum of the Conchological Society of Great Britain and Ireland. Journal of Conchology, 6, 66–84.
- Brazier, J. (1891). Description of a new cone from Mauritius. Proceedings of the Linnean Society of New South Wales, series 2, 6:276, pl. 19.
- Brazier, J. (1894). [...a magnificent new cone, Conus pulcherrimus...]. Proceedings of the Linnean Society of New South Wales, series 2, 9:187.
- Brazier, J. (1896) A new genus and three new species of Mollusca from New South Wales, New Hebrides, and Western Australia. Proceedings of the Linnean Society of New South Wales, 21, 345–347.
- Brazier, J. (1896) New species of cone from the Solomon Islands. Proceedings of the Linnean Society of New South Wales, series 2, 10:471.
- Brazier, J. (1898). Four new species of Mollusca from Victoria. Proceedings of the Linnean Society of New South Wales 23:271-272.
- Brazier, J. (1898). New marine shells from the Solomon Islands and Australia. Proceedings of the Linnean Society of New South Wales 22:779-782.
