= University of Sydney Faculty of Medicine and Health =

Faculty of Medicine and Health
- Type: Public
- Established: 2018
- Affiliations: University of Sydney
- Dean: Professor John Prins
- Location: Sydney, New South Wales, Australia; 33.888599°S 151.177602°E
- Campus: Urban
- Website: sydney.edu.au/medicine-health

The Faculty of Medicine and Health is a constituent body of the University of Sydney in New South Wales, Australia. It was launched on 30 April 2018.

== History ==
As part of the University's Strategic Plan 2016-2020, an international panel was convened and recommended that the establishment of a single, integrated Faculty of Medicine and Health be established to ensure the university was well-positioned to address challenges of healthcare in the 21st century. The University Senate approved the establishment of the new faculty in 2016.

In 2017, Professor Alan Pettigrew was appointed as the Transition Manager for the Faculty of Medicine and Health. In October of the same year it was announced that Professor Robyn Ward AM would join the University as the Executive Dean of the Faculty of Medicine and Health from July 2018. Professor Pettigrew was appointed Acting Executive Dean from January to July 2018.

== Schools ==
The faculty is made up of seven schools, seven clinical schools, and three rural clinical schools.

=== Schools ===
- The University of Sydney School of Dentistry
- The University of Sydney School of Medicine
- The University of Sydney School of Health Sciences
- The University of Sydney School of Medical Sciences
- The University of Sydney Susan Wakil School of Nursing and Midwifery
- The University of Sydney School of Pharmacy
- The University of Sydney School of Public Health

=== Clinical schools ===
- The University of Sydney Central Clinical School
- The University of Sydney Children's Hospital Westmead Clinical School
- The University of Sydney Concord Clinical School
- The University of Sydney General Practice Clinical School
- The University of Sydney Nepean Clinical School
- The University of Sydney Northern Clinical School
- The University of Sydney Westmead Clinical School

=== Rural Clinical Schools ===
- The Broken Hill University Department of Rural Health
- School of Rural Health (Dubbo/Orange)
- The University Centre for Rural Health

== Centres and institutes ==
There are also a number of research institutes and centres attached to the faculty.

=== Flagship centres ===
- Centre for Child and Adolescent Health Research
- The Daffodil Centre
- The Matilda Centre for Research in Mental Health and Substance Use
- Poche Centre for Indigenous Health
- Save Sight Institute
- NHMRC Clinical Trials Centre
- Sydney Infectious Diseases Institute
- Sydney Musculoskeletal Health Centre

=== Impact centres ===
- Centre for Disability Research and Policy
- Heat and Health Research Centre
- Leeder Centre for Health Policy, Economics and Data
- Reproduction and Perinatal Centre
- Westmead Applied Research Centre
