= Sydney Dental School =

School in Sydney, Australia

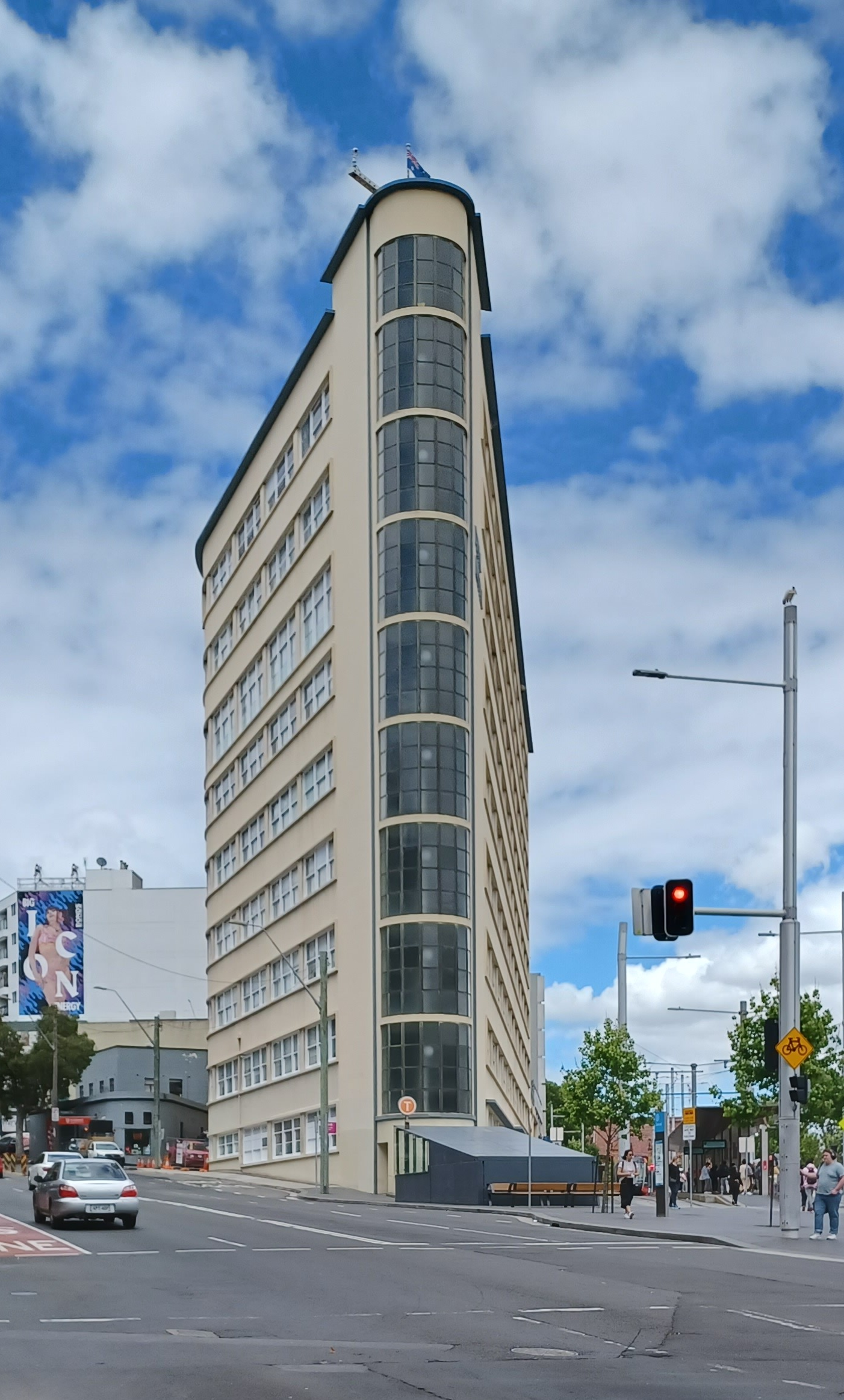
- Sydney Dental Hospital
- Type: Public
- Established: 1901
- Affiliations: University of Sydney
- Acting Head of School and Dean: Professor Heiko Spallek
- Location: Surry Hills / Camperdown / Darlington, New South Wales, Australia; 33.884556°S 151.207755°E
- Website: sydney.edu.au/dentistry/

The University of Sydney School of Dentistry also known as Sydney Dental School is Australia's first dental school and a constituent body of the University of Sydney, Australia.

Previously the Faculty of Dentistry, the Sydney Dental School joined the newly formed Faculty of Medicine and Health on 30 April 2018. The new faculty was established to ensure the university was best positioned to address the challenges of healthcare in the 21st century.

The Sydney Dental School is based at the Westmead Centre for Oral Health (part of Westmead Hospital), and Sydney Dental Hospital (situated between Chalmers and Elizabeth streets opposite the entrance to Central station). The Sydney Dental Hospital was the original site of the Sydney Dental School when it was first opened in March 1901. The school also has connections with other local health district dental hospitals, and provides opportunities for students to undertake rural and regional placements.

Professor Heiko Spallek has been Head of School and Dean of the Sydney Dental School since November 2018.

== Research ==
Dentistry at the University of Sydney is committed to the discovery of new principles and new ideas. The school has an emphasis on 'putting the mouth back into health', that is, viewing oral health as a critical component of overall health. The school's main research areas are population oral health, chronic diseases and ageing well/ageing productively.

Their multidisciplinary research approach brings together the complementary expertise of the University of Sydney's faculties, centres and institutes with that of our affiliated teaching hospitals, institutes and international research partnerships. Their researchers use dental expertise to enhance studies in fundamental cell biology, microbiology, molecular biology and biomechanics.

== Study dentistry ==
The Sydney Dental School offers two pathways to becoming a dentist:

- Doctor of Dental Medicine – graduate entry
- Double Degree Dentistry (Bachelor of Science (Advanced)/Doctor of Dental Medicine) – for high school leavers with outstanding results.

== Undergraduate degree ==
- Bachelor of Oral Health

== Postgraduate coursework ==
- Doctor of Dental Medicine (DMD)

Specialist degrees For qualified and eligible dentists, the Sydney Dental School offers the following postgraduate coursework degrees:

- Doctor of Clinical Dentistry (Oral Medicine)
- Doctor of Clinical Dentistry (Oral Surgery)
- Doctor of Clinical Dentistry (Orthodontics)
- Doctor of Clinical Dentistry (Paediatric Dentistry)
- Doctor of Clinical Dentistry (Periodontics)
- Doctor of Clinical Dentistry (Prosthodontics)
- Doctor of Clinical Dentistry (Special Needs Dentistry)
- Doctor of Clinical Dentistry (Endodontics)
- Graduate Diploma in Clinical Dentistry (Advanced Restorative)
- Graduate Certificate in Clinical Dentistry (Advanced Restorative)
- Graduate Diploma in Clinical Dentistry (Surgical Dentistry)
- Graduate Diploma in Dentistry (Oral Implants)
- Graduate Diploma in Dentistry (Conscious Sedation and Pain Control)
- Master of Dental Public Health

== Postgraduate research ==
- Doctor of Philosophy (PhD)
- Master of Philosophy

== Notable alumni ==
- Robert Kavanaugh, dentist and George Cross recipient, BDS '50
