= Sydney College =

Sydney College can refer to more than one establishment:

- Sydney College, Bath, a former prominent independent boys school in Somerset, England, now housing the Holburne Museum of Art
- Sydney Grammar School, a grammar school in Sydney, New South Wales
- Sydney College of the Arts
- Sydney College of Divinity
- Sydney College of Advanced Education
