= University of Sydney Faculty of Arts and Social Sciences =

University of Sydney Faculty

Faculty of Arts and Social Sciences
- Type: Public
- Affiliations: University of Sydney
- Dean: Prof. Lisa Adkins
- Location: Camperdown / Darlington, New South Wales, Australia
- Website: sydney.edu.au/arts

The Faculty of Arts and Social Sciences is the largest of the six faculties that constitute the University of Sydney. The Faculty of Arts and Social Sciences comprises six Schools and approximately 40 departments and programs, and a diverse curriculum at undergraduate and postgraduate levels.

== History ==
In 2011, the Faculty was renamed from the Faculty of Arts to the Faculty of Arts and Social Sciences, following the inclusions of the Discipline of Economics (from the Faculty of Economics and Business, which was renamed as the University of Sydney Business School), the Centre for International Security Studies (CISS), and the Graduate School of Government (GSG).

== Organisation ==
The Faculty is divided into six schools which are collectively home to over 40 departments. The schools are:

- School of Literature, Art and Media
- School of Languages and Cultures
- School of Philosophical and Historical Inquiry
- School of Social and Political Sciences
- School of Economics
- Sydney School of Education and Social Work
