= Sydney Teachers' College =

Tertiary education institution that trained school teachers in Sydney, Australia

Cigarette card featuring the Sydney Teachers' College's crest and colours, circa 1920s

The Sydney Teachers' College was a tertiary education institution that trained school teachers in Sydney, Australia. It existed from 1906 until the end of 1981, when it became the Sydney Institute of Education, a part of the new Sydney College of Advanced Education (Sydney CAE). On 1 January 1990 Sydney Institute of Education was amalgamated with the University of Sydney, eventually becoming a part of the Faculty of Education at the University of Sydney.

== History ==
The college was established in 1906 (119 years ago) at the urging of newly appointed director of public instruction Peter Board, with Alexander Mackie appointed principal in November of the same year. Mackie firmly believed that the college could aspire to a partnership with the University of Sydney.

Prior to that there was a pupil-teacher system in New South Wales, followed by two training colleges, Hurlstone Residential College for women and Fort Street High School for men. Public dissatisfaction with the pupil-teacher system led to the establishment of a non-residential, co-educational training college in part of Blackfriars Primary School on Parramatta Road (now Broadway). In 1905 men moved from Fort Street to Blackfriars, and in 1906 women moved from Hurlstone College to Blackfriars.

In the first year there were 189 students (of these, 178 were serving teachers). Mackie was appointed Lecturer in Education at the University (while continuing as Principal of the Teachers' College) in 1909. In 1910 he also became Professor of Education and Principal of the Teachers' College (positions held also by his successor, Christopher R. McRae). In the same year the University Senate approved a Diploma in Education, taught jointly by the university and the teachers' college.

An Act was passed in 1912 for construction of a new teachers' college in the grounds of the University of Sydney. However, the First World War delayed construction, and the foundation stone was not laid until 1917. Welsh emigrant May Marsden was employed for the Sydney Teachers' College by Mackie as an art lecturer. She was an inspiring teacher believing that artists need to be left alone. She filled the corridors of Sydney Teachers' College with copies of art by the great masters and prints of contemporary work including work by Eleonore Lange. She would persuade her students to gather around a piece of art in the corridor where she would inform and entertain her students, One of her earliest students was Portia Mary Bennett.

The building was officially opened in 1925 (but students moved to the partially completed building in 1920).

By 1933 course offerings had become fixed: (a) 2-year ordinary course: to prepare teachers for primary and kindergarten work, science teaching in junior technical and domestic science schools, manual training, commercial work, agricultural and general instruction; (b) 4-year course and graduation from the university or a 3-year course (2 years at the university and 1 at college) for high school specialist teachers; (c) 5th year of study for some students (mostly honours students in science).

A short course was devised in 1938 to prepare tradesmen to teach trades within the Technical Education Branch of the Department of Public Instruction in this eventually expanded into a division within the college and later into an Institute of Sydney CAE.

The 1940s also saw an expansion of in-service training and post-college refresher courses for practising teachers; special courses offered for officers of the Child Welfare Department, the Health Department and the Housing Commission; courses developed in broadcasting, visual education, counselling, librarianship and religious education. This obviously led to a dramatic increase in the size of the college. A temporary Annex established in the Enmore Public School as the total number of students in 1951 was 2339. But in 1954 the Enmore Annex closed and its functions were transferred to North Newtown Intermediate High School in Carillon Avenue. An additional campus was established for Technical Teacher Education in the GAZAL Building, Bulwarra Road, Ultimo and a further campus for Primary Teacher Education at Salisbury Road, Newtown.

The 1970s saw the college go through many changes. In September 1971 Sydney Teachers' College became a College of Advanced Education within the Department of Education. The Higher Education Act (1969) was replaced by the Colleges of Advanced Education Act (1975) which determined the operations of the Teachers' College from that date. Bachelor of Education course was established in 1975 for students intending to become Industrial Arts of Home Economics teachers. A few years later the Bachelor of Education course extended to include the Humanities, Sciences and Mathematics.

The Teachers' College continued to offer: (a) Diploma of Teaching; (b) Graduate Diploma in Education; (c) Graduate Diploma in Educational Studies; (d) Graduate Diploma in Adult Education; (e) Diploma Conversion courses in Technical Teacher Education. College staff worked with staff from Royal Prince Alfred Hospital (RPAH) to develop basic nursing and post basic nursing education programs, and participated in RPAH’s existing basing nursing training program.

By 1981, the college had established centres in specialist fields. By that year, they included: (a) Research Centre; (b) Sydney Human Performance Laboratory; (c) Audio Visual Centre; (d) Sydney Educational Museum Centre; (e) Curriculum Centre; (f) Multicultural Education Project.

On 31 December 1981 (43 years ago), the college ceased to exist. It was succeeded by the Sydney Institute of Education which was part of Sydney College of Advanced Education and, in 1990, the Sydney Institute of Education became part of the University of Sydney.

== See also ==
- University of Sydney
- Sydney College of Advanced Education
- Sydney Faculty of Education and Social Work
