= Sydney Nursing School =

Nursing school in Sydney, Australia

- Type: Public
- Established: 1991
- Affiliations: University of Sydney
- Head of School and Dean: Professor Donna Waters
- Location: Sydney, New South Wales, Australia; 33.888599°S 151.177602°E
- Campus: Urban
- Website: sydney.edu.au/nursing

The University of Sydney Susan Wakil School of Nursing and Midwifery, also known as Sydney Nursing School, is the nursing school of the University of Sydney in Australia. It was founded in 1991 initially as The University of Sydney Faculty of Nursing. On 30 April 2018 it joined the newly combined Faculty of Medicine and Health.

Sydney Nursing School has been ranked number two in Australia and 15th in the world in the 2018 QS Subject rankings.

== Coursework programs ==
=== Undergraduate ===
Sydney Nursing School offer three entry-to-practice pathways to becoming a registered nurse in Australia:

- Bachelor of Nursing (Advanced Studies)
- Combined bachelor's degree–Master of Nursing with:
1. Bachelor of Arts
2. Bachelor of Health Science
3. Bachelor of Science
- Master of Nursing (Graduate Entry)

=== Postgraduate ===
Master’s, Graduate Diploma and Graduate Certificate level options are available in the following areas of clinical practice:

- Advanced Nursing Practice
- Cancer and Haematology Nursing
- Clinical Trials Practice (Graduate Certificate only)
- Emergency Nursing
- Intensive Care Nursing
- Mental Health Nursing
- Nurse Practitioner
- Primary Health Care Nursing

== Research activity ==
The School has six core research themes:

- Midwifery and Women's Health
- Cancer and Palliative Care
- Chronic Disease and Ageing
- Acute, Critical and Trauma Care
- Mental Health
- Health Care Practice
