= Blackfriars Primary School =

Australian state school established in 1884

Blackfriars Primary School was an Australian state school established in 1884 in what is now the Sydney suburb of Chippendale. It became a Teachers' College in the early years of the 20th century and 90 years later became the University of Technology, Sydney.

== History ==
Blackfriars Primary School
1 Blackfriars School (approx. location)

Blackfriars Estate was part of land once owned by Solomon Levey, who died 1833. John Tooth built his Kent Brewery nearby.

The estate was subdivided for sale to the public in 1878.

When sales of Blackfriars estate faltered in 1881 the government stepped in and purchased a major portion for a public school, criticised at the time for its ambitious size, being designed for 1,500 children.

Much of the school was turned over to Sydney Teachers' College around 1905, then became University of Technology, Sydney, in 1996.
