= University of Sydney School of Education and Social Work =

Sydney School of Education and Social Work
- Type: Public
- Established: 2003
- Affiliations: University of Sydney
- Location: Camperdown / Darlington, New South Wales, Australia
- Website: sydney.edu.au/education

The Sydney School of Education and Social Work is a constituent body of the University of Sydney, Australia. In January 2003, the faculty was formed by the amalgamation of two schools from the former Faculty of Education with the School of Social Work and Policy Studies from the Faculty of Arts.

== See also ==
- Sydney University Education and Social Work Society
- Sydney Teachers College
