= Sydney College of Advanced Education =

Former educational institution in Sydney, Australia

The Sydney College of Advanced Education was a tertiary education institution in Sydney, New South Wales, Australia. It existed from 1982 to 1989.

== Foundation ==
The Sydney College of Advanced Education commenced operation on 1 January 1982 as part of a round of government-forced amalgamations of Colleges of Advanced Education, amalgamating five previous institutions: Alexander Mackie College of Advanced Education, the Guild Teachers' College, the Nursery School Teachers' College, Sydney Kindergarten Teachers' College and Sydney Teachers' College. It was divided into five institutes at its inception: the Sydney Institute of Education (based at the former Sydney Teachers' College campuses at Camperdown and Newtown), the Institute of Early Childhood Studies (with campuses at Newtown and Waverley), the St George Institute of Education (incorporating the former Alexander Mackie College campus at Oatley), the City Art Institute (with campuses in The Rocks, Paddington and Surry Hills), and the Institute of Technical and Adult Teacher Education (based at Ultimo). It also had an additional centre for students who wished to teach in non-government schools, The Guild Centre.

The college offered undergraduate and postgraduate degrees and diploma courses in visual arts and various specialties of education. A college council was formed with prominent engineer Harold White as chairperson and Margaret Whitlam as deputy chairperson, with Whitlam succeeding White as chairperson in 1982. It also had a student representative council, the Sydney College of Advanced Education SRC. The college began with an estimated student population of over 4,300 students, which rose to 6,000 by late 1982. The amalgamated college faced immediate issues: the state government had promised that all staff from the five predecessor institutions would be retained at the new college, while the federal government had expected instant savings to be made, resulting in an instant budget shortfall of an estimated $500,000.

== Mid-1980s and City Art Institute separation ==
The college faced ongoing problems incorporating predecessor institutions with differing approaches, philosophies and aims into a coherent overarching organisation. Institutes tended to keep their own identity and resist many top-down initiatives, and attempts to build an overarching college ethos were of limited success. A sixth institute, the Institute of Nursing Studies, based at Camperdown, was formed in late 1984. In February 1985, the Adult Teacher Education branch moved into the redeveloped former Market No. 3 building in Haymarket, mainly tenanted by the NSW Institute of Technology. The college remained spread across thirteen campuses in 1986. The Sydney CAE had been faced with the prospect of education campus closures as early as a 1983 review, and after a proposal to sell both the Institute of Early Childhood Education's campuses and move it to Oatley met with strong opposition, its Burren Street, Newtown campus was closed and sold to the University of Sydney in 1987 and its operations consolidated at its Waverley campus. Funding continued to drop throughout the college's lifespan, with Commonwealth funding to Sydney CAE per full-time student dropping 33% between its foundation and 1987.

The City Art Institute had concentrated at its Paddington campus by 1984. Its introduction of a master's degree in art and design in 1982 had been the first of its kind in Australia. The City Art Institute ceased to be part of the Sydney in 1987 when state Education Minister Rodney Cavalier amalgamated it with other institutions to form the NSW Institute of the Arts. It was reported that the CAI had been unhappy with the broader Sydney CAE for some time, and a 1986 review had made an ill-fated merger proposal with the Sydney College of the Arts.

== Disestablishment ==
In the late 1980s, the Dawkins Revolution moved to convert all Colleges of Advanced Education into universities, which brought another round of forced amalgamations. The Sydney CAE was seen as not large enough to become a university in its own right, and in November 1988 the college council reluctantly agreed to disestablish itself and divest the various institutes. It ceased to exist on 31 December 1989, with the five remaining institutes passing to other universities: the Sydney Institute of Education and Institute of Nursing Studies became part of the University of Sydney, the Institute of Early Childhood Studies became part of Macquarie University, the St George Institute of Education became part of the University of New South Wales, and the Institute of Technical and Adult Teacher Education became part of the University of Technology Sydney.
