= Sydney Pharmacy School =

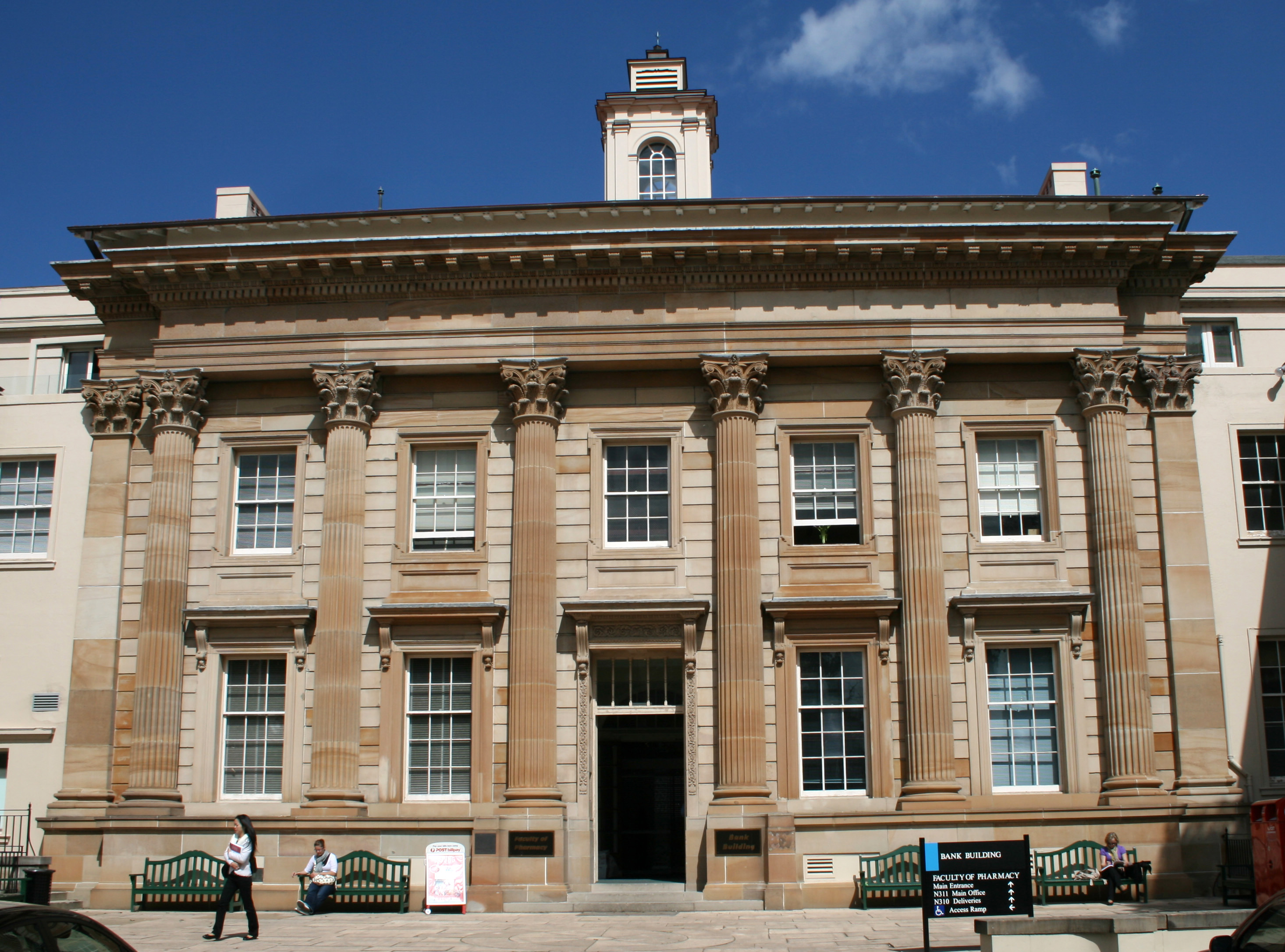
- Sydney Pharmacy School building
- Type: Public
- Established: 1899
- Affiliations: University of Sydney
- Head of School and Dean: Professor Andrew McLachlan AM
- Location: Camperdown / Darlington, New South Wales, Australia
- Website: sydney.edu.au/pharmacy/

The University of Sydney School of Pharmacy, also known as Sydney Pharmacy School is a constituent body of the University of Sydney, Australia. The first Faculty of Pharmacy in Australia, it began teaching in 1899 with cohorts of 'Materia Medica', with the introduction of the Bachelor of Pharmacy degree itself in 1960. The school is located in its own building, the sandstone Pharmacy and Bank Building, with associated laboratories and academic staff wings below and around. The structure itself is so named because it was rebuilt on the campus grounds, piece by piece, from the facade of the then Commercial Banking Company previously located in Martin Place, in Sydney's CBD, and donated to the University in 1923.

The first female pharmacy graduate in Australia, Louisa Wilson, came from the University of Sydney. The Sydney Pharmacy School's award for the highest overall mark for any finishing undergraduate or postgraduate student is named the Louisa Wilson Award.

On 30 April 2018, Sydney Pharmacy School joined the newly combined Faculty of Medicine and Health at the University of Sydney.

At undergraduate level, Pharmacy offers two vertically-integrated Bachelor/Master degrees: a five-year Bachelor of Pharmacy (Honours)/Master of Pharmacy Practice degree or a six-year Bachelor of Pharmacy and Management (Honours)/Master of Pharmacy Practice degree (introduced in 2023). The previous Bachelor of Pharmacy (4 years) and Bachelor of Pharmacy Management (5 years) degrees admitted their last cohort of students in 2022.

At postgraduate coursework level, Pharmacy offers a graduate-entry Master of Pharmacy coursework degree as well as a Graduate Certificate available to pharmacists, the Graduate Certificate in Pharmacy Practice.

There are two postgraduate research degrees available: the Master of Philosophy and Doctor of Philosophy.

Undergraduate:

- Bachelor of Pharmacy (Honours)/Master of Pharmacy Practice (commenced 2023)
- Bachelor of Pharmacy and Management (Honours)/Master of Pharmacy Practice (commenced 2023)

Postgraduate:

- Master of Pharmacy
- Graduate Certificate in Pharmacy Practice

Research degrees:

- Master of Philosophy (MPhil)
- Doctor of Philosophy (PhD)
