= University of Sydney =

Public research university in Australia

The University of Sydney
- Coat of arms
- Latin: Universitas Sidneiensis
- Motto: Latin: Sidere mens eadem mutato
- Motto in English: "The stars change, the mind remains the same"
- Type: Public research university
- Established: 1 October 1850; 176 years ago
- Accreditation: TEQSA
- Affiliations: Group of Eight (Go8)
- Academic affiliations: APRU; U21; UA
- Endowment: A$4.92 billion (2024)
- Budget: A$3.07 billion (2023)
- Visitor: Governor of New South Wales (ex officio)
- Chancellor: David Thodey
- Vice-Chancellor: Mark Scott
- Academic staff: 3,980 (2024)
- Administrative staff: 5,961 (2024)
- Total staff: 9,941 (2024)
- Students: 70,298 (2024)
- Undergraduates: 40,388 (2024)
- Postgraduates: 29,910 (2024)
- Doctoral students: 3,510 (2024)
- Location: Sydney, New South Wales, Australia; 33°53′15″S 151°11′24″E
- Campus: Urban, regional and parkland
- Colours: Ochre Charcoal
- Sporting affiliations: UniSport; EAEN; UBL
- Website: sydney.edu.au

The University of Sydney (USYD) is a public research university in Sydney, Australia. Founded in 1850, it is the oldest university in both Australia and Oceania. One of Australia's six sandstone universities, it was one of the world's first universities to admit students solely on academic merit, and opened its doors to women on the same basis as men. The university comprises eight academic faculties and university schools, through which it offers bachelor, master and doctoral degrees.

Five Nobel and two Crafoord laureates have been affiliated with the university as graduates and faculty. The university has educated 8 Australian prime ministers, including incumbent Anthony Albanese; 2 governors-general of Australia; 13 premiers of New South Wales; and 26 justices of the High Court of Australia, including 5 chief justices. The university has produced 110 Rhodes Scholars and 19 Gates Scholars. The University of Sydney is a member of the Group of Eight, CEMS, the Association of Pacific Rim Universities and the Association of Commonwealth Universities.

== History ==
=== 1850–1950 ===
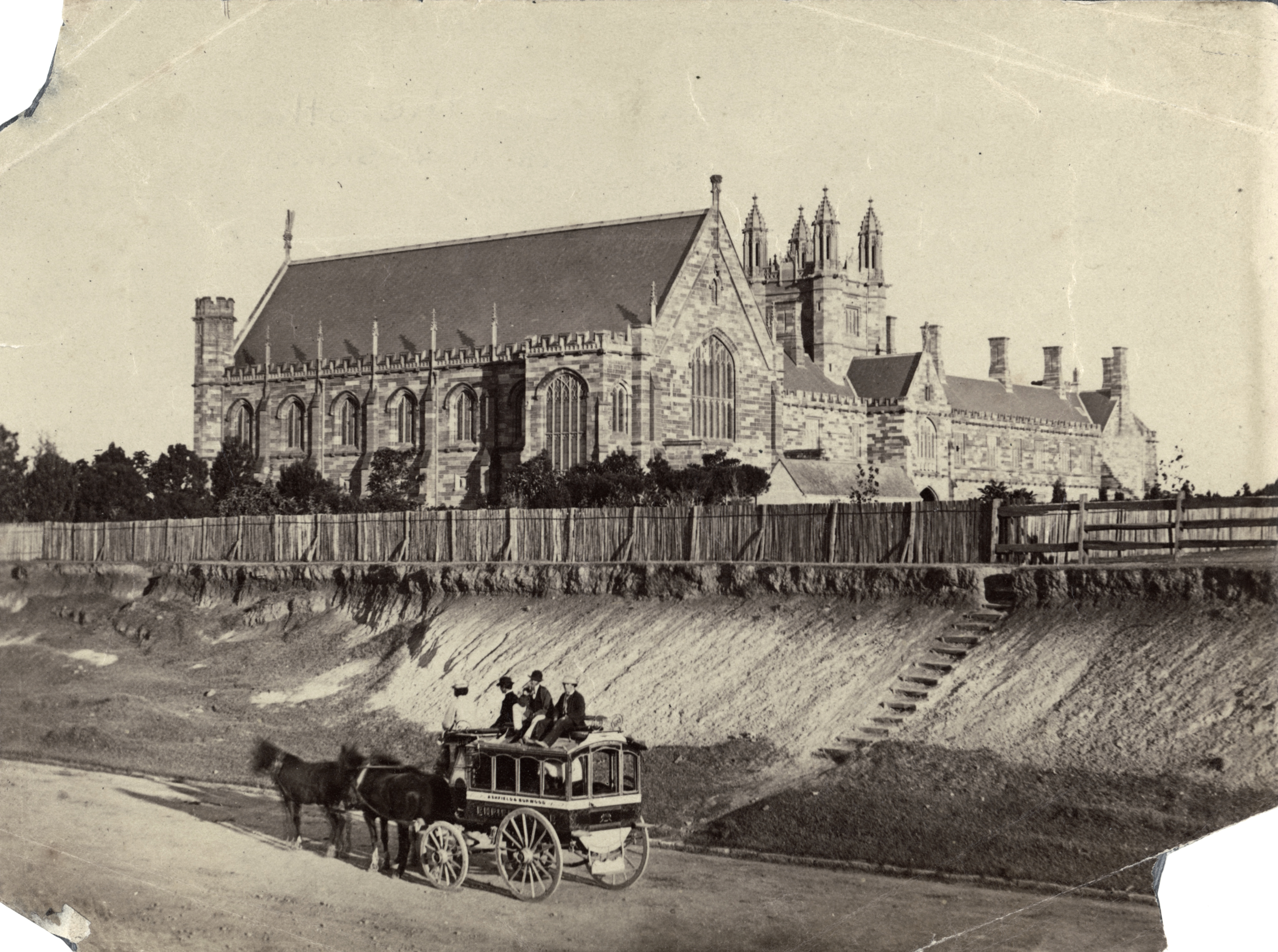
The University of Sydney as viewed from Parramatta Road in the early 1870s

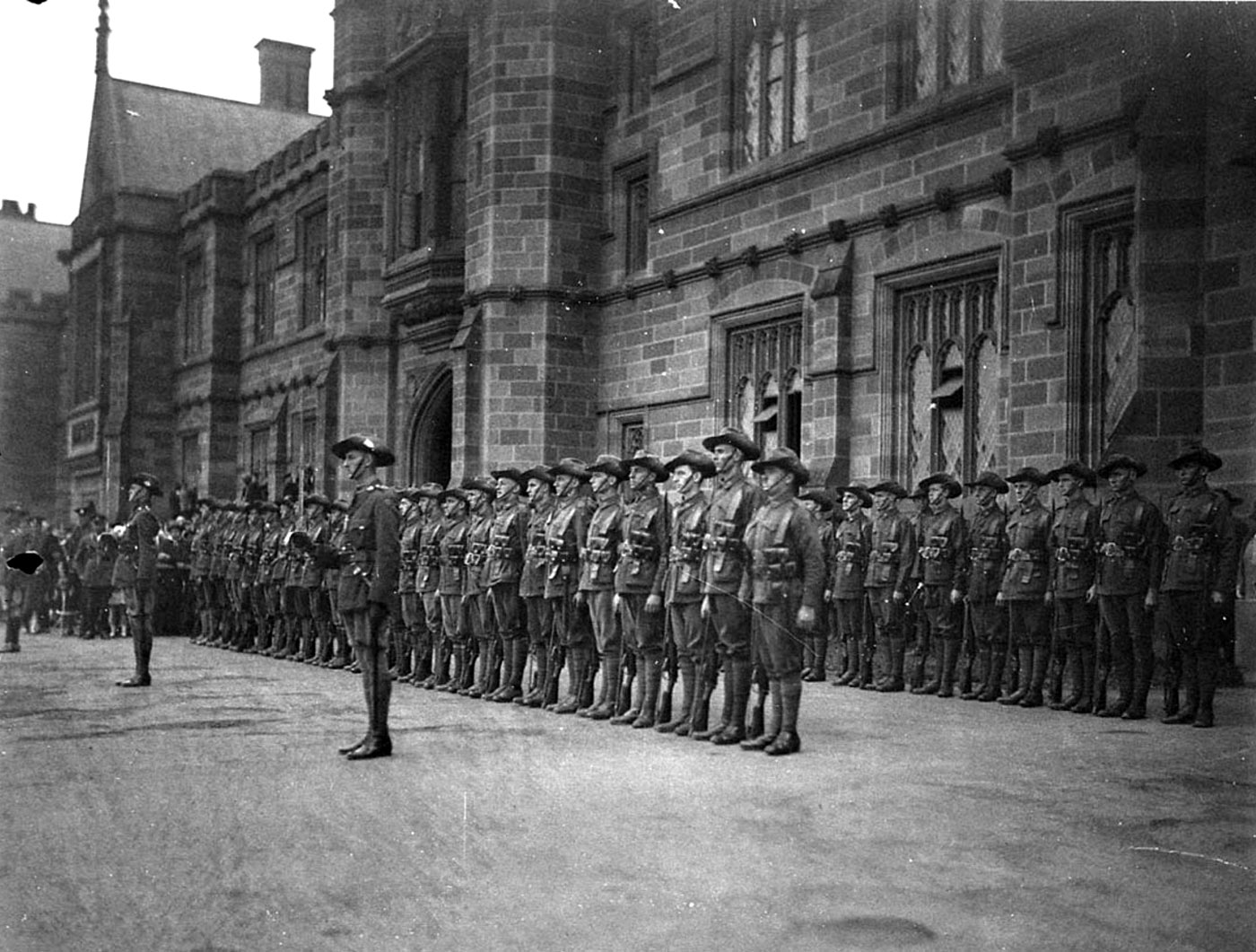
The Sydney University Regiment forming a guard of honour for the visit of the Duke of York (later George VI) to the university in 1927

In 1848, Legislative Council members William Wentworth, a University of Cambridge alumnus, and Sir Charles Nicholson, a University of Edinburgh Medical School alumnus, proposed a plan to expand the existing Sydney College into a university. Wentworth argued that it would provide the opportunity for "the child of every class, to become great and useful in the destinies of his country" and that a state secular university was imperative for a society aspiring towards self-government.

So far from being an institution for the rich, I take It to be an institution for the poor. ... I trust that, from the pregnant womb of this institution will arise a long list of illustrious names—of statesmen—of patriots—of philanthropists—of philosophers—of poets and of heroes, who will shed a deathless halo, not only on their country, but upon the University which called them into being.

He promoted access on the basis of merit rather than religious or social status. It took two attempts on Wentworth's behalf before the plan was finally adopted.

The university was established via the passage of the University of Sydney Act 1850 (NSW) on 24 September 1850, and was assented on 1 October 1850 by Governor Sir Charles Fitzroy. Wentworth was among the first members of the university's senate, mentioned in the governor's proclamation alongside three religious ministers. Two years later, the university was inaugurated on 11 October 1852 in the Big Schoolroom of what is now Sydney Grammar School. The first principal was John Woolley, the first professor of chemistry and experimental physics was John Smith. Sir William Charles Windeyer was the first graduate. The university was Australia's first, as well as being one of the first public, non-denominational and secular universities in the British Empire. On 27 February 1858, the university received a royal charter from Queen Victoria, giving degrees conferred by the university rank and recognition equal to those given by universities in the United Kingdom.

In 1858, the passage of the Electoral Act provided for the university to become a constituency for the New South Wales Legislative Assembly as soon as there were 100 graduates of the university holding higher degrees eligible for candidacy. This seat in the New South Wales legislature was first filled in 1876, but was abolished in 1880, one year after its second member, Sir Edmund Barton, who later became the first Prime Minister of Australia, was elected to the Legislative Assembly.

The university was one of the first in the world to admit women on an equal basis with men, doing so from 1881. In 1885 the first women to receive BA degrees from the university were Mary Elizabeth Brown and Isola Florence Thompson, while Thompson became the first woman to graduate with an MA in 1887.

Most of the estate of John Henry Challis was bequeathed to the university, which received a sum of £200,000 in 1889. This was thanks in part due to Sir William Montagu Manning (chancellor 1878–95) who argued against the claims by British tax commissioners. The following year, seven professorships were created in anatomy, zoology, engineering, history, law, logic and mental philosophy, and modern literature.

In 1924, the university awarded its first Doctor of Science in Engineering degree to John Bradfield. His thesis was titled "The City and Suburban Electric Railways and the Sydney Harbour Bridge". Bradfield went on to be the lead engineer for the construction of the Sydney Harbour Bridge.

The university's professor of philosophy from 1927 to 1958, John Anderson, was a significant figure referred to as "Sydney's best known academic". A native of Scotland, Anderson's controversial views as a self-proclaimed atheist and advocate of free thought in all subjects raised the ire of many, even to the point of being censured by the state legislature in 1943.

=== 1950–2000 ===
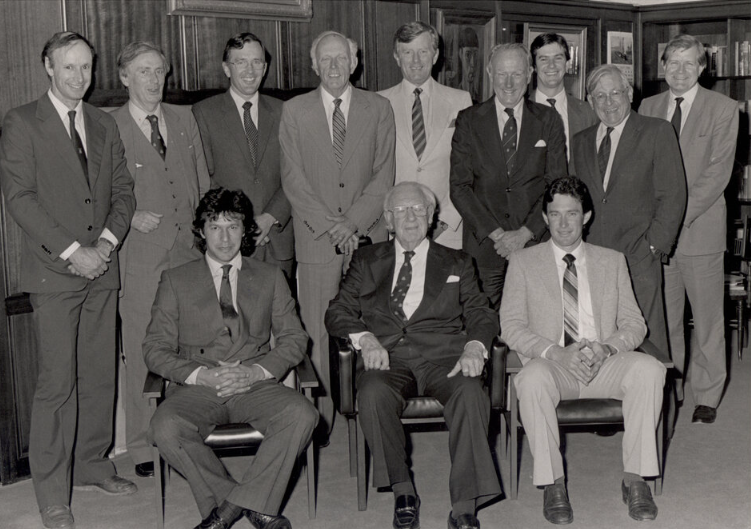
Test cricketer Imran Khan as a guest at a luncheon hosted by Vice-Chancellor John Manning Ward before playing for the university club. Seated: Imran Khan, Chancellor Sir Hermann Black and Coach John Dyson. Standing: Dr Damon Ridley, Vice Chancellor Ward, Stephen Harrison, Hugh McCredie, Keith Jennings, Fred Bennett, Giles Cheadle, Deputy Vice Chancellor John Dunston, and Alan Crompton, 1984.

The PhD research degree was first discussed in 1944 and began in 1947. The university awarded the first PhD in 1951 to William H. Wittrick from the Faculty of Engineering on 28 April 1951 and the next two were awarded to Eleanora C. Gyarfas and George F. Humphrey from the Faculty of Science on 2 May 1951.

The New England University College was founded as part of the University of Sydney in 1938 and in 1954 was separated to become the University of New England.

During the late 1960s, the University of Sydney was at the centre of rows to introduce courses on Marxism and feminism at the major Australian universities. At one stage, newspaper reporters descended on the university to cover brawls, demonstrations, secret memos and a walk-out by David Armstrong, a philosopher who held the Challis Chair of Philosophy from 1959 to 1991, after students at one of his lectures openly demanded a course on feminism. The philosophy department split over the issue into the Traditional and Modern Philosophy Department, headed by Armstrong and following a more traditional approach to philosophy, and the General Philosophy Department, which follows the French continental approach. The Builders Labourers Federation placed a ban on the university after two women tutors were not allowed to teach a course but the issue was quickly resolved internally.

Under the terms of the Higher Education (Amalgamation) Act 1989 (NSW), the following bodies were incorporated into the university in 1990:

- Sydney branch of the Sydney Conservatorium of Music
- Cumberland College of Health Sciences
- Sydney College of the Arts of the Institute of the Arts
- Sydney Institute of Education of the Sydney College of Advanced Education (prior to 1981, named the Sydney Teachers College).
- Institute of Nursing Studies of the Sydney College of Advanced Education
- Guild Centre of the Sydney College of Advanced Education.

The Orange Agricultural College (OAC) was originally transferred to the University of New England under the act, but then transferred to the University of Sydney in 1994, as part of the reforms to the University of New England undertaken by the University of New England Act 1993 and the Southern Cross University Act 1993. In January 2005, the University of Sydney transferred the OAC to Charles Sturt University.

=== 2000s ===
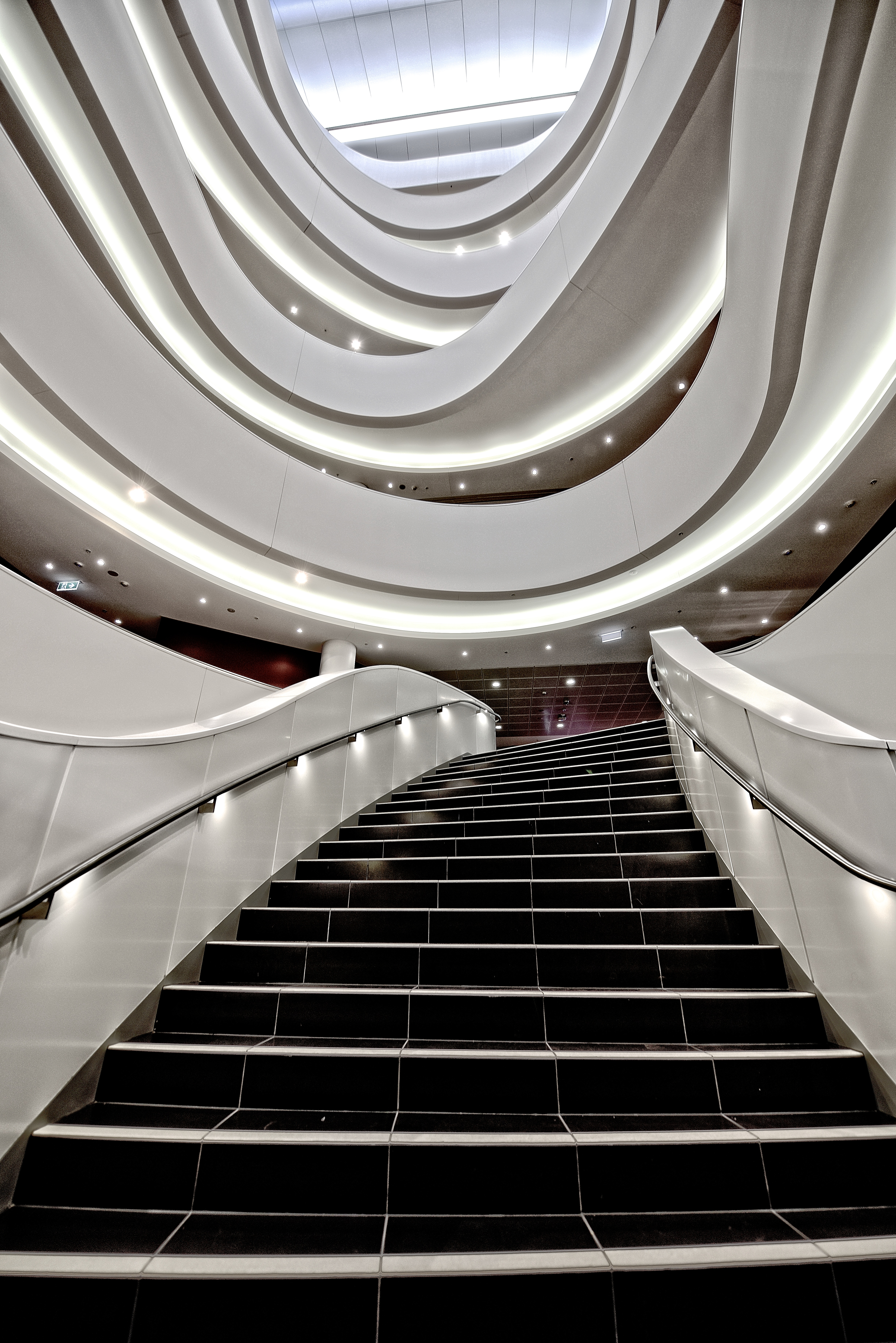
Charles Perkins Centre

In 2001, the University of Sydney chancellor, Dame Leonie Kramer, was forced to resign by the university's governing body. In 2003, Nick Greiner, a former Premier of New South Wales, resigned from his position as chair of the university's Graduate School of Management because of academic protests against his simultaneous chairmanship of British American Tobacco (Australia). Subsequently, his wife, Kathryn Greiner, resigned in protest from the two positions she held at the university as chair of the Sydney Peace Foundation and a member of the executive council of the Research Institute for Asia and the Pacific.

In 2005, the Public Service Association of New South Wales and the Community and Public Sector Union were in dispute with the university over a proposal to privatise security at the main campus (and the Cumberland campus).

In 2007, the university agreed to acquire a portion of the land granted to St John's College (a residential college of the university) to develop the Sydney Institute of Health and Medical Research, now the Charles Perkins Centre, named in honour of the first Indigenous Australian man to graduate from the university, Charles Perkins.

=== 2010s ===
At the start of 2010, the University of Sydney controversially adopted a new logo. It retains the same arms, but they take on a more modern look. There have been stylistic changes, the main one being the coat of arm's mantling, the shape of the escutcheon (shield), the removal of the motto scroll, and also others more subtle within the arms itself, such as the mane and fur of the lion, the number of lines in the open book and the colouration. The original Coat of Arms from 1857 continues to be used for ceremonial and other formal purposes, such as on testamurs.

In 2010, the university received a Pablo Picasso painting from the private collection of an anonymous donor. The painting, Jeune Fille Endormie, which had not been publicly seen since 1939, depicts the artist's lover, Marie-Thérèse Walter and was donated on the strict understanding that it would be sold and the proceeds directed to medical research. The painting was auctioned at Christie's in London and sold for £13.5 million ($20.6 million AUD). The proceeds of the sale funded the establishment of many endowed professorial chairs at the Charles Perkins Centre, where a room dedicated to the painting, now exists.

Action initiated by then-Vice Chancellor Michael Spence to improve the financial sustainability of the university caused controversy among some students and staff. In 2012, Spence led efforts to cut the university's expenditure to address the financial impact of a slowdown in international student enrolments across Australia. This included redundancies of a number of university staff and faculty, though some at the university argued that the institution should have cut back on building programs instead. Critics argued the push for savings was driven by managerial incompetence and indifference, fuelling industrial action during a round of enterprise bargaining in 2013 that also reflected widespread concerns about public funding for higher education.

An internal staff survey in 2012/13, which found widespread dissatisfaction with how the university was being managed. Asked to rate their level of agreement with a series of statements about the university, 19 per cent of those surveyed believed "change and innovation" were handled well by the university. In the survey, 75 per cent of university staff indicated senior executives were not listening to them, while only 22 per cent said change was handled well and 33 per cent said senior executives were good role models.

During Spence's term, the university community was divided over allowing students from an elite private school, Scots College, to enter university via a "pathway of privilege" by means of enrolling in a Diploma of Tertiary Preparation rather than meeting HSC entry requirements. The university charged students $12,000 to take the course and have since successfully admitted a number of students to degree courses. An exposé by Fairfax which turned out to be based on a misunderstanding as to VET and UAC matriculation standards, the scheme has been criticised by Phillip Heath, the national chairman of the Association of Heads of Independent Schools of Australia.

Concerns about public funding for higher education were reflected again in 2014 following the federal government's proposal to deregulate student fees. The university held a wide-ranging consultation process, which included a "town hall meeting" at the university's Great Hall on 25 August 2014, where an audience of students, staff and alumni expressed deep concern about the government's plans and called on university leadership to lobby against the proposals. Throughout 2014, Spence took a leading position among Australian vice-chancellors in repeatedly calling for any change to funding to not undermine equitable access to university while arguing for fee deregulation to raise course costs for the majority of higher education students.

An investigation by Fairfax in 2015 revealed widespread cheating at universities across NSW, including the University of Sydney. The university later established a taskforce on academic misconduct to reduce cheating and academic misconduct.

In 2016, the university introduced plans to consolidate existing degrees to reduce the overall number of programs it offered. In the 2019 Student Experience Survey, the University of Sydney recorded the second lowest student satisfaction rating out of all Australian universities, and the second lowest student satisfaction rating out of all New South Wales universities, with an overall satisfaction rating of 74.2; this was lower than the national average rating of 78.4.

=== 2020s ===
In the 2021 National Student Safety Survey (NSSS) on sexual assault and harassment on university campuses, the University of Sydney recorded the lowest response rate with nearly a fifth (18.5%) of student respondents reporting experiencing sexual harassment since starting university and 6.7% experiencing sexual assault.

In 2022, the university's National Tertiary Education Union voted to go on strike for 48 hours, demanding an end to job insecurity, protection of academics' right to a 40 per cent research component in their workload, a pay rise, enforceable targets for Aboriginal and Torres Strait Islander employment, and improved rights for professional members.

Starting on 23 April 2024, as a protest of the Gaza war, pro-Palestinian students and staff of the university began occupying part of campus.

== Campuses and buildings ==
=== Main campus ===
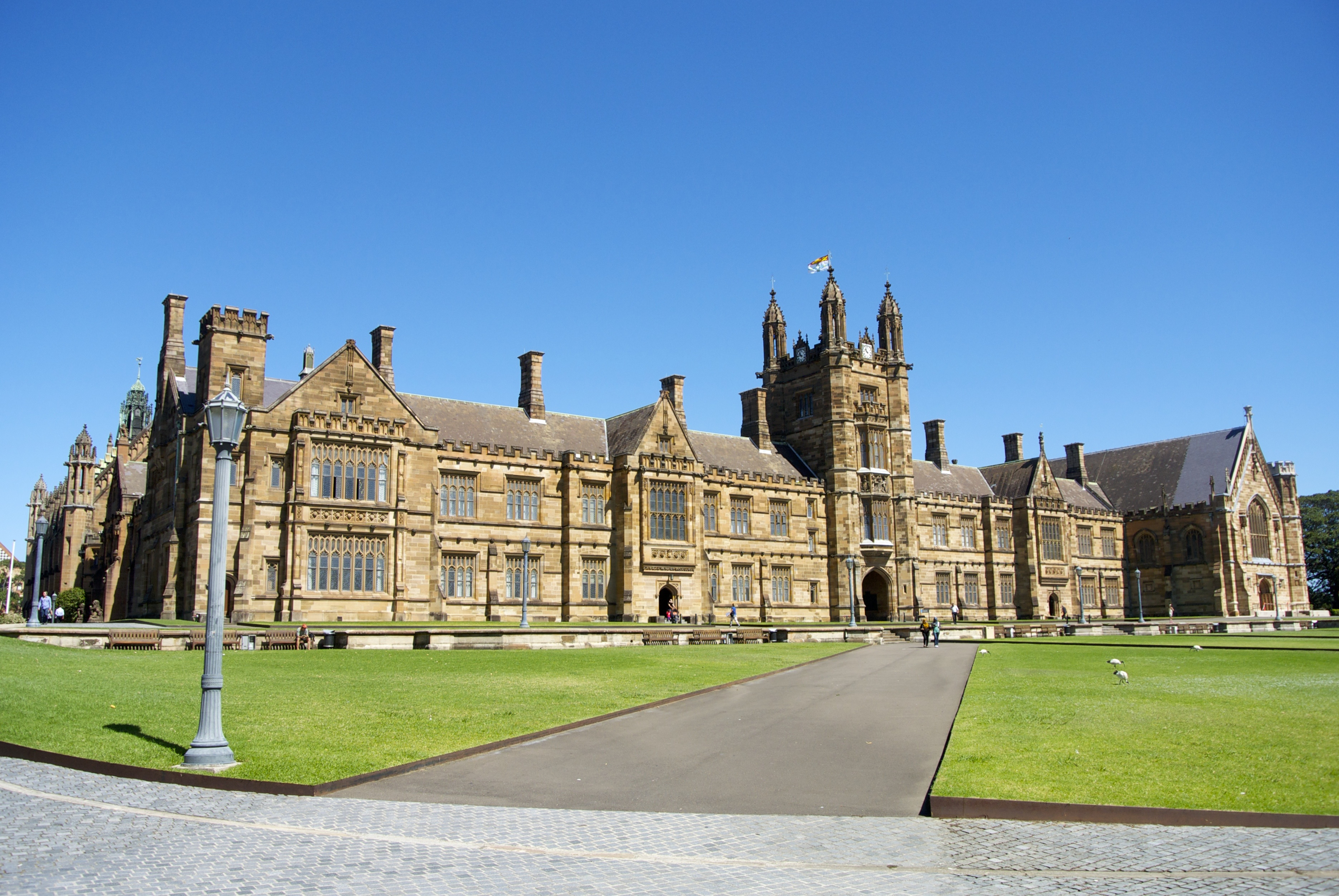
The Quad Building

The main campus is spread across the inner-city suburbs of Camperdown and Darlington, and has been noted for its beautiful architecture and quadrangle.

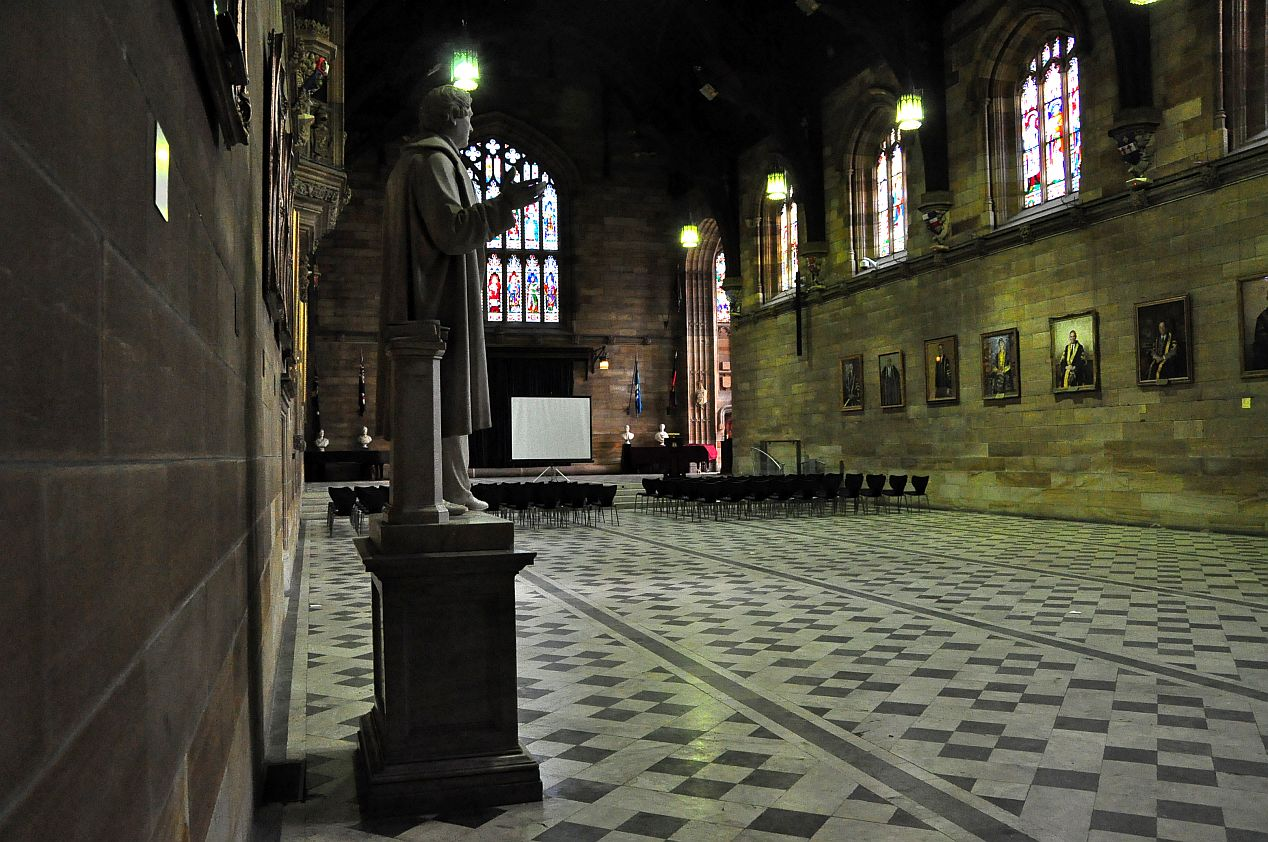
The Great Hall, with a statue of founder William Charles Wentworth in the foreground

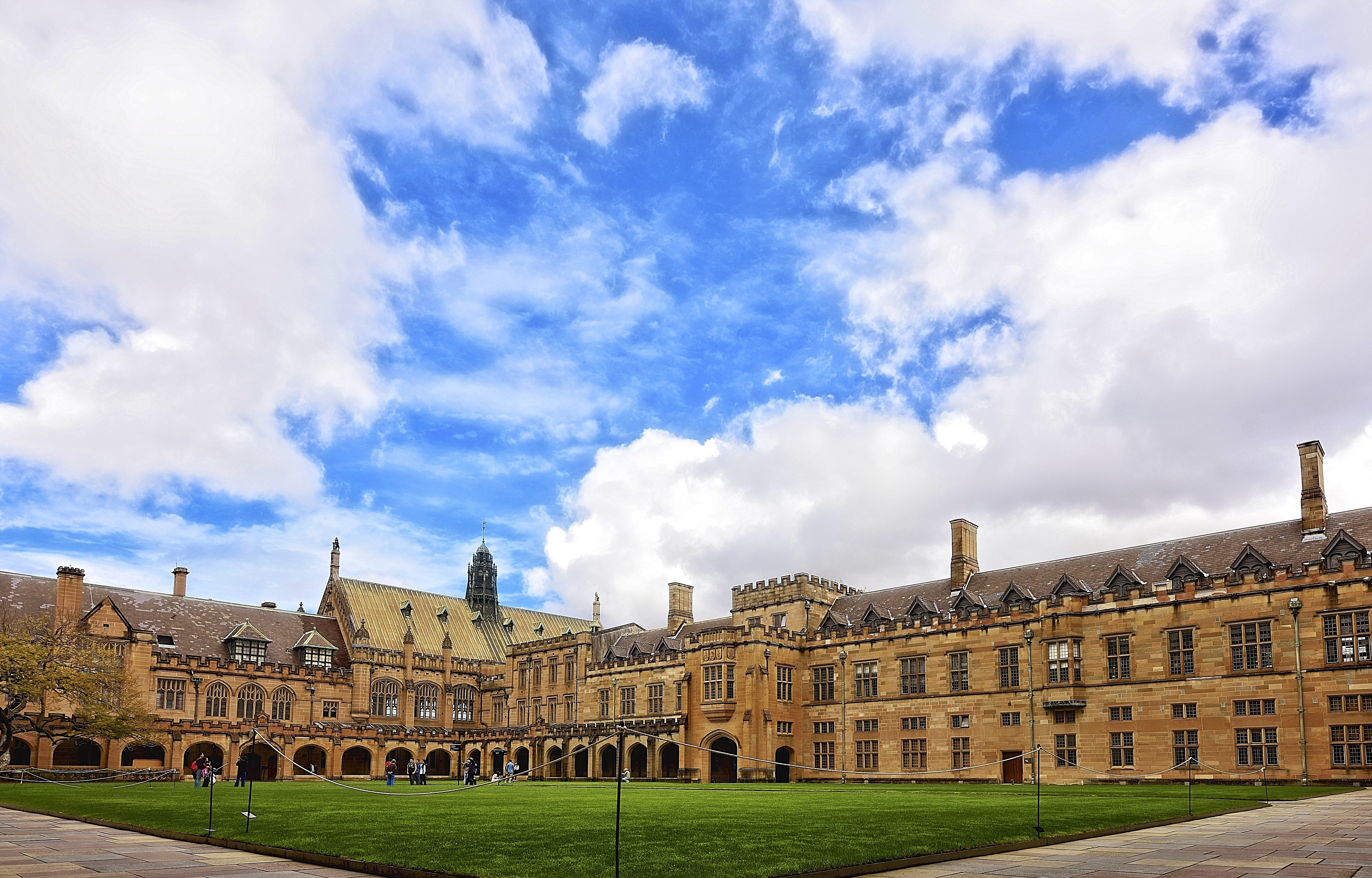
The Quadrangle

Originally housed in what is now Sydney Grammar School, in 1855 the government granted land in Grose Farm to the university, three kilometres from the city, which is now the main Camperdown campus. In 1854, the architect Edmund Blacket accepted a senate invitation for the first buildings to be designed. In 1858 the Great Hall was finished, and in 1859 the Main Building was built. He composed the original Neo-Gothic sandstone Quadrangle and Great Tower buildings, which were completed in 1862. The rapid expansion of the university in the mid-20th century resulted in the acquisition of land in Darlington across City Road. The Camperdown/Darlington campus houses the university's administrative headquarters, and the Faculties of Arts, Science, Education and Social Work, Pharmacy, Veterinary Science, Economics and Business, Architecture, and Engineering. It is also the home base of the large Sydney Medical School, which has numerous affiliated teaching hospitals across the state.

The main campus is also the focus of the university's student life, with the student-run University of Sydney Union (once referred to as "the Union", but now known as "the USU") in possession of three buildings – Wentworth, Manning and Holme Buildings. These buildings house a large proportion of the university's catering outlets, and provide space for recreational rooms, bars and function centres. One of the largest activities organised by the Union is Welcome Week (formerly Orientation Week or 'O-week'), a three-day festival at the start of the academic year. Welcome Week centres on stalls set up by clubs and societies on the Front Lawns.

The main campus is home to a variety of statues, artworks, and monuments. These include the Gilgamesh Statue and the Confucius Statue.

Some other architects associated with the university were Walter Liberty Vernon, Walter Burley Griffin, Leslie Wilkinson, and the New South Wales Government Architect. The building was designed in accordance with the university's masterplan by the architect and founding dean of the university's architecture faculty, Leslie Wilkinson, who himself was inspired by a previously unused masterplan developed for the campus by Walter Burley Griffin in 1915.

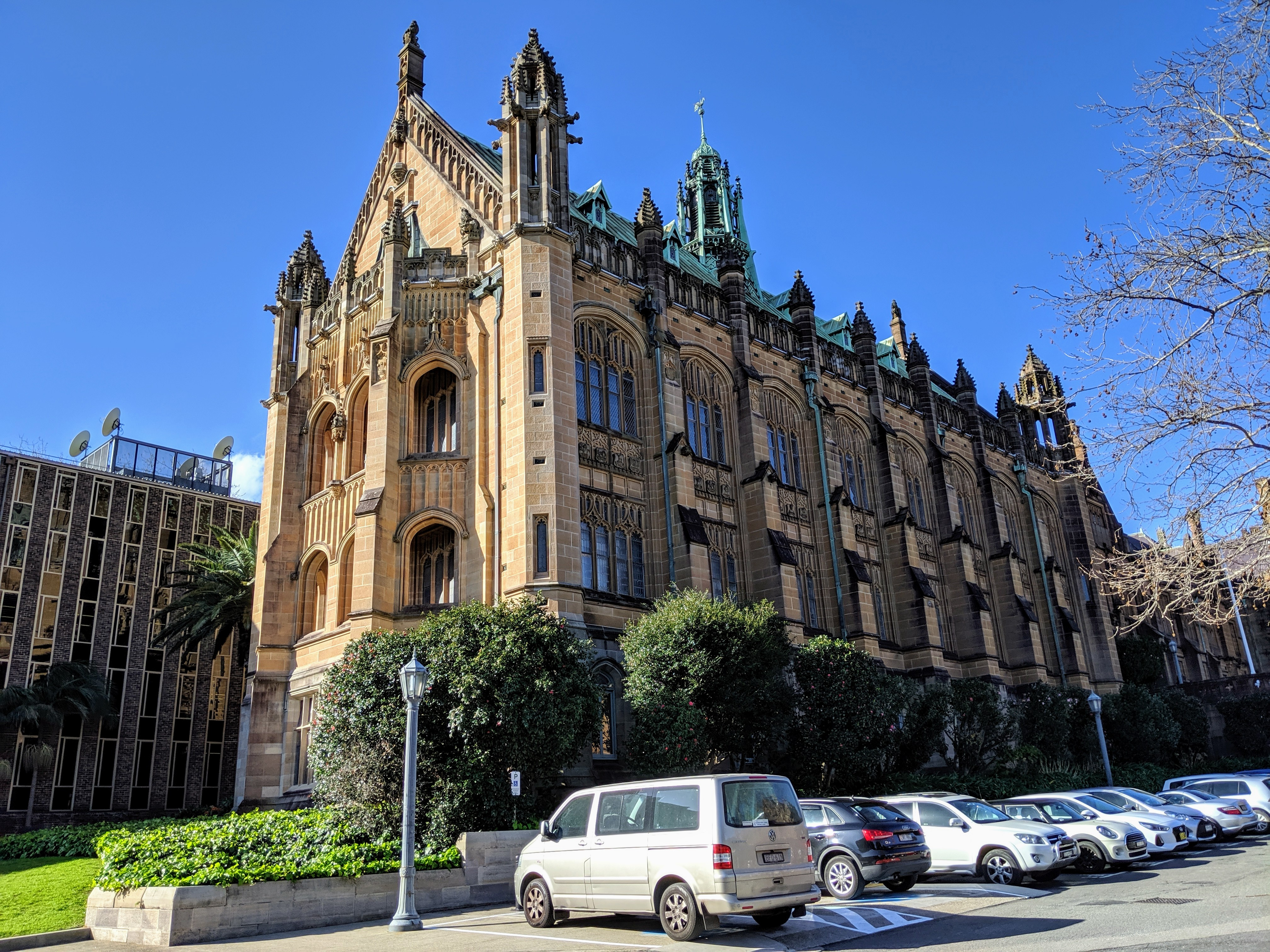
The MacLaurin Hall

The 2002 conservation plan of the university stated that the Main Building and Quadrangle, Anderson Stuart Building, Gate Lodges, St Paul's College, St John's College and St Andrew's College "comprise what is arguably the most important group of Gothic and Tudor Revival style architecture in Australia, and the landscape and grounds features associated with these buildings, including Victoria Park, contribute to and support the existence and appreciation of their architectural qualities and aesthetic significance."

In 2015, The NSW Department of Planning and Environment endorsed The University of Sydney's $1.4 billion Campus Improvement Plan which involved a number of new important structures and renovations.

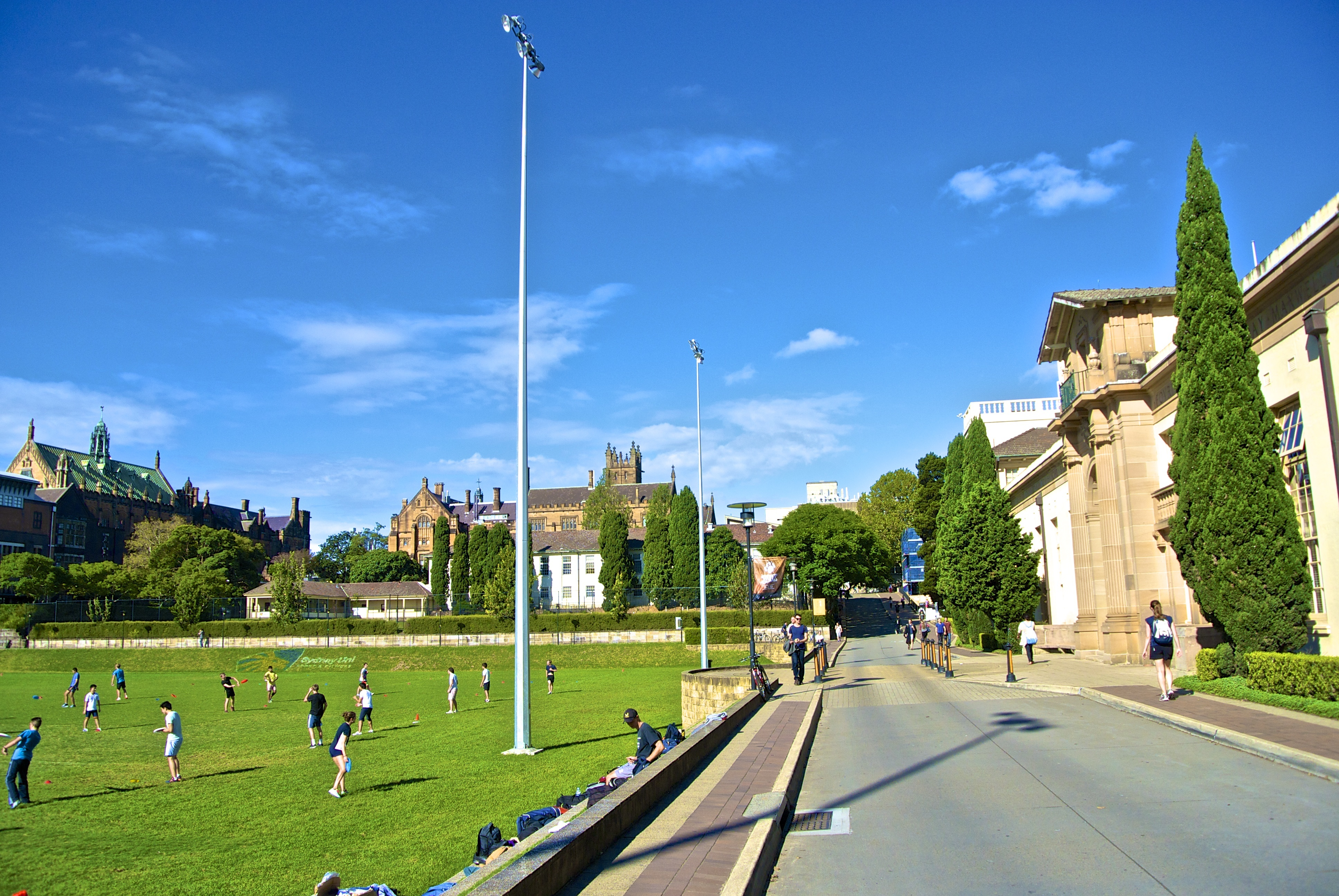
Sports fields along Physics Road

As of 2016, the university is undertaking a large capital works program with the aim of revitalising the campus and providing more office, teaching and student space. The program will see the amalgamation of the smaller science and technical libraries into a larger library, and the construction of a central administration and student services building along City Road. A new building for the School of Information Technologies opened in late 2006 and has been located on a site adjacent to the Seymour Centre. The busy Eastern Avenue thoroughfare has been transformed into a pedestrian plaza and a new footbridge has been built over City Road. The new home for the Sydney Law School, located alongside Fisher Library on the site of the old Edgeworth David and Stephen Roberts buildings, has been completed. The university opened a new building called "Abercrombie Building" for business school students in early 2016.

The NSW state government has reduced transport links to the old campus and the closest Redfern railway station leaving main access to buses on the neighbouring Parramatta Road and City Road, prioritising the growth at other Sydney universities.

From 2007, the university has used space in the former Eveleigh railway yards, just to the south of Darlington, for examination purposes.

In 2018, New South Wales Minister for Heritage, Gabrielle Upton agreed to put the University of Sydney and some adjacent sites on the state heritage register, creating a conservation area that would include the Camperdown campus, and the nearby Victoria Park.

The beginning of 2021 saw the closure of the Cumberland campus, with a number of health disciplines moving to the Camperdown campus in the state-of-the-art, purpose built Susan Wakil Health Building.

=== Satellite campuses ===
- Sydney Dental Hospital located in Surry Hills and the Westmead Centre for Oral Health is attached to Westmead Hospital.
- The Sydney Conservatorium of Music: Formerly the NSW State Conservatorium of Music, the Sydney Conservatorium of Music (SCM) is located in the Sydney CBD on the edge of Sydney's Royal Botanic Garden, a short distance from the Sydney Opera House. It became a faculty of the university in the 1990s and incorporates the main campus Department of Music, which was the subject of the documentary Facing the Music.
- Camden campus: Located in one of the most rapidly growing peri-urban areas in the country, Sydney's southwest. The Camden campus houses lecture theatres, research institutes, veterinary clinics and research farms for bioscience, environmental science, agriculture and veterinary science.
- Sydney CBD campus: The University of Sydney Business School CBD campus is located on Castlereagh Street in the heart of Sydney's CBD close to Town Hall station.

The university also uses a number of other facilities for its teaching activities.

- Sydney Medical School has eight clinical schools at its affiliated hospitals, responsible for clinical education at the hospitals.
- Sydney Pharmacy School is one of the smaller at the university, and is positioned with its own building, the sandstone Pharmacy and Bank Building, with associated laboratories and academic staff wings below and around
- One Tree Island is an island situated within the World Heritage Site Great Barrier Reef Marine Park about 20 km east-southeast of Heron Island and about 90 km east-northeast of Gladstone on the Queensland coast, and hosts a tropical marine research station of the School of Geosciences.
- The IA Watson Grains Research Centre located at Narrabri in north-central New South Wales is a research station of the Faculty of Agriculture and Environment.
- The Molonglo Observatory is located in Hoskinstown, near Canberra.
- Maningrida is a base camp for scientific expeditions in the Northern Territory.
- Arthursleigh is an agricultural estate located near Goulburn.
- The Power Institute of Fine Arts offers an annual residency to Australian artists and writers at Cité internationale des arts in Paris, France.
- The Australian Archaeological Institute at Athens is located in Athens, Greece.
- Taylors College at Waterloo in Sydney is operated by Navitas for its Foundation Program, catering to international students wishing to enter the university.
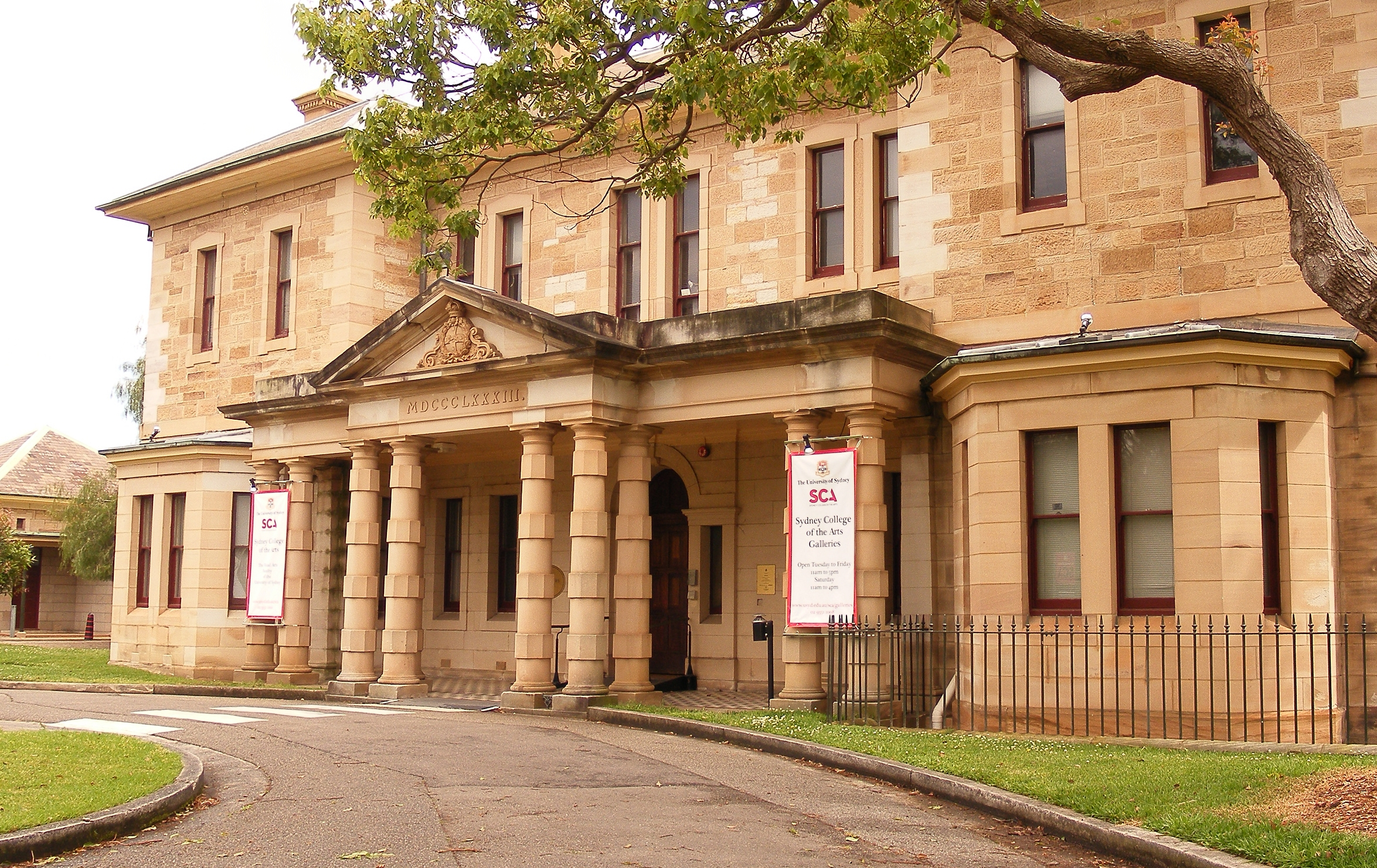
Sydney College of the Arts

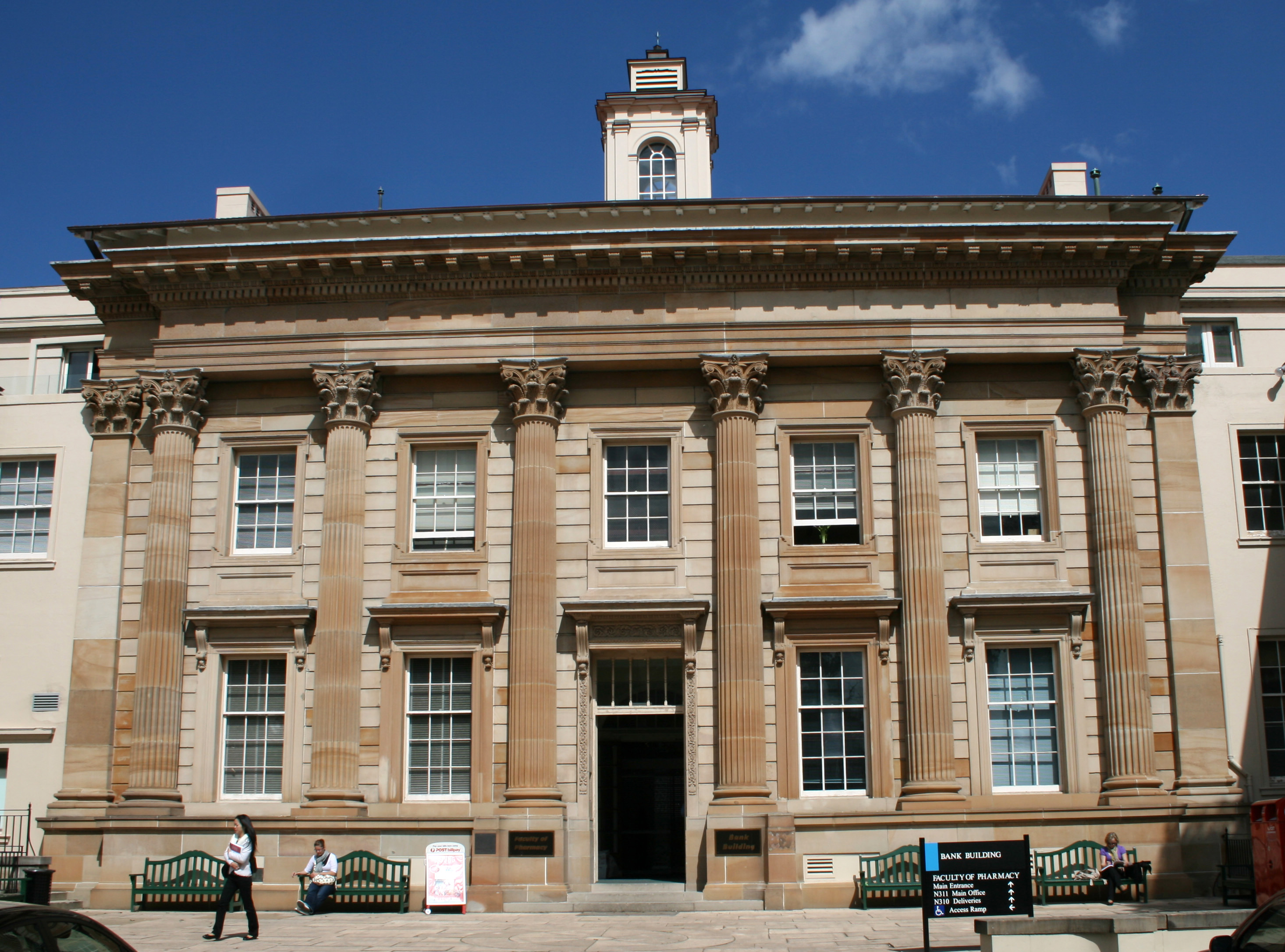
Sydney Pharmacy School

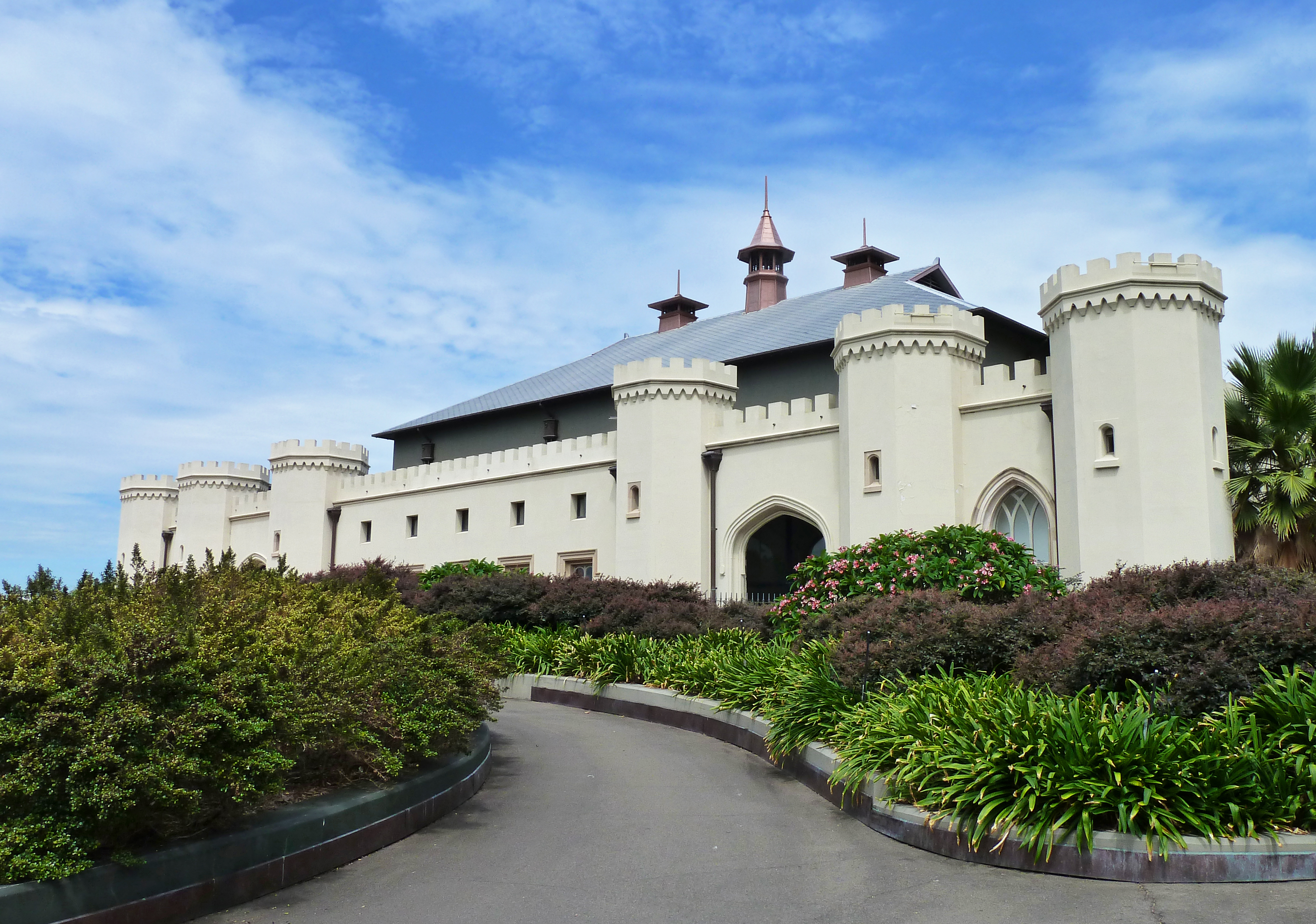
Sydney Conservatorium of Music

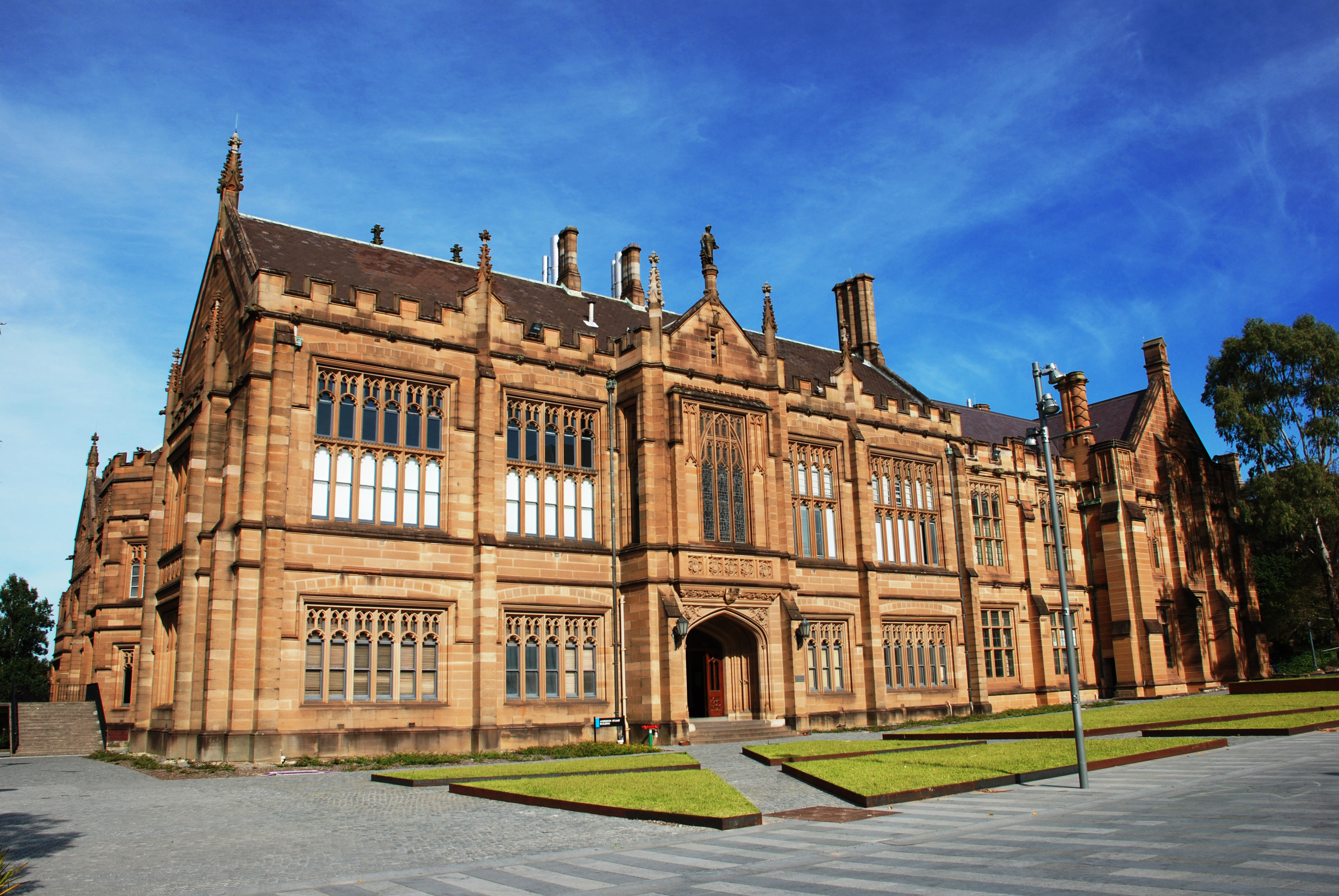
Sydney Medical School

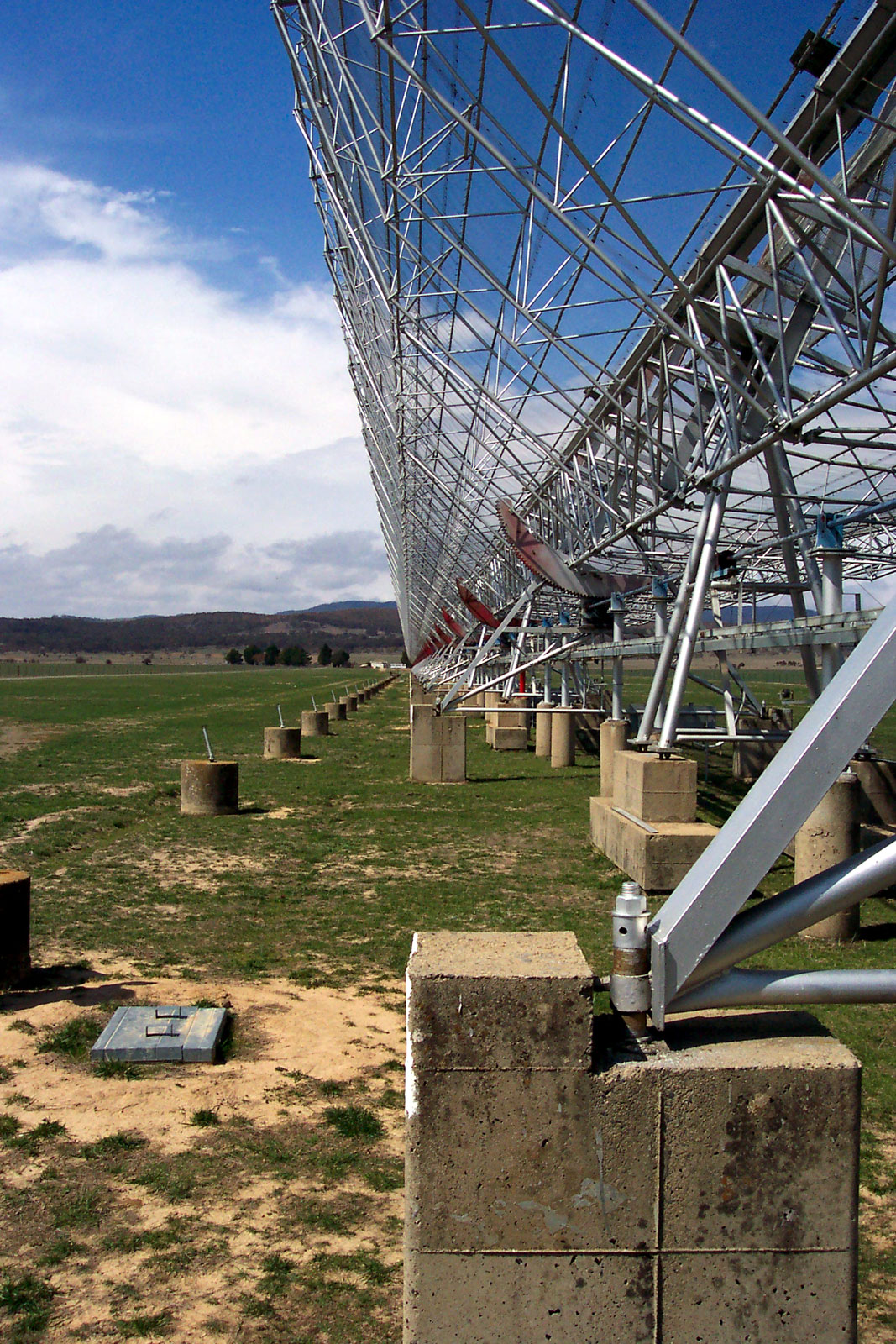
Molonglo Observatory

=== Affiliated colleges ===
Affiliated with the university are five denominational, one Jewish and one women's college. Unlike some residential colleges in British or American universities, the colleges are not affiliated with any specific discipline of study.

University of Sydney residential colleges
St Paul's College 1851–present (Anglican)	St John's College 1857–present (Roman Catholic)	St Andrew's College 1867–present (Presbyterian, now non-denominational)	The Women's College 1894–present (Women)	Wesley College 1917–present (Methodist, now Uniting Church)
Sancta Sophia College 1918–present (Roman Catholic)	Mandelbaum House; 1996–present (Jewish)			

=== Halls of residence ===
The halls of residence are owned by the university and operated by UniLodge, under supervision from the University Accommodation Service. Starting in 2013, the university committed to creating the Halls of Residence (an additional 4,000-6,000 residential places) at an affordable price to enhance the educational experience of living on campus and to offer more students a rich academic environment in which to live.

- The Queen Mary Building
- Abercrombie Student Accommodation
- Regiment Student Accommodation
- Kensington Student Accommodation

The University Student Accommodation Service were awarded the Asia-Pacific Student Housing Operation of the Year & Excellence in Facility Development and Management in 2016.

The Student Accommodation Service and the Mana Yura Student Support Service were the first in Australia to implement an Aboriginal and Torres Strait Islander On-Campus Residence Halls Scholarship Guarantee.

Additionally, the university owns and has operated International House until its closure in 2021.

There is a university-affiliated housing cooperative, Stucco.

== Governance and structure ==
=== Faculties and departments ===
The university comprises eight faculties and schools:

- Faculty of Arts and Social Sciences
- University of Sydney Business School
- Faculty of Engineering
- Faculty of Medicine and Health
- Faculty of Science
- Sydney School of Architecture, Design and Planning
- Sydney Conservatorium of Music
- Sydney Law School

The five largest faculties and schools by 2020 student enrolments were (in descending order): Arts and Social Sciences; Medicine and Health; Business; Science; Engineering. Together they constituted nearly 88% of the university's students and each had a student enrolment over 8,000 (at least 13% of total students).

==== Centre for Continuing education ====
The Centre for Continuing Education is an adult education provider within the university. Extension lectures at the university were inaugurated in 1886, 36 years after the university's founding, making it Australia's longest running university continuing education program.

==== Centre for International Security Studies ====
The Centre for International Security Studies (CISS) at The University of Sydney is an academic research centre focused on international security, global politics, and the intersection of security with various global challenges. The current director is James Der Derian.

=== Finances and endowment ===
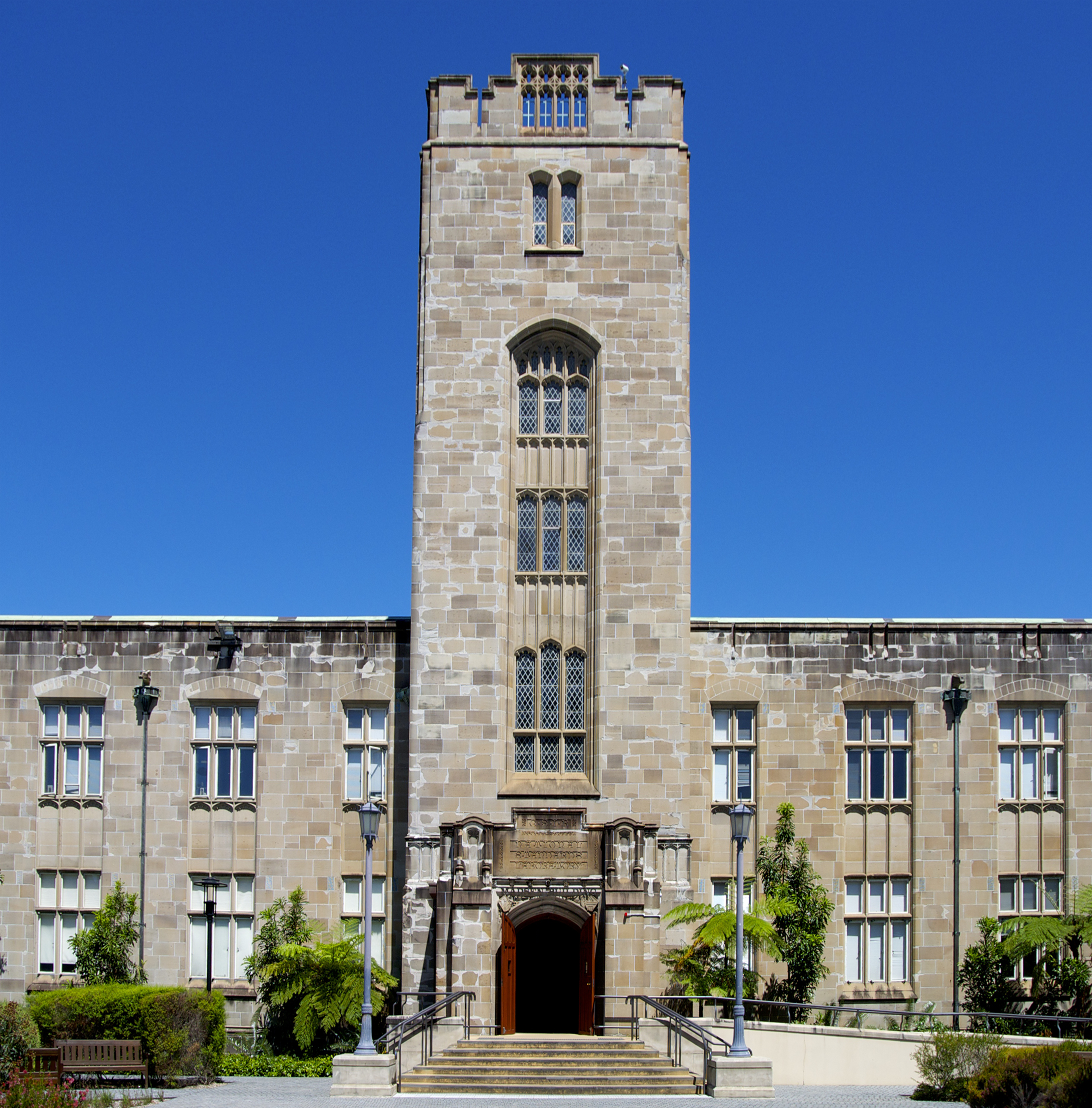
The Madsen Building (former headquarters of CSIRO)

The university has the highest annual revenues of any Australian university. It also has received a number of significant bequests and legacies over its history. The following are current professorships (chairs), funds, fellowships and scholarships which are funded by bequests and legacies and named after benefactors:

- Douglas Burrows Chair of Paediatrics and Child Health
- John Challis Bequest for chairs in Law, International Law, Jurisprudence, Anatomy, Biology, Civil Engineering, English Literature, History and philosophy (see Challis Professorship)
- Carlyle Greenwell Research Fund in Anthropology and Archaeology
- Edwin Cuthbert Hall Chair of Middle Eastern Archaeology
- Mitchell Notaras Fellowship in Colorectal Surgery
- Robert W Storr Chair for Hepatic Medicine
- The Peter Nicol Russell Undergraduate Scholarship

=== Heraldry and insignia ===
==== Coat of arms ====
Arms used in the University of Sydney logo, pre-2010

The Grant of Arms was made by the College of Arms in 1857. The grant reads:

Argent on a Cross Azure an open book proper, clasps Gold, between four Stars of eight points Or, on a chief Gules a Lion passant Guardant also Or, together with this motto "Sidere mens eadem mutato" to be borne and used forever hereafter by the said University of Sydney on their Common Seal, Shields or otherwise according to the Law of Arms.

The use of eight-pointed stars was unusual for arms at the time, although they had been used unofficially as emblems for New South Wales since the 1820s and on the arms of the Church of England Diocese of Australia in 1836.

According to the university, the Latin motto Sidere mens eadem mutato can be translated to "the stars change, the mind remains the same." Francis Merewether, Vice-Chancellor and later Chancellor, in 1857 proposed "Coelum non animum mutant" from Horace (Ep.1.11.27) but after objections changed it to a metrical version including "Sidus" (Star), a neat reference to the Southern Cross and perhaps the Sydney family link with Sir Philip Sidney's "Astrophel (Star-Lover) & Stella (Star)". Author and university alumnus Clive James quipped in his 1981 autobiography that the motto loosely implies "Sydney University is really Oxford or Cambridge laterally displaced approximately 12,000 miles."

== Academic profile ==
=== Libraries and archives ===
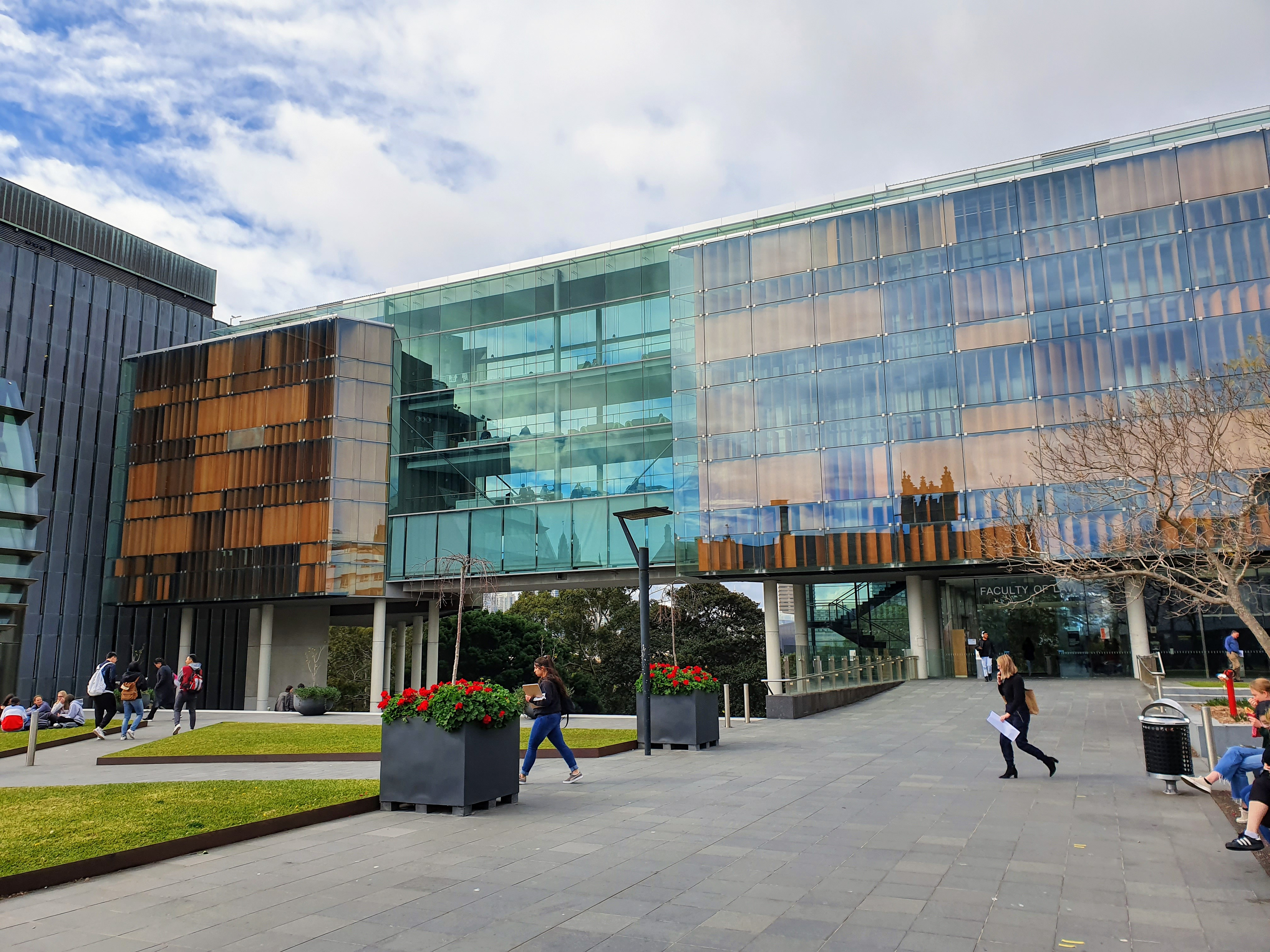
Library of the Sydney Law School

The University of Sydney Library consists of 11 individual libraries located across the university's various campuses. The Fisher and Health sciences libraries offer disability support services. According to the library's publications, it is the largest academic library in the Southern Hemisphere; university statistics show that in 2008 the collection consisted of 5.186 million items. It is also the only university in Australia to be a state legal deposit library according to the Copyright Act 1968 which stipulates that a copy of every printed material published in NSW be sent to the University Library. The Rare Books Library possesses several extremely rare items, including one of the two extant copies of the Gospel of Barnabas and a first edition of Sir Isaac Newton's Philosophiae Naturalis Principia Mathematica.

The Rare Books Library is a part of the Fisher Library and holds 185,000 books and manuscripts which are rare, valuable or fragile, including 80 medieval manuscripts, works by Galileo, Halley and Copernicus as well as an extensive collection of Australiana. The copy of the Gospel of Barnabas and a first edition of Philosophiae Naturalis Principia Mathematica by Sir Isaac Newton are held here. Regular exhibitions of rare books are held in the exhibition room.

=== Museums and galleries ===
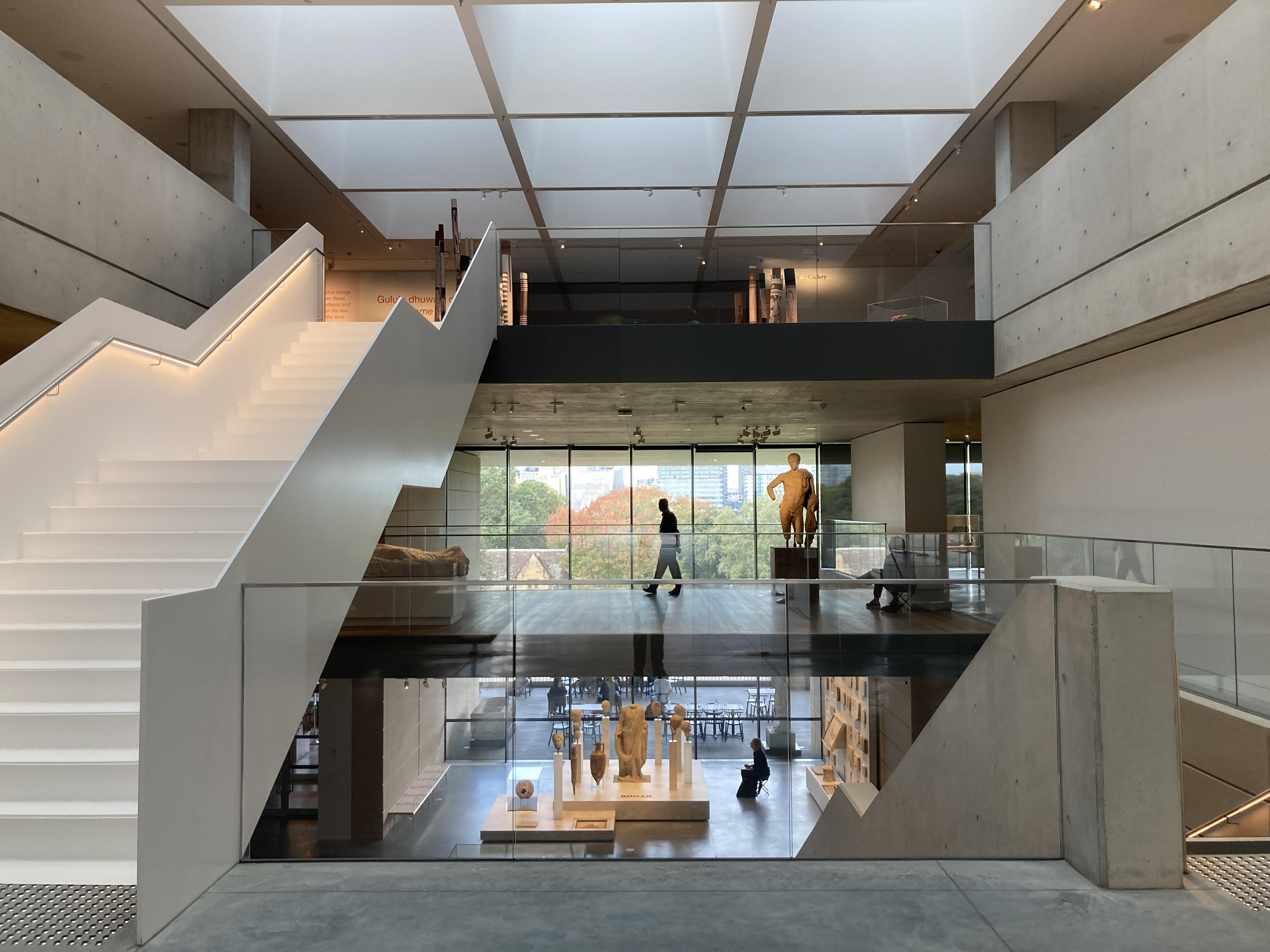
The interior of the Chau Chak Wing Museum

The Chau Chak Wing Museum showcases the university's art, natural history and antiquities collections. Located opposite the quadrangle buildings, the museum opened to the public in November 2020. It houses the Nicholson Collection of antiquities, the Macleay Collections of natural history, ethnography, science and photography, and the University Art Collection. The museum is named after Chau Chak Wing, a Chinese-Australian businessman and philanthropist. In 2021, the Chau Chak Wing Museum won the Museums and Galleries National Award (MAGNA) and two Museums Australasia Multimedia and Publication Design Awards (MAPDA).

==== Collections ====
- The Nicholson Collection of archaeology is the largest collection of antiquities in Australia. The Nicholson Museum was founded in 1860 by the donation of Sir Charles Nicholson (Sydney University's second chancellor 1854–1862). It is also the country's oldest university museum and features ancient artefacts from Egypt, the Middle East, Greece, Rome, Cyprus and Mesopotamia, collected by the university over many years and added to by recent archaeological expeditions. The museum was located in the historic Main Quadrangle at the university. The Nicholson Museum closed to the public in 2020, ahead of the opening of the Chau Chak Wing Museum.
- The Macleay Collection is named after Alexander Macleay, whose collection of insects begun in the late 18th century was the basis upon which the Macleay Museum was founded in 1887. It is the oldest collection of natural history in Australia and has developed into a major collection of natural history specimens, ethnographic artefacts, scientific instruments and historic photographs. The Macleay Museum closed to the public in 2016 ahead of the opening of the Chau Chak Wing Museum.
- The University Art Collection was founded in the 1860s and contains more than 7,000 pieces, constantly growing through donation, bequests and acquisition. The University Art Gallery opened in 1959. The gallery hosted numerous exhibitions until 1972, when it was taken over for office space. The gallery closed to the public in 2016 ahead of the opening of the Chau Chak Wing Museum.

==== Other galleries ====
- Verge Gallery is run by the University of Sydney Union and showcases contemporary art by emerging artists.

=== Academic reputation ===
View source data.

University rankings

Global – Overall
- ARWU World: 72 (2025)
- CWTS World: 42 (Note: The CWTS Leiden Ranking is based on P (top 10%).) (2024)
- QS World: =25 (2026)
- QS Employability: 4 (2022)
- THE World: =53 (2026)
- THE Reputation: 60 (2025)
- USNWR Global: 29 (25/26)

National – Overall
- ARWU National: 3 (2025)
- CWTS National: 3 (2024)
- ERA National: 3 (2018)
- QS National: 3 (2026)
- THE National: 2 (2026)
- USNWR National: 1 (25/26)
- AFR National: 6 (2025)

In the 2024 Aggregate Ranking of Top Universities, which measures aggregate performance across the QS, THE and ARWU rankings, the university attained a position of #47 (2nd nationally).

National publications

In the Australian Financial Review Best Universities Ranking 2025, the university was ranked #6 amongst Australian universities.

Global publications

In the 2026 Quacquarelli Symonds World University Rankings (published 2025), the university attained a tied position of #25 (3rd nationally).

In the Times Higher Education World University Rankings 2026 (published 2025), the university attained a tied position of #53 (2nd nationally).

In the 2025 Academic Ranking of World Universities, the university attained a position of #72 (3rd nationally).

In the 2025–2026 U.S. News & World Report Best Global Universities, the university attained a position of #29 (1st nationally).

In the CWTS Leiden Ranking 2024, the university attained a position of #42 (3rd nationally).

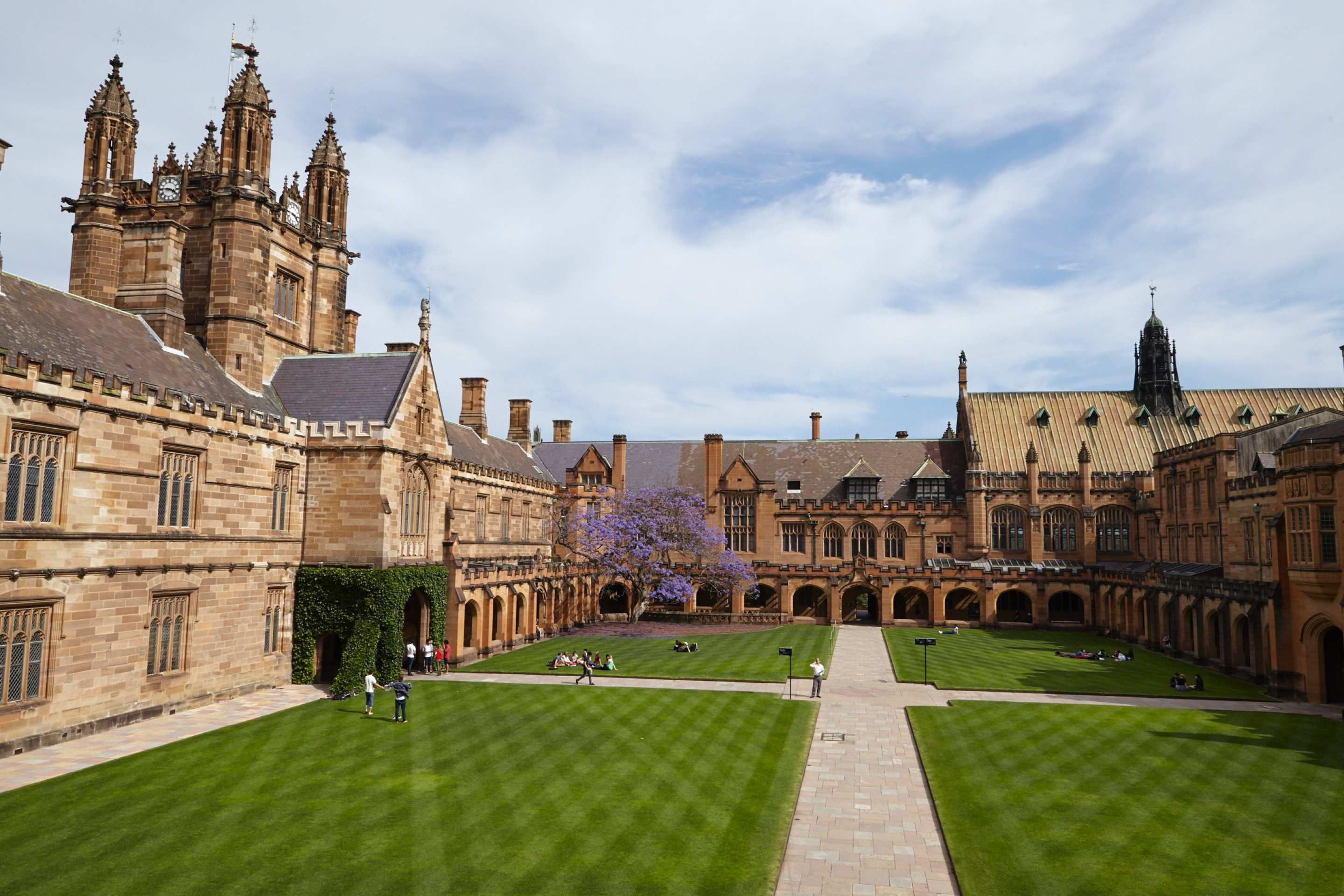
The University of Sydney is consistently one of the highest-ranking universities in Australia

=== Student outcomes ===
The Australian Government's QILT (Note: Abbreviation for Quality Indicators for Learning and Teaching.) conducts national surveys documenting the student life cycle from enrolment through to employment. These surveys place more emphasis on criteria such as student experience, graduate outcomes and employer satisfaction than perceived reputation, research output and citation counts.

In the 2023 Employer Satisfaction Survey, graduates of the university had an overall employer satisfaction rate of 89.6%.

In the 2023 Graduate Outcomes Survey, graduates of the university had a full-time employment rate of 80.9% for undergraduates and 89% for postgraduates. The initial full-time salary was A$70,000 for undergraduates and A$96,000 for postgraduates.

In the 2023 Student Experience Survey, undergraduates at the university rated the quality of their entire educational experience at 71.7% meanwhile postgraduates rated their overall education experience at 70.8%.

== Student life ==
=== Student union ===
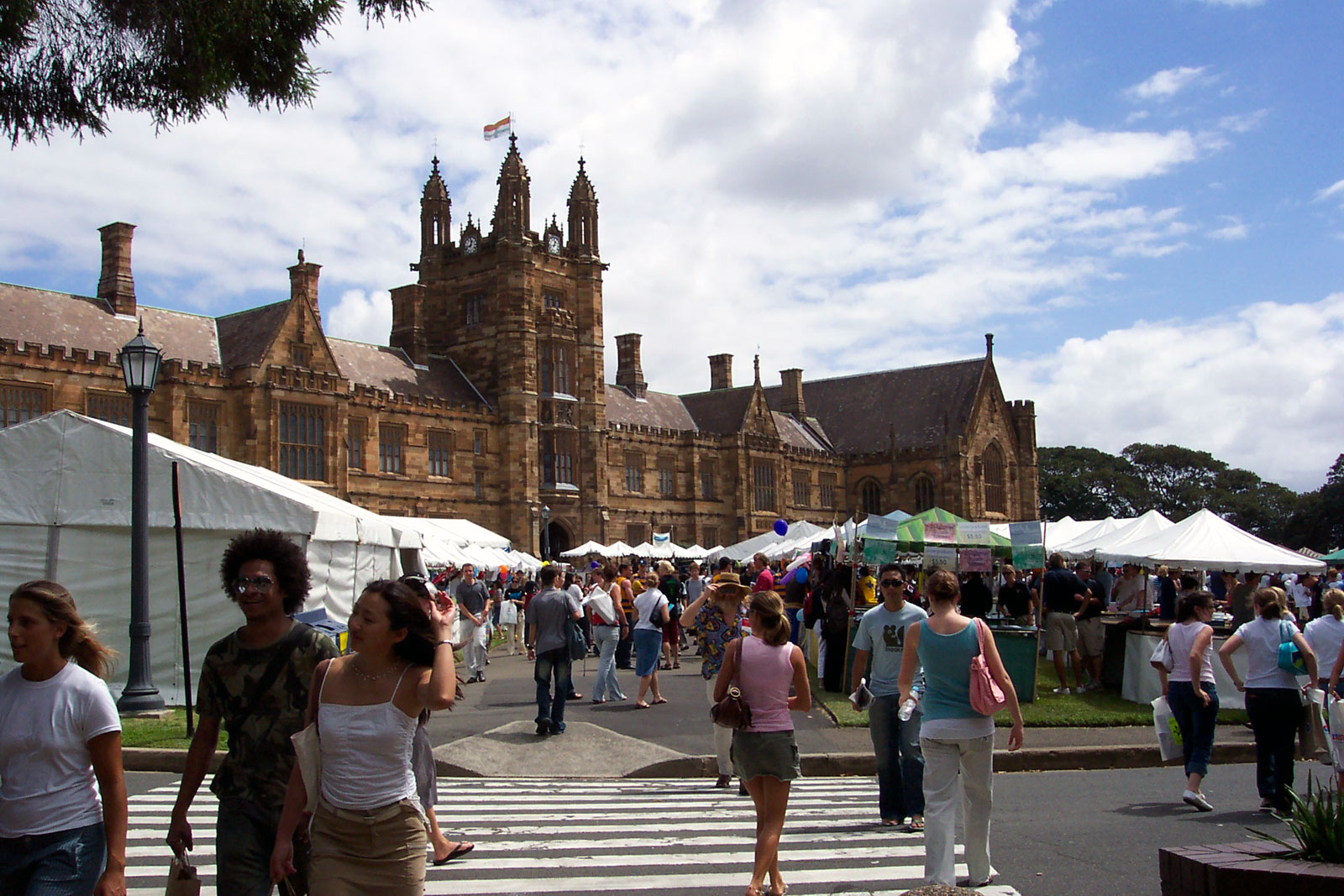
Welcome Week

- Student Representatives: Politically and academically, undergraduate students are represented by the University of Sydney Students' Representative Council (SRC) and postgraduate students by the Sydney University Postgraduate Representative Association (SUPRA).
- University of Sydney Union: The University of Sydney Union (USU) is the oldest and largest university union in Australia. USU provides a range of activities, programs, services and facilities geared at giving students the university experience. This involves delivering clubs and societies program, a varied entertainment program, student opportunities, a range of catering and retail services plus buildings and recreational spaces for students, staff and visitors.

The SRC and Union are both governed by student representatives, who are elected by students each year. Elections for the USU board of directors occur in first semester; elections for the SRC president, and for members of the Students' Representative Council itself, occur in second semester, along with a separate election for the editorial board of the student newspaper Honi Soit, which is published by the SRC.

=== Charles Perkins Oration and Prize ===
Since 2000, the Dr Charles Perkins Oration has been held by the university, in honour of its first Aboriginal graduate, Charlie Perkins. The orations have been delivered by prominent First Nations people, including Linda Burney, Pat Anderson, Daniel Browning, Mick Gooda and Ken Wyatt.

The Oration includes the Charles Perkins Memorial Prize, which recognises the achievements of the top three Indigenous students at the university, based on the highest academic results in their field.

In 2021, the awards event could not be held in the great hall, owing to the COVID-19 pandemic in Australia, but Perkins' daughter, filmmaker Rachel Perkins, announced the recipients, and introduced Tony McAvoy, Australia's first Indigenous Queen's Counsel, to deliver the oration.

=== Revues ===
The University of Sydney plays host to a wide variety of comedy revues each year, each typically tied to a faculty or identity group. Each revue features comedy sketches, songs and videos written and performed by students, usually commenting satirically on current affairs, the supporting faculty and general student life. Most of the revues are performed in the Seymour Centre on the university's Darlington campus. The revues are supported financially and administratively by the University of Sydney Union (USU) and presented in collective "seasons". The Revues range in budget and cast size, with the Faculty Revues using larger venues, and higher budgets as a result of Faculty funding. Past revuers have gone on to perform, write and produce shows in other festivals, such as the Edinburgh Festival Fringe, the New York International Fringe Festival, and the Melbourne International Comedy Festival, as well as in comedy shows such as The Chaser, The Aunty Jack Show, The Ronnie Johns Half Hour, and The Axis of Awesome.

== Notable people ==
=== Notable alumni ===
University of Sydney alumni have made significant contributions to both Australia and the world for the past 176 years.

Notable alumni of Sydney include eight prime ministers, the most of any university, five chief justices of the High Court, four federal opposition leaders, two governors-general, nine federal attorneys-general, 13 premiers of New South Wales and 26 justices of the High Court—more than any other law school in Australia. The faculty has also produced 24 Rhodes Scholars and several Gates Scholars. Internationally, alumni of Sydney Law School include the third president of the United Nations General Assembly and a president of the International Court of Justice (in each case, the only Australians to date to hold such positions).

The University of Sydney is associated with five Nobel laureates: in chemistry John Cornforth (alumnus; the only Nobel Laureate born in New South Wales) and Robert Robinson (staff); in economics, John Harsanyi (alumnus); and in physiology or medicine, John Eccles and Bernard Katz (both staff).

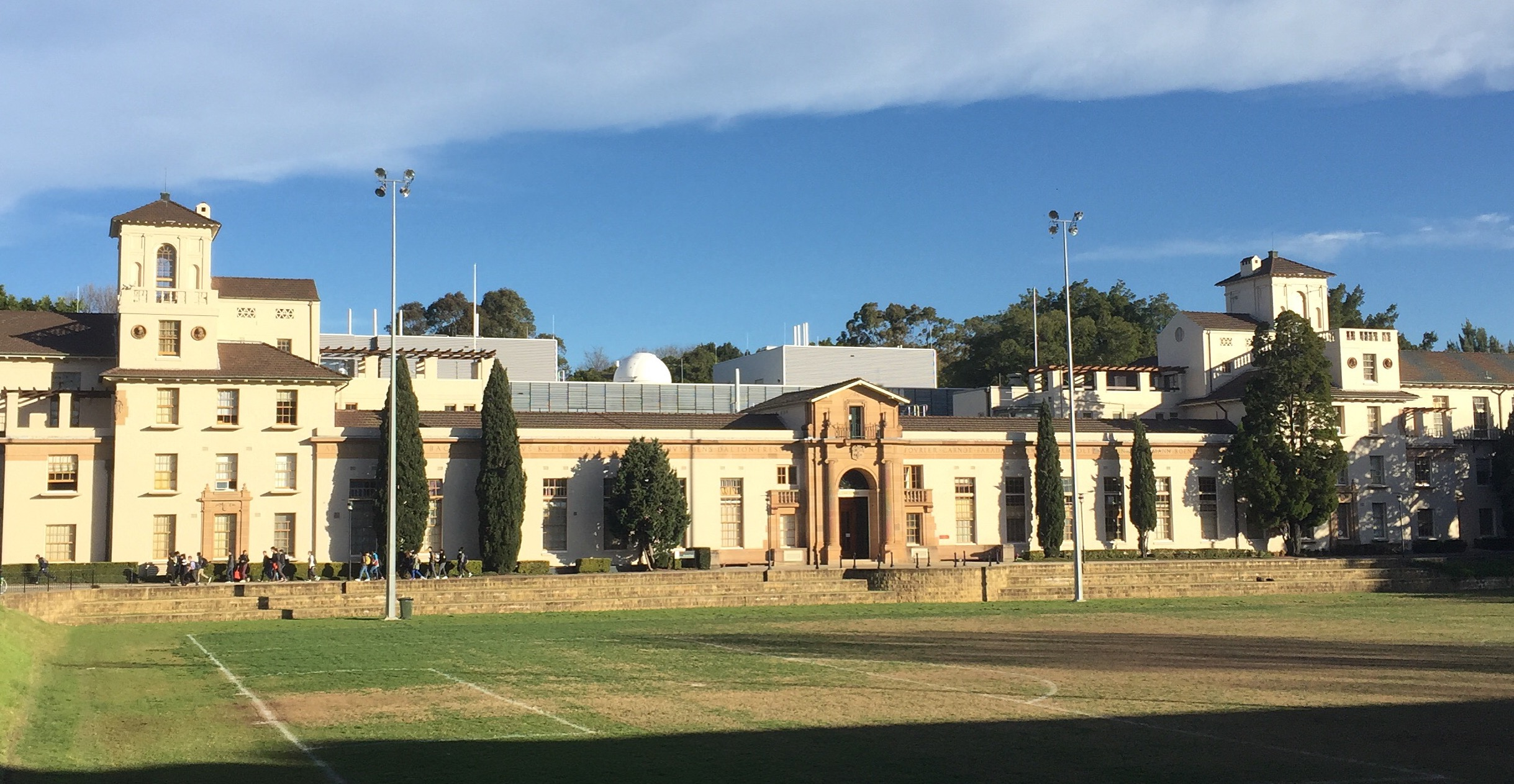
The School of Physics

The School of Physics has played an important role in the development of radio astronomy in particular: Ruby Payne-Scott conducted the first interferometric observations in radio astronomy with the sea-cliff interferometer at Dover Heights; alumnus Ron Bracewell proposed the nulling interferometer to image extrasolar planets, made contributions to the theory of the Fourier Transform and X-ray tomography, and proposed the idea of the Bracewell probe in SETI; and alumnus Bernard Mills led the construction of the Mills Cross Telescope and Molonglo Observatory Synthesis Telescope in the ACT. School of Physics alumnus and Crafoord Laureate Edwin Salpeter discovered the form of the initial mass function of stars, the importance of beryllium-8 in stellar nuclear fusion, and independently with Yakov Zel'dovich proposed the black hole accretion disk model of active galactic nuclei. The Apollo 14 Mission Scientist Philip K. Chapman and the first Australian-born astronaut to fly in space Paul Scully-Power are both alumni of the university. Chaos theory pioneer and Crafoord Laureate Robert May is an alumnus of and former professor at the School of Physics, best known for his exploration of the logistic map bifurcations. The first Australian citizen in space and recipient of the Advance Global Australian of the Year Award 2014, Chris Boshuizen attended the school receiving his PhD in 2005.

In the performing arts, notable alumni include soprano Joan Sutherland; Shakespearean actor John Bell, producer and director Dolph Lundgren; and Bahraini–Sri Lankan actress Jacqueline Fernandez. In international politics, notable alumni include former chief minister of Uttar Pradesh, Akhilesh Yadav and premier of British Columbia, John Horgan. In community activism, notable alumni include Aboriginal activist Charlie Perkins; feminists Eva Cox and Germaine Greer.

== Controversies ==
=== Sexual harassment ===
A quarter of the university's female students residing in university's residential colleges have been found to face sexual harassment. Between 2011 and 2016, there were 52 officially reported cases of sexual abuse and harassment on campus released by the university, resulting in one expulsion, one suspension and four reprimands. This is less than the 2017 Australian Human Rights Commission report on sexual assault and harassment which found reported figures substantially higher than this. 71% of students surveyed in 2017 reported not knowing how to make a report relating to sexual assault or harassment. Imogen Grant from the SRC said students who had experienced sexual assault had come forward believing that "navigating the university bureaucracy exacerbates trauma and often seems futile". Previously a 2015 survey of 2,000 students found that 57 per cent of respondents did not know where to seek help or how to report sexual misconduct at USYD, and only 1.4% of all serious sexual incidents are reported. After the release of the 2017 report the vice-chancellor said the university was committed to implementing "all of the recommendations contained in the report". Graphic videos emerged in 2018 of male students bragging of their sexual feats over the female students, particularly first-years.

=== Staff underpayment ===
In 2015, staff passed a motion of no confidence in Spence because of concerns he was pushing staff to improve the budget while he received a performance bonus of $155,000 that took his total pay to $1 million, in the top 0.1 per cent of income earners in Australia. Fairfax reported Spence and other Uni bosses have salary packages worth ten times more than staff salaries and double that of the Prime Minister.

In 2020, the University of Sydney revealed it had been underpaying staff and was reviewing six years worth of payroll shortfalls. In 2021, it announced that it had underpaid staff a total of $12.75 million to 12,894 staff members. In October 2021, 80 casual staff members made a $2 million wage theft claim for paying for each assignment marked instead of by the hour, underpayment for teaching preparation, lecture attendance, student consultation and other teaching duties, as well as misclassifying marking work at a level that attracts a lower pay.

=== Environmental litter ===
In April 2022, the Land and Environment Court of New South Wales fined the University of Sydney $61,000 for disposing a broken positron emission tomography scanner with a radioactive source inside at a scrap metal yard.

=== Insufficient seating ===
Students in 2025 have been forced to sit on the floor because of excessive enrolments. Students have been forced to fight for seating including one case where a tutorial had over 40 people. This made it impossible to fully participate in tutorials which count for 10% of marks.

=== Satisfaction rating ===
In 2025 the University of Sydney had the 2nd worst student satisfaction rating across every university in Australia.

=== Cyberattack ===
In late 2025, there was a major cyberattack in the university where hackers accessed personal information of thousands of students and university staff. The university spokesman confirmed approximately 20,000 university staff, past and present, were affected.

== See also ==
- Frontiers of Science (1962–87)
- Jacaranda (University of Sydney)
- List of universities in Australia
- NICTA – National Information and Communication Technology Research Centre, co-supported by University of Sydney
- Power Institute of Fine Arts
- Stanford University
- IIT
