= Cranbrook School =

Cranbrook School may mean:

- Cranbrook Schools, an independent, co-educational, day and boarding school in Bloomfield Hills, Michigan, United States. It is part of the Cranbrook Educational Community
- Cranbrook School, Ilford, a co-educational independent school in Greater London, England
- Cranbrook School, Kent, is a voluntary aided non-denominational boarding and day co-educational grammar school in Kent, England
- Cranbrook School, Sydney is an independent, K-12 day and boarding school in Sydney, Australia

== See also ==
Cranbrook (disambiguation)
