= Cranbrook =

Cranbrook may refer to:

== People ==
- Earl of Cranbrook, a title in the Peerage of the United Kingdom
  - Gathorne Gathorne-Hardy, 1st Earl of Cranbrook (1814–1906), British Conservative politician
  - John Stewart Gathorne-Hardy, 2nd Earl of Cranbrook (1839–1911), Conservative Member of Parliament

== Places ==
=== Australia ===
- Cranbrook, Bellevue Hill, historic residence in Sydney
- Cranbrook, Camperdown, Sydney
- Cranbrook, Queensland, a suburb of Townsville
- Cranbrook, Tasmania, in Glamorgan Land District
- Cranbrook, Western Australia
- Shire of Cranbrook, Western Australia

=== Canada ===
- Cranbrook, British Columbia, a city
  - Cranbrook Memorial Arena
- Cranbrook (electoral district), existing from 1903 to 1963
- Cranbrook/Canadian Rockies International Airport
- Cranbrook, Ontario, a pre-Confederation settlement near Listowel

=== England ===
- Cranbrook Castle, an Iron Age Hill fort in Devon
- Cranbrook, Devon, a new town in East Devon
  - Cranbrook railway station, Devon
- Cranbrook, Kent
  - Cranbrook Colony, a group of artists active from 1853 onwards
  - Cranbrook School, Kent
  - Cranbrook (Kent) railway station
- Cranbrook, London, a district in the London Borough of Redbridge
- Cranbrook Estate, a housing estate in East London

== Educational facilities ==
- Cranbrook Educational Community, an education, research and museum complex in Bloomfield Hills, Michigan, USA
  - Cranbrook Schools
- Cranbrook School, Ilford, England
- Cranbrook School, Kent, England
- Cranbrook School, Sydney, Australia
- Cranbrook Elementary School, Columbus, Ohio, USA

== Other uses ==
- Plymouth Cranbrook, an automobile produced from 1951 to 1953
- "Cranbrook" (hymn tune)
