= Admission Block, Royal Prince Alfred Hospital =

- Location within Sydney Location within Australia
- 33.8895°S 151.1826°E
- Location: Missenden Road, Camperdown, City of Sydney, New South Wales, Australia

History
- Built: 1876–1882

Site notes
- Architect: Mansfield Brothers
- Owner: NSW Department of Health

New South Wales Heritage Register
- Official name: Royal Prince Alfred Hospital - Admission Block; RPA
- Type: state heritage (built)
- Designated: 2 April 1999
- Reference no.: 830
- Type: Hospital
- Category: Health Services

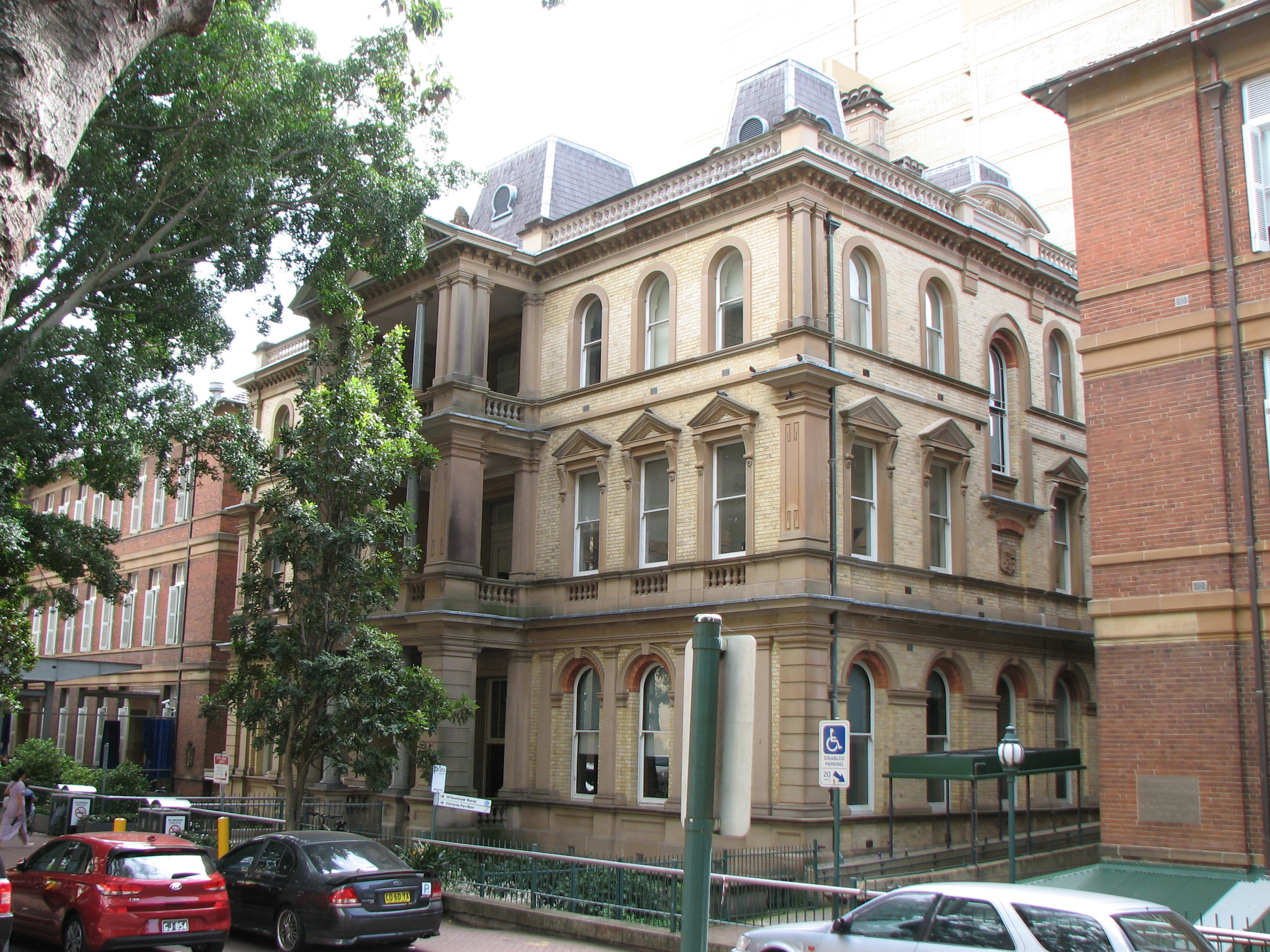
RPA Hospital-Administration Building

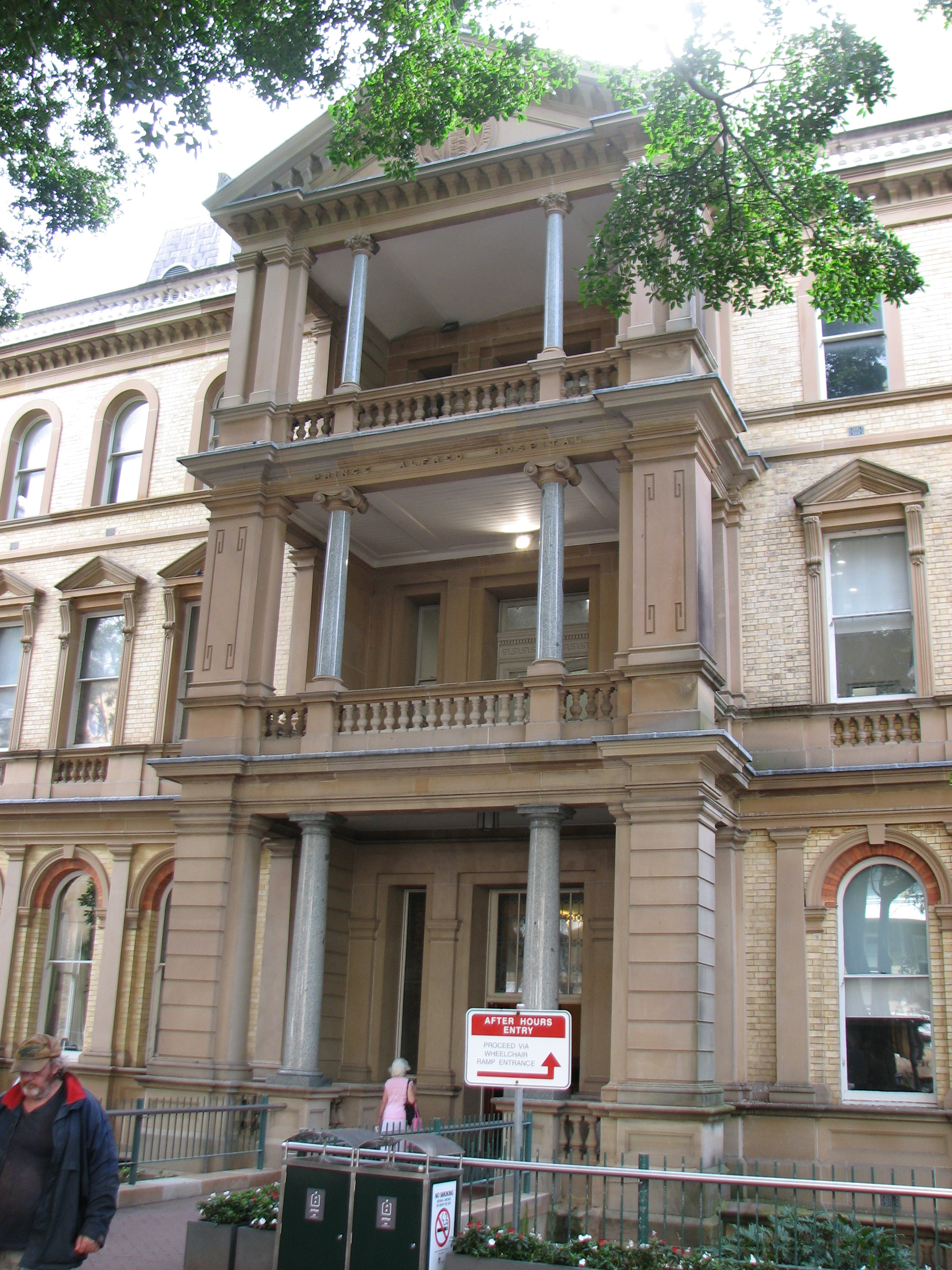
RPA Hospital-Administration Building Entrance

The Admission Block, or Administration Building, is a heritage-listed hospital building within the Royal Prince Alfred Hospital at Missenden Road, Camperdown, New South Wales, Australia. It was designed by George Allen Mansfield of Mansfield Brothers and built from 1876 to 1882. It was added to the New South Wales State Heritage Register on 2 April 1999.

== History ==
A public meeting in Sydney on 20 March 1868 resolved to build a new hospital to commemorate the recovery of Alfred, Duke of Saxe-Coburg and Gotha, following his attempted assassination by Henry O'Farrell at Clontarf on 12 March. The Parliament of New South Wales passed an Act to incorporate Prince Alfred Hospital on 3 April 1873 and appointed Mansfield Brothers as architects. The first building erected was a cottage, later the gardener's cottage, near the southern entrance from Missenden Road.

Construction started on the Administration Building and C and D Pavilions in 1876. The gardens were established at this time with assistance from the staff of the Botanical Gardens.

The Hospital was opened in 1882. On opening, the Royal Prince Alfred Hospital cost 495 pounds per bed, compared to the Sydney Hospital's 379 pounds per bed.

The rear wing was removed c. 1980. The major public spaces were redecorated c. 1986 as part of the alterations made in building E block; the architects for this work were McConnell, Smith and Johnson P/L.

== Description ==
The entrance is located on a central axis. Originally the plan was "H" pattern. The eastern position of the building was demolished to construct the Duke of Edinburgh building, leaving only the front part of the block together with the central hall extending into the newer building.

The building is Victorian Free Classical in style, built symmetrically about a three-storey portico. Built with a cream brick façade and sandstone embellishments, with red bricks emphasising the ground floor arched openings. The entrance portico has grey granite columns. The roof covering was originally slate but was replaced by glazed terracotta tiling. The original slated roof with four ventilated turrets was restored to the building c. 2012, along with extensive stone restoration to the exterior cornices, chimneys and stone fencing fronting Missenden Road.

Within the ground floor is a vast lobby, with marble tiled flooring, elaborate plaster work to both walls and ceiling, including hand-run cornices enriched with modillions, and several very fine leaded stained glass windows, depicting the Royal Coat of Arms, Queen Victoria, Caritas etc. The rear of the lobby has a pressed metal ceiling and a "Lyncrusta" Art Nouveau dado. The southern side hall has a floor of fine Victorian tessellated ceramic tiles, probably the whole lobby floor was originally to this pattern. Early pendant metal and glass electrified light fixtures were removed to storage c. 2010, making way for a modern rail fixture to better light the area.

== Heritage listing ==
The Administration Block, both internally and externally, is an item of exceptional significance. It is a major surviving item of the original hospital; the historic core that has been in continuous use. The building is a fine example of the work of George Allen Mansfield, first president of the Institute of Architects. The three surviving facades and roof form are a finely detailed example of Victorian architecture. Together with the Victoria & Albert Pavilions, the group has an important landmark quality as one of the most imposing facades in Sydney.

Admission Block, Royal Prince Alfred Hospital was listed on the New South Wales State Heritage Register on 2 April 1999 having satisfied the following criteria.

The place is important in demonstrating the course, or pattern, of cultural or natural history in New South Wales.

The hospital was established as a charity hospital, with the beds being funded by subscribers. The colonial government, as a major subscriber, was entitled to issue tickets of admission as were the individual subscribers or "bed donors". Subscription to charity institutions such as the hospital was seen as being prestigious and lists of subscribers were published regularly. In later buildings, such as King George V Hospital plaques recorded the donors names.

The hospital was intended to care for the poor, who could not afford medical care in their own homes. In order to help develop an ethic of "self-help" amongst the working classes all patients were encouraged to pay an appropriate level of fee.

The hospital admitted private patients from the start, particularly those who did not have friends or relatives living in Sydney. Additional private facilities were provided in the late 1930s with the construction of Gloucester House.

The system of tickets of admissions to hospitals gradually vanished, with the majority of the funding now being provided by the government rather than by public subscription. From the 1920s onwards people were being admitted to hospital who previously would have been cared for at home. This care was particularly evident in the case of maternity care.

The place is important in demonstrating aesthetic characteristics and/or a high degree of creative or technical achievement in New South Wales.

The survival of historical artefacts and records in both the hospital and the medical school gives the potential for future research on the types of patients and illnesses, nursing and hospital practice, the development of the hospital and on medical and nursing training. There is also information related to particular individuals.

The original hospital buildings were designed according to the latest known techniques, and include the use of steel beams with small span concrete or corrugated iron vaulting between. The technique was designed not only to be fireproof but would also provide a medium that would not permit the transmission disease. More recent buildings have been constructed using similar materials with a similar aim.

In addition the layout was designed to provide for the movement of patients around the hospital, on trolleys before the widespread use of lifts. The movement of patients in the open air was obviously considered appropriate when the hospital was constructed however enclosed walkways have subsequently been constructed to link areas of the hospital.

Some of the surviving features of the various buildings demonstrate technical developments in medical care and technology. Some features are part of the design, others are part of the equipment and services. These features, when known, are identified in the inventory but more work remains to be done in this area. Additional features are likely to be discovered during building works.

The place has a strong or special association with a particular community or cultural group in New South Wales for social, cultural or spiritual reasons.

The hospital continues to be held in high regard by the community, by the staff and by the patients. It has a high reputation for the quality of medical care generally and for its specialised medical and research facilities.

Hospitals are places of major events in the lives of individuals in the community, births, serious illnesses, accidents and deaths. Individuals and families have strong feelings and associations with the place as the site of these major events in their lives. Generations of NSW residents, in particular Sydneysiders have memories of Royal Prince Alfred Hospital.

The staff, both the doctors and the nurses have strong associations with the place, particularly because of the length of time many spent within the institution as a student. As a major teaching hospital it has a strong impact on many nurses and doctors practicing today.

The expansion of the hospital to the south created community opposition, particularly to the demolition of residences. This opposition has subsided in recent years now that the major phase of demolition has been completed, but there is still some concern regarding the impact of the hospital on the community, particularly regarding parking issues.

== See also ==
- Victoria & Albert Pavilions, Royal Prince Alfred Hospital

 New South Wales portal
