= Ian Greer =

British political lobbyist affected by the cash-for-questions affair (1933–2015)

- Born: Ian Bramwell Greer; 5 June 1933
- Died: 4 November 2015 (aged 82)
- Occupation: Political lobbyist
- Spouse: Clive Ferreira (m. 2013)

Ian Bramwell Greer (5 June 1933 – 4 November 2015) was a British political lobbyist whose career was affected by the cash-for-questions affair.

== Early life ==
Ian Bramwell Greer was born on 5 June 1933, the son of Salvation Army parents. He was educated at Cranbrook College, Essex, and Victoria School, Glasgow.

At the age of 24, Greer began working for the Conservative Central Office and became the party's youngest ever area agent at that time. In 1966, Greer left the Conservative Central Office in order to run the Mental Health Trust. In that capacity, Greer developed an initial list of political contacts in order to campaign for better conditions for those suffering from mental illness.

== Consultancy ==
In 1970, Greer established a consultancy with John Russell. The partnership split after 10 years, with Greer going on to establish his own consultancy in 1982. According to Andy McSmith of The Independent in his obituary of Greer, "part of the reason for the bust-up was Greer's keenness to take up American-style lobbying, which was more open and sharp-elbowed than the old boy networks that ran Britain's lobbying industry." By the mid-1980s, clients of Ian Greer Associates included Plessey, the Argyll Group, Johnson and Matthey, the National Nuclear Corporation, and the House of Fraser.

Following a report by the Civil Aviation Authority which criticised British Airways' near monopoly of air routes, British Airways chairman Lord King was introduced to Ian Greer by Conservative MP Michael Grylls, Grylls held a private meeting with Lord King, recommending that British Airways hire Ian Greer Associates in an account which was worth more than £100,000 to the firm.

Although the majority of Greer's political contacts were members of the Conservative Party, some also belonged to the Labour Party. In the early 1980s, Greer paid Walter Johnson, Labour MP for Derby South, to campaign to retain lead in petrol.

== Cash-for-questions affair ==
In October 1994, The Guardian newspaper alleged that Greer had bribed two Conservative Members of Parliament in exchange for asking questions in parliament, and other tasks, on behalf of the Egyptian owner of Harrods department store, Mohamed Al-Fayed. The politicians in question were Neil Hamilton and Tim Smith, Members of Parliament for Tatton and Beaconsfield, respectively. The political scandal would be named the "cash-for-questions affair".

Greer began legal action against The Guardian with Neil Hamilton, but the co-plaintiffs withdrew in 1996, citing a conflict of interest. Ian Greer Associates went into liquidation and Greer moved to South Africa.

== Later life and death ==
While in South Africa, Greer established a soup kitchen to feed homeless children.

In 2013, he returned to London due to the political situation in South Africa, and married his partner Clive Ferreira. Greer eventually settled in Church Street, Leominster.

On 4 November 2015, Greer fell in the car park of the Morrisons store in Leominster, having gone shopping with his partner Clive Ferreira. Greer was conscious at first, but eventually lost consciousness. An ambulance was called, although Greer was pronounced dead shortly after his arrival at Hereford County Hospital.

An inquest into his death was held at Hereford Town Hall in March 2016. County coroner Mark Bricknell ruled Greer's cause of death as being the result of an acute subdural haemorrhage with a skull fracture, recording a verdict that his death was accidental.
