= Royal Prince Alfred Hospital =

Coordinates: 33°53′21″S 151°10′58″E

- Sydney Local Health District

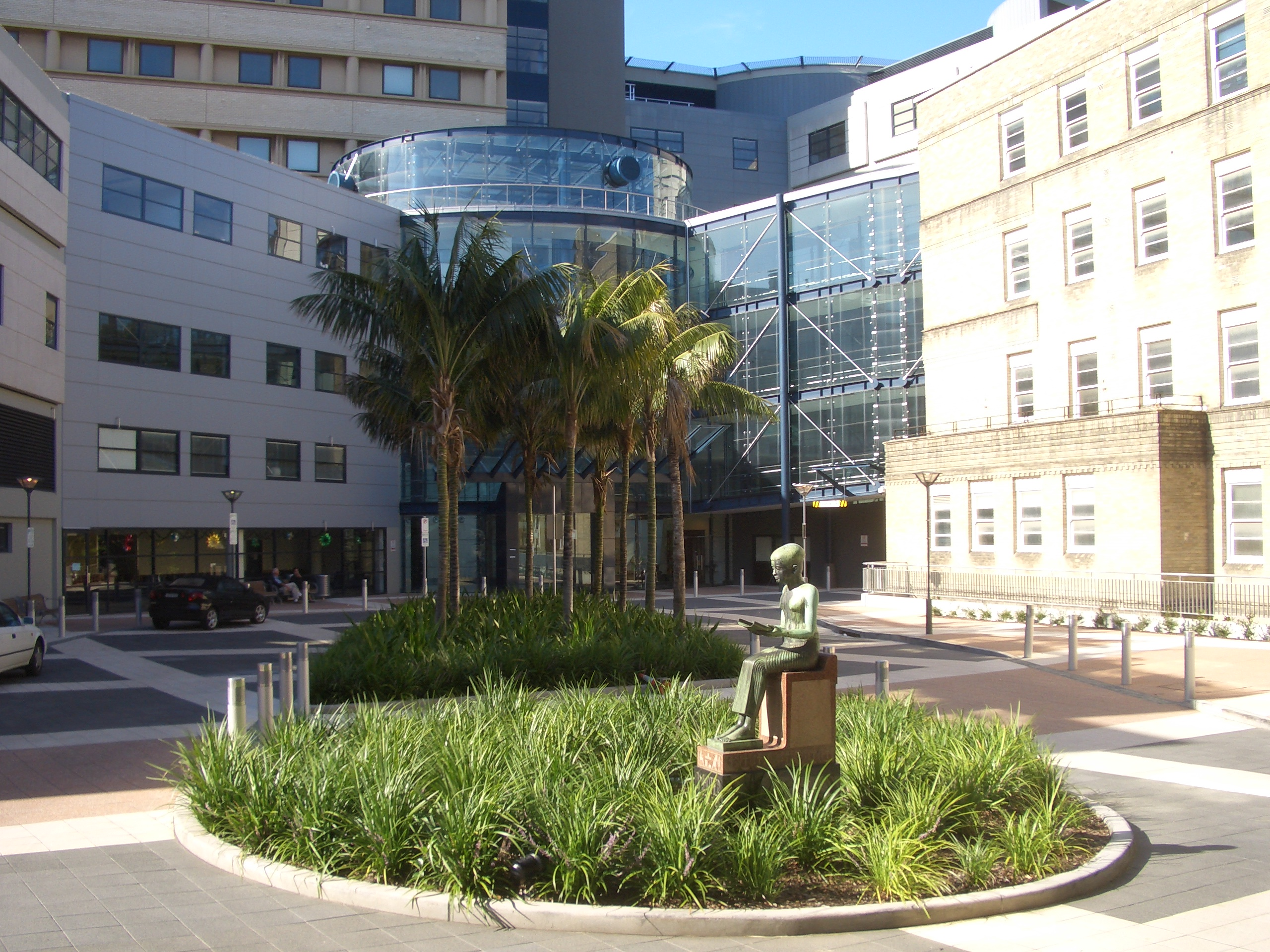
- Royal Prince Alfred Hospital

Geography
- Location: Camperdown, Sydney, Australia

Organisation
- Care system: Public Medicare (AU)
- Type: Teaching, District General
- Affiliated university: University of Sydney

Services
- Emergency department: Yes
- Beds: 1200

Helipads
- Helipad: (ICAO: YRPA)
Number	Length		Surface
Number	ft	m	Surface
1			concrete

History
- Founded: 1871; 155 years ago

Links
- Website: slhd.nsw.gov.au/rpa/
- Lists: Hospitals in Australia

The Royal Prince Alfred Hospital (abbreviated RPAH or RPA) is a large teaching hospital in Sydney, Australia, located on Missenden Road in Camperdown. It is a teaching hospital of the Central Clinical School of the Sydney Medical School at the University of Sydney and is situated in proximity to the Blackburn Building of the university's main campus. RPAH is the largest hospital in the Sydney Local Health District, with approximately 1200 beds. Following a $350 million redevelopment, the perinatal hospital King George V Memorial Hospital has been incorporated into it.

An Australian television documentary, RPA, was filmed there from 1995 to 2012, depicting the everyday workings of a major metropolitan hospital.

== History ==
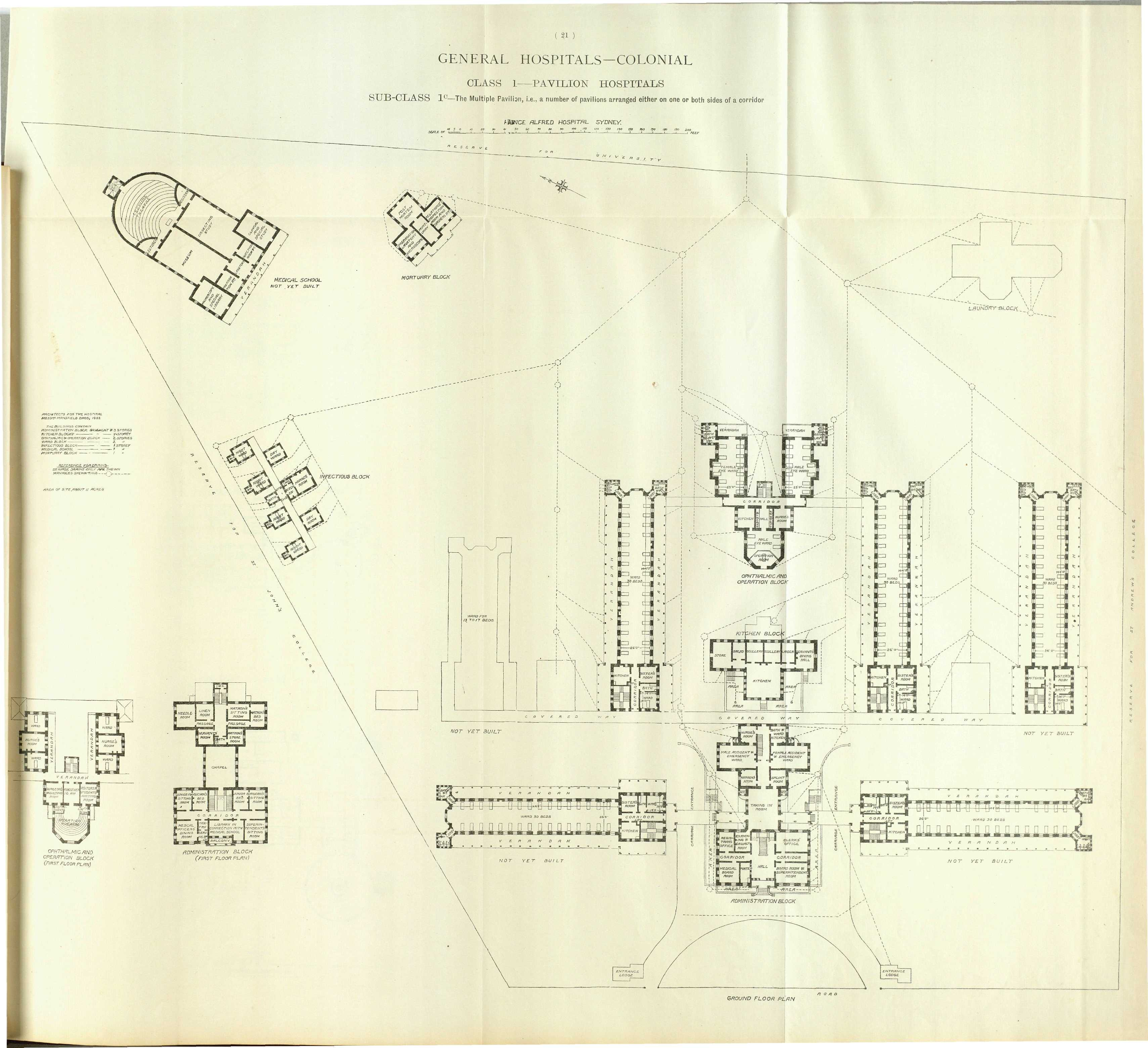
Floor plan in 1893

Royal Prince Alfred is one of the oldest hospitals in New South Wales. The funds were raised by public subscription, to make a monument to commemorate the recovery of Prince Alfred, Duke of Edinburgh from an assassination attempt in 1868 by Henry James O'Farrell. Thomas Holt was founder and director of the hospital from 1873 to 1883. This new hospital was originally proposed to be built in Macquarie Street, to incorporate the Sydney Infirmary. However, the Board of that institution rejected this proposal.

On 3 April 1873 Parliament passed an Act to incorporate Prince Alfred Hospital. Mansfield Brothers were appointed as architects to design the buildings. The first building erected was a cottage, near the southern entrance from Missenden Road, which later became the gardener's cottage. Construction started on the Administration Building and C and D Pavilions in 1876, at which time gardens were also established, with assistance from the staff of the Botanical Gardens. The Administration Building is Victorian Free Classical in style, built symmetrically about a three-storied portico. It boasts a cream brick façade and sandstone embellishments, with red bricks emphasising the ground floor arched openings. The entrance portico has grey granite columns. Since 2015, the roof covering has been restored to the original slate with ornate ventilators. All weathered areas of stone cornicing and enrichments were also replaced. The hospital was opened in 1882.

Both the Victoria and the Albert Pavilion are three-storied Federation Free Classical style red brick buildings. The original pavilions were constructed to commemorate the royal visit of Prince Alfred. The foundation stone was laid in 1901 and the buildings were completed in 1904. Both pavilions have handsome elevations, dominated by a projecting bay surmounted by a pediment bearing copper clad statues of Queen Victoria (southern pavilion) and Prince Albert (northern pavilion). The Queen Victoria Pavilion was extended in relatively sympathetic manner by the construction of the Fairfax Institute of Pathology in 1943. The buildings were designed by Walter Liberty Vernon.

The Admission Block and the Victoria & Albert Pavilions are listed on the New South Wales Heritage Register.

=== Teaching ===
It was only two years after its opening in 1882 that the hospital accepted its first medical students from the Medical School of the University of Sydney. Since then, the hospital has benefited from this close relationship at the teaching, research and clinical levels. For example, it is the only public hospital in Australia to offer a comprehensive revision course for the RACP written exam for basic physician trainees.

== Clinical services ==
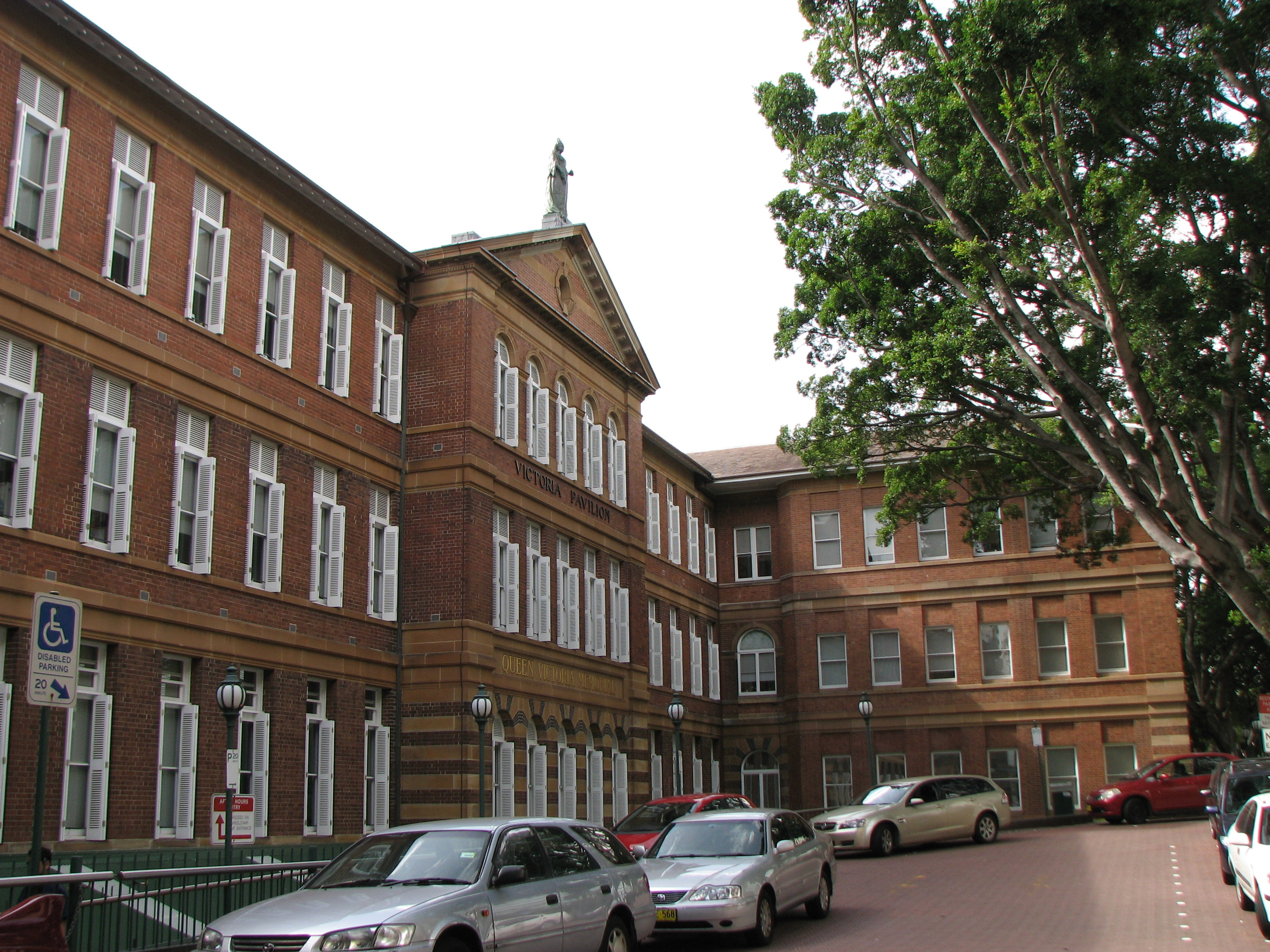
RPA Albert Pavilion

RPA's staff of over 4,000 provides the largest number of in-patient treatments in the state, almost 500,000 out-patient treatments, 45,000 adult and paediatric emergency department patients and delivers 4,000 babies each year. With around 50 percent of all admissions being district services, RPA treats more public patients than any other hospital in the state.

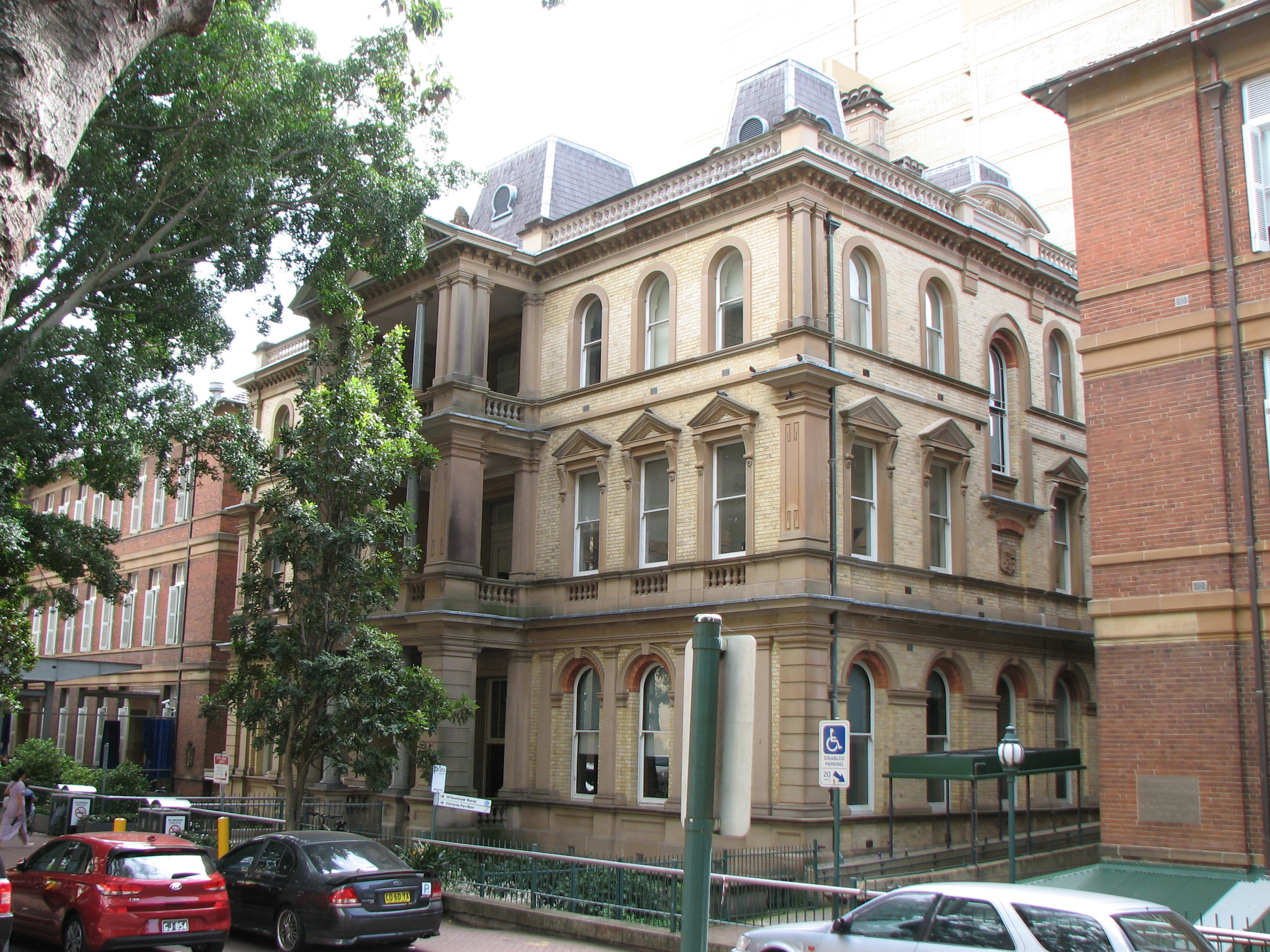
Administration Building

Within RPA itself, four clinical sections provide specialty clinical services: Division of Medicine, Division of Surgery, Division of Obstetrics & Gynaecology and Division of Diagnostic Service. In addition, a range of Allied Health services are also provided, including clinical psychology, psychiatry, health promotion, nutrition and dietetics, orthotics, occupational therapy, physiotherapy, clinical pharmacy, podiatry, speech pathology, social work, genetic counselling and volunteer service.

=== New facilities ===
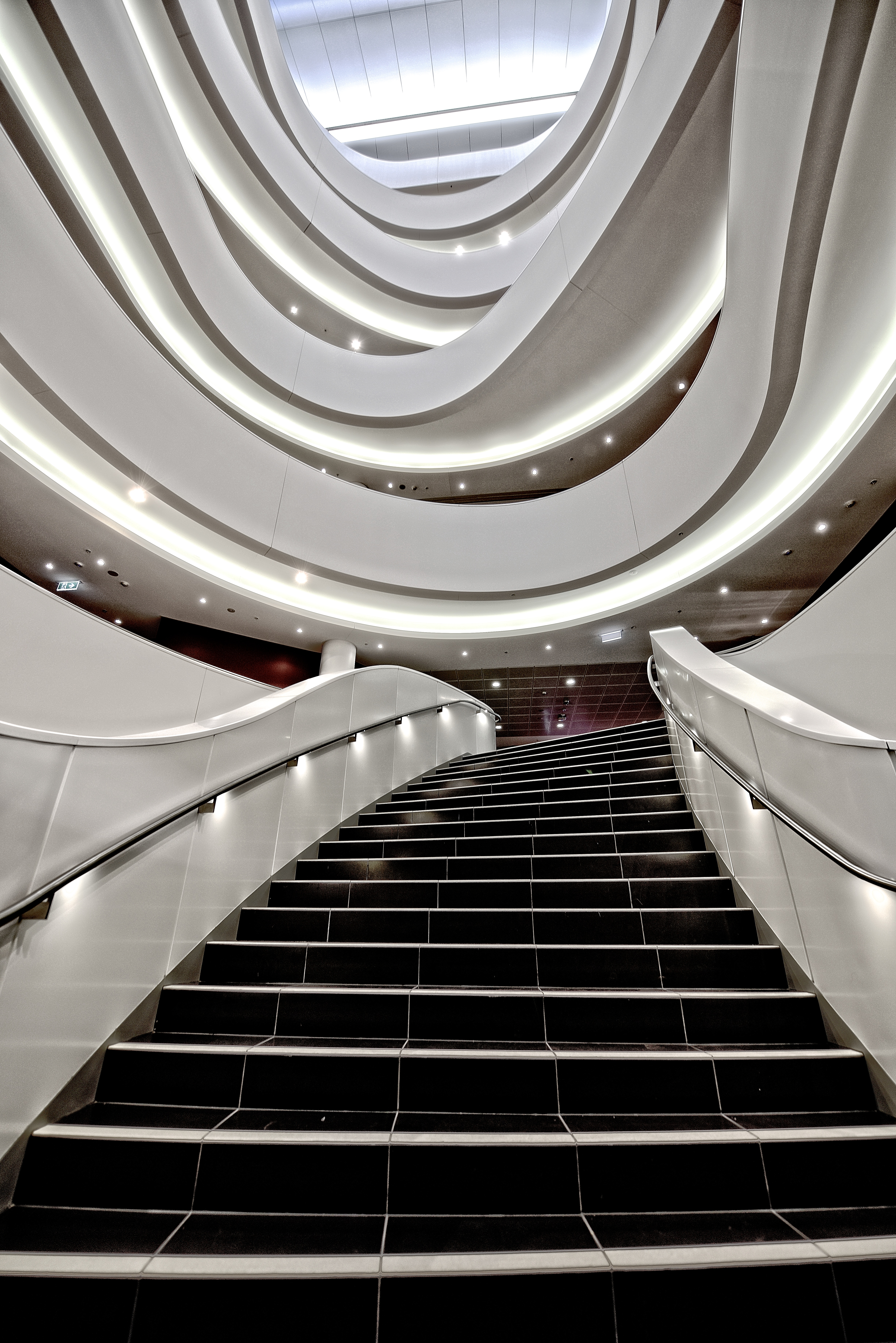
The Charles Perkins Centre for Obesity, Diabetes and Cardiovascular Disease, opened in 2014. It features a whole-body calorimeter, metabolic kitchen, exercise physiology gymnasiums, physical testing facilities, phlebotomy bays, long-term stay beds, wet and dry research labs and more.

RPA has undertaken an extensive program of refurbishment and construction. Public spaces including gardens for patients have been renovated; views of the city, hospital gardens and the University of Sydney. New facilities include the Hot floor, a purpose-built nucleus of critical care services. It brings together operating theatres; intensive care; high dependency units; cardiac intensive care; neuro intensive care; day-stay centre and neonatal intensive care.

Sydney Cancer Centre – The only ambulatory care centre of its type in Australia, combining diagnostic, consultative and follow-up services.

Obstetric and gynaecological services – A birthing unit with nine delivery rooms, three home-like birthing rooms and 32 neonatal cots.

Diagnostic services – Facilities include positron emission tomography; X-ray/digital scanner rooms; computerised axial tomography scanners; ultrasound room; magnetic resonance imaging (MRI); and angiography rooms.

Institute of Rheumatology and Orthopaedics – 60 bed unit covering diagnosis; orthopaedic theatre suite; medical treatment unit; outpatient clinics; rehabilitation; allied health services; hydrotherapy pool and a TGA licensed bone bank.

Day-surgery centre – 38 bed centre containing separate admissions station, operating theatres and recovery area.

NSW Health Pathology – Laboratory services in diagnostic pathology including the NSW porphyrin reference unit. Previously known as the Sydney South West Pathology Service – Eastern Zone and Central Sydney Laboratory Service.

Charles Perkins Centre, dedicated to specialised healthcare and associated clinical research into obesity, diabetes, cardiovascular disease and related areas. Facilities include a whole-body calorimeter, metabolic kitchen, exercise physiology gymnasiums, physical testing facilities, phlebotomy bays, biobank, long-term stay beds, wet and dry research labs and more.

== Research ==
RPA is home to more research institutes and specialist units than any other public hospital in Australia, including:

- Melanoma Unit – the largest in the world
- National Liver Transplant Unit
- Haemophilia Centre – Australia's first major centre in this area
- Sleep Disorders Unit – an Australian first, the unit developed the revolutionary CPAP machine for sleep apnoea sufferers, and pioneered non-invasive ventilation treatment for respiratory failure.
- Sydney Cancer Centre – Australia's largest and most comprehensive cancer treatment centre
- Positron Emission Tomography Camera
- Charles Perkins Centre
- Heart Research Institute
- National Medical Cyclotron
- National Poisons Register
- Sydney Breast Cancer Institute – pioneered breast-sparing surgery in NSW
- Woolcock Institute of Medical Research – Australia's only centre devoted to respiratory and sleep diseases and the leading partner in the national Cooperative Research Centre for asthma.
- RPA Diabetes Centre – a pioneering unit which has developed into the most comprehensive centre for the multidisciplinary clinical care and research for diabetes in Australia. This was recognised by way of the Kellion Award in 2010.
- Rachel Forster Bone Bank – In 1984 RPA orthopaedic surgeons Harry Tyer and Paul Stalley pioneered Australia's first Bone Bank using living donors undergoing elective orthopaedic procedures.

The hospital also sponsors a number of institutes at the University of Sydney, including the Charles Perkins Centre, Heart Research Institute; Centenary Institute for Cancer Medicine and Cell Biology; Kanematsu Memorial Institute of Pathology; and General Endocrinology Group.

== Royal Prince Alfred Hospital School ==
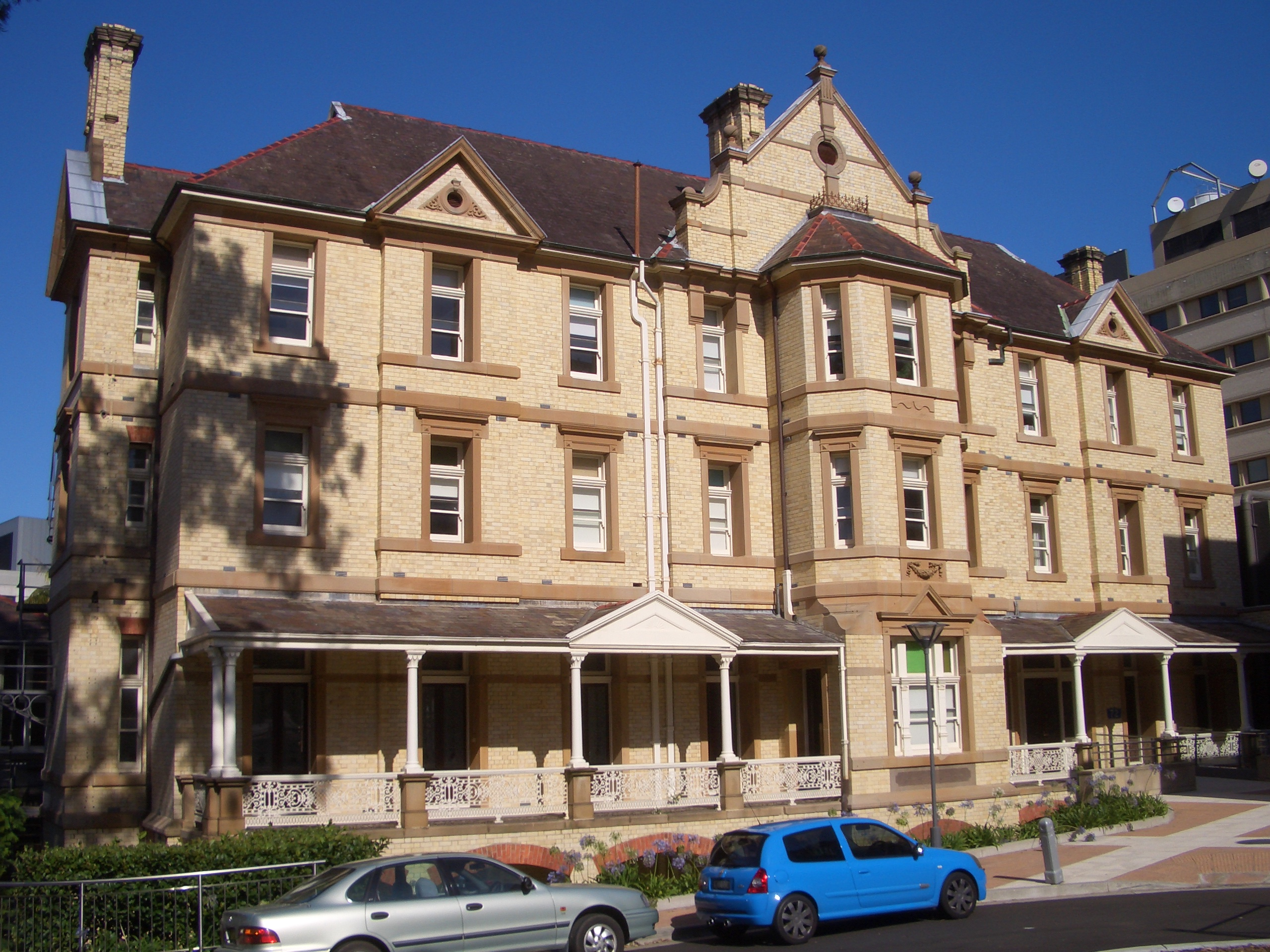
Kerry Packer Education Centre

The Department of Education operates a school within the hospital, known as Royal Prince Alfred Hospital School. Executive, teaching and administrative staffing and funding is provided by the DET in liaison with the hospital's paediatric and nursing units, and may vary according to the changing needs of the school. The school is operated as part of the Botany Bay Network of schools within the Sydney Region.

== Notable staff ==
- Isobelle Mary Ferguson (1926–2019), Aboriginal nurse and activist, undertook the last six months of her training at the hospital in the late 1940s.
- Susan B. McGahey (1862–1919), Matron 1891-1904. She had trained at The London Hospital, Whitechapel, in London, under Eva Luckes between 1884 and 1886. McGahey introduced Nightingale style nursing, organised nurse education and founded the Prince Alfred Hospital Trained Nurses Reunion (alumni association). The then chairman of the Board of Directors, Professor Anderson Stuart refused to allow her to establish a nurse training school, and she resigned in 1904. She was a Foundation Member of the International Council of Nurses, and was president in 1904. She was also one of the founders of the Australasian Trained Nurses Association.
- Frank Mills (1910–2008), cardiac surgeon

== See also ==
- Admission Block, Royal Prince Alfred Hospital
- Victoria & Albert Pavilions, Royal Prince Alfred Hospital
