= Camperdown, New South Wales =

Camperdown
- Suburb
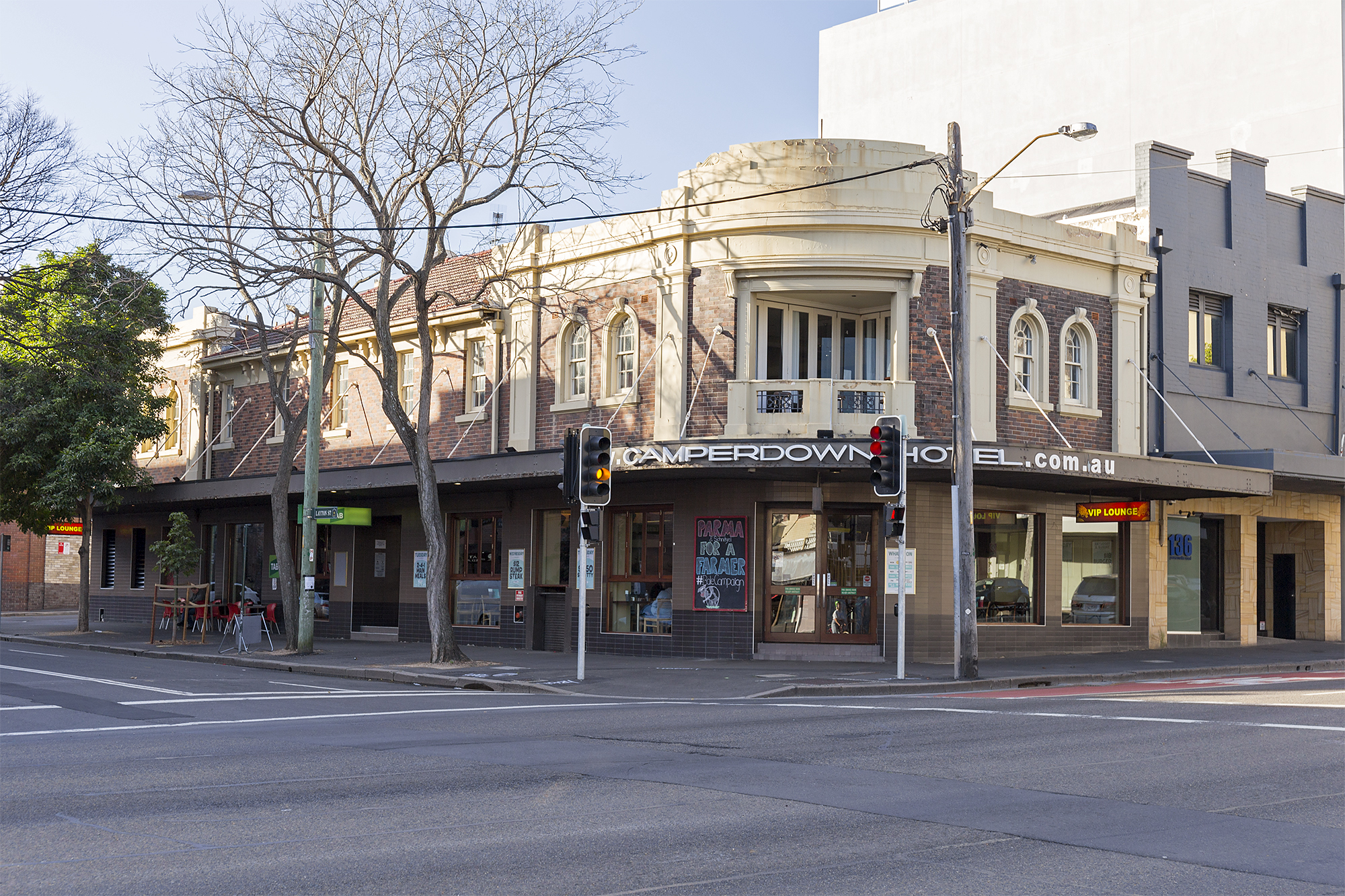
- Camperdown Hotel on the corner of Parramatta Rd and Layton St

- Interactive map of Camperdown
- Country: Australia
- State: New South Wales
- City: Sydney
- LGAs: City of Sydney; Inner West Council
- Location: 4 km (2.5 mi) SW of Sydney CBD

Government
  - State electorates: Balmain; Newtown
  - Federal division: *Grayndler; Sydney

Area
  - Total: 1.5 km^{2} (0.58 sq mi)
- Elevation: 25 m (82 ft)

Population
  - Total: 9,381 (2021 census)
  - Density: 6,250/km^{2} (16,200/sq mi)
- Postcode: 2050
Suburbs around Camperdown
Annandale	Glebe	Chippendale
Stanmore	Camperdown	Darlington
Stanmore	Newtown	Darlington

Camperdown is an inner western suburb of Sydney, in the state of New South Wales, Australia. Camperdown is located 4 kilometres south-west of the Sydney central business district and is part of the Inner West region. Camperdown lies across the local government areas of the City of Sydney and Inner West Council.

Camperdown is a heavily populated suburb and is home to the Royal Prince Alfred Hospital, the University of Sydney and the historic Camperdown Cemetery. It was also once home to the Royal Alexandra Hospital for Children, which was relocated to be next to Westmead Hospital in Sydney's west. The hospital buildings and grounds have been redeveloped into apartment complexes.

== History ==
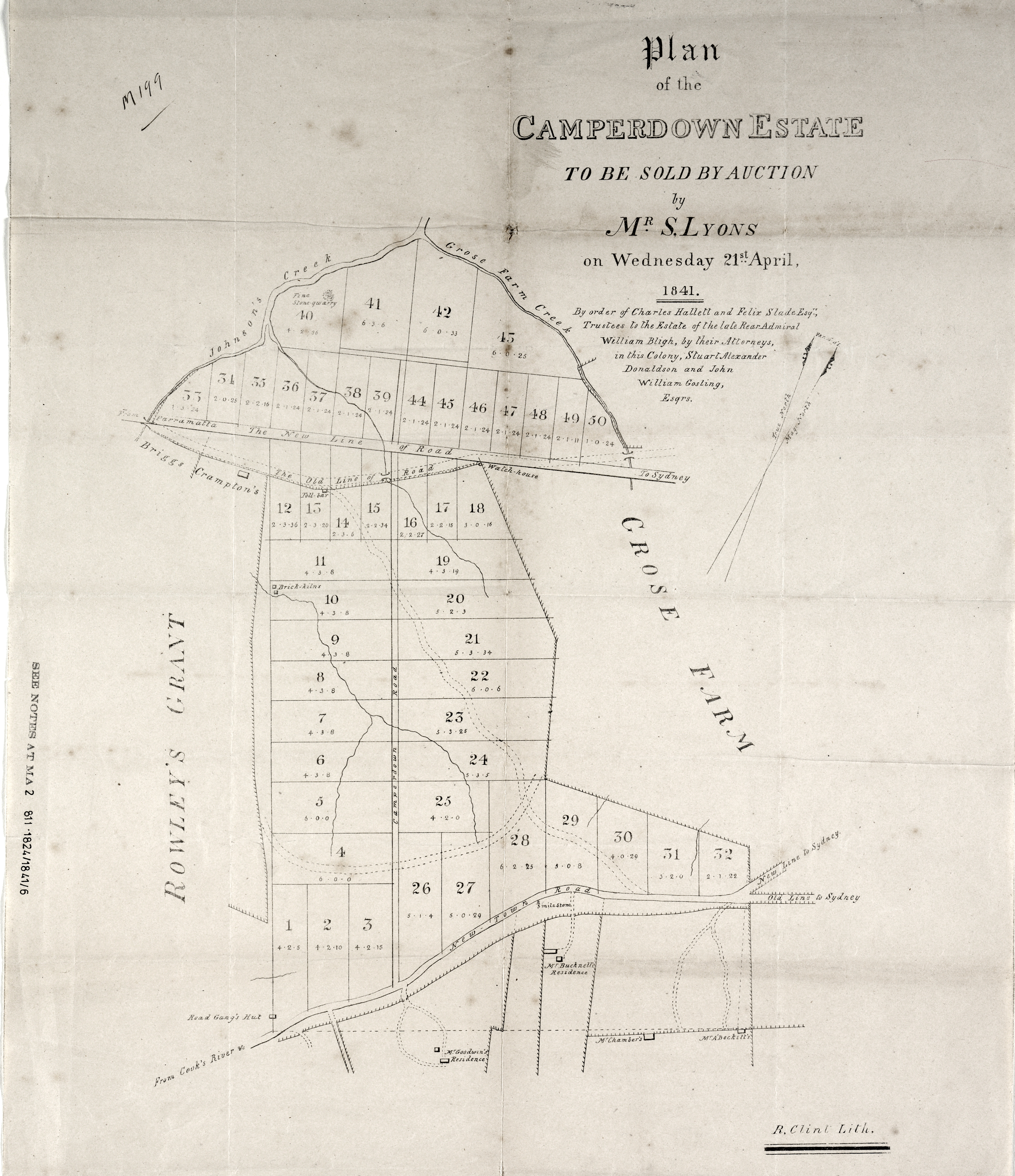
Map of allotments for sale at Camperdown, 1841

Camperdown takes its name from the Battle of Camperdown (or Camperduin in Dutch). It was named by Governor William Bligh who received a grant of 240 acres (1 km^{2}) of land covering present day Camperdown and parts of Newtown. The land passed to Bligh's son-in-law Maurice O'Connell, commander of the 73rd Regiment, later Sir Maurice, when Bligh returned to England. Camperdown was established as a residential and farming area in the early 19th century.

In 1827, a racecourse was opened on land where the Royal Prince Alfred Hospital now stands. The University of Sydney was incorporated in 1850 and its first buildings were designed by Edmund Blacket (1817–1883). In 1859, Blacket's Great Hall was opened at the university.

== Heritage listings ==
Camperdown has a number of heritage-listed sites, including:

- 10, 14 Australia Street: Cranbrook
- Missenden Road: Admission Block, Royal Prince Alfred Hospital
- Missenden Road: Victoria & Albert Pavilions, Royal Prince Alfred Hospital
- Corner of Parramatta and City Roads: Victoria Park
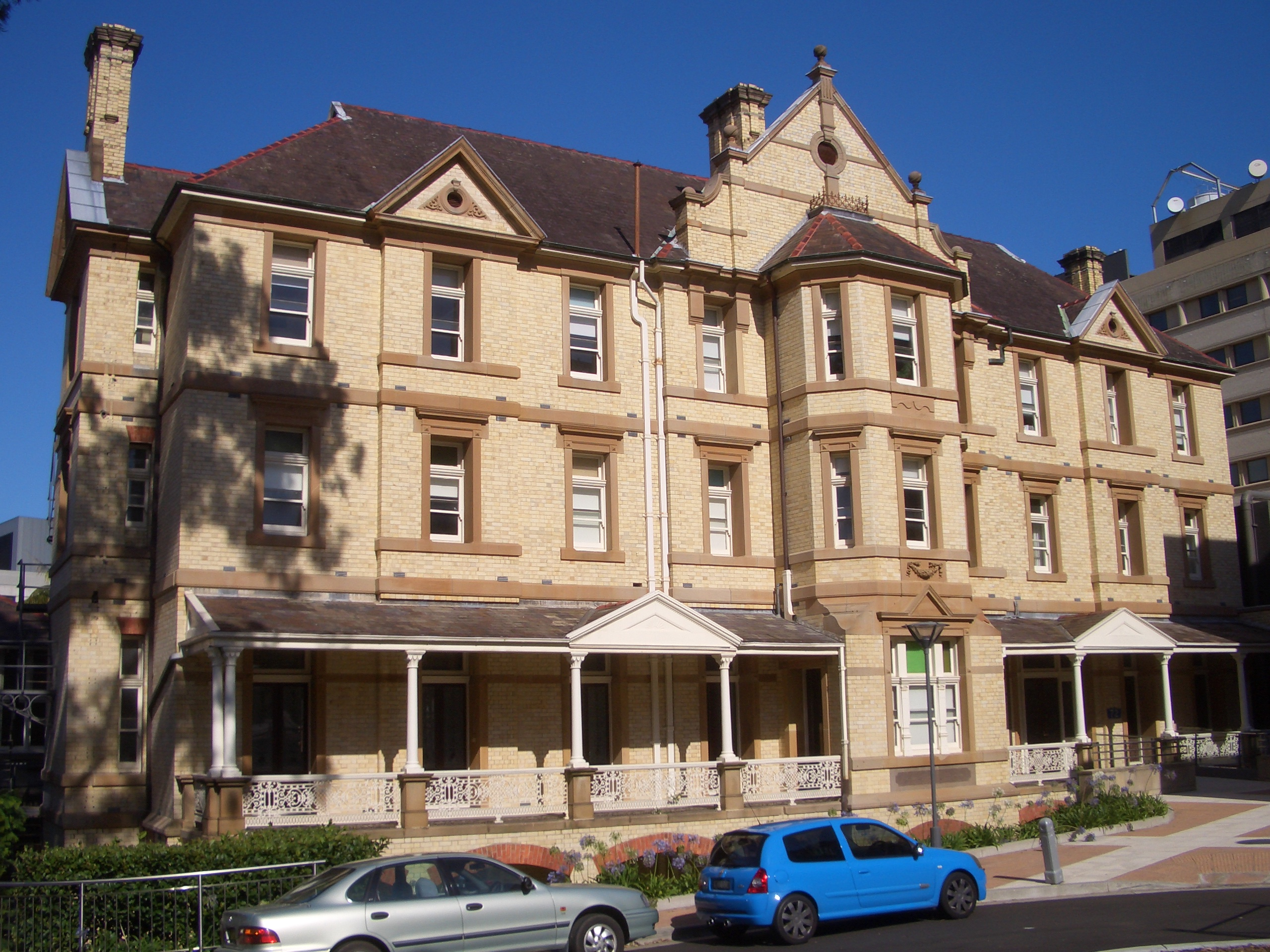
Kerry Packer Education Centre

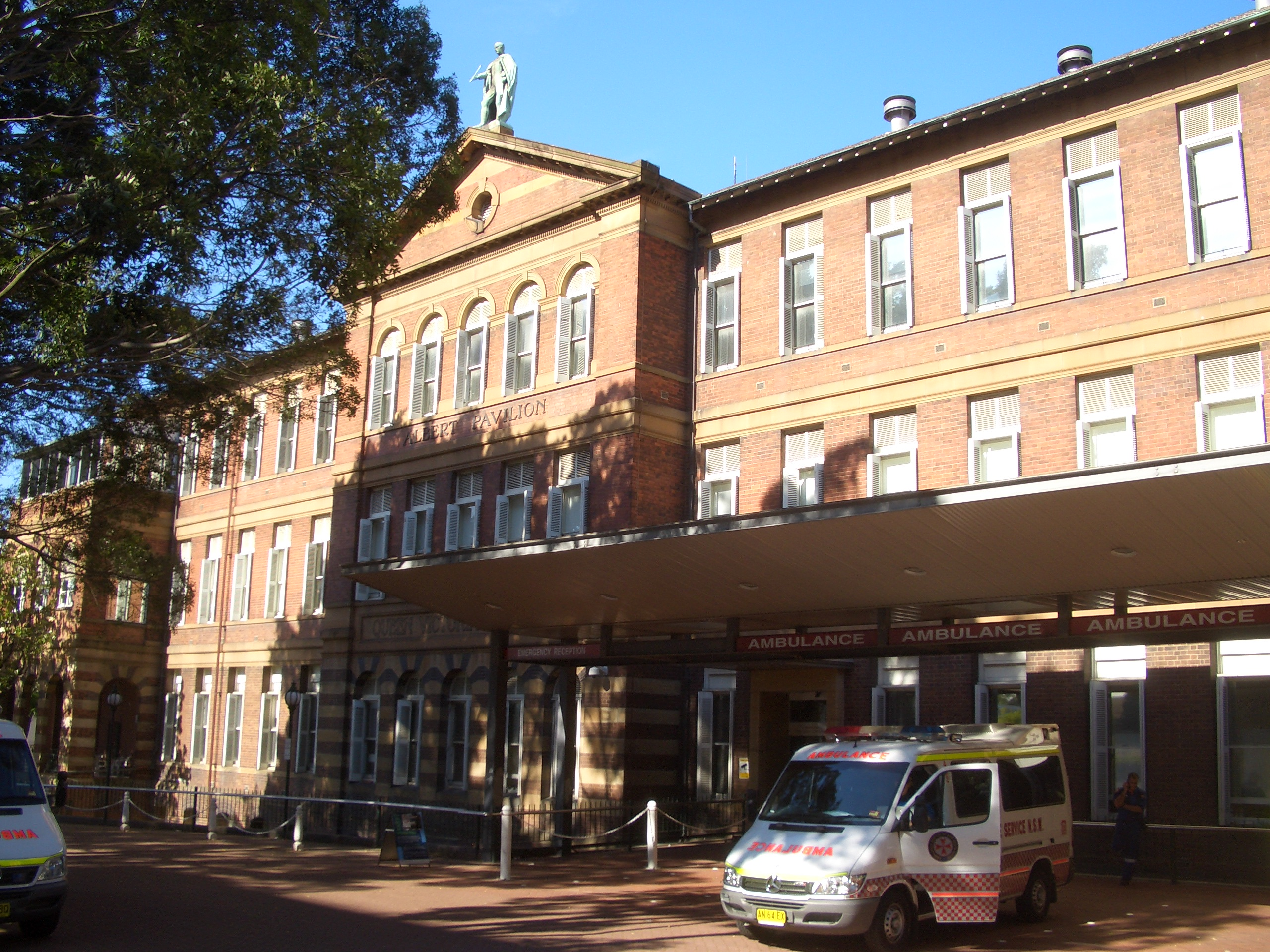
Royal Prince Albert Pavilion

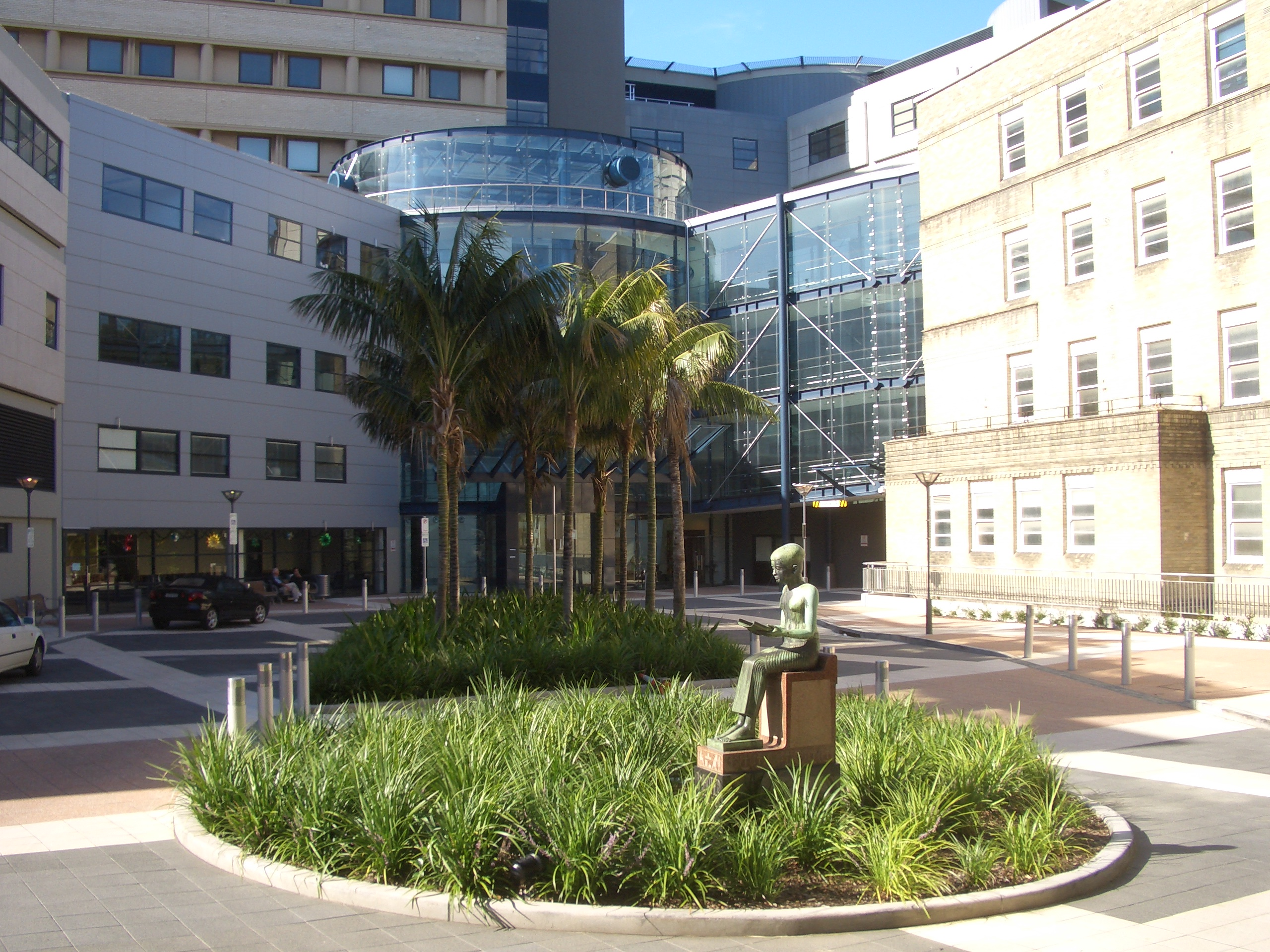
Royal Prince Alfred Hospital

== Demographics ==
At the 2021 census there were 9,381 people living in Camperdown. In Camperdown, 59.4% of people were born in Australia. The next most common countries of birth were England 5.0%, China 3.7%, New Zealand 3.0%, India 1.8% and United States of America 1.6%. 73.2% of people only spoke English at home. Other languages spoken at home included Mandarin 4.5% and Cantonese 1.8%. The most common responses for religion were No Religion 58.1% and Catholic 14.7%.

== Education ==
A large part of Camperdown is taken up by the University of Sydney and the residential colleges within the university. These colleges include: St John's College, St Andrew's College, St Paul's College, Sancta Sophia College, Wesley College and The Women's College.

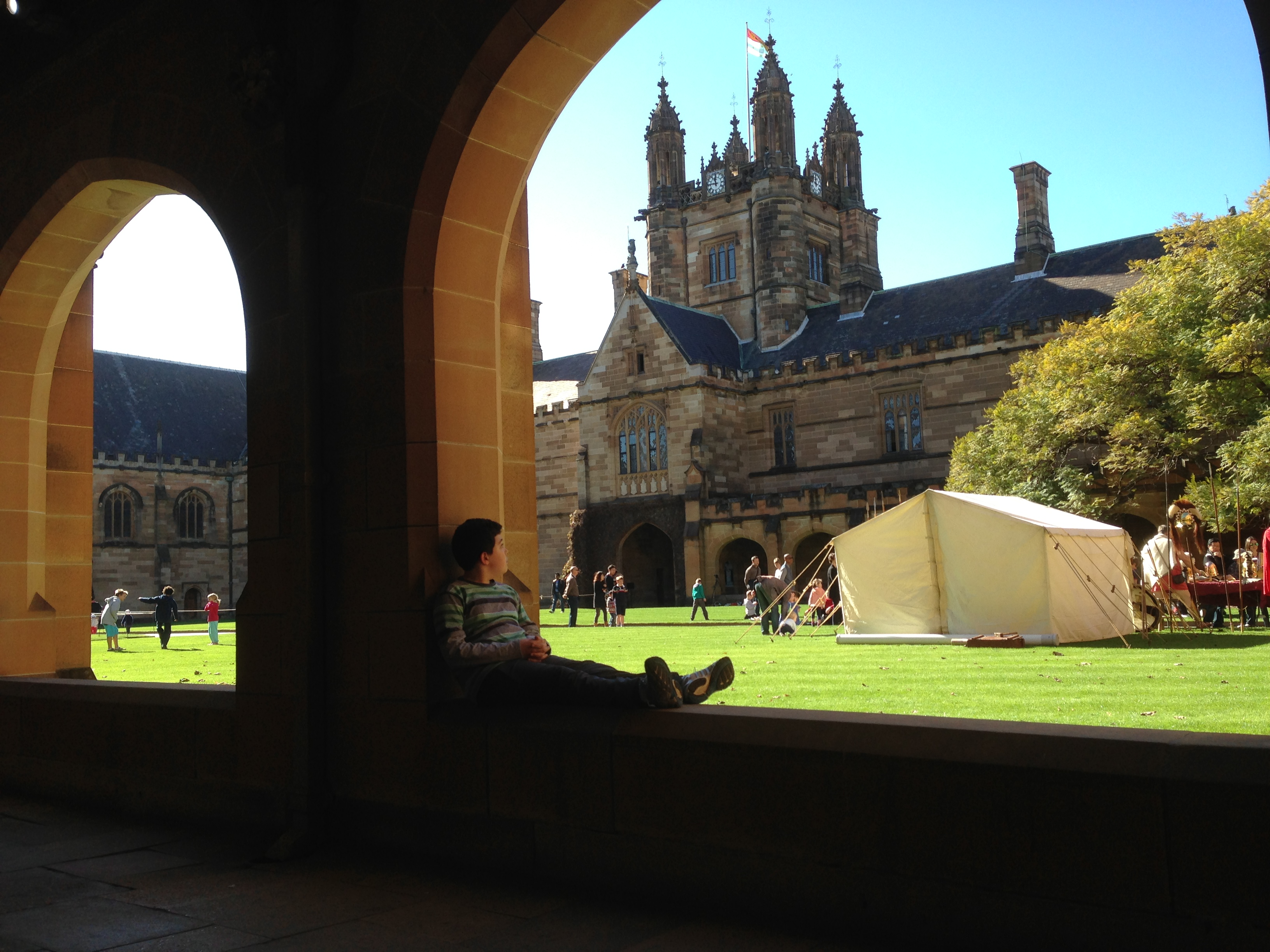
Main Quadrangle, University of Sydney

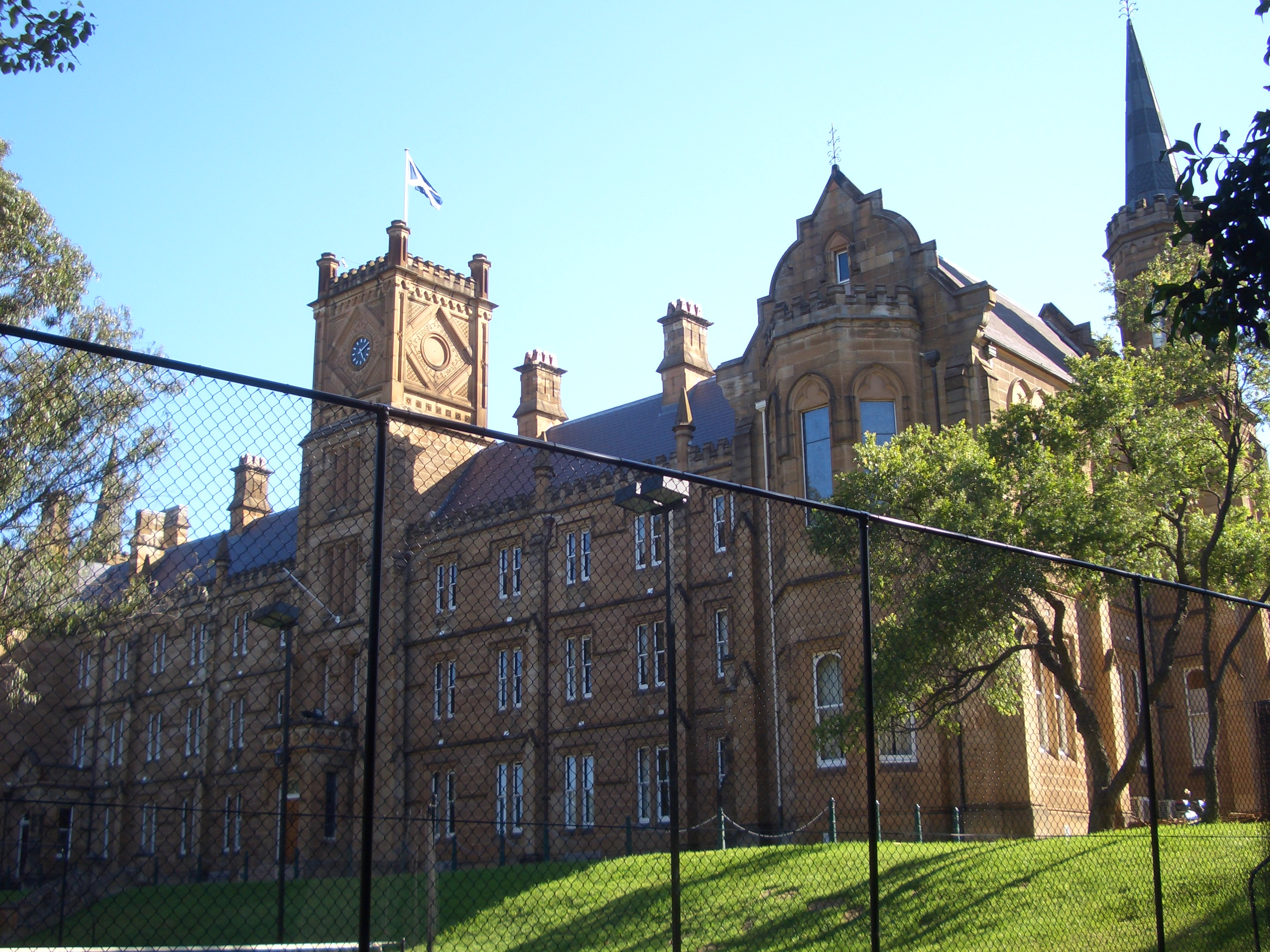
St Andrew's College, University of Sydney

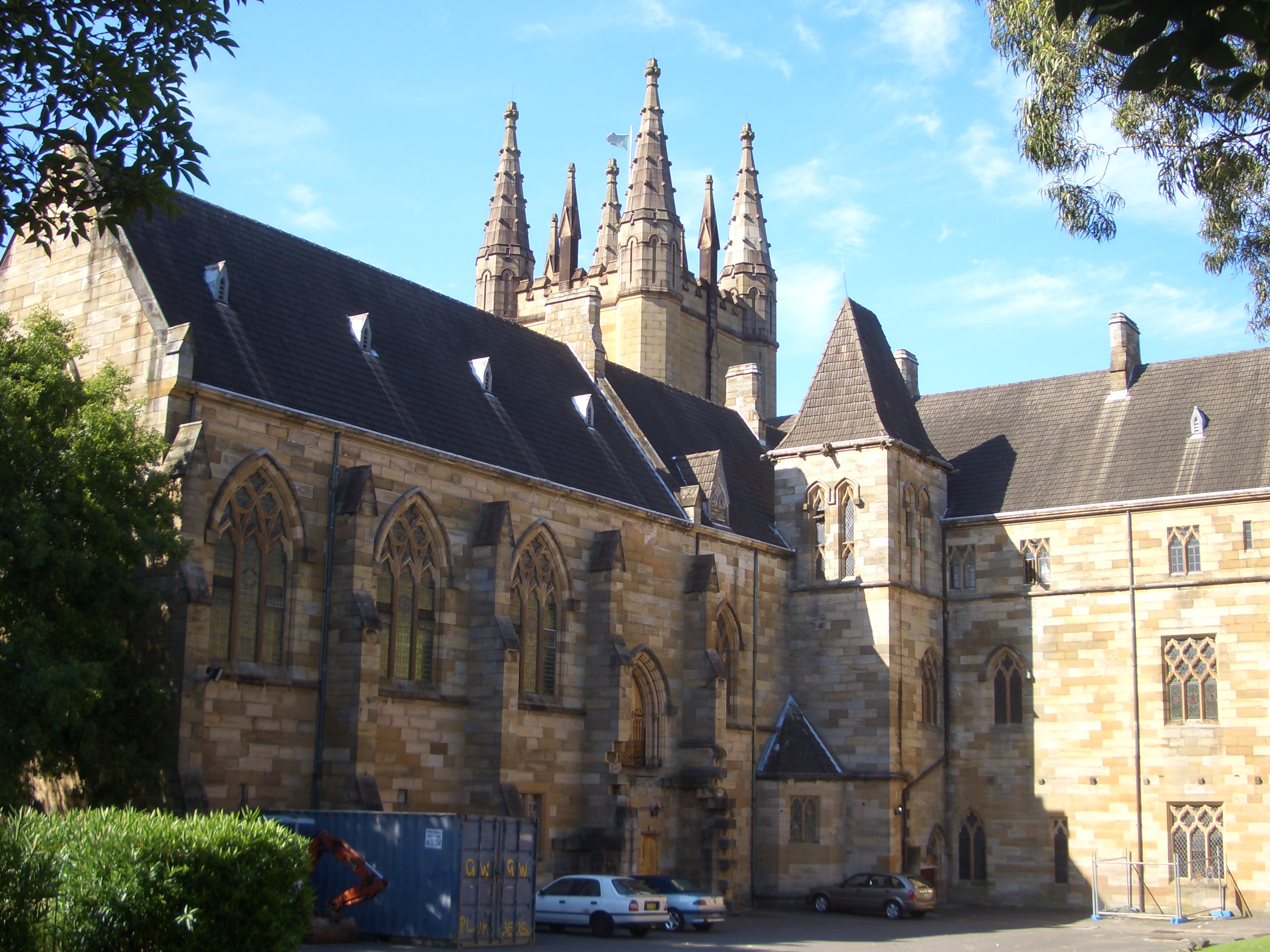
St John's College, University of Sydney

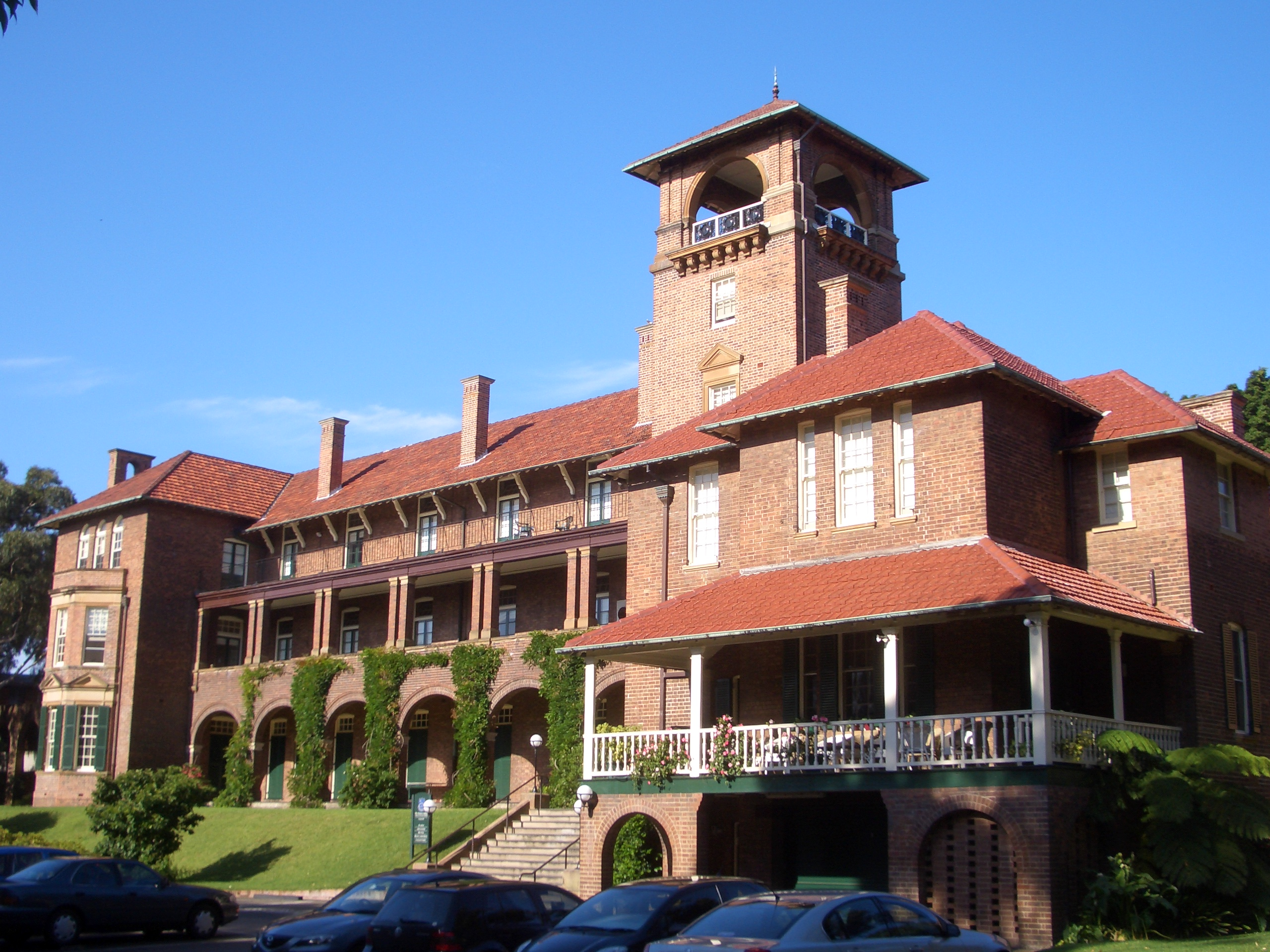
The Women's College, University of Sydney

== Houses ==
In common with neighbouring inner city suburbs such as Newtown and Enmore, Camperdown has large areas of Victorian terraced housing, including many examples of single storey terraces. There are several examples of semi-detached houses which became popular around the time of Australia's Federation at the turn of the 20th century. With the advent of gentrification, from the late 20th century, modern infill development now tends to be sympathetic with the traditional Victorian and Edwardian streetscapes.

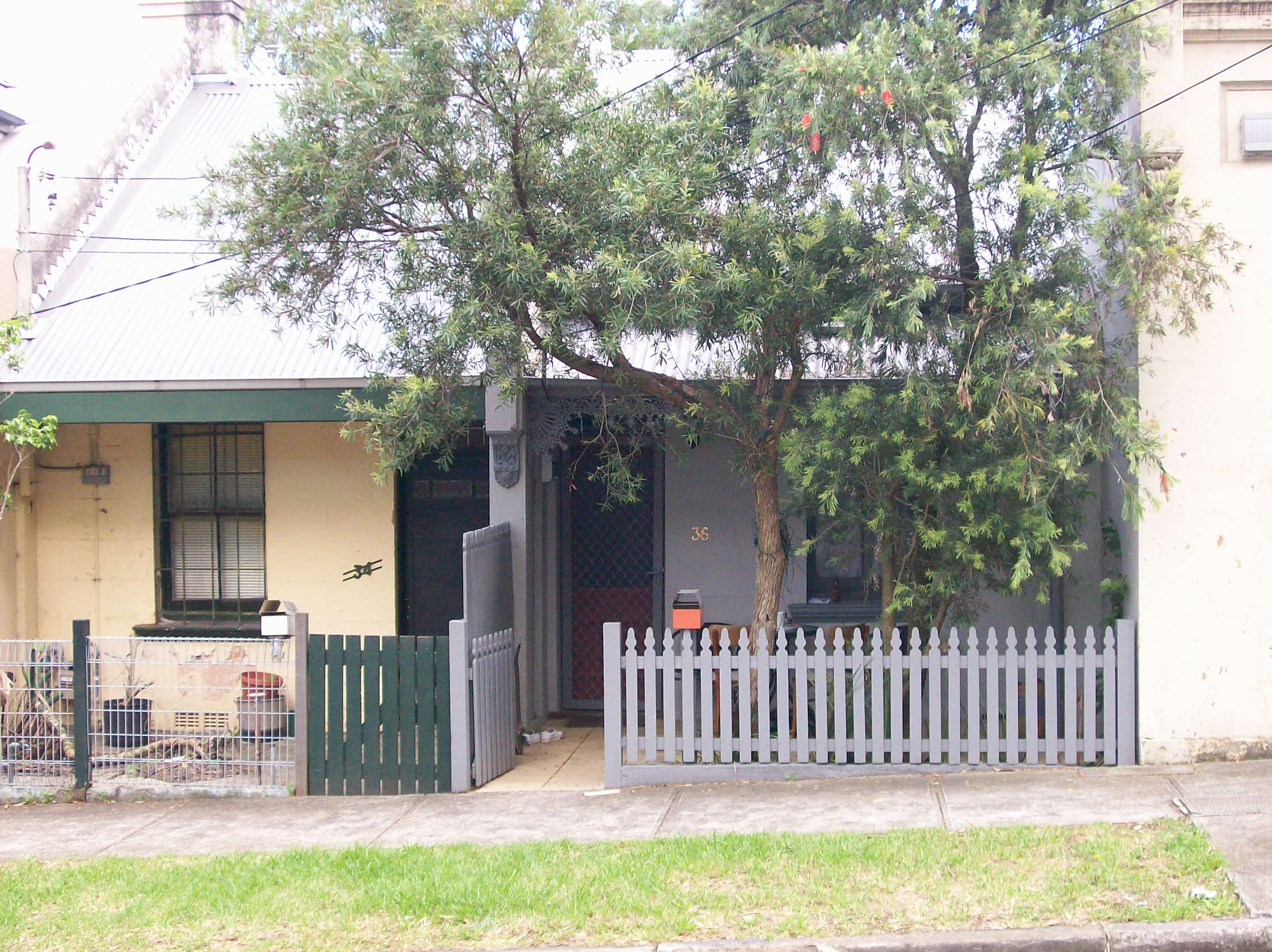
Modest terraced homes

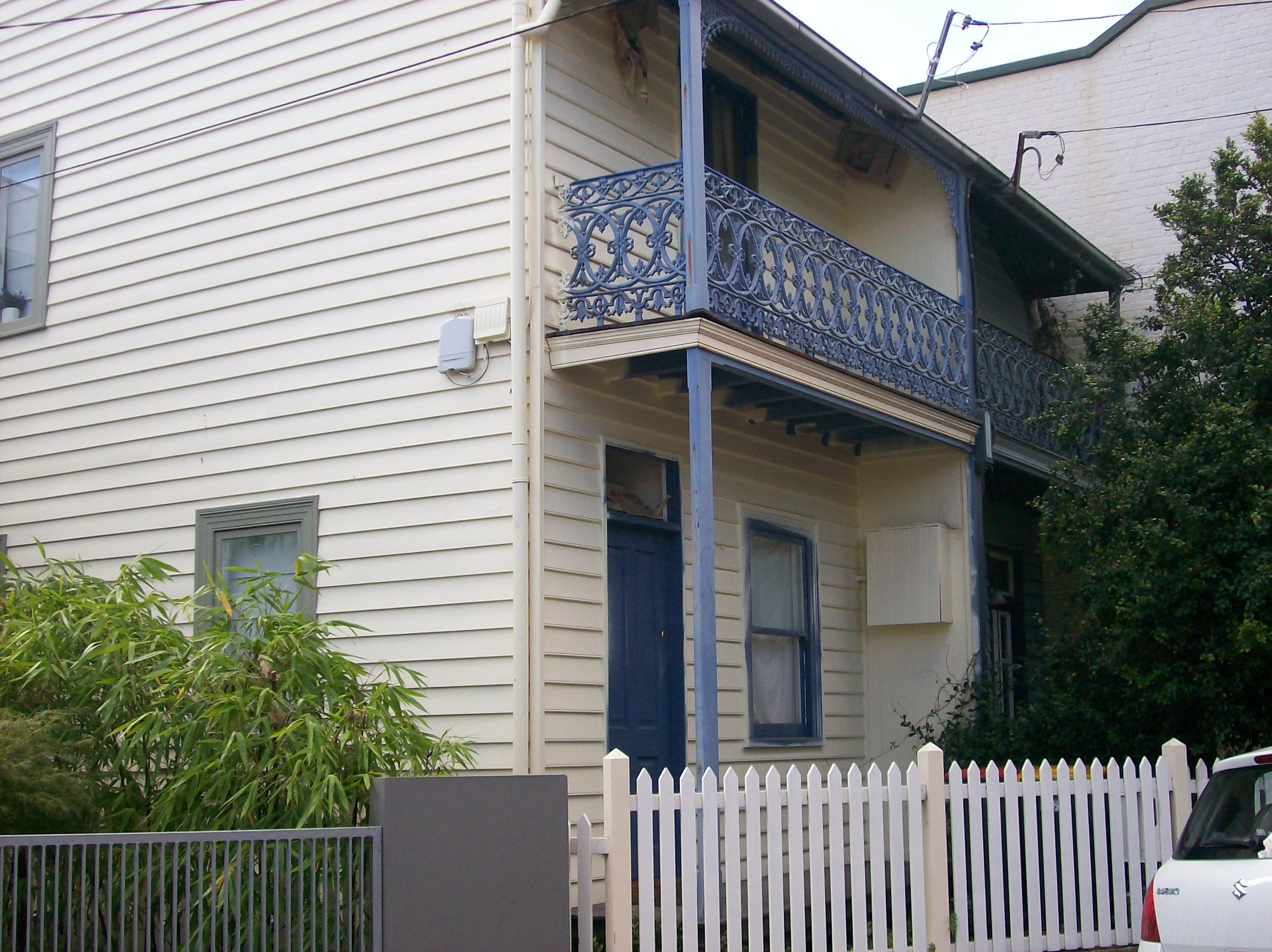
Weatherboard terraces

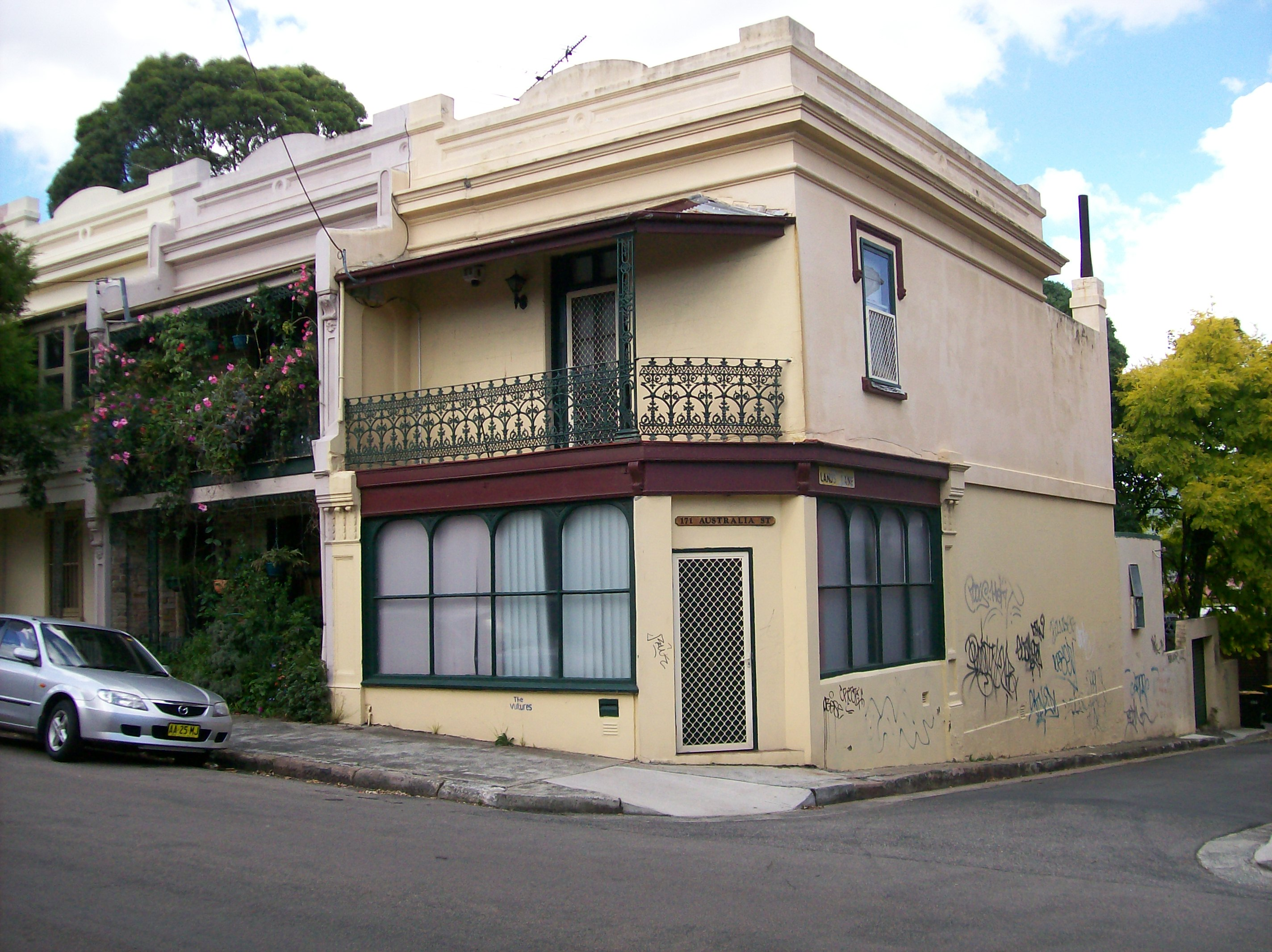
Former corner store

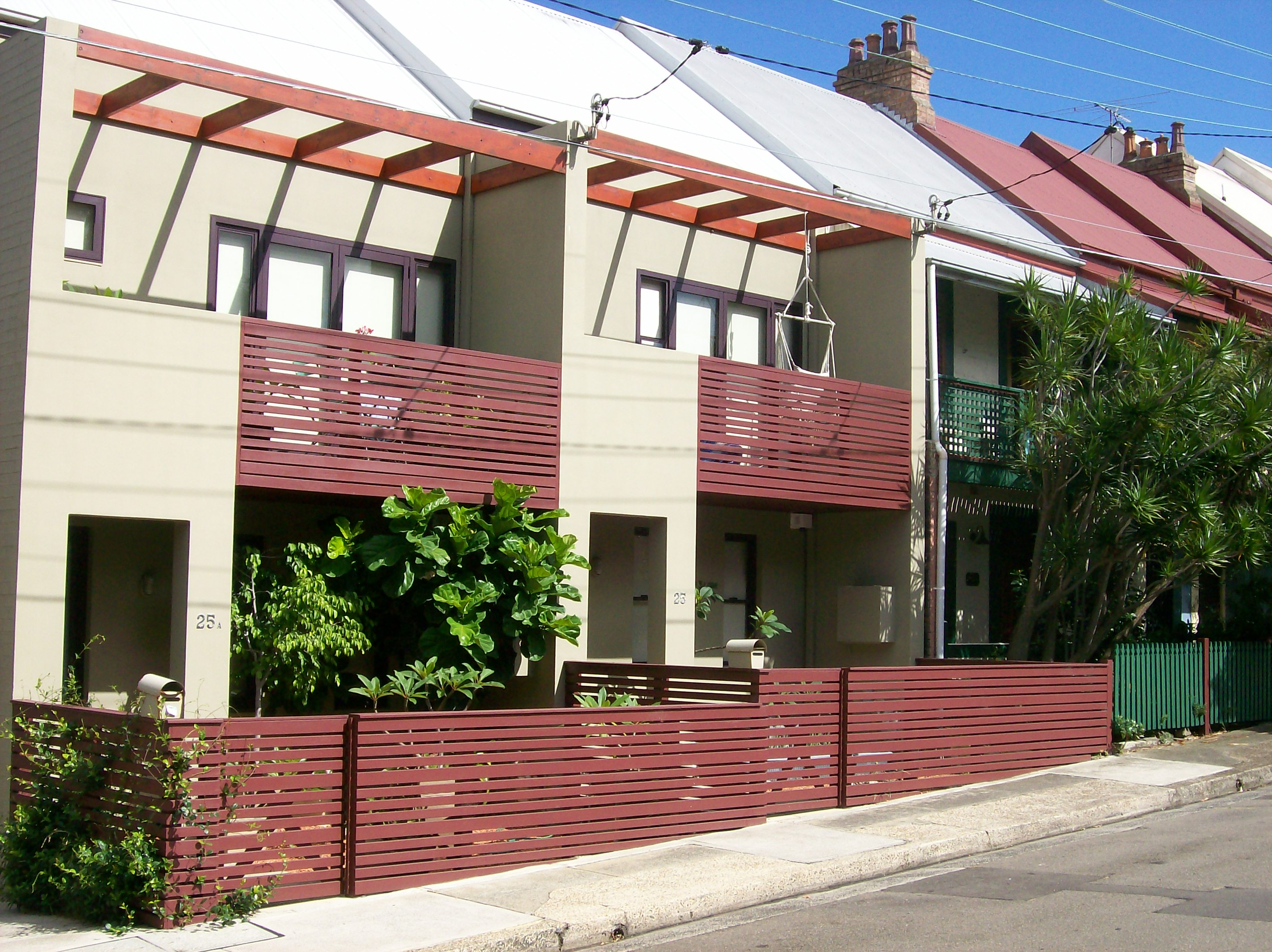
Infill

== Parks ==
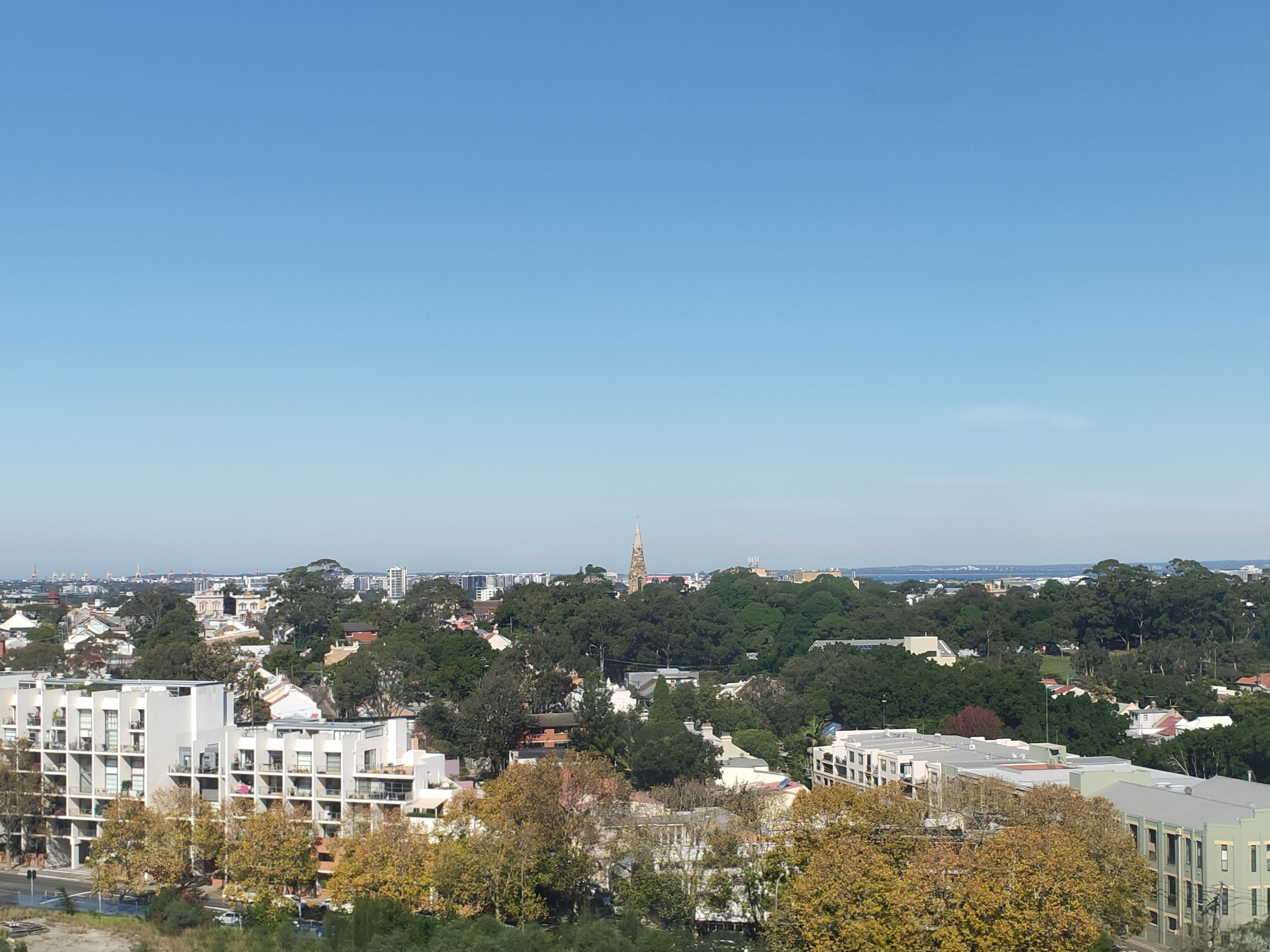
View of the Camperdown and Newtown local area

Victoria Park is located on the corner of Parramatta Road and City Road, adjacent to the University of Sydney.

Camperdown Park is surrounded by Mallett, Pidcock, Fowler and Australia Streets and includes several sports grounds and an urban farm.

Contrary to popular belief and naming conventions, the highly-frequented 'Camperdown Memorial Park' is actually located in the suburb of Newtown.

== Transport ==
=== Roads ===
Parramatta Road (Great Western Highway) (A22) is a major transport artery between Sydney and Parramatta. It runs across the northern side of Camperdown. City Road (A36) is part of a major route to the southern suburbs of Sydney. It meets Parramatta Road and Broadway at a major intersection on the eastern tip of Camperdown. Both City Road and Parramatta Road had tram services until the late 1950s.

== In popular culture ==
The suburb is mentioned in the song "Australia Street" by the band Sticky Fingers, featuring on their 2013 album Caress Your Soul.

The poem "The Sleeping City, Australia Street" by Helen Loughlin references many sites around the Camperdown area.

In the television series Colin from Accounts, the exterior of 33 Hopetoun Street, Camperdown appears as the home of main character Gordon Crapp.

== Notable people ==
- Anthony Albanese, politician, leader of the Australian Labor Party, Prime Minister of Australia and member of House of Representatives, for Grayndler
- Bob Holland, test cricketer
- Mile Jedinak, footballer
- Beverly Robertson, Lions Australia
- Eddie Woo, maths teacher
- Cristian Volpato, footballer
