= Victoria & Albert Pavilions =

Heritage buildings in Sydney, New South Wales

Victoria and Albert Pavilions, Royal Prince Alfred Hospital
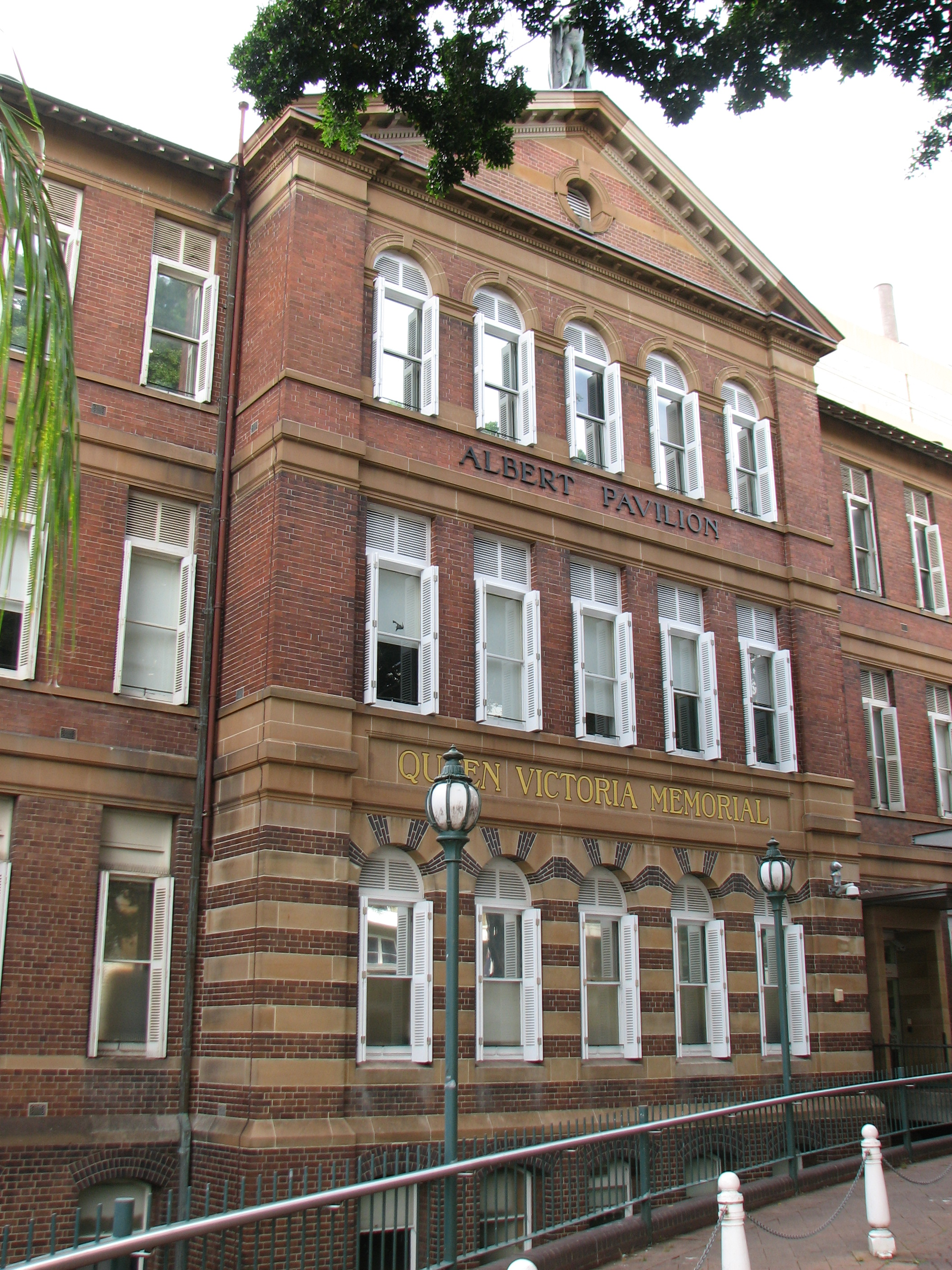
- Albert Pavilion

- Location within Sydney Location within Australia
- 33°53′24″S 151°10′58″E
- Location: Royal Prince Alfred Hospital, Missenden Road, Camperdown, City of Sydney, New South Wales, Australia

History
- Built: 1901–1904

Site notes
- Architect: Walter Liberty Vernon
- Owner: NSW Department of Health

New South Wales Heritage Register
- Official name: Royal Prince Alfred Hospital - Victoria & Albert Pavilions; RPA
- Type: State heritage (built)
- Designated: 2 April 1999
- Reference no.: 829
- Type: Hospital
- Category: Health Services

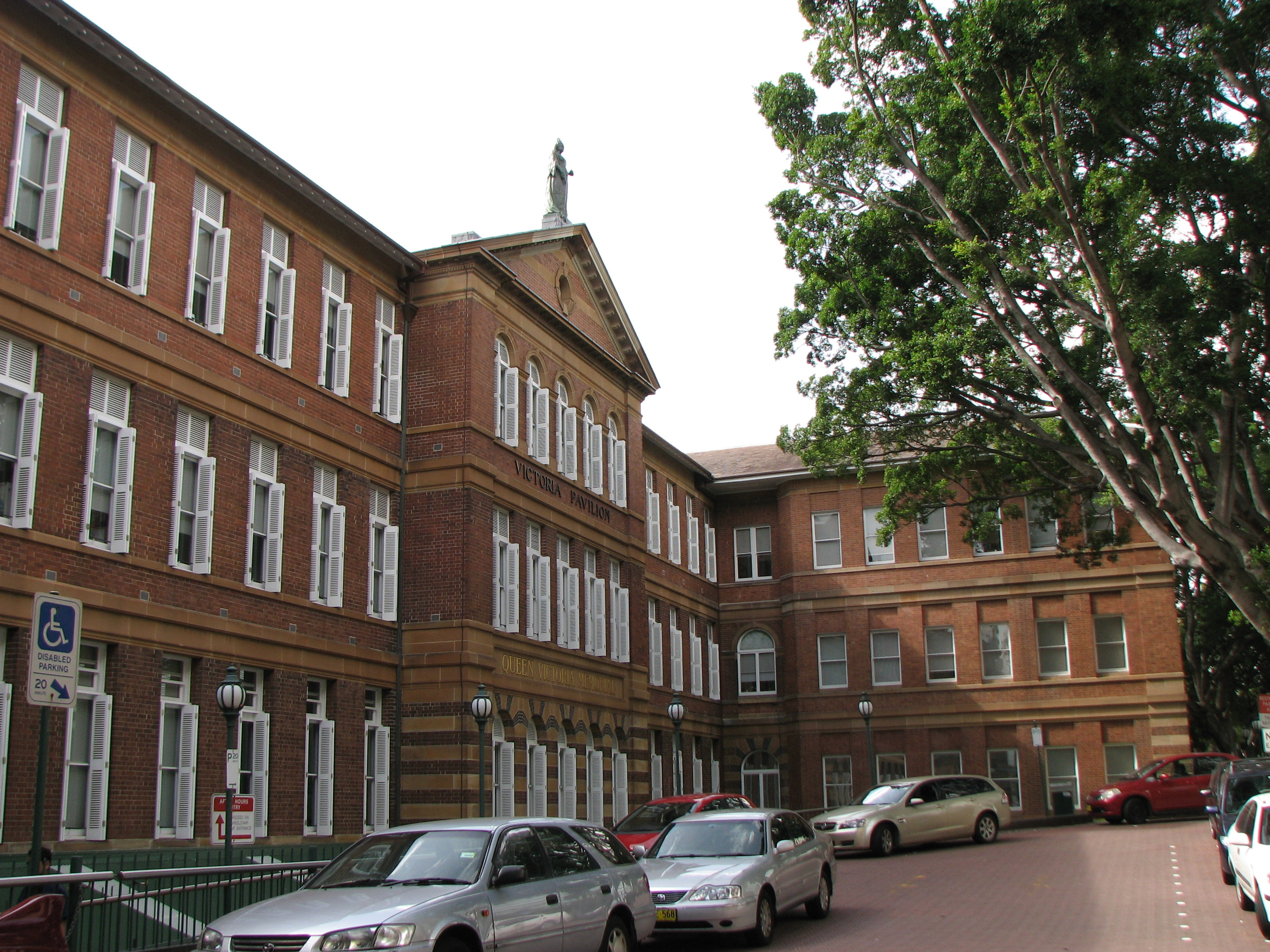
Victoria Pavilion

The Queen Victoria and Prince Albert Pavilions are jointly heritage-listed public hospital buildings within the Royal Prince Alfred Hospital at Missenden Road, Camperdown, City of Sydney, New South Wales, Australia. The pavilions were designed by NSW Government Architect Walter Liberty Vernon in consultation with Mansfield Brothers and built from 1901 to 1904. They were added to the New South Wales State Heritage Register on 2 April 1999.

== History ==
The Queen Victoria and Prince Albert Pavilions (often called the Victoria and Albert Pavilions or Blocks) were designed as mirror-reverse twin pavilions attached to either side of the Administration Building, Queen Victoria for female patients and Prince Albert for males. They completed the original pavilion plan though their detailed design was contemporary. They were built to commemorate the death of Queen Victoria and were funded by donations. The two Pavilions were built 1901–1904 to a design by the Government Architect in consultation with Mansfield Brothers. The original design is shown on drawings PH213/142, 164 which are signed by W. L. Vernon as Government Architect and by George Oakeshott. The foundation stone was laid by the Duke of York, the future King George V. There is reputed to have been a competition between public and private sectors in the completion on these buildings, but this has not been substantiated.

The building was originally built as long wards with a central section for nurses, etc. This section projected at the rear (east) forming another wing accommodation, a special ward on the ground floor, and operating theatre on the first, incorporating a lift and stair. Access was by arcaded balcony on the eastern side. Toilet blocks were located at both ends of the pavilion separated by air locks which included a 'dumbwaiter' type lift and a sink. Subsequent alterations included the enclosure of the balconies to form corridors and some sub-division of the wards.

In 1907 the operating theatres were completed incorporating the latest design and technology. An undated drawing PH213/48 shows alterations to the operating theatre. The interior is shown in an early photograph. Due to insufficient funds some wards remained closed for some years and nurses were accommodated on the top floor. In 1914 the top two floors were used as accommodation for nurses. Between 1918 and 1926, returned soldiers were accommodated on these floors and the Department of Defence funded and equipped the wards.

There have been various subsequent alterations and additions, particularly on the eastern and southern sides. part of the original building was demolished in c. 1935 to build the Fairfax Institute of Pathology fronting Missenden Road. In 1937 a new X-ray department was established in a single-storey brick, flat-roofed addition at the rear of the Victoria Pavilion. In 1956 lifts were installed in the building. In 1966 there were further additions to accommodate new equipment including additional storey on the 1937 additions. There were further additions to the rear of these buildings recently to accommodate a medical imaging facility (MRI). The main wing has been converted to offices and the large wards subdivided.

== Description ==
=== Albert Pavilion ===
Albert Pavilion is located on the northern side of the Administration Block. The original building consists of three levels above a basement, matching that of the Administration Blocks. It is a load-bearing brick structure with concrete floors on steel beams and with a terracotta tiled roof. There is a single-storey L-shaped brick-and-fibro annex and new concrete-and-steel additions. The original drawings note the floor as terracotta lumber, balcony and bathrooms with silicate paving on Monier and location of wall vents is noted in detail.

Albert Pavilion is in the Federation Free Classical style, and is symmetrical about the projected bay of the central wing which is surmounted by a pediment bearing a copper-clad statue of Prince Albert. It is fenestrated by regular banks of shuttered windows. The walls are of high-quality red brickwork with stone dressing to sills string courses and the pediment, etc. the central bay and north ends have 'blood and bandages' detailing to the lower levels. Additions are described above and are largely insubstantial and insignificant structures. Most recent is the lightweight metal structure forming the ambulance entry on the west (Missenden Road) side and a single- and two-storey concrete-and-steel addition on the east side near the Administration Building.

=== Victoria Pavilion ===
Victoria Pavilion is located on the southern side of the Administration Block. The original building consists of three levels above a basement, matching that of the Administration Blocks. There are later date additions to the original building including the 1935 Fairfax Institute of Pathology, the 1969 Haematology Department.

The original Victoria Pavilion is a load bearing brick structure with concrete floors on steel beam and with terracotta tiled hip roof. It is in the Federation Free Classical style, and is symmetrical about the pedimented bay of the central wing. There are regular banks of shuttered windows. The walls are of high quality red brick works with stone dressings. The building was originally built as long wards with a central wing for nurses. Access was by arcaded balcony on the eastern side. Toilet blocks were located at both ends of the pavilion separated by air locks which included a "dumb waiter" type lift and a sink. later balconies were closed to form corridors and wards subdivided.

The 1935 four storey extension is a steel and concrete framed structure with brick cladding and stone dressing and slate roof to match the original building. the 1969 addition at the rear of the original building is a two-storey brick structure with a concrete floor and flat roof.

The Victoria Pavilion and its later addition appear to be in reasonable condition except for damage from rusting arch bars on the southern wall. Despite substantial additions and internal alterations elements of original design survive such as stairs, toilet towers and external features.

== Significance ==
Both pavilions are of high significance for the following values:

- an integral part of the early development of RPA Hospital
- a surviving element of the original, symmetrical, master plan for the hospital
- the surviving facades and roof form are finely detailed examples of Federation architecture
- together with the Administration Building, the group has an important landmark quality as one of the most imposing facades in Sydney
- the relationship of built form and landscaping to Missenden Road is very important to the streetscape
- as a major surviving work executed under the Government Architect Walter Liberty Vernon

== Heritage listing ==
The Victoria and Albert Pavilions form part of the Royal Prince Alfred Hospital Precinct which is of high historical and architectural significance. These substantial buildings have high streetscape value.

Victoria & Albert Pavilions, Royal Prince Alfred Hospital was listed on the New South Wales State Heritage Register on 2 April 1999.

== See also ==
- Admission Block, Royal Prince Alfred Hospital
- Australian non-residential architectural styles
