= Cranbrook, Camperdown =

Cranbrook
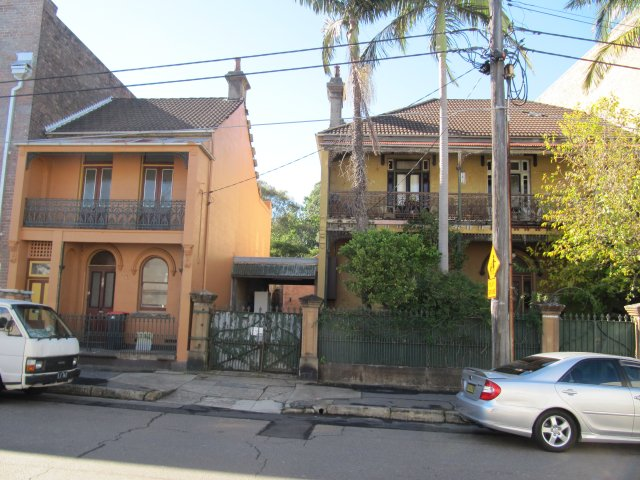
- No 10 and 14 Australia Street

- Location within New South Wales Location within Australia
- 33.8879°S 151.1748°E
- Location: 10 & 14 Australia Street, Camperdown, Inner West Council, New South Wales, Australia

History
- Built: 1879–1881

New South Wales Heritage Register
- Official name: Cranbrook Group; Fowlers House
- Type: state heritage (built)
- Designated: 2 April 1999
- Reference no.: 418
- Type: Villa
- Category: Residential buildings (private)

Cranbrook is a heritage-listed residence at 14 Australia Street, Camperdown, New South Wales, a suburb of Sydney Australia. It was built from 1879 to 1881. It is also known as Fowlers House. It was added to the New South Wales State Heritage Register on 2 April 1999.

== History ==
Cranbrook was built in 1881 by Robert Fowler. Fowler, who had inherited a successful pottery business upon the death of his father Enoch Fowler in 1879, was a prominent businessman and variously mayor of the Municipality of Cook, Municipality of Camperdown and City of Sydney, a member of the New South Wales Legislative Assembly from 1894 to 1895, and an appointed member of the New South Wales Legislative Council thereafter.

Cranbrook featured gardens, ferneries and an orchard, the site of which is now the Camperdown Oval. A bathroom was added in the 1890s.

Robert's brother, John, built the house next door at No. 10. It may have also served as a servants' or managers' house (occupied by manager Robert Tratham), and was connected by a common carriageway and courtyard to the main house at No. 14.

Robert Fowler died of cerebral thrombosis on 12 June 1906 at Cranbrook. His wife, Jane, continued to live there after his death.

In 1919 Cranbrook was sold to Charles Daintree. The garden of Cranbrook was purchased by the Department of Education and added to the Camperdown Public School.

In 1924 a 20 feet (6.1 m) strip of land, on which the ballroom and the orchard stood, was resumed from the house, for the Electricity Meter Manufacturing Co Ltd.

In 1981 the two houses No. 10 and 14 were owned by the Brown family and let to Ken Robson who sublet rooms. At this time Marrickville Council applied to the Heritage Council for a section 130 order to prevent harm or demolition to the buildings. This was enacted on 12 March 1982 and again on 10 August 1984.

By 1982, the property had a new owner, Garry Nicholls. In 1985, he nominated the two houses (as the Cranbrook Group) for a Permanent Conservation Order with the intention of restoring the properties. A Permanent Conservation Order was made over the property on 19 July 1985.

== Description ==
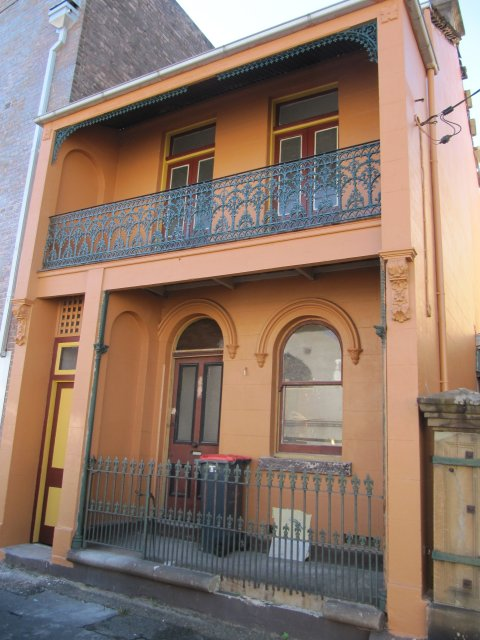
No 10 Australia Street

No. 10 - A terrace style two bedroom house featuring round-headed door and window with arched mouldings on the lower floor and another panelled door and cast iron fence with French doors on the upper floor. Roof is iron tiled. Much of the detail of the terrace matches the grander house Cranbrook at No. 14.

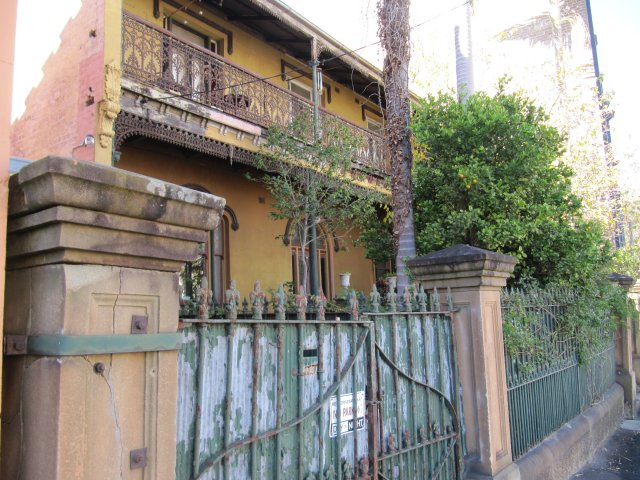
No 14 Australia Street (Cranbrook)

No. 14 (Cranbrook) - A large two-storey Italianate villa of five bedrooms with boxroom and rear courtyards. Retains cast-iron fence and verandahs, dentillated trim to the verandah, large stuccoed chimneys and exterior steps with marble hand-rails and sandstone balusters. Interior features marble fireplaces and etched and coloured glass, elaborately carved staircase.

== Heritage listing ==
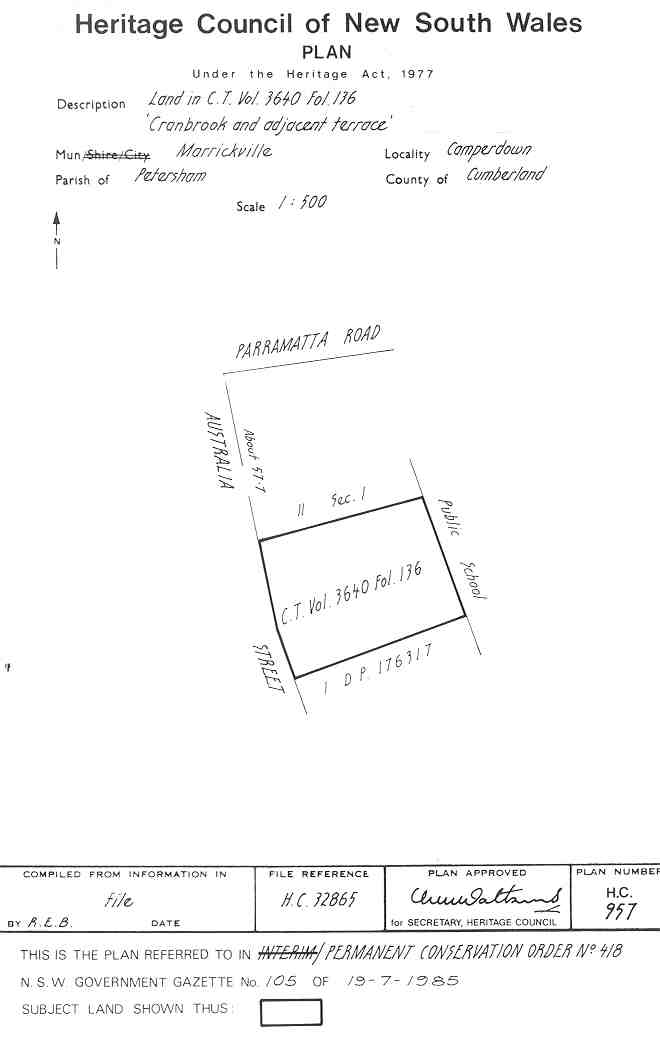
Heritage boundaries

The Cranbrook Group is of State historic significance as part of the last portion of the once-extensive Fowler estate, which at one time covered most of Camperdown. It is associated with Enoch Fowler and was the home of Robert Fowler owner of Fowler Pottery and Lord Mayor of Sydney and Camperdown. The Fowler family were early pioneers of the pottery industry in NSW producing pipes, tiles, chimney pots and items for residential and industrial use. The group is of aesthetic significance as they retain most of their original Italianate features.

Cranbrook was listed on the New South Wales State Heritage Register on 2 April 1999.
