= Cranbrook Elementary School =

Coordinates: 40.02484°N 83.038681°W

Location
- 908 Bricker Boulevard; Columbus, OH 43221; USA

Information
- Established: ._.1957._.
- School district: Columbus City Schools
- Superintendent: Angela Chapman
- Principal: Maria Grossman
- Enrollment: 305 (as of 2010-11)
- Information: 614-365-5497
- Website: School website

Cranbrook Elementary School is a public elementary school in the Northwest Columbus area in Ohio, USA. It is rated "Excellent" by the Ohio Department of Education and was honored by the Blue Ribbon Schools Program in 2003. Cranbrook serves students in grades Kindergarten through 5 as well as early childhood education.
