= Cranbrook School, Ilford =

Cranbrook School (Cranbrook College)

Location
- Mansfield Road; Ilford, IG1 3BD; England; 51°33′46″N 0°04′00″E

Information
- Type: Independent
- Motto: Per laborem ad honorem
- Established: 1896
- Closed: 2016
- Department for Education URN: 102868 Tables
- Headmaster: David Morrison
- Gender: Mixed
- Age: 3 to 16

Cranbrook School (formally Cranbrook College) was an independent co-educational school, located in Ilford, Greater London, England. The Cognita Group owned and operated the school until its closure in 2016. At that time the school covered the full range of academic years from Nursery to Year 11. Previously, in 2011, Cranbrook had merged with Glenarm College, another Cognita school in Ilford.

== History ==
Cranbrook School (formerly known as Cranbrook College) was founded in 1896 as a boys only school. The school was acquired by Cognita Schools Limited in April 2007.

From 2001 to 2009, the school enjoyed a fruitful partnership with the nearby Cranbrook Baptist Church. Weekly school assemblies were held in the church, many of which were led by the school chaplain, Rev Ivan King.

In January 2011, Cranbrook and Glenarm College's integrated into a new site at Mansfield Road, adjacent to the existing Cranbrook College campus. The schools, which shared the same founder, then re-branded themselves under the new title of Cranbrook and were fully co-educational.

Cranbrook School attempted to change from a boys only school into a co-ed mixed school by first opening up the reception, Year 1 and Year 2 classes to girls. However low intake meant female pupils did not continue higher up the school.

On 20 July 2016, reduced pupil numbers forced Cranbrook School to close permanently.

== Buildings ==
Initially, the school consisted of the main building on 34 Mansfield Road and an old building exiting onto Cranbrook Road. The old building comprised 4 main classrooms, the school hall, library, science lab and art room.

In 1992, the school opened the Thornley building, a 2-storey raised building over the main playground. This building comprised two rooms ("T1" and "T2") on the first floor and a larger third room ("T3") spanning the entire building on the second storey which could be partitioned into two smaller rooms. T3 was initially the art room but later became the computer room in the early 2000s. The art room moved to the old building above the science lab where the original computer room was situated.

Following the merger with Glenarm College, the school had invested four million pounds into new building facilities. The school purchased the "Waverley Lodge Care Home" building next door to the school and expanded the preparatory department within the new space.

== Notable former pupils ==
- Ian Greer (1933-2015), political lobbyist, who had a very successful career, until the 1994 Cash-for-questions affair
