= Helen Wilson Fell =

Diarist and philanthropist (1849–1935)

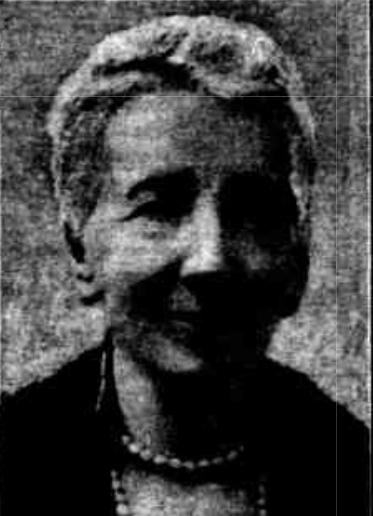
- c. 1930
- Born: Helen Wilson Thomson; 27 July 1849; Hawick
- Died: 13 April 1935 (aged 85); North Sydney
- Known for: philanthropy and her diary
- Spouse: James Walter Fell
- Children: John Walter Fell

Helen Wilson Fell born Helen Wilson Thomson (27 July 1849 – 13 April 1935) was a Scottish-born Australian diarist and philanthropist.

== Life ==
Fell was born in Hawick in what is now the Scottish Borders in 1849. She was one of the six children of the Reverend Adam Thomson who was a Presbyterian minister. Her mother was Helen (born) Ritchie and she died. Her father remarried and the last two of his children were with his second wife, Margaret Smellie, (a widow, born Weir) of Gibraltar. Her father was a leading minister at East Bank Church in Hawick for 27 years.

All of the family emigrated in 1861 to Australia after her father was told to move for reasons of health. In 1868 she notably began her diary. In 1870 her father conducted the wedding between her and James Walter Fell who was two years older than her in Sydney. Her father became the first Principal of St Andrew's College (later part of the University of Sydney) in 1872.

Her husband was a chemistry graduate and one of the first of the extended Fell family to migrate to Australia. James had been pivotal in the amalgamation of two shale oil companies—Hartley Kerosene Oil and Paraffine Co. Ltd. and Western Kerosene Oil Co.—to form the New South Wales Shale & Oil Company, in 1872. James Fell was a founder of the North Shore Gas Company in Sydney.

While visiting London her husband died aged 35 leaving her a wealthy woman with three children. She made her home in North Sydney in a house named Branxholme (Branxholme Castle is near her birthplace). She believed in a sabbath day and temperance. She taught at the local Sunday School at St Peters Presbyterian church which was the oldest church in Sydney.

After her only son, John Walter Fell, died in 1891 she and her daughters returned to Scotland for five years. Back in Australia in 1896 she supported charities and many of these looked after women or children. She was on the board of the successful National Council of Women and later the Women's Liberal League. She was the first treasurer of the Presbyterian Women's Missionary Association in 1891, when Ann Goodlet was the President and Elizabeth Forbes was the secretary.

Fell died in North Sydney in 1935. She was survived by one of her daughters and her remarkable diaries. In 1965 St Andrew's College created a prize for Engineering in memory of her and her husband.
