= Elizabeth Mary Goodlet =

Church worker and philanthropist

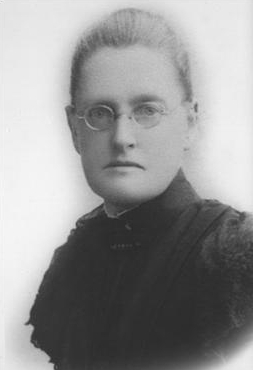
- Born: 1854; Singleton, Colony of New South Wales
- Died: 26 July 1926 (aged 71–72); Canterbury, New South Wales, Australia
- Spouse: John Goodlet

Elizabeth Mary Goodlet born Elizabeth Forbes (1854 – 26 July 1926) was an Australian Church worker and philanthropist who was the secretary of the Presbyterian Women's Missionary Association.

== Life ==
Goodlet was born in 1854 in Singleton. Her parents Jean (born Clark) and Alexander Leith Forbes had her baptised. Her father had been a church minister but he became a school inspector. As an adult she moved with her parents to Ashfield. Her father had been a minister in the Free Church minister in Scotland. She devoted her time to God and Ashfield's Presbyterian Church. She has interested in missionary work, the Sunday School and philanthropy.

In 1891 the new Presbyterian Women's Missionary Association was formed taking in the Presbyterian Church of New South Wales's New Hebrides Mission and Ann Goodlet became its president. Helen Wilson Fell was the treasurer and Elizabeth (then named Forbes) became its secretary. This fulfilled her ambition to be involved in missionary work and she worked hard to gather support for the missionary association. She travelled across New South Wales to recruit and enthuse. In 1894 she went to Scotland to visit the Aberdeen W.M.A and to Egypt to see the work of an American mission. She formed Young People's Mission Bands and the association had fifty branches by 1902 and the church's General Assembly authorised the association to collect money not only for overseas work but also for work in Australia. In 1910 she returned to Scotland to attend the World Missionary Conference in Edinburgh.

== Private life ==
The President of the Presbyterian Women's Missionary Association, Ann Goodlet, died in 1903 and on 3 February 1904 her previous husband John Goodlet married Elizabeth. Her new husband who had a number of business interests died in 1914.

Goodlet died in Canterbury in 1926.
