= Jacaranda, University of Sydney =

Historic tree at the University of Sydney

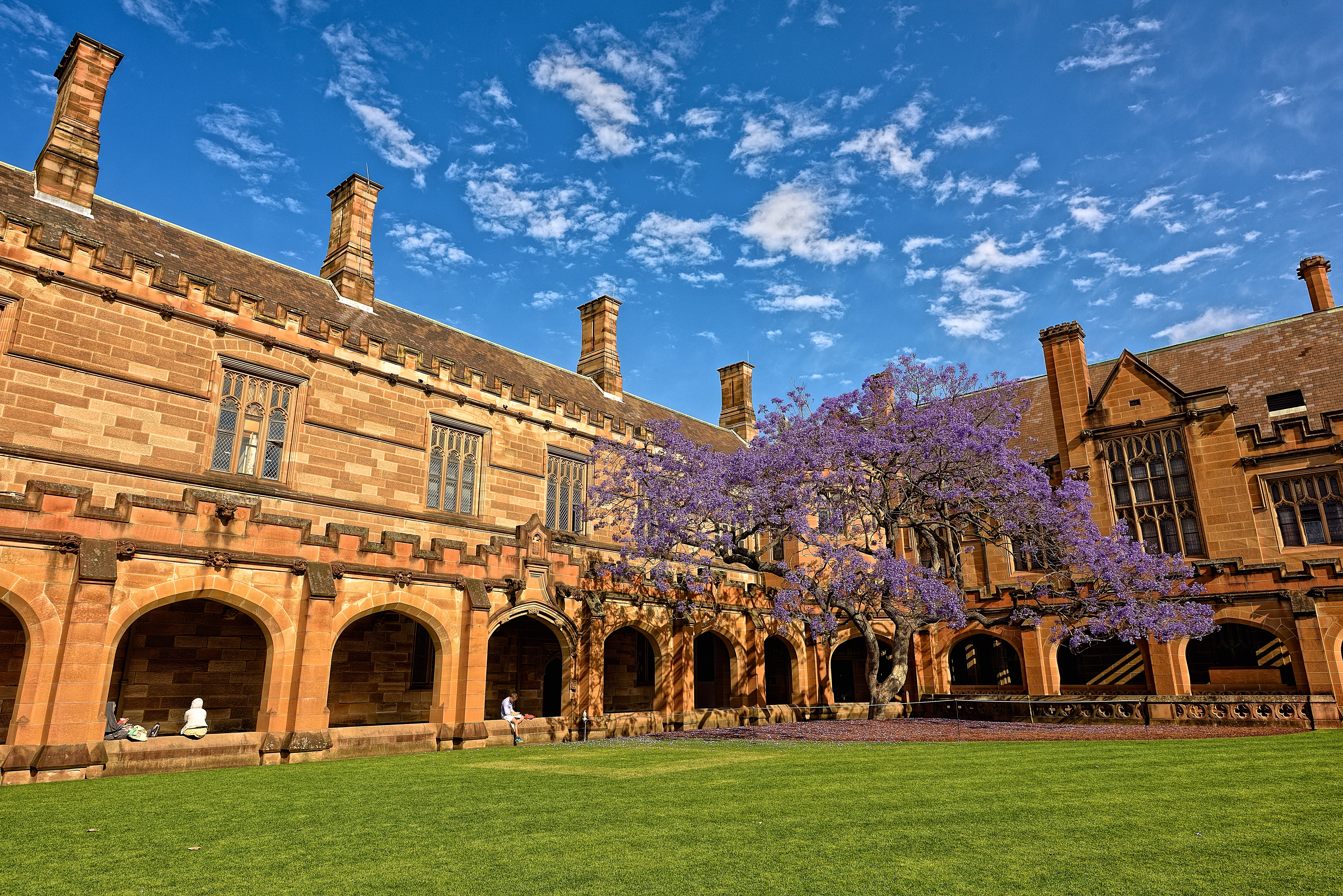
- The jacaranda in the main quadrangle at the University of Sydney (2014)

- Location within inner Sydney
- Species: Jacaranda mimosifolia
- Location: University of Sydney Quadrangle, Camperdown campus of The University of Sydney, Parramatta Road, Sydney, New South Wales, Australia
- Coordinates: 33°53′10″S 151°11′21″E
- Diameter: 18 metres (59 ft) (canopy, 2016 felled tree)
- Date seeded: 1928 (first planting) by Prof. Eben Gowrie Waterhouse; 20 July 2017 (current planting)
- Date felled: 28 October 2016
- Custodian: The University of Sydney

The jacaranda was a historically significant specimen of Jacaranda mimosifolia tree that stood in the south-eastern corner of the University of Sydney main quadrangle, and now describes its clone replanted in the same location.

The first planting was in 1928 by Associate Professor Eben Gowrie Waterhouse, and replaced several times in the 1930s. Blooming in late spring at the end of the academic year, it became closely associated with examination time at the university. It has formed the background to many events, and the original tree was on the City of Sydney's Significant Tree Register. On 28 October 2016 the old tree died and fell over, aged approximately 77–85 years. On 20 July 2017 the university announced the replacement of the jacaranda with a genetically identical clone, and a native Illawarra flame tree in the opposite corner.

== Original tree ==
=== Planting ===
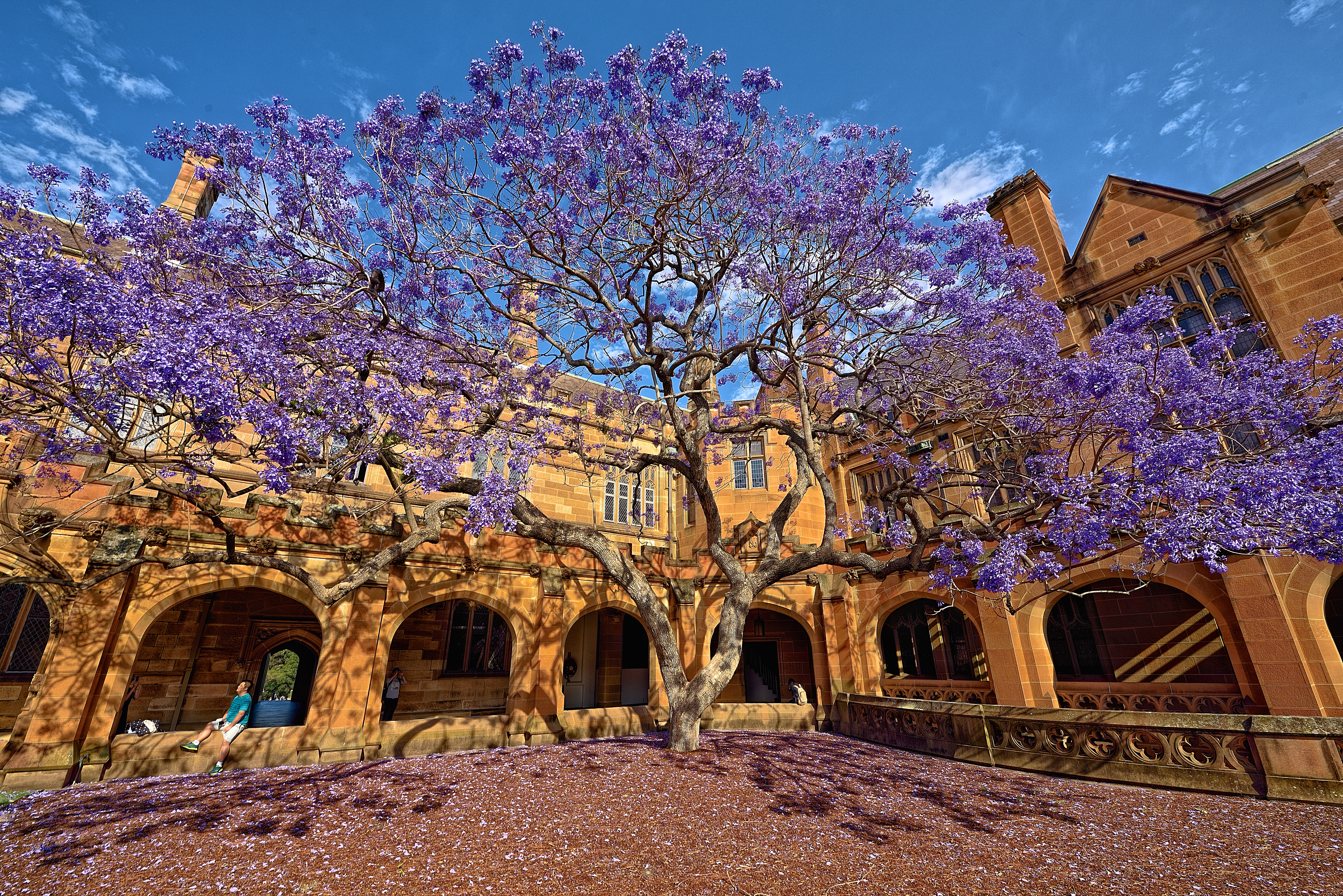
Jacaranda in November 2014

The tree was located in the corner of the quadrangle close to where Philosophy classes used to be held. It was planted by Eben Gowrie Waterhouse, who was McCaughey associate professor of German and comparative literature and also a camellia expert. His interest in horticulture and landscape design influenced the design of the gardens at the university. He is credited with turning the main quadrangle where the jacaranda grew "from an unsightly mess into a dignified area". Waterhouse continued to be engaged for many years on beautification schemes involving tree planting for the university, in the city beyond the university, as well as in other cities beyond Sydney. In an address given in Newcastle in 1936, Waterhouse said that "beautification of urban and suburban areas ranked among the finest forms of community service" and that in tree planting, the preservation of trees and the creative work were both important. In 1966 he received a gold medal from the Royal Horticultural Society, London.

Stories about the difficulty of establishing the tree circulated for many years. Students were blamed for several failed efforts after young trees were ripped out and frustrated Committee members passed "motions deploring the actions of 'irresponsible vandals'". Vandalism concerning the jacaranda was included in newspaper reports as late as 1939. An alternative view is that staff stole young trees for their own gardens. Eventually, the planting succeeded and over its life, the jacaranda's canopy grew to a width of 18 metres (59 ft), becoming both "grand" and "iconic".

=== Life ===
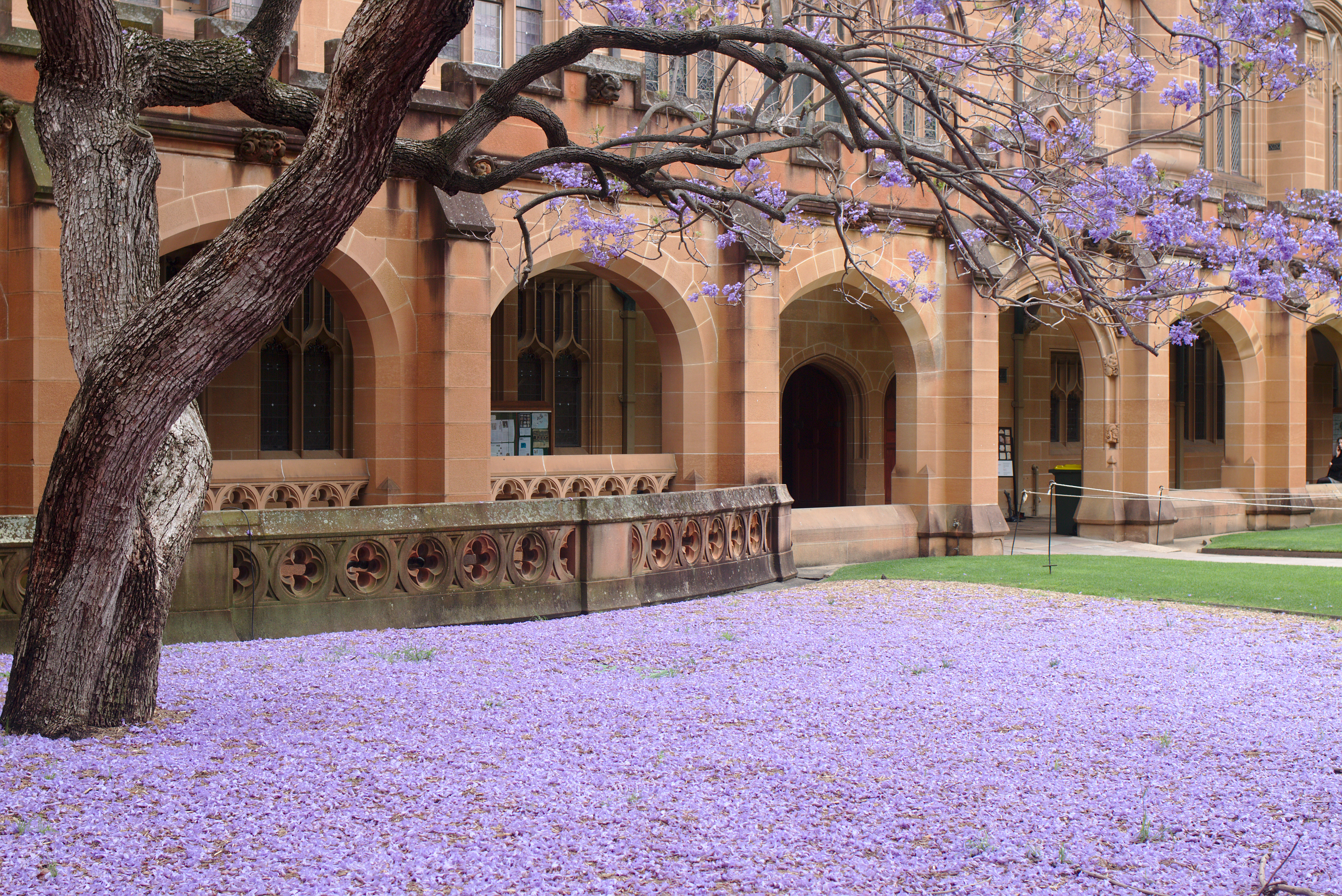
The flowers of the jacaranda carpeting the lawn in 2015

Sydney University's jacaranda formed the backdrop to many public and private events that took place in the quadrangle, including graduations and weddings. In the opinion of Mark Scott, it was "the most famous tree in education". The university's landscape and grounds manager said "I don't think the quadrangle would be the space it is without that tree."

The tree was well-loved in spite of its association with the examination period in November when jacarandas all over Sydney come into flower. Accepted wisdom was that exam failure was inevitable for a student who had not yet begun to study by the time its purple blooms appeared.

In 2005 the jacaranda was added to the list of historic or environmentally significant trees in the City of Sydney as "one of Sydney's best known significant trees". It was known as "a living asset". In 2012, the city's chief arborist placed it in the Register's Top 10. The trees on the Register are selected on the basis of their "historical, cultural, social, ecological or outstanding visual and aesthetic appeal". Other varieties of tree on the Register near to the university include Moreton Bay figs in Alexandria Park, Alexandria and Observatory Hill; Brush box trees in Avenue Road, Glebe; Washington palms in Farrer Place, Sydney; Plane trees on Bourke Street, Surry Hills; and Dragon's blood trees in Cook and Phillip Park.

=== Death ===
In 2016 the tree died aged approximately 77–85 years, possibly of ganoderma fungus, and fell over on 28 October. It was cut up and removed the following day. The university issued a press release reminding students that the tree had begun to bloom and wished "them all well for their final weeks of study for 2016".

== Current tree ==
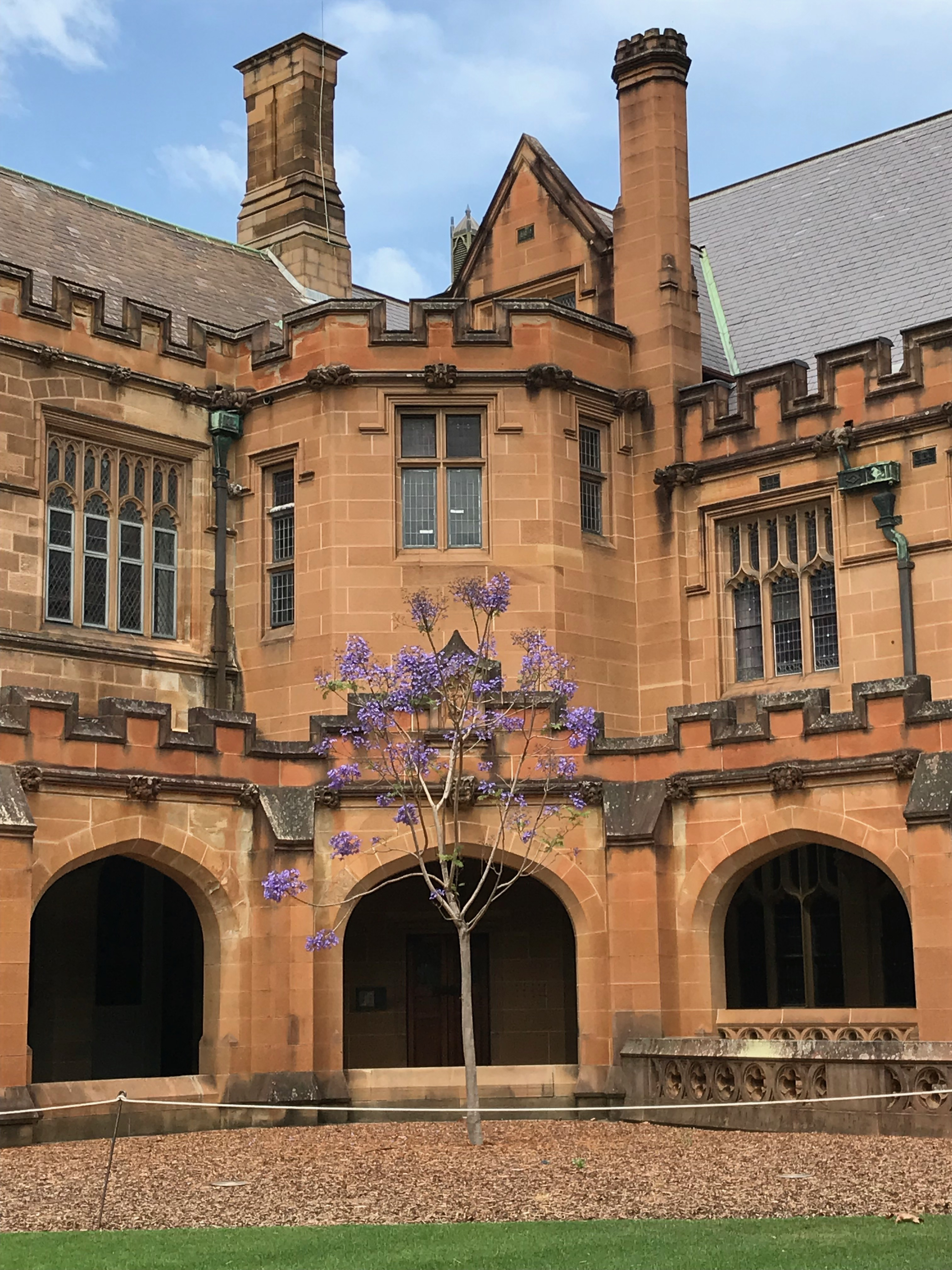
Replacement jacaranda blooming in November 2019

=== Preparations ===
The university had been advised in 2014 that the original tree was nearing the end of its life. Aware of its significance, the university administration had taken cuttings and maintained three "emergency" specimens. The resulting clones would subsequently enable it to be replaced with genetically identical stock.

=== Planting ===
In July 2017 the cloned tree was replanted; the tree is a graft from the old tree on a jacaranda rootstock. The replacement tree thrived and in the flowering season of 2019, it was blooming.

The university also planted a native flame tree alongside the replacement jacaranda in recognition of the Gadigal people on whose traditional lands the university is located. Flame trees and jacaranda trees flower around the same time of year, providing an eye-catching contrasting display of red and purple blooms.

== See also ==
- List of individual trees
- Bland Oak, a historical tree in western Sydney
