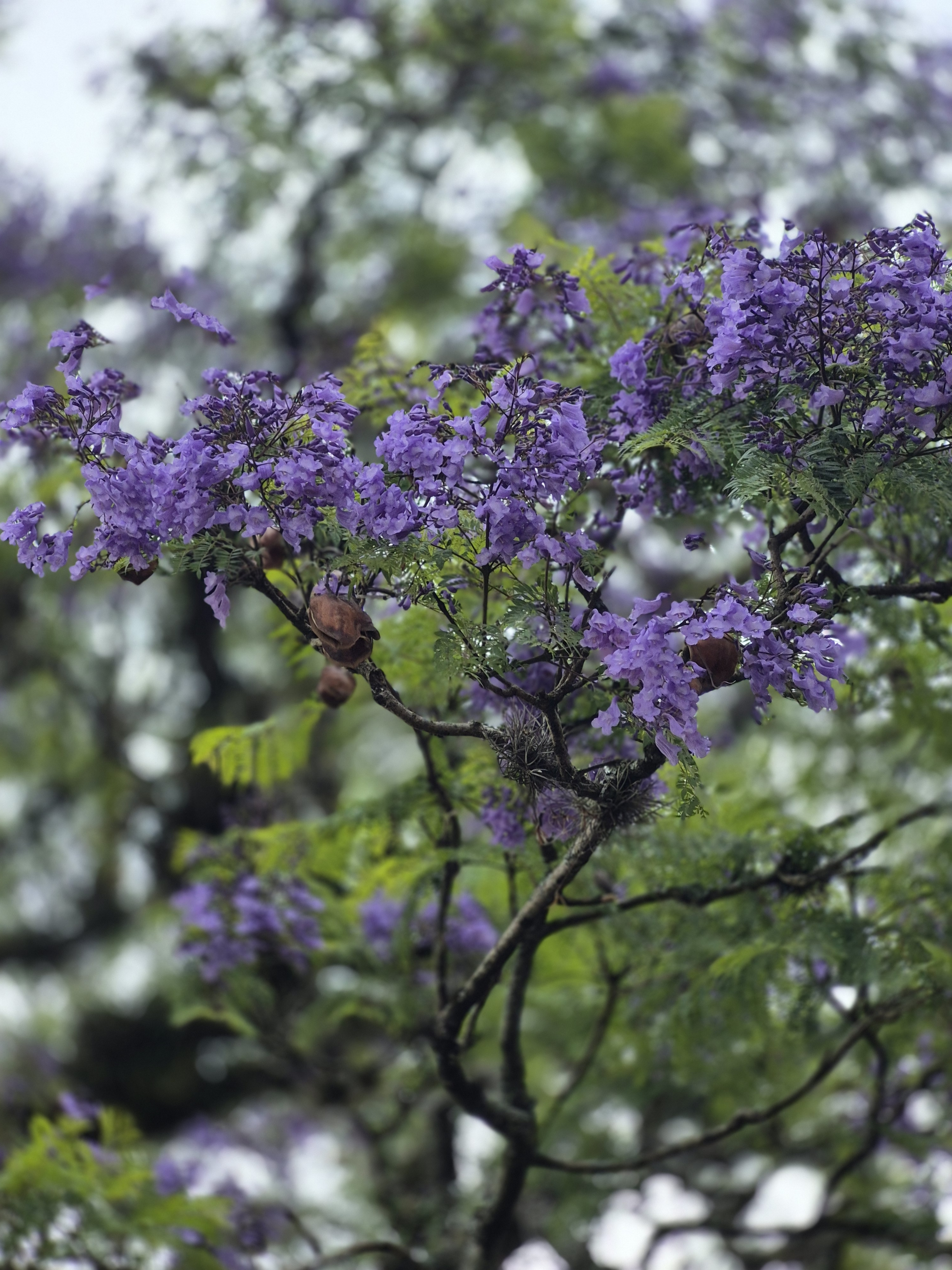

Conservation status
- Vulnerable (IUCN 3.1)

Scientific classification
- Kingdom: Plantae
- Clade: Tracheophytes
- Clade: Angiosperms
- Clade: Eudicots
- Clade: Asterids
- Order: Lamiales
- Family: Bignoniaceae
- Genus: Jacaranda
- Species: J. mimosifolia

Binomial name
- Jacaranda mimosifolia D.Don

Synonyms
- Jacaranda chelonia Griseb.; Jacaranda ovalifolia R.Br.; Jacaranda acutifolia auct. non Humb. & Bonpl.

= Jacaranda mimosifolia =

Species of sub-tropical tree

Jacaranda mimosifolia is a sub-tropical tree native to south-central South America that has been widely planted elsewhere because of its attractive and long-lasting violet-colored flowers. It is also known as the jacaranda, blue jacaranda, Nupur or black poui. Older sources call it J. acutifolia, but modern authorities usually classify it as J. mimosifolia. In scientific usage, the name "jacaranda" refers to the genus Jacaranda, which has many other members, but in horticultural and everyday usage, it nearly always means the blue jacaranda.

In its native range in the wild, J. mimosifolia is listed as Vulnerable by the IUCN.

== Description ==
The tree grows to a height of up to 20 m (66 ft). Its bark is thin, grey-brown and smooth, when the tree is young but eventually becoming finely scaly. The twigs are slender and slightly zigzag; they are a light reddish-brown, the flowers are up to 5 cm (2 in) long, and are grouped in 30 cm (12 in) panicles. They appear in spring and early summer, and last for up to two months, they are followed by woody seed pods, about 5 cm (2 in) in diameter, which contain numerous flat, winged seeds. The blue jacaranda is cultivated for the sake of its large compound leaves, even in areas where it rarely blooms. The leaves are up to 45 cm (18 in) long and bi-pinnately compound, with leaflets little more than 1 cm (0.4 in) long. There is a white form available from nurseries!

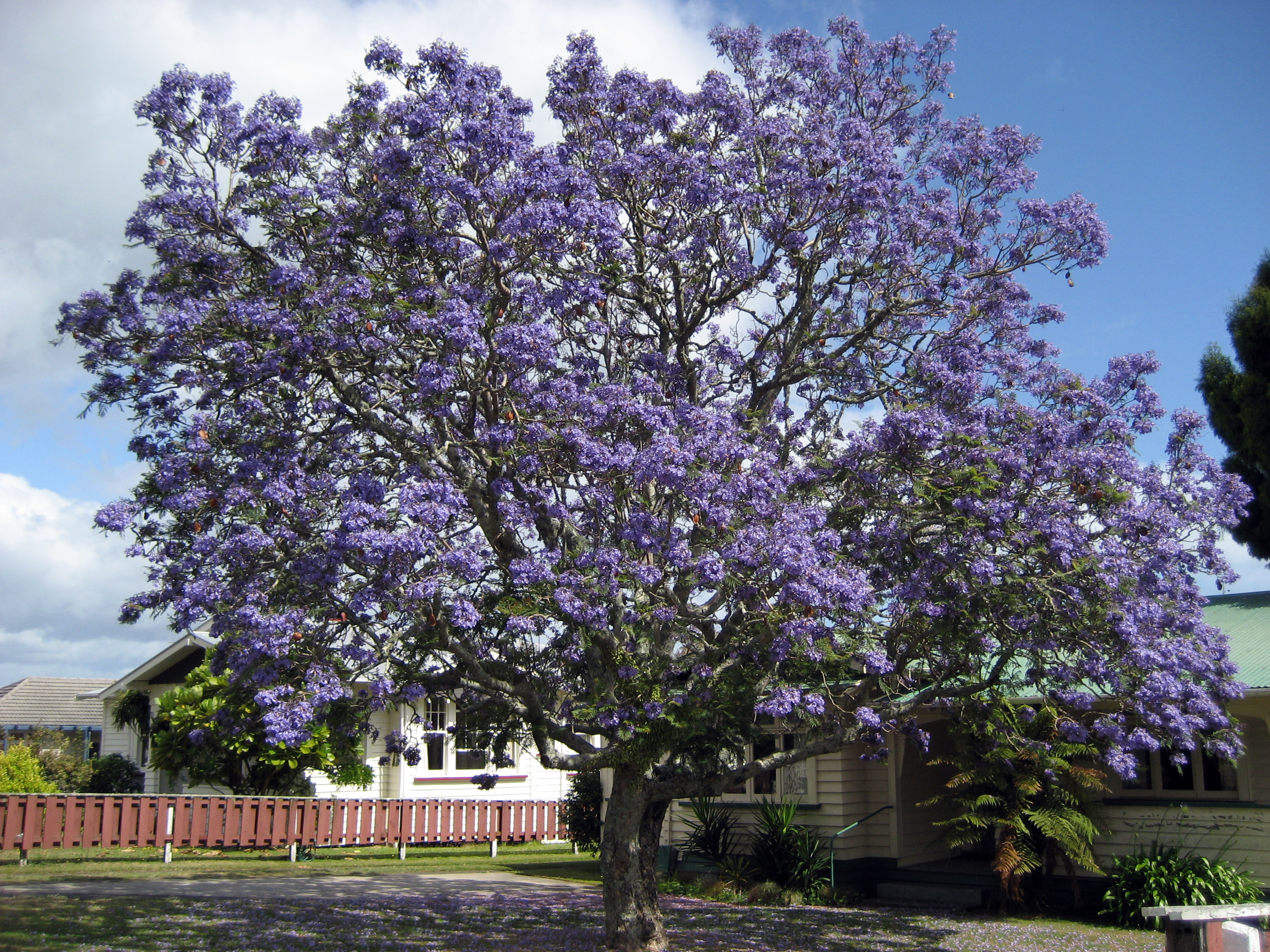
Tree in flower in Whakatāne, New Zealand

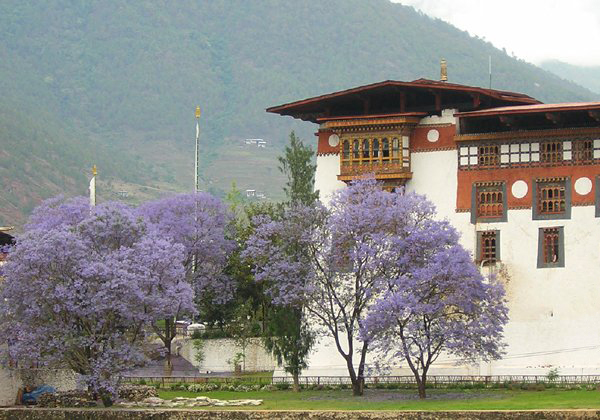
Jacaranda trees in Bhutan

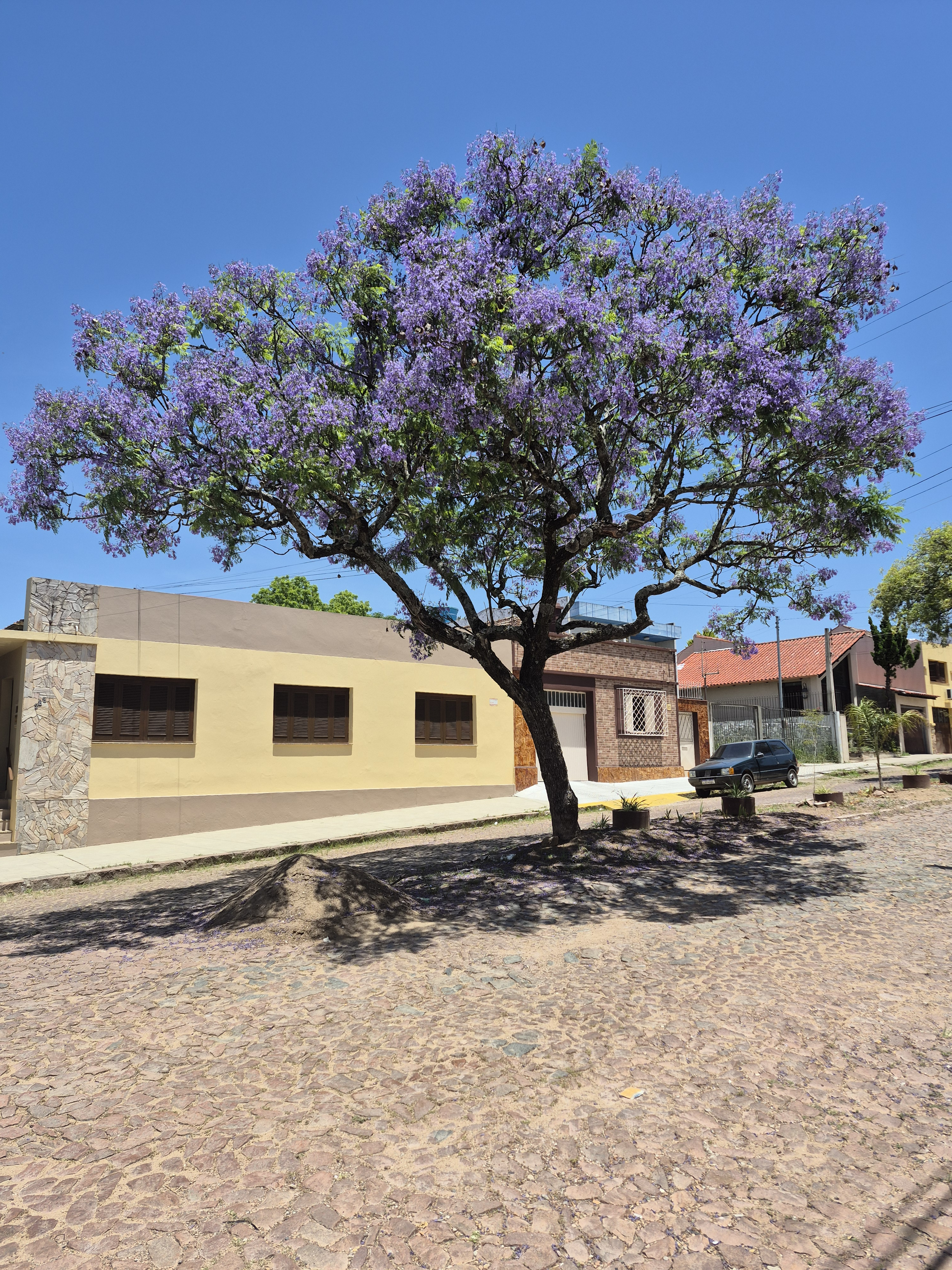
Tree in Brazil

The unusually shaped, tough pods, which are 5 to 8 cm (2 to 3 in) across, are often gathered, cleaned, and used to decorate Christmas trees and dried arrangements.

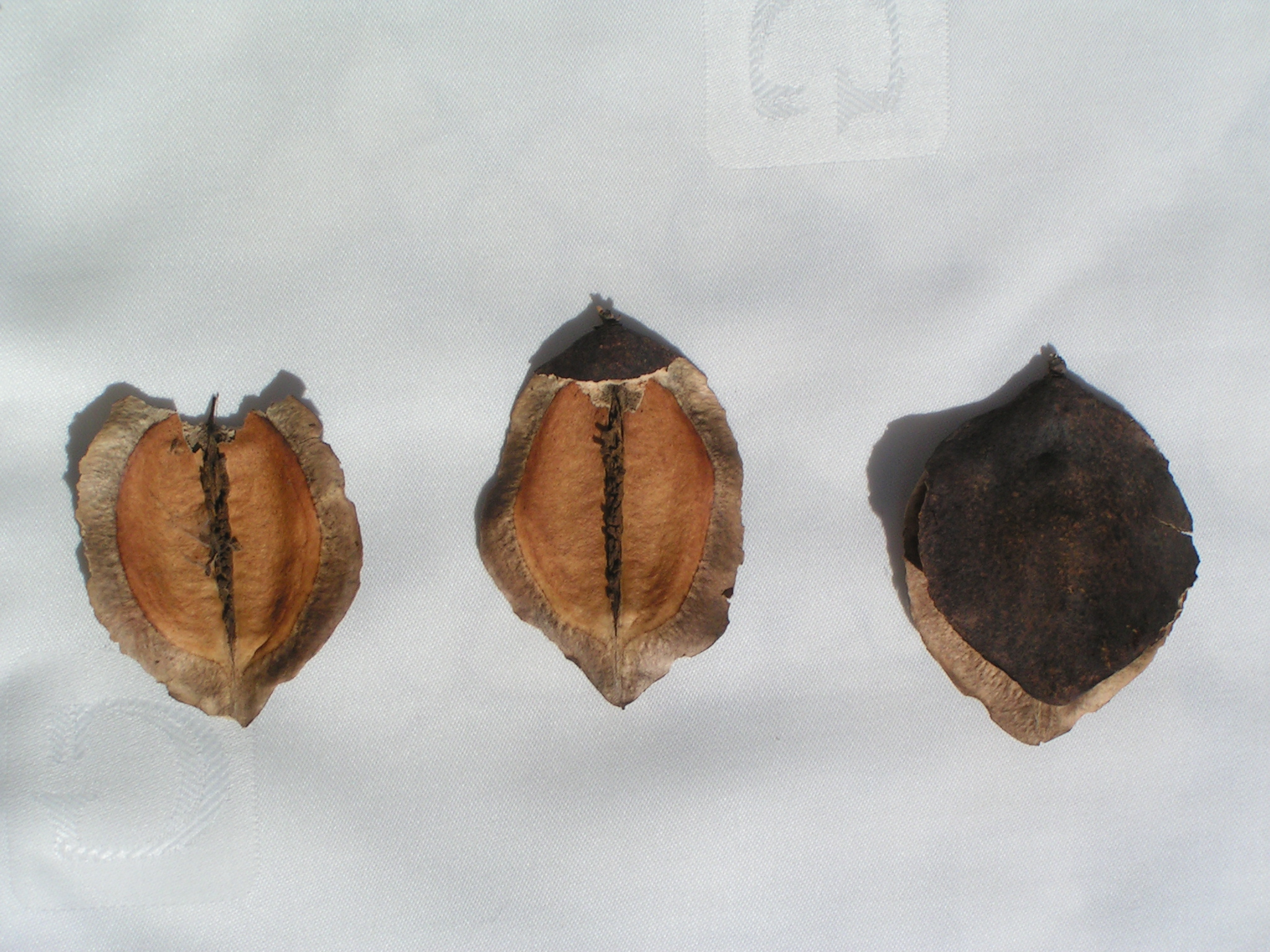
J. mimosifolia fruits

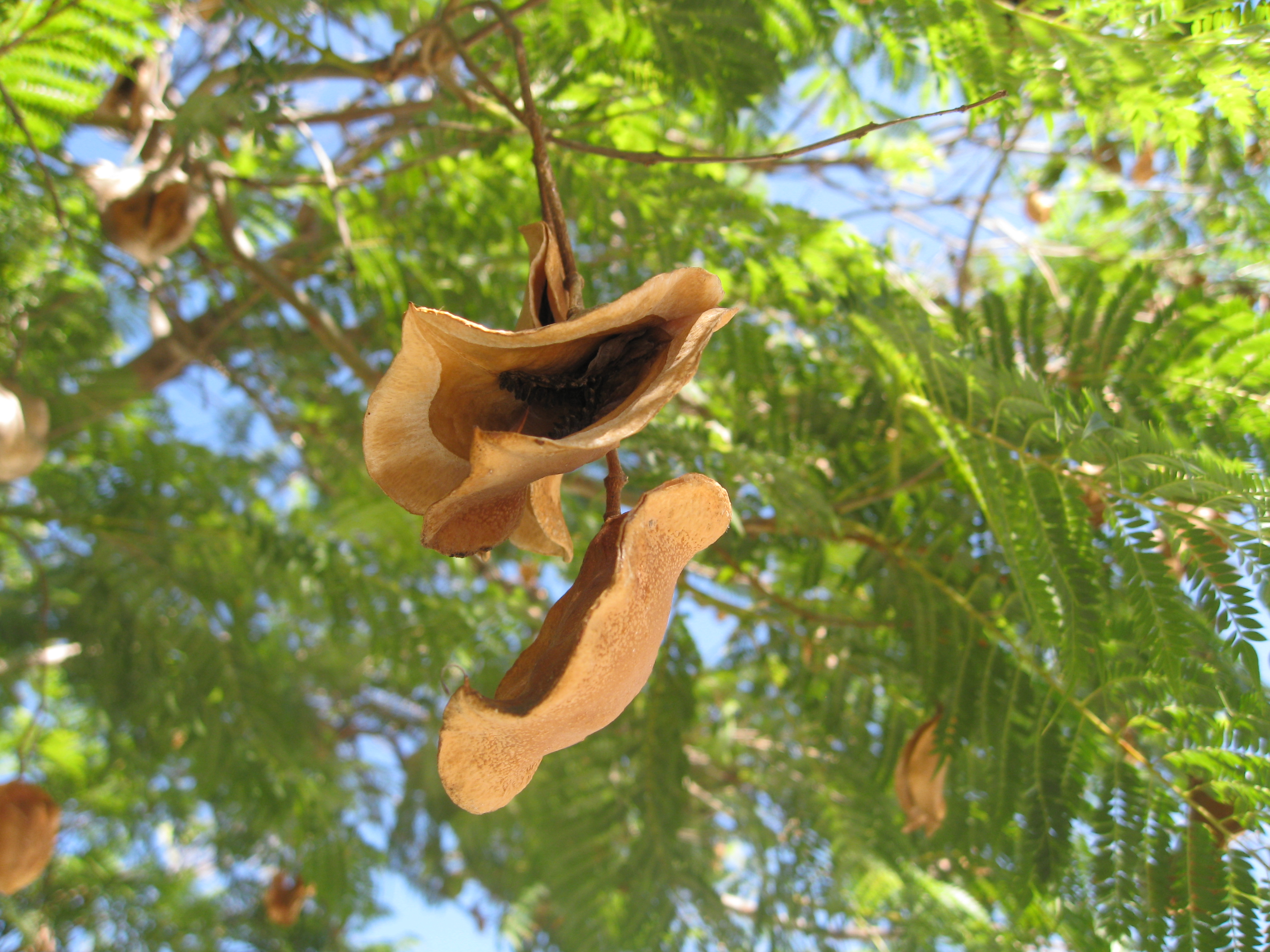
A jacaranda seed pod

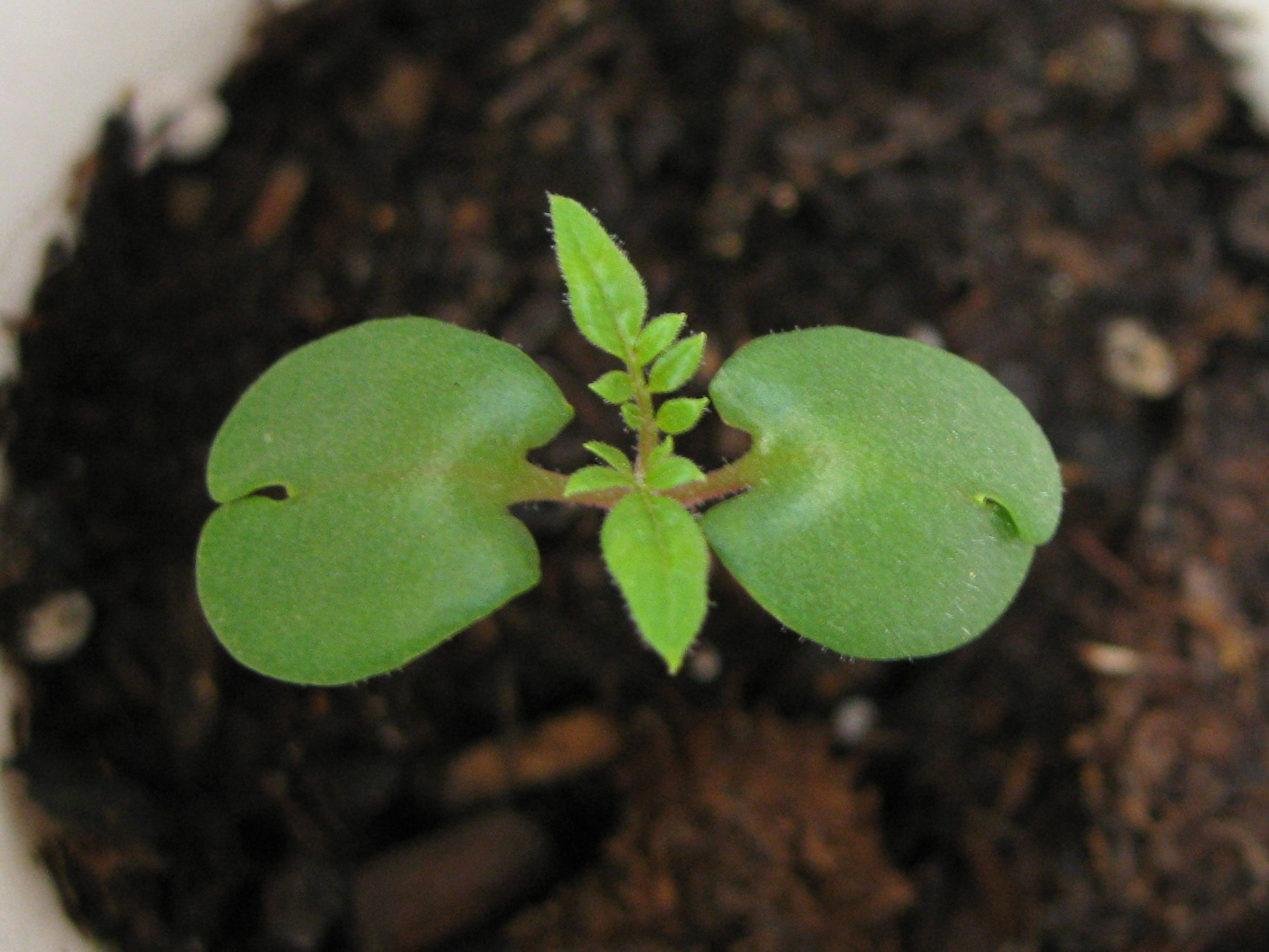
Early jacaranda sprout

== Wood ==
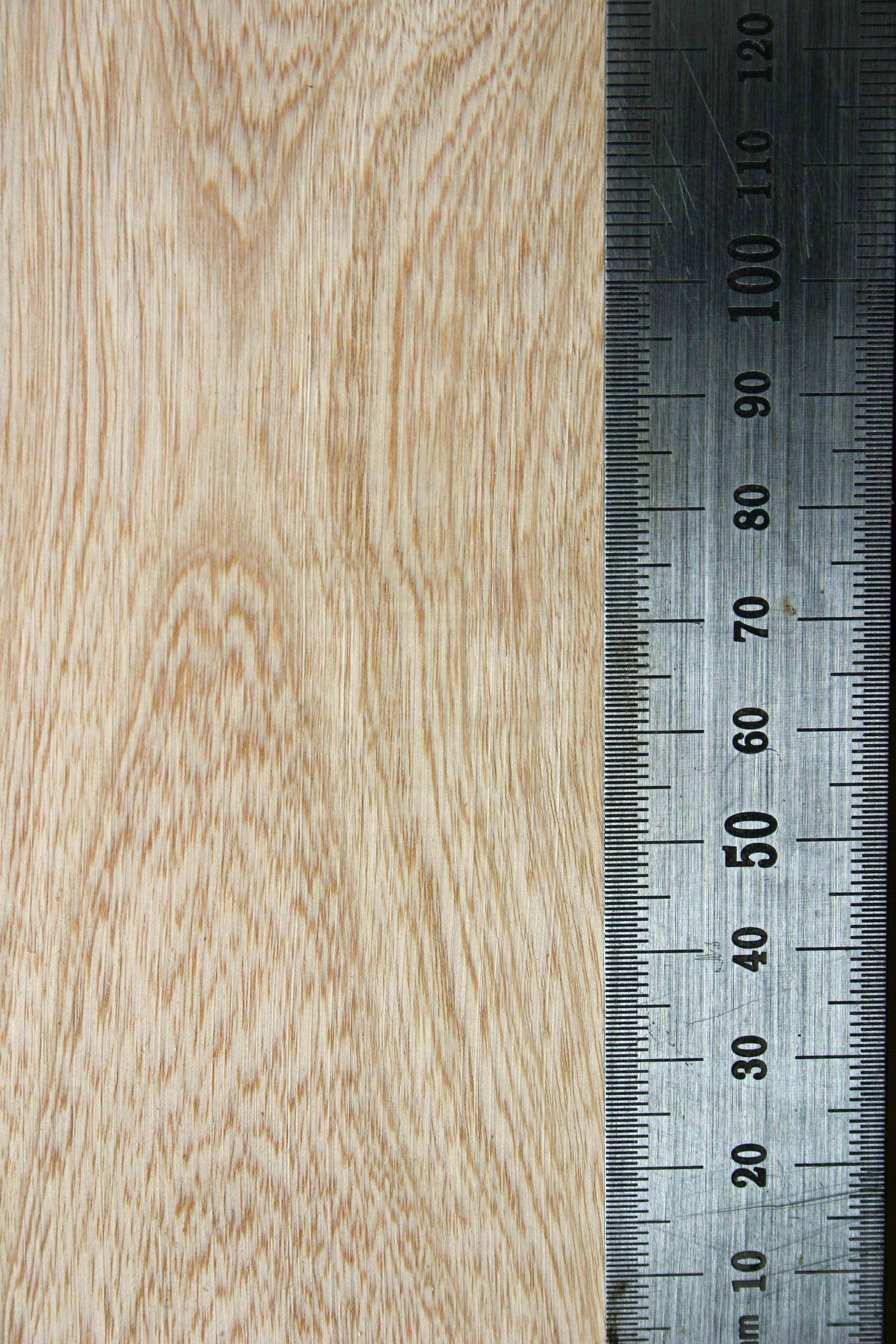
Wood

The wood is pale grey to whitish, straight-grained, relatively soft, and knot-free. It dries without difficulty and is often used in its green or wet state for turnery and bowl carving.

== Habitat and range ==
Jacaranda mimosifolia is native to southern Brazil, Uruguay, Paraguay, northern Argentina (Salta, Jujuy, Catamarca, and Misiones provinces), and southern Bolivia. It is found in the Dry Chaco and flooded savannas, and in the Southern Andean Yungas of the eastern Andean piedmont and inter-Andean valleys, up to 2600 meters elevation. In its native range, the tree is threatened by uncontrolled logging and clearing of land for agriculture, and is assessed as Vulnerable in the IUCN Red List.

The jacaranda is regarded as an invasive species in parts of South Africa, Namibia, and Queensland, Australia, where it can out-compete native species.

== Taxonomy ==
The taxonomic status of the blue jacaranda is unsettled. ITIS regards the older name, J. acutifolia, as a synonym for J. mimosifolia. However, some modern taxonomists maintain the distinction between these two species, regarding them as geographically distinct: J. acutifolia is endemic to Peru, while J. mimosifolia is native to Bolivia and Argentina. If this distinction is made, cultivated forms should be treated as J. mimosifolia, since they are believed to derive from Argentine stock. Other synonyms for the blue jacaranda are J. chelonia and J. ovalifolia. The blue jacaranda belongs to the section Monolobos of the genus Jacaranda.

== Ornamental use ==
The blue jacaranda has been cultivated in almost every part of the world where there is no risk of frost; established trees, however, tolerate brief spells of temperatures down to around −7 °C (19 °F). Even when young trees are damaged by a hard frost and suffer dieback, they will often rebound from the roots and grow in a shrub-like, multi-stemmed form. However, flowering and growth will be stunted if the jacaranda is grown directly on the California coast, where a lack of heat combined with cool ocean winds, discourages flowering.

This plant has won the Royal Horticultural Society's Award of Garden Merit.

== Cultivation ==
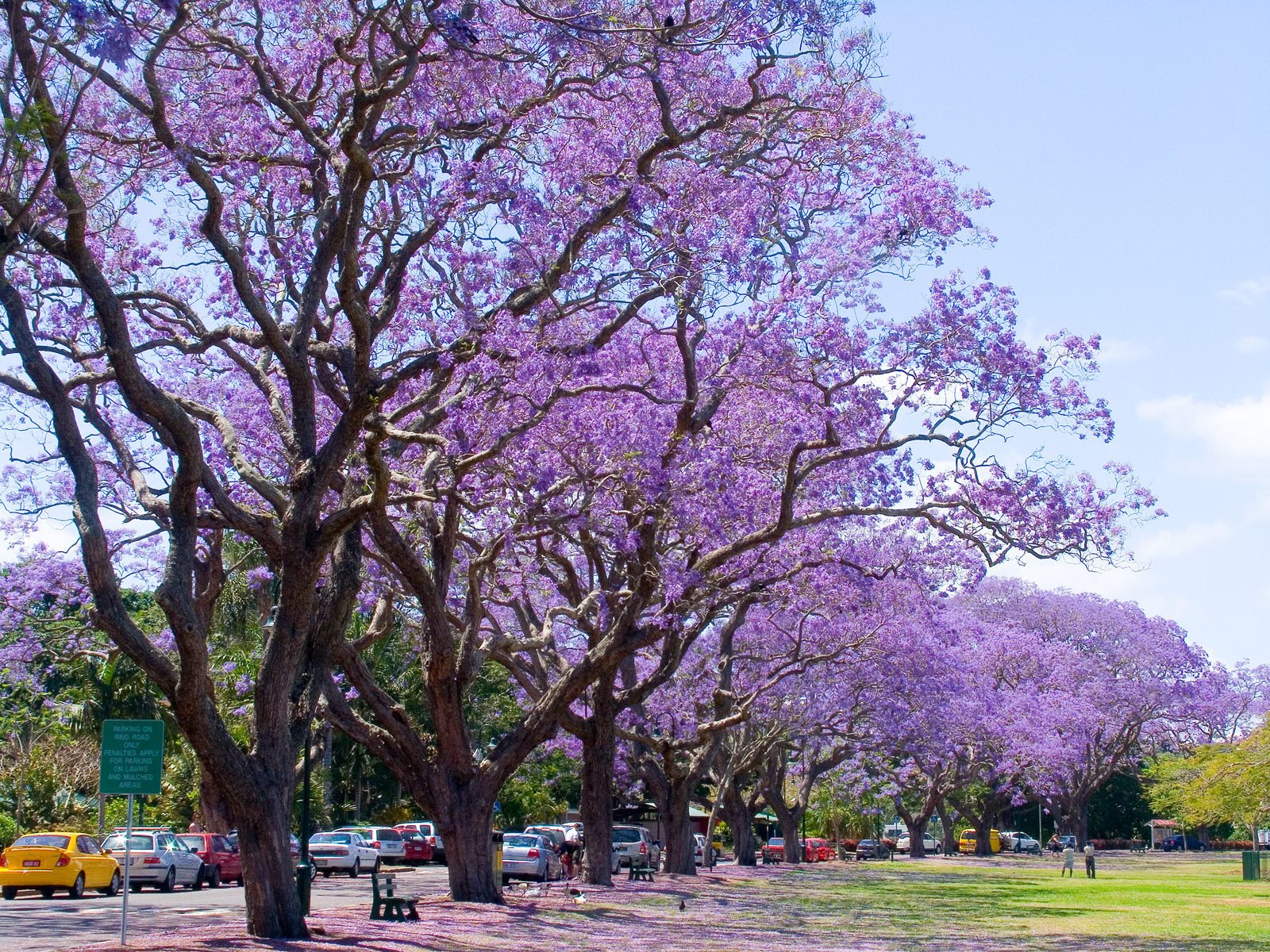
Jacarandas at New Farm Park in Brisbane, Queensland, Australia

Jacaranda trees were introduced to South Africa by Baron von Ludwig during the start of the botanical garden in Cape Town around 1829. Pretoria, the administrative capital of South Africa, is popularly known as Jacaranda City because of the large number of trees; It is estimated that Pretoria and surroundings are home to more than 65,000 of them. Jacaranda trees turn the city blue and purple when they flower in spring. The jacaranda trees, far from their native South Central South America (southern Brazil, Paraguay, northern Argentina, and southern Bolivia), bloom every October. Water scarcity has South Africa trying to eradicate foreign species of plants and trees, including the jacaranda. Acknowledging the tree's popularity with locals, the government announced in the early 2000s that it would not remove the trees, but banned the planting of new ones. By 2016, this decision was reversed, and jacarandas were again allowed to be planted in urban environments in some provinces.

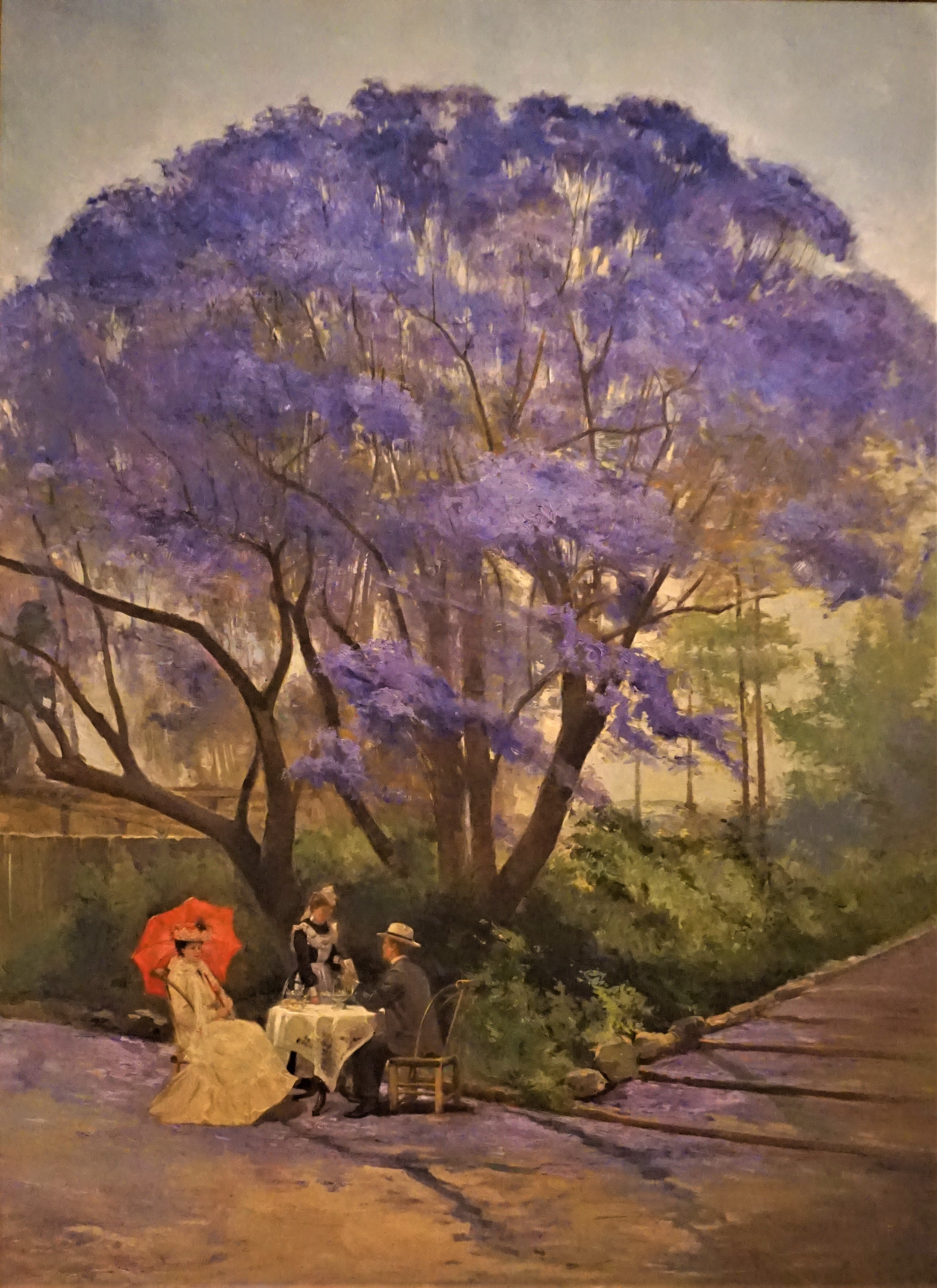
Jacaranda in City Botanic Gardens Brisbane, painted by Richard Godfrey Rivers in 1903

The first jacaranda bloomed in Sydney, Australia, in about 1850. An 1865 report mentioned that Sydneysiders were visiting the Botanic Garden to see the tree's "luxuriant blossom". This tree was over 175 years old as of 2023, and protected by ropes to prevent it from falling apart. In the early 20th Century, Margaret Fell, wife of John Fell, was significant in boosting the popularity of jacarandas. Many of the trees in the avenue of jacarandas, at Grafton, were grown from seed of the trees that she grew in the garden of the Fells' home, 'Rostrevor', at Northwood.

Jacarandas were first introduced to Brisbane in 1864, and there are guided tours of the best locations to view the flowers. The city of Grafton on the north coast of New South Wales has a jacaranda festival each year in late October and early November.

In the United States, the jacaranda is grown extensively in California, the Southwest, southeast Texas and Florida. Jacaranda can be found throughout most of Southern California, where they were imported by the horticulturalist Kate Sessions. Sessions is credited with importing and popularizing the jacaranda in San Diego. They are also planted as far north as the San Francisco Bay Area and along the frost-free coastal regions of Northern California. In San Francisco, they can only be grown in the city's warmest microclimates, such as Potrero Hill and the Mission District.

It is one of the most common trees in Argentina's capital city, Buenos Aires. Jacarandas can also be found in many parts of Mexico City and are usually in full bloom in March.

In Europe the jacaranda is grown on the Mediterranean coast of Spain (it is prominent in the Valencian Community, the Balearic Islands and Andalusia, with especially large specimens present in Valencia, Alicante and Seville, and usually with earlier flowering than in the rest of Europe), in southern Portugal (notably in Lisbon), southern Italy (Naples and Cagliari have many mature specimens), southern Greece (especially Athens) and the islands of Malta and Cyprus.

Jacarandas are also common in other cities across Southern Africa. They were introduced to Cape Town; then Johannesburg; Windhoek, Namibia; Lusaka, Zambia; Gaborone, Botswana; Nairobi, Kenya; and Harare, Zimbabwe. Beyond the region, Jacaranda are also cultivated in Kathmandu, the capital of Nepal and Maharashtra, Madhya Pradesh, Karnataka, Kerala, and Jharkhand states in India. They are also a common sight in Israel, mainly in the towns and cities of the coastal plain. As mentioned above, the trees are best associated with spring in the cities of Pretoria and Harare, the respective capitals of South Africa and Zimbabwe.

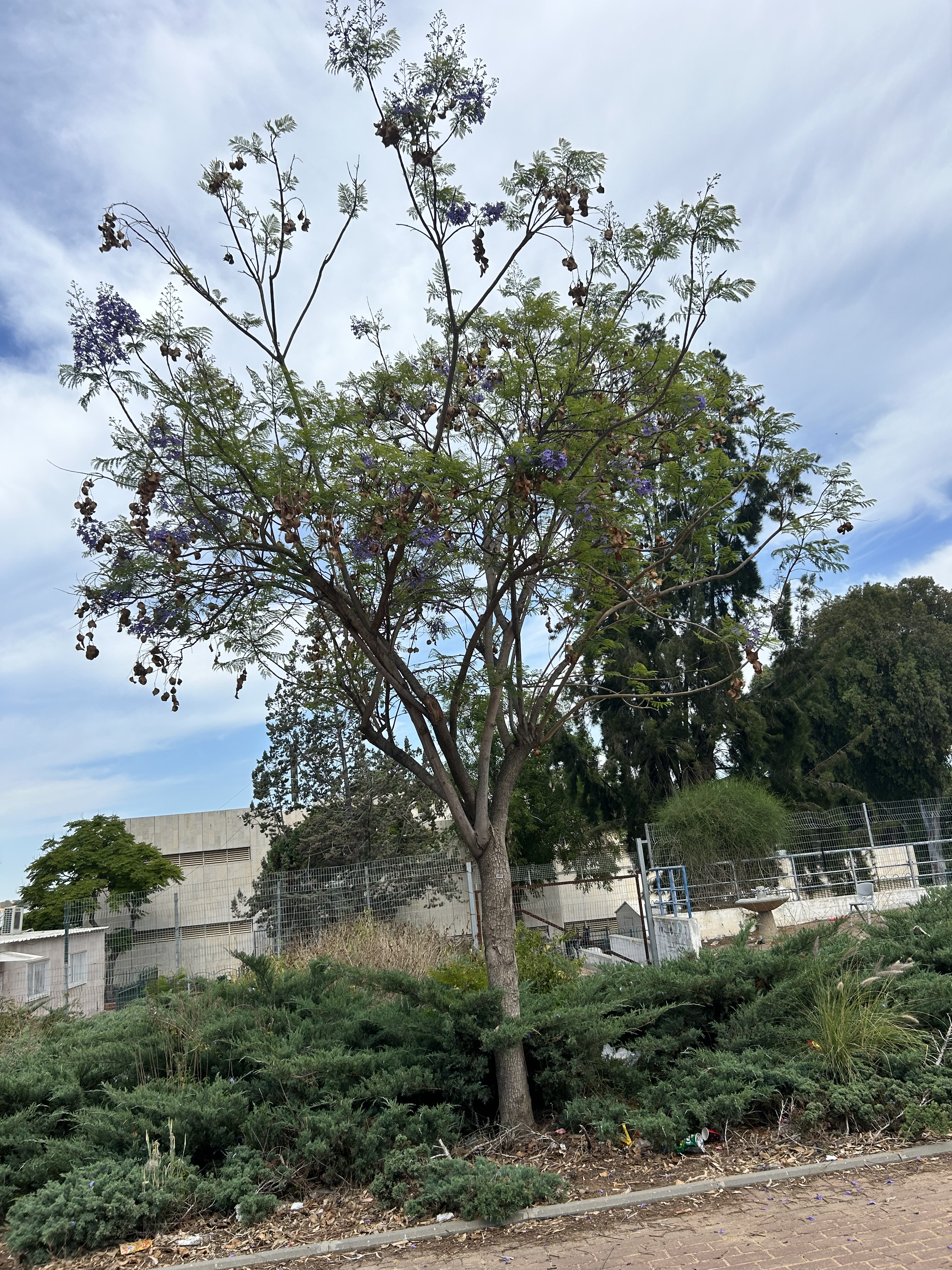
Specimen in Israel

== In popular culture ==
Jacaranda FM, a South African radio station in Midrand, is named after the Jacaranda tree.

The Australian Christmas song "Christmas Where the Gum Trees Grow" refers to jacaranda trees, as the blooms are only seen in summer time—as the song explains, "When the bloom of the jacaranda tree is here, Christmas time is near".

The movie musical Encanto, set in Colombia, references the plant in the song "What Else Can I Do". Isabela Madrigal explores her plant-summoning powers, she creates, and mentions by line, "a hurricane of jacarandas".

References to the jacaranda plant recur in the musical work of Trevor Rabin, providing the title of his 2012 solo album and also appearing in the lyrics of "I'm Running", a song which he co-wrote and performed as part of Yes and which appeared on their 1987 album Big Generator. The plant has also lent its name to his home studio, The Jacaranda Room.

In Argentina, María Elena Walsh dedicated her song "Canción del Jacarandá" to the tree. Writer Alejandro Dolina, in his book Crónicas del Ángel Gris (Chronicles of the Gray Angel), tells the legend of a massive jacarandá tree, planted in Plaza Flores in Buenos Aires, that was able to whistle tango songs on demand. Miguel Brascó's folk song "Santafesino de veras" mentions the aroma of jacarandá as a defining feature of the littoral Santa Fe Province (along with the willows growing by the rivers).

Jorge Drexler's song, "Un Lugar En Tu Almohada" mentions the tree in the line, "...Una cascada azul, Como la sombra de un jacarandá..."

=== Exam folklore ===
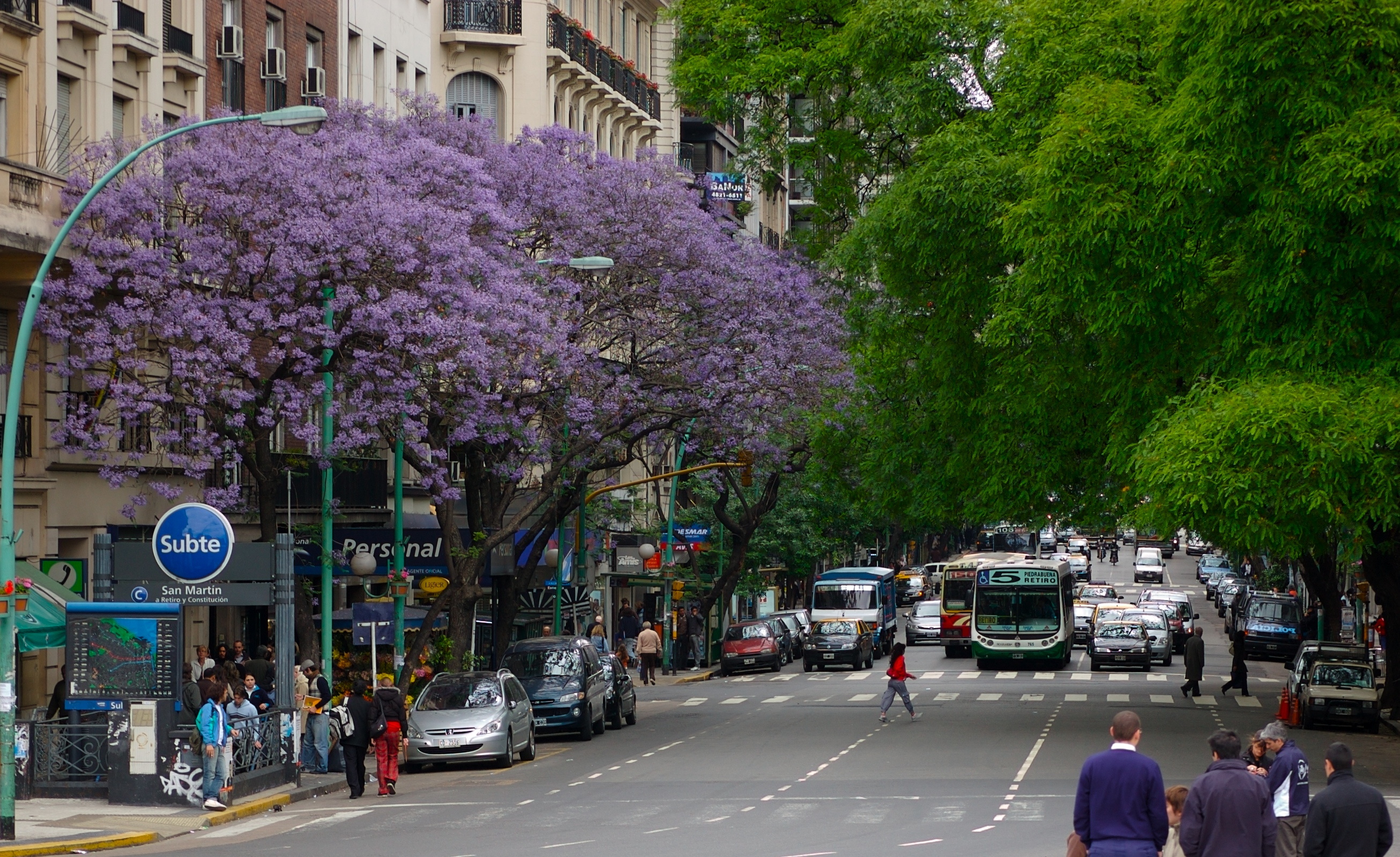
Jacarandas in Avenida Santa Fe, Buenos Aires. Its blooms were popularly associated with exam time. The tree collapsed in October 2016.

The University of Queensland in Brisbane is particularly well known for its ornamental jacarandas, and a common maxim among students holds that the blooming of the jacarandas signals the time for serious study for end-of-year exams; the jacaranda when in bloom is also known as the exam tree. Purple panic is a term used by students in south-east Queensland for student stress during the period of late spring and early summer. The "purple" refers to the flowers of Jacaranda trees, which bloom at that time and have been extensively planted throughout that district. The "panic" refers to the need to complete assignments and study for final exams.

There is a similar maxim concerning the jacaranda at the University of Sydney, in the main quadrangle, which was planted by E.G. Waterhouse in 1928.

Conversely, while the time of year the jacarandas bloom in Pretoria coincides with the year-end exams at the University of Pretoria, legend has it that if a flower from a jacaranda drops on a student's head, the student will pass all their exams.
