= John Goodlet =

Scottish-born Australian timber merchant and philanthropist

John Hay Goodlet (22 March 1835 – 13 January 1914) was a Scottish-born Australian timber merchant and philanthropist.

== Life ==
Goodlet was born in Leith to merchant George Goodlet and Mary Hay. He migrated to Melbourne in 1852, working for a building firm until 1855, when he moved to Sydney. He imported timber from Jervis Bay, and entered a partnership with James Smith in 1859. On 3 May 1860 he married Ann Dickson, who would go on to be the third president of the Young Women's Christian Association's Australian branch in 1886. She was also the first President of the Presbyterian Women's Missionary Association when it was created by 1891. John Goodlet had a sawmill in Erskine Street and later a brickworks at Granville, a pottery in Surry Hills and two further mills. He was twice chairman of the Australian Mutual Provident Society, and was a railway commissioner from 1890 to 1891. He was also a lieutenant-colonel in the militia.

Goodlet survived the 1893 bank crash with difficulty, but had recovered well and became known for charitable donations, including Sydney Hospital, the Benevolent Society and, most significantly, the Presbyterian church. He was a New South Wales representative at the General Assembly of the Presbyterian Churches and at the 1910 World Missionary Conference. His wife died in 1903 and on 3 February 1904 he married an enthusiastic Presbyterian named Elizabeth Mary Forbes who was the secretary of the Presbyterian Women's Missionary Association when his first wife was president. Goodlet died, childless, in 1914. His nephew, Alfred Ingram Macfarlan (1861–1929), had come from Glasgow to join the business in 1900, serving as secretary for many years.
