= John Fell (industrialist) =

Scottish-born Australian industrialist

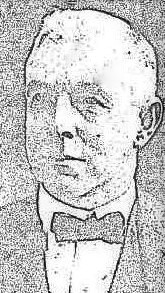
John Fell c.1917.

John Wilson Fell (1862–1955) was an industrialist involved in the shale oil operations at Newnes, New South Wales and the establishment of two early oil refineries, on Gore Bay at Greenwich and at Clyde, both suburbs of Sydney. He was the principal of John Fell & Company and was, for many years, the Managing Director of Commonwealth Oil Corporation, which he revived from receivership.

== Early life and family background ==
John Wilson Fell was born at Livingston, West Lothian, Scotland. on 7 November 1862. He was the son of Alexander Morrison Fell, Senior (1825–1890) and his wife Margaret (née Ferguson) (1828–1901) He migrated to Australia, with his parents during the 1870s.

Alexander Morrison Fell, Senior, was an important figure in the Scottish shale oil industry, at the time the most advanced and largest in the world. In 1860, contributing shale mining leasehold in lieu of capital, Alexander had become a partner in the West Calder Oil Company, and its manager. The company’s works was known as the ‘Gavieside Oil Works’, or ‘Fell’s Works’ after its manager. However, there was disharmony among the partners and an unsuccessful court case, with the end result being that Alexander was made bankrupt in 1873. Alexander subsequently migrated, with his family, to New South Wales.

During Fell's youth, after his migration to New South Wales, his father was already an important figure in the local oil shale industry; first at Mount Kembla, where he was manager for the American Creek Oil Co., until 1877, and later at Joadja, where he was manager, from 1877 to 1881, for the Australian Kerosene Oil and Mineral Co.

John Fell’s cousin, James Walter Fell (1847–1882) was almost certainly the first of the extended Fell family to migrate to Australia. James was also involved in the shale oil industry, both in Scotland and in New South Wales. He was manager of the Western Kerosene Oil Co. at Hartley Vale, by 1870, then manager of Hartley Vale's refinery at Waterloo, and later was at Joadja. Like his uncle, Alexander, James was an expert in the field of shale oil processing; both men had worked together, at the West Calder Oil Company, in Scotland, and later at Joadja. With T.S. Mort, James was pivotal in the amalgamation of two shale oil companies—Hartley Kerosene Oil and Paraffine Co. Ltd. and Western Kerosene Oil Co.—to form the New South Wales Shale & Oil Company, in 1872. Aside from his role in the shale oil industry, James Fell was a founder of the North Shore Gas Company in Sydney. James had acted as an engineer for other gasworks—including Australian Gas Light Company—and retained a business interest in the gasworks at Goulburn. In 1870, James married Helen Wilson Thomson (1849–1935), who under her married name, Helen Wilson Fell, became a philanthropist and diarist. James died at only 35, already a wealthy man, while visiting London on business, and his only son, John Walter Fell (1872–1891) also died young, at only 18 years old.

Fell was also a cousin of William Scott Fell (1866–1930), principal of Scott Fell & Company—with interests in coastal shipping and coal mining—and politician, and his younger brother David Fell (1869–1956), an accountant and politician. Fell was related to them via their father, also named John Wilson Fell (1820–1879), a ship’s captain, who was an older brother of Alexander Morrison Fell, Senior. After the death of the elder John Wilson Fell, his widow, Jessie Fell (née Power) (1845–1937), remarried, in Sydney. However, her new husband already had a wife in England, who then sued her husband successfully for divorce, but found he was, by then, insolvent.

== Career ==
=== Early business career ===
By 1885, under a lease agreement with the N.S.W. Shale & Oil Company, his father's family company, A.M. Fell and Sons, was running an oil refining business at Waterloo (sometimes mentioned as Alexandria) in Sydney, processing crude oil, which had been produced in retorts that A.M. Fell and Sons also ran at Hartley Vale. The Waterloo refinery was closed around 1887, and the refining operation was relocated to Hartley Vale. The company had an oil works—for container filling and distribution—at Darling Harbour, by 1891.

There was a court case, involving the company, in 1889; John Wilson Fell was nominated as a plaintiff, and so was by then already a partner in his father's company. He gave evidence for at least one day. Under the settlement A.M. Fell and Sons role at Hartley Vale ended. Fell's father died in 1890.

By the time of his father’s probate in 1891, John Wilson Fell was described as an ‘oil and grease manufacturer’. Fell, with his brother Alexander Morrison Fell, Junior—also described as an ‘oil and grease manufacturer’—carried on his father’s business interests. Another brother, Walter John Fell (d.1938), was also a partner but, in 1891, was described as a 'fruit grower' and so almost certainly was only a silent partner in the business at that time.

Fell spent some time outside the oil industry, while involved in setting up two plants for the production of condensed milk, in the Shoalhaven region of New South Wales, at Bomaderry and Coolangatta Estate. Based upon the birth locations of two of his children, he was living in the Shoalhaven district, during the period 1897-1901. His brother, Walter John Fell, was also involved in the condensed milk industry, at Berry. In May 1901, Fell stood down, as Managing Director of the Jersey Milk Company Limited, and was succeeded by his brother Walter. The family left the Shoalhaven area, around the end of July 1901. Fell was now free to reenter the family business.

His brother, Alexander Morrison Fell, Junior, died in 1904. In the meantime, in 1902, Fell had either set up his own company, John Fell & Company, or more likely had renamed A. M. Fell & Sons to use that new name. In mid 1903, he attempted to convince ferry companies operating on Sydney Harbour to convert coal-burning steam ferries burn oil using an oil burner design that he had patented, by providing a demonstration aboard Lady Napier. It was a technical success, but observers noted the "continuous noise" generated by the oil burner.

Fell's business involved importing oil; for that reason, in 1914, he opposed the payment of a two pence bonus payment—50% of the prevailing price—on each imperial gallon of locally-produced crude shale oil, which was being advocated by British Australian Oil Company and Fell's cousin, David Fell, as receiver for Commonwealth Oil Corporation's debenture holders. Neither of these ventures had been able to operate profitably. British Australian Oil, would be in receivership, by the end of 1914, and it ceased production entirely, in March 1915. By the end of 1914, Fell himself would be in charge of Commonwealth Oil Corporation's operations.

=== Shale oil ===
==== Newnes ====
The Commonwealth Oil Corporation had made a major investment in the production of shale oil at a site in the Wolgan Valley that they named Newnes, after Sir George Newnes, a director and chairman of the company. A large amount of English capital—around £1,250,000—had been invested to create a vast industrial complex, in what previously had been a near wilderness. They built a railway into the isolated valley, and a sizable mining village grew in the valley.

Fell was on record as saying that the investment in Newnes had been "extraordinarily wasteful" and that it would never be possible to recoup that investment in profits.

Although the oil shale at Newnes had a very high oil content, its seam thickness and depth dictated that it was mined using relatively-costly, conventional, underground mining techniques. There was also a coal seam that could be mined to fuel the processing the shale and crude oil. The coal was of good quality and was also used to make coke. Ammonia was produced as a byproduct of the shale retorts and would be treated with sulphuric acid to produce ammonium sulphate, which could sold as a fertiliser.

Construction of the plant had begun in 1906, but the retorts only began working in June 1911. The company encountered technical difficulties with its process and, as well, was subject to numerous and protracted industrial disputes with its workforce, particularly its miners. Retort operation was partially suspended in February 1912 and ceased altogether in March 1913. The retorts had operated for less than two years. Commonwealth Oil Corporation Ltd. was placed into receivership, in December 1912, and the receiver was accountant and auditor, David Fell, John Fell's cousin.

Fell was an acknowledged expert in the processing of oil, and it was during a visit made by him to England that the COC approached him to assist in rectifying the problems at Newnes. The retorts that the COC used were designed to process Scottish shale, with a far lower oil content that the very rich shale—grading up to 150 imperial gallons per long ton—mined at Newnes. The result was that the retorts at Newnes clogged up with carbon compounds and would not work properly. Fell became interested in taking over the ailing business, but first constructed four retorts to his own design to prove that the oil-rich shale could be processed successfully.

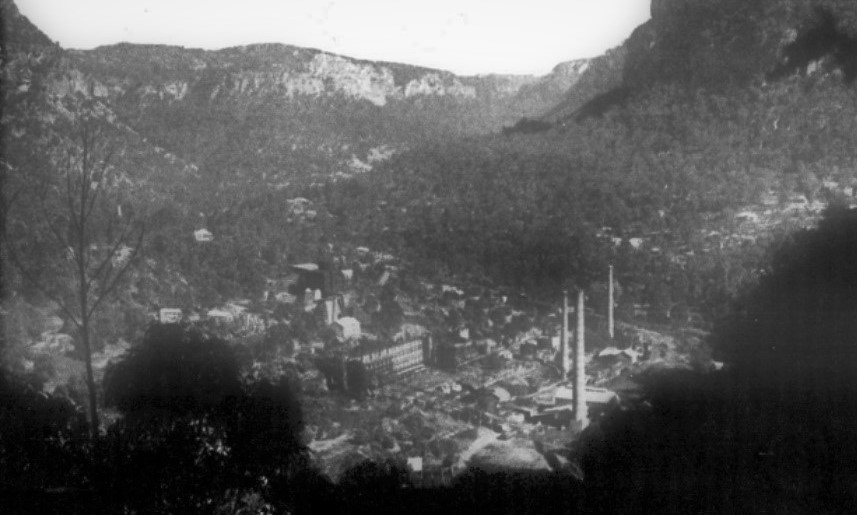
Shale oil extraction plant at Newnes. The retorts are in the centre.

==== Taking over Newnes ====
Under an agreement with the receiver of Commonwealth Oil Corporation, Fell took over the administration of the business in late 1914, with plans to produce ‘benzine’ (petrol) as fuel for motor cars, as well as kerosene, lubricants, and other petroleum products. He took the position of Managing Director of Commonwealth Oil Corporation. He sold some existing business interests, and contributed £100,000 himself to a total capital injection of £350,000 that funded necessary enhancements, including the conversion of 64 existing retorts to his own design. Fell's cousin, David Fell, was replaced as receiver in May 1914.

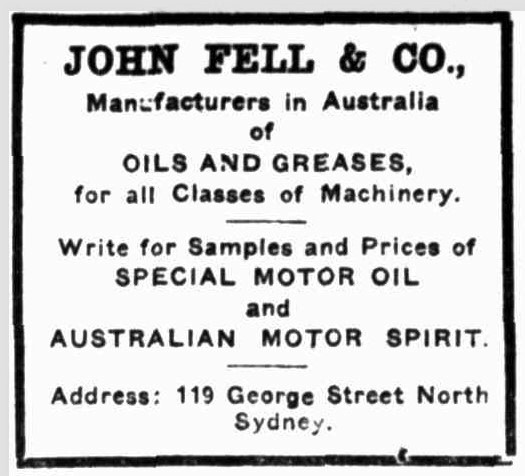
Advertisement of Australian-made 'motor spirit' (petrol), May 1917.

Fell's modifications reused the original retorts–a Scottish design known as a Pumpherson retort–but added more off takes, allowing the modified design to handle the oil-rich shale at Newnes. Fell patented this retort design, which was referred to variously as ‘modified Pumpherson’, ‘Fell Retort’, or ‘Fell Downcomer Retort’.

From 1915 to 1918, the oil refinery at Hartley Vale was dismantled and the parts reused at Newnes.

Between March 1915 and October 1917, the Newnes plant produced 3,017,163 gallons of oil. As well, Fell succeeded in making, in commercial quantities, locally-refined petrol for motor cars, at Newnes, around 1917, although some petrol had been made by the Commonwealth Oil Company as early as 1910, probably at its Hartley Vale refinery, and by the British Australian Oil Company at Hamilton from 1912 to 1915. It is likely that the petrol was made from volatile 'naphtha' fractions that had been flared, as waste, in earlier shale extraction operations.

In July 1919, an agreement was entered into, between Fell and Commonwealth Oil Company, providing for Fell to work the property, for the joint account of the company and himself, until October 1929. The arrangement was subject to earlier termination, with a year's notice from either party, if the result for any year was a loss.

By 1921, the population of Newnes had reached around 1,500, and the Newnes plant was capable of producing 15,000,000 gallons of crude oil and 1,000,000 gallons of motor spirit annually, however the plant operated below its nominal capacity.

==== Hartley Vale ====
Commonwealth Oil Corporation had also owned what was, after 1910, solely an oil refining operation, at Hartley Vale. It had been closed down in August 1913. It appears to have reopened briefly, before closing down completely in May 1914. Fell did not reopen the refinery, after taking over the administration of COC in late 1914. However, he did remove from Hartley Vale some storage tanks—relocated to his lubricating oil refinery at Gore Bay (Sydney)—and pipework that was destined for Newnes. All refining of the crude oil from Newnes and Torbane was subsequently at either Newnes or Gore Bay, dooming the small community of Hartley Vale.

==== Torbane ====
Commonwealth Oil Corporation had also owned a smaller mining and retorting operation, at Torbane, which had been closed down in 1913. The company, under Fell's management, reopened this operation, from 1916 to 1918, for what would be the last crude oil production at that site. It is likely that this production was facilitated by the government subsidies paid for local oil production in wartime. In 1920, it was on Fell's decision that most of the buildings in the Torbane township were pulled down and relocated to Newnes.

==== Competition from imported oil and bulk shipping ====
By the first decade of the 20th century, Australia imported a large proportion of its petroleum as finished product, increasingly fuel for motor cars. Some of the petroleum products still came in tinplate drums in wooden crates; in this form it was known as 'case oil’, and that came mainly from the United States.

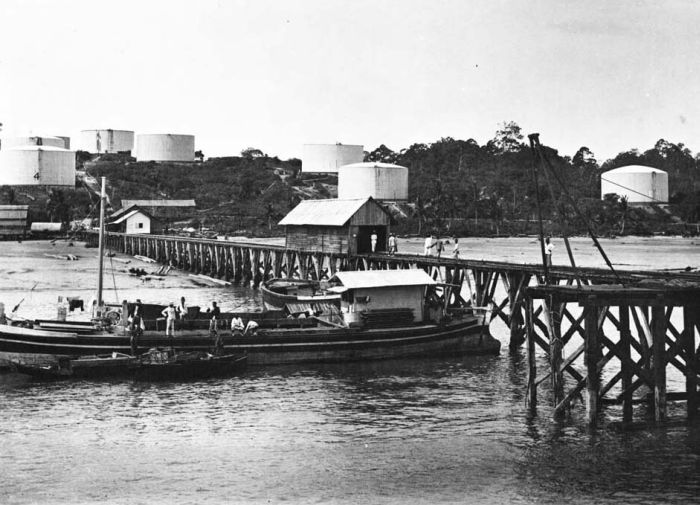
Oil tanks and pier at Tarakan,

In 1897, a small refinery company, Mathilda, began oil drilling at Balikpapan in the Dutch-ruled part of the island of Borneo. Balikpapan became a major oilfield and refining site. In 1906, Koninklijke Nederlandsche Petroleum Maatschappij began production of crude oil at Tarakan, an island that was also part of the Dutch-ruled part of Borneo. The company merged with a British rival, Shell Transport and Trading Company, to become Royal Dutch Shell, in April 1907. In December 1910, Shell struck oil with their first drill hole, on a rich oilfield at Miri, in Sarawak, also on the island of Borneo. That first oil well would flow until October 1972. In 1914, Shell established a refinery at Miri, relocated to nearby Lutong in 1916. That then meant refined petroleum products for the Australian market could be made with Borneo crude oil, or even shipped in refined form from a refinery much closer to Australia than previously. The Borneo crude was a light crude, ideal for the production of paraffin and fuel for motor cars, and was cheaper to produce than crude shale oil.

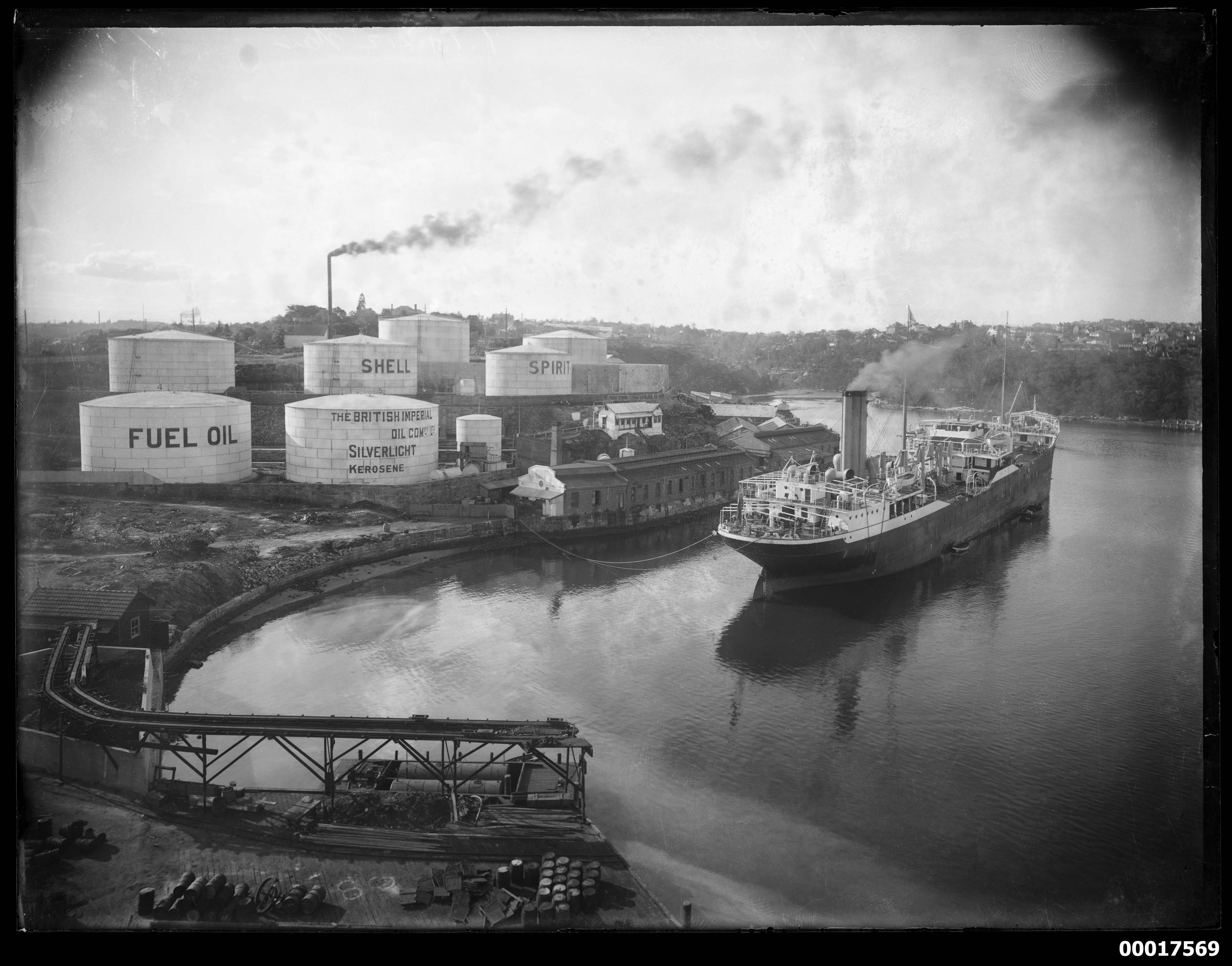
Shell oil terminal, Gore Bay, Sydney Harbour. (c.1920s).

British Imperial Oil Company Limited (part of Shell) had bought land—adjacent to what would later be the site of the John Fell & Co. refinery—at Gore Bay, Greenwich, as an import terminal. Shell were landing petroleum there, in bulk, from around 1901. In 1909, they had landed a record cargo of 500,000 imperial gallons of ‘motor spirit’ from one of their bulk tankers. In 1902, the duty on imported kerosene was removed.

Eventually, other companies, such as Vacuum Oil, built bulk terminals in Sydney too, recognising after several maritime disasters (such as the loss of SS Canastota) that ‘case oil’ was inherently dangerous. Bulk shipment of petroleum was not only far cheaper but much safer.

In 1920, Commonwealth Oil Refineries, a joint venture between the Commonwealth of Australia and the Anglo-Persian Oil Company, was established. In 1924, it opened a modern oil refinery near Laverton, Victoria. It made use of crude oil from the vast deposits that had been discovered in Iran in 1908. COR also opened a tanker berth and storage facility at Berrys Bay on Sydney Harbour, where it could discharge Australian-refined petroleum products that were destined for the Sydney and New South Wales markets.

The timing of these developments, some of global significance, could not have been worse for shale oil operations at Newnes. Moreover, the conventional crude oil from Borneo was not subject to an import tariff, and there was no protection of local crude oil production.

==== Labour problems, in-situ extraction experiment, and final closure ====
The Newnes plant was still not operating to its full capacity in March 1917, at least partially due to a lack of ‘efficient labour’, despite pay rises having been given. During the First World War, the Commonwealth Government paid a subsidy in the form of a bonus amount on each gallon of oil produced.

From the perspective of an oil refiner in Australia, increasing labour costs were making crude oil made from shale uncompetitive with imported crude oil from Borneo. Fell was later to claim that between 1912 and 1923, the cost of mining the shale at Newnes rose by 400%, “due to abnormal labour conditions.” The implications of such cost increases, combined with the rapidly increasing supplies of conventional crude oil, put shale oil production in jeopardy.

The cost of mining was not the only issue; industrial disputes, led by radical mining union leadership, disrupted production under Fell much as it had done under the earlier management of Commonwealth Oil Corporation. There seemed to be little concern from the union leadership about the precarious financial position of the Newnes operations; in fairness to the miners, mining the narrow seams of shale was difficult and hazardous. Fell himself may have contributed to the disharmony, as a hard-nosed businessman, whose personality was described as "volatile".

Fell first attempted to reduce the cost of producing crude oil from shale by experimenting with in-situ extraction, without mining the shale or using retorts. He had some success, in 1921. To improve the economics of in-situ extraction, he envisaged using the oil shale gas that was generated, as a fuel to generate electricity. Even as late as 1924, Fell was still hopeful that in-situ extraction might make Newnes shale oil economic. However, such ambitions for in-situ extraction were well ahead of technologies available at the time. From an environmental perspective, it is probably best that these attempts—basically setting alight the shale seam, under somewhat controlled conditions—were not pursued further.

Eventually, Fell realised that he would need to stop making crude oil at Newnes and planned to use the Newnes refinery to process imported crude oil. He planned to close down the shale mining and retorting operations, but would continue coal mining to provide fuel for the refining operation.

Shale mining ceased in January 1923, resulting in the retorts also closing down. Borneo crude oil was landed in Sydney and sent by rail to Newnes, where it was refined and then sent again by rail to market. The coal miners at Newnes refused to work, unless the shale mine reopened and declared the works 'black'. Fell had little choice but to shut the remaining oil refining operations at Newnes, on 22 February 1924, with the loss of 80 jobs. Fell left soon afterwards for England to consult the debenture holders of the Commonwealth Oil Company over the future of Newnes.

At the beginning of 1925, the population of Newnes had fallen to around 150, and many shops and houses were deserted. Later in 1925, Fell would build a new refinery at Clyde, in Sydney, and would reuse some material and equipment from COC assets, at Newnes and Torbane, in its construction. By March 1926, the railway line was no longer needed to remove materials and equipment, and all services on it ceased. Fell laid off the few remaining men who were maintaining the railway line. In August 1927, Fell, as mortgagee, put the Commonwealth Oil Company's assets at Newnes, Newnes Junction, and Hartley Vale, up for sale, by tender, in one lot; it seems that there was no sale at the time.

Fell was later to blame the cost of mining the shale as a major factor in the demise of Newnes. He also held the unions responsible for not doing more to support the venture, when it was still a going concern. He was quoted as saying, in 1922, during one of the later of the many industrial disputes, “I leave this valley with nothing, the miners have got the lot, including my investment in the enterprise out of my own pocket.” In 1928, four years after the closure, Fell was reported as declaring, "I tried hard enough to succeed, and if anyone thinks they can do so they are welcome to try", and that, "Newnes is as dead as Julius Caesar".

==== Sale of assets at Newnes and failed revival ====
After his own disappointments of the early 1920s, Fell was associated with a later attempt to revive Newnes. In July 1930, he sold Commonwealth Oil Corporation's assets at Newnes, the refinery and the railway, to the companies in the consortium of the Broken Hill Associated Smelters. The new owners set up a company, Shale Oil Investigations Proprietary Limited, and expended around £6,000. This attempted revival came to nothing, after a decision of the new owners to abandon the project, in January 1931.

Unemployed miners rushed to Newnes in search of work, in February 1931, at the height of the Great Depression, but the 'reopening' was brief, with a relatively small amount of oil—around 200,000 gallons—made in 1931 and early 1932, by the government-backed Shale Oil Development Committee.

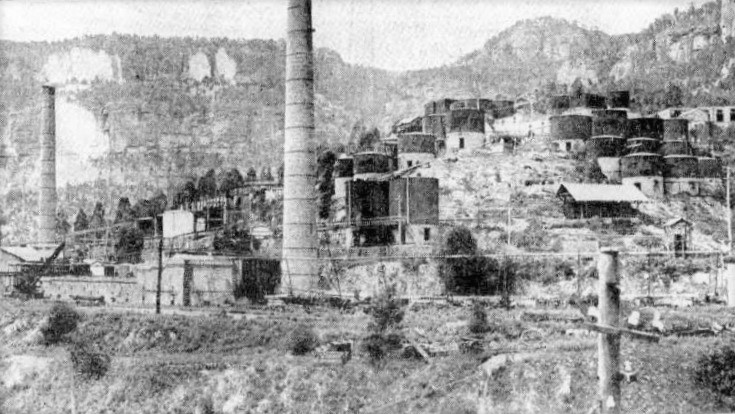
Industrial remnants at Newnes, c.1931

Once it became apparent that the shale oil works would not remain operating, the railway to Newnes officially closed on 1 January 1932. Talk of reopening Newnes continued, throughout the 1930s, through the work of the government-backed Shale Oil Development Committee and Newnes Investigation Committee, as well as various private companies, but crude oil production at Newnes never resumed.

By the mid 1930s, the Wolgan Valley was almost depopulated and what remained of its huge industrial complex, and most of its mining township, was subsiding into ruins.

=== Sydney ===
==== Refineries in Sydney ====
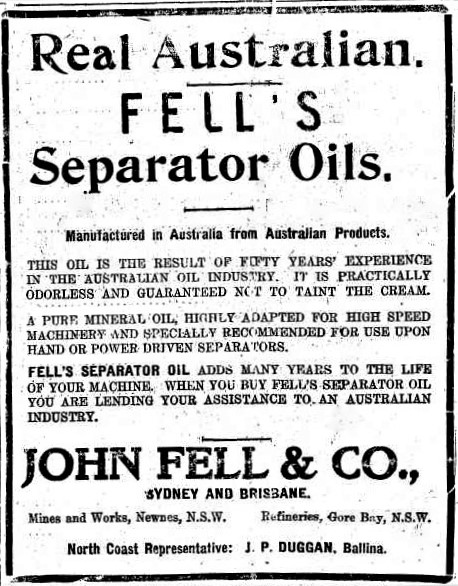
Advertisement for John Fell & Co.'s oil for separators (1923)

John Fell and Company operated refineries on Gore Bay at Greenwich and at Clyde on the Parramatta River, both in Sydney.

===== Gore Bay (Greenwich) refinery =====
The refinery was located, on the foreshore of Gore Bay, just south of Shell's bulk unloading and storage facility. It appears that the site was acquired from the Greenwich Timber Company in 1911. Before it was a timber yard, the site had been a bitumen refinery, operated by the Patent Asphaltum Company of New South Wales, from 1884 to 1908, which processed crude bitumen from Trinidad.

Fell relocated storage tanks from the old Hartley Vale railway station, to install at the refinery in 1914.

The Gore Bay refinery was used for the production of lubricants. In 1921, the company acquired land adjacent to the refinery and erected a four-storey brick reinforced concrete building, with brick curtain walls, for use as a bulk store for its products. In 1923, with Fell's operations shifting from shale oil to imported crude oil, he planned to also use the Gore Bay site as a tanker berth and to store imported crude oil. Despite local opposition he succeeded in erecting storage tanks there.

===== Clyde refinery =====
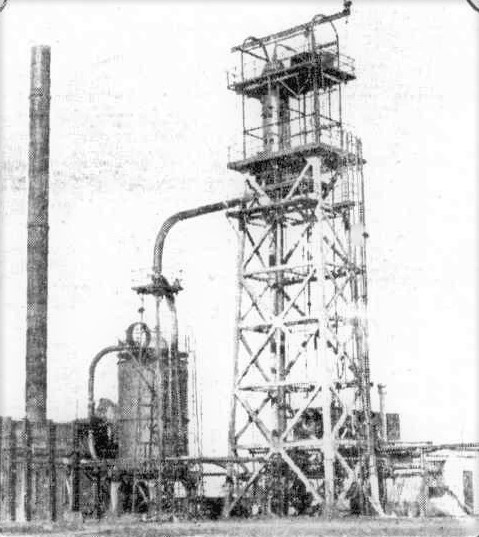
Dubb's Cracking Plant, Clyde Refinery, 1926.

John Fell and Company constructed a refinery at Clyde (sometimes referred to as being at Granville) that commenced operation in 1925. The land had been purchased in 1923, probably once it became clear to Fell that Newnes and its refinery would be shut down permanently. The site had access to the rail network and a river frontage, to where crude oil unloaded from tankers in Sydney Harbour, at Gore Bay, could be brought by barge, and plenty of land for subsequent expansion.

The new refinery reused bricks and other items recovered from the old Commonwealth Oil Corporation plants at Newnes and Torbane.

The plant included a 'Dubb's cracker' for the production of 'knockless' fuel for motor vehicles. The first unit entered full production in 1926, and a second one was planned. The products were distributed, under the names 'DUX' motor spirit (for cars) and 'Ajax' power kerosene (for tractors). The cracker allowed more fuel to be obtained from the same amount of crude oil.

==== Offices ====
From 1902, the offices of John Fell & Company were in a building at 117–119 George Street, Sydney, which is now heritage listed and occupied by the Julian Ashton Art School. Fell purchased the building from the N.S.W. Government, in 1931, and it then became his personal property.

=== John Fell & Company Limited ===
The company John Fell & Company had been set up in 1902. Needing to raise funds for the expansion of operations at Clyde and for working capital, the company went to the market in May 1926, to raise more capital in the form of preference shares. The shares of John Fell & Company Limited were listed on the Sydney Stock Exchange, on 24 October 1926. Fell was Chairman and Managing Director, and Fell's surviving brother, Walter John Fell (d. 1938), was General Manager.

=== Death of eldest son, sale of assets, and voluntary liquidation ===
On 19 August 1927, Fell’s eldest son, John Simpson Fell (1894–1927), died as a result of an explosion at the Clyde Refinery on the previous day. Two other men also died. This occurred only days after the assets at Newnes had been put up for sale.

In December 1927, it was announced that the Clyde refinery was also to be sold. John Fell and Company “would manufacture motor spirit and fuel oil for another organisation, on a profit-sharing basis,” and that a “provision in the agreement requires the vendor company to carry on for a period on behalf of and at the expense of the purchaser until it is convenient to put the company into liquidation.” At the time it was stated that the name John Fell would continue to be used in the name of a private company, owned by the new owner of the assets.

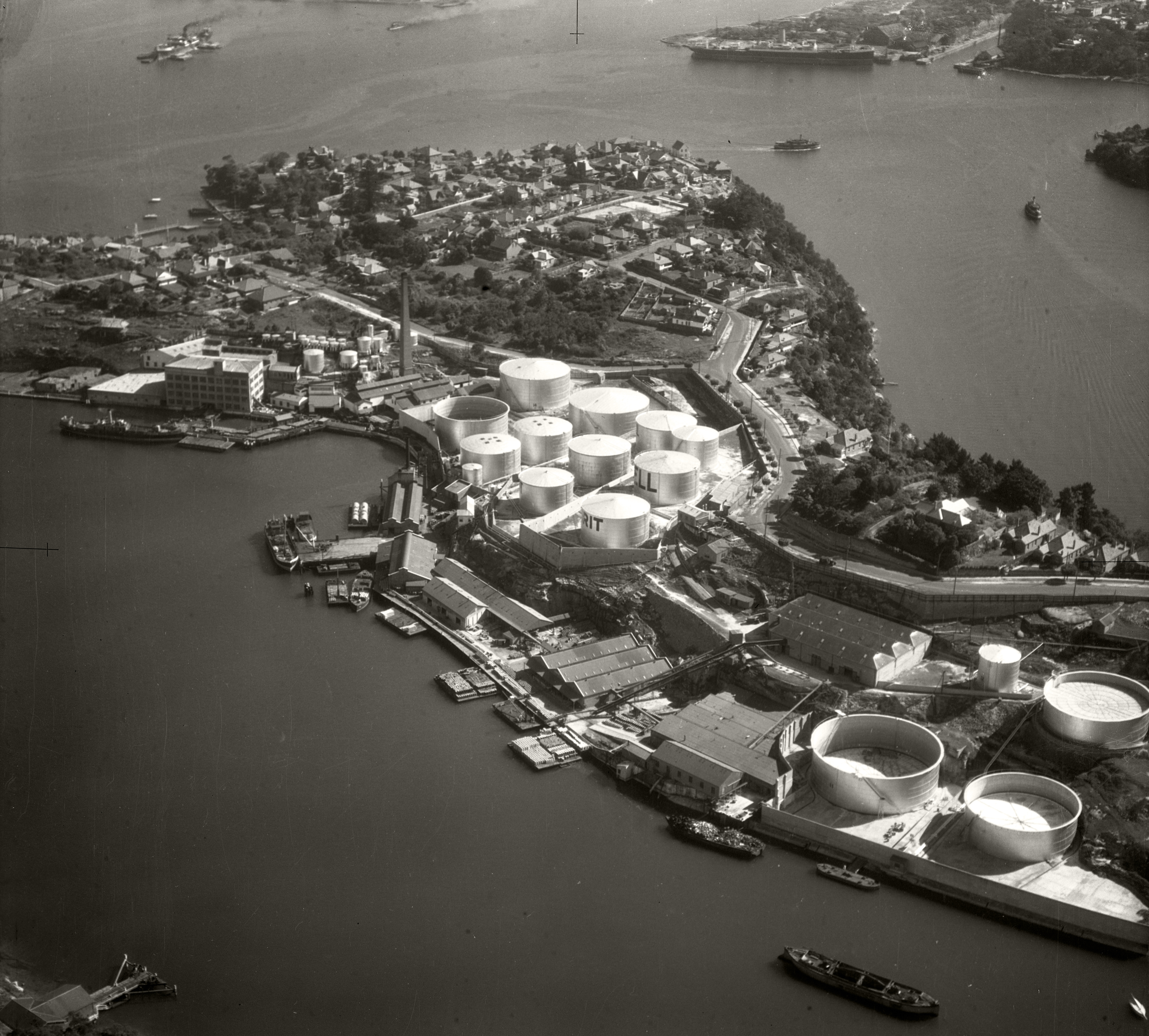
Shell, Gore Bay. in Sept. 1935, with the old John Fell & Co. oil refinery, still intact and operating, at the upper left.

The reasons given for the sale were high labour costs and keen competition. John Fell & Company Limited had made a loss of £16,375 in year to 30 June 1927, and had paid no dividend since June 1926. Payments to preference shareholders resulted in the holders of ordinary shares receiving less than the face value of their shares, from the proceeds of the asset sale.

It seems that Fell had concluded that his company did not have the necessary capital—only £300,000—to compete against larger international oil companies, but quite possibly the recent work-related death of his son and his own advancing age—by then he was 65—were also factors in the decision to sell the assets.

The new owner was, the British Imperial Oil Company, owned by Royal Dutch Shell, better known by its brand name ‘Shell’. Shell operated the oil fields in Borneo, which had proven to be so competitive with the Newnes crude oil. As part of the sale, Shell also acquired the Gore Bay refinery and storage site; Shell already owned the adjoining site at Gore Bay. The Gore Bay lubricant oil refinery and blending plant continued operating, under Shell ownership.

John Fell & Company Limited was voluntarily liquidated on 17 June 1930.

== Family, homes, later life and death ==
Fell married Margaret Clark Simpson (1866-1945), in 1888.

The couple had five children. Their eldest child was Janet M Fell (1892–1988); it seems that she married and went to live in America. Their eldest son was John Simpson Fell (1894–1927), an engineer, who served in the First World War, and who died as a result of an explosion at Clyde refinery. Their second daughter was Helen Marion Fell (1897–1977), who was well known as the socialite, Marion Fell; she never married but continued the family involvement in the Kindergarten movement began by her relative, philanthropist, Helen Wilson Fell (1849–1935). Their second son was Douglas Alexander Fell (1901–1962). After receiving a Bachelor of Petroleum Engineering at the University of Colorado, he began his career with John Fell & Co. at Clyde, and then became an executive with Shell, working in Borneo and the U.S.A. as well as Australia; he became Shell's N.S.W. Manager in 1942. In retirement, Douglas was a grazier at Campbelltown. Their youngest son was Ian Buchan Fell (1904–1962), who was a Squadron Leader and is now best known for the Ian Buchan Fell Housing Research Centre, in the Faculty of Architecture at the University of Sydney, which was endowed by his bequest.

During the time that the family lived in the Shoalhaven, their residence at Nowra was known as 'Rosstrevor'. They gave a very similar name, 'Rostrevor', to another house, with a notable garden, where the family lived for many years, from around 1906, at 16 Point Road, in the harbour-side Sydney suburb of Northwood. It is probable that the house was named after Rostrevor in Ireland.

Fell was to live a long life, after his retirement in 1928. He was a guest at the official opening of a Shell bitumen refinery at Clyde, in 1948. Although he was not involved in National Oil Proprietary Limited, he did advise Sir George Davis on retort design issues for the shale oil extraction facility at Glen Davis. He defended the design of his 'Fell retorts' in a letter written in 1951, by then in his 89th year. Fell was still alive, when the last Australian shale oil was made, and the Glen Davis operation closed, in May 1952.

He was living at Pymble, by January 1951, and it was still his address when he died on 11 June 1955.

== Legacy ==
Fell was an important figure in the Australian oil industry, in the first three decades of the 20th century. His name is often connected with the industrial ruins at Newnes and, of those associated with the place, Fell was by far the most successful.

Three generations of his family were involved in the oil industry, spanning from his father's pioneering role in the Scottish shale oil industry of the 1860s, including Fell's own involvement, and on to his sons' involvement in the refining of conventional oil in Australia. The State Library of New South Wales collection includes the papers of the Fell family covering a period from around 1837 to 1975, including news cuttings, relating to shale oil industry.

The former Shell facilities at Greenwich and Clyde—both now owned by Viva Energy—are Fell's main legacies, although neither refine oil now.

His wife, Margaret, was significant in making the jacaranda popular in Australia. Many of the trees in the avenue of jacarandas, at Grafton, were grown from seed of the trees she grew in the garden of the Fells' home, 'Rostrevor', at Northwood, part of which still survives. It was also at 'Rostrevor', where Margaret hosted the first of the meetings that brought about a branch of the Red Cross in New South Wales, in 1911.
