= New South Wales Shale and Oil Company =

Australian company

The New South Wales Shale and Oil Company — established in 1872, by the merging of two earlier ventures — mined and processed oil shale to produce kerosene, paraffin wax and candles, and other petroleum products, in New South Wales Australia. It is particularly associated with the sites of its former works, at Hartley Vale and Torbane. Its assets were bought by Commonwealth Oil Corporation in 1906.

== Origins ==
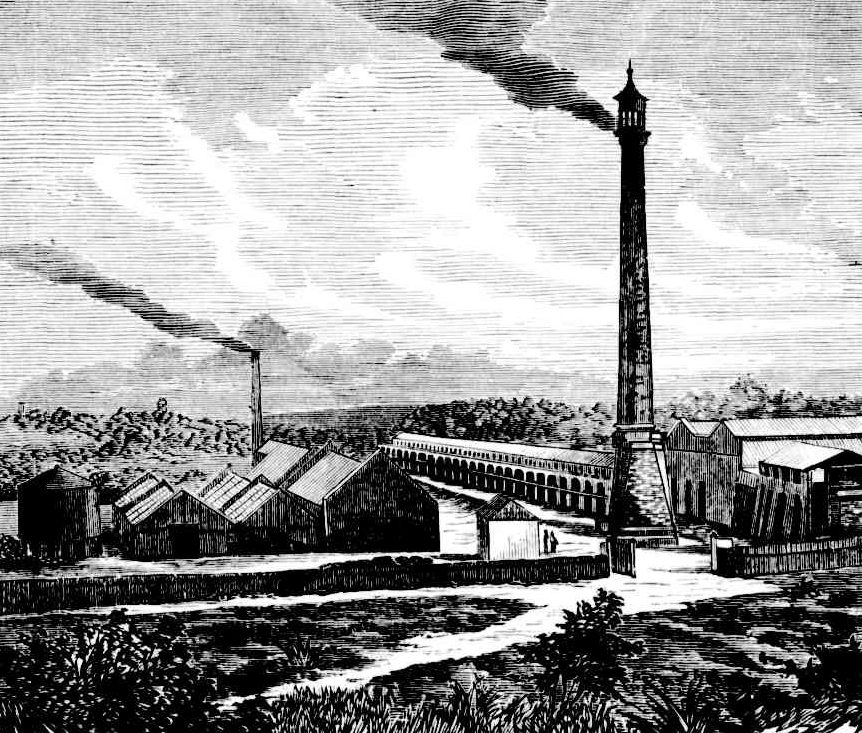
'Comet' kerosene works at Waterloo in 1878.

The company was formed by the merger of two earlier companies, the Hartley Kerosene Oil and Paraffine Company and the Western Kerosene Oil Company. Both these companies had operations at Hartley Vale, both mining the same shale seam, and the Western Kerosene Oil Company also had a retorting and refining works, at Waterloo, in Sydney.

The first operations at Harley Vale had been those of the Hartley Kerosene Oil and Paraffine Company. In 1865, it established a shale mine with adjacent retorts in an area of the valley that it called 'Petrolea Vale'. The 'Petrolea Vale' retorts closed in 1870. In 1868, a second separate company began operations at Harley Vale, the Western Kerosene Oil Company, which mined shale but did not have retorts there. Instead, it shipped the oil shale to its retorts and refinery at Waterloo. The shale had to be carried up a metre gauge inclined tramway, loaded onto trains at Mount Victoria and railed to Redfern, where it was off loaded and carried by road to the retorts and refinery. This arrangement was considerably more costly than if the retorts were at the mine and only crude oil or finished products needed to be dispatched by rail. Only higher-grade shale could be processed economically, leaving much of the shale seam as waste.

The Sydney merchant Thomas Sutcliffe Mort and the manager of Western Kerosene Oil Company, Scottish-born gas engineer and shale oil expert James Walter Fell (1847–1882), were pivotal in the merger of the two companies and rationalisation of their operations, to form New South Wales Shale and Oil, in 1872. Mort was a director of Western Kerosene Company when, in July 1871, he had bought the assets of its unsuccessful rival at an auction. The new company was incorporated by an act of the New South Wales Parliament on 10 February 1873, and took over all existing operations at Hartley Vale and Waterloo.

== History of operation, technology, and products ==
The company produced kerosene with the brand name 'Comet' and oil shale for use in town gas enrichment, as well as lubricating oils and paraffin wax candles.

Initially, the new company only mined shale at Hartley Vale and concentrated all processing and manufacturing operations at Waterloo. Only the highest-grade shale was sent for processing; shale that assayed as high as 60 gallons of oil per ton was not even mined. However, around 1874, a seam of coal was discovered at Hartley Vale, about 40 feet below the shale seams, providing a source of fuel to support retorts and a refinery. And, in 1876, at a location where the Main Western railway line was at its closest to Hartley Vale, a station and exchange siding of that name was opened. These developments, together with the prospect of also processing lower grades of shale, were favourable for a migration of retorting operations to the mining site at Hartley Vale.

There were ten retorts in operation at Hartley Vale, by June 1880, and by May 1883 there were 69, with more being built. The company closed its retorts at Waterloo and, by early 1886, had relocated its kerosene refining operations to Hartley Vale, leasing these to A. M. Fell & Sons, an oil and grease manufacturer. The sophisticated new refining plant had been designed by Alexander Morrison Fell (1825–1890) — a leading figure in the early period of the Scottish shale oil industry, who after he had migrated to Australia, had been a works manager at Mount Kembla and Joadja — and it was manufactured entirely in Sydney, by Mort's Dock & Engineering, G & C Hoskins, and other local companies. From December 1886, the retorts at Hartley Vale were also operated by A. M. Fell & Sons; the same company also ran the remaining refining operations at Waterloo, which by that time probably only consisted of production of lubricants from the heavier oils. The N.S.W. Shale and Oil Company, for its part, were required to supply oil shale and to purchase, at an agreed rate, the kerosene and gasoline produced by the refinery, with A. M. Fell & Sons retaining the heavier oils and other products of the refining process.

The commercial arrangement with A. M. Fell & Sons culminated in a court case in 1889. Under the terms of the settlement, the company paid A. M. Fell & Sons £4000 and their legal costs, and bought the stocks of products on hand at the time, but the commercial arrangements were ended. Thereafter, N.S.W. Shale and Oil Company was again running its own retorts and refining operations. In 1896, the company introduced new vertical retorts, to a design patented by its then general manager, William Hall, that enabled the company to process its accumulated stockpiles of low-grade oil shale profitably.

In 1896, the company bought the 'King Mine', at Torbane, which it renamed the New Hartley Mine, and mined shale there. Forty vertical retorts and other structures were erected there, in 1900, by which time William Hall was the chairman of directors. Crude oil produced in the retorts was sold to the Australian Gas Light Co, for gas enrichment, under a ten year contract to supply 1,000,000 imperial gallons per annum, but was also railed to the company's existing shale oil refinery at Hartley Vale, for further processing by fractional distillation. The retorts required coal as fuel, and this was obtained from the Wongawilli coal seam, which outcropped at Mount Airly.

In the 1888s and 1890s, the company had premises adjacent to the Darling Harbour railway line at Ultimo, where they manufactured grease and lubricating oil.

In 1902, the duty on imported kerosene was removed.

== Demise and aftermath ==
On 31 March 1906, the N.S.W. Shale and Oil Company and its assets were purchased by the newly-incorporated Commonwealth Oil Corporation, as a going concern. After the completion of this transaction, the New South Wales Shale and Oil Company was voluntarily wound up, in 1907. The operations of the company continued, under its new ownership, for a few years, but were eventually affected by the exhaustion of the shale deposit at Hartley Vale, in 1910, and the financial impact of the failure of the new owner's shale oil operation at Newnes, in 1912-1913. The operation at Torbane was revived briefly, from 1916 to 1918, by John Fell.

== See also ==
- Commonwealth Oil Corporation
- Australian Kerosene Oil Company
- List of shale oil operations in Australia
